= Portugal in the Reconquista =

Historical period

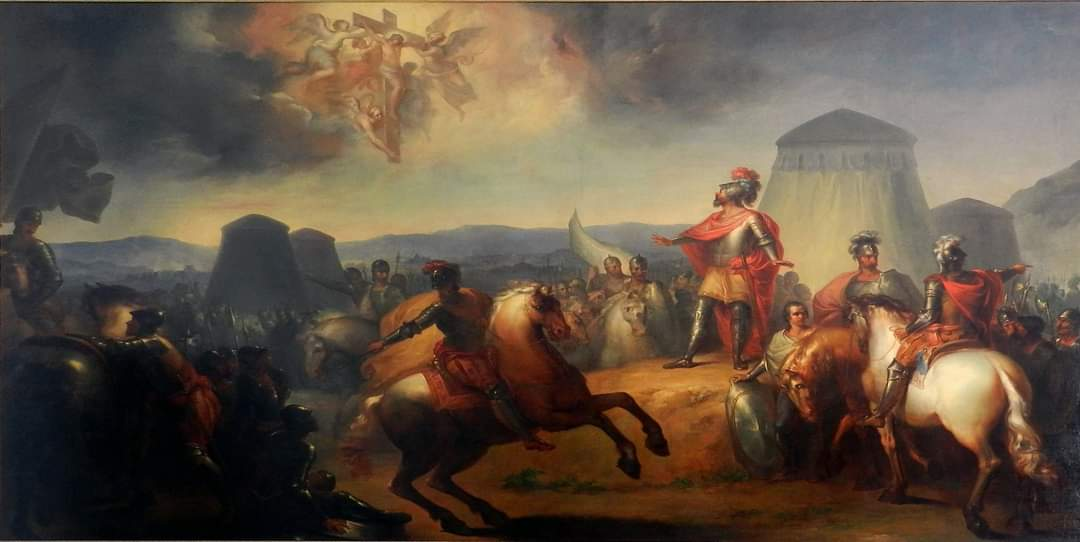
18th century painting of the Battle of Ourique.

Portuguese participation in the Reconquista occurred from when the County of Portugal was founded in 868 and continued for 381 years until the last cities still in Muslim control in the Algarve were captured in 1249. Portugal was created during this prolonged process and largely owes its geographic form to it.

The initial stages of the Portuguese Reconquista were marked by the participation of the upper aristocracy, but as the frontier was steadily pushed further south initiative was yielded to minor nobles, town militiamen and peasant knights willing to go on lengthy campaigns. The final stages of Portuguese military effort in the south were mostly undertaken by the military Orders, most notably the Knights of Santiago and the Templars, but also the Order of Calatrava and Hospitallers to a lesser degree. The threat of Muslim raids also prompted the creation of the Portuguese Navy, the oldest in the world still in operation. The Portuguese Reconquista involved the participation of north European crusaders passing through Portuguese coasts en route to the Holy Land, such as Englishmen, French, Flemings, Normans, Danes and Germans, most notably at the conquest of Lisbon in 1147, but also in 1142, 1154, 1189, 1191 and 1217. Many settled in Portugal at the invitation of king Afonso I or his son and successor Sancho I.

While the Count of Portugal was a major vassal of León, at the time of independence, the economy of Portugal was relatively underdeveloped, and there was no mint in the country. The capture of spoils or extraction of tribute provided momentary income but it was largely unreliable. Defensive needs motivated the settlement and economic development of the territory and this in turn provided the means for further expansion. Religious Orders such as the Cistercians led the way in agricultural development through a system of granges worked by lay brothers who enabled them to maintain agricultural and cattle enterprises of a sophistication and scale previously unheard of in Portugal. The military Orders later adopted similar economies of scale and introduced notably sophisticated methods of production, irrigation and fortification. As Islam receded, Portuguese cities became steadily more prosperous and larger, with signs of an international Portuguese maritime trade appearing by the thirteenth century.

The expansion of Portugal was vital to the legitimization of Afonso I as an independent sovereign, with the Papal decree Manifestis Probatum acknowledging Afonso's efforts in the reconquest of territory back to Christendom as "manifestly proven" and his claims to the title of king as worthy of recognition.

== Background ==
In 711, a Muslim army commanded by Tariq ibn Ziyad, belonging to the Umayyad Caliphate of Damascus, invaded the Iberian peninsula then controlled in its entirety by the Visigothic Kingdom. The Visigoths and their king, Roderic, were defeated at the Battle of Guadalete and from that moment on the peninsula was quickly captured by Muslim forces, which included Arabs and Berbers, in about two years thereafter.

Eleven years later Pelagius revolted against the Muslim occupation in Asturias and in 722 defeated a Muslim force at the Battle of Covadonga, expelled the Muslim governor Munuza from the region and founded the Kingdom of Asturias.

This kingdom gradually expanded across the mountainous north of the Iberian peninsula, capturing Leon and Galicia among other territories and it would be under the aegis of its kings that 146 years later Christian rule would reach the banks of the Douro River, where the city and region of Portucale, now Porto, was located.

Important events took place in al-Andalus before the founding of the county of Portugal. Around the emir of Cordoba grew an expensive bureaucratic apparel manned by slaves, freemen and berbers as well as an army of mercenary slave or Berber troops, which drew the hostility of both the Arab aristocracy as well as recent converts to Islam. Converts in particular complained of excessive taxation as if they were still Christian. A revolt sparked in Toledo but it was violently suppressed in 854. Another revolt against the central government took place in Mérida in 868 led by the muladi Ibn Marwan and although Mérida was recaptured and almost razed, the revolt moved to Badajoz. For half a century, the west of Iberia corresponding to the old Roman province of Lusitania elluded Cordoban control. Instability in al-Andalus would provide the Christian kingdoms with an opportunity to advance at its expense.

== Establishment of the counties of Portugal and Coimbra, 868-977 ==
Alfonso III succeeded on the throne in 866. He envisioned the restoration of the Gothic monarchy in Iberia and hoped to achieve it in his lifetime, but this depended on securing several great frontier strongholds. He has been considered "the greatest ruler of the Asturian monarchy".

=== Founding of the County of Portugal 868 ===
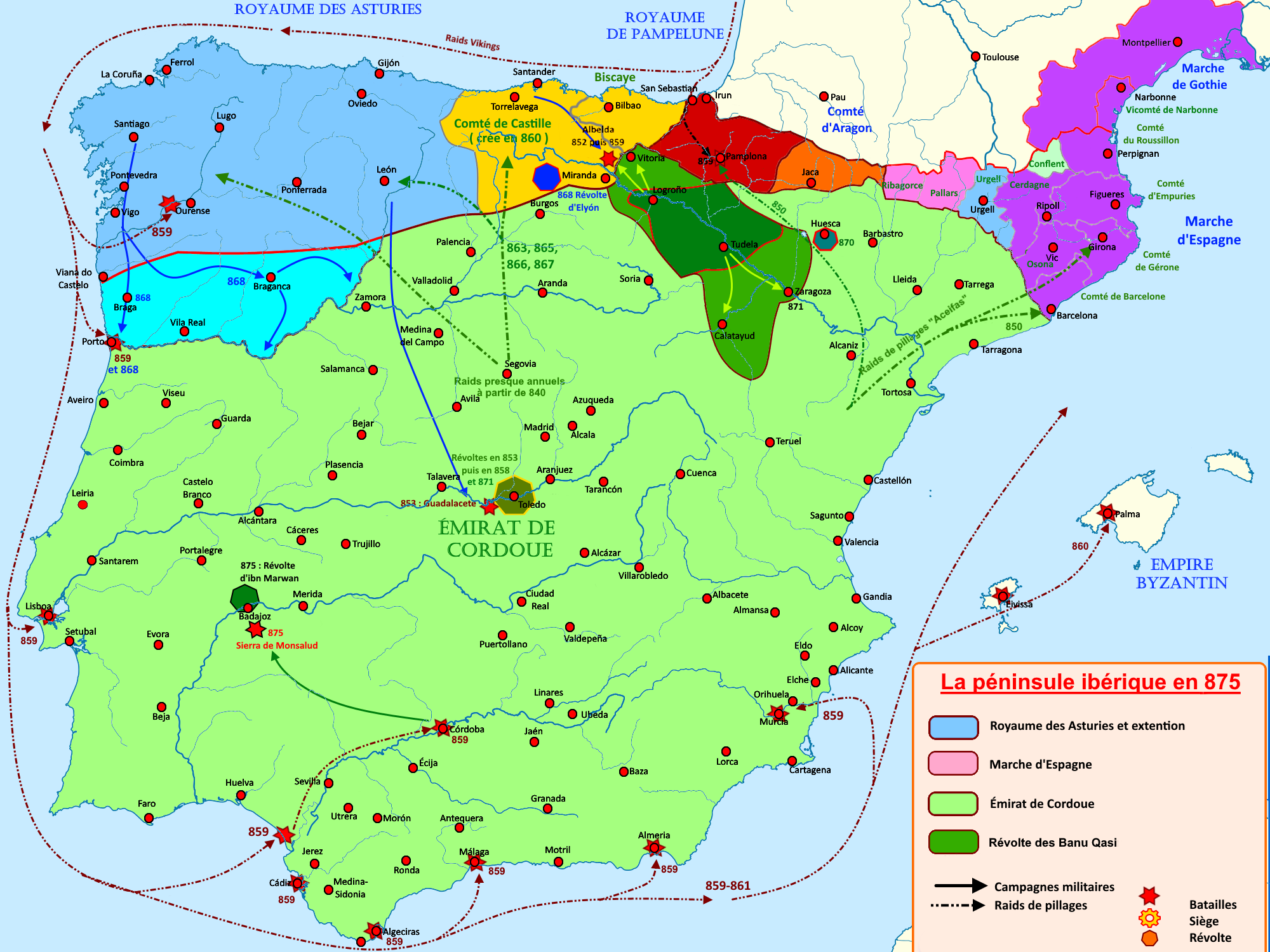
The Iberian peninsula in 875.

157 years after the invasion of the Iberian peninsula by Muslims, the nobleman Vímara Peres seized Porto and its territory, then called Portucale, or Portugal, at a time when the head of royal guard of the Emir of Cordoba had revolted. Acting on orders of Alfonso III, Vímara Peres was granted broad privileges and the territory began to be settled by families belonging to the high nobility, few in number and related to royalty.

The capture and occupation of territory continued and in 870 Braga was settled and its territory was organized under the personal guidance of Vímara Peres. In the same year, São Miguel do Paraíso was taken over by Lucídio Vimaranes, son of Vimara Peres. Still in 870, São Tomé de Negrelos was occupied by Flomarico and his wife Gundila, as well as by Scelemondo with his wife Astragundia.

Count Odoário seized Chaves in 872, and from this city the process of capture and resettlement of the mountainous Trás-os-Montes began, first in and around the fertile lands of the Chaves valley.

From the fortress of Montemor to the mouth of the Vouga, 70 miles. This is where the land of Portugal begins, as it is said. Portugal is a flourishing country, covered with housing, castles, villages and many tilled fields. Many man-at-arms are to be found there, both on foot and on horse, who raid their neighbours who do not belong to their party.

— Al-Idrisi

Count Vímara Peres died the following year and he was succeeded in office by his son, Lucídio Vimaranes.

=== Founding of the County of Coimbra 878 ===
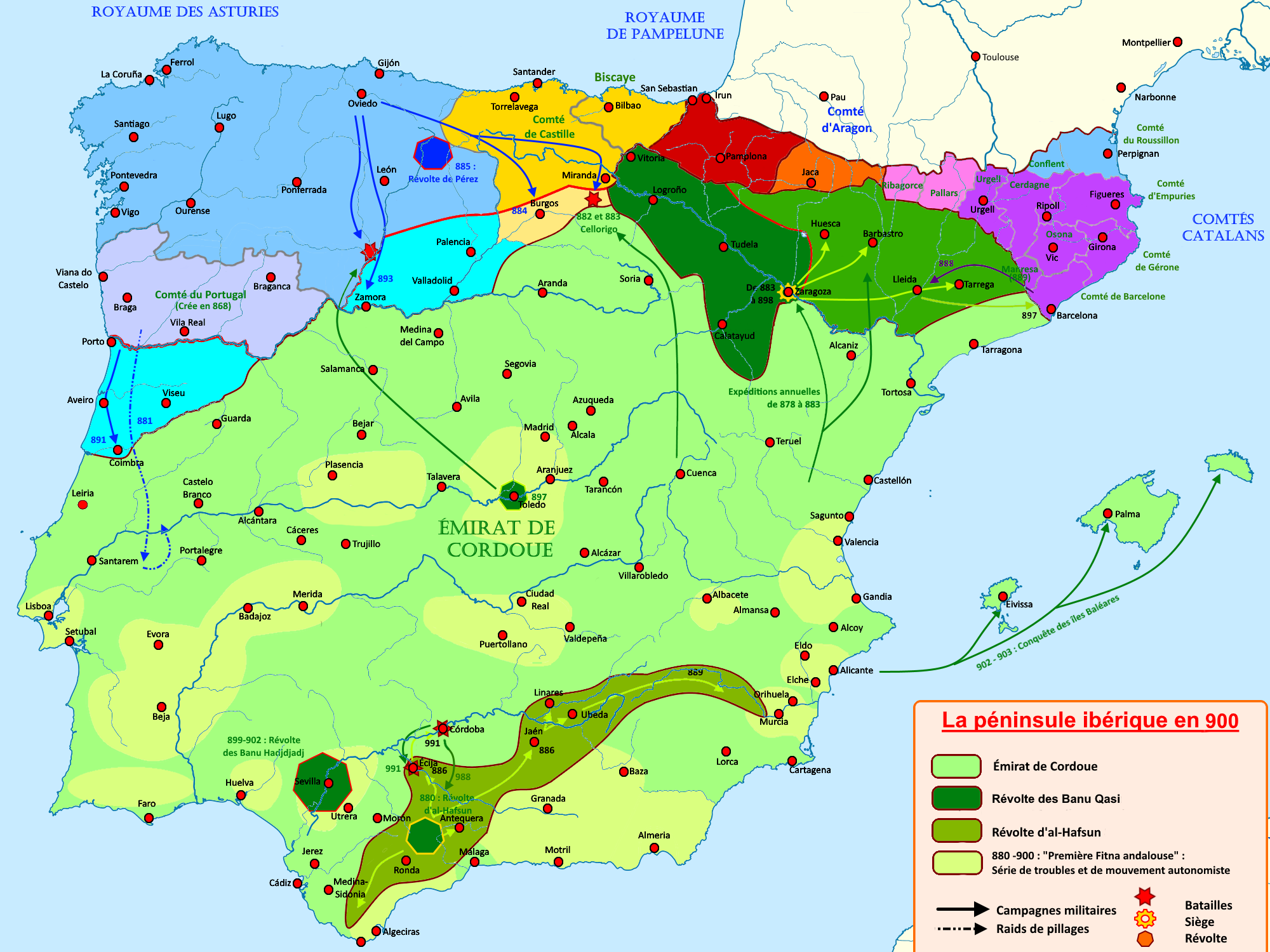
The Iberian peninsula in 900.

The city of Coimbra was seized by Count Hermenegildo Guterres in 878. Other locations south of the Douro were then taken and resettled by order of Alfonso III of Asturias, such as Viseu, Lamego, and Anégia. Lardosa was seized in 882 by Muzara and Zamora, two Mozarabs most likely coming from the south.

This is a small but well-populated and flourishing city, whose surroundings are covered with vineyards and orchards of apple, cherry and plum trees. The city is built on a hilltop that is easy to defend and difficult to access, not far from the river called Mondego, which flows east of the city and powers its mills. From Coimbra to Santarém, in the south, it takes three days to travel. From Coimbra to the sea, to the west, it is 12 miles. And that is where the mouth of the Mondego is located, a river next to which there is a very strong castle called Montemor. The fields of Coimbra are very fertile.

— Al-Idrisi

The Christian border progressed nearly 200 km south along the coast, passing from the Douro River to the Mondego valley but inland the border ran northeast along the Estrela mountain range on the northern slope but probably did not exceed the Côa River to the east.

=== Campaigns in the west, 878-977 ===
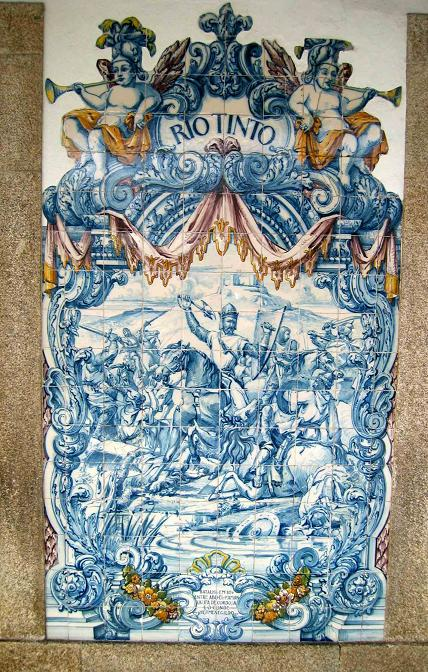
Portuguese azulejos tile panel depicting the battle and legend of Rio Tinto.

King Alfonso III died in 910 and his kingdom was divided between his three sons. León fell to his eldest son Garcia, followed by second oldest Ordonho II, who inherited Galicia with the counties of Portugal and Coimbra, while his third oldest Fruela II received Asturias.

Count Hermenegildo Guterres of Coimbra died in 912 and he was succeeded by his son Aires Mendes.

King Ordonho II carried out a major raid into al-Andalus in August 913 and he managed to sack the poorly fortified city of Évora, from where he returned laden with spoils. Since Ordonho knew Caliph Abd al-Rahman III to be busy elsewhere in al-Andalus, he expected little retaliation. The Cordobans led an attack on León the following year however, but it was repulsed. King Garcia of León died in 914 with no heirs to succeed him and Ordonho II inherited the throne of León.

Count Lucidio Vimaranes died in 924 and he was succeeded not by his son, but by Hermenegildo Gonçalves, a galician noble espoused to Mumadona Dias.

Ordonho II died in 924 and his kingdoms were inherited by Fruela of Asturias, who thus reunited his fathers divided kingdom. Yet Fruela ruled only for fourteen months and he died in 924. The three sons of Alfonso III must have struck an agreement between themselves as to who succeed in each of their kingdoms when they passed, as both Ordonho II and Fruela II left behind three sons each who all vied for control and a succession dispute ensued.

Count Gonçalo Mendes succeeded on the county of Portugal in 950. Ordonho III succeeded on the throne of León the following year. Ordonho III withstood Muslim attacks nearly every year. In 955, he led another major raid into al-Andalus that reached as far as Lisbon, which was sacked, and he subsequently signed a truce with Caliph Abd al-Rahman III in 956. In Portugal, Mumadona Dias ordered the castle of Guimarães to be built to protect the local inhabitants and the monks of a nearby monastery from Muslim or Viking attacks, and by 968 the castle was finished.

== Cordoban campaigns 977–1008 ==
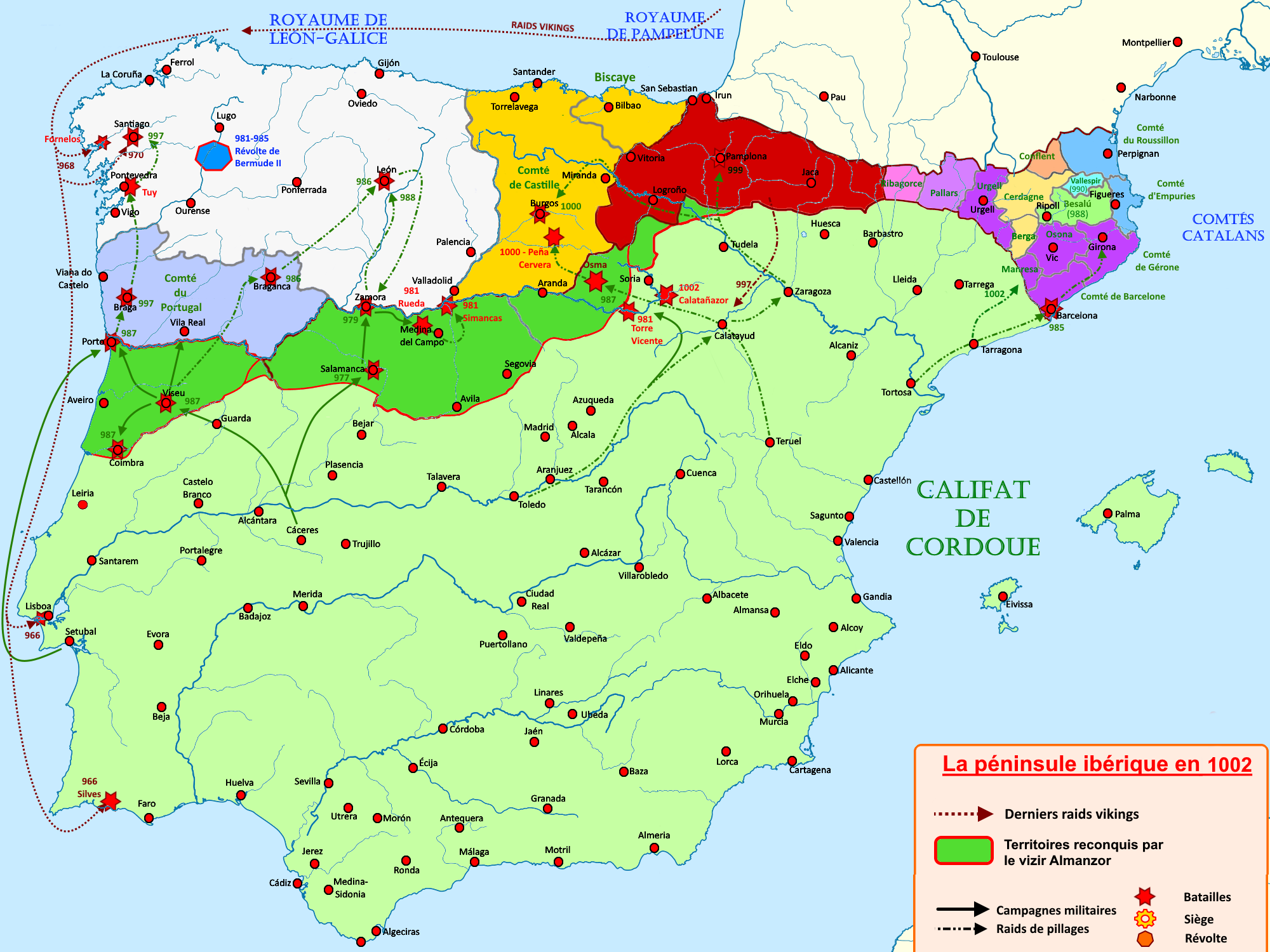
The Iberian peninsula in 1002

On October 1, 976, Hisham II succeeded Al-Hakam II on the throne of Cordoba. The following week, he appointed Ibn Abi Amir, later known as Almanzor, to the position of hajib or prime minister. Almanzor continued the military reforms previously begun by Al-Hakam II and he instituted a policy of destructive campaigns against the Christian kingdoms of the north the following year, usually twice a year, to collect tribute or sack them if they refused to pay. This policy would continue beyond his death until 1008. These were 31 years of Cordoban hegemony imposed on the Christian kingdoms with brutality and the most chaotic since the beginning of the Reconquista.

Almanzor's 15th campaign in 981 was the first to be directed at modern-day Portuguese territory. It targeted Trancoso and Viseu. Both towns were sacked and their populations carried off to slavery. In 986, Conímbriga was sacked, as were the suburbs of Coimbra. The count of Coimbra at that time was Froila Gonçalves.

In 987, Almanzor attacked Coimbra once more, but he returned at the head of his troops that same year and occupied the city on June 27, as well as Seia, Viseu, and Lamego. Froila Gonçalves chose to collaborate with Almanzor and switched sides, thus preserving his property and vassals. In 990, the Cordobans captured Montemor-o-Velho. The border thus shifted back to the Douro Valley, although the castle of Montemor-o-Velho would return to Christian possession, only to fall into Muslim hands again.

The strong castle of Aguiar do Sousa was sacked in 995 despite its exceptional defensive qualities, and the Muslims captured thousands of people during this campaign.

Porto in the Middle Ages.

In 997, Almanzor set out on his most famous raid, the Santiago de Compostela campaign. The cavalry left Córdoba on 3 July accompanied by supply wagons, along the old Roman road that headed northwest, while the infantry, weapons, provisions and ammunition headed for the port city of Alcácer do Sal, where they would embark to the rendezvous point at the city of Porto, in Portuguese territory. At Coria, several counts from León joined Almanzor's army. From there, Almanzor reached Viseu, where he was joined by subjugated counts and Christian nobles exiled from their countries, such as Galindo the Galician or Froila Gonçalves, former count of Coimbra, who had preferred to side with Almanzor when he captured the city in 987.

Once the army and navy had gathered by the Douro River, the troops crossed it via a pontoon bridge that Almanzor had built, the first to connect its two banks. Porto was poorly fortified and offered little resistance. The campaign towards Galicia was preceded by an incursion by troops led by a brother of Froila Gonçalves, Veila Gonçalves, who lived in Terra de Santa Maria under Muslim rule and was charged with neutralising any forces that could jeopardise the advance of the Muslim army, namely those of Count Gonçalo Mendes of Portugal. Henrique Gonçalves, lord of Maia, whose castle was the main fortification in the region, colluded with Veila. Brittonia, near Viana do Castelo, put up strong resistance but was sacked. At Valadares de Monção, they crossed the Minho river. The Cordoban army reached as far as Compostela, and on their way back from Santiago, the spoils were divided at Lamego among the leaders who had taken part in the campaign, both Christian and Muslim.

Count Gonçalo Mendes died on the same year as the great Cordoban attack on Santiago de Compostela, and was succeeded by his son Mendo Gonçalves. The King of León Bermudo II died in 999 and he was succeeded on the throne by his five-year-old son, Alfonso V. The great cordoban campaigns against the north shattered the idea of a neo-Gothic revival in Iberia and by 1000 the Astur-Leonese monarchy was on the brink of collapse.

The territory recovered by Cordoba as a result of the campaigns of Almanzor.

Almanzor died on August 8, 1002, and was succeeded by his son Abd al-Malik Al-Muzzafar. Threatened by Cordoban troops sent to reinforce Coimbra, count Mendo Gonçalves of Portugal realized that Muslim power remained intact despite the passing of Almansur, therefore he chose to negotiate the maintenance of a previous truce. Almuzzafar displayed diligence as a military commander, though he was a less enthusiastic administration than Almanzor had been, and died in 1008. Count Mendo Gonçalves also died that year during a Viking raid against Portugal. His widow Toda Mendo assumed the regency and married their daughter and heir to Alvito Nunes.

== First advance to the Tagus, 1009-1093 ==
Civil war broke out in the Caliphate of Cordoba in 1009 and this would ultimately result in the fragmentation of the Andaluz into several independent and rival emirates or taifa states, a circumstance which benefited the Christian kingdoms of the north.

Though ascribed to an earlier date in traditional historiography, the episode known as "the armada of the Gascons" is likely to have taken place about this time. Now that Cordoba had fallen to infighting once more and ceased their predatory campaigns, the Christian peoples sought to reconstruct their lands now left largely in disarray. A considerable number of Muslims had settled throughout Portugal and as the region had been devastated by war, the local noblemen lacked the necessary men-at-arms to expel them. Moninho Viegas was dispatched to Gascony on a mission to recruit volunteers to resettle Porto and recapture the region, and he is likely to have returned by sea in 1009, while the following year a battle was struck at Vila Boa do Bispo. In fulfillment of a vow, Viegas built a monastery at that location, which was entrusted to the French abbot Rosardo upon its completion in 1012. Among the participants of these campaigns was a prelate from Vendôme, Nonegus, and Our Lady of Vendôme was adopted as patron of the city.

In 1028 Alfonso V of León besieged Viseu, however he was killed in the action by a crossbow bolt shot from the walls.

On October 14, 1034, Gonçalo Trastamires da Maia reconquered Montemor-o-Velho, thus bringing the border to the Mondego river.

The emir of Seville, Abu al-Qasim Muhammad ibn Abbad, invaded Christian territory in 1035, but was defeated by King Bermudo III at the Battle of Cesar.

=== The conquest of Beiras, 1055–1064 ===
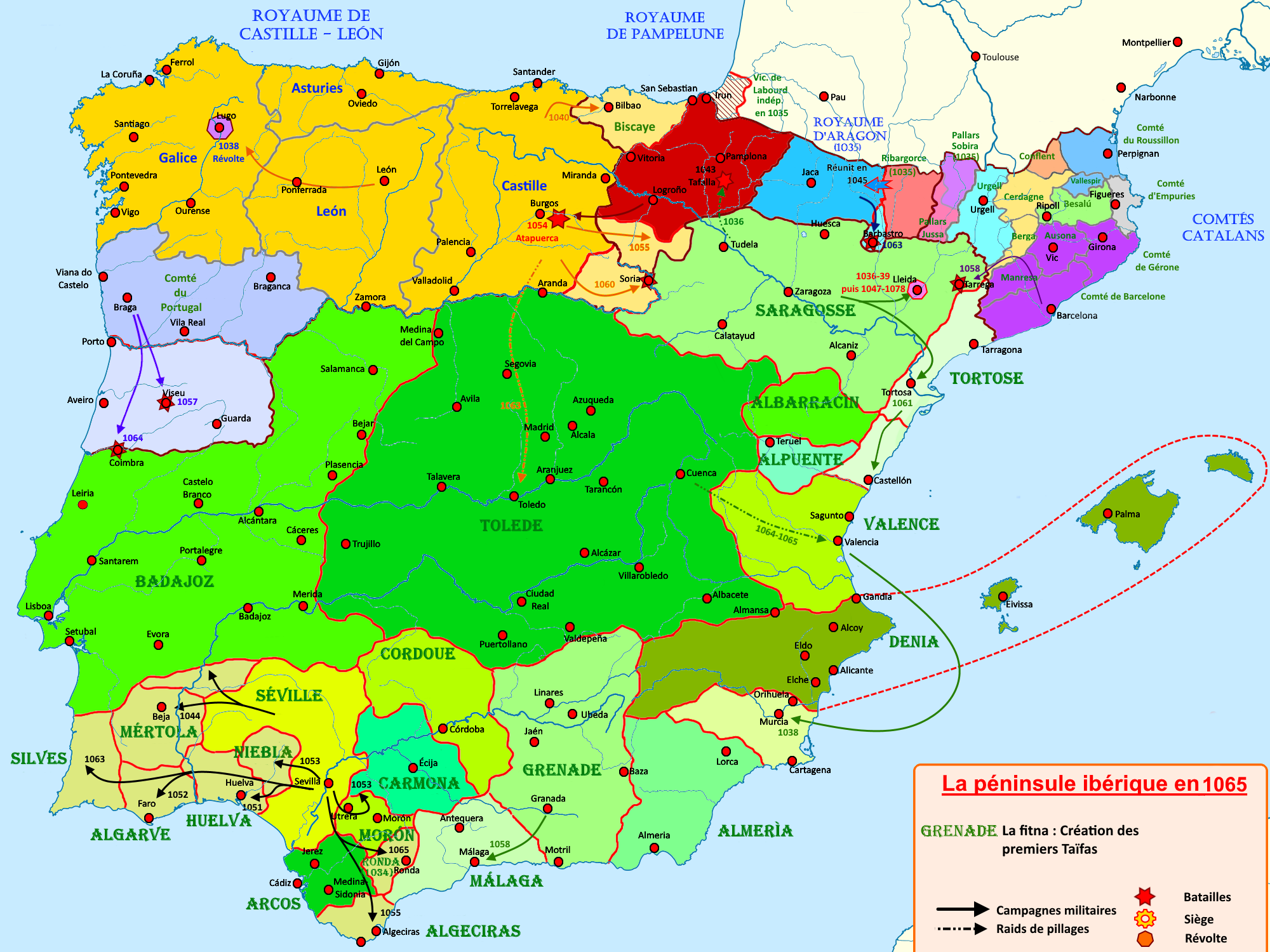
The Iberian peninsula in 1065.

In 1054, Emperor Ferdinand I of León prepared a military campaign in Tierra de Campos with the intention of recapturing the territories which had been lost to the Muslims in the west of the peninsula. In the summer of the following year he crossed the river Douro from Zamora and entered Portugal. Lamego was reconquered on 29 November 1057 after a hard campaign, the Muslim inhabitants of this town were enslaved and their property expropriated for the restoration of local churches.

The reconquest of Viseu followed in 1058, and the attackers were encouraged by the spirit of revenge over the death of King Alfonso during the siege of 1028. The emperor captured the castles of Seia, Tarouca, Lamego, castle of Marialva, São Martinho de Mouro, Travanca, and Penalva do Castelo among other strongholds.

In 1063, the Emperor carried out a large raid against the taifas of Seville and Badajoz, from which he began receiving tribute and in this same year the mozarabic lord of Tentúgal, Dom Sisnando Davides proposed to Emperor Ferdinand the capture of nearby Coimbra. Dom Sesnando had served in the Court of Cordoba and married the daughter of the last count of Portugal. The Emperor accepted the proposal and an expedition was prepared in December. After a pilgrimage to Santiago de Compostela that included the entire royal family, Coimbra was beset on January 20, 1064, and fell to Christian hands on July 9, 1064, after a six-month siege. Dom Sesnando was attributed the city and the region as Count of Coimbra, a position which he would hold until his death in 1091.

=== Revolt in Portugal, 1071 ===
When Emperor Ferdinand died in 1065, his realm was divided among this three sons and his third son Garcia received the Kingdom of Galicia, with the counties of Portugal and Coimbra. Garcia was described as a "stern character, and preferred to govern rather by terror than by affection." Six years later, the barons of Portugal revolted under the leadership of count Nuno Mendes, but he was defeated and killed at the Battle of Pedroso, struck between Braga and the Cávado. The title and office of Count of Portugal was abolished and Portugal lost its autonomy.

After the Battle of Pedroso, Garcia became more tyrannical and resentment grew across the kingdom. This caused his brother Sancho II of León to take over his kingdom and expel Garcia, in which he met scarcely any resistance. Garcia fled with just 300 knights to the Andalus and the Muslims helped him recover some castles, but he was captured in battle and inprisoned. Sancho II died in 1072 and was succeeded by his brother Alfonso VI.

=== Capture of Santarém, Lisbon and Sintra, 1093 ===
The Muslims of Iberia appealed for aid to the Almoravids, who had conquered Senegal and the Maghreb and founded a new capital at Marrakesh, "implanting a fanatical and puritanical reform". After the disastrous Battle of Sagrajas in 1086, king Alfonso VI of León in turn appealed to France for help. Numerous French knights travelled to León the following year and among them were Raymond of Burgundy and Henry of Burgundy.

In 1090, Raymond of Burgundy married the daughter and heir of Emperor Alfonso VI and was later given the title of count of Galicia with authority over all the territory in the west of the peninsula from Galicia to Coimbra. The mozarabic count of Coimbra Martim Moniz de Ribadouro on the other hand was sacked from his position.

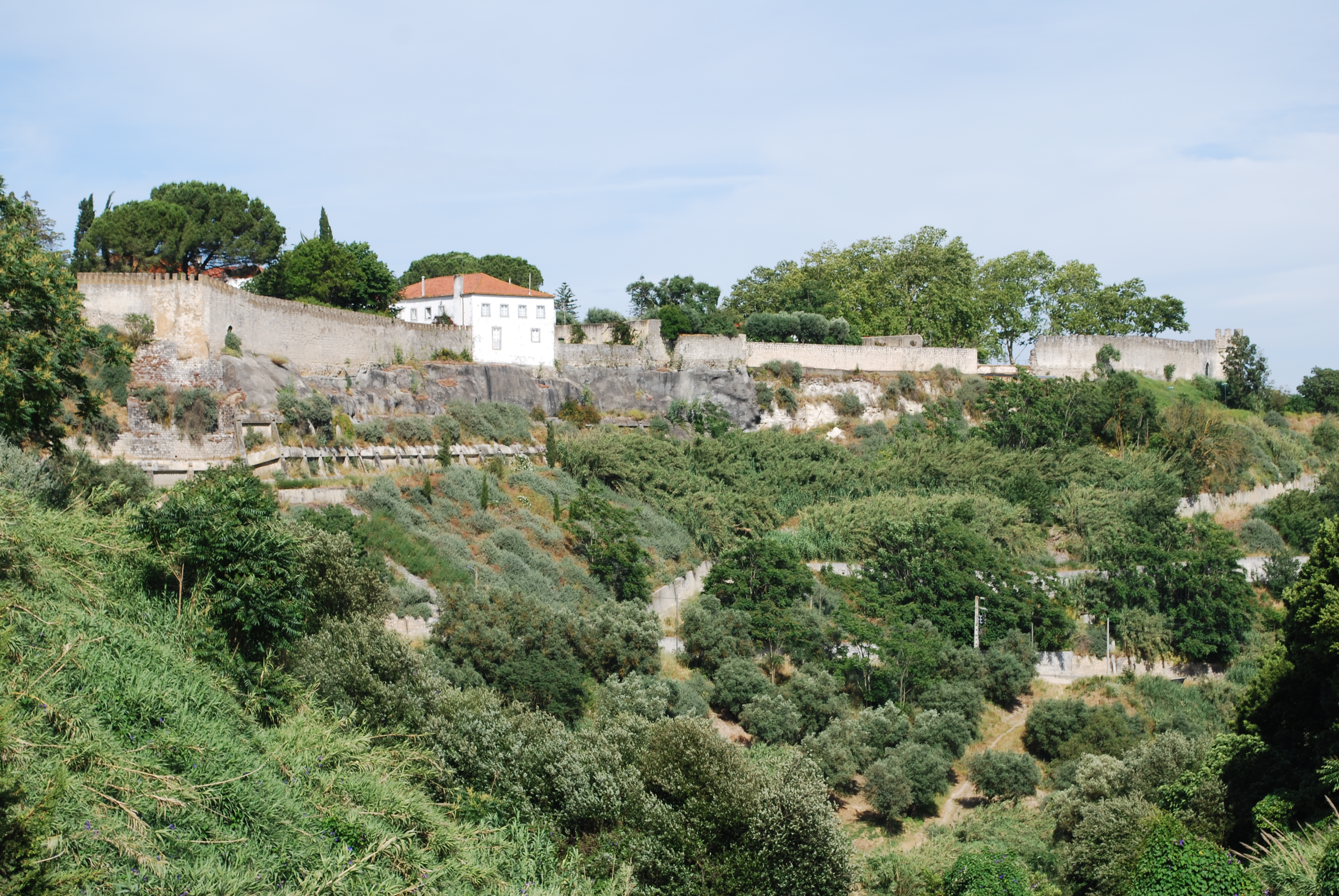
Walls of the citadel of Santarém.

At a time when the Almoravid emir Yusuf Ibn Tashfin sought to annex all the small taifa states in the peninsula, the emir of Badajoz offered to become a tributary vassal of Leon and to hand over the cities of Lisbon, Sintra and Santarém in exchange for military protection. The Emperor was in Coimbra on April 22, 1093, and on the occasion confirmed the charter of privileges of this city. Lisbon, Sintra and Santarém were then occupied between April 30 and May 8, 1093. Soeiro Mendes was appointed governor of the territory ceded by the emir of Badajoz. Mendes was subordinate to Raymond, tasked with defending all the territory from Galicia to the Tagus.

== Almoravid campaigns, 1094–1135 ==
The delivery of territory to Christians caused outrage among Muslims in Andaluz and the Maghreb and the residents of Santarém, Lisbon and Sintra requested the Almoravid emir Yusuf Ibn Tashfin to intervene on their behalf, shortly after Soeiro Mendes had taken possession of the territory. A few months later in 1093 still, the Almoravid general Seyr landed in Iberia with a numerous army and orders to recapture Badajoz, Lisbon, Sintra and Santarém.

Badajoz was captured by the Almoravid in the Spring of 1094 before Raymond could intervene. After marching out ahead of a force he was routed in battle and forced to return to Christian territory. Lisbon and Sintra then surrendered to the Almoravids that same year. Soeiro Mendes however resisted vigorously in Santarém against an Almoravid siege until Seyr withdrew to north Africa.

=== Reestablishment of the county of Portugal ===
Flag of the count of Portugal

Count Raymonds lack of capacity against the Muslims resulted in his loss of prestige at the Leonese Court. In 1096 his cousin Henry was made new Count of Portugal and attributed the territory between the river Minho and Mondego.

In 1102, count Henry defeated a Muslim force at the Battle of Arouca, together with Egas Moniz.

In 1108 and 1109, King Sigurd of Norway sailed along the western coast of Iberia on his way to the Holy Land with 60 ships and 5,000 men, in what would become known as the Norwegian Crusade. Having departed in the autumn of 1107, a year later the Norwegians wintered on the coast of Galicia with the permission of a local lord, but, lacking provisions, they pillaged his castle. On their way to the Mediterranean, they sailed up the Ribeira de Colares, which at that time was not yet silted up, and then plundered the castle of Sintra or Colares, fought against the garrison of Lisbon near the city and then plundered Alcácer do Sal.

Count Henry of Portugal did not limit his action to the southern Portuguese border. On 24 January 1110, the Count joined forces with King Alfonso I of Aragon to defeat the Emir of Zaragoza, Al-Musta'in II, at the Battle of Valtierra, near Tudela.

=== Loss of Santarém, 1111 ===
In 1110 Count Henry dispatched the adail Soeiro Fromarigues to Santarém with a number of troops to reinforce the city against the almoravids, who threatened the southern frontier. These forces were however attacked while encamped at Vatalandi, an unknown location close to the Tagus. Soeiro Fromarigues and the knight Miro Crescones were killed in action.

The following year, Santarém was again besieged by an army led by Seyr. Lacking sufficient forces to resist effectively or sure relief, the city fell to the Almoravids and the county of Santarém was abolished.

Count Henry died in 1112 and his wife Teresa took over as regent for their young son Afonso Henriques.

=== Almoravid campaigns, 1116–1117 ===
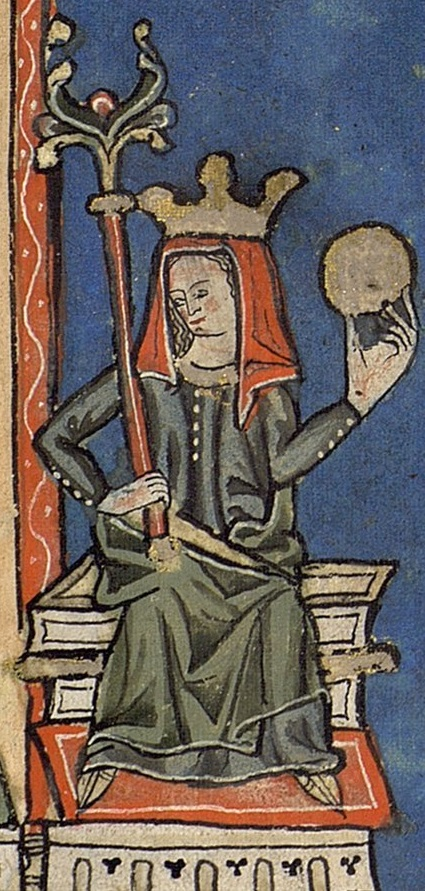
The regent-countess Teresa.

New Almoravid attacks had been expected ever since the death of Count Henry, however only in 1116 did an Almoravid army commanded by Abd al-Malik advance against Coimbra and its territory. The Almoravids massacred the garrison of the castle of Miranda do Corvo and captured the garrison of Santa Eulália, including its alcaide Diogo Galinha. The inhabitants of Soure abandoned their castle and sought refuge in Coimbra. Its outskirts were attacked and destroyed, after which the Almoravids withdrew south.

This same year the Almoravids captured Mallorca, the last independent taifa state in Iberia, thus bringing the entirety of the Andaluz under their authority.

Coimbra was attacked in 1117 by the Almoravid emir Ali Ibn Yusuf at the head of a large army which included both Africans as well as Andalucians, "as many as the grains of sand of the sea" according to one source. On this occasion the Almoravids landed at Montemor-o-Velho and proceeded to sack the outer suburbs from there, capturing and killing people. The Portuguese once more sought refuge behind the walls of Coimbra, where the regent-Countess Teresa could be found at this time.

The city was subjected to almost daily assaults beginning in late June, but the Almoravids were unable to capture Coimbra. After 20 days Ali Ibn Yusuf withdrew to Seville in early July. Thousands perished in the attack. The siege of Coimbra marked the height of Almoravid power in Iberia. Keeping Coimbra would have proven difficult for the Almoravids. After the successful defense of Coimbra, Teresa henceforth signed as "queen".

=== Establishment of the Templars in Portugal ===
Templar cross.

The Templars settled in Portugal after Teresa donated the Castle of Soure to the order on 19 March 1128. The castle had been erected close to Coimbra in the second half of the 11th century by Sisnando Davides, on the road that connected Coimbra to Lisbon. The official act of donation took place in Braga, in the presence of Raymond Bernard, who had been recruited by Hughes de Payens to serve as one of a possible group of Templar scouts that would seek donations for the Order. The Templars found enthusiastic support in Portugal, whereas Teresas suzerain, Alfonso VII was not particularly enthralled with the new militia, though he did confirm the donation of Soure.

In addition to Soure, the countess and around twenty or so magnates granted the Templars Fonte Arcada in Penafiel, along with many other properties in Minho and Galicia. Little is known about the first fifteen years of the Templars in Portugal, and their activities are likely to have been limited to the collection of rent to be sent overseas. The Order would only acquire fame when the first procurator of the Temple Hugo de Martone set up a community at Soure in 1143.

== Definitive conquest of Estremadura, 1135–1148 ==
After the Battle of São Mamede on July 24, 1128, Afonso Henriques took over the county of Portugal from his mother Teresa.

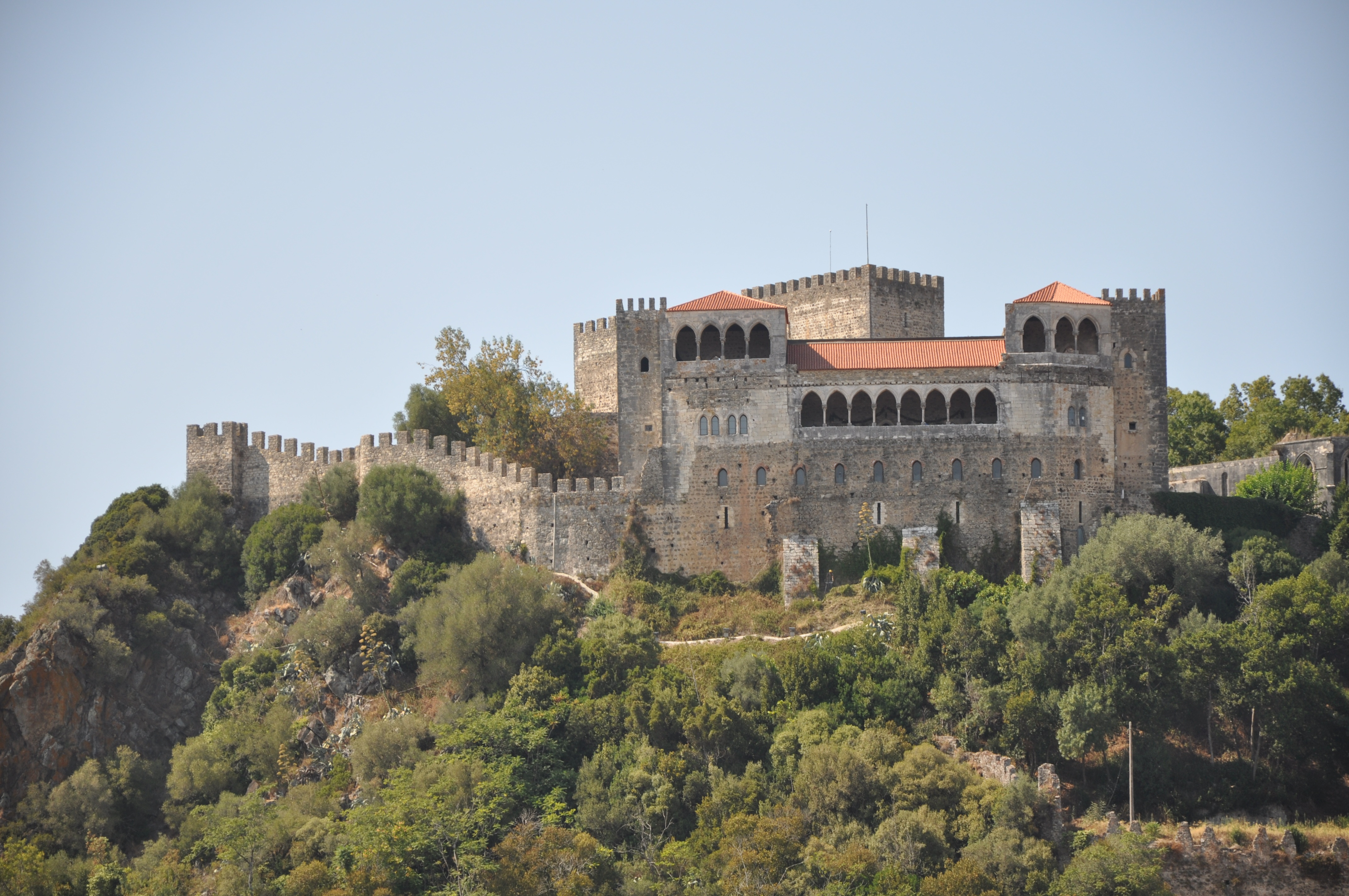
Leiria castle.

In order to bolster the defenses of Coimbra against the raids that the Almoravids conducted on the region every year in the Spring and Summer, in December 1135 Afonso Henriques built the Castle of Leiria, overlooking a road in the no man's land roughly halfway between Coimbra and Santarém. The famed warrior Dom Paio Guterres was appointed as its castellan with a strong garrison. It was tasked not only with defending the access to Coimbra from the south, but also to attack Santarém and its surrounding territory, raiding fields, taking captives and ambushing caravans, until the city was weak enough to be taken by assault. The founding of Leiria was the first hostile act carried out by Afonso towards the Muslims and it followed a general tendency among the Christian realms of Iberia to leave the defensive and pass on the offensive, as the Leonese had already begun to do in 1132.

The year after the founding of Leiria, Afonso Henriques captured Ourém.

Dom Paio Guterres launched so many successful raids against Santarém that in 1137 the castle was assaulted and razed, with over 250 men among knights and footmen being killed. Paio Guterres however, managed to escape back to Portugal. Leiria was reoccupied by the Portuguese sometime between 1137 and 1140.

=== The Battle of Ourique, 1139 ===
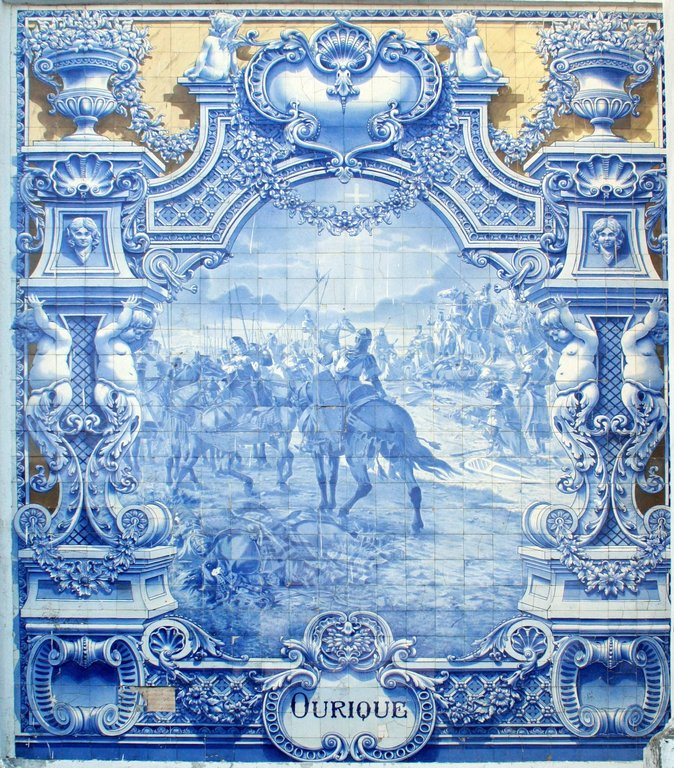
Commeorative azulejo tile panel dedicated to the Battle of Ourique.

After the Treaty of Tuy was signed and peace sealed with Emperor Alfonso VII of León, king Afonso Henriques led a major raid in Muslim territory. The moment was well selected as the Leonese had laid sieged Oreja and the Almoravids would have been preoccupied with aiding the beleaguered castle. Little resistance could thus be mounted by the western garrisons against the Portuguese king and his troops, who faced little resistance as they advanced.

The Portuguese numbered about 800 to 1000 knights and 1600 to 2000 footmen, among spearmen and crossbowmen. On their way back they were intercepted by a Muslim force commanded by "Esmar", likely the governor of Cordoba Muhammad Az-Zubayr Ibn Umar at Ourique. The Muslim commander had gathered whatever forces could be collected from Beja, Badajoz, Évora, Seville and Elvas, thereby forming a relatively numerous host.

When they attempted to attack the Portuguese camp set upon a hill however, the Portuguese sallied out to meet them on the open field and routed them with a heavy cavalry charge.

On the day of the Battle of Ourique, Afonso was acclaimed as king by his men in the old Germanic fashion, by being raised atop his shield. Henceforth he signed always as "rex".

=== The Battle of Trancoso ===
After the Battle of Ourique, King Afonso turned his host to Leon once more and invaded Galicia. Esmar regrouped his forces in Santarém in preparation for a counterattack. With the Portuguese king away with his forces further north, Leiria was thus attacked, razed and part of its garrison was killed in the attack, with Dom Paio Guterres being this time taken into captivity. The Muslim horsemen then ventured deep into Portuguese territory as far as Trancoso, which they sacked.

In Galicia meanwhile, Afonso Henriques signed a peace treaty with King Afonso VII of León following the Battle of Arcos de Valdevez. He then set out southwards, crossed the Douro near Lamego and led a cavalry charge against the Muslim tropps camped in Trancoso, whom he routed in two encounters. On his return from this campaign, he founded the Arouca Abbey.

=== First siege of Lisbon, 1142 ===
In 1142, a fleet of English and Norman crusaders who had departed from Southampton and Hasting on their way to the Holy Land called at Gaia, blown off-course due to bad weather. King Afonso convinced them to support his projected campaign against Lisbon, the ownership of which would yield him the control of all the territory between Leiria and the Tagus in one fell swoop. The crusader fleet sailed up the Tagus as the Portuguese approached Lisbon on the land side, and although the outskirts of the city were sacked, the attack had to be called off, presumably because king Afonso underestimated the undertaking.

Afonso is likely to have refounded the Castle of Leiria on his return to Coimbra from his failed attack on Lisbon.

=== Destruction of Soure, 1144 ===
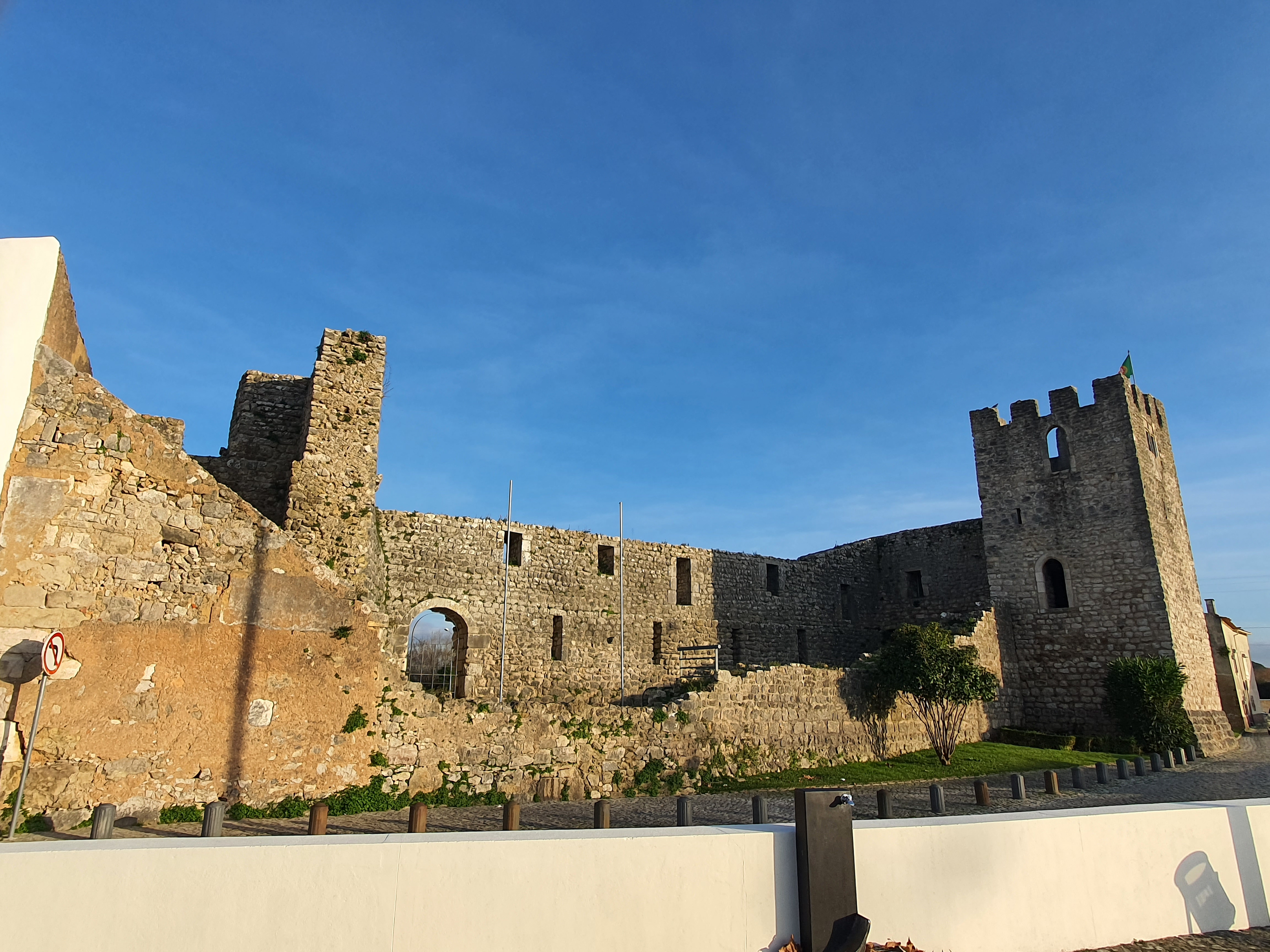
The Templar castle of Soure

Peace was sealed with Leon in October 1143 by the Treaty of Zamora, which at the same time secured for Afonso recognition from Leon of his claim to the title of king, as well as the northern Portuguese border against Leonese attack. Later that year in 13 December, Afonso Henriques offered himself as a vassal of the Holy See and to pay a yearly tribute of four ounces of gold. It was accepted the following spring.

Cross-borders raids between Portugal and al-Andalus continued unabated and took place every spring. In 1144 an Almoravid force under the command of the qaid Abu Zakaria left Santarém and attacked the frontier castle of Soure, belonging to the Knights Templar. The Templars made a sortie, but they were routed and the majority of them taken prisoner, Abu Zakaria then returning to Santarém with his forces. This was the first known time the Templars were involved in a military action in Portugal.

=== The Muridun Revolt 1144–1145 ===
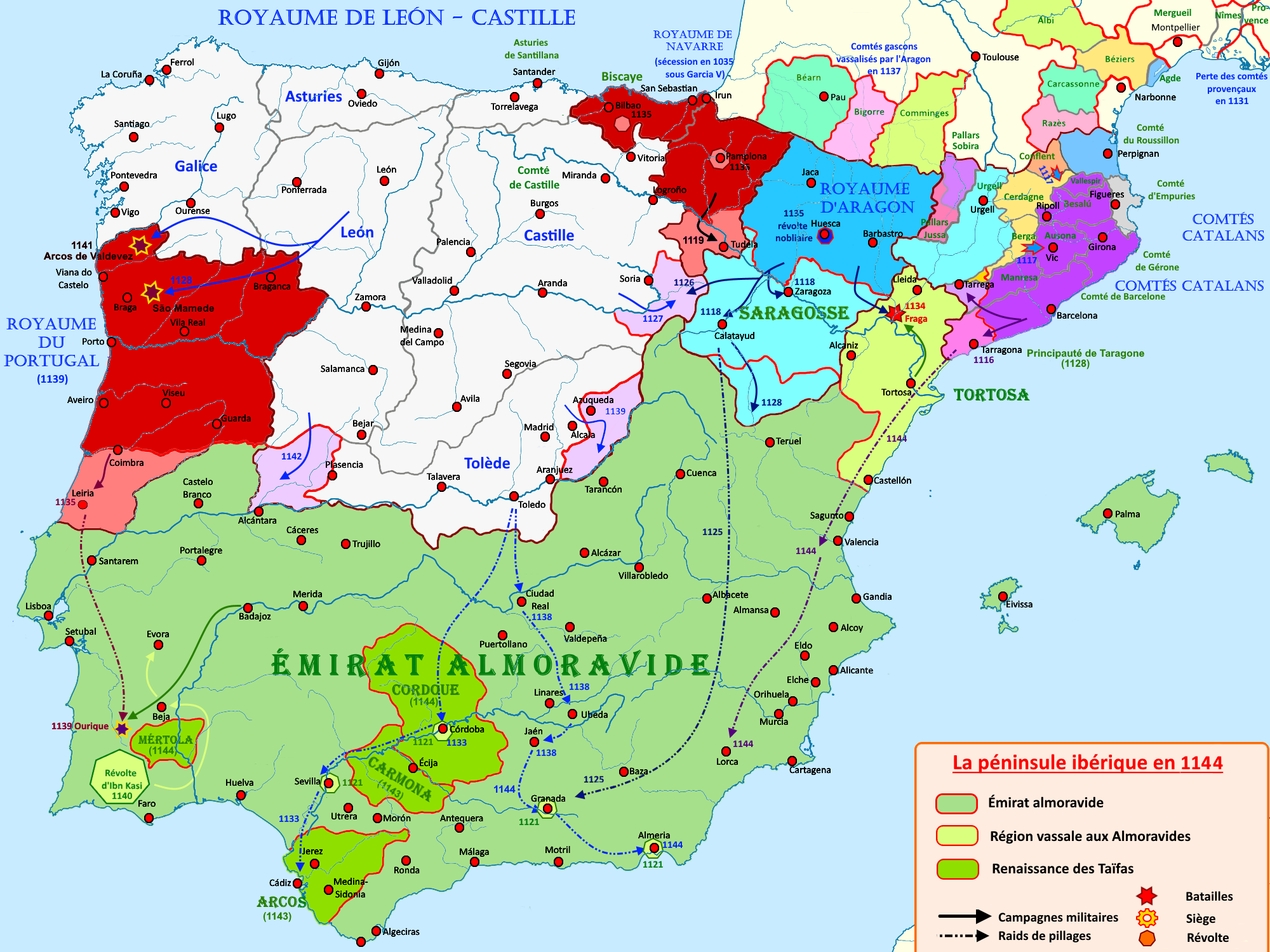
The Iberian peninsula in 1144.

Almoravid power in Iberia began to crumble in 1144 when the muridun staged a major revolt in the Gharb, led by the Sufi mystic Ibn Qasi. Ibn Qasi was a radical anti-Almoravid millenarian whose writings displayed strong Ismaili esoterist tendencies and had given up leisurely life. A complex combination of Almohad theology, claims to messianism, a spiritualist idea of Islam, the legal pedantry of Islamic Maliki jurists and the disturbing amount of wealth of the ulama probably lay at the root of his revolt. He captured Mértola with the help of Ibn al-Qabila and 70 murids in 1144. With the aid of governor of Évora Ibn Wazir and Muhammad Ibn al-Mundhir Ibn Qasi captured Silves, Évora, Beja, Huelva, Niebla and organized two unsuccessful attacks against Seville and Cordoba. The revolt of the muridun greatly weakened the ability of the Almoravids to respond to external threats, indirectly aiding the Christians.

The muridun split in 1145 and Ibn Qasi was deposed by Ibn Wazir. He then joined the Almohads, who placed him in charge of Silves. That same year, Afonso Henriques led a raid into Muslim territory that reached as far as Beja, from which he and his party returned loaded with spoils. In 1145 still, the Templars were granted the castle of Longroiva by Afonso Henriques' sister Sancha and her husband Fernão Mendes de Bragança II.

=== Conquest of Santarém, 1147 ===
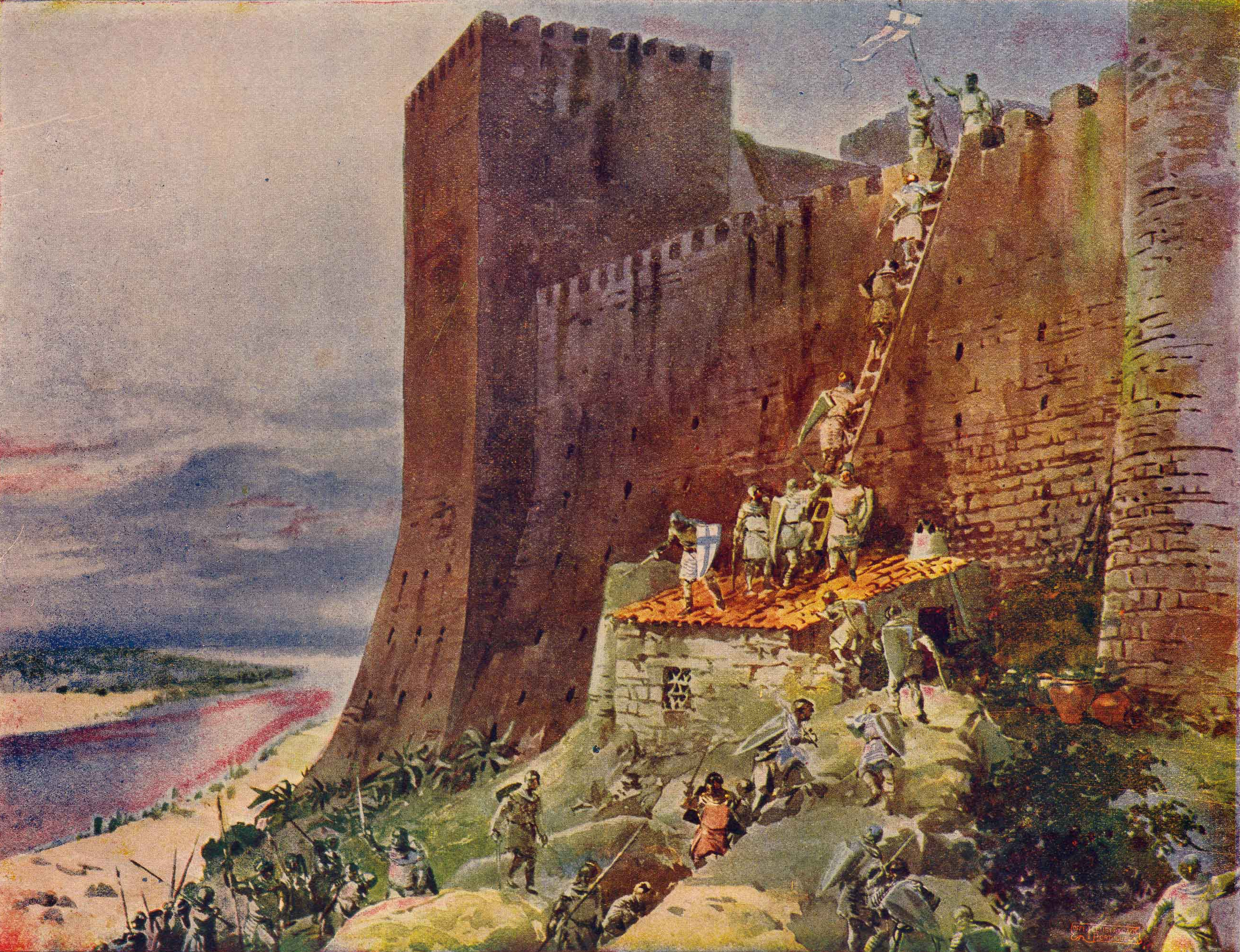
The scaling of Santarém, by Roque Gameiro.

Santarém was at the time the most dangerous city to Portuguese frontiers as it was from there that the Muslims launched most of their raids that ravaged the centre of Portugal. The castle of Santarém crowned a mountain-top overlooking the Tagus and the exceptionally fertile fields all around. The city was strongly defended and king Afonso lacked the resources and engineers to take it in a formal siege. Long years of experience in warfare induced king Afonso to try and capture it via a cunning ruse.

The moment to attack Santarém had been well picked as the Almoravid authority was disintegrating in Iberia and in Africa due to revolts. In order to spy the defenses of Santarém and the best places for a night-time attack with scaling ladders, Afonso dispatched Mem Ramires to the city under the pretext of a fictitious business.

Mem Ramires returned with an encouraging report and a plan, offering to lead the assault over the city walls. On March 10 the king departed from Coimbra with a small force, which was joined along the way by Templar knights from Soure. At the end of four days march done by night and by secondary paths, they camped at Pernes on a Friday. Only then did the king reveal the objective of the expedition to his men. The troops approached Santarém overnight and before dawn of the following day, the walls of the city were scaled by a party of men commanded by Mem Ramires. Although they were detected by the sentries, they nonentheless managed to open the gates to the king and his men, waiting outside. Thus the city was breached, sacked and fell under Portuguese control on the 15th of March.

With the fall of Santarém, the only major strongholds that remained in Muslim hands in the region were Lisbon and Sintra.

=== Conquest of Lisbon, 1147 ===
After the fall of Edessa, Pope Eugenius III called for a new crusade. Under these circumstances a new crusader fleet anchored at Porto on June 16, 1147, on their way to the Middle East. The Bishop of Porto Pedro Pitões II convinced them to participate in the projected siege to Lisbon.

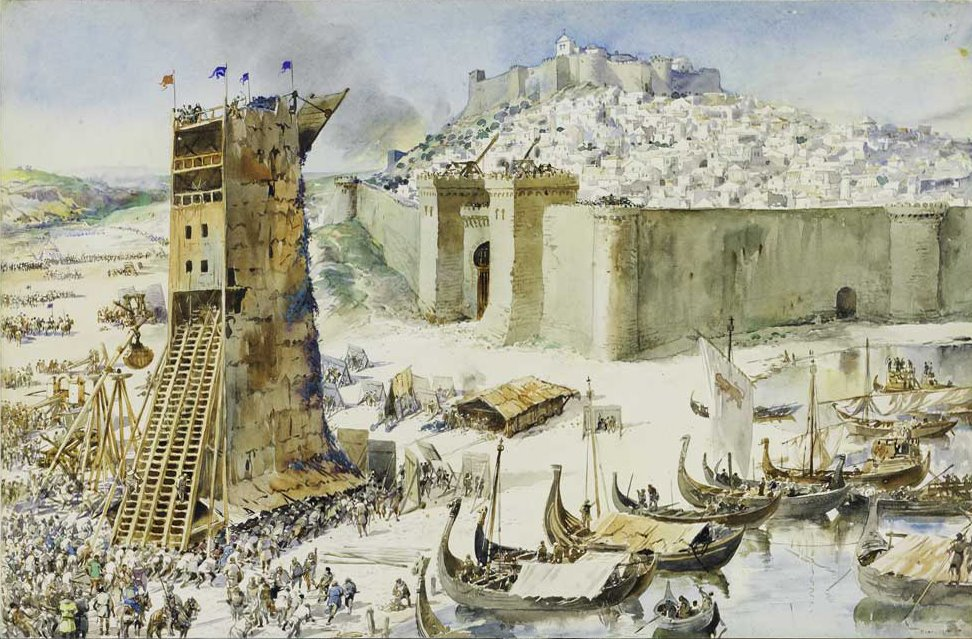
The siege of Lisbon, illustrated by Roque Gameiro.

The host of Afonso Henriques departed from Coimbra on 6 of June and when the crusader fleet sailed up the Tagus on June 28, the Portuguese had already pitched camp in Mount São Gens, to the north. The king was accompanied by some of the most distinguished figures among the nobility at the time, such as Fernão Mendes II of Braganza and the royal ensign Fernão Peres Cativo, along with other minor nobles such as Martim Moniz, who would perish in the siege. The Portuguese probably numbered about 3000 men, while the crusaders totalled 10,000 to 13,000 persons.

On June 29 the king met with the main crusader leaders in order to decide how the spoils would be divided, and it was agreed that the crusaders would keep whatever plunder they carry, the prisoners and their ransom, as well as future trading rights, while the king would keep the city and its houses, so he could reward them as a prize to the participants of the siege who expressed the desire to settle in Lisbon.

The Muslims refused an offer to surrender peacefully. The Portuguese pitched their camp to the north of the city, while the English and Normans pitched theirs to the west, and the Germans and Flemish to the east. The Monastery of São Vicente de Fora now stands where the Germanic contingent camped. A harsh siege followed in which the outer suburbs were violently taken and traction trebuchets, underground mines and a large movable siege tower were used. At the end of three months and 20 days the Muslim defenders were severely afflicted by hunger and plague due to a lack of room to bury the dead and asked to surrender. The king solemnly entered the city on October 25.

=== Conquest of western Estremadura, 1148 ===
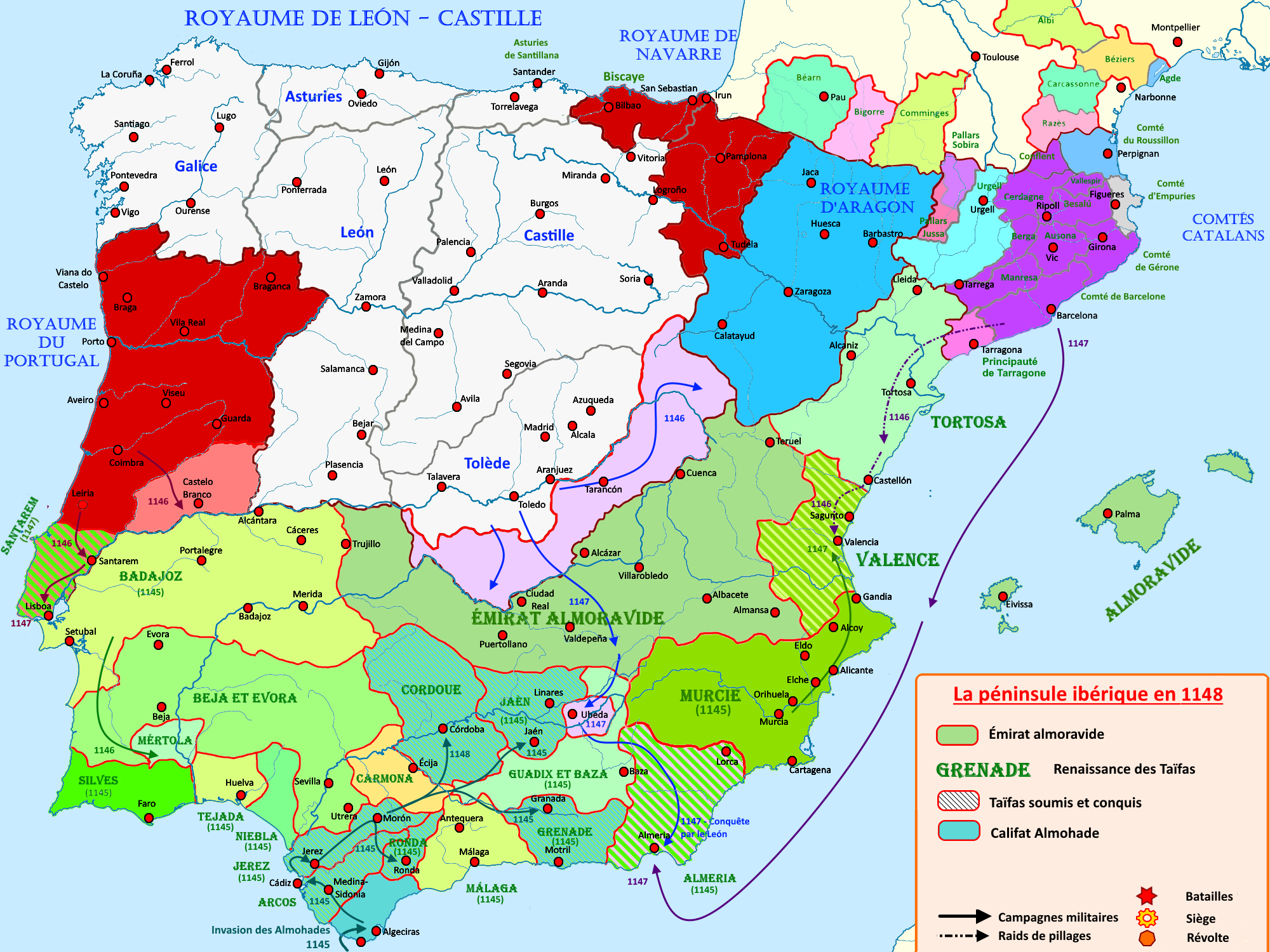
The Iberian peninsula in 1148.

Though Santarém, Lisbon and Sintra fell to the Portuguese in 1147, most of the region remained unsubdued as the Muslims still controlled a considerable number of important towns and castles. Some would have to be taken by force as not all accepted Christian rule willingly.

Óbidos was an important fortified town north of Lisbon, set upon a hilltop. Less than three months after the capture of Lisbon, it was taken during on the night of 10 January 1148 by a group of men led by Gonçalo Mendes da Maia. That same year, Torres Novas and Porto de Mós were also taken. Alenquer was sieged in April and taken two months later on June 24. Torres Vedras had stout walls and it put up stubborn resistance, but it was taken by force on August 15, and all its occupants who had not managed to escape were massacred. On 8 December, Abrantes was captured.

== Dispute for the Alentejo, 1148–1191 ==
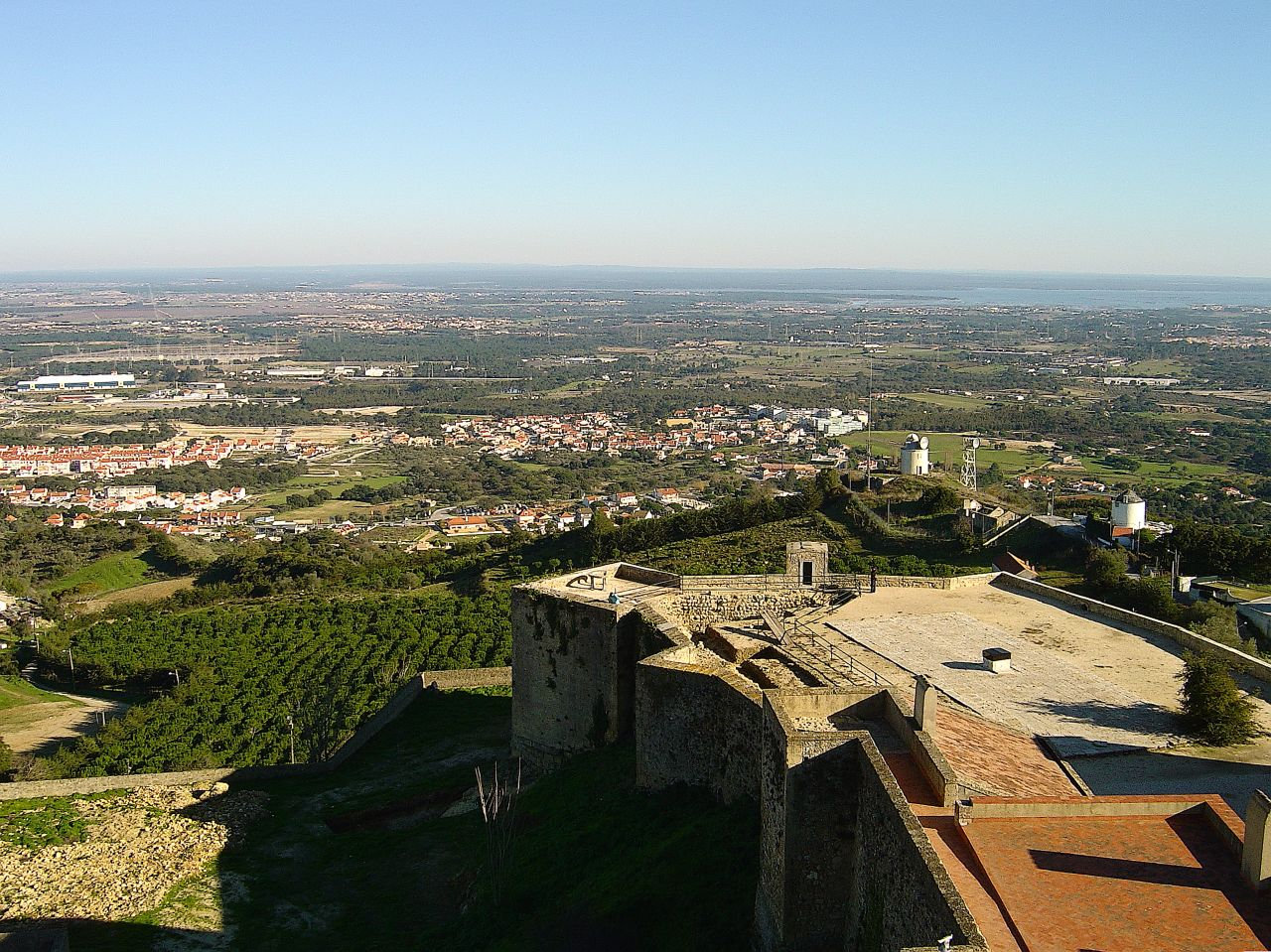
View from the castle of Palmela.

The first steps south of the Tagus were taken when Almada was captured during the siege of Lisbon, while Palmela was abandoned by its garrison when Lisbon fell into the hands of the Portuguese. The Alentejo was to be the scene of conflict between the Portuguese and Muslims for 91 years.

Afonso Henriques tried to personally take Alcácer do Sal by surprise in 1151 at the head of a party of men, like he had done at Santarém, however the Portuguese were detected and the king wounded, hence he returned to Lisbon. That same year King Afonso laid plans for another attack on Alcácer do Sal and the English Bishop of Lisbon Gilbert of Hastings was sent to England to obtain help. Three years later, Alcácer do Sal was attacked with the support of English knights, however the Muslim stronghold resisted. A third attack was made against Alcácer in 1157 with the support of a crusader fleet commanded by the count of Flanders Thierry of Alsace however the Christians were rebuffed once more.

In neighbouring León, Emperor Alfonso VII died on August 21, 1157, and his passing was to have important repercussions throughout Iberia. After thirty years of stable leadership, León and Castile were divided between Ferdinand II of León and Sancho III of Castile. The balance of power among the Christian kingdoms of northern Iberia was now more evenly distributed among Portugal, León, Castile, Aragon and Navarre.

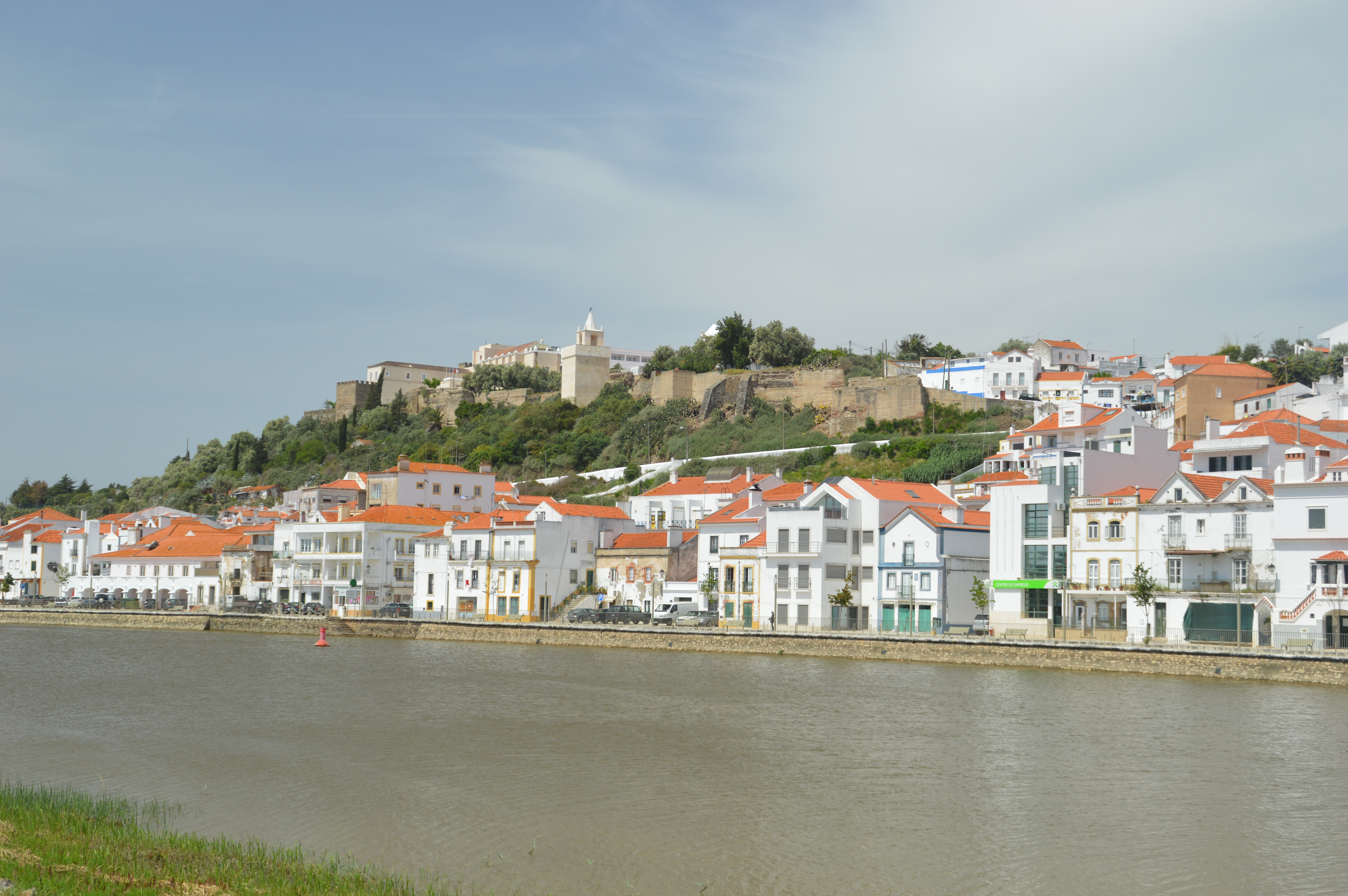
The Castle of Alcácer do Sal.

News of the situation in León quickly reached Portugal. Though a Leonese invasion was a probable threat, Afonso launched a new campaign against the Muslims to the south, either to relieve pressure on his neighbours or more likely to garner political benefits from successful military action, chief among them Papal approval, which demonstrates the importance placed by king Afonso on international opinion. In April 1158 Alcácer do Sal was attacked for the fourth time and taken at the end of a sixty days siege, on 24 June. The open fields of the Alentejo lay open to the Portuguese. After the fall of Alcácer do Sal, Santiago do Cacém further to the south was also captured.

While the siege of Alcácer do Sal was ongoing, Ferdinand II of León and Sancho III of Castile met at the monastery of Sahagun in May 1158. Though distrustful of each other, they agreed not to negotiate any treaties with Afonso of Portugal, whose kingdom they hoped to conquer and divide amongst themselves. This plan was cut short just a few weeks later when Sancho died and was succeeded on the throne by his three-year-old son Alfonso VIII, which further altered the dynamics of Iberian politics as Castile was now vulnerable to encroachment, particularly by Ferdinand II of León.

Beja was taken by militiamen from Santarém in December 1159.

=== The first Almohad invasion of Portugal, 1161 ===
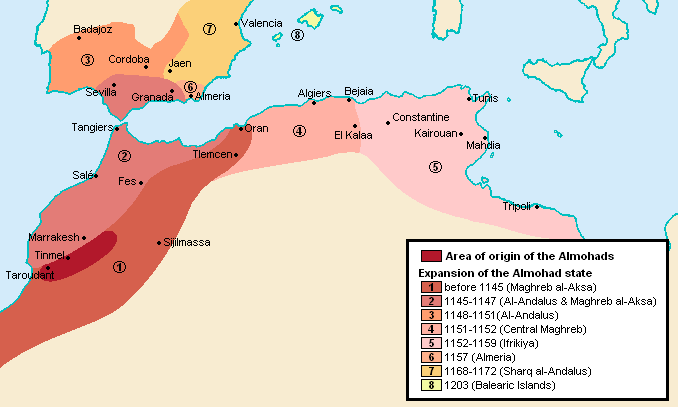
Almohad expansion in north Africa and Iberia.

The entirety of the Maghreb was fully conquered by the Almohad Caliph Abd al-Mumin in 1160. The Almohads followed a radical version of Islam which placed great emphasis on holy war and tolerated neither Christians or Jews under their rule. They were now free to focus on the Iberian peninsula and Abd al-Mumin crossed the Strait of Gibraltar at the head of a large army of 18,000 men at the end of that year. Informed of the progress of the Portuguese south of the Tagus, he sent a detachment commanded by Abu Mohammed Abdallah ben Hafs to the western part of the peninsula.

King Afonso gathered his host and took the field but at the Battle of Alcácer do Sal, the Portuguese were routed by the Almohads. Beja was evacuated and all the territory south of the Tagus was abandoned to the Almohads, with the exception of the port city of Alcácer do Sal, which remained as a bastion of Christian defense.

Abu Hafs did not press further north after the Battle of Alcácer do Sal and was called back. Mohammed Ali al-Hadj was appointed wali of the Gharb and defender of its frontiers. The Almohad Caliph then returned to North Africa with his troops.

=== The campaigns of Gerald the Fearless ===
King Afonso and the Portuguese nobility sought to recover their losses after the Battle of Alcácer do Sal and left any further campaigns south of the Tagus to their subordinates momentarily. Beja was captured once again in a night attack on 30 November 1162, in the middle of winter, by knights from Santarém commanded by Fernando Gonçalves. A succession dispute kept Almohad troops busy in Africa after the death of Abd al-Mumin in 1163, and independent bands of brigands or free lances began to proliferate throughout the Gharb, which became a battlefield between Christians and Muslims.

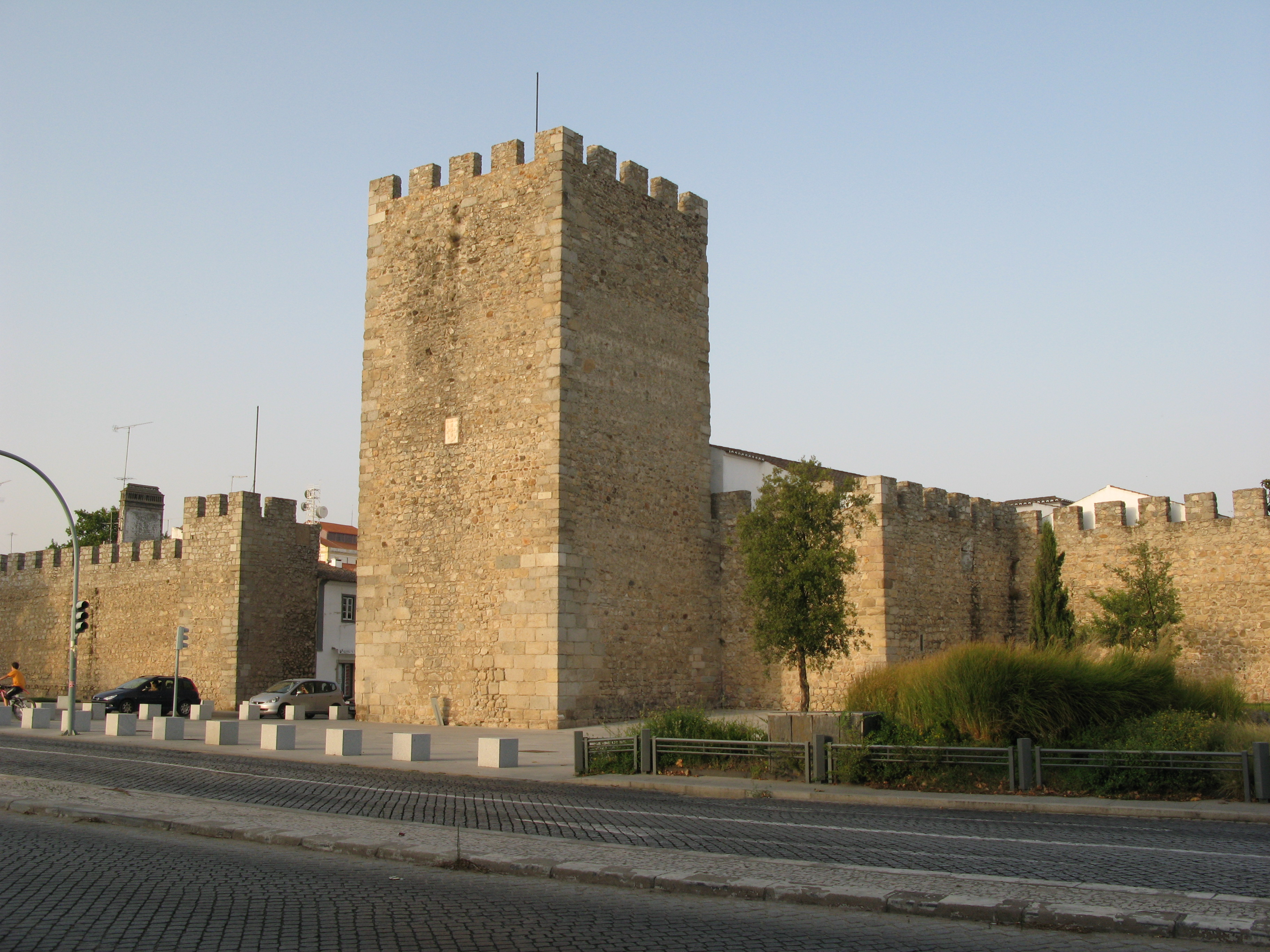
City walls of Évora.

In 21 February 1165 Sesimbra was taken by force after Afonso Henriques was informed that its castle was poorly defended. After Sesimbra had fallen to the Christians, the Almohad governor of Badajoz marched to the region with an army to recapture it, but he was defeated at the Battle of Palmela, and this town surrendered afterwards. On a night of October or November this year, Geraldo the Fearless took Évora in the middle of the night, and then offered the city to Afonso Henriques, apparently in exchange for a large sum of money, and the king then made him its castellan.

The perfidious Galician Afonso Henriques, lord of Coimbra – cursed by God! – knew well the bravery of that dog Geraldo. His constant thought was to treacherously take cities and castles, with his own people alone: he had the Muslims on the frontier terrified of his weapons. This dog would proceeded as follows: he advanced, unnoticed, on a rainy, dark, gloomy night, and went against the enemy cities insensitive to wind and snow. To do this, he carried long wooden ladders, so that he could climb over the walls of the city he sought to take by surprise; and when the Muslim guard was asleep, he would lean the ladders against the wall and was the first to climb the castle. And, grabbing the guard, he would say:

"Shout as you do at night when there is nothing to report!"

Then his men-at-arms would climb onto the city walls, cry out a loud and horrible wail in their own language, enter the city, kill everyone they found, despoil them, and carry off all the prisoners and spoils that were there.

— Ibn Sahib as-Salah

Cross of Calatrava.

Still in 1165, king Afonso sought to reinforce the frontier and so on 30 November he granted to the Templars the border territory between the rivers Erges, Zêzere and Tagus, with the castles of Idanha-a-Velha and Monsanto.

The following year in 1166, Geraldo took Trujillo, Cáceres, Montánchez, Alconchel, Serpa and Juromenha, the last of which became his base for attacks against the major city of Badajoz. In 1166 still the warrior monks of a recently created Catholic military Order settled at Évora, however by order of the Pope they were integrated in the Order of Calatrava. Afonso Henriques also captured on this year Coruche, Arronches, Elvas, and Odemira, the latter via a surprise amphibious attack, quietly sailing up the Mira River; during the attack, the Portuguese encountered little resistance.

In 1167, Monsaraz was captured by men of Geraldo the Fearless that had departed from Évora, while Gonçalo Mendes da Maia captured Noudar.

=== The siege of Badajoz, 1169 ===
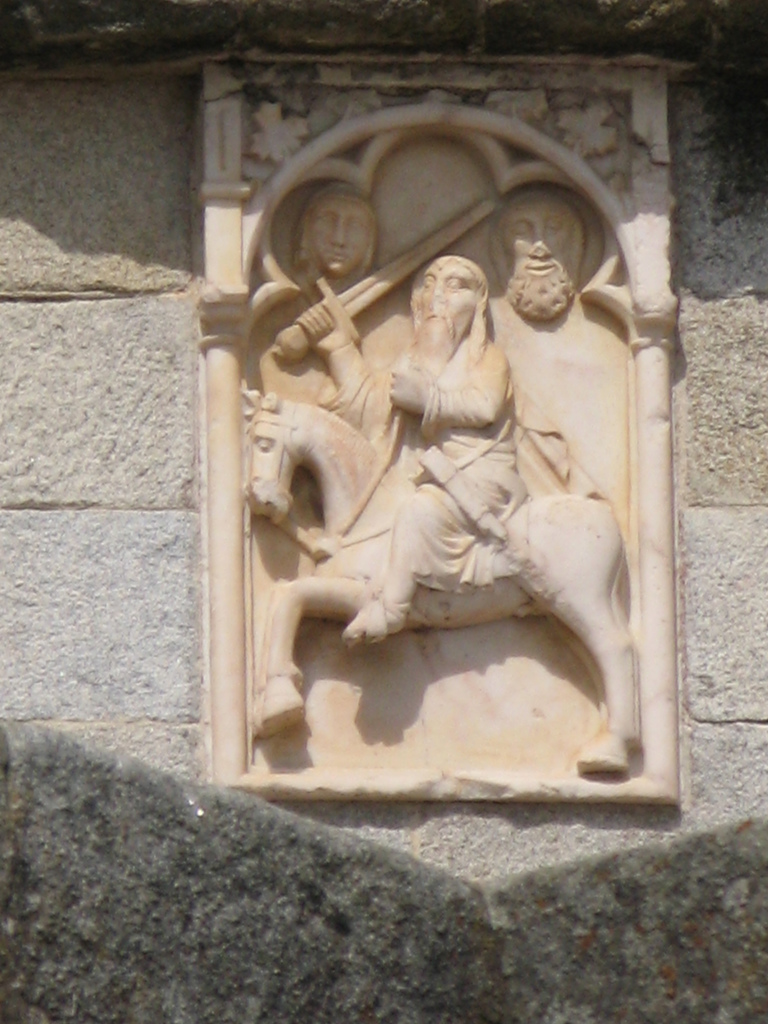
Sculpture of Geraldo the Fearless at the Cathedral of Évora.

Badajoz was one of the most important Almohad fortresses in the Andaluz and its authorities paid tribute to the Emperor of León. Due to the constant civil strife, its surrounding territory was by then depopulated.

War broke out between Portugal and León in 1167 and two years later Badajoz was attacked by Gerald the Fearless and his men, who scaled the walls and took over the city. Its garrison however withdrew to its high citadel, which the men of Geraldes proved unable to take hence they requested aid from Afonso Henriques.

The host of the Portuguese king arrived at Badajoz and settled within the city, however the defenders still in the high citadel were unexpectedly relieved not by the Almohad Caliph but by the Emperor of León and his army. When Afonso attempted to sally out with his men on horseback he broke his leg against the city gates and was then captured by the Leonese in Caia.

The Emperor of León treated the Portuguese king fairly and courteously, however Afonso Henriques still had to pay a king's ransom and relinquish captured territory in Galicia in exchange for liberty, which was granted after two months captivity. Though he spent some time at the São Pedro do Sul springs recovering, he was never able to ride a horse again.

Geraldo the Fearless was also captured, and was forced to relinquish the castles of Trujillo, Montanchez, Santa Cruz and Monfrague in exchange for his freedom.

=== Almohad attacks 1170–1173 ===
The debacle of Badajoz in 1169 did not demoralize the Portuguese. Just a few months after the siege, Gerald the Fearless resumed the raids against the region of Badajoz and after luring its garrison out via a feigned attack and retreat he ambushed it and routed it completely. On May 1170 he captured a large Almohad caravan of supplies dispatched to relieve the famine in Badajoz. As king Afonso was now physically unable to ride and therefore lead his host on campaign, prince Sancho was knighted at the Church of Santa Cruz in Coimbra on August 15, 1170. A few weeks later in September the prince led a new siege against the now severely weakened Badajoz but the city was once again relieved on time, not just by Leonese forces but by an Almohad army commanded by Abu Hafs Umar ibn Yahya al-Hintati as well. The Portuguese therefore withdrew in good order in October or early November.

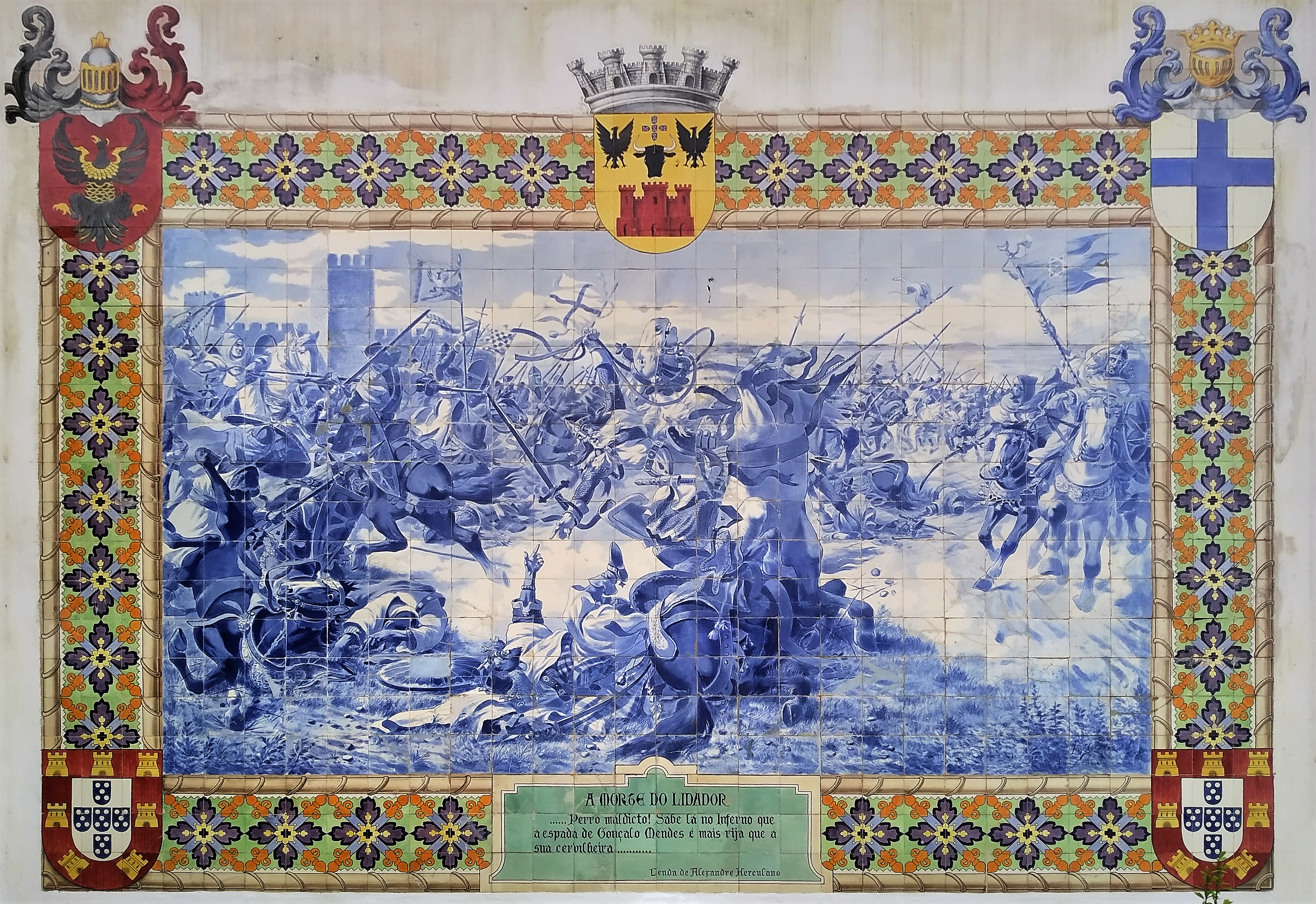
The death of Gonçalo Mendes da Maia at Beja.

Alarmed by the attacks on Badajoz, the Almohads mounted their second major incursion into Portugal in 1170 and recaptured Juromenha. They also attacked Beja and short combat was struck by the city walls in April, during which Gonçalo Mendes da Maia was killed, but in July the Muslims were forced to lift the siege.

In 1171, the Caliph Abu Yaqub Yusuf personally led a large army in the third major Almohad campaign against Portugal and Santarém was besieged, but the Muslims retreated as soon as they received the information that King Ferdinand II of León was fast approaching with an army to aid King Afonso, who was leading the city's defence. After the great Almohad attack on Santarém, the master of the Templars in Portugal Gualdim Pais promoted the renovation of Almourol Castle in 1171 in order to strengthen the defenses of Portugal. Still this year, Gerald the Fearless was driven from his castle at Lobon.

The Almohads are likely to have recaptured Beja in 1171. In August 1172, Gerald the Fearless launched a surprise night-time attack against the city. Its walls were poorly guarded as the Almohad governor Umar Ibn Sahnun had embezzled the pay of the sentries. The Portuguese managed to scale a tower and secure the city after a melee throughout its streets, but found they could not hold it and so they torched it, while its inhabitants scattered. Still in 1172, the Order of Santiago settled in Portugal on invitation of King Afonso, who granted them the castle of Monsanto (formerly in the ownership of the Templars), as well as the castle of Abrantes the following year.

Ambassadors were dispatched to Seville and a truce was then agreed-upon between Afonso Henriques and the Almohads a month later in October 1173.

=== Truce, 1173–1178 ===
Coat of arms of Lisbon.

After this truce was signed, Geraldo the Fearless left the service of king Afonso with 350 men and sought employment under the Almohads, who stationed him in Sous in north-Africa. After communications between Geraldes and king Afonso surfaced, he was transferred further inland to Draa and executed by the governor.

The relics of Saint Vicent of Zaragoza were brought to Lisbon during this truce in 1173. A number of residents of Lisbon sailed to Sagres and brought back the remains of the saint buried in a temple on the "Sacred Promontory". Upon their return, the place where the relics ought to be deposited caused an upheaval between the mozarabic residents of the parish of Santa Justa, the dean of the Lisbon Cathedral and the Augustinian monks of the Monastery of Saint Vicent. The chief-frontiersman of Estremadura Gonçalo Viegas de Lanhoso marched down from the castle with a corps of soldiers and only by his armed intervention could order be restored and an agreement reached between all parts, whereby the relics where deposited in the cathedral, though a piece was retained by the monks. A ship bearing the relics of Saint Vicent accompanied by crows henceforth became the charge of the coat of arms of Lisbon.

In 1176, the Portuguese king donated Coruche to the Order of Calatrava, as its castle guarded the road that linked Santarém to Évora.

=== The great Triana Raid, 1178 ===
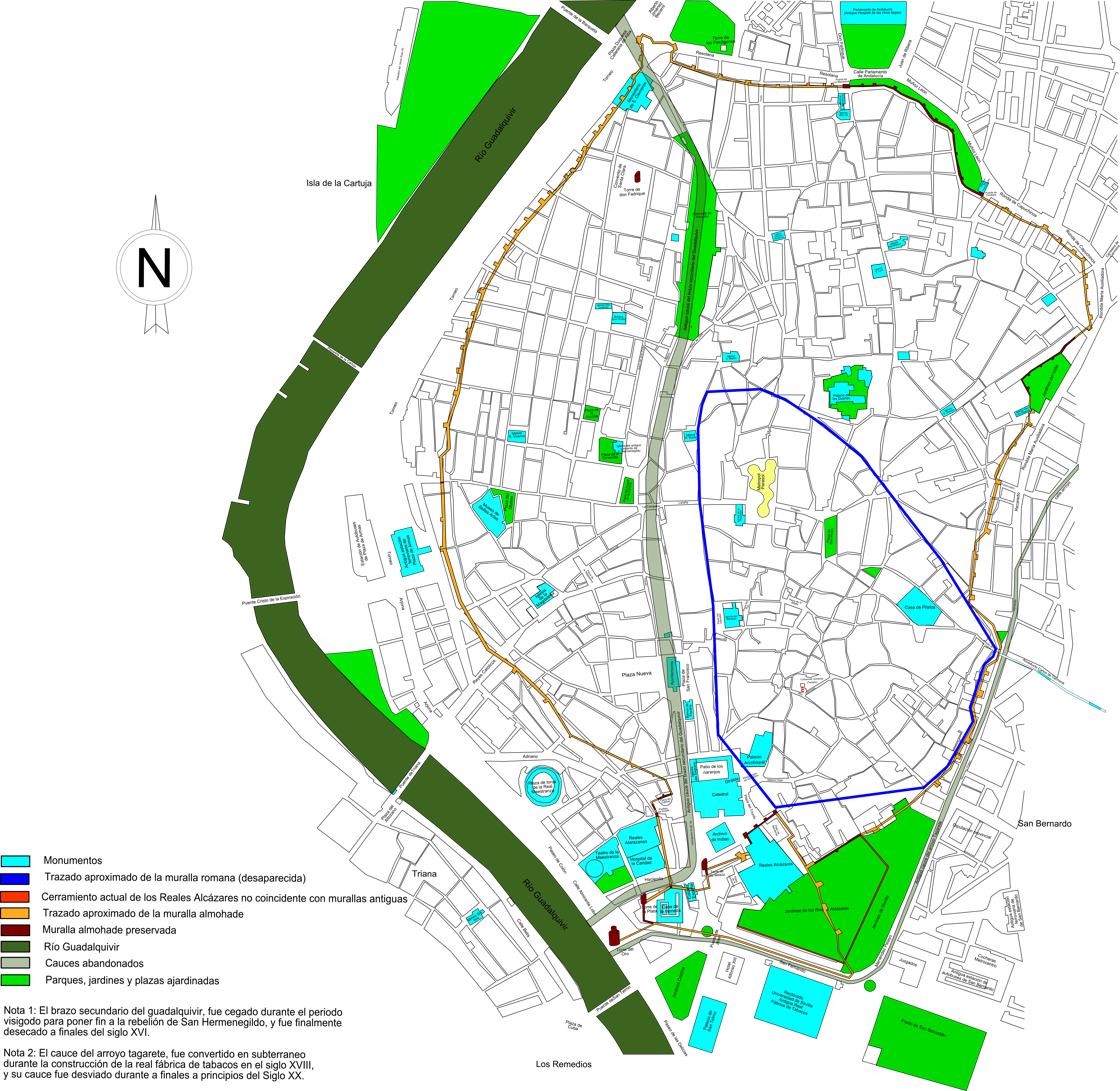
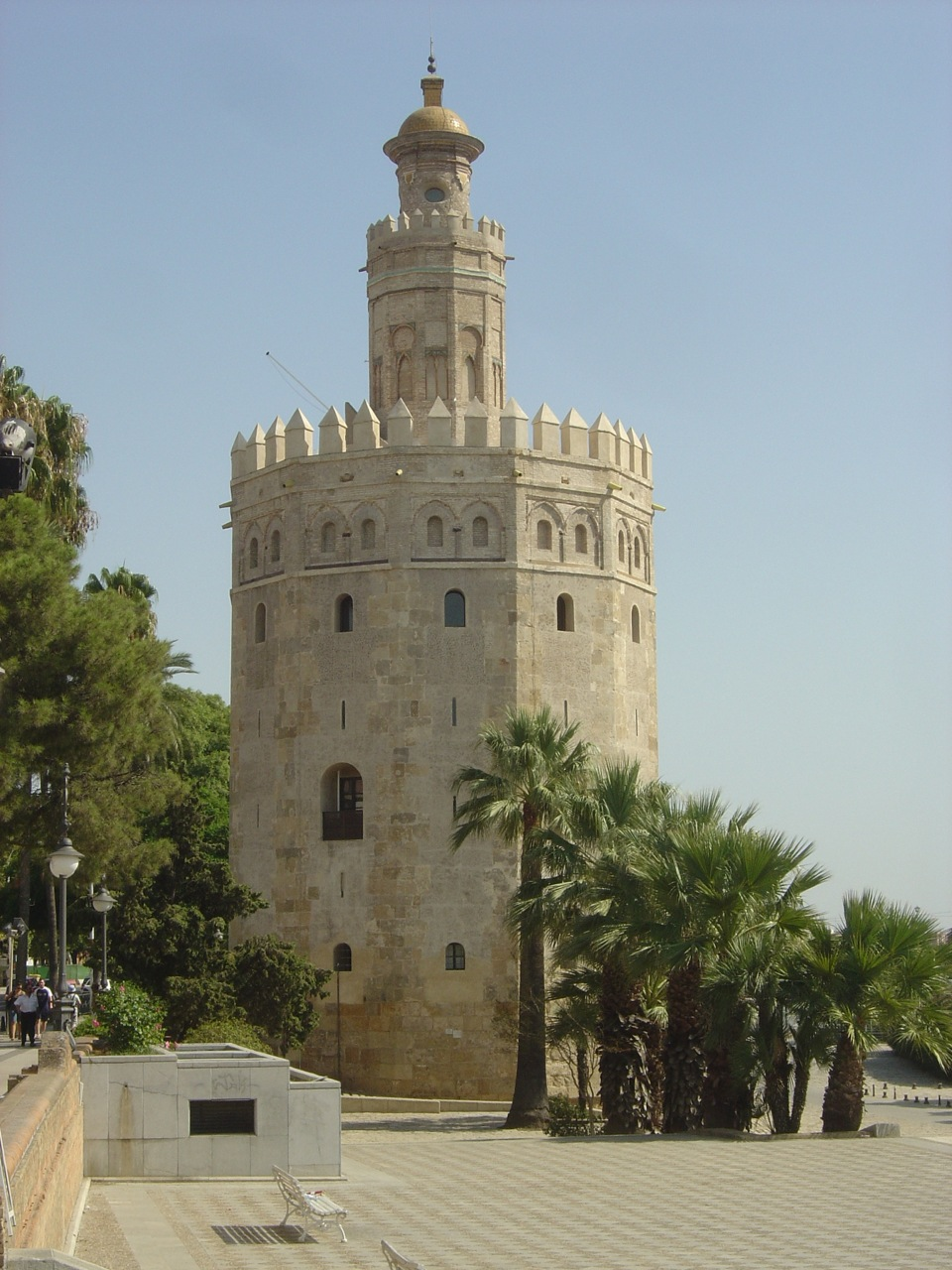
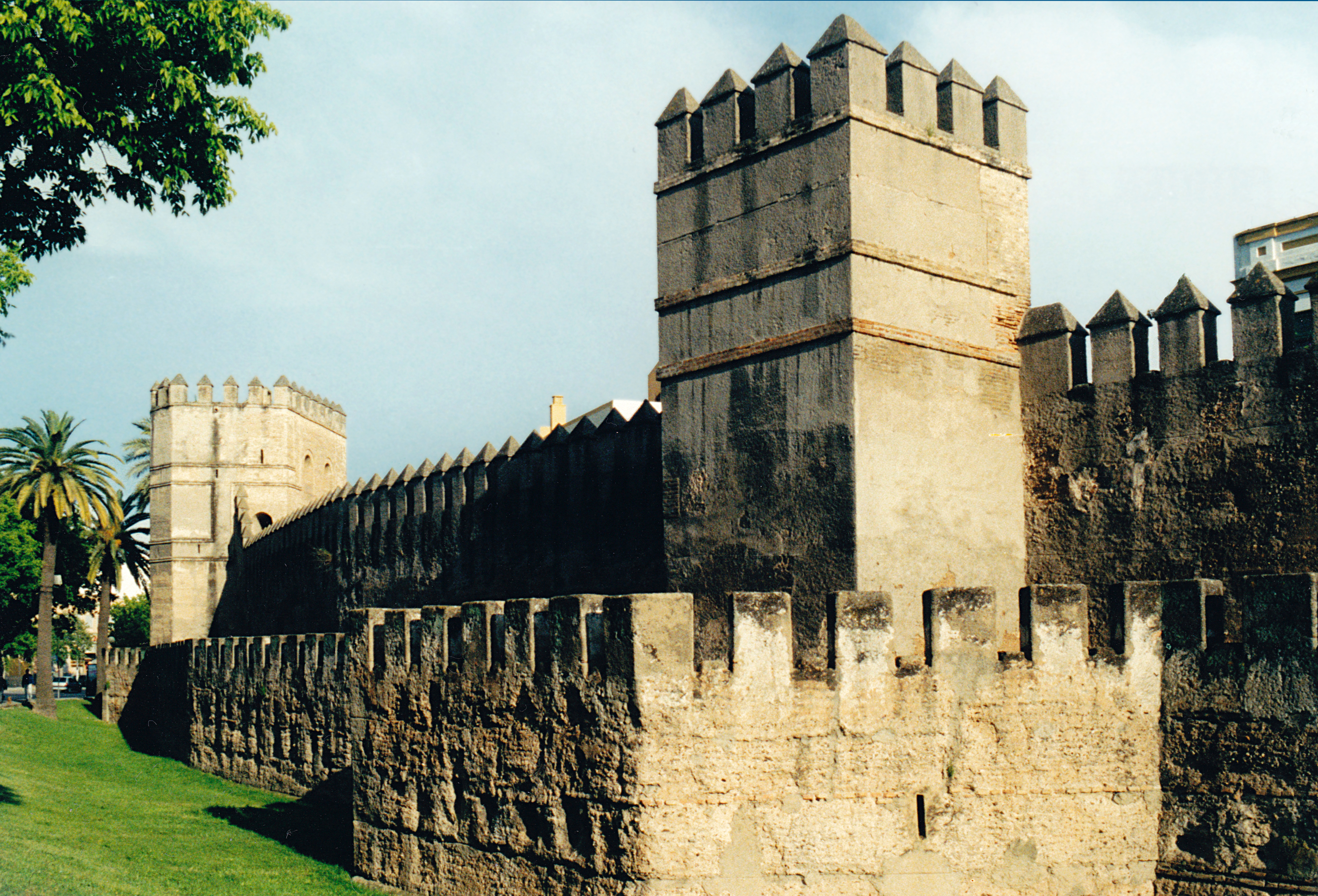
Plan of the walls of Seville (top-left). Torre del Oro, former Almohad watchtower of Seville (top right). Almohad walls of Seville (below).

Once the truce with the Muslims was over, prince Sancho led a great raid deep into Muslim territory. Troops gathered in Coimbra in the month of May and they included both infantry and cavalry drawn from the Order of Calatrava, the urban militias of the city as well as various other towns, such as Santarém, Lisbon and Évora, and the hosts of some of the main nobles in Portugal. It numbered about 2300 cavalry and 5000 footmen and was one of the largest forces mobilized by the Portuguese Crown so far.

They plundered the Almohad-controlled regions of Beja. Making a wide circuit through the modern Spanish Extremadura, the Portuguese crossed Sierra Morena and reached Seville in November, however their host was insufficient to assault the great city. They camped a few kilometers west of Seville and routed an Almohad army dispatched to intercept them in a large pitched-battle outside the city.

While the city lay on the left bank of the river, the Triana suburbs lay on the right bank and were connected by a bridge of barques close to the Torre del Oro. A tower overlooked the bridge. The suburbs were plundered and rich spoils captured.

While en route back to Coimbra, Niebla and Gibraleón were raided. A detachment of 1400 light horsemen and the garrison of Alcácer do Sal routed an Almohad contingent from Beja and Serpa commanded by the qaids Ibn Wazir and Ibn Timsalit, both of whom were killed in action. The great Triana Raid was one of the most daring military operations conducted in the history of Portugal and allowed the prince Sancho to affirm himself as a worthy commander and heir to the throne.

=== Almohad attacks 1179–1184 ===
The reprisals for Sanchos daring "Triana Raid" as it came to be known were quick to follow. A Muslim fleet raided the suburbs of Lisbon in 1179. Later that year, the Almohads invaded Portugal for the fourth time in a major attack against Abrantes, whose castle they were unable to take.

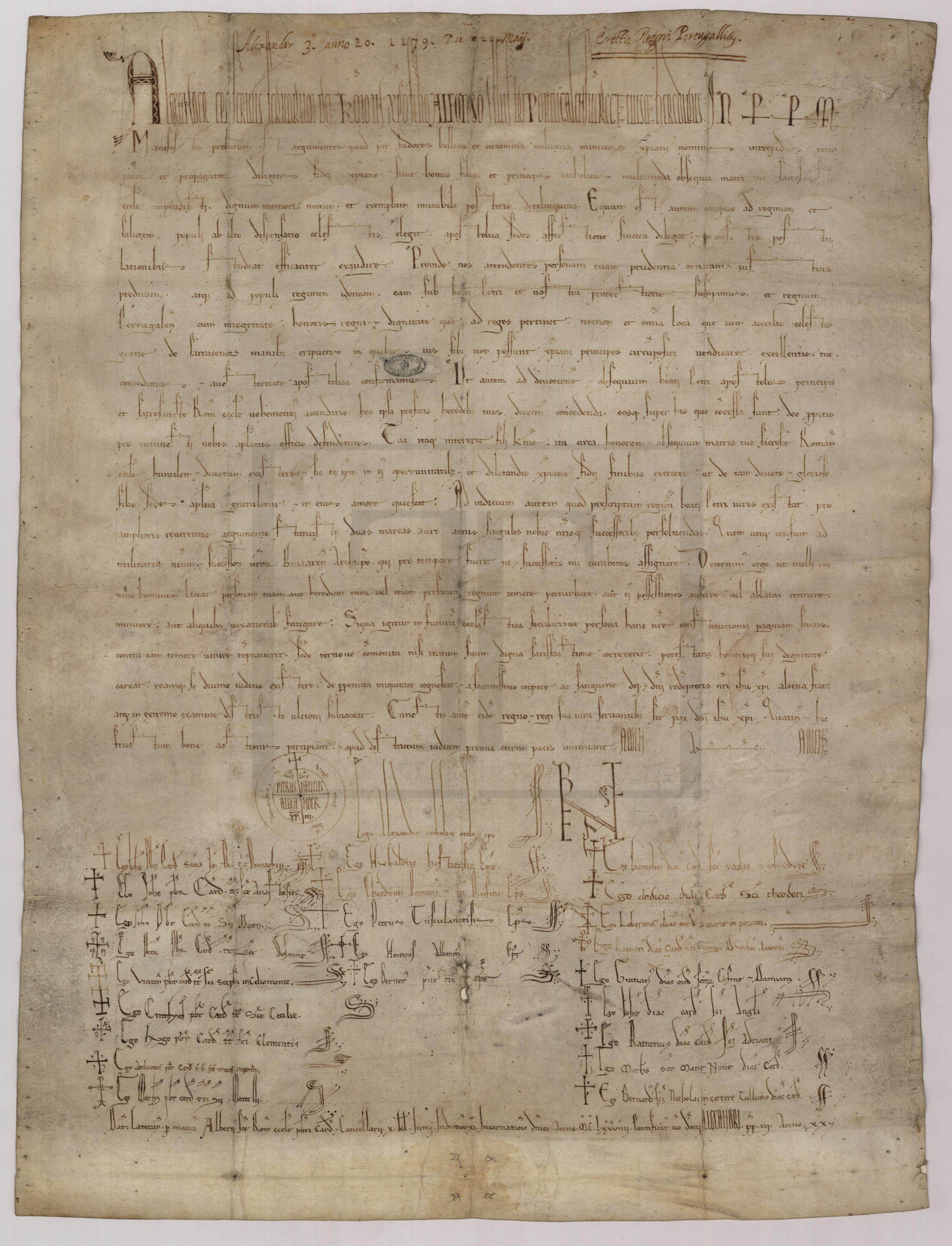
The Papal decree Manifestis Probatum.

A major landmark in Portuguese history was achieved in 1179 as by the Papal decree Manifestis Probatum, Portugal was acknowledged as an independent kingdom by the Vatican, largely as a result of king Afonsos efforts against the Muslims.

In 1180 the Almohads mounted their fifth major attack against Portugal. A fleet of galleys departed from Seville to raid the Portuguese coast and under these circumstances the Battle of Cape Espichel was fought on 15 July, in which the first admiral of Portugal Dom Fuas Roupinho defeated the Muslim fleet. He then proceeded for Ceuta and captured the ships on its harbour. In late 1180 an Almohad army departed from Seville under the leadership of Mohammed Ibn Yusuf Ibn Wammudin, who besieged Évora, while a detachment destroyed Coruche and carried its residents and defenders to captivity. While the siege of Évora was ongoing, a Portuguese fleet of 21 galleys commanded by Fuas Roupinho was defeated by a fleet of 51 Muslim galleys. At Évora however, the Almohads were forced to lift the siege and return to Seville.

In 1182/83 a new Portuguese expedition formed by local militias from Lisbon and Santarém sacked the Ajarafe, the land of villages and olive orchards to the west of Seville. They would take numerous captives.

The Almohad Caliph Abu Yaqub Yusuf then crossed the Strait of Gibraltar in 1184 and moving through Seville and Badajoz invaded Portugal at the head of a large army with African and Andalusian contingents, in the sixth major offensive against Portugal. He besieged Santarém, then defended by Afonso Henriques, while Almohad detachments spread out through Estremadura and plundered the region. The Muslims breached through the outer walls and forced the garrison to seek refuge within the high citadel, the last line of defence. Prince Sancho managed to reinforce the city, and conducted a successful sally against the Almohads. Once news of the siege spread, king Ferdinand II of Leon gathered an army and marched out to aid the Portuguese. The Almohads abandoned the siege in disarray shortly afterwards, while the Caliph appears to have been wounded during the action and died later on the road.

Shortly after the siege of Santarém, Lisbon was attacked by an Almohad fleet, that included a large dromon outfitted with a siege tower. However the ship was sunk in a daring sabotage operation during the night, and after plundering the outskirts of Lisbon the following morning, the Almohads withdrew.

=== Truce, 1184–1189 ===
Flag during the reign of Sancho I.

After the death of the Caliph Abu Yaqub Yusuf, prince Sancho negotiated a truce with his son and successor, Abu Yusuf Yaqub.

On December 6, 1185, king Afonso Henriques passed away and his heir succeeded him on the throne as Sancho I. His first four years were peaceful. Sancho was faced with the problem of large stretches of half-abandoned territory, ruined settlements and untilled fields due to war. He began by taking the opportunity to focus on organizing the administration of his kingdom, and granted charters regulating the laws and privileges of several Portuguese towns such as Gouveia and Covilhã in 1186, Viseu and Brangança in 1187 and Folgosinho and Valhelhas in 1188. A new castle was built on the Galician border at Contrasta, nowadays known as Valença. He donated Alcanede Castle to the Order of Calatrava in 1187.

=== The capture of Silves, 1189 ===
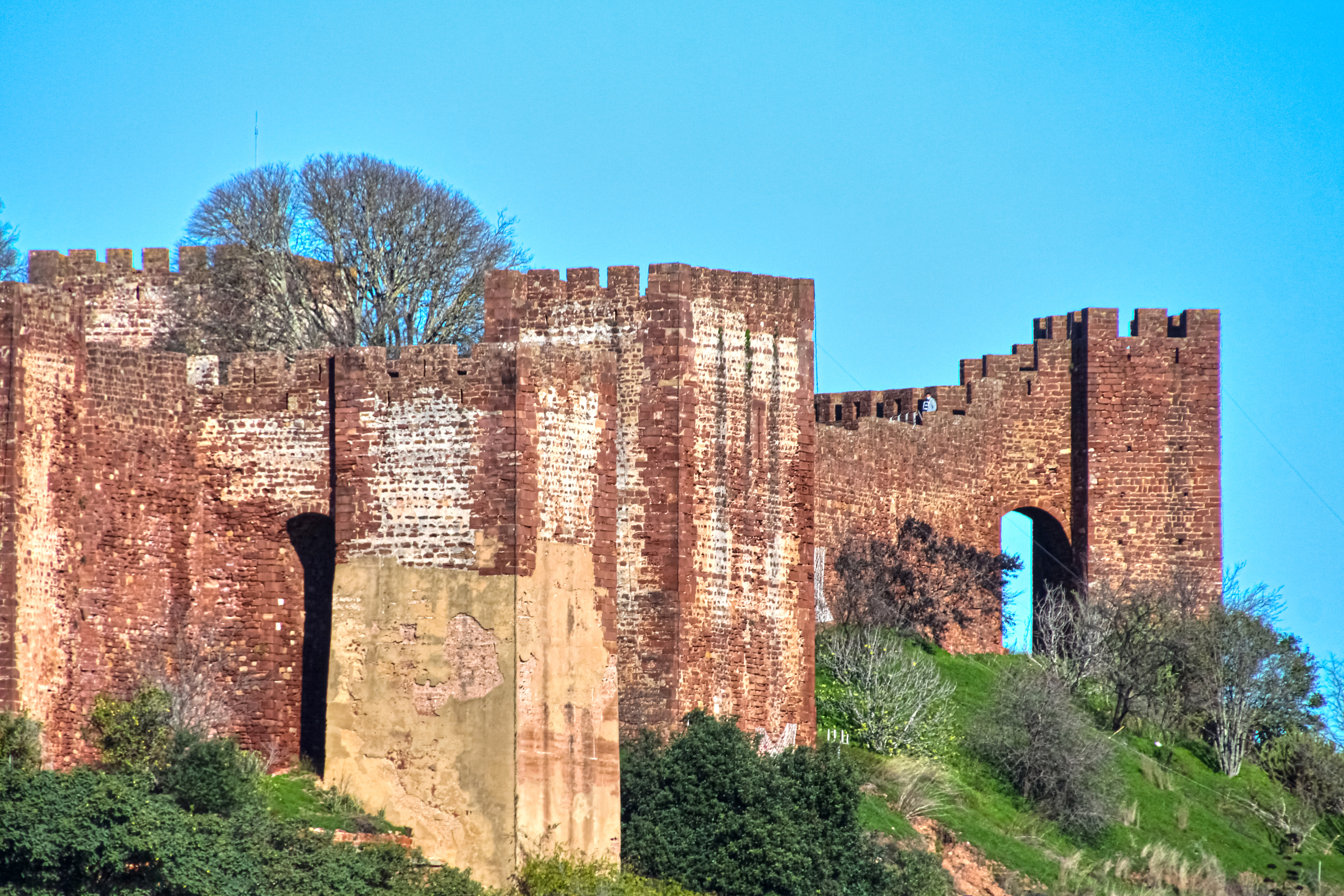
Walls and detached towers of the citadel of Silves.

When Jerusalem was conquered by Saladin in October 1187, Pope Gregory VIII called for the Third Crusade. Sancho realized that a new wave of crusader fleets would soon pass by the Portuguese coasts on their way to Palestine. In 1189 ships from Denmark and Frisia called at Lisbon, and in June they attacked the castle of Alvor in Algarve. They were accompanied by Portuguese galleys as far as Gibraltar.

A new crusader fleet called at Lisbon in 3 or 4 July and on this occasion king Sancho obtained their support for a planned attack against the major city of Silves, the most important one in the Gharb al-Andalus.

On July 20, 1189, the Portuguese host set up camp close to Silves just as the crusader fleet arrived by sea and sailed up the River Arade. The city was first attacked the following day for about a month and a half it was subjected to a violent siege, in which siege engines were used. The inhabitants surrendered, together with the surrounding castles at Lagos, Alvor, Portimão, Monchique, Santo Estêvão, Carvoeiro, São Bartolomeu de Messines, Paderne e Sagres.

=== The great Almohad campaign of 1190 ===
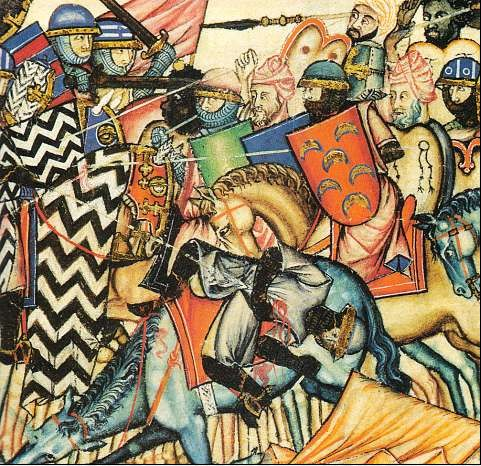
Battle of the Reconquista represented in the Cantigas de Santa Maria.

The Almohad Caliph Abu Yusuf Yacub al-Mansur had been planning a great campaign against Portugal at least since 1188, even before the conquest of Silves. The taking of this prestigious city by the Portuguese however caused outrage in the Maghreb and the Caliph ordered holy war to be preached. In April 1190 he crossed the Strait of Gibraltar at the head of a large army and besieged Silves in June. The Caliph however left his cousin Sayyid Yahya Ibn Umar at the command of operations and then left for Cordoba, where he met with ambassadors of King Alfonso VIII of Castile, who accepted a truce, leaving the Almohads free to focus on the planned attack against Portugal.

From Cordoba, the Almohad Caliph proceeded to invade Portuguese territory, entering through the Alentejo.

While Silves was under siege, Torres Novas was attacked and taken. Its defenders were granted freedom. The Caliph then personally besieged Tomar, a powerful Templar castle defended by Gualdim Pais, master of the Templars in Portugal. The Caliphs objective however was the important city and stronghold of Santarém.

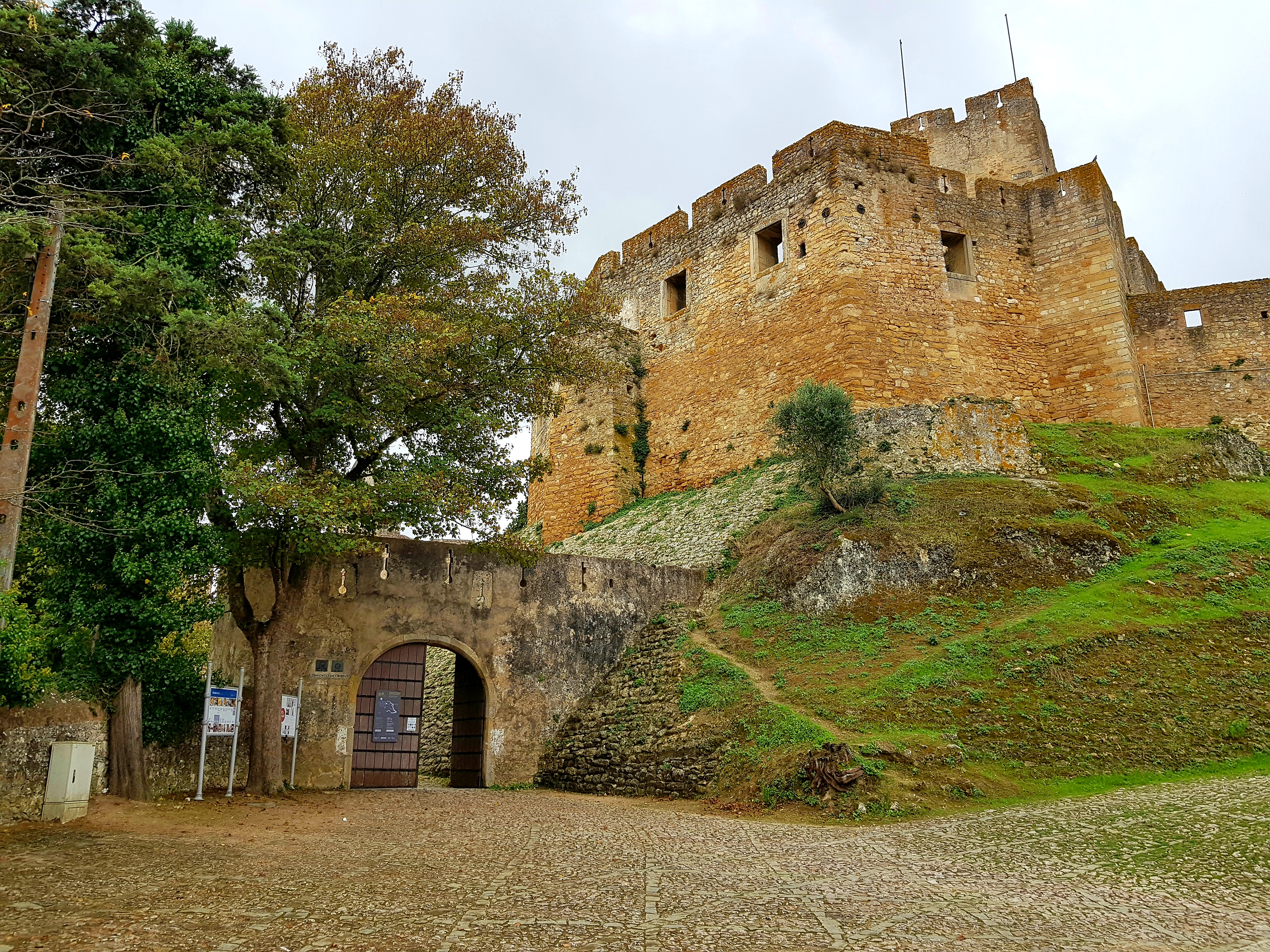
Citadel of Tomar.

By chance, at this time a number of crusader ships from northern Europe on their way to the Holy Land called at Silves and Lisbon due to bad weather. King Sancho of Portugal was at Lisbon at the time and he managed to obtain the support of 500 crusaders to relieve Santarém, hence he turned down the Caliphs peace proposals, which involved relinquishing Silves. The king then departed to Santarém and settled in the city with his troops. Having met stiffer resistance than anticipated, the Caliph ordered the sieges on Santarém and Tomar to be lifted, and withdrew south. Ill by that point, he lifted the siege of Silves also and left for Seville to spend the winter with his army, thus putting an end to the seventh major Almohad attack against Portugal.

Serious riots between the crusaders and the Jewish and Muslim population of Lisbon then took place, which resulted in the imprisonment of about 700 crusaders. On July 24, the crusader fleet left Lisbon.

=== The great Almohad campaign of 1191 ===
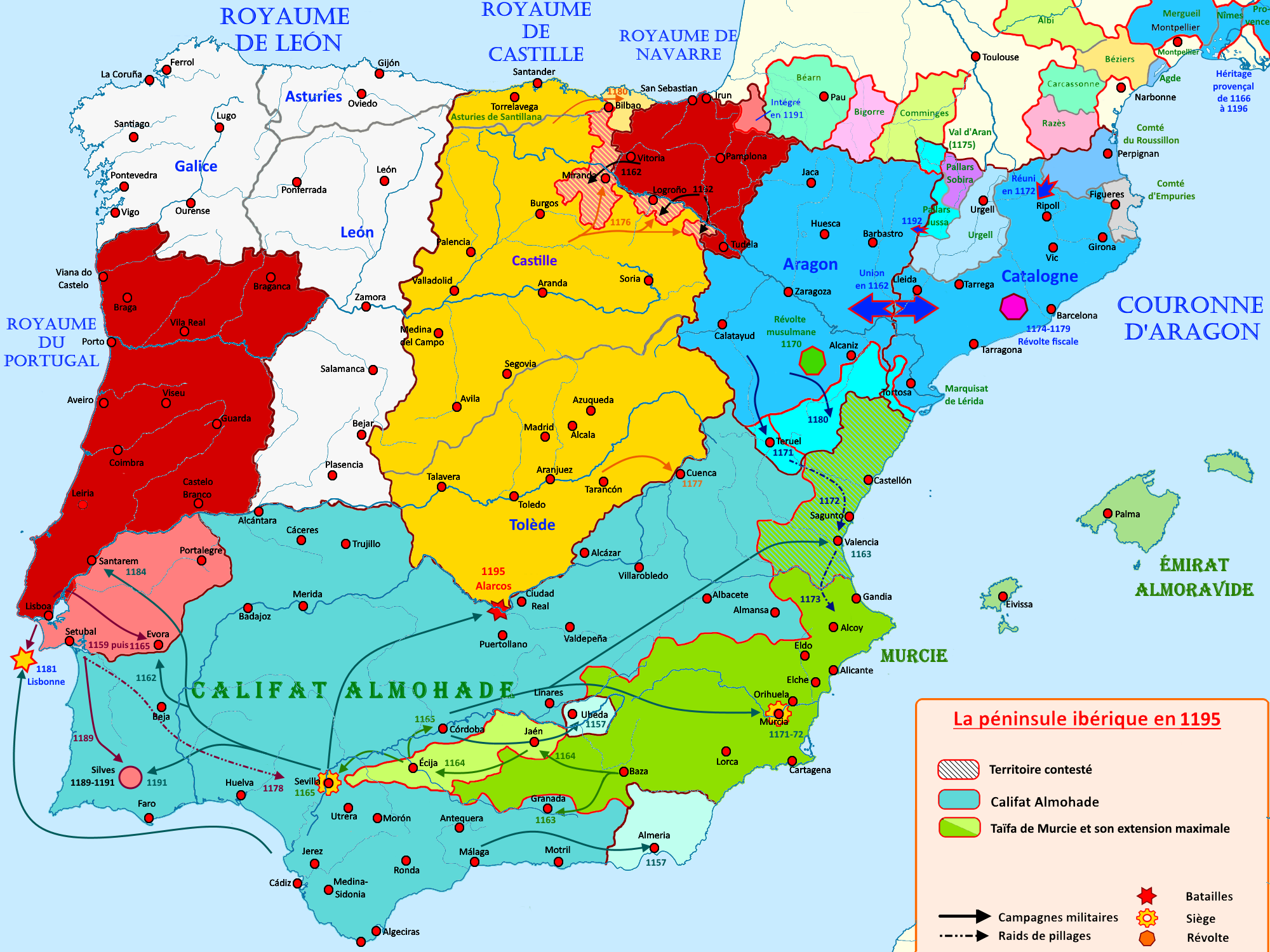
The Iberian Peninsula in 1195.

A new, larger and better prepared campaign against Portugal was launched by the Almohad Caliph in April 1191. The eight major Almohad campaign against Portugal began with an attack against Alcácer do Sal, which was sieged and though an initial assault failed, it was captured with the help of fourteen trebuchets. A Muslim garrison was then installed in the city, which was left under the command of the Andalusi Mohammed Ibn Sidray Ibn Wazir. Certain taxes from Ceuta and Seville were set aside to cover the upkeep of this castle and its garrison.

After Alcácer do Sal, Palmela, Coina and Almada were then taken. The Castle of Leiria was razed and the district of Coimbra was invaded.

In the Algarve, the castle of Alvor was taken by the Almohads. A new siege was set upon Silves and this time the Caliph possessed four times more siege weapons than the defenders. The walled city was breached and the defenders withdrew to the high citadel. The Portuguese surrendered on July 25, being allowed to leave with their lives only and the campaign was brought to a close.

A truce was signed between the Almohads and Portugal and the Caliph withdrew to Morocco. All Portuguese conquest south of the Tagus were thus lost, with the exception of the city of Évora, which resisted as an isolated enclave in Christian hands, surrounded by Muslim territory.

== Consolidation, 1191–1217 ==
Hospitaller cross.

After the loss of almost all territory south of the Tagus, Sancho abandoned the title "king of the Algarve".

In order to secure the territory still in Portuguese control against future Muslim incursions, for the following four years king Sancho followed a policy of consolidation and fortification of the frontier now set at the Tagus once more, largely supported by the military Orders. These were mainly the Templars, but also the knights of Santiago, Calatrava and the Hospitallers, which not only defended the territory but developed agriculture as well. Monasteries of the military Orders were established on the most important towns on the right bank of the Tagus, and land or castles were granted on the condition that monasteries be founded there. Municipal institutions were also established. The colonies of foreigners settled in Estremadura were expanded.

The Templars were given lands in Santarém and Idanha. The knights of Santiago were given the castle of Santarém. In 1193, the castle and territory of Mafra was granted to the Order of Calatrava. In 1194 the king donated the lands of Guidintesta to the Hospitallers, who had been in Portugal for a few decades already, and in exchange the Order erected on it its first castle in Portugal: the Castle of Belver.

The string of castles and fortifications along the northern bank of the Tagus became known as the "Tagus Line" (Linha do Tejo in Portuguese). It included the Templar castles of Almourol, Castelo Branco, Pombal, Tomar, Zêzere, Idanha-a-Nova, the Santiago castles of Monsanto, Abrantes, Santarém, the Hospitaller castle of Belver, the castle of Torres Novas, the Castle of Alverca, the Castle of Povos, and Lisbon.

=== The Battle of Alarcos, 1195 ===
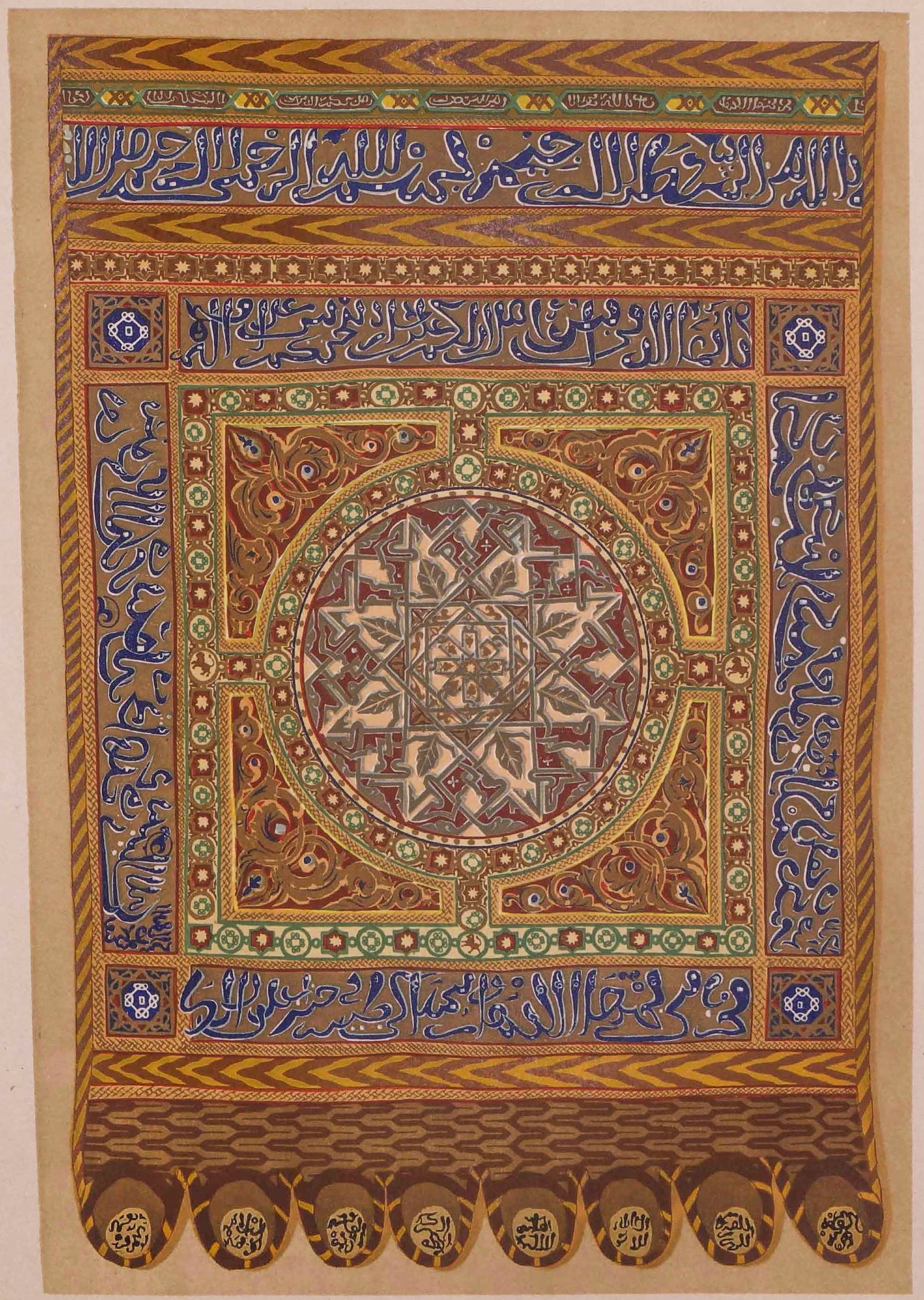
Almohad standard captured in 1212.

At this time, the Almohad caliph fell ill and affairs of state kept him busy in Morocco. King Alfonso VIII of Castile took the opportunity to invade the Andalus and he reached far as Algeciras, while the Archbishop of Toledo crossed the Guadalquivir and led an army to the heart of Andalusia, which was devastated. To face the Castilian threat, the Almohad caliph ordered the preaching of holy war and once again crossed the Strait of Gibraltar at the head of a large army. He first marched to Seville, then to Cordova, then crossed the Sierra Morena and descended on the plains to the north.

Alfonso VIII appealed to neighboring kings for a great Iberian coalition, but the monarchs of León, Navarre either could not reach the battlefield on time or they abstained or Alfonso would not wait for them. King Sancho sent a contingent of troops to aid Castile, led by the former alcaide of Silves Rodrigo Sanches and the master of Calatrava in Portugal Gonçalo Viegas de Lanhoso, and only they linked up with the Castilian army. The Christian and Muslims sighted each other by the town of Alarcos.

The Luso-Castilian army was severely routed at the Battle of Alarcos and king Alfonso VIII was nearly captured, while both Rodrigo Sanches and Gonçalo Viegas perished in battle, along with numerous knights. The Almohads also suffered considerable losses and withdrew to Sevile, albeit loaded with spoils. The king of Castile then signed a truce with the Almohads.

=== Consolidation, 1195-1212 ===
The defeat at Alarcos had considerable repercussions as it sharpened the divisions between Portugal, Castile, León, Navarre and Aragon and they were joined in war in 1196. Threatened by Castile, Portugal and Aragon, king Alfonso IX of León struck an alliance with the Almohads, but this caused him to be excommunicated by the Pope. Hostilities would continue until 1200.

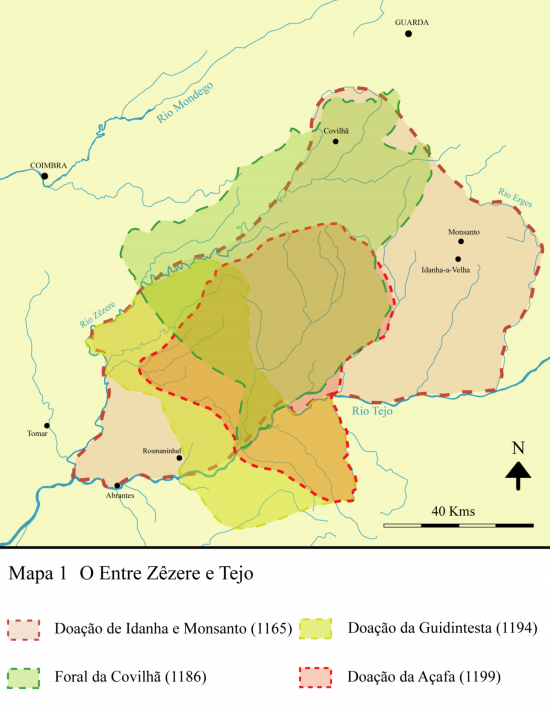
The region of Castelo Branco with the successive land-grants: To the Templars by Afonso Henriques in 1165, to the town of Covilhã by Sancho in 1186, to the Hospitallers in 1193, and to the Templars in 1199.

The city of Guarda was founded in 1199, in a location that was both difficult to reach and allowed as many as twenty leagues of the surrounding territory to be watched. That same year, king Sancho also granted to the Templars the lands of Açafa, where the city of Castelo Branco would be established.

It seems that the Almohads did not resettle the territory between Alcácer do Sal and the Tagus after devastating it, and King Sancho managed to recover some of the lands that had been lost in 1191. In 1200 the Order of Calatrava founded Benavente, on the south bank of the Tagus. The following year, the castles of Palmela and Sesimbra were reoccupied. Extreme famine swept across Western Europe in 1202, Portugal included, and the advance southwards was interrupted once again, in order to focus on agriculture and relief efforts. In 1203, Bishop Soeiro Viegas of Lisbon founded Alhandra on the north bank of the Tagus. The establishment of towns along the north bank of the lower Tagus and the Templars on the upper Tagus facilitated the securing of the lands across the river to the south. Still in 1203, Sancho built the castle of Montemor-o-Novo south of the Tagus, thus linking Évora to the mainland Portuguese territory. The king founded Idanha-a-Nova in 1205 or 1206 and handed it over to the Templars.

D. Sancho I sacked Elvas on 25 July 1208.

On 26 March 1211, King Sancho I died and was succeeded by Afonso II. In the year he took the throne, the king negotiated a truce with the Almohads. In that same year, the king donated the lands of Avis to the Order of Calatrava, on the condition that they build a castle there, and it was completed in 1214. This town became the headquarters of the Order in Portugal. Still in 1211, civil-war broke out in Portugal between the king and his sisters Mafalda, Teresa and Sancha. The king of León got involved in this conflict, taking the side of the princesses as a pretext to invade Portugal.

=== The Battle of Las Navas de Tolosa, 1212 ===
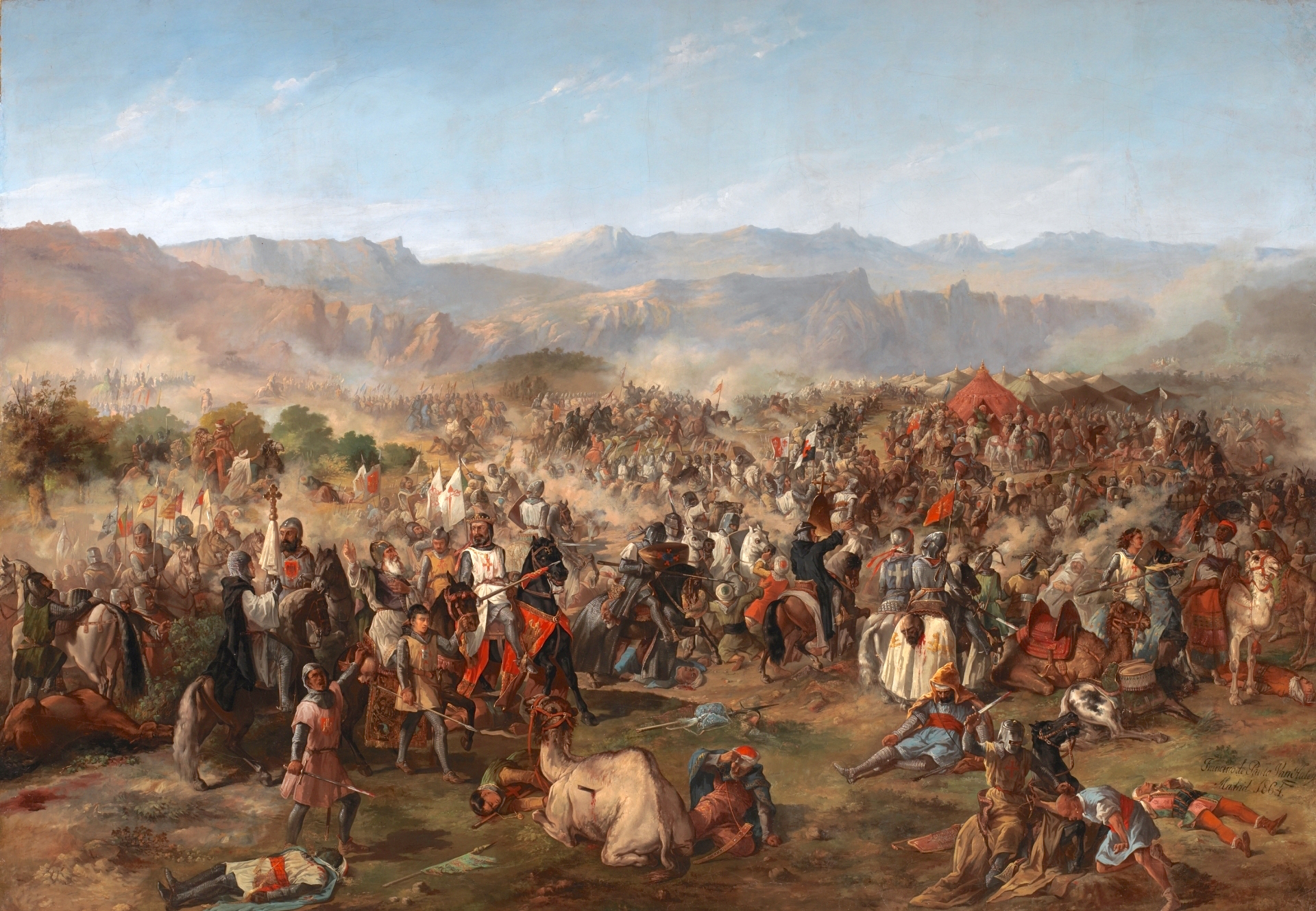
The Battle of Navas de Tolosa

After the Battle of Alarcos, Castile had been forced to sign a truce with the Almohads, which remained in force until 1210. After they had expired, Alfonso began to reassert his military initiative along the frontier, but the ensuing Almohad response led to the loss of the castle of Salvatierra to the Muslims in 1211. News of the loss spread throughout Christendom and in late 1211 Alfonso began organizing a major campaign intended to seek a major pitched battle with the Almohad Caliph. Pope Innocent III backed the preparations and preached a crusade. King Alfonso VIII launched a new war against the Almohads and Caliph Muhammad al-Nasir once again gathered a large army and crossed into Iberia. This time, however, the king of Castile was supported by the hosts of king Peter II of Aragon, king Sancho VII of Navarre in person, as well as the various religious orders and volunteers throughout Europe.

Afonso II was unable to personally assist the allied kings, but despite being involved in war with his sisters and León, the Portuguese king still dispatched a considerable number of troops to help fight the Almohads. The Portuguese host was composed mainly of town militias but also included Templar squadrons as well as other volunteers who joined the expedition, led by the master of the Templars in Portugal, Gomes Ramires. The final gathering was done in Toledo in May 1212 and Christian forces may have numbered about 4,000 knights and 8,000 footsoldiers total.

The Christians headed south mid-June and captured several important castles along the way such as Malagon, Calatrava, Alarcos, Caracuel, Benavente and Pedrabuena. On July 12 they reached Sierra Morena, the mountain passes of which were blocked by the Almohads, who had set up camp on the opposite side. Yet the Iberians found an alternative path down the mountain, forced a pitched battle and on 16 July 1212 routed the Almohads largely through a vigorous heavy cavalry charge.

The Portuguese distinguished themselves in the battle of Navas de Tolosa, particularly the commoners of the town militias. The Castilian Rodrigo de Toledo commented that "a number of warriors from the parts of Portugal, a copious multitude of foot-soldiers of wonderful agility, easily sustained the labours of the expedition and attacked with an audacious onset", while Lucas of Tuy wrote that "they rushed into combat as if for a feast."

== The definitive conquest of Alentejo, 1217–1238 ==
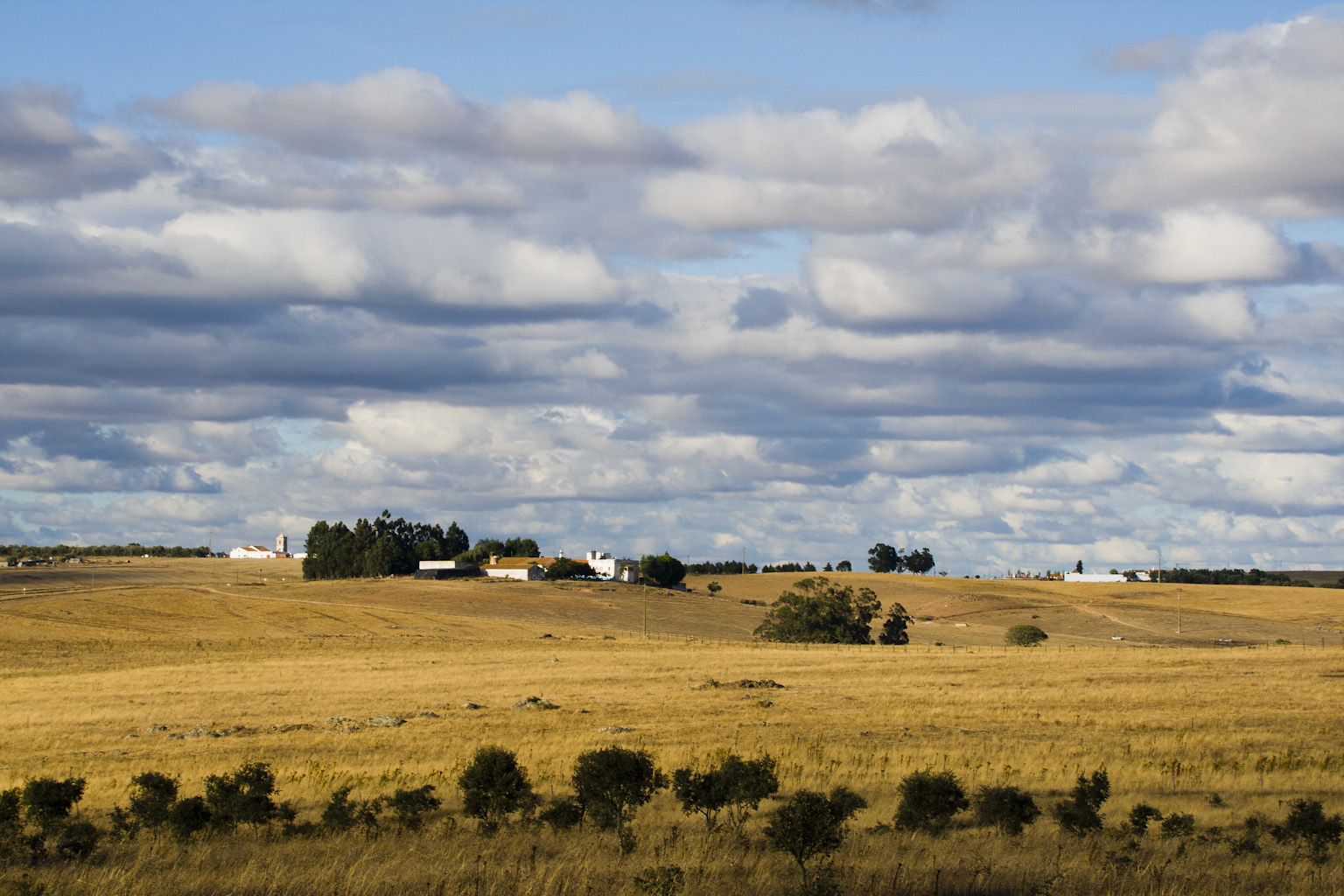
Common landscape of the Alentejo.

After the battle of Navas de Tolosa, Portuguese bishops and other authorities sought to take advantage of Almohad weakness to reconquer the Alentejo, south of the Tagus river. Muslim pirates and privateers remained active along the coast of Portugal, preying on Portuguese navigation and coastal communities, while on land border raids continued. The knights of Santiago at Palmela and other garrisons established along the frontier between the Tagus and the Sado had recurring clashes with the Muslims of Alcácer do Sal in particular.

Alcácer do Sal was the main Muslim naval base on the western coast of the peninsula and the main threat to Lisbon ever since the Almohads had retaken the city in 1191. Its governor in 1217 was ʿAbdallāh ibn Muḥammad ibn Sidray ibn ʿAbd al-Wahhāb Wazīr al-Qaysī, who had succeeded his father in 1212. He launched regular raids by land and sea against Portugal. He was able to remit an annual tribute of 100 Christian captives to the Almohad caliph in Morocco.

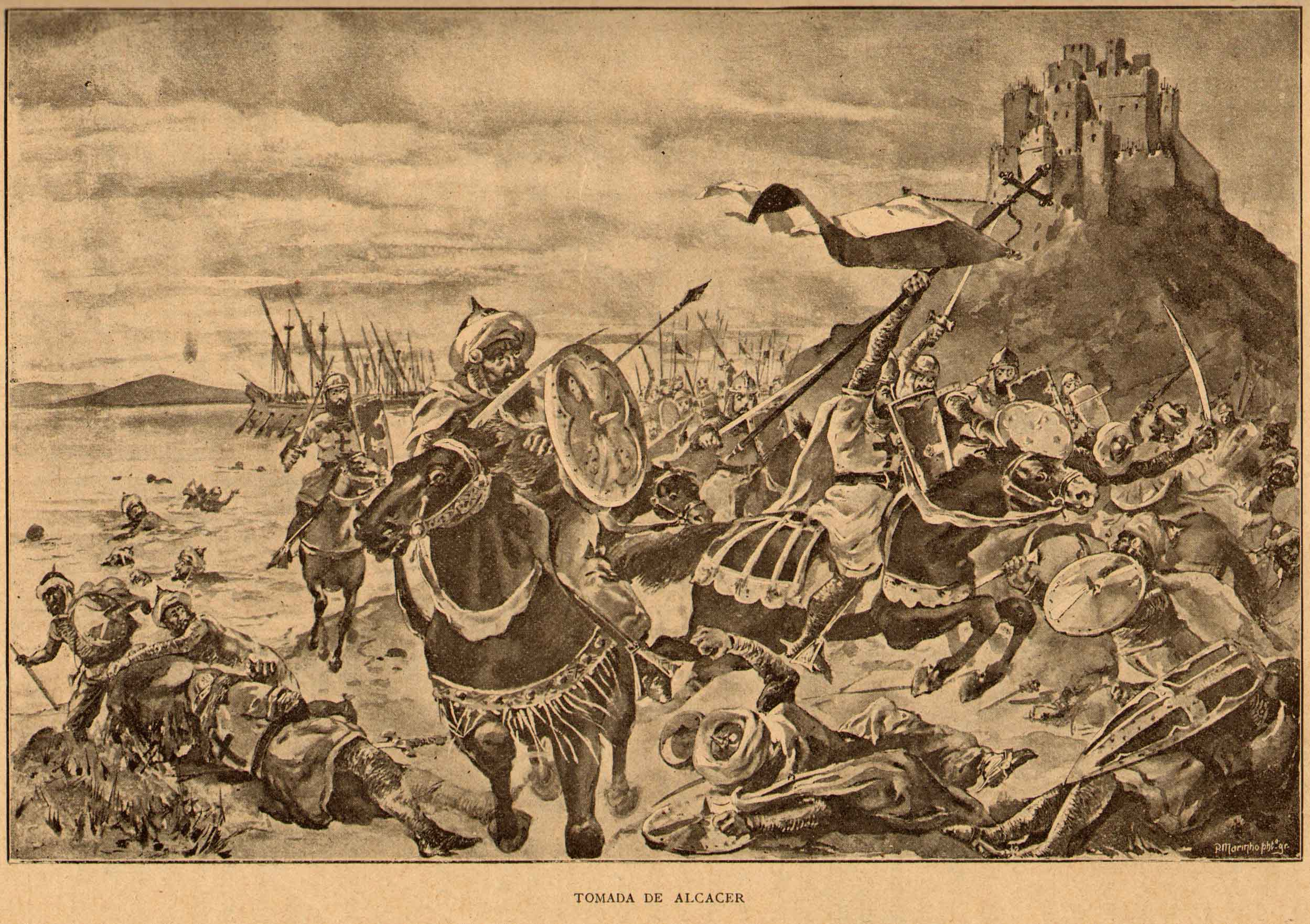
The taking of Alcácer do Sal, by Roque Gameiro.

The initiative to conquer Alcácer do Sal came from the Bishop of Lisbon D. Soeiro Viegas, who called for a crusade throughout the kingdom, invested his own financial resources in it and obtained the collaboration of both the bishop of Évora, the abbot of Alcobaça, the military Orders and Flemish, Saxon, and Frisian crusaders whose fleet had arrived at Lisbon, on the way to Palestine. The bulk of the army was made up of infantry from the town militias, but would also included around 300 knights, as well as Templar squadrons, led by Master Dom Pedro Alvites, knights of Santiago led by Martim Pais Barregão and hospitallers led by Prior Dom Gonçalves de Cerveira.

The Christian host and fleet departed from Lisbon to Alcácer do Sal in the last days of June 1217. Alcácer do Sal was surrounded and attacked using mines, battering rams, trebuchets, and siege towers. As the Christian forces approached, the qaid of Alcácer do Sail, Abdallah Ibn Wazir, requested military aid from the Muslim garrisons in the region and on the morning of September 11 the Portuguese defeated an Almohad relief army from Jaen, Córdoba, Seville and Badajoz, at the Battle of Ribeira de Sítimos, while the crusaders remained behind to blockade Alcácer and guard their ships. Already very weakened by that point, the defenders of Alcácer do Sal surrendered in mid-October and were allowed to leave with their lives.

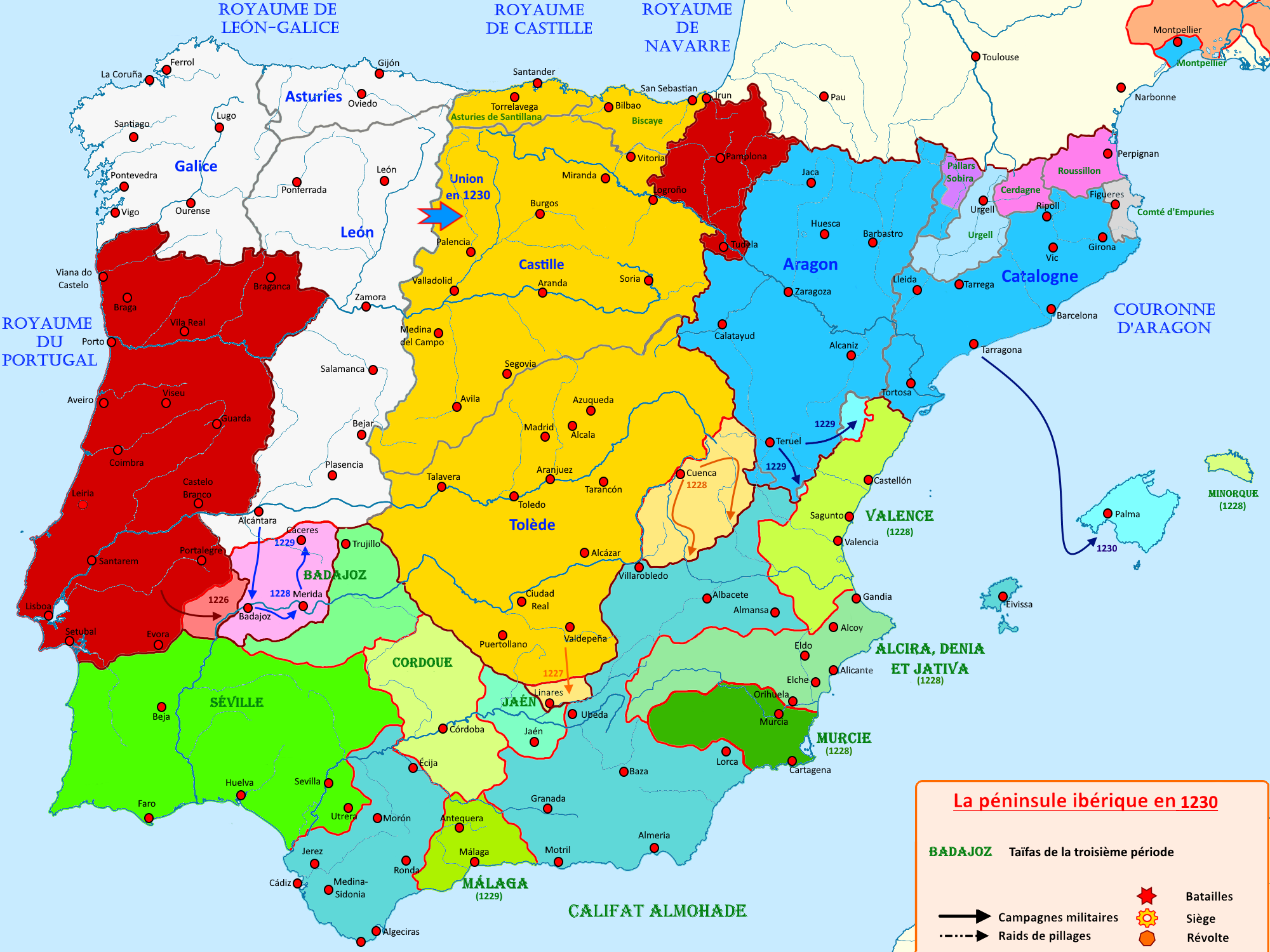
The Iberian Peninsula in 1230.

With the fall of Alcácer do Sal, most of the upper Alentejo fell to the hands of the Portuguese. Under the command of master Dom Fernão Anes, the knights of Calatrava then moved quickly to capture Veiros, Borba and Monforte in the vicinity of Elvas, while the kings host captured Vila Viçosa. The knights of Santiago on their part reconquered Santiago do Cacém.

=== Truce 1219-1225 ===
King Afonso II became embroiled in conflicts with the nobility, the clergy and the neighbouring kingdom of León, so in 1219 he signed a truce with the Muslims in order to focus on internal politics. He died in March 1223 and was succeeded on the throne by Sancho II.

=== Portuguese conquest of the lower Alentejo, 1225-1238 ===
Civil-war broke out between the Almohads in 1224 as that year the governor of Murcia Abdallah al-Adil proclaimed himself Caliph. He was able to take over most of the Andalus and seize Seville. Almohad chiefs in Marrakesh rallied to his cause and in September 1224 the ruling Caliph Abd al-Wahid was murdered in the city. The deposition and murder of al-Wahid was a major departure in Almohad history as there had been no major succession disputes since the time of Abd al-Mumin. Al-Adils coup fatally destabilized the Almohad regime and against a background of growing crisis of plague, famine, Christian advance in Iberia and Marinid revolt in Morocco, recovery would henceforth prove impossible.

With Almohad power weakened by civil conflict, the Portuguese, Castilians and Leonese began launching raids into the Andalus almost unchecked. The region of Seville was once again invaded by Portuguese knights in 1225. While the Almohad governor of Seville refused to meet the Portuguese in battle, the residents of Seville spontaneously armed themselves and took to the field, but they were massacred not far from the city walls.

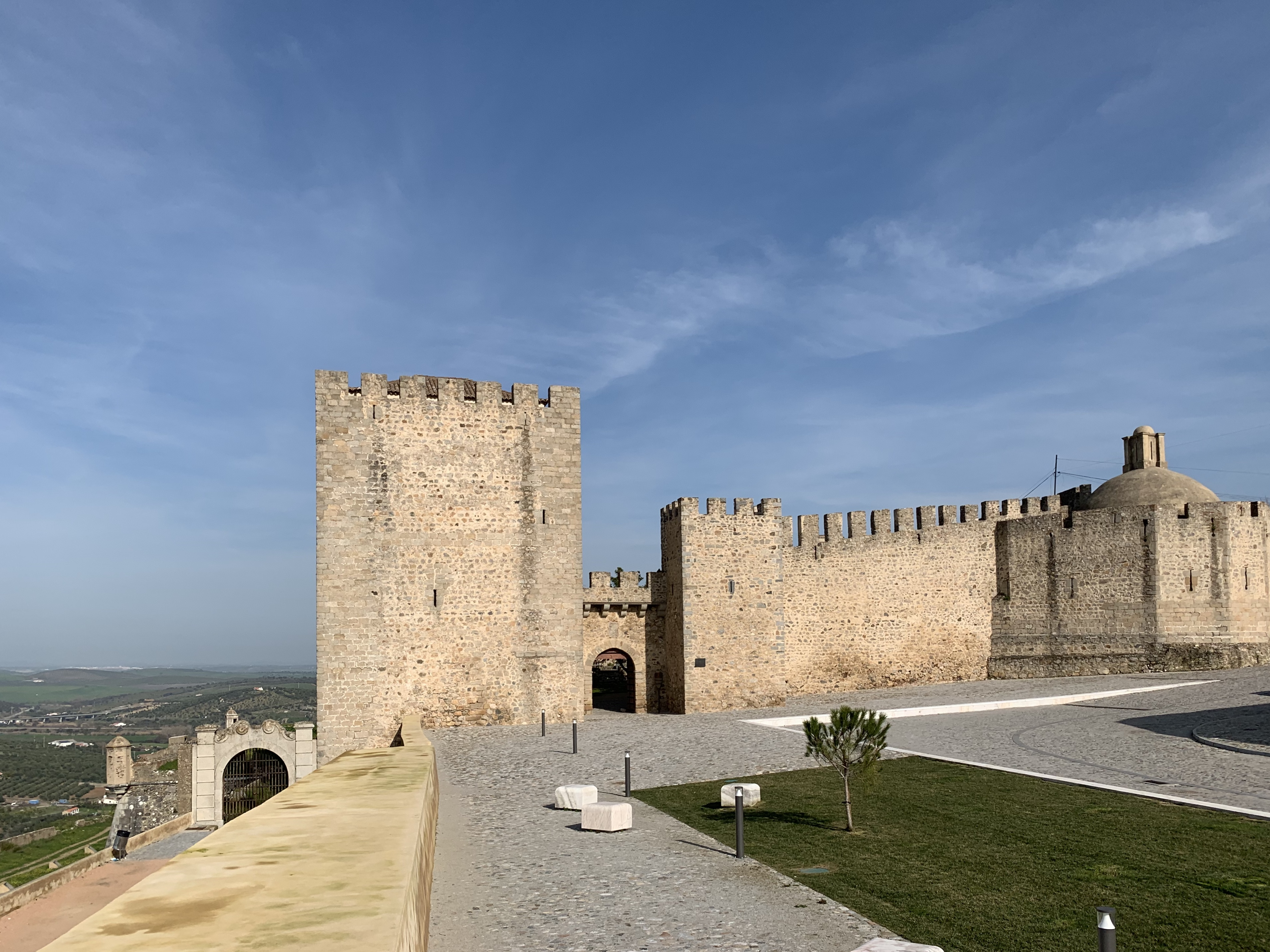
The castle of Elvas.

In the spring of 1226, king Sancho II sieged Elvas at the same time as the Leonese attacked Badajoz. The archbishop of Braga and the royal ensign Martim Anes commanded the royal host. The surrounding fields were pillaged and the king risked his life in the action, but when the Portuguese saw that the Leonese failed to conquer the powerful city of Badajoz and Autumn was approaching however, they withdrew.

New Portuguese and Leonese raids devastated the region of Seville in 1228. The lack of response to Christian incursions discredited the Almohads and precipitated the revolt of the Andalusi populations, bringing about a new period of taifas began. As the Almohad governors were deposed by local warlords throughout al-Andalus, in October of that year, Caliph Idris al-Ma'mun abandoned Seville and returned to Morocco with his last remaining troops when the Iberian Peninsula was already considered lost.

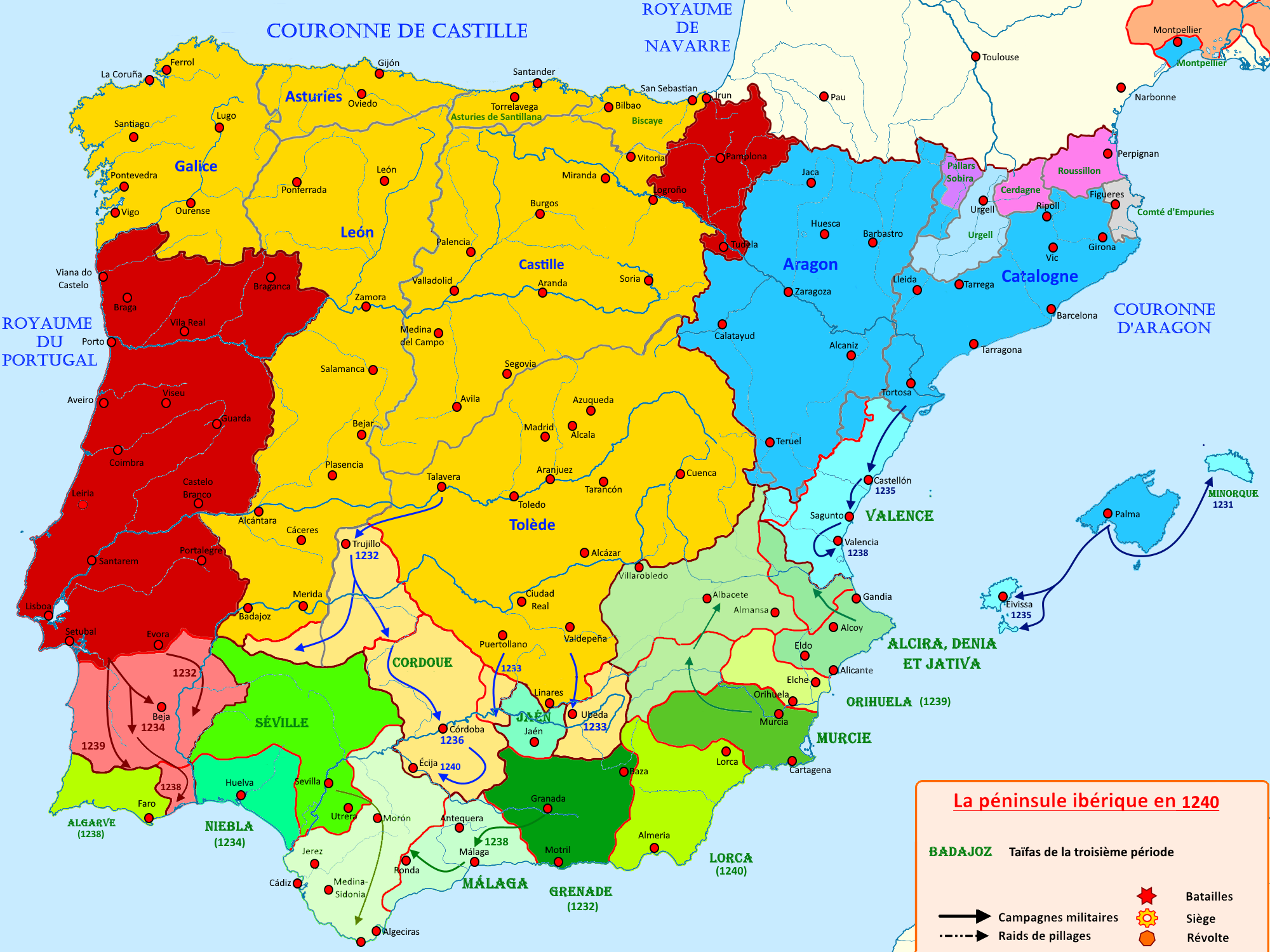
The Iberian peninsula in 1240.

Portuguese friar knights returning home the Leonese campaign against Mérida in 1230 found that Elvas and Juromenha had been abandoned by the Muslims, so they occupied them in the name of the King of Portugal on 1 March 1230, the same day that Mérida was taken by the Leonese. Later that same year, Sancho II installed garrisons in both cities. The king gathered his forces at Elvas at the end of that year in preparation for campaigns further south, on the left bank of the Guadiana. The towns of Moura and Serpa were captured in 1232 and granted to the Hospitallers. Still in 1232, the Hospitallers founded Crato and Castelo de Vide, the territory of which had been donated to them by the king. Beja was likely captured in this year.

Aljustrel was captured in 1234, and in March of the following year the king granted the town to the knights of Santiago. The conquest of Arronches, Mértola and Alfajar da Pena followed in 1238.

== The definitive conquest of Algarve, 1238–1249 ==
The cross of the Order of Santiago

In the same year that Mértola was captured, Portuguese forces proceeded into the territory of Algarve and captured Alcoutim, along with Ayamonte, east of the Guadiana River, taken by Sancho II with a fleet.

The mountain ranges of Algarve constituted a serious obstacle to the march of the Portuguese hosts to the south and southwest. The commander of the knights of Santiago in Portugal Paio Peres Correia managed to cross them in 1238 still with the support of Garcia Rodrigues, a knight who knew their pathways well due to his previous occupation as a merchant, which allowed the knights of Santiago to bypass the main Muslim castles that they guarded the mountain paths, marching by night and camping by day, hidden in the valleys.

The first castles to be taken were those of Alvor and Estômbar, in the region of Silves. From there, raids was launched into the rich fields around this important city. By agreement with the emir of the Algarve Musa ibn Mahommed ibn Nasser ibn Mahfuz ("Aben Mafom" in Portuguese) Paio Peres Correia exchanged them for the castle of Cacela Velha, much further east, close to Ayamonte

After a failed surprise attack on the castle of Paderne, the important town of Tavira was taken by the knights of Santiago. Located on one of the few roads that crossed the Algarve lengthwise and gave access to the Alentejo, the castle of Salir was then taken. Silves was taken by deception: a small detachment of knights was sent to attack the castle of Estômbar and false information was spread that Paio Peres Correia lead at head of this force. Once the emir had left with his troops in direction of Estômbar the walls were scaled and the city taken. Paderne was captured shortly afterwards, with its entire garrison being slaughtered. The minor mountain castles of Monchique, Montagudo, Marachique, Ourique and Messines are likely to have surrendered after Silves was taken.

=== Campaign of king Afonso III in Algarve, 1249 ===
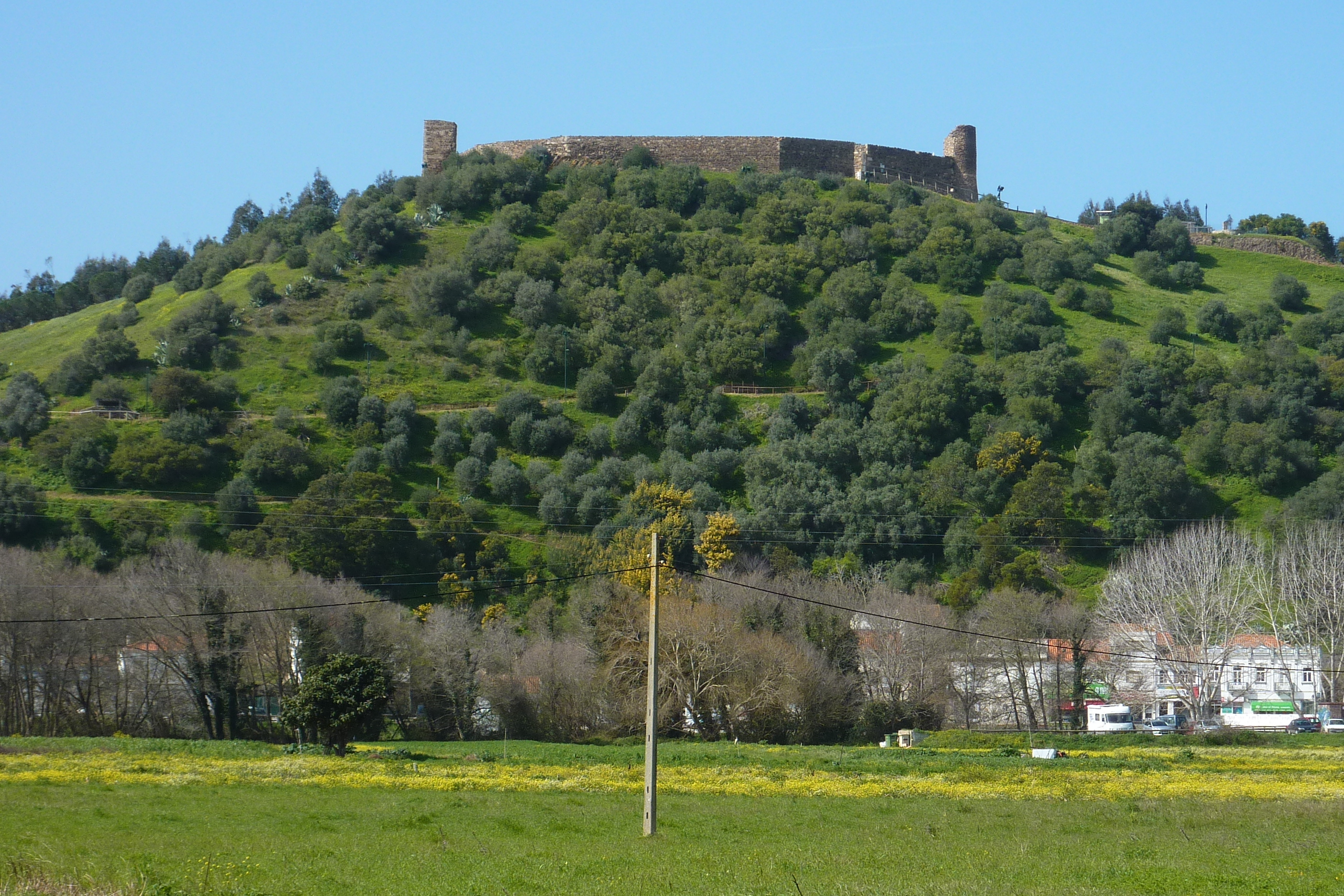
The Castle of Aljezur.

By 1249, only the settlements of Aljezur, Faro, Loulé, Porches and Albufeira still remained in Muslim hands. Their lords had submitted to the authority of the Merínids of Morocco and were difficult to take without the support of a fleet.

Once king Afonso III had emerged victorious from the civil war that pitted him against his brother, he prepared to capture the last Muslim cities in Algarve. The moment to do so was opportune, as in neighbouring Castile king Ferdinand III had recently captured Valencia, Cordoba and Seville. Afonso III crossed the mountains of Algarve in the first weeks of March through Almodôvar, at the head of his royal host. He was accompanied by his main supporters during the civil war, first among them Dom João de Aboim, but also the heads of the military Orders, such as the master of the Order of Calatrava in Portugal, Dom Lourenço Afonso, and the experienced grandmaster Paio Peres Correia at the head of the knights of Santiago.

The important port city of Faro was sieged first. Expecting reinforcements from North Africa, the qaid of Faro Alboambre mounted some resistance but once the Portuguese fleet sailed up the river and blocked the port, the city surrendered, thus avoiding pointless bloodshed and ensuring its inhabitants a favorable status under Portuguese authority.

The flag of Portugal during the reign of king Afonso III.

Once Faro was captured, Loulé surrendered after little resistance. Porches and Albufeira surrendered to the Dom Lourenço Afonso. Aljezur, the last town in the Algarve still in Muslim hands, was finally taken on one morning by grandmaster Paio Peres Correia.

== Aftermath ==
Upon completing the conquest of Algarve, king Afonso III adopted the title "King of Portugal and Algarve", created by king Sancho when he first conquered Silves, 60 years earlier.

As Ibn Mahfuz had declared himself a vassal of Castile, king Ferdinand III considered the Algarve to belong to him. This caused a diplomatic crisis and even war between Afonso and Ferdinand, who invaded the Algarve. Only when the Treaty of Badajoz was signed in 1267 did Ferdinand acknowledge the rights of Afonso over the territory and the border was established at the Guadiana River.

Official Portuguese participation in the Reconquista came to an end and so did the opportunity to gain territory and spoils, hence many knights and warriors crossed the border to find service under the kings of Leon and Castile as adventurers or mercenaries.

Land ownership by the military Orders in Portugal (and Spain).

The vast swaths of land captured in the south by the Knights of Santiago, the Templars, Hospitallers and Knights of Calatrava collectively made the military Orders easily the greatest territorial beneficiaries of the Portuguese Reconquest. For their service in the wars against the Muslims, the commoners were rewarded by king Afonso III with representation in the cortes, which in 1254 gathered for the first time not just nobility and clergy but commoners as well.

The end of the Reconquista in Iberia did not mean the end of hostilities with foreign Muslim powers. Berber pirates and Muslim privateers from north-Africa remained active and often attacked Portuguese shores and shipping for centuries after 1249. In 1340 the Marinid sultan of Morocco Abu Hasan Ali invaded mainland Iberia with a large army in cooperation with the emir of Granada Yusuf I, however they were repulsed by a joint Portuguese and Castilian force at the Battle of River Salado.

Despite the conquest by Christian forces, many Muslims, as well as Jews, were tolerated and continued to reside in Portuguese territory, in Muslim or Jewish quarters respectively, paying increased taxes in exchange for the privilege, under conditions similar to those that had applied to Christians in Muslim Andalus. Jews were generally protected by medieval Portuguese kings who valued their professional skills and financial know-how. The Jewish community adjusted to the new conditions, retained their identity and grew in numbers as well as prosperity. Muslims in Portugal became known as mudéjares and they included some landowners and skilled artisans, but the majority were poor rural and urban labourers or slaves unable to emigrate, who provided limited unskilled labour force, had little economic significance, presented no threat to the Christian majority and were largely left unmolested in Muslim quarters which were allowed considerable internal autonomy. It was only in the 16th century that they would be forced to convert or be expelled but there was never a systematic campaign to force Muslims or Jews to convert until then and when the final order for expulsion came few mudejáres remained. Among other things, Mudejar art remained as a testimony of Muslim presence in Portuguese territory. A large number of words of Arabic origin came into current use in Portuguese as well.

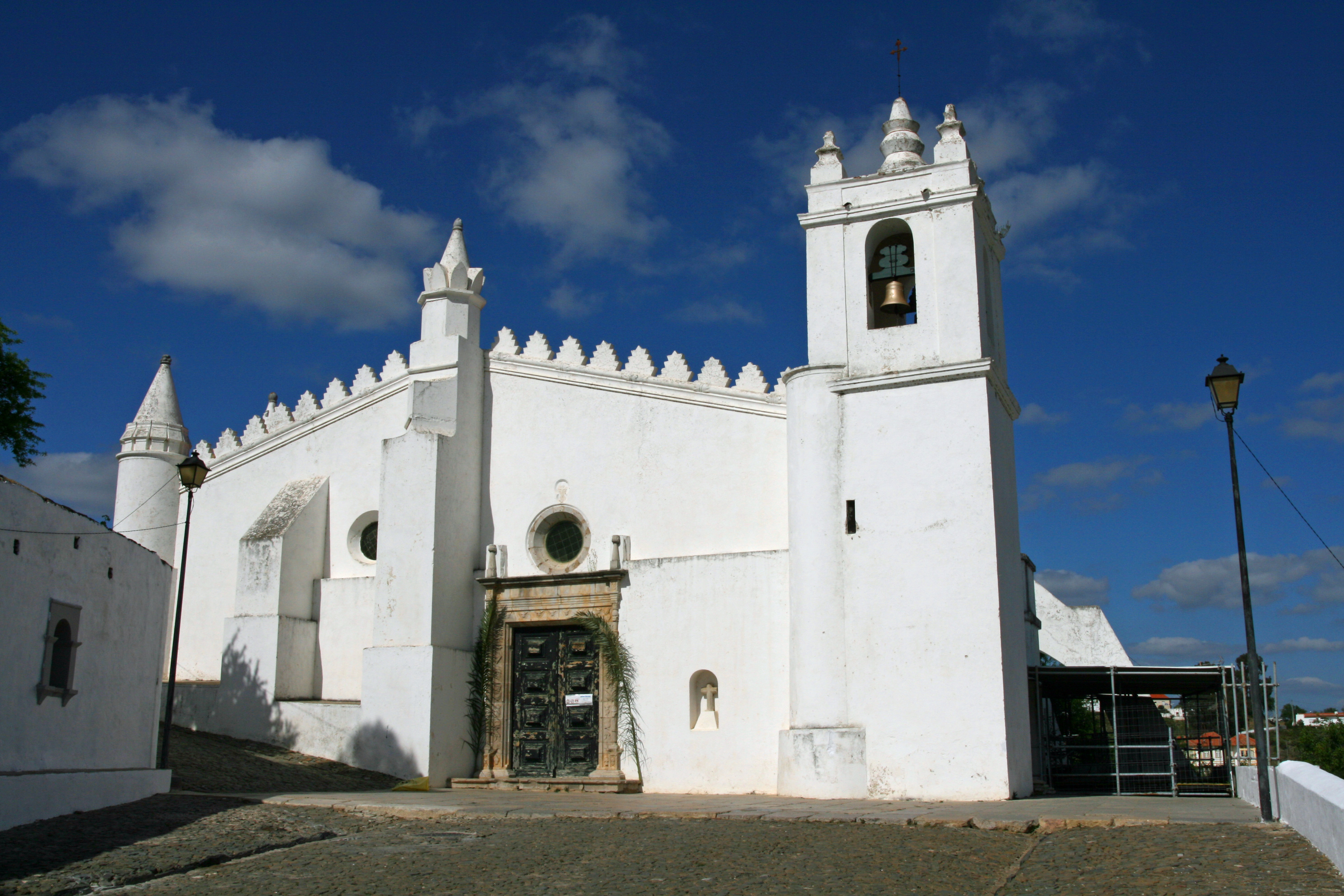
Former mosque of Mértola rechristened as a church.

Memory of the reconquista and the violent or peaceful coexistence between Christians and Muslims persisted for centuries in popular Portuguese imagination and folk tales involving Enchanted Mouras, analogous to the tales of Christian princesses that circulated among Muslims.

== See also ==
- Portugal in the Middle Ages
- Military history of Portugal
- Castles in Portugal
- Knight-villein
- Chivalry
- Albarrana tower
- Crusades
- De expugnatione Scalabis
- De expugnatione Lyxbonensi
- Chronicon Lusitanum
- Timeline of Portuguese history (First Dynasty)
- Lower March
- Knights Templar in Portugal
- Portuguese Romanesque architecture
- Reconquista
