= Battle of Palmela =

Battle of Palmela (1165)
- Part of the Reconquista
Date	1165
Location	Palmela, Kingdom of Portugal
Result	Portuguese victory

Belligerents
Kingdom of Portugal	Almohad Caliphate

Commanders and leaders
Afonso I of Portugal	Governor of Badajoz

Strength
Unknown	Unknown

Casualties and losses
Unknown	Unknown

The Battle of Palmela in 1165 was a military encounter between King Afonso I of Portugal and the Almohad governor of Badajoz. In the battle, Afonso defeated the Almohads and captured the key military fortress of Palmela south of the River Tagus in Portugal.

== Background ==
In 1158, Afonso I of Portugal conquered the fortress and port city of Alcácer do Sal along with numerous other cities and towns in the Alentejo region. After the Battle of Alcácer do Sal in 1161, the Almohads retook these settlements from the Portuguese.

In the years that followed, the Almohads maintained an army in the region to protect the cities and towns that they held from the Portuguese. However, their military forces in Gharb al-Andalus were often stretched thin due to the need to send men and materials to other regions in al-Andalus and to contend with revolts and conflicts in North Africa. As a result, Almohads garrisons in western Iberia were often small and many of the cities and towns that they held were poorly defended and remained contested.

== The battle ==
In 1165, Afonso discovered that the Almohad fortification at Sesimbra on the Atlantic coast was poorly defended. Although the castle sat over 200 meters above the harbor, it was weakly garrisoned and Afonso’s forces were able to seize the castle quickly on February 21 presumably by means of a surprise attack.

When the Almohad governor of Badajoz learnt of the loss of Sesimbra, he assembled a military force and "hastened" to Sesimbra to confront Afonso and recover the castle. At that time, the Governor of Badajoz was in the best position to address the situation as Badajoz was the largest Almohad stronghold in western Iberia and served as a regional center for military operations.

Details of the battle are not perfectly clear. It is generally believed that the governor of Badajoz was attempting to reach Sesimbra as fast as possible and therefore his detachment was marching in a scattered or loose manner designed for speed rather than for engagement. Referred to as “poor order,” this lack of readiness was observed by the Portuguese. Taking advantage of the situation, Afonso left the confines of the Sesimbra castle and went into the countryside to confront the invaders. In the field, Afonso moved to rapidly intercept and catch the Almohads off-guard. In modern terms, this has in some histories been described a surprise encounter or ambush.

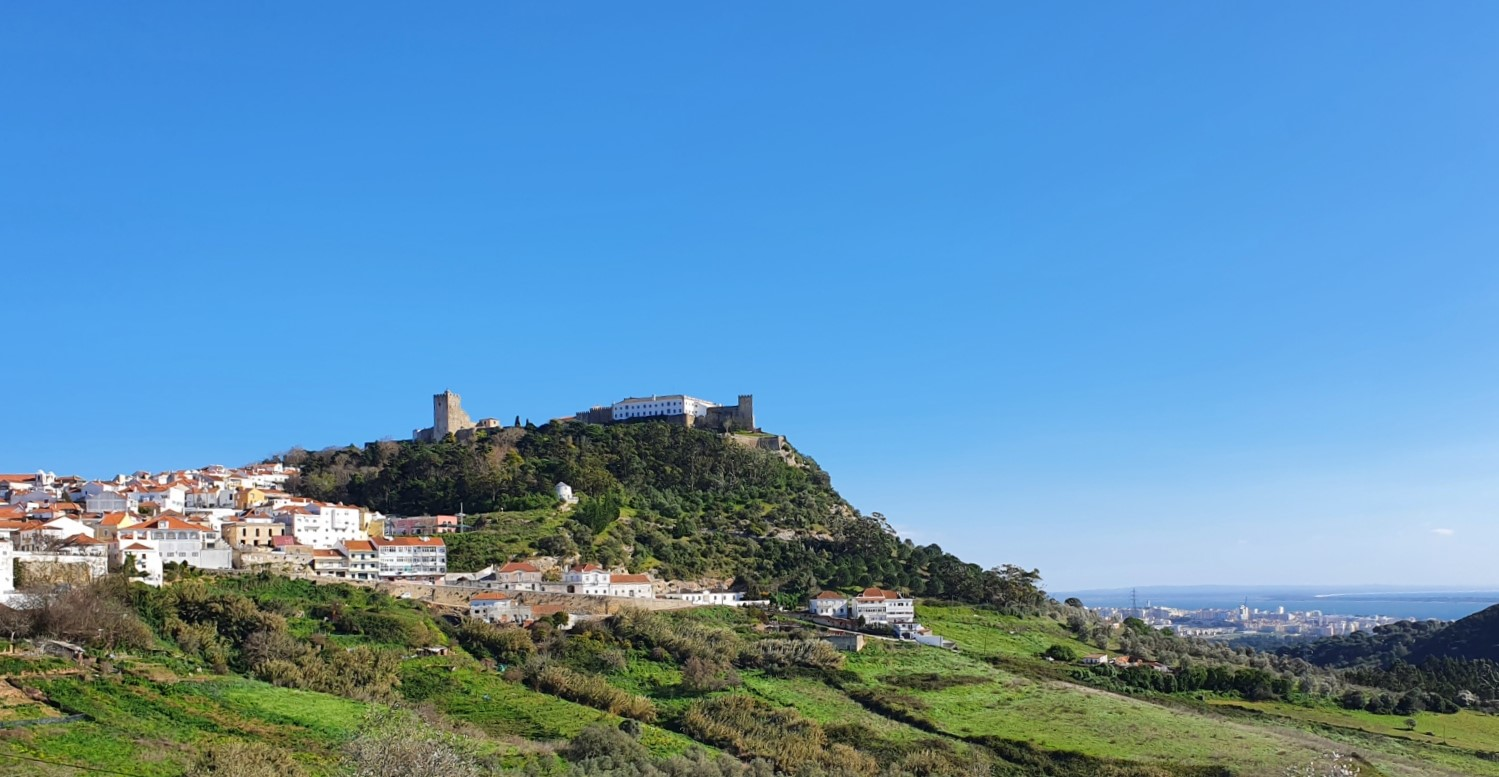
The stronghold of Palmela.

Close to the Palmela fortress, Afonso and the Almohads met and clashed. It has been reported that Afonso’s forces were substantially out-numbered by nearly a factor of ten, but the credibility of these estimates is questionable. Regardless, Afonso and his defenders defeated the Muslim force in battle in the field.

== Aftermath ==
Following the defeat, Almohad control in the region began to collapse beginning with the surrender of Pamela. Then later that same year, the mercenary warrior Gerald the Fearless attacked and captured the fortified city of Évora which he later delivered to Affonso.

== See also ==
- Portugal in the Middle Ages
- Portugal in the Reconquista
- Almohad wars in the Iberian Peninsula
