= Siege of Badajoz (1169) =

Battle between Portuguese and Badajoz

- Part of the Luso–Leonese War (1167–1169), and the Portuguese Reconquista
Date	April–21 May 1169
Location	Badajoz, Spain
Result	Almohad-Leonese victory

Belligerents
Kingdom of Portugal	Almohad Caliphate; Kingdom of León

Commanders and leaders
Afonso I of Portugal (POW); Gerald the Fearless	Umar ibn Temecelite; Ferdinand II of León

Strength
Unknown	Unknown

Casualties and losses
Heavy	Unknown

The Siege of Badajoz (1169) was a military engagement between King Afonso I of Portugal and the Almohad garrison of Badajoz, allied with the Kingdom of León. The allied forces defending Badajoz defeated Afonso and the Portuguese.

== Background ==
Afonso took the throne of Portugal in 1139. As the ruler of the kingdom, Afonso spent the next 30 years attempting to capture numerous Muslim cities and strongholds along the Tagus River and the Atlantic coastline in Gharb al-Andalus. Among his most significant conquests were Santarém, Lisbon, Sesimbra, Alcácer do Sal, and Palmela.

After the Almohads surrendered the Palmela fortress to the Portuguese in the spring of 1165, Afonso shifted the focus of his military campaigns eastward toward the interior of al-Andalus. In October 1165, Gerald the Fearless and his private army captured the heavily fortified Almohad military outpost of Évora 140 kilometers east of Lisbon. Shortly thereafter, Gerald the Fearless gave the city to Afonso and the Portuguese.

Afonso’s rivalry with the kingdoms of León and Castile also started shortly after he took the throne. In 1141, Afonso defeated Alfonso VII of León and Castile at the Battle of Valdevez. Alfonso VIIs successor Ferdinand II refused to acknowledge the independence of Portugal, proclaiming his right over the territory. As a result of the ongoing animosity between the two kingdoms, Ferdinand ordered that the city of Ciudad Rodrigo in the province of Salamanca be fortified and repopulated to such an extent that it could be used to assert Leonese authority over the region and conduct raids into Portuguese territory. Suspecting that the fortification of the city was a preparation for an attack, Afonso sent his son Sancho to destroy the fortress but he was routed routed by Ferdinand in 1167.

== Siege ==
Gerald the Fearless who served as an ally to Afonso and the Portuguese but to a great extent operated independently. He marched to Badajoz in April 1169 with his army and attacked the city. Surrounded by a rampart, the city was largely vacant except for its garrison, as the general population had previously fled due to civil conflict. Its defenders were commanded by Umar ibn Temecelite. Gerald the Fearless successfully surmounted the outer walls and occupied the city proper. Realizing that he could not defend the entire city, Umar retreated into the city's citadel and dispatched messages to Seville requesting aid. As the fighting continued, Afonso and his Portuguese force arrived to support Gerald the Fearless. Desiring to secure the city for the Portuguese crown, Afonso settled his forces in the town and took over the siege of the Almohads in the citadel.

Afonso proceeded to set a deadline for the Almohads to surrender, but Umar was confident that he and his contingent could hold on until a relief force arrived. A relief force ultimately arrived in May, however, the help that came was Leonese rather than Almohad. Ferdinand was allied with the Almohads at that time and did not want the city to fall into the hands of the Portuguese. As such, when he learned that the city was under attack, he set out with his army to relieve the city. As Ferdinand got close to Badajoz, he secretly communicated with the Almohad garrison, informing them that help had arrived and asking them to guide him to a place where his troops could enter. Umar sent a small party of men to a section of the city wall not known to the Portuguese; the Almohads ascended the wall and secretly opened a gate to the city, allowing the Leonese to enter.

Discovering the arrival of Ferdinand, Afonso abandoned his siege of the citadel and turned to confront the Leonese. The Almohads responded by initiating a sortie against the Portuguese, attacking them from behind. The fighting was fierce, and both sides fought bravely until the Leonese-Almohad force defeated the Portuguese. Surprised by this tumult, Afonso tried to escape. As Afonso attempted to flee through a gate, however, his leg was broken against one of the iron bolts. He fell from his horse and was carried away by his men, but ultimately captured by the Leonese.

== Aftermath ==
Afonso was treated with great respect by Ferdinand. He was cared for by physicians and later released in exchange for relinquishing territories that he had captured in Galicia. Gerald the Fearless was also captured and released after ceding several of his newly conquered fortresses—including Trujillo, Montánchez, and Santa Cruz de la Sierra—to buy his freedom.

The Almohads retained their control of Badajoz following the siege gaining only the weaponry, baggage, and supplies left by the Portuguese. Ferdinand made no effort to take control of the city as the goal of his alliance with the Almohads was only to prevent Portuguese expansion. As so, Ferdinand acted primarily as a protector for the city, allowing it to remain a Muslim stronghold rather than letting it fall to his Christian rival, Afonso. It will be another 61 years until the Kingdom of León takes Badajoz from the reigning Muslims.

The defeat was a disaster for Afonso and Portugal. Afonso’s injury left him permanently disabled and unable to ride a horse for the rest of his life. For the remaining 16 years of his reign, Afonso focused primarily on consolidating his existing borders as opposed to further expansion.

== See also ==
- Portugal in the Middle Ages
- Portugal in the Reconquista
- Timeline of Portuguese history (First Dynasty)
- Almohad wars in the Iberian Peninsula
