= Siege of Évora (1181) =

1181 siege in Portugal

- Part of the Reconquista and Almohad wars in the Iberian Peninsula
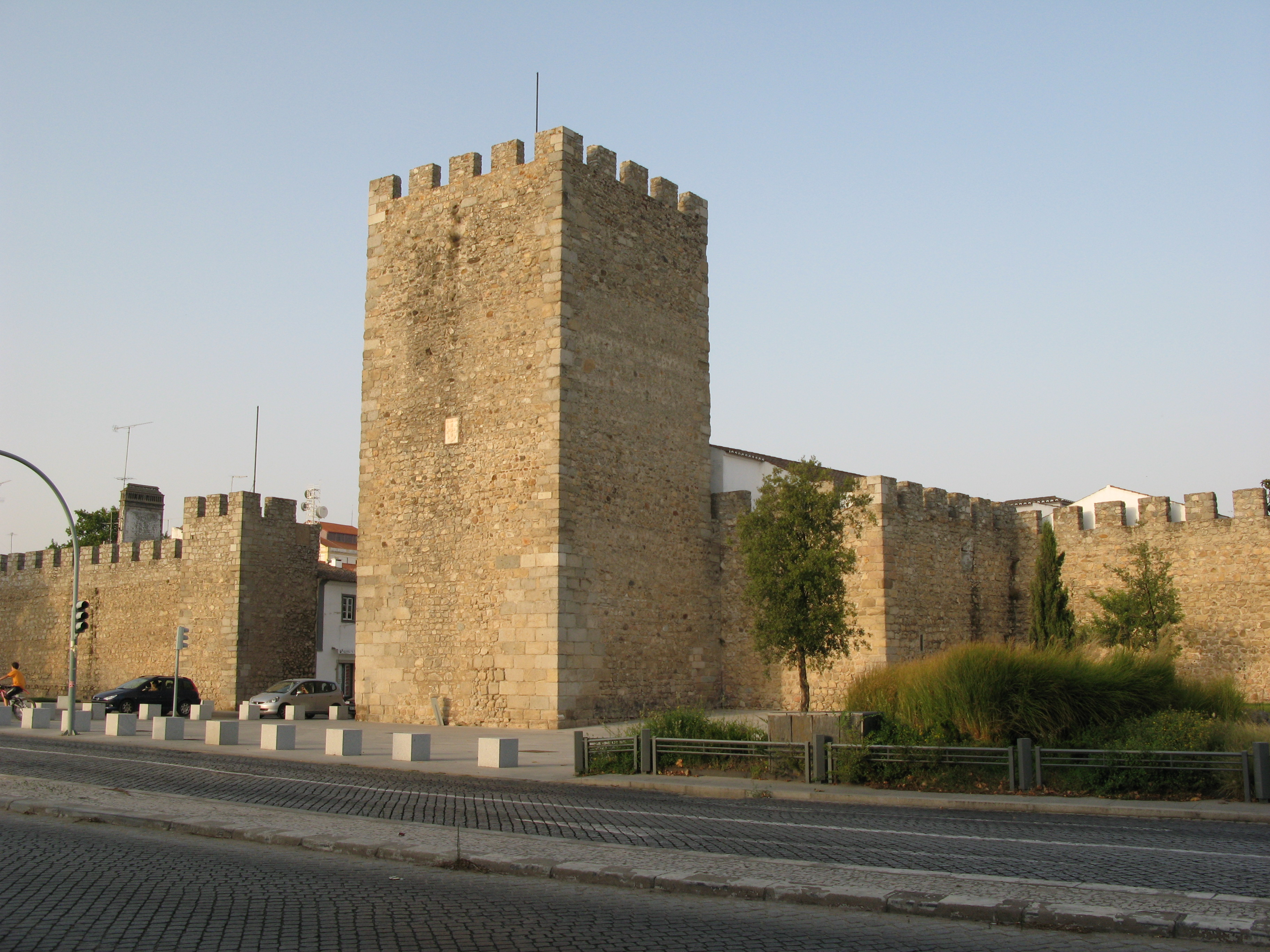
- The walls of Évora
Date	May 25, 1181 – June 1181
Location	Évora, Kingdom of Portugal
Result	Portuguese victory

Belligerents
Kingdom of Portugal	Almohad Caliphate

Commanders and leaders
Undocumented	Mohammed Ibn Iusuf Ibn Wamudin

Casualties and losses
520 captives	Unknown

The Siege of Évora took place in 1181, when an army from the Almohad Caliphate invaded Portugal and besieged the city.

== History ==
In the 12th-century, the city of Évora was one of the most important settlements in the western portion of the Iberian Peninsula. In 1165, the city was captured by Gerald the Fearless by means of a night attack. The following year, a new Order of Portuguese Knight Friars was established in the city, but it was integrated into the Order of Calatrava because it was not authorized by the Pope. In 1173, King Afonso I entered into a truce with the Almohads, who governed approximately half of the Iberian Peninsula. The truce remained in effect until 1178 when Prince Sancho led a bold raid to the gates of Seville, the Almohad capital on the peninsula. Sancho devastated the territory surrounding Seville and the region of Beja during his return to the Portuguese capital, Coimbra.

In 1179, to retaliate for the raid on Seville, the Almohads began a three year campaign to destabilize Portugal. Their first initiative in 1179 was an attempt to invade the Portuguese heartland north of the Tagus River. The Muslims were forced to end this campaign and retreat, however, when they were unable to defeat the Portuguese at the river crossing of Abrantes. In 1180, the Almohads used their navy to conduct raids on the Portuguese coast. The operational approach utilized by the Almohads at that time was to sail past Portuguese land defenses; put raiding parties on shore; ravage the farming communities and settlements; take captives; and quickly depart. This attempt at retribution also failed when the Portuguese put a naval taskforce together and defeated the Almohads at the sea Battle of Cape Espichel.

== The siege of 1181 ==
Finally, over the winter of 1180/1181, Mohammed Ibn Iusuf Ibn Wamudin led an Almohad army from Seville, crossed the Guadiana River, and invaded Portuguese for a third time. Wamudin's army advanced to Évora where on 25 May it proceeded to confiscate and destroy the resources in the surrounding territory and besiege the city. The Portuguese tenaciously defended the city and conducted a sortie into Wamudin's camp. The Portuguese horsemen were, however, easily repelled and forced to retreated back into the city during which many were captured. No additional sorties were attempted by Évora's defenders and the siege continued. In early June, Wamudin ended the siege, gathered over 500 captives, and returned to Seville.

== See also ==
- Portugal in the Middle Ages
- Portugal in the Reconquista
- Conquest of Évora
- Triana raid
- Siege of Abrantes
