= Siege of Santarém (1184) =

Unsuccessful siege in Portugal during the Reconquista

- Part of the Portuguese Reconquista and Almohad wars in the Iberian Peninsula
Date	June–July 1184
Location	Santarém, Portugal
Result	Portuguese victory

Belligerents
Kingdom of Portugal; Kingdom of León	Almohad Caliphate

Commanders and leaders
Afonso I of Portugal; Ferdinand II of León	Abu Yaqub Yusuf †

Strength
Unknown	Unknown

Casualties and losses
Unknown	Unknown

The Siege of Santarém occurred in 1184 when the Almohad Caliph, Abu Yaqub Yusuf, unsuccessfully attempted to capture the fortified Portuguese city of Santarém. The operation failed due to misinterpreted orders and confusion which ultimately resulted in the death of Abu Yusuf.

== Background ==
In the 12th-century, the city Santarém located on the Tagus River was one of the strongest fortified cities in Portugal. Approximately 70 kilometers upstream from Lisbon, Santarém controlled the middle portion of the Tagus River and served as a major military and administrative center for the Kingdom of Portugal. Given its geographic location, Santarém protected the roads linking Lisbon, Coimbra, and Évora, shielding Lisbon from attack from the southeast and protecting the Portuguese heartland north of the Tagus.

The city itself was located on a limestone plateau approximately 100 meters above the river. Sheer slopes leading down from the plateau protected the walled city on all sides except for a relatively narrow approach from the northeast. The city had originally been heavily fortified under Muslim rule early in the 12th-century and those fortifications were repaired and expanded after its capture by Portugal's King Afonso I in 1147. In addition to curtain walls with fortified gates and towers, the city contained an upper castle and an acropolis-like fortified high point.

The location and strength of Santarém made it one of the “Keys of Portugal” in that the loss of such a strategic crossroad would threaten Portugal's continued dominion over the Estremadura and Beira regions.

After Prince Sancho of Portugal completed the highly successful Triana raid in 1178, the Almohads sought to retaliate by conducting military initiatives designed to destabilize the Portuguese frontier. The military campaigns were conducted over a three year period spanning 1179-1181. The initiatives that the Almohads conducted during those three years including the Siege of Abrantes, coastal raids, and the Siege of Évora, were all failures. As a result, Abu Yaqub Yusuf, the Almohad Caliph, took control of the situation himself in 1184 and assembled an army in North Africa that he would personally lead to al-Andalus to invade the Kingdom of Portugal.

== Siege ==
In the spring of 1184, Abu Yusuf crossed the Straits of Gibraltar from North Africa. From Seville, Abu Yusuf led a large field army north to Badajoz then turned to the northwest and traveled across the Portuguese frontier to Santarém. In June, the Muslim army initiated the siege of Santarém.

Within the city of Santarém, the Portuguese defense was personally directed by the aged and partially crippled King Afonso I. Under Afonso I's command, the Santarém garrison valiantly defended the city's walls. Meanwhile, upon hearing of Abu Yusuf's attack, Ferdinand II of León dispatched his troops to relieve Santarém in support of Afonso I, his father-in-law.

As the siege continued, Ferdinand II's Leonese army continued their advance toward Santarém potentially putting pressure on the besieging Muslims by an attack from outside the city. Believing apparently that he had the situation at Santarém under control, Abu Yusuf made the decision to send part of his army to Lisbon to concurrently lay siege to that city.

This decision unexpectedly triggered a disaster. As the reassigned units began to leave Santarém, other units mistakenly assumed that the movement was a general retreat and began to follow. The confusion and withdrawal spread rapidly through the Almohad camp causing great disorder. In an attempt to rally his troops and restore order, Abu Yusuf personally rode to the front and in the process exposed himself to the Portuguese defensive positions along the city's walls. As he did so, Yusuf was hit by a Portuguese crossbow bolt and was mortally wounded.

The Almohad army continued their withdrawal and the siege of approximately one month ended. As the Almohad field army returned to Seville, Abu Yusuf died en route near Évora on 29 July 1184.

== Aftermath ==
The siege of Santarém was a failure by several measures. The Almohads failed to recover the key fortress guarding the middle portion of the Tagus River or to threaten Portugal's heartland; the Almohad caliph was killed; Portugal's frontier along the Tagus River remained in tact; and the young kingdom not only survived, but also gained valuable time to strengthen its defenses.

In addition, the successful defense of Santarém reinforced King Afonso I's standing and aided in the recognition of Portugal's sovereignty with the papacy.

Yaqub al-Mansur succeeded his father as the Almohad caliph and promptly returned to Morocco to deal with Muslim uprisings ending Almohad offensive campaigns in al-Andrus for a period of approximately six years.

== See also ==
- Portugal in the Middle Ages
- Portugal in the Reconquista
- Timeline of Portuguese history (First Dynasty)
