= Capture of Juromenha =

1170 battle during the Portuguese Reconquista

Capture of Juromenha (1170)
- Part of Portuguese Reconquista and Almohad wars in the Iberian Peninsula
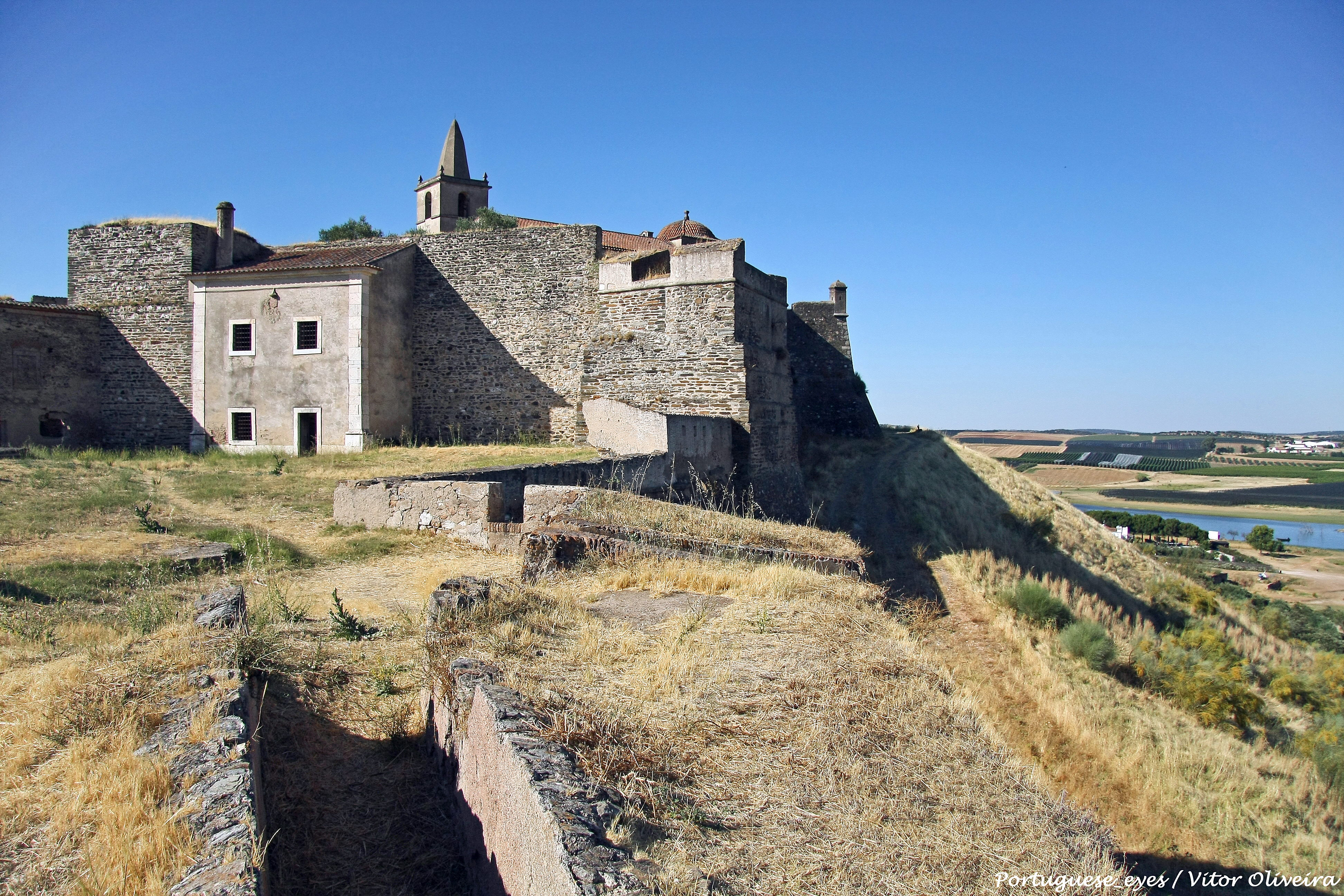
- Juromenha fortress
Date	November 1170
Location	Castelo de Juromenha 38°44′18″N 7°14′24″W
Result	Almohad victory

Belligerents
Kingdom of Portugal	Almohad Caliphate

Commanders and leaders
Gerald the Fearless	Abu Hafs Umar; Al-Sayyid Uthman Abu; Sa'eed

Strength
Unknown	Unknown

The Capture of Juromenha was a successful military raid on the fortress of Juromenha by the Almohad Caliphate in November 1170. The fortress of Juromenha was the base of military operations that Gerald the Fearless and his private army used to conduct raids on the Almohads.The Castle was captured and destroyed by the Almohads, forcing Gerald the Fearless to flee.

== Background ==
After the defeat at the Siege of Badajoz in 1169, Afonso I of Portugal and his ally Gerald the Fearless were captured by Ferdinand II of León. Both men ultimately secured their freedom by ceding Ferdinand contested territory and fortresses. Gerald was forced to relinquish all the strongholds that he possessed except for the fortress at Juromenha. After returning to Juromenha, however, Gerald the Fearless, despite his recent defeat, quickly resumed his attacks against Badajoz, still hoping to one day capture the city.

In April 1170, the Almohad garrison at the city of Badajoz was exhausted from Gerald’s attacks and the confiscation of materials and supplies destined to the fortress. As a result, the Almohad authorities at Seville decided to reinforce Badajoz by means of a caravan carrying supplies, provisions, and 5,000 head of cattle led by Abu Yahya Zakariya. On May 14, as the caravan neared Badajoz, Gerald the Fearless and his army ambushed the wagon train, killing Zakariya and taking the supplies in a crushing defeat for the Almohads.

== The battle ==
Determined to stop the attacks of Gerald the Fearless, the Almohads dispatched a military force from Marrakesh led by Abu Hafs Umar alongside his brother Al-Sayyid Uthman Abu Sa'eed. The army consisting of Almohads and Andalusians was determined to protect Badajoz from Christians.

It was reported that the Muslim army arrived at Badajoz in November and first confronted the Christian forces of Ferdinand II of León. Ferdinand had been the ally of the Almohads at the Siege of Badajoz eighteen months earlier. It seems that Ferdinand may have maintained a small military force at Badajoz after the battle to assist the Almohads in protecting the city from another strike by Afonso and the Portuguese. It is believed that Umar and Sa’eed met with Ferdinand’s commander to ensure that the Leonese would not interfere with the Almohad retaliatory strike against Gerald the Fearless. Ferdinand and the Leonese were likely bound by means of a formal pledge with the Almohads to not support the other's enemies. Historically, no fighting was recorded between the Almohad relief force and the Leonese at Badajoz in November 1170.

After leaving Badajoz, the Almohad relief army marched to Gerald the Fearless’ fortress at Juromenha which he and his warriors had been using as a military base by which to harass and attack Badajoz. The Almohads besieged and captured the fort with the sword, forcing Gerald and his men to flee. Satisfied with their victory, the Almohads demolished the fort and departed for Seville.

== Aftermath ==
After the loss of Juromenha, Gerald retreated to Lobón hoping to establish a new base of operations. The next year, however, another Almohad military force was sent to confront Gerald a second time. Again Gerald and his men were defeated and forced to flee, this time far outside of a striking distance to Badajoz.
