= Spanish–Portuguese War =

Spanish–Portuguese Wars may refer to one of the following conflicts between Portugal and Spain (or between Portugal and Castile before 1492):

- Luso–Leonese War (1130–1137), when Portugal tried to invade Galicia.
- Luso–Leonese War (1162–1165), when Portugal invaded Galicia and annexed the territories of Turonio and Limia
- Luso–Leonese War (1167–1169), when Portugal tried to invade Galicia and Badajoz.
- Portuguese-Castilian War (1250-1253), when Castile attempted to conquer the Algarve
- Fernandine Wars (1369–1370, 1372–1373, 1381–1382), when Portugal attempted to claim the Castilian throne
- 1383–1385 Portuguese interregnum, when Castile attempted to claim the Portuguese throne
- War of the Castilian Succession (1475–1479), when Portugal intervened unsuccessfully in a Castilian civil war
- War of the Portuguese Succession (1580–1583), when Portugal passed under the rule of the Spanish Monarchy
- Portuguese Restoration War (1640–1668), when Portugal regained its sovereignty
- War of the Spanish Succession (1701–1713)
- Spanish–Portuguese War (1735–1737), fought over the Banda Oriental (Uruguay)
- Spanish–Portuguese War (1762–1763), also known as the Fantastic War
- Spanish–Portuguese War (1776–1777), fought over the border between Spanish and Portuguese South America
- War of the Oranges in 1801, when Spain and France defeated Portugal in the Iberian Peninsula, while Portugal defeated Spain in South America
- Invasion of Portugal (1807), a French invasion initially supported by Spain
- Liberal Wars
- Patuleia
- Spanish Civil War, when Portugal supported the "nationalist" or francoist coalition against the Second Spanish Republic.

== See also ==
- List of wars involving Spain
