= Luso-Leonese War (1158–1160) =

Luso–Leonese War of 1158–1160
Date	1158–1160
Location	Iberian Peninsula
Result	Treaty of Celanova
Territorial changes	Status quo ante bellum

Belligerents
Kingdom of Leon	Kingdom of Portugal

Commanders and leaders
Ferdinand II of Leon	Afonso I of Portugal

The Luso-Leonese War of 1158 to 1160 was a brief armed conflict between Portugal and León. It was caused by disputes between the Portuguese king, Afonso Henriques, and his Leonese counterpart, Ferdinand II.

== Context ==
On 21 August 1157, Emperor Alfonso VII of León, cousin of Afonso Henriques, died. As had been stipulated two years earlier, Alfonso VII's domains were divided between his two sons: Sancho III was attributed Castile and Ferdinand II was given León.

Under the Treaty of Sahagún signed on 23 May 1158, Sancho III and Ferdinand II agreed to help each other conquer Portugal if the opportunity arose, among other things. They also claimed exclusive rights to the conquest of Muslim territory and denied Portugal any such rights. The Alentejo and Algarve would be left to the Kingdom of León. At the end of August 1158, however, Sancho III died, while in León revolts broke out at Lugo, Zamora, Salamanca and Ledesma.

In Portugal, Afonso Henriques was engaged in the siege of Alcácer do Sal. Having taken this city on 24 July 1158 and now that King Ferdinand was struggling with internal difficulties, he decided to take advantage of the situation to launch a pre-emptive attack, before a possible reunification of Castile and León under Ferdinands sceptre.

== The war ==
Taking advantage of the revolt in Zamora and other cities on the western border of León, Afonso Henriques crossed the Galician border at the head of his troops in September 1158 and he occupied the lands of Turonio, the capital of which was Tui. Fighting in Galicia continued until November.

Hostilities did not take long to cease after the occupation of Tui, as Ferdinand II wished to focus on the matter of succession in Castile rather than fight the Portuguese. The two kings met in Cabrera and, on 14 November 1158, signed a truce. King Ferdinand II disregarded both the Treaty of Sahagún as well as the heir of King Sancho III and he invaded Castile to try to seize the kingdom by force of arms.

By Christmas 1159, Ferdinand II once again met with Afonso Henriques in Santa María del Palo, near Tui, and they signed a renewal of the truce.

The following month, in January 1160, Afonso Henriques received in the same place the Count of Barcelona, Ramon Berenguer IV, married to Queen Petronilla of Aragon. They agreed that Afonso Henriques' daughter, Mafalda, would marry Raimundo and Petronila's heir, Afonso in exchange for an alliance between Portugal and Aragon. This marked the beginning of a policy of rapprochement between the two kingdoms at opposite ends of the peninsula against the growing power of León and Castile.

By the end of 1160 however, Ferdinand II had stabilised the political situation in León and regained enough strength to force a new peace treaty on Afonso Henriques, which was signed at the monastery of Celanova.

== See also ==
- Portugal in the Middle Ages
- Luso-Leonese War (1130–1137)
- Luso-Leonese War (1162–1165)
- Luso-Leonese War (1167–1169)
- Portugal in the Reconquista
- History of Galicia
