= Castle of Palmela =

Castle in Palmela, Setúbal, Portugal

Coordinates: 38°33′58″N 8°54′04″W

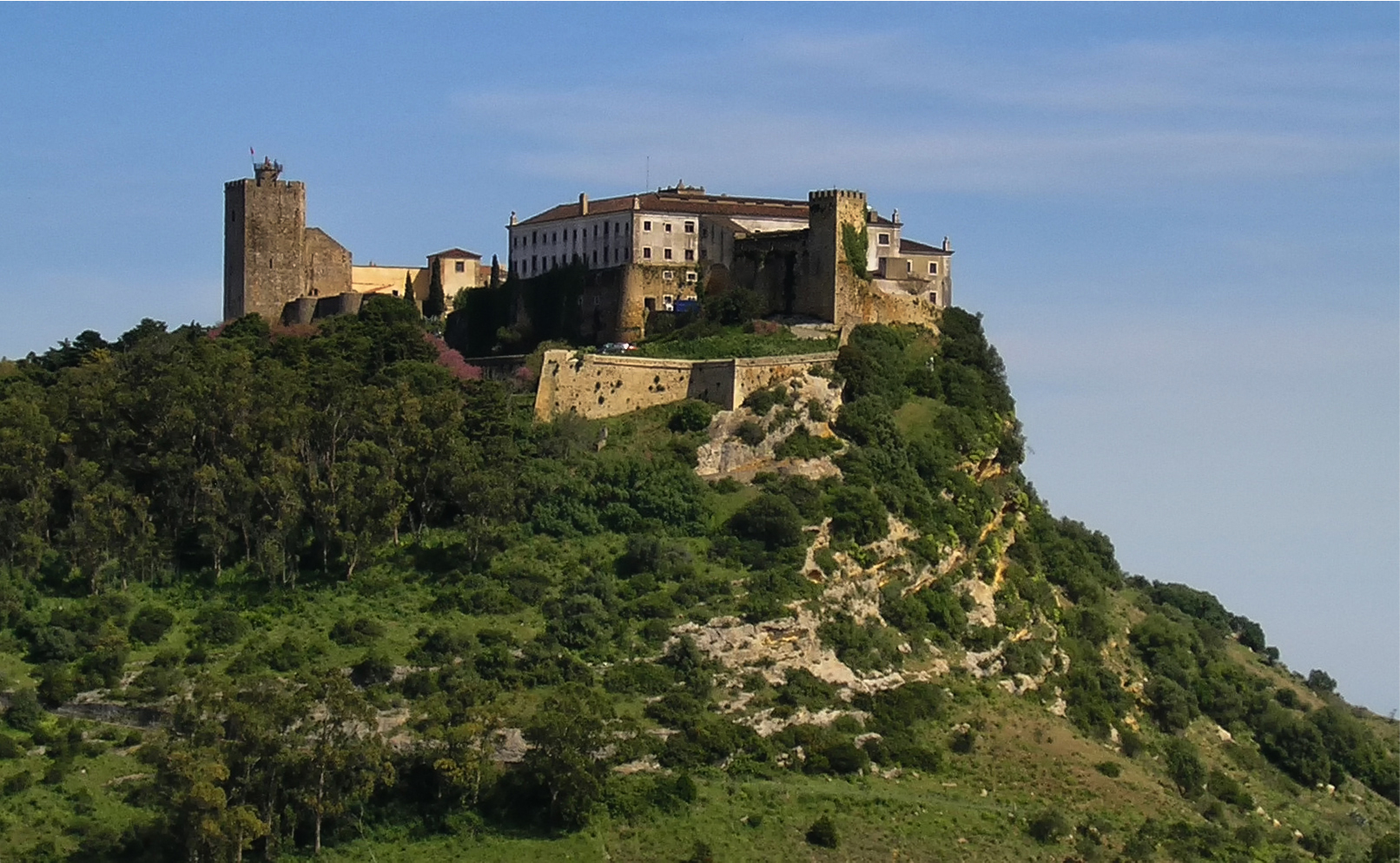
Palmela Castle, Setúbal, Portugal

Castle of Palmela is a castle in Portugal. It is classified as a National Monument.

The Castle of Palmela is located in the village, parish and county of the same name, district of Setúbal, in Portugal .

In Setúbal Peninsula, in the east side of the Arrábida mountain range, it is situated between the estuaries of the River Tagus and Sado River, near the mouth of the latter. It is part of the Costa Azul, in Arrábida Natural Park.

The early human occupation of the region dates back to prehistory, particularly the Neolithic period, according to the abundant archaeological testimony. Some scholars point to date of 310 BC for the founding of a settlement on the current location, fortified at the time of Romanization of the Iberian Peninsula in 106, by a Praetor of Lusitania, named Áulio Cornelius (or Áulio Cornelius Palma). Modern archaeological research proves, however, that the subsequent occupation of this site was uninterrupted, initially by the Visigoths and later the Muslims, the latter responsible for the primitive fortification between the eighth century and the ninth, greatly expanded between the tenth century and the 12th.

== See also ==
- Portugal in the Middle Ages
  - Portugal in the Reconquista
