= Triana raid =

Prince Sancho of Portugal conducts a daring raid on the Almohads in 1178

Triana Raid
- Part of the Reconquista
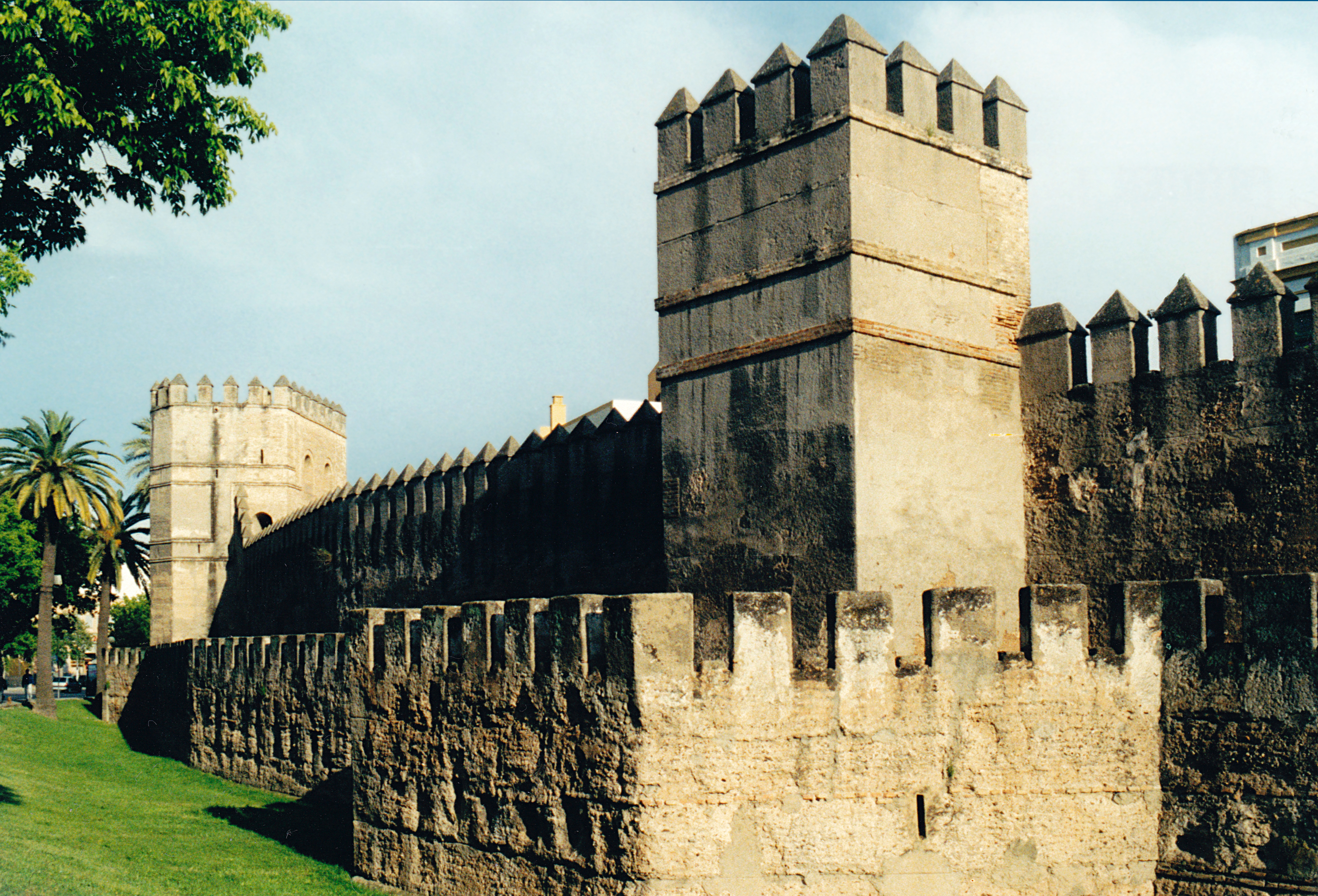
- Almohad walls of Seville
Date	May–July 1178
Location	Extremadura and Alentejo
Result	Portuguese victory

Belligerents
Kingdom of Portugal	Almohad Caliphate

Commanders and leaders
Prince Sancho	Ibn Wazir †; Ibn Timsalit †

Strength
5,000 footmen 2,300 cavalry	Unknown

Casualties and losses
Unknown	Heavy; Rich spoils captured

The Triana Raid was an exceptionally bold raid conducted by Prince Sancho of Portugal in 1178. With an army exceeding 7,000 men, the expedition led by Sancho traveled nearly 400 kilometers to the Almohad capital of Seville destroying settlements and food supplies throughout the journey. It was one of the most daring military operations conducted in the history of Portugal, it allowed the prince Sancho to affirm himself as a worthy commander and heir to the throne and ultimately propelled the international recognition of Portugal as an independent sovereign nation.

== Background ==
Almohad raids after the Battle of Calatrava had forced the Castilians and the Portuguese to enter into a five-year truce with the Muslims in July 1173. During the period of truce, the Almohads took the opportunity to repair, enhance, and re-garrison selected border strongholds including the walled cities of Mértola and Beja. These actions were seen by the Portuguese as evidence that the Almohads were preparing to renew war as soon as the truce expired. Restoring the military capacity of Portuguese forces so that they would be ready to fight as soon as the truce ended was also a necessity. As a result, Sancho made the decision to preemptively attack the Almohads.

Prince Sancho was acting as Rex-Designatus (Designated King) for Portugal as his father, Afonso I, was physically infirm. Under consideration was whether Sancho was a commander capable of operating independently of his father and a worthy heir to the throne. In his position, Sancho was the sole commander and architect of the expedition. Unlike a general, Sancho had the authority during the campaign to dole out special privileges including land grants, an act normally reserved only for the king.

For the raid, Sancho assembled one of the largest Portuguese forces mobilized to that date, consisting of approximately 5,000 footmen and 2,300 cavalry. Troops included the king's own host; the private retinues of high-ranking nobles; urban militias from major cities like Lisbon, Coimbra, Évora, and Santarém; and the specialized contingents of the Order of Calatrava.

== Campaign ==
Troops gathered in Coimbra, the capital of Portugal and in May 1178, Sancho began the campaign into Almohad territory. After leaving Coimbra, the Portuguese camped for a day at Penela. As the army continued its march south, Sancho separated his forces for logistical reasons and to avoid detection by the Muslims. Moving at a fairly quick pace of almost 50 kilometers a day, they gathered at Golegã. From there they crossed the Tagus River and reached the Portuguese walled city of Évora after four days. At Évora Sancho received reinforcements from Santarém and Lisbon. As scouts reported no enemy activity, they traveled to the Portuguese outpost at the Castle of Valongo where a temporary base of operations was established. From Valongo, Sancho launched algaras or small raids into the surrounding territory.

From the Castle of Valongo, Sancho and his army continued their raid to the south. Sancho’s army sacked the territory surrounding the Almohad city of Beja, but did not attack the heavily fortified, walled compound. Wherever possible, the army captured spoils and destroyed crops as they advanced.

After crossing the mountains of the Sierra Morena, the Portuguese force reached Seville in late June or early May, catching the Almohads off guard and set up camp just a few kilometers west of the city across the Guadalquivir River.

=== Battle ===
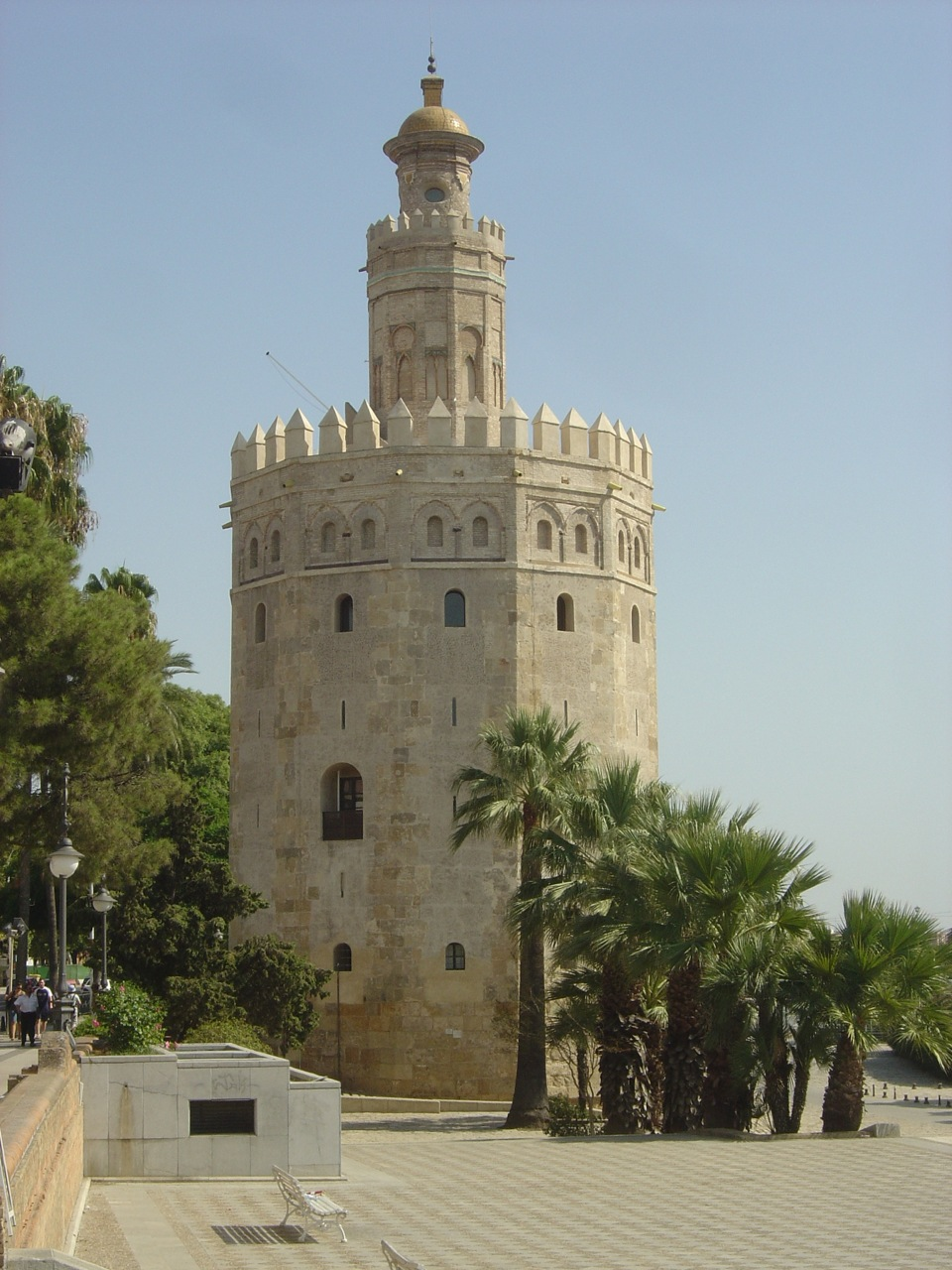
The Almohad-built Torre del Oro.

At Triana, Sancho’s objective was to destroy the crops and infrastructure that fed the Almohad capital of Seville. Although the Portuguese army was quite large, there is no historical evidence that Sancho ever intended to directly attack Seville. The Portuguese mission objective was to conduct a fast and destructive raid into the enemy’s territory. As such, Sancho’s army was not equipped with siege engines or the kind of war materials that would have been necessary to breach Seville’s massive walls. Lack of specialized heavy equipment also prevented the Portuguese from attempting to destroy the pontoon bridge spanning the Guadalquivir River near the Torre del Oro watchtower.

Because they were concerned about the potential loss of the pontoon bridge and the agricultural resources of Triana, the Almohads reacted quickly to the presence of the Portuguese and sent a large force out of the city to confront and repulse the raiders.

In the conflict, the Portuguese battle order consisted of a vanguard, centre, rearguard, and two wings in addition to a reserve tasked with defending the camp. Sancho commanded the vanguard with 600 horsemen and 1,500 foot soldiers, while the rearguard was composed of 600 horsemen, but no infantry. Two-hundred fifty horsemen were posted in each of the wings along with 2,000 foot soldiers. The reserve consisted of spearmen and arbalist.

The Almohad force consisted of light cavalry in the vanguard and infantry in the rearguard with the possible presence of heavy Andalusian knights and black slave archers. The Almohads crossed the Guadalquivir River despite the possibility that such an action might leave them trapped between the Portuguese and the river.

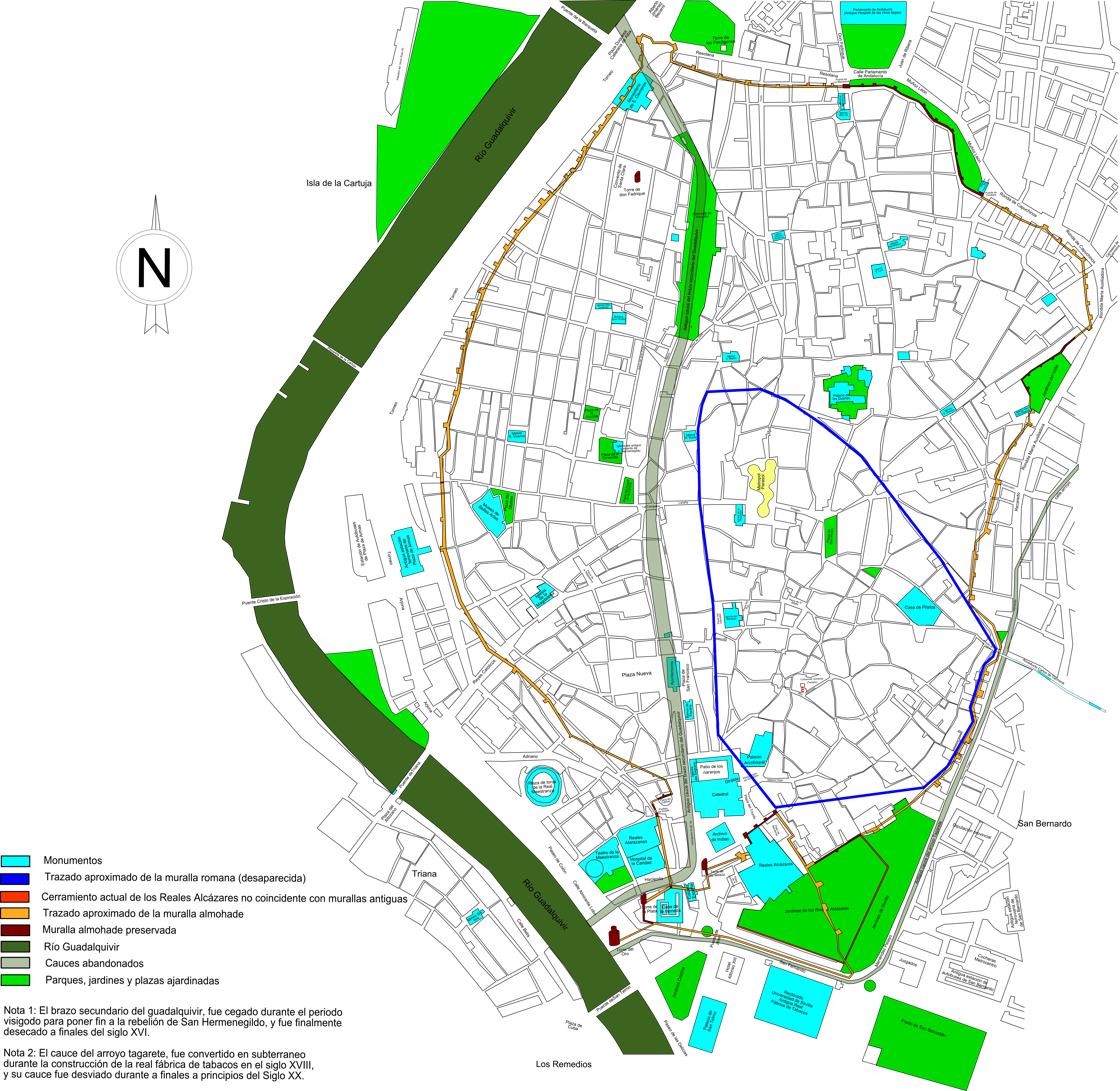
Plan of the walls of Seville.

Fighting began with an exchange of projectiles and skirmishing maneuvers by the Almohad light cavalry. Although the granular details of the battle are not perfectly clear, it was reported that the heavy cavalry squadrons of the Portuguese vanguard advanced first in a charge against the Almohad lines. It is believed that the Portuguese aimed to hit the enemy in a tight, synchronized "conroi" formation with knights riding knee-to-knee in an effort to punch holes in the Almohad line. The Almohad line held, however, absorbing the impact, and the Portuguese formation shattered into numerous small unorganized groups.

Immediately thereafter, it is believed that the Almohad cavalry moved to encircle and swarm the isolated riders of the stalled Portuguese vanguard, attacking them from all sides. In this chaos, it appears that Sancho was trapped and in “great peril” as were all the members of the Portuguese vanguard. Realizing that the Prince was in danger, the Portuguese central army immediately moved forward and attacked the Almohads in the center and on the wings. Realizing that they could not withstand the force of the full Portuguese army, the Almohads broke away from the fight and fled back to the safety of Seville.

The battle was over and shortly thereafter, Sancho and the Portuguese set about destroying the suburbs of Seville. Almohad galleys anchored on the Guadalquivir were destroyed to prevent the Almohads from using the transports in an attempt to cut off their retreat. Triana was sacked and the Portuguese force began its journey home.

=== Return journey ===
On the return journey to Coimbra, Sancho and the Portuguese army took a different route home as they passed through Almohad territory in order to cause as much damage as possible. The Almohad cities of Gibraleón and Niebla were targeted. Since these outposts were well-fortified regional hubs with permanent garrisons, it is doubtful that Sancho attacked the cities directly, but more likely that the Portuguese attacked the surrounding agricultural settlements, destroying as much of the agriculture as possible. It is also believed that Sancho destroyed the “Albarrana” watchtowers built outside the cities’ main walls and smaller "couraça" towers which protected access to water. Such actions would make it difficult for the cities to track an enemy’s movements and to defend themselves in future attacks.

Continuing on, Sancho crossed the Guadiana River near Mértola, at Vale das Azenhas, ultimately reaching the vicinity of the Almohad fortress of Beja sometime in mid-July. At Beja, Sancho learned that the Almohad garrisons of Beja and Serpa, commanded by ibn Timsalit and ibn Wazir, respectively, were in the field raiding the territory near the Portuguese fortress of Alcácer do Sal sixty kilometers to the northwest. As a result, Sancho sent a contingent force of 1,400 light cavalrymen to assist the forces at Alcácer do Sal. A battle ensued in which members of the city’s garrison sallied out and confronted the Muslims head-on while Sancho’s cavalry attacked the raiders in the rear and flanks. The Almohads raiders were defeated including their commanders who were slain in the skirmish.

== Aftermath ==
Sacking Triana was a massive blow to Almohad prestige and supply lines. In the three years that followed, the Almohads attempted to retaliate by conducting military initiatives designed to destabilize the Portuguese frontier. Their efforts, however, were largely ineffective.

In 1179, the Almohads conducted an unsuccessful four-day siege of the key Portuguese fortress of Abrantes on the Tagus River while their naval forces raided the outlying areas of Lisbon. In 1180, the Almohads successfully captured and destroyed the Portuguese border settlement of Coruche with its modest castle. At sea, however, the Almohad fleet was defeated by the Portuguese navy off Lisbon at the Battle of Cape Espichel. Finally in 1181, at their last attempt to retaliate, the Almohads attacked, but failed in an attempt to capture the important Portuguese stronghold of Évora.

For Prince Sancho and the Portuguese, however, the raid was a tremendous success, not so much for the destruction that was caused, but rather for the transformation of Sancho and Portugal. Sancho’s leadership had shown the Portuguese nobility and military orders that he was a capable successor to his father. As such, the raid transformed Sancho from a "shadow heir" into a respected sovereign.

Furthermore, Sancho’s performance demonstrated that Portugal under his rule would be a viable state that would not only survive, but grow and expand. In that regard, the raid seemed to be an immediate catalyst for Pope Alexander III to issue the Manifestis Probatum in 1179, confirming the kingdom's sovereignty and legitimizing its expansion. Three Popes had previously withheld recognition of Portugal as an independent kingdom and Afonso I as a king.

The "astonishing" nature of the raid, particularly "intrepidly exterminating... the enemies of the Christian name,” however, proved to the Pope that the Portuguese leader was a true "Athlete of Christ" and a sovereign in his own right. As such, when the Manifestis Probatum was issued, the Pope accepted Portugal as a direct vassal of the Holy See, no longer legally subject to the King of León. An attack on Portugal thereafter would be an attack on the Pope's direct vassal. The ruler of Portugal would be recognized as a king and Portuguese kings would have the right to conquer any territory held by the Muslims that was not already claimed by another Christian king.

In summary, the Triana raid of 1178 transformed Portugal from a vulnerable, unrecognized breakaway province to a recognized European power.

== See also ==
- Portugal in the Middle Ages
- Military history of Portugal
- Almohad wars in the Iberian Peninsula
