= Conquest of Évora =

1165 Portuguese conquest

Conquest of Évora (1165)
- Part of the Reconquista and Almohad wars in the Iberian Peninsula
Date	1165
Location	Évora, Portugal
Result	Portuguese victory
Territorial changes	Definitive conquest of Évora by the Christians

Belligerents
Kingdom of Portugal; Host of Gerald	Almohad Caliphate

Commanders and leaders
Gerald the Fearless	Unknown

Strength
Unknown	Unknown

Casualties and losses
Unknown	Unknown

The Conquest of Évora in 1165 was an episode of the Reconquista launched by Gerald the Fearless, who conquered the city from the Muslims during the night with a contingent of soldiers. Évora was then handed over to the Afonso I of Portugal and definitively integrated into his Kingdom.

== Background ==
The conquest of the important port city of Alcácer do Sal in 1158, by the king of Portugal made the occupation of the interior Alentejo possible, if not inevitable. Évora was an important city in the west of the Iberian Peninsula and was taken by the Portuguese shortly afterwards. However, the Almohads reconquered it in 1161, following the Battle of Alcácer do Sal, together with all the conquests south of the Tagus except Alcácer do Sal. On November 30, 1162, a group of knight-villeins from Santarém conquered Beja during the night, in the same way that Afonso I had conquered Santarém in 1147.

Gerald the Fearless suffered the displeasure of the king Afonso I due to violent crimes, therefore fled from justice, gathered a group of marginal or outlaw warriors around him and gave himself up to a life of rustling cattle, villages and Muslim castles on the Alentejo plain, which would eventually allow him to obtain a royal pardon.

Having on one occasion observed that Évora was poorly defended, the Fearless convinced his soldiers to risk conquering the city through a surprise attack.

== The Conquest ==
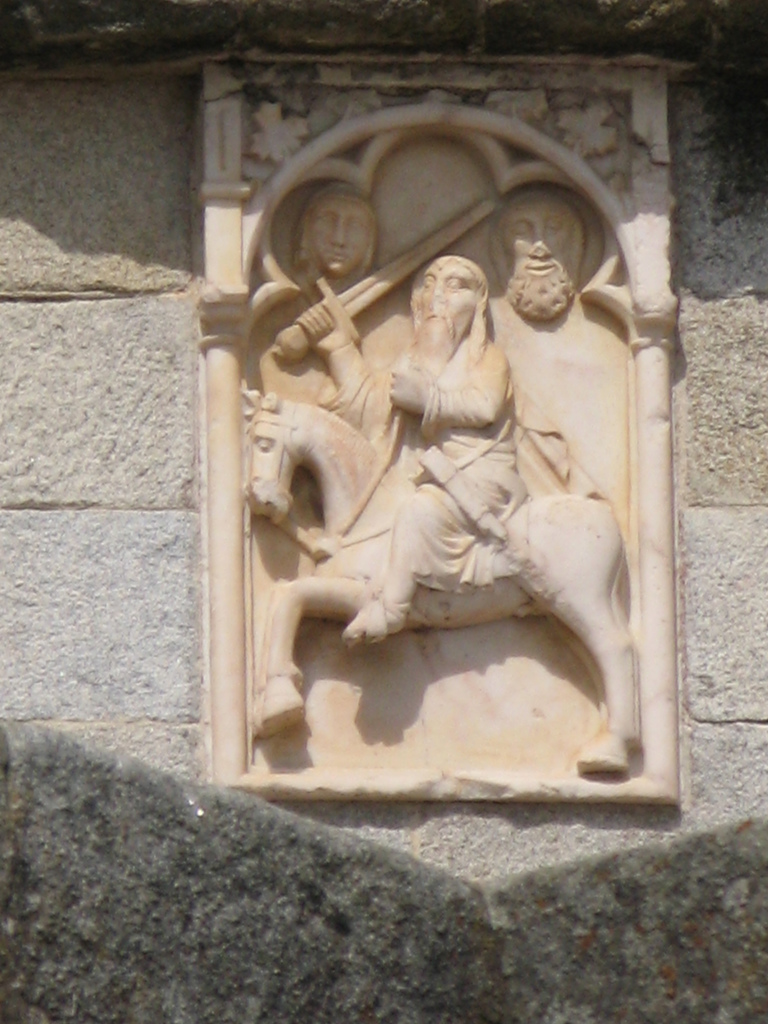
Effigy of Gerald the Fearless in Évora's Cathedral.

One night in September or October 1165, Gerald and his men seized a watchtower located on a hill near Évora and killed the sentry, without the city's garrison noticing anything. A detachment then hid near the city, while another approached the gates to provoke the garrison. The alarm was raised and a large contingent of Muslim troops quickly set out in their pursuit.

The men were ambushed, but they climbed the doors while the garrison was outside and conquered the city, with many residents dying in the action. The Muslim forces later returned, upon realizing that the city was now in the hands of the Portuguese. They still tried to recover it, however, in vain; some died in action and abandoned it.

== Aftermath ==
Gerald handed the city over to Afonso I of Portugal in exchange for money and the king not only forgave him but also appointed him as alcaide of Évora. The following year, a new Order of knights settled in Évora to help defend the city but, as it was not authorized by the Pope, they were integrated into the Order of Calatrava, which thus entered Portugal. In 1176, Afonso I donated the town of Coruche to this Order, so that they could build a castle there to protect the road that connected Santarém to Évora.

Cross of the Order of Calatrava

The city was besieged in 1181 by an Almohad army commanded by Mohammed Ibn Iusuf Ibn Wammudin. Évora, however, resisted the incursion and at the beginning of the following year the Muslims were forced to abandon the siege.

When the Almohad Caliph invaded Portugal in 1191 at the head of a huge army, all Portuguese conquests south of the Tagus were lost with the exception of Évora, which remained a Christian enclave surrounded by Muslim territory. Alentejo would only be definitively conquered between 1217 and 1238.

== See also ==
- Portugal in the Middle Ages
- Portugal in the Reconquista
- Battle of Évora (1808)
