= Palmela =

Municipality in Lisbon Region, Portugal

- Municipality
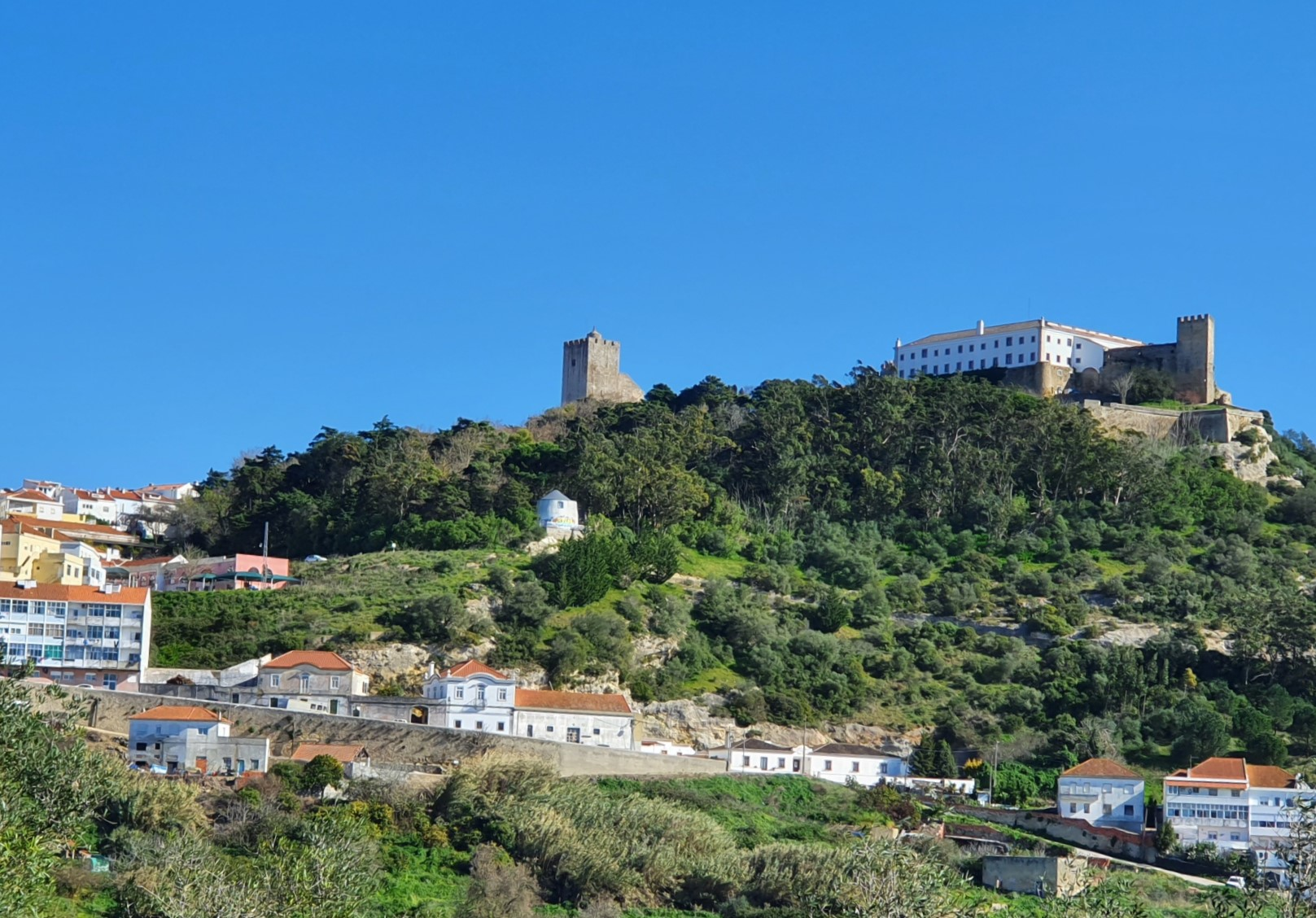
- View of Palmela and the town's castle

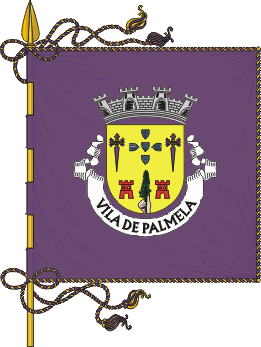
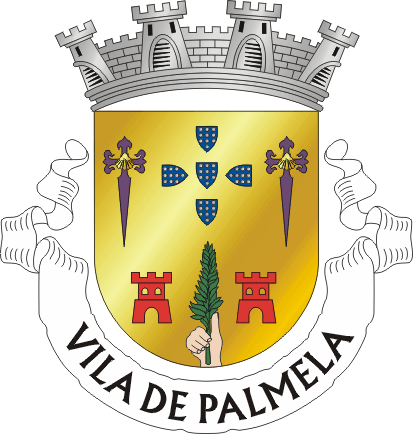
- Flag Coat of arms
- Interactive map of Palmela
- Coordinates: 38°34′N 8°54′W
- Country: Portugal
- Region: Lisbon
- Metropolitan area: Lisbon
- District: Setúbal
- Parishes: 4

Government
  - President: Álvaro Balseiro Amaro (CDU)

Area
  - Total: 465.12 km^{2} (179.58 sq mi)

Population (2021)
  - Total: 68,856
  - Density: 148.04/km^{2} (383.42/sq mi)
- Time zone: UTC+00:00 (WET)
  - Summer (DST): UTC+01:00 (WEST)
- Local holiday: 1 June
- Website: http://www.cm-palmela.pt

Palmela (Portuguese pronunciation: [palˈmɛlɐ]) is a town and municipality in Portugal. As of 2011, the population was 62,831, covering an area of 465.12 km².

The municipality is located in the Lisboa Region and Setúbal District, about 25 km (16 mi) south of Lisbon. The municipal holiday is celebrated on 1 June.

== Communes ==
Administratively, the municipality is divided into four civil parishes (freguesias):

- Palmela
- Pinhal Novo
- Poceirão e Marateca
- Quinta do Anjo

== General information ==
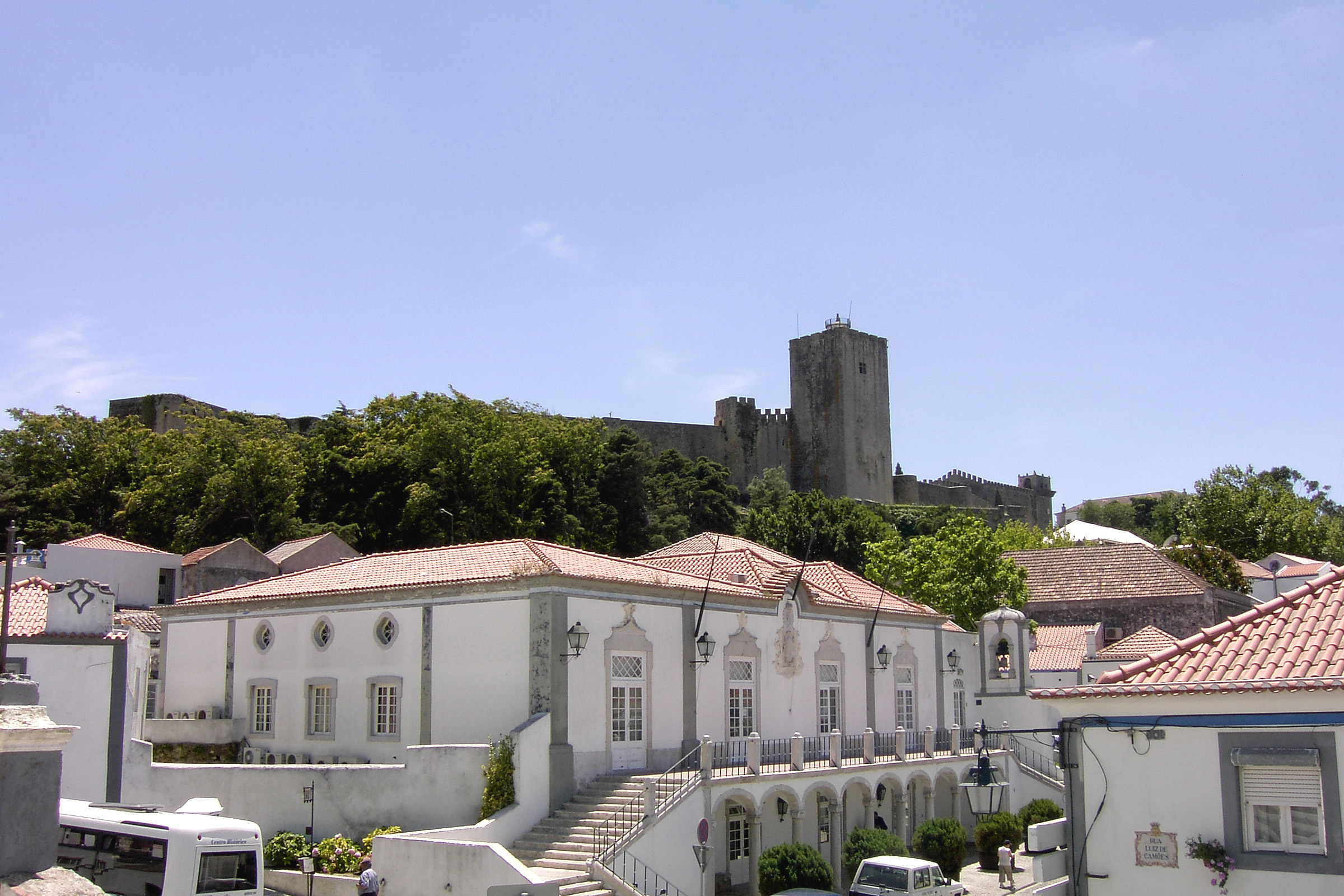
View of Palmela, with the Municipality building (foreground) and castle uphill.

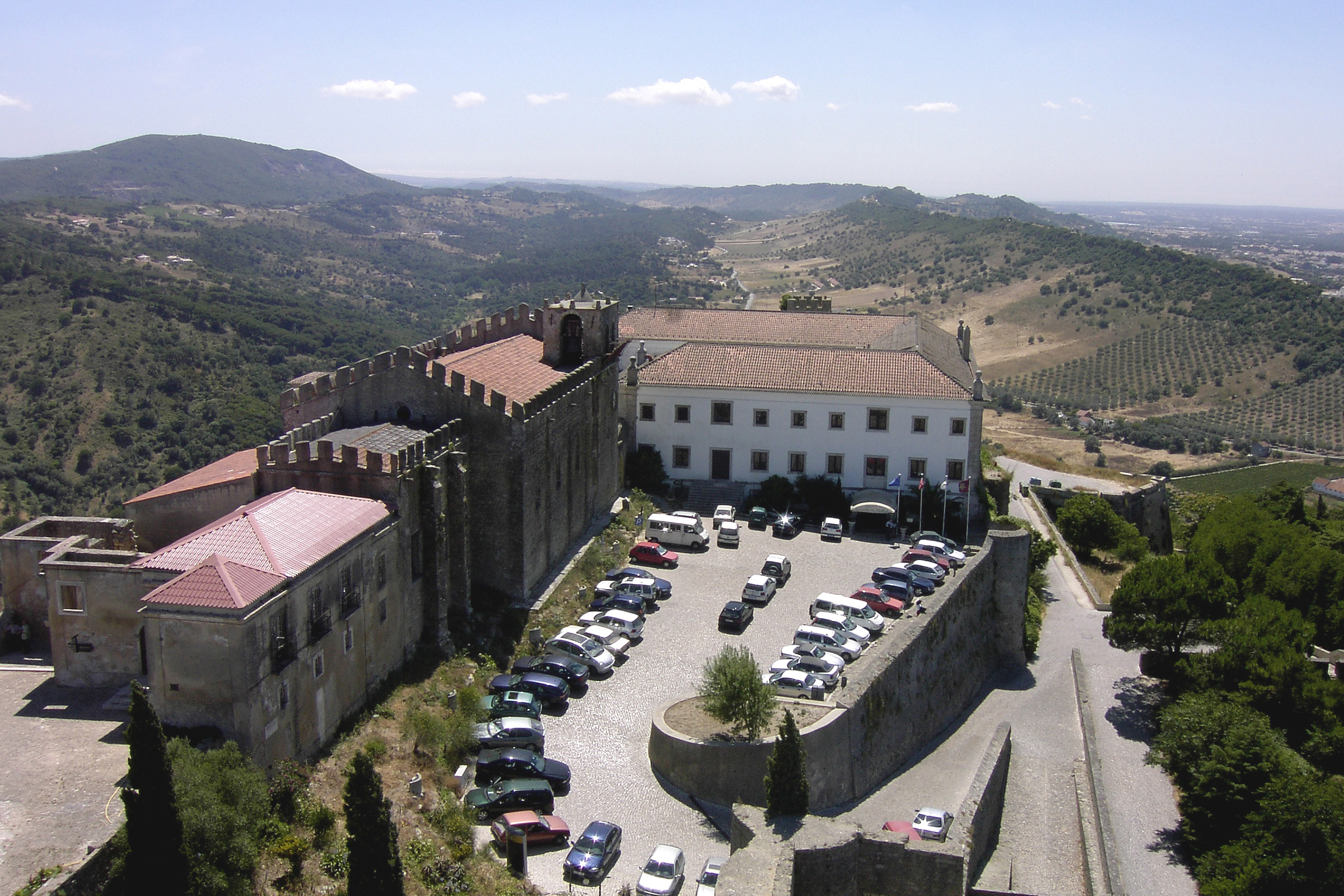
Castle of Palmela and surrounding landscape.

The area has been settled since at least Neolithic times, as evidenced by excavations at sites such as the artificial caves of Casal do Pardo and the Castro of Chibanes. The town's name originates from its Roman founder, Cornelius Palma (Palmella). Palmela, which was once a fortress, was conquered by the Portuguese in the 12th century. It is a semi-rural town situated on a hill in the Arrábida area, within Portugal's largest urban area. Many people are relocating to Palmela from larger cities like Lisbon. Wildfires in the region pose a threat to the environment.

In 1165, during the Reconquista, a battle was fought near Palmela in which the Portuguese defeated a large Muslim army.

The castle, Castelo de Palmela, offers a unique view of the entire Setúbal Peninsula, Lisbon, and the Atlantic Coast. It was a strategic location in past centuries and remains a major junction in Portugal's road and rail networks today.

Palmela is home to several multinational industrial units, such as Volkswagen and Coca-Cola, and a significant number of foreign families reside in the area. The local radio often broadcasts in Ukrainian.

Palmela's traditional products include its wine, which has won international awards at several festivals such as the Bordeaux Wine Festival, and Queijo de Azeitão (Azeitão cheese). There are several festivals dedicated to these products, with the most famous being the Festa das Vindimas (Harvest' Festival) and the Festival do Queijo, Pão e Vinho (Festival of Cheese, Bread and Wine).

Palmela is the birthplace of the Portuguese explorer Hermenegildo Capelo. Additionally, some other famous individuals, such as Hans Christian Andersen, were briefly hosted there.

== Economy ==
The municipality is renowned for its production of fruit and wine.

In the 1990s, the joint-venture Volkswagen-Ford AutoEuropa vehicle production plant opened to produce the Mk1 MPV, sold under three marques: Volkswagen Sharan, SEAT Alhambra and Ford Galaxy. After Ford left the joint venture, the plant continued to produce Volkswagen and SEAT models and added the Volkswagen Eos, Volkswagen Scirocco and Volkswagen T-Roc.

== Notable people ==
- Hermenegildo Capelo (1841 in Palmela – 1917) an officer in the Portuguese Navy and an explorer, charted territory between Angola and Mozambique
- Hugo José Jorge O'Neill (1874 – 1940 in Palmela) the head of the Clanaboy O'Neill dynasty
- Octávio Machado (born 1949) a retired footballer and coach with 307 club caps and 19 for Portugal
- Ricardo Pateiro (born 1980 in Palmela) a Portuguese retired footballer with 270 club caps

== See also ==
- Palmela DOC
