= Battle of Cape Espichel =

12th century naval battle in Portugal

- Part of the Reconquista and Almohad wars in the Iberian Peninsula
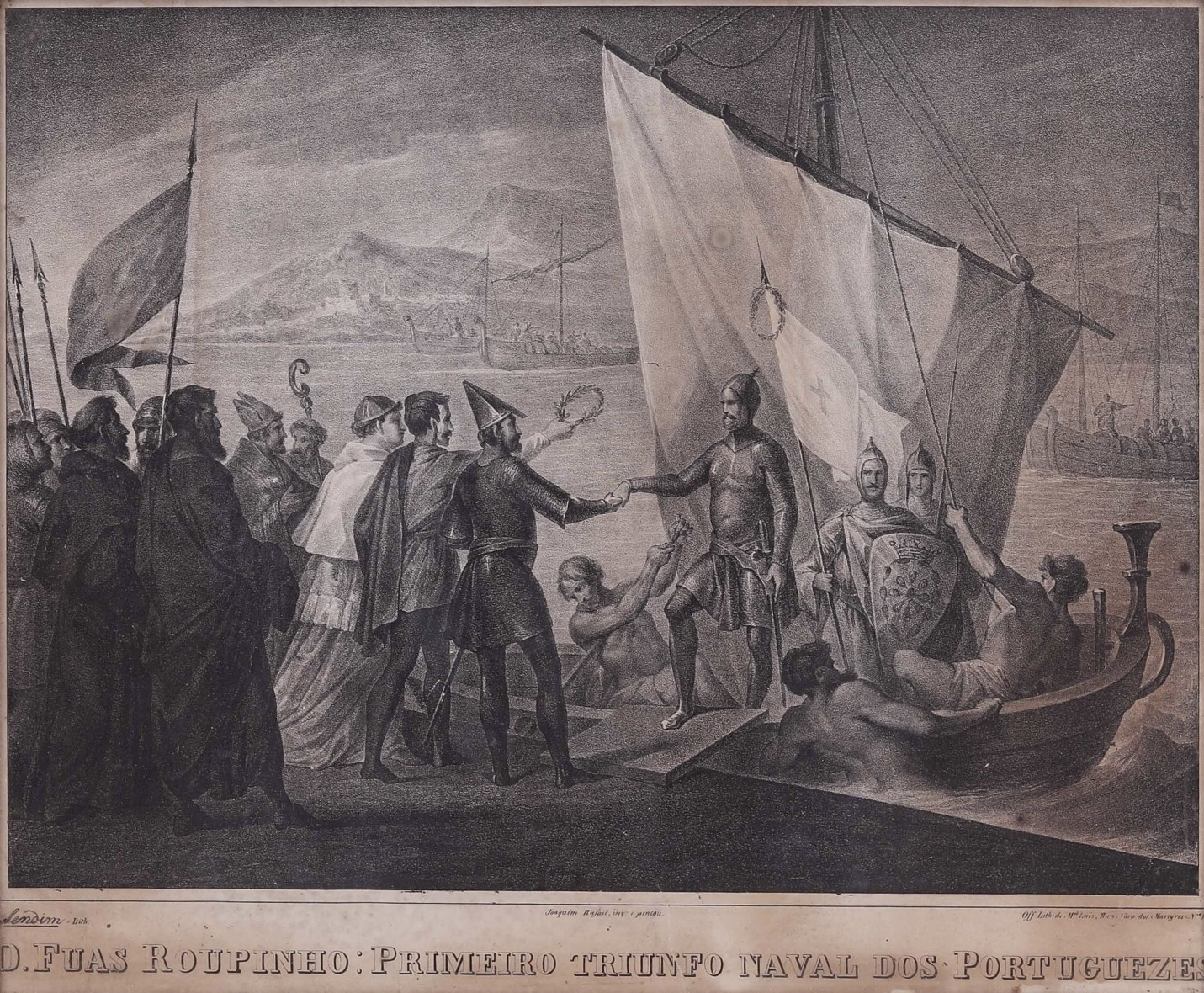
- "First Naval Triumph of the Portuguese" by Joaquim Rafael
Date	29 July 1180
Location	Cape Espichel, Atlantic Ocean
Result	Portuguese victory

Belligerents
Kingdom of Portugal	Almohad Caliphate

Commanders and leaders
Unknown	Gamin ben Mardanis †

Strength
9 vessels	10 galleys

Casualties and losses
Unknown	Several galleys captured Many dead

The Battle of Cape Espichel took place on 29 July 1180 between naval squadrons of Portugal and the Almohad Caliphate. The battle occurred at Cape Espichel on the Atlantic coast of Portugal and is considered to be the first naval battle in Portuguese history. The Portuguese defeated the Almohads, killing their admiral in the process and capturing several advanced Mediterranean galleys intact.

== Background ==
In the mid-12th Century, after Afonso I became king of Portugal, he didn't immediately create a formal navy as Portugal's military activities at that time were entirely land based. As a need for occasional sea patrols or transport arose, the services of privateers and merchants owning deep-water vessels would be enlisted by means of licensing agreements.

During those years and lasting until approximately 1170, the Almohads conducted very few maritime operations along Portugal's coastline as they were busy developing their ports and shipyards in North Africa and at Seville. To defend Portugal from potential attacks from the sea, Afonso relied upon land-based defenses composed of fortified outposts and cavalry units.

Beginning in the 1170s, however, the Almohads began to use their navy to conduct raids on the Portuguese coast. The operational approach utilized by the Almohads at that time was to sail past Portuguese land defenses; put raiding parties on shore; ravage the farming communities and settlements; take captives; and quickly depart. In 1179, the very same approach was used when the Almohads raided the settlements outside of Lisbon by means of an amphibious landing in conjunction with their northern land campaign to Abrantes.

In early 1180, when Portuguese spies observed and reported the naval activities and fleet preparations of the Almohads in Seville, Afonso used the power of his office to confiscate and press private commercial vessels into service on a temporary emergency basis. In response, Portuguese royal administrators immediately summoned master shipwrights and craftsmen to the shipyards in Lisbon and began the creation of a naval squadron to intercept and confront an impending Almohad raid. Private vessels were seized and the shipwrights hastily added temporary military features including rowing benches, raised wooden platforms for archers, and reinforced prows.

Shortly thereafter in the spring of 1180, the Almohad fleet, commanded by Admiral Gamim ben Mardanis, departed Seville and began an advance up the Portuguese coastline toward Lisbon. As the Almohads sailed north raiding settlements, the creation of a Portuguese naval squadron continued. Experienced sailors, taken from private fleets, were pressed into service as crew members on the modified warships. Also added to the on-board compliment of men were archers, land-based soldiers, and urban militia fighters from the Lisbon and Coimbra garrisons. The soldiers and militiamen were rapidly trained in naval boarding practices, a standard naval combat tactic of the era. The primary objective of warfare at sea in the era was to board the enemy's ship and then take control by means of hand-to-hand combat.

Contrary to folklore that was created around Dom Faus Roupinho, he was not present and did not participate in the Battle of Cape Espichel. Roupinho was never in command of the entire operation and was never given the title of “Admiral” by Afonso. At the beginning of the 17th Century, an influential Cistercian monk, Friar Bernardo de Brito, completed the codification of the Legend of Nazaré in a monumental national chronicle, Monarchia Lusitana. In that lengthy narrative, Brito attempted to make Roupinho a national hero and falsely rewrote the events associated with the Battle of Cape Espichel, claiming that the Almohads sailed north of Lisbon; landed at São Martinho do Porto; marched to Roupinho's castle at Porto de Mós; and were defeated by Roupinho by means of a nighttime sortie. The narrative also falsely claims that Roupinho later traveled to Lisbon where he directed the modification of merchant vessels into a naval squadron of nine warships over a two-week period.

Early historians including McMurdo (1888) and Livermore (1966) based their histories of the Battle of Cape Espichel exclusively on the English language translation of Brito's narrative as opposed to more modern historians including Mattoso (2014) and Picard (2000), who based their findings upon a cross-reference of independent sources including Arabic and Latin records and texts. Based upon their independent research, Mattoso and Picard flatly reject narratives that speak of an amphibious landing at São Martinho do Porto; a march and siege of the castle at Porto de Mós; or a victorious nighttime sortie conducted by Roupinho. Also rejected as false is the narrative that Roupinho organized and led the effort that created Portugal's first naval squadron.

After 2-2½ months of ravaging Portugal's Atlantic coastline, the Almohad squadron approached the Setúbal Peninsula, at which time the Portuguese naval squadron sailed out of Lisbon's harbor to intercept the raiders

== Battle ==
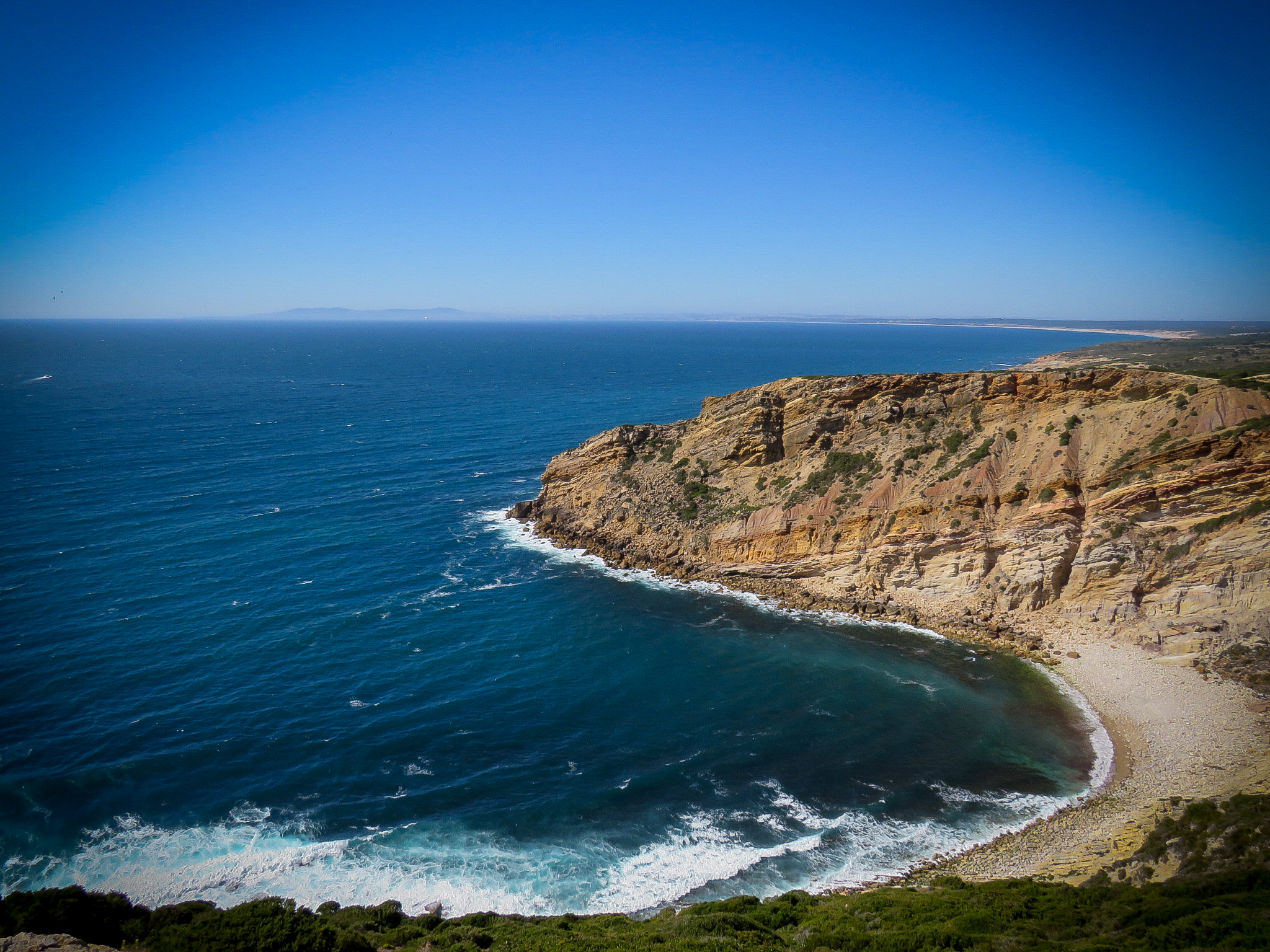
Cape Espichel.

On July 29, the two naval forces clashed. As the squadrons approached each other it would have appeared to be a fairly even fight with ten Almohad galleys and nine newly created Portuguese warships. The Almohad galleys were fully manned with highly trained and heavily armed soldiers. The Portuguese warships were fully manned as well with soldiers newly trained in boarding tactics, but otherwise well experienced in hand-to-hand combat.

The primary tactic of the Portuguese was to close the distance between the two squadrons as quickly as possible to negate the Almohad advantage in vessel size and experience. As such, rather than engage in a duel, based upon maneuvers, the Portuguese used their oars to achieve a high-speed sprint toward the Muslim fleet. The goal was to grapple and board the Almohads galleys as quickly as possible. The Portuguese also organized their attack by establishing small tactical pairs of warships and focusing two of their ships against one Almohad vessel. This gave the Portuguese a temporary advantage and helped them to capture individual Almohad galleys.

As the Portuguese closed in on the Almohad galleys, the pilots attempted to execute side-glancing sweeps, maneuvering their vessels down the flank of the enemy's ships, pulling their oars flat against their hull at the last moment. If the maneuver worked properly, the ship under attack would have had its extended oars sheered off and its deck pierced by the “spur” extension of the ramming ship's prow. At that point, the ships would be locked together; arrows and other projectiles would be fired down upon the enemy's deck; and the command to board would be issued. Once boarding took place, the warfare reverted to a melee of hand-to-hand combat.

In the course of the battle, the Almohad flagship was captured and the fleet commander, Admiral Gamim ben Mardanis, killed. With that loss, the tactical cohesion of the remaining Muslim vessels fell apart. The Almohad galleys that could maneuver their way free, fled. Captured vessels and those disabled were secured and taken into Portuguese custody.

The battle was over. The Portuguese victory was achieved by means of the aggressive posture that they took immediately upon intercepting the Almohad squadron and the skilled performance of their boarding parties in hand-to-hand combat. The Battle of Cape Espichel was a sweeping success for the Portuguese. The Portuguese didn't lose a single vessel while many of the Almohad galleys were either destroyed or captured intact.

== Aftermath ==
Immediately after the battle, the Portuguese squadron returned to Lisbon with the captured galleys as war prizes. The Portuguese considered the threat of addition Almohad raids over for the time being and returned the previously confiscated ships to their original owners as the kingdom did not have the resources to purchase, operate or maintain a state owned navy at that time. The oarsmen and sailors were allowed to return to their pre-warfare vocations.

The galleys captured intact from the Almohads were retained for a short while and studied. Portuguese ships of the day were designed primarily for merchant activities and featured heavy-timber hulls and square-rigs. The Almohad galleys featured narrow, low-slung hydrodynamic hulls, internal rowing-benches, and lateen sail rigs, all which aided to their maneuverability. After a period of examination, these galleys were sold to privateers and merchant fleet operators. When those galleys were conveyed to new owners, the special emergency naval force assembled by Afonso ceased to exist and Portugal reverted to its past practice of purchasing maritime services by means of licensing agreements.

In late 1180 or early 1181, Alfonso authorized a retributive raid on the Almohad naval port at Ceuta in North Africa. In this expedition, roughly 5 to 8 privately owned vessels licensed by the kingdom conducted a surprise off-season winter raid upon Almohad galleys sitting uncrewed in the dry docks at Ceuta. The Portuguese successfully destroyed several Almohad galleys; raided and plundered numerous naval warehouses; and then fled without encountering resistance from active Almohad galleys. Again a false narrative regarding the participation of Faus Roupinho in this retaliatory mission was created by the Cistercian Friar Brito. Brito claimed that Roupinho quickly organized a raid on Ceuta shortly after the Battle of Cape Espichel. Roupinho was the Crown's representative, responsible for the protection of strategic fortifications including Coimbra, Leiria and Porto de Mós; he did not participate in the Battle of Espichel; and he did not participate in the Ceuta raid of 1180 / 1181 as he did not have the skills to lead a naval taskforce from Lisbon through the Strait of Gibraltar to North Africa or to engage an Almohad fleet in a sea battle.

Three year later in June 1184, a squadron of approximately 20-30 Portuguese vessels attempting to disrupt Almohad supply lines associated with the Siege of Santarém were ambushed by the Almohads in a pincer movement. Two separate Almohad squadrons, one from Seville and another from Ceuta, formed an armada of 40 galleys and surprised the Portuguese squadron in the Atlantic corridor off of Silves in southern Portugal, capturing or destroying nearly the entire naval force.

Approximately three months later in September 1184, the Portuguese hastily attempted to conduct a retaliatory raid on the Almohad port of Ceuta. Utilizing approximately 21 privateer vessels, the Portuguese foolishly entered into a semi-enclosed inner harbor area and were immediately surrounded by an Almohad fleet of over 50 galleys. In the battle that occurred, the Almohads destroyed or captured 11 of the Portuguese vessels. Again the Cistercian Friar Brito created a false narrative regarding the participation of Faus Roupinho in this raid. Roupinho did not participate in the raid on the Almohad port of Ceuta in September 1184 and he did not die during the battle.

The loss of so many of the vessels in Portugal's privateer fleet during the sea battles in 1184 and the kingdom's reluctance to invest in a state owned navy significantly impacted Portugal's naval operations for decades. Without access to deep-water vessels, Portugal could not conduct independent naval campaigns either to defend its coast or of an offensive nature. Over time, Portugal was able to return to the practice of licensing private vessels, however, state investment in a navy would not occur until 1317. During a large portion of the 13th Century, Portugal's war against Muslims in al-Andrus would be conducted both on land and sea in conjunction with northern European Crusaders.

== Citations ==
- Brito, Bernardo de (1609). "Book 7, Chapters 3, 4, 12, 35, 36". Monarchia Lusitana: Parte Segunda (in Portuguese). Vol. 2. Lisbon: Mosteiro de S. Bernardo.
- Cressier, Patrice (2006). La maîtrise de l'eau en al-Andalus: paysages, pratiques et techniques (in French). Casa de Velázquez. ISBN 978-84-95555-69-4.
- Livermore, H. V. (1966). A New History of Portugal. Cambridge University Press. ISBN 978-0521095716.
- Mattoso, José (2014). D. Afonso Henriques (in Portuguese). Lisbon: Temas e Debates.
- McMurdo, Edward (1888). The History of Portugal: From the Commencement of the Monarchy to the Reign of Alfonso III. Sampson Low, Marston, Searle & Rivington.
- Monteiro, Armando da Silva Saturnino (1989). Batalhas e Combates da Marinha Portuguesa: Volume I (1139-1521) (in Portuguese). Lisbon: Livraria Sá da Costa Editora.
- Pervaiz, Christophe (2000). Le Portugal musulman (VIIIe-XIIIe siècle) (in French). Paris: Maisonneuve et Larose.
- Picard, Christophe (2000). Le Portugal musulman (VIIIe-XIIIe siècle): L'Occident d'al-Andalus sous domination islamique (in French). Paris: Maisonneuve et Larose.
- Quintella, Ignacio da Costa (1839). Annaes da Marinha Portugueza (in Portuguese). Vol. 1. Lisbon: Academia Real das Sciencias.
