= Luso-Leonese War (1167–1169) =

War between Leon and Portugal

Luso–Leonese War of 1167–1169
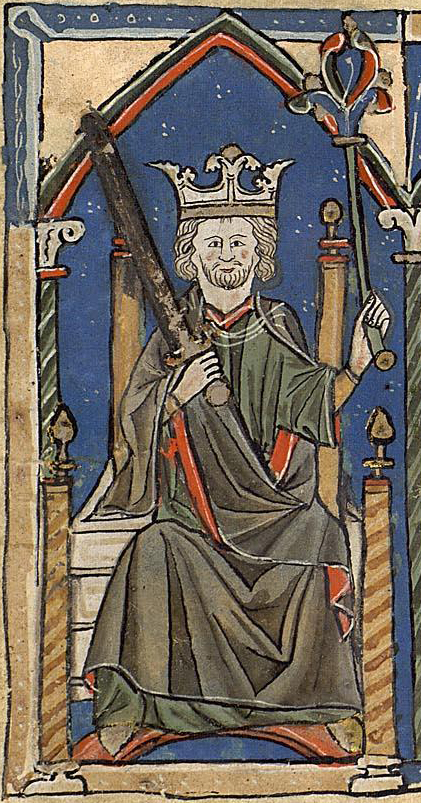
- Medieval painting of Ferdinand II of Leon
Date	1167–1169
Location	Iberian Peninsula
Result	Leonese victory
Territorial changes	Portugal loses all territories east of the Guadiana river All Portuguese territories conquered in Galicia are returned to Ferdinand II of Leon

Belligerents
Kingdom of Leon; Almohad Caliphate	Kingdom of Portugal

Commanders and leaders
Ferdinand II of Leon	Afonso I of Portugal (POW); Prince Sancho; Gerald the Fearless

The Luso–Leonese War of 1167–1169 was a military conflict fought between the Kingdom of León and the Kingdom of Portugal. This war began and ended within the framework of the Reconquista, where the Christian kingdoms expelled the numerous Muslim kingdoms from the Iberian Peninsula. The war started during the reigns of Ferdinand II of León and Afonso I of Portugal.

== Background ==
With the death of the king Sancho III of Castile in August 1158, Alfonso VIII, then still a two-year-old child, succeeded him on the throne, a circumstance that left the kingdom vulnerable to the ambitions of King Ferdinand II of León. In December 1160, Ferdinand II of Leon met with Afonso I of Portugal in Celanova and this meeting seems to have resulted in a pact or alliance between the two monarchs, through the marriage of the king of León with Afonso's daughter, which guaranteed the Leonese king security on his western border while he took care of Castilian issues in the east.

The pact did not last long due to the founding in 1160 of Ciudad Rodrigo, on the Portuguese border, by Ferdinand II. The settlers proved to be bad neighbors and unscrupulous not only towards the neighboring Leonese cities but also towards the Portuguese, whose borders were disrespected, villages were robbed and lands usurped. The cities of Salamanca and Ávila protested to Ferdinand II and even revolted, but the rebellion was suppressed by the king in 1162.

A new war between Portugal and León raged from 1162 to 1165 and in 1167 hostilities between the two kingdoms reignited again.

== War ==
=== Western Leon ===
Following the declaration of war on the Kingdom of León by the Kingdom of Portugal, Portuguese forces led by prince-heir Sancho made an incursion into Leonese territory, specifically into the recently founded city of Ciudad Rodrigo. However, they were defeated in Argañín (near Ciudad Rodrigo) and many Portuguese soldiers were taken as prisoners of war. Sancho managed to escape from the combat zone but was unable to rescue many of his men, who remained in captivity. The King of Leon, Ferdinand II, freed the Portuguese prisoners, but did not sign a peace treaty with the Kingdom of Portugal. Afonso I, not content with this, decided to start a second campaign, this time in Galicia.

=== Galicia ===
The Portuguese king then approached the Galician border personally with his army and began the offensive. The city of Tuy was taken and they vandalized their cathedral. From Tuy, the Portuguese king moved on to the territories of Turonio and Limia, which were occupied. A siege was imposed on the castle of Sandino, property of the monks of Celanova, but a violent storm hit the Portuguese forces causing military operations to be cancelled. The monks of Celanova attributed this event to the intervention of Saint Rudesind, their patron saint.

A castle was quickly built at Cedofeita, near Celanova. Meanwhile, further south, in the spring of 1169 Gerald the Fearless, a famous leader who conquered Muslim castles on the border with the Moorish taifas, besieged the city of Badajoz. However, he did not have enough soldiers to continue the attack, so he asked Afonso for help, probably while he was still in Galicia. After installing garrisons in the new conquests, Afonso I of Portugal withdrew to the south. The castle of Cedofeita was quickly attacked by Ferdinand II and, when lightning struck the main tower, the garrison surrendered.

=== Badajoz ===
The city of Badajoz was one of the most important Almohad fortresses in al-Andalus. Due to constant attacks and internal conflicts, the surrounding areas of Badajoz were depopulated. The inhabitants of Badajoz paid parias (tribute) to the King of León in exchange for protection, and it was stipulated between Afonso I of Portugal and Ferdinand II that the conquest of the city would remain in the hands of Leon.

While Ferdinand was fighting in Galicia to recover the castles and territories occupied by the Portuguese, Afonso arrived at the front of Badajoz with his troops. The Muslim defenders of Badajoz were trapped in the citadel, however, they ended up being rescued by the king of León, to whom they had asked for help. The Leonese king began to besiege the Portuguese besiegers and, when Afonso tried to pass through the city gate with his men, on horseback, he broke his leg when he hit one of the bolts, being later captured by the Leonese, in Caia e São Pedro. The capture of the Portuguese king was decisive and put an end to hostilities.

== Aftermath ==
Ferdinand treated Afonso with courtesy but, nevertheless, Afonso was forced to return all the territories conquered in Galicia and east of the Guadiana and had to pay a large amount of money. Gerald the Fearless, in turn, returned to Juromenha while the Muslim governor of Badajoz again took full possession of his city.

Although he spent some time recovering in the Termas de São Pedro do Sul, Afonso I was never able to ride a horse again. He died in 1185 and was succeeded by Sancho I of Portugal in the same year.

== Bibliography ==
- Livermore, H. V. (1947). A History Of Portugal. CUP Archive.
- McMurdo, Edward (1888). The History of Portugal: From the Commencement of the Monarchy to the Reign of Alfonso III. S. Low, Marston, Searle, & Rivington.
- Gómez, Miguel; Lincoln, Kyle C.; Smith, Damian J. (2 April 2019). King Alfonso VIII of Castile: Government, Family, and War. Fordham University Press. ISBN 978-0-8232-8416-0.
- Wheeler, B.; Parsons, John C. (30 April 2016). Eleanor of Aquitaine: Lord and Lady. Springer. ISBN 978-1-137-05262-9.
- Stephens, H. Morse (13 August 2020). The Story of the Nations: Portugal. BoD – Books on Demand. ISBN 978-3-7524-2952-7.
- Iglesias, José Luis Sánchez (2003). Salamanca y su alfoz en la Edad Media: Siglos XII y XIII. Diputación de Salamanca. ISBN 978-84-7797-199-3.
- V. V. A. A. (29 January 2013). Mundos medievales: Espacios, sociedades y poder : Homenaje al Profesor José Ángel García de Cortázar y Ruiz de Aguirre. University of Cantabria. ISBN 978-84-8102-650-4.
- Guthrie (1774). Allgemeine Weltgeschichte von der Schöpfung an bis auf gegenwärtige Zeit: Welche alle bekannte Reiche und Staaten, ihre Veränderungen, Staatsverfassungen, Gesetze, Religionen, Sitten und Gebräuche ... In sich begreift.
- Stephens, H. Morse (19 May 2021). The Story of the Nations: Portugal: Unveiling Portugal's Rich Historical Tapestry.
- Álvarez Palenzuela, Vicente A.; Fernández, Luis Suárez (1991). Historia de España: La España musulmana y los inicios de los reinos cristianos (711-1157). 5. Gredos. ISBN 978-84-249-1013-6.
- Herrera, Juan Cabezas de (1895). El gran ladrón [Alonso de Monroy]: Apuntes para la historia.
- Freire, Anselmo Braamcamp (1921). Brasões da Sala de Sintra.
- Alvarez, Manuel Lucas (1993). El Reino de León en la Alta Edad Media: Las cancillerías reales (1109-1230) (in Spanish and Latin). Centro de Estudios e Investigación "San Isidoro". ISBN 978-84-00-06869-1.
- Beck, Lauren (13 May 2019). Illustrating el Cid, 1498 to Today. McGill-Queen's Press - MQUP. ISBN 978-0-7735-5761-1.
- Carroll, Warren Hasty (1993). The Glory of Christendom. Christendom Press. ISBN 978-0-931888-54-0.
- Itinerario cultural de Almorávides y Almohades: Magreb y Península Ibérica (in Spanish). Legado Andalusí. 1999. ISBN 9788493061500.
- Martínez Martínez, Matías R. (2005). Historia del Reino de Badajoz durante la dominación musulmana. Editorial MAXTOR. ISBN 978-84-9761-188-6.
- Opello Jr, Walter C. (5 July 2019). Portugal's Political Development: A Comparative Approach. Routledge. ISBN 978-1-000-30778-8.
- Stephens, H. Morse (25 September 2017). A Short History of Portugal. Serapis Classics. ISBN 978-3-96255-590-0.
- Manjunath.R (3 July 2021). Timelines of Nearly Everything. Manjunath.R.
- O'Callaghan, Joseph F. (12 November 2013). A History of Medieval Spain. Cornell University Press. ISBN 978-0-8014-6871-1.
- Lafuente, Juan Hernández (February 1962). Reseña estadística de la Provincia de Badajoz (in Spanish). Madrid.
- Lomax, Derek W. (1978). The Reconquest of Spain. Longman. ISBN 978-0-582-50209-3.
- Disney, Anthony R. (13 April 2009). A History of Portugal and the Portuguese Empire: From Beginnings to 1807. Cambridge University Press. ISBN 978-0-521-84318-8.
- Queiroz, Odaléia T. M. M.; Portuguez, Anderson P.; Seabra, Giovanni; De Moraes, Clauciana S. B. (20 May 2018). A Natureza e O Patrimônio Na Produção do Lugar Turístico (in Portuguese). Clube de Autores. ISBN 978-85-68066-28-7.
- Jensen, Kurt Villads (14 October 2016). Crusading at the Edges of Europe: Denmark and Portugal c.1000 – c.1250. Taylor & Francis. ISBN 978-1-317-15670-3.
- Magill, Frank N. (12 November 2012). The Middle Ages: Dictionary of World Biography, Volume 2. Routledge. ISBN 978-1-136-59313-0.
