= Battle of Alcácer do Sal (1161) =

Battle of Alcácer do Sal

- Part of the Portuguese Reconquista
Date	1161
Location	Alcácer do Sal
Result	Almohad victory

Belligerents
Kingdom of Portugal	Almohads

Commanders and leaders
Afonso I of Portugal	Abu Mohammed Abdallah Ben Hafs

Strength
Unknown	Unknown

Casualties and losses
6,000 killed Large number of prisoners	Unknown

The Battle of Alcácer do Sal in 1161 was an military encounter between the troops of King Afonso I of Portugal and the Almohads commanded by Abu Mohammed Abdallah Ben Hafs.

== Background ==
After Afonso (or Ibn Errik as he was referred to in the Muslim chronicles) captured Santarém and Lisbon in 1147, he set his sights on invading south of the Tagus River into the Alentejo region. Key to entry into Alentejo was the fortress and port city of Alcácer do Sal, which served as a major commerce center and supported Muslim military operations along the Atlantic coast. Afonso first attempted to capture Alcácer do Sal in 1151, but failed. He tried again in 1154 and 1157 and failed again in both attempts. Finally in April 1158 after a 60-day siege, Afonso captured Alcácer do Sal.

After conquering the eastern Maghreb in 1160, the Almohad caliph Abd al-Mu'min decided to intervene in the Iberian peninsula to unite the Muslim states under his authority, by force if necessary, and halt the advance of the Christian kingdoms. At the outset, Abd al-Mu'min ordered the Wali of Granada to restore and improve the fortifications of Gibraltar. Once this work was completed, Abd al-Mu'min crossed the Strait of Gibraltar at the head of a large army of 18,000 men and settled in the city.

Informed of the conquests of Afonso, Abd al-Mu'min sent a detachment west under the command of Abu Mohammed Abdallah Ben Hafs (referred to as Benafece by the Portuguese) to recover lost territory and cities.

== The battle and aftermath ==
When the Almohads approached Alcácer do Sal, Afonso summoned his troops and took to the field to confront the invaders. In the pitched battle that ensued, however, the Portuguese were outnumbered and ultimately defeated. In total, more than 6,000 Portuguese died and a large number captured. Although the Portuguese suffered a devastating defeat in the field, ibn Hafs did not storm Alcácer do Sal, but rather withdrew his forces without capturing the city, allowing the Portuguese to maintain the fortress as a strategic stronghold. Lost to the Portuguese, however, were a large number of settlements they had recently conquered in Alentejo including the town of Beja.

In December 1162, after Abd al-Mu'min returned to North Africa, the Portuguese resumed the war against the Muslims of Andalus, beginning with an attack by the Santarém militia against Beja.

== See also ==
- Almohad wars in the Iberian Peninsula
