= Luso-Leonese War (1162–1165) =

War between Portugal and Leon

Luso–Leonese War (1162–1165)
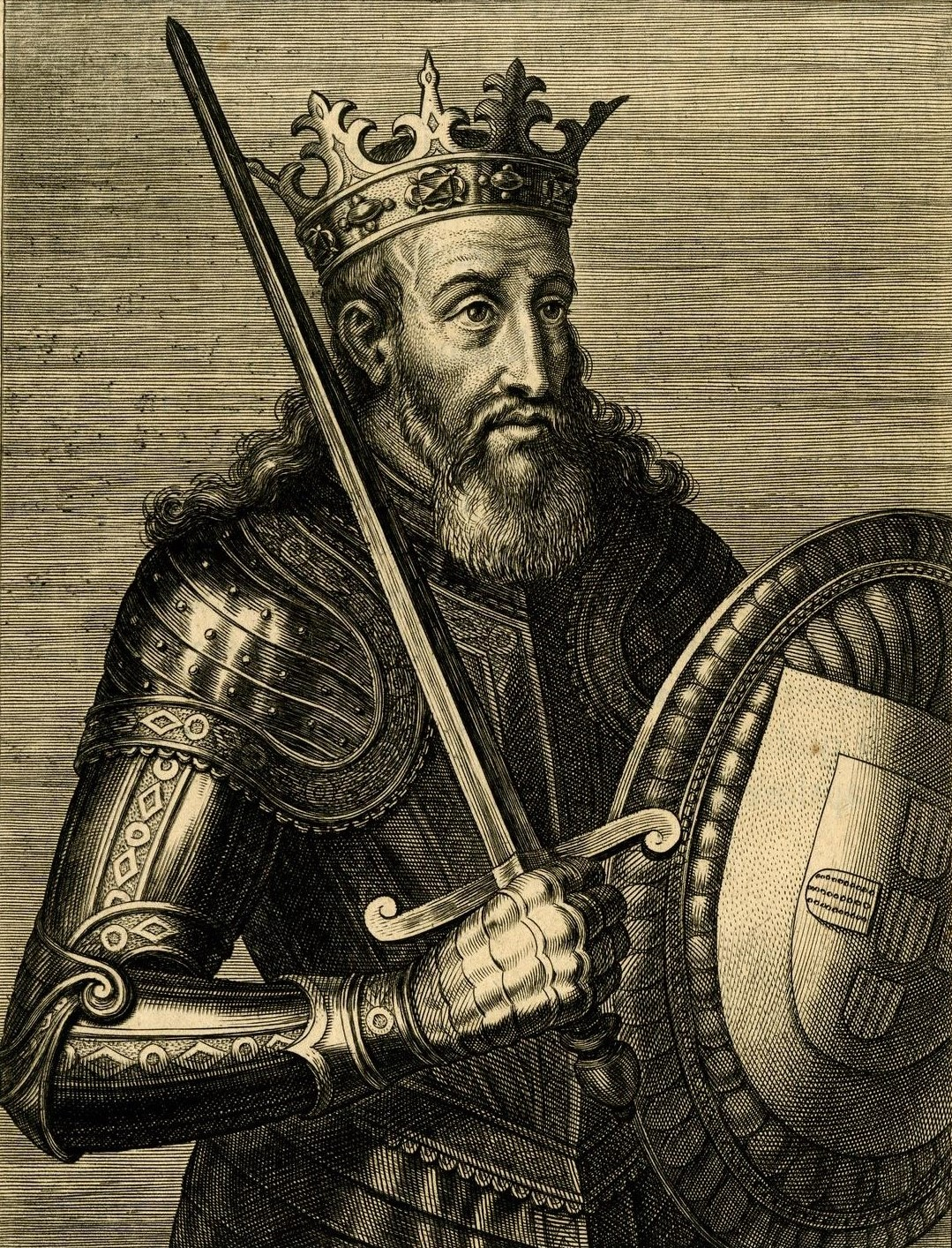
- Portrait of Afonso I, King of Portugal
Date	1162–1165
Location	Galicia and western Castile and Leon, Kingdom of León
Result	Portuguese victory
Territorial changes	Turonio and Limia annexed to Portugal

Belligerents
Kingdom of Portugal	Kingdom of León

Commanders and leaders
Afonso I of Portugal	Ferdinand II of León

The Luso-Leonese War took place from 1162 to 1165. It was a conflict between Portugal and the Kingdom of León. It was due to disputes between Afonso Henriques and King Ferdinand II of León, who interfered in Portuguese foreign policy.

== Background ==
After the death of Emperor Alfonso VII of León in 1157, his domains were divided between his sons Sancho III, who remained with Castile, and Ferdinand II, who was left with León. Through the Treaty of Sahagún, the two brothers agreed to divide Portugal among themselves if the opportunity arose, but when Sancho III died shortly afterwards, Afonso I declared war on León in 1158.

During hostilities, the Portuguese king signed an alliance with Aragon. His daughter, Mafalda, would marry the heir of Aragon Alfonso, son of Queen Petronilla of Aragon and Count Ramon Berenguer IV, who had proposed the pact. Peace was sealed with Leon at the end of 1160.

The foundation of Ciudad Rodrigo by Ferdinand II, in 1160, caused disturbances in the region and, in neighboring Salamanca, a revolt of its knights broke out. They were joined by the Castilian knights from Ávila and the Leonese knights from Zamora but were, however, all destroyed in the Battle of Valmuza, near Salvatierra de Tormes.

In the summer of 1162, the Count of Barcelona died. Ferdinand II then managed to get Queen Petronila to annul the marriage agreement between his son and Afonso Henriques' daughter.

== War ==
Afonso Henriques took possession of the Limia region (in Galicia) in 1162. In December of this year, the king provided weapons to all the residents, knights and peons of Mós, a village near the border with Leon to which he granted a charter, so that they could defend his castle.

In Castile, internal struggles continued between the Laras and Castros for dominance over their young king, disputes in which the king of León was involved. Unsatisfied with their defeat, in January 1163 the knights of Salamanca reignited the revolt and asked Afonso I for help. Having received the request for help, Afonso I advanced to Salamanca in the same month and took possession of it.

The following summer, the Leonese king defeated the Portuguese in the Battle of Campos de Arganara and forced them to withdraw from Salamanca. Returning to Portugal, Afonso I granted charters to Trancoso, Marialva, Aguiar da Beira, Celorico da Beira, and Moreira do Rei. His defeat in Salamanca led him to focus more on the safety of his eastern border, which depended more about the connection of people and knights to that land than the fate of weapons on the battlefield.

Expelled from Salamanca, in the spring of 1165 the Portuguese king marched again on Galicia, occupied Turonio and conquered the Castle of Cedofeita, near Pontevedra. From Cedofeita, he raided Pontevedra, Ribadavia and Ourense.

King Ferdinand II met again with Afonso I in Pontevedra and in May 1165 they signed peace.

== Aftermath ==
In exchange for peace, Ferdinand II committed to marrying Urraca of Portugal, daughter of Afonso I, despite the canonical impediment that made the marriage prohibited by the Catholic Church, as they had the same great-grandfather. From this marriage the future king Afonso IX of León was born.

The border territories of Limia and Turonio were annexed to Portugal but would not remain in the possession of Afonso Henriques for long. Like the previous peace, this one would not last long and hostilities between Portugal and León would be renewed just two years later.

== Bibliography ==
- Mattoso, José (2006). D. Afonso Henriques. Círculo de Leitores. ISBN 978-972-759-911-0.
- Pita, Isabel Beceiro (2018-09-20). La espiritualidad y la configuración de los reinos ibéricos (Siglos XII-XV) (in Spanish). Dykinson. ISBN 978-84-9148-856-9.
- Verrié, Jordi (1847). Programa y curso elemental de historia de la Edad Media correspondiente al tercer año de la segunda enseñanza (in Spanish).
- Ruiz, Enrique Martínez (January 2000). Atlas histórico de España. Ediciones AKAL. ISBN 978-84-7090-349-6.
- Linehan, Peter (2009). España, 1157-1300 : Una sociedad desorganizada por la guerra. Grupo Planeta (GBS). ISBN 978-84-7423-933-1.
- Jamieson, Frances (1820). The History of Spain, from the Earliest Ages ... To the Return of Ferdinand VII. In 1814.
- Arteta, Antonio Ubieto (1981). Historia de Aragón: Creación y desarrollo de la Corona de Aragón. Anubar. ISBN 978-84-7013-227-8.
- Álvarez Palenzuela, Vicente A. (2005). Edad Media: Historia de España. Editorial Ariel. ISBN 978-84-344-6793-4.
- Livermore, H. V. (2 January 1966). A New History of Portugal.
- Livermore, H. V. (1947). A History Of Portugal. CUP Archive.
- Stephens, H. Morse (13 August 2020). The Story of the Nations: Portugal. BoD – Books on Demand. ISBN 978-3-7524-2952-7.
- Iglesias, José Luis Sánchez (2003). Salamanca y su alfoz en la Edad Media: Siglos XII y XIII. Diputación de Salamanca. ISBN 978-84-7797-199-3.
- Forster, John; Gayangos, Pascual de (27 February 2024). The Chronicle of James I., King of Aragon, Surnamed the Conqueror (Written by Himself): Vol. I. BoD – Books on Demand. ISBN 978-3-385-35170-7.
- Mattoso, José (2014). D. Afonso Henriques (in Portuguese). Lisbon: Temas e Debates. ISBN 978-972-759-911-0.
- Saraiva, José H. (1983). História de Portugal (in Portuguese). Vol. 3. University of California: Publicações Alfa.
- Álvarez, Juan Carlos Cádiz (24 December 2018). Los siglos oscuros. Ediciones Nóbel, S.A. ISBN 978-84-16093-14-4.
- Villar y Macias, M. (1887). Historia de Salamanca (in Spanish). Imprenta de Francisco Nuñez Izquierdo.
- Boletin de la Real Academia de la Historia. TOMO CXCIV. NUMERO III. AÑO 1997 (in Spanish). Royal Academy of History. 1997.
- de Arvizu, Fernando (2 July 2008). El reino de León en la alta Edad media: La monarquía (1109-1230). IV (in Spanish). Centro de Estudios e Investigación "San Isidoro". ISBN 9788487667084.
- Corral, Fernando Luis; Viso, Iñaki Martín; Díaz, Pablo de la Cruz (January 2013). El historiador y la sociedad: Homenaje al profesor José Ma. Mínguez. Ediciones Universidad de Salamanca. ISBN 978-84-9012-147-4.
- Rionda, Ramón (May 2015). La Sorprendente Genealogía de Mis Tatarabuelos (in Spanish). Palibrio. ISBN 978-1-5065-0137-6.
- Guthrie (1774). Allgemeine Weltgeschichte von der Schöpfung an bis auf gegenwärtige Zeit: Welche alle bekannte Reiche und Staaten, ihre Veränderungen, Staatsverfassungen, Gesetze, Religionen, Sitten und Gebräuche ... In sich begreift (in German).
- Freire, Anselmo Braamcamp (1921). Brasões da Sala de Sintra (in Portuguese).
