= Siege of Abrantes =

Part of the Reconquista in 1179

Siege of Abrantes (1179)
- Part of the Reconquista
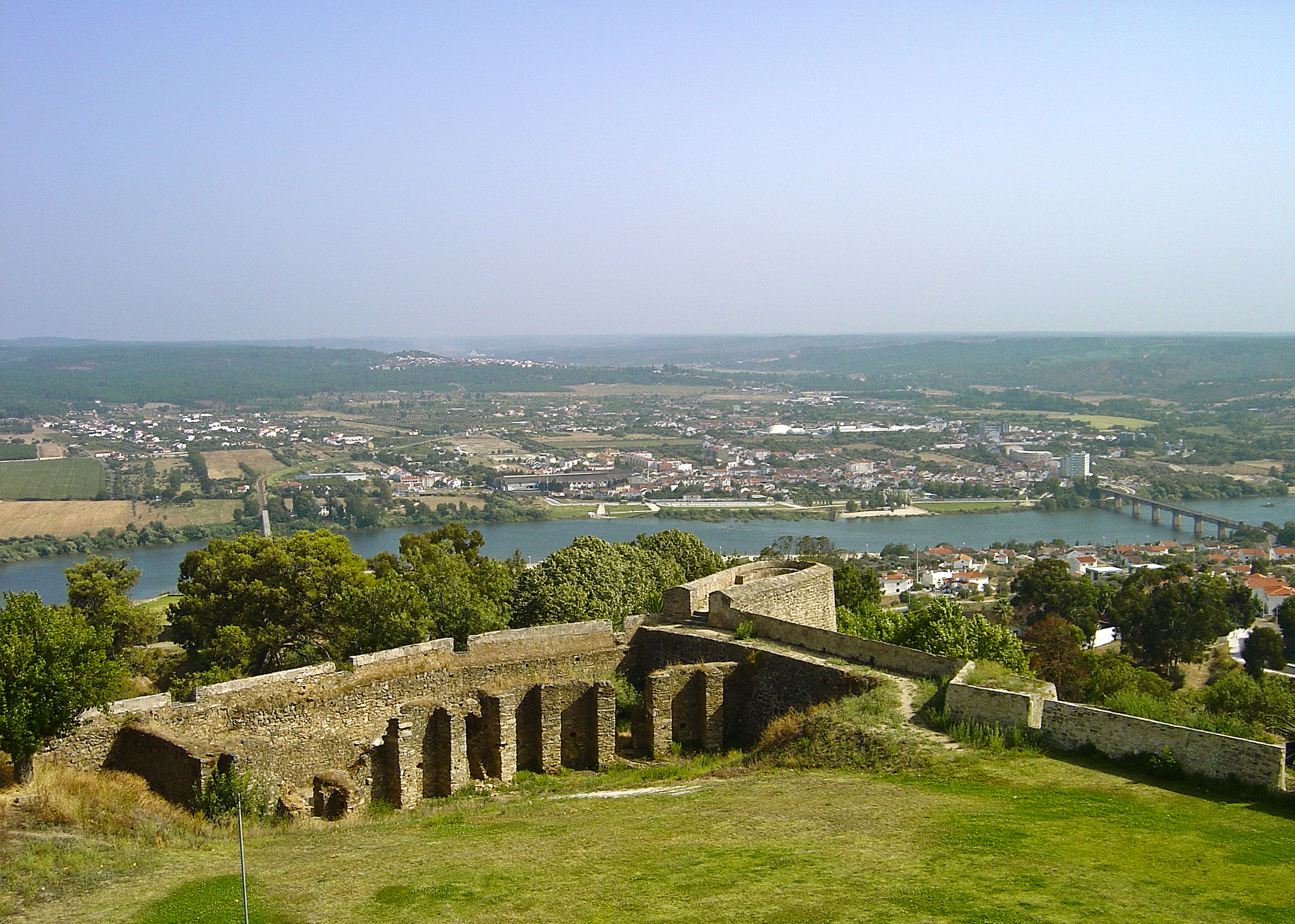
- Abrantes, Portugal
Date	October 1179
Location	Abrantes, Kingdom of Portugal
Result	Portuguese victory

Belligerents
Kingdom of Portugal	Almohad Caliphate

Commanders and leaders
Unknown	Abu Ishaq Ibrahim

Strength
Unknown	Unknown

Casualties and losses
Unknown	Large number of casualties

The Siege of Abrantes was the unsuccessful attempt by the Almohads to capture the Portuguese river crossing and fortress at Abrantes in 1179. The military expedition to Abrantes was the critical part of an Almohad campaign launched that year to retaliate for the Portuguese raid to Triana the previous year.

== Background ==
After Prince Sancho of Portugal completed the highly successful Triana Raid in 1178, the Almohads sought to retaliate by conducting military initiatives designed to destabilize the Portuguese frontier. They were conducted over a three year period spanning 1179-1181. The siege of Abrantes was part of an offensive that took place in the first year of the three year period.

The 1179 strike was an attempt to raid the Kingdom of Portugal, cross the Tagus River, and reach a location where they might threaten the Portuguese heartland and capital, Coimbra. To accomplish their goal, the Almohads sent their main force, the Army of the East, led by Abu Ishaq Ibrahim, Governor of Seville and son of the Almohad Caliph, Abu Yaqub Yusuf to Abrantes.

Abrantes was likely selected as the point at which the Almohads would attempt to cross the Tagus based upon the characteristics of the river and the defensive fortifications to be overcome. Downstream from Abrantes, the Portuguese fortifications at Santarém and Lisbon were formidable and the river more difficult to cross. At Abrantes, the defensive compound consisted of a walled city with a central castle on a hilltop. At Abrantes, the Tagus river was not as broad as compared to its width downstream and only chest-deep at places making it potentially fordable.

To aid the attack at Abrantes, Abu Ishaq dispatched cavalry detachments to simultaneously strike targets in the Tagus Valley including strategic gateway cities to Lisbon like Almada and Palmela. The objective of the Almohad cavalry strikes was to attack outlying Portuguese settlements in an attempt to cause disruption and destroy resources and food supplies. At Lisbon, an Almohad fleet commanded by Admiral Gamir ben Jami put Jund soldiers and naval infantry units on shore to attack the outskirts of the city and destroy farms, orchards, and food stocks. Moored naval vessels and shipyards at Lisbon were also targeted in an attempt to cripple the growing Portuguese navy. The attack on the cities and settlements in the Tagus Valley was also designed to pin Portuguese forces in place and prevent them from sending either their elite troops or local garrisons as reinforcements to Abrantes.

== Siege of Abrantes ==
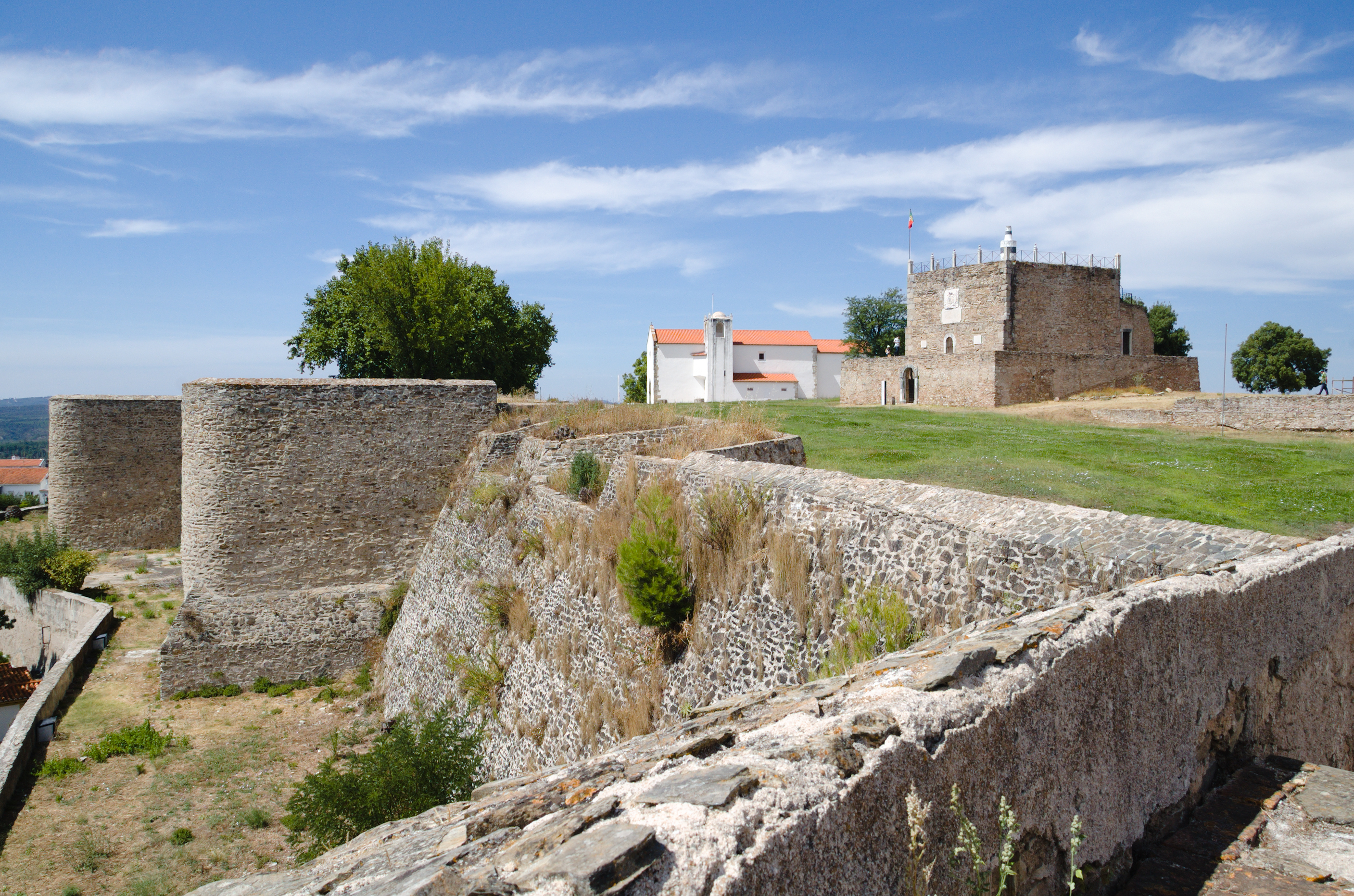
Castle of Abrantes.

Upon reaching the south bank of the Tagus River opposite Abrantes, it is believed that Abu Ishaq and the Almohads tried to get forces across the river by sending detachments across at fords and by attempting to fight their way over the bridged crossing protected by the Abrantes fortress.

Small detachments might have been able to cross at fords with materials designed to build and equip siege engines which could be used to attack the walled city and fortress from the north side of the river. It was essential, however, that the Almohads capture the heavily guarded river crossing in order to provide a secure passageway for the full army with all its materials.

Nevertheless, in all attempts to cross the river and secure a defensible perimeter on the north side of the Tagus River, the Almohads were unsuccessful. If river crossings were attempted at fords there is no mention of successful operations. At the guarded river crossing, the Almohads were turned back by defenders including archers and arbalists raining arrows and quarrels down upon them from the elevated position of the castle within the walled city.

As a result, the Almohads were forced to retreat back to the south bank of the river. Since the Almohads never established themselves on the north side of the river, the walled city was never fully surrounded and remained open to Portuguese reinforcements and supplies from Santarém or Coimbra. Unable to capture the bridge, the Almohads were stuck on the south bank of the Tagus River. They had no other alternatives as they had not brought the equipment or materials necessary to build a temporary bridge nor adequate flat-bottomed barges to support an amphibious operation.

To further compound their problems, the Almohads had arrived at Abrantes without an adequate supply chain. Apparently, Abu Ishaq hadn’t expected to be delayed at Abrantes. As his army traveled through Portuguese territory from Seville, they had seemingly provided for their needs by means of foraging and plunder. As a result, the Almohads had not created a full and complete logistical supply chain. The impact of such an operation was that when the raid stalled, the sources of food quickly deteriorated.

As the days of the attack on Abrantes progressed, Almohad food supplies dwindled and casualties mounted. In addition, reports were received that Portuguese reinforcements from Santarém were on their way to aid in the defense of the walled fortress and river crossing. Given these prospects, Abu Ishaq made the decision to take his army and retreat back to Seville. The attack was called off after just four days.

The Almohad campaign had failed due in large part to their poor planning and underestimation of Portuguese military strength.

== Aftermath ==
The Almohad retaliation campaign of 1179 was a major failure. The Almohads had failed to capture the Tagus River crossing at Abrantes and threaten the Portuguese heartland. They expended considerable resources and suffered a large number of casualties.

The Portuguese didn’t permanently lose any important strongholds. Some resources were lost, however, Portuguese casualties were relatively low, as they primarily fought from defensive positions protected by fortifications. As opposed to being weakened by the Almohad raid, Portugal continued to grow in strength. During 1179, Portugal remained at peace with the other Christian polities of al-Andalus, relocated Christian settlers to their frontiers, and were recognized by the Manifestis Probatum of Pope Alexander III as an independent sovereign Kingdom.

Although the Almohads were unsuccessful with their attack on Abrantes in 1179, they would continue their attempt to retaliate for the Triana Raid. In 1180, the Almohads successfully captured and destroyed the Portuguese border settlement of Coruche with its modest castle. The city was left in ruins but was rebuilt within two years as the Portuguese regained control of the area. Also in 1180, the Almohads attempted to attack Lisbon again using its navy to put infantry units on shore. The Portuguese navy, however, intercepted the transports and defeated the Almohads at the Battle of Cape Espichel.

== See also ==
- Military history of Portugal
- Portugal in the Middle Ages
- Almohad wars in the Iberian Peninsula
