= Gerald the Fearless =

Portuguese warrior

Geraldo Geraldes
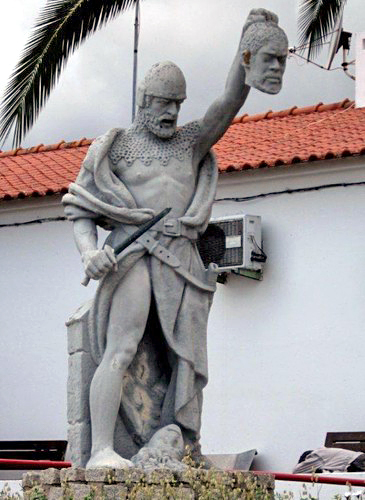
- Statue of Geraldo the Fearless in Évora, decapitating a Moor.
- Born: unknown
- Died: c. 1173; Ceuta
- Occupation: knight
- Known for: Conquest of Évora

Geraldo Geraldes (died c. 1173), known as Geraldo the Fearless (Portuguese: Geraldo, o Sem Pavor, lit. 'Gerald, the one without fear'), was a Portuguese warrior and folk hero of the Reconquista whose theatre of operations was in the barren Alentejo and Extremadura regions of the lower Guadiana river. The city of Évora was the most lasting of his conquests and was never retaken. His success and independence have suggested parallels with the Castilian hero El Cid and Gerald has been called "the Cid of Portugal".

== Reconquista in Alentejo and Extremadura ==
Around 1162 Gerald assembled a private army (a mesnada) and rapidly developed tactics that proved remarkably successful in seizing Muslim strongholds, though it was not adapted for siege warfare. He "perfected techniques of nocturnal surprise in wintry or stormy weather, stealthy escalading of walls by picked commando-like troops, cutting down of sentries and opening of town gates to the larger force stationed without." Among the primary sources for Gerald's methods the most important is the contemporary Arabic chronicler Ibn Ṣāḥib al-Ṣalā, whose Al-Mann bil-Imāma was incorporated into the history of al-Maqqarī in the seventeenth century. His opinion of Gerald and his tactics is very low:

The dog [Gerald] marched on rainy and very dark nights, with strong wind and snow, towards the cities and, having prepared his wooden instruments of scaling [walls] very large, so that they would surpass the wall of the city, he would apply those ladders to the side of the tower and catch the sentinel [by surprise] and say to him: "Shout, as is your custom," in order that the people would not hear him. When the scaling of the group had been completed on the highest wall in the city, they shouted in their language with an abominable screech, and they entered the city and fought whom they found and robbed them and captured all who were there in [the city, taking] captive and prisoner all who were there.

Of the places Gerald conquered the primary sources are in general agreement, also as to the order of their seizure, but as to the dating of events there is ambiguity. Ibn Ṣāḥib's version goes:

In the second Jumada I [15 April–13 May] of the anno Hegirae 560 [1165] the city of Trujillo was surprised, and in Dhu'l-Qa'da the notable village of Évora. Also was the population of Cáceres in Safar 561 [1166], and the castle of Montánchez in Jumada II and the strongholds of Serpa and Juromenha.

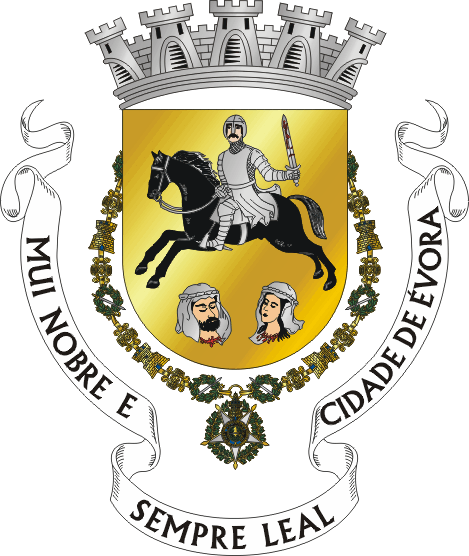

The city of Évora honours Gerald with a place on its coat-of-arms. The central plaza, the Praça do Giraldo, is also named after him.

The years 560 and 561 correspond roughly to the annos Domini 1165 and 1166, but here Ibn Ṣāḥib is almost certainly off in his dating by a year. The events rather took place in 1164 and 1165. A later Portuguese chronicle, the Crónica dos Godos ("Chronicle of the Goths"), dates the conquest of Évora to the year 1204 of the Spanish era, that is, 1166. Trujillo was taken on 14 May 1164, or in June; Évora in September 1164; and Cáceres in December 1164 or, on a later dating, in September 1166. These were the major conquests. The lesser conquests of Montánchez, Serpa, and Juromenha took place in 1165, based on Ibn Ṣāḥib's scheme, but Montánchez and Serpa may have gone in March 1167, as one historian has it. All the primary sources agree that Santa Cruz de la Sierra was the last of Gerald's successes, which may place it as late as 1169, though perhaps earlier (1167/8), along with Ureña. The conquest of these last two places left Gerald in a position to harass Beja. The date of the capture of Monfragüe, which was certainly one of his conquests, cannot be established.

== Siege of Badajoz ==
So successful was Gerald by 1168 that his eastward expansion threatened the southward expansion of the Kingdom of León. These actions were in violation of the succession arrangements laid down by Alfonso VII at Sahagún, since they comprised lands whose conquest had been assigned to León. A few of Gerald's conquests in the far east had even been assigned to Castile. The Leonese king, Ferdinand II, son of Alfonso VII, took action immediately after the taking of Cáceres, probably early in the spring of 1166, capturing Alcántara later that year and thus securing a crossing over the Tagus. Subsequently he allied with the Almohad caliph Yusuf I, who had warned him of Gerald and the Portuguese's encroachments on his interests.

In the early summer of 1169, Gerald assaulted Badajoz with his men and broke into the city streets, but the garrison took refuge in the high citadel, the alcazaba, the siege of which continued. Seeing an opportunity to add to his domains the chief city of the region at the expense of both his Muslim and Christian enemies, Afonso I of Portugal came with an army to Badajoz to relieve his nominal vassal. This provoked the opposition of Ferdinand of León, who claimed Badajoz as his own and came south with an army at the request of Yusuf, who had already sent a contingent of 500 cavalry to assist the garrison. The besieging Portuguese were themselves besieged by the Leonese and fighting broke out in the streets. While trying to flee, Afonso was caught on the hinge of a gate and flung from his horse, breaking his leg. He was captured by Ferdinand's men, while Gerald was captured by the Leonese majordomo, Fernán Ruiz de Castro, called el Castellano ("the Castilian"). After the mêlée the Leonese had control of the town and the alcazaba, which they soon relinquished to their Muslim allies. Ferdinand succeeded in gaining the valley of the upper Limia and the regions of Toroño (around Tuy), Capraria (around Verín), and Lobarzana (around Chaves) from Afonso in exchange for his release. Several of Gerald's conquests were ceded to purchase his freedom. Ferdinand retained Cáceres, but Trujillo, Montánchez, Santa Cruz de la Sierra, and Monfragüe he gave to Fernán Ruiz.

== Campaigns 1169-1173 ==
The debacle at Badajoz did not break the determination of Geraldes and he resumed the raids on the region from Juromenha that same year in the Summer. Months of raids followed but the new Almohad governor of Badajoz proved up to the task. With the aid of the knights-villein of Santarém, the Fearless lured the garrison of Badajoz into a gorge where he had left some companions in wait. The Almohads were ambushed and annihilated, with many having been taken prisoner. Among them was Abd ben Muhammad ben Sahib al-Salah, a member of one of the most important families of Beja, who was ransomed for 300 dinars and would later write a chronicle in which the actions of Geraldo would be recorded.

In April 1170, the constant raids on the surrounding fields of Badajoz, the blockade of the roads leading to the city and a crop failure brough famine upon the city. Seville dispatched a 5000 donkeys caravan loaded with food, weapons and fodder to supply the population and it was escorted by Berber and Andaluzi troops commanded by Abu Yahya Zakariya ben Ali. Geraldo was tipped of its departure and set up another ambushed in a mountain pass where the caravan would necessarily have to pass. On the 15 of May, the caravan was ambushed and captured at a place that henceforth became known as the Valle de Matamoros, or Moor-Slayer Valley.

Alarmed by the attacks on Badajoz, the Almohad Caliph then dispatched a large army to the Iberian Peninsula commanded by his own brother Abu Hafs Umar. Geraldo the Fearless and Crown prince Sancho sieged Badajoz once more in October, and from Seville Abu Hafs dispatched a relief force to the city commanded by Abu Said Uthman. Badajoz was once more saved by a joint Almohad-Leonese force but the Portuguese withdrew in good order this time. Abu Said Uthman pressed on into Portugal and captured Juromenha, but Geraldo the Fearless evaded capture and relocated to Lobón.

From Lobón, Geraldo continued to raid the territory of Badajoz, but in October 1171 a new caravan of 4000 mules reached the city, and the detachment in charge of escorting it then captured Lobón. Geraldo escaped once more, however.

== Serving the Almohads ==
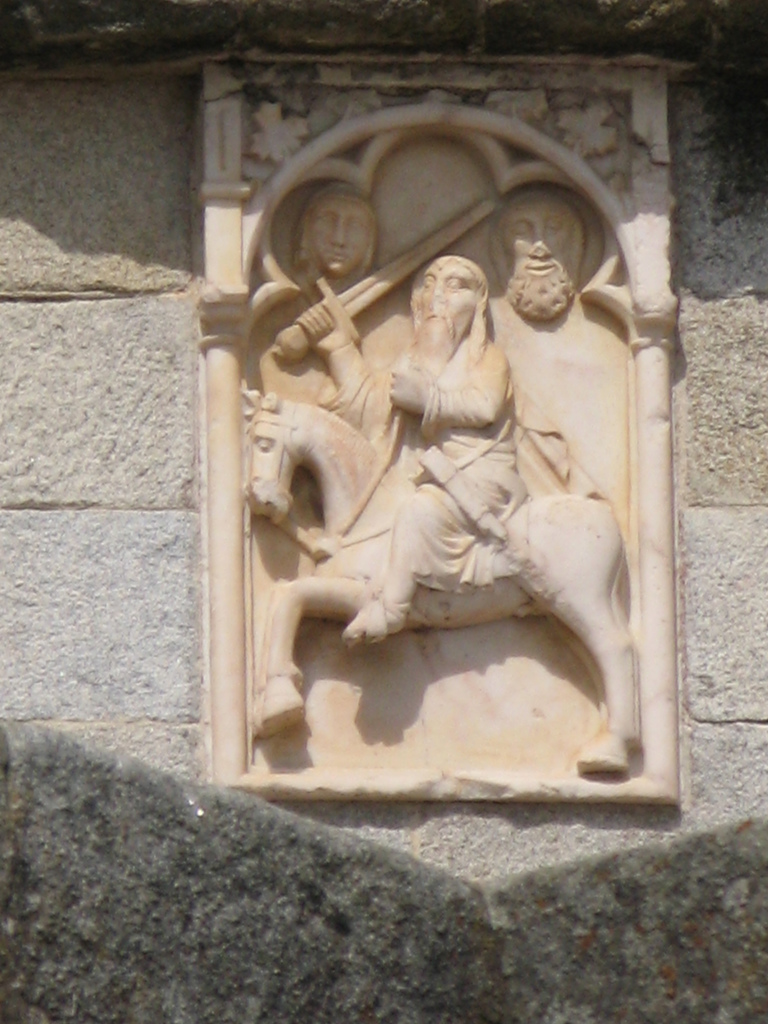
Sculpture of Gerald the Fearless at the Cathedral of Évora

In 1171 and 1172, while Yusuf was waging war on Valencia and Murcia, general anarchy prevailed in the Extremadura as Leonese, Portuguese, and Almohad troops fought for supremacy. Gerald took advantage of Yusuf's absence to conquer Beja in the Alentejo (1172). When he and Afonso disagree over whether to hold the site or raze it, Gerald—"impoverished and bereft of all aid"—went to Seville to put himself in the service of the caliph. To keep him away from Portugal he was sent to Morocco with 350 troops. There he received the governorship of al-Sūs (the plains and mountains of southern Morocco), but soon entered into negotiations with his former monarch concerning the use of al-Sūs as a base for a Portuguese invasion. When his correspondence was intercepted, he was arrested and put to death. The Chronica latina regum castellae, a Latin Christian chronicle, summarises Gerald's career in one paragraph at the end of its tenth chapter:

Also then [at the capture of Afonso I at Badajoz] was captured Gerald, alias "without fear", who was given over to Rodrigo Fernández [sic], the Castilian, to whom, in exchange for his liberty, Gerald handed over Montánchez, Trujillo, Santa Cruz de la Sierra, and Monfragüe, which the same Gerald had gained from the Saracens, to whom he had caused much damage, and by whom he was decapitated in Moroccan territory on a laughable pretext.

The chief source for Gerald's negotiations with the caliph and his death in Morocco is Ibn 'Idhārī al-Marrākushī's Al-Bayān al-Mugrib. Many of the cities and castles that Gerald captured with ease were later re-conquered by the Almohads, who improved their fortifications so much that they were not taken by the Christians again until the next century. Cáceres was besieged four times without success (1184, 1213, 1218, and 1222) and is usually referred to as a castrum famossum ("famous castle") or muy fuerte castillo ("very strong castle") in Christian sources, although it had fallen relatively easily to Gerald. Trujillo was not taken by the Christians again until 1234. The defences of Badajoz were completely reworked after 1169 and those that survive today are almost entirely of the Almohad period; the city only fell to the Christians permanently in 1226.

The dauntless Gerald: in his left he bears
Two watchmen's heads, his right the falchion rears:
The gate he opens, swift from ambush rise
His ready bands, the city falls his prize:
Évora still the grateful honour pays,
Her banner'd flag the mighty deed displays:
There frowns the hero; in his left he bears
The two cold heads, his right the falchion rears.
—Camões, The Lusiads
(Canto VIII, 21)

== Legacy and legend ==
Gerald left his mark on the toponymy of the Extremadura. A document of the Order of Calatrava of 1218 refers to the cabeza de giraldo ("head of Gerald") as a place, without indicating where it lay. Two streams, the Geradillo and the Geraldo, the first flowing from the second and into the Tagus, are also named after Gerald. The region where the stream originates is in the highlands around Casas de Miravete, which is quite possibly the site of the cabeza.

The legends which later arose surrounding Gerald are given concise retelling by Louis-Adrien Duperron de Castera, a French translator:

He was a man of rank, who, in order to avoid the legal punishment to which several crimes rendered him obnoxious, put himself at the head of a party of freebooters. Tiring, however, of that life, he resolved to reconcile himself to his sovereign by some noble action. Full of this idea, one evening he entered Évora, which then belonged to the Moors. In the night he killed the sentinels of one of the gates, which he opened to his companions, who soon became masters of the place. This exploit had its desired effect. The king pardoned Gerald, and made him governor of Évora. A knight with a sword in one hand, and two heads in the other, from that time became the armorial bearing of the city.
