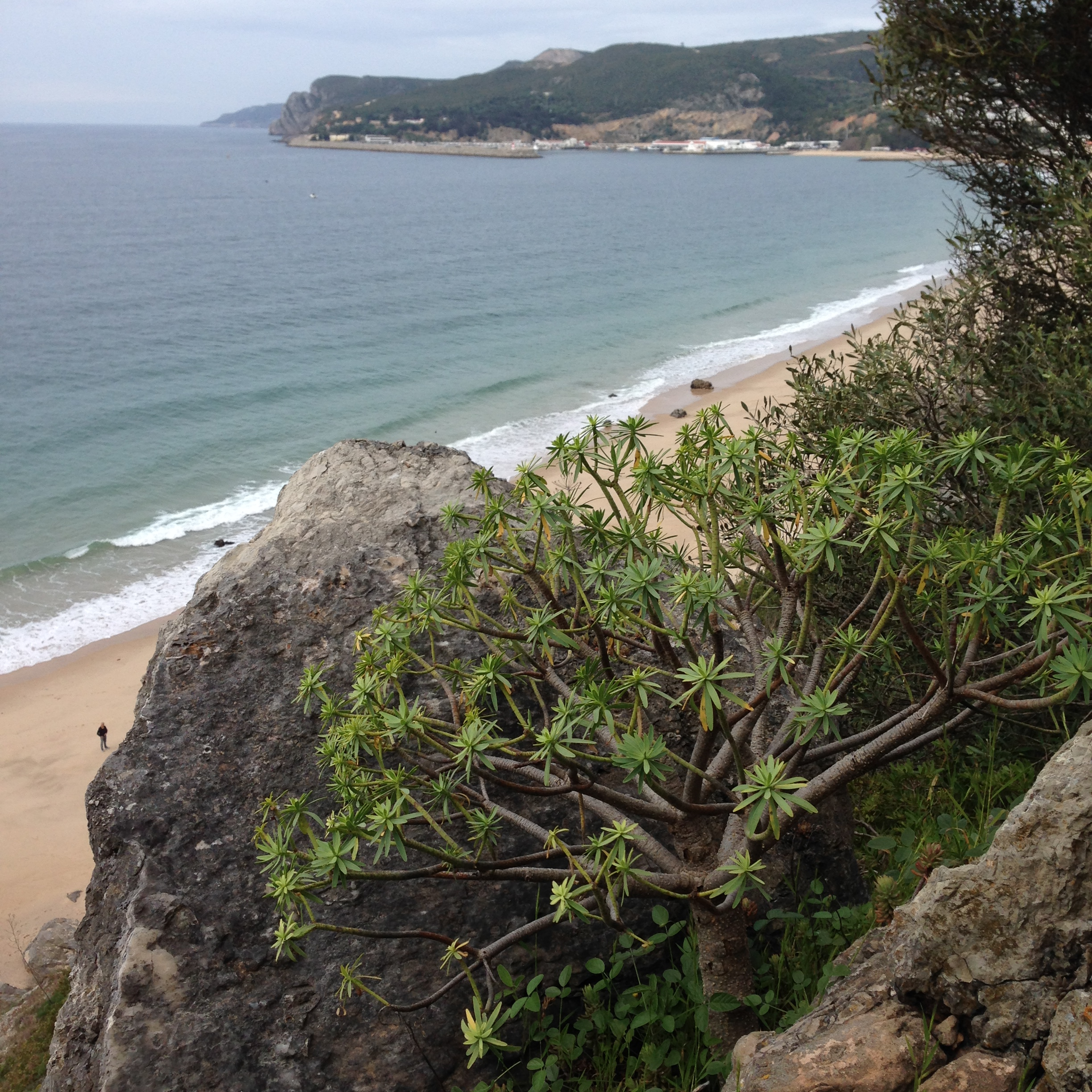

Conservation status
- Vulnerable (IUCN 3.1)
- CITES Appendix II (CITES)

Scientific classification
- Kingdom: Plantae
- Clade: Tracheophytes
- Clade: Angiosperms
- Clade: Eudicots
- Clade: Rosids
- Order: Malpighiales
- Family: Euphorbiaceae
- Genus: Euphorbia
- Species: E. pedroi

Binomial name
- Euphorbia pedroi Molero & Rovira

= Euphorbia pedroi =

Species of flowering plant

Euphorbia pedroi (known in Portuguese as eufórbia-de-gomes-pedro or tabaíba-do-espichel) is a species of flowering plant in the spurge family endemic to the Arrábida Natural Park in Portugal. It is part of section Aphyllis, a mostly African and Macaronesian clade, being the only member of its section native to Europe. Its binomial name is dedicated to José Gomes Pedro (1915–2010), a Portuguese botanist who studied the flora and vegetation of Arrábida and Mozambique.

== Description ==
Euphorbia pedroi is a sub-succulent shrub that can reach 2 m (6.6 ft) tall. Leaves are 25 mm–60 mm × 4 mm–10 mm (0.98 in–2.36 in × 0.16 in–0.39 in), green or somewhat glaucous. Cyathium is 2.8–4 mm (0.11–0.16 in) with a 1–3 mm (0.039–0.118 in) peduncle, glabrous or slightly hairy both in the base and peduncle. Fruit is 4.2 mm–5 mm × 5.8 mm–7.2 mm (0.17 in–0.20 in × 0.23 in–0.28 in) yellowish-green or reddish, seeds are reddish brown, 2.8 mm–3.2 mm × 2 mm–2.3 mm (0.110 in–0.126 in × 0.079 in–0.091 in) and somewhat dorsiventrally flattened.

== Distribution and habitat ==
Euphorbia pedroi is native to the Arrábida Natural Park, specifically between Cabo Espichel and Sesimbra on the Setúbal Peninsula, in the Atlantic coast. It is found on slopes of south-facing limestone cliffs on incipient soils or rock cracks subjected to regular mist and strong winds.
