= Cape Espichel =

Headland in Setúbal, Portugal

Cape Espichel Cabo Espichel (Portuguese)
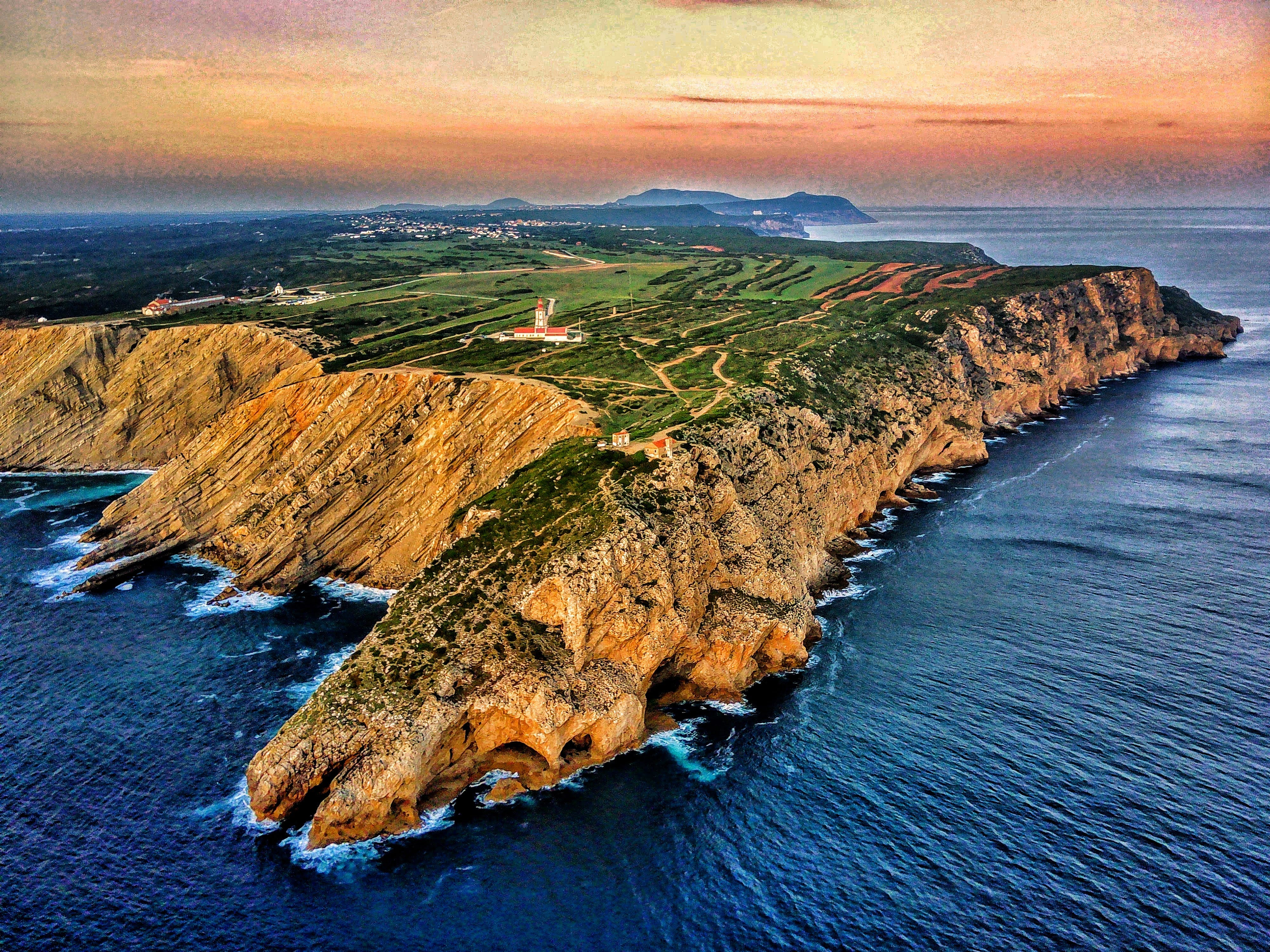
- Cape Espichel as seen from the air, looking eastwards.

- Location within Portugal
- Coordinates: 38°24′50.8″N 9°13′20.8″W
- Location: Castelo, Sesimbra, Portugal
- Elevation: 134 m (440 ft)

Cape Espichel (pronounced [(i)ʃpiˈʃɛl]) is a cape situated on the western coast of the civil parish of Castelo, municipality of Sesimbra, in the Portuguese district of Setúbal, at the very southwestern corner of the Setubal Peninsula. It is characterized by a very acute protrusion of the coastline into the Atlantic Ocean, and it consists of a promontory plateau, over 130 meters above sea level, defined by dramatic, sheer cliffs all around the delimitation of the cape against the ocean.
The location offers elevated sweeping views, from Cascais and the Sintra Mountains, and the Caparica coast to the north, and to the southeast the beaches south of Tróia and beyond to Sines.
Cape Espichel is part of several overlapping environmental protection areas.

== Natural history ==
=== Geology ===
==== Regional setting ====
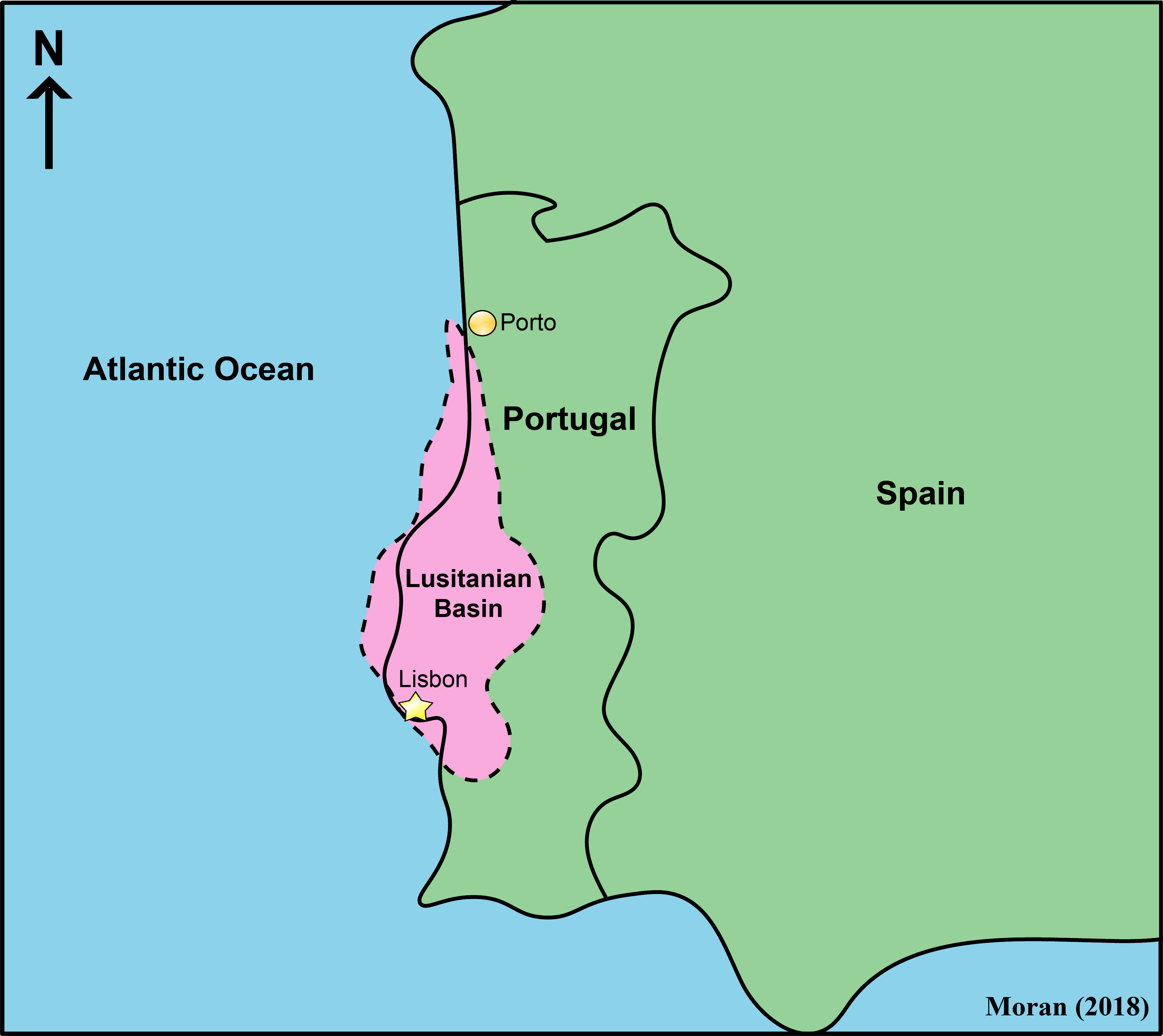
The regional setting of the Lusitanian Basin.

Cape Espichel is located within the Lusitanian Basin, a regional geologic feature formed during the opening of the North Atlantic, a process which began in the Triassic and continues still today.

==== Tectonics, structural geology, and geomorphology ====
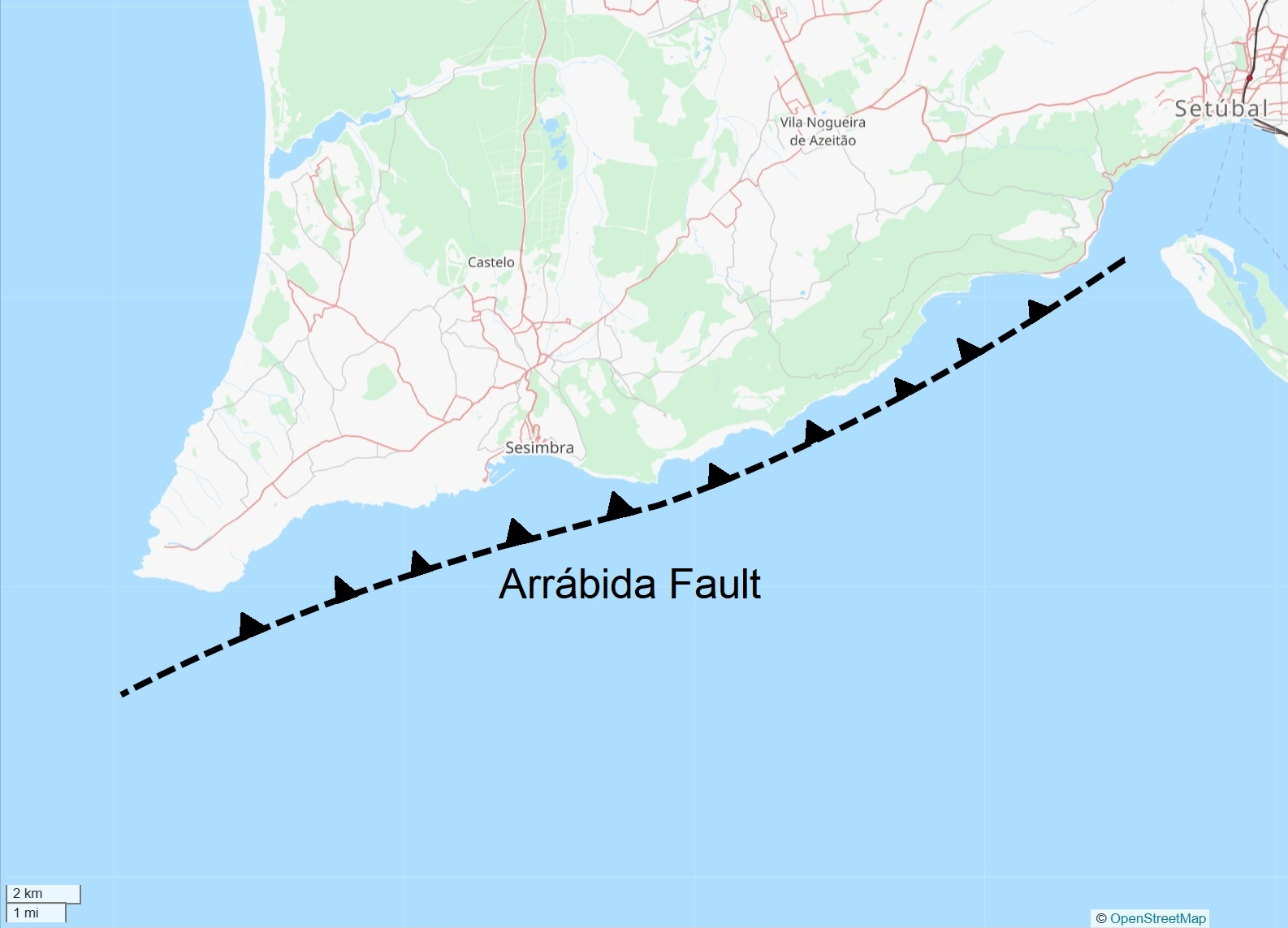
The approximate Arrábida Fault trace

As the incipient North Atlantic Ocean began to spread, Portugal was then located on the eastern margin of the seawater-flooded rift valley. The extensional tectonic setting formed large normal faults during this process, including the Arrábida Fault, whose fault plane dips steeply towards the north-northwest, and whose trace is nowadays underwater, just south of the cape, tracing approximately from west to the east, including south of the Arrábida chain.
During the Cenozoic, due to how, given enough tectonic plate displacement, the geometry of tectonic plates moving away from a divergent boundary at one location on a spherical globe must eventually force convergence and compression someplace else (due to the lack of further free surface area on the globe to allow for indefinite motion), and having occurred sufficient extensional tectonic motion, the local tectonic setting switched from extensional to compressional. As a result, the Arrábida Fault eventually inverted motion direction, becoming a reverse fault.
As the crust was regionally compressed from the north and south directions, the northern fault block rode up the fault plane, folding the rock strata upwards in the process, and forming a partial fault-bend fold, whose top continuously eroded. As a result, a geomorphological scarp of dramatic maritime cliffs formed. The folding mechanism produced the steep northwards dip observable in the strata at the Espichel location, and the dip progressively levels towards horizontality northwards from the cape end and away from the Arrábida Fault's plane trace.

==== Stratigraphy ====
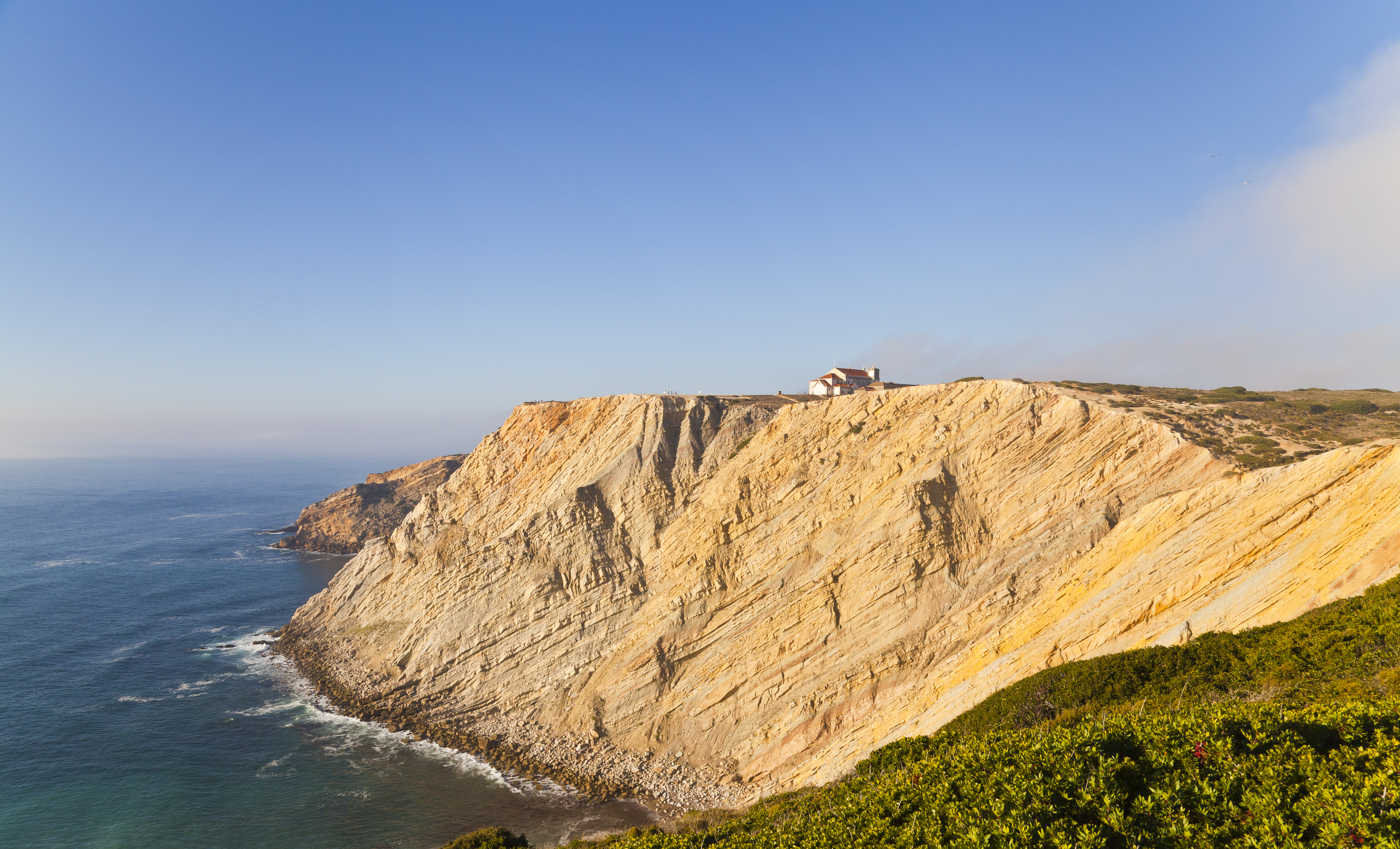
A portion of the Jurassic strata cross-section, as seen from near the lighthouse, looking north.

The geology at Cape Espichel is of utmost stratigraphic relevance. The cliff faces cut through strata of Late Jurassic and Early Cretaceous age, consisting of limestone, clayey limestone, marl, and sandstone, which were deposited in different types of coastal environments. In excellent geologic succession, progressing upwards in time from the cape end northwards, the dipping strata are displayed along the western cliff faces as a natural cross-section, especially impressive when seen from the sea.

=== Paleontology ===
Though the area is rich in various types of marine coral and mollusk fossils, as well as diverse ichnofossils, there are two outstanding dinosaur fossil trackway locations about one kilometer NNE of the cape, on the cliff walls that limit Lagosteiros Bay, exposed in some of the now dipping rock strata:

- Pedra da Mua Natural Monument, on the south side cliffs of the bay, in strata of Late Jurassic age. Among other types of behavior, it portrays the passage of a herd of seven small sauropod dinosaurs, the first evidence site discovered in Europe for such behavior among those animals.
- Lagosteiros Natural Monument, atop the north side cliffs of the bay, of Early Cretaceous age, displays the first known Early Cretaceous dinosaur trackways found in Portugal.
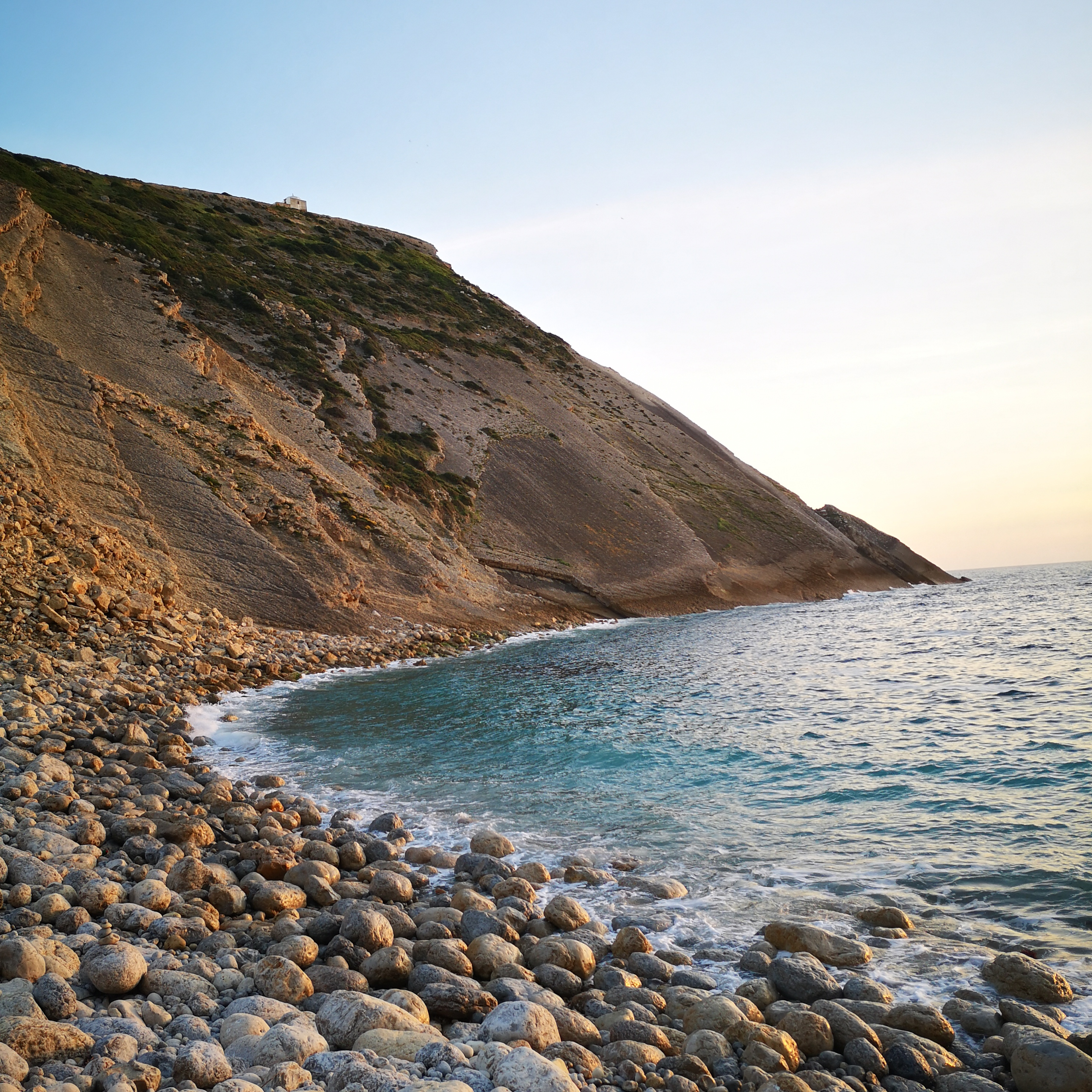
The Pedra da Mua Natural Monument, as seen from Lagosteiros Beach.

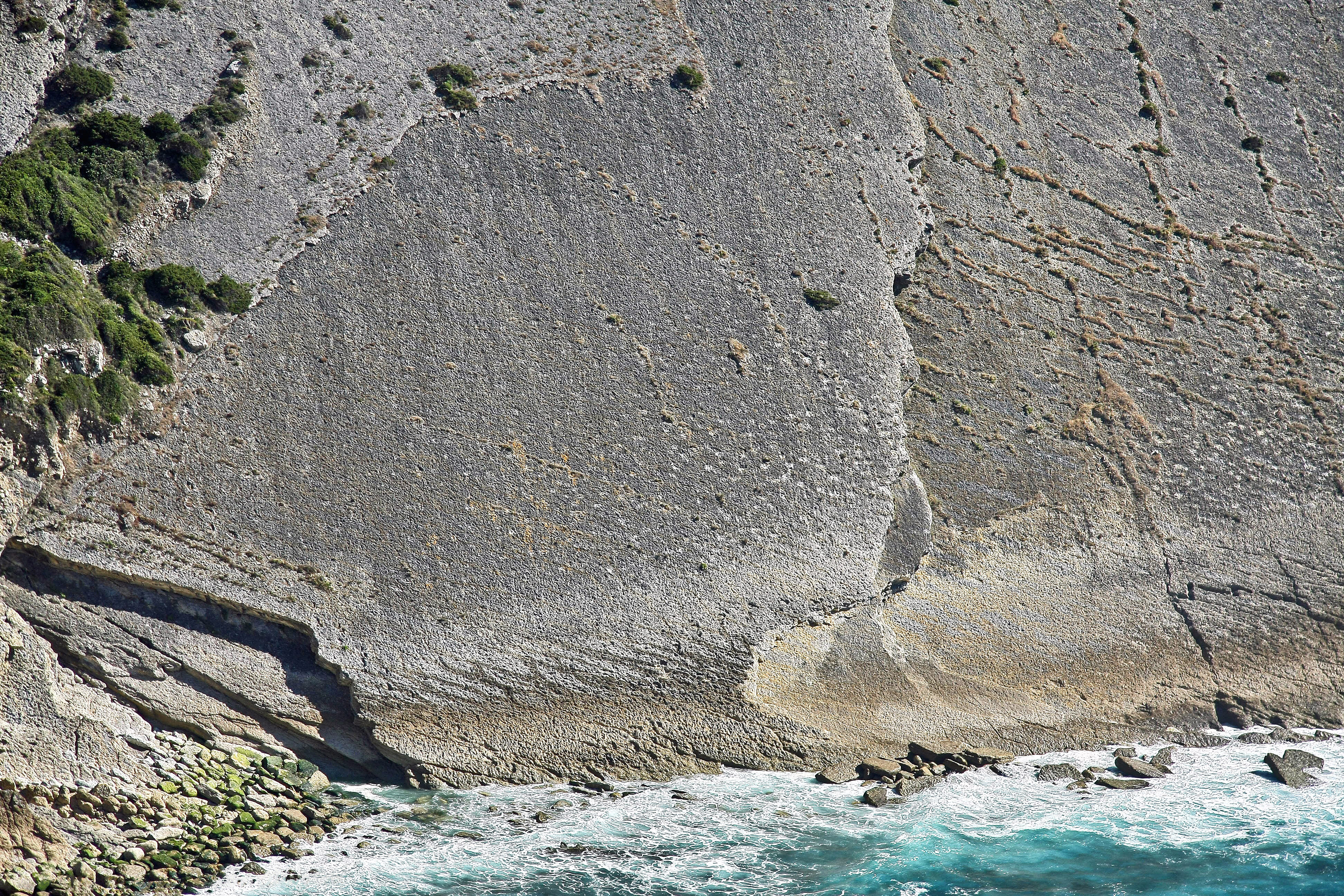
One of the several rock strata in the Pedra da Mua Natural Monument containing trackways.

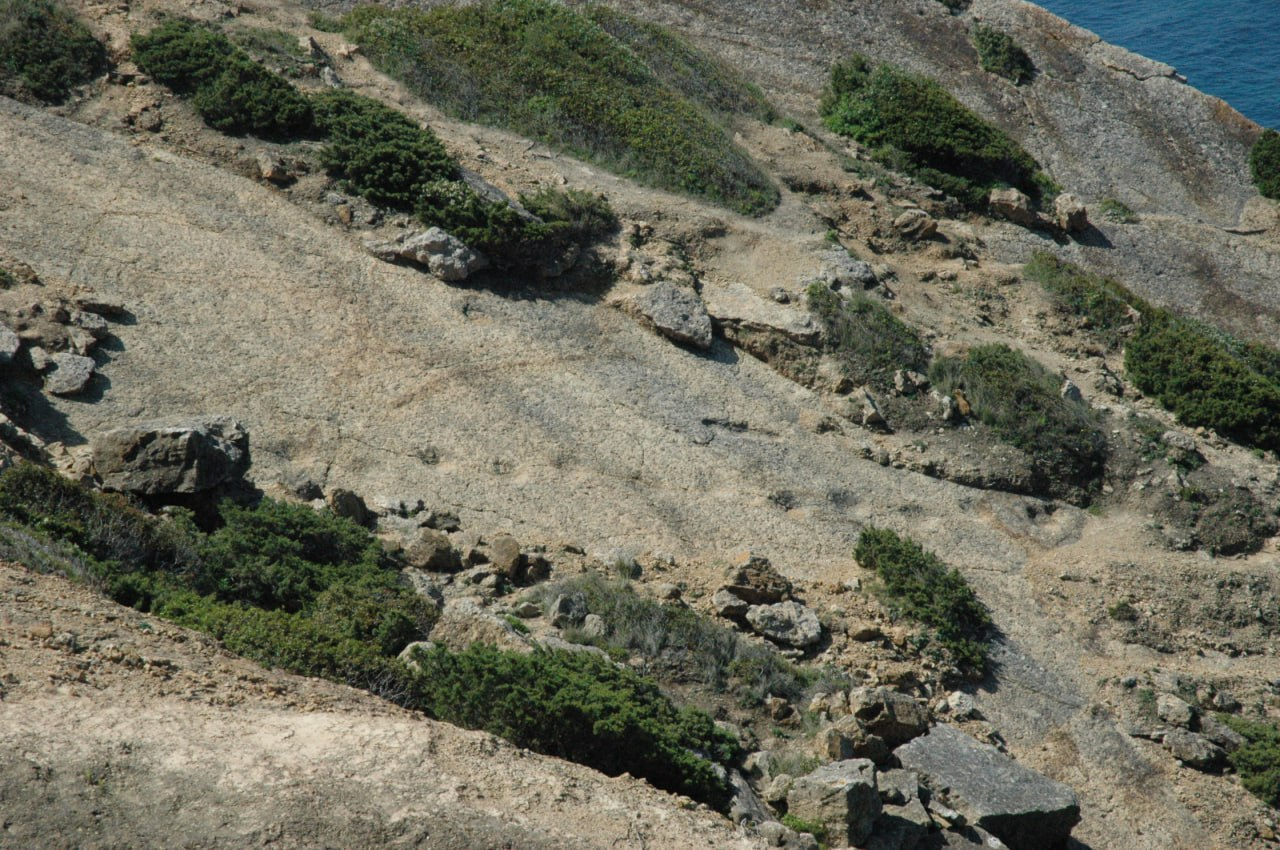
The main trackway at the Lagosteiros Natural Monument.

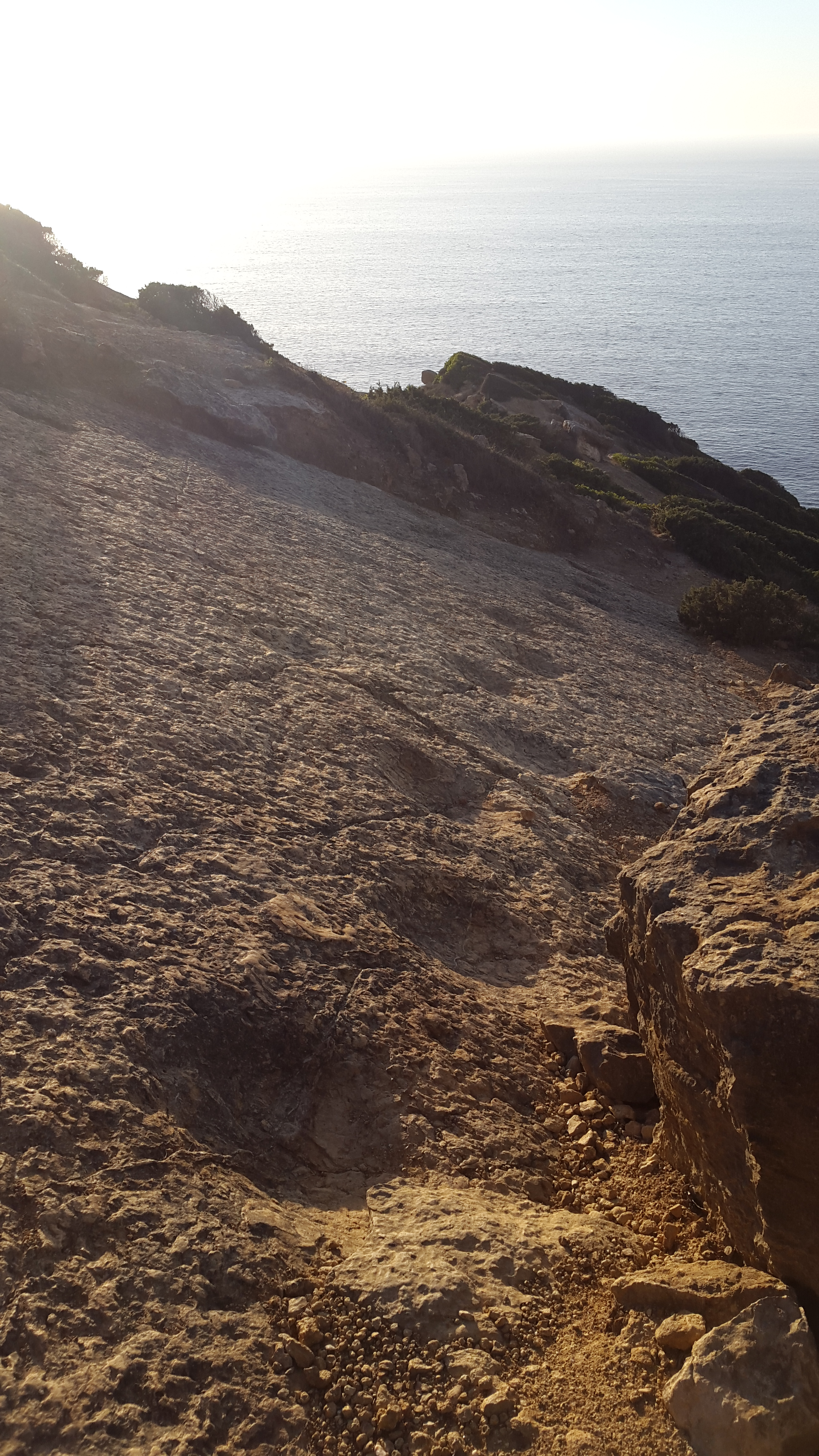
The main trackway at the Lagosteiros Natural Monument.

=== Ecosystem ===
The landscape at Cape Espichel is typical Portuguese Mediterranean shrubland. Some species, such as Juniperus turbinata and kermes oak mostly favor sheltered areas, normally at the bottom of the ephemeral creek valleys that furrow the plateau, where they benefit from greater soil thickness, greater water retention capacity and greater richness in soil nutrients.
In interfluves or exposed slopes, the areas most exposed to the prevailing winds and with incipient soils (high surface stoniness, low effective thickness, poverty of nutrients, and low water retention capacity), a low bush forest of Thymus zygis ssp. sylvestris and endemic Ulex densus dominates the landscape, but with a ground cover inferior to that found in the bush areas in the sheltered valleys described earlier.
On the coastal cliffs or steep slopes, influenced by saltwater spray and wind, with soils impoverished by leaching, a low vegetation assemblage with weak ground cover dominates, consisting mainly of Limonium species and rock samphire, and occupying small depressions among and within fissures in the limestone outcrops.

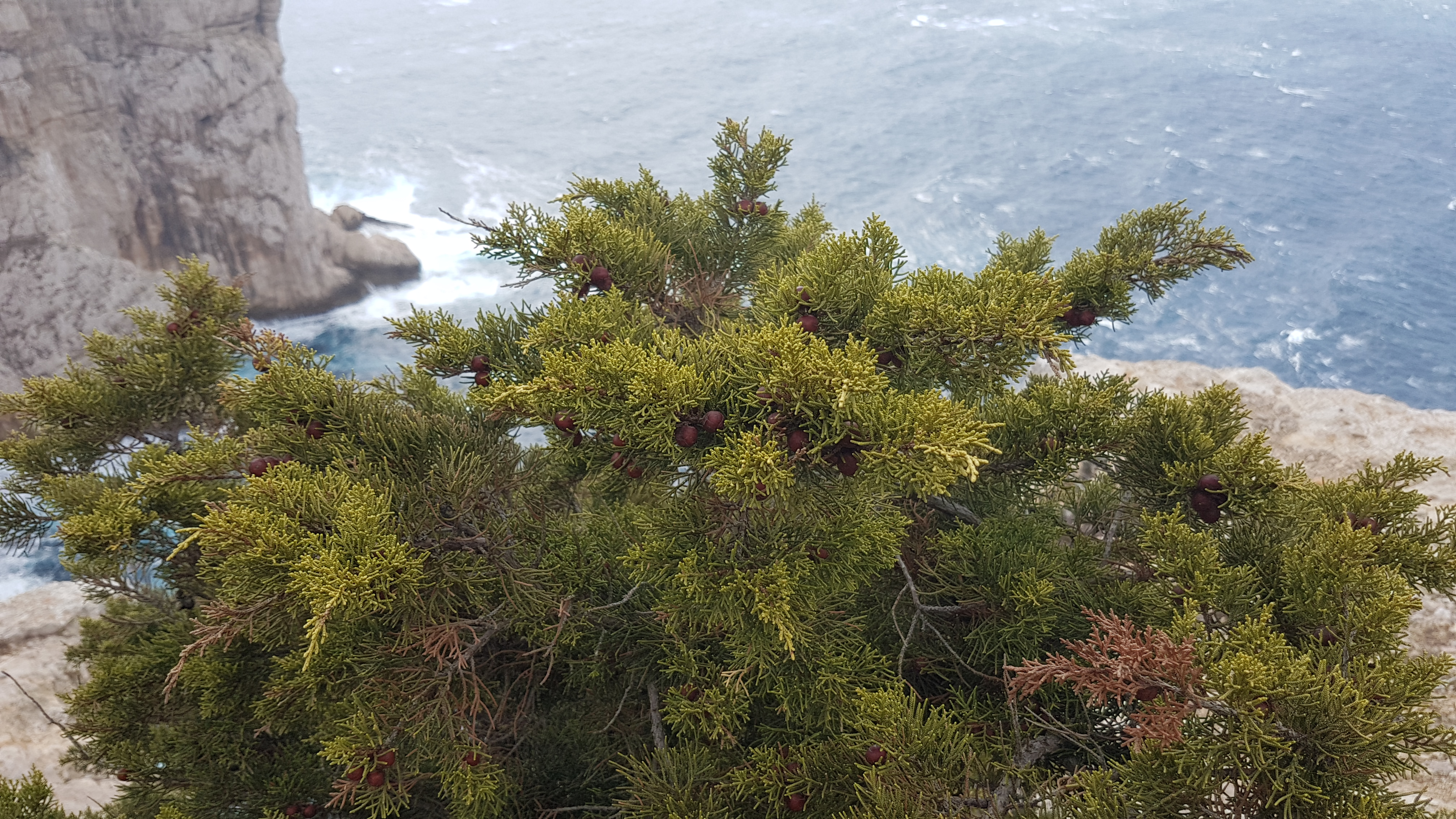
Juniperus turbinata

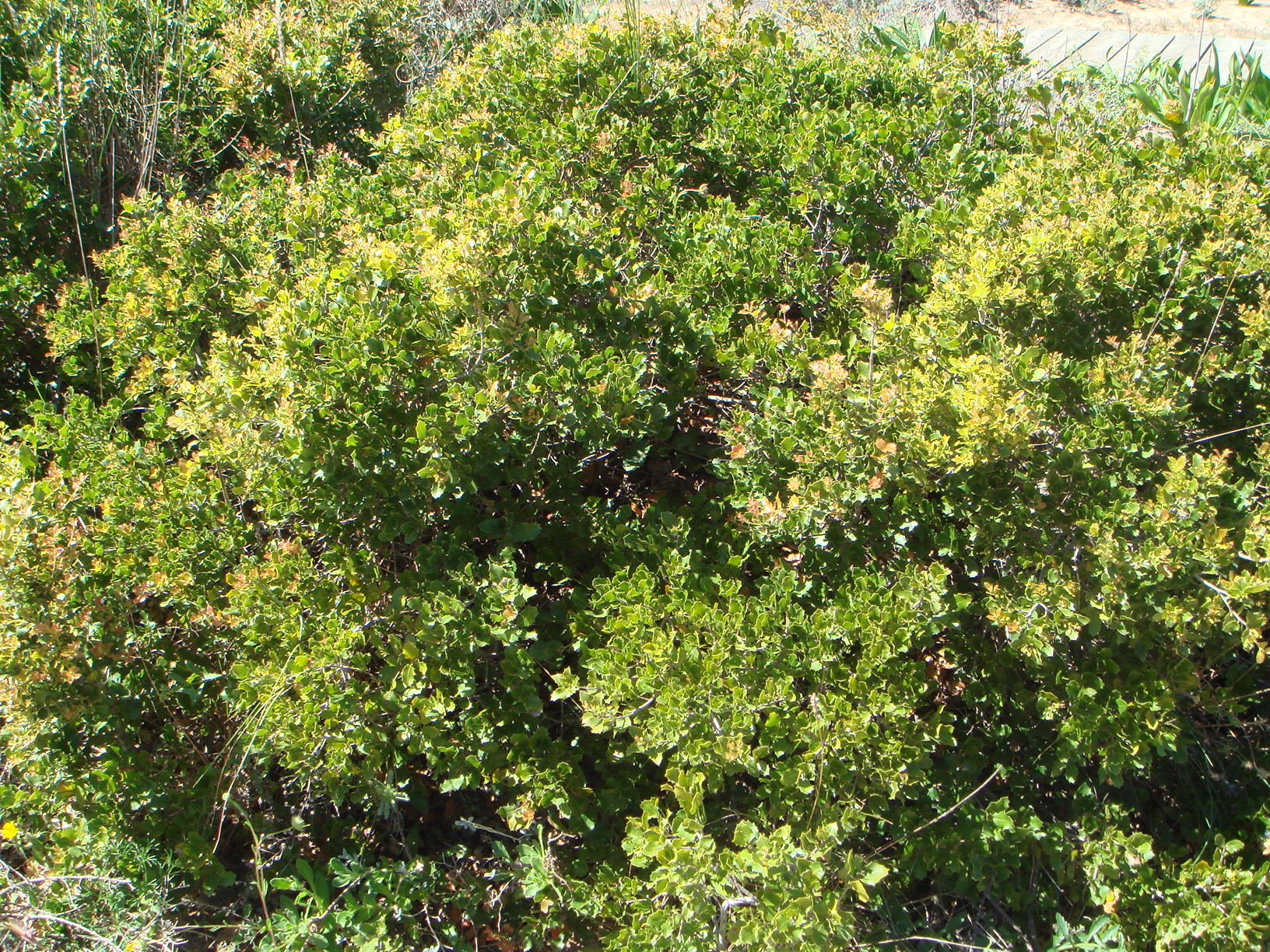
Kermes oak

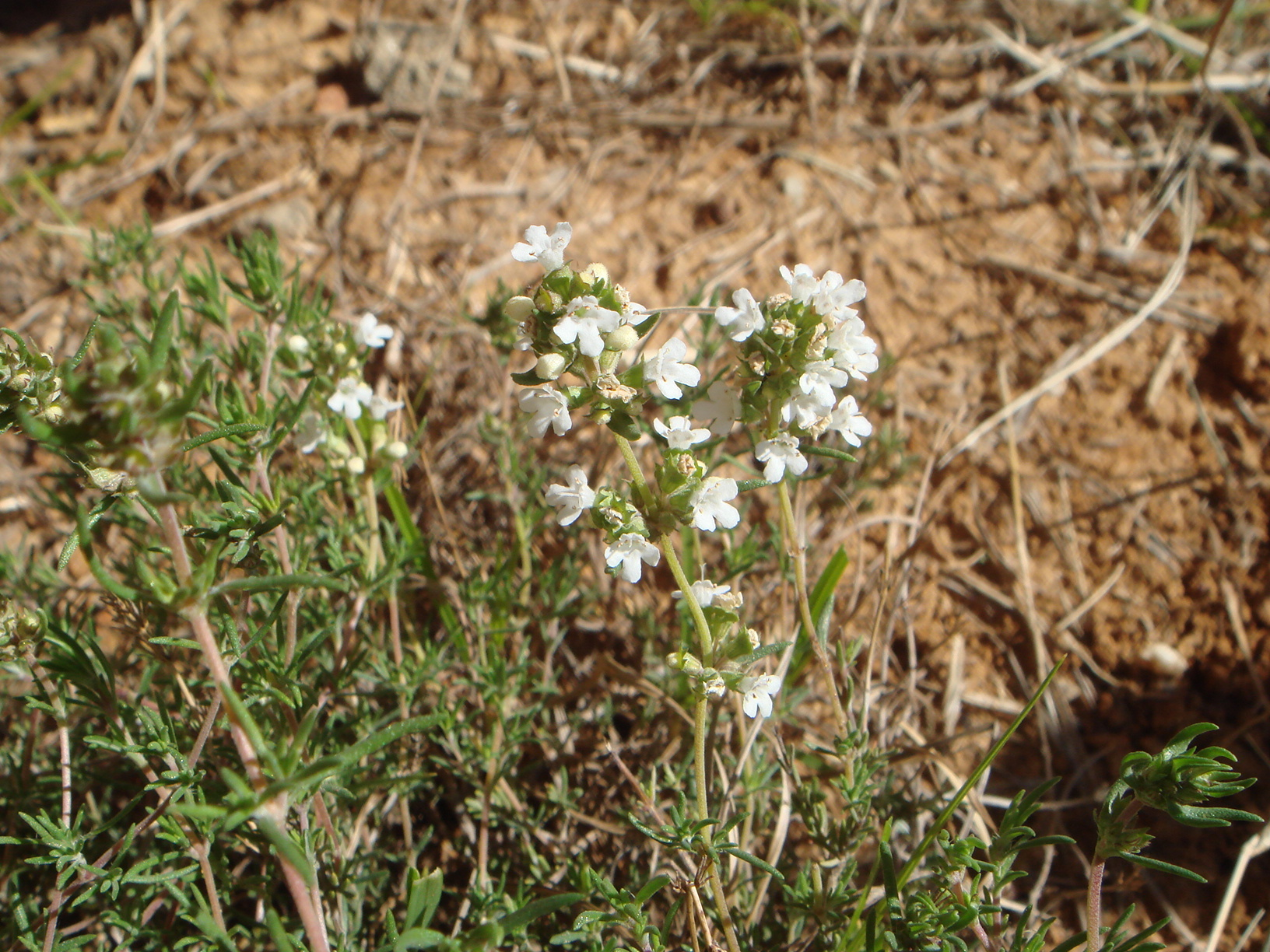
Thymus zygis

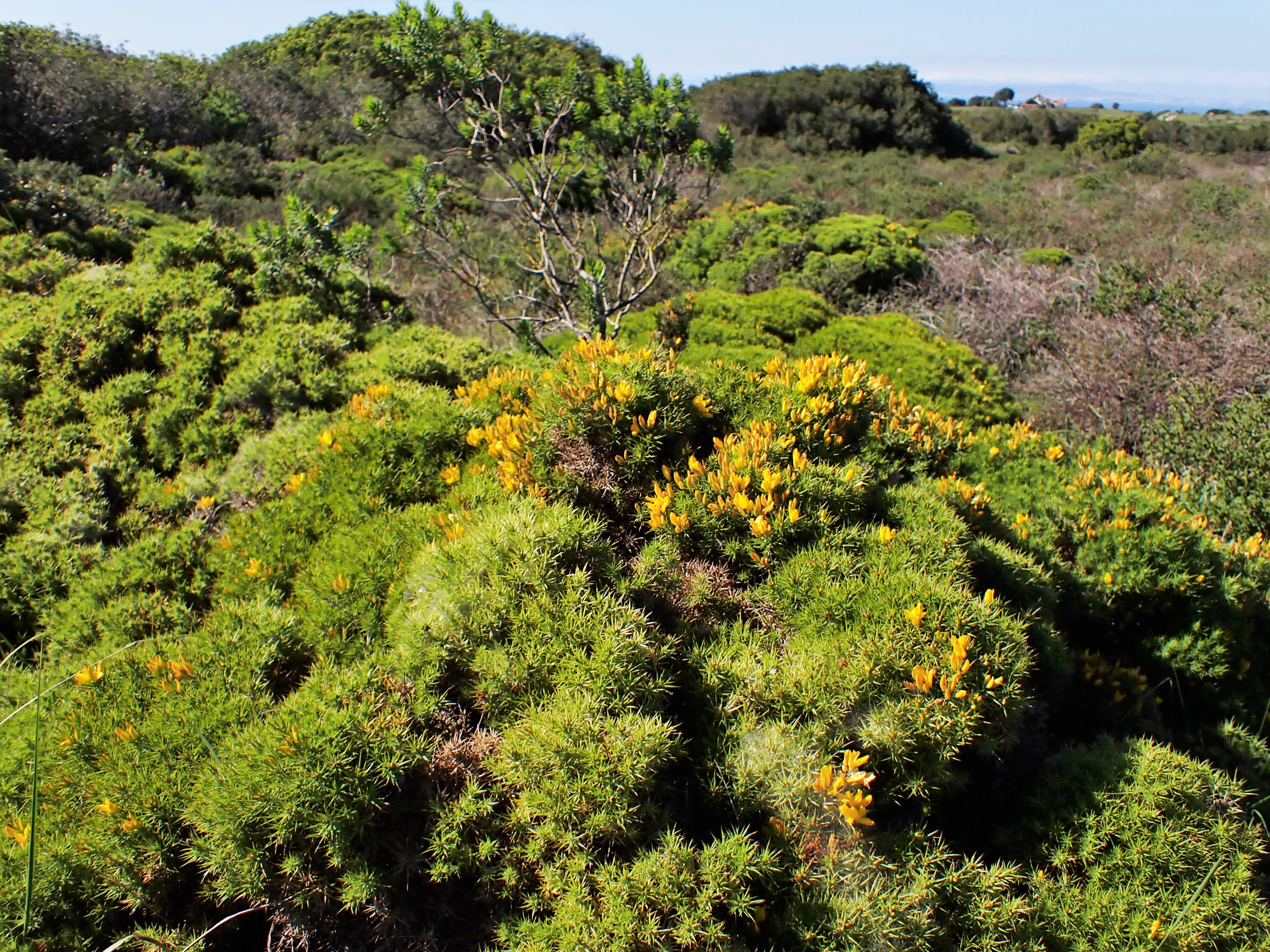
Ulex densus

==== Environmental preservation ====
Cape Espichel is part of the Espichel Special Protection Zone (ZPE Espichel), the Arrábida / Espichel Special Conservation Zone (ZEC Arrábida / Espichel), and the Arrábida Natural Park.

== Human history ==
=== Prehistory ===
==== Paleolithic ====
Prehistorical archaeological evidence indicates that the Espichel area was inhabited by hunter-gatherer groups as early as the Paleolithic period. The discovery of stone tools and other artifacts in various archaeological sites in the area provides evidence of human occupation dating back further than ten thousand years.

==== Neolithic ====
Due to its topography, Cape Espichel may have been used as a division between the realms of the living and the dead. Dating from the 6th/5th millennium BC, some traces of funerary practices were found. Several symbolic funerary artefacts have been found in the caves facing the sea, located on the south slope. Ceramic and osteological remains attest to this spiritual universe, and at Cape Espichel there are several locations with such materials from this period.

=== History ===
==== Roman Empire ====
During the times when Roman settlements persisted in the Iberian Peninsula, the Roman presence on the cape was limited, perhaps due to how the Romans considered capes to be sacred locations, where the gods met at night. In Ora maritima, Avienius named Cape Espichel, Cabo Cêmpsico, a name possibly associated with the peoples that lived in the vicinity. Later, the geographer Strabo called this area Promontorium Barbaricum.

==== Umayyad Caliphate ====
Though the Umayyad Caliphate extended over the territory of Espichel, there has never been found any archeological evidence of Muslim settlements. The local toponymy, however, includes a few names with Arabic roots, such as Azóia, the nearest village to the cape, which derived from Al Zawiya (meaning hermitage).

==== Middle Ages ====
===== The Naval Battle of Cape Espichel =====
During the Middle Ages, various legends attracted people to the site but it was a crucible of Portuguese nationalism, when on 29 July 1180, on the waters of Cape Espichel, Sir Fuas Roupinho (Dom Fuas Roupinho in Portuguese) achieved the nation's first naval victory against the caliphate.

===== The Lady of the Cape tale =====
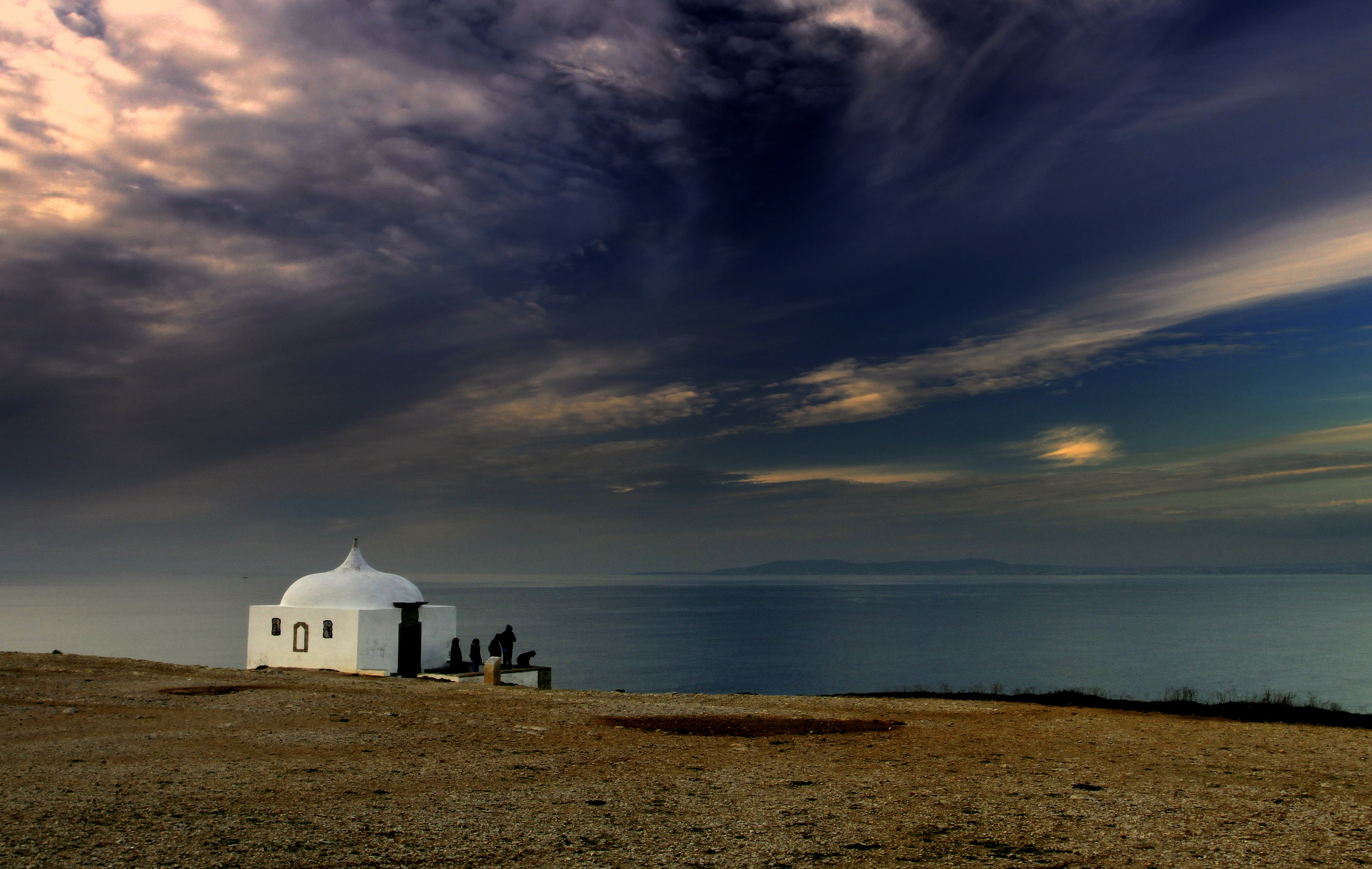
The Shrine of Memory, by the cliff edge.

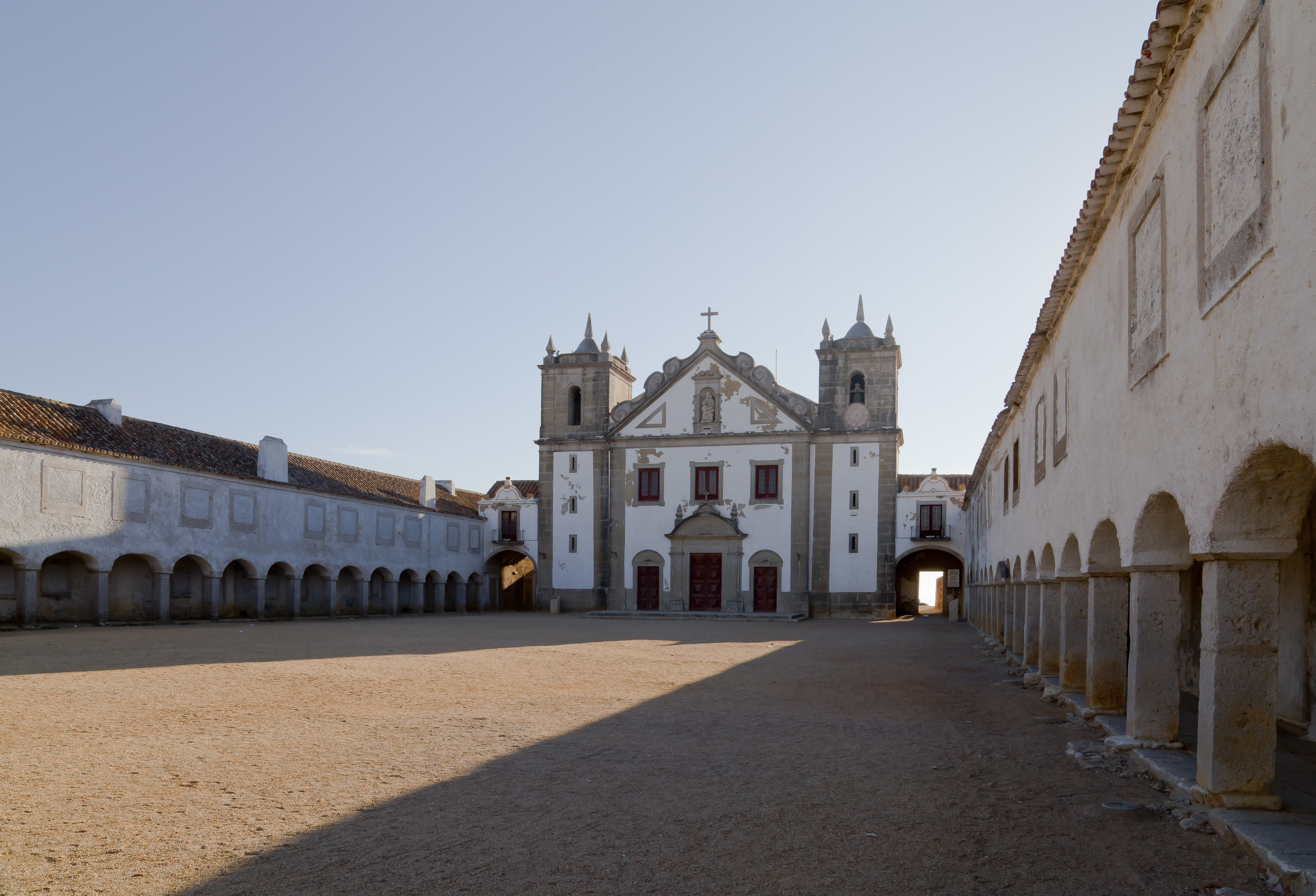
The 15th century Sanctuary of Our Lady of Cape Espichel

Atop the Pedra da Mua Natural Monument, the modest Shrine of Memory sits alone on the cliff edge, marking a mythical location: superstition linked the dinosaur trackways below to an appearance of the Holy Virgin (Our Lady), who, according to legend, ascended from the sea up the cliff walls on a mule, leaving a trackway in the solid rock below, and appeared before two pilgrims who had traveled from afar after dreaming of her.

The legend led to an annual pilgrimage to the remote site, resulting in the edification of the Sanctuary of Our Lady of Cape Espichel, often incorrectly referred to as a convent, which includes the Church of Our Lady of the Cape and pilgrim accommodations (Casa dos Círios).

==== Other significant events ====
===== Fort of Our Lady of the Cape =====
In 1672, to the west of the original religious shrine, the construction of the small Fort of Our Lady of the Cape began at the edge of the cliff. In 1796, it was reported that half of the fort fell down to the sea due to the collapse of the cliff's edge, and in 1802 it seems the remainder of the fort structure was demolished.
Today, one can still see the implantation remains of the fort on location, and in aerial photographs the sharp eastwards-pointing corner of the former defensive wall of the fort is still visible on the ground as a faint outline in the vegetation and soil near the cliff edge along the contemporary tourist path.

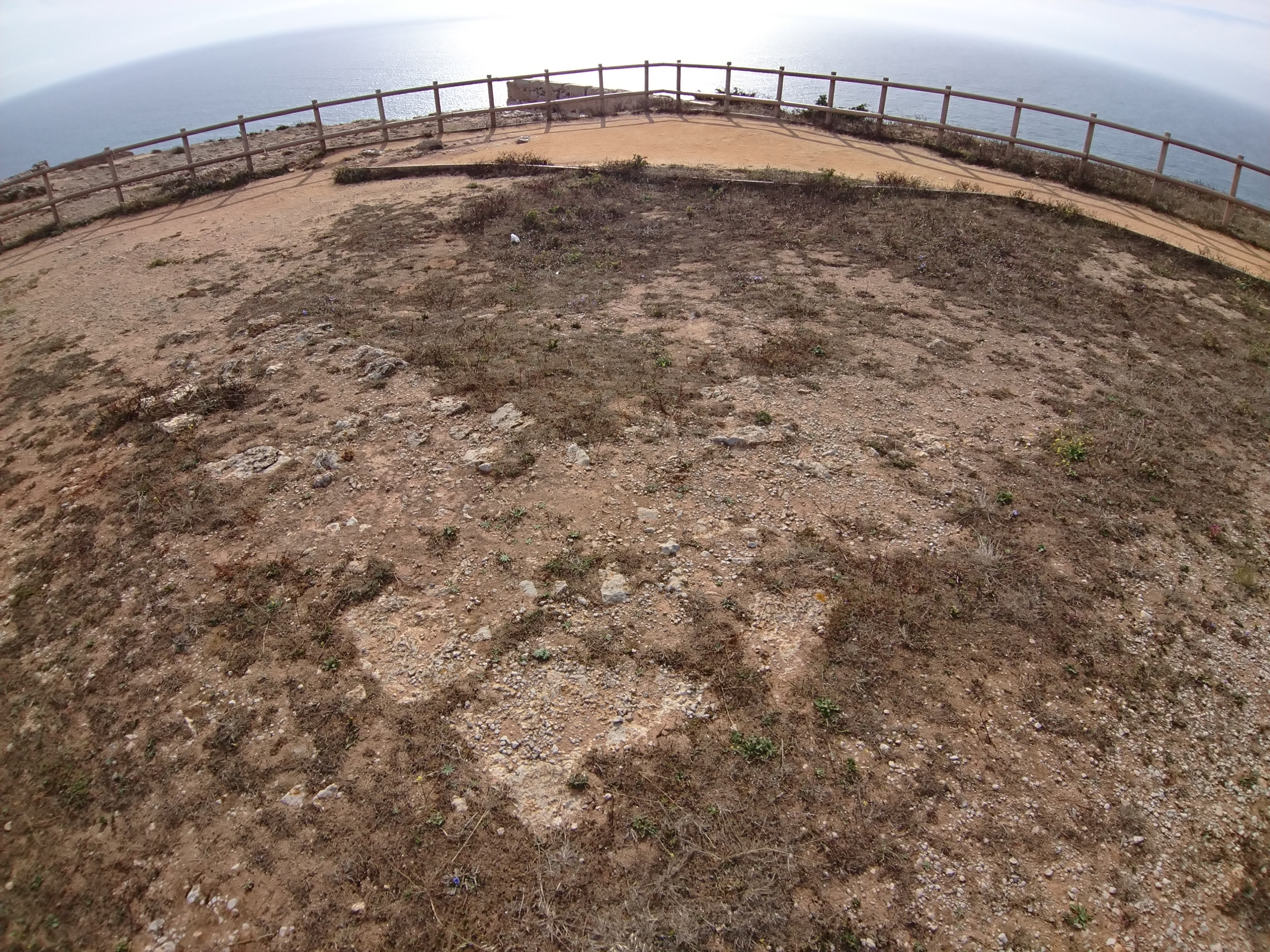
The outline of the foundations' remains of a corner of the wall fortifications of the fort.

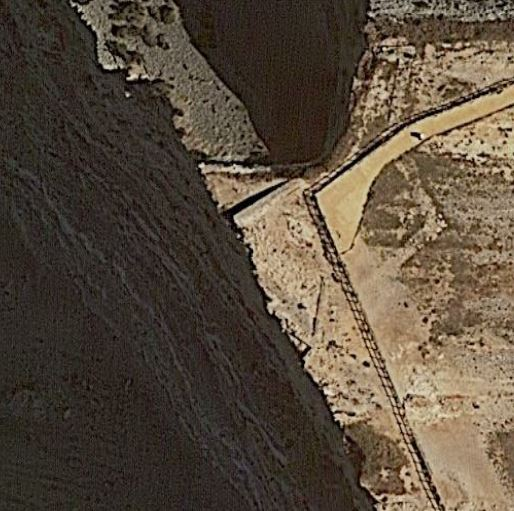
Aerial photograph showing the outline of the former defensive wall of the fort by the cliff's edge.

===== Cape Espichel Lighthouse =====
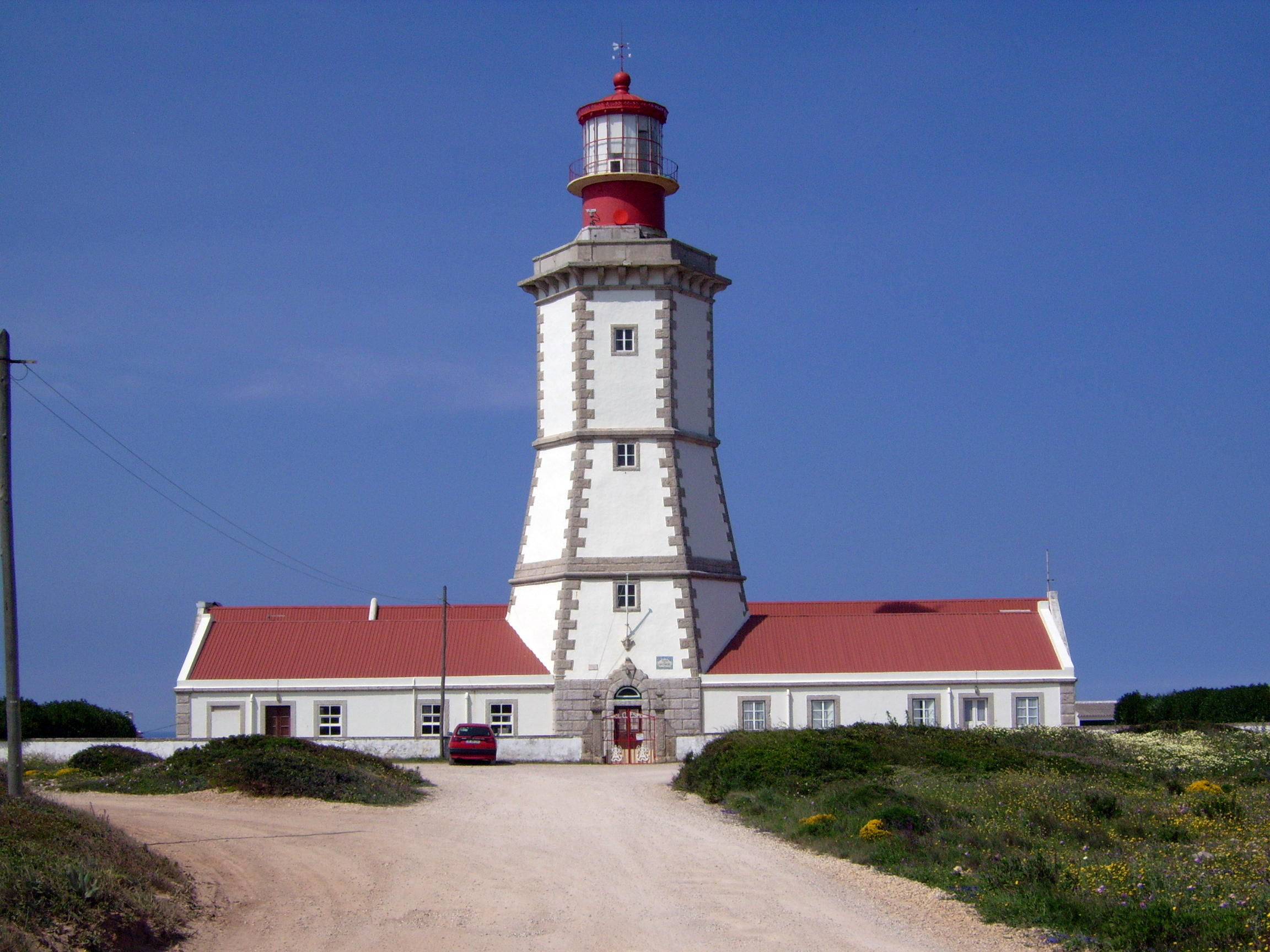
The Cape Espichel Lighthouse.

In 1790 the Cape Espichel Lighthouse was built about six hundred meters south of the sanctuary. It consists of a hexagonal tower in three levels, built with thick masonry walls.
