= Arrábida Natural Park =

Protected area in Portugal

- IUCN category V (protected landscape/seascape)
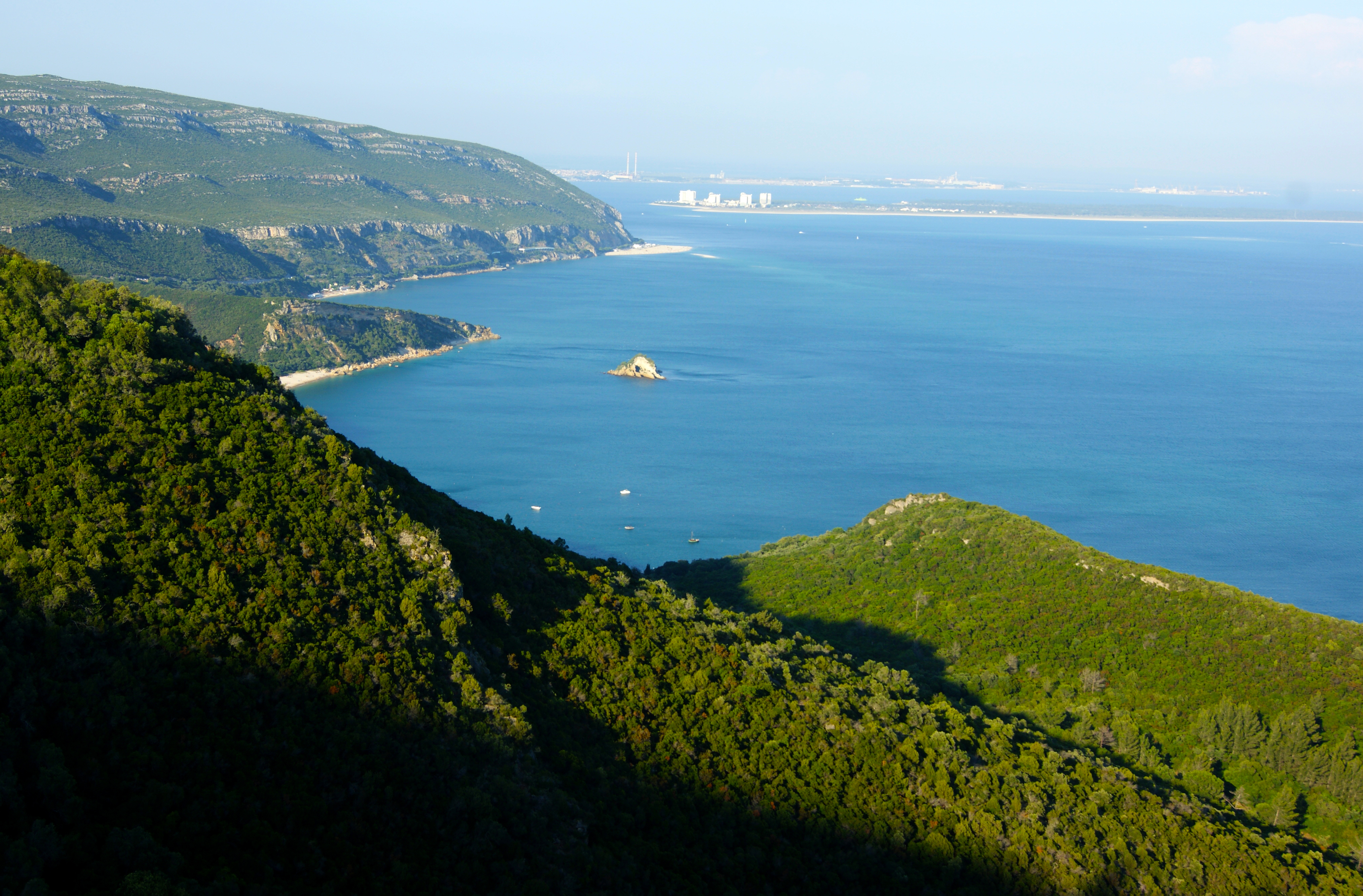
- A scenic view of the coastal part of Arrábida Natural Park

- Location within Portugal
- Location: Setúbal District, Portugal
- Coordinates: 38°28′53″N 8°59′21″W
- Area: 176.41 km^{2} (68.11 sq mi)
- Max. elevation: 501 m (1,644 ft)
- Established: July 28, 1976
- Visitors: 23,052 (in 2017–2020 (average))
- Governing body: ICNF
- Operator: Parque Natural da Arrábida Headquarters
- Website: www.icnf.pt/portal/ap/p-nat/pnar/class-carac

Arrábida Natural Park (Portuguese: Parque Natural da Arrábida) is a protected area in Portugal. Founded in 1976, the park occupies an area of 176.41 km^{2} (68.11 sq mi), (123.30 km^{2} (47.61 sq mi) on land and 53.11 km^{2} (20.51 sq mi) at sea, covering the southernmost margin of the Setúbal Peninsula.

One of the park's unique features is its carbonate geology mountain range, Serra da Arrábida (501 metres (1,644 ft)) which comes into contact with the ocean similarly to some locations in the Mediterranean, contrasting with the usual Portuguese coast (long sand beaches and cliffs)

Three of the park's beaches—Galapinhos, Portinho da Arrábida and Figueirinha—are popular among the inhabitants of Lisbon and Setúbal. Overlooking the three beaches is the Convent of Our Lady of Arrábida, a former monastery established in the 16th century, managed today by the Fundação Oriente.

== History ==
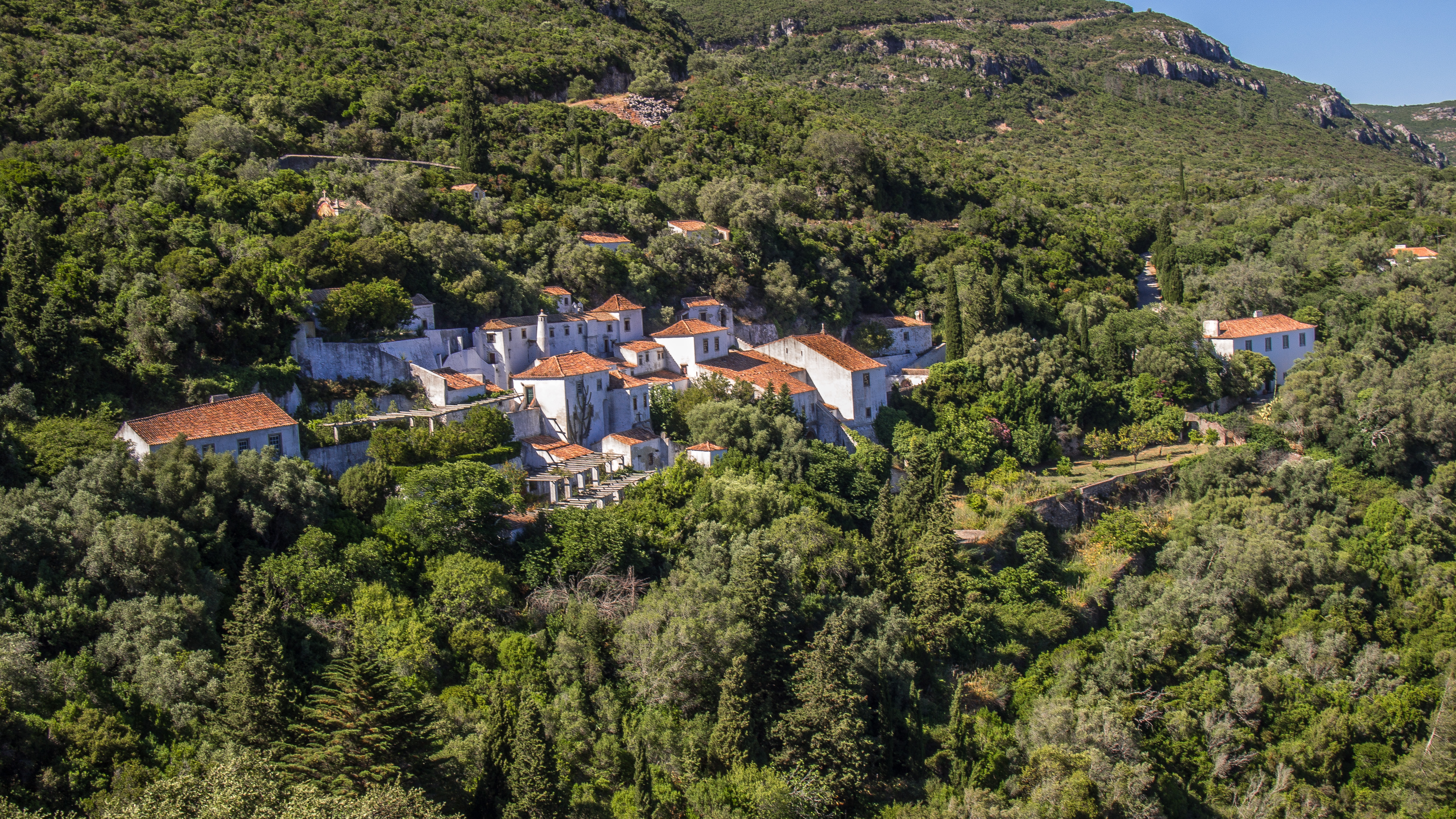
The isolated complex of buildings of the Convent of Nossa Senhora da Arrábida, surrounding by the endemic natural vegetation

The particular characteristics of the Arrábida massif, resulted (since the 1940s) in various attempts to protect the region, culminating in the creation of the Arrábida Reserve (Decree 355/71) on 16 August 1971, which covered the southern flanks of the mountains and cliffs of Risco. Recognizing the insufficient protection conferred on the area, Decree 622/76 was passed on 28 July 1976, creating the Parque Natural da Arrábida (PNArr). This classification envisioned the protection of the geological, forest, wildlife and landscapes, but also cultural and historical resources located within the area.

Regulating decree 23/98, passed on 14 October 1998, further reclassified the natural park, expanding its coastal area and establishing the Arrábida-Espichel Marine Area, in order to support the objectives of the park, especially in the area surrounding the park. This included the region's diverse marine flora and fauna, such as the discontiguous zone of Cabo Espichel, which was included to protect coastal cliffs, endemic flora species, nesting areas for marine birds and preservation of rudimentary fossils.

In 2025, the park was designated as a biosphere reserve by UNESCO.

== Geography ==
=== Physical geography ===
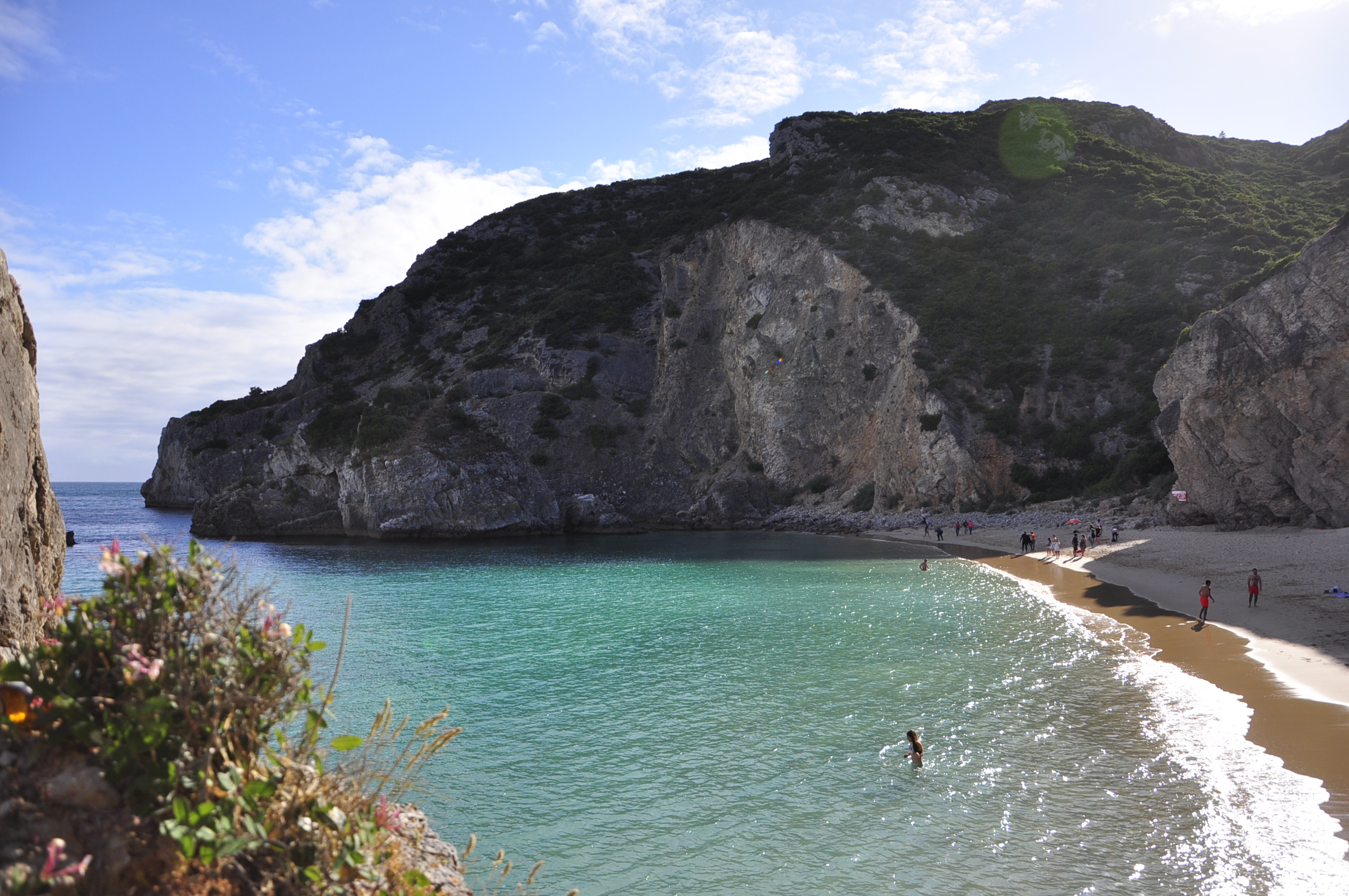
The rocky cliffs of the mountain range meet the ocean at Ribeiro do Cavalo beach.

The park is named for the main geomorphological unit that covers the entire area, designated the Arrábida cordillera or massif, consisting of three subareas:

- An area of small elevations around Sesimbra, associated with the Serra do Risco and Serra da Arrábida, consisting of hilltops between Outão and Setúbal;
- A zone between the Serra de São Luís and the Serra dos Gaiteiros; and
- An area formed by the Serras do Louro and Serra de São Francisco.

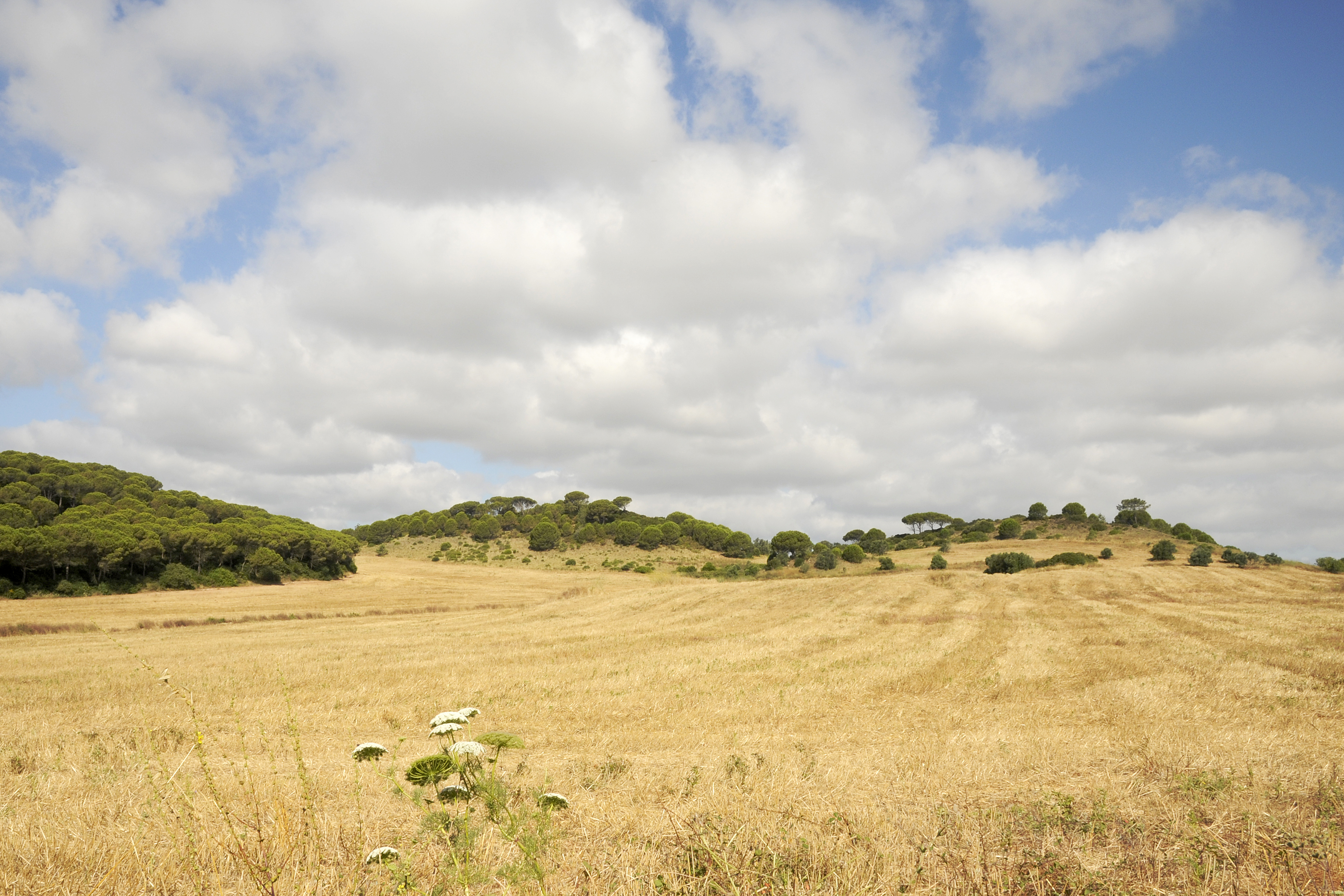
The interior plains on the northern edge of the Nature Park

This group is oriented east-northeast to west-southwest, covering an area of about 35 kilometres (22 mi) long and 6 kilometres (3.7 mi) wide, and reaching 501 metres (1,644 ft) at its highest altitude as a result of the Formosinho anticline. Arrábida was formed from four successive phases of rifting that resulted in the fragmentation of Laurasia and the formation of the north Atlantic. This area is unique in the Atlantic for demonstrating the western propagation of the Tethys sea and the formation of the Mediterranean, caused by the collision of the African plate and the Eurasian plate, during the Late Cretaceous. Geologically, the mountainous region was created during the Jurassic and Miocene epochs, while the plains formed during the Pliocene and Quaternary periods. Ribeiro (1935) indicates that the massif began to be formed with successive movements during the Tertiary era.

It is formed by three lines of dislocation, oriented more or less to the east, which succeeded a retreat from the southeast to northeast. This first area is represented by part of northern flanks of various anticlines; the second is formed by anticlines a little more inclined to the south, a third by folds and horizontal thrusts in the extreme east.

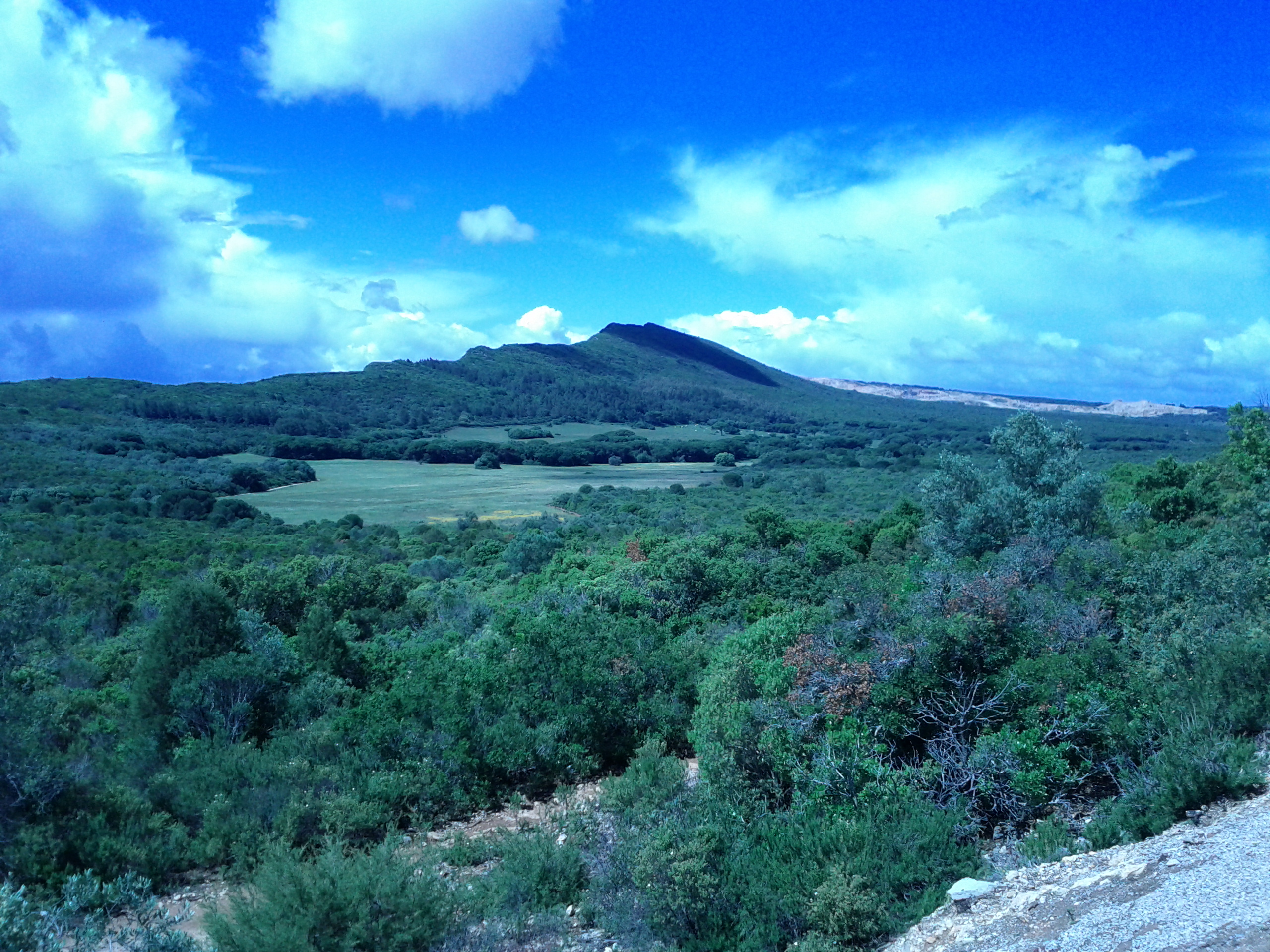
A view of the Serra do Risco near Sesimbra

The same author (1937) indicated that the peninsula of Setúbal was, during the Mesozoic, covered by shallow seas. During a great part of the Jurassic, Arrábida was a marine ecosystem covered by ocean, resulting in the formation of Dolomite limestones, today being constituted by white limestone. From the Jurassic there was a movement of submersion, that formed "alternating layers of limestone, sandstone and breccia, with a clear angular unconformity on the previous limestone that ministered part of the material". The sedimentary breccia is a valuable ornamental stone, more commonly known as Arrábida Marble.

Among the notable geomorphologic points-of-interest are the Morro de Palmela, at 232 metres (761 ft), the Montes de Azeitão, that include the Serra do Louro, at 254 metres (833 ft)) and the Serra de São Francisco 257 metres (843 ft)). Parallel to the Serra do Louro, and more to the south, is the Serra de Gaiteiros, at 226 metres (741 ft), to the southwest the Serra de São Luís, at 395 metres (1,296 ft) and to the southeast the Serro do Viso at 168 metres (551 ft). Along the coast lies the Serra da Arrábida, with its highest point at 499 metres (1,637 ft) (Formosinho). Over the sea and abrupt cliffs are the Serra do Risco and Píncaro, the highest point along the Portuguese coast in this area, at approximately 380 metres (1,250 ft). These mountains are constituted by limestone, with frequent rocky outcroppings forming scenic cliffs. Arrábida is dotted by karst cavities, that include the Gruta do Frade, known for its uniqueness, rarity, diversity and scenic beauty. From a paleontological perspective there are fossil deposits that include fragments of dinosaurs (normally sauropods), relevant to scientific investigation, commonly associated with Cape Espichel.

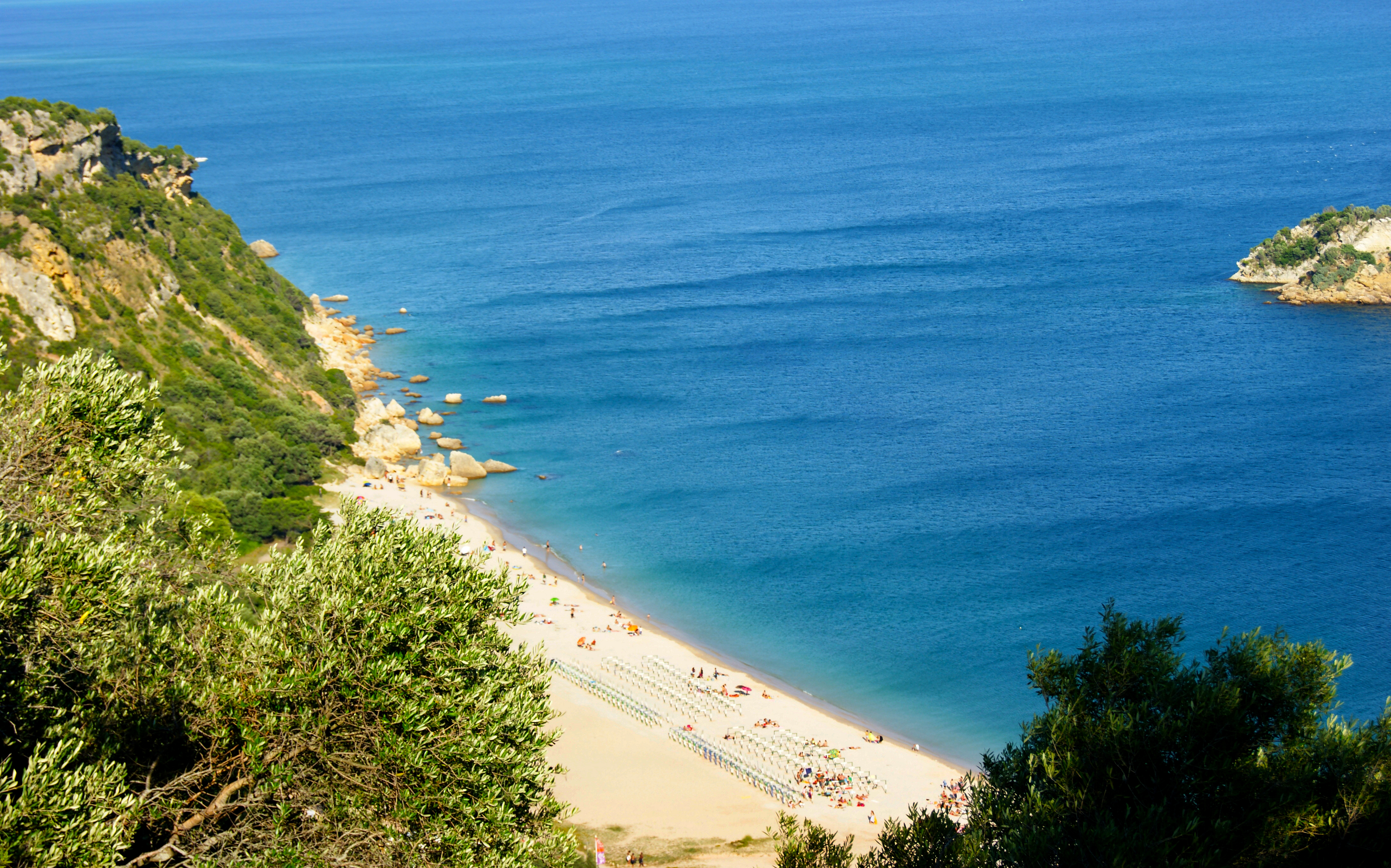
The beach of Figueirinha along the southern coast

There are also valleys of important interest, including south of the Serra de São Francisco up to Aldeia Grande, and the valleys of Barris and Alcube. Between the Serra da Arrábida and the western Montes de Azeitão, lies the Picheleiros Valley, which continues from the Ribeira da Ajuda Valley to Várzea da Comenda. There is also the Solitário Valley, between the coastal flanks of Arrábida and the Cabeços do Jaspe and Guincho, and the Vitória Valley, in the subplateau of the Serra do Risco. The coast stretching from Sesimbra to Alpertuche is more varied and elevated than the one from Sesimbra to Cape Espichel. The coast, generally elevated and abrupt, is 380 metres (1,250 ft) at the Alto do Píncaro, with rare and small beaches and coves, mostly accessible by boat. From Alpertuche to Outão the coast is less elevated resulting in more beaches, such as the bay of Portinho or Chã da Anixa, a small platform only metres above the sea. But, generally, the lands are inclined, mainly along the north and south, but predominately along the coast. Slopes in these areas of the Serra da Arrábida, Serra de Ares, Serra de Riscoa and Serra de São Luís exceed 30%, including the Rasca Valley, Comenda, Alto da Madalena Valley until Portela da Sardinha and areas along the north and south of the Serra de São Francisco and Serra de Louro.

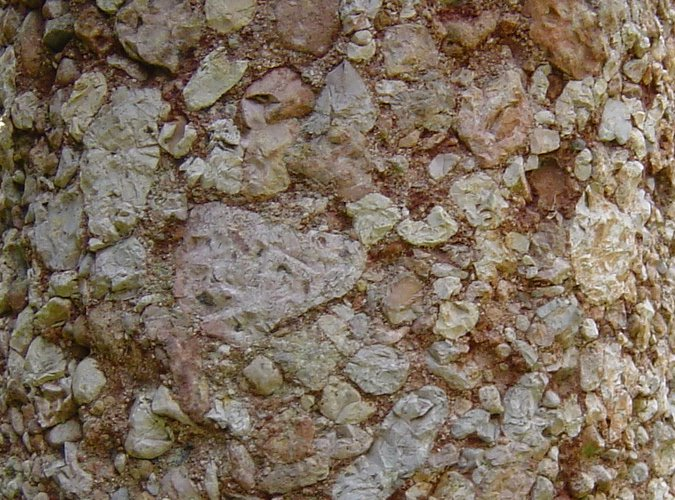
Samples of breccia from Arrábida

The waterways of Arrábida can be grouped into two principal types:

- Waterways that only run during the winter months (following an irregular course whose flow increases substantially during these months); and
- Perennial ravines that drain from the foothills throughout the year (with a longer, more stable course).

The hydrology of the park is divided into two great basins: one to the northwest and north, and another to the south and east. Although the main waterways are in the east, between Setúbal, Palmela and the Picheleiros Valley, the ravine of Ajuda is the highest flowing waterway, and results from the confluence of the Ribeiras de Alcube e do Picheleiro, Ribeiras do Almelão and Ribeiras de Pomarinho. This basin includes the valleys of Picheleiro, Alcube and Ajuda, and the western and southern flanks of the Serra de São Luís, as well as the western flanks of the Nico and Viso, in addition to the Ribeira de Melra, Ribeira do Vale de Cavalo and Ribeira de Mareta. Other waterways, such as the Ribeira da Corva, tributary of the Ribeira de Livramento, or the Ribeira do Calhariz, tributary of the Rio Coina, obtain their maximum flow outside the park. Of all these waterways within the park, only the Ribeira da Ajuda maintains its flow throughout the year.

=== Climate ===
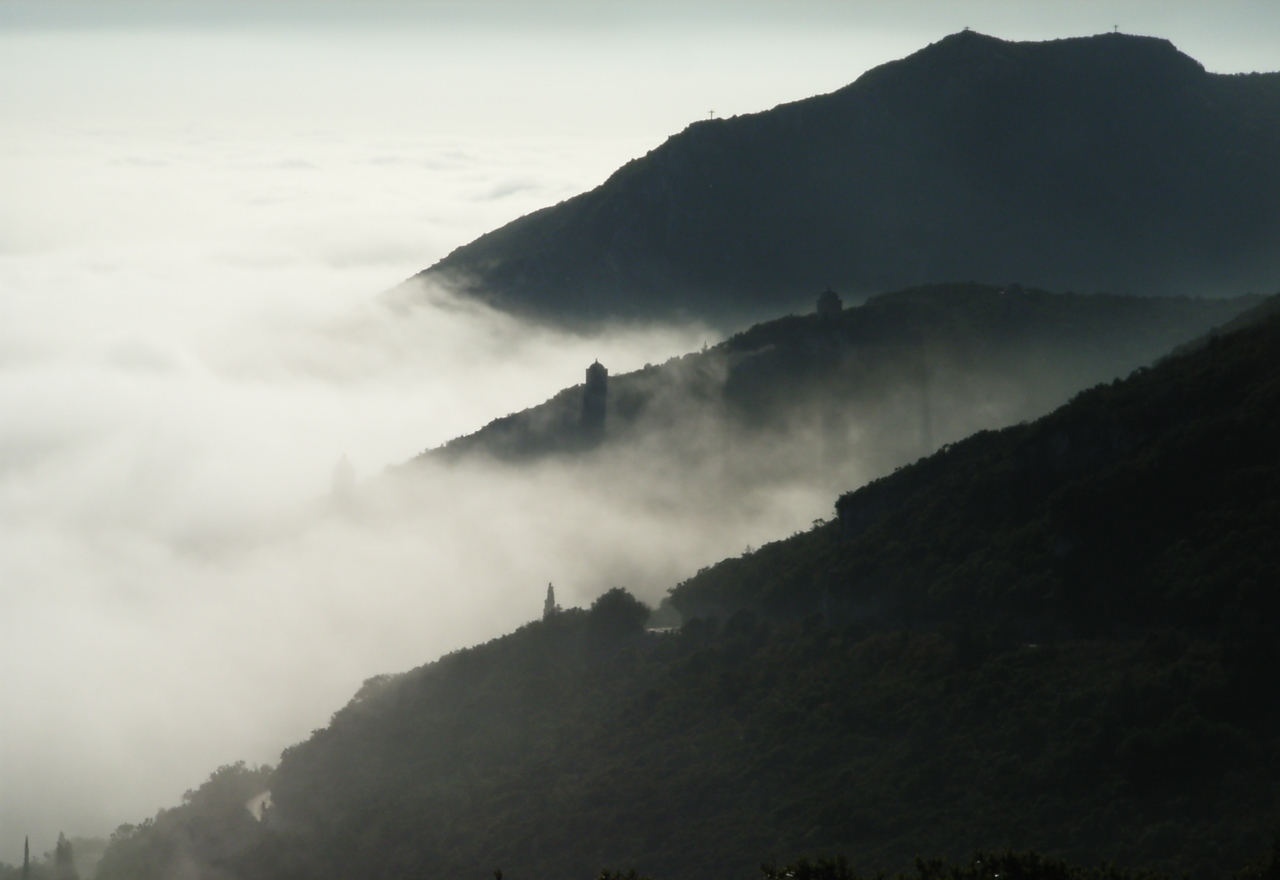
The mountainous southern coast, susceptible to morning fog due to moisture coming from the Atlantic Ocean

Arrábida has a Mediterranean climate with warm dry summers and mild wet winters. Its exposure to the Atlantic Ocean has a large influence over the temperature and the humidity felt throughout the year. The humid air masses that come from the Atlantic in the cooler months are confronted by the rugged mountains resulting in abundant precipitation in November and December. In the summer, some upwelling occurs around Cabo Espichel which decreases sea temperature and increases the frequency of fogs, which are usually only present in the morning or late in the day.

August is the warmest month with temperatures averaging between 24–28 °C (75–82 °F) during the day and 16–17 °C (61–63 °F) during the night. January is the coolest month with temperatures averaging between 13–15 °C (55–59 °F) during the day and 5–8 °C (41–46 °F) during the night. These temperatures depend on altitude and proximity to the sea.

=== Biome ===
==== Flora ====
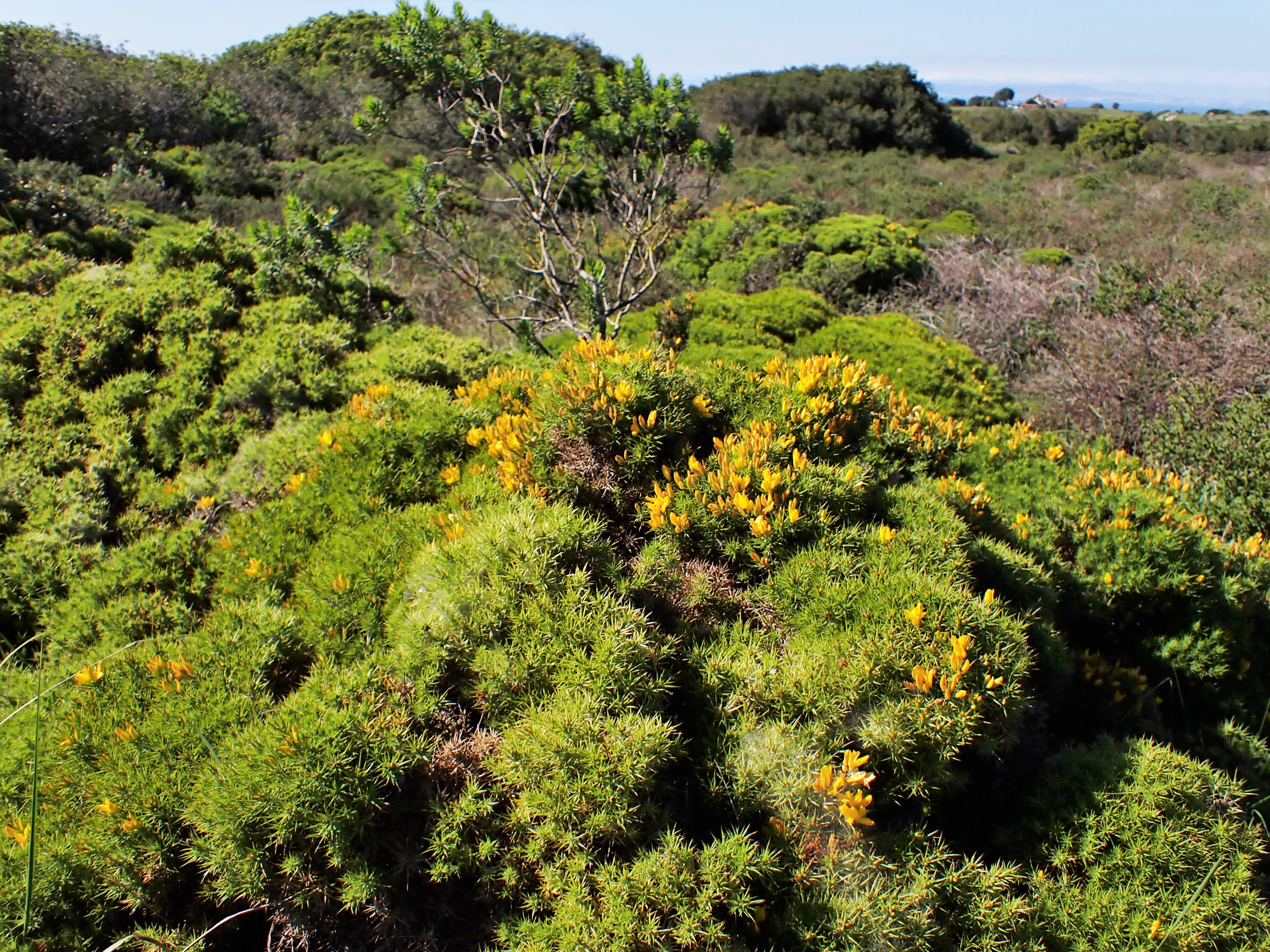
The Arrábida Natural Park is one of the few places in Portugal where the Portuguese endemic Ulex densus occurs.

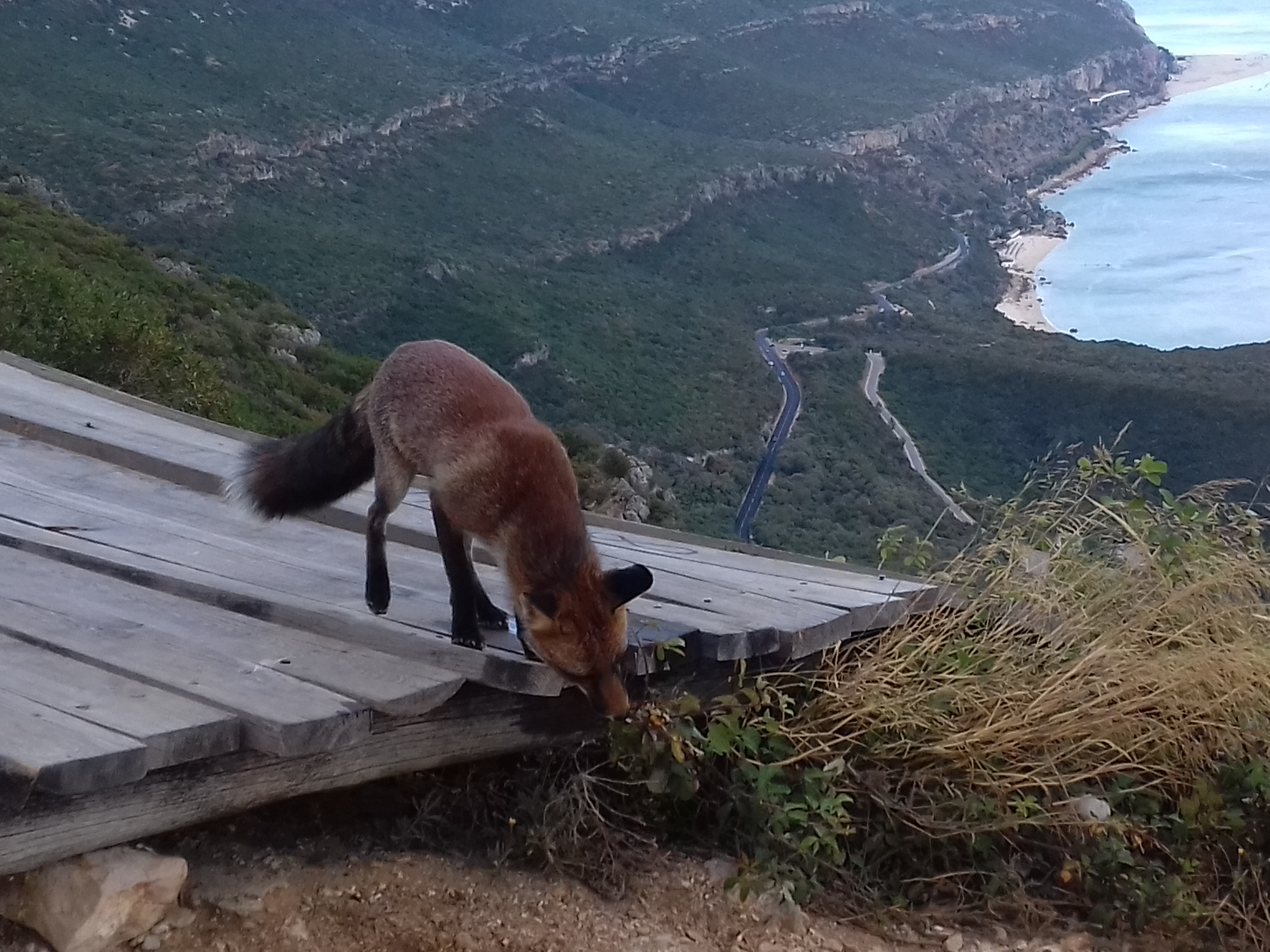
Red fox

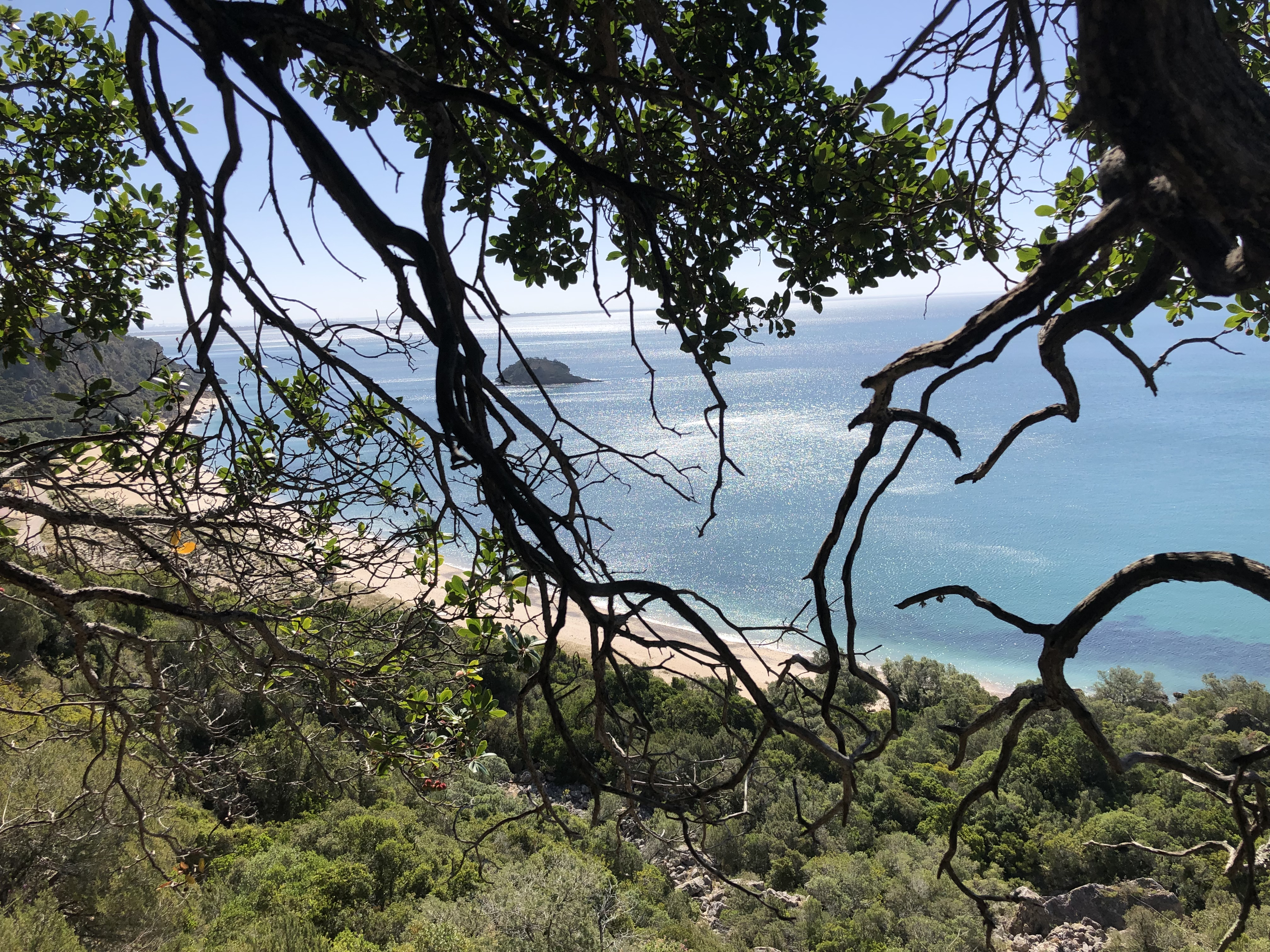
Arbutus unedo branches within Mediterranean forests, woodlands, and scrub

The morphology of Arrábida allows a variety of microhabitats of distinct characteristics (Mediterranean/Atlantic), mixing species of evergreen, deciduous or semi-deciduous trees. Owing to the importance of the natural vegetation, that includes the last vestiges of varying Mediterranean vegetation, the area was included in a planning process early on, in order to save and preserve the ecosystems. There are three convergent floral elements:

- Euro-Atlantic vegetation, with dominant exposures to the north, cooler humid or shaded areas;
- Mediterranean vegetation, with dominant exposures in the south, warmer, dry or luminous areas;
- Macaronesian vegetation, occupying the accidented maritime lands and arribas.

In the more eastern areas, the cliffs were populated with important species of Macaronesian flora, supporting nesting species of maritime and raptor birds protected by international convention.

==== Fauna ====
In total there are 213 species of vertebrates: 8 amphibians, 16 reptiles, 154 birds, and 35 mammals.

=== Ecoregions and protected areas ===
Arrábida concentrates a vast area of diverse vegetation, that includes 42 types and subtypes of habitats, 10 prioritized as important for conservation.

- Atlantic coast maritime dune habitat, with herbaceous vegetation (grey dunes);
- Atlantic coast maritime dune habitat, with decalcified vegetation (Calluno-Ulicetea);
- Mediterranean coastal dune habitat, with forest of stone pine (Pinus pinea) or maritime pine (Pinus pinaster);
- Mediterranean arborescent thickets of bay laurel (Laurus nobilis);
- Rupicolous calcareous or basophilic grasslands of the Alysso-Sedion albi
- Semi-natural dry meadows and scrublands on limestone (Festuco-Brometalia);
- Substep grasslands and Thero-Brachypodietea annuals;
- Rocky slopes with chasmophytic vegetation and limestone slabs
- Temperate alluvial forests of common alder (Alnus glutinosa) and European ash (Fraxinus excelsior)
- Low formations of spurge (Euphorbiaceae), that include Euphorbia pedroi

The complexity and diversity of marine habitats present in the waters of Arrábida have contributed to it being a hotspot of biodiversity, with 1400 registered species occupying the space.

== Popular culture ==
A stretch of road in the natural park is notable for being the scene in the 1969 James Bond film On Her Majesty's Secret Service where Tracy Bond (played by Diana Rigg) is shot dead by Irma Bunt (Ilse Steppat) in a drive-by shooting at the end of the film.

Arrábida is depicted in the video game Tom Clancy's Endwar as one of the theatres in World War III, when the U.S. Army invades Portugal in an attempt to weaken the European Federation's defences.
