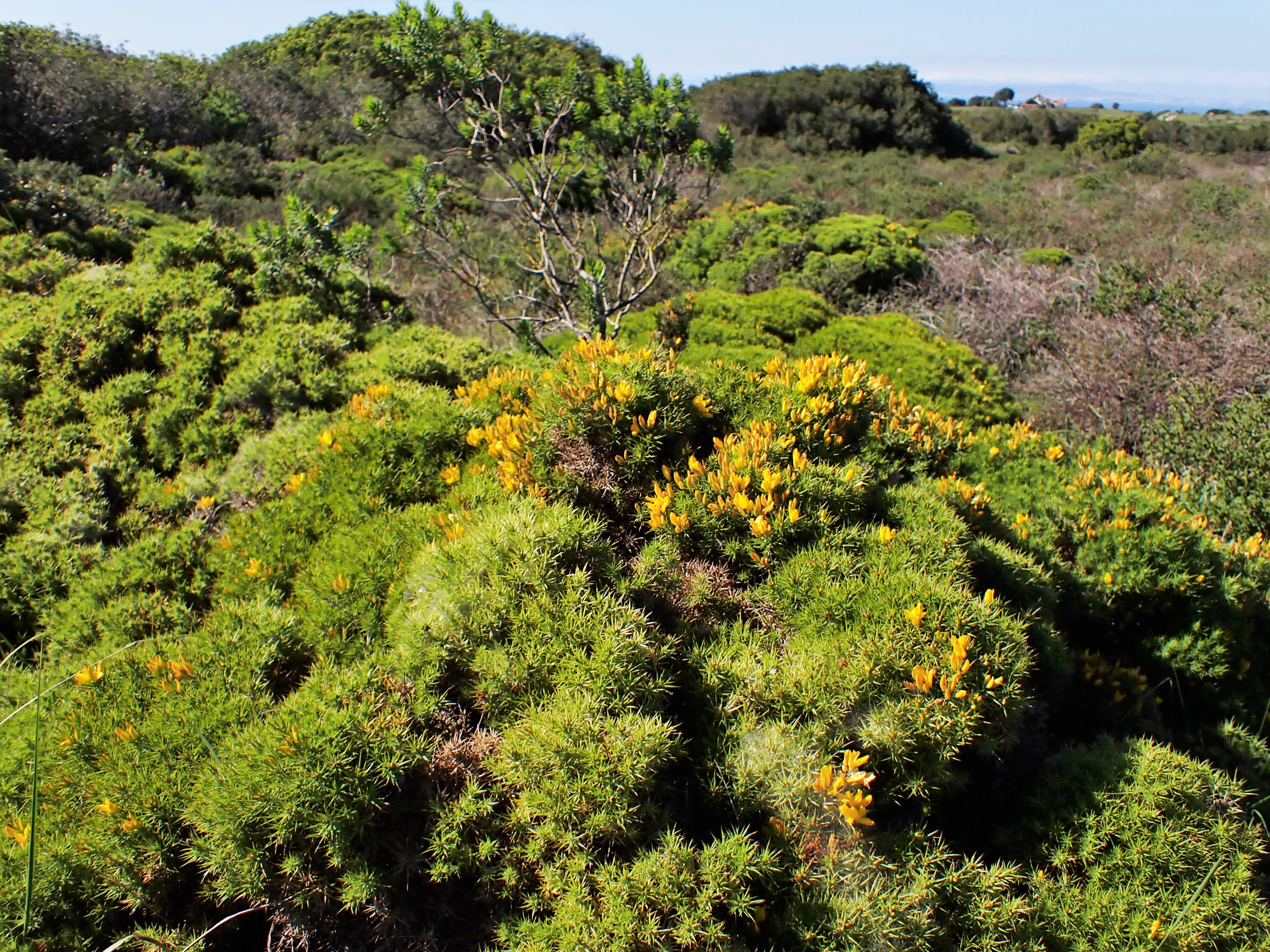

Conservation status
- Least Concern (IUCN 3.1)

Scientific classification
- Kingdom: Plantae
- Clade: Tracheophytes
- Clade: Angiosperms
- Clade: Eudicots
- Clade: Rosids
- Order: Fabales
- Family: Fabaceae
- Subfamily: Faboideae
- Genus: Ulex
- Species: U. densus

Binomial name
- Ulex densus Webb

= Ulex densus =

Species of plant in the legume family

Ulex densus (Portuguese: tojo-gatunho or tojo-da-charneca) is an evergreen shrub in the family Fabaceae endemic to Portugal.

== Description ==
Ulex densus is an evergreen shrub up to 0.5 m (1.6 ft) in height. It is densely ramified and forms a compact, closed pillow with dry brown stems and a bright green outside. It has spines up to 3 cm (1.2 in) long and secondary spines up to 1.5 cm (0.59 in). Fruits are as large as the plant's calyx and have 1-2 seeds.

== Distribution and habitat ==
Ulex densus grows in the central-west coast of Portugal, mainly on the Lisbon District, southern Leiria District and in the Arrábida Natural Park. It lives in woods and cliffs along the coast, but also Quercus forests (Quercus rotundifolia and Quercus suber) more inland, from sea level to 250 m (820 ft) altitude and prefers limestone substrates.

== Threats ==
It is mainly threatened by quarries, urbanisation, industrial or commercial areas, communication networks, trampling, overuse and natural fires.
