= Setúbal Peninsula =

Peninsula in Portugal

Coordinates: 38°35′N 9°00′W

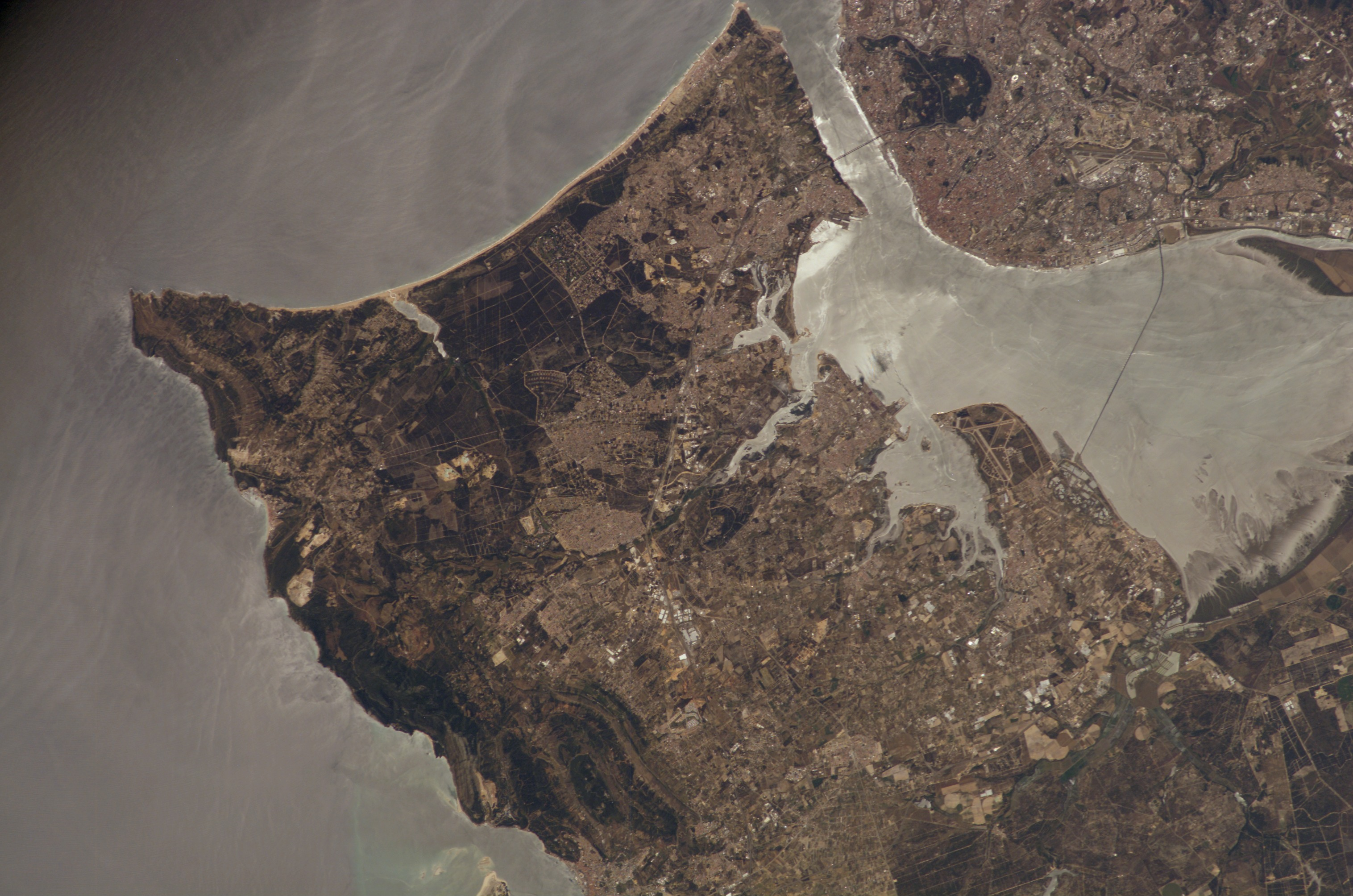
Satellite view of the Setúbal Peninsula

The Setúbal Peninsula (Portuguese: Península de Setúbal) is a peninsula in the Lisbon Region of Portugal. The peninsula is named after one of its larger cities, Setúbal, and is bordered by three bodies of water, the Atlantic Ocean in the west and southwest, the Tagus Estuary to the north and the Sado Estuary to the southeast.

The region can be divided into two different orographic zones: the mountainous southwest, formed by the Arrábida mountain range, cut by valleys and hills, with altitudes between 100 and 500 m (330 and 1,640 ft), and the remaining extensive flat areas, part of the Tagus floodplain.
