= Siege of Santarém (1171) =

Siege of Santarém during the Portuguese Reconquista in 1171

- Part of the Reconquista
Date	1171
Location	Santarém, Kingdom of Portugal
Result	Portuguese victory

Belligerents
Kingdom of Portugal	Almohad Caliphate

Commanders and leaders
Afonso I of Portugal	Abu Yaqub Yusuf

Strength
Unknown	20,000

The Siege of Santarém was the failed siege of the Portuguese city of Santarém by the Almohads in 1171 during the Reconquista. It was the first time that Santarém was attacked since its conquest by King Afonso I of Portugal, 24 years earlier.

== Background ==
Located at the top of a steep slope next to the Tagus River, Santarém was considered one of the most difficult cities to conquer in western al-Andalus. However, it was captured in a surprise attack by Afonso in 1147. Santarém’s walls were surreptitiously scaled at dawn and the city was conquered before its garrison could organize an effective defense.

In 1169, Afonso and his ally, Gerald the Fearless, besieged Badajoz, the largest and most important city in western al-Andalus. Alarmed by this attack, the Almohad Caliph Abu Yaqub Yusuf sent an army of 20,000 men commanded by Abu Hafs to the Iberian Peninsula, hoping that the city had not yet fallen to the Christians. When Abu Hafs arrived in Seville, however, the Portuguese had already withdrawn. Abu Hafs then took his army to Córdoba and from there he sent a detachment commanded by Ibrahim Ben Hamushk to Badajoz, who subsequently invaded Portugal in 1170.

== Siege ==
The following year, the Caliph himself traveled to al-Andalus with an army of 10,000 Almohads and 10,000 Arabs. The Caliph crossed the Strait of Gibraltar in the summer and reached Seville on 8 June. From Seville, the Muslim army invaded Portugal through the Alentejo and, without encountering much resistance, advanced to Santarém, which they besieged. At that time, during the siege, Afonso, the King of Portugal just happened to be within the city.

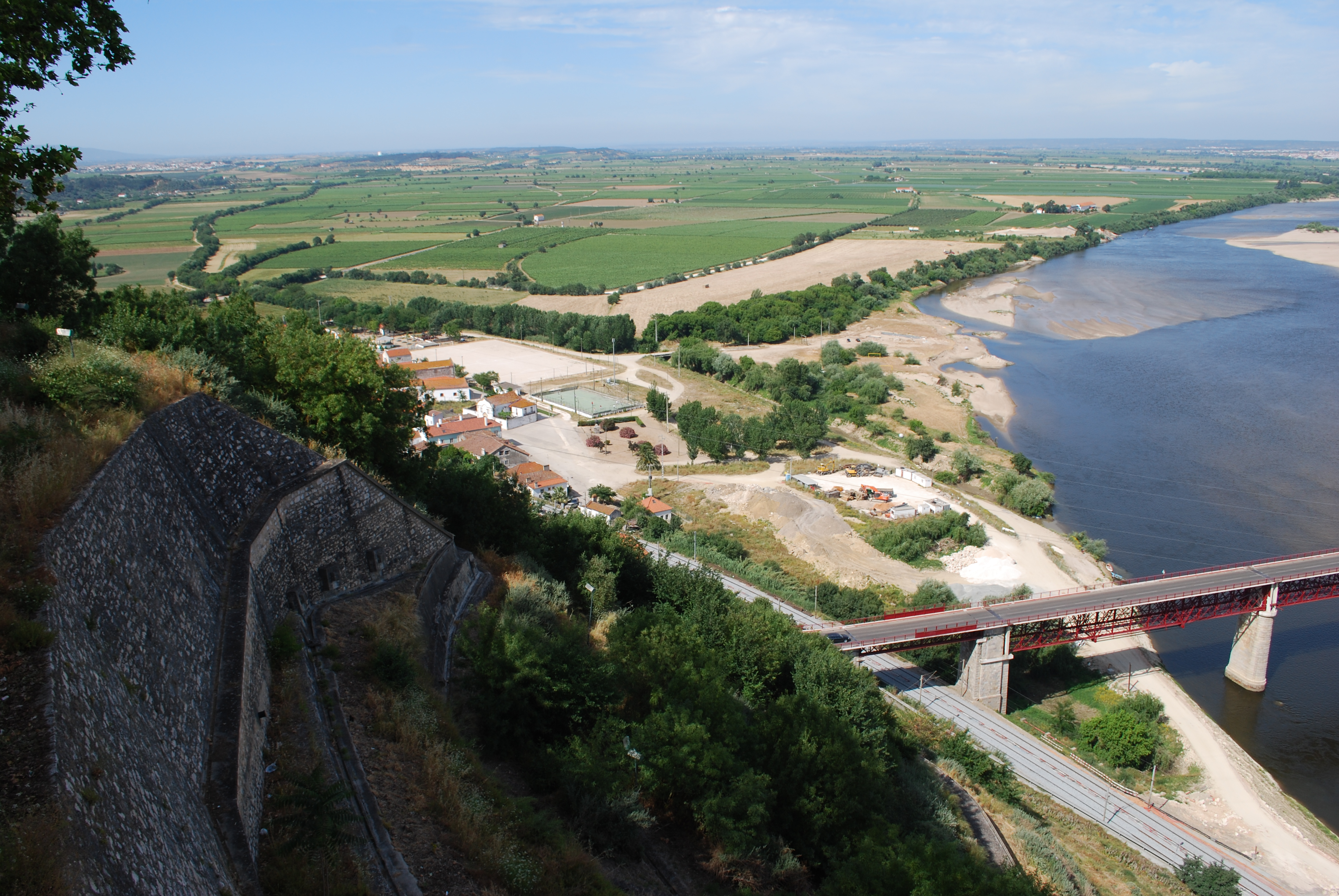
View of the walls of Santarém

The Almohads expected that the King of León would refrain from helping Afonso I due to past grievances between the two, but upon learning of the siege of Santarém, Fernando set out with his army to assist Afonso. When Afonso learned of the approach of the Leonese, he was unaware of their intentions and believed that Fernando would be assisting the Muslims. As a result, Afonso sent messengers to ask for peace.

The news that the Leonese were coming to help the Portuguese spread among the Muslims as well, who lifted the siege and retreated to Seville, conquering Alcântara from the Leonese along the way.

== Aftermath ==
Although the Almohads failed to retake Santarém, their massive invasion demonstrated a renewed threat to Portugal. As a result, Afonso, who at that time was elderly and physically weakened from injuries sustained at the Siege of Badajoz in 1169, with limited resources, needed a truce to consolidate his gains and stabilize a vulnerable southern frontier. The Almohads also needed a pause to address internal revolts in North Africa.

As a result, Afonso and the Almohads signed a five-year truce in 1173. During the truce, Afonso stabilized his political position and fortified Portugal's defensive positions associated with the Tagus line.

The Templars, as an ally to Portugal, used this period to conduct an extensive program of renovation and construction of the Order's castles associated with the Tagus line. Castles build or remodeled between 1171 and 1174 include the castles at Almourol, Pombal, Penas Róias, Longroiva, Soure, Monsanto, and Cardiga.

During this time, the Templars introduced a number of design innovations for these fortifications including the addition of keep towers or (torre de menagem); alambors (sloped base of a wall); and hoardings. These innovations spread throughout Portugal and were considered essential to the defence of the territory. The enhancements were thought to "mirror the excellence of the military architecture of the Portuguese Templars, largely due to the actions of their most emblematic and influential master, Gualdim Pais, who was at the forefront of the order's destinies throughout of almost forty years (1156-1195)."

The siege of Santarém in 1171 was only the first of three sieges that would be imposed on Santarém by the Muslims. The Almohads besieged the city again in 1184 and 1190.

== See also ==
- Portugal in the Middle Ages
- Portugal in the Reconquista
- Siege of Badajoz (1169)
- Siege of Santarém (1184)
- Military history of Portugal
- Castle of Santarém
- Almohad wars in the Iberian Peninsula
