= Knights Templar in Portugal =

Political Organisation

The presence of the Knights Templar in Portugal can be traced from 1128 until their dissolution in the 14th century.

Having played a key role during the Portuguese Reconquista by taking, settling or defending the territory from the Muslims, the Order was an influential organisation in Portugal and valuable partner to the Portuguese Crown. Unlike elsewhere in Europe, it suffered no persecution at the time of its dissolution, its members and property in Portugal being instead transferred by King Denis to the Order of Christ, created specifically for this very purpose.

== History ==
Shortly after their creation, the Templars settled in Portugal in 1128, having been granted the frontier Castle of Soure on March 19, 1128 by Countess Teresa. The official act of donation took place in Braga, in the presence of Raymond Bernard, recruited by Hughes de Payens during his trip to Europe, possibly one of a small group of Templar scouts to seek donations for the Order.

This was a time of political tension in Portugal and just a few months afterwards Teresas heir Afonso Henriques revolted with the support of the Portuguese nobility and wrested control of the county at the Battle of São Mamede.

Afonso did not oppose the presence of the Order in the territory, he sought to involve it in the Reconquista efforts against the Muslims to the south and officially confirmed the donations granted by his mother.

The Templars quickly grew in numbers and influence during their first sixteen years in Portugal through the recruiting of local new members or the acquisition of property. Their first known military engagement in Portugal took place when the Muslim qaid of Santarém attacked Soure in 1144. The knights made a sortie, however they were defeated and the castle was pillaged, numbers being then taken to captivity. In 1145, the Templars were granted the castle of Longroiva by Afonso Henriques' sister and her husband Fernão Mendes de Bragança.

The Templars participated in Afonso Henriques conquest of Santarém, taken in 1147 during the night.

The Order was later granted the lands of Ceras by King Afonso, with a castle that was in ruins at the time. This donation was of strategic importance because Ceras lied close to the border, its castle defended a major road that linked Lisbon to Coimbra and it featured fertile grounds where an important settlement effort could be undertaken. Instead of renovating the ruined castle, the master of the Templars in Iberia Gualdim Pais commenced the construction of the formidable new castle of Tomar from the ground up, on March 1, 1160. It featured a number of innovations taken from castles in the Holy Land, where Pais had previously travelled to. Two years later Pais granted the town of Tomar a charter.

Gualdim Pais and the Templars were responsible for introducing a number of key innovations in fortification to Portugal, namely keeps (first attested in Tomar in 1160, in Almourol in 1171, in Pombal in 1171, in Penas Róias in 1172, in Longroiva in 1174, in Soure between 1171 and 1175), sloped walls, and hoardings (first attested in Longroiva in 1174).

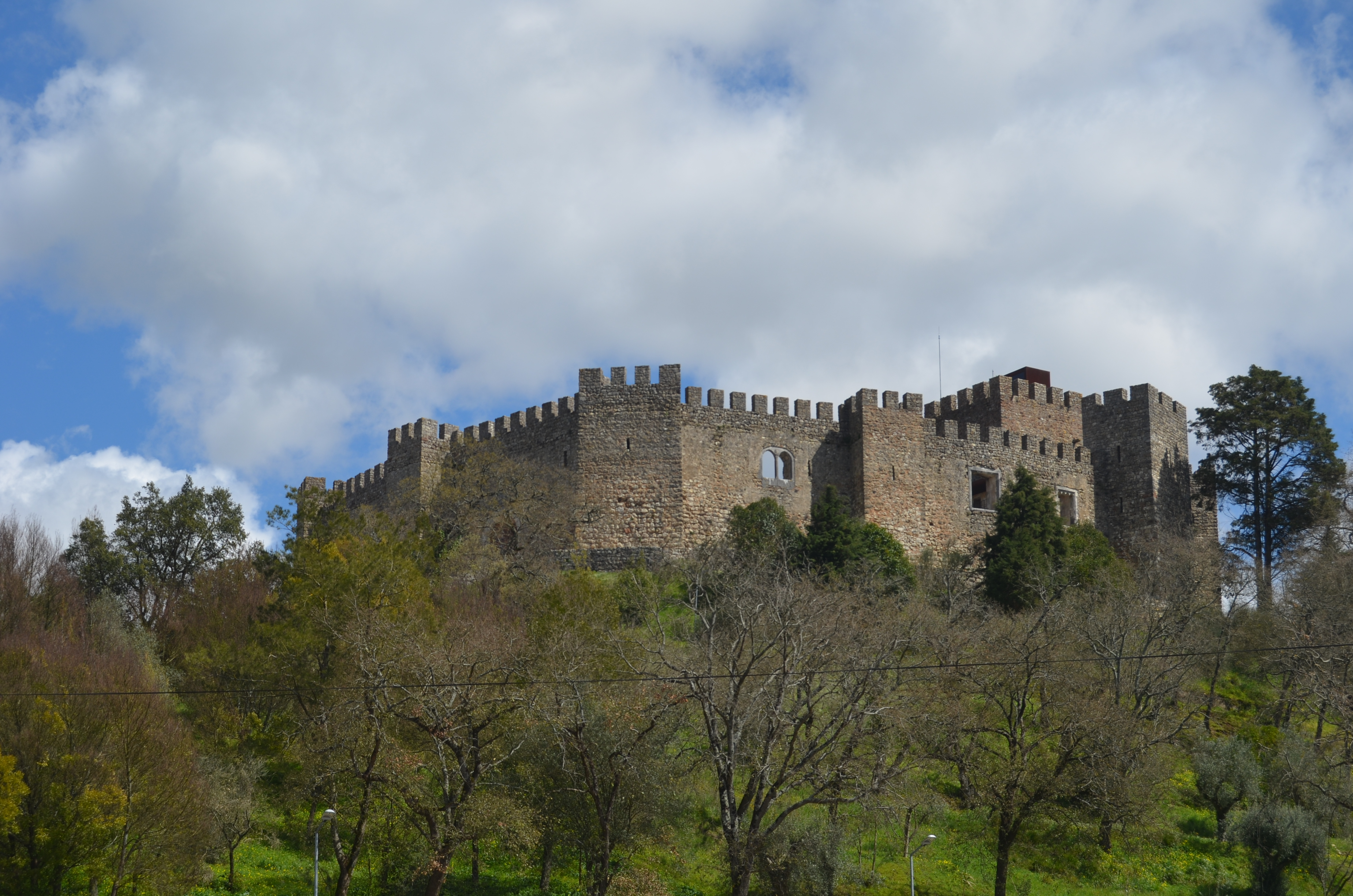
The Templar castle of Pombal

The military importance of the Templars matched their importance in settling and developing new lands. Most their domains were deserted when the Order took possession of them due to the ravages of war. The Order passed town charters and promoted the settlement of lands. The military Orders in Portugal, namely the Templars later adopted comparable economies of scaled and employed notably advanced methods of production such as the irrigation system introduced by the Templars in the Zêzere River valley. Surplus production was sold into urban markets.

The Order had a vital and strategic role in the defense of the southern Portuguese frontier against the Muslims between 1160 and 1217. In November 30 of 1165, the castle of Monsanto was granted to the Order by king Afonso, although it would pass to the Order of Santiago in 1172. Dom Gualdim Pais promoted the renovation of Almourol Castle in 1171. During the great Almohad campaigns against Portugal they resisted a strong Muslim attack in 1190 when Tomar was sieged by the Almohads, commanded by the Caliph in person.

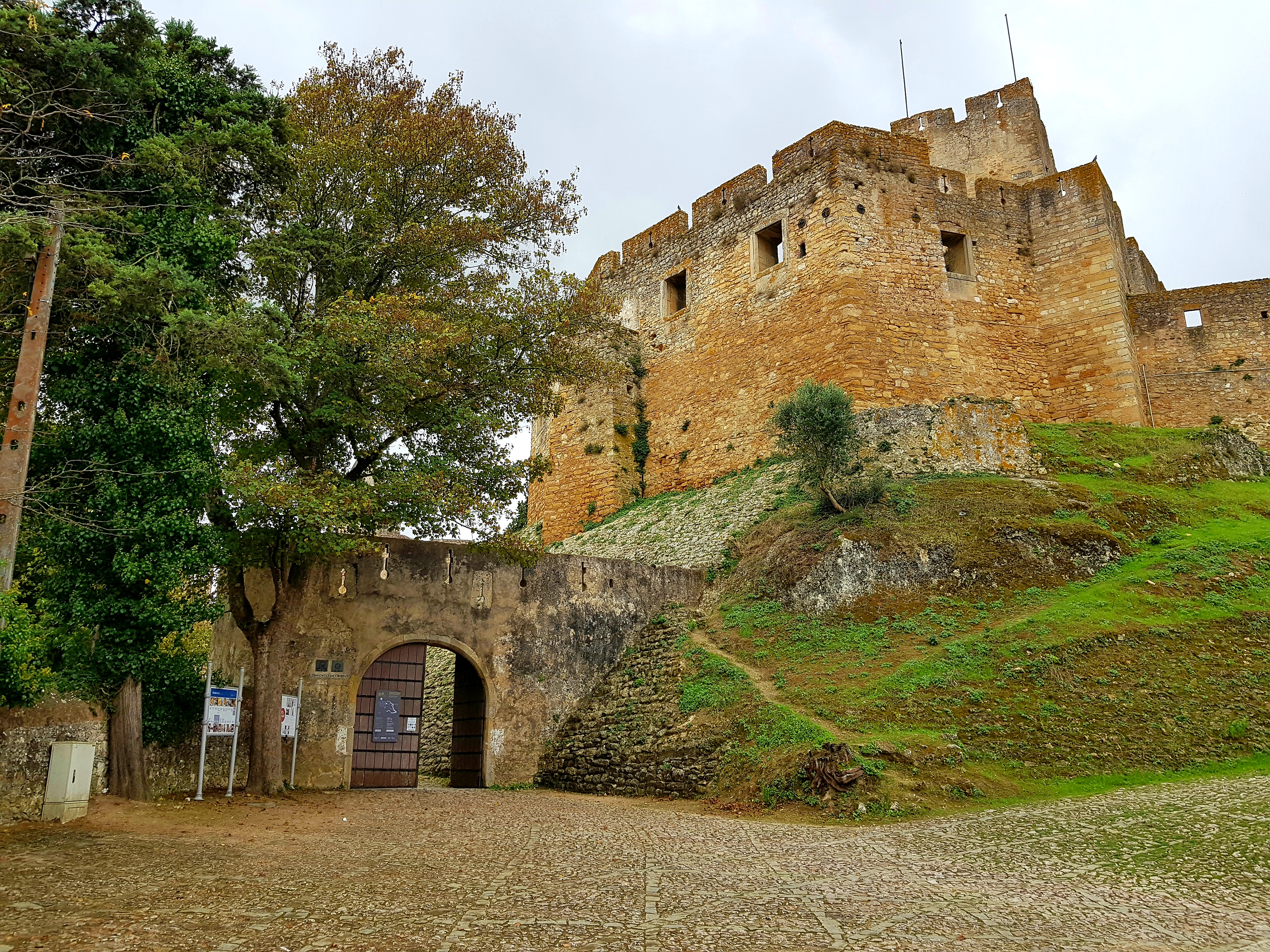
Castle of Tomar

King Sancho I of Portugal, known as "the Settler", was a major patron of the Templars and during his reign the Order was granted important stretches of land, such as the lands of Açafa in 1199, where Castelo Branco was founded. Idanha-a-Nova was founded in 1205 or 1206 and delivered to the Templars.

In 1212, a number of Portuguese Templars and other volunteers from the urban militias participated in the great Battle of Navas de Tolosa under the command of preceptor Gomes Ramires. The Templars took part in the conquest of Alcácer do Sal to the south of Lisbon, promoted by the Bishop Soeiro of Lisbon.

The Templars in Portugal, Leon and Castile were initially commanded by the same preceptor. When prince Sancho of Castile rebelled against his father king Alfonso X in 1282, many Templars in Portugal took the side of the king, while the Castilian Templars took the side of the prince-heir momentarily. After the death of the (Portuguese) preceptor João Fernandes in 1288, Templar command in Portugal was separated from the other two kingdoms, the result of an effort by the Portuguese Crown who was often at war with Leon and Castile.

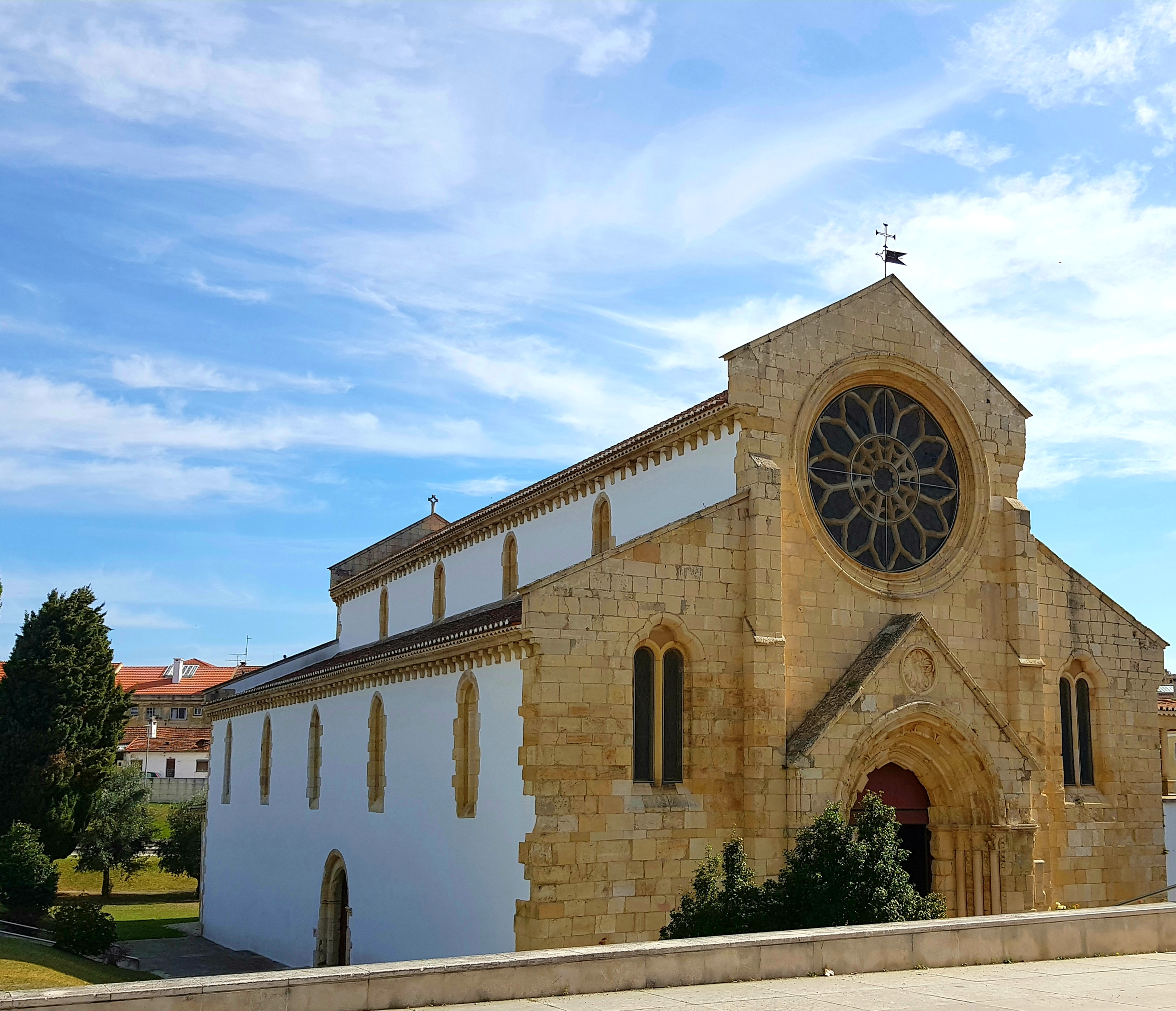
The Church of Santa Maria do Olival in Tomar, final resting place of several masters.

The process of dissolution of the Templars in Portugal and the creation of the Order of Christ which would replace them began when Pope Clement V ordered the investigation and confiscation of Templar property in Iberia in 1306. Unlike Ferdinand IV of Castile who promptly appropriated Templar property, King Denis of Portugal hesitated in carrying out the Papal order, and only did so in 1309 in the face of growing claims by a number of clergymen with disputes against the Order. The following year, in January 31, 1310, the king signed a mutual pact with Ferdinand IV of Castile and Jaime II of Aragon should the Papacy decide to appropriate Templar property for the Church.

Faced with united opposition in Iberia, the Pope instead ruled in favour of transferring Templar property to the Hospitallers but King Denis objected to this as well, not only because a foreign Hospitaller command could be disadvantageous to fight the Muslim threat from north-Africa but also because the large amount of border fortifications that would be concentrated in the hands of the Hospitallers could mean a strategic risk for Portugal.

Clement V was succeeded by Pope John XXII, who proved favourable to the proposal to create a new Order that would replace the Templars in Portugal. Denis' delay in confiscating Templar property for himself was decisive in securing the good will and approval of the Pope.

The new Order of Christ was made official by the Papal bull Ad Ea Exquibus on March 14, 1319. Denis then granted the Order "all castles, properties and goods" belonging to the Templars while Gil Martins was appointed as its first grandmaster. Transference was seamless. Many knights joined the new Order, with no arrests having been effected or recorded. The last master of the Templars in Portugal Dom Vasco Fernandes ended his days as commander of Montalvão on the eastern border, "a fate vastly different than Jacques de Molay". Fernandes and many former members henceforth added quondam miles Templi to their signature, "at one time knight of the Templars".

== Templar sites in Portugal ==
=== Castles ===
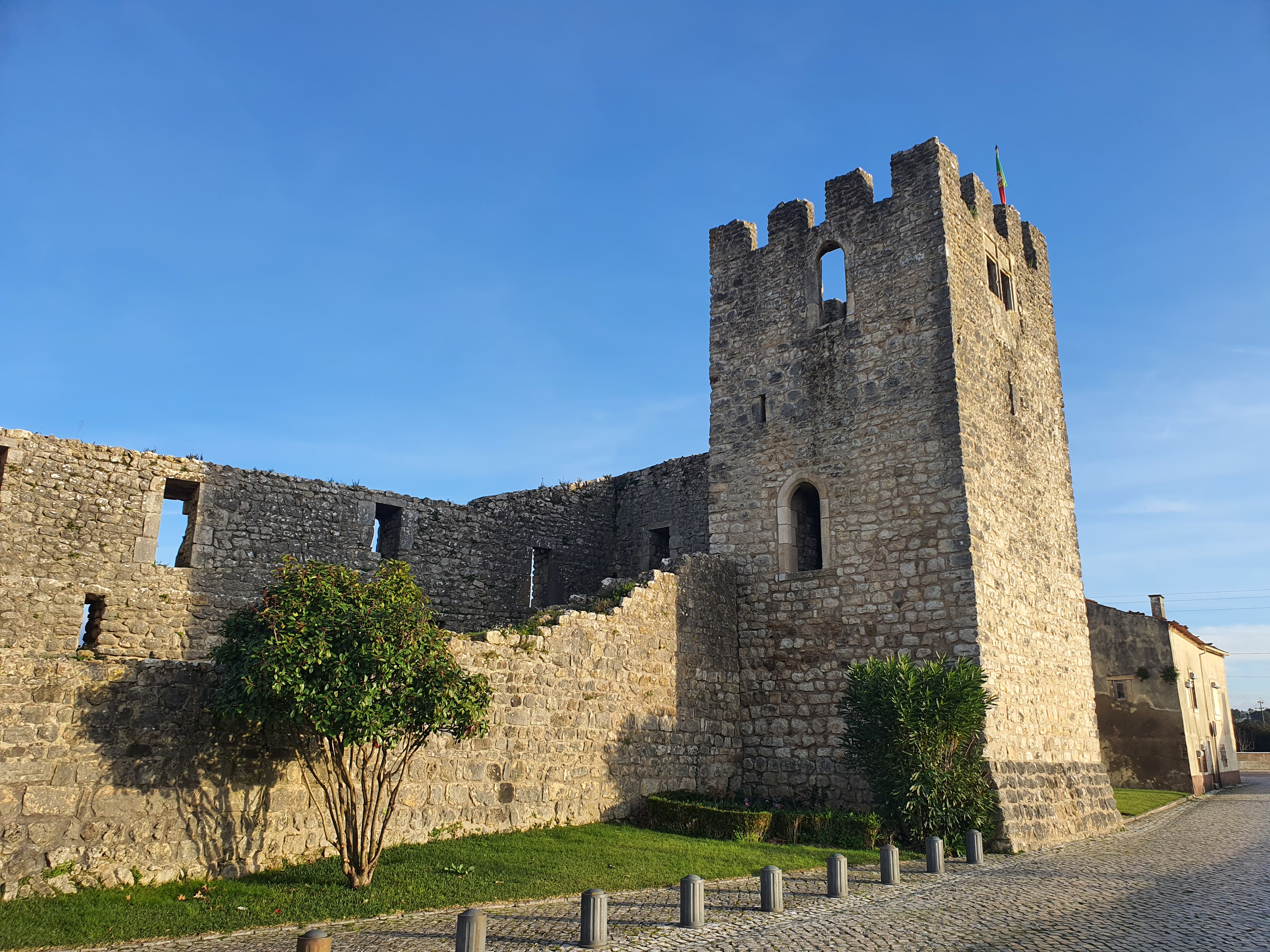
The Castle of Soure

- Castle of Soure
- Tomar Castle
- Castle of Castelo Branco
- Castle of Pombal
- Castle of Penas Róias
- Castle of Ega
- Castle of Mogadouro
- Castelo of Longroiva
- Castle of Ródão
- Castle of Castelo Novo
- Castle of Penha Garcia
- Castle of Almourol

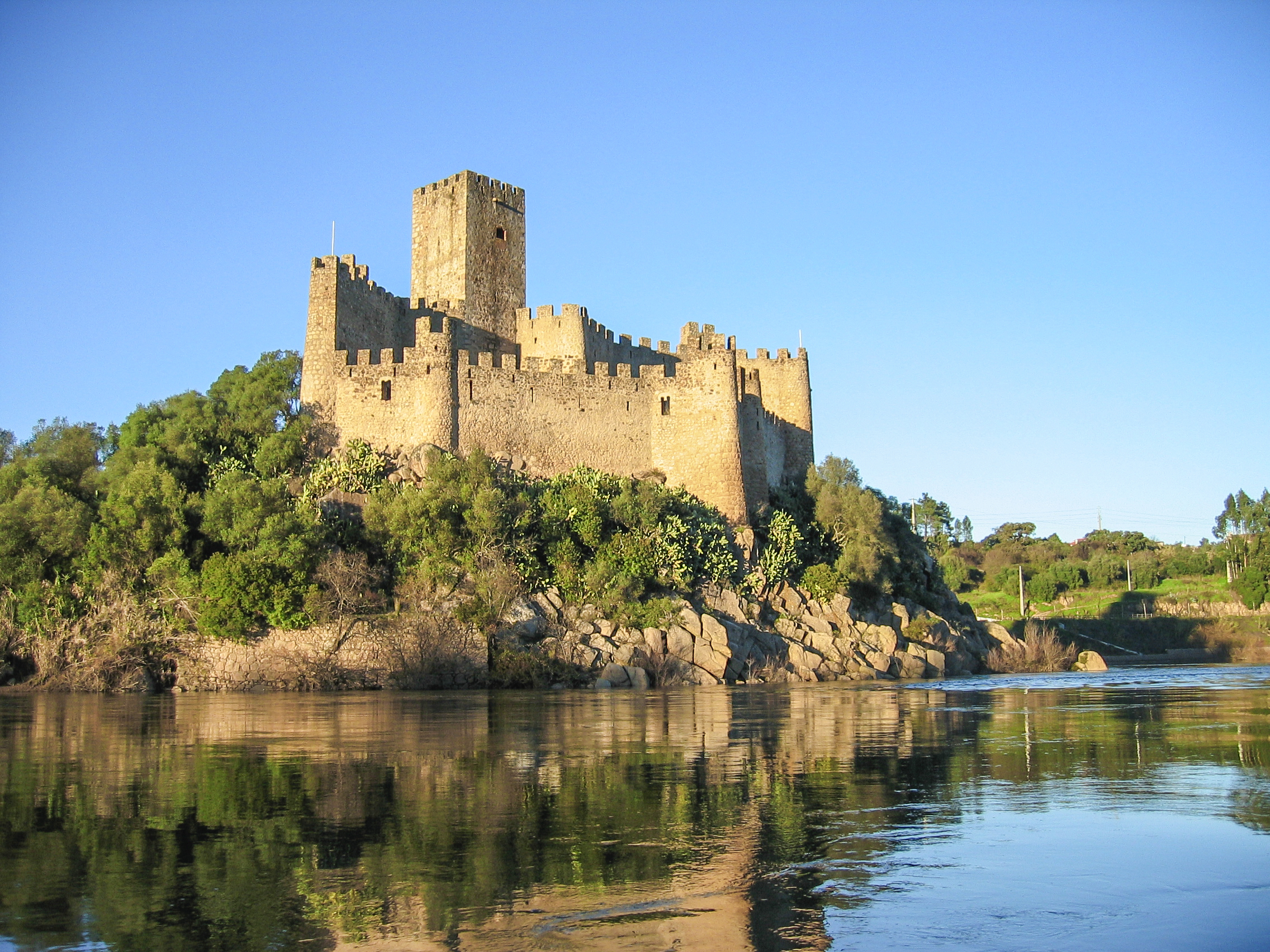
The Castle of Almourol.

- Castle of Montalvão
- Castle of Redinha
- Castle of Nisa
- Castle of Alpalhão
- Castle of Zêzere
- Castle of Cardiga
- Castle of Vila do Touro
- Castle of Segura
- Castle of Monsanto
- Castle of Salvaterra do Extremo
- Castle of Rosmaninhal
- Castle of Penamacor
- Castle of Bemposta
- Castle of Proença-a-Velha
- Castle of Idanha-a-Velha
- Castle of Idanha-a-Nova
- Monsaraz Castle

=== Churches ===
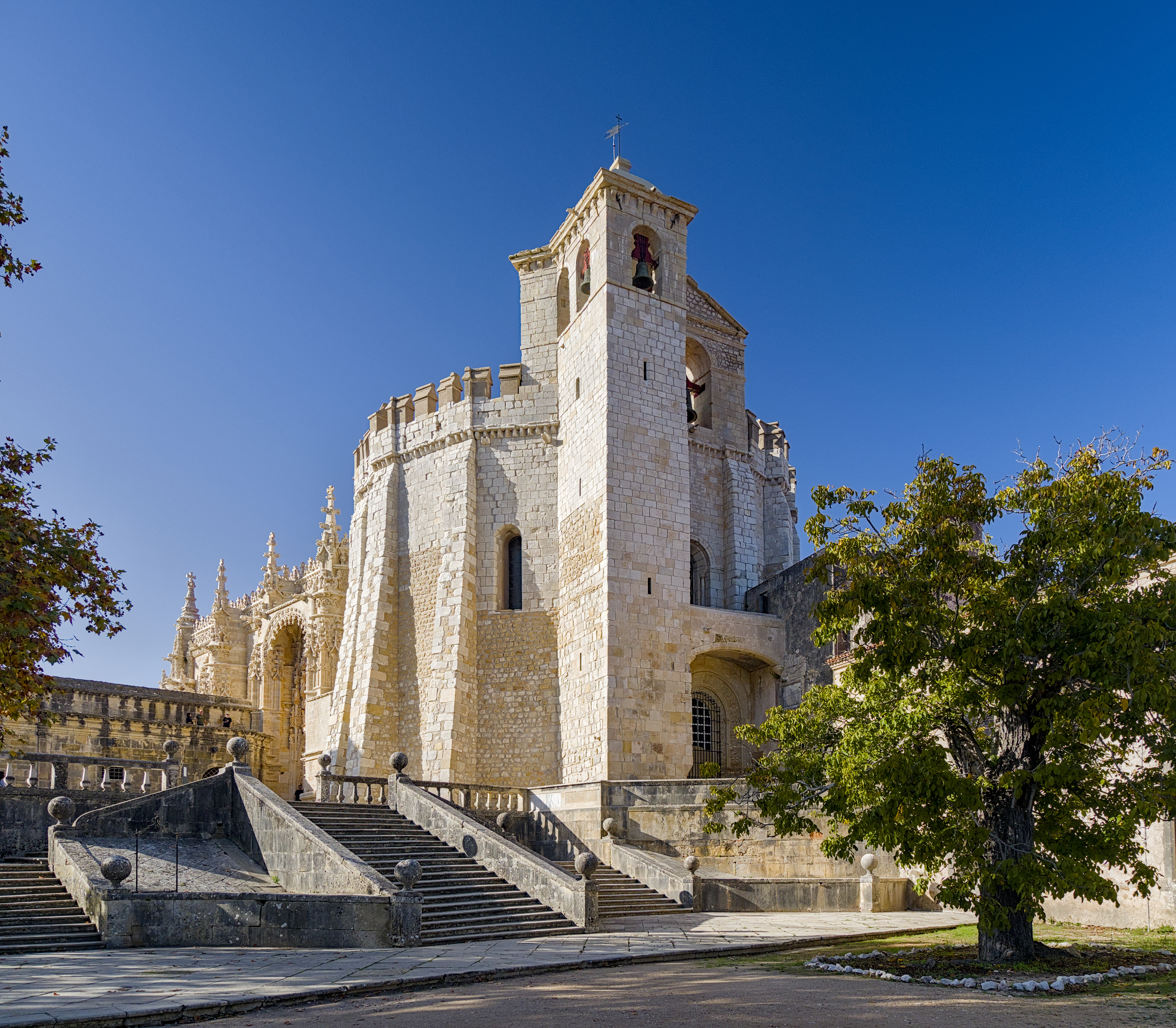
Templar round church at Tomar.

- Church of Santa Maria do Olival
- Church of Santa Maria da Alcáçova (Santarém)
- Church of Santiago de Antas
- Church of São João Evangelista do Alfange

== See also ==
- Portugal in the Middle Ages
- Timeline of Portuguese history (First Dynasty)
- Quinta da Regaleira
