= Siege of Santarém =

Siege of Santarém may refer to:

- Conquest of Santarém (1147), a successful siege of the city the Second Crusade
- Siege of Santarém (1171), an unsuccessful siege of the city by the Almohads
- Siege of Santarém (1184), an unsuccessful siege of the city by the Almohads

== See also ==
- De expugnatione Scalabis ('On the Conquest of Santarém'), an account of the conquest of Santarém in 1147
