= Idanha =

Idanha may refer to:

- Idanha, Oregon, a city in the United States
- Idanha, Portugal (disambiguation), several places in Portugal
