= Castelo de Monsaraz =

Castle in Portugal

Coordinates: 38°26′34″N 7°22′53″W

Castelo de Monsaraz is a castle in Reguengos de Monsaraz, Portugal. It is classified as a National Monument.

The construction works began after the Christian reconquest and extended for several reigns. Looking to increase the population and its defense, King D. Afonso III began the construction of the new alcazar and its five square towers.

== See also ==
- Portugal in the Reconquista
- Knights Templar in Portugal
