= Castle of Soure =

Portuguese castle

- Castelo de Soure
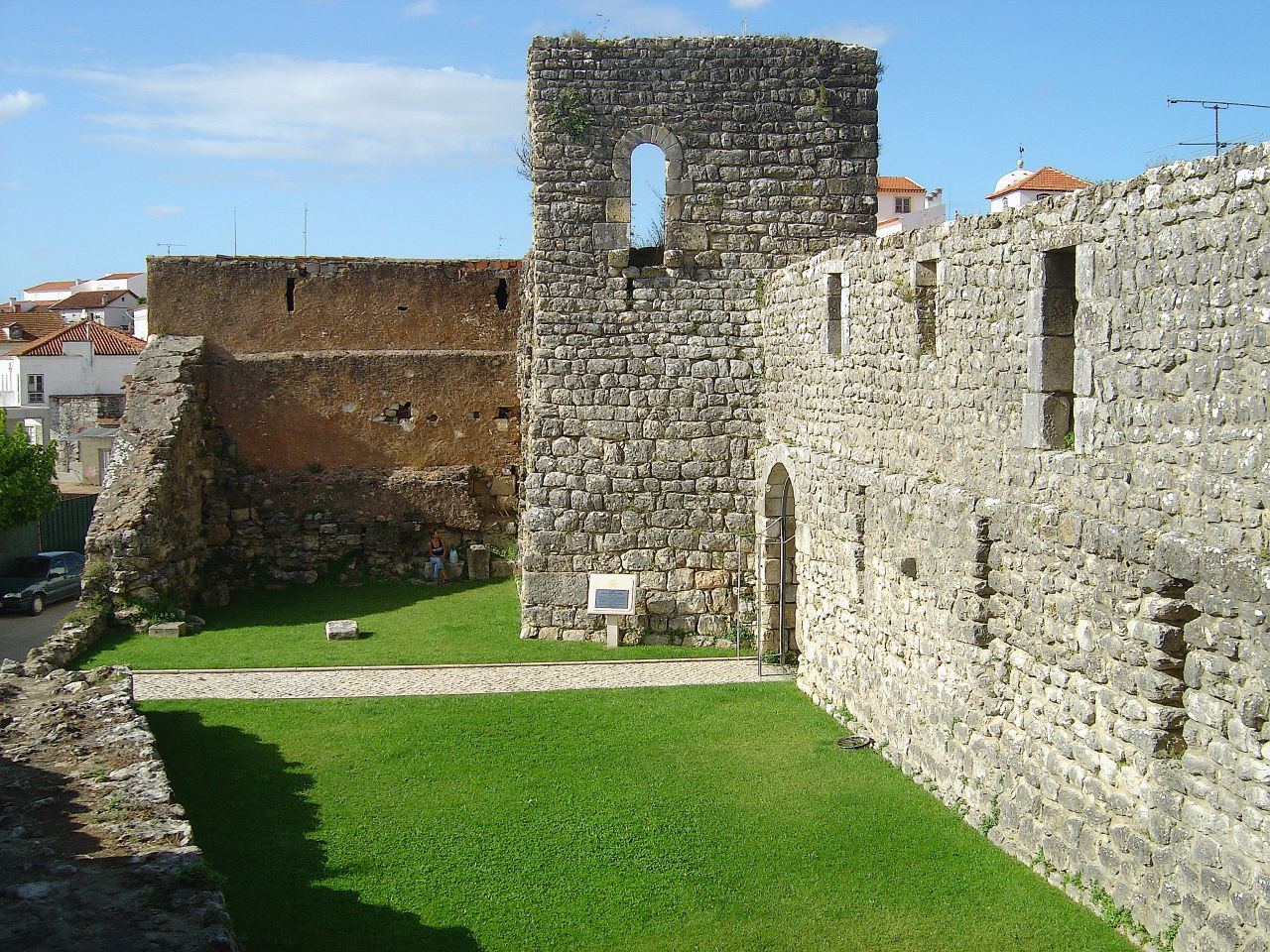

Location
- Location within Portugal
- Coordinates: 40.057°N 8.626°W

The Castle of Soure (Portuguese: Castelo de Soure) is a Portuguese castle in the civil parish of Soure, municipality of Soure, district of Coimbra.

It has been listed as a National monument since 1949.

== See also ==
- Portugal in the Reconquista
- Knights Templar in Portugal
