= Castle of Idanha-a-Nova =

Medieval castle in Portugal

Coordinates: 39.919812638466816°N 7.236523898340034°W

The Castle Idanha-a-Nova (Portuguese: Castelo de Indanha-a-Nova) is a medieval castle located in Idanha-a-Nova, in the District of Castelo Branco, Portugal.

== History ==
=== Early history ===
Under the reign of D. Afonso Henriques (1112–1185), the land surrounding the village and the castle were donated to Order of the Templar heritage land extended to Beira Baixa, with the donation of Idanha-a-Velha and Monsanto, D. Gualdim Pais, 6 Master of the Order in Portugal. It was issued a Foral Charter in a text by the sovereign on November 30, 1165.

Later, his son and successor, D. Sancho I (1185–1211), in 1197, confirmed the donation of Idanha-a-Velha to 7 Master of the Order, D. Lopo Fernandes, who added, in 1199, with the donation Herdade da Açafa. There formed a vast domain that stretched from Idanha term to the Belver.

=== Medieval era ===
Its structure follows the same architectural lines characteristics of the Knights Templar, the castles of Almourol, Monsanto, Pombal, Tomar and Zezere, his contemporaries.

King Sancho I (1185–1211) granted a foral charter in 1201 in order to encourage the settlement and defence of the land.

His successor, King Alfonso II (1211–1223), confirmed this charter in 1219, renaming the village with the current place names (Idanha-a-Nova), to distinguish it from the old Idanha (hereinafter Idanha-a -Velha), eighteen kilometers away. The village of Idanha-a-Nova has developed a lot since then, at the same time Idanha-a-Velha went into steady decline. In the late fifteenth century, King Manuel I (1495–1521), was surprised with the difference in the development of the two Idanhas (1496) and in June 1510, recognizing the progress of Idanha-a-Nova, granted him New charter. At this time, the town and its castle, including the layout, was recorded down by Duarte de Armas in his Book of Fortresses in 1509.

=== Post-middle ages ===
Over the years, the castle has been neglected and fell into ruin. The ruins of the castle prove to be a popular local tourist attraction.

It is classified as a National Monument.

== See also ==
- Idanha-a-Velha
- Knights Templar in Portugal
