= Castle of Bemposta =

Medieval castle in Bragança, Portugal

- Castelo da Bemposta
- Bragança, Alto Trás-os-Montes, Norte in Portugal
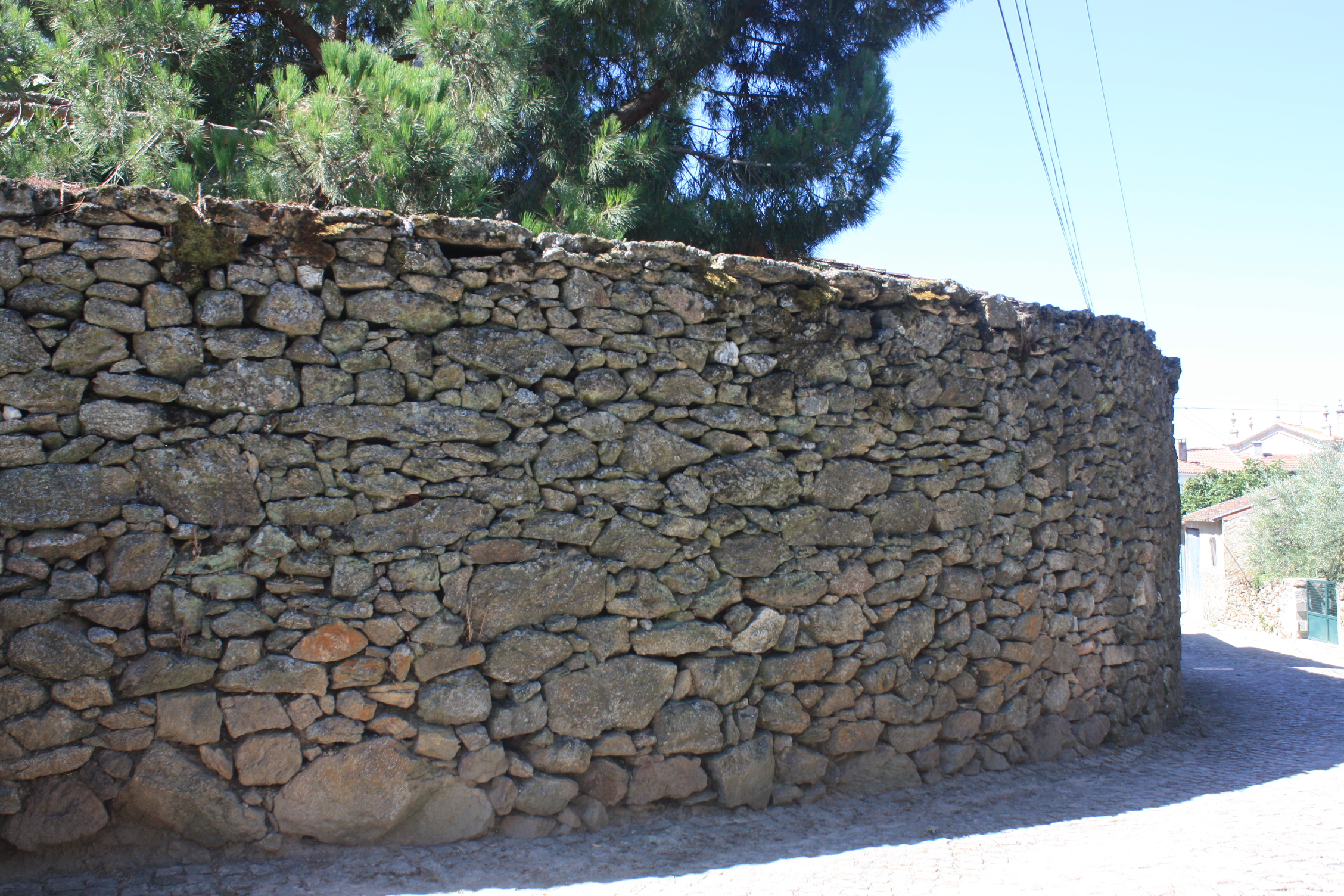
- Walls of the Castle of Bemposta

Site information
- Type: Castle
- Owner: Portuguese Republic
- Operator: Roman Catholic Diocese of Bragança-Miranda
- Open to the public: Public

Location
- Location of the castle within the municipality of Mogadouro
- Coordinates: 41.309167°N 6.503117°W

Site history
- Built: 14th century

The Castle of Bemposta (Portuguese: Castelo de Bemposta) (Mirandese: Castielho de Bempuosta) or Walls of Bemposta (Portuguese: Muralha de Bemposta) was a medieval fortification in the civil parish of Bemposta, municipality of Mogadouro, in the Portuguese district of Bragança. It was constructed in the 14th century to enclose the settlement and it fell into ruin by the 16th and 17th centuries.

Since 2021, this area has been classified as a Site of Municipal Interest.

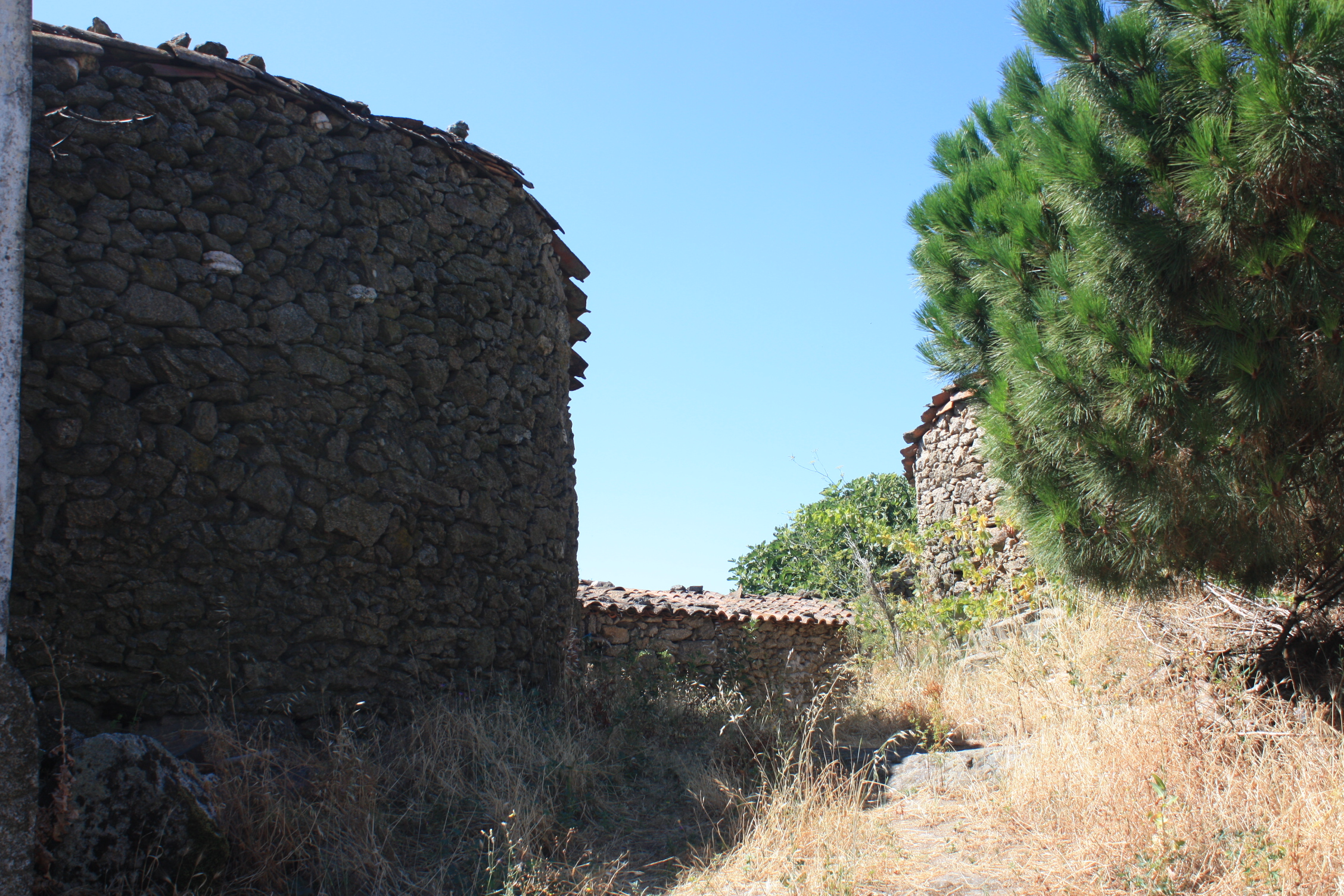
Walls of the castle of Bemposta

== History ==
The walls of Bemposta were built during the 14th century. King Dinis gave a royal charter (foral) to Bemposta in 1315 and ordered the construction of walls to surround the settlement. The walls were to have 352 metres (1,155 ft) in perimeter, with the walls following the same dimensions as those at Miranda, with two gates flanked by towers (cubelos). It should be built using stone and lime and a preexisting well would provide water to the enclosed settlement.

Construction of the walls was still ongoing in 1321, when Dinis granted Bemposta a charter of privileges. For six years, its inhabitants were allowed to pay the same rent they had previously paid as villagers of Penas Róias, rather than the double rent normally imposed on towns, in order to encourage the construction of the walls.

Bemposta was granted by the Portuguese crown to various nobles during the 14th century. In 1382, Fernando I granted Bemposta to Fernando Alfonso de Valencia, in recognition of his support. João I granted it to Gil Vasques da Cunha around 1385 for his assistance during the interregnum and to Rui Gonçalves Alcoforado in 1399, who passed it on to his son Martim Gonçalves Alcoforado in 1434.

In 1469, Vasco Fernandes de Sampaio, Lord of Vila Flor, purchased Bemposta from Rui Gonçalves Alcoforado, strengthening his lordship in the region. Vasco de Sampaio would later establish a morgadio in favour of his son, Fernão Vaz de Sampaio.

The castle of Bemposta fell into ruin around the 16th and 17th centuries. In 1507, a property assessment of the Order of Christ assesses its three houses inside the Castle of Bemposta as being in a state of ruin. Furthermore, in a 1530 census, it is noted that the Castle of Bemposta had started to fall into disrepair. By 1688, the castle had likely fallen into ruin, since a report to the Portuguese War Council noted that the town lacked defensive structures.

On 6 March 1758, Father José Camelo Borges noted in the Memórias Paroquiais that the town had a small wall that was referred to as a castle, where some of the residences lived. By 1797, Bemposta became the donatary captaincy of the Count of Sampaio.

In 2021, the walls of Bemposta were classified as a Site of Municipal Interest.

== Architecture ==
The Castle of Bemposta and its walls occupied a sub-oval area within the modern day Igreja, Prensa, Quartel and Olival Streets and the Igreja and Salina squares. It was designed to take advantage of the natural topography, following the rocky outcrop where possible. The castle walls had a perimeter of around 340 metres (1,120 ft) and a varying width of around 3 metres (9.8 ft) on average, though the original maximum height is unknown. Some remains of the original, somewhat irregular granite masonry survive in the southern part of the village. The walls featured two main gates, one faced west, towards the parish church's square, while the other faced Salina square. In addition, a postern may have existed in the modern day Quartel Street.

Within the castle area, there is a series of underground galleries, called Inferno da Bemposta. These can be accessed through an old portal within the ruins of what was probably an olive press and one of the galleries leads to a tunnel reportedly opening onto a yard on the southern side of the wall, near Olival Street.

== See also ==
- Knights Templar in Portugal
