= Castle of the Moors =

Medieval castle in Sintra, Portugal

- Castelo dos Mouros
- Lisbon, Greater Lisbon, Lisbon in Portugal
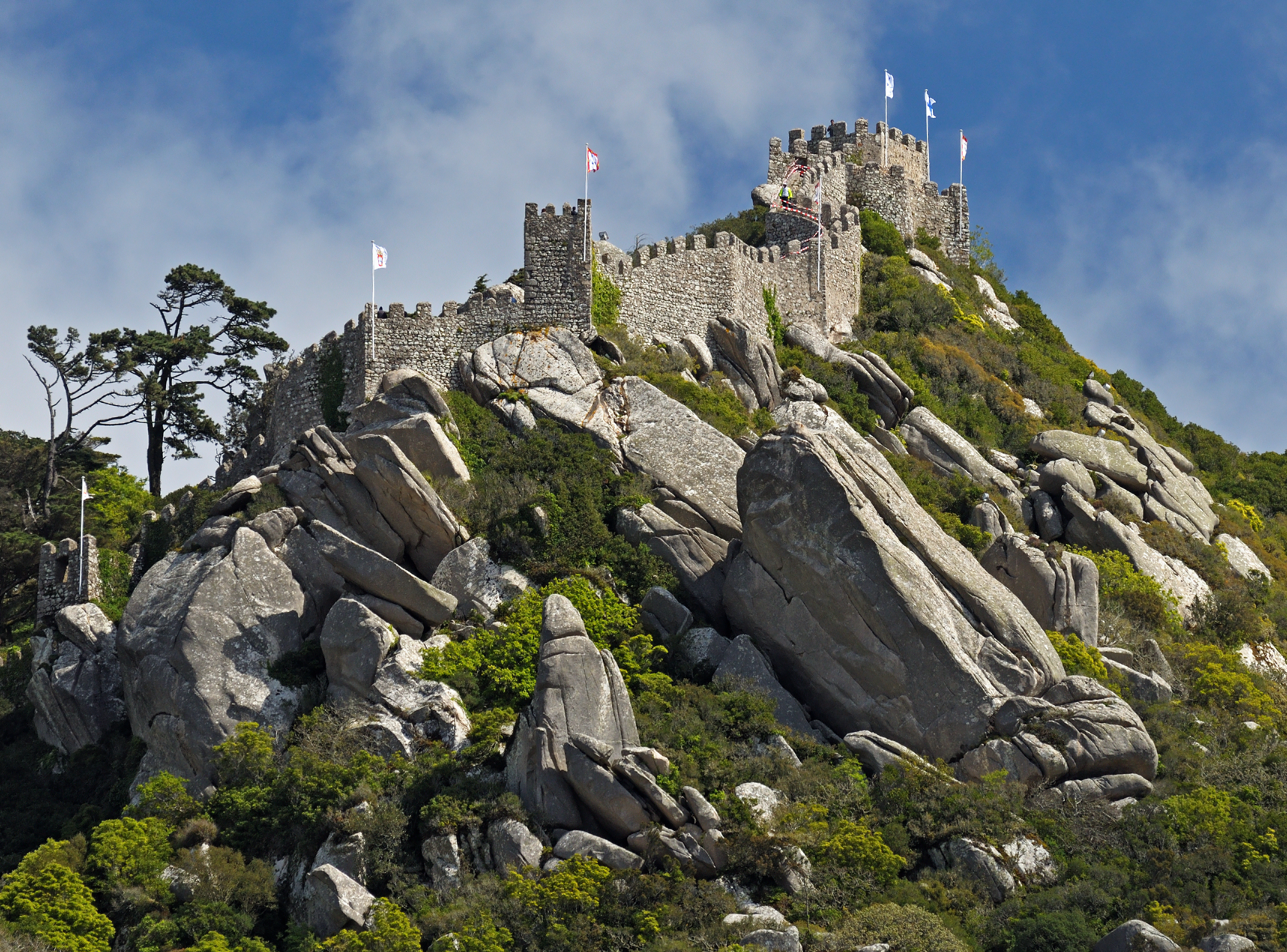

Site information
- Type: Castle
- Owner: Portuguese Republic
- Operator: Parques de Sintra Monte da Lua S.A.
- Open to the public: Public

Location
- Coordinates: 38°47′33″N 9°23′22″W

Site history
- Built: 8th century
- Materials: Granite, Limestone with "mixtum vittatum"

UNESCO World Heritage Site
- Part of: Cultural Landscape of Sintra
- Criteria: Cultural: (ii), (iv), (v)
- Reference: 723
- Inscription: 1995 (19th Session)

Portuguese National Monument
- Type: Non-movable
- Criteria: National Monument
- Designated: 16 June 1910
- Reference no.: IPA.00004641

The Castle of the Moors (Portuguese: Castelo dos Mouros) is a hilltop medieval castle located in the central Portuguese civil parish of Santa Maria e São Miguel, in the municipality of Sintra, about 25 km (16 mi) northwest of Lisbon. Built by the Moors in the 8th and 9th centuries, it was an important strategic point during the Reconquista, and was taken by Christian forces after the fall of Lisbon in 1147. It is classified as a National Monument, part of the Sintra Cultural Landscape, a UNESCO World Heritage Site.

== History ==
The castle was constructed during the 8th and 9th centuries, during the period of Muslim Iberia, as the central place in territory that was primarily agricultural, and necessary to protect its population.

In 1031, after the loss of Córdoba to the Almoravid dynasty, the king of Badajoz opted to transfer to Alfonso VI of León and Castile a few territories on the Iberian peninsula (among them Sintra) in order to gain an alliance with the Christian king. This transfer did not result in any security, and the castle was lost to the invading Almoravid.

After the conquest of Lisbon in (1147) by forces loyal to Afonso Henriques, the castle surrendered voluntarily to Christian forces. Afonso Henriques entrusted the castle's security to 30 inhabitants, granting them privileges in the foral ('charter') signed by the monarch in 1154. The charter suggested that settlers should occupy and inhabit the castle, as a mechanism for guaranteeing the region's security and development.

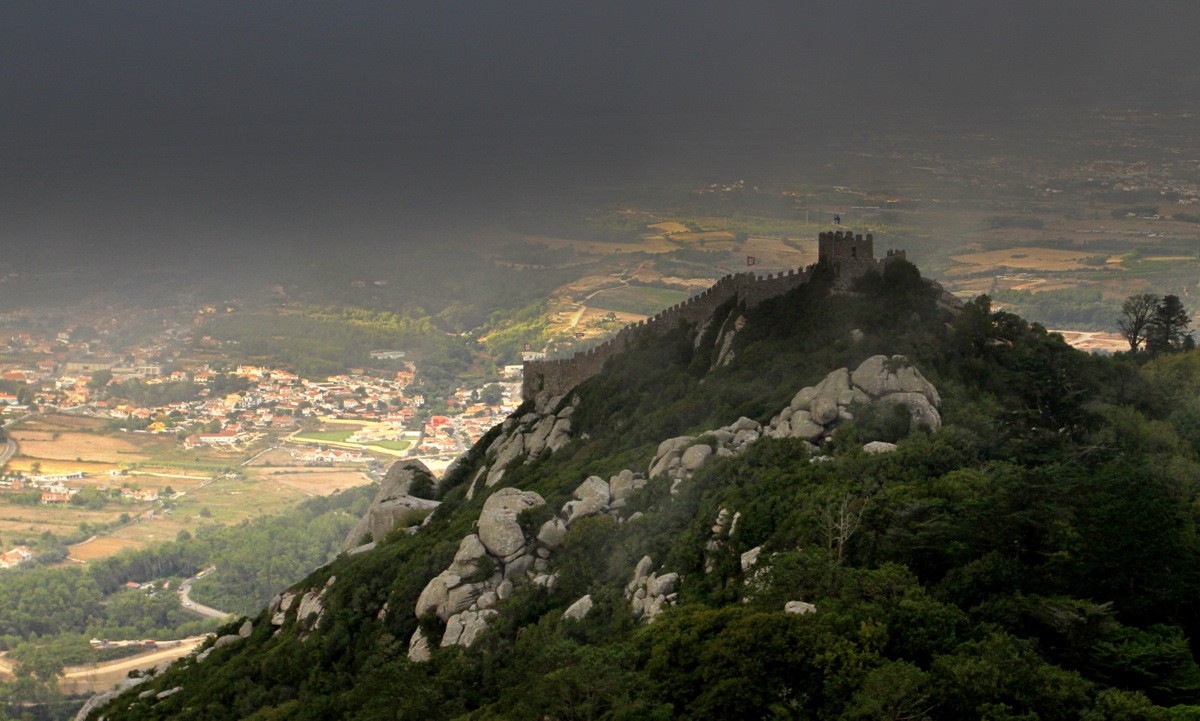
The Moorish Castle in the fog, overlooking the historic town of Sintra

During the second half of the 12th century, the chapel constructed within the walls of the castle became the parish seat. This was followed by remodelling and construction under the initiative of King Sancho I of Portugal.

In 1375 King Ferdinand I of Portugal, under the counsel of João Annes de Almada, ordered the rebuilding of the castle. While the structure was well fortified by 1383, its military importance was progressively diminishing as, more and more, the inhabitants abandoned the castle for the old village of Sintra.

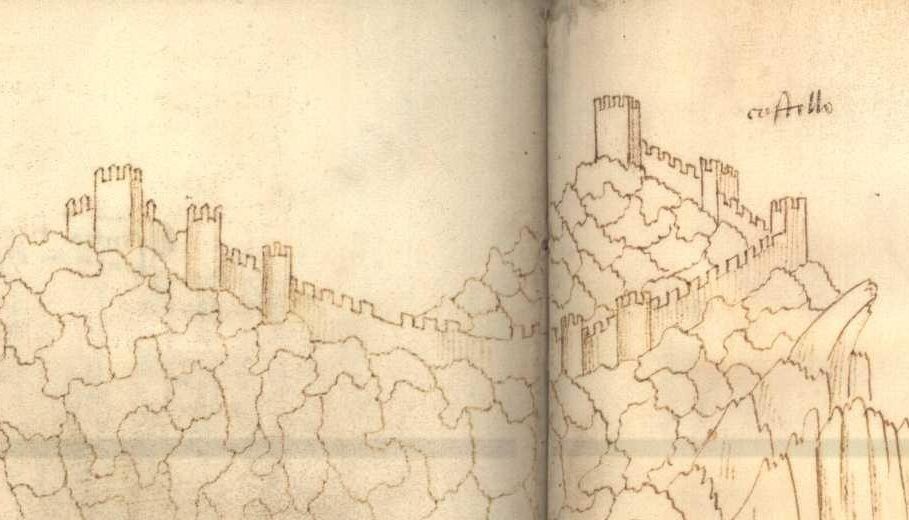
Castelo dos Mouros in 1510, from Book of Fortresses by Duarte de Armas

While the chapel was still being used as a centre of religious activities at the beginning of the 15th century, by 1493 this chapel was abandoned and later used by the small Jewish community of the parish. This was followed in the 16th century by the transfer of the ecclesiastical parish of São Pedro from the castle to the new parochial church in the village. The Jews occupying and using structures in the castle were expelled by Manuel I of Portugal, and the castle was abandoned.

The 1755 Lisbon earthquake caused considerable damage to the chapel and affected the stability of the castle. Visiting the chapel, Francisco de Almeida Jordão described the chapel (in 1768) as having a "principal door in the east, and in the south another smaller door, and a window. In addition to a painted image on the altar, there was another of rock which, already exists in the hermitage of Santa Eufémia, where they took it". An 1830 lithograph by Burnett immortalized the chapel's place in the Castle.

By 1838 the towers were already in ruins when in 1840 Ferdinand II of Portugal began the task of conserving and improving the condition of the castle, in which he committed 240 réis annually. He consolidated the walls, reforested the spaces, created nooks and manicured spaces and conserved the chapel. Along the south flank of the chapel he built a monument to collect the bones discovered during the public works, planting a tree in the central nave of the chapel. These reforms in the enclosure were overseen by Wilhelm Ludwig von Eschwege, but likely made the archaeological exploration of the territory difficult.

At the end of the 19th century the administrator of the Forestry Service, Carlos de Nogueira, authorized several projects in the castle and in the chapel.

In 1939 the DGEMN became involved in the reconstruction of the castle walls, in addition to the lateral door of the chapel.

With an eye towards a fledgling tourist market, in 1954 a few of the cliffs were cleared to establish a picnic area near the castle, and in 1965 a transformer was installed to provide illumination.

In 1979 archaeological excavations in the Chapel of São Pedro were begun by the cultural services of Portugal, which discovered the existence of medieval funerary tombs, dating to the turn of the 13th century.

A dispatch by the Ministry of Culture, on 26 June 1996, declared the area of the Castle as a zone of special interest (Portuguese: Zona Especial de Protecção do imóvel).

During the summer of 1986, scouts were involved in projects to consolidate the walls with cement and clean the grounds, supported by the CMS.

In 2001 there were various interventions associated with cleaning the property, clearing undergrowth and forest overgrowth, and the installation of an electrical box along one of the walls.

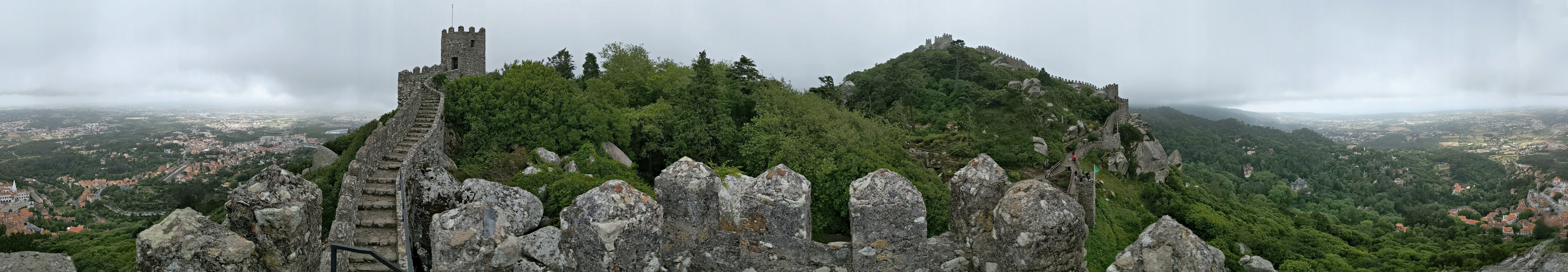
Panoramic view from atop a castle wall in 2019, showing the highest point of the castle in the distance right of center, and Sintra in the valley below

== Architecture ==
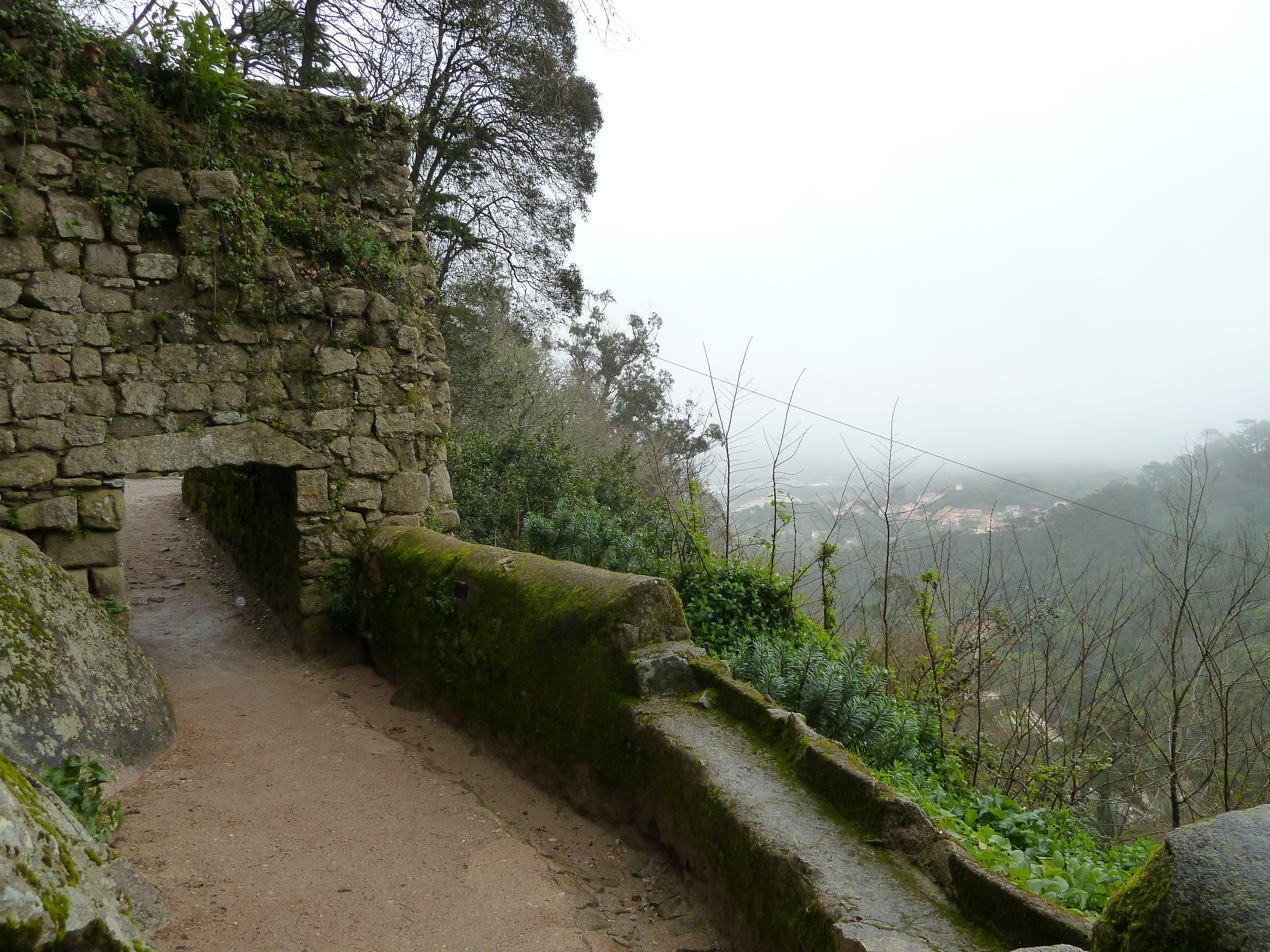
The outer wall, with its short, narrow entrance and battlements

The keep and adjoining walls

Situated on the top of the Sintra Mountains, it has a panoramic view of the municipality of Sintra, and on a clear day Mafra and Ericeira. It is accessible from Santa Maria e São Miguel by a protected gate and turnstile, or across a road from the Palace of Pena. The castle is located within the limits of the Sintra-Cascais Natural Park, on the north flank of the Sintra Mountains, where the slopes are at most 40% gradients. The locally known Serra da Sintra, consists of an eruptive massif with an abundance of granite, syenite, gabbro and diorite rock formations, with soils consisting of lithic, humic, cambic, normal, and granite (Mng) components.

The climate is characterized by lower temperatures and elevated precipitation, due to proximity to the ocean, its relief and dense vegetation. The local vegetation is dense and diverse, with a large percentage of exotics introduced during the 16th century by D. João de Castro, and in the 19th century by Ferdinand II and Francis Cook. Further, the fauna is characterized by a similar diversity, and was integrated into the royal estates and hunting grounds, including the Tapada dos Bichos, Tapada do Inhaca, Tapada do Borges, Pinhal do Prior and Tapada do Forjaz, Pinhal do Sereno, Pinhal do Tomado and Pinhal do Vale dos Anjos.

Within the proximity of the castle are many other sites, including the Garden of Pena (Portuguese: Parque da Pena), the Estate of Penha Verde (Portuguese: Quinta da Penha Verde), the Estate of Regaleira (Portuguese: Quinta da Regaleira), the Estate of Relógio (Portuguese: Quinta do Relógio) and the Park of Monserrate (Portuguese: Parque de Monserrate), among others. The Moorish Castle and other properties in the region act as the principal focus of tourism, the principal activity in the region.

=== Castle ===
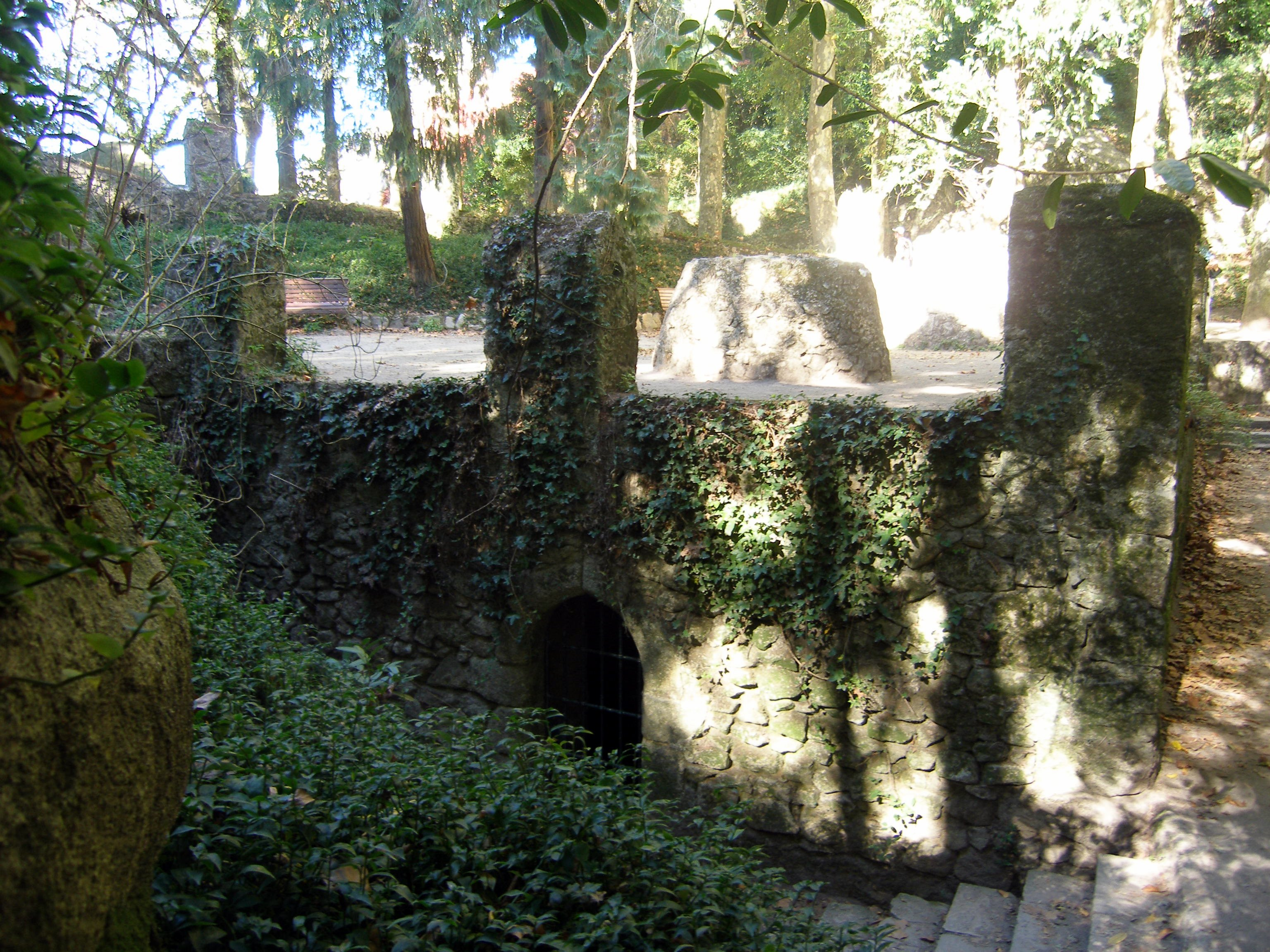
The large cistern that provided water for the castle

The castle is one of the many historical buildings that make up the Sintra Cultural Landscape, a UNESCO World Heritage Site, popular with tourists to Portugal

The castle is an irregularly planned military outpost that follows a 450-metre perimeter on top of a mountainous cliff, oriented southwest to northwest. It consists of a double line of military walls that meanders over the granite terrain of the promontory. Its place on the hilltop, surrounded by and including the natural and exotic vegetation, accentuates the Romantic character of the place. The Moorish Castle, due to its position and design, is considered along with Santarém, one of the principal points of the military plan of Belata (the Muslim province which corresponds to the Ribatejo and Estremadura). The property was remodelled and expanded over time, resulting in a Romantic-era ruin that included damage caused by time and the public works of Ferdinand II. The towers, which initially included two floors, has a modified appearance, without many of the internal divisions or roofing typical of the period. However, the location of the turrets seem to coincide with the design represented in the engravings of Duarte de Armas.

The outer walls open near Abelheira (west of Tapada dos Bichos), form a main access door, where several paths wind around the hilltop of the castle. A second ring of walls reinforces the castle with both circular and square turrets, thick wall battlements and railings crowned with pyramid-shaped merlons. At the second wall is the main entrance to the castle, protected by two turrets and battlements. Near these secondary walls and entrance are the main ruins of the old buildings, corresponding to the cellars, animal pens and cistern. The subterranean cistern, accessible from a three-metre accessway, is 18 metres long by 6 metres wide, and 6 metres in height, where water was collected from openings on its "roof". The interior walls are punctuated by five rectangular towers and one circular tower, surmounted by pyramidal merlons, while surrounding these structures are remnants of older constructions. A small door, normally covered in underbrush, opens to the northern façade of the castle, corresponding to the Traitors Gate, accessing the main "military square" within the structure. In the southwest corner is the highest tower, known as the royal tower.

Along the perimeter of the castle exist various bins or silos, originating from the Arab occupation, many of which are plant covered.

=== Chapel ===
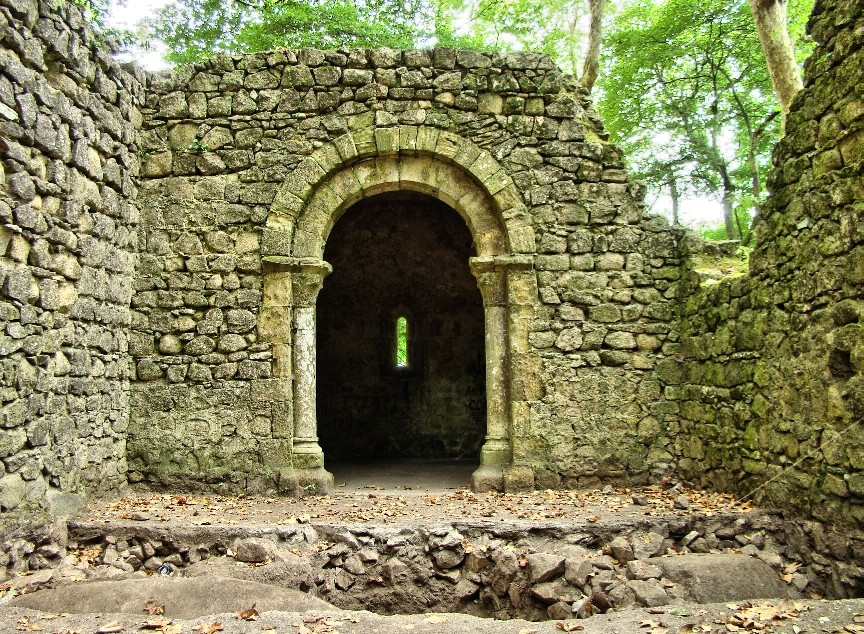
The Chapel of São Pedro de Penaferrim, with the arched doorway and decorated capitals

A chapel with rectangular nave and narrow, lower presbytery lies outside the secondary wall, not too far from the entrance. These ruins were constructed of limestone and masonry, and the interior is accessible from the western or southern façades. The southern wall is highlighted by an arched doorway, supported by colonnades and decorative capitals, with vegetation or fantastical animal motifs (gryphons and basilisks). The northern façade, with a 1.5 metre opening, corresponds to a primitive door, elevated owing to the accentuated terrain. A triumphal arch based on double columns, similar portal in the south, includes carved capitals with phytomorphic bezels and vestiges of a door. The main chapel has a cradle vault with remains of frescoes, representing a halo in the sky with a figure corresponding to the patron saint, surrounded by floral and geometric motifs, all surrounded by a frieze with geometric designs. Alongside the area designated for the oratory, is a small rectangular niche for religious equipment. The fact that the chapel was located within the walls of the castle led to the tradition that the structure served as mosque prior to the Reconquista. Although it is likely that there may have existed a place of worship for the Muslim population, there is no specific association with this building.

== Climate ==
The climate in the castle resembles the climate experienced on the rest of the Sintra Mountains. Winters are cool and rainy, averaging between 12 °C (54 °F) in the daytime, and 6–7 °C (43–45 °F) at nighttime. Though higher in altitude, temperatures below freezing are uncommon, as nighttime temperatures are relatively mild. Summers are cool to warm and dry, with temperatures between 21–24 °C (70–75 °F) in the daytime, and 15 °C (59 °F) at night. Compared to the city of Lisbon, the castle is cooler year-round, with less sunshine and more precipitation, humidity and fog. Fog is very common, especially in the month of June (see June Gloom). November and December are the wettest months.

Climate data for Castle of the Moors, 1931-1960, altitude: 471 m (1,545 ft)
Month	Jan	Feb	Mar	Apr	May	Jun	Jul	Aug	Sep	Oct	Nov	Dec	Year
Record high °C (°F)	23.7 (74.7)	26.1 (79.0)	30.7 (87.3)	36.0 (96.8)	39.8 (103.6)	40.1 (104.2)	45.0 (113.0)	41.1 (106.0)	37.1 (98.8)	35.5 (95.9)	27.9 (82.2)	24.9 (76.8)	45.0 (113.0)
Mean daily maximum °C (°F)	11.8 (53.2)	12.8 (55.0)	14.8 (58.6)	17.2 (63.0)	19.0 (66.2)	21.8 (71.2)	23.6 (74.5)	24.2 (75.6)	22.7 (72.9)	19.8 (67.6)	15.2 (59.4)	12.2 (54.0)	17.9 (64.3)
Daily mean °C (°F)	9.1 (48.4)	9.8 (49.6)	11.6 (52.9)	13.4 (56.1)	14.9 (58.8)	17.4 (63.3)	19.0 (66.2)	19.6 (67.3)	18.6 (65.5)	16.2 (61.2)	12.3 (54.1)	9.6 (49.3)	14.3 (57.7)
Mean daily minimum °C (°F)	6.4 (43.5)	6.7 (44.1)	8.4 (47.1)	9.6 (49.3)	10.8 (51.4)	13.0 (55.4)	14.3 (57.7)	15.0 (59.0)	14.4 (57.9)	12.7 (54.9)	9.4 (48.9)	7.1 (44.8)	10.7 (51.2)
Record low °C (°F)	−3.0 (26.6)	−5.0 (23.0)	−0.8 (30.6)	1.5 (34.7)	3.4 (38.1)	6.1 (43.0)	5.0 (41.0)	8.5 (47.3)	5.0 (41.0)	5.4 (41.7)	1.4 (34.5)	−2.2 (28.0)	−5.0 (23.0)
Average rainfall mm (inches)	126.7 (4.99)	88.8 (3.50)	129.8 (5.11)	65.6 (2.58)	43.2 (1.70)	15.7 (0.62)	5.0 (0.20)	6.7 (0.26)	37.8 (1.49)	81.7 (3.22)	110.8 (4.36)	111.9 (4.41)	823.7 (32.44)
Average rainy days (≥ 0.1 mm)	15	10	14	10	8	5	3	4	6	10	13	15	113
Average relative humidity (%)	87	84	85	78	80	81	77	78	80	80	85	87	82
Mean monthly sunshine hours	124.5	144.6	147.7	211.5	250.6	236.6	297.3	288.4	220.8	189.2	140.9	136.5	2,388.6
Percentage possible sunshine	41	48	40	53	56	53	66	68	59	54	47	46	53
Source: Instituto Português do Mar e da Atmosfera

== See also ==
- Castles in Portugal
- Castle of Silves
- São Jorge Castle

== Gallery ==
The castle viewed from Pena Palace

Main gate, built among granite boulders

Walls, towers and enclosed grounds

The keep and adjoining enclosure
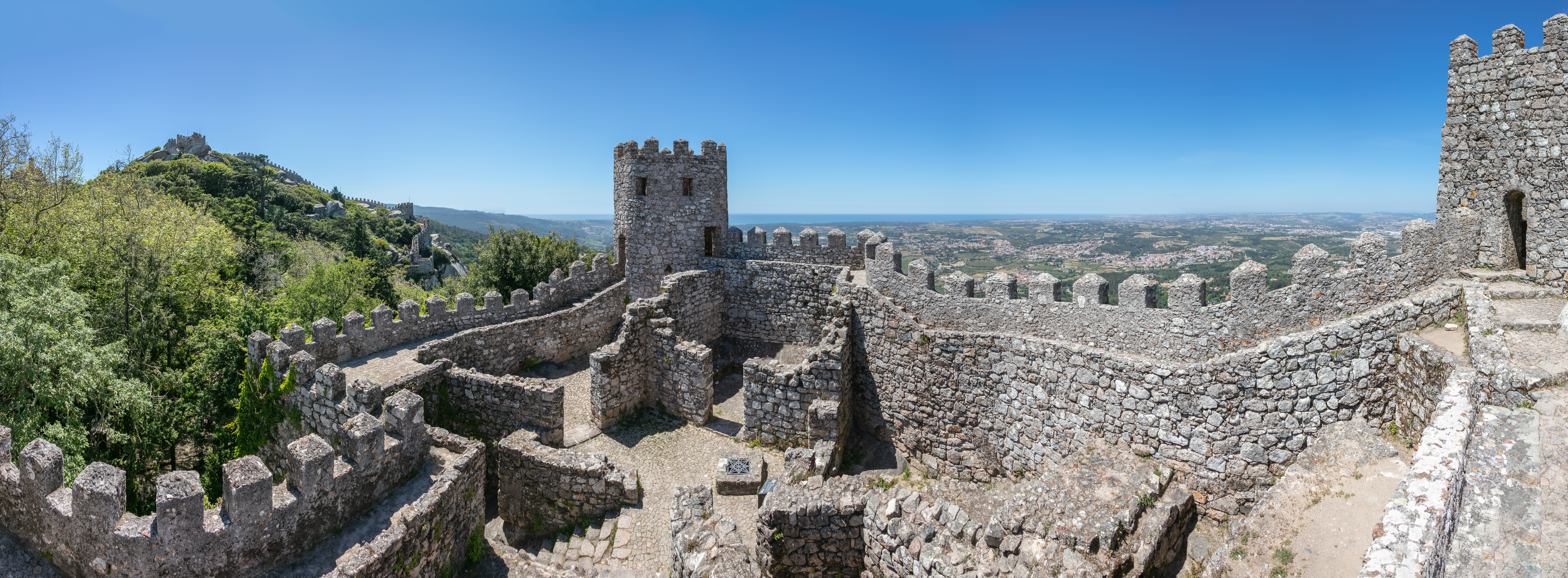
Panoramic view of the keep
