= Idanha, Portugal =

Idanha, Portugal may refer to:

- Idanha-a-Nova Municipality, a municipality in east-central Portugal
  - Idanha-a-Nova, a parish within the municipality
  - Idanha-a-Velha, a parish within the municipality
    - Castelo de Idanha-a-Velha
