= Castles in Portugal =

Overview on the castles of Portugal

Castles in Portugal were crucial components of the military throughout its history. The Portuguese learned the art of building fortifications from the Romans and the Moors. The Romans, who ruled and colonized the territory of current-day Portugal for more than four centuries, built forts with high walls and strong towers to defend their populations. The Moors, who invaded the Iberian Peninsula in the year 711 A.D., brought new stonework and heavily fortified gates to the peninsula.

== History ==
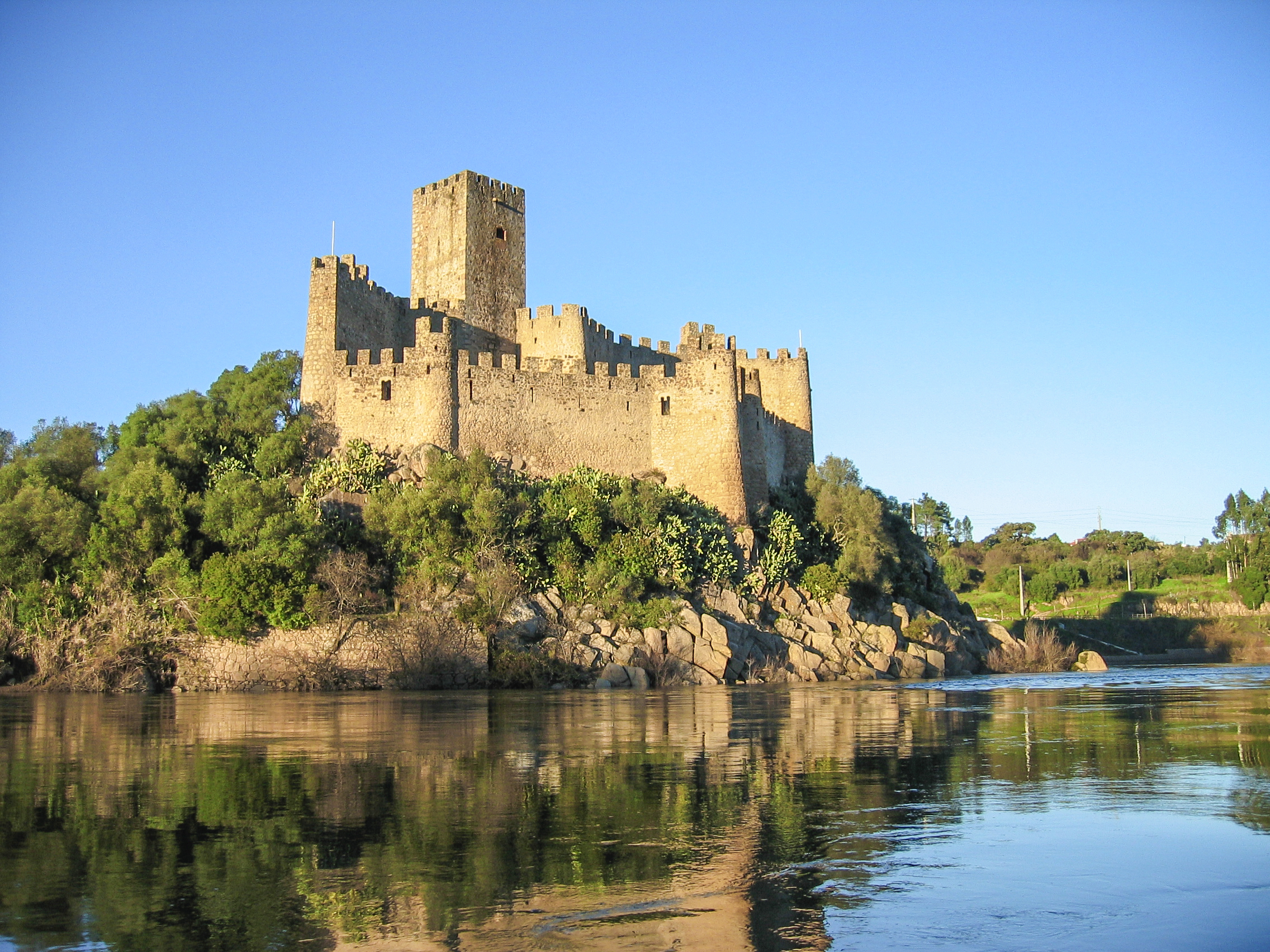
Almourol Castle, built c. 1171 on an island of the Tagus river by the Templar Knights. The highest tower is the square-shaped keep of the castle.

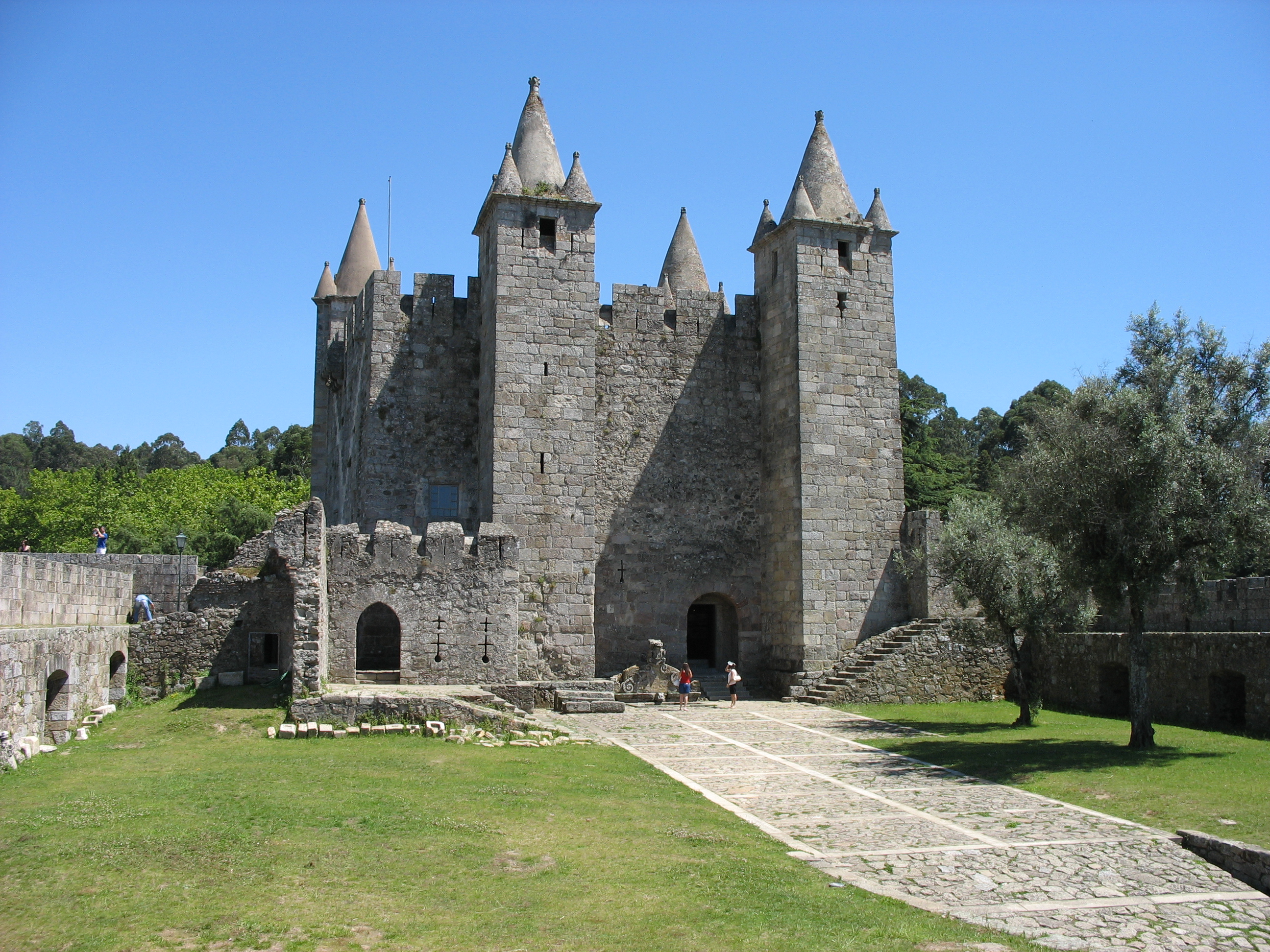
The keep of the Castle of Santa Maria da Feira

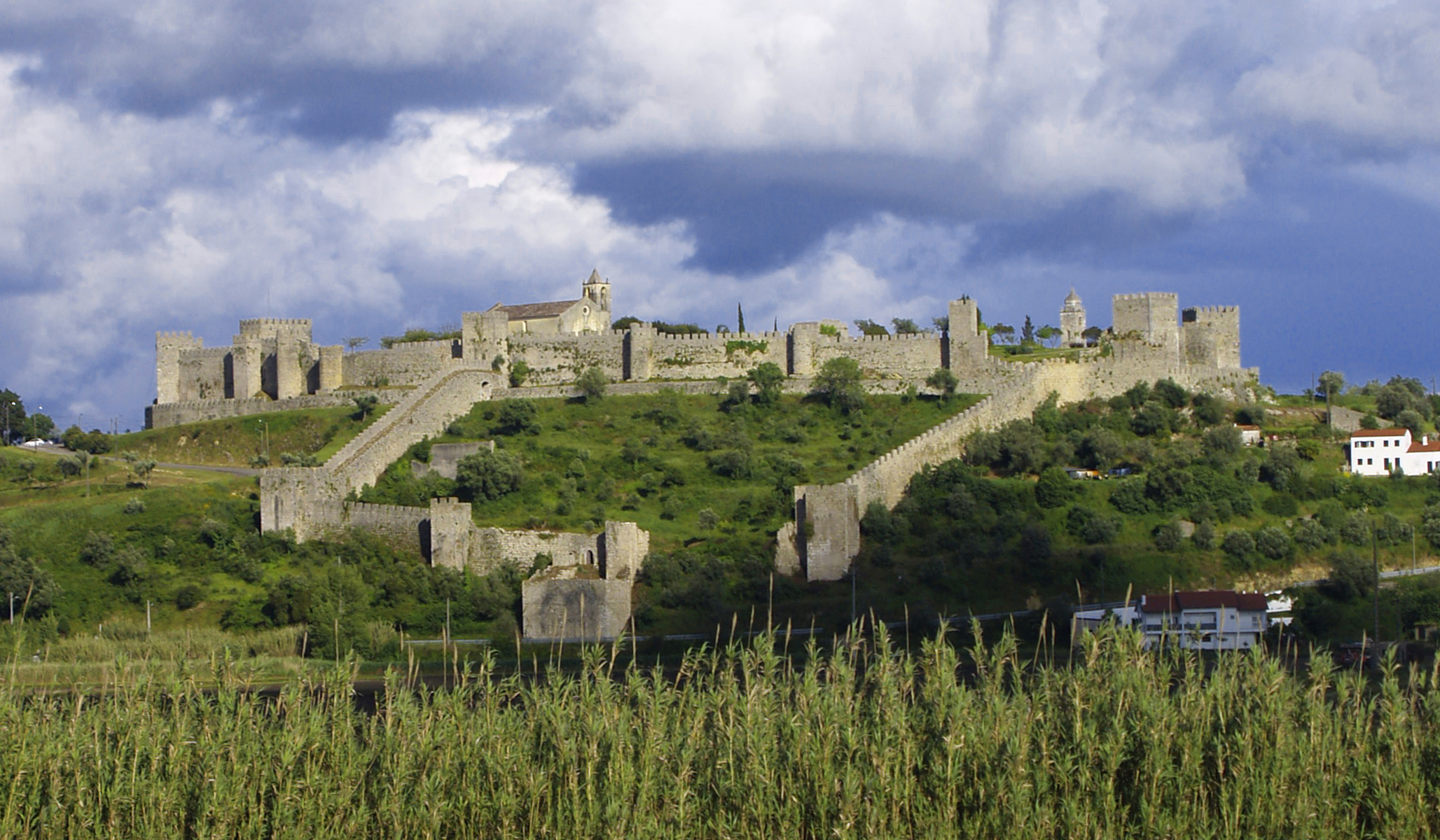
Montemor-o-Velho Castle

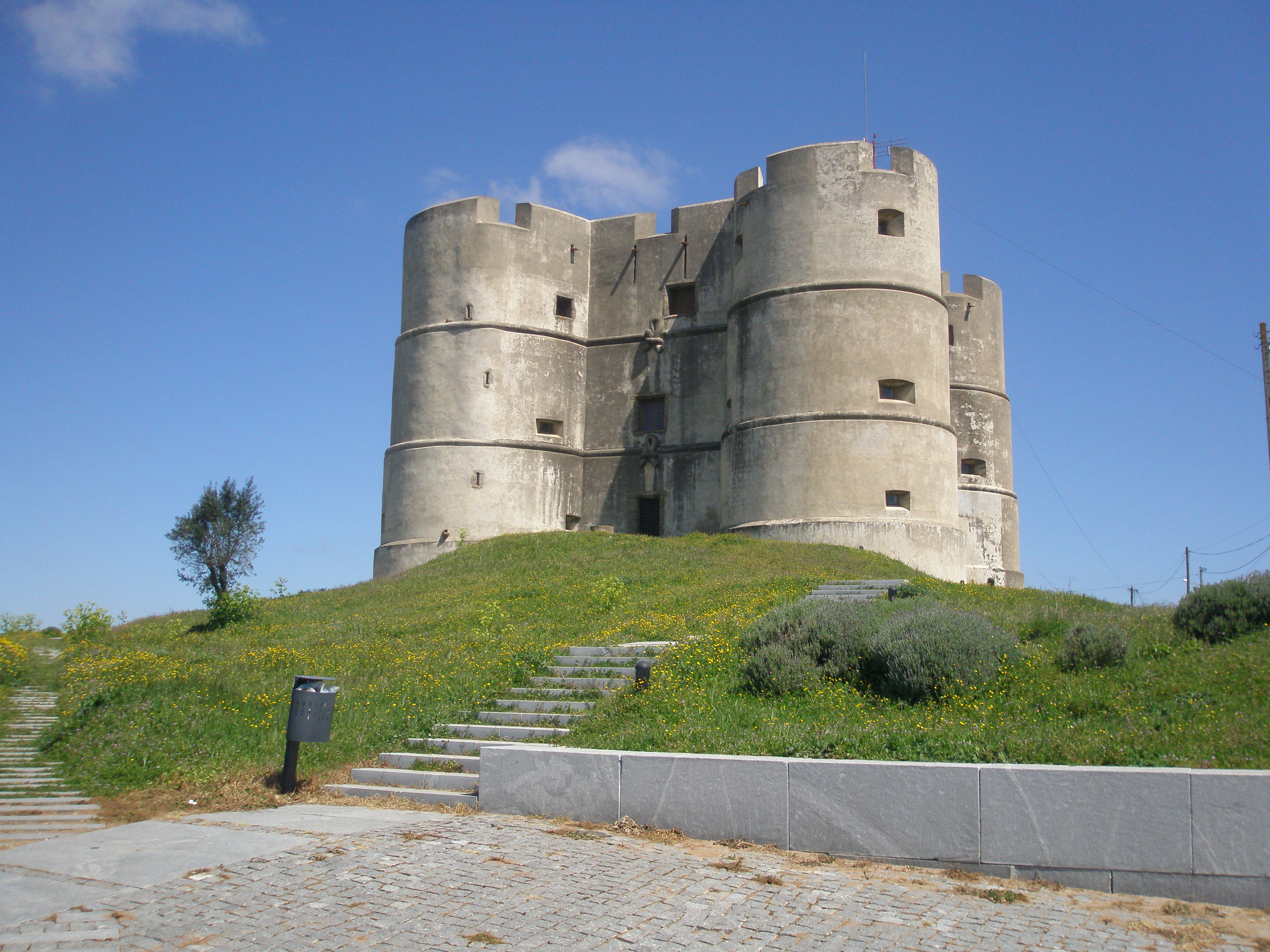
Evoramonte Castle

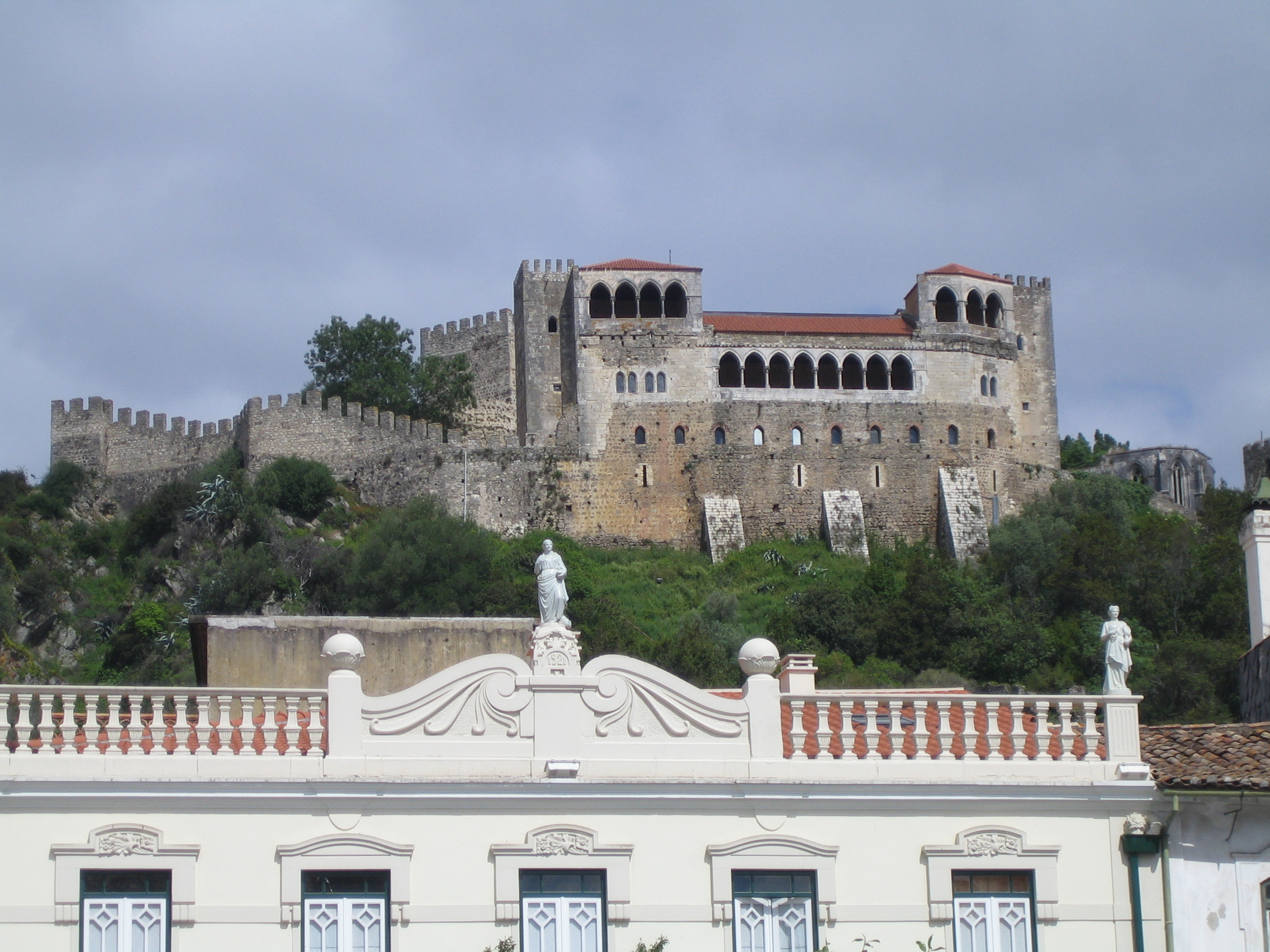
Castle of Leiria

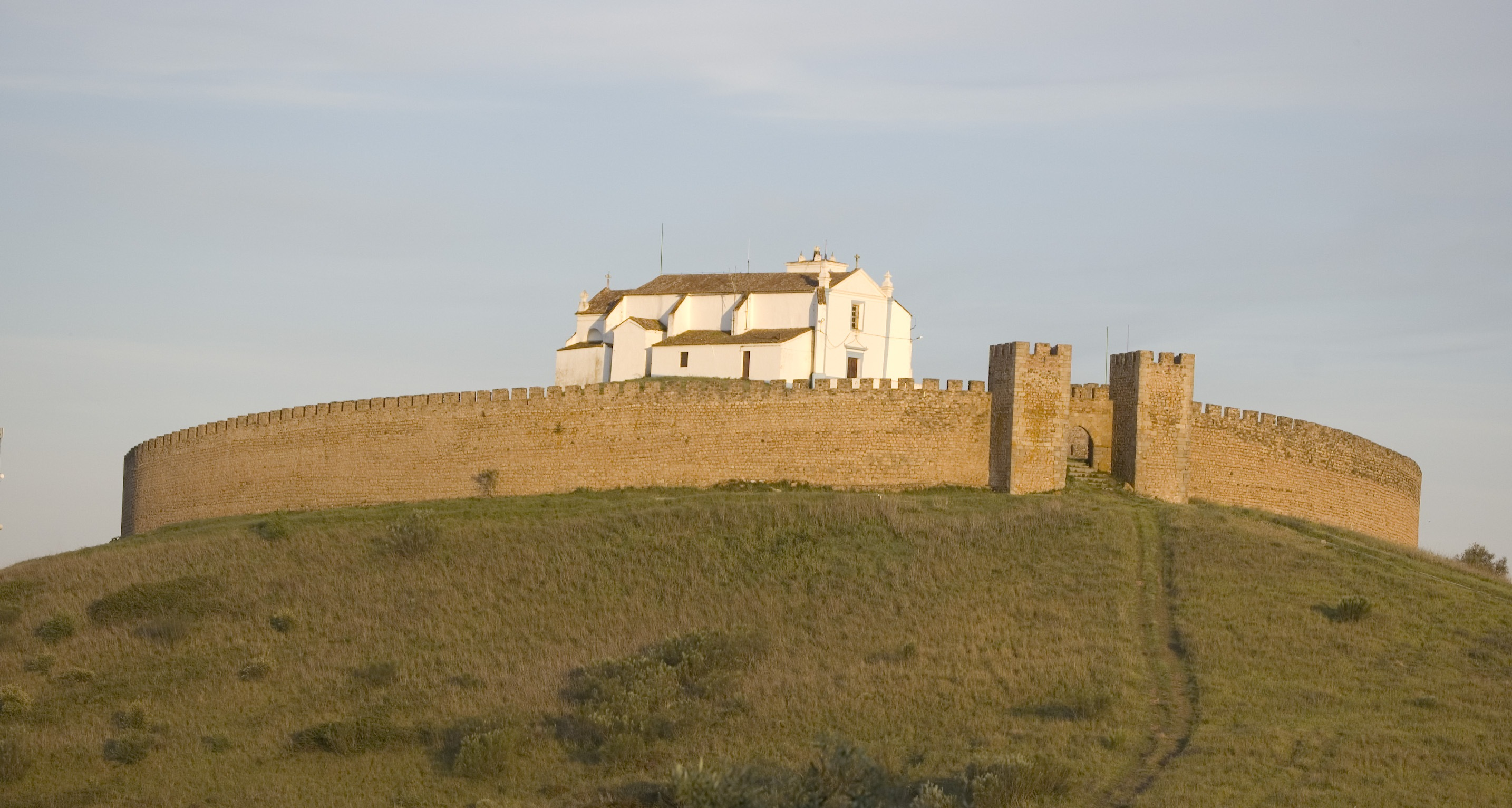
Castle of Arraiolos

Portugal has well-defined geographic boundaries, with the Atlantic Ocean to the south and west, and rivers and mountains to the east and north. It occupies the westernmost portion of the Iberian Peninsula and is about the size of the American state of Indiana. The country is a place of topographical contrasts, making defense difficult. The areas around Porto in the north are covered in green hills, with fertile river valleys and a rocky coast. The green mountains are less fertile as they spread to the east and become mountainous towards the south to the Beiras. Along the coastal Beiras, the topography becomes hillier with pine forests and a sandy coast. The capitol Lisbon in the central region and its surrounding area is known for its white rocks, olive fields, and open spaces. The Tagus basin divides the nation in half, with the yellow hills and cattle fields of the central region on the north bank and the beginnings of the Alentejo to the south. The Alentejo is a vast golden plain that extends south to the red cliffs and green hills of the Algarve. These conditions made the defense of Portugal difficult, the region was marked by eras of fortification building. Unlike many of their European counterparts, Portuguese castles were heavily influenced by the master-builders of Rome and Northern Africa. Even the early Celtic tribes of Portugal, the early Lusitanians, already fortified their villages within simple stone walls by this time. The Romans, who occupied Portugal for the next 400 years after this period, then built forts with high walls and strong towers to defend their towns. The Romans were the first to bring in organized military outposts in order to guard their domains. These outposts were usually built on existing fortified castros or defensible Neolithic/Paleolithic strongholds in the hills. Eventually, the Romans gradually built their centers based on their trade and/or commercial needs and abandoned many sites for places along rivers or lowland agricultural settlements. The outposts that remained continued to serve as sentries or outposts, while some points evolved into larger towns or cities that survived long after the Romans had retreated.

By the Middle Ages, Portugal was a crossroads of cultures, with hostile Moors to the south and rival Iberian kingdoms to the east. There were primarily two main periods of fortified castle construction: those built and defended by the Moors from Northern Africa, between the 8th and 13th centuries, and those built or maintained by Christian forces including the Kingdom of Portugal, after this period.

=== Moors ===
The Moors, Islamic peoples who had arrived in the Iberian Peninsula from Northern Africa around 711 A.D., conquering the Christian lands ruled by the Germanic Kingdoms of the peninsula, built strong castles and fortifications in many cities. They brought innovative stonework and heavily fortified gates to Portugal. Meanwhile, Northern European and English forts/castles were built with wood material during this period. Although many Portuguese medieval castles originated in the Islamic period, most of them were extensively remodeled after the Christian reconquest. One of the best-preserved is the Castle of Silves, in the ancient capital of the Al-Garb (today's Algarve). Built between the 8th and 13th centuries, the castle retains its walls and square-shaped towers from the Moorish period (including its 11th-century cisterns or water reservoirs). The old Moorish center of the city, the Almedina, was defended by a wall and several fortified towers and gates, parts of which are still preserved.

Another example of Islamic castles in the Algarve is the Castle of Paderne, whose ruined walls serves as evidence of the taipa building technique used in some period construction. The Castle of the Moors in Sintra (near Lisbon), has also preserved remains of its walls and a cistern from the Moorish occupation. Similarly, many of modern Portuguese towns and cities still retain examples of Moorish city walls that have been preserved or reused locally, such as in the Cerca Velha of Lisbon or the fortifications of Évora. Many of these walls were marked by the characteristic horseshoe-shaped gates leading into their courtyards, as shown from the castles in Faro and Elvas.

=== Kingdom ===
During the Portuguese Reconquista (12th and 13th centuries) many of the castles were reused or rebuilt to protect their fledgling kingdom from invasions from both Moors and rival Christians, like the Castilians. King Afonso Henriques sponsored the building of many fortifications (often remodeling Moorish castles) such as the Castle of São Jorge (in Lisbon) and granted land to Military Orders (especially the Templar Knights and the Knights Hospitallers) in order maintain order and defend their border outposts. The Templar Knights built several fortresses along the line of the Tagus river, like the castles of Pombal, Tomar, Belver and Almourol. They are credited as having introduced the keep to Portuguese military architecture. In addition to supporting national integrity, the castle was used to defend many of the settlements and towns in the hinterland and promote the possession of crown.

Around the 12th century, Portugal emerged as a nation led by the nobleman Afonso Henriques, launched a bold crusade to carve the southwestern half of the Iberian Peninsula away from the Moors. Many of Portugal's earliest castles from this post-1139 A.D. period were reconstructions of Moorish and Roman forts. Their ogival style has certain common themes: high simple granite walls, a dual towered gatehouse, a cistern, and pointed castellated walls.

During the Gothic period, the castles became more and more flamboyant and deadly, with archers’ loops in the castellated walls, oil spouts at the base of parapets, and increasingly higher keeps and towers. By 1249 the Moors had been expelled from southern Portugal and the nation became the first in Europe to take on its modern borders. The focus of Portuguese castles during this period shifted from lines along east to west flowing rivers, to the towns along the long Portuguese border with rival Castile. The pinnacles of this period were the 13th-century castles built under King Denis, who rebuilt almost every major castle in the land. Until Denis, Portugal’s castles were usually just a three-story keep with one or two rings of walls. New tower keeps were built like the one at Castle of Beja or the five-sided keep at Sabugal. Many castles were encircled by multiple layers of walls, many with staggered gates and hidden escape doors. The wooden buildings used by the garrisons were built with more room for provisions and space for soldiers.

When the Knights Templar were dissolved in the 1300s, King Denis created the Order of Christ to replace them, and turned the Convent of Christ in Tomar Castle, now a world heritage site, into the Order of Christ's headquarters. The Church of Santa Maria de Olival is the burial site for the Knights of Templar, including Gualdim Pais, who founded Tomar.

The 13th and 14th centuries was a period of flamboyant castle building, with more decorative touches and features, like pepper pots on towers, ornate brickwork, and massive great halls built of stone. Many of these castles became fortified palaces to protect the monarch and courts, but just as castle building reached its apex the era came to quick end in 1453: in Byzantium, the Turks brought down the once impregnable walls of the castle with cannon fire. The age of castles was over, but the age of great forts had just begun. Gone were high walls, proud keeps and strong towers, transitioning into low stonewalls built around mounds of earth to repulse cannonballs. The straight lines of walls were replaced by star-like angles to allow for cannon and gunfire to be crossed with deadly results against the enemy. These forts became much more sophisticated in the 16th and 17th centuries. Portuguese engineers-built hundreds of forts to defend the empire. Many are still found across South America, Africa, and Asia. The finest examples in Portugal are found in Almeida, Valença do Minho, Marvão, and Elvas. These gun forts were in use until the 1830s Civil War, the last war to be fought on Portuguese soil and some had military uses into the 20th century.

== See also ==
- List of castles in Portugal
- Portuguese architecture
- Military history of Portugal
- History of Portugal
- Castle
- Reconquista
- Knights Templar in Portugal
