= Ceras =

Ceras may refer to:

- the singular of Cerata, anatomical structures found in nudibranch sea slugs, marine opisthobranch gastropod mollusks
- Ceras (gastropod), a mollusc genus in the family Achatinidae
- Centre de Recherche et d’action sociales, a French association created in 1903 by Society of Jesus
- "-ceras", a suffix used to describe many horned animals
- Cera dynasty, an Indian dynasty that ruled over parts of southern India
- Ceras Yanagida Lilienfeld, a character from Link! Like! Love Live!
