= Castelo de Idanha-a-Velha =

Castle in Portugal

Coordinates: 39°59′44″N 7°08′38″W

Castelo de Idanha-a-Velha is a castle in Idanha-a-Velha, Idanha-a-Nova municipality, Portugal. It is classified as a National Monument.

== See also ==
- Idanha-a-Velha
- Portugal in the Reconquista
- Knights Templar in Portugal
