= Castelo de Longroiva =

Castle in Portugal

Coordinates: 40°57′50″N 7°12′31″W

Castelo de Longroiva is a castle in Portugal. It is classified as a National Monument.
