= Hoarding (castle) =

Temporary wooden defensive structures

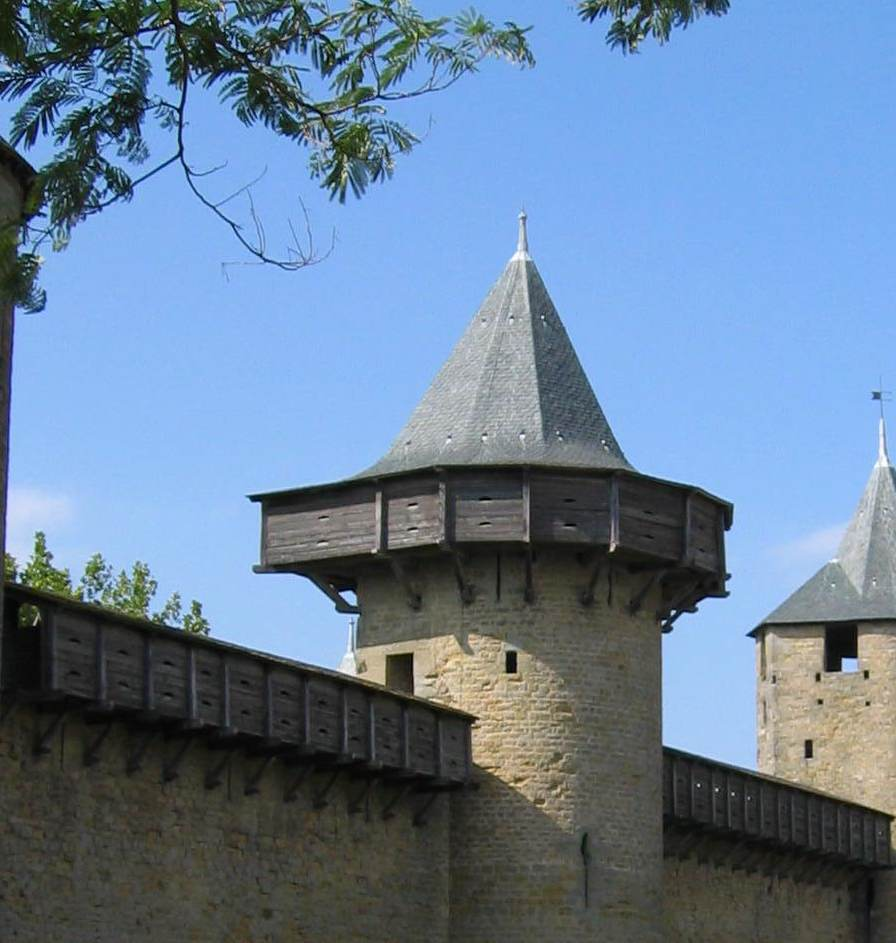
Reconstructed wooden hoarding around the Cité de Carcassonne, France

A hoard or hoarding was a temporary wooden shed-like construction on the exterior of a castle during a siege that enabled the defenders to improve their field of fire along the length of a wall and, most particularly, directly downwards towards the bottom of the wall. The latter function was the purpose of the invention of machicolations, which were an improvement on hoardings, not least because masonry is fireproof. Machicolations are also permanent and always ready for a siege.

It is suspected that hoardings were stored as prefabricated elements in peacetime. Construction of hoardings was often facilitated by putlog holes, sockets that were left in the masonry of castle walls for wooden joists called "putlogs". However, some hoardings were supported on permanent stone corbels.

Some medieval hoardings have survived, including examples on the north tower of Stokesay Castle, England, and the keep of Laval, France. The Château Comtal of Carcassonne and the keep of Rouen Castle, both in France, have reconstructed wooden hoardings, and also Castell Coch in South Wales, which was wholly rebuilt in 1875 and which has a hoarding over the drawbridge designed by the Victorian architect William Burges. Another reconstructed hoarding can be seen in Caerphilly Castle, also in South Wales, which extends along the northern curtain wall of the inner bailey.

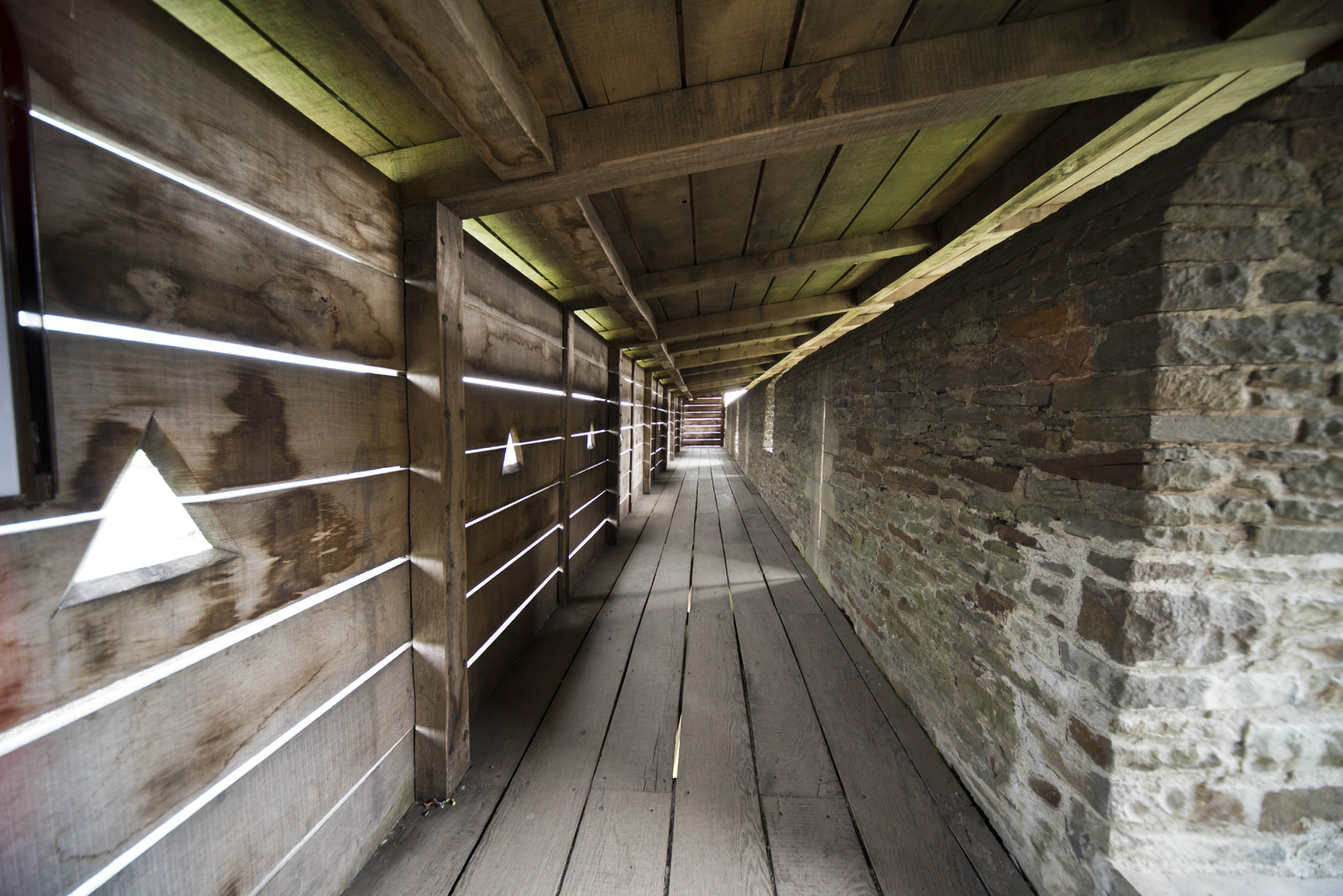
The interior of a reconstructed hoarding around Caerphilly Castle, Wales.

== See also ==
- Arrow slit
- Bartizan
- Castle
- Drawbridge
- Murder hole
