= Book of Fortresses =

1509 collection of castle drawings by Duarte das Armas

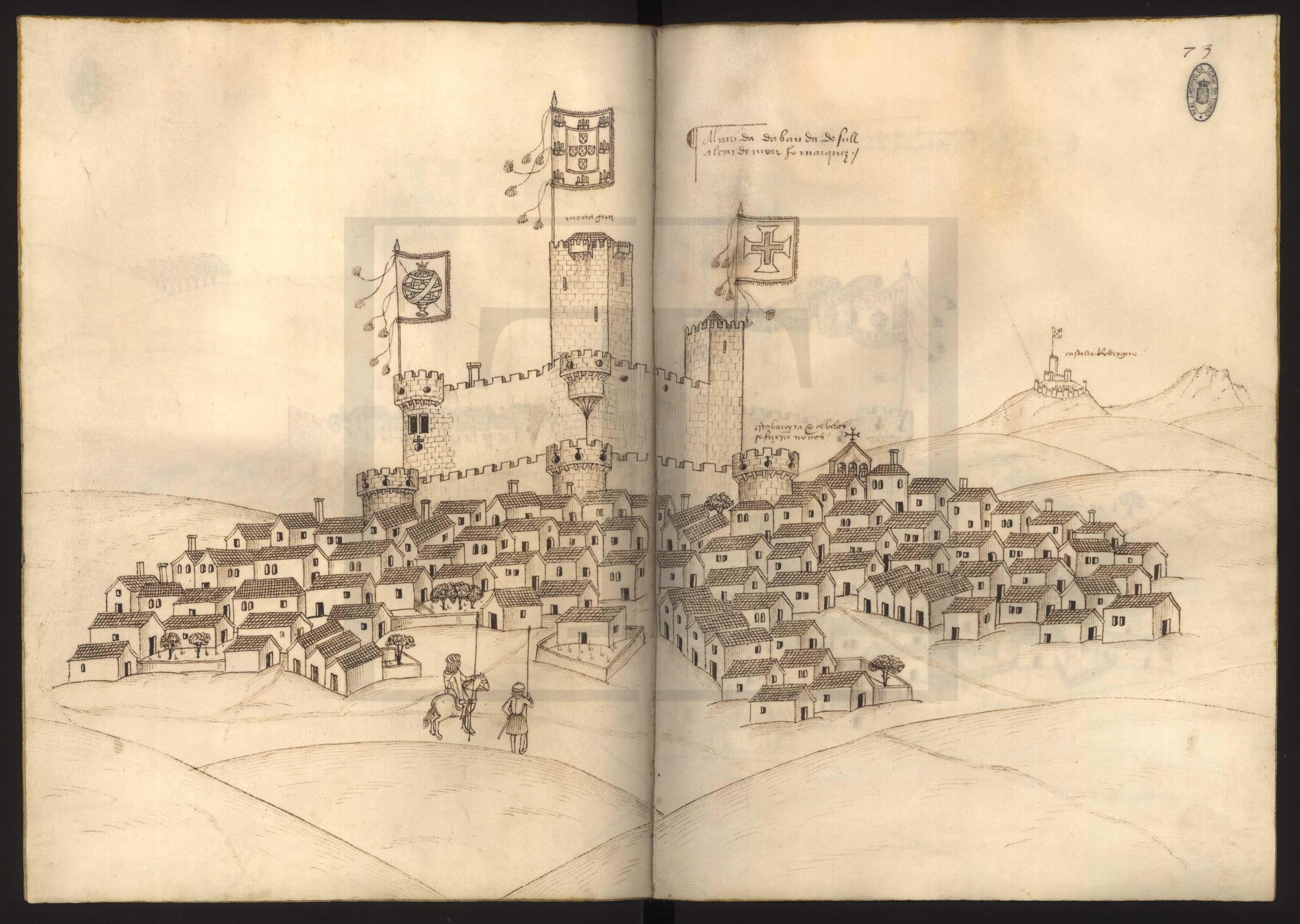
Southern view of the town and castle of Almeida, as seen in the Book of Fortresses.

The Book of Fortresses (Portuguese: Livro das Fortalezas) is a sixteenth-century manuscript written in 1509–1510 by the Royal Clerk Duarte de Armas at the behest King Manuel I of Portugal. The work contains drawings of all the 56 Portuguese border castles, all of which have been personally visited by the author. The book is considered to be a valuable source for the study of cartography and military architecture of the kingdom of Portugal.

== History ==
King Manuel I (1495–1521) conducted extensive work to centralize and modernize the government of Portugal. Among the most important reforms, there are the Manueline Ordinances and called Reading Nova, the reform of the charters which resulted in 596 new charters throughout the kingdom. In another field, the monarch decreed the execution of the Armoury-Mor of the Book of Sintra room and the Book of Nobility and Perfeiçam Weapons, to regulate the use of heraldic arms in the kingdom and make manifest the will of the sovereign as a source of honor.

The Book of Fortresses, a part of the centralization and reform process, was needed to assess the military defenses of the kingdom. The monarch instructed Duarte de Armas, the Royal House squire, to inspect the fortifications along the border with the kingdom of Castile Duarte de Armas, accompanied by a servant on foot, toured the horse most castellated border settlements, preparing paper sketches (debuxos) with its panoramic (at least two per town from different directions) views. Contemporary research shows early spring 1509 as the start date of the work trip in Castro Marim, until their completion, seven months later, in September in Caminha. We were visited in this route 56 towns / castles. On his return to Lisbon, we were also visited Barcelos and Sintra. Having collected the material, the author organized a codex of two volumes, completed in March 1510.

== Content ==
The two volumes Arms Duarte's work would come to be known as the Book of Fortresses, since the author did not name his work. The codex containing the two volumes is now deposited in the National Archives of Torre do Tombo in Lisbon. The two volumes, with 139 folios in total, are now called:

- Codex B, consisting of flax paper sheets, with 110 site plans, with dimensions of 296 x 404mm relating to settlements
- Codex A, consisting of large sheets of parchment with multiple panoramic views with the dimensions of 350 x 490mm for each town and castle. This codex also two non-border towns - Barcelos and Sintra - with one three views, respectively.

Scholars point out, in the last codex in particular, various illustrative aspects of daily life were added in order to humanize the images. Some notable drawings include humans and donkeys in Castelo Branco; pastors in Monsanto and Almeida; women who were fetching water in Ouguela and Montalban; or the hanged in Castle of Serpa and Elvas, an act which, paradoxically, give life to the images. In addition to these figures, Duarte de Armas himself and his servant can be seen numerous times throughout the work. The two figures give the highly dynamic designs - see, for example, cases of Olivença and Castle of Freixo de Espada à Cinta. The author also drew sometimes small details of great beauty, like the birds in pens at Roias and the Castle of Laboreiro.

A detailed study of the work shows however that arms Duarte also paid attention to other important details. Minho river, for example, show caravans and large ships in Caminha at the mouth of the river. In addition to the written comments, the drawings themselves reveal the great power of the author's observation and attention to the essential part of the dept of the manuscript: the fortresses, that is, the walls, albarrã towers and keep, barbicans, breastplates, turrets, and battlements. The work is considered as living testimony of Sketching of current illustration technique at the time of King Manuel I. The author states in panoramic, the paths between each village with the distances, main access, state of roads, the land conformation, watercourses and navigability, bridges, fountains, wells, crops and orchards, military buildings, religious and civil, and others, in some cases even the neighboring Castilian village. The same is repeated in relation to plants, where it indicates the size, type and state of the defenses, height and thickness of the walls, distance between towers and turrets, purpose of magazines, access and others. Regarding the instruments used by the professional, the work illustrates the use of the spear (which at the time replaced the medieval stick), the string and the compass.

== List of Castles ==
Except as noted, the Book of Fortresses has two views and a plan of all these castles and Raianos places. The given order is the one that appears in the work, which shows the author's route during their study trip in 1509.

Fortress	Image	Notes
Castle of Castro Marim		
Castle of Alcoutim		
Castle of Mértola		Page 122. The plan of the Castle of Mértola is the one on the top left side.
Castle of Serpa		Page 8 and 122. The plan of the Castle of Serpa is the one on the bottom left side.
Castle of Moura		Page 122. The plan of the Castle of Moura is the one on the top right side.
Castle of Noudar		Page 122. The plan of the Castle of Noudar is the one on the bottom right side.
Castle of Mourão		
Castle of Monsaraz		
Castle of Terena		
Castle of Alandroal		
Castle of Juromenha		
Castle of Olivença		Page 24.
Castle of Elvas		
Castle of Campo Maior		Page 28. Badajoz in the distance.
Castle of Ouguela		Page 30.
Castle of Arronches		
Castle of Monforte		
Castle of Assumar		Page 35. No plan.
Castle of Alpalhão		
Castle of Castelo de Vide		Page 44.
Castle of Marvão		Not visited.
Castle of Portalegre		Not visited.
Castle of Alegrete		Not visited.
Castle of Nisa		Page 48.
Castle of Montalvão		Page 50. No plan.
Castle of Castelo Branco		Page 52.
Castle of Idanha-a-Nova		
Castle of Segura		
Castle of Salvaterra do Extremo		
Castle of Penha Garcia		
Castle of Monsanto		Page 61 and 62. Northern view on the left side and Southern view on the right side, with Penamacor on the distance.
Castle of Penamacor		Page 64. Monsanto in the distance.
Castle of Sabugal		Page 66.
Castle of Vilar Maior		
Castle of Castelo Mendo		
Castle of Castelo Bom		
Castle of Almeida		Page 73 and 74. Beside the Portuguese flag, this castle also as the personal banner of King Manuel I.
Castle of Castelo Rodrigo		
Castle of Freixo de Espada-à-Cinta		
Castle of Mogadouro		
Castle of Penas Róias		Page 60.
Castle of Miranda do Douro		Page 83. Beside the Portuguese flag, this castle also as the personal banner of King Manuel I.
Castle of Vimioso		
Castle of Outeiro de Miranda		
Castle of Bragança		Page 89.
Castle of Vinhais		Page 92.
Castle of Monforte		
Castle of Chaves		Page 95.
Castle of Montalegre		Page 95 and 97.
Castle of Portelo		
Castle of Piconha		Page 101.
Castle of Castro Laboreiro		Page 103.
Castle of Melgaço		Page 105.
Castle of Monção		
Castle of Lapela		Beside the Portuguese flag, this castle also as the personal banner of King Manuel I.
Castle of Valença		Page 112. Tui in the distance. No plan.
Castle of Vila Nova de Cerveira		No plan
Castle of Caminha		Page 115.
Castle of Barcelos		Page 117. No plan. Not in the frontier but visited once.
Castle of Sintra		Page 119. Not in the frontier but visited 3 times.
