= Castle Monforte =

Castello Monforte or Castle of Monforte may refer to:

- Castello Monforte, Campobasso, Italy
- Castle of Monforte, Chaves, Portugal
- Castle of Monforte, Monforte, Portugal
- Castle of Monforte, Figueira de Castelo Rodrigo, Portugal
