= Castle of Melgaço =

Building in Viana do Castelo District, Portugal

Coordinates: 42.1144°N 8.2597°W

The Castle of Melgaço is located in Vila parish, Melgaço municipality, Viana do Castelo district, in Portugal.

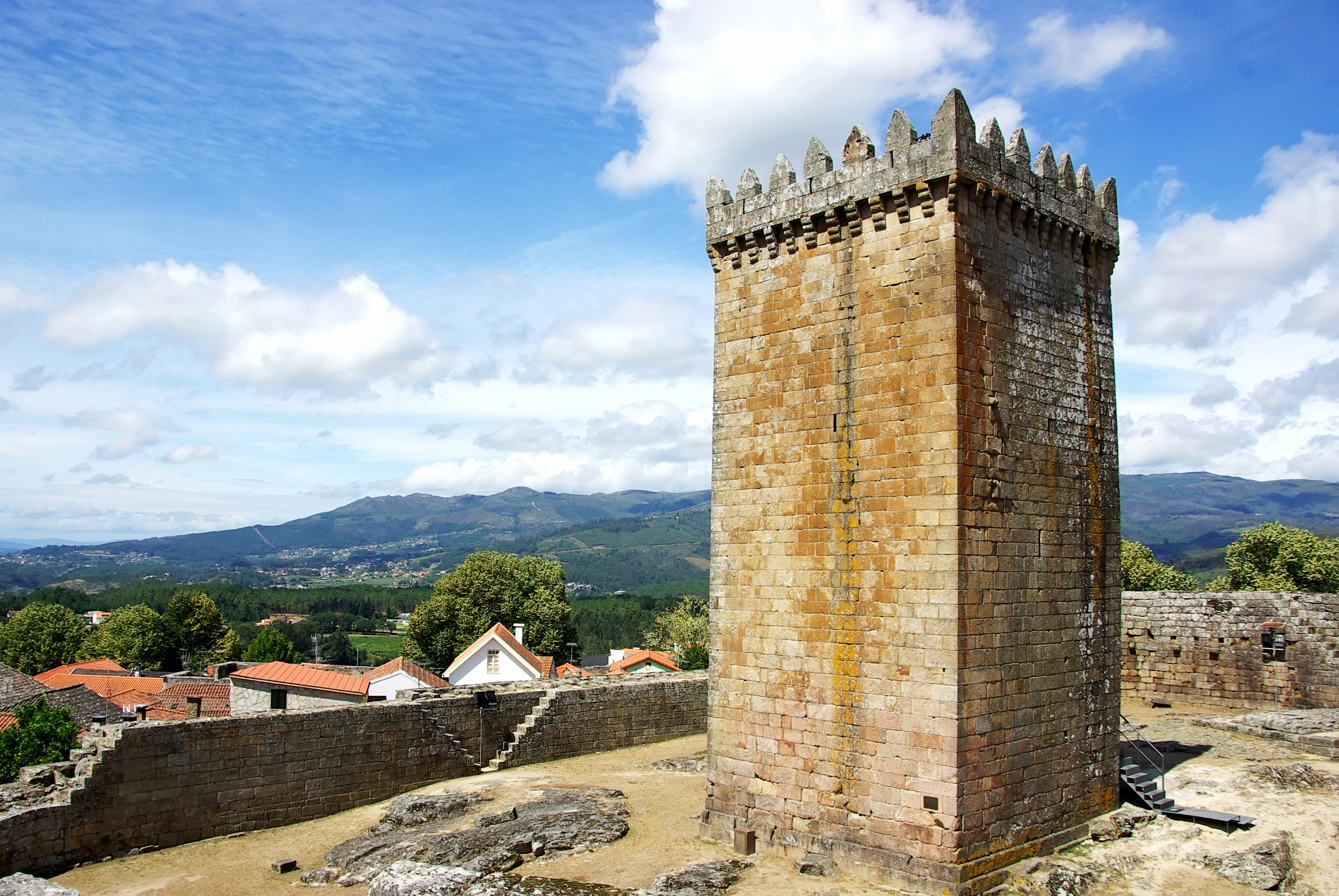

As the main defense of the crossing of the Alto Minho river to Galicia, it constitutes the most northern sentry point in Portugal from the twelfth century.

== History ==
=== Medieval era ===
The construction of the castle dates back to 1170 by order of the first King of Portugal Afonso Henriques (1112–1185). He granted a Foral charter to the town at the same time, encouraging the development of the town.

Afonso III (1248–1279) granted to the village in 1258 a second Foral Charter, promising privileges to the town.

In 1361 the traffic between Portugal and Galicia was required to pass through Melgaço demonstrating its importance at the time.

In the context of the 1383-1385 Portuguese succession crisis, the village and its castle followed the northern region of Portugal by expressing loyalty to Beatriz. It fell into Spanish hands but in early 1387, then governed by a Spanish mayor, the town suffered the harassment of the Portuguese troops under the command of John I (1385–1433), resisting their take over for nearly two months.

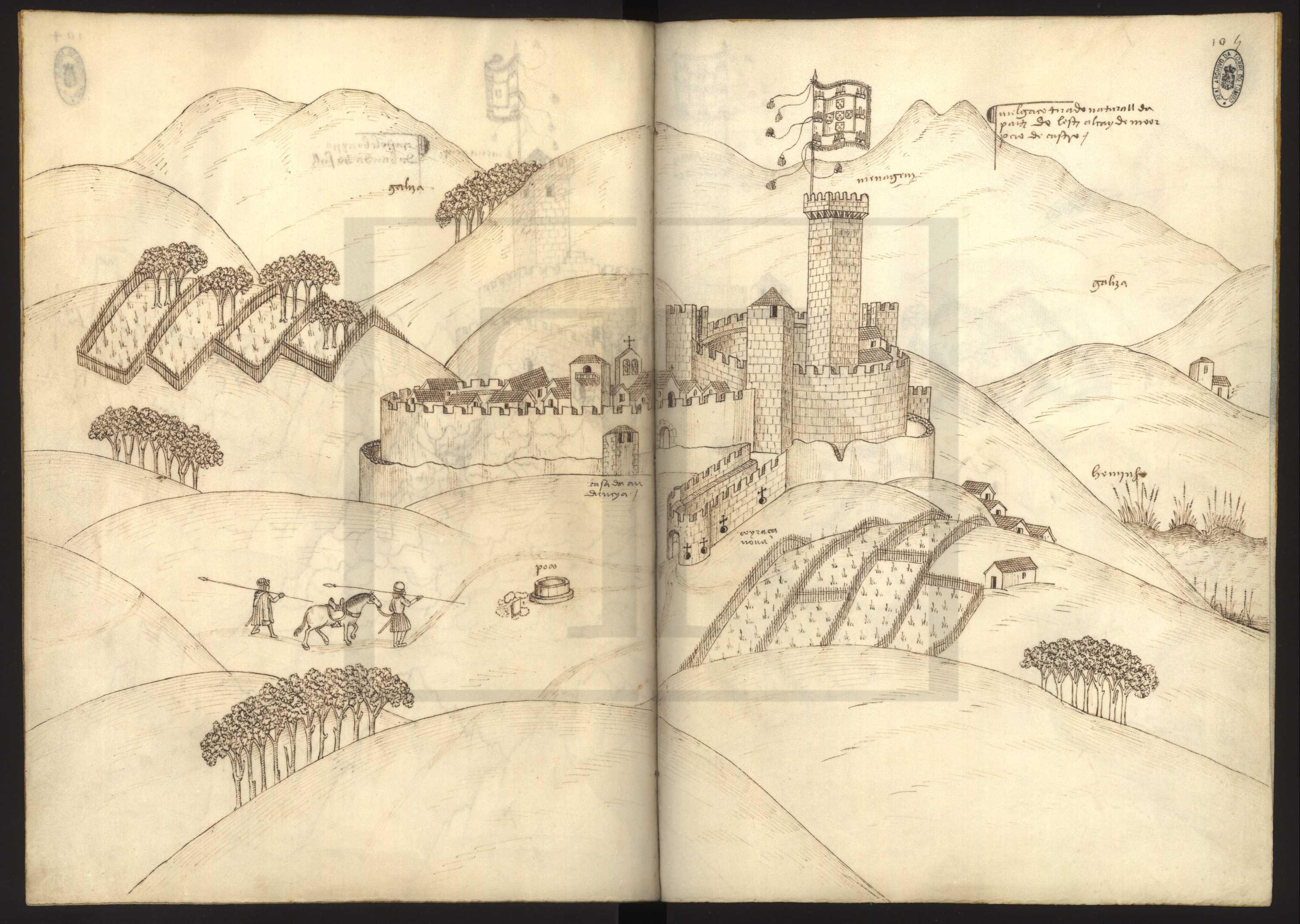
Castle of Melgaço in 1509 (Book of Fortresses)

In 1492, Melgaço was one of only five places along the Spanish-Portuguese border where the Sephardic Jews expelled from Spain could enter Portugal. Still under the reign of King Manuel I, village defenses and its castle layout are figured in the Duarte de Armas (Book of Fortresses, c. 1509), made up of three towers and two gates.

=== Present day ===
It is classified as a National Monument by decree published on June 23, 1910, and the wall of the village been classified in the same way, with publication on February 19, 1926.

The intervention of the government, however, only came to be felt in the 1960s, keeping the construction characteristics of the set. Recently, with the development of the village's historic core recovery projects, the keep of the castle was reclassified as a museum center, exposing the testimonies obtained by archaeological research.

== Architecture ==
The castle has plant in circular shape, unusual in the country, divided into three precincts. The walls, where they tear two doors are surmounted by prismatic battlements and reinforced by three towers, the main one being that is focused on the urban core, pentagonal section. The set is dominated by the keep. The keep has a square shaped plan, isolated in the center of the parade ground. Both she and the surrounding wall were fully rebuilt, inferring to its Romanesque feature only the design of this set: a solid square tower isolated in the center of the walled enclosure. The tower is divided internally into three floors, illuminated by some chinks. The crown is made by a shot in counter with battlements, now reclassified as lookout of the archaeological museum established in the tower dependencies. Regarding the doors, they are two: the main gate to the west, larger, go to the square of weapons, which opens a cistern, where he would find the commander's residence; and the betrayal door to the north, smaller. They remain part of the Barbican on the main door and towers that flanked one of the doors of the fence. Thanks to recent archaeological research, which laid bare significant stretches of gothic fence, we can now make the idea of the original design.
