= Castle of Caminha =

Castle in Portugal

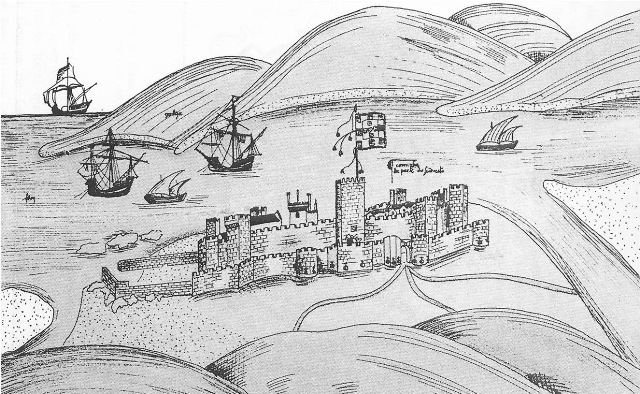
Caminha viewed from the South ("Livro das Fortalezas", 1510)

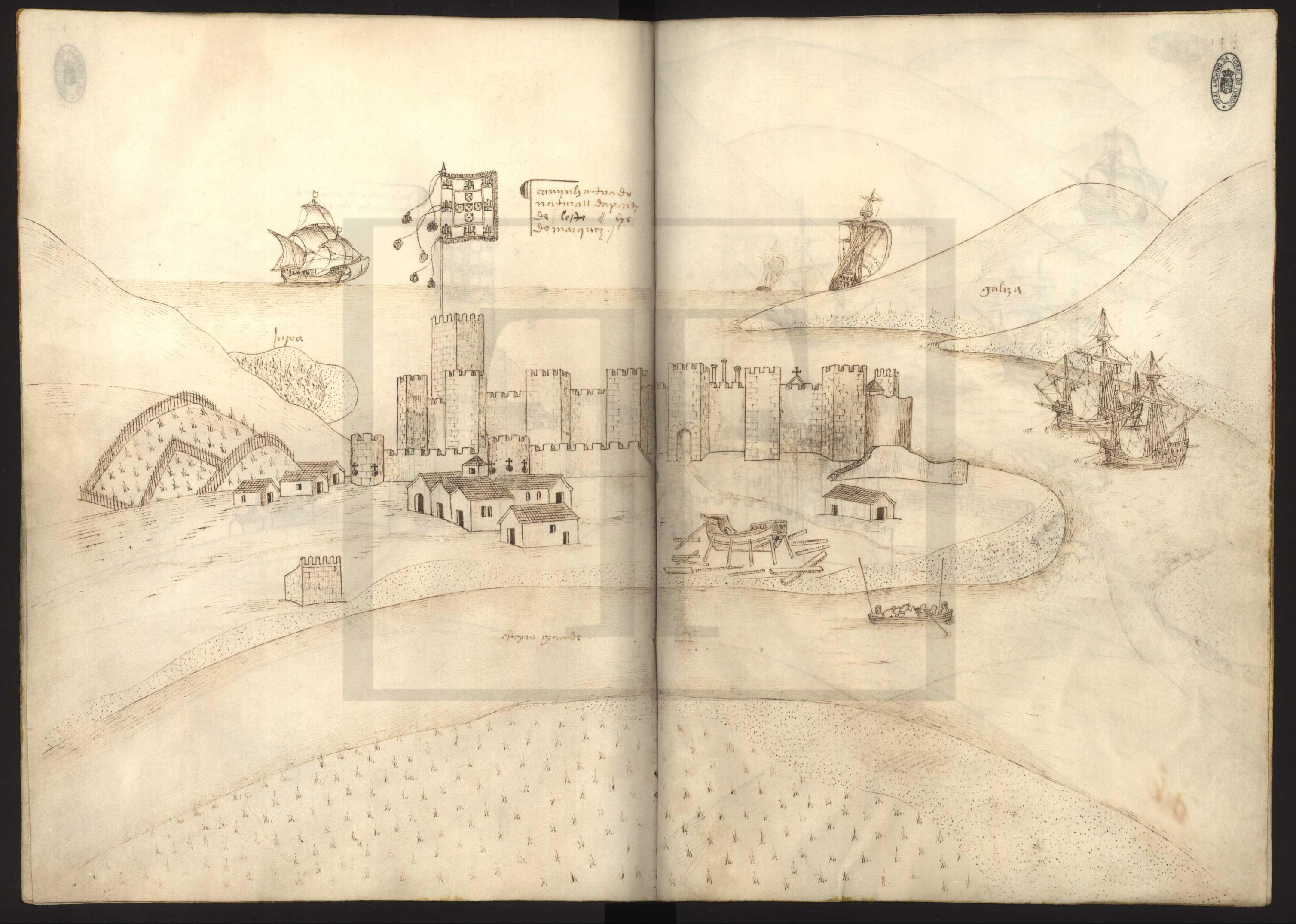
Caminha viewed from the East ("Livro das Fortalezas", 1510)

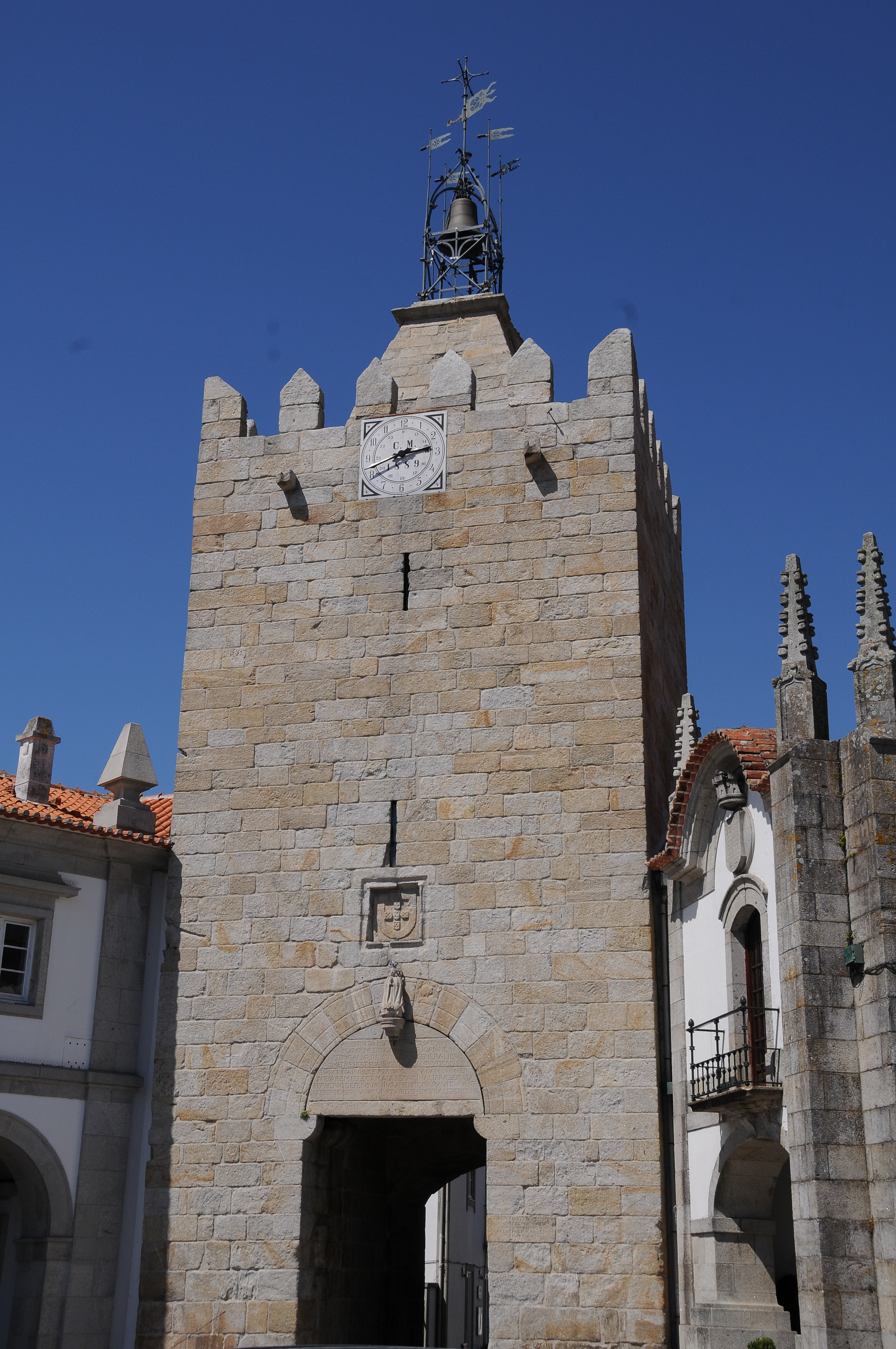
Old castle keep of Caminha, turned into a public clock tower in the 17th century. Its gate leads to the historical centre. The building to the right is the municipality.

The Castle of Caminha (Portuguese: Castelo de Caminha) is a medieval castle located in the village and county Caminha, in the Portuguese district of Viana do Castelo.

== History ==
=== Early history ===
It is believed that the early human occupation of their site dates back to prehistorian times. At the time of the Roman invasion of the Iberian Peninsula, it was endowed with a fortress, whose foundations date back to the fourth and fifth centuries.

=== Medieval Era ===
The defences were reinforced and expanded during the Christian Reconquest. During conflicts with Castile, its settlement and defense were encouraged under the reigns of King Afonso III (1248–1279), King Denis (1279–1325) and John I (1385–1433), due to the strategic value that this lindeira town represented for the kingdom.

With the closure of the 1383–1385 Portuguese interregnum crisis, the village supported John. The new King John I helped the village and garrisoned by a second line of walls. Under the reign of King Manuel I (1495–1521), the town and its castle are recorded in drawings by Duarte de Armas in his Book of Fortresses, c. 1509.
