= Castle of Freixo de Espada-à-Cinta =

Castle in Freixo de Espada à Cinta, Bragança, Portugal

- Castelo de Freixo de Espada-à-Cinta
- Bragança, Douro, Norte in Portugal
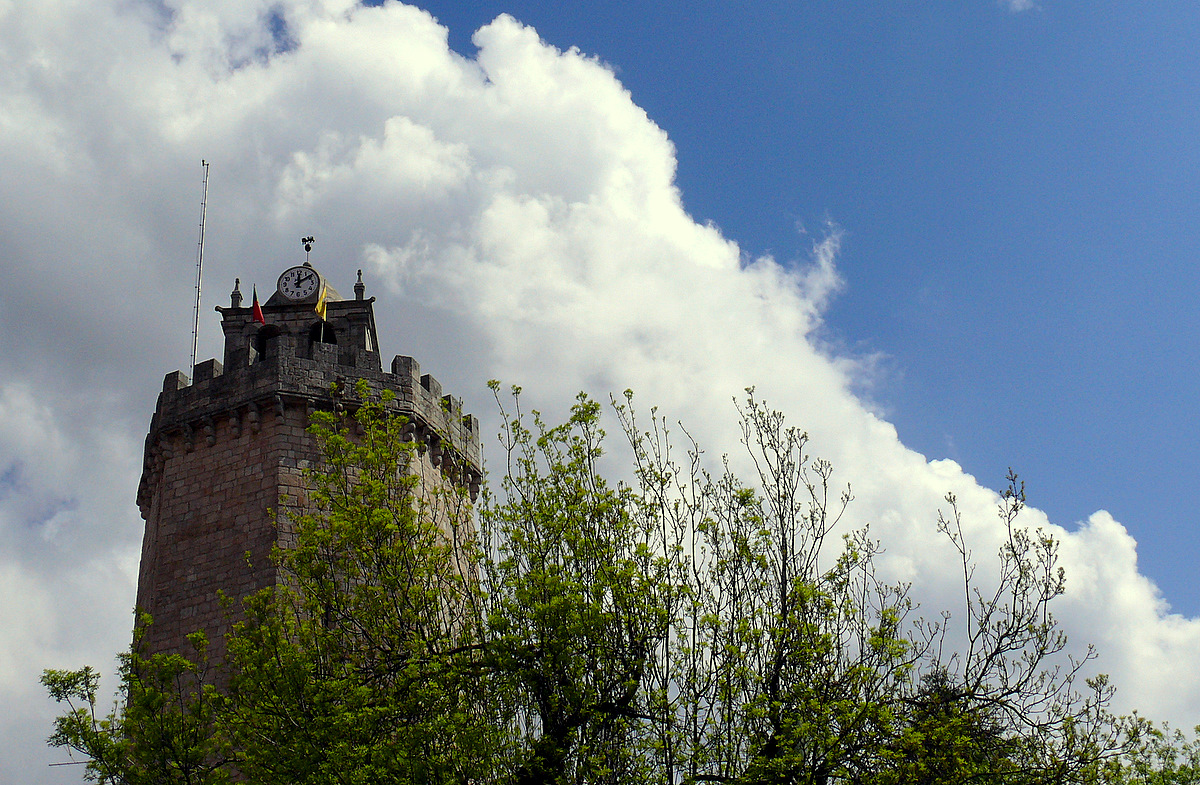
- A view of the "Tower of the Rooster", the ex-librus of the castle of freixo de Espada-à-Cinta

Site information
- Type: Castle
- Owner: Portuguese Republic
- Open to the public: Public

Location
- Coordinates: 41.0927°N 6.8042°W

Site history
- Built: 12th century
- Materials: Granite, Opus vittatum, Masonry, Bronze, Schist

The Castle of Freixo de Espada à Cinta (Portuguese: Castelo de Freixo de Espada à Cinta) is located in the civil parish of Freixo de Espada à Cinta e Mazouco, municipality of Freixo de Espada à Cinta, in the Portuguese district of Bragança.

== History ==
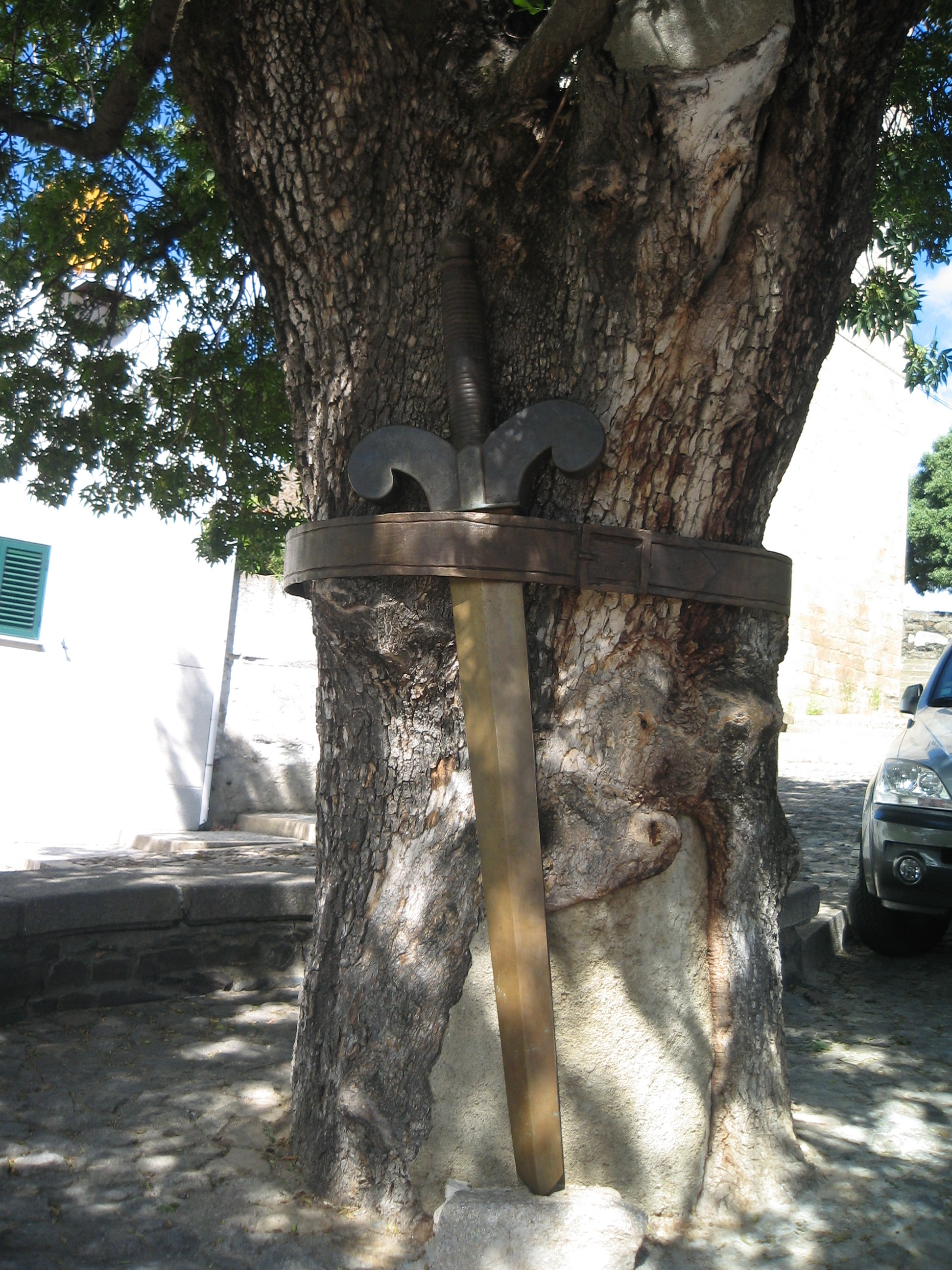
An ash tree with a sword, symbolizing the legendary sword and ash trees on which the town was founded

The castle of Freixo de Espada à Cinta is one of the oldest Transmontanan fortresses, being documented since the 12th century, as a course several created by D. Afonso III and D. Dinis.

In 1152, D. Afonso Henriques first ceded a foral (charter) to Freixo, referring it as the settlement of "Fresno". It is presumed that the construction of the fortress occurred following this regal letter, but there are only references to work completed in 1258. From this date, it is probable that in the 12th century, a primitive redoubt, eventually with a wall to defend the settlement, which was eventually occupied by Leonese forces between 1212 and 1213.

Between 1212 and 1213 it was occupied by forces loyal to the kingdom of León. But, King D. Sancho II of Portugal donated Alva and its town to the municipality of Freixo in 1236, ordering the expulsion from the locality of all those inhabitants that lived there during the Leonese occupation. A foral was re-conferred in 1246, by his successor, King D. Afonso II to formalize the move of the town.

The 1258 Inquirições (inquiries) it was established that King D. Sancho II had donated the settlement of Alva to Freixo, and that the Church of São Miguel was obliged to pay two parts of its rent to the municipality for public works at the castle. The same king conceded the fortifications of Urrós, which was located in the wilderness, for fear that it could be occupied by the neighboring kingdom.

In the 13th century, following the foral signed by D. Afonso III, dated 1273, the castle was the object of an extensive campaign of public works. Little is understood as to the extent of the work realized, due to the destruction of the group, especially the work done during the reign of King Dinis (who resettled and ordered the construction of the castle). A new foral was conceded by King D. Afonso III.

During the 14th century, in the words of Rui de Pina, King D. Dinis "populated anew" the castle in Freixo. In 1342, the Freixonitas made a request to the King to apply a "terça" of the parochial church for public works on the castle.

In 1376, a letter from King D. Fernando referred to the construction of "regal apartments" in Freixo. Another letter determined that the towns of Urrós and Maçores should cease to pay for the repairs of the fortifications of Freixo and began to serve the public works in Torre de Moncorvo. The town was donated to Fernão Afonso, master of Valença in 1381. Soon after (1383) work restarted on the castle.

Privileges were conceded on the town, in 1406, by King D. João I, in acknowledgement for its support during the 1383–85 Portuguese interregnum.

Designs by Duarte D'Armas (1509-1510) show a castle with circular barbican and rounded western entrance with machillitons. The southern battlements were decorated with parallelepiped merlons, while in the north (which was in a state of semi-ruin) was a false gate. To the south of the entrance was a cylindrical corbel with two orders of cruciform battlements, without merlons and with intermittent vaults. The castle, also circular, was circuited by various towers and corbels of varying sizes and forms. In the extreme east, alongside the false gate is a rectangular tower of two registers, with ceiling tile, two small windows in the north and another in the south, a balcony with machillotians, with another two crowning the walls linking to the tower keep. The rectangular keep tower with facade crack, is marked by merlons with three balconies with machicolations; Duarte D'Armas indicated in the legend that the tower was four registers, with a last floor topped with vaulted ceiling. Following this is a smaller pentagonal tower, crowned with machialliations. On the right of the principal gate is a hexagonal corbel with balcony and machicolations and surmounted by two bell towers with two iron crosses, one with two bells and another referred to as d'El-Rei. On the left is a taller octagonal tower with comparable damage, crowned by machicolations with merlons. In the north is a hexagonal corbel, followed by a semi-circular corbel, rectangular ledge and a new hexagonal corbel with balcony and machicolations. In the castle courtyard are two cisterns. On the outside of the castle, to the west, are town homes, the parochial church in the east (with a Manueline doorway), the Church of Santa Maria de Vilar in the west and farther to the north, the Chapel of São Brás. In the east are cultivatable lands, extending to the Douro River and the Castilian castle of Vilibestre.

In 1512, D. Manuel conceded a new foral. The following year, there were new works on the castle, under the direction of master mason Pêro Lopes. Between 1527 and 1532, in the national "Numeramento", the town was identified as having a "good castle, strong, circled, where no have more than one alcalde" with 447 homes. Masterbuilder António Fernandes executed work on the castle in 1569, by order of the monarch.

By 1758, the garrison on site comprised a lieutenant and twelve men. Between the 17th and 18th century, the belfry over the tower of Galo was constructed; by 1800, the castle was still in a good state. But, by 1836, the courtyard was being used as a municipal cemetery, with the first burial occurring on 8 July 1836.

During the 20th century, there were excavations carried out in the tower, revealing that there were no dungeons or dependencies in the under floors. There was a proposal to remove the cemetery within the courtyard in 1972. The DGEMN executed works on the battlements and merlons in stone, resurfaced the pavement of the parapet; covering in plastered masonry; demolition of the staircase and repair using stonework. A year later the walls and joints were cleaned; the accesses and layout were arranged, including landscaping and valorization of the area around the castle. The following year the walls were repaired. Between 1970 and 1973, thirteen buildings were demolished to alleviate the tower structure, resulting in the arrangement of the accesses and new landscaping. A further four buildings were removed between 1974 and 1978, resulting in further work around the castle.

In 1980 work on conservation were begun: repaving; repair of joints; substitution of stonework and placement of tilework in the intermediary floor of the tower. Two years later, the watchtowers and accesses were repaired; repair of the granite masonry along the handrails and the walkways and staircase accesses, in addition to the Portuguese pavement stone. By 1983, the tower was in an advance state of degrade, resulting in studies by the Grupo da Pedra and laboratory analysis by INIC. In 1983, the DGMEN replaced the stone masonry with granite stone from primitive quarries in the town; washing and brushing of masonry; and the application of silicone on all facades. Between 1983 and 1984, further conservation work on the parapets occurred with the substitution of deteriorated stone and reconstitution of the foundations and base of the embattlements, with schist stonework, including repair of joints and cleaning. Work on the walls, staircases, placement of slabs and windows, landscaping of the surrounding areas, including the installation of electrical devices began in 1984. Consolidation of the walls continued between 1985 and 1987, with the shoring of the foundations; placement of new schist to reinforce and consolidate the foundations; leveling of the walls and application of schist masonry; cleaning of brush/vegetation, including the extraction of roots.

In 2000, a plan for intervention on the site was initiated supported by FEDER.

The C.M.F.E.C. decided to create a cultural route that included the parochial church, the pillory, the Galo Tower, Handicrafts Centre and the Casa Junqueiro residence. From the work of Mário Jorge Barroca, the Galo Tower being quite high, was used as the keep tower, since it was larger than the then original keep tower ("22 poles versus 19 poles" high).

== Architecture ==
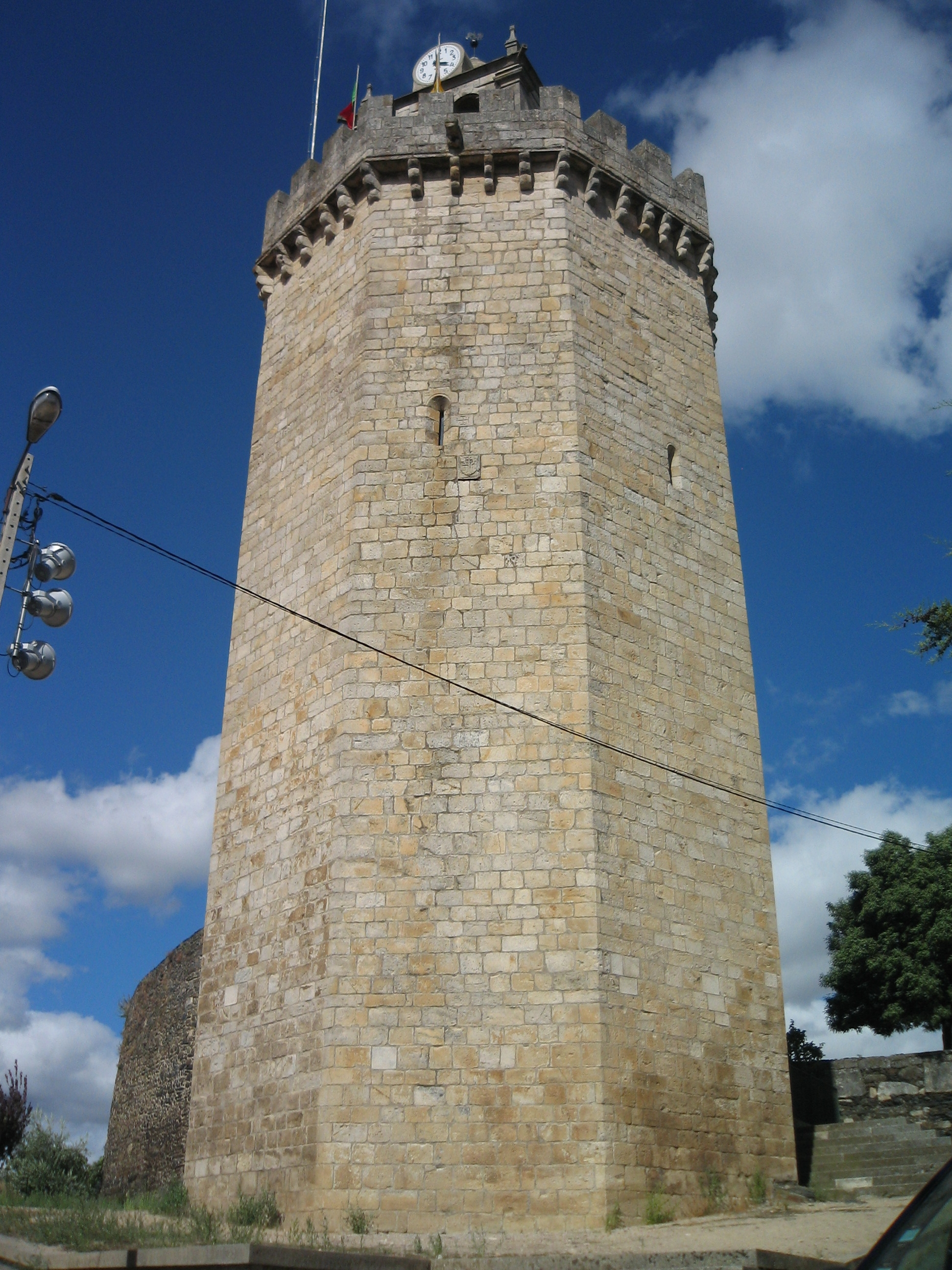
A view of the tall "Tower of Galo" that marks the castle site

The castle was situated in an urban context. The tower was situated in an elevated position, integrated into the historic centre, erected to the north of the parochial church. A little further from the site, to the west, is the Church of the Misericórdia. The primitive space within the walls of the castle is occupied by a cemetery, reusing the ruined foundations of the fortification walls.

The principal Renaissance element is the high, scenographically-refined heptagonal tower, commonly referred to by locals as the Torre do Galo or simply the Torre do Relogio. But, the architecture of the medieval castle were constructed in Gothic style, resembling the castles of Alva and Mos. The old castle keep, figured by Duarte de Armas (c. 1509) along with the seven-sided tower, did not survive to the modern era.

Castle remains are dominated by an irregular heptagonal plant tower, towering 25 metres (82 ft) high, is accessed through a door. Its interior is divided into three floors, with vaulted arches and accessible by stairs, lit by small slits in the walls. At the top, there is a running counter supported by corbels. The set ends with a bell tower square, with needle-like coverage with the corners rounded small pyramids.
