= Castle of Castelo Bom =

Medieval castle in Castelo Bom, Almeida, Portugal

- Castelo de Castelo Bom
- Guarda, Beira Interior Norte, Centro in Portugal
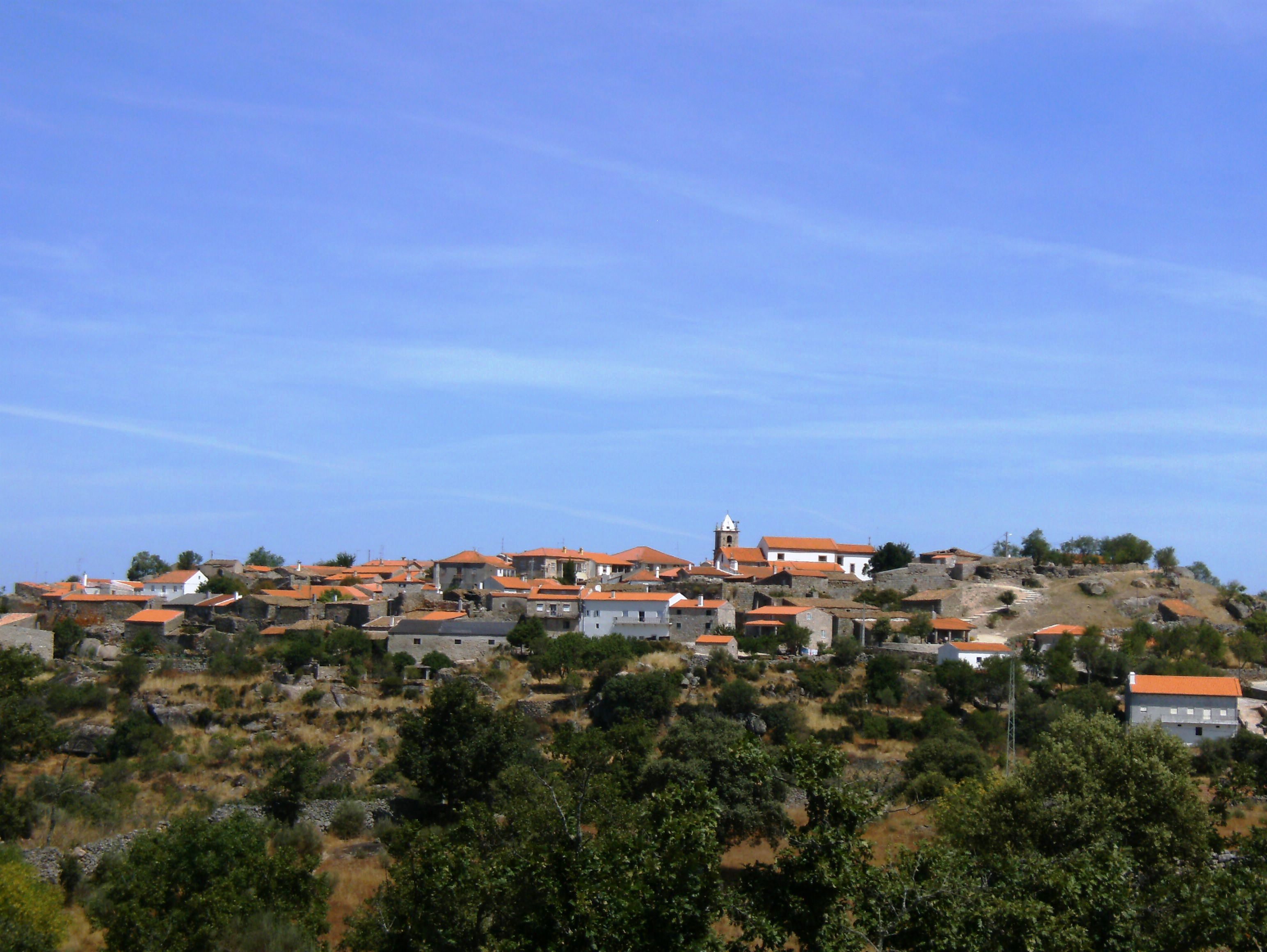
- View of the hilltop of Castelo Bom showing vestiges of the two walls and keep tower

Site information
- Type: Castle
- Owner: Portuguese Republic
- Operator: Câmara Municipal de Almeida (ceded 20 October 1942)
- Open to the public: Public

Location
- Coordinates: 40°37′18″N 6°54′6″W

Site history
- Built: 12th century
- Materials: Granite, Masonry

The Castle of Castelo Bom (Portuguese: Castelo de Castelo Bom) is a medieval castle in the civil parish of Castelo Bom, municipality of the Almeida in the district of Guarda in the Centre region of Portugal.

== History ==
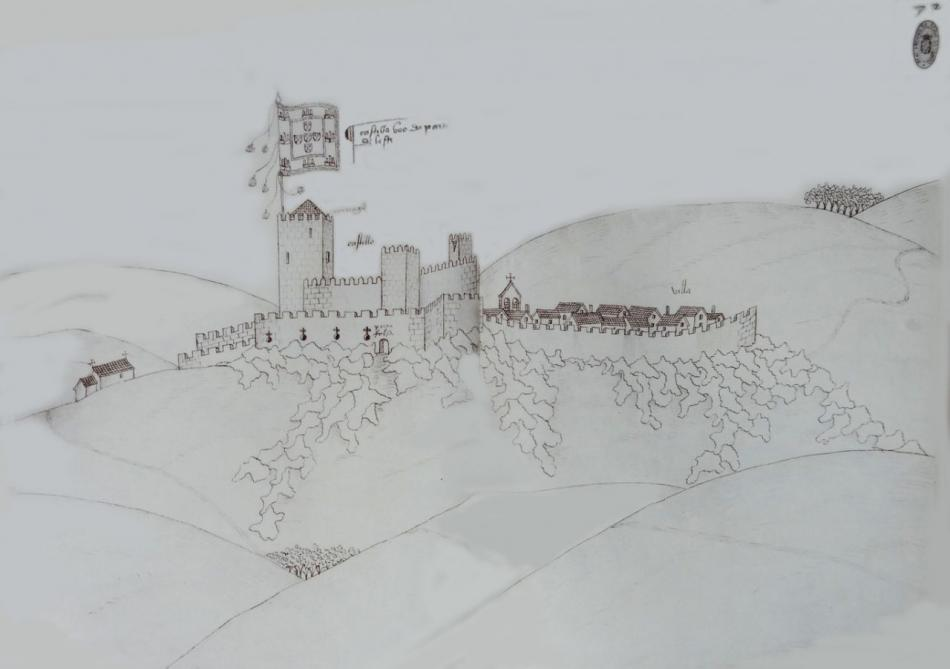
A design of Castelo Bom by Duarte de Armas (1509)

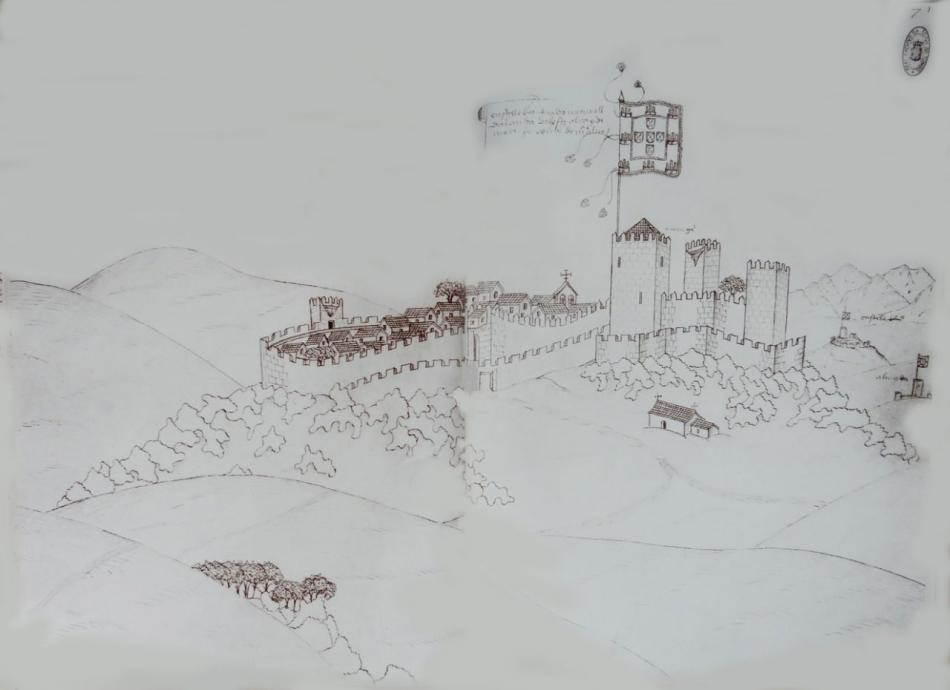
Another drawing from the Book of Fortresses (1509) showing the layout of Castelo Bom

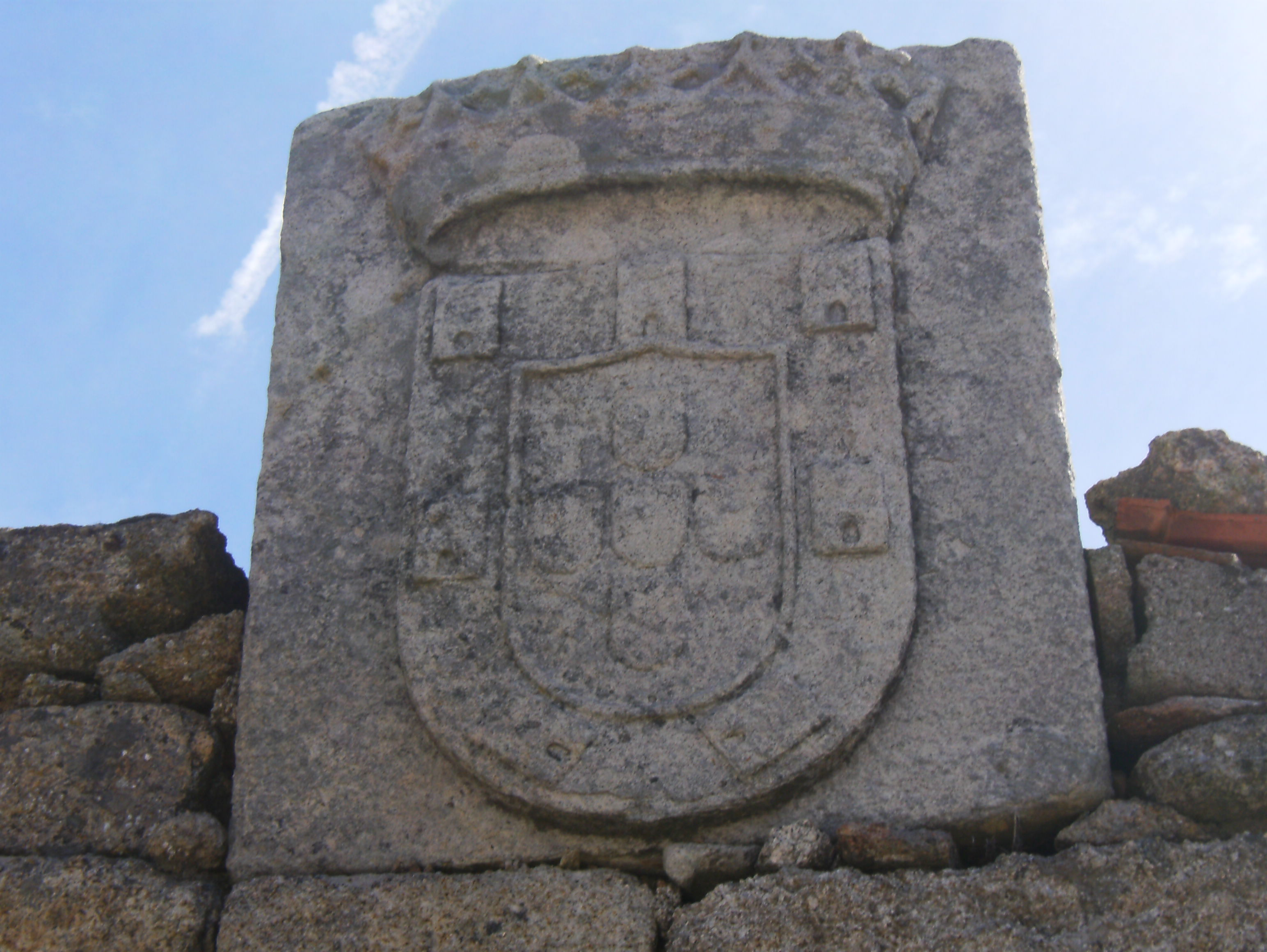
The coat-of-arms along the fortification wall: one of several that were reused

Archaeological vestiges dating from the Bronze Age suggest that a castro existed on the site. Specifically, the archaeologists identified a pistiliforme sword, dating the late Bronze Age, found on the locale (but later transferred to the Museum of Guarda).

Castelo Bom was part of an area of disputed lands between Portugal and the Kingdom of León between the 12th and 13th century. During this period, Castelo Bom was in the advance guard against León, resulting in its early medieval plan. During the 12th century, it was occupied and operated by the León, but the settlement was conquered in 1282 by Portuguese King D. Dinis, who immediately ordered it structural reinforcement. The same king conceded to the region a Foral (charter) in 1296, and it was integrated in to the Kingdom of Portugal as a result of the Treaty of Alcanices.

Between the 13th and 14 century, the castle was reconstructed, along with the wall fortifications. By 1496, the formal institutional Inquirição (Inquiries), noted the existence of a population of 234.

In the 16th century, Francisco de Anzinho and Garcia Fernandes worked at the castle to refortify the installation. Designs by Duarte de Armas, in his Book of Fortresses (1509) for the castle drew the castle annexed to the southern extremity of the town walls. These drawings included the castle and barbican, both of an irregular plan. The castle was crowned by merlons and encircled by adarve, but with a western rectangular tower keep (covered in tiled roof) backed up to a central courtyard, earthen works, a cistern, a shaded house and other dependencies. In the east, is a similar rectangular tower with "dungeon" and in the north, a rectangular tower beside the gate: both towers were in states of ruin. The barbican, with adarve, merlons and cruciform slits, included a circular tower in the south and minor rectangular tower in the north, flanked by a door (and a complimentary false door in the east). The fortifications consisted of a double line of walls with steps in the west and doors: rectangular doors to the exterior and rounded doors to the interior. The interior doors were surmounted by covered balcony with machicolations. Both lines of walls included Chemin de rondes and crowned by parallelepiped and pyramidal merlons in the northeast, over a rectangular tower covered in partially-ruined pyramidal merlons facing the interior. Within the walls the urban agglomeration consisted of single-family homes overlooking a church with bell-tower in the south, while in the southwest and southeast were smaller chapels. To the south, the castle was in viewing distance of the castles of Almeida and Castelo Rodrigo.

In 1510, King D. Manuel I renewed the foral, and ordered the repair of the castle and fortifications. But, these works did not begin until 1512, under the direction of João Ortega, from Penamacor, and mason Pero Fernandes, with overseer Rui de Andrade, who was discharged by the King. The medieval Numeramento, carried out in 1527, identified a population of just under 396.

In the 17th century, the Viscount of Vila Nova de Cerveira and Marquesses of Ponte de Lima, was appointed alcalde-mor, who installed two artillery-pieces and constructed a bastion tower with vaulted space occupied by a jail. During the Restoration Wars, it was an important frontier defense and served as a shelter for the governors of Beira, when the cisterns (the Poços de El-Re and Poços da Escada). It was mentioned in the 1758 Memórias Paroquiais.

The town and castle began its progressive decline in 1762, when the town was encircled and overrun. J. Almeida referred to the existence of watchtower in the Cabeço da Medronheira, dating to the 18th century, but where no vestiges exist. By the second decade of the 19th century, the French invasion of the peninsula resulted in the destruction of the castle, and the revision of the administrative authority resulted in the extinction of the municipality of Castelo Bom (in 1834). The castle's defensive structures progressively fell into ruin.

By the 1950s, the keep tower remained intact, but the descendant of its original owners wanted to construct a court for donkeys (F. Keil do Amaral).

The castle was already in ruin and partially buried by 1987, when a study was elaborated by the Direcção Geral dos Edifícios e Monumentos Nacionais (DGMEN) in order to recuperate the urban centre and the castle architecture. Work on the site began, innocuously with the clearing of the village gate in the 1940s, but proceeded to more elaborate consolidation of the cistern and the area around the resource by 1966. In order to attract more tourists to the site, an overlook was constructed in 1999 (in the north). Work to rehabilitate the facades of the historic centre were initiated at the same time, as part of the Aldeias Preservadas project, between the local government and the building's property-owners.

== Architecture ==
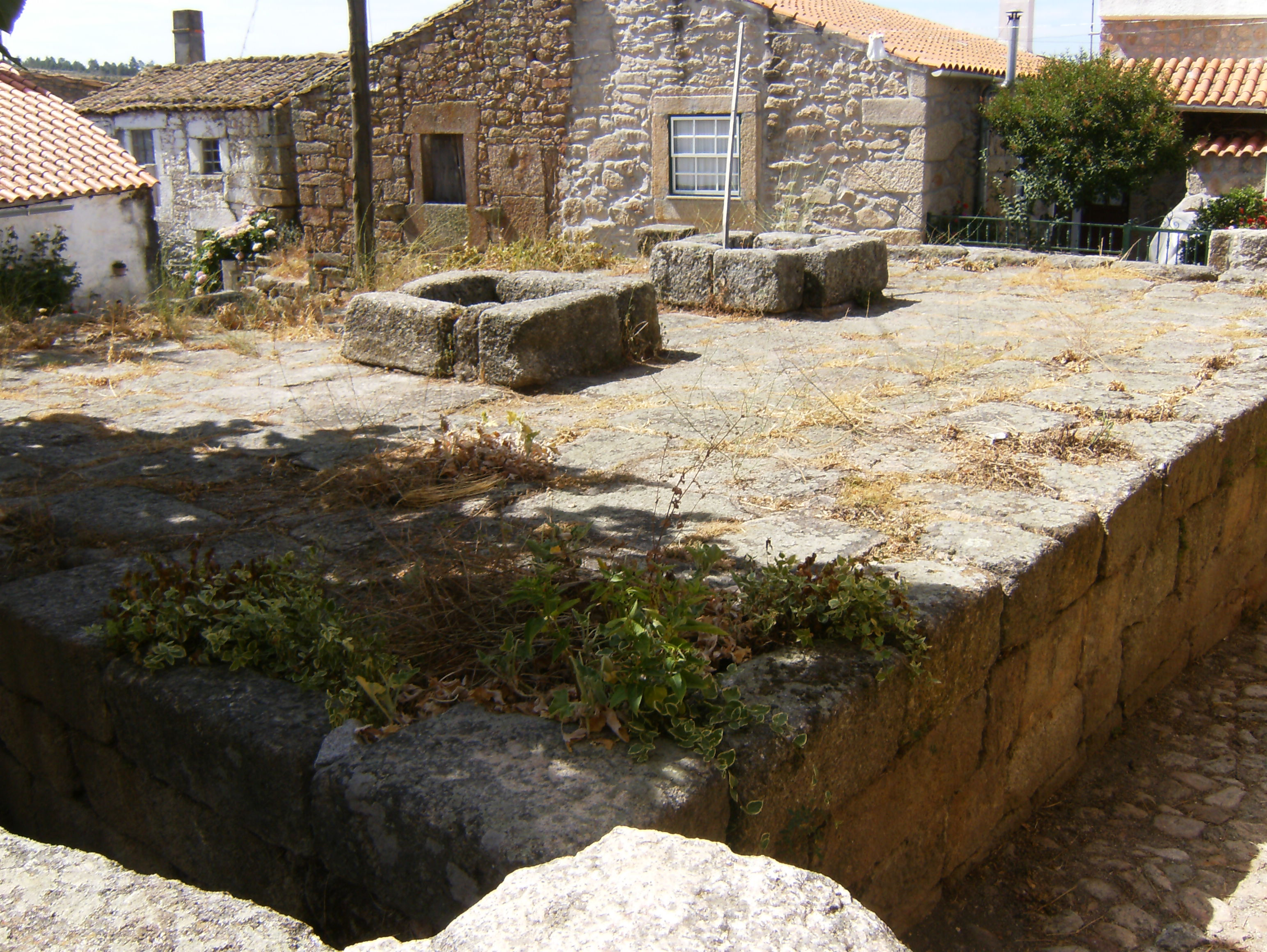
The Poço d'El-Rei supplying water to the former castle and embattlements

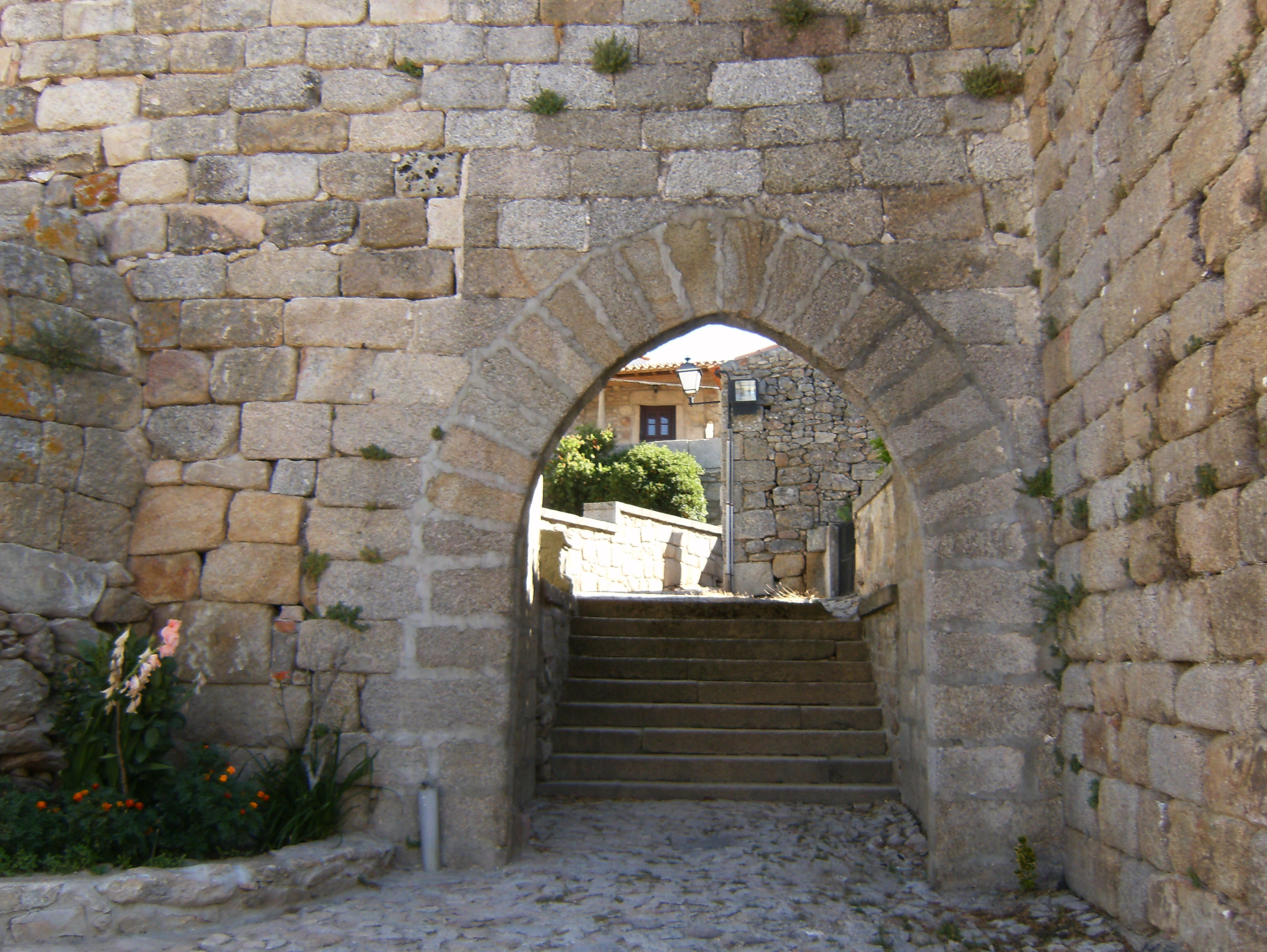
Remnant of the Town Gate

The castle, implanted at the top of a 725 metres (2,379 ft) hilltop and its walled fortifications encircling the settlement. Overlooking the Rio Côa, the cliffs of its flanks are without buildings, except along the southeastern roadway. It is relatively close to the castles of Almeida and Castelo Mendo.

The irregular plan is almost rectangular, and includes a similarly irregular barbican with a curved face along the settlement wall (today incomplete), a sequence of almost continuous walls along the east and the flanks of the northwest and northeast. These final walls are missing merlons and various discontinuities, with various buildings addorsed to its walls. Some of these buildings also include stonework that could have been reused from the wall. The Town Gate consists of a curvilinear exterior and simple arch, with uneven pavement under a vaulted ceiling. On the interior wall, there is a lance of stairs providing access to the adarve and lateral rectangular tower, in ruins, on the west and north. Along the line of walls in the south, is a coat-of-arms of the ancient town, that was likely moved from its original location.

Locally referred to as the Poço do Rei (the King's Pool), the cistern in situated in the south, consisting of a rectangular plan covered by tile. It is accessible from a door, the unique opening. In the interior, the space included a vaulted ceiling structured with two archways.

The powder magazine, variously called the revelim, rebolim, rebolinho or polvorim, is circular plan in stonework and masonry, with door to the west.

Two other pools provide support to the fortified courtyard: the Poço de Escada and the Poço de El-Rei. The first is situated in the Largo do Poço da Escada, and consists of an irregular square plan in masonry and in the southeast there is a nine-step stone slab staircase to the water, with the interior walls without decoration. The Poço d'El Rei situated in the square of the same name, is also rectangular and consists of a reservoir of grande dimensions in stonework, and covered by terrace, accessible by a double-flight of frontal stairs and landing. Over the terrace are two square openings, with stone guards, acting as light source. Its interior consists of a vaulted ceiling.
