= Castle of Castelo Branco =

Medieval castle in Castelo Branco, Portugal

- Castelo de Castelo Branco
- Castelo Branco, Beira Interior Sul, Centro in Portugal
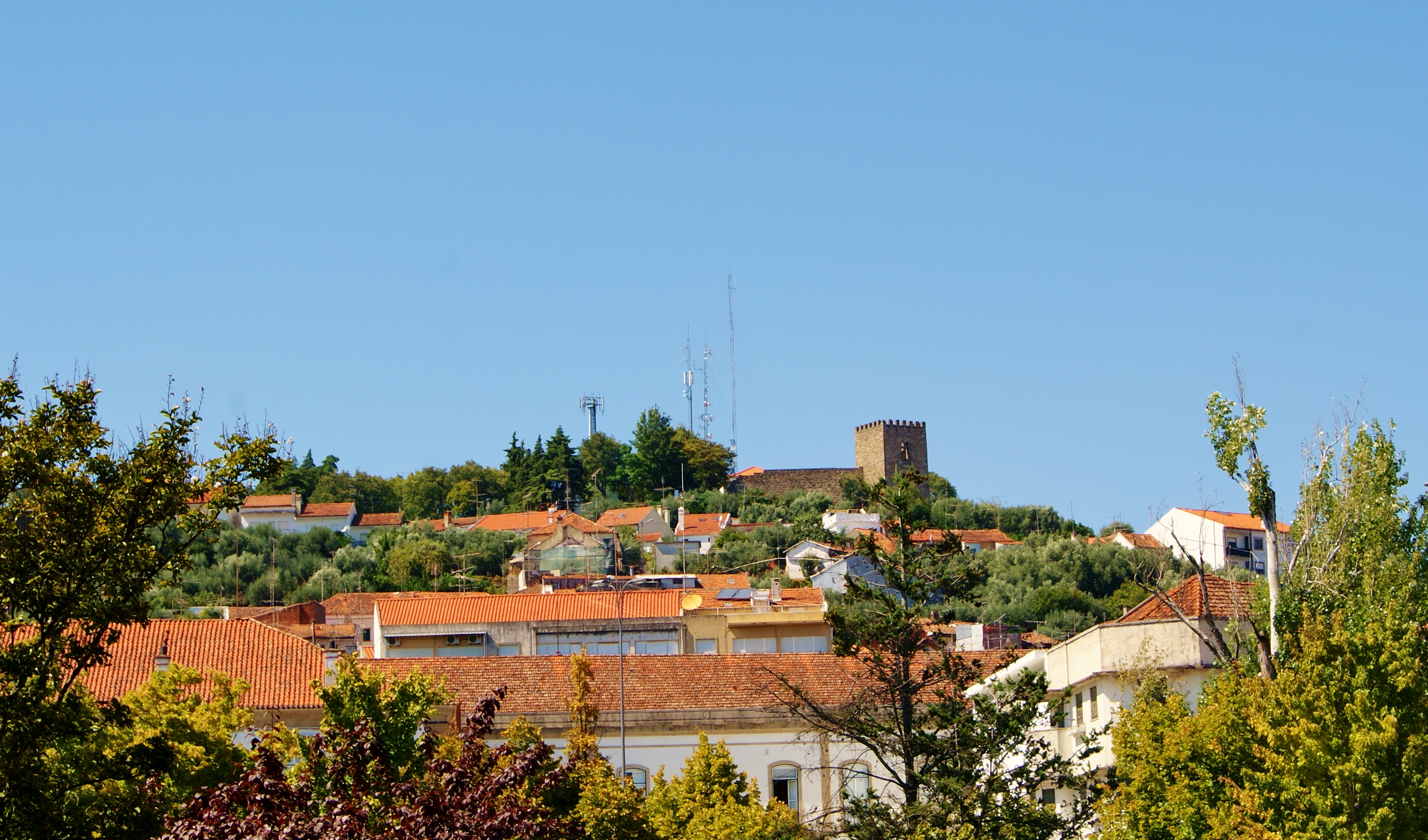
- A view of the skyline of the municipal seat of Castelo Branco, with the eponymous castle in the hilltop.

Site information
- Type: Castle
- Owner: Portuguese Republic
- Open to the public: Public

Location
- Coordinates: 39.8255°N 7.4960°W

Site history
- Materials: Granite, Iron

The Castle of Castelo Branco (Portuguese: Castelo de Castelo Branco) is a Portuguese medieval castle in civil parish of Castelo Branco, in the municipality of the same name, in the Centro district of Castelo Branco. Known locally as the Castelo dos Templários (or Templars' Castle), the Romanesque castle was constructed under the orders of King Afonso II of Portugal in 1214.

== History ==
In 1165, the territory of that would become Castelo Branco was conquered from the Moors and donated to the Knights Templar, who at the time dominated Vila Franca da Cardosa. But, by 1198, King Sancho revised the donation so that half the lands of Castelo Branco were placed within the control of Fernando Sanches. Following the model of Ávila/Évora, in 1213 a foral (charter) was issued in 1213. By the following year Cardosa was bequeathed to the Order of the Templo, confirmed in a papal bull issued by Innocence III (in 1245) where, for the first time, the name of Castelo Branco appeared.

The first fortification wall was constructed by the Knights Templar between 1214 and 1230, thereby extending their defensive line with Tomar, Monsanto, Zêzere, Almourol and Pombal. Sometime in the last year, D. Simãeo Mendes, Master of the Knights Templar, ordered the construction of a palace for his knights commanders.

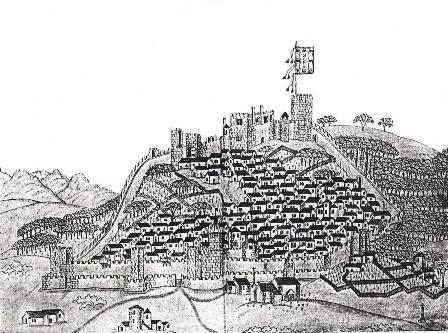
An engraving depicting the state of the castle during the medieval period

By the end of the 13th century, during the reign of King Denis the castle included four gates: the Golden Gate, the Gate of Santiago, the Traitors' Gate and the Pelame Gate. In the middle of that century a second curtain of walls was constructed that resulted in the existence of seven gates, rather than the three primitive structures. Sometime during this period construction on the keep tower, that was addorsed to the wall was executed, supported from taxes on cereal grains, wine, meat, hospital leftovers, bottles and residual funds from public wills to approximately 600 pounds.

The first reference to the castle's alcalde occurred in a donation letter dated 1 October 1357, when Martim Lourenço de Figueiredo was referenced as the responsible for the defensive structure. By 1408 description of the castle included details of three chambers, a tower and two horse stables (with its own kitchen), a cattle shed, barn and guardhouse (to guard the silver). In 1422 a barbican was constructed.

In the 1422 Rol dos Besteiros there is a reference to 6390 inhabitants, but by 1496 "Inquiries", there were just 839 people within its walls.

During the 16th century a palace was constructed, but only the tower remains to this day. Duarte D'Armas in his Livro das Fortalezas identifies a grand keep tower and palace building, the Palácio dos Comendadores (Palace of the Commanders) with orchard, a curtain of walls defended by five towers, including one with clocktower. The structure was described as constructed from worked stone, with limestone mortar, material easily wore away within the next years. By 1505 there was as a need to have Mateus Fernandes to analyse the need for work on the structure. The castle at that time included eight gates: "Ouro" (Gold) Gate, "Traição" (Traitors') Gate, "Espírito Santo" (Holy Spirit) Gate, "Relógio" (Clocktower) Gate, "Vila" (Town) Gate, "Esteval" (Stable) Gate, "Santiago" (St. Jame's) Gate and "Santarém" Gate. The need to repair the structure lead to the nomination of Álvaro Cardoso to receive the monies for the work on the castle on 20 November 1510. With the growth of the town, there were 1417 inhabitants, leading to the King John III to title the village as Notável (Notable) in 1535.

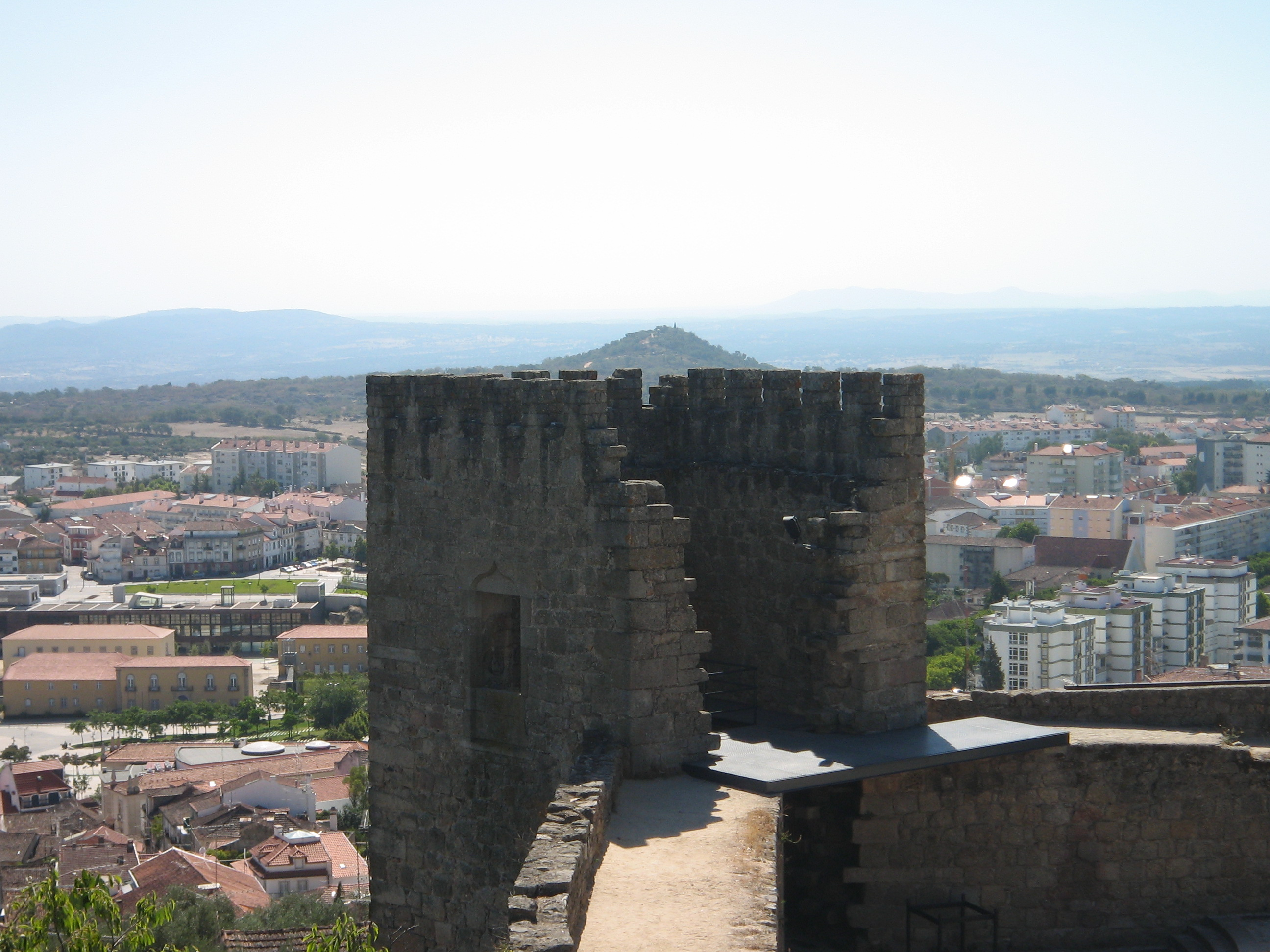
The city of Castelo Branco from the perspective of one of the destroyed towers, its stones most likely used in reconstruction work in the same town

In the 17th century, the last commanders inhabited the Commanders palace: D. Fernando and D. António de Meneses. On 22 May 1704, a Franco-Spanish force invaded the territory and battle at the castle resulted in the partial destruction of the walls. A capsule from 1706 describes the palace as having a masonry portico access with stables to the right and a cistern on the left, fed from rainwater collected on the Church of Santa Maria. The square was fortified with a wall, situated between church and palace. From the four-arch, covered-entrance is a wood patio in chestnut with corner guardhouse. To the left is a staircase with 28 steps alongside the kitchen, with two windowed rooms with fireplaces. The three-floor tower with singular window and garret, for the titular of guarda roupa, was connected to the keep tower.

In October 1753, the old keep continued exist in an optimal state of conservation.

In 1762, the square was sacked, during the events of the Seven Years' War; the square was ultimately disincorporated/demilitarized per the 1763 Treaty of Paris. This began a slow devolution of the importance of the structure, resulting in the 6 November 1769 extinguishing of the title of alcalde at the castle. Although the town was elevated to the status of city on 20 March 1771, and became the seat of the bishop, this did not stop the castle's decline.

In the first quarter of the 19th century, a new doorway was constructed to link to the barbican.

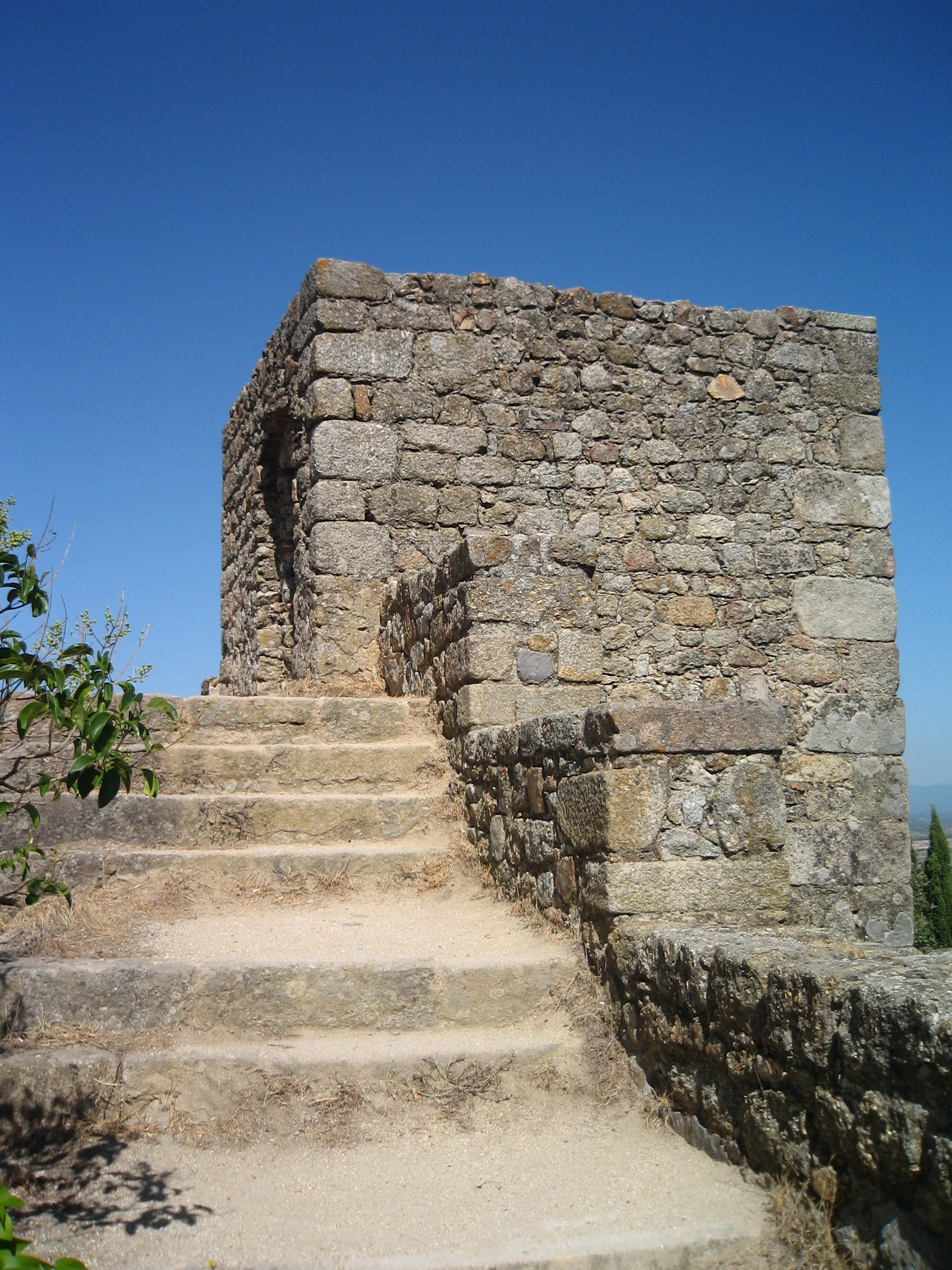
One of the remaining towers in the castle

During the course of the Peninsular War, during Junot's march to Lisbon, the castle was left in ruin. Some work was done in 1818 to remedy the damage. In 1821, stones from the castle were and palace were removed by local inhabitants in order to construct their own homes. On 17 July 1835, an ordinance from municipal council conceded a license to destroy the arches in the walls, and to reuse those stones for public projects. As a consequence, the stones forming the "Vila", "Relógio" and "Espírito Santo" Gates were destroyed and their stones used in the construction of the Ponte da Granja. A similar dispatch on 9 March 1839 allowed the sale of the stone from the castle, as well as roofing tiles and wood from the palace. It was followed by a similar provision on 20 March for a further group of tile and wood. In 1851, the municipal council studied the possibility of implanting a cemetery in the locale, but the idea was abandoned in 1864, owing to the location being excessively rocky.

In the second half of the 19th century, owing to the actions of the Civil Governor, Guilhermino de Barros, a few of the walls were reconstructed, in addition to the structures of the palace. But, on 15 November 1852, a violent storm destroyed the keep walls and other fortifications, resuscitating the original plan to convert the site into a cemetery and ceding the lands to the municipal council. Over the course of successive years there were attempts to repurpose the structure following periods of destruction and phases of initiative. Within ten years of the violent storm the "Postiguinho" Gate was destroyed. Between 1875 and 1876, construction began on adapting the former "palace" into a residence for the schoolteacher, but the plans were later abandoned. On 18 May 1893, the municipal council verified that the walls of the barbican of the "Espírito Santo" Gate was in a state of ruin, and risked the properties of three landowners, if the walls were not demolished or repairs concluded.

=== 20th century ===
By the beginning of the 20th century, the castle served little histo-cultural purpose and the municipal authorities used it a backdrop to local concerns. In 1929, the municipality constructed a public urinal along the wall of the Rua Vaz Preto. Within the next year, the last wall tower collapsed, after a period of ruin. In 1933, three water reservoirs were constructed, adjudicated to Manuel Figueira, in lands acquired for 6.000$00 Portuguese escudos.

A storm caused a landslide that destroyed the eastern/northern corner tower, leading to a formal request to the DGEMN to begin a project of restoration and lookout. Simultaneously, the municipality solicited ideas for the reconstruction of the castle from Engineer Manuel Tavares dos Santos, but lacking any funds, this project was abandoned. By 1975, the possibility of demolishing the wall along Rua Vaz Preto was examined: the DGEMN analyzed the walls along this corridor in 1977, in order to determine the viability, while the municipal authority expropriated homes along the segment of the walls.

In 1981, structures that belonged to the GNR, and which were addorsed to the walls along the Rua Vaz Preto were demolished. During the course of the demolition of houses along Rua Vaz Preto, part of the original wall and towers were re-discovered. This led to the 5 June 2009 proposal to seek a formal classification of the site's heritage status. On 26 October 2009, the DRCCentro requested the castle's classification as a Property of Public Interest. It was accepted on 28 October by the consultative council of IGESPAR, but the process was archived on 7 January 2013, and the site never obtained its classification.

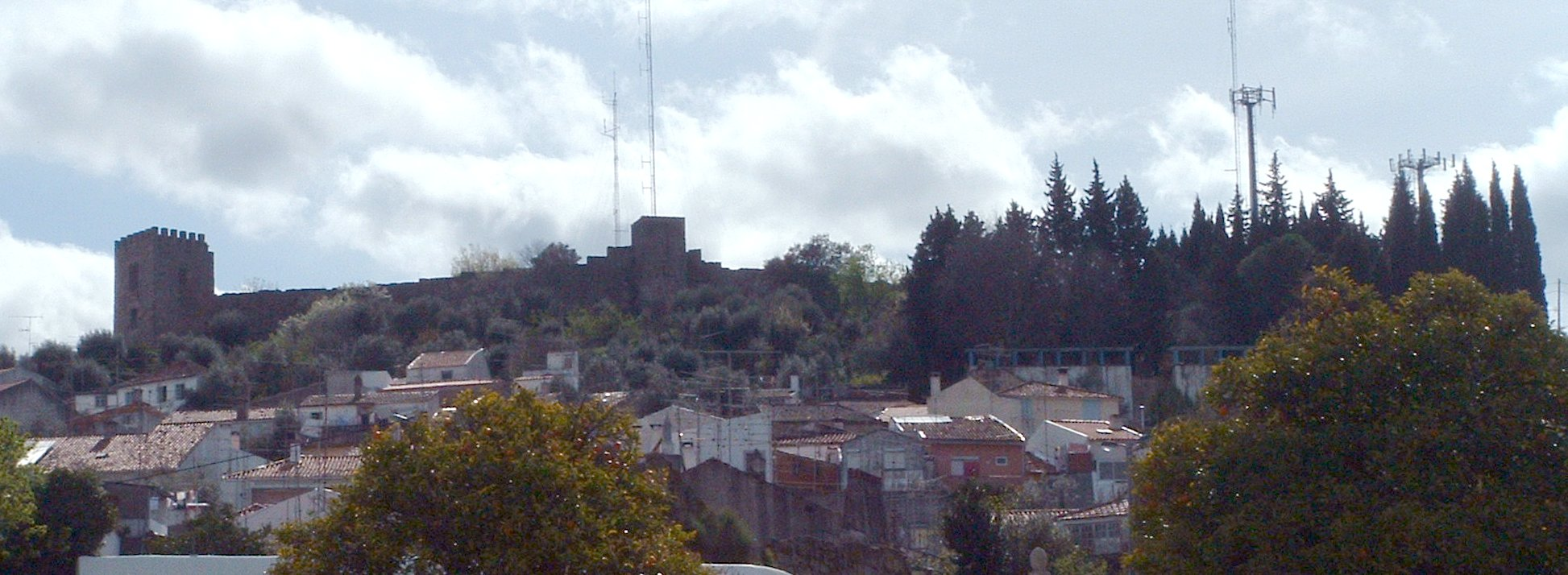
A view of the castle as seen from the municipality of Castelo Branco

== Architecture ==
The castle is located on a granite hilltop at approximately 470 metres (1,540 ft) within the Cerro da Cardoza, a region dominated in the southeast by the Serra de Monforte; the Serra da Gardunha and Serra da Estrela, to the north; and to the northeast, the frontier with Idanha-a-Nova. Other historical buildings immediately surrounding the castle include the residence at Rua D'Ega, 92, the Church of Santa Maria do Castelo and buildings used in the housing of pilgrims, the Casa dos Romeiros.

What remains of the castle is the line of walls, that connected one of the towers with the main keep of the commanders' palace. The 15th century defensive tower is laid out in the form of a rectangle, and is accessible within from a staircase.

The facade oriented towards the west is practically destroyed, but is marked by two balcony windows: one on the first and the other on the second floors. The second floor windows are actually dual windows with chamfered arcs. Meanwhile, the northern facade has a single window on the second floor, with rectangular lintel and arch.

Within the walls of the castle is the Church of Santa Maria do Castelo.
