= Torre of Lapela =

Building in Monção, Portugal

Coordinates: 42.05644°N 8.53816°W

Castle of Lapela
- Castelo de Lapela
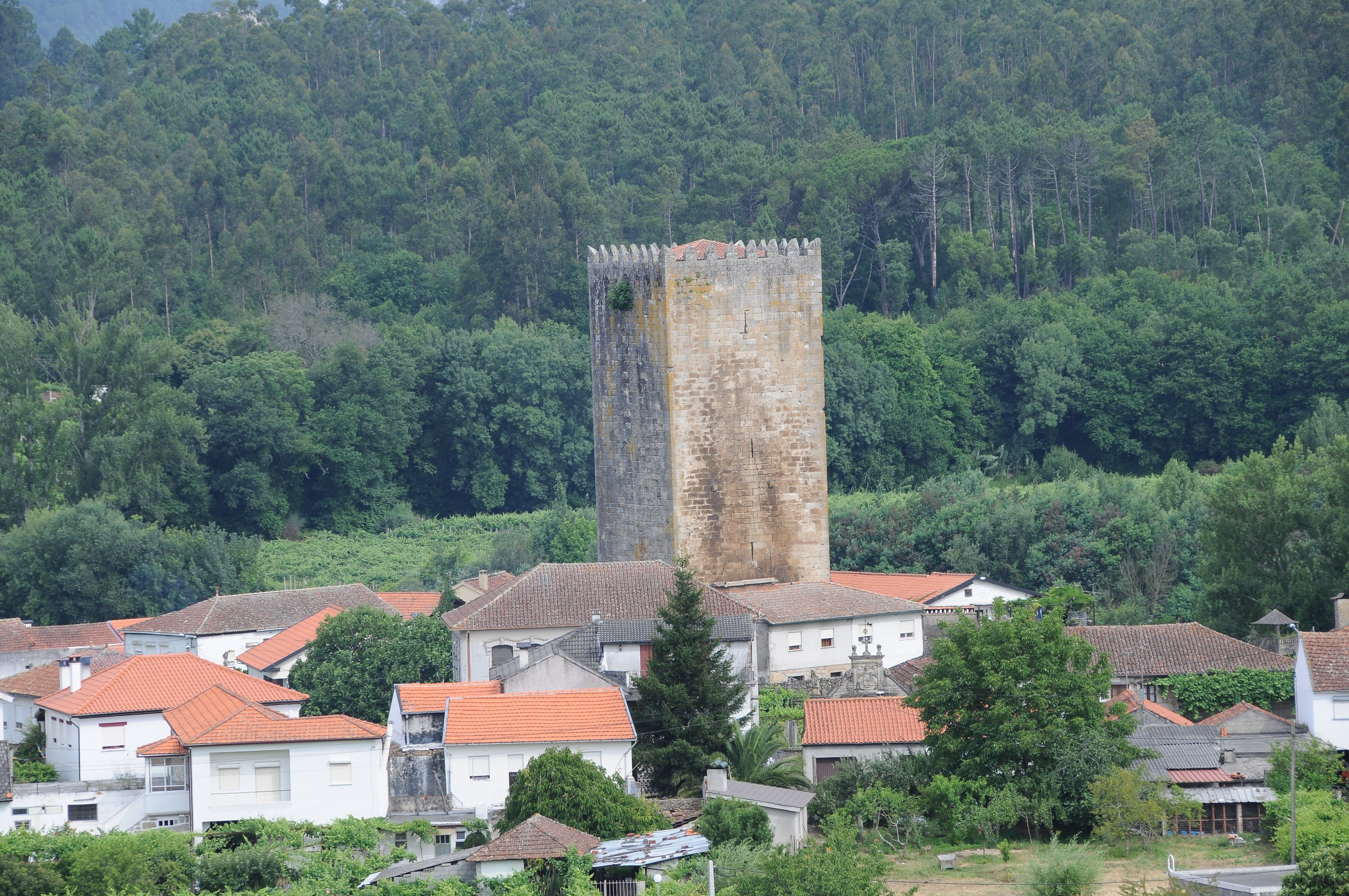
- The remaining tower

General information
- Status: ruined

The Torre of Lapela (Portuguese: Torre de Lapela) is a ruined medieval castle located next to the Minho River in the town of Lapela, in Monção municipality, Viana do Castelo District, Portugal.

== History ==
One tower is all that remains of the Castle of Lapela, which was situated a few kilometers downstream from the Castle of Monção, which defended the ford of the Minho. The historians P. Antonio Carvalho da Costa, Pinho Leal and José Augusto Vieira attribute its foundation to Lourenço Gonçalves de Abreu, lord of Merufe, Sanfins, Lapela, Barbeita, Regalados, and other lands of the Alto Minho. It is thought that because he had fought in the Battle of Valdevez next to King Afonso I and his father, Gonçalo Martins Abreu, Afonso I had the castle built and appointed him its first commander.

== Features ==
Constructed of stone ashlar, the square tower measures 10 meters on a side and 35 meters high. Its walls are three meters thick. It has a single entrance on the north facade about 6 meters above the ground, surmounted with the coat of arms of the Kingdom of Portugal.
