= Castle of Vinhais =

Castle in Bragança District, Portugal

Coordinates: 41.8350°N 7.0003°W

The Castle of Vinhais (Portuguese: Castelo de Vinhais) is a medieval castle located in the civil parish of Vinhais, municipality of Vinhais, Portuguese district of Bragança.

Its close proximity to the Kingdom of Castile made it influenced by the local architecture.

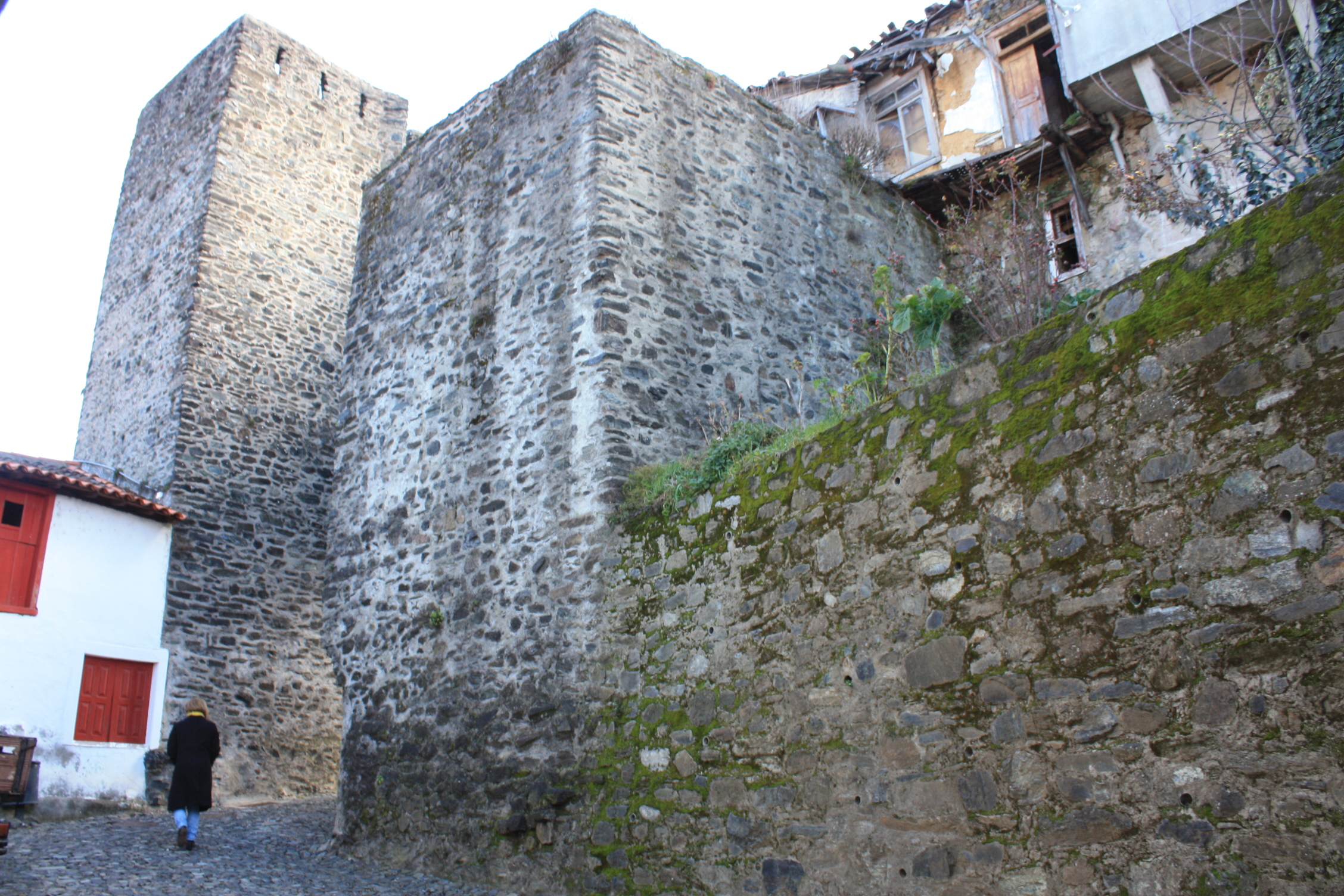
Castle of Vinhais, Bragança, Portugal

== History ==
=== Prehistoric ===
Human occupation of the region dates back to prehistoric times. The early humans left behind numerous archaeological remains, including rock art, and the megalithic monuments (dolmens) and forts.

=== Early history ===
Vinhais was originally a Galician settlement that was an occasional trade center. After the Romans entered Iberia the town was turned into a Galician-Roman fortress. Regarding the location of this primitive village, scholars are divided into three hypotheses:

- on a hill near the right bank of Tuela River, just north of the current site
- on the hill of the Vidueira; or
- on Mount Ciradela or Ciradelha, in the hills of the Crown.

These assumptions are justified by the appearance of Roman coins, traces of buildings of the ancient Roman city of Veniatia, and the remains Roman military road that connected Braga to Astorga (Asturica Augusta).

The Swabians and Visigoths established the village. A few centuries later the Muslim invasion of the Iberian Peninsula resulted in the increase of the castles.

== Medieval Castle ==
The Vinhais village is the result of the centralization of the territory of Tras-os-Montes in so-called "new towns" of initiatives under the direct control of the Crown, better-equipped to attract and organize the services for the people.

When the court clerks King Dinis (1279–1325) were preparing the 1320-1321 catalog, is not that the common Parish Church, which indicates that both the temple and the fortification have been very time-consuming construction. Will date from the reign of this sovereign, possibly from the late thirteenth century the completion of the village fence, supported by five or six towers, two of them flanking the gate. Not having citadel, the main tower integrated to the fence.

Records from the late thirteenth century show the completion of the village wall supported by five or six towers, two straddling gate. Since the village did not have a citadel, the main tower was integrated to the fence. Durante a crise de 1383-1385, o Alcaide-mor de Vinhais tomou partido por D. Beatriz, vindo posteriormente a reconhecer a soberania de D. João I (1385–1433). Esse processo não terá sido pacífico, uma vez que o seu Alcaide-mor, João Afonso Pimentel, revoltou-se em 1397 contra o soberano, passando-se para Castela, tendo a praça voltado à posse portuguesa apenas em 1403.

During the 1383-1385 Portuguese crises, the population of Vinhais sided with Beatriz, who later yielded to recognize the sovereignty of King John I (135–1433). This process has not been peaceful since its Alcaide-mor, João Afonso Pimentel, revolted in 1397 against the sovereign, going to Castile, and the square facing the Portuguese possession only in 1403.

Under the reign of Ferdinand (1367–1433), the castle was occupied by the forces of Castile between 1369 and 1371.

Later, under the reign of King Manuel I (1495–1521), the castle is assessed and recorded by the Duarte de Armas in the Book of Fortresses of 1509. The logs show general ill state of fortification: the side of the main gate, the inner face of the keep, facing the village, presents ruin and two of the remaining towers show wear on the foundations. This sovereign granted the new Foral New to the village on 4 May 1512.

=== From the sixteenth century to modern day ===
From the sixteenth century onward, despite having built one Barbican and additional towers, fortification saw the number of buildings attached to the old walls increase with the growth of the village. It is said that in 1527, the walls were already partly demolished.

In the context of the War of Restoration (1640–1668), the town and its castle suffered siege. In the words of Portuguese historian: "In 1666, finding itself in Lisbo, Count of S. João da Pesqueira (later 1st Marquess of Távora, created by D. Pedro II Ruler of 7 January 1670), governor of Entre Douro and Távora (.. .). however, the Galician general D. BALTAZAR PANTOJA, put to fire and sword the province of Tras-os-Montes. on 1 July 1666 entered by Montalegre, on 13 July fell on keys, on 14 July places of Faiões and St. Stephen, defended by the sergeant-major ROCK AZEVEDO Antonio, committing barbarities. Gathering-up D. BALTAZAR PANTOJA to Monterey, Galician square north of Verim, and after a few days oped on Portugal, entering by Monforte, he came to put siege of Vinhais, surrounding with his army the castle, which was defended by the governor MARIS oF STEPHEN with the villagers and another 50 helpers.

Several times occupied by the Castilians it became part of Portugal again in 1403. In 1659 a Spanish general invaded the region and besieged Vinhais with 1,700 men. The castle resisted and the enemy retreated across the border, burning all the houses outside the walls as well as all the villages they passed through.

Although seventeenth and eighteenth centuries saw some repair effort, these repairs were minor. In the twentieth century, the castle remains were classified as Public Interest Property by decree published on 28 June 1947. In the early 1960s, the City Council made an attempt to demolish the remaining parts of the castle when the population furiously opposed, furnishing up around the great memory. As a result, they were promoted consolidation and restoration work, the responsibility of the Directorate-General of National Buildings and Monuments (DGEMN) as left: three gates, two towers and some old sections of the fence, on the east side of the village. Recently, reports have given an account of the ancient towers in the old town of Vinhais, is about to collapse, putting in pedestrian and vehicular risk.

== Characteristics ==
Although not much remained of the old medieval set, under the reign of King Dinis, the village built a fence with plant in irregular oval shape, enhanced by five or six towers, two of which flanked the main gate. Without possessing fortress, the keep was built the fence, confirming the Gothic type of fortification. As recorded by bequeathed to us by Duarte de Armas in the early sixteenth century, the keep stands out as a whole, defending the main gate. This gate is topped by a solid tower, supported on the outer face, on two pillars of rectangular shape. A second door reveals the Barbican, border to keep. Facing the valley is a smaller door flanked by two turrets castellated. In addition, the fence, with a perimeter of about 500 steps, was reinforced by three turrets of quadrangular. Cubelo is shown to be next to the West, opened up the well, connected by a winding staircase adjoining the barcabacã. In so enclosure rose the houses and the Church of Our Lady of the Assumption.
