= Castle of Serpa =

Building in the district of Beja, Portugal

Coordinates: 37.9444°N 7.5985°W

- Castelo de Serpa
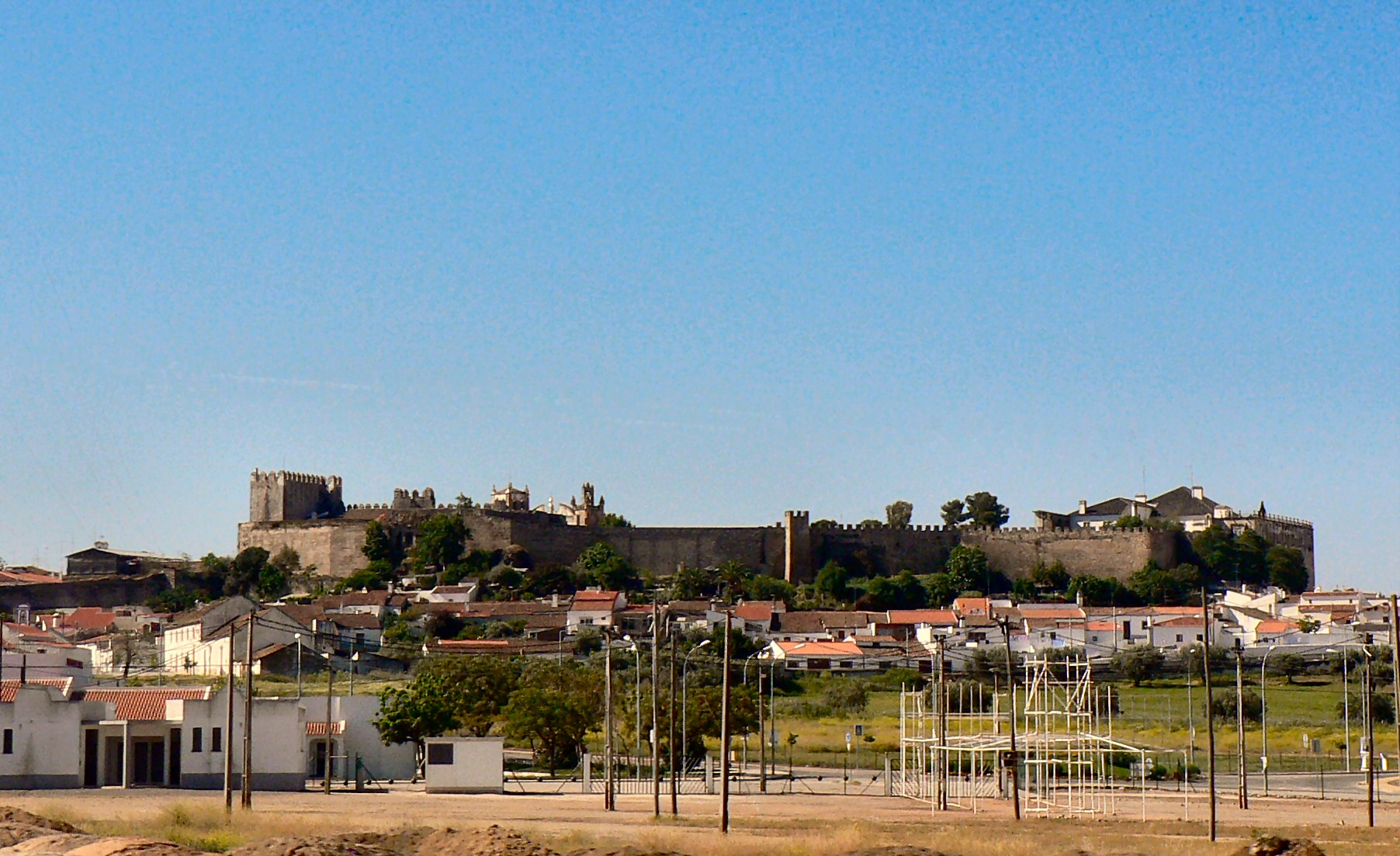

General information
- Status: reconstructed
- Architectural style: Gothic
- Town or city: Serpa municipality in the district of Beja of Portugal.
- Country: Portugal
- Completed: 13th century
- Height: 50 meters

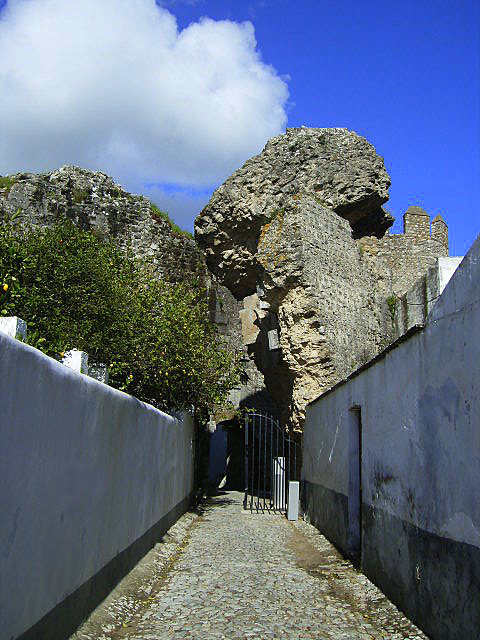
Castle of Serpa:entrance

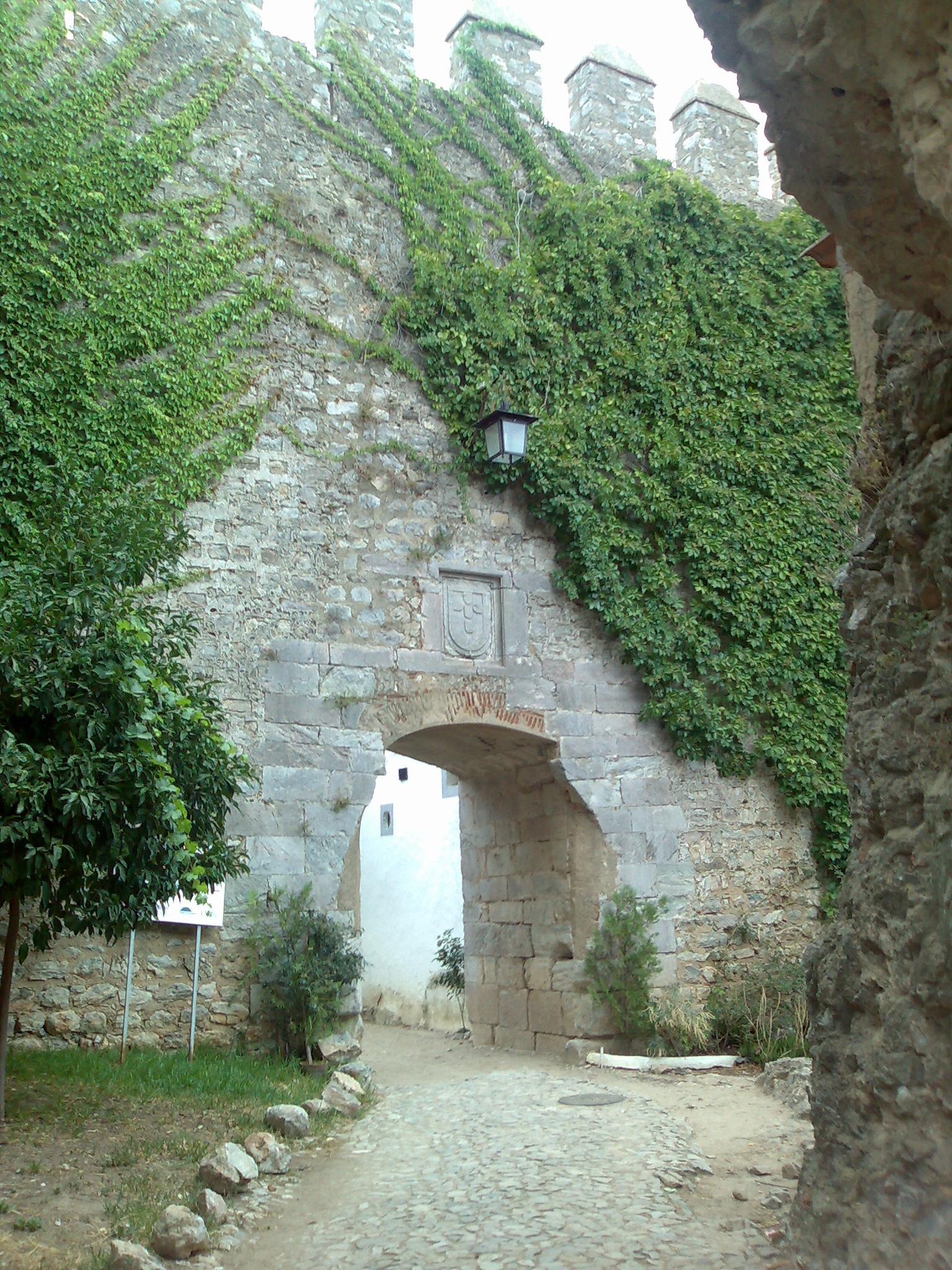
Castle of Serpa: entrance2

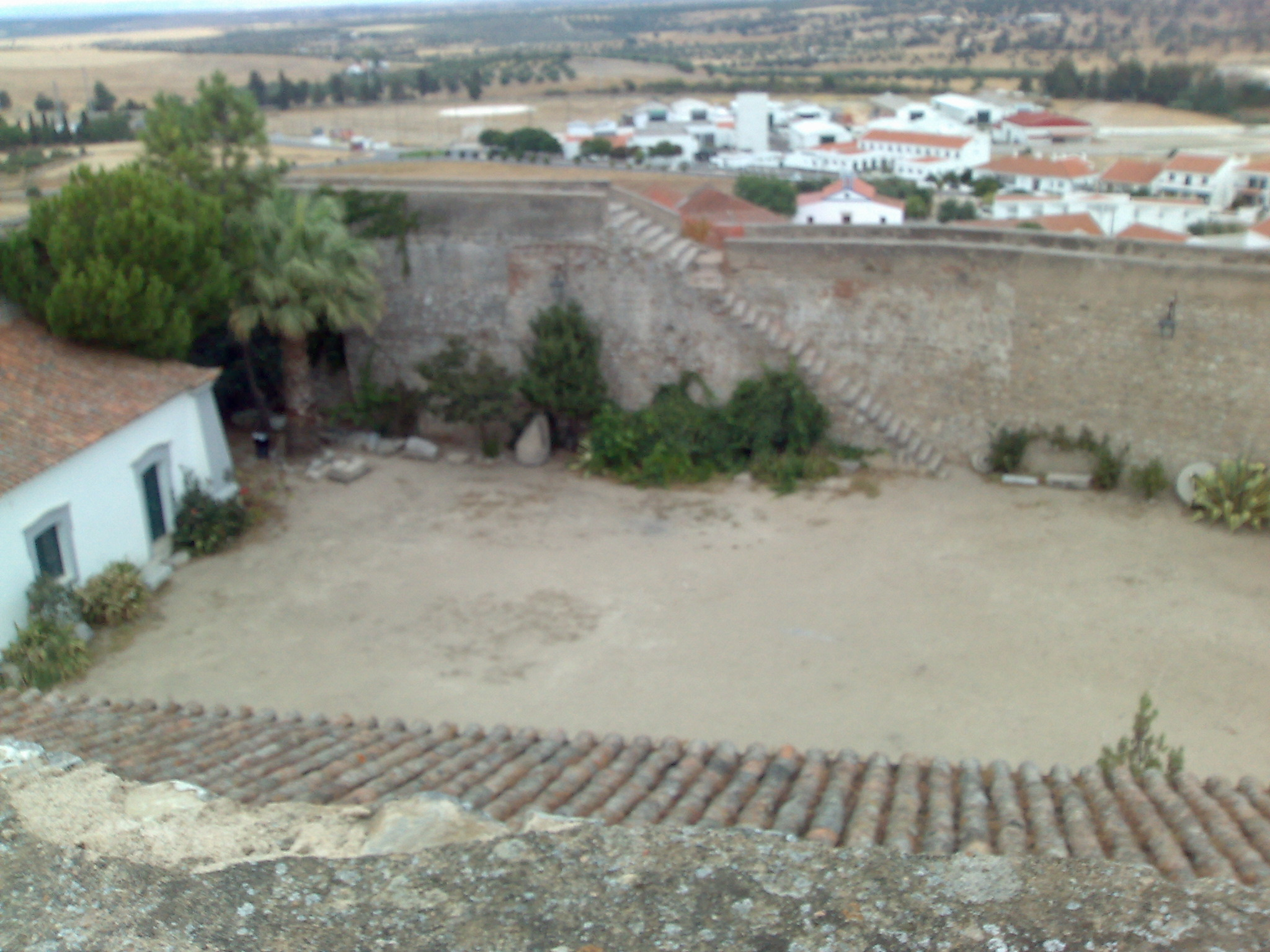
Castle of Serpa: interior.

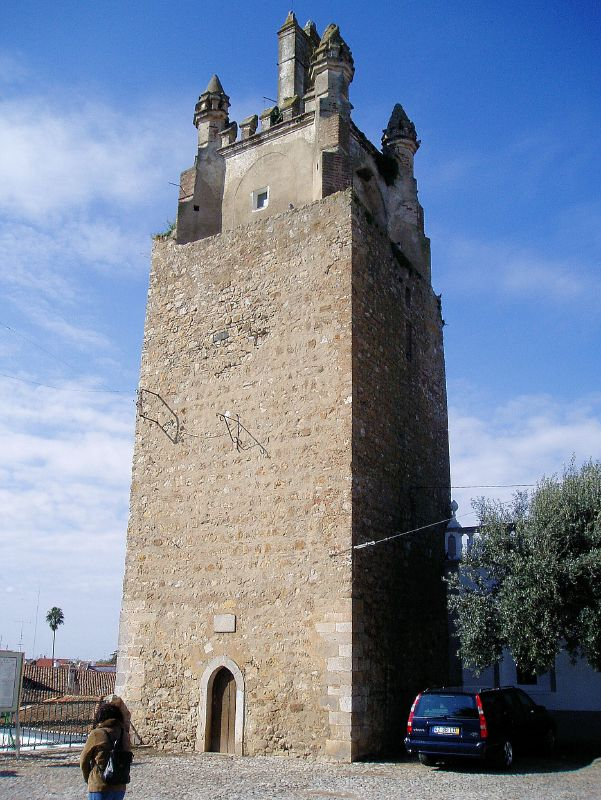
Castle of Serpa: tower

The Castle of Serpa (Portuguese: Castelo de Serpa) is a medieval castle located in the civil parish of Serpa (Salvador e Santa Maria), in the municipality of Serpa, Portuguese district of Beja.

== History ==
=== Early history ===
Archeological evidence shows that prehistoric humans occupied the region. The Romans later occupied the Iberian Peninsula. The moors later passed by the region.

=== Medieval era ===
During the midst of the Christian reconquest of the Iberian Peninsula, the town and its castle were conquered by troops under the command of the first Portuguese King Afonso I (1112-1185).

The village was returned to Muslim possession and renamed Scheberim when the major offensive of Almohad Abu Yusuf Yaqub al-Mansur retook a lot of land and reached the river Tagus in 1191. Later, the forces of King Sancho II recover these lands, and Serpa returned to Portuguese hands in 1232 and its domain were delivered to Ferdinand, king's brother, for his care.

Two decades later, with Afonso III (1248-1279) completed the conquest of the Algarve, Alfonso X of the Kingdom of Castile challenged him for jurisdictional control of these areas. Serpa domain and lands beyond the Guadiana river also was part in this dispute and saw its transfer to the Spanish monarch in 1271. The dispute ended only in 1283 with the transfer of these to Queen Beatrix, the mother of king Dinis (1279-1325). With the rectification of the border, under the reign of this, the village received its Foral Charter in 1295, at which time the villagers started the reconstruction of the old Muslim fortress, taking advantage of part of the primitive mud walls. To this end, the Order of Avis made a donation of one third of the incomes of the churches of Moura and Serpa to "remake and grocery alcáceres of the said castles" (1320).

In the midst of the 1383-85 Portuguese succession crisis, the village and its castle sided by the Order of Avis, having served as a base for Portuguese troops in several incursions into Spanish territory.

In the Cortes of 1455, the Serpa inhabitants contended that the population decline had their roots in wars and pestilences. Afonso V (1438-1481) remedied the situation by granting to future residents the exemption privilege for full for twenty years from military or municipal services.

=== Post-middle ages ===
During the succession crisis of 1580, Serpa and its castle, weakly garrisoned, fell before the Spanish troops under the command of Sancho d'Avila in 1580. At the time of Restoration of Independence of Portugal, the village was the first to unfurl the banner of Portugal, the areas of the town and its castle were donated by John IV (1640-1656) to Prince Pedro (1641), incorporating to the house of Infantado. Setting up the War of Restoration, like other places in the border region, also suffered this modernization work, with project in charge of Nicholas Langres architect, but were not completed. The projected bastion fortress that should defend the village was only partially executed, materialized in Forte de São Pedro de Serpa, which was completed in 1668.

=== Gradual decline ===
The castle was abandoned second half of the 17th century. It was neglected and maintenance did not keep up with its disrepair. The forces of nature slowly took its toll on the castle.

Occupied during the War of Spanish Succession, the castle suffered a huge blow when the powder magazine exploded, destroying one of the towers, following the withdrawal of the Spanish forces under the Duke of Ossuna command (1707).

Ruined by time, 1870 records show large landslides in the masonry of walls and towers.

=== 20th century to modern era ===
In 1958, the government of Portugal began on aqueduct section of the consolidation work with the Beja Gate. Later, in 1973 real estate for demolition and clearing of new sections of the walls were purchased and were proceeded the rebuilding of the existing section the street from balconies, which continued the following year with the consolidation of sections near the Porta de Moura and plaster the Clock Tower. New repair campaign in the walls of the section of street Balconies took place in 1977 that continued into 1980s with interventions in the castle area from 1980 1981-1982, 1983-1984, 1985-1986 to 1988.

In the mid-twentieth century, the Government of Portugal declared the Serpa walls to be classified a National Monument by a decree published on 30 January 1954.

In 2000, due to the strong storms in the region, a section of the wall suffered damage.

== Characteristics ==
The castle stands in the historic center of town and 230 meters above the sea level. The site plan reveals a citadel of quadrangular shape.

A search of the villa features oval, reinforced by turrets and square towers and semicircular topped by battlements binoculars. Originally three monument gates stood: Porta de Moura to the northeast, Porta de Beja to the northwest and the Port of Seville in the south, the latter now defunct). They are flanked by two cylindrical towers chamfered, such as blackbirds completion pentagonal. The cloth is west of the walls topped by an aqueduct built on arches go round, joining the Palace of the Counts of Ficalho, on the north side and a giant daughter seated in a pit, along the southeast corner, built in the seventeenth century to supply the palace. In later period opened the door to the Corredoura and New Gate.

The wall of the fortress is reinforced by the Homage Tower, quadrangular, adjoining south cloth, left to bottom; by a semicircular turret on the same side and a rectangular tower in the southeast corner, next to which is still visible part of the Barbican involved. There is installed the Archaeological Museum Serpa, exposing the evidence recovered in County region, the Paleolithic, Neolithic, of the Metal Age and Roman times.

In the square border to the Church of Santa Maria (old Muslim Mosque) stands the so-called Clock Tower, quadrangular, where stands the bell with conical shot of pinnacles surrounded by merlons bevelled. Vestige of the village fence, was transformed into a clock in 1440, becoming the third watchmaking tower oldest in the country. Inserted in the cloth of the walls is part of the Counts of Palace Ficalho in Mannerist style, initiated by Francisco de Melo, Captain-General of Serpa in the late sixteenth century and continued by his sons, Pedro de Melo, governor Captaincy of Rio de Janeiro (1662-1666), and Anthony D. Martim de Melo, bishop of Guarda.
