= Castle of Arronches =

Medieval castle in Portalegre, Portugal

- Castelo de Arronches
- Portalegre, Alto Alentejo, Alentejo in Portugal
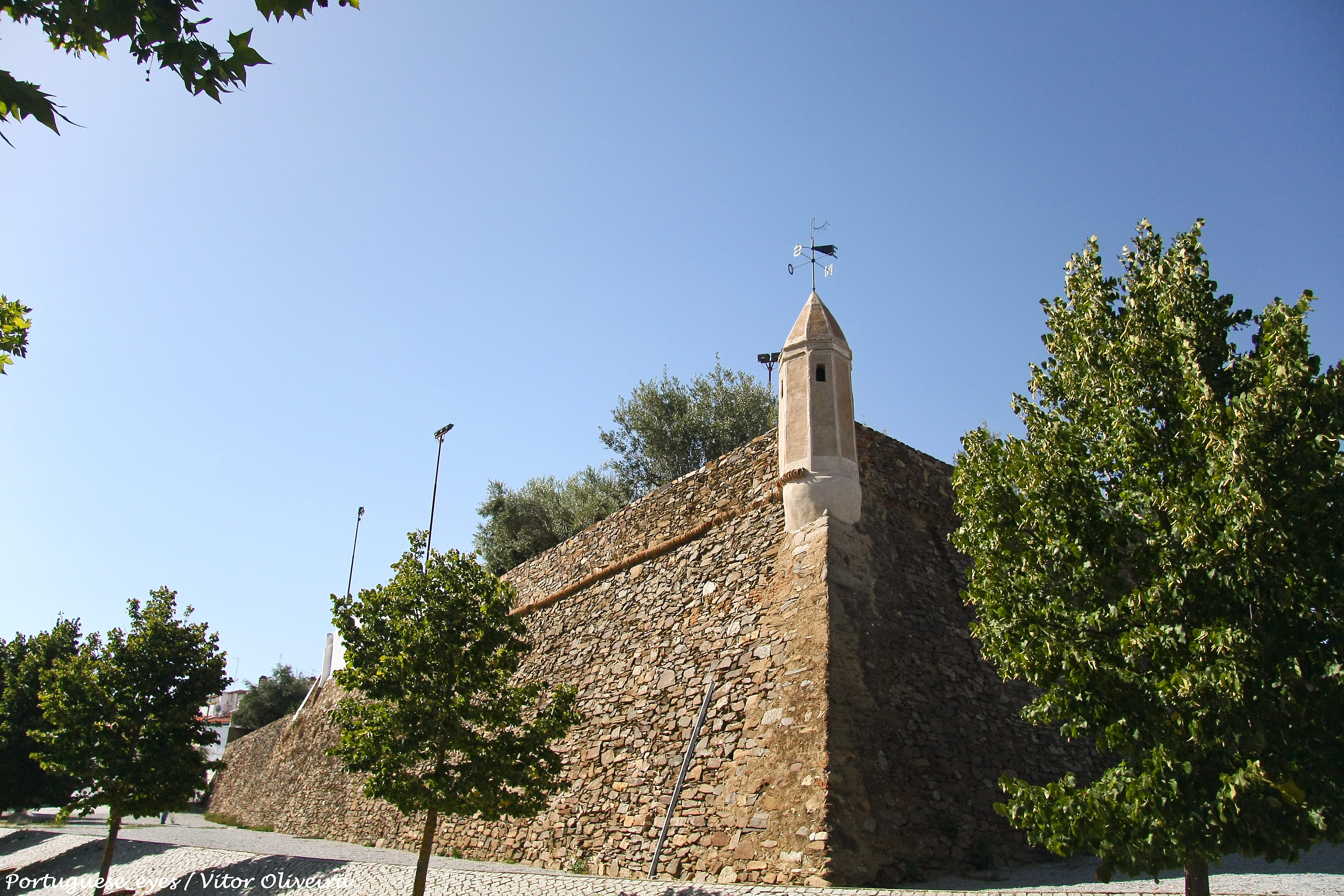

Site information
- Type: Castle
- Owner: Portuguese Republic
- Operator: Câmara Municipal de Arronches
- Open to the public: Public

Location
- Coordinates: 39°7′25″N 7°16′59″W

Site history
- Built: 1166
- Materials: Stone, Limestone, Sand, Tiles

The Castle of Arronches (Portuguese: Castelo de Arronches), is a Portuguese medieval castle in civil parish of Assunção, in the municipality of Arronches, in the district of Portalegre.

== History ==
In Arabic Muslim sources, the castle and its surroundings was known as أطرنكشً - as how the Moroccan chronicler Ibn Abi Zar’ has recorded it down.

The territory of Arronches was first conquered in 1166 by forces loyal to D. Afonso Henriques. Yet, over the course of the intervening years the location alternated between Muslim and Christian forces, with King D. Sancho II taking it in 1235, and in 1242, troops of D. Paio Peres Correia finally reconquered Arronches.

On 16 June 1255, a foral (charter) was issued by King D. Afonso III, which was confirmed on 2 January 1272.

In 1310, the lands of Arronches was incorporated into Crown territories by King D. Dinis, who ordered the reconstruction of the castle.

Following the Castilian invasion, in 1384, troops of D. Nuno Álvares Pereira retook the castle and lands of Arronches.

The first Cortes of Arronches convened in 1475.

On 1 June 1512, a new foral was issued by King D. Manuel I.

King D. John III gave Arronches to the masters of the Bishopric of Portalegre in 1549.

During the sequence of Wars of Independence, in 1640, the castle was integrated into the primary lines of defensive of Portugal. Ultimately, in 1661 John of Austria conquered Arronches during the course of the Portuguese Restoration War, but, two years later, there was an explosion in the powder magazine which damaged castle. Within the year there was a move to dismantle the fortifications by the Spanish forces.

With the restoration, on 25 July 1678, King Afonso VI conceded a new foral.

In 1712, the castle resisted a Castilian attack.

Combat at Arronches occurred in 1801.

During the 20th century, there were several projects to shore-up and recuperate the walls and fortifications of the fortress, including: in 1975, work to consolidate the bastions and walls; between 1976 and 1977, the work on the walls between Largo Serpa Pinto and Rua João Morais; conservation of the walls along Porta do Rio; and work between 1978 and 1979, on the merlon in ruin; as well as conversation in 1981, 1983 and 1987.

== Architecture ==
The fortification's bulwarks extend around the entire village. In the northeast, only the remains of the tower and corbel, that is addorsed to the primitive military installations. This area is encircled by the castle bulwark, and radiates from this to include: walls and moats of the Bulwark of the Elvas Gate, with prismatic corbel and pyramidal cap; the Bulwark of Santo António and Bulwark of Espírito Santo, with similar corbels, along a wall that is interrupted by the Rio Gate and remains of the Bulwark of Clérgios, the medieval wall and modern remains of the Bulwark of Nossa Senhora da Luz.
