= Castle of Montalvão =

Castle in Portalegre District, Portugal

- Castelo de Montalvão
- Portalegre, Alto Alentejo, Alentejo in Portugal
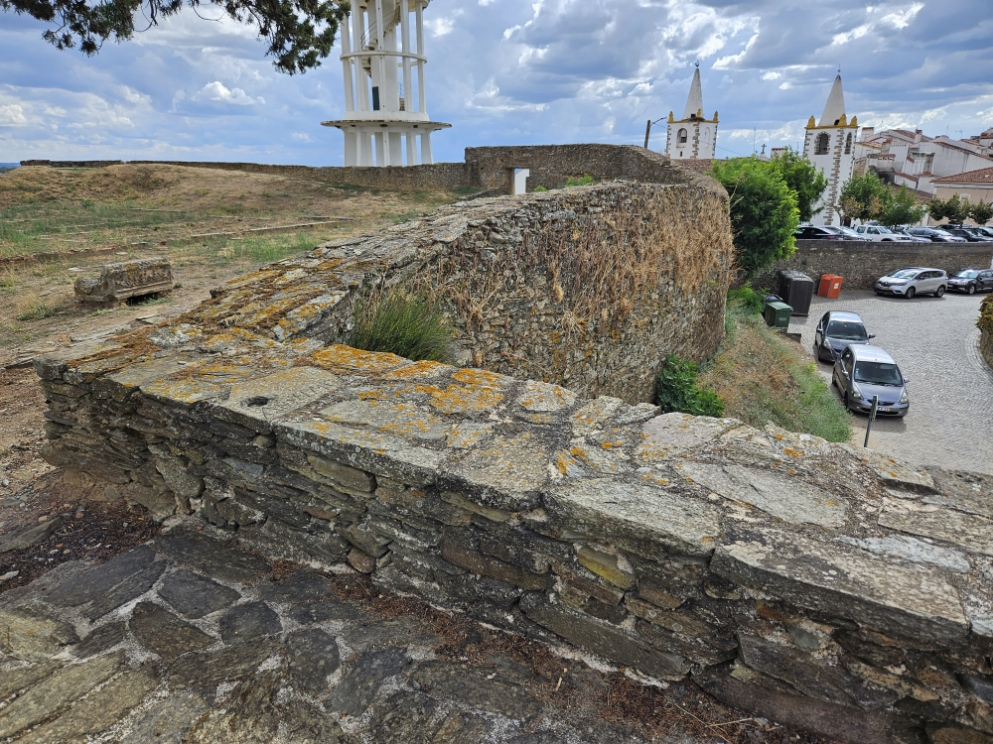

Site information
- Type: Castle
- Owner: Portuguese Republic
- Open to the public: Public

Location
- Coordinates: 39°35′44.63″N 7°31′34.69″W

Site history
- Built: 12th century

The Castle of Montalvão (Portuguese: Castelo de Montalvão) is a medieval castle in the civil parish of Montalvão, municipality of Nisa, in the Portuguese district of Portalegre.

== History ==
Montalvão was an important settlement in the Alto Alentejo during the first years of the Portuguese monarchy. The need to protect its frontier required that a populational presence was needed to mark the territory, and project a Christian control of the region. The locale, therefore, was under the control of the Command of the Order of Christ, and which originated the castle.

Its construction occurred during the reign of King D. Dinis, but there is evidence that the zone may have had a human presence prior to its formal occupation. The early medieval fortress was not likely a large project, but a simple plan of necessity carried out during the 16th century.

In the 12th century, there already existed defensive structures, which were part of the famous Tagus Line of defenses.

Between 1279 and 1325, the castle was constructed or reconstructed, during the reign of King D. Dinis.

Around 1509, Duarte d' Armas sketched the layout of the fortification, highlighting a long curtain of walls, without any tower, and accessible by a single gate.

On 22 November 1512, a foral (charter) was issued by King D. Manuel I.

During the 17th century, the main accessway was reconstructed, and in 1640, during the sequence of the Independence War, the castle fell along the main defensive line. It obtained its classical look, with rectangular lintel between pilasters supporting an architrave.

In 1834, the municipality of Montalvão was extinguished.

On 1 June 2012, the fortification was included in its respective Special Protection Zone (in announcement 12 203/2012, Diário da República, Série II, 107), classifying the structure as a Monumento de Interesse Público (Monument of Public Interest).

== Architecture ==
The castle is situated in an isolated urban area, on top of a hill, near the Church of Montalvão.

Its enclosure is dominated by an enormous concrete tower/bunker used for the collection of water. There are vestiges of the wall foundations, towers and cisterns of the medieval castle, survived by some walls, composed of shale. The interior of the fortification is marked by a rectangular, sepulchral ark of stone with one of the faces sculpted with vegetal elements and the cross of Christ in its centre.
