= Castle of Monforte (Chaves) =

Castle in Vila Real District, Portugal

- Castelo de Monforte
- Santo António de Monforte, Chaves; Near Chaves, Vila Real District in Portugal
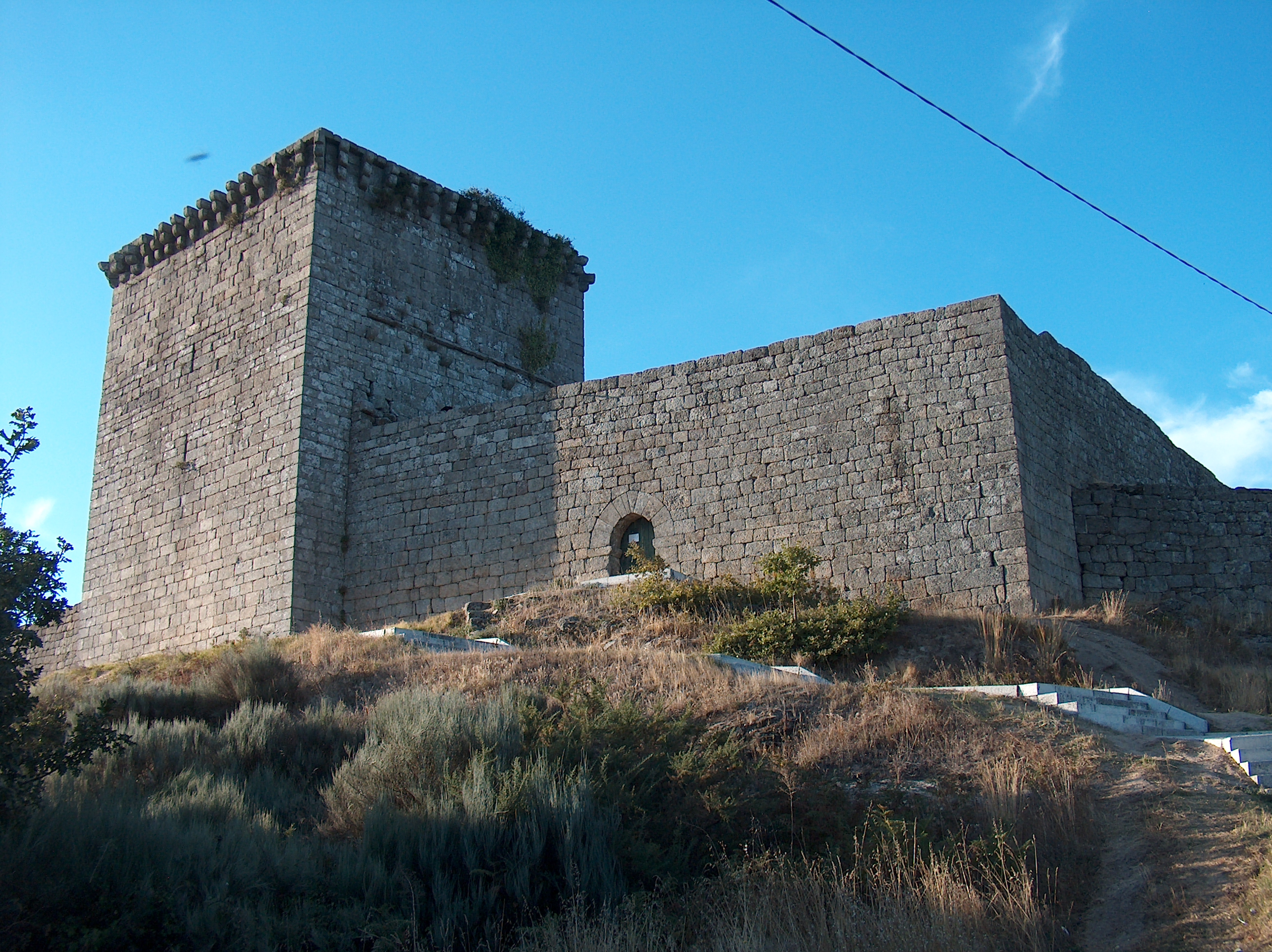
- Tower overlooking it

Site information
- Type: Castle (Castelo)
- Owner: Portuguese Republic
- Open to the public: 10:00 a.m.–6:30 p.m. May–September

Location
- Coordinates: 41°45′44.13″N 7°21′21.98″W

Site history
- Materials: Pedra Lioz (Limestone)
- Events: 1278 (Origin); 1300 (Foral Charter); 1601 (Initiated)

Garrison information
- Designations: National Monument; Monumento Nacional
- Management: Direção-Geral do Património Cultural
- Listing: Decree 37/728; DG, Série I, 228 (5 January 1950)

Airfield information
- Elevation: 110 m (360 ft) AMSL

The Castle of Monforte (Portuguese: Castelo de Monforte), also referred to as Castelo de Monforte de Rio Livre, is a medieval castle located in the Águas Frias parish, Monforte de village, Chaves municipality in Vila Real district of Portugal.

== History ==
=== Early history ===
Archaeological evidence indicates that the early human occupation of its site dates back to Neolithic Times. When the Roman conducted their invasion of the Iberian Peninsula, the region was occupied due to the proximity of the settlement with Roman road that linked Astorga to Braga.

=== Medieval Era ===
In 1273, the town received a Foral charter from King Afonso III (1248-1279).

The town received a confirmation Foral Charter from King Afonso IV.

During the 1383-1385 Portuguese succession crisis, the village and castle sided with Beatriz, but she was defeated and the village was forced to accept John I (1385-1433). It is believed that during this time, the castle was constructed and later the castle site plan was recorded in the Duarte de Armas (Book of Fortresses c. 1509).

=== Post Middle Ages ===
In Portuguese Restoration War for Independence, the Council of War John IV (1640-1656) determined the modernization of defenses Monforte was necessary by adapting them to fire artillery. Thus, they were erected a half-bastion and other structures in the east of the medieval Donjon tower.

=== 20th Century to modern day ===
By the 20th century, the quality of the castle had slowly declined. The village has been abandoned.

The Portuguese government subsequently declared the castle of Monforte to be a National Monument on 5 January 1950.

Currently, the area surrounding the castle hosts every summer, a busy recreation of medieval fair with costumes, games and time items.

== Architecture ==
The medieval castle is constructed walls of granite, which is abundantly found in the region. They stand in fair condition. The castle is accessible by two doors:

- the Village Gate,
  - It stands in the West. it is wider and provides easy access to the village
- Port of Betrayal, the South in round arch
  - It is in the South and is much narrower.

The top of the walls is covered by a battlement that can only be accessed through a door from inside the Keep. This presents quadrangular, crowned by a row of tripartite corbels and is divided internally into three floors, illuminated by torn cracks in the walls.

The former about the village where originally tore three gates, there remains only the call Galeao door.
