= Castle of Monforte (Monforte) =

Castle in Portalegre District, Portugal

- Castelo de Monforte
- Monforte, Alto Alentejo, Alentejo in Portugal
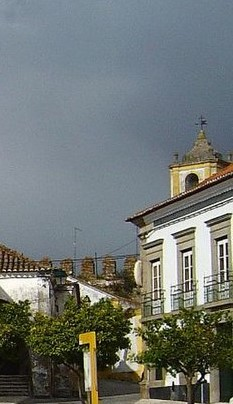

Site information
- Type: Castle
- Owner: Portuguese Republic

Location
- Coordinates: 39.054522°N 7.438977°W

Site history
- Materials: Granite, Wood, Cement, Tile

The Castle of Monforte (Portuguese: Castelo de Monforte) is a medieval castle located in the civil parish of Monforte, in the municipality of Monforte, Portuguese district of Portalegre.

== History ==
In 1139, the settlement was conquered from the Moors by D. Afonso Henriques. Several years later, a letter detailing the privileges conceded by D. Afonso Henriques was issued in 1168, but it fell into the hands of the Moors from the Castro of Ayamonte (the hilltop of Vaiamonte). After being retaken, a foral (charter) was issued in 1257, by King D. Afonso III.

It was King D. Dinis who ordered the construction of new fortress, over the ruins of the old castro. The buildings included four towers, that included a keep tower, a new circuit of walls and reinforced by square. In 1358 several powers were conceded to the villagers. Between 1383 and 1385, the town was occupied by Martim Anes Barbuda, then in refuge from the Battle of Atoleiros, remaining under his domain for the following years. Between 1391 and 1395, King D. John I donated the town to the Condestável D. Nuno Álvares Pereira.

In 1512, a new foral was issued by King D. Manuel I. In 1542, Monforte began to be a possession of the House of Braganza, under the donation of D. Isabel, wife of Duke D. Teodósio I.

Between 1640 and 1668, reinforced the walls damaged during the Restoration Wars, owing to its important strategic position on the hilltop of Monforte. During the 17th century, in the reign of King D. John IV, the four bastions of the castle were constructed. On 28 June 1662, Don John of Austria, conquered the village of Monforte. But, taking advantage of the withdrawal of Spanish troops to Badajoz, the town was retaken on 11 July 1662. During the War of Spanish Succession, the square suffered various attacks from the Spanish army.

In 1801, the castle was attacked by Spanish forces, resulting in the destruction of the primitive castle. Only a few of the walls and the keep tower survived the incursion.

On 9 September 1887, António Sardinha, the great poet and doctrinaire politician grande was born in the villa, going on to be a founder of the publication Integracionismo Lusitano. On 26 September 1895, the municipality of Monforte was extinguished for the next three years, becoming subsumed into the municipality of Arronches. When it was restore (on 13 January 1898), the municipality began to integrate Monforte, Assumar, Santo Aleixo, Vaiamonte and Prazeres.

The first attempt at restoring the old castle began in 2005, with a general plan that include the division of the walls into project zones.

== Architecture ==
The Dionisic castle has four towers, that included the keep and clock towers, four bastions, a cistern, lines of walls marked by gates, most of which are in ruin. Along with the castles of Veiros, Campo Maior and Ouguela, Monforte was a defensive line in the region, used to impede Spanish invasion from the east in addition to playing a strategic point in the Christian Reconquista.
