= List of castles in Portugal =

This page is a list of castles and fortified keeps in Portugal, arranged by region (NUTSII Regions and NUTSIII Subregions):

== Norte ==
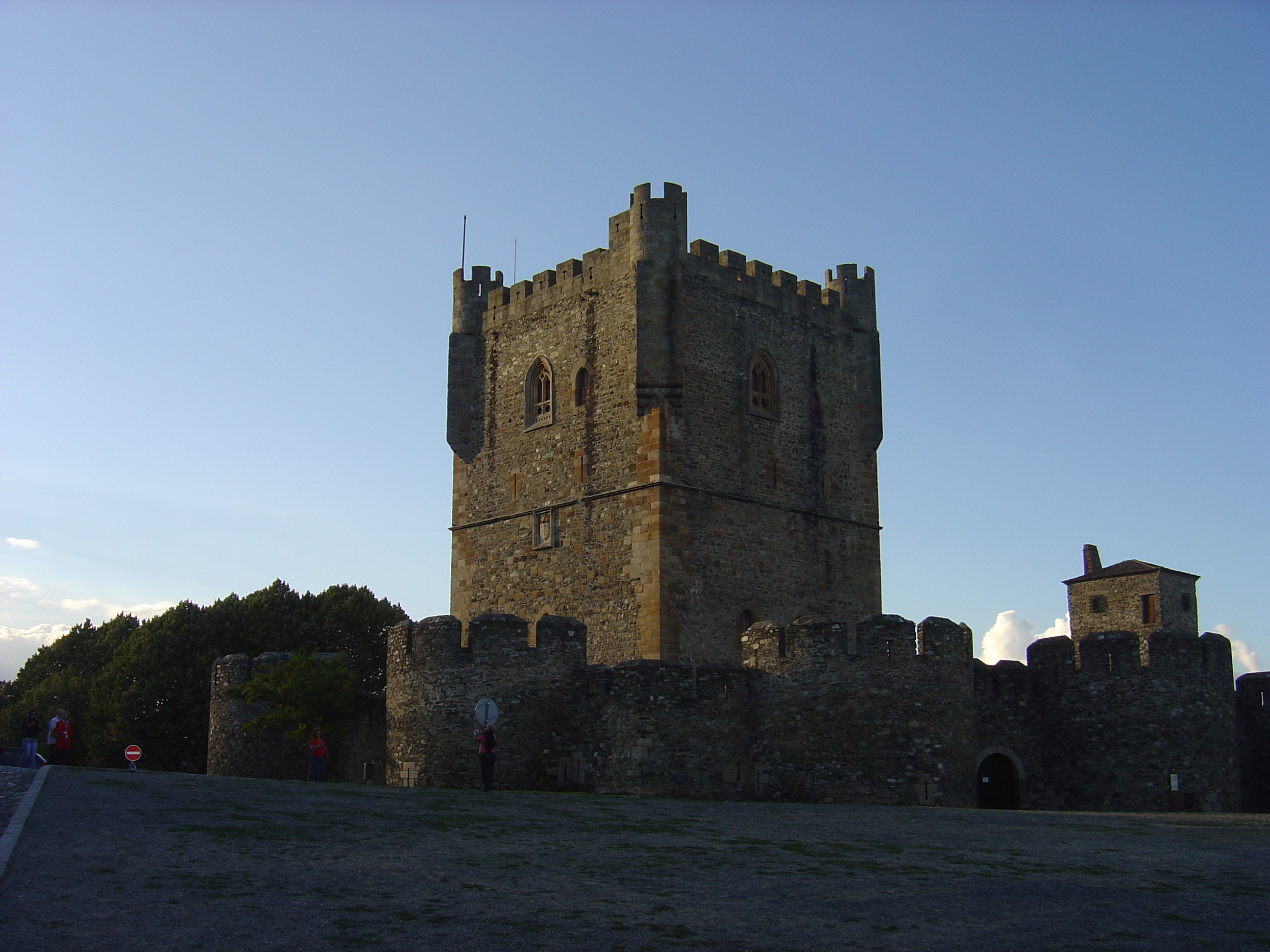
The main keep of the Castle of Bragança

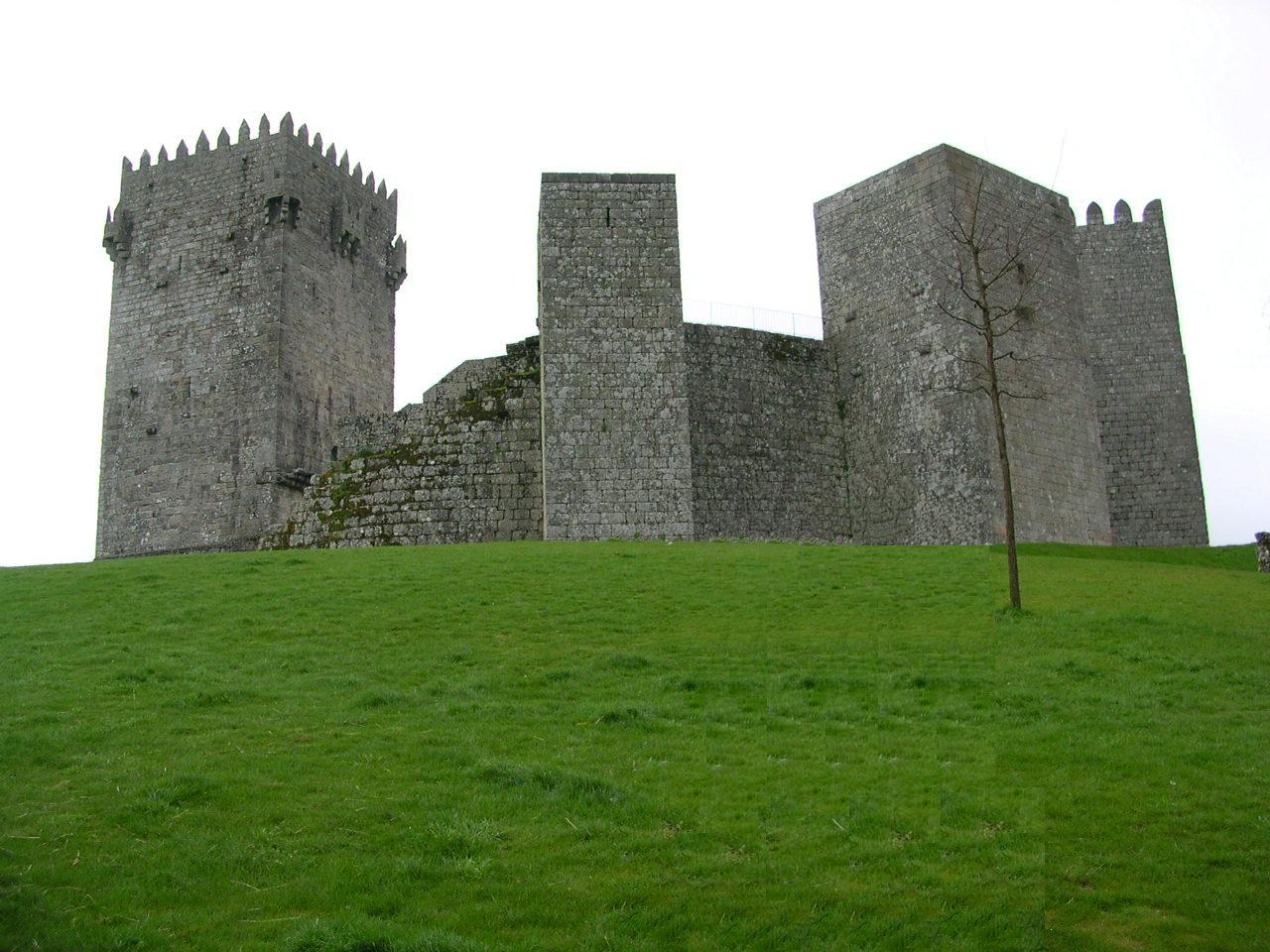
The Castle of Montalegre as seen from below the hill

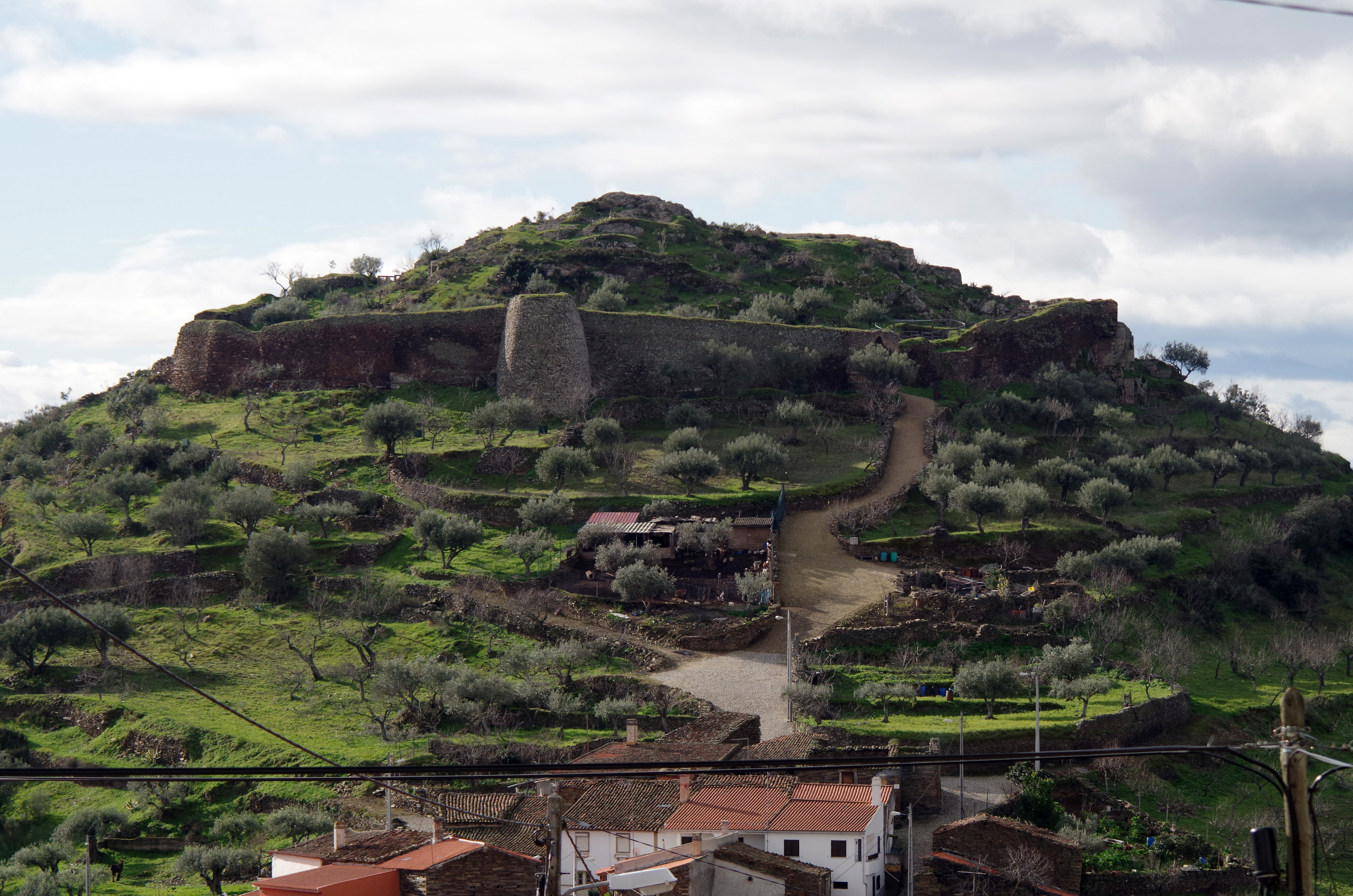
A view of the castle of Castelo Melhor encircling the hilltop

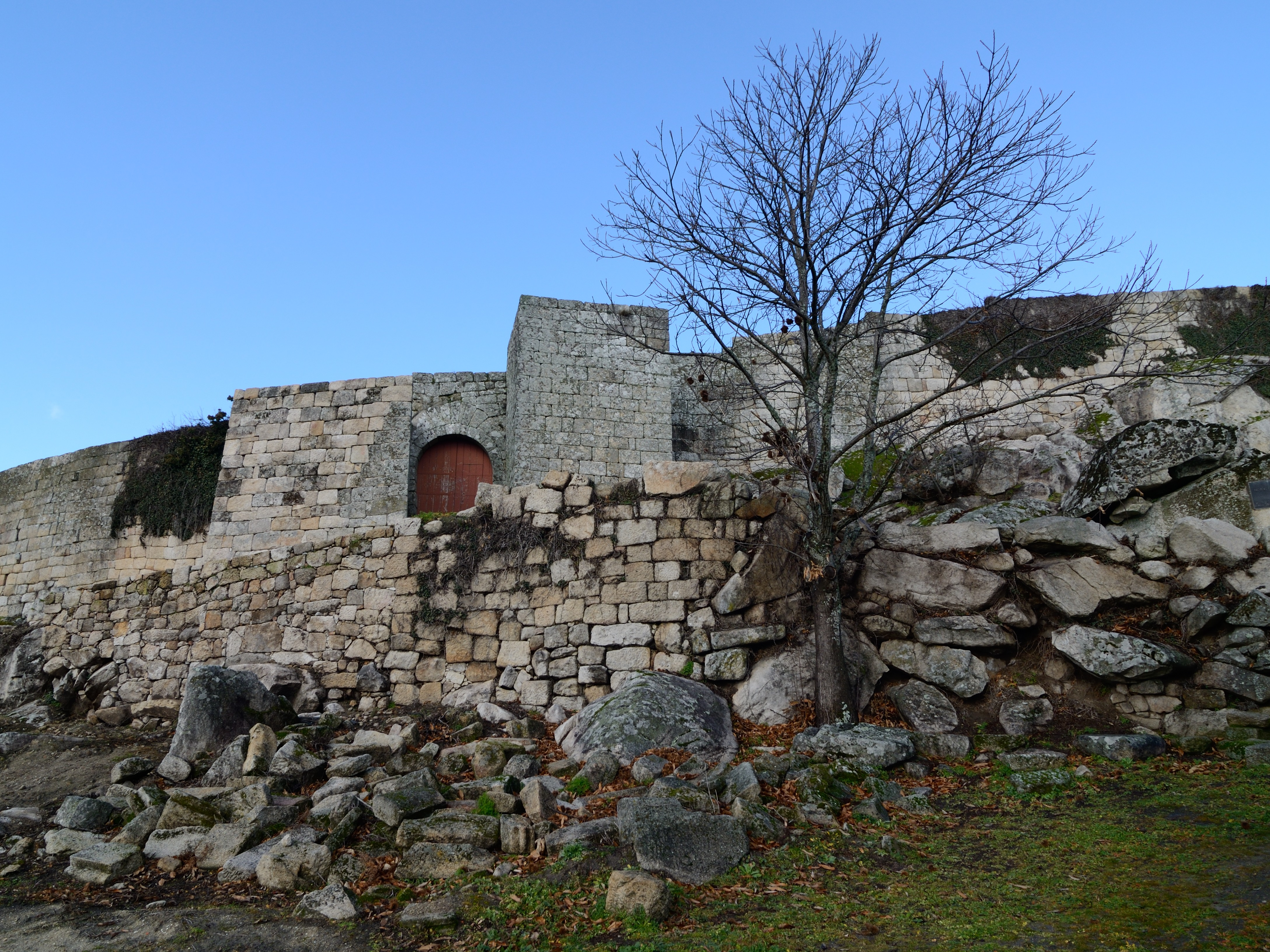
The rubble and walls of the Castle of Carrazeda de Ansiães

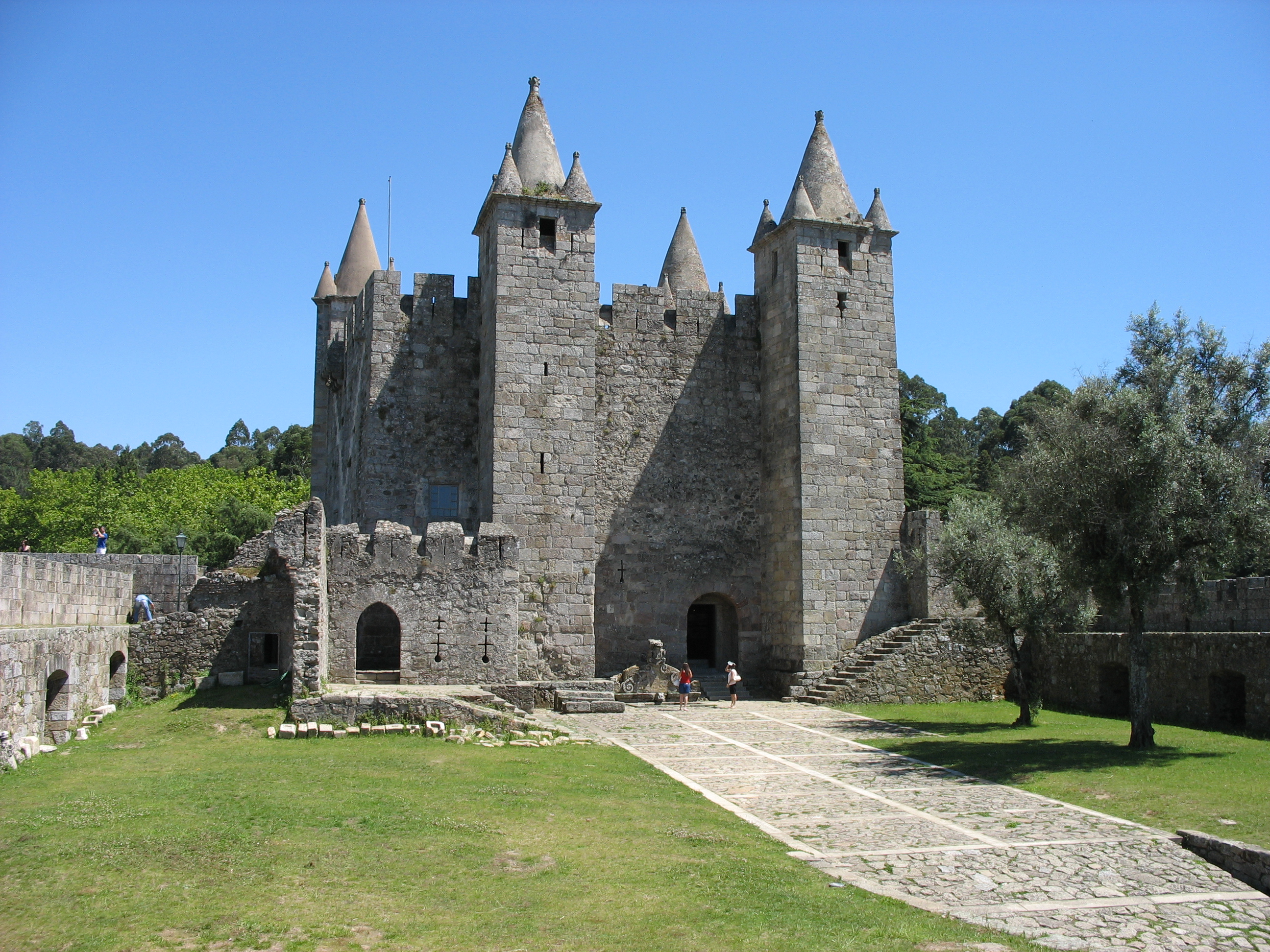
The church-like towers of the Castle of Santa Maria da Feira

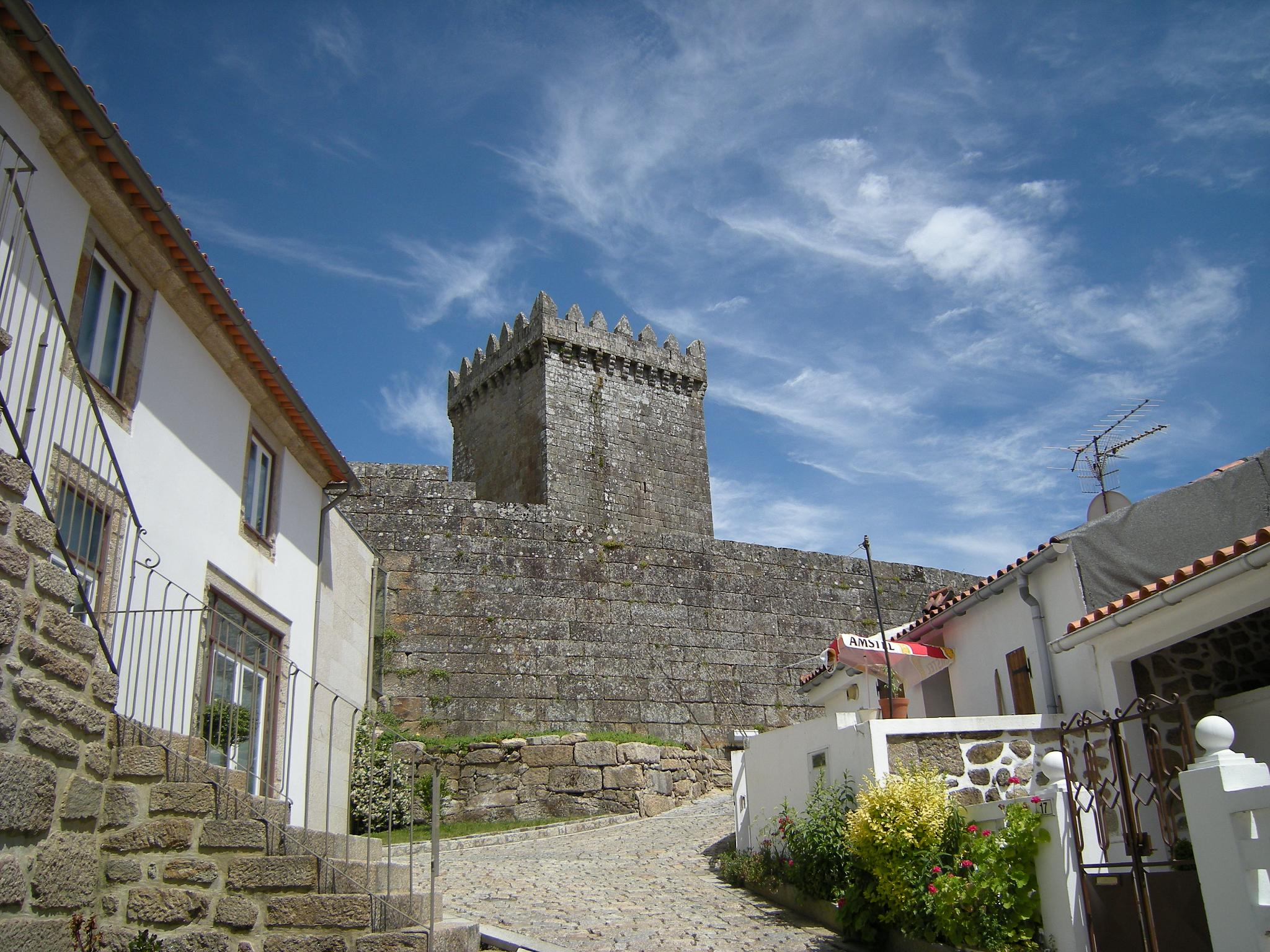
A view of the "tower of menagem" (the keep tower) of Melgaço

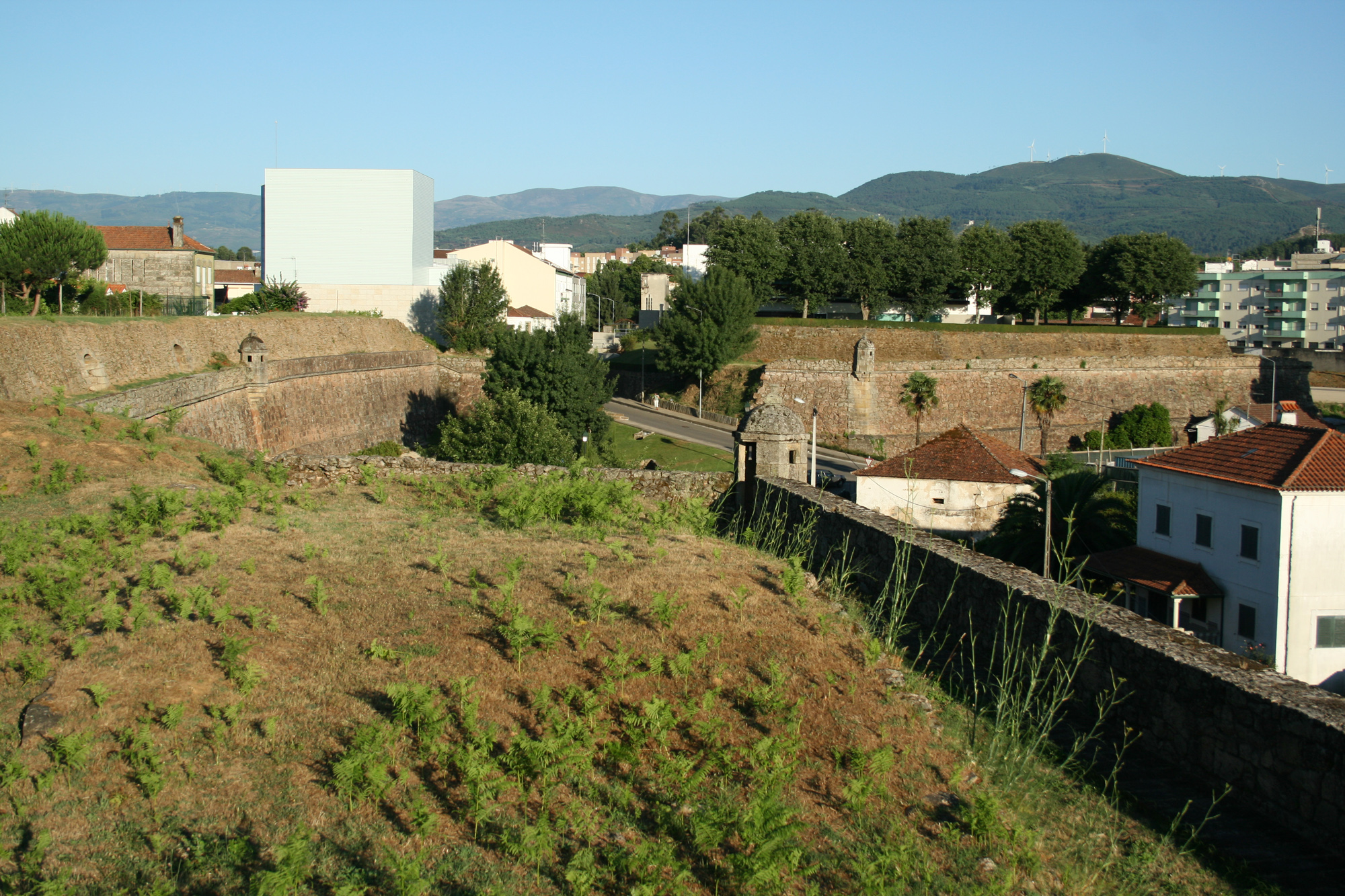
Remains of the walls of the Castle of Monção

=== Alto Trás-os-Montes ===
- Beacon of Parada (Parada e Sendim da Ribeira, Alfândega da Fé)
- Castle of Alfândega da Fé (Alfândega da Fé, Alfândega da Fé)
- Castle of Algoso (Algoso, Campo de Víboras e Uva, Vimioso)
- Castle of Balsamão (Chacim, Macedo de Cavaleiros)
- Castle of Bemposta (Bemposta, Mogadouro)
- Castle of Bragança (Sé, Santa Maria e Meixedo, Bragança)
- Castle of Chaves (Santa Maria Maior, Chaves)
- Castle of Ervededo (Ervededo, Chaves)
- Castle of Mau Vizinho (Cimo de Vila da Castanheira, Chaves)
- Castle of Miranda do Douro (Miranda do Douro, Miranda do Douro)
- Castle of Mirandela (Mirandela, Mirandela)
- Castle of Mogadouro (Mogadouro, Valverde, Vale de Porco e Vilar de Rei, Mogadouro)
- Castle of Monforte de Rio Livre (Águas Frias, Chaves)
- Castle of Montalegre (Meixedo e Padornelos, Montalegre)
- Castle of Pena de Aguiar (Telões, Vila Pouca de Aguiar)
- Castle of Penas Róias (Penas Róias, Mogadouro)
- Castle of Rebordãos (Rebordãos, Bragança)
- Castle of Santo Estêvão (Santo Estêvão, Chaves)
- Castle of São Ramão (Viade de Baixo e Fervidelas, Montalegre)
- Castle of Vinhais (Vinhais, Vinhais)
- Fort de Modorra (Vale Verde, Vinhais)
- Fortress of Outeiro (Outeiro, Bragança)
- Watchtower of Alto do Facho (Duas Igrejas, Miranda do Douro)
- Watchtower of Alto do Pendão (Genísio, Miranda do Douro)
- Watchtower of Atalaia (Peredo da Bemposta, Mogadouro)
- Watchtower of Atalaia (Vimioso, Vimioso)
- Watchtower of Belage (Vila Chã de Braciosa, Miranda do Douro)
- Watchtower of Candaira (Baçal, Bragança)
- Watchtower of Escula (Picote, Miranda do Douro)
- Watchtower of Facho (Malhadas, Miranda do Douro)
- Watchtower of Facho (Brunhozinho, Castanheira e Sanhoane, Mogadouro)
- Watchtower of Facho Segundo (Peredo da Bemposta, Mogadouro)
- Watchtower of Inculas (Cerejais, Alfândega de Fé)
- Watchtower of Pendão (Póvoa, Miranda do Douro)
- Watchtower of Pendão (Azinhoso, Mogadouro)
- Watchtower of Pendão (Castelo Branco, Mogadouro)
- Watchtower of Pendão (São Martinho do Peso, Mogadouro)
- Watchtower of Vigia (São Martinho de Angueira, Miranda do Douro)

=== Ave ===
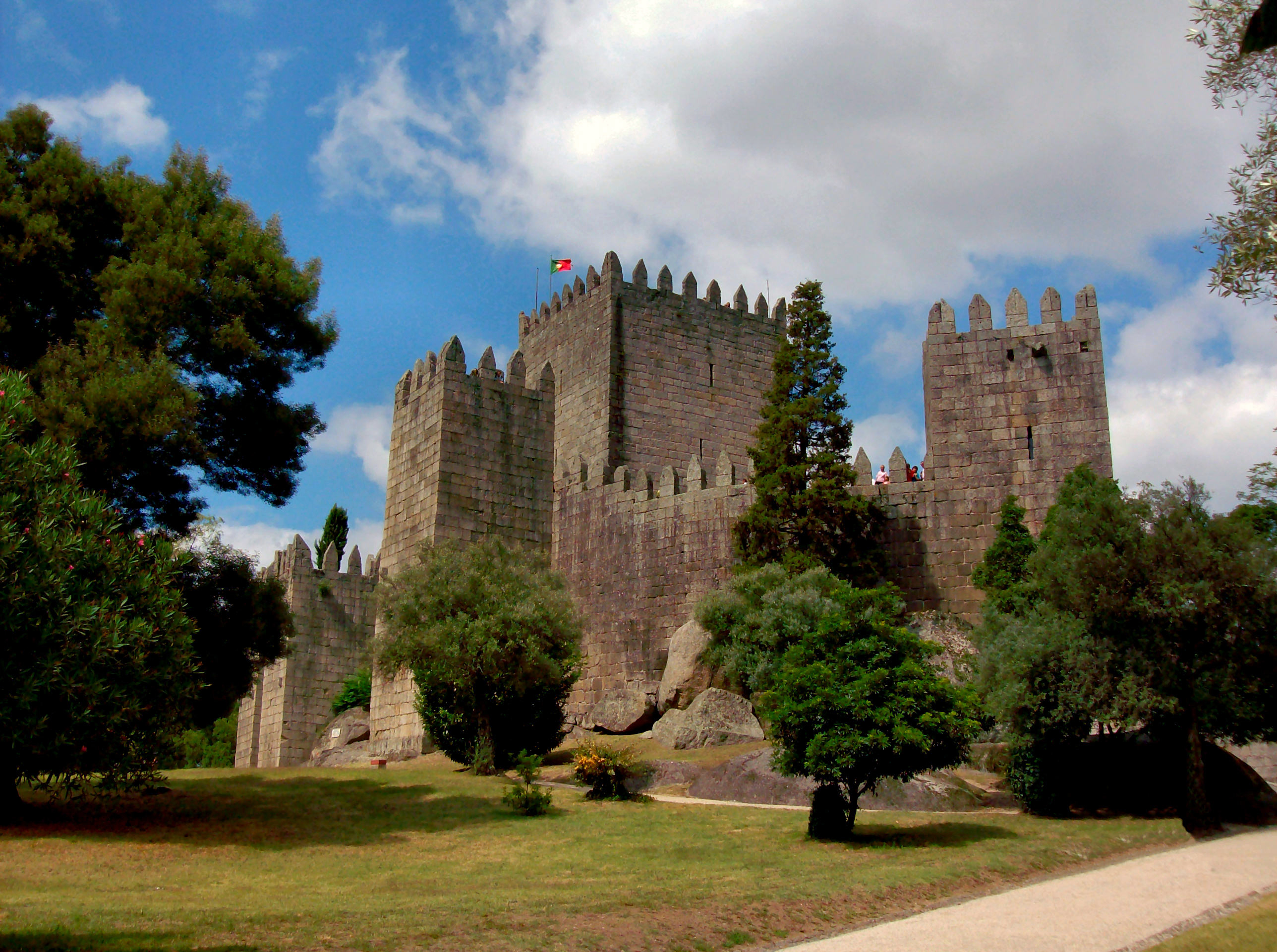
Guimarães Castle, known as The Cradle of Portugal.

- Castle of Lanhoso (Póvoa de Lanhoso (Nossa Senhora do Amparo), Póvoa de Lanhoso)
- Castle of Guimarães (Oliveira, São Paio e São Sebastião, Guimarães)

=== Cávado ===
- Castle of Bastuço (Sequeade e Bastuço (São João e Santo Estêvão), Barcelos)
- Castle of Braga (Braga (São José de São Lázaro e São João do Souto), Braga)
- Castle of Faria (Gilmonde, Barcelos)
- Tower of Barcelos (Barcelos, Vila Boa e Vila Frescainha (São Martinho e São Pedro), Barcelos)

=== Douro ===
- Castle of Alva (Poiares, Freixo de Espada à Cinta)
- Castle of Cabris (Sendim, Tabuaço)
- Castle of Carrazeda de Ansiães (Lavandeira, Beira Grande e Selores, Carrazeda de Ansiães)
- Castle of Castelo Melhor (Castelo Melhor, Vila Nova de Foz Côa)
- Castle of Freixo de Espada-à-Cinta (Freixo de Espada à Cinta e Mazouco, Freixo de Espada-à-Cinta)
- Castle of Freixo de Numão (Freixo de Numão, Vila Nova de Foz Côa)
- Castle of Geraldo (Nossa Senhora da Tourega e Nossa Senhora de Guadalupe, Freixo de Espada à Cinta)
- Castle of Lamego (Lamego (Almacave e Sé), Lamego)
- Castle of Mós (Mós, Torre de Moncorvo)
- Castle of Numão (Numão, Vila Nova de Foz Côa)
- Castle of Penedono (Penedono e Granja, Penedono)
- Castle of Sernancelhe (Sernancelhe e Sarzeda, Sernancelhe)
- Castle of Torre de Moncorvo (Torre de Moncorvo, Torre de Moncorvo)
- Castle of Valença do Douro (Valença do Douro, Tabuaço)
- Castle of Vila Flor (Vila Flor e Nabo, Vila Flor)
- Castle of Vila Nova de Foz Côa (Vila Nova de Foz Côa, Vila Nova de Foz Côa)
- Watchtower of Alfarela (Torre de Moncorvo, Torre de Moncorvo)
- Watchtower of Atalaia (Almendra, Vila Nova de Foz Côa)
- Watchtower of Cabeço do Facho (Freixo de Espada à Cinta e Mazouco, Freixo de Espada à Cinta)
- Watchtower of Custóias (Custóias, Vila Nova de Foz Côa)
- Watchtower of Facho (Touça, Vila Nova de Foz Côa)
- Watchtower of Ferronho (Mós, Torre de Moncorvo)
- Watchtower of Lagoaça (Lagoaça e Fornos, Freixo de Espada à Cinta)
- Watchtower of Lugar do Fumo (Almendra, Vila Nova de Foz Côa)
- Watchtower of Pendão (Horta da Vilariço, Torre de Moncorvo)

=== Entre Douro e Vouga ===
- Castle of Santa Maria da Feira (Santa Maria da Feira, Travanca, Sanfins e Espargo, Santa Maria da Feira)

=== Porto ===
- Walls of D. Fernando/Fernandina Wall (Cedofeita, Santo Ildefonso, Sé, Miragaia, São Nicolau e Vitória, Porto)

=== Minho-Lima ===
- Castle of Castro Laboreiro (Castro Laboreiro e Lamas de Mouro, Melgaço)
- Castle of Curutelo (Ardegão, Freixo e Mato, Ponte de Lima)
- Castle of Lapela (Troporiz e Lapela, Monção)
- Castle of Lindoso (Lindoso, Ponte de Barca)
- Castle of Melgaço (Vila e Roussas, Melgaço)
- Castle of Monção (Monção e Troviscoso, Monção)
- Castle of Nóbrega (Sampriz, Ponte da Barca)
- Castle of Pena da Rainha (Abedim, Monção)
- Castle of Vila Nova de Cerveira (Vila Nova de Cerveira e Lovelhe, Vila Nova de Cerveira)
- Walls of Ponte de Lima (Arca e Ponte de Lima, Ponte de Lima)
- Watchtower of Mata (Vila Nova de Cerveira e Lovelhe, Vila Nova de Cerveira)

=== Tâmega ===
- Castle of Aguiar de Sousa (Aguiar de Sousa, Paredes)
- Castle of Penafiel (Oldrões, Penafiel)

== Centro ==
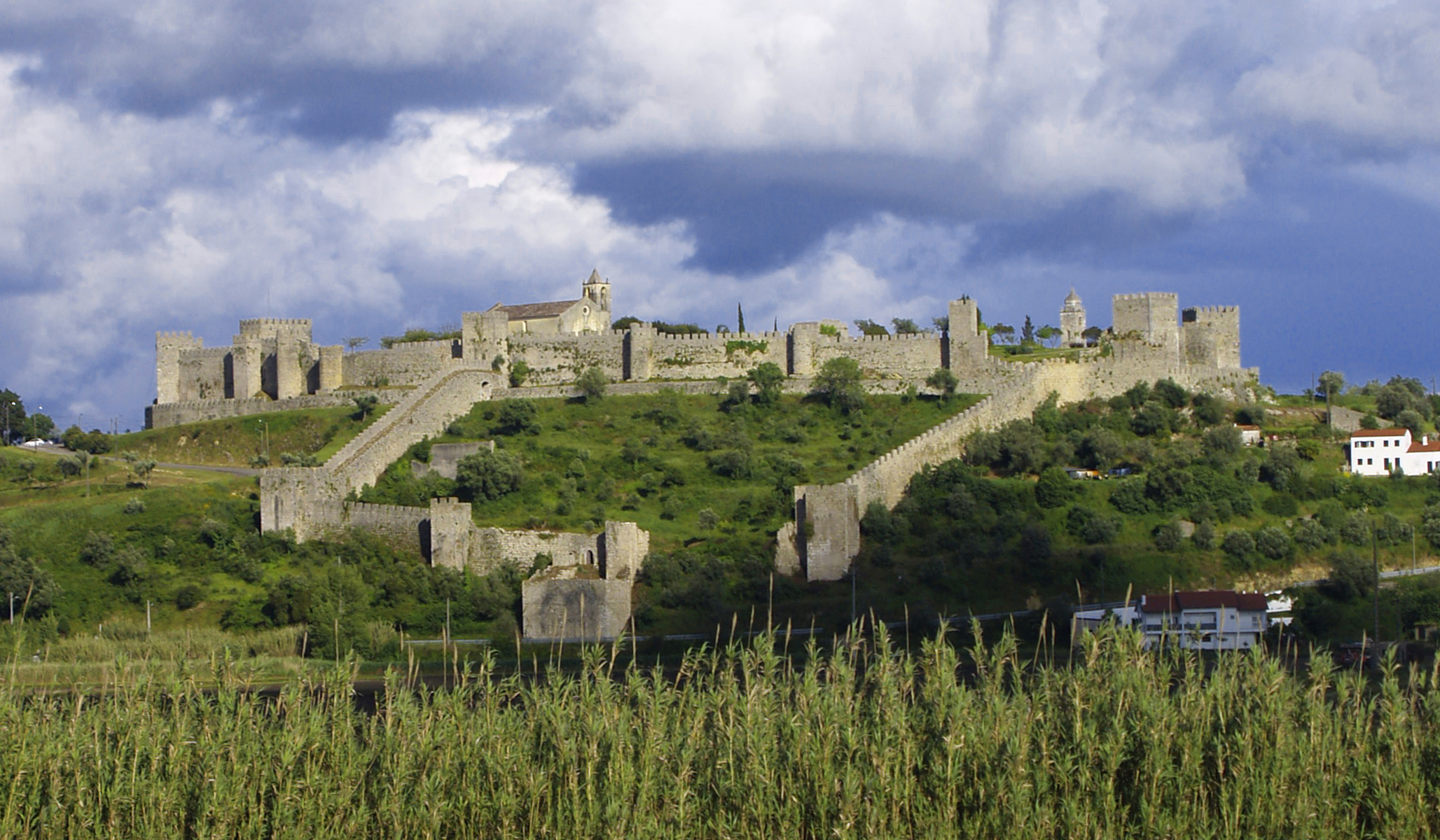
The Castle of Montemor-o-Velho stretching down the hilltop

=== Baixo Mondego ===
- Castle of Montemor-o-Velho (Montemor-o-Velho e Gatões, Montemor-o-Velho)
- Castle of Redondos (Buarcos, Figueira da Foz)
- Castle of Soure (Soure, Soure)
- Tower of Bera (Almalaguês, Coimbra)

=== Beira Interior Norte ===
- Castle of Aldeira Velha (Sul de Pinhel, Pinhel)
- Castle of Alfaiates (Alfaiates, Sabugal)
- Castle of Atalaia (Pinhel, Pinhel)
- Castle of Casteição (Prova e Casteição, Mêda)
- Castle of Castelo Bom (Castelo Bom, Almeida)
- Castle of Castelo Mendo (Castelo Mendo, Ade, Monteperobolso e Mesquitela, Almeida)
- Castle of Celorico da Beira (Celorico (São Pedro e Santa Maria) e Vila Boa do Mondego, Celorico da Beira)
- Castle of Codesseiro (Codesseiro, Guarda)
- Castle of Dalva (Escalhão, Figueira de Castelo Rodrigo)
- Castle of Guarda (Guarda, Guarda)
- Castle of Linhares (Linhares, Celorico da Beira)
- Castle of Longroiva (Longrovia, Mêda)
- Castle of Marialva (Marialva, Mêda)
- Castle of Monforte (Colmeal e Vilar Torpim, Figueira de Castelo Rodrigo)
- Castle of Moreira (Arnóia, Celorico de Basto)
- Castle of Moreira de Rei (Moreira de Rei, Trancoso)
- Castle of Pinhel (Pinhel, Pinhel)
- Castle of Ranhados (Ranhados, Mêda)
- Castle of Sabugal (Sabugal e Aldeia de Santo António, Sabugal)
- Castle of Sortelha (Sortelha, Sabugal)
- Castle of Trancoso (Trancoso (São Pedro e Santa Maria) e Souto Maior, Trancoso)
- Castle of Valhelhas (Valhelas, Guarda)
- Castle of Vila do Touro (Vila do Touro, Sabugal)
- Castle of Vilar Maior (Aldeia da Ribeira, Vilar Maior e Badamalos, Sabugal)
- Castle of Cristóvão de Moura (Castelo Rodrigo, Figueira de Castelo Rodrigo)
- Clocktower of Celorico da Beira (Celorico (São Pedro e Santa Maria) e Vila Boa do Mondego, Celorico da Beira)
- Tower of Sentinela (Escalhão, Figueira de Castelo Rodrigo)
- Watchtower and ruins of Algadores (Algodres, Vale de Alfonsinho e Vilar de Amargo, Figueira de Castelo Rodrigo)
- Watchtower of Aldeia da Ribeira (Aldeia da Ribeira, Vilar Maior e Badamalos, Sabugal)
- Watchtower of Almenara (Mata de Lobos, Figueira de Castelo Rodrigo)
- Watchtower of Alto do Barranco do Pendão (Miuzela e Porto de Ovelha, Almeida)
- Watchtower of Alto do Facho (Vermisoa, Figueira de Castelo Rodrigo)
- Watchtower of Atalaia (Malpartida e Vale de Coelha, Almeida)
- Watchtower of Atalaia (Vilar Formoso, Almeida)
- Watchtower of Atalaia II (Vilar Formoso, Almeida)
- Watchtower of Atalaias (Malpartida e Vale de Coelha, Almeida)
- Watchtower of Cabeço da Atalaia (Alto do Palurdo, Pinhel)
- Watchtower of Cabeço de Atalaia (Leomil, Mido, Senouras e Aldeia Nova, Almeida)
- Watchtower of Cabeço do Facho (Almofala e Escarigo, Figueira de Castelo Rodrigo)
- Watchtower of Castelo Bom (Castelo Bom, Almeida)
- Watchtower of Moitas (Aldeia da Ribeira, Vilar Maior e Badamalos, Sabugal)
- Watchtower of Pendão (Prova e Casteição, Mêda)
- Watchtower of Pendão (Vale do Massueime, Pinhel)
- Watchtower of Picão da Atalaia (Algodres, Vale de Alfonsinho e Vilar de Amargo, Figueira de Castelo Rodrigo)
- Watchtower of Póvoa de El-Rei (Vale do Massueime, Pinhel)
- Watchtower of Sentinela (Junça e Naves, Almeida)
- Watchtower of Sentinela (Vermisoa, Figueira de Castelo Rodrigo)
- Watchtower of Tinassa (Vale da Mula, Almeida)

=== Beira Interior Sul ===
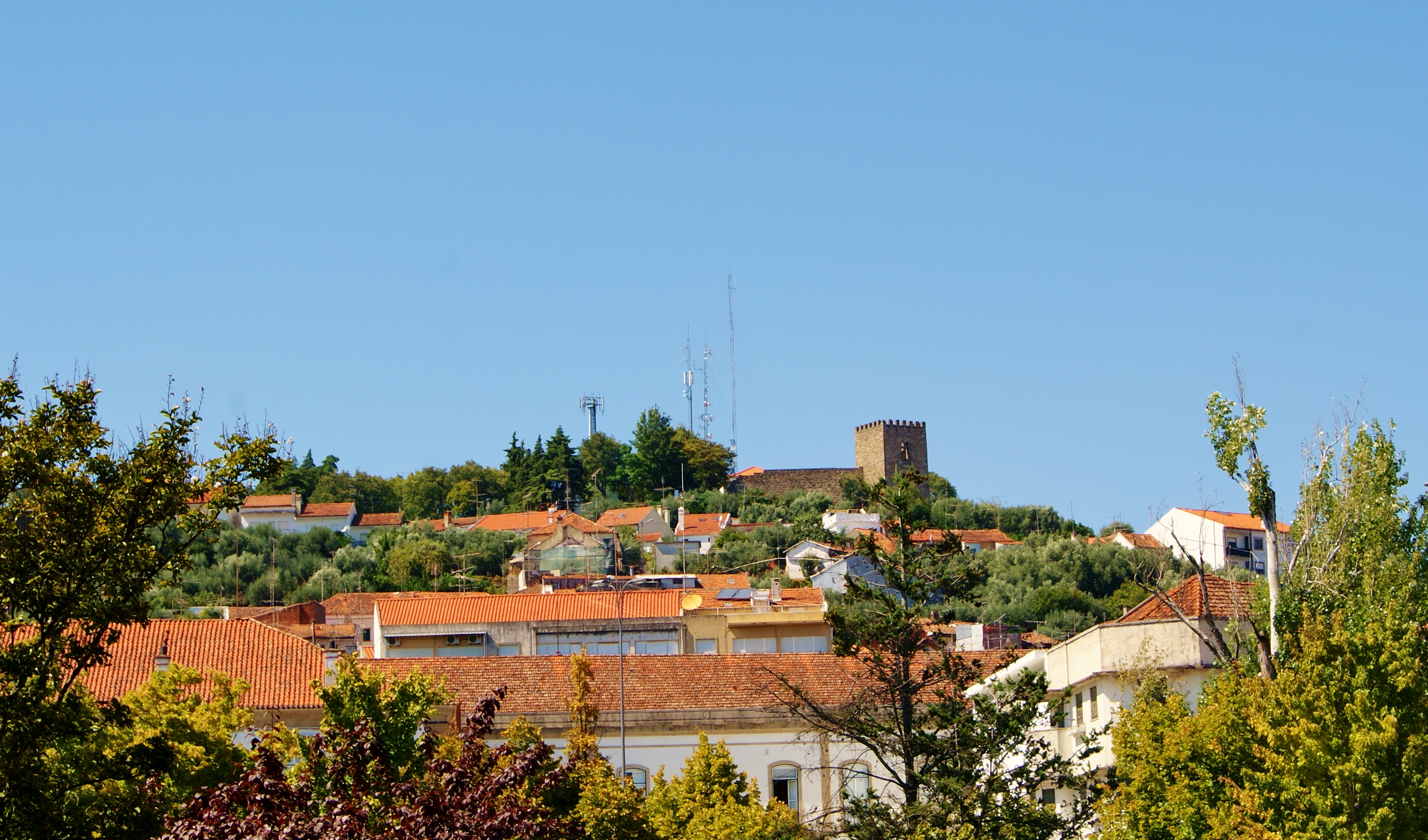
A distant view of Castelo Branco's castle

- Castle of Castelo Branco (Castelo Branco, Castelo Branco)
- Castle of Idanha-a-Nova (Idanha-a-Nova e Alcafozes, Idanha-a-Nova)
- Castle of Monsanto (Monsanto e Idanha-a-Velha, Idanha-a-Nova)
- Castle of Penamacor (Penamacor, Penamacor)
- Castle of Penha Garcia (Penha Garcia, Idanha-a-Nova)
- Castle of Rodão (Vila Velha de Ródão, Vila Velha de Ródão)
- Castle of Salvaterra do Extremo (Monfortinho e Salvaterra do Extremo, Idanha-a-Nova)
- Castle of Zebreira (Zebreira e Segura, Idanha-a-Nova)
- Clocktower of Castelo Branco (Castelo Branco, Castelo Branco)
- Tower of Lucano (Monsanto e Idanha-a-Velha, Idanha-a-Velha)
- Walls of Idanha-a-Velha (Monsanto e Idanha-a-Velha, Idanha-a-Velha)

=== Cova da Beira ===
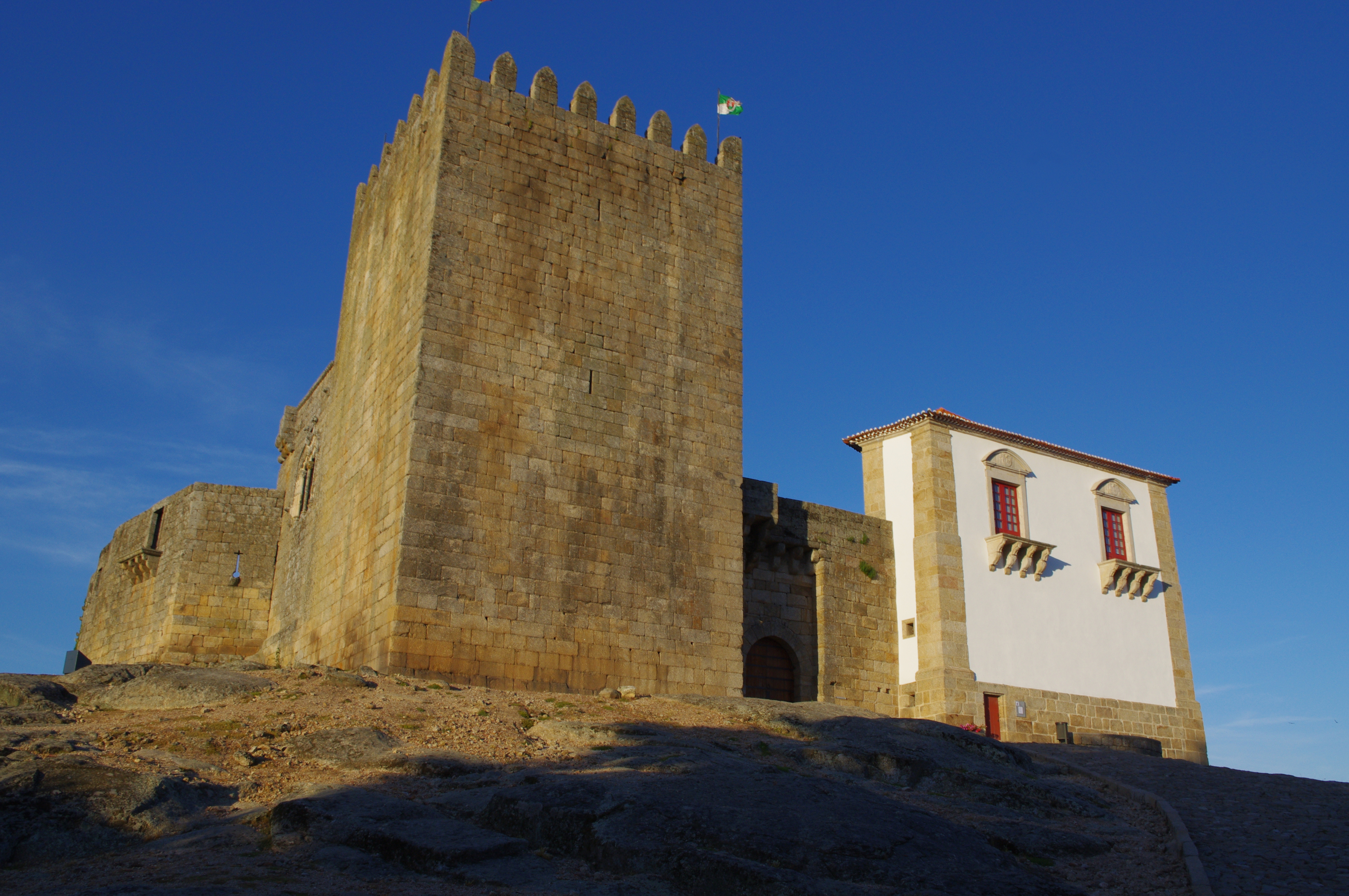
The mixed architecture of the Castle of Belmonte

- Castle of Belmonte (Belmonte e Colmeal da Torre, Belmonte)
- Castle of Castelo Novo (Castelo Novo, Fundão)
- Walls of Covilhã (Covilhã e Canhoso, Covilhã)

=== Dão-Lafões ===
- Castle of Aguiar da Beira (Aguiar da Beira e Coruche, Aguiar da Beira)
- Castle of Penalva/Coruto (Castelo de Penalva, Penalva do Castelo)
- Castle of Prado (Silvã de Cima, Sátão)
- Castle of Viseu (Viseu, Viseu)
- Tower of Ferreira de Aves (Ferreira de Aves, Sátão

=== Pinhal Interior Norte ===
- Castle of Avô (Avô, Oliveira de Hospital)
- Castle of Germanelo (São Miguel, Santa Eufémia e Rabaçal, Penela)
- Castle of Lousã (Lousã e Vilarinho, Lousã)
- Castle of Penela (São Miguel, Santa Eufémia e Rabaçal, Penela)

=== Pinhal Interior Sul ===
- Castle of Amêndoa (Amêndoa, Mação)
- Castle of Sertã (Sertã, Sertã)

=== Pinhal Litoral ===
One of the corner towers of the Castle of Leiria

- Castle of Leiria (Leiria, Pousos, Barreira e Cortes, Leiria)
- Castle of Pombal (Pombal, Pombal)
- Castle of Porto de Mós (Porto de Mós (São João Baptista e São Pedro), Porto de Mós)
- Castle of Redinha (Redinha, Pombal)
- Castle of Folgosinho (Folgosinho, Gouveia)

== Oeste e Vale do Tejo ==
=== Lezíria do Tejo ===
- Castle of Alcanede (Alcanede, Santarém)
- Castle of Santarém (Santarém (Marvila), Santa Iria da Ribeira de Santarém, Santarém (São Salvador) e Santarém (São Nicolau), Santarém)

=== Médio Tejo ===
- Castle of Abrantes (Abrantes (São Vicente e São João) e Alferrarede, Abrantes)
- Castle of Almourol (Praia do Ribatejo, Vila Nova da Barquinha)
- Castle of Ourém (Nossa Senhora das Misericórdias, Ourém)
- Castle of Tomar (Tomar (São João Baptista) e Santa Maria dos Olivais, Tomar)
- Castle of Torres Novas (Torres Novas (São Pedro), Lapas e Ribeira Branca, Torre Novas)
- Ruins of the Tower Palace (Constância, Constância)
- Tower of Dornes (Nossa Senhora do Pranto, Ferreira de Zêzere)
- Tower of Langalhão (Areias e Pias, Ferreira de Zêzere)

=== Oeste ===
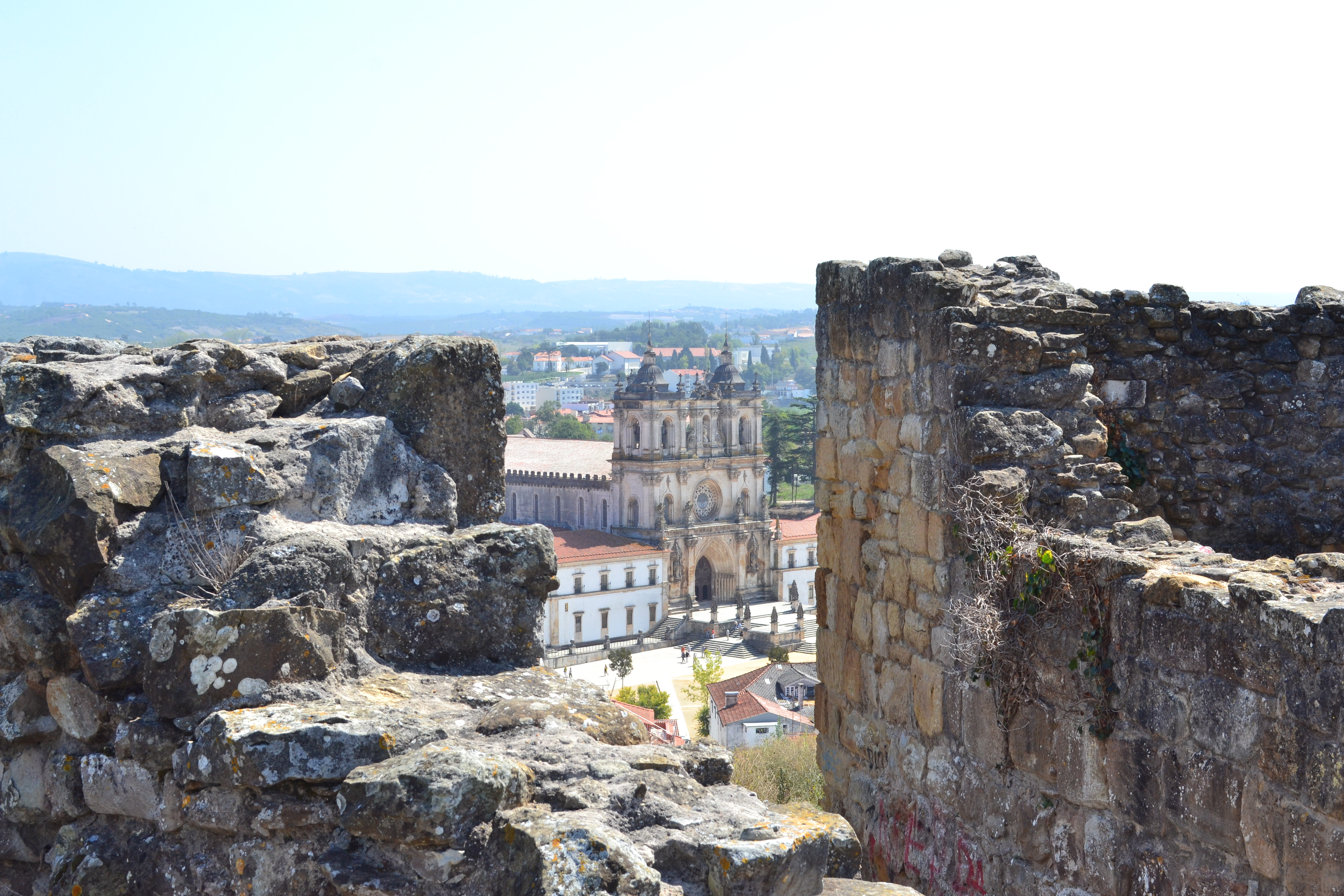
The ruins of the Castle of Alcobaça looking towards the monastery

- Castle of Alenquer (Alenquer (Santo Estêvão e Triana), Alenquer)
- Castle of Vila Verde dos Francos (Vila Verde dos Francos, Alenquer)
- Castle of Alcobaça (Alcobaça e Vestiaria, Alcobaça)
- Castle of Alfeizerão (Alfeizerão, Alcobaça)
- Castle of Atouguia da Baleia (Atouguia da Baleia, Peniche)
- Castle of Óbidos (Santa Maria, São Pedro e Sobral da Lagoa, Óbidos)
- Castle of Torres Vedras (Torres Vedras (São Pedro, Santiago, Santa Maria do Castelo e São Miguel) e Matacães, Torres Vedras)
- Tower of Dom Framondo (Famalicão, Nazaré)

== Grande Lisboa ==
=== Grande Lisboa ===
The battlements of the historic castle of Moors in Sintra

- Castle of Cascais (Cascais e Estoril, Cascais)
- Castle of Colares (Colares, Sintra)
- Castle of São Jorge (Santa Maria Maior, Lisbon)
- Castle of the Moors (Sintra (Santa Maria e São Miguel, São Martinho e São Pedro de Penaferrim), Sintra)
- Tower of Largo do Terreirinho (Sacavém e Prior Velho, Loures)
- Watchtower of Boca do Inferno (Cascais e Estoril, Cascais)

== Peninsula of Setúbal ==
=== Península de Setúbal ===
- Castle of Almada (Almada, Cova da Piedade, Pragal e Cacilhas, Almada)
- Castle of Palmela (Palmela, Palmela)
- Castle of Sesimbra (Sesimbra (Castelo), Sesimbra)
- Castle of Sines (Sines, Sines)

== Alentejo ==
=== Alentejo Central ===
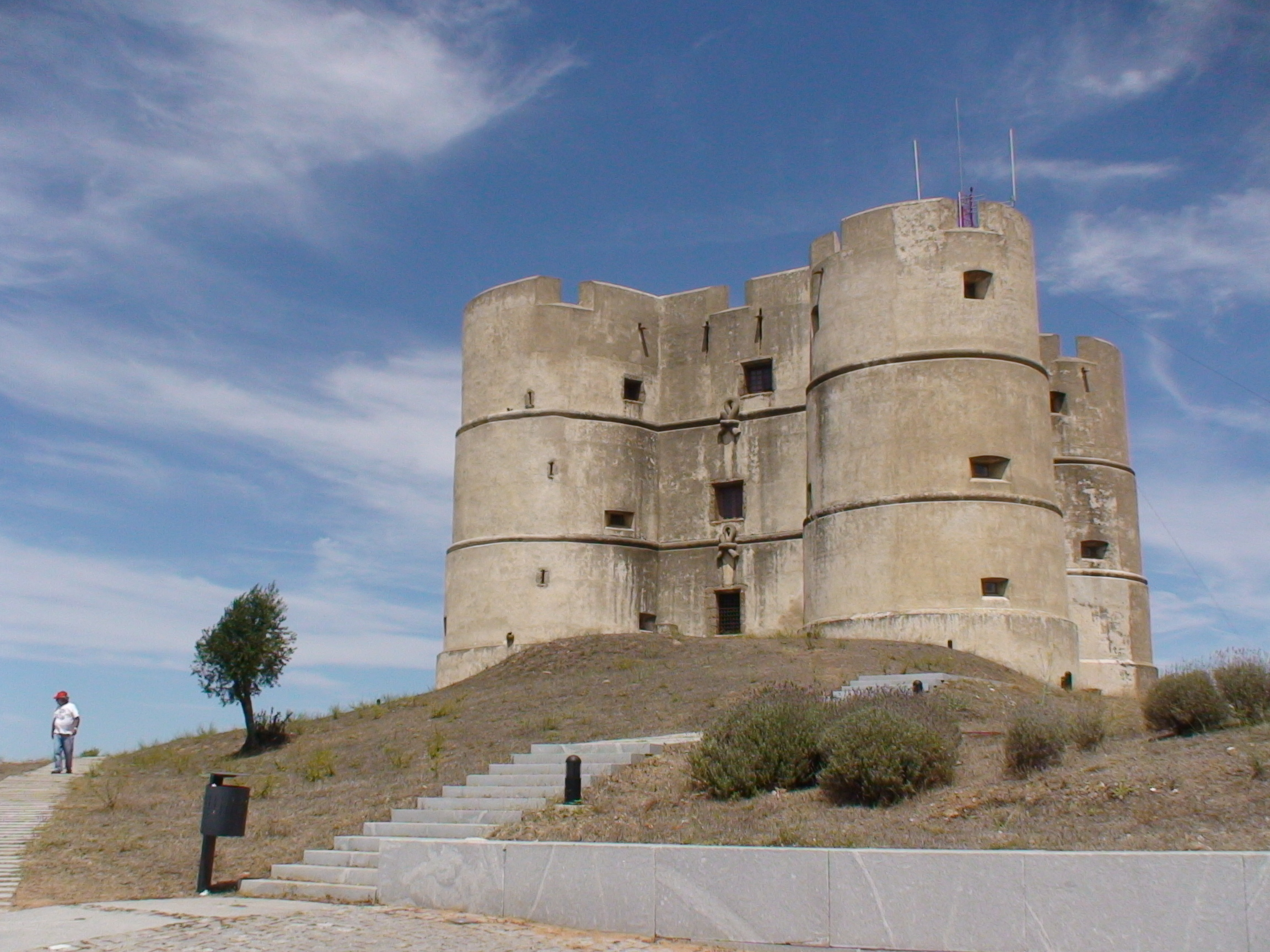
An isolated view of the keep tower of Evoramonte

- Castle of Alandroal (Alandroal (Nossa Senhora da Conceição), São Brás dos Matos (Mina do Bugalho) e Juromenha (Nossa Senhora do Loreto), Alandroal)
- Castle of Arraiolos (Arraiolos, Arraiolos)
- Castle of Azinhalinho (Corval, Reguengos de Monsaraz)
- Castle of Borba (Borba (Matriz), Borba)
- Castle of Degebe (Reguengos de Monsaraz, Reguengos de Monsaraz)
- Castle of Estremoz (Estremoz (Santa Maria e Santo André), Estremoz)
- Castle of Evoramonte (Évora Monte (Santa Maria), Estremoz)
- Castle of Juromenha (Alandroal (Nossa Senhora da Conceição), São Brás dos Matos (Mina do Bugalho) e Juromenha (Nossa Senhora do Loreto), Alandroal)
- Castle of Mourão (Mourão, Mourão)
- Castle of Monsaraz (Monsaraz, Reguengos de Monsaraz)
- Castle of Montemor-o-Novo (Nossa Senhora da Vila, Nossa Senhora do Bispo e Silveiras, Montemor-o-Novo)
- Castle of Pontega (Igrejinha, Portel)
- Castle of Portel (Portel, Portel)
- Castle of Redondo (Redondo, Redondo)
- Castle of Terena (Terena (São Pedro), Alandroal)
- Castle of Valongo (Nossa Senhora de Machede, Évora)
- Castle of Veiros (Veiros, Estremoz)
- Castle of Viana do Alentejo (Viana do Alentejo, Viana do Alentejo)
- Castle of Vila Viçosa (Nossa Senhora da Conceição e São Bartolomeu, Vila Viçosa)
- Watchtower of Cabeço do Mouro (Nossa Senhora da Graça do Divor, Évora)
- Watchtower of Frandina (Estremoz (Santa Maria e Santo André), Estremoz)
- Watchtower of São Gens do Xarez (Monsaraz, Reguengos de Monsaraz)
- Watchtower of Vale de Boim (Portel, Portel)

=== Alentejo Litoral ===
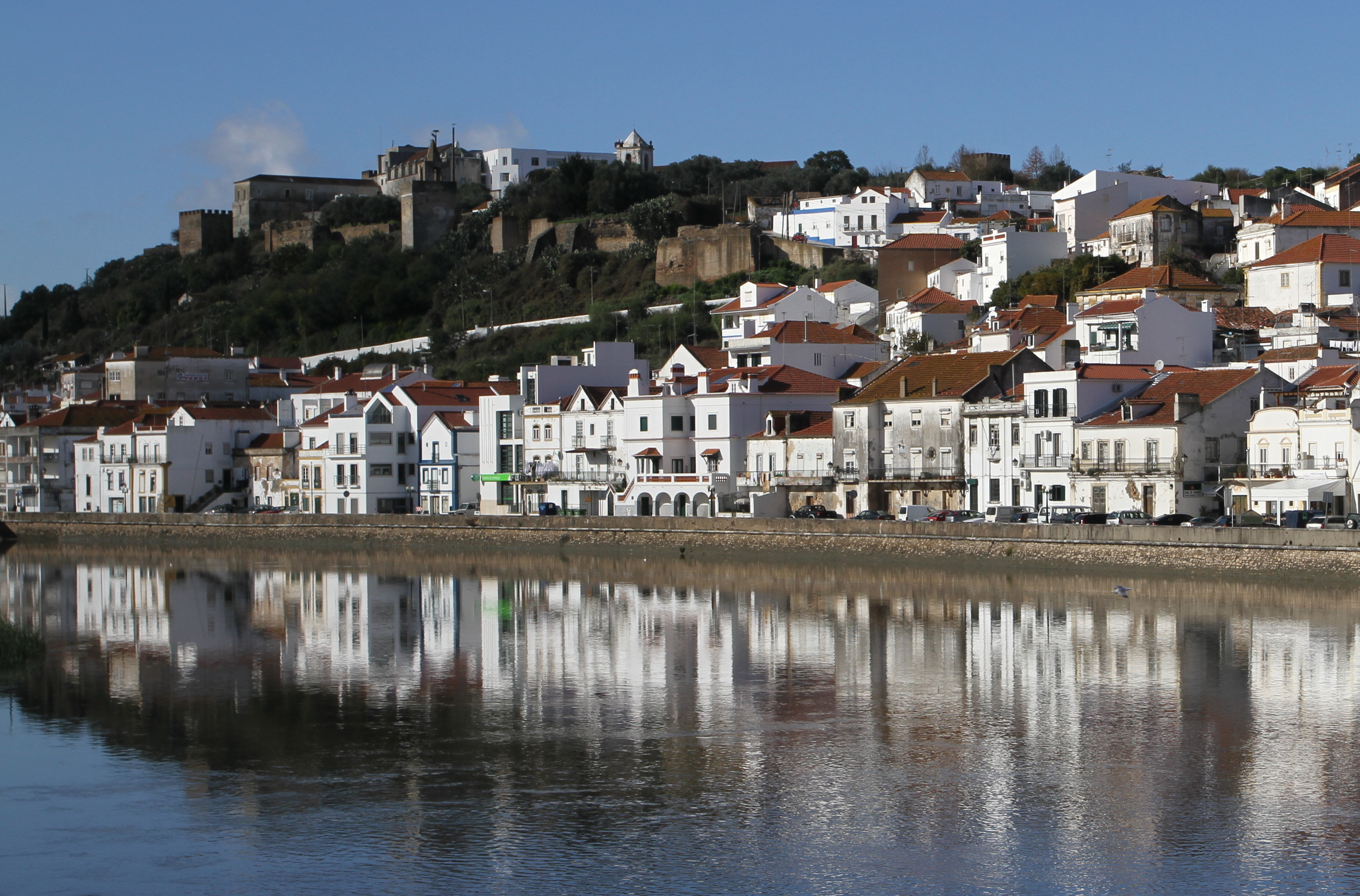
The castle at Alcácer do Sal overlooking the Sado river community

- Castle of Alcácer do Sal (Alcácer do Sal (Santa Maria do Castelo e Santiago) e Santa Susana, Alcácer do Sal)
- Castle of Odemira (São Salvador e Santa Maria, Odemira)
- Castle of Santiago do Cacém (Santiago do Cacém, Santa Cruz e São Bartolomeu da Serra, Santiago do Cacém)

=== Alto Alentejo ===
- Castle of Alegrete (Alegrete, Portalegre)
- Castle of Alpalhão (Alpalhão, Nisa)
- Castle of Alter do Chão (Alter do Chão, Alter do Chão)
- Castle of Alter Pedroso (Alter do Chão, Alter do Chão)
- Castle of Amieira (Arez e Amieira do Tejo, Nisa)
- Castle of Assumar (Assumar, Monforte)
- Castle of Avis (Avis, Avis)
- Castle of Barbacena (Barbacena e Vila Fernando, Elvas)
- Castle of Belver (Belver, Gavião)
- Castle of Cabeço de Vide (Cabeço de Vide, Fronteira)
- Castle of Campo Maior (São João Baptista, Campo Maior)
- Castle of Castelo de Vide (Santa Maria de Devassa, Castelo de Vide)
- Castle of Crato (Crato e Mártires, Flor da Rosa e Vale do Peso, Crato)
- Castle of Elvas (Caia, São Pedro e Alcáçova, Elvas)
- Castle of Fontalva (Santa Eulália, Elvas)
- Castle of Lousa (Luz, Mourão)
- Castle of Marvão (Santa Maria de Marvão, Portalegre)
- Castle of Monforte (Monforte, Monforte)
- Castle of Montalvão (Montalvão, Nisa)
- Castle of Nisa (Espírito Santo, Nossa Senhora da Graça e São Simão, Nisa)
- Castle of Ouguela (São João Baptista, Campo Maior)
- Castle of Portalegre (Sé e São Lourenço, Portalegre)
- Castle of Seda (Seda, Alter do Chão)
- Castle of Torrejão (Reguengo e São Julião, Portalegre)
- Castle of Vila Boim (Terrugem e Vila Boim, Elvas)
- Watchtower of Atalaião (Sé e São Lourenço, Portalegre)
- Watchtower of Baldio de Arronches (Assunção, Arronches)

=== Baixo Alentejo ===
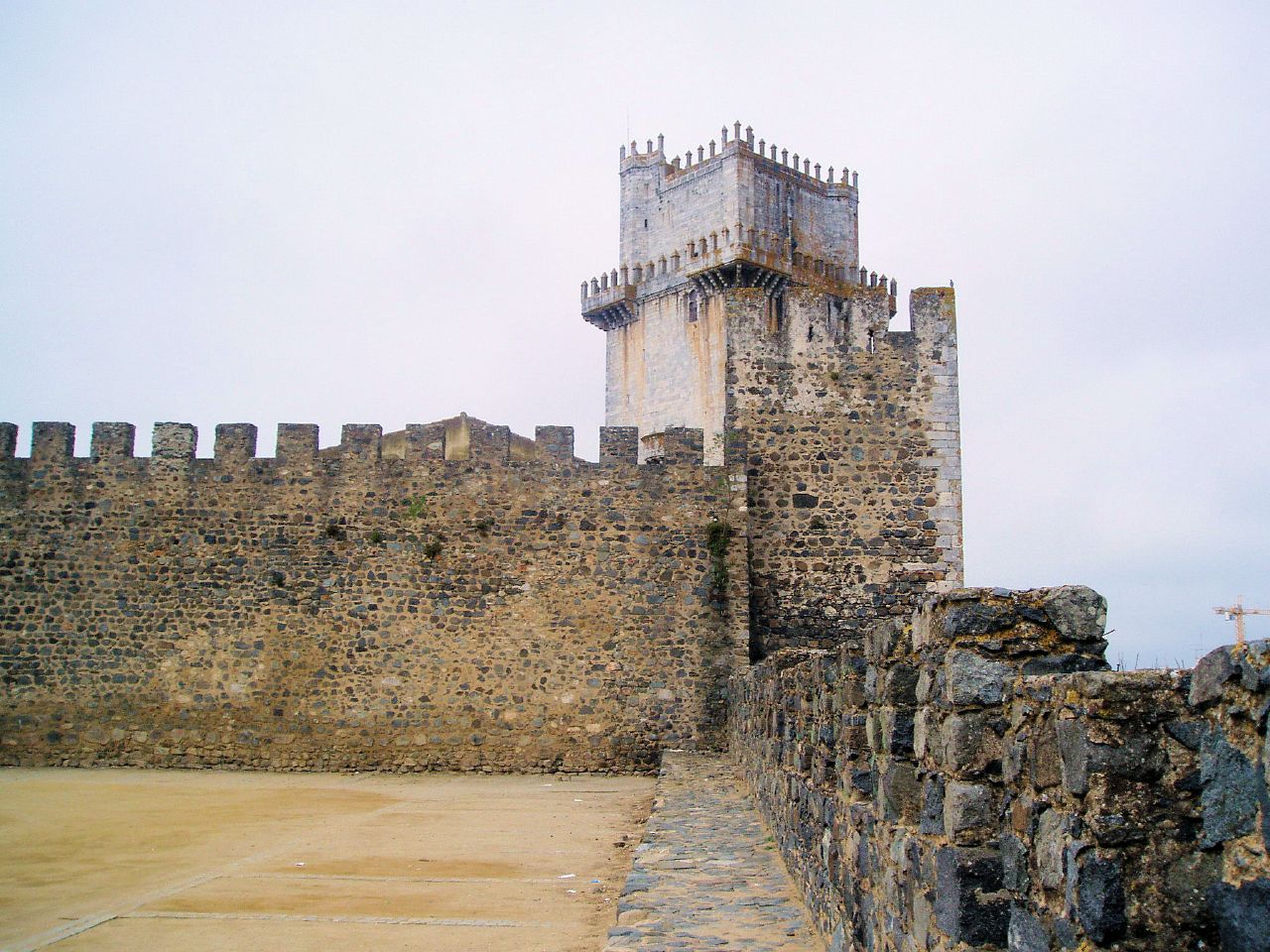
The keep tower of the walled city of Beja

- Castle of Aljustrel (Aljustrel e Rio de Moinhos, Aljustrel)
- Castle of Alvito (Alvito, Alvito)
- Castle of Beja (Beja (Santiago Maior e São João Baptista), Beja)
- Castle of Mértola (Mértola, Mertóla)
- Castle of Messejana (Messejana, Aljustrel)
- Castle of Moura (Moura (Santo Agostinho e São João Baptista) e Santo Amador, Moura)
- Castle of Noudar (Barrancos, Barrancos)
- Castle of Ourique (Ourique, Ourique)
- Castle of Serpa (Serpa (Salvador e Santa Maria), Serpa)
- Castle of Vidigueria (Vidigueira, Vidigueira)
- Clocktower of Serpa (Serpa (Salvador e Santa Maria), Serpa)
- Watchtower of Cabeça Magra (Moura (Santo Agostinho e São João Baptista) e Santo Amador, Moura)

== Algarve ==
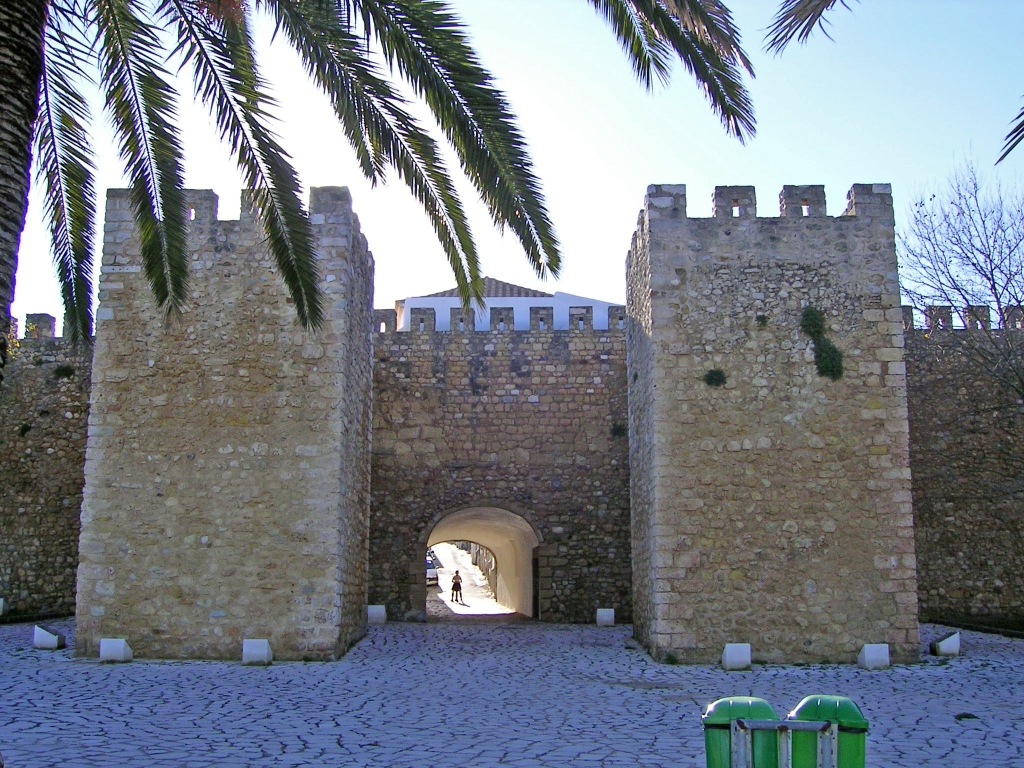
A view of the main gates to the Castle of Senhora da Luz, known as the Castle of Lagos

- Castle of Albufeira (Albufeira e Olhos de Água, Albufeira)
- Castle of Alcoutim (Alcoutim e Pereiro, Alcoutim)
- Castle of Alcantarilha (Alcantarilha e Pêra, Silves)
- Castle of Alcoutim (Old) (Alcoutim e Pereiro, Alcoutim)
- Castle of Aljezur (Aljezur, Aljezur)
- Castle of Alvor (Alvor, Portimão)
- Castle of Castro Marim (Castro Marim, Castro Marim)
- Castle of Estômbar (Estômbar e Parchal, Lagoa)
- Castle of Senhora da Luz (Luz, Lagos)
- Castle of Loulé (Loulé (São Sebastião), Loulé)
- Castle of Paderne (Paderne, Albufeira)
- Castle of Salir (Salir, Loulé)
- Castle of Silves (Silves, Silves)
- Castle of Tavira (Tavira (Santa Maria e Santiago), Tavira)
- Fortress of Faro (Faro (Sé e São Pedro), Faro)
- Tower of Aires (Luz de Tavira e Santo Estêvão, Tavira)
- Tower of Aspa (Vila do Bispo e Raposeira, Vila do Bispo)
- Tower of Atalaia (Luz, Lagos)
- Tower of Guia (Guia, Albufeira)
- Tower of Medronheira (Ferreiras, Albufeira)
- Watchtower of Ponta do Altar (Ferragudo, Lagoa)

== Madeira ==
- Fort of São Bento da Ribeira Brava (Ribeira Brava, Ribeira Brava)
- Tower of Bom Despacho (Campanário, Ribeira Brava)
- Tower of Capitão (Santo António, Funchal)

== Azores ==
- Tower/Bartizan of Porto Pim (Angústias, Horta)

== See also ==
- Castles in Portugal
