= Castle of Vila Verde dos Francos =

Castle in Lisbon District, Portugal

- Castelo de Vila Verde dos Francos
- Lisbon, Oeste, Centro in Portugal
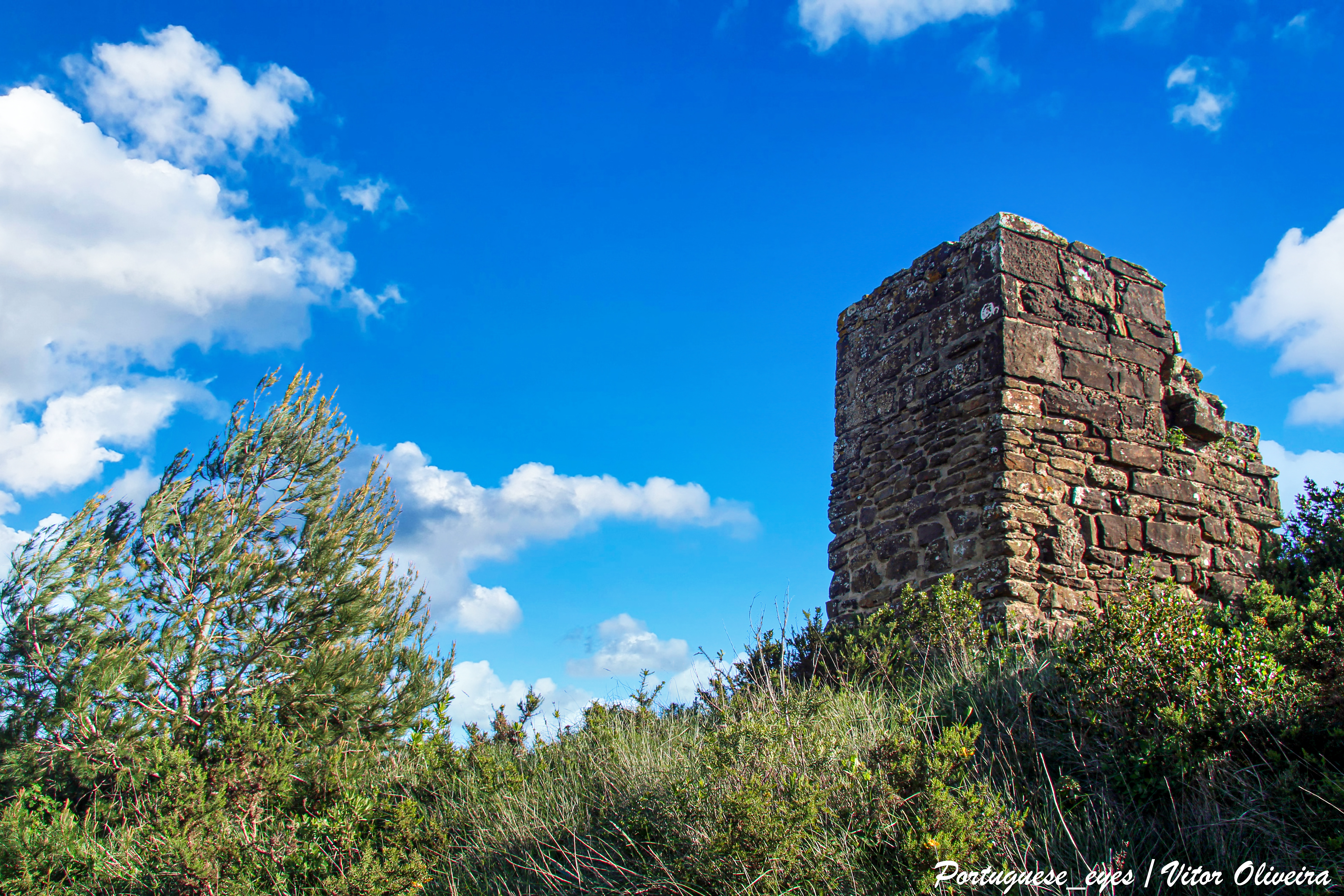

Site information
- Type: Castle
- Owner: Portuguese Republic
- Open to the public: Public

Location
- Coordinates: 39°9′25.3″N 9°7′19.2″W

Site history
- Materials: Limestone, Mixtum vittatum

The Castle of Vila Verde dos Francos (Portuguese: Castelo de Vila Verde dos Francos) is a ruined medieval castle located in the civil parish of Vila Verde dos Francos, in the municipality of Alenquer, Portuguese district of Lisbon.

== History ==
The early human occupation of the region dates back to prehistory; as archaeological evidence suggest, the region was visited and settled by successive centuries of Greek, Phoenician, Carthaginian, Roman, Goth and Muslim peoples.

In 1160, D. Afonso Henriques donated Vila Verde dos Francos to D. Alardo, a French Captain and group of Crusaders, in recognition for their support in conquering Lisbon, Sintra, Almada, Palmela and Alenquer. Tradition suggests that D. Alardo was responsible for constructing the castle, following the Henriques issuing a Foral (charter).

By the middle of the 18th century, there was already evidence that the castle was in ruins.

Much of the landscape was inundated with wild blackberries, necessitating the need to clear the terrain, consolidate masonry and reposition some stones.

The walls were further consolidated in 1987. At that time, researcher Jorge Peixoto, identified the compact structure as a chapel, dedicated to Sõa Luís.

== Architecture ==
The building is situated in an isolated rural area, implanted at the top of a small hill of outcrops, near the settlement, surrounded by agricultural fields and vineyards.

There remains several lines of foundation walls, forming an irregular plan. On the extremes are the remnants of rectangular towers with an entranceway along the lower part of the walls. On the opposite extreme, is a construction that could have resulted from the curvilinear segment of the wall, now in advanced state of ruin. Its general advance state of ruin makes it impossible to reconstitute its typology.
