= Castle of Sines =

Castle in Sines, Setúbal, Portugal

Coordinates: 37°57′19″N 8°52′00″W

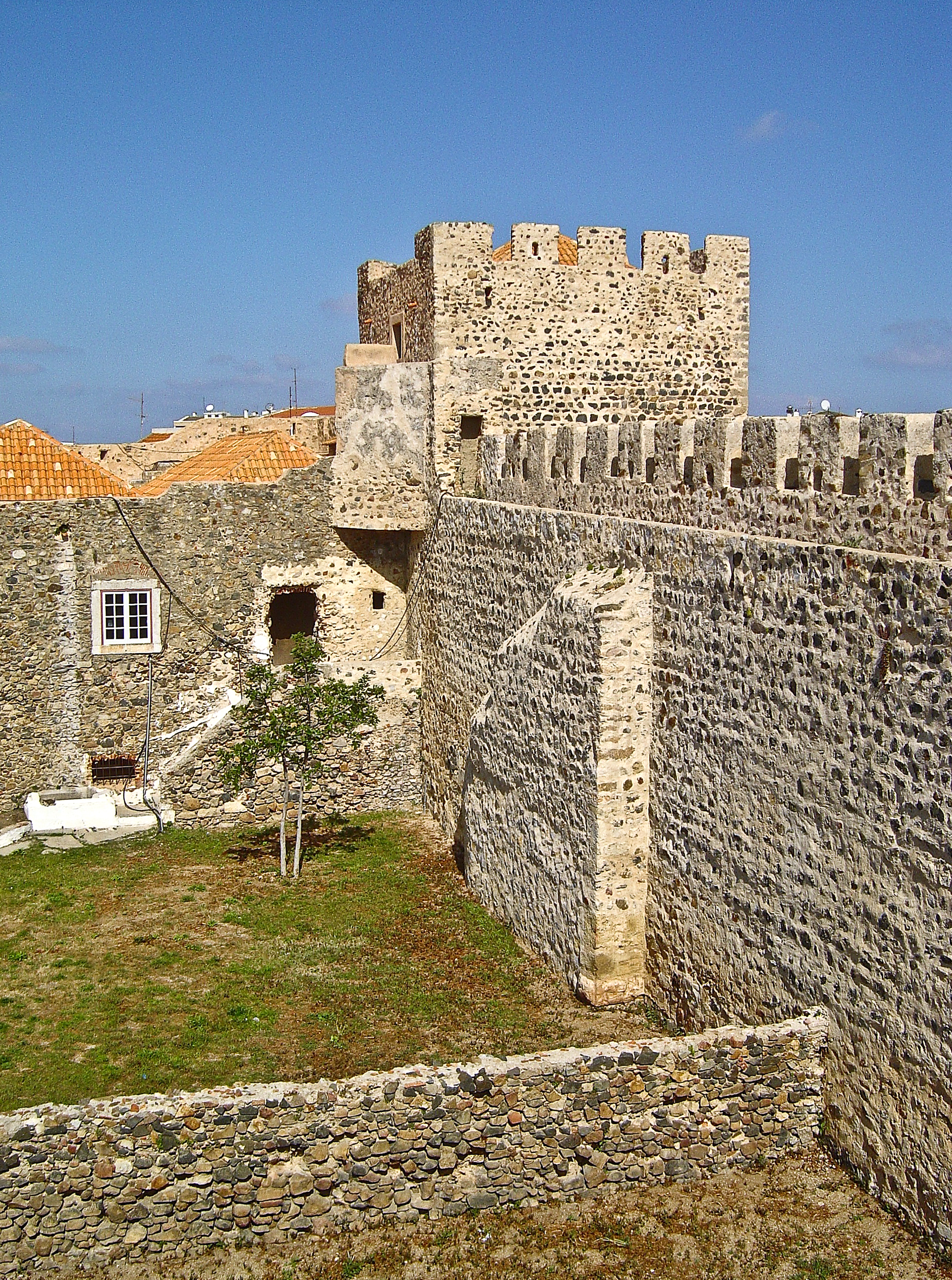
Castle of Sines in 2008

Castle of Sines is a castle in Portugal. It is classified by IGESPAR as a Site of Public Interest.
