= Castle of Alfaiates =

Castle in Sabugal, Portugal

Coordinates: 40°23′25″N 6°54′42″W

Castelo de Alfaiates is a castle in Sabugal Municipality, Portugal. It is classified by IGESPAR as a Site of Public Interest.
