= Castle of Vidigueiras =

Building in Évora District, Portugal

- Castelo de Vidigueiras
- Évora, Alentejo Central, Alentejo in Portugal

Site information
- Type: Castle
- Owner: Portuguese Republic
- Open to the public: Private

Location
- Location of the castle within the municipality of Reguengos de Monsaraz
- Coordinates: 38°23′38.03″N 7°30′50.79″W

Site history
- Built: c. 1492
- Materials: Stone, Masonry, Granite

The Castle of Vidigueiras is a signeurial residential estate in the civil parish of Reguengos de Monsaraz in the municipality of Reguengos de Monsaraz in the Portuguese sub-region of Baixo Alentejo. It is the only residential project completed by landscape architect Francisco Caldeira Cabral.

== History ==
The estate was built in 1492, from research conducted by Túlio Espanca.

In 1909, the building was restored and remodeled to conform to its current appearance.

Between 1950 and 1959, an architectural project was completed to remodel the facades and interiors. This not only included cosmetic, but also changes to the agricultural installations and gardens, under the direction of landscape architect Francisco Caldeira, for then proprietor Dr. Cayola Bastos.

In the last half of the 20th century, the last property-owner, António de Monsaraz died.

== Architecture ==
Located in the Herdade das Vidigueiras situated 15 kilometres (9.3 mi) from Monsaraz de Reguengos, on the route between Reguengos de Monsaraz and São Marcos do Campo, just after the settlement of Herdade de Roncão. It is located on a rural plain, flanked and buttressed alongside the main building of the manor.

The rectangular plan, with three story articulated, vertical building, without a foundation and battlements. The principal facade, oriented towards the east, includes three vertical registers, and is marked on the first by a framed granite portico. On the remaining facades are large rectangular windows in stonework, while along the center block, there are cruciform slits on the merlons. The northern and southern facades link the estate with the remaining buildings of the manor. The lower floors and tower are broken by rectangular windows, while the western facade has no accesses.
