= Castle of São Ramão =

Castle in Portugal

Coordinates: 41.7362°N 7.8587°W

- Castelo de São Ramão
- Vila Real, Alto Trás-os-Montes, Norte Region, Portugal in Portugal

Site information
- Type: Castle
- Owner: Portuguese Republic
- Operator: DRCPorto
- Open to the public: Public

Location
- Location of the castle within the municipality of Montalegre

Site history
- Materials: Granite, Mortar

The Castle of São Ramão (Portuguese: Castelo de São Ramão) is a medieval castle located in the civil parish of Viade de Baixo e Fervidelas, in the municipality of Montalegre, Portuguese district of Vila Real.

== History ==
During the 1258 Inquiries, the site was identifiable with the royal properties of São Romanus.

In the 1758 Parochial Memories, it was part of Parafita, falling within the limits of the municipality of Montalegre. At that time, the then-ruins were referred to as "an impregnable and ancient castle". Father Baltazar Pereira Barroso, agreeing with the description, affirmed that the castle had its base in a Roman construction, substantiated by the vestiges of five Roman road that connected it to Braga. Continuing, he indicated the ruins were fabricated by people of "intelligence", and not by barbarians (suggesting the Moors), noting a painted calf idol constructed by Romans nearby. But, local residents from Veade, in search of treasures, demolished many of the memorable structures, including the calf and part of the cistern that existed at the heights of the castle. Half a league from the western wall near one of the Roman roads were the ruins of a fortification once referred to as the Castle of D. Rodrigo, where two farmers had built their homes on Roman foundations and parts of the walls; by 1758, there were still remnants of the Castle of São Romão and D. Rodrigo.

The firsts to preserve the remnants began on 16 November 1973. At that time, the Junta Nacional de Educação (National Junta for Education) proposed the classification of the castle a Property of Public Interest. This was superseded on 6 March 2006, by the DRPorto, which proposed the establishment of a Special Protection Zone for the property, leading to the classification of the property as a Sítio de Interesse Público and incorporating it into its own Special Protection Zone on 10 January 2014 (Diário da República, Série 2, 7, Ordinance 20/2014).

== Architecture ==
The site is situated on a rural, isolated hilltop covered in gorse and undergrowth, marked by a difficult access and overlooking the Rabagão River.

The rocky castle was circled by a line of walls with the settlement excavated into outcrop and constructed with large ashlar stone. At the top of the hill are the vestiges of a tower and cistern, whose walls are carved into the stone or constructed of granite and mortar, 3.3 by 2.5 by 1.3 metres (10.8 ft × 8.2 ft × 4.3 ft).

On the eastern, western and southern platforms are the visible foundations of residential structures built with large ashlar stone.

Artefacts from the archaeological dig include fragments of medieval pottery, numismatic elements, grindstones and half-round roofing tile.
