= Castle of Montemor-o-Novo =

Castle in Montemor-o-Novo, Évora, Portugal

Coordinates: 38.6425°N 8.2156°W

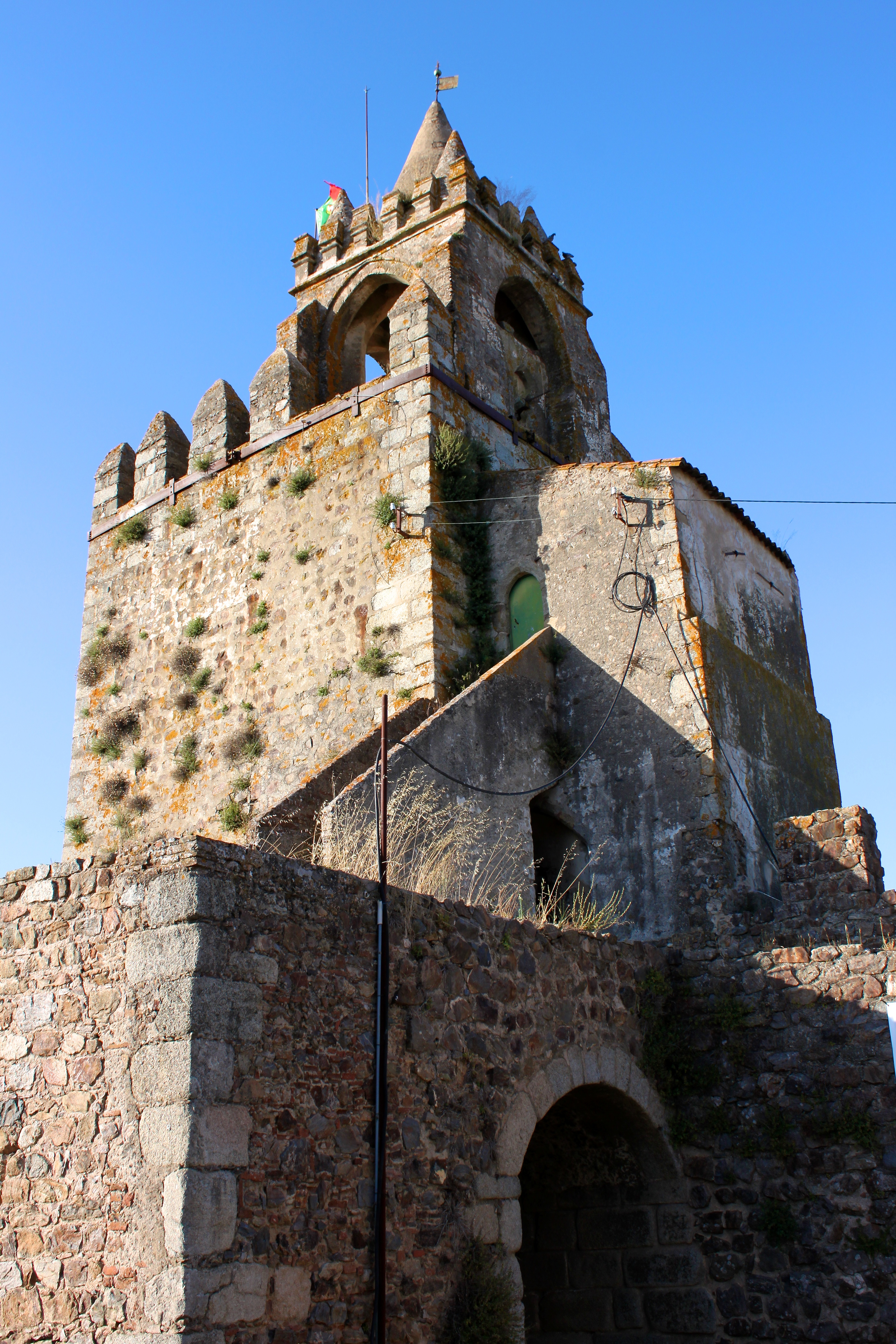
Castle of Montemor-o-Novo in 2011

The Castle of Montemor-o-Novo (Portuguese: Castelo de Montemor-o-Novo) is a Portuguese castle in the parish of Nossa Senhora da Vila, Nossa Senhora do Bispo e Silveiras, municipality of Montemor-o-Novo, district of Évora. The castle was built on the site of a possible Roman fort, which was probably destroyed during an invasion by the Almohad Caliphate. In 1203 Montemor-o-Novo was granted a charter so this is likely the time period when the castle was built, and then in 1310 Denis of Portugal further fortified the castle as did the mayor João de Bragança during the 14th century. It is classified as a National Monument since 1951.
