= Águas Frias =

Coordinates: 26°52′48″S 52°51′32″W

- Municipality
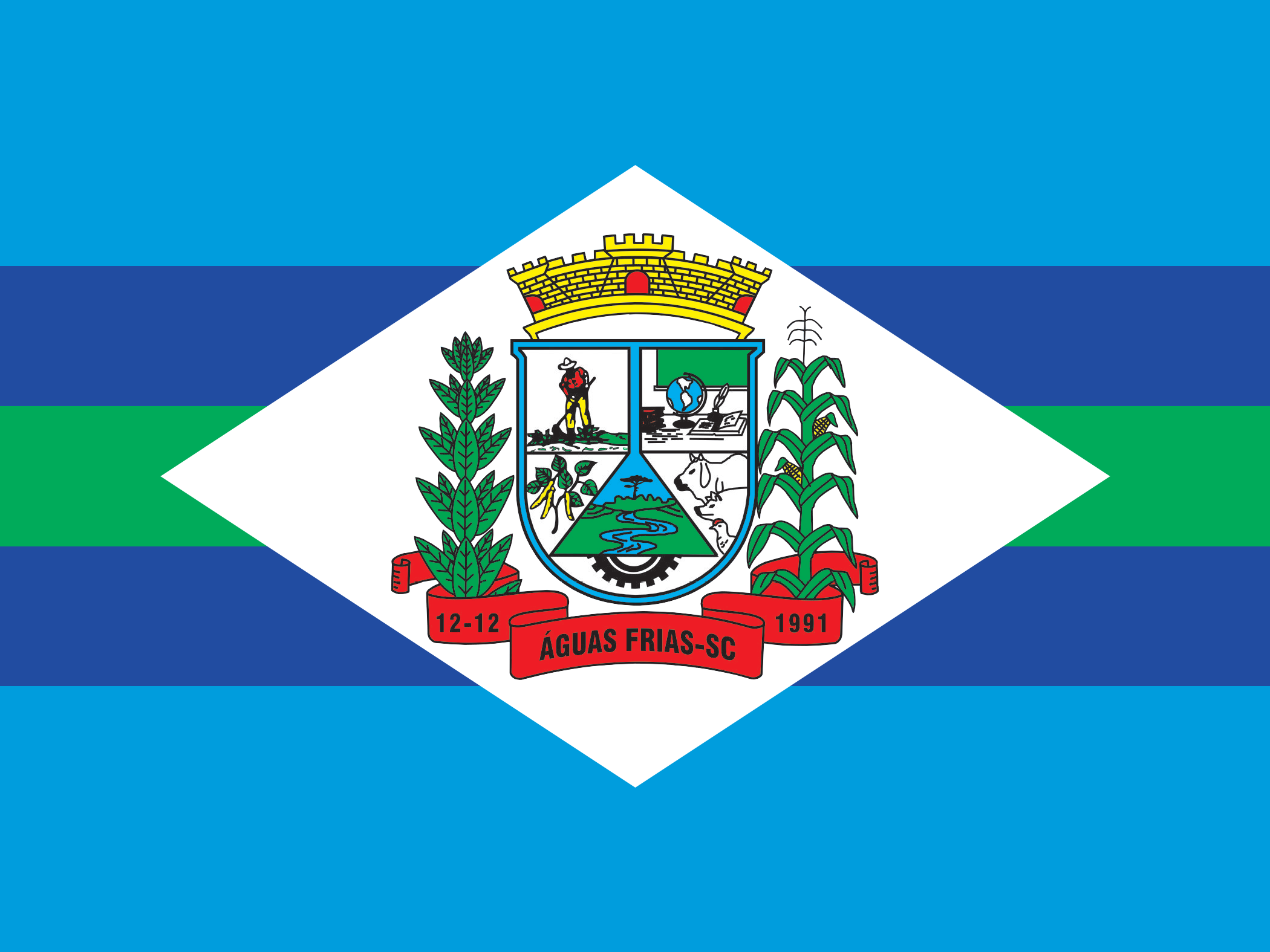
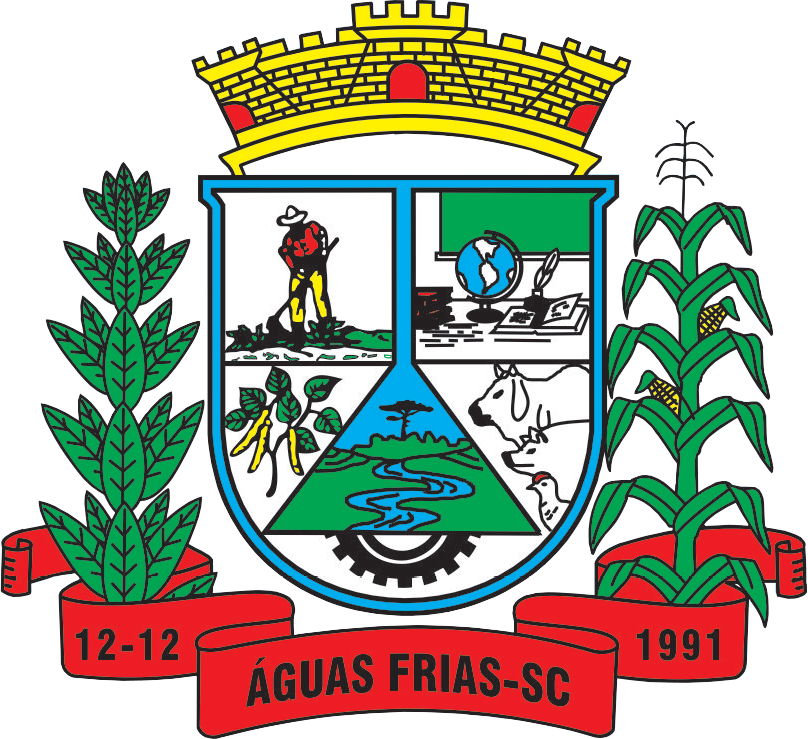
- Flag Coat of arms
- Interactive map of Águas Frias
- Country: Brazil
- Region: South
- State: Santa Catarina
- Mesoregion: Oeste Catarinense

Population (2020)
  - Total: 2,354
- Time zone: UTC−3 (BRT)
- Website: www.aguasfrias.sc.gov.br

Águas Frias is a municipality in the state of Santa Catarina in the South region of Brazil.

== See also ==
- List of municipalities in Santa Catarina
