= Castelo de Porto de Mós =

Castle in Leiria, Portugal

Coordinates: 39°36′12″N 8°49′07″W

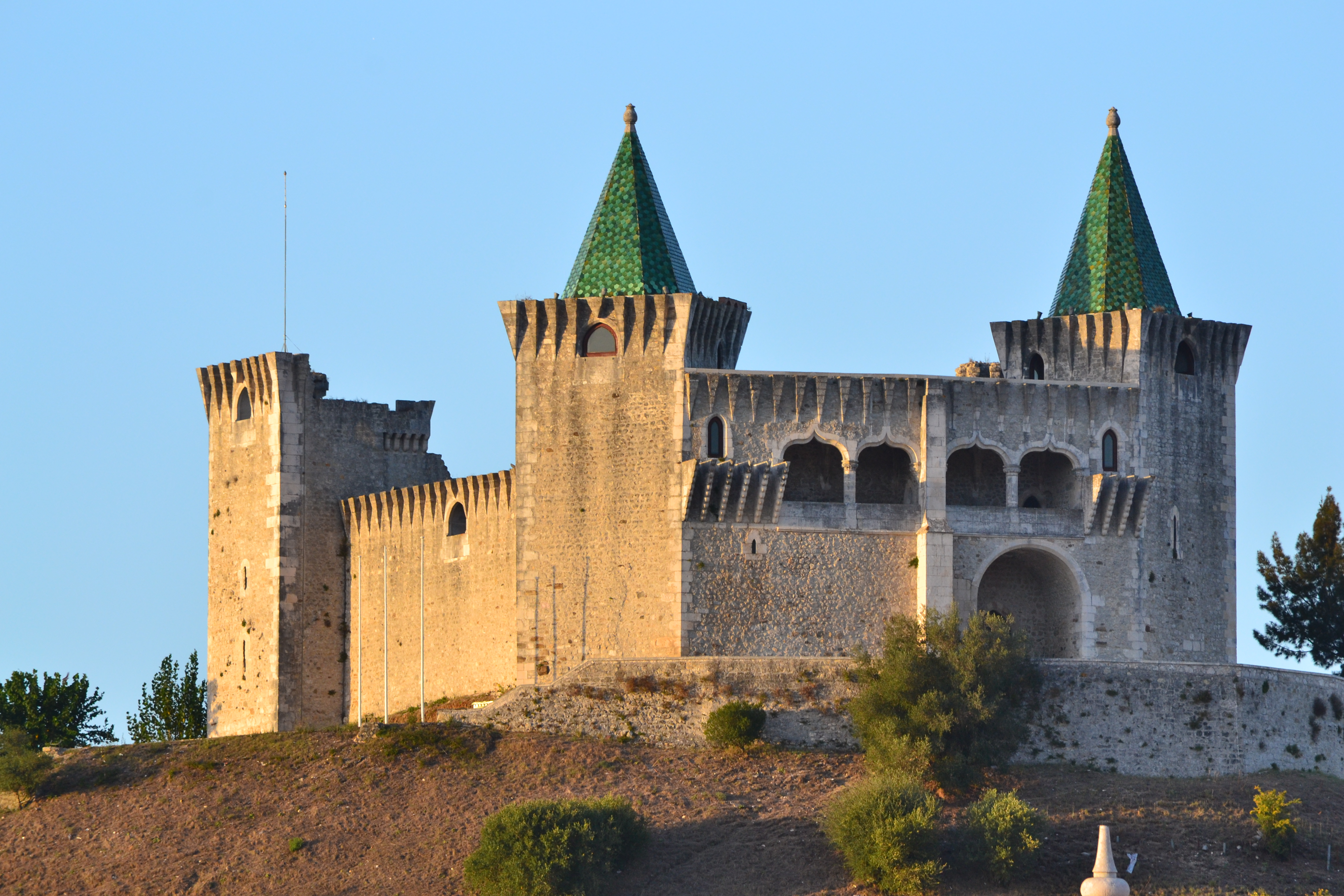
Exterior view of the castle

Castelo de Porto de Mós is a castle in Portugal. It is classified as a National Monument.

The monument was visited by 26,800 people in 2022.
