= Castle of Celorico da Beira =

Portuguese castle

Coordinates: 40°38′09″N 07°23′36″W

Castelo de Celorico da Beira is a castle in Portugal. It is classified as a National Monument.
