= Castle of Crato =

Portuguese castle

Coordinates: 39°17′05″N 7°38′34″W

The Castle of Crato (Portuguese: Castle of Crato) is a medieval castle in the civil parish of Crato e Mártires, Flor da Rosa e Vale do Peso, municipality of Crato, Portuguese district of Portalegre.

It is classified by IGESPAR as a Site of Public Interest.
