= Castle of Azinhalinho =

Medieval castle in Portugal

The Castle of Azinhalinho (Portuguese: Castelo de Azinhalinho) is a medieval castle ruin in the civil parish of Corval, municipality of Reguengos de Monsaraz, the Portuguese district of Évora. It was constructed sometime during the reign of Afonso III of Portugal.

It is classified by DGPC as a Site of Public Interest.
