= Castelo de Ranhados =

Castle in Portugal

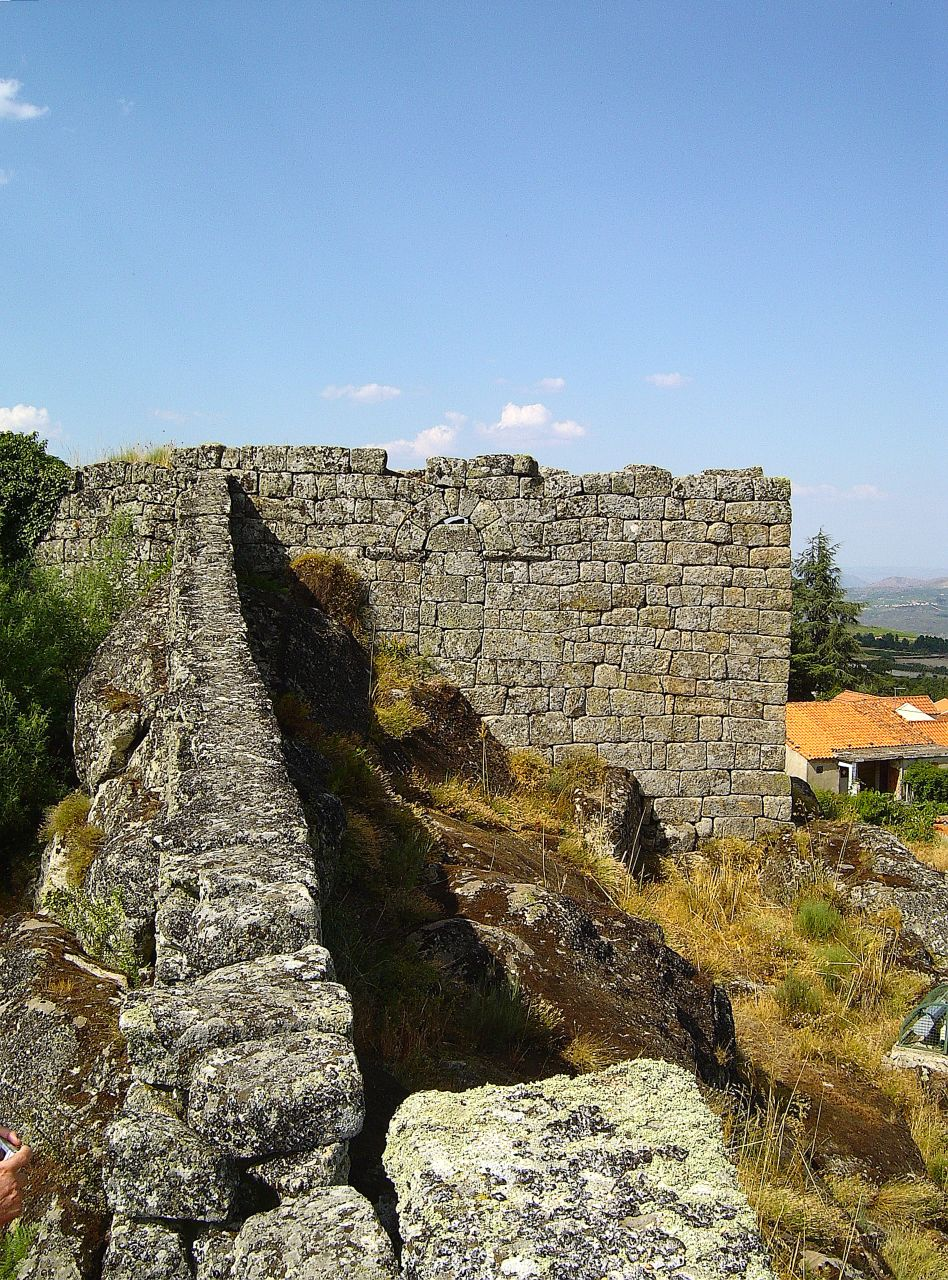

Castelo de Ranhados is a Portuguese castle in the parish of Ranhados, municipality of Mêda, district of Guarda. The castle was either built in 1286 when King Denis gave a charter to reconstruct a castle from a Lusitanian fort or when in 1381 Ferdinand I donated the village to Távora brothers. The castle was mentioned in 1504 in a document of Beira. It is classified by IGESPAR as a Site of Public Interest since a decree in 1977.
