= Castle of Vila Flor =

Castle in Bragança District, Portugal

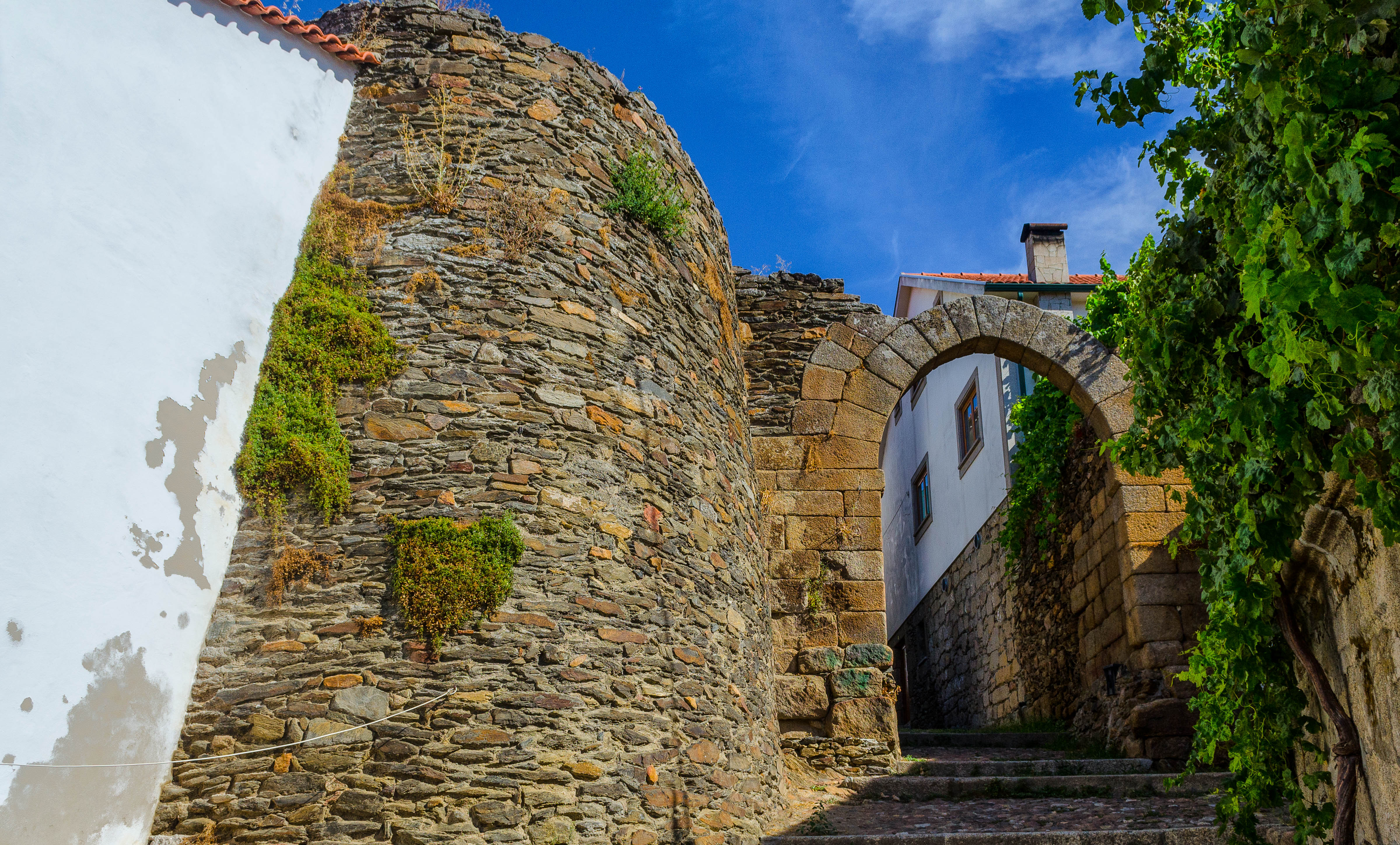
Dom Dinis Arch, part of the castle

The Castle of Vila Flor (Portuguese: Castelo de Vila Flor) is a medieval castle located in the civil parish of Vila Flor e Nabo, municipality of Vila Flor, Portuguese district of Bragança.

== History ==
=== Early history ===
The presence of several ancient forts in ruins suggest indicates that the region has been occupied by prehistoric humans.

=== Medieval era ===
Archeological and anecdotal evidence places the establishment of the village at the height of the Christian Reconquest of the Iberian Peninsula in the eleventh century.

It and the region became part of the Kingdom of Portugal under King Afonso I of Portugal upon Portugal's independence. On 24 May 1286, King Dinis (1279–1325) granted a Foral Charter to the village, the first time of its existence in the record books. In 1295, the king raised the village to the status of town.

The village was sympathetic to Jewish families who were expelled from other parts of Europe. An influx of immigration led to the development of agriculture, trade and manufacturing of leather and jewelry.

King Manuel (1495–1521) handed the town a new Foral Charter on 4 May 1512. However, the new charter was antisemitic and drove away many Jews, resulting in a massive decline of the population.

=== Modern day ===
Over time, the castle saw its usefulness decline. The townspeople neglected to maintain the castle and the fortress slowly eroded due to the force of nature. The castle is mostly in ruins with a few parts left standing.

It was later decreed a site of public interest by the Portuguese government on 20 October 1955.

== Characteristics ==
The castle is protected by a ring of wall that originally had five gates. Of these five ports, only one portcullis survives and is named as South Gate or Arch of D. Dinis. It is a pointed arch with dimensions of 3.5 meters wide by 4 meters high and is held by two semicircular plant towers.
