= Castle of Vila Nova de Foz Côa =

Castle in Vila Nova de Foz Côa, Guarda, Portugal

- Castelo de Vila Nova de Foz Côa
- Guarda, Douro, Norte Region, Portugal in Portugal

Site information
- Type: Castle
- Owner: Portuguese Republic
- Open to the public: Public

Location
- Coordinates: 41°4′59.6″N 7°8′6.4″W

Site history
- Built: 15th century
- Materials: Stone, Granite, Iron, Wood

The Castle of Vila Nova de Foz Côa (Portuguese: Castelo de Vila Nova de Foz Côa) is a medieval castle located in the civil parish of Vila Nova de Foz Côa, in the municipality of Vila Nova de Foz Côa, Portuguese Guarda.

== History ==
The castle was built sometime in the 15th century, during the reign of King D. Afonso V. Little remains of the original structure, except for some of the wall fortifications. Sometime later, the tower was constructed along the original group of walls.

In the 19th century, the tower was restored and by the end of that century, the clock and carrion was installed in the structure.

== Architecture ==
The castle is situated in an isolated position in the "castle" area, adapted to the unlevel hilltop. Surrounding it is the old urban nucleus of the town that has been eroded over the centuries. Around the castle are the municipal square, site of the municipal palace (Câmara Municipal de Vila Nova de Foz Côa) and old courts building, the parochial church of Vila Nova de Foz Côa, the Church of Nossa Senhora do Pranto, and pillory of Foz Côa.

The rectangular plan is composed of simple volumes, vertically oriented with terrace covering protected by iron grate. The masonry structure of decorated and painted white stone, marked by corners in granite with frieze and cornice that includes three-register facade. The first floor in granite with salient joints, painted in white, marked by a principal doorway in arch to the second floor. The second register is accessible by staircase addorsed to the facade, while the left lateral facade includes a small venting slit. On the second floor, located on the right, lateral facade is a framed slit with capialço and sundial display in granite, also square. The third floor and last register is separated by granite frieze, with gentle indent and the four faces of a circular clock.

The interior is crossed by wooden staircase and divided by ceilings.
