= Castle of Monforte (Figueira de Castelo Rodrigo) =

Castle in Guarda District, Portugal

- Castelo de Monforte
- Guarda, Alto Trás-os-Montes, Centro in Portugal

Site information
- Type: Castle
- Owner: Portuguese Republic
- Open to the public: Private

Location
- Coordinates: 40°52′38.7″N 6°57′50.3″W

Site history
- Built: 12th century
- Materials: Granite, Wood, Cement, Tile

The Castle of Monforte (Portuguese: Castelo de Monforte) is a medieval castle located in the civil parish of Colmeal e Vilar Torpim, in the municipality of Figueira de Castelo Rodrigo, Portuguese district of Guarda.

== History ==
Situated in the lands of Riba-Côa, the Castle was constructed in the 12th century.

It was mentioned in the Treaty of Alcañices (1297), but lost its strategic importance owing to the new frontier and abandoned.

During the Évora Cortes (1414) it was referred to as the local ermo (secluded place) by representatives of Castelo Rodrigo, and did not appear in the Livro das Fortalezas of Duarte de Armas, in the 16th century.

The castle is in ruins.

On 24 March 1993, a dispatch was issued to indicate the beginning of a process to classify castle. But, by 23 October 2009, the process had already expired under provisions of article 78 (Decree 309/2009, Diário da República, Série 1, 206 and altered by Decree 265/2012 on 28 December 2012). Under this provision, owing to there being no public consultation.

== Architecture ==
The ruins of the castle are situated on the northern edge of the locality of Bizarril, a hilltop community in the parish of Colmeal e Vilar Torpim.
