= Vale Verde =

Municipality of Rio Grande do Sul, Brazil

- Municipality
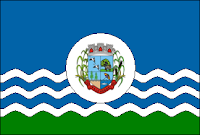
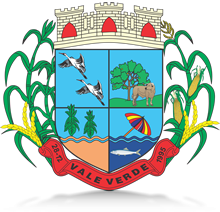
- Flag Coat of arms

- Location within Rio Grande do Sul

- Location in Brazil
- Coordinates: 29°46′59″S 52°11′05″W
- Country: Brazil
- State: Rio Grande do Sul

Population (2020)
  - Total: 3,515
- Time zone: UTC−3 (BRT)

Vale Verde is a municipality in Rio Grande do Sul, Brazil.

== See also ==
- List of municipalities in Rio Grande do Sul
