= Castle of Valongo =

Medieval castle in Évora, Portugal

- Castelo de Valongo
- Évora, Alentejo Central, Alentejo in Portugal
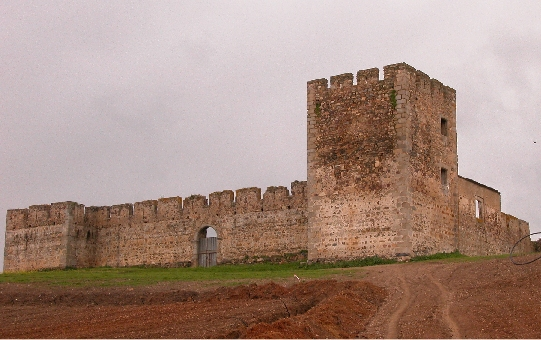

Site information
- Type: Castle
- Owner: Portuguese Republic
- Open to the public: Public

Location
- Coordinates: 38°31′0.9″N 7°39′4″W

Site history
- Materials: Granite, Masonry, Taipa, Marble, Tile, Zinc, Mortar (masonry)

The Castle of Valongo (Portuguese: Castelo de Valongo) is a well-preserved medieval castle located in the civil parish of Nossa Senhora de Machede, in the municipality of Évora, Portuguese Évora.

== History ==
Jorge Alarcão, who reproduced an exact plan of the property, cited the Romans as the original founders, but there were few vestiges to support the theory.

Reference to the castle first appears in 1283, from letters of sale between the Infanta D. Leonor Afonso, daughter of King D. Afonso III, discovered by her descendants Pero Anes and D. João Peres Aboim.

There were indications that a tower had existed near the site of the castle. In the 14th century cartulary of the Sé Cathedral of Évora, the primitive tower or castle already existed before the construct of the structure known as the Castelo Velho, located on the opposite bank of Ribeira da Valongo on the margins of Alcorovisca. It was Roman mansion along the road.

Between the 15th and 16th century, the keep tower was repaired and included pointed tiled roofs, staircase brick and bay windows.

In the 19th century, the castle was acquired from the Marquesses of Valada, by their current property-owners.

The cracks and faults in the fortifications were cleaned and repaired in 1989, while the fractures were consolidated and reconstructed.

In November 2004, a map of the sites risk of deterioration and report was elaborated by the DGEMN Direcção Geral dos Edifícios e Monumentos Nacionais (Directorate General for Buildings and National Monuments).

== Architecture ==
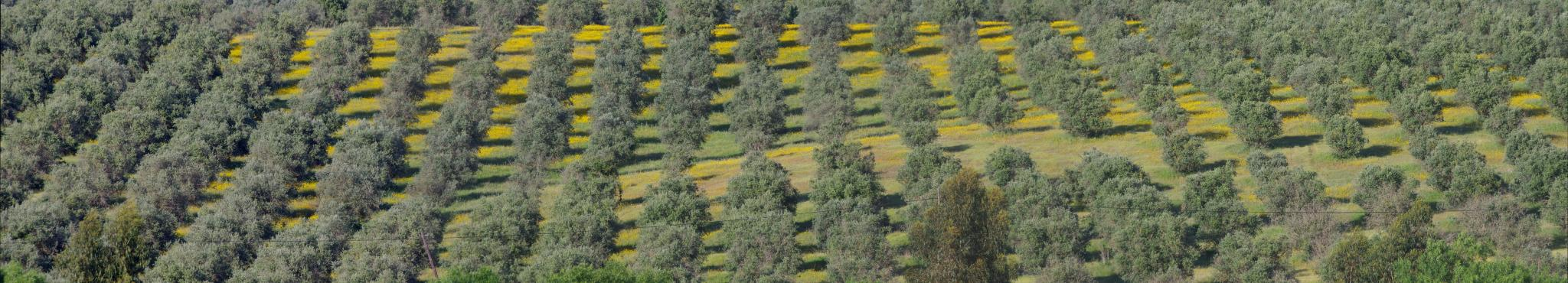
An orchard of olive trees as seen from the castle

The castle is located in a rural area, on an incline over a small platform over a gentle slope 200 metres (660 ft) isolated near the Ribeira de Valongo, an affluent of the Riberira do Degebe. It is circled by cork and holly oak and lands cultivated with wheat and sunflowers, and overlooking the Herdade da Grã (in the southeast) and Herdade de Morjoannes (in the northeast). To the east is the Barragem da Vigia dam and Monte Novo; to the south the lands of olive trees and vineyards of Herdade de Castelo Real; and in the southeast the Monte da Igreja and the old station of Ferro de Valongo.

The rectangular plan is composed by horizontal and orthogonal articulations, with four flights of parapets with four rectangular towers connected to articulations in the northeast, southeast, southwest and northwest. The ceilings are of varying heights, with battlements defined by the contours of the relief.

The principal facade, marked by a large portico with arched doorway exposed to the east, with a keep tower located in the northeast and corbel in the southeast. The remaining facades are marked by narrow cracks and parapets with corbels along their angles. The keep tower is oriented towards the west with its gate accessible by staircase.

The interior consists of three floors with ogival vaults, the last with battlement, supporting three large halls, illuminated by narrow openings. A staircase wraps around the keep, with an emphasis on the southwest.
