= Castelo de Veiros =

Castle in Portugal

Coordinates: 38.9524924°N 7.5082671°W

Castelo de Veiros is a castle in Portugal. It is classified by IGESPAR as a Site of Public Interest.
