= Castelo de Nisa =

Portuguese castle

Coordinates: 39°31′03″N 7°38′59″W

Castelo de Nisa is a castle in Portugal. It is classified as a National Monument.
