= Castle of Sernancelhe =

Medieval castle in Sernancelhe, Viseu, Portugal

Coordinates: 40.90076853592681°N 7.494832707960103°W

The Castle of Sernancelhe (Portuguese: Castelo de Sernancelhe) is a medieval castle in the civil parish of Sernancelhe e Sarzeda, municipality of Sernancelhe, in the Portuguese district of Viseu.

== History ==
Archaeological evidence suggest that early human occupation of the site dates back to the Neolithic era. It later saw occupation under the Romans. In popular myths, local legends persist about the castle being a site of struggles between Christians and Moors dating to the Christian Reconquest of the Iberian Peninsula.

Built by the Knights Hospitaller, the medieval castle is built in granite stone. It now lies in ruins. Although not classified and not appear in the current tourist itineraries of the City Council, it has remaining ensured survival of its castellated walls. Visitors can enjoy the "House of the Father," which is her neighbor.

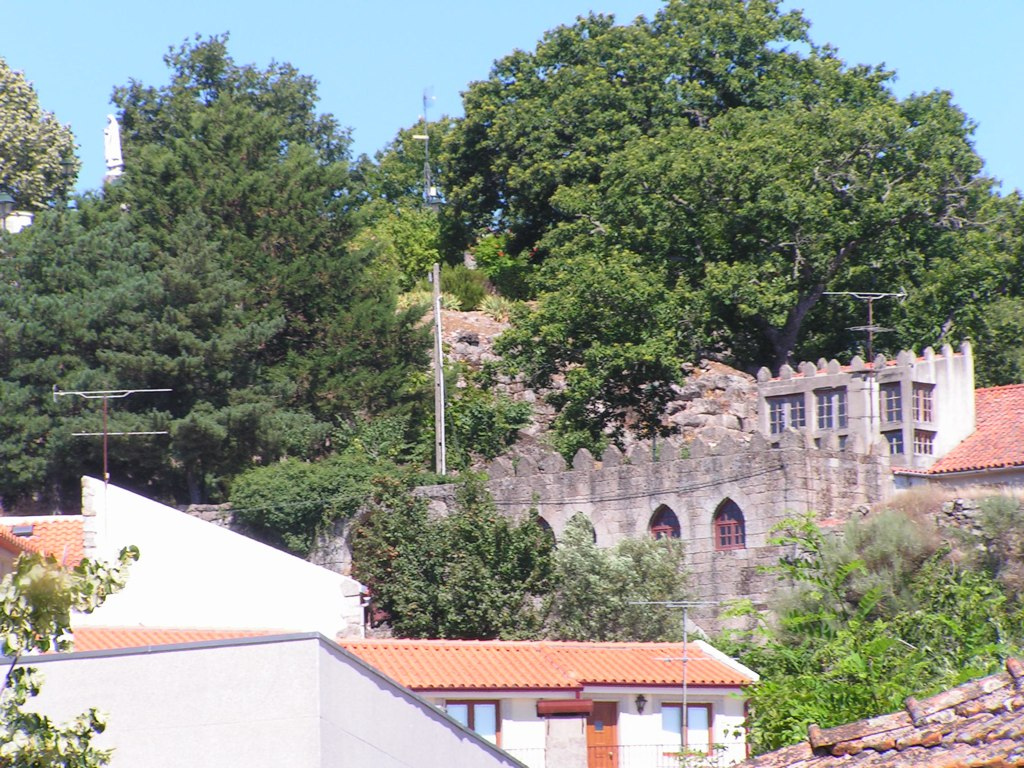
