= Castle of Redondos =

Medieval castle in Portugal

- Castelo de Redondos
- Coimbra, Baixo Mondego, Centro in Portugal
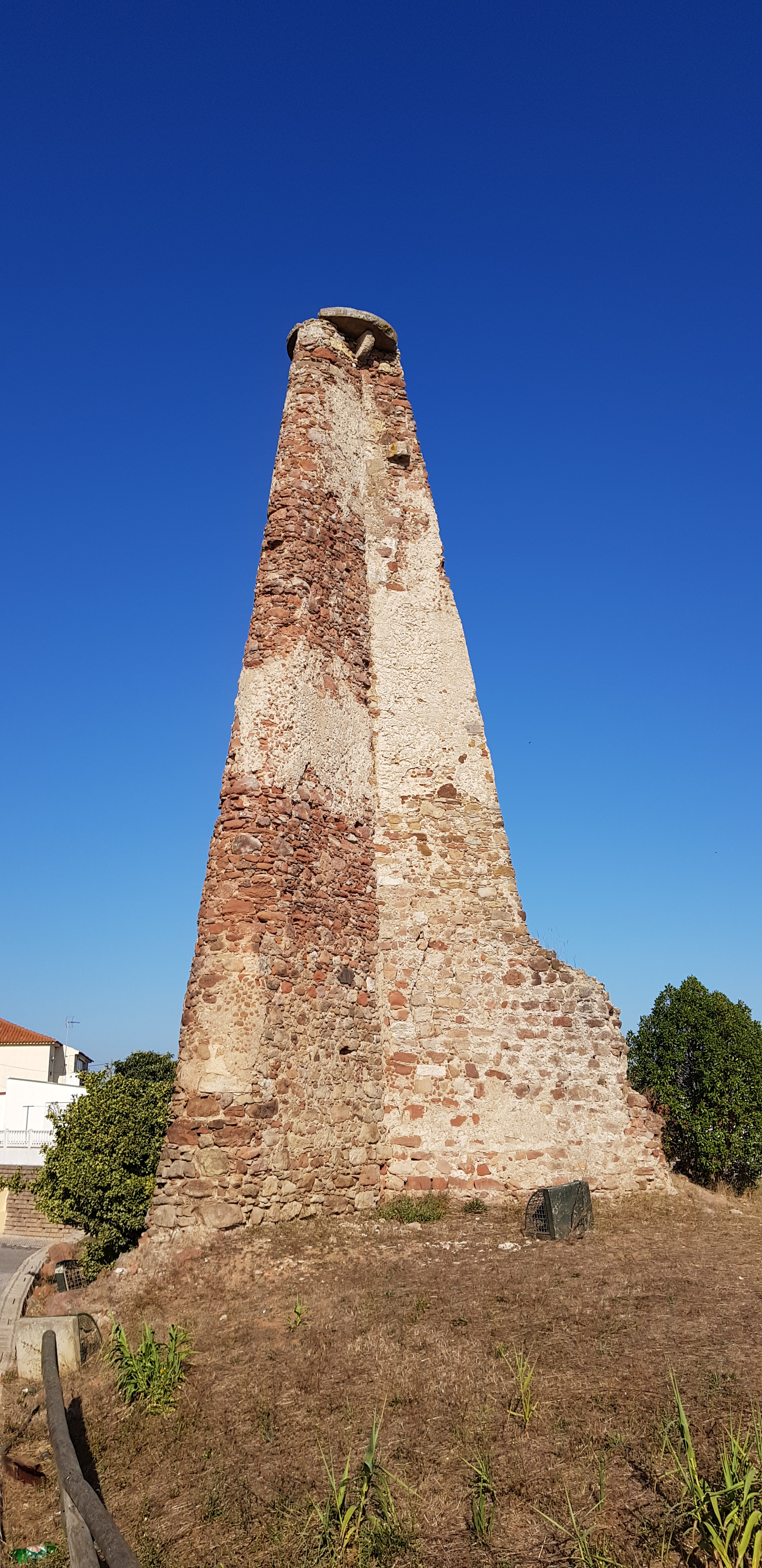
- The remains of the tower of Redondos

Site information
- Type: Castle
- Owner: Portuguese Republic
- Open to the public: Public

Location
- Coordinates: 40°10′00.4″N 8°52′37.5″W

Site history
- Built: 15th century
- Materials: Masonry, Mortar

The Castle of Redondos (Portuguese: Castelo de Redondos/Torre de Redondos) is a medieval castle located in the civil parish of Buarcos, in the municipality of Figueira da Foz, Portuguese Coimbra.

== History ==
The oldest reference to a tower on the site, remotes to 1096, part of the donation made by Abbey Pedro to the Sé Cathedral of Coimbra. The donation was signed by Afonso Henriques, and included two towers over battlements used to defend the anchorage of Buarcos (at the mouth of the Mondego River) from pirates.

In 1256, there was notice that João Retundo was ordered to present himself to the master of Eimdie at the castle.

During the 13th century, in one of the property-rolls of the Monastery of Santa Cruz in Coimbra, the tower of Buarcos was referenced (ar habent torrem de buarcos cum as vinea).

In the book of the estates and land rents received by the University of Coimbra around 1579, the Castle of Buarcos was referenced as an important defensive tower fort.

In the 16th century, it was referred to as the Torre de Cima da Igreja (Tower above the Church) or Torre do Mosteiro de Santa Cruz (Tower of the Monastery of Santa Cruz), distinguishing it from the Torre de Baixo or Torre de Gonçalo Pryvado.

In 1697, D. Leonardo de Santo Agostinho donated the alcaldia to her nephew Pedro Viegas de Novais.

Yet, with the construction of the fortress of Buracos, the castle lost most of its strategic importance. In the information related to the rights of the Monastery of Santa Cruz in the village of Redondos, in 1788, the tower was mentioned. Carlos Van Zeller and Count Raczynski referred to the tower and fortifications were already in a state of ruin.

On 30 October 1854, by decision of the Ministério das Obras Públicas (Ministry of Public Works), the castle was ordered demolished, even as the corner of the tower was saved and repaired, by hydrographic engineer Francisco Maria Pereira da Silva, to serve as a symbol of maritime history, and as a geodesic/topographic marker of the kingdom.

== Architecture ==
The remains of the tower of Redondos is situated at the junction between the Road de Santa Cruz and Rua do Castelo, at the top of the hill. Located in an urban area, the remnants of this tower is encircled by older homes, and delimited by a protective wall.
