= Castle of Terena =

Castle in Terena, Alandroal, Portugal

Coordinates: 38°37′18″N 7°24′26″W

- Castelo de Terena
- Évora, Alentejo Central, Alentejo in Portugal
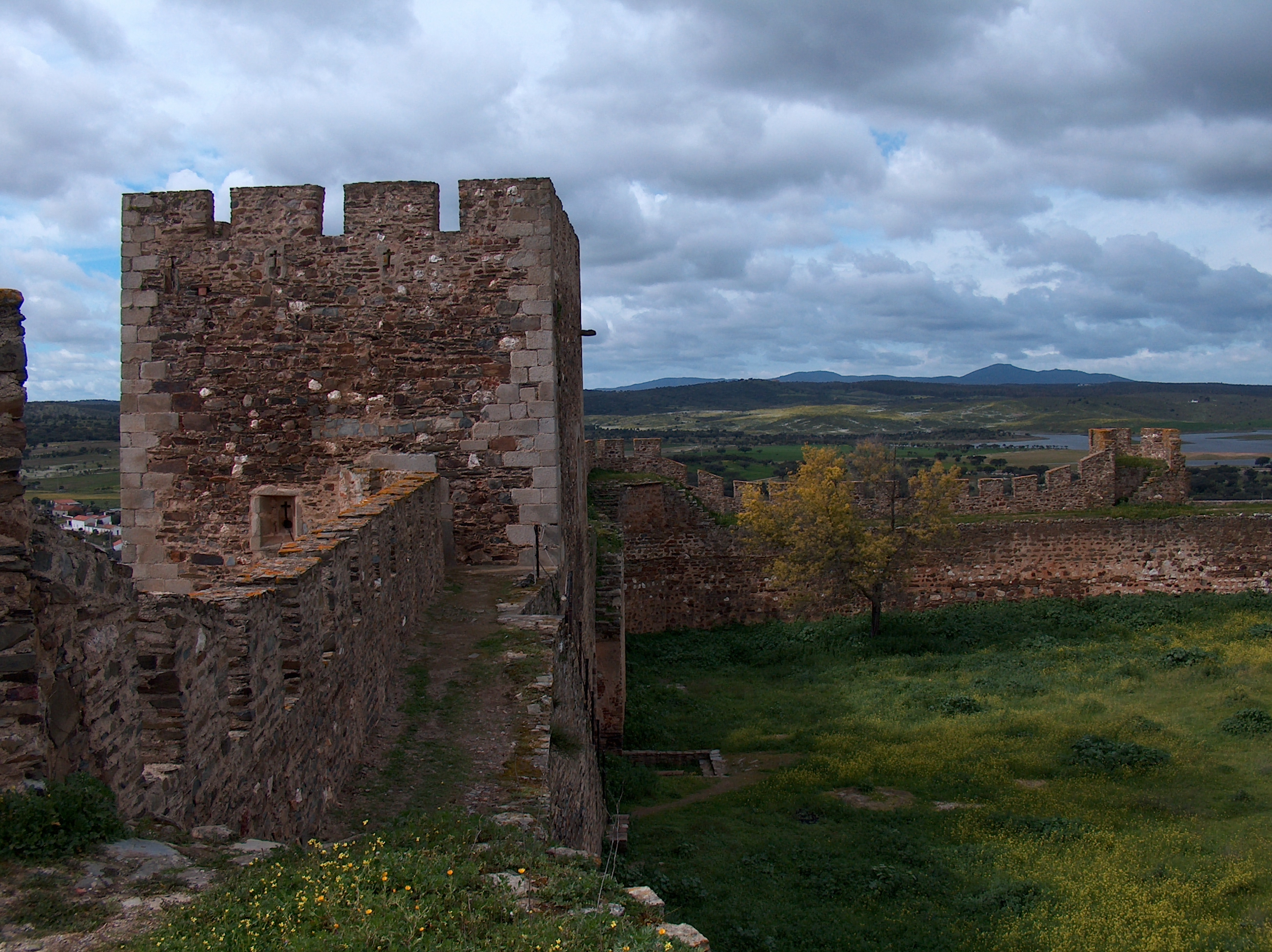
- Portion of the Keep and walls of the Castle of Terena

Site information
- Type: Castle
- Owner: Portuguese Republic
- Operator: DRC Alentejo (Dispatch 829/2009; DR, Série 2/163, 24 August 2009)
- Open to the public: Public

Site history
- Built: c. 1262
- Materials: Stone masonry, Brick, Tiles, Wood

The Castle of Terena is a castle in the civil parish of Terena in the municipality of Alandroal in the Portuguese subregion of Alentejo Central. Since 1946, it has been listed as a National monument.

== History ==
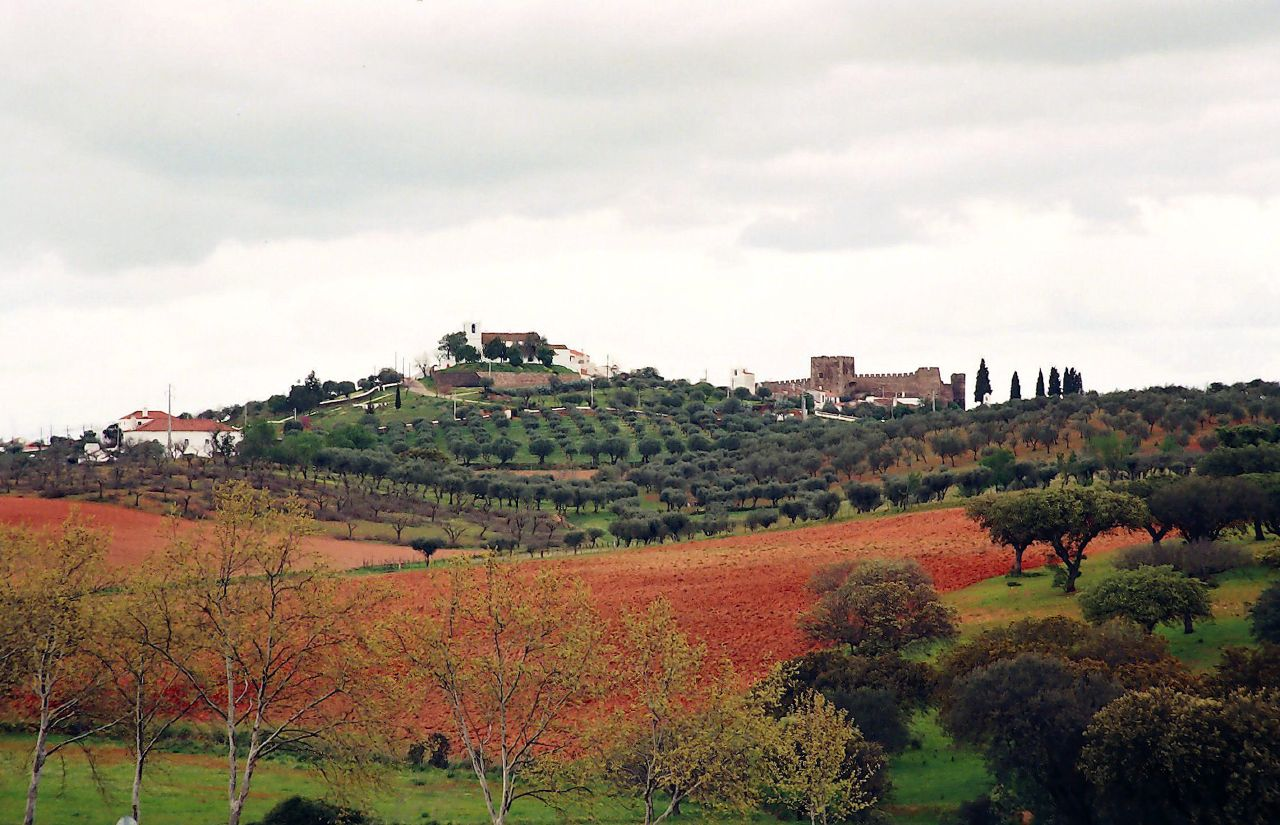
The Castle of Terena on the elevated terrain of the parish of Terena, near the Church of Nossa Senhora da Boa Nova

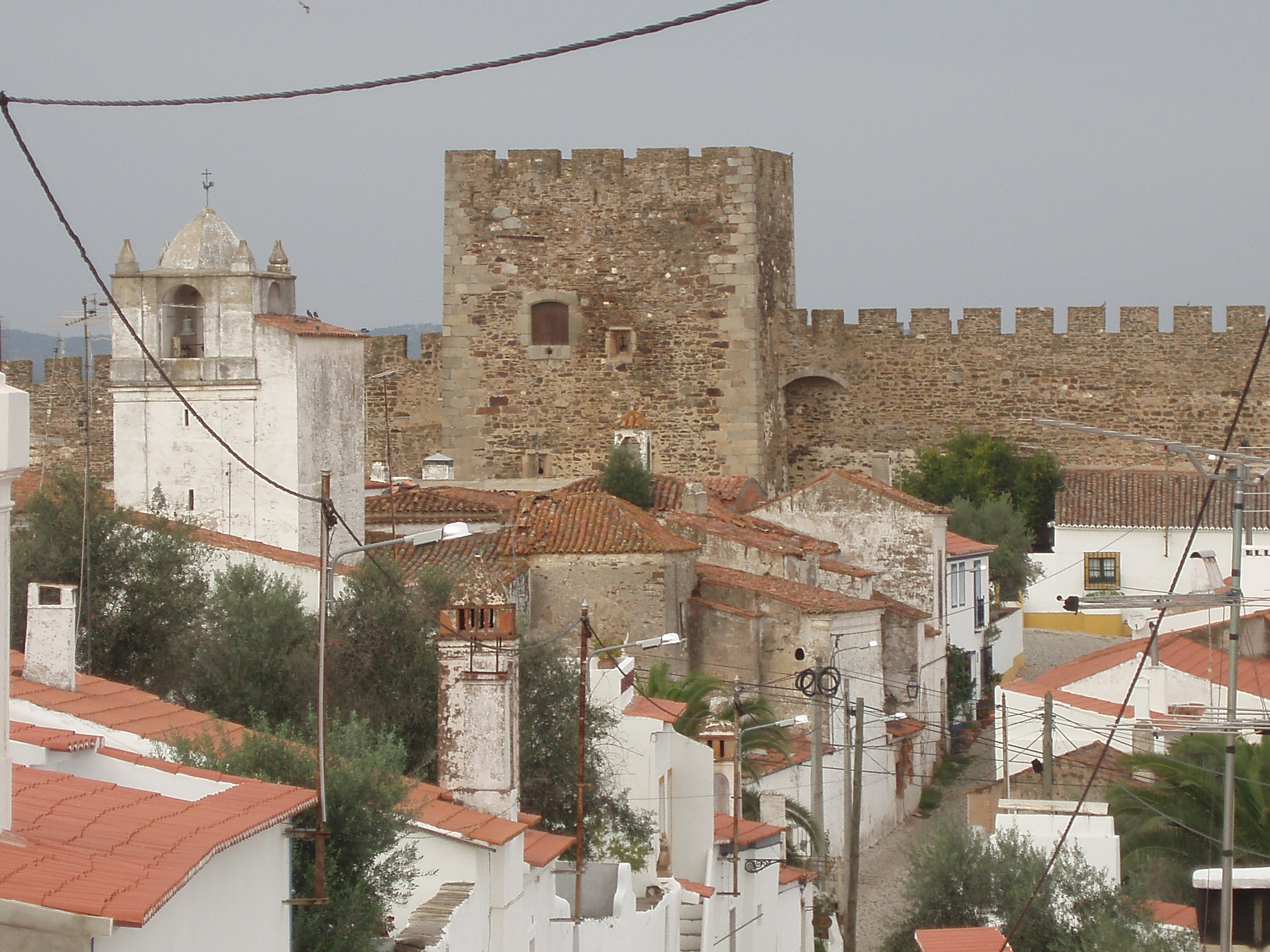
The parapets of the Castle, seen from the skyline of the parish

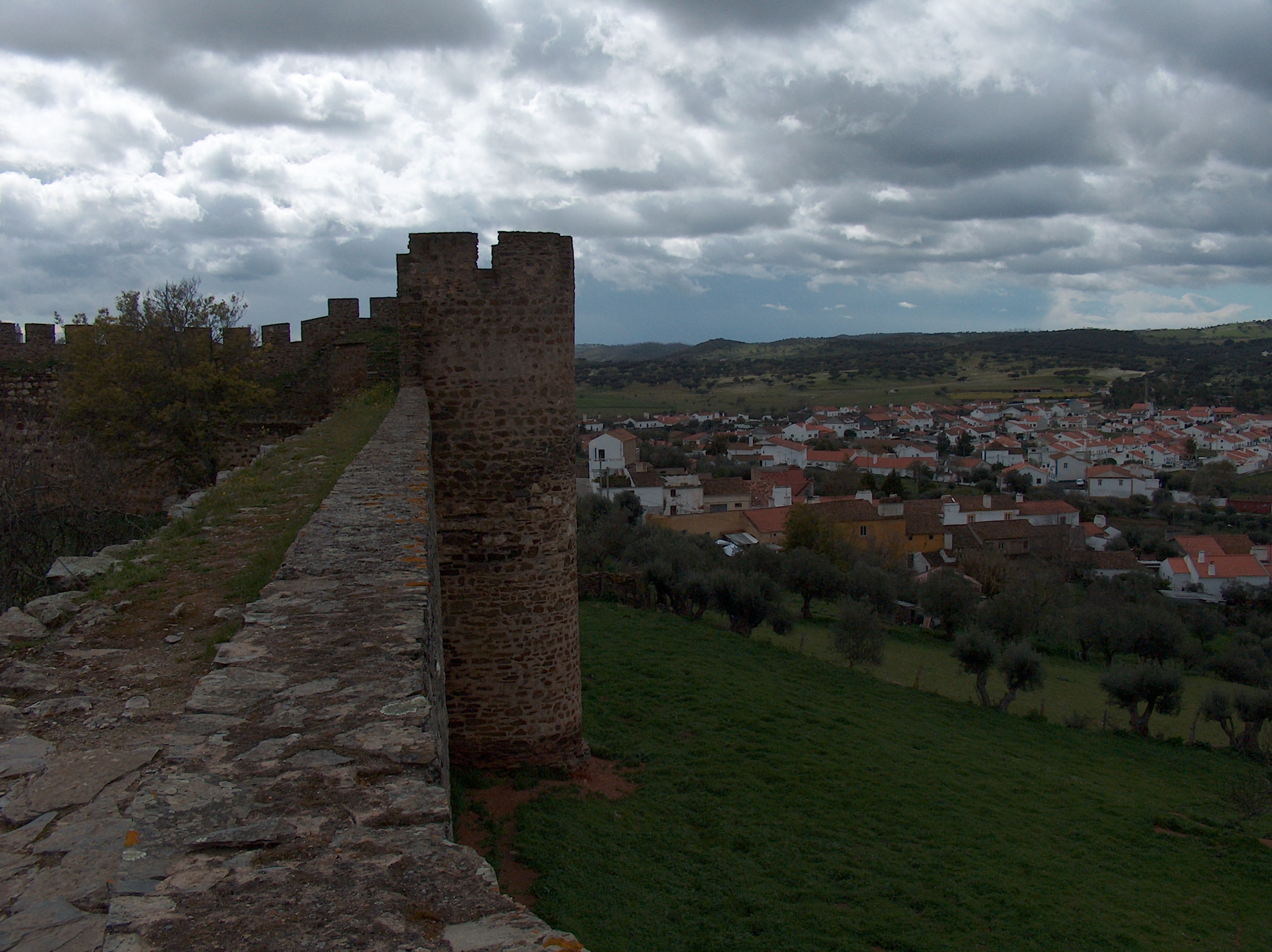
One of the semi-circular towers facing the town

The origins of the castle are found in the period of the early Middle Ages, specifically in the 13th century, a period in which the high Guadiana was a frontier territory with Castile. The earliest registers indicated that a foral was passed by royal knight Gil Martins and his wife, D. Maria João in 1262. It is unclear whether, after this charter, the construction of the structure was begun. Owing to the interest of King Denis to consolidate his kingdom's frontiers, the castle was part of a course of fortresses that included Castle of Elvas, Castle of Juromenha and Castle of Alandroal. Another perspective suggests that the castle was actually constructed in the 15th century, during the reign of King John I of Portugal. This hypothesis is founded in the donation of the town of Terena to the Order of São Bento de Avis, which could have been the impetus for the site to be renovated from a previous garrison (although it highly dubious). By 1380, the castle and its barbican was already identified, indicating clearly that the fortress was under construction.

In 1482, King John II named Nuno Martins da Silveira as alcalde and, in the first decades of the 16th century, this redoubt was amplified during public works, that left behind several visible structures. What is clear, is that a considerable portion of the structure survived from the 14th century.

Remodeled in 1509, the architect Duarte d' Armas reoriented the entranceway through the keep tower, and erected two towers on either side of this structure.

A new foral was issued in 1512 by King Manuel I of Portugal. A couple of years later, the keep tower was remodelled again, this time by Francisco de Arruda, who altered the systems of access: he constructed a barbican, that forced the visitor to follow a path that was less direct to the main road.

In 1652, the castle was occupied and then sacked by Castilian forces commanded by the Duke of S. German. During the Portuguese Restoration War, workers completed alterations to the garrison, constructing a gate towards Spain, between two turrets.

The courtyard of the castle was damaged during the events of the 1755 Lisbon earthquake, although there is no evidence that it was restored, as by that time it had already become abandoned.

=== Republic ===
On 13 January 1979, the castle was ceded to the Junta de freguesia de Terena.

Various points along the walls were restored, and portions reconstructed along the castle's flanks, along with the establishment of the staircase in 1937.

In 1970, the masonry was retouched, and repairs were completed on the walls. Among the changes were repairs made in cement, that included the re-plastering of the vaulted ceiling in the tower keep. The following year the walls were, once again, repaired, this time including the merlons, while masonry and repairs to the gate were completed in 1977.

Within a decade similar projects would occurring in 1981–82, 1984–85, 1986 and 1987, that included work on the walls, staircase, vaulted ceiling, doors and windows, in addition to the construction of a wooden staircase (to access the tower) and landscaping.

== Architecture ==
The castle is located in a rural part of Terena, over a pronounced hilltop overlooking the town, dominating the extreme edge of the ravine and reservoir of Lucefece and surrounding landscape. The Castle lies in the vicinity of the sanctuaries of Endovélico and Church of Nossa Senhora da Boa Nova.

It is an irregular pentagon, flanked by four semi-circular towers and three angular bastions. The rectangular keep or prison tower, approximately two storeys in height, has several vaulted compartments that are lit by cruciform slits in the walls. A rectangular barbican, with Roman arched gate that includes adarve. The castle is accessible from three gates: the Traitors' Gate and the Gate of the Sun (which was obstructed since the Restoration Wars) and the village gate (the main entrance), which is protected by the barbican.
