= Castle of Campo Maior =

Medieval military fortification in Portugal

- Castelo de Campo Maior
- Portalegre, Alentejo, Alentejo in Portugal
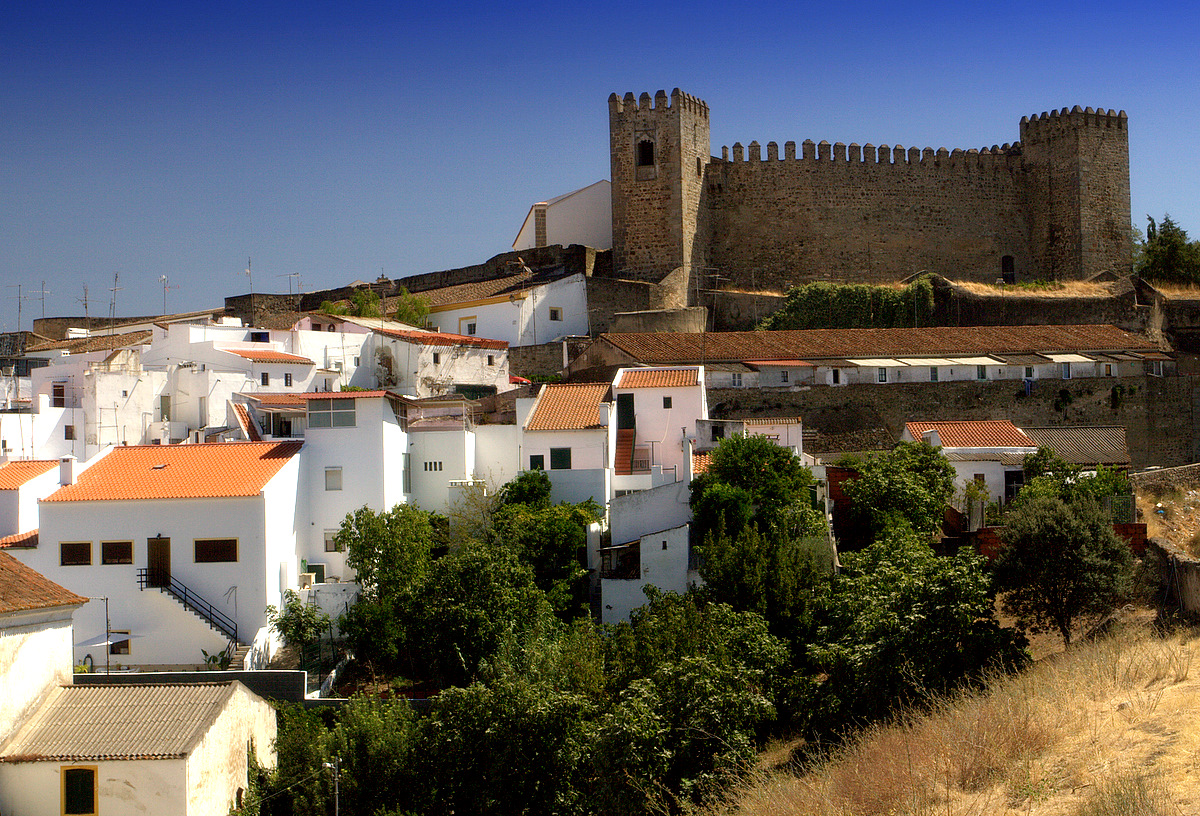
- The castle and the small houses around its hilltop flanks

Site information
- Type: Castle
- Owner: Portuguese Republic
- Operator: DRC Alentejo (Ordinance 829/2009; DR, Série II (163), 24 August 2009)
- Open to the public: Public

Location
- Coordinates: 39°0′39.80″N 7°4′19.37″W

Site history
- Built: c. 1230
- Materials: Quartzite, granite, schist, tile, calcium oxide mortar, stone, clay

The Castle of Campo Maior (Portuguese: Castelo de Campo Maior) is a medieval military fortification, in the civil parish of São João Bapista, municipality of Campo Maior, part of a first line of defense in the Portuguese Alentejo, oriented towards Spain, in conjunction with the military forts of Ouguela, Elvas, Olivença and Juromenha. It is a walled bulwark of the modern era, highlighted by a Renaissance-era window in the northern tower of the castle. It has been listed as a National monument since 1911.

== History ==
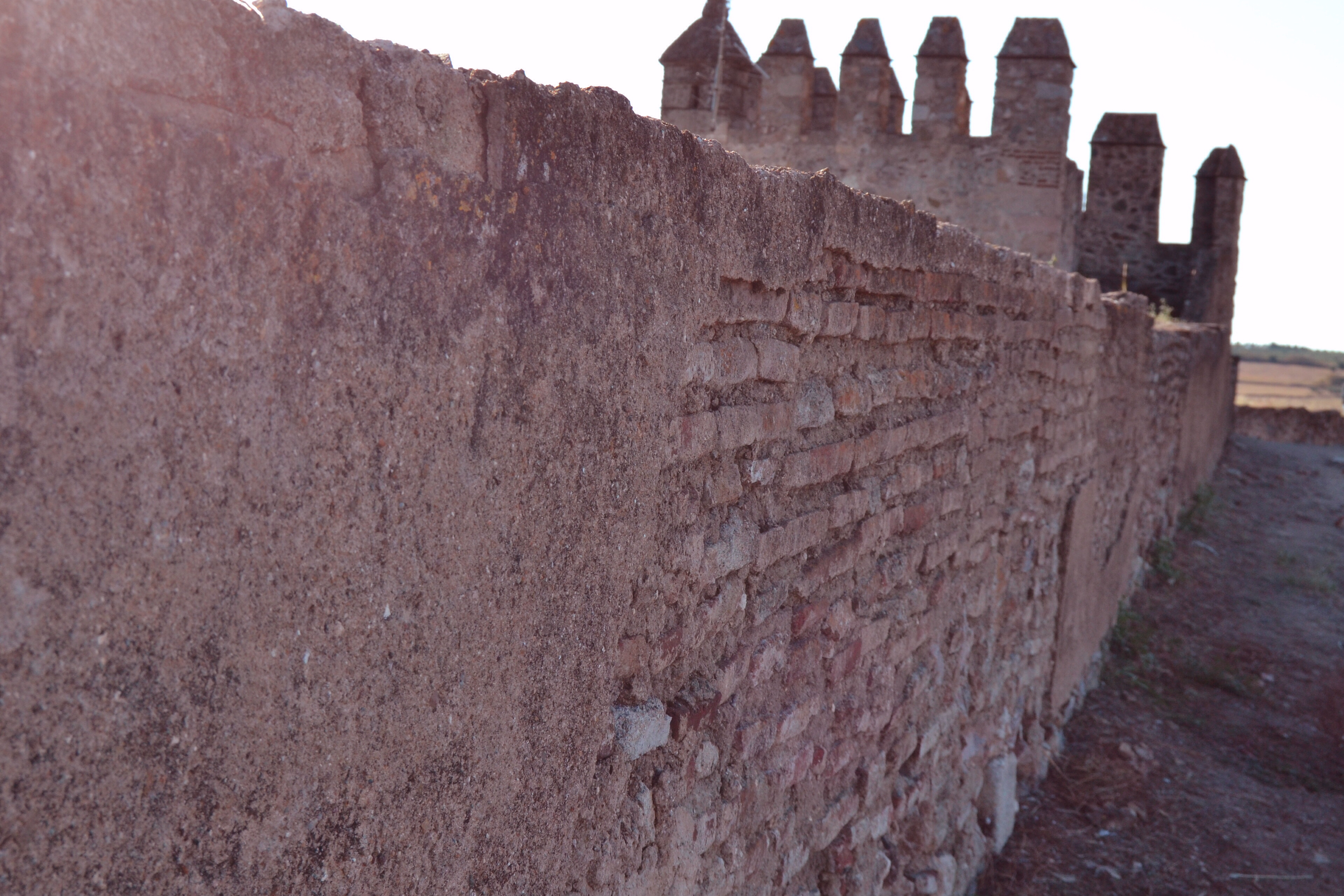
The walls of the citadel on the hilltop of Outeiro de Santa Vitória

Owing the regions occupation by successive tribes of Celts, Romans and Muslims, it is likely that the territory of Campo Maior has been settled during the pre-historic epochs. The land of Campo Maior was definitively conquered from the Moors by the forces of Kingdom of León in 1230. The first foral (charter) was issued by the Bishop of Badajoz thirty years after this event.

Eventually, the castle was conquered by the Portuguese in 1295-1296, and integrated into the national territory in 1297, under the Treaty of Alcanizes. In order to maintain the peace between Spain and Portugal, King Denis ordered the reconstruction of the fortress in 1310, oriented toward his Iberian rivals. These fortifications were extended and rehabilitation during the 15th and 16th century completed, during the reigns of his successors John and Manuel, designed by Duarte d'Armas.

=== Kingdom ===
Around 1640, following the Portuguese Restoration War, King John IV established a Counsel of War that formed their territory into military provinces: Minho, Trás-os-Montes, Beira, Estremadura, Alentejo and Algarve. Therefore, following the decision of John IV, work began in 1645 under the supervision of João Cosmander to reconstruct the bulwarks. Between 17th and 18th century the fortification was adapted for the time, obtaining the bulwarks and secondary walls, in addition to the installation of permanent military storehouses, stables and barracks. After 1644, many of the reconstruction of the fortress was handled by Nicolau de Langres. A document, dated 14 May 1647, identified Langres as the military engineer of the project, while requesting material for the construction of military square, in addition to the arms necessary to protect the castle and its surrounding territory. In 1662, Luís Serrão Pimentel continued work on the walls.

On 22 May 1680, D. Peter, acting as regent, ordered Mateus do Couto, D. Diogo Pardo and António Rodrigues to Campo Maior, in order to verify the work being done on the citadel, under the plans of Luís Serrão Pimentel.

During the Spanish War of Succession, in 1712, the square was besieged by Spanish forces and defended in the main square.

In 1732, an explosion in powder magazine (caused by thunderstorms) resulted in the destruction of the castle and surrounding walls of the old town around 3:00 in the morning; the space was totally levelled, and many of the homes around the walls were destroyed. At the time of the explosion, the magazine held 90,000 kilograms (200,000 lb) of gunpowder and 5000 munitions; the violent explosion resulted in a fire that, in addition to the direct deaths, consumed almost half of the town's homes. The powder magazine was reconstructed by order of John V of Portugal in 1735, under the meticulous care of Manuel de Azevedo Fortes. On 2 July 1736, Diogo Lopes de Sepúlveda was awarded the commission to the post of Sergeant-Major, as part of his efforts in reconstructing the square after these events.

But, in 1762, Spanish forces, once again, invaded the territory (during the Seven Years' War) and met the Portuguese in Campo Maior.

=== Peninsular wars ===
During the Peninsular War, during the Battle of the Oranges (Portuguese: Guerra das Laranjas), Portuguese forces capitulated in 1810. After a small victory, these forces recapitulated in 1811.

=== 20th century ===
On 18 March 1911, the structure was classified as a national monument by Decree. In the first half of the 1940s, the Direcção-Geral dos Edifícios e Monumentos Nacionais (DGEMN) began works to restore the group of structures. A second phase of construction was begun in the 1960s, and extended into the 1970s, marked by interventions in the castle walls and the Chapel of Nossa Senhora dos Aflitos. A third phase of reconstruction began in the latter part of the 1980s, when the castle and walls repaired, just before the castle became the responsibility of the Instituto Português do Património Arquitectónico (IPPAR), on 1 June 1992, Decree-law 106F/92.

Owing to bad weather in 2010, the castle walls were partially destroyed.

== Architecture ==
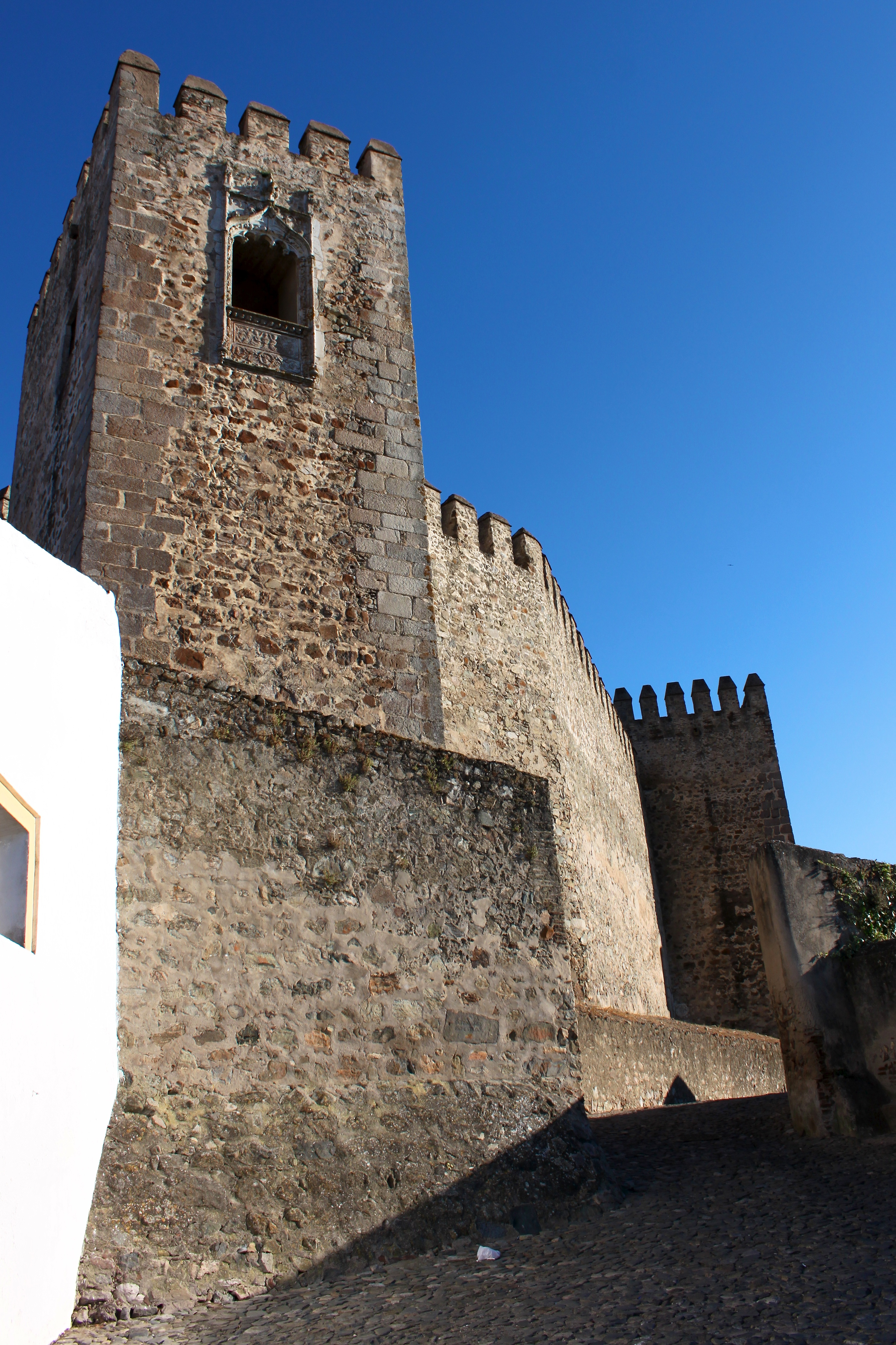
The northern tower and walls of the citadel

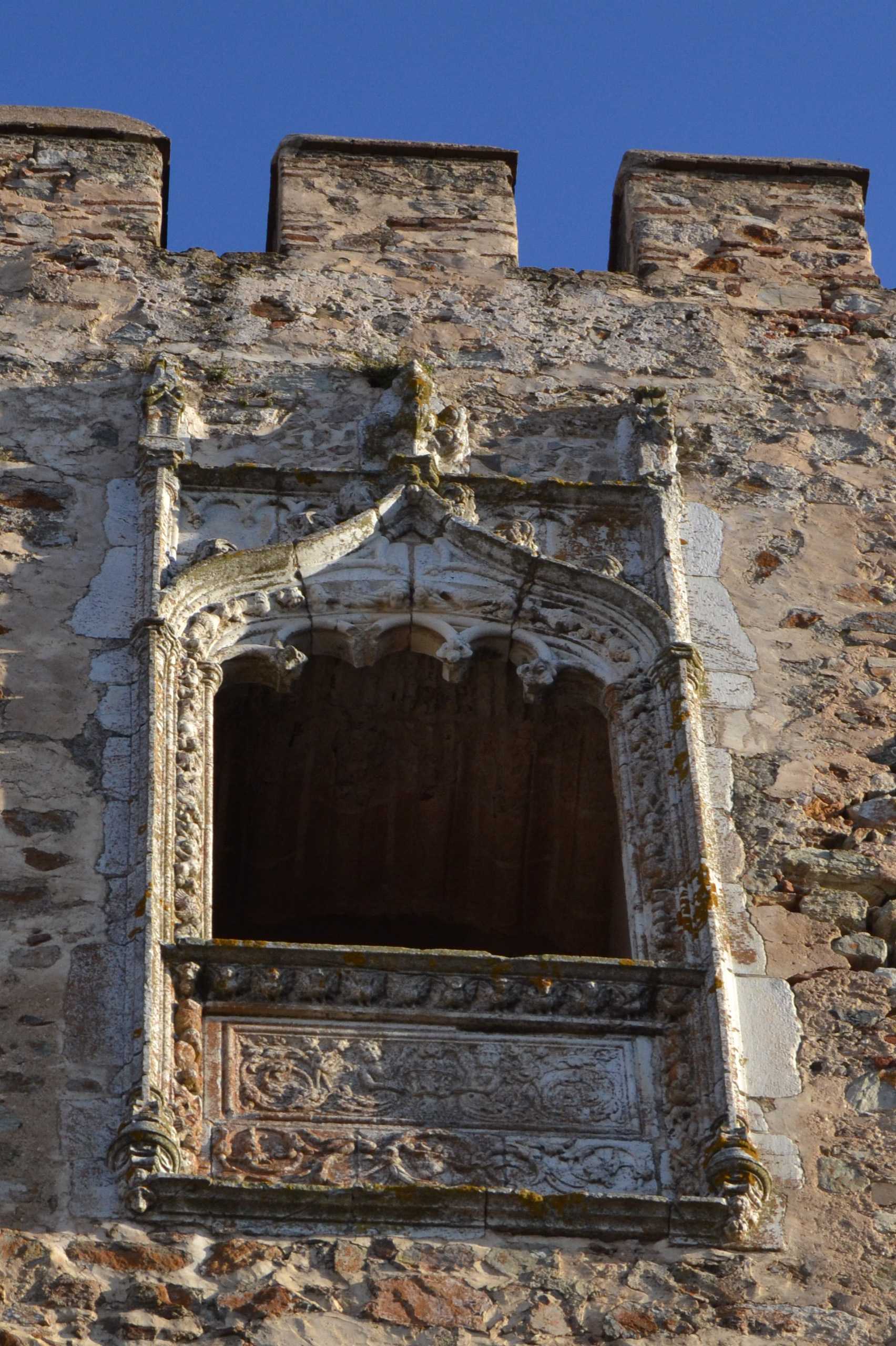
Detail of the Renaissance window of the northern tower

The castle is located in an urban context, is walls encircling the area known as Outeiro de Santa Vitória, the top of which is the castle, 299 metres (981 ft) in altitude, transformed into a citadel with bulwark fortifications. It is positioned, 10 kilometres (6.2 mi) from the Spanish frontier and 18 kilometres (11 mi) from Badajoz and Elvas (areas that are visible from its towers), the fortress is encircled in the north, northeast, east and southeast by modern buildings and the town is similarly encircled by agricultural lands.

A heavily walled fortification, formed of a ten-sided polygon curtain of walls, with some missing facades. The walls, from the south, in a clockwise direction: the bulwark of Boa Vista, middle bulwark of São Sebastião, the gates of the Vila (town), the middle bulwark of Lisbon, middle bulwark of Curral dos Coelhos, bulwark of Santa Cruz, bulwark of Cavaleiro (also referred to as the São João bulwark), the middle bulwark of Príncipe, bulwark of Fonte do Concelho, middle bulwark of São Francisco and middle bulwark of Santa Rosa. The fortification also includes a gap and counterscarp in part of its extension, namely in the south and northeastern parts, as well as four turrets.

A number of military edifices have occupied the spaces within the castle, collectively maintaining several of the existing buildings in some form of use (the warehouses, barracks, stables and living spaces).

The castle retains two of its six original towers, an irregular rectangular space with walls forming a trapezoid space, with battlements and adarve permitting access to the remaining towers. The towers have battlements and walls, terminating in a frusto-pyramidal domes, rounded at the top. Each tower has a vaulted ceiling at the adarve, with the northern tower exemplified by a decorated Renaissance window. To the south, are the walls that circle the old village of Campo Maior, a rough design in the form of an ellipse, with seven towers, six rectangular and one, in the northeast, octagonal, forming the main entrance to the complex. The walls are lower, in order to support barbettes and canon emplacements. One of the towers, in the southwest, along one of the false gates has battlements. To the southeast is, also, the Chapel of Senhor dos Aflitos.

The castle grounds are semi-/permanently occupied by cultural (museum historical and military architecture of Campo Maior); residential (part of the bulwarks occupied by residences, in the middle bulwark of São Sebastião there are gypsy communities); and equipment (part of the bulwarks occupied by storerooms and facilities for breeding of animals, as well as waste disposal).
