= Juromenha =

Portuguese town

Coordinates: 38°44′28″N 7°14′23″W

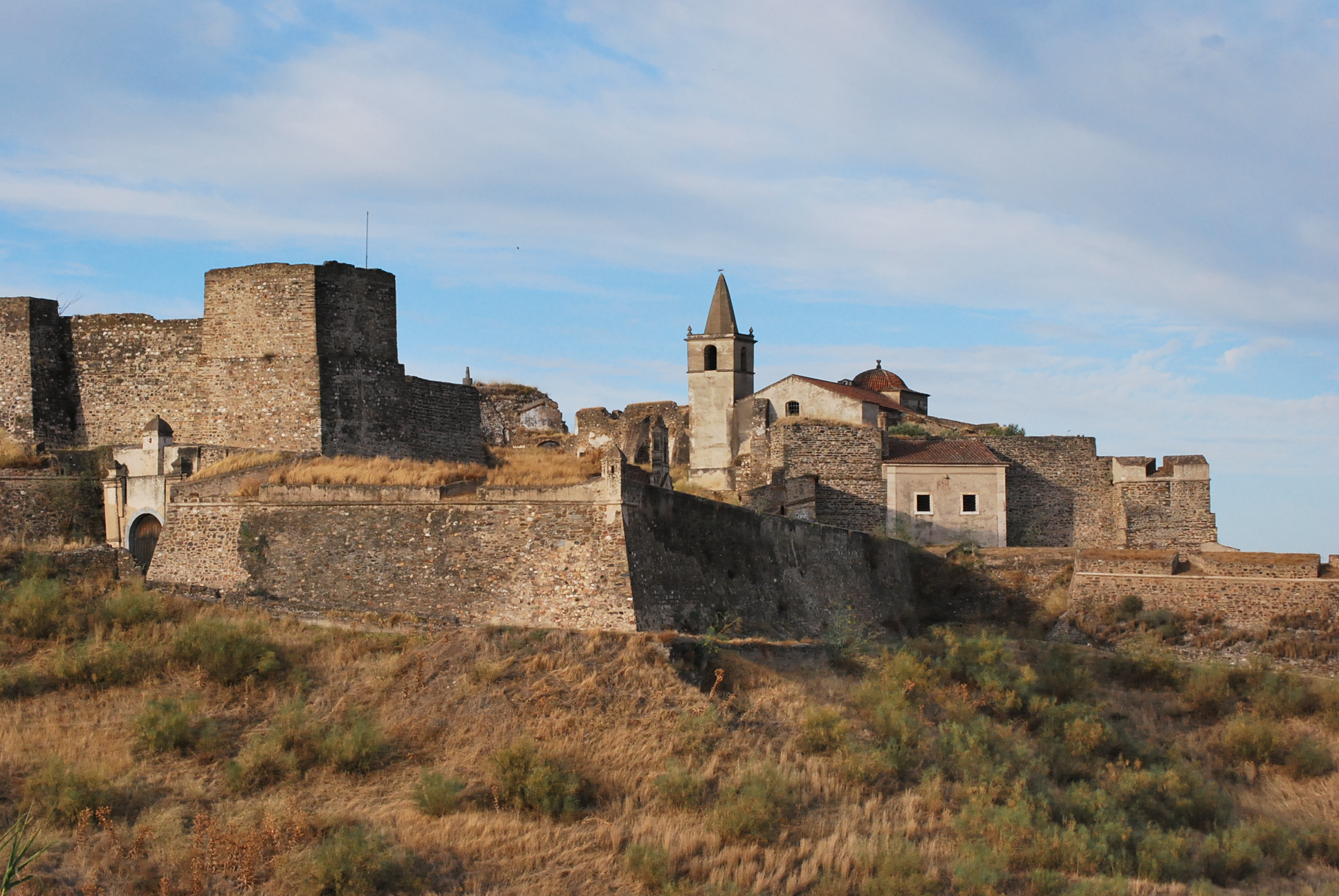
Juromenha, Portugal

Juromenha, officially Nossa Senhora do Loreto de Juromenha, was a freguesia in Alentejo region, southeastern Portugal, near the border with Spain. It was part of Alandroal municipality.

In the 10th century, Ibn Hawqal traveled through the town on his way to Toledo.

On 28 January 2013, it merged with Nossa Senhora da Conceição (Alandroal) and São Brás dos Matos, forming Alandroal, São Brás dos Matos e Juromenha.

== See also ==
- Castle of Juromenha
