= Castle of Elvas =

Medieval military fortification in Elvas, Portugal

- Castelo de Elvas
- Portalegre, Alentejo, Alentejo in Portugal
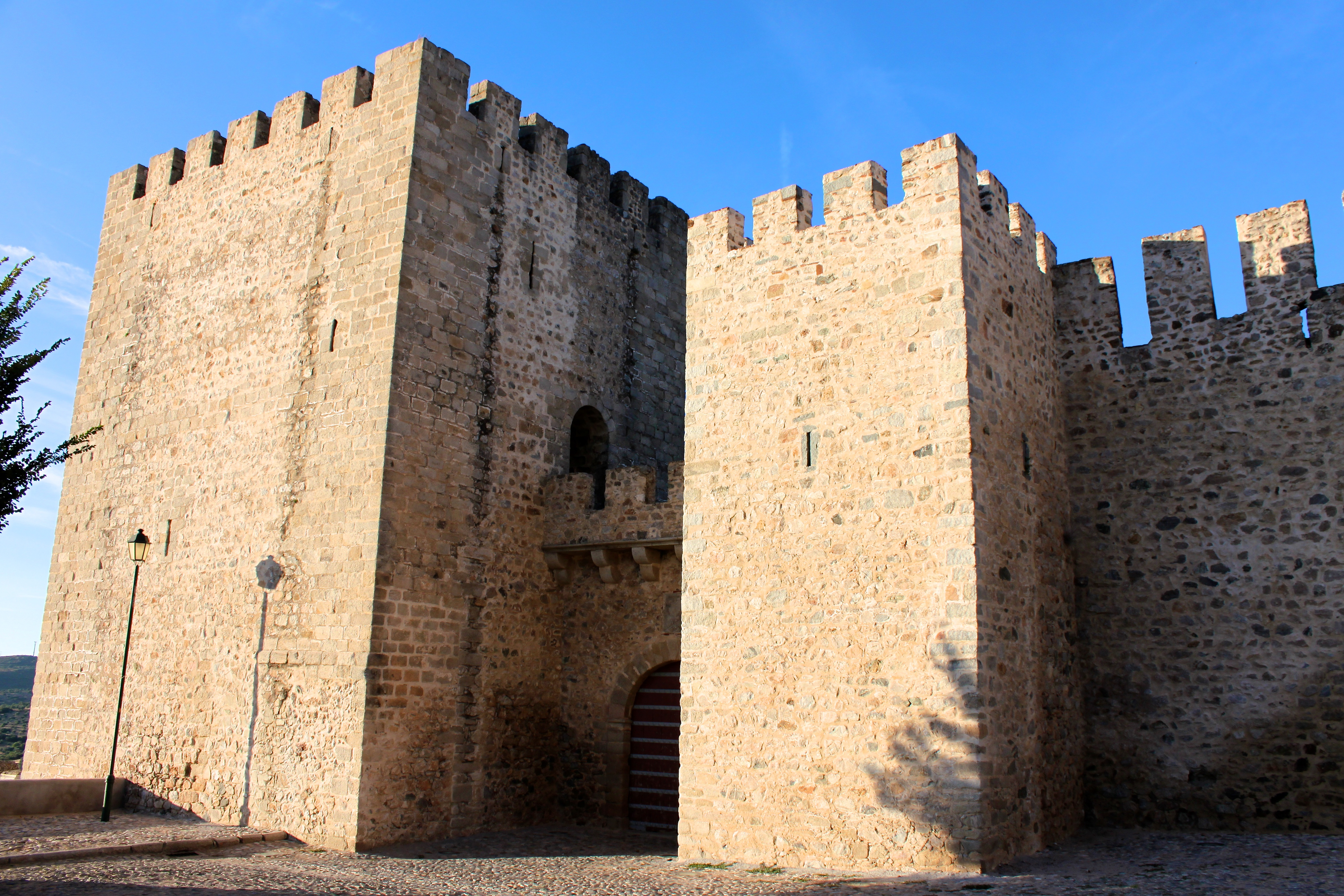
- The main portico of the Castle of Elvas, showing the massive battlements

Site information
- Type: Castle
- Owner: Portuguese Republic
- Open to the public: Public

Location
- Location of the fort within the municipality of Elvas
- Coordinates: 38°53′.75″N 7°9′46.41″W

The Castle of Elvas (Portuguese: Castelo de Elvas) is a medieval military fortification in Portugal, in the civil parish of Alcáçova, municipality of Elvas, part of a first line of defense in the Portuguese Alentejo, in conjunction with the military forts of Ouguela, Campo Maior, Olivença and Juromenha.

== History ==
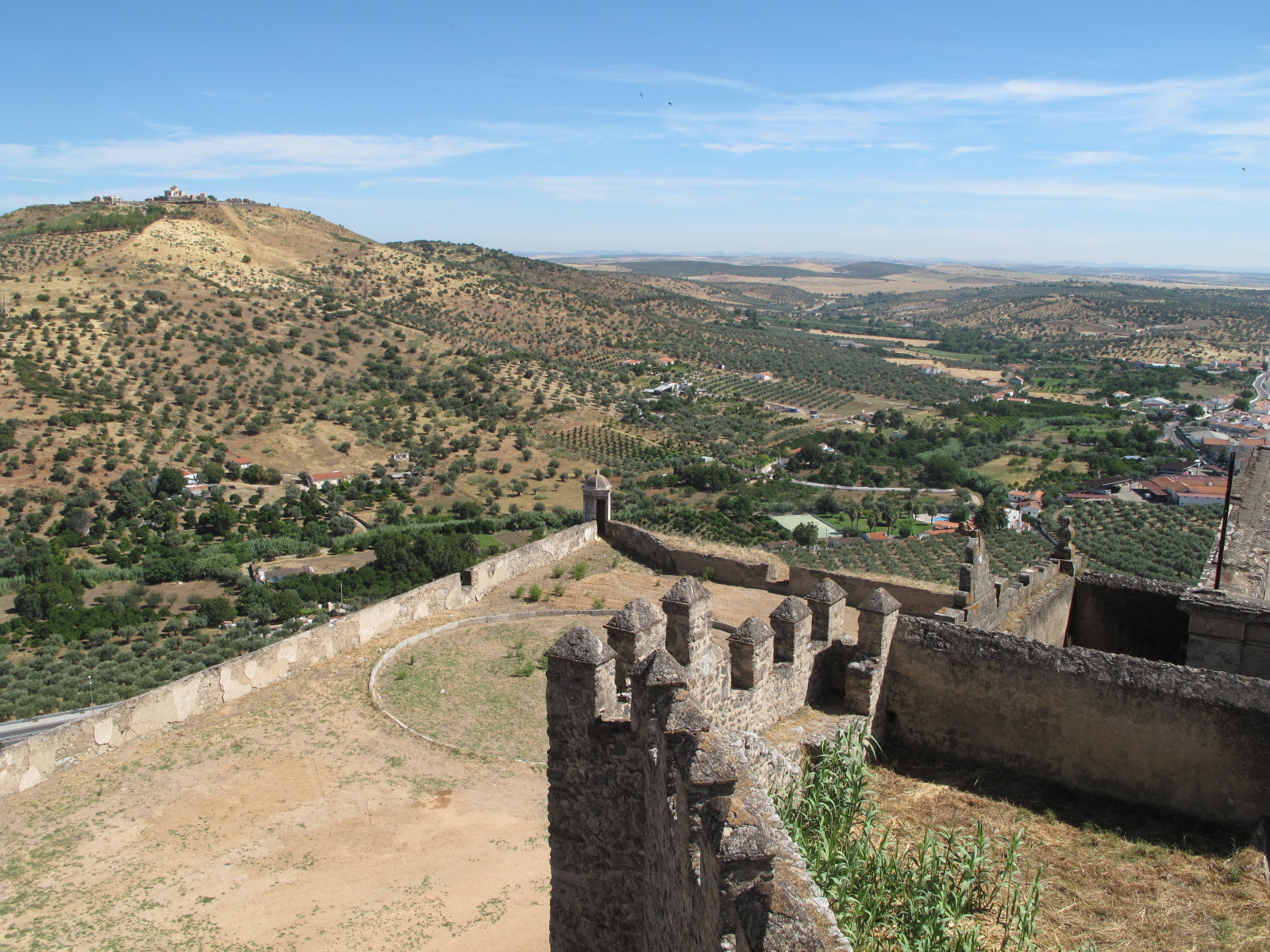
A view from the parapets of the fortress, with a vista toward the Fort of Lippe

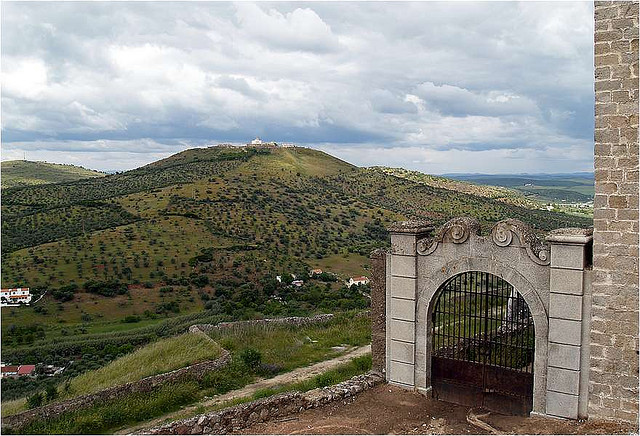
An ornate gate, posterior to the medieval castle

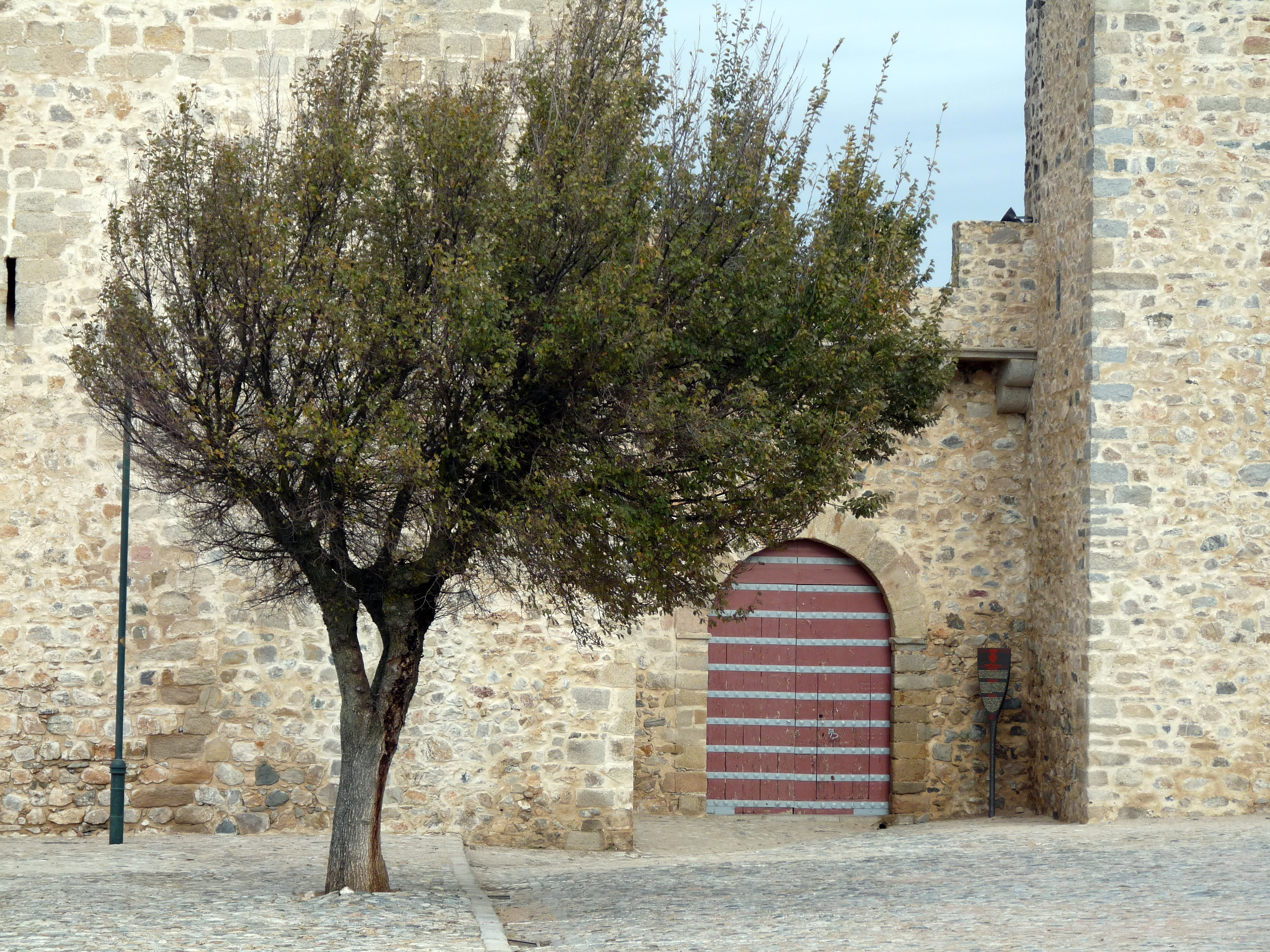
The simple Roman arch gate, the Porta da Vila, providing access into the castle

Between the 8th and 12th century Muslim forces occupied Elvas, resulting in the construction of the fortress. It was briefly conquered by forces loyal to Afonso Henriques around 1166, an action that was repeated in successive years with Moorish capture, and recapture, of the strategic point. In 1200 Sancho I encircled the citadel, and his successor, Sancho II made a tentative attempt to capture Elvas in 1226, at the same time Alfonso IX of León was trying to take Badajoz: although concerted, it was unsuccessful. This was followed in 1228 by another attempt, also unsuccessful, until 1230, after the castle and surrounding territory was abandoned by Muslim forces, who had received word that Alfonso IX had reached and was threatening Mérida.

=== Kingdom ===
The year before (1229) Sancho II had issued a foral (charter) for Elvas, which was later reaffirmed by King Afonso III in 1263. As a method of attracting further Iberian investments the concession of a fair, in 1262, helped to attract settlement to the region. This, along with further investments from the Crown resulted in the reconstruction of the castle and walled village between the 13th and 14th century, with the cerca Fernandina (walls of King Ferdinand), still under the reign of Afonso IV, that included 22 towers and 11 gates (including the important Gate of Olivença or Royal Gate).

Elvas was under siege from 1325 to 1327 from the forces of Alfonso XI of Castile, due to the continuing war during the reign of Afonso IV. This would continue for several years, first with a two-day siege in 1334; in 1337; and then in 1381, by Infante John of Portugal (son of King Peter I of Portugal and Inês de Castro) supported by Castilian forces, during the third protracted wars with Castile, during the reign of King Ferdinand (1381-1383). It was also besieged in 1385, by John II of Castille, during the Restoration Wars (1384-1387).

Following these battles, between 1488 and 1490, the castle underwent reconstruction, with alterations complete to the hexagonal tower, as well as the construction of a keep tower that was much taller and able to support artillery emplacements. Sometime during this period the alcalde's quarters were also renovated, while repairs to the walls and three towers were carried out in intervening years, following acts by Afonso Mendes de Oliveira. In this period, the town had four internal and four external gates, all without doors.

On 3 March 1507 King Manuel I confirmed the foral, already established by Afonso III. Four years later he ordered the construct of several towers along the walls and the repair of two that had already suffered damage. These acts preceded the elevation of Elvas to the status of city (Portuguese: cidade), which he did on 21 April 1513 with the promulgation of a new foral.

The settlement was also elevated to the status of bishopric in 1570.

In 1580, Elvas was occupied, without combat, by D. Sancho de Ávila.

Between 1601 and 1602, under the direction of Luís Serrão Pimentel, the walls were repaired, owing to several years of neglect.

=== Restoration wars ===
In 1641, under the administration of the Governor Matias de Albuquerque, significant repairs were begun on the castle and fortress. This completed through contributions from people of the town, equivalent to two réis, and resulted in the expansion of trenches, reinforcement of the barbicans and the opening-up of a gap for expansion. This was accomplished through the demolition of various homes near the castle to permit the war effort: in 1644, the Marquess of Torrescusa had already proven the need to reinforce Elvas, with his siege of the castle.

This was the beginning of the period of construction that resulted in the bulwarked Praça de Elvas that was completed in 1653, creating a military square and defensive ring. By the middle of this project, records document the nomination, in 1646, of Pedro Fernandes, quartermaster of the Sé of Elvas, and an accomplished expert in fortifications, to assist João Cosmander in the work on the walls.

Between 1658 and 1659, Elvas was encircled by the forces of Luis Méndez de Haro, and the castle's defenders resisted the Spanish bombardment of the town, although many died due to the Black death. This was ultimately a precursor to the 14 January 1659 Battle of the Lines of Elvas, that pitted the Haro's forces against the cobbled-together forces of António Luís de Meneses, 1st Marquis of Marialva, 3rd Count of Cantanhede.

By 1662, the walls and the city's defenses were still being rebuilt, under Luís Serrão Pimentel.

=== War of Spanish Succession ===
After Portugal joined the forces of the Grand Alliance during the War of Spanish Succession, with the Methuen Treaty, it became vulnerable from attacks from Spain. In 1706, Elvas fell under siege from a Franco-Spanish force, and yet again in 1712, when the Marquess of Bay and his forces attempted to seize the castle.

These events led to the post-war construction of a gunpowder magazine in 1735, under the direction and plans of Manuel de Azevedo Fortes.

=== Peninsular War ===
With the intervention of French forces during the Peninsular War Elvas, once again took on the frontlines of the battle between Spain and Portugal. Supported by French forces of Manuel de Godoy, during the campaign known as the Guerra das Laranjas (War of the Oranges), Elvas was attacked by Spanish forces in 1801 however, Godoy was unable to siege the fortress due to insufficient troops and supplies.

During fighting involved with the French campaign, Elvas was taken in 1807 by the French. The following year an Anglo-Portuguese force laid siege to Elvas, prior to the expulsion of French forces, in order to expel the French garrisoned in the castle.

In 1815, one of the towers was demolished in order to protect a warehouse that was located near the wall.

In 1823, battery emplacements were affixed to the northern and northwest towers, that included lowering of emplacements, but also the construction of barbettes.

=== 20th century ===
Between 1940 and 1948, a large intervention was made on the site, that altered many of the spaces. During these renovations, an azulejo tile depicting the Sagrada Família, on the castle gate, was removed.

On 1 June 1992, the property was placed under the management of the IPPAR, under Decree 106F/92.

== Architecture ==
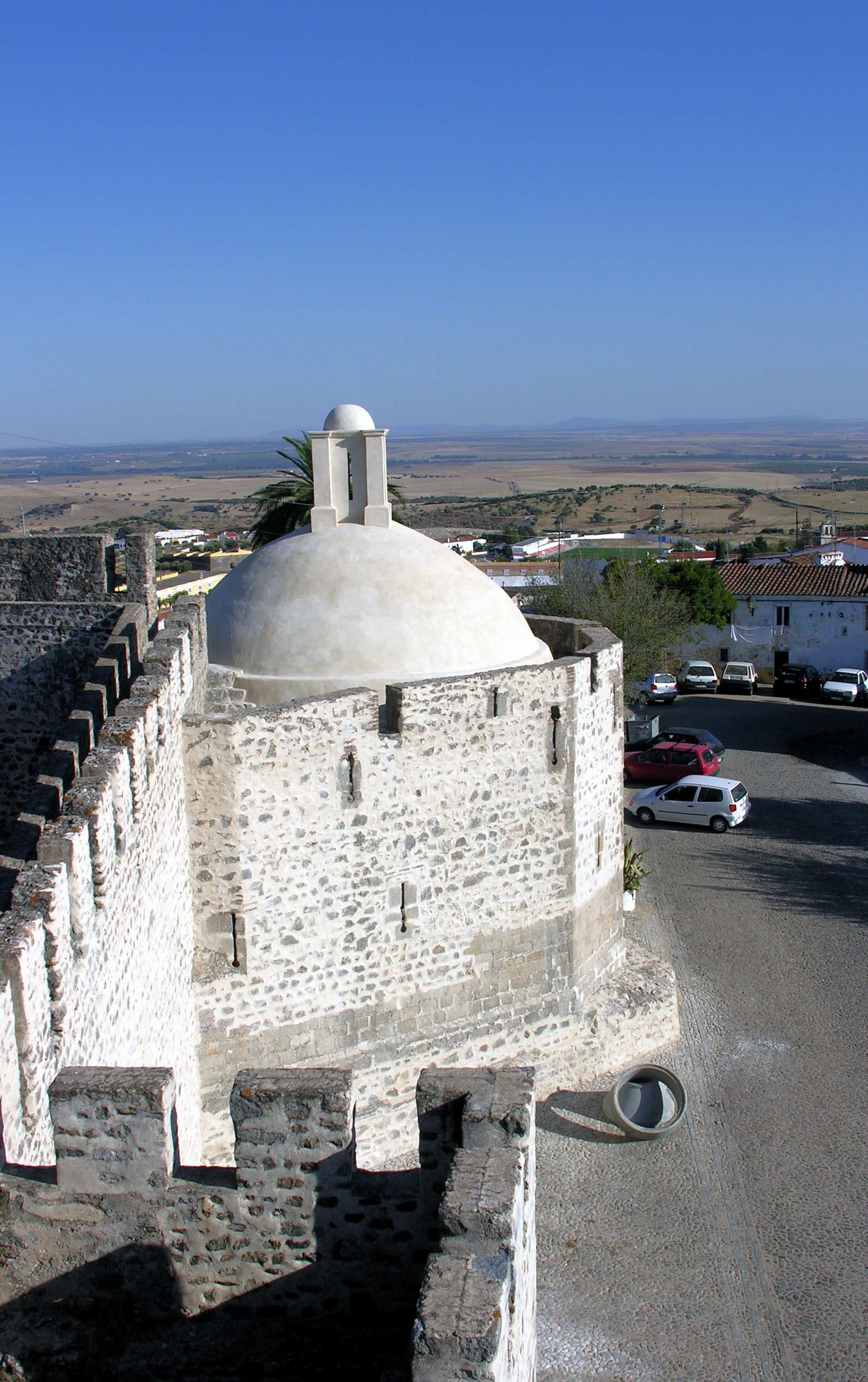
Along the southwest battlement is the two-storey tower with 12 arrowslits, posterior capped by a vaulted ceiling

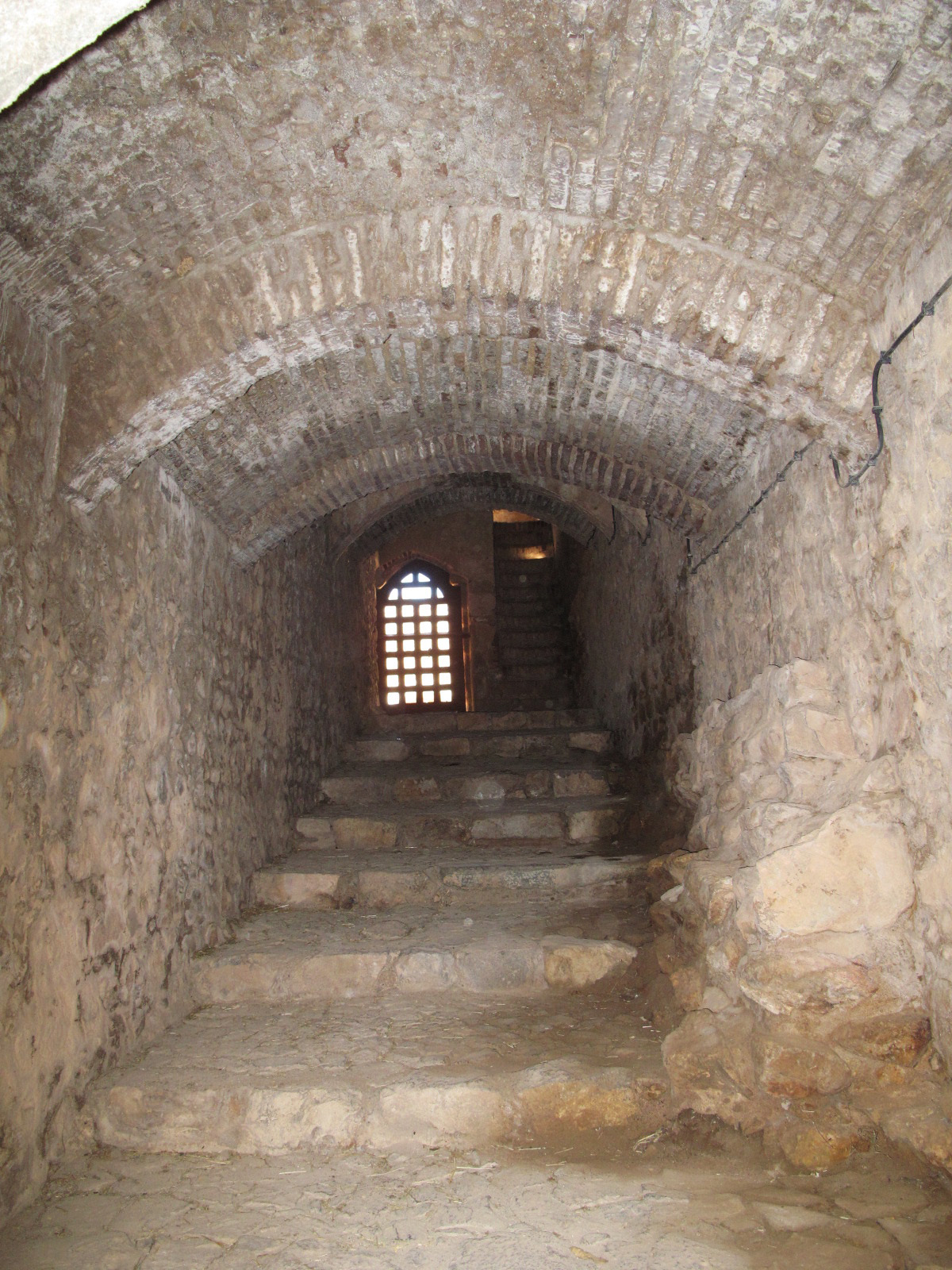
Part of the staircase leading to the northwest battlements

The castle is found in an isolated urban context, on an elevated zone known as the Costa da Vila Fria, with many of the towers and walls extending over the landscape.

The plan of the castle is an irregular quadrilateral polygon, defined by four walls, flanked by towers in the south, west and north. The Porta da Vila (Town Gate), in the southwest, is surmounted by a capstone with the coat-of-arms of King John II of Portugal, and opened to the courtyard where there are several older buildings.

To the south is a cistern, alongside the northeast part of the fortification's wall, with spaces for the alcalde located in a two-storey structure.

Access to the battlements are made from a staircase on the northwestern wall, defended by three simple embrasures and through a doorway with broken bow (that also provides access to the Porta da Traição (Traitor's Gate). The northwestern battlements provide access to the keep tower, a rectangular structure, flanking the western angle. A Roman arched gate provides entry into the towers principal hall, with four arrowslits and a vaulted ceiling with rounded cross-beams, formed from the four corner posts. From two flights of stairs is the next floor, just before the rooftop, with tiled roof. The southwest battlements provide access to the tower alongside the town gate, with a staircase to the roof. The extreme part of the battlements provide access to the rooftop artillery point, a nine-sided position, which flanks the southern angle of the fortification. This emplacement provides two levels of gun fire, with 12 arrowslits, although the top group is covered by the posterior-constructed vaulted, semi-spherical ceiling. The southeastern battlements links to the northeast wall, interrupted by the masonry of the alcalde's residence. On the outside of this wall, a support structure, that presupposes a terrace for the residence is visible. To the extreme of the wall is circular construction, with semi-spherical cupola, protecting the entrance to a circular staircase providing access to the exterior.

Flanked along the northern extent, an almost square tower with plain parapet and running bunk in masonry. Toward the keep tower, on the left is a suspended cistern and to the right a rectangular tower, with plain parapet. All the battlements in the castle are wide.

The two-storey alcalde's residence is entered from the main floor porch, across a Roman archway. The posterior facade includes two second-floor windows, one with a truncated angular arch, while the other with a canopy-like arch. The porch includes a vaulted ceiling with spines focused on a five-pointed star. A Roman arch entrance-way leads into ample hall, with vaulted ceiling consisting of six beams and seven arches anchored by pillars. A marble exterior staircase, consisting of two flights lead to a porch decorated with eight rectangular pillars. From here two doors, with square frames, provide access to halls, covered in wood ceiling. Along the southeast, is a hall with five doors, a window and a fireplace, which connects to the kitchen (with stove and fireplace). The hall situated on the northwest has two windows and three doors, one of which is common to the interior.
