= Castro of Castelo Velho =

- Castro de Castelo Velho

General information
- Type: Castro
- Architectural style: Chalcolithic
- Location: Terena (São Pedro), Alandroal, Portugal
- Coordinates: 38.6316°N 7.4477°W
- Opened: Bronze Age
- Owner: Portuguese Republic

Technical details
- Material: Schist

The Castro of Castelo Velho (Portuguese: Castro de Castelo Velho) is a Chalcolithic settlement in the civil parish of Terena (São Pedro), municipality of Alandroal in the Alentejo Central area of the Portuguese Alentejo.

== History ==
The first settlements date to the Chalcolithic. By the late Bronze Age the location had become a centre of intense metallurgical activities.

During the Moorish period of settlement, the site was occupied by Muslim settlers.

During the 20th century (1990s), Manuel Calado held the first archaeological excavations in the area to study the settlement.

== Architecture ==
The old castle is situated in an isolated, rural area delimited by the Rio Lucefecit and smaller affluent, overlooking the territory of high hilltops and eastern flanks. Access to the site is only possible from the western edge. Implanted near a settlement is another settlement designated "Castelo Velho 2", with common characteristics, while 1,500 metres (4,900 ft) from the site is the Santuário de Endovélico em São Miguel da Mota.

The fortified settlement has an irregular plan, utilized and modified in different periods. Around its perimeter is a slope with visible vestiges of low walls. These defensive structures have distinct plans corresponding to different phases at the site. The vestiges of structures constructed in the irregular perimeter walls, with the larger structures located near the east and south. Along the northern flank, is a small, irregular gallery related to the probable mining or possible ritual space. The gallery is known as the Casa da Moura (House of the Female Moor), which could have a parallel with the ethnographic sanctuaries that existed in the region, such as in Pego da Moura or Pego da Rocha da Moura (properly attributed to similar enchanted Moors).

The defensibility of the settlement was secured by its location in an elevated position, protected by the river and its inclined eastern and western margins. In the west, is a narrow road that permits the unique access to the site. Close to this is the principal entrance to the settlement is a schist platform, where there are visible ceramics, foundry slag and remnants of structures that could correspond to an area of marginal habitation related to metallurgical activities.
