= Alandroal =

- Municipality
- Town of Alandroal
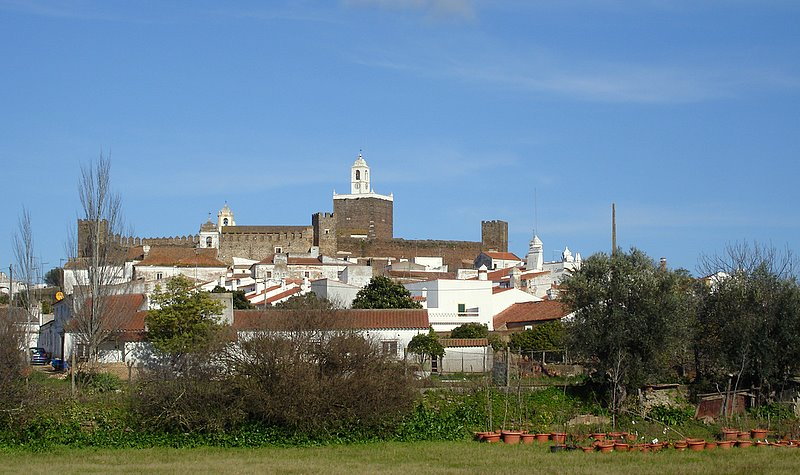
- A profile of Alandroal showing the parochial church and low-lying buildings

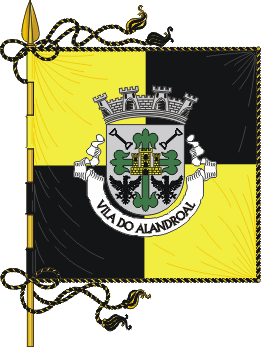
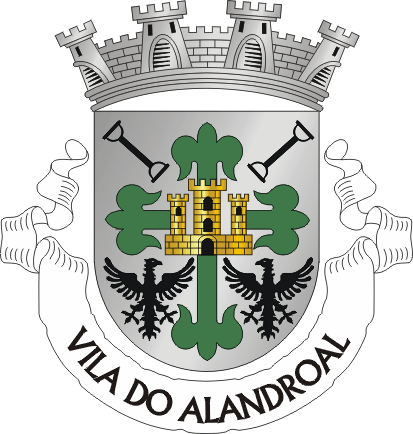
- Flag Coat of arms
- Interactive map of Alandroal
- Location in Portugal
- Coordinates: 38°37′N 7°24′W
- Country: Portugal
- Region: Alentejo
- Intermunic. comm.: Alentejo Central
- District: Évora
- Parishes: 4

Government
  - President: João Maria Aranha Grilo (PS)

Area
  - Total: 542.68 km^{2} (209.53 sq mi)
- Elevation: 341 m (1,119 ft)

Population (2011)
  - Total: 5,843
  - Density: 10.77/km^{2} (27.89/sq mi)
- Time zone: UTC+00:00 (WET)
  - Summer (DST): UTC+01:00 (WEST)
- Postal code: 7250
- Patron: Nossa Senhora da Boa Nova
- Website: http://www.cm-alandroal.pt

Alandroal (Portuguese pronunciation: [ɐlɐ̃dɾuˈal]), officially Alandroal Town (Portuguese: Vila do Alandroal), is a municipality in the Portuguese district of Évora located on the eastern frontier with Spain along the right margin of the Guadiana River in the Central Alentejo region. It is located 341 metres (1,119 ft) above sea level, northeast of Évora and southeast of Estremoz. The population in 2011 was 5,843, in an area of 542.68 km^{2}.

== History ==
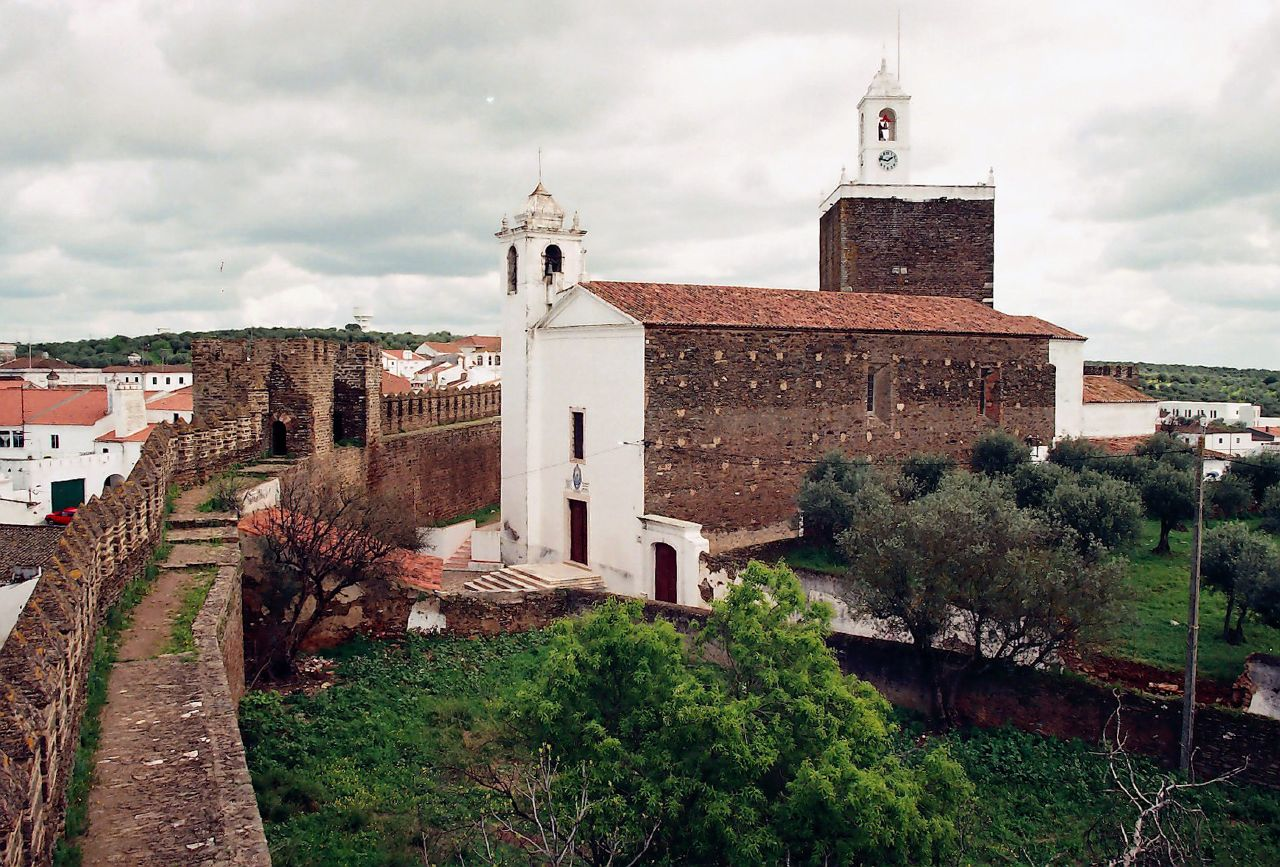
The historical castle walls and the classical parochial church

With the completion of the castle in 1298, by Lourenço Afonso (9th Master of the Order of Aviz), the noble fulfilled his obligation to King Denis of Portugal to expand the territory that would form Alandroal. By 1359, the church of Alandroal was incorporated under the commander of the Order of Avis, but it was only a century later (1486) that John II would issue a foral (charter) for the town. Alandroal was elevated to town at this time, while only including the parish of Nossa Senhora da Conceição. A second foral was conceded in 1514 by his successor, Manuel I of Portugal.

Alandroal's historic importance include the medieval structures during the early period of Christian conquest, including the Castle of Alandroal (whose main gate was flanked by two towers); the Castle of Terena, consisting of wall-enclosed courtyard, keep and towers; the fortress of Juromenha, whose balusters were constructed later during the Portuguese Restoration War, but whose proximity to the Guadiana frontier provided a natural buttress to Castilian influence in the region.

The lands at the time, flowered with Nerium oleander shrubs and trees, whose wood was used by local artisans. Its Portuguese toponymy oleandro gave rise to the name aloendros or alandros, eventually alandroal.

The sanctuary of Nossa Senhora da Assunção da Boa Nova, apart from its religious importance, is of national importance. In 1340, the Moors had invaded from Andaluzia, resulting in an alliance between Alfonso XI of Castile and his father-in-law, Afonso IV of Portugal, that culminated in the Battle of Río Salado. In honor of their assistance during the Marinid invasion, Maria of Portugal, Queen of Castile ordered the construction of the Gothic church to commemorate their victory.

In the 16th century the old Gothic church was substituted but the current parochial church in Alandroal. At the same time, the hermitage of Nossa Senhora das Neves, in the older lands of Mata, then known as Nossa Senhora das Hervas, received annual festivals on 5 August. Similarly, the brotherhood of the Misercórdia was probably established this century, constructing the primitive temple for those religious services.

On 14 January 1659, a gunpowder warehouse exploded, causing the deaths of various residents, but primarily university students from Évora (under the authority of Father Francisco Soares), who were dispatched to Alandroal while the main Portuguese army fought in the Battle of the Lines of Elvas.

The effects of the 1755 Lisbon earthquake resulted in destruction of various buildings.

By the second half of the 18th century, a decision of the Council of State to King Joseph I permitted the construction of a new municipal building for Alandroal, for which were acquired furniture from local and awnings for the market.

During the 19th Century territories of the older municipalities of Terena and Juromenha where annexed to Alandroal. The community of Villarreal, situated in the municipality of Olivença was once a part of the antique administration of Juromenha.

== Geography ==
Population of the municipality of Alandroal (1849 - 2011)
Year	Pop.	±%
1801	1,541	—
1849	4,651	+201.8%
1900	7,493	+61.1%
1930	10,444	+39.4%
1960	12,089	+15.8%
1981	8,124	−32.8%
1991	7,347	−9.6%
2001	6,585	−10.4%
2011	5,843	−11.3%

The municipality is delimited in the north by Vila Viçosa, east by the Guadiana River and Spanish border, south by Mourão and Reguengos de Monsaraz, and west by the municipality of Redondo. Alandroal is one of three towns defined within the municipality of the same name, and includes the vilas of Terena and Juromenha.

The morphology of Alandroal is marked by a gently rolling relief with a minimum of 500 metres (1,600 ft) altitude, with exceptions to this including Patinhas, 351 metres (1,152 ft) and Castelo mountain 638 metres (2,093 ft). The Alqueva Dam, along the Guadiana River, is located in this territory, with major confluences including the Ribeira de Alcalate and Ribeira do Alandroal just the principal water resources.

The climate of Alandroal is a markedly Mediterranean temperament, characterized by a dry climate that is accentuated in the summer. Precipitation in the region hovers between 500 millimetres (20 in) between October and March, and 170 millimetres (6.7 in), during the dry season, which is irregular.

The municipality covers approximately 544.86 square kilometres (210.37 mi^{2}) and has 6585 inhabitants (based on the 2001 census).

=== Parishes ===
The municipality is subdivided into four civil parishes:

- Alandroal (Nossa Senhora da Conceição), São Brás dos Matos (Mina do Bugalho) e Juromenha (Nossa Senhora do Loreto)
- Capelins (Santo António)
- Santiago Maior
- Terena (São Pedro)

The city of Alandroal is one of three towns in the municipality, along with Terena and Juromenha.

== Economy ==
The municipality's economic activities are connected to the primary and secondary sectors primarily. Agriculture continues to be important, with the cultivation of cereals, foraging and industrial plants, such as olive orchards dominating the rural landscape. The raising of livestock, namely poultry, swine and cattle, also draws on local resources, while 36.3% (or 1711 hectares) of the territory is covered in forests, allowing a nascent saw-milling and carpentry industry.

== Architecture ==
=== Prehistoric ===
- Castro of Castelo Velho (Portuguese: Castro de Castelo Velho), a fortified settlement situated over the Rio Lucefecit associated with metallurgical activities during the Chalolithic era, that includes several structures and short wall. The site had human settlement since the Bronze Age until the Moorish occupation, but little information on events leading to its abandon.
- Fortified settlement/sanctuary of Endovelicus (Portuguese: Povoado fortificado e Santuário de Endovélico)

=== Civic ===
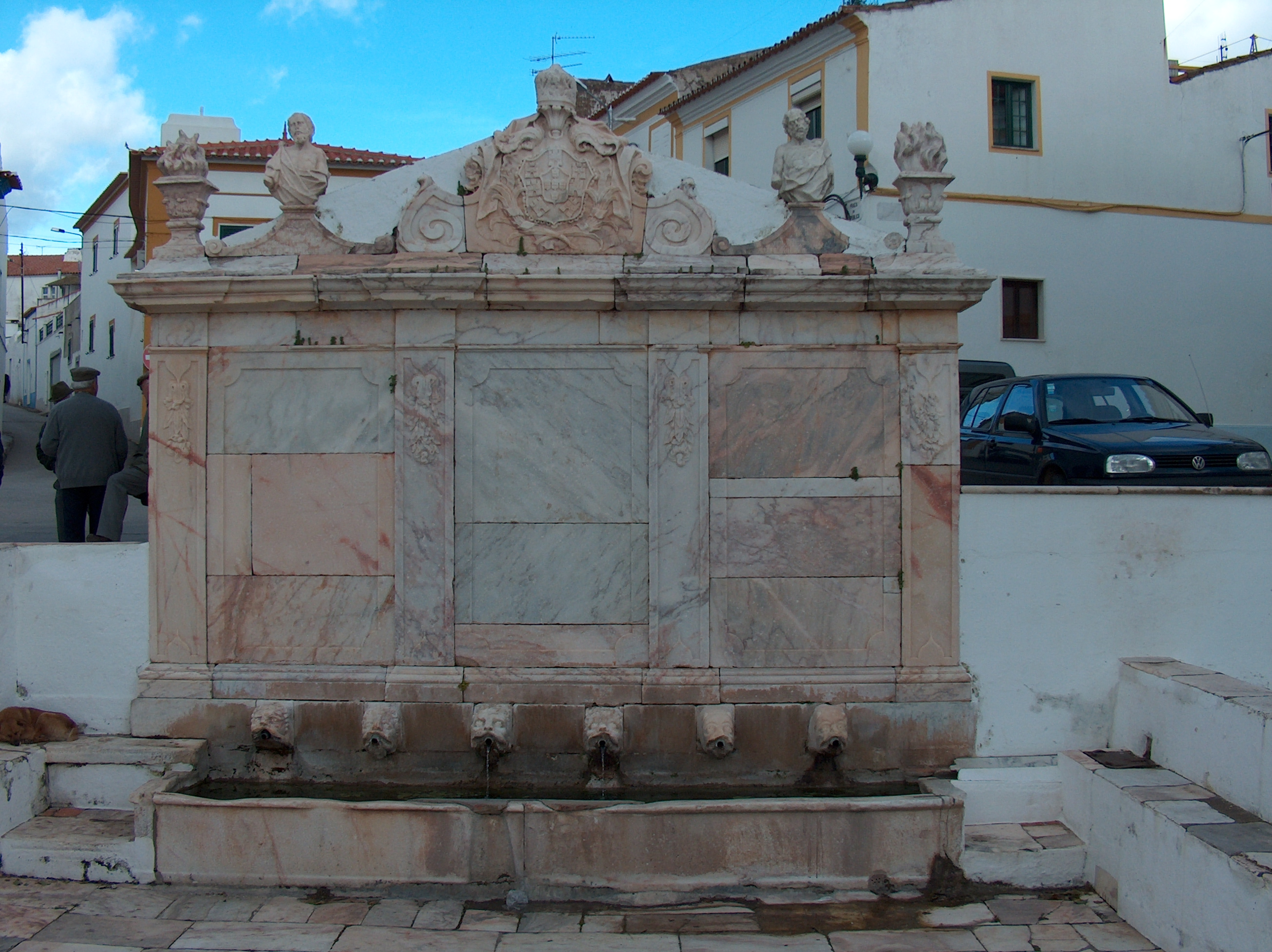
The baroque-style fountain of Praça

- Farmers Guild of Alandroal (Portuguese: Grémio de Lavoura do Alandroal)
- Fountain of Praça (Portuguese: Fonte das Bicas/Fonte Monumental da Praça/Fonte da Praça)
- Great Mill of São Brás dos Matos (Portuguese: Azenha Grande de São Brás dos Matos)
- Mill of Azenhas d'el Rei (Portuguese: Moinho das Azenhas d'el Rei)
- Municipal Hall of Alandroal (Portuguese: Paços do Concelho de Alandroal)
- Municipal Hall of Terena (Portuguese: Edifício dos Paços do Concelho de Terena/Celeiro Comum/Hospital da Misericórdia)
- Old Bridge of Terena (over the Ribeira de Lucefécit) (Portuguese: Ponte Velha de Terena sobre a Ribeira de Lucefécit)
- Pillory of Alandroal (Portuguese: Pelourinho de Alandroal)
- Pillory of Juromenha (Portuguese: Pelourinho da Juromenha)
- Pillory of Terena (Portuguese: Pelourinho de Terena)
- Spring of the Misericórdia (Portuguese: Fonte da Misericórdia)

=== Military ===
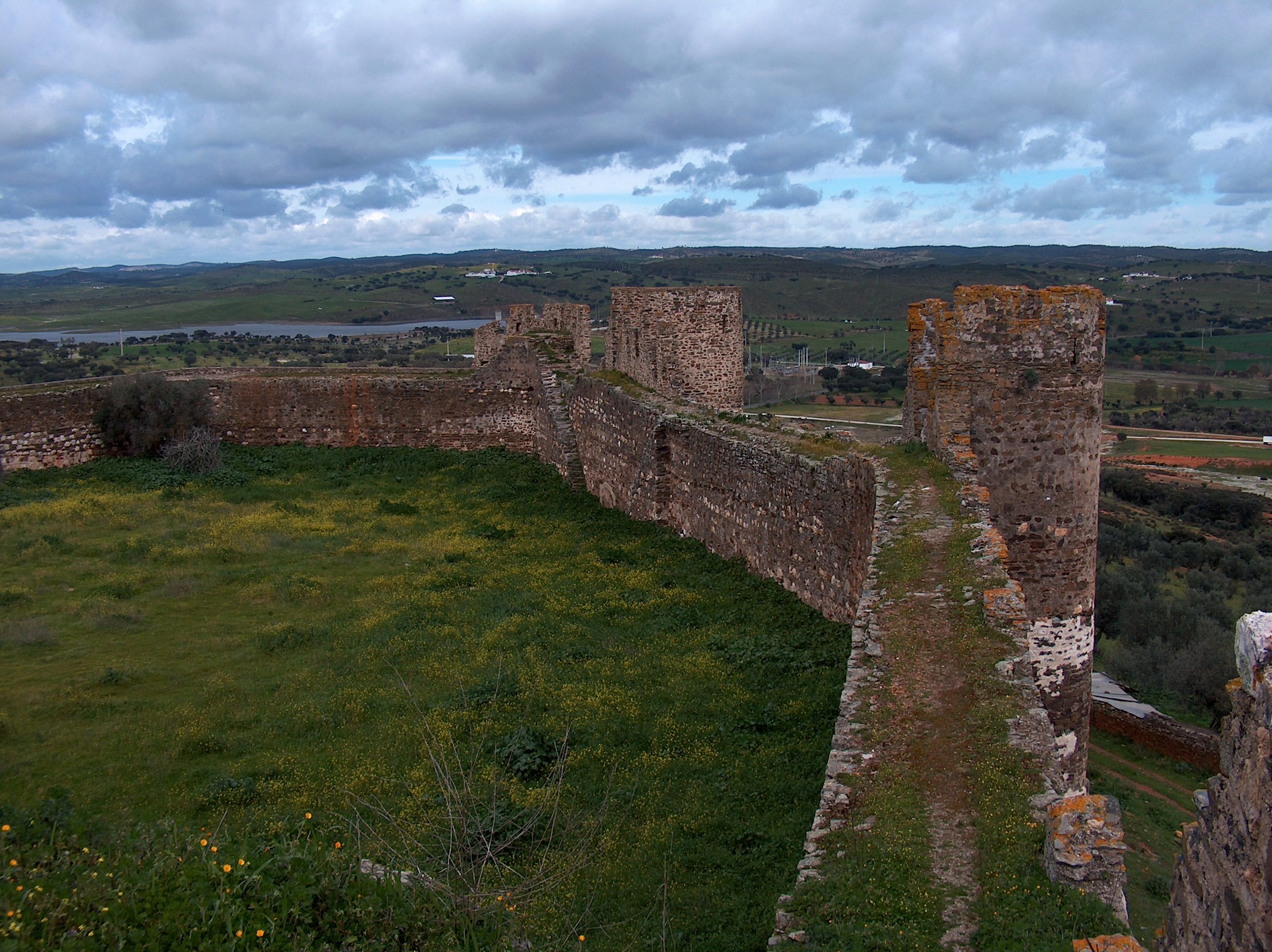
The fortified walls of the castle of Terena

- Castle of Alandroal (Portuguese: Castelo de Alandroal), is a castle constructed during the reign of King D. Denis, dated 6 February 1294; its cornerstone was laid-down by Lourenço Afonso, 9th Master of the Order of Avis;
- Castle of Terena (Portuguese: Castelo de Terena), Gil Martins and his wife, D. Maria João were responsible for its founding in 1262, to support the interests of King D. Denis to consolidate his kingdom's frontiers;
- Fortress of Juromenha (Portuguese: Fortaleza de Juromenha)

=== Religious ===
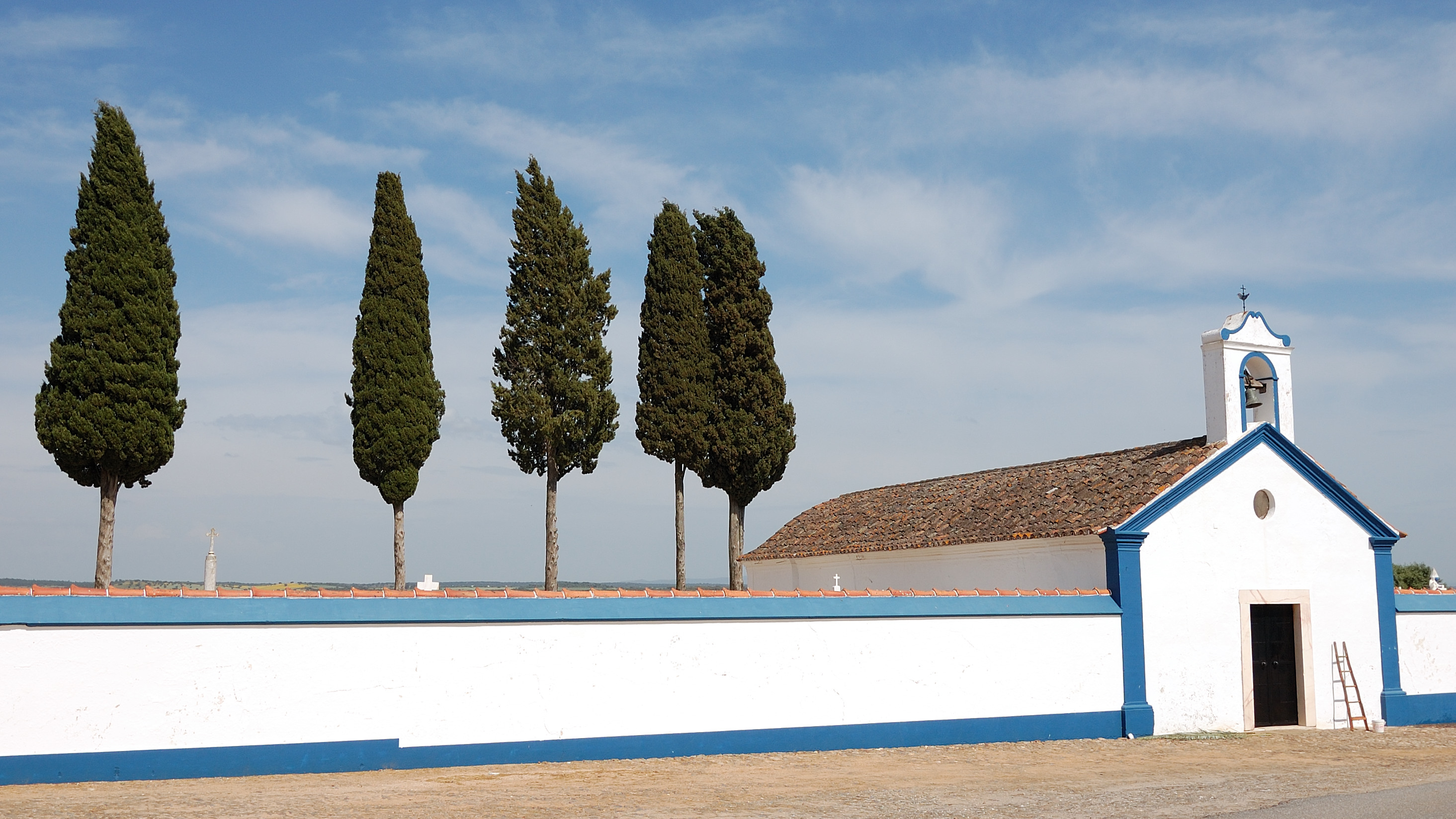
The isolated chapel of Nossa Senhora da Consolação in the parish of Nossa Senhora da Consolação

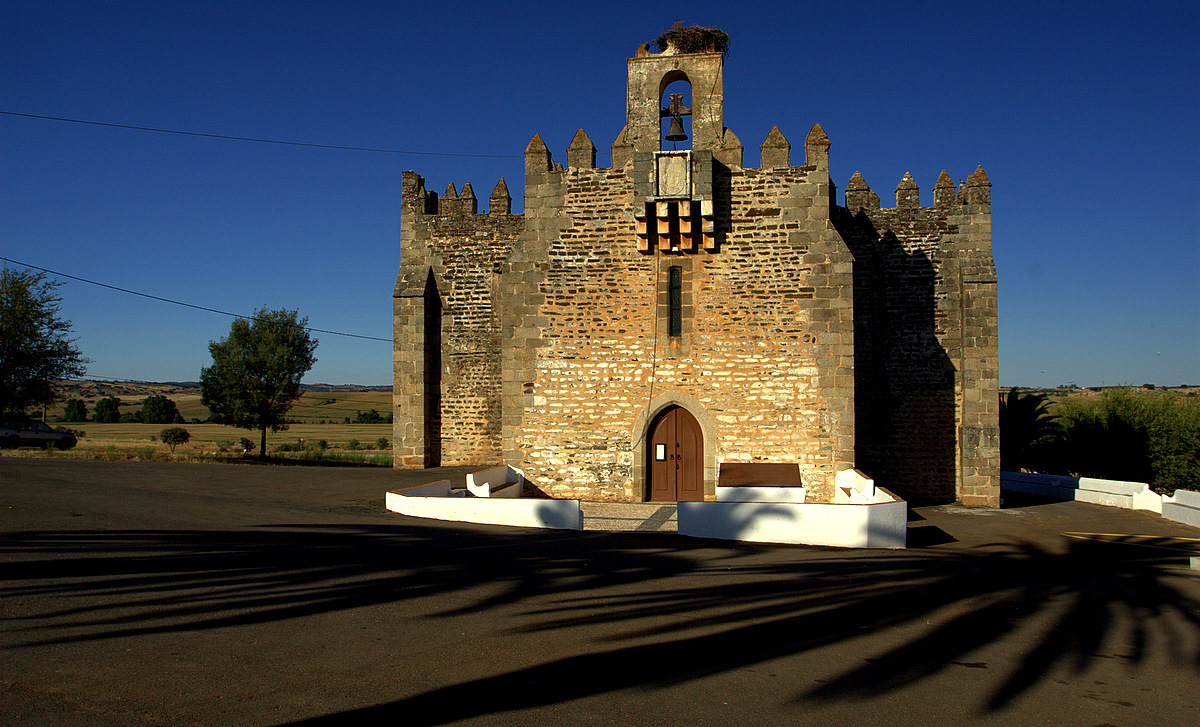
The Gothic sanctuary of Nossa Senhora da Assunção da Boa Nova, erected to honour the alliance between Castille and Portugal at the Battle of Salado

- Chapel of Santo António (Portuguese: Capela de Santp António)
- Chapel of São Sebastião (Portuguese: Capela de São Sebastião)
- Church of Nossa Senhora da Conceição (Portuguese: Igreja Matriz do Alandroal/Igreja de Nossa Senhora da Conceição)
- Church of Nossa Senhora do Loreto (Portuguese: Igreja Paroquial de Juromenha/Igreja de Nossa Senhora do Loreto)
- Church of Santo António (Portuguese: Igreja Paroquial de Capelins/Igreja de Santo António)
- Church of São Brás (Portuguese: Igreja Paroquial de São Brás dos Matos/Igreja de São Brás)
- Church of São Francisco de Assissi (Portuguese: Igreja de São Francisco de Assissi)
- Church of São Pedro (Portuguese: Igreja Paroquial de Terena/Igreja de São Pedro)
- Church of São Tigao (Portuguese: Igreja Paroquial de Santiago Maior/Igreja de São Tiago)
- Church of the Misericórdia of Alandroal (Portuguese: Igreja e Hospital da Misericórdia do Alandroal)
- Church of the Misericórdia of Juromenha (Portuguese: Igreja da Misericórdia da Juromenha)
- Church of the Misericórdia of Terena (Portuguese: Igreja da Misericórdia de Terena)
- Hermitage of Nossa Senhora da Consolação (Portuguese: Ermida de Nossa Senhora da Consolação)
- Hermitage of Nossa Senhora da Vitória (Portuguese: Ermida de Nossa Senhora da Vitória)
- Hermitage of Nossa Senhora das Neves (Portuguese: Ermida de Nossa Senhora das Neves)
- Hermitage of Santa Clara (Portuguese: Ermida da Santa Clara)
- Hermitage of Santo Amaro (Portuguese: Ermida de Santo Amaro)
- Hermitage of Santo António (Portuguese: Ermida de Santo António)
- Hermitage of São Bento (Portuguese: Ermida de São Bento)
- Hermitage of São Pedro (Portuguese: Ermida de São Pedro)
- Hermitage of São Sebastião (Portuguese: Ermida de São Sebastião)
- Hermitage/Shelter of Santa Marina (Portuguese: Ermida e Albergaria de Santa Marina/Ermida e Albergaria de Nossa Senhora da Fonte Santa)
- Hospice/Hermitage of Nossa Senhora da Saúde (Portuguese: Hospício e Ermida de Nossa Senhora da Saúde)
- Sanctuary of Nossa Senhora da Assunção da Boa Nova (Portuguese: Santuário de Nossa Senhora da Assunção da Boa Nova/Capela da Boa-Nova), the fortified Gothic sanctuary/church was founded in 1340 by D. Maria, wife of Alfonso XI Castilo and daughter of Afonso V of Portugal, after the victory at the Battle of Salado using a Greek cruciform plan. In 1700, it was remodelled by commander Luís Lencastre, followed later in the 18th century by the construction of two collateral altars, while maintaining the vaulted ceilings, itself painted in murals consisting of 20 rectangular images depicting the bible themes from the apocalypse of Saint John, and representations of the monarchs of the first dynasty;
- Way of the Cross (Portuguese: Passos do Senhor)

== Culture ==
Popular and religious festivals in the municipality include the annual pilgrimage to the sanctuary of Nossa Senhora da Boa Nova in Terena, during the Easter Sunday; the fair of São Bento, on 15 April; and the fair in Juromenha, on 10 August.

Local artisans are also proficient in working with cork, nerium woods and schist stone.

== Notable citizens ==
- Fernão Lopes (c. 1385 – after 1459) a Portuguese chronicler appointed by King Edward of Portugal
- Diogo Lopes de Sequeira (c. 1465 - c. 1530), was Portuguese fidalgo, Governor of India (1518–1522)
