= Castle of Alandroal =

Medieval castle in Alandroal, Évora, Portugal

- Castelo de Alandroal
- Évora, Alentejo Central, Alentejo in Portugal
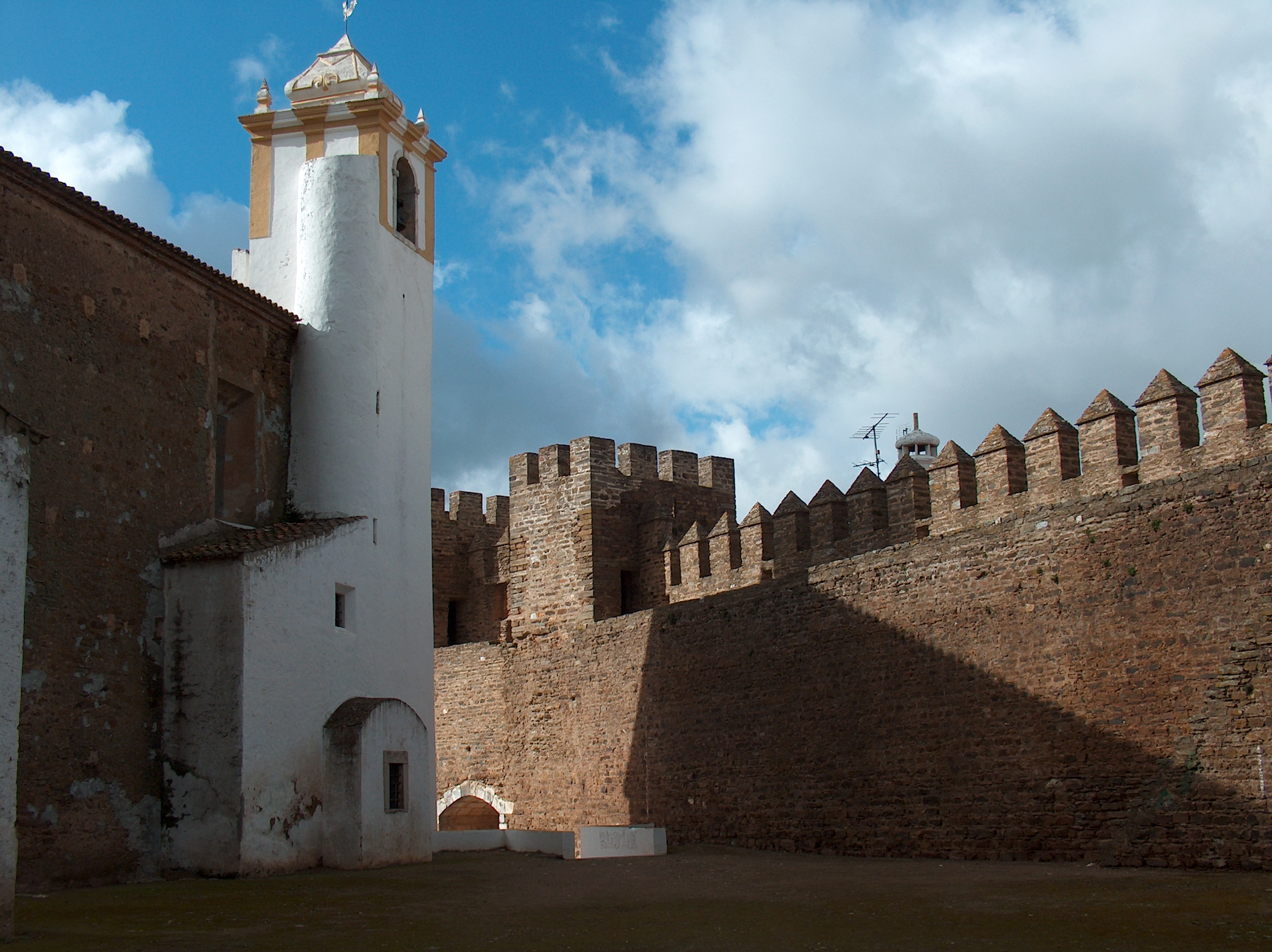

Site information
- Type: Castle
- Owner: Portuguese Republic
- Open to the public: Public

Location
- Coordinates: 38°42′06″N 7°24′15″W

Site history
- Built: c. 13th Century

The Castle of Alandroal (Portuguese: Castelo do Alandroal) is a medieval castle in the civil parish of Alandroal (Nossa Senhora da Conceição), São Brás dos Matos (Mina do Bugalho) e Juromenha (Nossa Senhora do Loreto), municipality of Alandroal, Portuguese district of Évora, classified as a National Monument.

== History ==
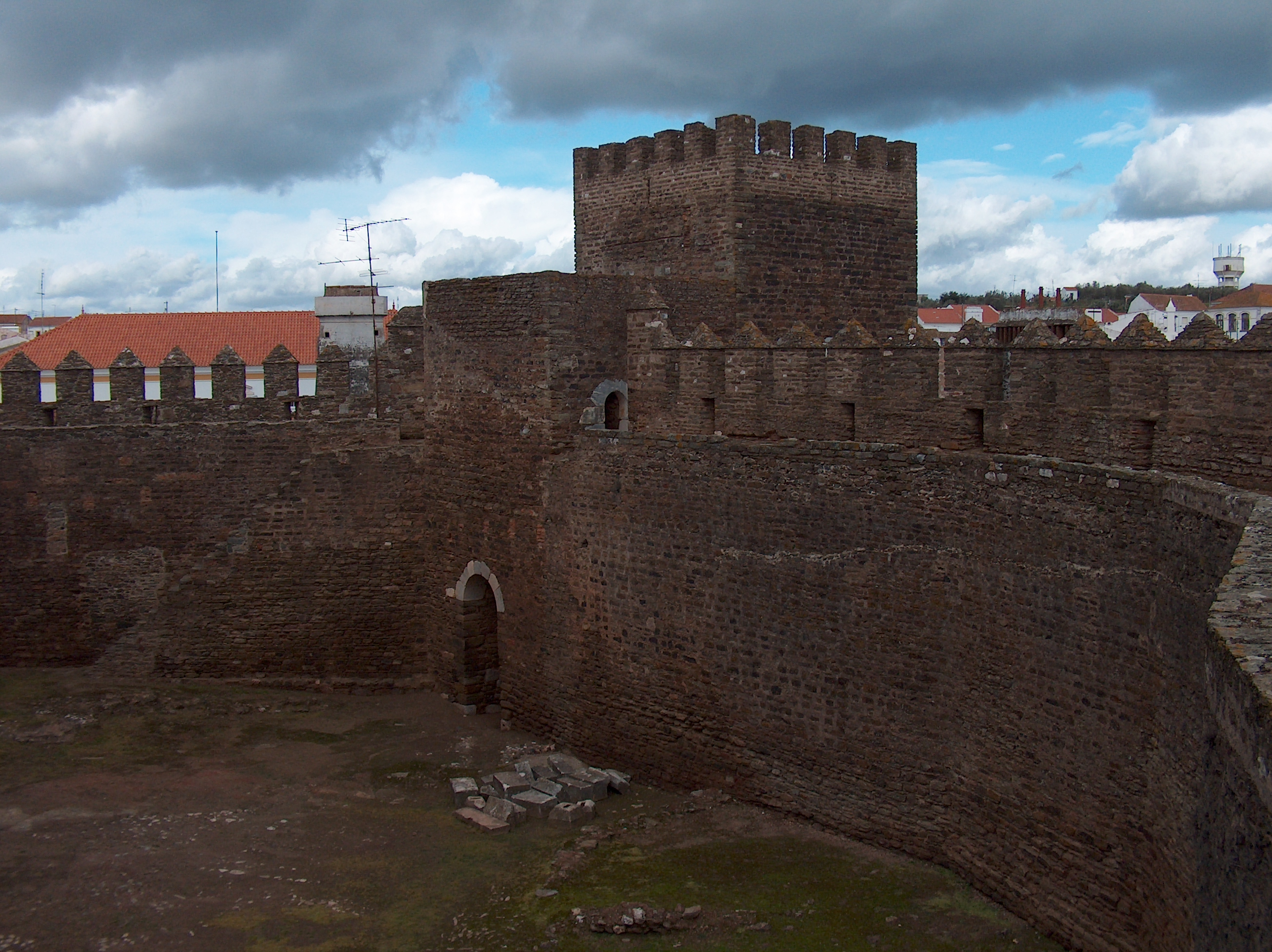
The keep and walls of the main fortifications

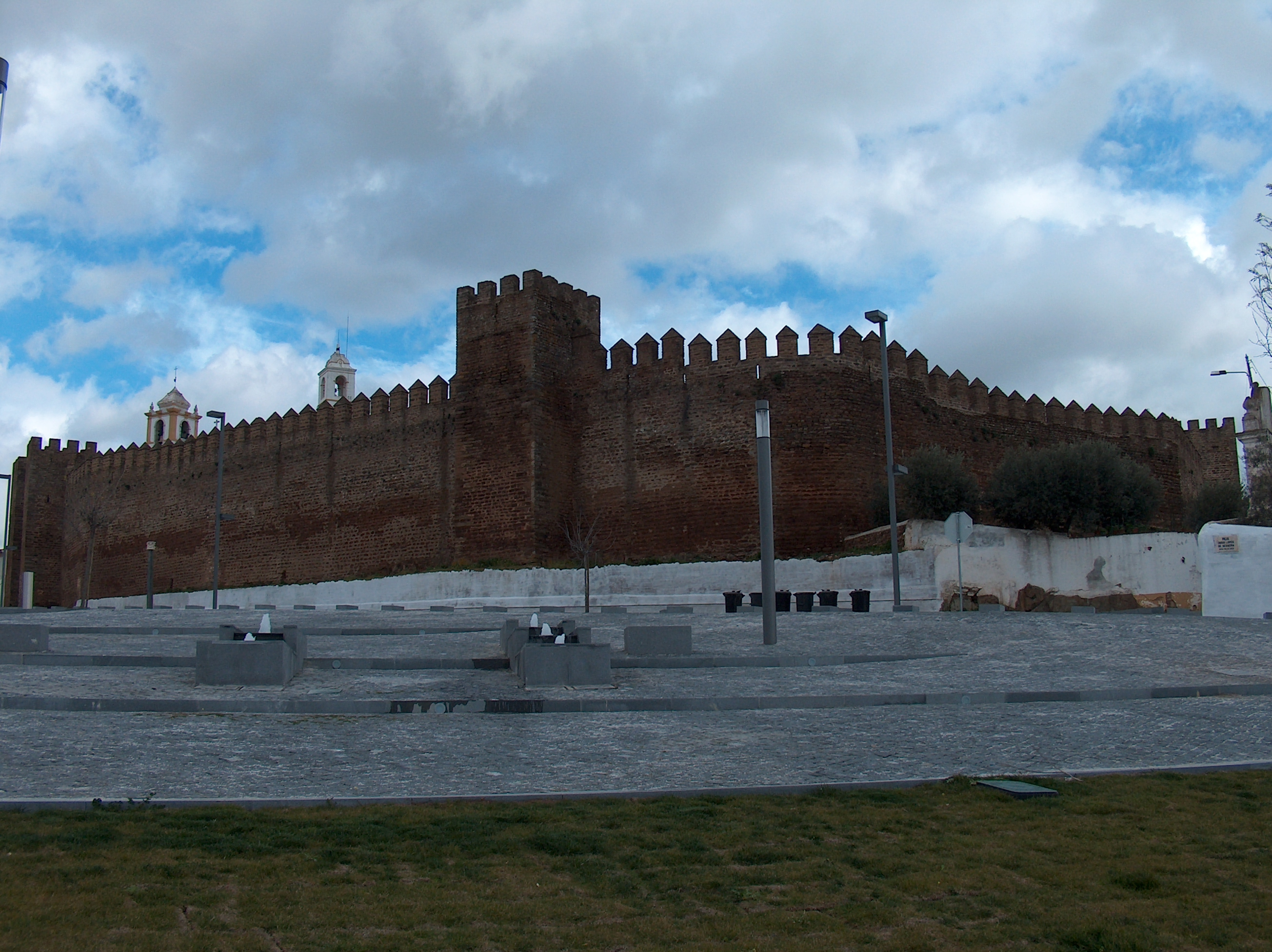
Fortifications and battlements of the castle, as seen from outside the fortress

The Gothic castle of Alandroal was one of the military constructions during the reign of King D. Denis, dated from several inscriptions and commemorative plaques located within the fortress. The first dates to 6 February 1294 and is situated over the gates of the fortress. These plaques indicate that the project promoter was the Master of the Order of Avis, then D. João Afonso, who was responsible for placing the first stone on that date. The second plaque recalls the placing of the first cornerstone in 1294, by Lourenço Afonso, 9th Master of the Order of Avis, their founder, located in the western part of the keep tower. The construction of the fortification continued until 1298 and were attributed to a Moor, named Galvao, illustrating a distinction between Moorish adversaries of the time and common workers.

Between 1383 and 1385, Pedro Rodrigues, was the alcalde of the fortress. Yet, in the following years, Alandroal played little role in the organization of the military lines of the region, and it quickly began to decline.

By 1606, the interior of the castle, including the residential spaces were already in a considerable state of ruin. But, in 1774, the construction of the clock tower had already preceded indicating a level of recuperation at the site.

The barbican was destroyed in 1778 and materials from the site were used in the construction of the new municipal buildings. Between 1786 and 1793, the comarca's jail was constructed, resulting in the eventual demolition of the tower and primitive belfry (where the clock was installed).

The DGEMN undertook significant rebuilding and restoration on site between 1943 and 1946, as well as 1958, to restore the military square and several of the fortified wall. This included the restoration of the keep tower and demolition of some homes in order to open-up the castle spaces. The staircases along the battlements were regularized and stabilized, with reconstruction occurring on many of the rises. Modern projects in 1980 and 1986 also attempted to stabilize the foundation and clear plant infestants that covered the site, in addition to masonry repairs to improve water flow along the walls, merlons and tower near the Church of the Misericórdia.

The decaying structure was placed under the stewardship of the Instituto Português do Património Arquitetónico (IPPR) on 1 June 1992 (Decree 106F/92, Diário da República, Série 1A, 126).

== Architecture ==
The castle is situated on the most elevated point of the town of Alandroal. Dating back to the 13th century, this medieval fortress is typical of the Gothic fortifications of the period based on an oval design, with keep addorsed to a circuit of walls and gate (designated the Legal Gate), protected by two rectangular towers, slightly advanced to allow protection at the entranceway. Originally, the castle included a small quarter within its walls divided by a singular roadway (the Rua do Castelo) oriented west to east and flanked by two gates (the aforementioned Legal Gate and the Arrabalde Gate).

The keep tower is a rectangular structure divided into three floors, whose interior access has been sealed. This doorway provided access (sometime later in its history) to the matriarchial church at the location (sometime in the 18th century). At the top of the keep tower, a clocktower was implanted, that included three bronze bells.

The military square has two lateral staircases that lead to the battlements. The traitor's gate (today obstructed) crosses the Cadeia forte (Jail Fort), named for the addorsed western structure used as the jailhouse for regional comarca (a rectangular tower with grated and gross windows). The tower of this forte has a rectangular plan and rectangular dependency with stone balcony (to the west) with arch and sculpted capitals.
