= Castle of Ouguela =

Coordinates: 39°04′44″N 7°01′51″W

- Castelo de Ouguela
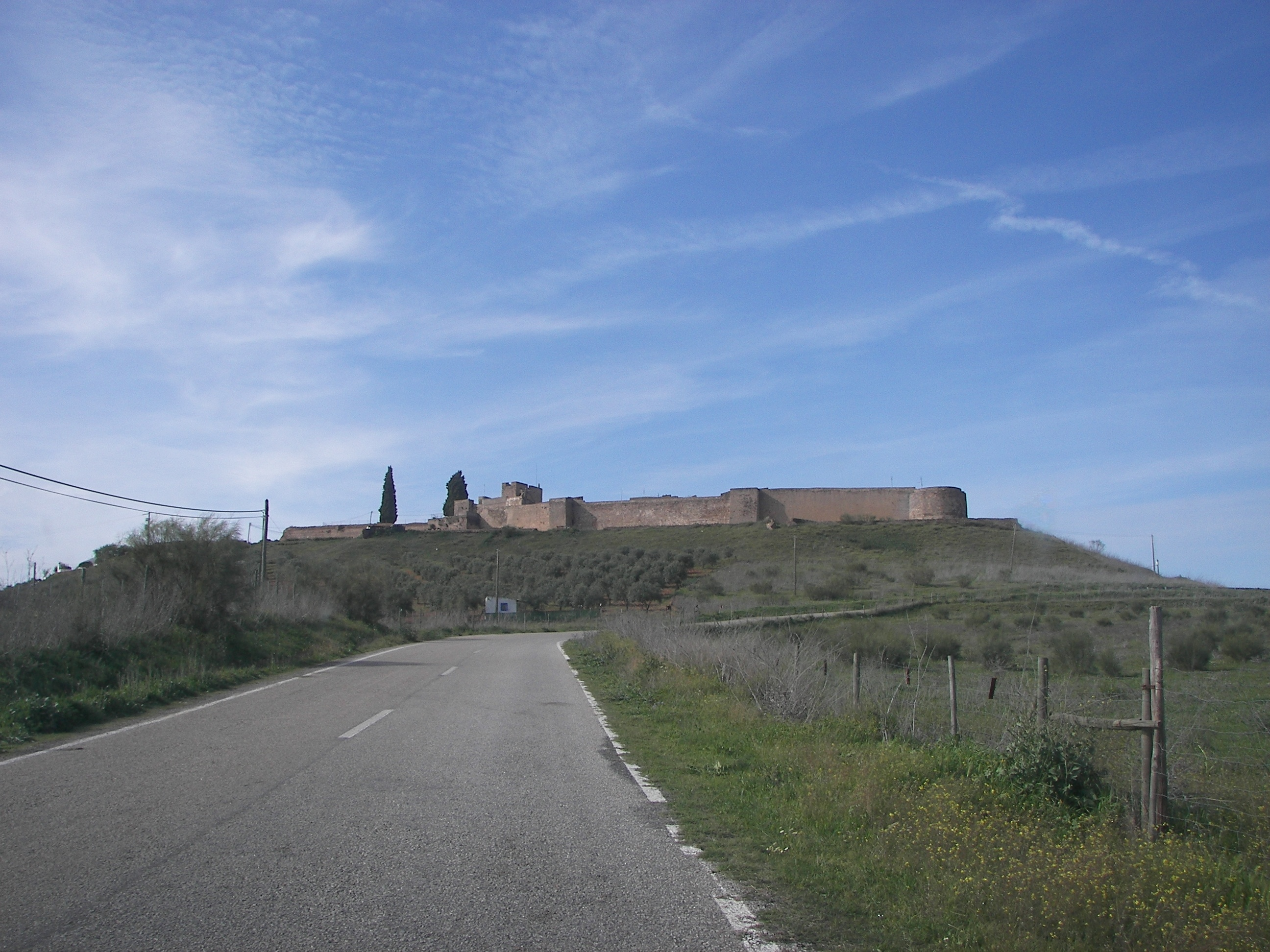
- Interactive map of Castle of Ouguela

General information
- Location: Ouguela
- Owner: Portugal

The Castle of Ouguela (Portuguese: Castelo de Ouguela) is a medieval castle erected in the civil parish of São João Baptista, municipality of Campo Maior, in the Portuguese district of Portalegre.

It is classified by IGESPAR as a Site of Public Interest.

Built on an escarpment, the castle dominates the village on the left bank of Abrilongo riverside, near its confluence with the Xévora river. Rebuilt by King Dinis (1279–1325), the castle received bulwark walls during the reign of King John IV (1640–1656). Its walls resembled the Spanish fortification of Alburquerque. It currently is a member of the Tourism-Promotion Plains Area.

== History ==
=== Early history ===
The early occupation of its site dates back to pre-Roman fort. At the time of the Roman invasion and occupation of the Iberian Peninsula, the town was designated under the name Budua. During its occupation by the Visigoths, they called it Niguela. From the eighth century Umuyyad Muslims had the town fortified.

=== Medieval castle ===
At the time of the Reconquista of the Iberian Peninsula, reconquest of the village and its surrounding land was finally achieved in 1230, by Castilian and Leonese forces. Years later, on 28 May 1255, the Wise men of Badajoz county donated Ouguela and elsewhere to the Bishop of Badajoz.

By the Treaty of Alcañices on 12 September 1297, the domains of Ouguela and its castle transferred to the Crown of Portugal. The following year, King Dinis (1279–1325) in Lisbon on 5 January 1298, aimed at increasing Ouguela's settlement and defense, and granted the town a charter with many privileges, with a focus on its defense.

During the reign of Ferdinand I of Portugal, construction began on the new city wall, works that continued under the reign of John I of Portugal (1385-1433). The latter, also with the aim of establishing and defending the city, granted it the privilege of a fortified township (7 December 1420).

=== War of Independence to modern day ===
During the War for the Restoration of Portuguese independence, the advisers to John IV (1640–1656) determined that there was a need to modernize its defenses, which included fortified lines designed by the French architect Nicolau de Langres.

It was during this period that a legendary event took place. In 1644 a Spanish force of 1,500 cavalry and 1,000 infantery coming from Badajoz and under the command of Carlo Andrea Caracciolo marquis of Torrecuso, invaded the Alentejo. A Portuguese traitor, João Rodrigues de Oliveira, offered the Spanish to conquer the city with a ruse. But some residents became aware of his plans and organized a hasty defense. The defenders resisted his attempt to blow up the castle gates and the assaults on the walls. After three hours of assault, the Spanish withdrew, leaving twenty dead and dozens wounded.

During the eighteenth century, records indicate construction started to build a bulwark, a half-bastion and a ravelin after the earthquake of 1755. With the defense thus strengthened, the garrison under the command of cavalry captain Brás de Carvalho repelled the Spanish attack.

A plan and profile of Ouguela, dated between 1755 and 1803, shows the defenses complemented by a watchtower, moats, and palisades. On that date, were built under the Marquis of command de la Reine, the Sergeant Major of Engineers Maximiano Jose Serra, the scopes of Cabeço da Forca and Martyr. Although there have been designed to recover one of the towers south of the castle (1828) and the construction of a crescent to the east Access Protection (1829), the square was demilitarized in 1840. Subsequently, the West sector, defined by bulwark structures, became the cemetery of the village.

The property was classified as Property of Public Interest by decree published on 18 August 1943.

The forces of nature taking its toll brought government attention. The government intervened through the National Buildings and Monuments Directorate General (DGEMN) and oversaw development campaigns in 1976, 1987, 1991 and 1994 that involved the consolidation, repairs and restoration of ramparts and the internal areas and access to the castle.

Recently developed a draft protection and enhancement of the castle and fortifications Ouguela, designed by the architects Miguel Pedroso de Lima and Jose Filipe Cardoso, integrating the recovery, revitalization and enhancement of the urban centers of Ouguela (Portugal) and Albuquerque (Spain) and their fortifications. The project envisages the creation of a museum area, core research and documentation, and implementation of circuits (equestrian and pedestrian) with scenic connection Albuquerque fortification.
