= Alentejo Central =

- Intermunicipal community
- Coordinates: 38°34′N 7°54′W
- Country: Portugal
- Region: Alentejo
- Established: 2009
- Seat: Évora
- Municipalities: 14

Area
  - Total: 7,393.46 km^{2} (2,854.63 sq mi)

Population (2011)
  - Total: 166,726
  - Density: 23/km^{2} (58/sq mi)
- Time zone: UTC+00:00 (WET)
  - Summer (DST): UTC+01:00 (WEST)
- Website: www.cimac.pt

The Comunidade Intermunicipal do Alentejo Central (European Portuguese: [ɐlẽˈtɛʒu sẽˈtɾal]; "Intermunicipal Community of Central Alentejo") is an administrative division in Portugal. It was created in 2009. The seat of the intermunicipal community is Évora, the main city. Other cities are Estremoz, Montemor-o-Novo, Vendas Novas and Reguengos de Monsaraz. Alentejo Central is coterminous with the former Évora District. The population in 2011 was 166,726, in an area of 7,393.46 km^{2}.

Alentejo Central is also a NUTS3 subregion of Alentejo Region, in Portugal. Since January 2015, the NUTS 3 subregion covers the same area as the intermunicipal community.

== Municipalities ==
The CIM Alentejo Central is composed of 14 municipalities:

Municipality	Population (2011)	Area (km^{2})
Alandroal	5,843	542.68
Arraiolos	7,363	683.75
Borba	7,333	145.19
Estremoz	14,318	513.80
Évora	56,596	1307.08
Montemor-o-Novo	17,437	1232.97
Mora	4,978	443.95
Mourão	2,663	278.63
Portel	6,428	601.01
Redondo	7,031	369.51
Reguengos de Monsaraz	10,828	464.00
Vendas Novas	11,846	222.39
Viana do Alentejo	5,743	393.67
Vila Viçosa	8,319	194.86
Total	166,726	7,393.46
