= Castle of Juromenha =

Castle in Portugal

Coordinates: 38°44′18″N 7°14′24″W

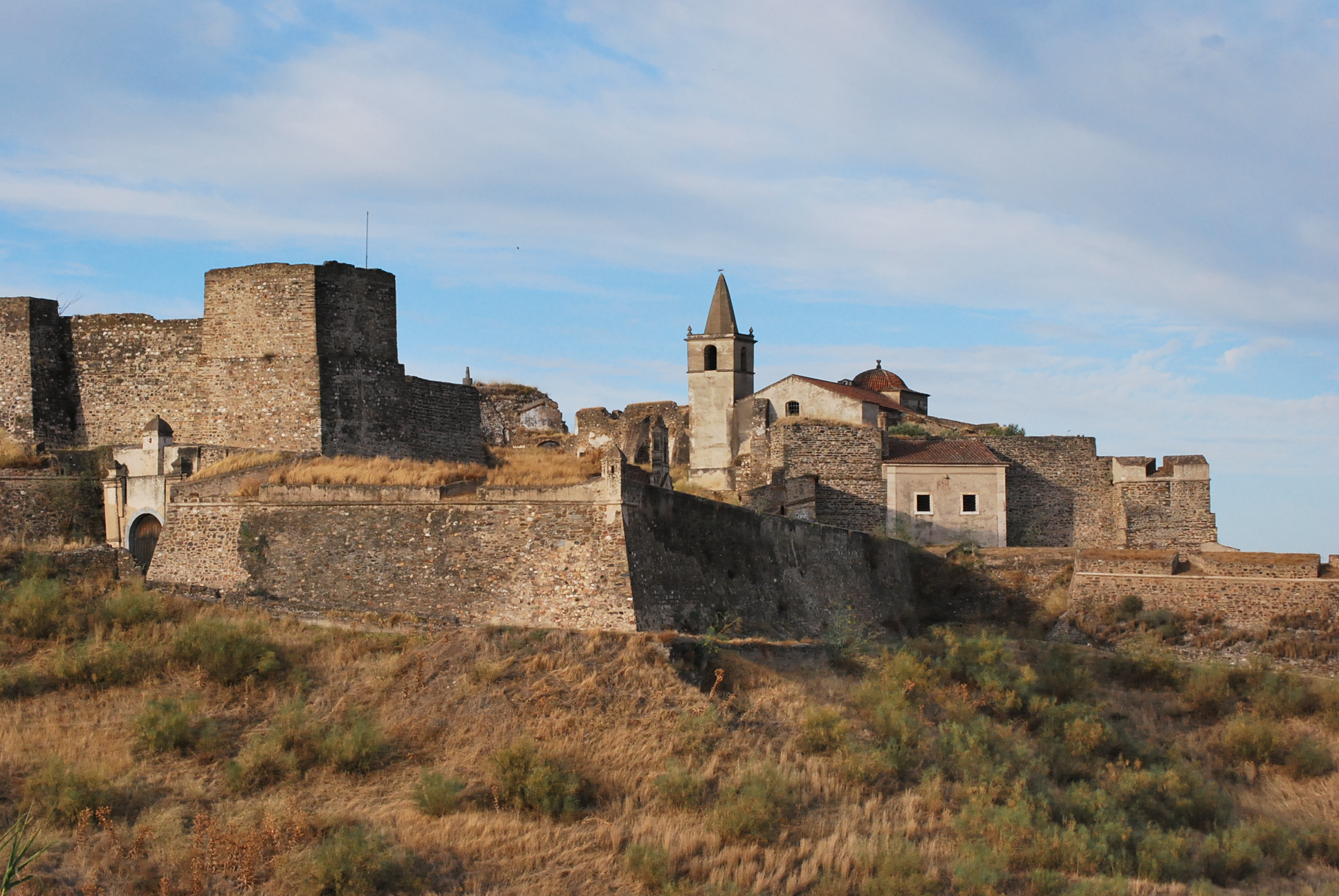
- Interactive map of the Castle of Juromenha area

General information
- Type: Castle
- Location: Juromenha, Portugal

Castle of Juromenha is a castle in Portugal located in Juromenha, Alentejo region. It is classified by IGESPAR as a Site of Public Interest.
