= Paço de Calheiros =

Palace of Calheiros
- Paço de Calheiros
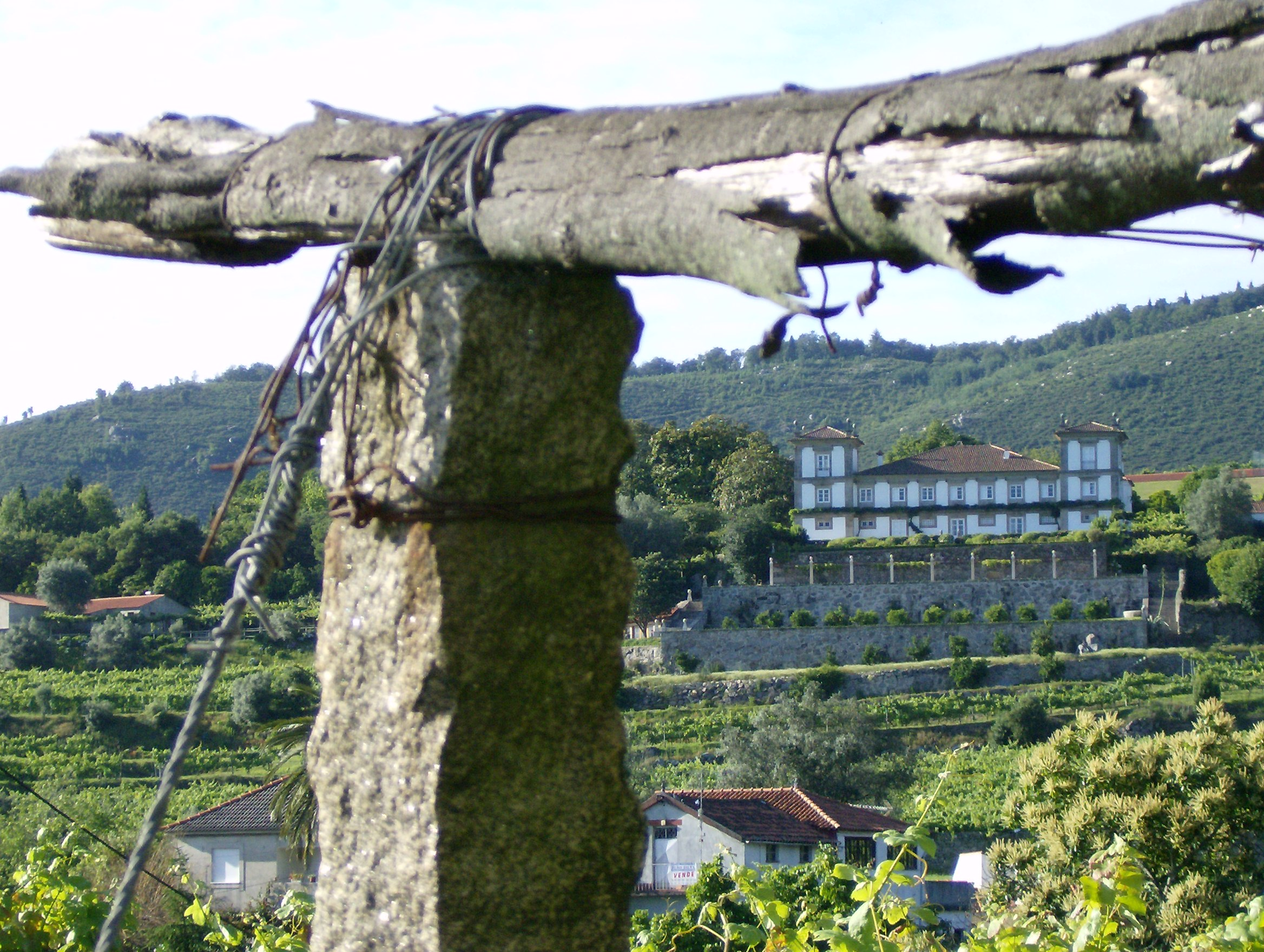
- A dramatic view of the manorhouse of Calheiros in the landscape of Calheiros
- Interactive map of the Palace of Calheiros area

General information
- Type: Manor house
- Architectural style: Baroque
- Location: Calheiros, Portugal
- Coordinates: 41.8064°N 8.5689°W
- Owner: Portuguese Republic

Technical details
- Material: Granite

Design and construction
- Architect: Ernesto Korrodi

The Palace of Calheiros (Portuguese: Paço de Calheiros) is a 17th-century Baroque manorhouse and tourist guesthouse located in the civil parish of Calheiros, municipality of Ponte de Lima, in the northern region of Portugal.

== History ==
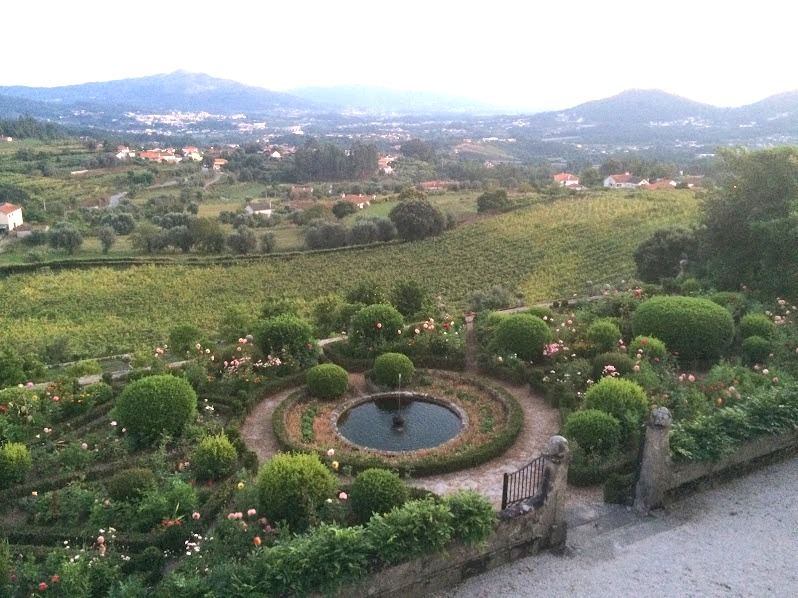
The 19th century garden and view from the hilltop of the Paço de Calheiros

The first records of the noble family of the Calheiros go back to the XI Century, with the famous troubadour Fernão Rodrigues de Calheiros, one of the main poets of the galaico-portuguese poetry of the time.

By then the main seat of the Calheiros family was the medieval fortified tower located in the same place where nowadays stands the Calheiros Palace, Paço de Calheiros.

Thus the estate belongs to the Calheiros family at least since the 1200s, date of the first written records. Throughout the ages the family members took and active role in serving the country in the military, the diplomacy, the arts and government, and have kept within the walls of the Calheiros Palace (Paço de Calheiros) the memories of the years that go back to the foundation of Portugal and the Portuguese Global Empire.

The family welcomes pilgrims in the estate since the medieval times, when they were sheltered and protected on the way to Santiago. Paço de Calheiros is mentioned in the Codice Calixtino en los Caminos de Santiago written by the galician Cândido Pazos, as one of the mandatory stops on the Portuguese Way to Santiago.

In the 17th century the medieval and fortified tower of the Calheiros was demolished and , the construction of the current palace/manorhouse took place, ordered by Francisco Jácome de Calheiros. The Manorhouse construction followed the traditional grandeur of the Portuguese architecture of the time, proudly standing with two towers facing south, which were a symbol of nobility and power inherited from the medieval Castles and old fortified towers.

Paço de Calheiros is considered one the finest examples of noble Portuguese architecture, on one hand because it aggregates all the main traditional characteristics of the Portuguese architecture of the 17th century, but also because it introduces innovative features: two main facades and the location of the chapel in the center of one of the facades, instead of on the side as it was customary in other Palaces of the era.

From its location, it is possible to see a great view of the Lima Valley including the town of Ponte de Lima and Viana do Castelo, a wide view that was strategic in the old times and nowadays a majestic view to be enjoyed by the guests that are welcomed in the manor.

The gardens of Paço de Calheiros are classified as Historic Gardens , which include the XIX century jardin à la francaise and the gardens surrounding the manorhouse with many flower and tree species, the fruit tree gardens, the vegetable gardens, the chessnut woods, and the vineyards.

The Manorhouse was restored and opened to tourism and guests in the 1986 by the current Count of Calheiros Francisco Silva de Calheiros e Menezes. It is a member of the Solares de Portugal ManorHouse Association for tourism, and Association of Manorhouses of Portugal.

It currently houses 20 rooms for guests, and includes facilities such as spa, swimming pool and tennis court. The Estate also produces wine of the local and exquisite Vinho Verde grape Loureiro and Vinhão.

== Architecture ==
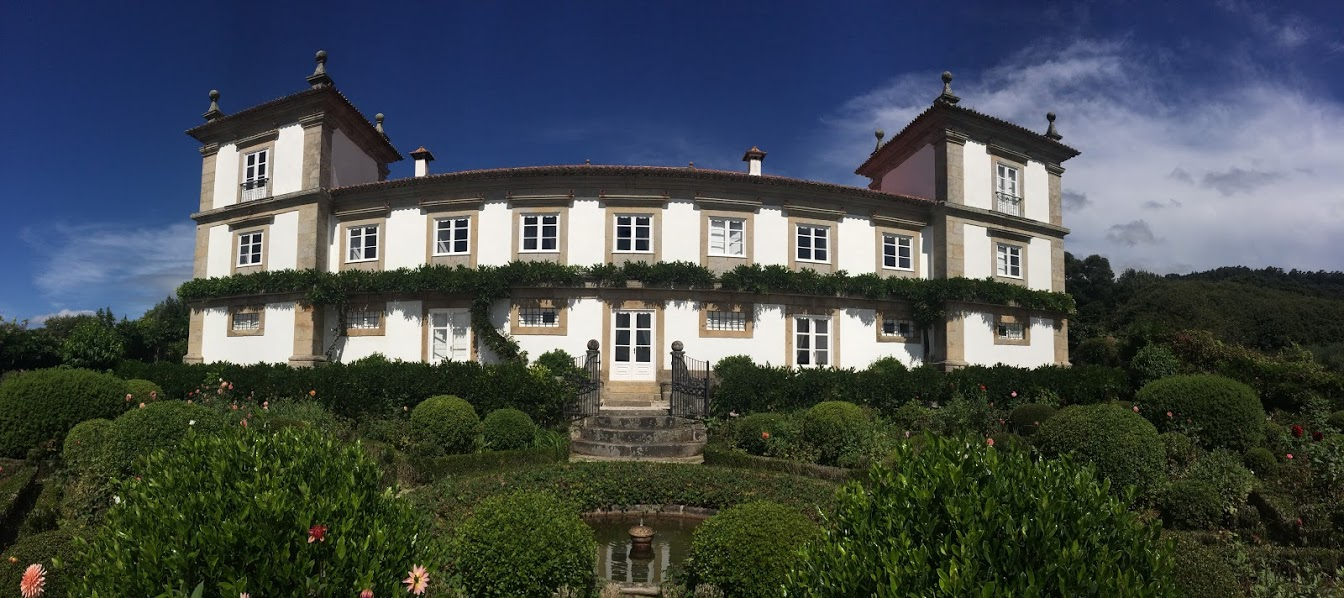
The main Baroque facade of the Paço de Calheiros

The manor is located in an isolated rural hilltop, implanted in the agricultural lands of the estate, its principal facade oriented to the south to the various cultivated lands and the Lima valley. The estate is encircled by high walls, while the main gate is surmounted by sculpted vases and flanked by three grave markers (one in bronze). A laneway of trees leads to the main circular fountain on the estate, while to the left of the laneway there is another fountain addorsed to the wall and crowned by "balls" and a cross with two spouts and coat-of-arms and rectangular tank.

The irregular, rectangular plan consisting of two facades: a frontispiece, that forms a gentle "U"-shape with central chapel acting as annex, a square tower in the extreme southwest, that complements another symmetrical tower, and articulated volumes of roof tile. The two-storey frontispiece is divided into three sections, with the left unit simple with windows and framed doorways and cornerstones. The central section, is inset, preceded by a three-flight staircase with two wings that connect to various sections. In it is the chapel, marked on the exterior by a cornice over pilaster and bell tower with cross over tile, surmounted by rectangular door interrupted by a frontispiece and window. The chapel includes a high-choir and retable with gilded woodwork. The third section is partially aligned with the second section, is formed by a covered varanga, with columns over two arches, forming an angle and addorsed by one of the towers. The lateral right facade has a central wing consisting of two storeys, separated by friezes with three doors and three low windows on the first floor and windows surmounted by cornices on the second. The square towers on the extremes are three storeys tall, separated by friezes with fenestrations on the first and second floors, similar to the central wing, and high windows on the third storey. Balls over plinths accentuate the cornerstones and pilasters.

Near the facade, in a lower terrace is the private gardens, marked by a central circular fountain. These gardens were classified as a historic structure by the Associação Portuguesa dos Jardins Históricos (Portuguese Association of Historic Gardens). In addition, the garden includes a swimming pool, a tennis court and other tourist installation expanded during the course of transforming the site for tourist lodging. In addition, there is a large vineyard that produces local Vinho Verde, supported by varieties of Loureiro (white) and the Vinhão (red), both typical of the region.
