= BGZ =

BGZ may refer to:

- Braga Airport, Portugal (by IATA code)
- Banggai language (by ISO 639 code)
- BGZ Bank, a former bank in Poland
- BGŻ Arena, a velodrome in Pruszków, Poland
