= Rafael Alves =

Rafael Alves may refer to:

- Rafael Alves (fighter), born 1990, Brazilian mixed martial artist
- Rafael Alves (footballer, born 1985), Brazilian footballer who plays as a defender
- Rafael Alves (footballer, born 1994), Portuguese footballer who plays as a goalkeeper
