= Castle of Leiria =

Castle in Leiria, Portugal

Coordinates: 39.747°N 8.810°W

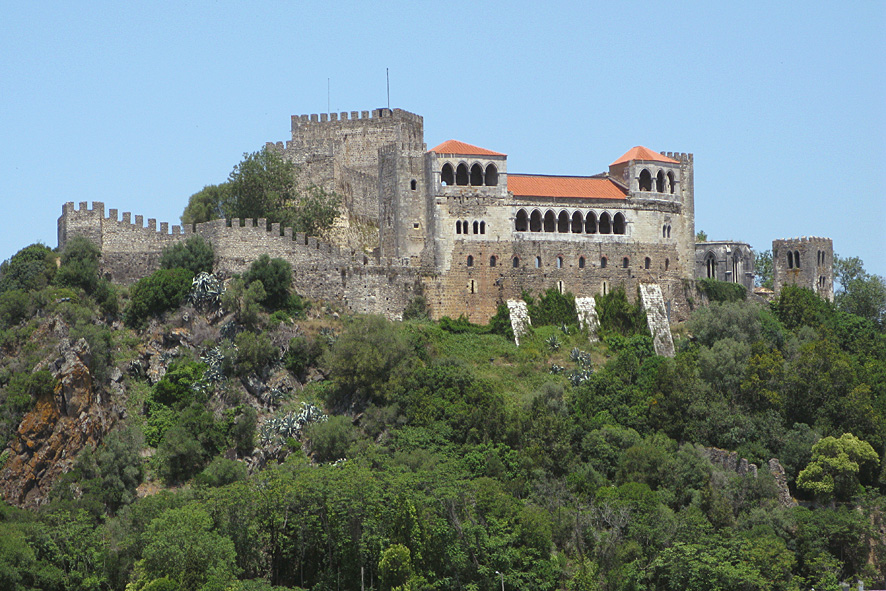
Castle of Leiria

The Castle of Leiria (Portuguese: Castelo de Leiria) is a medieval castle in the civil parish of Leiria, Pousos, Barreira e Cortes, municipality of Leiria, Beira Litoral.

== History ==
The castle of Leiria was built by D. Afonso Henriques for the purpose of creating a line of defense against the Arabs. In 1142 he reinforced the defense of the castle after regaining Leiria. D. Sancho I ordered erection of the walls of the castle in 1195. In 1324 D. Dinis ordered construction of the keep (Tower of Menagem) which was completed only during the reign of D. Afonso IV. In the early 16th century D. Manuel ordered a sacristy to be built between the main chapel and the bell tower.

Throughout the centuries the castle gradually lost its military value. It was badly damaged during the French invasion. At the end of the 19th century restoration of the castle started in 1915 by the initiative of Liga dos Amigos do Castelo. The restoration project was directed by Ernesto Korrodi between 1921 and 1933, and then by Baltazar de Vastro.

The castle hosted important events as the meetings of the first courts called by D. Afonso III; became the residence of D. Denis and Queen Elizabeth; transformed into a meeting venue for the new court in the reign of D. Ferdinand I and the marriage of D. João I's son D. Afonso was celebrated in this castle as well.

It has been listed as a National monument since 1910.

The castle was damaged by the 1969 earthquake.

In 2026, the castle was severely damaged by Storm Kristin with a reported damage of €10 million.

== Architecture ==
The present configuration of the castle of Leiria was influenced by the 4 major construction periods: the 12th century's Romanesque, the 14th century's Gothic Dionysus, the early 15th century's Gothic Johannine and the restoration trends of late 19th and early 20th century.

The shape of the castle is irregular polygonal with solid walls and towers. Paços Reais (Royal Palace), the Church of Nossa Senhora da Pena, Menagem Tower, the former Collegiate space, and medieval barns are located inside the complex. The castle has 4 floors; the lower two floors are hardly seen from outside and are intended for domestic services. There is a large loggia with eight arches of twin capitals. The loggia has the panorama over the city and was used as a place for leisure and socializing. The loggia is accessed through a room called Royal Hall or Noble Hall which has a total area of 130 square meters used for receptions by monarchs.

Stonemasonry, brick and concrete were used in the construction.

== Gallery ==
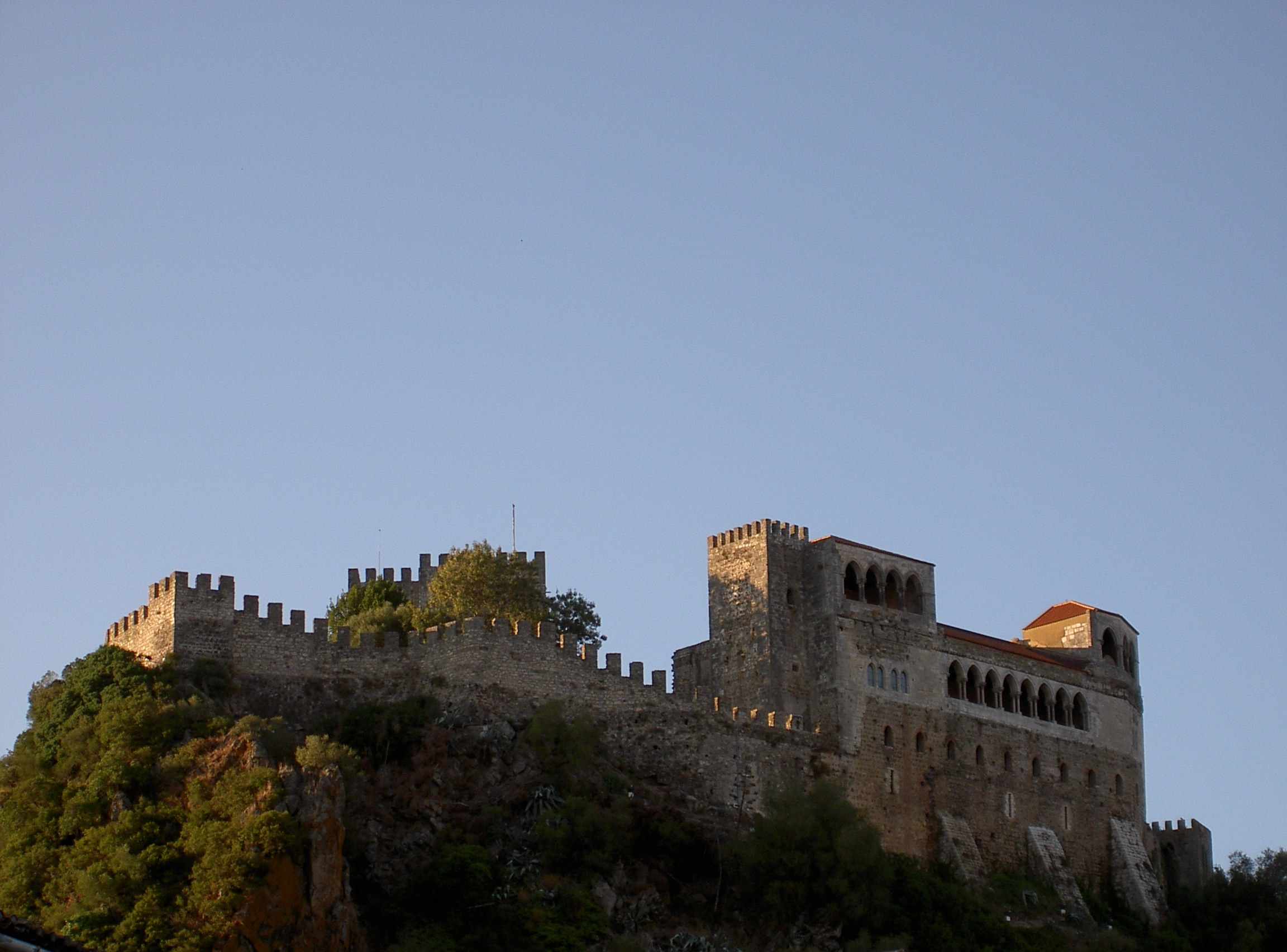
Castle of Leiria

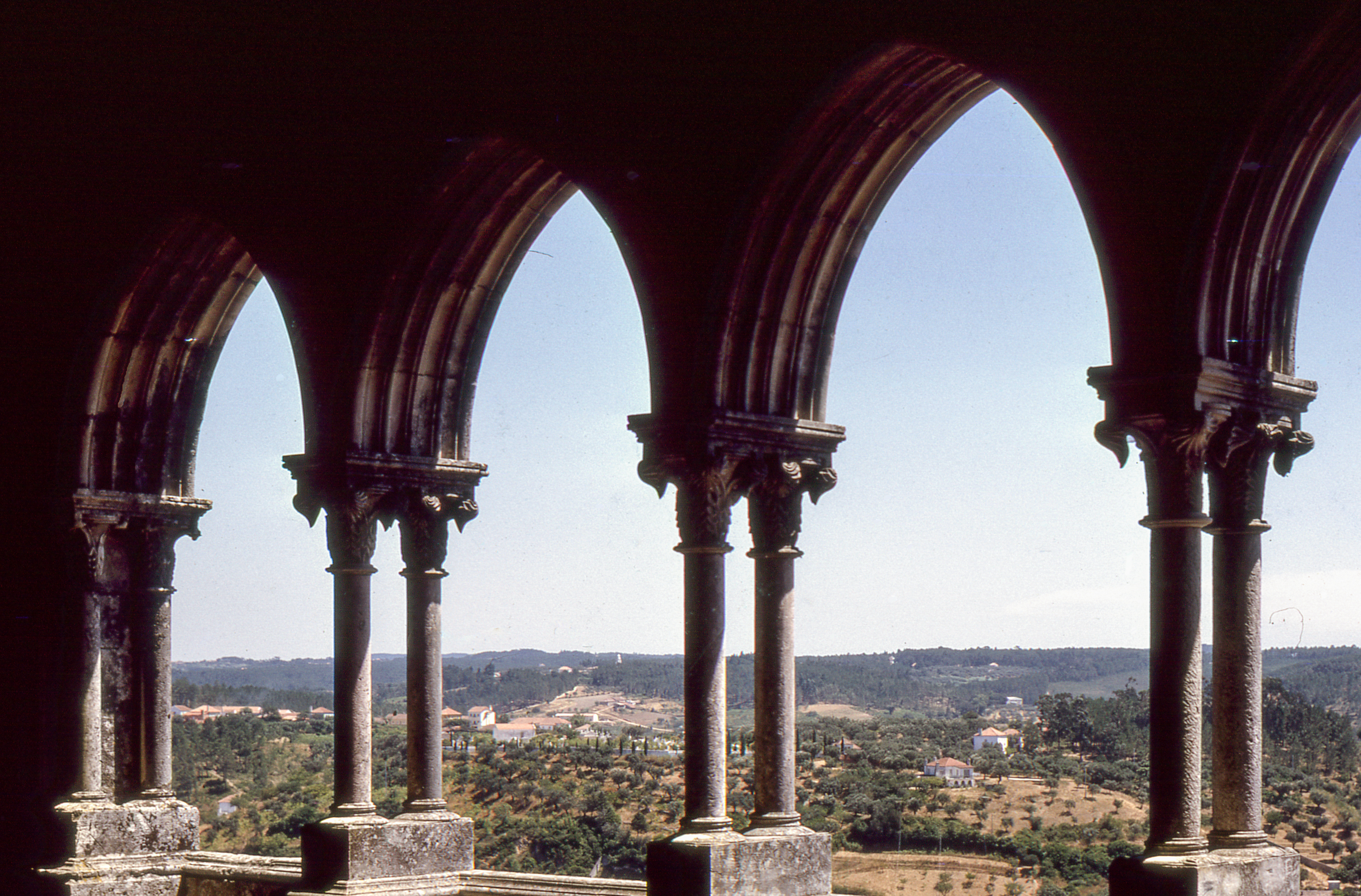
Gothic arcade (restored) of the Palace of D. João I

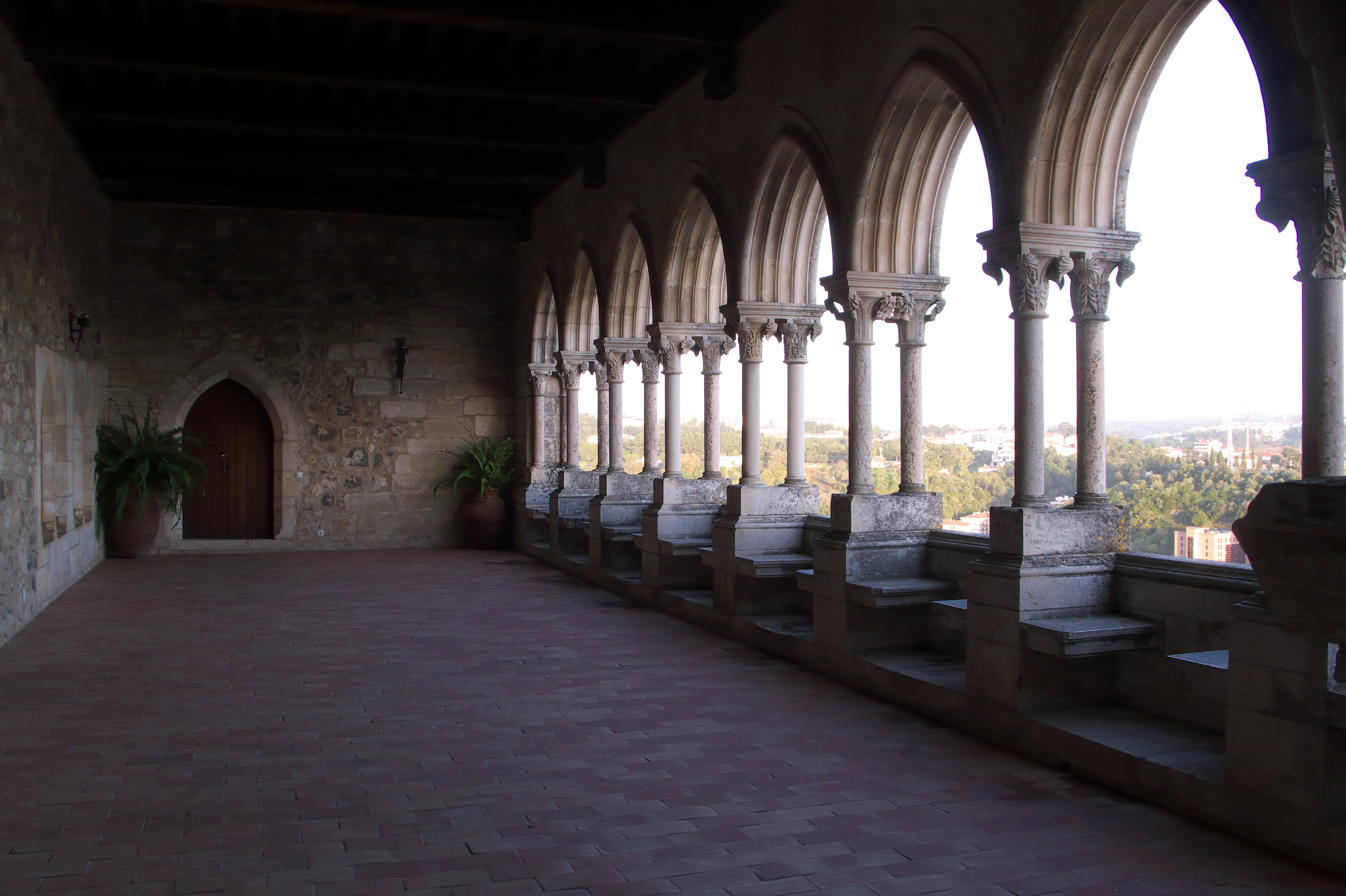
Loggia

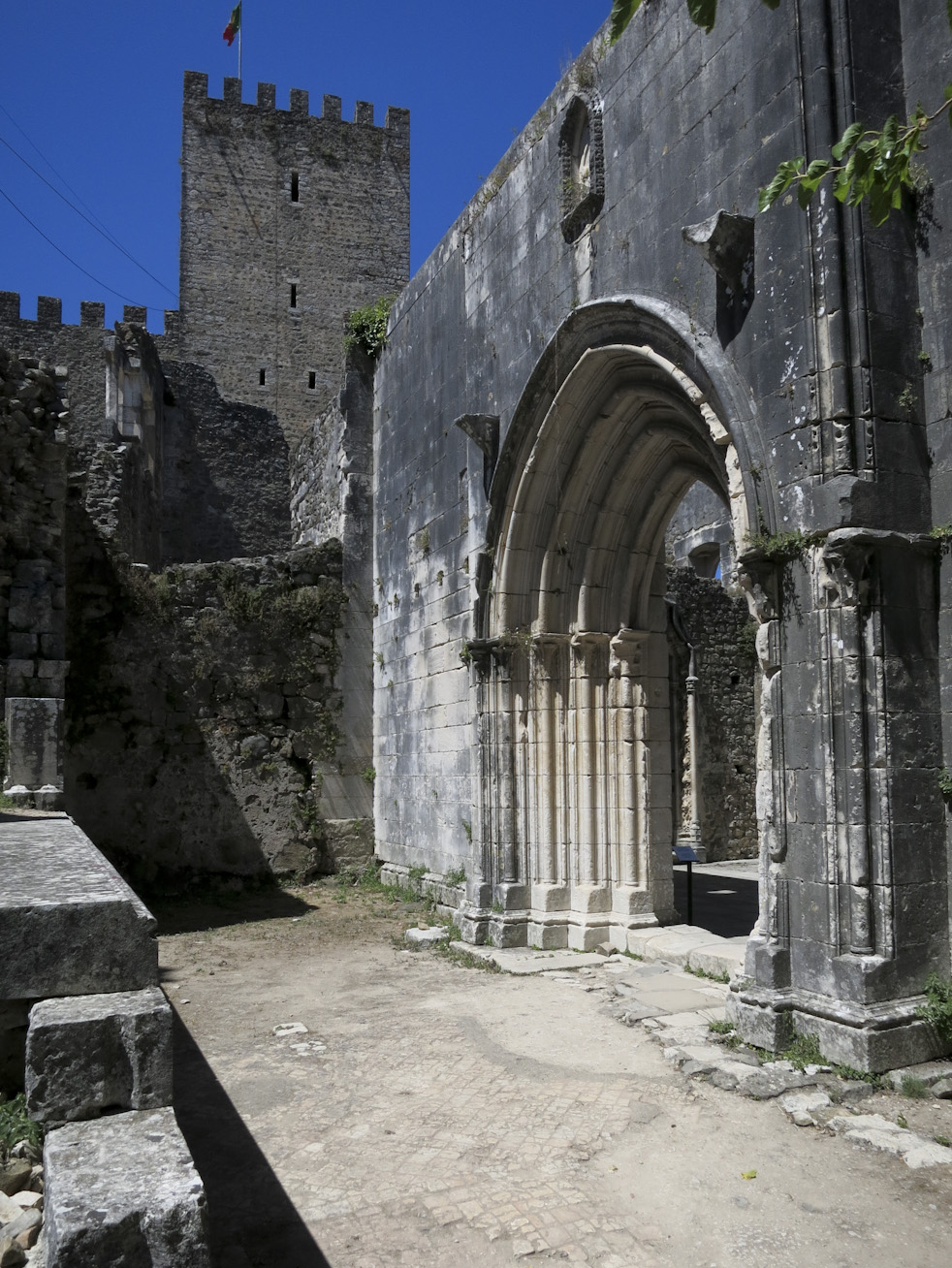
Church of Nossa Senhora da Pena

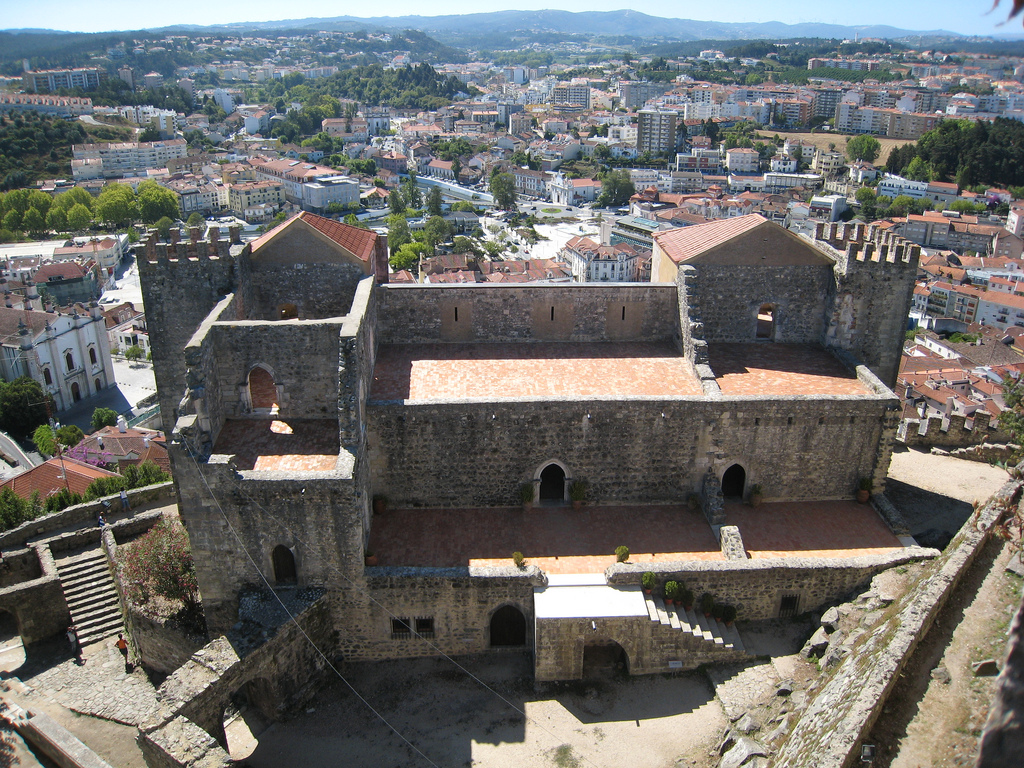

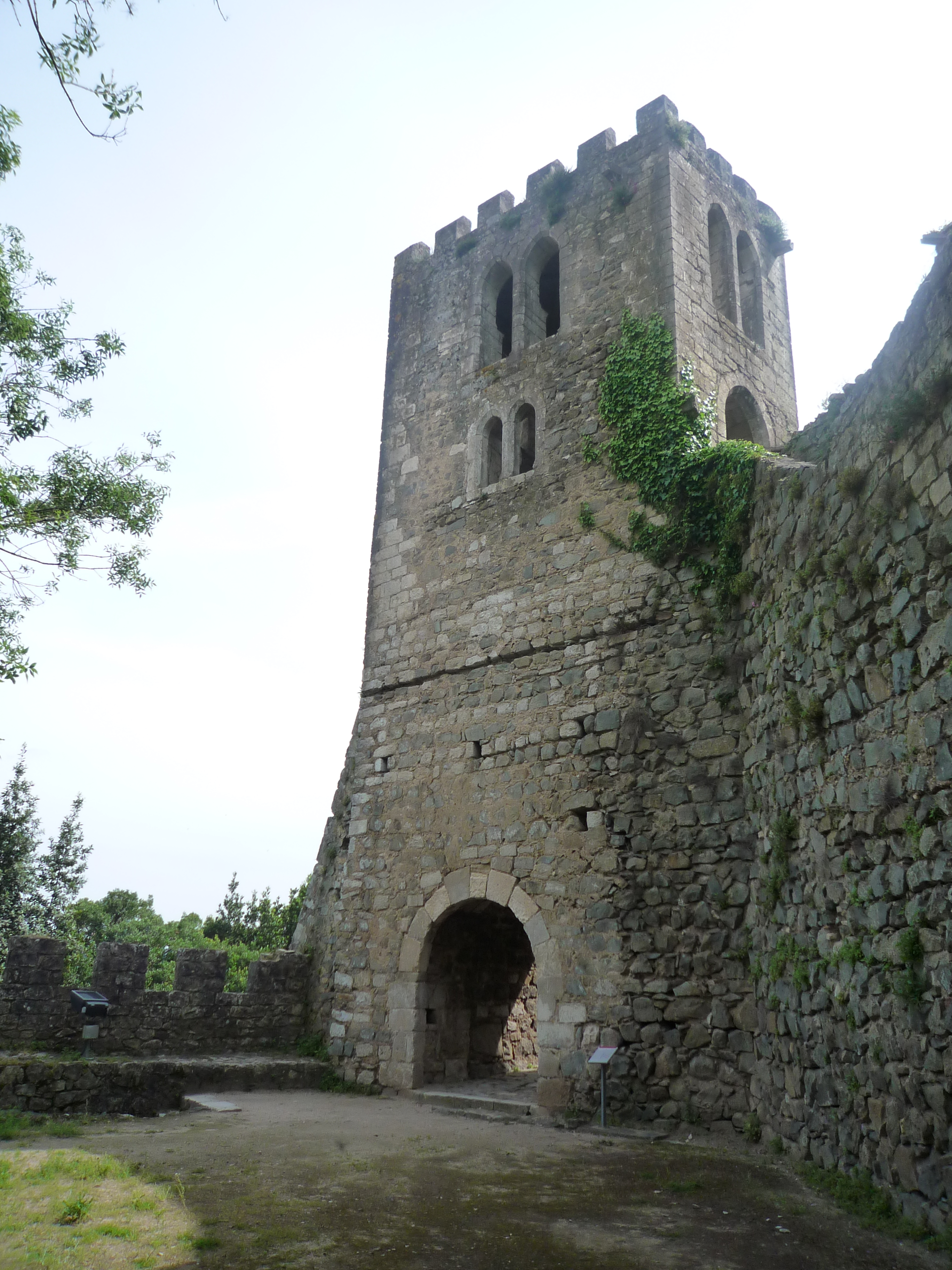
Bell tower

== See also ==
- Castles in Portugal
- Castle of Alcobaça
- Castle of Alfeizerão
