= Palmeira (Braga) =

- Civil parish
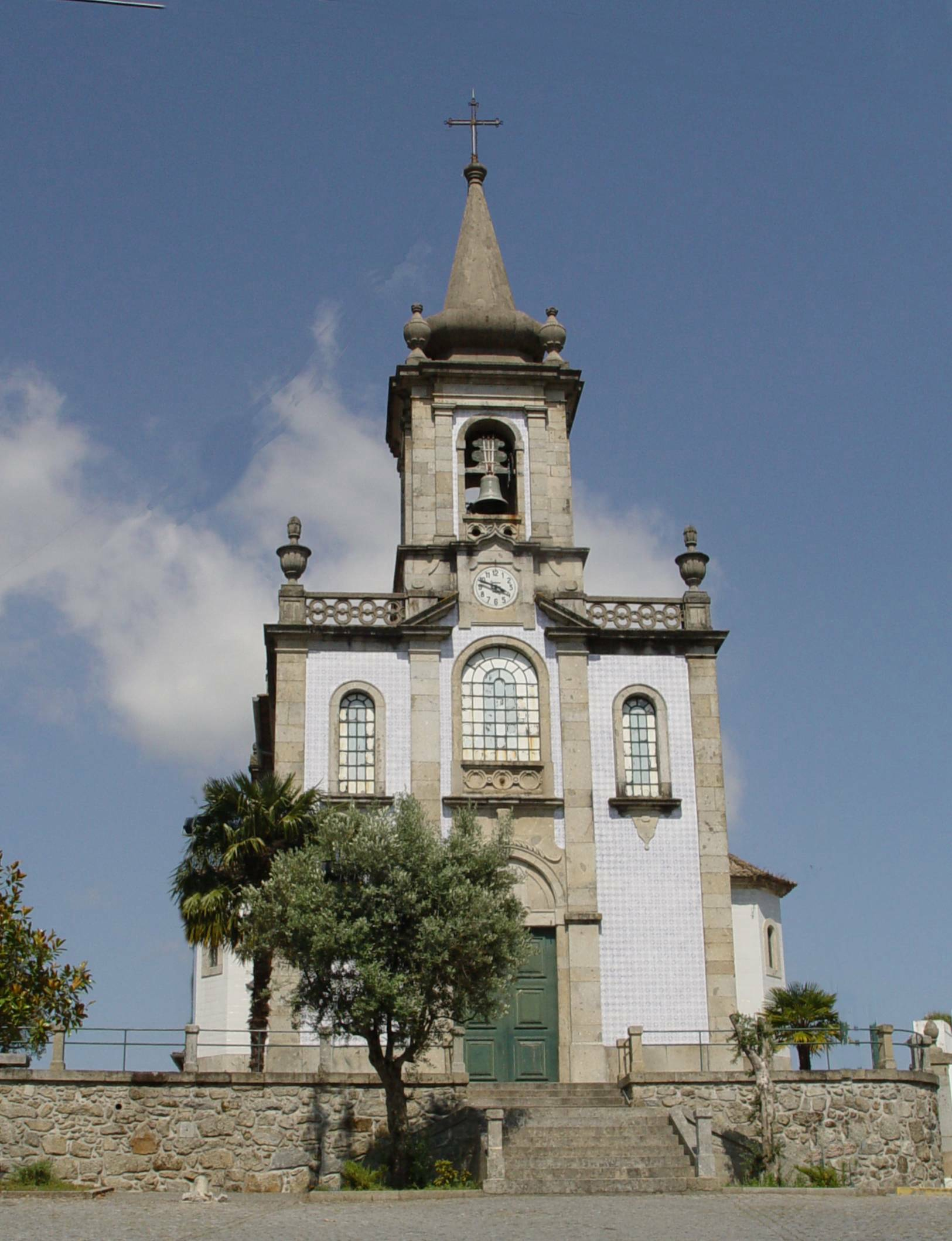
- Palmeira Church

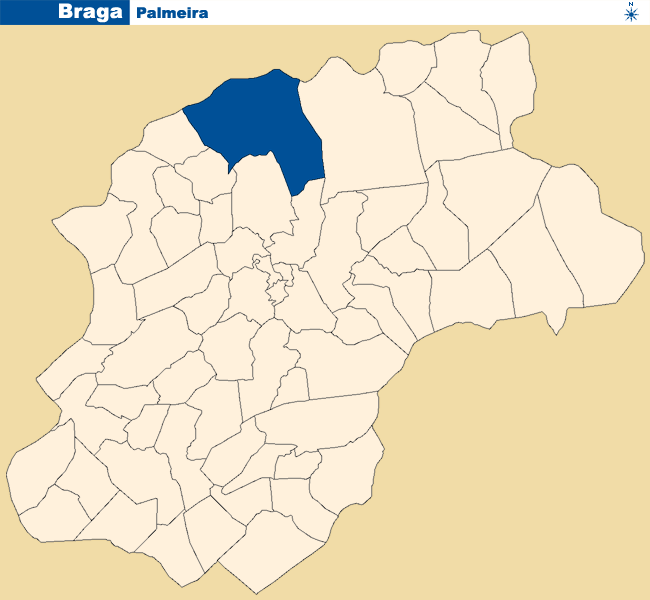
- Coordinates: 41.594°N 8.429°W
- Country: Portugal
- Region: Norte
- Intermunic. comm.: Cávado
- District: Braga
- Municipality: Braga

Area
  - Total: 8.88 km^{2} (3.43 sq mi)

Population (2011)
  - Total: 5,468
  - Density: 616/km^{2} (1,590/sq mi)
- Time zone: UTC+00:00 (WET)
  - Summer (DST): UTC+01:00 (WEST)

Palmeira is a Portuguese parish, located in the municipality of Braga. The population in 2011 was 5,468, in an area of 8.88 km^{2} (3.43 sq mi). It is located near the Cávado river, on the south bank, about 5 mi (8.0 km) north from the historic center of the city of Braga.

Braga Airport (Aérodromo Municipal de Braga)(BGZ) is located in Palmeira. The Circuito Vasco Sameiro is located at the airport.

== Main sights ==
- Dona Chica Castle (Castelo de Dona Chica), from Ernesto Korrodi.
- Cávado rivervalley
