= Rafael Alves (footballer, born 1994) =

Portuguese footballer

Personal information
- Full name: Rafael Salgado Alves
- Date of birth: 4 January 1994 (age 32)
- Place of birth: Palmeira, Portugal
- Height: 1.89 m (6 ft 2 in)
- Position: Goalkeeper

Team information
- Current team: Dumiense

Youth career
- 2002–2005: Palmeiras Braga
- 2005–2013: Braga

Senior career*
Years	Team	Apps	(Gls)
2013–2014	Braga B	0	(0)
2013–2014	→ Coimbrões (loan)	2	(0)
2014–2016	União Madeira	2	(0)
2016–2017	Aves	1	(0)
2017–2020	Vizela	32	(0)
2020–2021	PAEEK	29	(0)
2021–2022	Trofense	0	(0)
2022	Académico de Viseu	3	(0)
2022–2023	Vitória FC	5	(0)
2023	→ AD Fafe (loan)	6	(0)
2023–	→ Dumiense	0	(0)

International career
2009	Portugal U15	1	(0)
2009	Portugal U16	2	(0)
- * Club domestic league appearances and goals as of 6 August 2023

Rafael Salgado Alves (born 4 January 1994) is a Portuguese footballer who plays as a goalkeeper for Campeonato de Portugal club Dumiense.

== Club career ==
On 31 August 2021, he joined Trofense.
