= Calheiros =

Calheiros is a surname. Notable people with the surname include:

- Renan Calheiros (born 1955), Brazilian politician
- Waldyr Calheiros Novaes (1923–2013), Brazilian Roman Catholic bishop
- Hamílton Hênio Ferreira Calheiros (born 1980), known simply as Hamílton, Brazilian professional footballer, also naturalized as Togolese in 2003
- Sebastião Lopes de Calheiros e Meneses (1816-1899), Portuguese colonial administrator

== See also ==
- Paço de Calheiros
