= Castelo da Dona Chica =

Castle of Dona Chica
- Castelo da Dona Chica
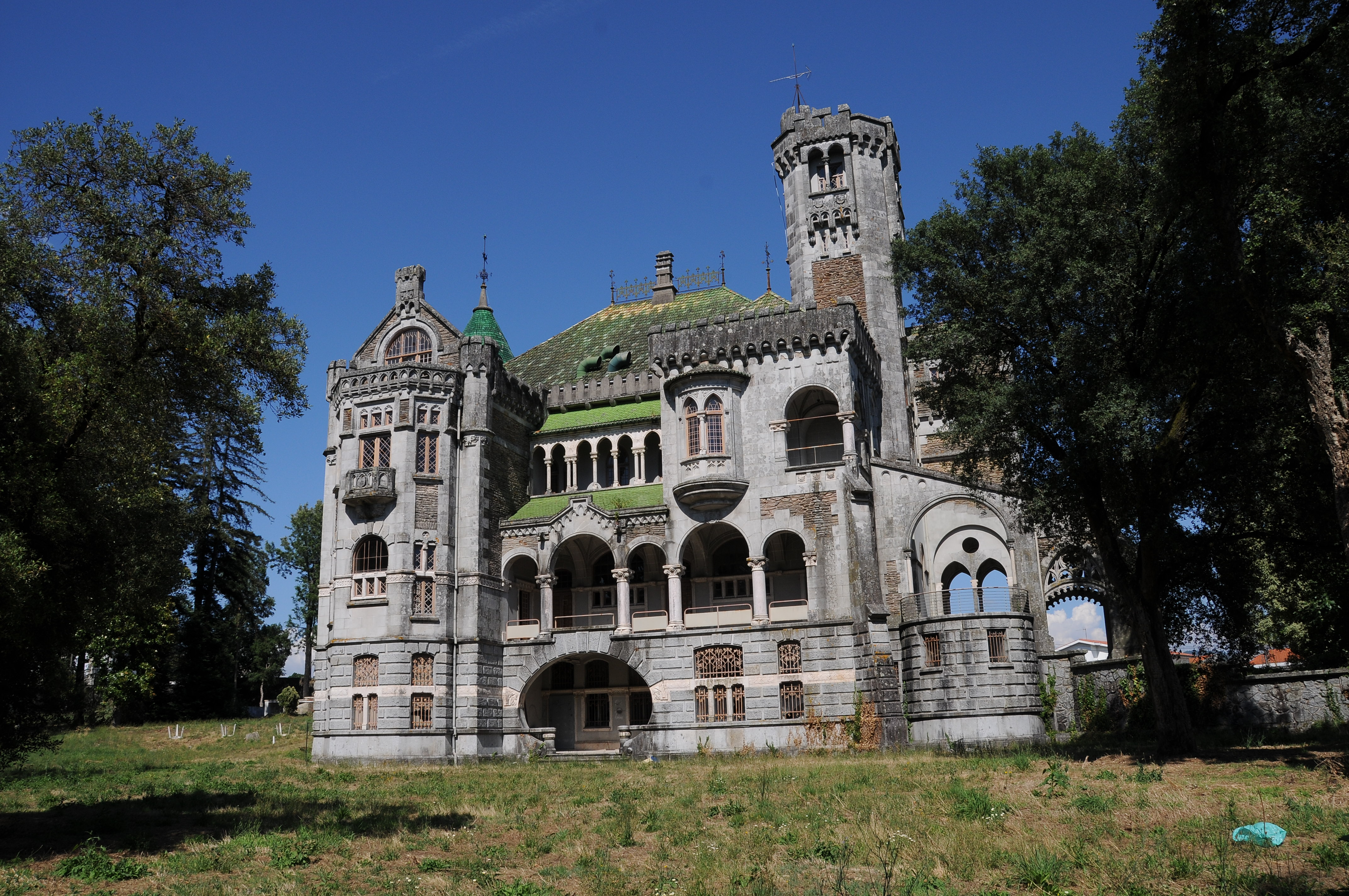
- The Neo-romantic residence of Dona Chica, showing a mixture of influences stylized to produce an aesthetic common to the early 20th century
- Interactive map of the Castle of Dona Chica area

General information
- Type: Manor house (Solar)
- Architectural style: Northern Portuguese manorial
- Location: Braga, Portugal
- Coordinates: 41°35′19.64″N 8°25′41.47″W
- Opened: c. 1915
- Owner: Private|Private

Technical details
- Material: Granite

The Castle of Dona Chica (Portuguese: Castelo da Dona Chica) is a neo-romantic castle and/or residence located in the civil parish of Palmeira, municipality of Braga, in the northern region of Portugal. Originally designed by Ernesto Korrodi, the project suffered from a lack of funds early, eventually changing hands and falling into the possession of creditors.

== History ==
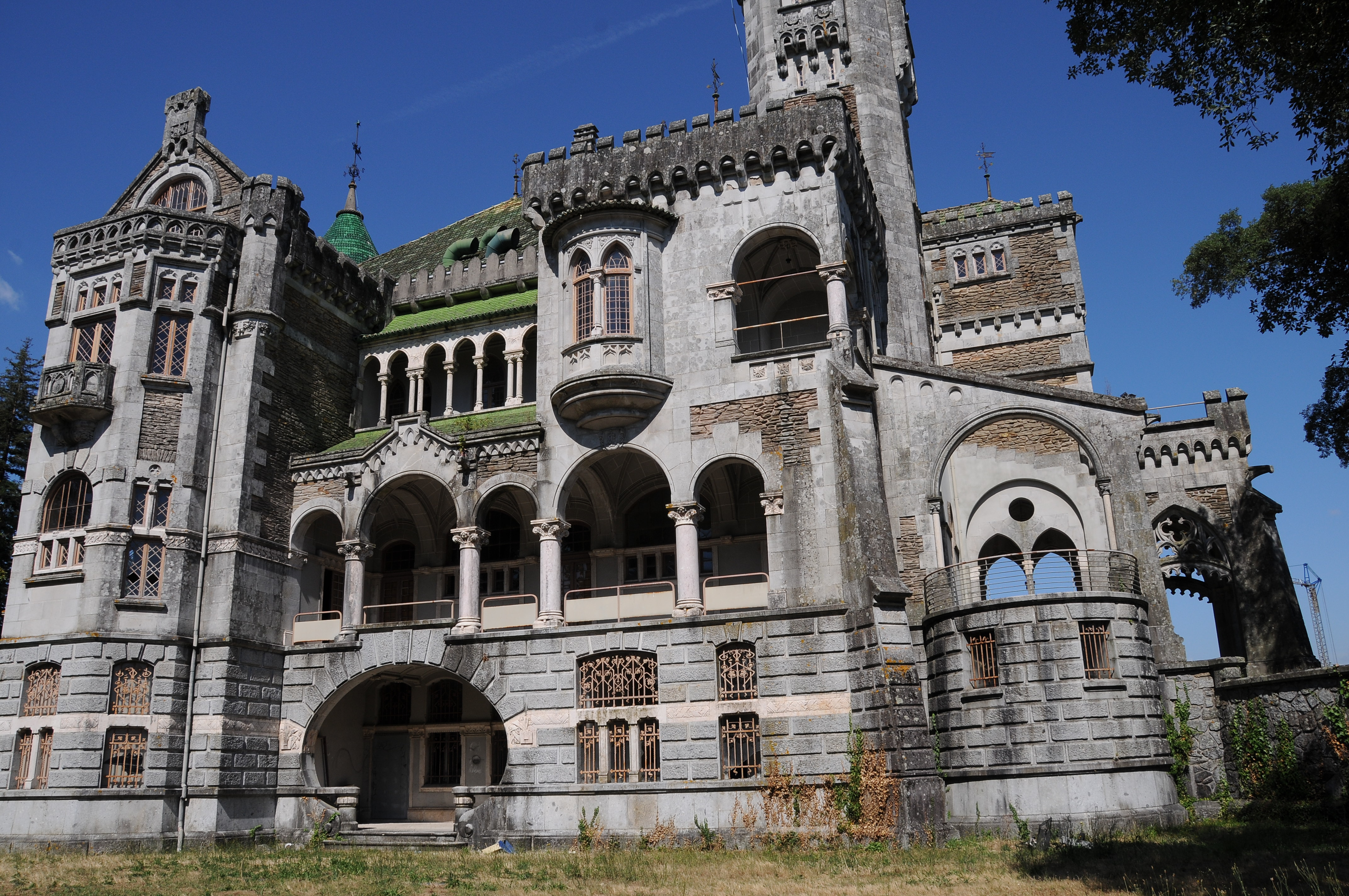
Western facade and entrance portico, showing the three floors and colonnade porch

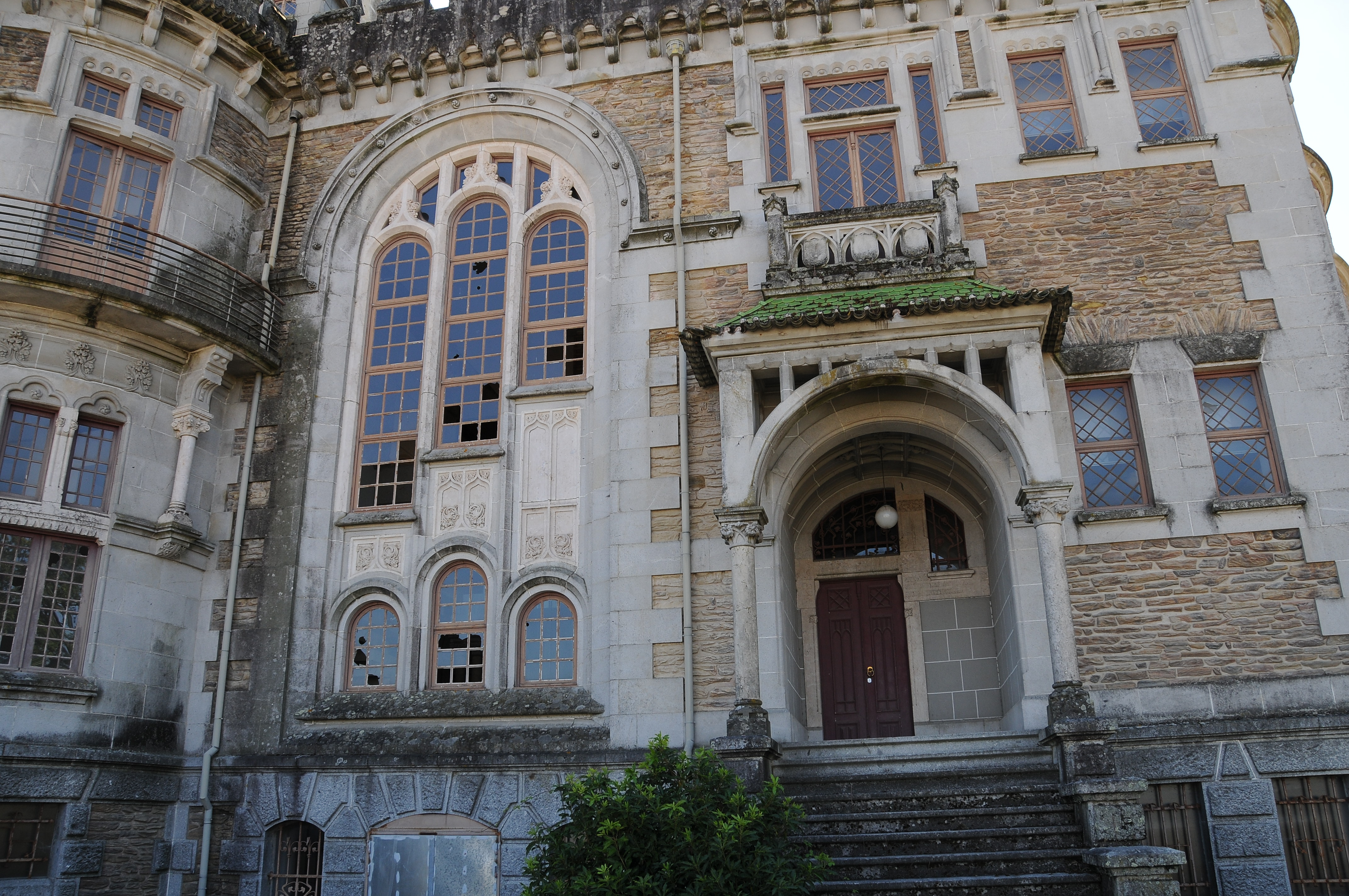
Detail of the front entrance, showing the large arcade windows

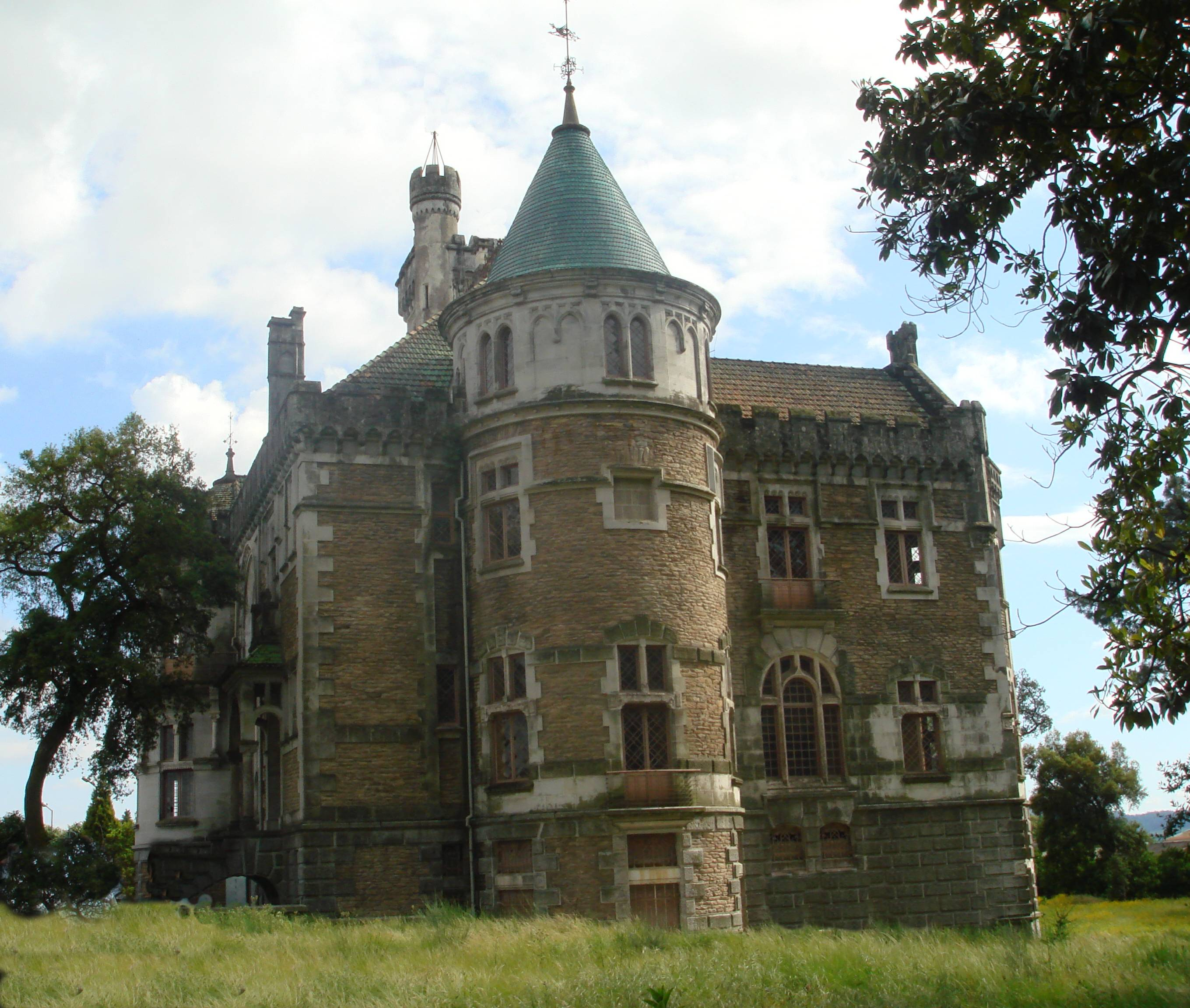
The rounded tower along the northern facade

The project was conceived and executed in 1915, by Swiss architect (and later naturalized Portuguese) Ernesto Korrodi, under contract with João José Ferreira Rego, then married to a Brazilian lady named Francisca Peixoto Rego. The castle's name came from the patroness, whose diminutive form (Chica) was the origin of its popular name; Francisca Peixoto Rego was active in the import of many of the arboreal plant species from Brazil, used to landscape the property. Korrodi's project was based on his idealized concept of the Habitação Nobre de Província (Provincial Nobles' House), a typology that the architect was dedicated to at the beginning of the 20th century, and which "...evoked, across diverse inspirational sources, one of the art of the Middle Ages and one from a determined social lifestyle, of the triumphal burgers of the 19th century, while grounded in tradition and progress..."

The construction was suspended in 1919, at a time when the interior of the home, was still in a state of basic comforts. Incomplete, its budget rounded 370 contos.

In 1938, it was sold for 165 contos to an English nobleman, who later sold the building to the librarian of the Count of Vizela, Alberto Torres de Figueiredo. Francisco Joaquim Alves de Macedo acquired the palace and restarted the work on the building, without recuperating the already damaged exterior and interior. This project was fruitless and in vain, as multiple divergences developed during the construction and conflicts with the local government authority ensued. In the course of the debacle many of the decorative elements of the interior, principally the ceramics (such as the azulejos, floor-tiles and roofing) were damaged. There remained no vestiges of these elements to assist future work and many of the tiles of artistic value were destroyed, as was the interior woods.

In the second half of the 20th century, the building was acquired directly by the Junta de Freguesia de Palmeira (the civil parish council) which concesstioned the property to IPALTUR Investimentos Turísticos, S.A., under a renewable long-term contract.

In 1992, there was a formal proposal to transform the residence into a cultural and recreative space, with restaurant and other social services, under the direction of architect Paulo Tonet. In November, Joaquim Costa, manager of IPALTUR, transferred title of the palace to the company Veloso - Empreendimentos Turísticos e Residenciais, with the intention of paying alleged debits, which was not acceptable to the remaining creditors.

On 20 February 1985, the property was classified as a Imóvel de Interesse Público (Property of Public Interest).

In 1993, the Caixa Geral de Depósitos, as principal creditor of IPALTUR, petitioned the liquidation of IPALTUR, resulting in an uncertain future for the property, as it mortgaged at the time. Ultimately, it was bought the CGD in 1998, and placed up for sale by 2006. Before being placed up for sale, the local Junta de Freguesia for Palmeira tried to come to an accord with the CGD, offering 165,000 contos for the property, to which the bank refused.

In recent years, the property has entered a new phase of restoration under private ownership. The estate is currently managed by Lifestyle Retreats, a hospitality management company that oversees the conservation efforts and ongoing revitalisation of the castle and its surrounding grounds. https://lifestyleretreats.com/castelo-dona-chica/

== Architecture ==
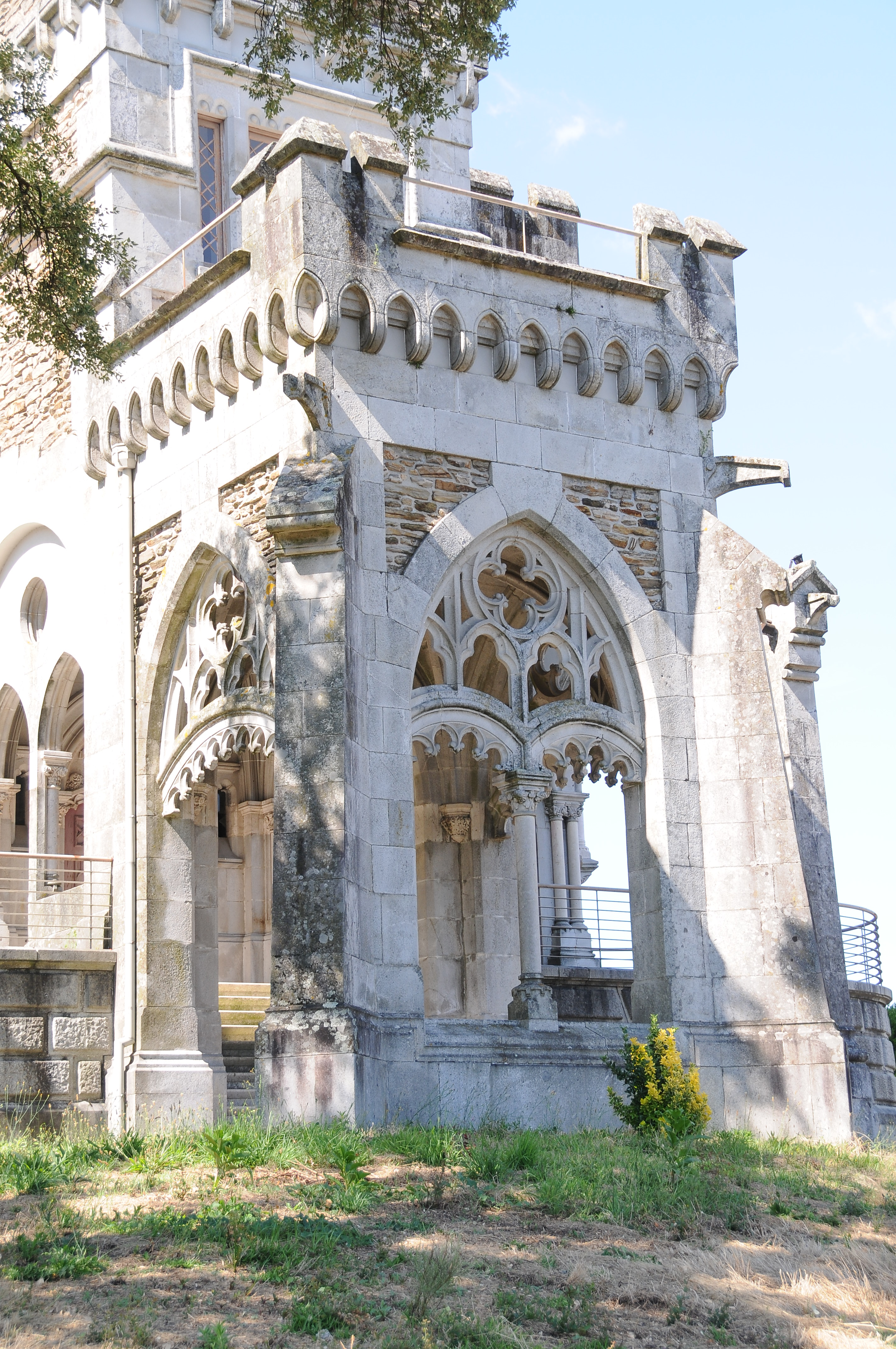
The ornate, Gothic-inspired carriage entrance in the southern facade

The castle is located in a rural property, four kilometres (2.5 mi) from the centre of Braga, on an ample property encircled by wall and dense vegetation.

The four-storey structure and its spaces are a mixture of popular styles and materials, using a diverse palette of styles. Isolated, the spaces have specific aesthetics, connected using bridging elements (materials and decorative themes). From the analysis of the constructive details, one can descern the importance that image had in its construction. The windows are wood or iron, or still, executed with both materials, making it difficult to determine whether their treatment was part of the building's construction or if they were part of the architectural design of the architect Korrodi. In contrast, the roof tiles are signed by the designer, while their colour (green) integrates into the landscape, something the rest of the building refuse to do.

The surrounding forest, includes several exotic species (such as the medicinal plant Pau Santo, Brazilian almond and pine trees), in addition to various national species (like palm, eyucalyptus, maple, wild pine, chestnut, Portuguese cedar, camellia, Mimosa), with pedestrian trails. Also, the site includes a small lake with grotto, that includes fake stalagtities following the Romantic-style, attempting to mimic the medieval era. The space is the logical consequence of a romantic attitude that aimed to emulate the medieval, in pursuit of a language of national purity, as well as emulating nature, preferring the 'woodland' to the geometrical Baroque garden.

Although the structure shows a few solutions that differ from the Korrodi original design, this "evolution" marked "...a persistence of taste, that permitted the materialization of the Korrodi's Habitação Nobre ideal, which were referenced in the Neo-Gothic elements. In fact, the residence has influences from not only the Founders' Chapel in Batalha, but also mixed elements from Art Nouveau, Renaissance and Romanesque.
