= Castle of Alcobaça =

Castle in Alcobaça, Portugal

Coordinates: 39°33′02″N 8°58′56″W

The Castle of Alcobaça (Portuguese: Castelo de Alcobaça) is a medieval castle in the civil parish of Alcobaça e Vestiaria, municipality of Alcobaça, in the Portuguese district of Leiria.

== History ==
The Castle of Alcobaça is located at a hill about 70 meters high on the left bank of the Baça river. It was rebuilt on the ruins of former fortress by D. Afonso Henriques in 1147. The castle was damaged by the Moors in 1191–1195. In the 12th to 13th century D.Sancho ordered to rebuild the castle for the monks of Alcobaça and the inhabitants of this area defending against future attacks. In 1369 the castle was reinforced with a barbican by the Abbot of Alcobaça D. Frei João de Ornellas and the fallen tower was rebuilt on the side of Monastery. The 1422 earthquake damaged the castle, so it was restored in 1424. The Menagem Tower (keep) was remade in 1450 by D. Frei Gonçalo Ferreira.

The castle was destructed by the 1755 earthquake and then again during the reign of D. Maria II in the 19th century. In 1952-1953 the wall of the castle facing the Monastery was reconstructed. The cleaning work of the castle and surrounding area, as well as works on the road finished in 1956 on the occasion of the visit of Queen Elizabeth.

The Castle of Alcobaça was also used as a prison. There are only its ruins remaining which has been classified by IGESPAR as a Property of Public Interest since 1978.

== Gallery ==
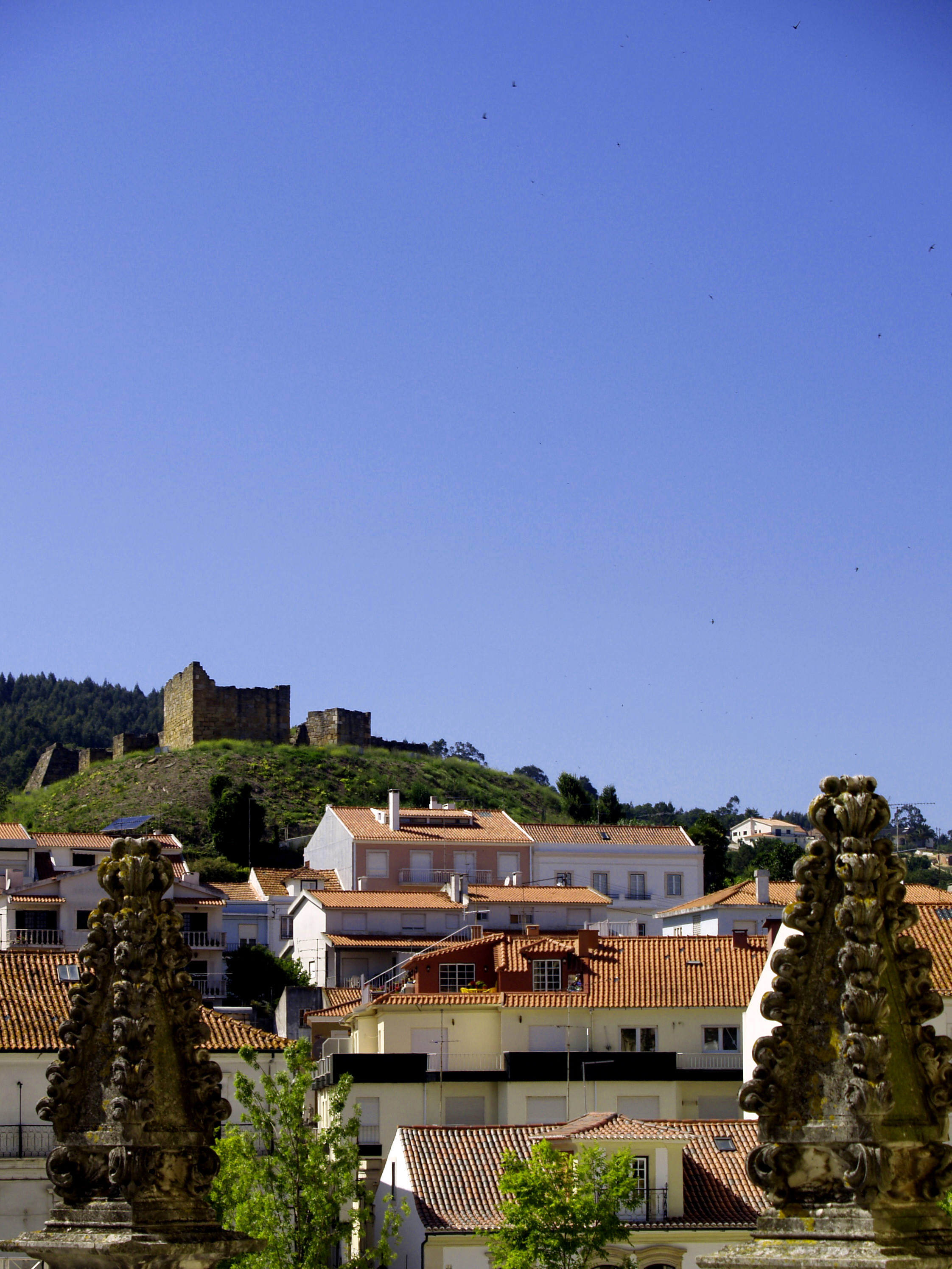

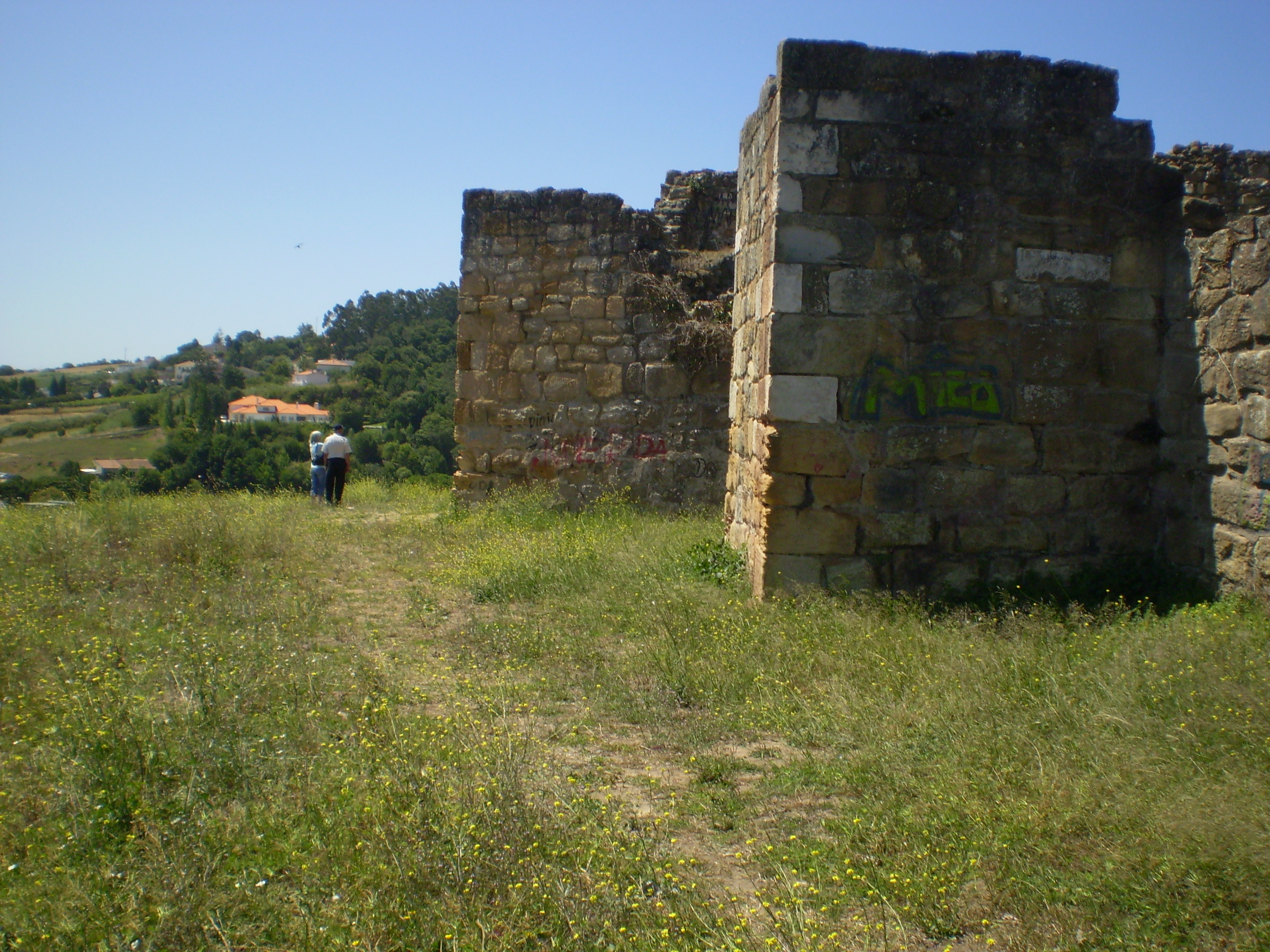

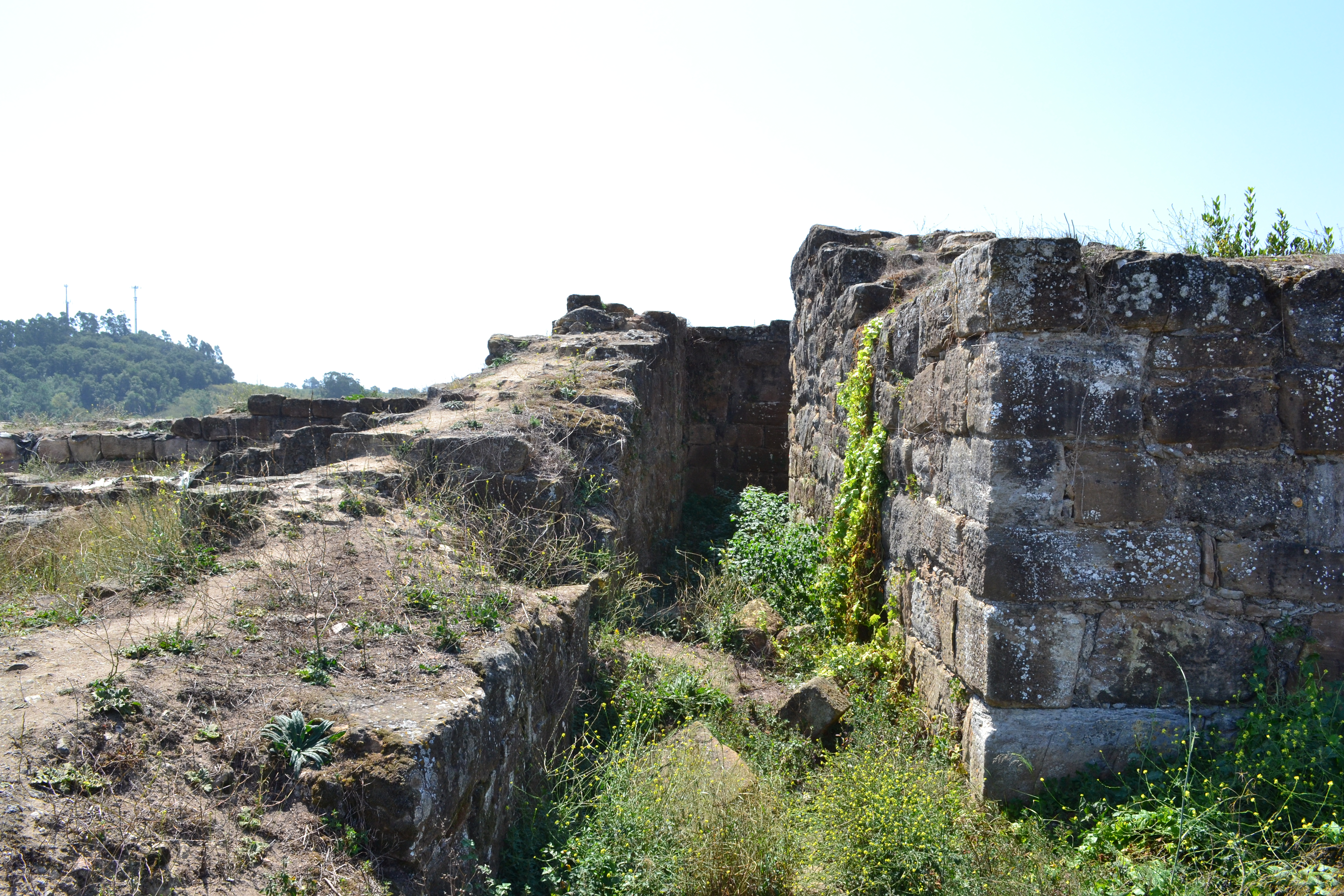

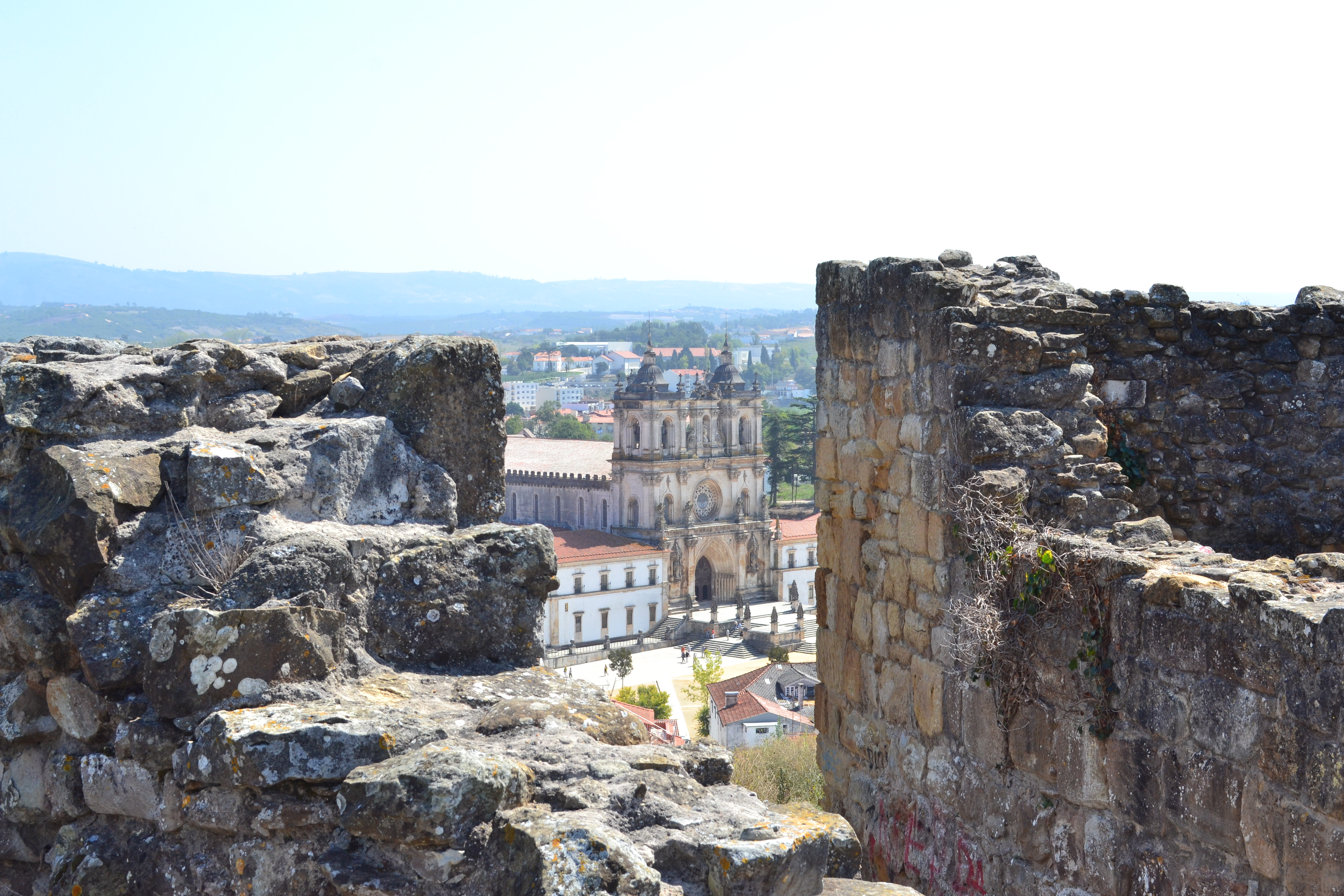

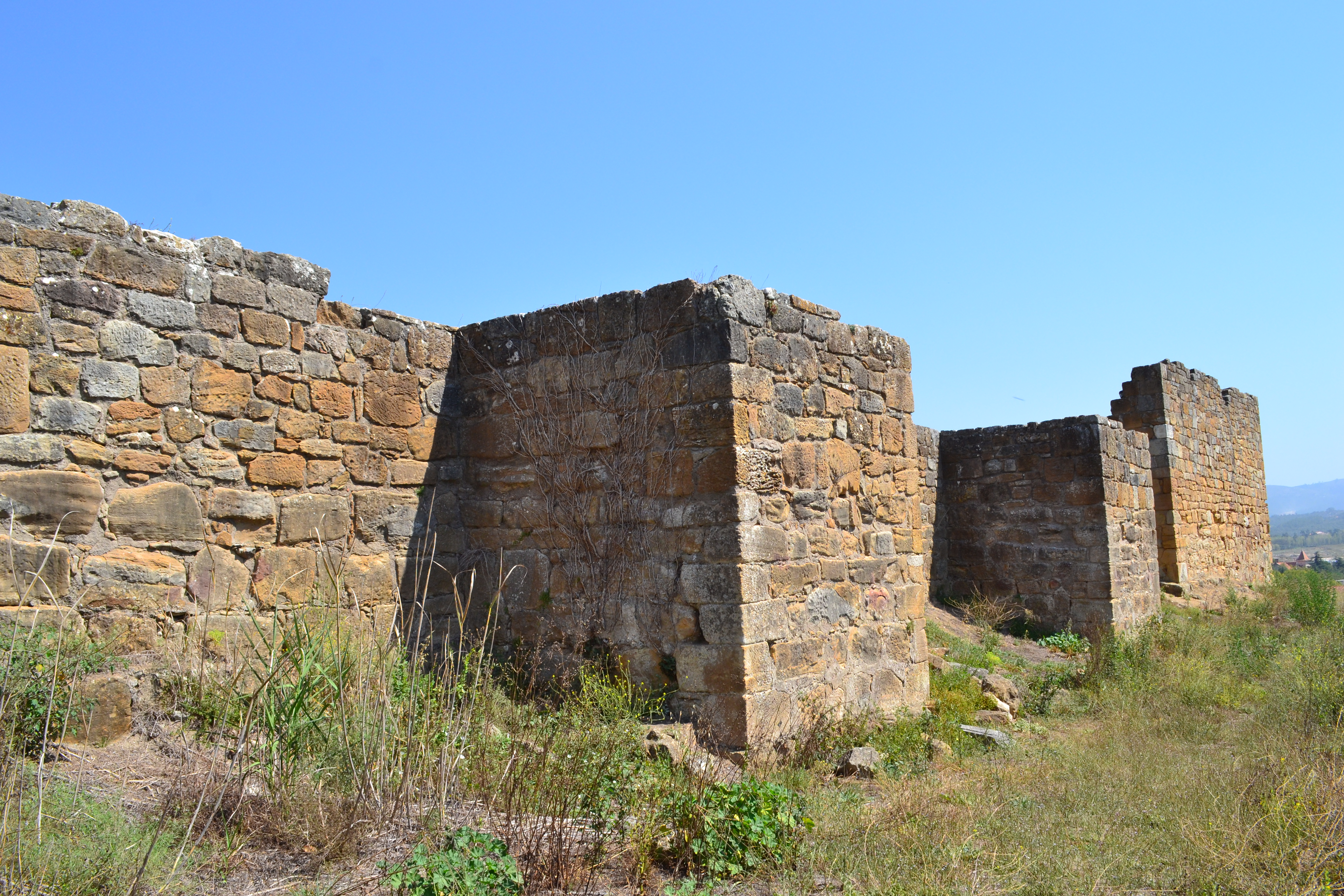

== See also ==
- Alcobaça Monastery
- Castle of Leiria
