= Braga Airport =

Braga Airport Aeródromo Municipal de Braga
- IATA: BGZ; ICAO: LPBR

Summary
- Serves: Braga, Portugal
- Location: Palmeira
- Elevation AMSL: 74 m / 243 ft
- Coordinates: 41°35′13″N 008°26′42″W

Map
- Location in Portugal

Runways
Direction	Length		Surface
Direction	m	ft	Surface
07/25	939	3,081	Asphalt
- Source: AIP

Braga Airport (IATA: BGZ, ICAO: LPBR) is an airport in Palmeira, 3 km (1.9 mi) north northwest of Braga, Portugal.

== See also ==
- Transport in Portugal
- List of airports in Portugal
