= Castle of Alfeizerão =

Portuguese medieval castle

- Castelo de Alfeizerão
- Centro of Portugal
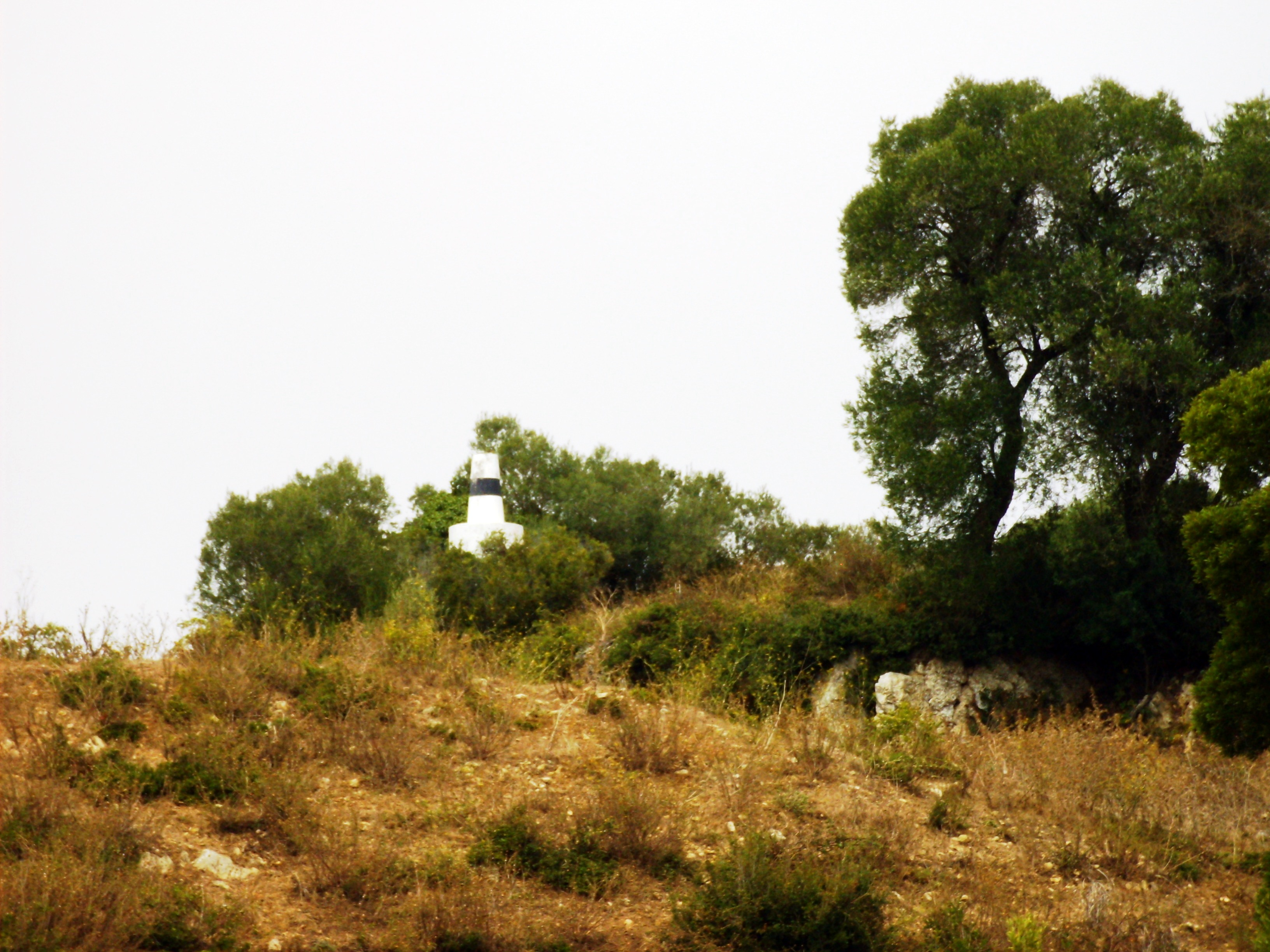
- The builtup mound and dense vegetation that remains of the Castle of Alfeizarão

Site information
- Type: Castle
- Owner: Portuguese Republic
- Open to the public: Private

Location
- Coordinates: 39°30′1.33″N 9°6′35.04″W

Site history
- Built: 12th century

The Castle of Alfeizerão (Portuguese: Castelo de Alfeizerão) is a Portuguese medieval castle in civil parish of Alfeizerão, municipality of Alcobaça, and in the Oeste region of the historical Estremadura province.

== History ==
What remains of the castle of Alfeizerão is still undocumented with any rigor, or accompanied by archaeological references. The strategic relevance of the locality to the birth of the Kingdom of Portugal, its expansion to the south in the middle of the 12th century, certainly determined its importance. About 3 kilometres (1.9 mi) from São Martinho do Porto, and it is the principal defensive point between Peniche and Nazaré, sheltering a small port. Following the conquest of the Arab stronghold in the 12th century, the fortifications were reconstructed in 1147 by troops loyal to D. Afonso Henriques.

The castle was sited on a hilltop, over the coast and guarding an extensive region 45 kilometres (28 mi) above the sea. The castle defended the coast along with the Fort of São Miguel (along the promontory of Nazaré) and the Fortress of Peniche (from the peninsula of Peniche), between the silt sandbar of the port. There are scarce references to the life of the castle, in particular during the height of its operation, in the early Middle Ages, but its decline has been documented, along with the decline of the port. In the 16th century, it was a maritime entrepot with the capacity to shelter 80 ships, but the intervening centuries saw its slow erosion.

On 1 November 1755, the Lisbon earthquake destroyed the castle and little effort was made to reconstruct the military outpost, thereby beginning a slow period of degradation and abandon.

By 1951, the castle was part of the property of Júlio Ferraz from Caldas da Rainha.

A proposal to clean up the space, consolidate the ruins and begin archaeological investigation on the site was communicated in 1973. In partnership with the local Junta Nacional de Educação (National Junta for Education), on 21 June 1974, there was a proposal to classify the walls of the abandoned castle as an Imóvel de Interesse Público (Property of Public Interest).

On 19 January 2007, a proposal was made by the DRCLVTejo to establish the fort within a Special Protection Zone that included the ruins of the castle and pillory of Alfeizerão, that was accepted by the IPA (on 26 June 2007) and Consultory Council of IGESPAR (on 31 October 2007). A new proposal was made on 8 February 2012, by DRCLVTejo include the walls within the Special Protection Zone, that was also accepted by the Conselho Nacional de Cultura (National Council on Culture), on 29 February. On 19 November, of the same year, a decision relative to the classification of the building within a status of Sítio de Interesse Público (Public Interest Site) was published in Announcement 13711/2012 (Diário da República), Série 2, 223).

== Architecture ==
The remains of the castle are located in a rural landscape, at about 45 metres (148 ft) above sea level, with view of São Martinho do Porto, some 3 kilometres (1.9 mi) away. It is encircled by the town of Alfeizerão to the east and west, and by a fertile plain in the remainder. The vestiges of this castle are covered in dense vegetation.

Although slowly eroded, there are still segments of the wall, composed of Opus isodomum, that connected the semi-circular corbels/towers. The courtyard was likely rectangular, defended by eight towers and an isolated keep tower, slightly off-centre from the eastern edge (oriented towards land). In one of these corbels is a geodesic marker.
