= Ernesto Korrodi =

Portuguese architect

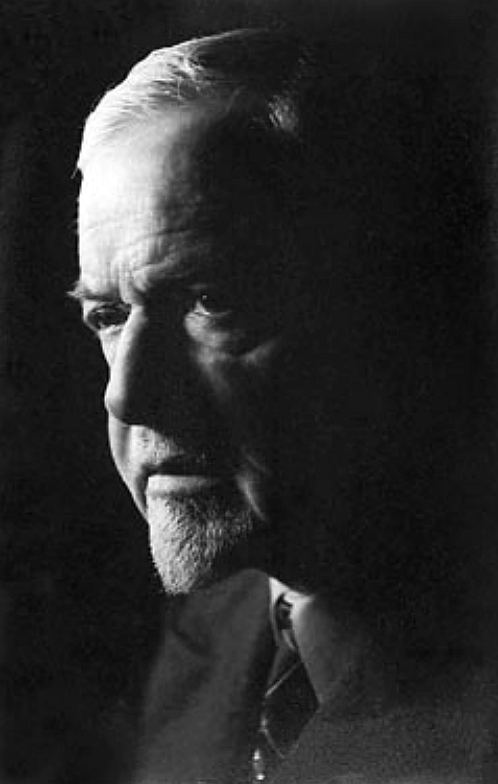
- Portrait of Korrodi
- Born: Ernst Korrodi; 31 January 1870; Zurich, Switzerland
- Died: 3 February 1944 (aged 74); Leiria, Portugal
- Citizenship: Portugal
- Occupation: Architect
- Known for: Pioneering Art Nouveau architecture in Portugal

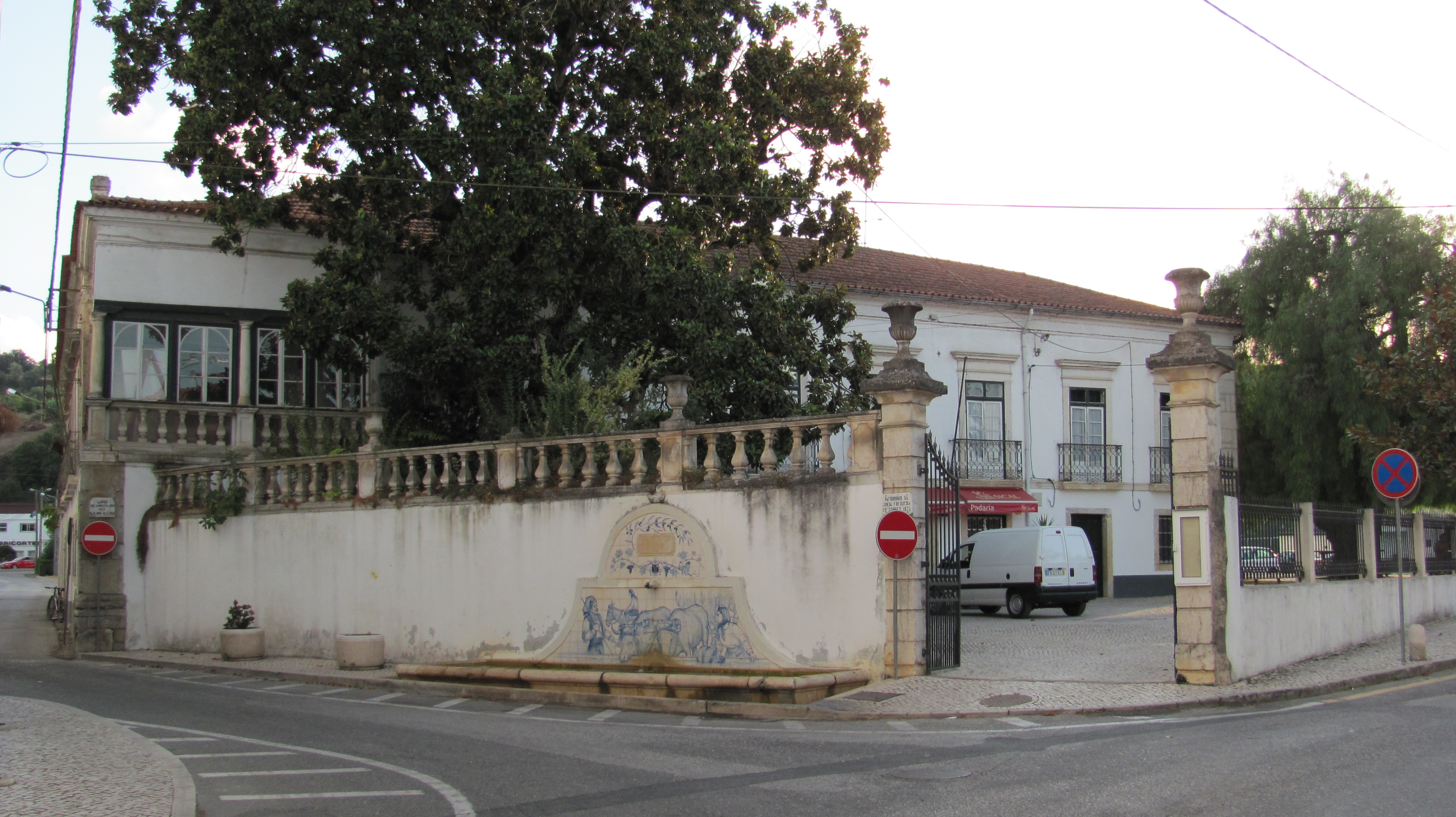
The Quinta da Cerca, Leiria, designed by Ernesto Korrodi

Ernesto Korrodi (Zürich, 31 January 1870 – Leiria, 3 February 1944), was a Swiss-born architect who moved to Portugal aged 19, spending the remainder of his life there.

He later adopted Portuguese citizenship, and married a Portuguese woman. He died in 1944.

== Main works ==
He has more than 400 works in all Portugal of which the most important are:

- Castle of D. Chica
- Hotel Guadiana in the town of Vila Real de Santo António, the oldest Hotel in the Algarve.
- Restoration of Leiria Castle
- Church of Santa Catarina da Serra, Leiria (1902)
