= Tomar Castle =

Castle in Tomar, Santarém, Portugal

Coordinates: 39°36′15″N 8°25′22″W

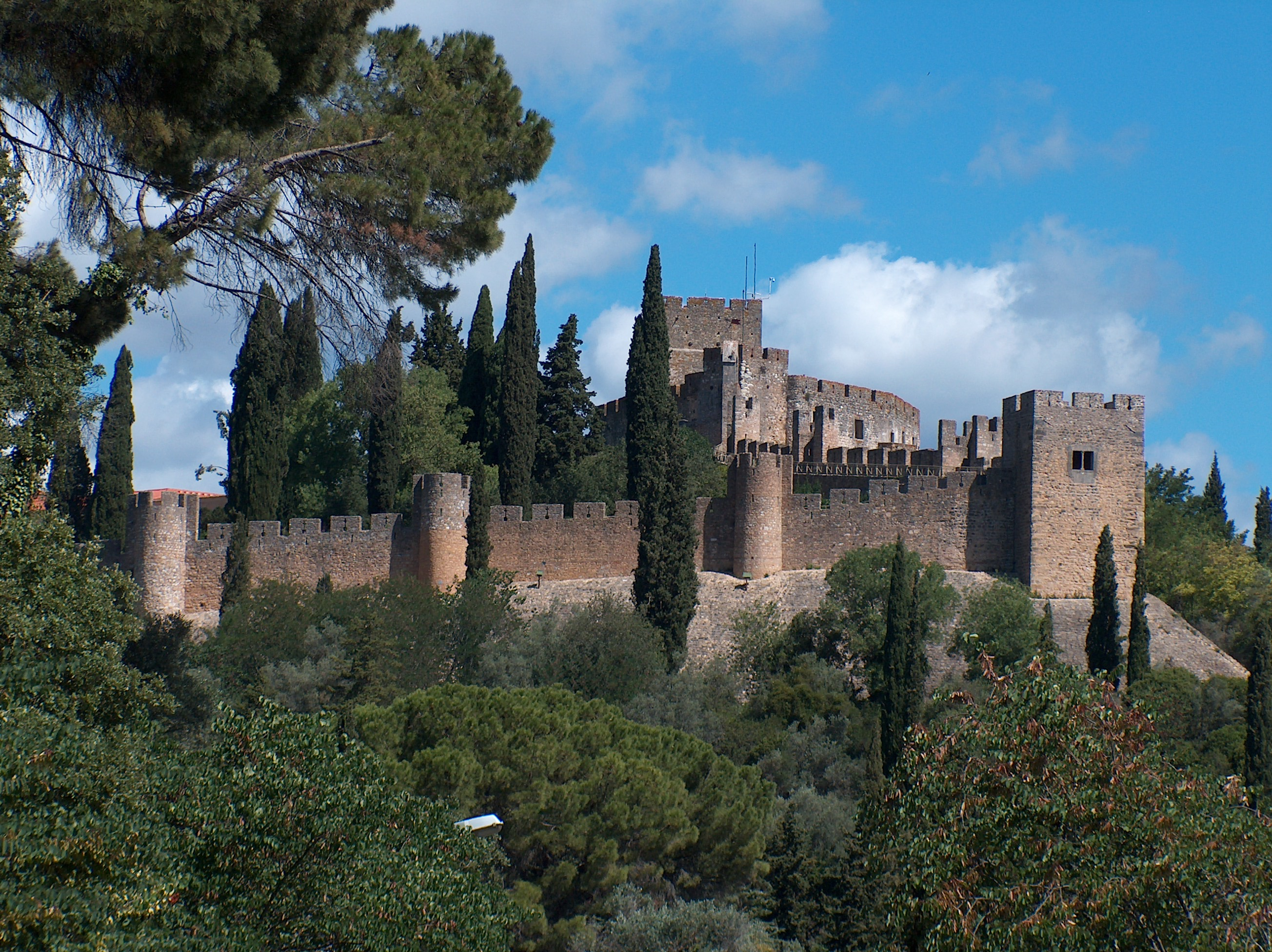
Tomar Castle in 2005

Tomar Castle is a national monument in the Santarém District of Portugal. Built on a hill above the town of Tomar and the river Nabão on land donated by King Afonso Henriques it was the Portuguese headquarters of the Knights Templar and the residence of their Grand Prior or Preceptor. It subsequently belonged to their successors in Portugal, the Order of Christ, and later became part of the Convento de Cristo, a catholic convent and UNESCO World Heritage Site.

== Architecture ==
Built around 1160 as a Templar stronghold, it has an outer defensive wall and a citadel (alcáçova) with a keep inside. The keep, a central tower with residential and defensive functions, was introduced into Portugal by the Templars, and the example in Tomar is one of the oldest in the country. Another innovation introduced into Portugal by the Templars (learned from decades of experience in Normandy and Brittany and elsewhere) is the round towers in the castle's outer walls, which are more resistant to attacks than square towers. When the town was founded, most of its residents lived in dwellings located inside the protective outer walls of the castle. The round church in the castle was, like many Templar churches, modelled on the rotunda of the Church of the Holy Sepulchre in Jerusalem. When Prince Henry the Navigator became the Grand Master of the Order of Christ he enlarged this church with a nave built in the Gothic style and constructed a palace for himself within the castle walls.

== History ==
King Afonso Henriques became a member of the Templars in 1128. Thirty years later he donated lands to them and the Templar Master Dom Gualdim Pais ordered the construction of Tomar Castle and its church.

Tomar was besieged for five days during the Almohad campaign of 1190.

A Cistercian monastery was built next to the castle on the orders of King Denis of Portugal in 1319. The Order of Christ moved their headquarters to the castle in 1357, making a number of architectural extensions and adaptations. Further construction work for the community of monastic knights was carried out in the sixteenth century under King John III of Portugal. The site was damaged by the 1755 Lisbon earthquake and by Napoleon's Grande Armée during the Peninsular War. Following the dissolution of the monasteries in Portugal in 1834, some parts of the convent were used as a military hospital.

== See also ==
- Portugal in the Middle Ages
  - Portugal in the Reconquista
- Knights Templar in Portugal
