= Igreja de São João Baptista (Tomar) =

Church in Tomar, Santarém District, Portugal

Coordinates: 39.603109°N 8.411708°W

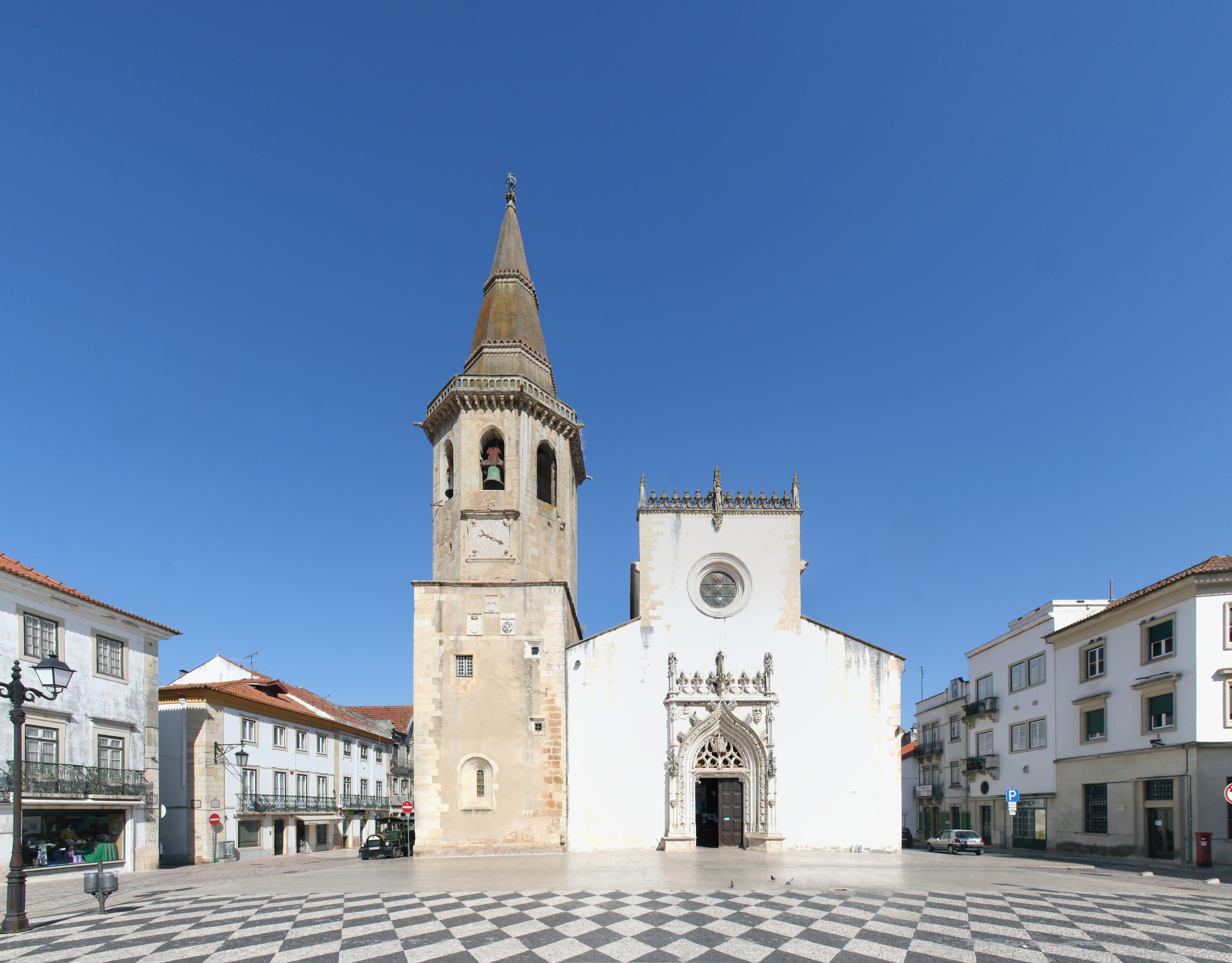
Igreja de São João Baptista

The Church of Saint John the Baptist (Portuguese: Igreja de São João Baptista) is a 15th-century Catholic church in Tomar, Portugal that was built by King Manuel I and is of Manueline architecture. As its name implies, the church is dedicated to Saint John the Baptist. It has been classified as a National Monument since 1910.

== About ==
The main church of Tomar is located in the main square of the town, in front of the Municipality (17th century) and a modern statue of Gualdim Pais. The church was built between the 15th and 16th centuries and has many interesting artistic details, like the flamboyant Gothic portal, the Manueline tower with a 16th-century clock, the decorated capitals of the inner columns of the nave and several panels painted in the 1530s by one of Portugal's best Renaissance artists, Gregório Lopes.

== Gallery ==
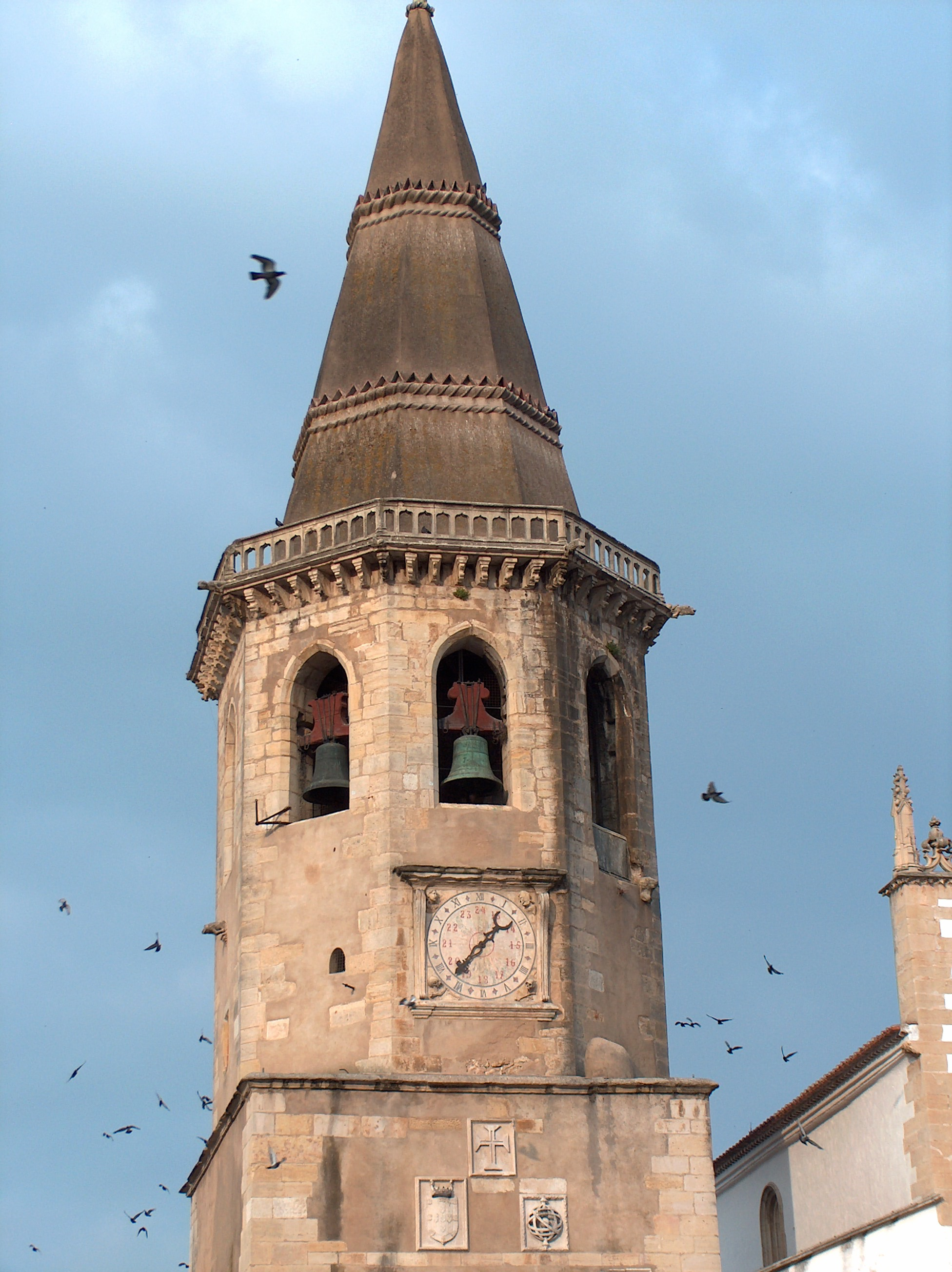

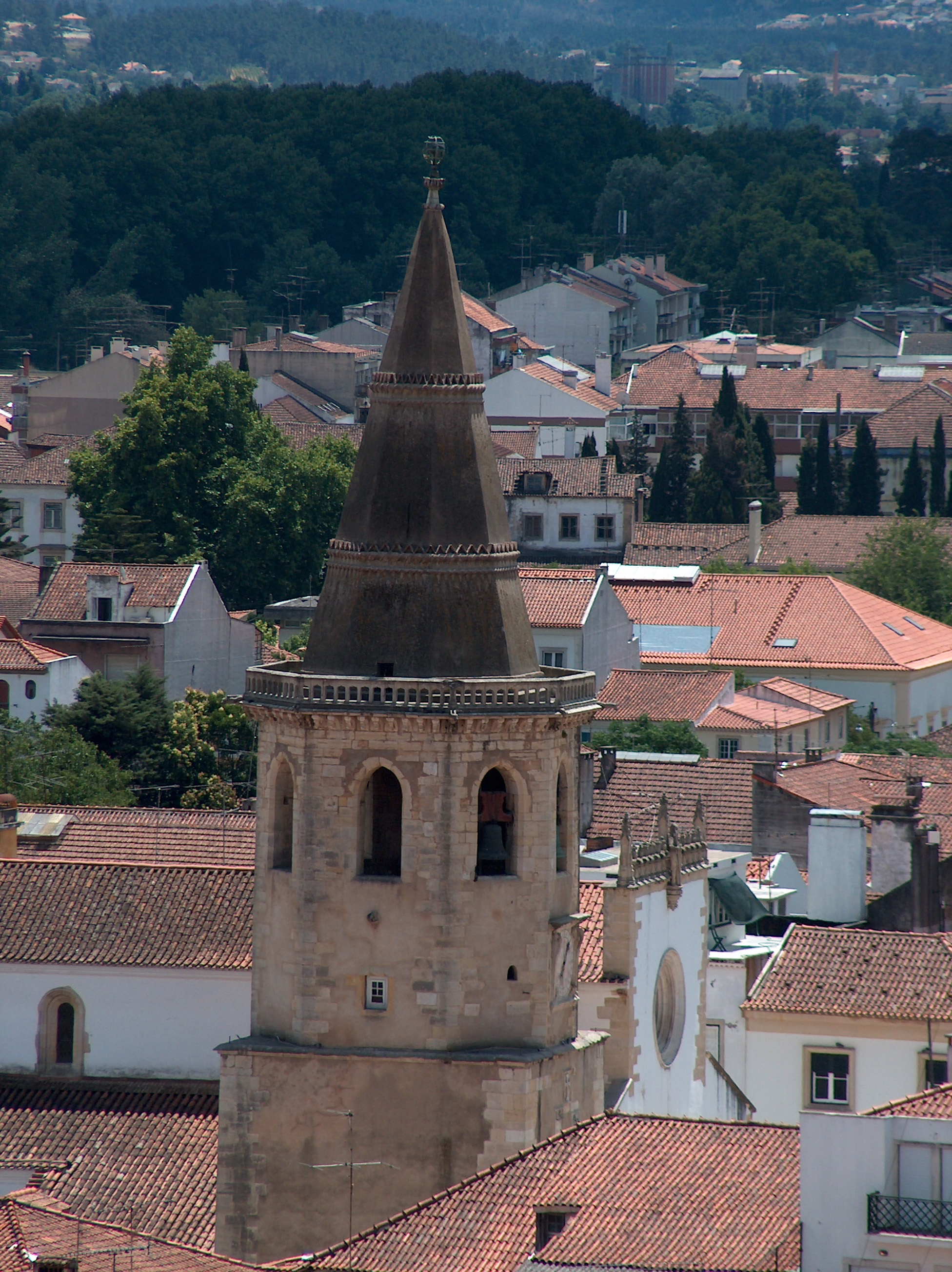

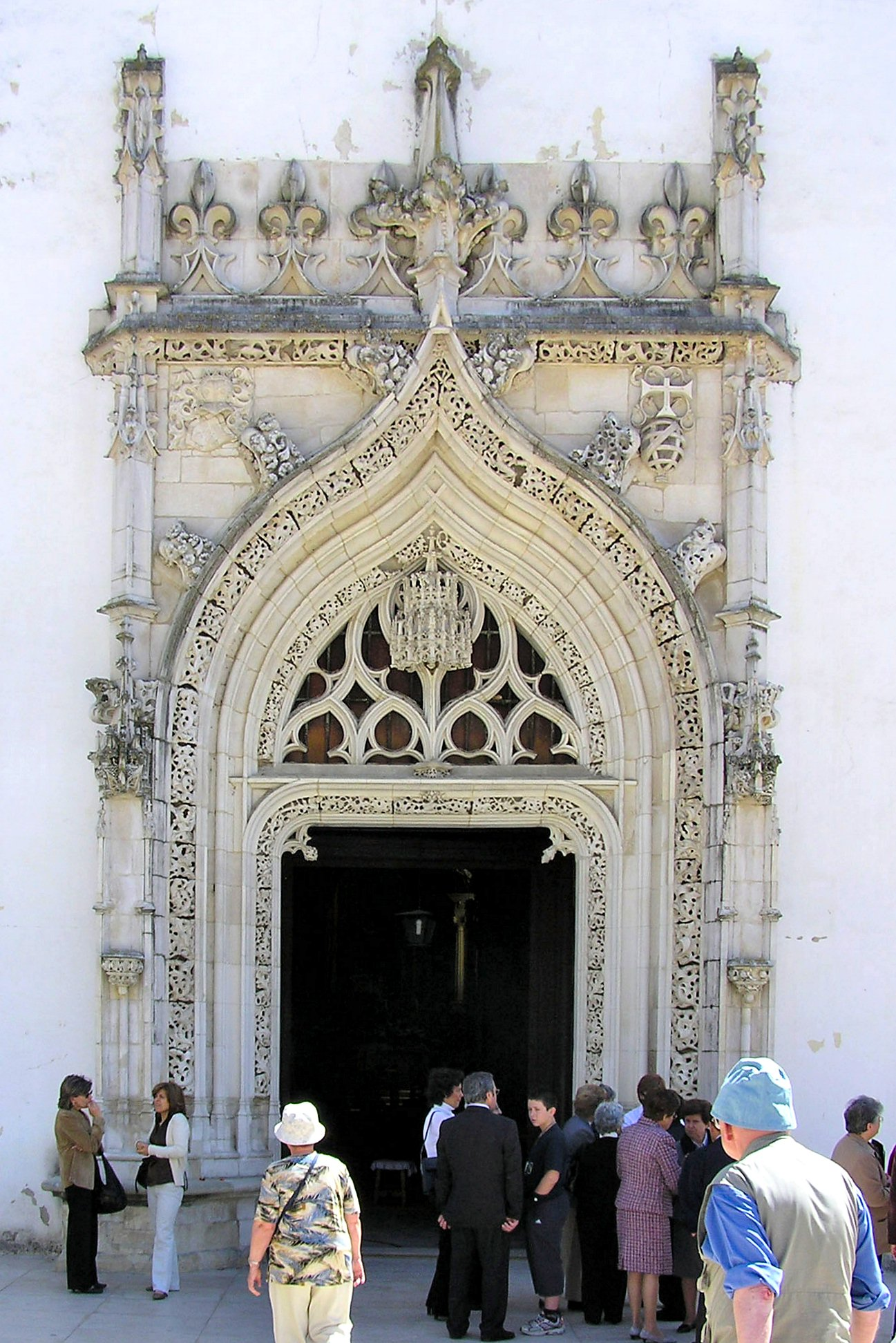
