= Madalena (Tomar) =

Coordinates: 39.587°N 8.448°W

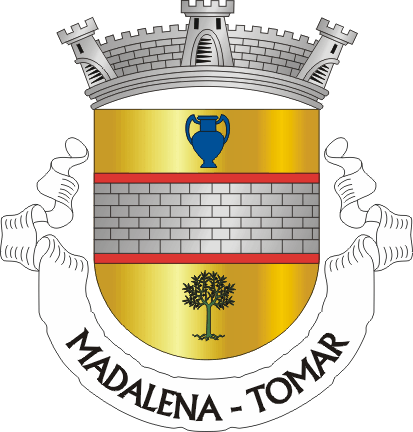
Coat of Arms

Madalena is a former civil parish in the municipality of Tomar, Portugal. In 2013, the parish merged into the new parish Madalena e Beselga. It has a total area of 30.56 km^{2} and a population of 3,466 inhabitants (2001). Its population density is 113.4 people per km^{2}.

The parish includes the following villages: Caldelas, Caniçal, Carvalhal Grande, Carvalhal Pequeno, Cem Soldos, Charneca do Maxial, Madalena, Maxial, Paço da Comenda, Porto da Lage, Porto Mendo and São Miguel.

According to Pinho Leal in "Portugal Antigo e Moderno" (Portugal Past and Present), the parish was heavily populated in the Roman era. For this author the modern Caldelas is built upon the site of the ancient city of the same name. Other writers say that Caldele was the exact name of the Roman city.
