= Hermitage of Nossa Senhora da Conceição (Tomar) =

- Ermida of Nossa Senhora da Conceição
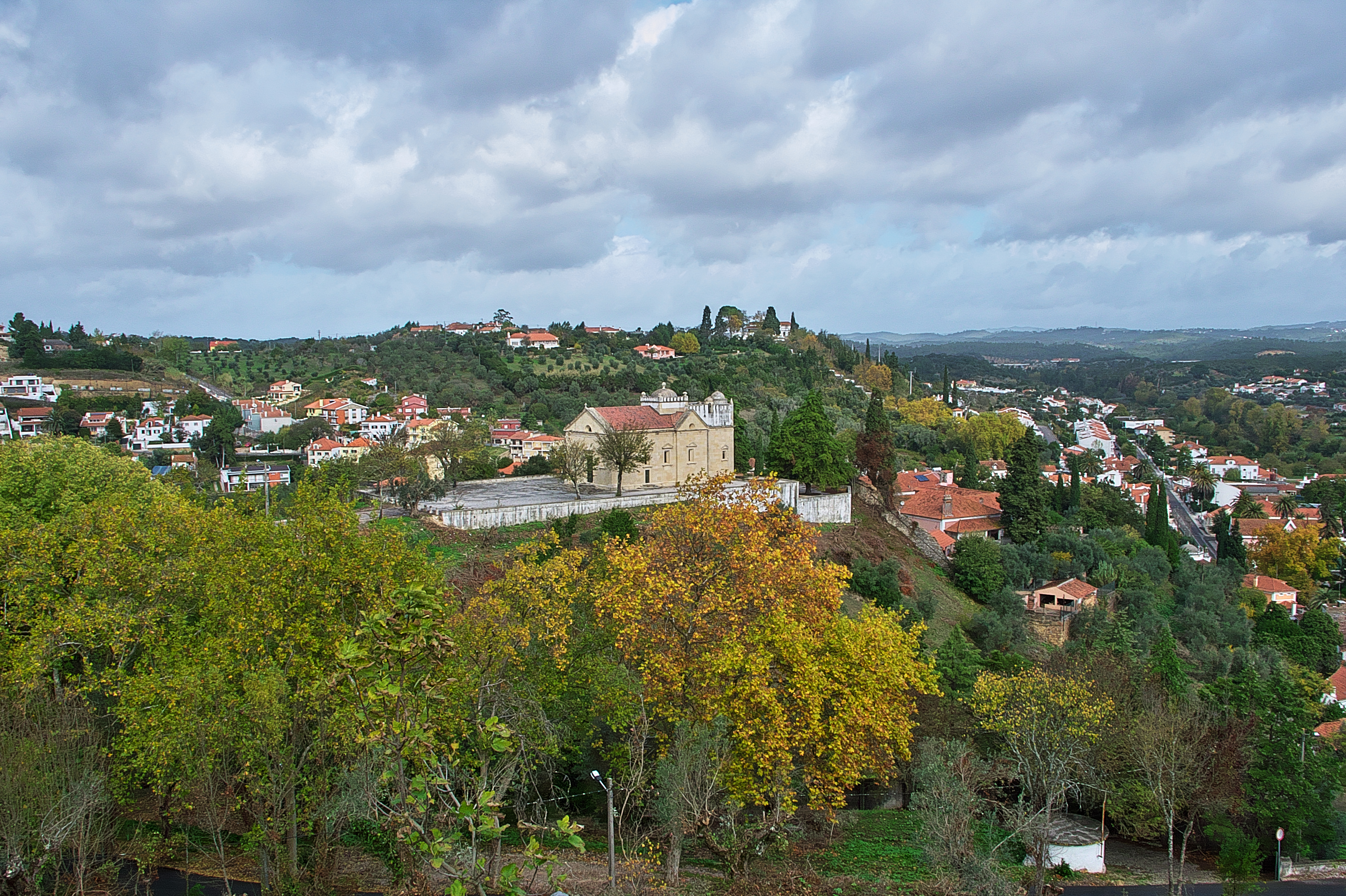
- The hermitage overlooking the community of Tomar, destined to be the funerary pantheon of King John III of Portugal
- Interactive map of the Hermitage of Nossa Senhora da Conceição area

General information
- Type: Hermitage
- Architectural style: Mannerist
- Location: São João Baptista, Tomar, Portugal
- Coordinates: 39°36′21.01″N 8°25′0.62″W
- Opened: c. 1551
- Owner: Portuguese Republic

Technical details
- Material: Stonework

Design and construction
- Architect: João de Castilho

The Hermitage of Nossa Senhora da Conceição (Our Lady of Conception) is a 16th-century hermitage located in the civil parish of São João Baptista, in the municipality of Tomar, designated as a National Monument (Portuguese: Monumento Nacional) in 1910.

== History ==
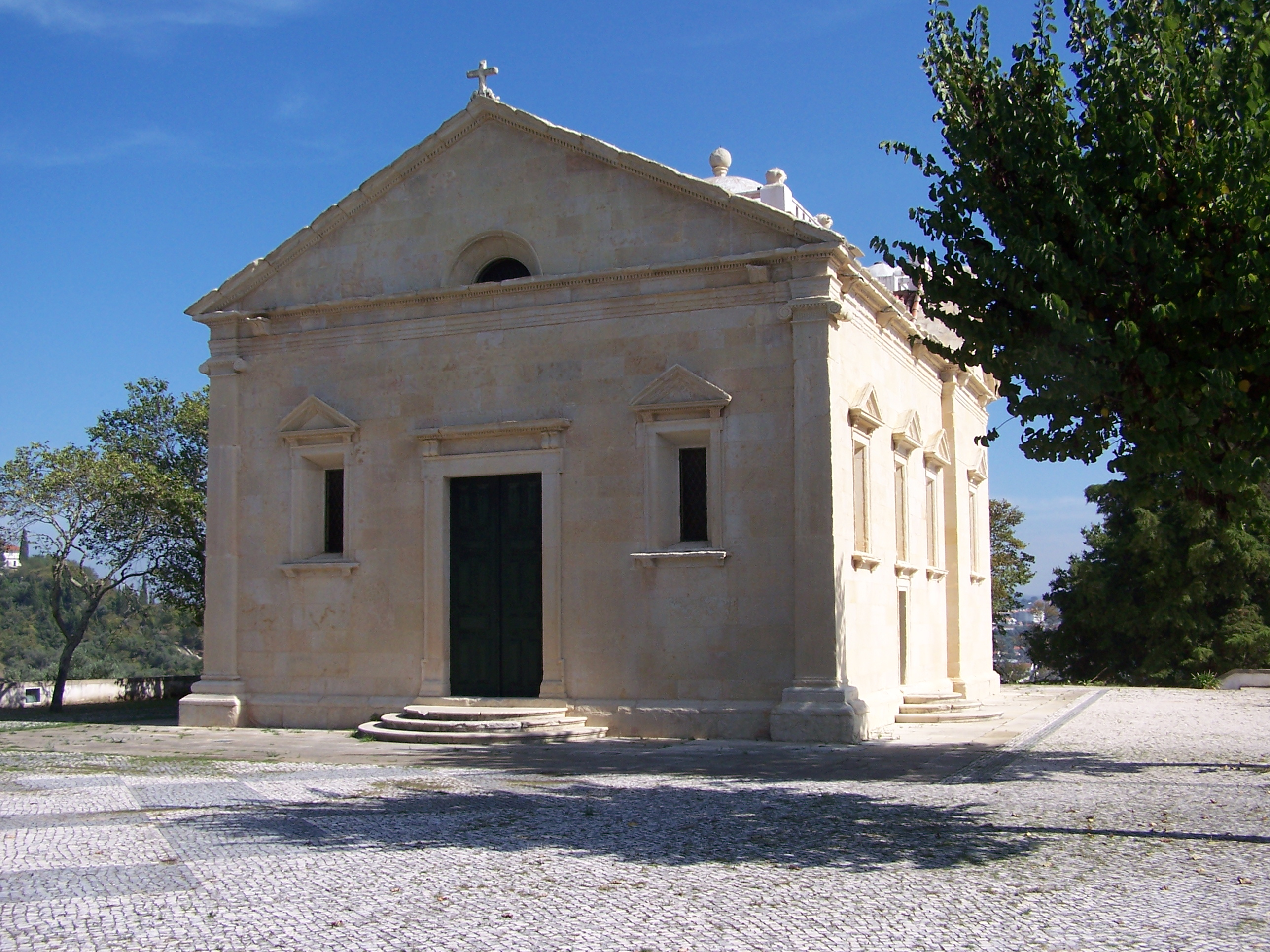
The austere frontal aspect of the hermitage, showing the paved stone courtyard

According to Conceição Pires Coelho the construction started in or after 1535, during the priorship of Anthony of Padua, and concluded during the administration of Friar Basílio (1573). The building was one of the last constructions completed by architect João de Castilho. Initiated in 1551, with construction beginning in 1535, the temple was concluded in 1572-1573, after the death of the architect, under the direction of Diogo de Torralva. Conceived as a funerary pantheon by King John III, the hermitage was innovative for the period. It was comparable to the temple of Rimini Malatestiano, designed by Leon Battista Alberti, with some motifs, including the use of windows and the "compressed interior design"

In 1711, friar Agostinho de Santa Maria referenced the temple in correspondence, referring to it as a Marian sanctuary.

A commemorative inscription was installed in 1848, following restorations completed in this church.

In 1933-1934, the General-Directorate for National Monuments and Buildings (Portuguese: Direcção Geral dos Edifícios e Monumentos Nacionais) was charged with the consolidation and reinforcement of the central vault; reconstruction of the slats, frame and roof with glazed tiles; installation of exterior wall guards; the opening of exterior cracks and reinforcing them with water-resistant cement; reinforcement of the dome with hidden iron struts; and the reconstruction of the lateral and central doors.

In 1946, a process was defined to designate the space as a zone of special protection (Portuguese: Zona Especial de Pretecção), which was published in the following year.

Between 1965 and 1966, the support walls, churchyard spaces and staircase were defined and expanded, which included the reinforcement of the northern, southern and western limits with cap-stone and erecting an eastern fence. The project also involved the cleaning and repair of the staircase access to the main chapel and removal of rubble from the doorway and cracks in the walls, doors, window frames and spaces. These improvements lead to the installation of exterior illumination in 1967 to attract tourism. Reconstruction of the support wall, the roofing, construction of interior doorways and painting of the exterior doors were completed at the beginning of 1970. Similar cleaning and lateral door replacement occurred by the end of 1979.

On 1 June 1992, the property was transferred into the authority of the Português do Património Arquitectónico (IPPAR) (forerunner of the Institute for the Management of Architectural and Archaeological Heritage), under decree 106F/92.

In a public tender, dated 13 February 2001, the IGESPAR published a request for competitive bids to (Diário da República III Série, nº 37, public competition nº 306/IPPAR-L/E/2000) complete restoration and conservation projects in theConvento de Cristo, Ermida da Imaculada Conceição. These public works began in 2002, which included the study of exterior walls; full restoration and masonry repair; the cleaning and restoration of stone in interior and exterior; the repair and replacement of joints; the establishment of an electrostatic system to deter pigeons from landing; replacement and restoration of plaster; the consolidation of the decorative elements inside and outside; installation of interior lighting and signage; improvement of peripheral drainage systems; and the full restoration of the statue of Nossa Senhora da Conceição.

== Architecture ==
The chapel is on an elevated part of the city of Tomar, on a platform delimited by a low wall, below the Castle of Tomar and Convent of Christ. It reflects the influence of classical Italian architecture in Portugal, with a stylistic interior aesthetic that is presupposes its use as a funerary chapel. While most of the churchyard is open with tiled pavement and landscaping, the rear of the hermitage includes a terraced garden, accessed by double symmetrical staircases.

The longitudinal plan consists of three naves, with a slight transept, and a narrow prismatic chancel. While most of the hermitages roof is covered in tiles, the transept is finished with a central tower and domed cupola with corner pinnacles, and the chancel encircled by square roof. On the parapet that crowns the chancel is a small bell-tower arch, accessible by a domed staircase opening over the chancel. The exterior walls are generally smooth, but broken by ornamented Italianate windows and doorways with simple friezes and cornices. The main façade includes a rectangular door surmounted by an entablature, on the front of a triangular pediment with frieze and semi-circular window. A Latin cross surmounts this frontal entrance. The façades of the transept, also with triangular pediments on the northern and southern directions, are oriented north to south, with the southern façade having a rectangular door under one of the nave windows. All the windows on the exterior are decorated with cornices, friezes and triangular pediments.

=== Interior ===
The interior three naves are separated by two rows of three Corinthian columns, surmounted by square capitals that support a semi-circular vaulted ceiling broken by the cupola. Decorated square capitals divide each section of the cross, and support the cupola, its corners decorated with rosettes. The semi-cylindrical chancel, with apse niche supporting an image of the patron saint, is preceded by a stretched dome which opens into two small lateral chapels. The chancel chapels were constructed to house the tombs of King John III and Queen Catherine. The floor includes several stones with inscriptions that were removed from the Chapel of Santa Catarina within the Castle of Tomar.

The transept is covered by a vaulted ceiling decorated with geometric and floral motifs, with corners embellished with grotesque masks, as noted by Rafael Moreira: "demons personified from the rivers of Hades, crying, with the two towards the nave with an air of indignation and scare, with the two alongside the triumphal arch exemplifies sorrow and horror of the subterranean world..."' The decorated capitals in the transept and chancel are funerary symbols, with the skulls symbolizing death and the phoenix symbolizing resurrection: this humanist iconography forms a logical expression of triumph over death and glorification of the institution of the Crown.

The internal decoration demonstrates an understanding of classical themes, and expresses João de Castilho's theoretical conception: inspired by Diego de Sagredo's "Medidas del Romano", which was published in the mid-16th century (1541) in Portugal. Further, the structure of the temple offers an understanding of royal architecture, including Roman influences and concepts that divided space between the "city of man" (the village of Tomar) and the "city of God" (represented by the nearby Convent of Christ).

== Notes ==
Notes

Sources

- Kubler, George; Soria, M. (1959), Art and Architecture in Spain and Portugal (1500 to 1800) (in Portuguese), London, England: Harmondswarth
- Moreira, Rafael (1981), "Ermida de Nª Sª da Conceição, mausoléu de D. João III", in Câmara Municipal (ed.), Boletim Cultural e Informativo da CMT (in Portuguese), Tomar, Portugal: Câmara Municipal de Tomar
- Coelho, Maria da Conceição Pires (1987), A Igreja da Conceição e o Claustro de D. João III do Convento de Cristo em Tomar (in Portuguese), Santarém, Portugal
- Borges, Inês da Conceição do Carmo (2006), "A Igreja de Nossa Senhora da Conceição em Tomar (Texto policopiado)", Seminário: "Arquitectura e Renascimento" (in Portuguese), Coimbra, Portugal
- Ramos, Celso Paraíso (2013), A Capela da Nossa Senhora da Conceição em Tomar (in Portuguese), Porto: FAUP (Master's thesis)
