= PNSC =

PNSC may refer to:

- Pakistan National Shipping Corporation
- Supreme Court of the Pitcairn Islands
- Portsmouth Northsea Swimming Club
- Paróquia Nossa Senhora da Conceição
