= Nabão =

See also: Nabao (disambiguation)

Nabão may refer to:

- Nabão River
- 3 Léguas do Nabão (List of half marathon races)
