= Ana Laíns =

Portuguese fado singer (born 1979)

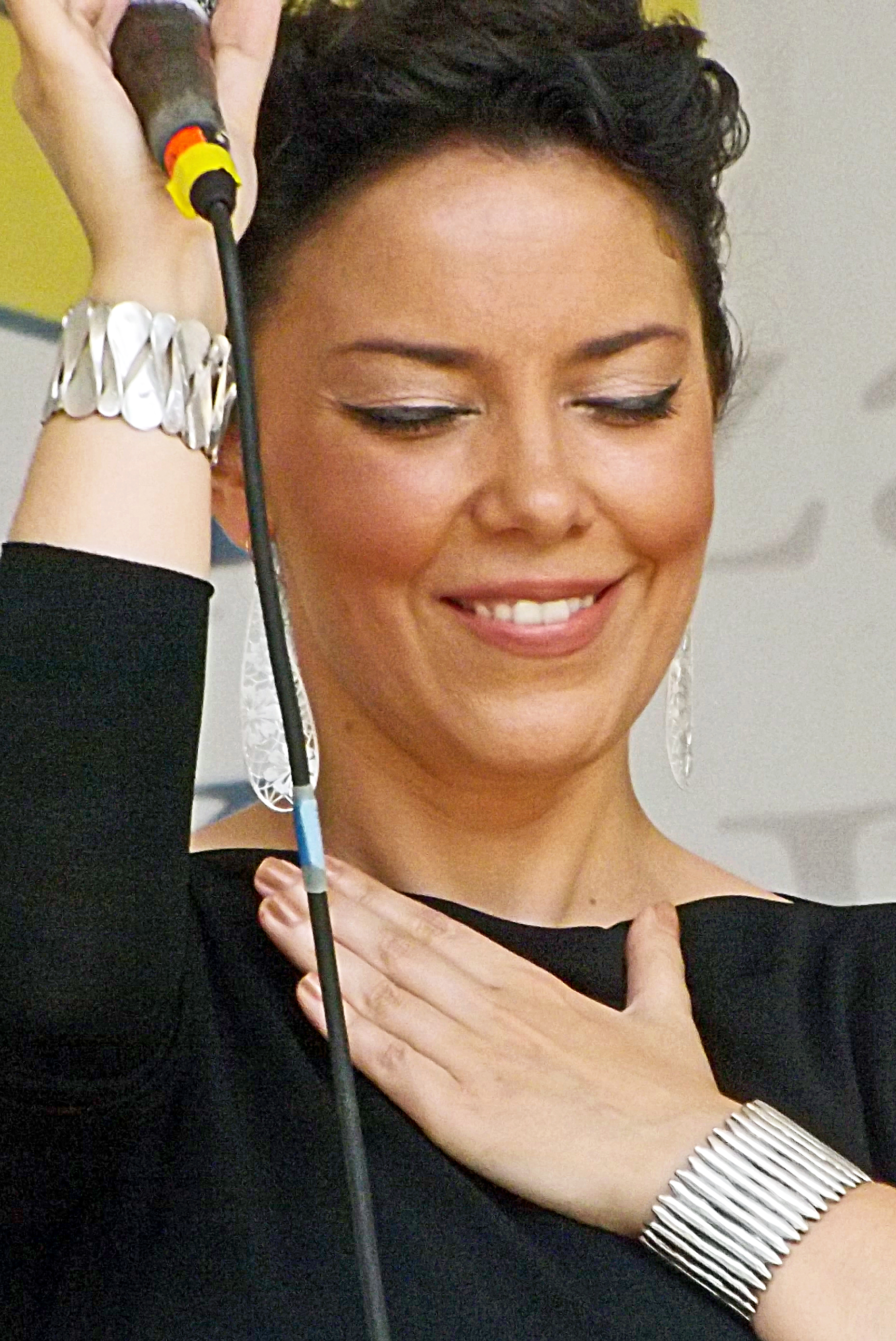
- Born: August 16, 1979 (age 46); Tomar, Portugal
- Website: analainsmusic.com

Ana Margarida Laíns da Silva Augusto (born 16 August 1979, in Tomar) is a Portuguese fado singer.

== Discography ==
- 2006 – Sentidos (Difference)
- 2010 – Quatro Caminhos (Difference)
- 2017 – Portucalis
