= Nabao =

See also Nabão (disambiguation)

Nabao may refer to:

- Nabao region (Futuna Island, Vanuatu)
- Nabao (barangay) (Cabanatuan)
