= Festa dos Tabuleiros =

Portuguese religious festival

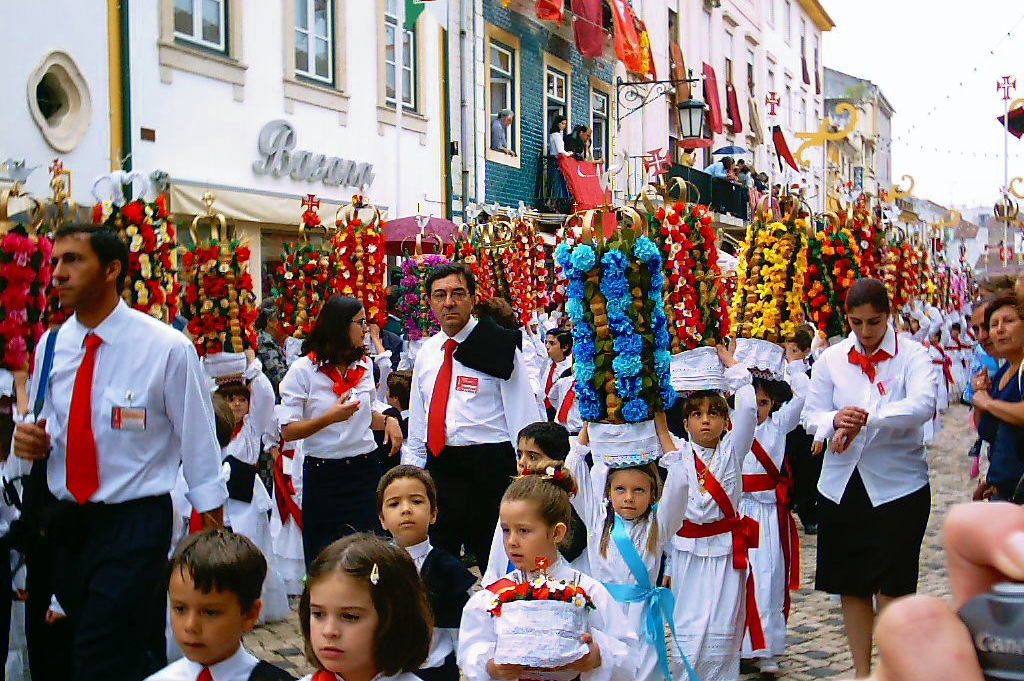

The Festa dos Tabuleiros (Festival of the Trays) or Festa do Divino Espírito Santo (Feast of the Holy Spirit), takes place every four years in July in Tomar, Portugal. This festival is an ancient tradition and the most important celebrated in the city, attracting people from all over the world. It is held every four years, the last one being held between July 2 to July 10, 2023. The local population parades in pairs with the girls carrying tabuleiros on their heads. The tabuleiro is made of 30 stacked pieces of bread, either in 6 rows of 5 or 5 rows of 6, decorated with flowers. At the top of the tabuleiro is a crown which normally contains either a white dove, symbolising the Holy Spirit, or the esfera armilar (armillary sphere), a symbol of the historical Portuguese maritime expansion, and over the sphere, the cross of the Order of Christ.

The festival also includes various traditional ceremonies like the "Procession of the Crowns", the "Procession of the Boys", the "Procession of the Mordomo" and the "Arrival of the Bulls of the Holy Spirit", as well as partial parades and popular games. The Pêza, or sharing of bread and meat by the population, is celebrated on the day after the processions.

Although the festival originated in ancient Portuguese millenarian rituals dating to the 13th century, specifically the Culto do Império do Divino Espírito Santo (Cult of the Empire of the Holy Spirit) celebrated on the feast day of the Pentecost, and has gradually evolved since then, the form of the festival as currently celebrated was standardized in 1950. In this context, "cult" refers to accepted religious practice, rather than the modern negative connotations of the word.

In some localities around the town of Tomar, as at Carregueiros, the complete ceremony of the ancient cult of the Empire of the Holy Spirit is still practiced, including the "Coronation of the Emperor", symbolizing the future Emperor of the Age of the Holy Spirit, and the Bodo (Feast).

According to the traditional doctrines of the cult, in this Third Age the world would be governed by the Empire of Holy Spirit under monastic or fraternal rule, in which the hierarchy of the Catholic Church, its intermediaries in the clergy, and organized churches would be unnecessary, and "infidels" would unite with Christians by their own free will. The Tabuleiros were identified as an offering by each family for the symbolic building of the Temple of Jerusalem, that is, as the supporting columns of the Temple of the Heavenly Jerusalem and of the Temple of Solomon.
