= Madalena e Beselga =

- Civil parish
- Location in Portugal
- Coordinates: 39.587°N 8.448°W
- Country: Portugal
- Region: Oeste e Vale do Tejo
- Intermunic. comm.: Médio Tejo
- District: Santarém
- Municipality: Tomar

Area
  - Total: 44.44 km^{2} (17.16 sq mi)

Population (2011)
  - Total: 3,990
  - Density: 90/km^{2} (230/sq mi)
- Time zone: UTC+00:00 (WET)
  - Summer (DST): UTC+01:00 (WEST)

Madalena e Beselga is a civil parish in the municipality of Tomar, Portugal. It was formed in 2013 by the merger of the former parishes Madalena and Beselga. The population in 2011 was 3,990, in an area of 44.44 km².
