= Nossa Senhora da Conceição =

Nossa Senhora da Conceição (Portuguese, 'Our Lady of (Immaculate) Conception') may refer to:

== Places and churches ==
=== Angola ===
- Church of Nossa Senhora da Conceição da Muxima, a church in Muxima District, Bengo Province
- Igreja de Nossa Senhora da Conceição (Luanda), a church in Luanda

=== Brazil ===
- Our Lady of the Conception Cathedral, Aracaju (Nossa Senhora da Conceiçao (Aracaju)), the cathedral see of the Roman Catholic Archdiocese of Aracaju, Sergipe
- Metropolitan Cathedral of Our Lady of the Conception, Manaus (Nossa Senhora da Conceição (Manaus), a Catholic cathedral in the city of Manaus, Amazonas
- Basílica Nossa Senhora da Conceição da Praia, a church in Salvador, Bahia

=== Cape Verde ===
- Nossa Senhora da Conceição church (Boa Vista), a church in the Povoação Velha village
- Nossa Senhora da Conceição (São Filipe), a parish in the municipality of São Filipe

=== India ===
- Our Lady of the Immaculate Conception Church, Goa (Igreja de Nossa Senhora da Imaculada Conceição), in Panaji, Goa

=== Portugal ===
- Alandroal (Nossa Senhora da Conceição), a parish in Alandroal
- Nossa Senhora da Conceição, a parish in Vila Real
- Nossa Senhora da Conceição (Vila Viçosa), a former parish in Vila Viçosa, now part of the union of parishes of Nossa Senhora da Conceição e São Bartolomeu
- Church of Nossa Senhora da Conceição Velha, Lisbon
- Hermitage of Nossa Senhora da Conceição (Tomar), church near Tomar, Santarém District
- Igreja de Nossa Senhora da Conceição (Ermida do Paiva), Castro Daire, Viseu District
- Igreja de Nossa Senhora da Conceição, in Mafra, Portugal
- Igreja de Nossa Senhora da Conceição (Santa Maria da Feira), Santa Maria da Feira, Aveiro District
- Igreja de Nossa Senhora da Conceição do Colégio dos Jesuítas, church in Santarém
- Royal Military Order of Our Lady of the Concepcion of Vila Viçosa, a portuguese honorific order

=== São Tomé and Principe ===
- Our Lady of Conception Church, São Tomé: Igreja de Nossa Senhora da Conceição, Agua Grande

==== Azores ====
- Nossa Senhora da Conceição (Angra do Heroísmo)
- Church of Nossa Senhora da Conceição (Santa Cruz das Flores), in Flores Island

== Other uses ==
- Nossa Senhora da Conceição (1771 ship)
- Nossa Senhora da Conceição Fortress, a Portuguese fortress in Póvoa de Varzim
