= Church of Santa Maria do Olival =

Roman Catholic church in Tomar, Portugal

Coordinates: 39.6015°N 8.4073°W

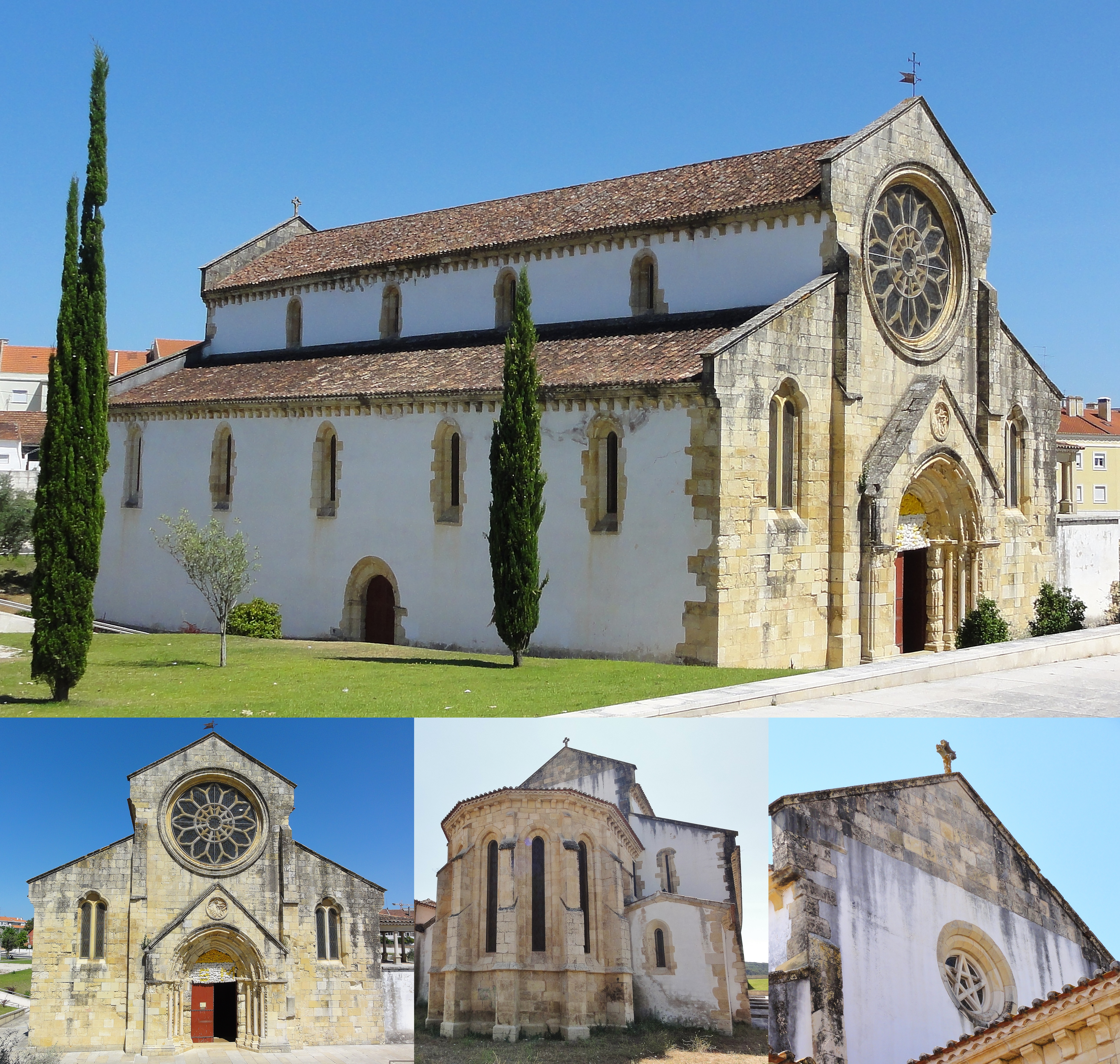
The Church of Santa Maria do Olival at Tomar

The Church of Santa Maria do Olival (English: Saint Mary of the Olive Grove) is a Roman Catholic church in the city of Tomar, in Portugal. The Church has been characterized as a National Monument since 1910.

== History ==
The church was built in the second half of the 12th century by the provincial master of the Order of the Knights Templar in Portugal, Gualdim Pais. It was used as a burial place for the Knights Templar of Tomar and, later, by the Knights of the Order of Christ, which succeeded the Templars in the 14th century. Gualdim Pais is buried in the church, and his original tomb slab, dated from 1195 and bearing a gothic inscription, is still preserved inside.

== Overview ==
The current building is mostly the result of a reconstruction carried out in the 13th century in early Gothic style. The main façade has a beautiful rose window and a simple portal with several archivolts, and is flanked by a free-standing bell tower. The interior is very simple. The church has three naves covered by a wooden roof, and the columns of the pointed arches of the naves are devoid of capitals. The main chapel of the apse is covered by a Gothic ribbed vault. The tracery of the small rose window in the Eastern wall of the nave has the shape of a pentagram.

In the 16th century the church was restored, and several chapels were added to the southern side of the church. Notable are the polychromed statue of the Virgin Mary and Child (early 16th century) in the main altar and the funerary monument of Diogo Pinheiro, first Bishop of Funchal, a fine Renaissance work dated from 1525, located on the wall of the main chapel.

On the left side nave, in front of the chapel displaying the statue "Virgin Mary" there is a slab carved with the arms of two (2) families whose faded Latin inscription reads, immediately under the arms, "T.DA.CUNHA" appearing to indicate that one of the persons buried under it was a relation of the famous commander Tristão da Cunha.

== See also ==
- Knights Templar
  - Knights Templar in Portugal
- Tomar
- Convent of the Order of Christ
