= Irene of Tomar =

Portuguese Christian martyr

Saint Irene of Tomar
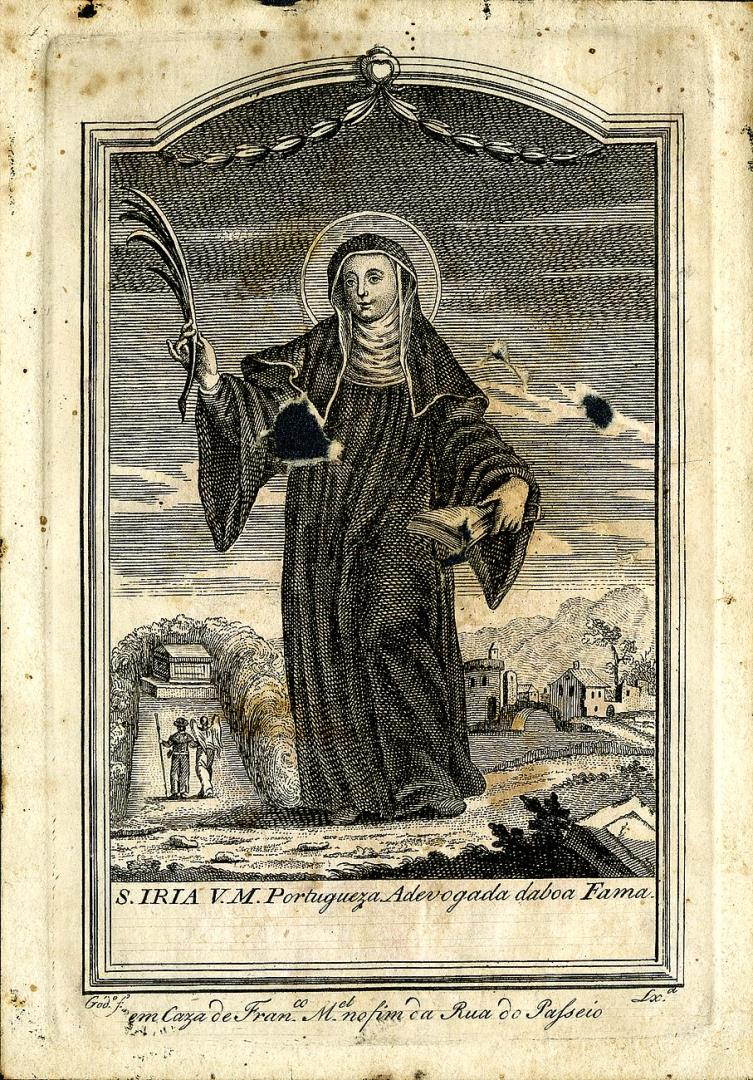

Virgin and martyr
- Born: c. 635; Tomar, Portugal
- Died: c. 653; Scalabis (Santarém), Portugal
- Venerated in: Roman Catholic Church; Eastern Orthodox Church
- Feast: 20 October
- Attributes: as a nun, with the palm of martyrdom
- Patronage: Tomar, Portugal; Santarém; Santa Iria de Azóia, Loures

Irene of Tomar (Portuguese: Santa Iria) (c.635 – c.653) was a Christian who was martyred for her faith in Visigothic Portugal. Her parents, wishing to protect her, sent her to a convent school and a private tutor. The only times she left her house was to attend Mass or pray at the sanctuary of Saint Peter. The legend of her life is possibly little more than that.

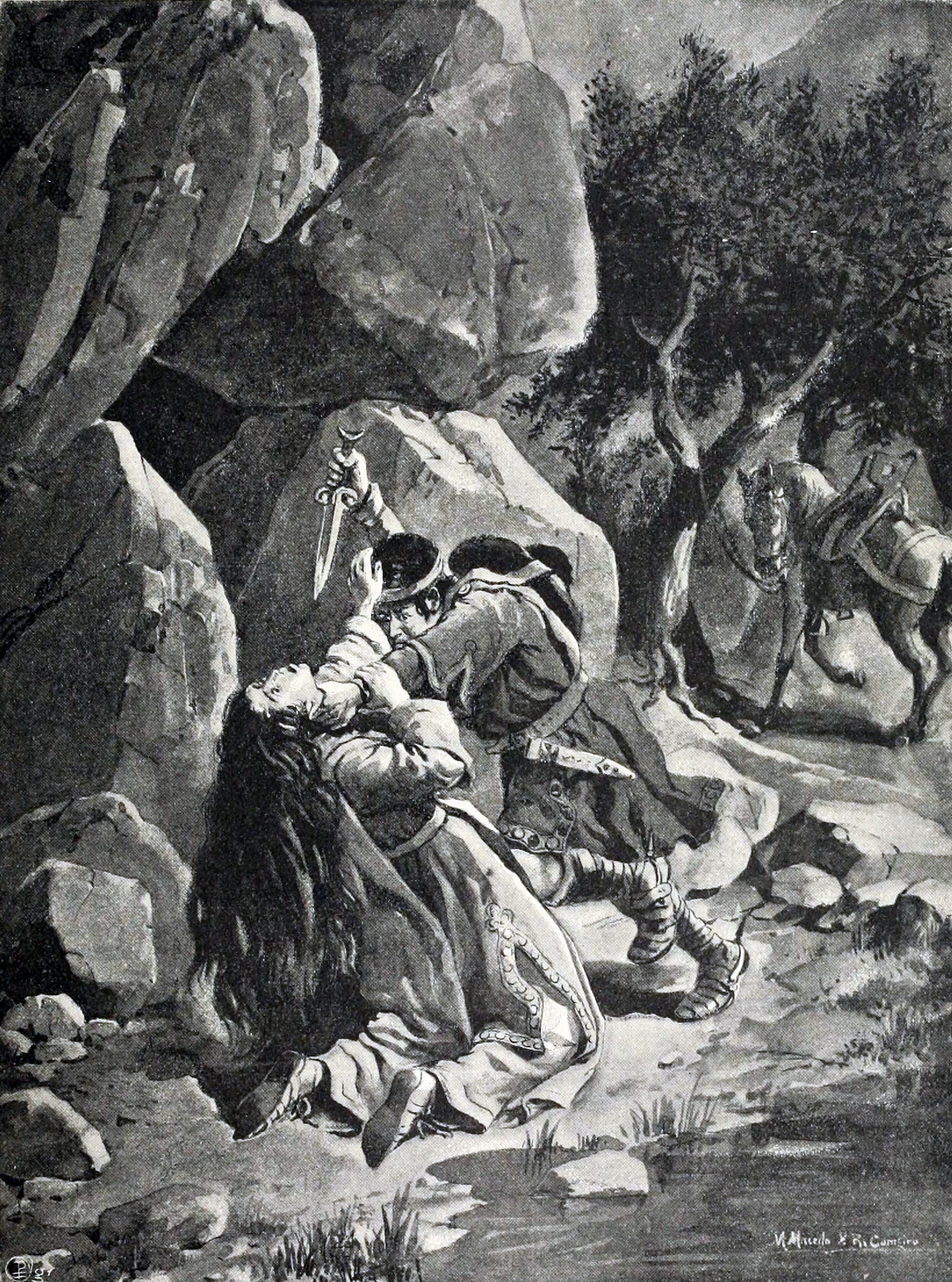
The murder of Irene, lithography by Manuel Macedo and Alfredo Roque Gameiro, 1904.

== Legend ==
Legend says that Irene was born in Nabância, present-day Tomar, Portugal. She was born into an influential family, and her parents, wishing to protect her, sent her to a convent school and a private tutor. The only times she left her house was to attend Mass or pray at the sanctuary of Saint Peter. A young nobleman named Britald saw her once and fell in love with her. Every time she left to go to church, he would follow her. Eventually he came forward with his proposal to court her; however, Irene made it clear that she would never marry him. When Britald became depressed, Irene hastened to make it clear to him that the reason for her celibacy was that she had given herself to God as a nun.

Meanwhile, her tutor, a monk named Remigius (or Remígio) made improper advances to her, and when she declined, quit and spread vicious rumors about her. When asked why he was no longer tutoring the girl, he replied that he had left upon having learned that she was pregnant. In addition, he managed to give her a drink that brought about her belly to inflate. All these news circulated around the town, and eventually Britald learned of her supposed infidelity. Enraged, he hired a mercenary soldier to kill her; as Irene was returning home from visiting an elderly disabled man, the assassin approached from behind and killed her with a single stroke of his sword.

== Veneration ==
Her body was thrown into the Nabão River, that flows into the Tagus. Later, it was recovered uncorrupted from this river by Benedictines near the town of Scalabis. Legend says that her uncle abbot Celius had received from Christ a revelation about the true story of her niece and the location of her body. The monks gave her a proper burial, and spread her cultus. Eventually, so great was the reverence paid to the virgin saint, that the name of the town of Scalabis was changed to Santarém ("Saint Irene").

Irene is the patron saint of Tomar and namesake of Santarém. Her feast day is celebrated on 20 October.

== See also ==
- "St. Irene" article in Catalan Wikipedia
- Saint Irene of Tomar, patron saint archive

== Bibliography ==
- Oliveira, Miguel de, Santa Iria e Santarém. Lenda e História. Estudos hagiográficos, Lisboa, União Gráfica, 1964
- Costa, Avelino de Jesus, Santa Iria e Santarém, revisão de um problema hagiográfico e toponímico, Coimbra, FLUC, 1972
