= Paialvo =

- Civil parish
- Location in Portugal
- Coordinates: 39.563°N 8.466°W
- Country: Portugal
- Region: Oeste e Vale do Tejo
- Intermunic. comm.: Médio Tejo
- District: Santarém
- Municipality: Tomar

Area
  - Total: 22.31 km^{2} (8.61 sq mi)

Population (2011)
  - Total: 2,599
  - Density: 120/km^{2} (300/sq mi)
- Time zone: UTC+00:00 (WET)
  - Summer (DST): UTC+01:00 (WEST)

Paialvo is a Portuguese freguesia ("civil parish") located in the municipality of Tomar. The population in 2011 was 2,599, in an area of 22.31 km^{2}.

Paialvo Parish consists of thirteen places/villages: Bexiga, Carrascal, Carrazede, Casal Barreleiro, Charneca da Peralva, Curvaceiras, Delongo, Fontaínhas, Mouchões, Paialvo, Peralva, and Soudos e Vila Nova.

In 1801 its population was 1407 inhabitants.
