= Siege of Tomar =

1190 siege of a Portuguese town

- Part of the Reconquista
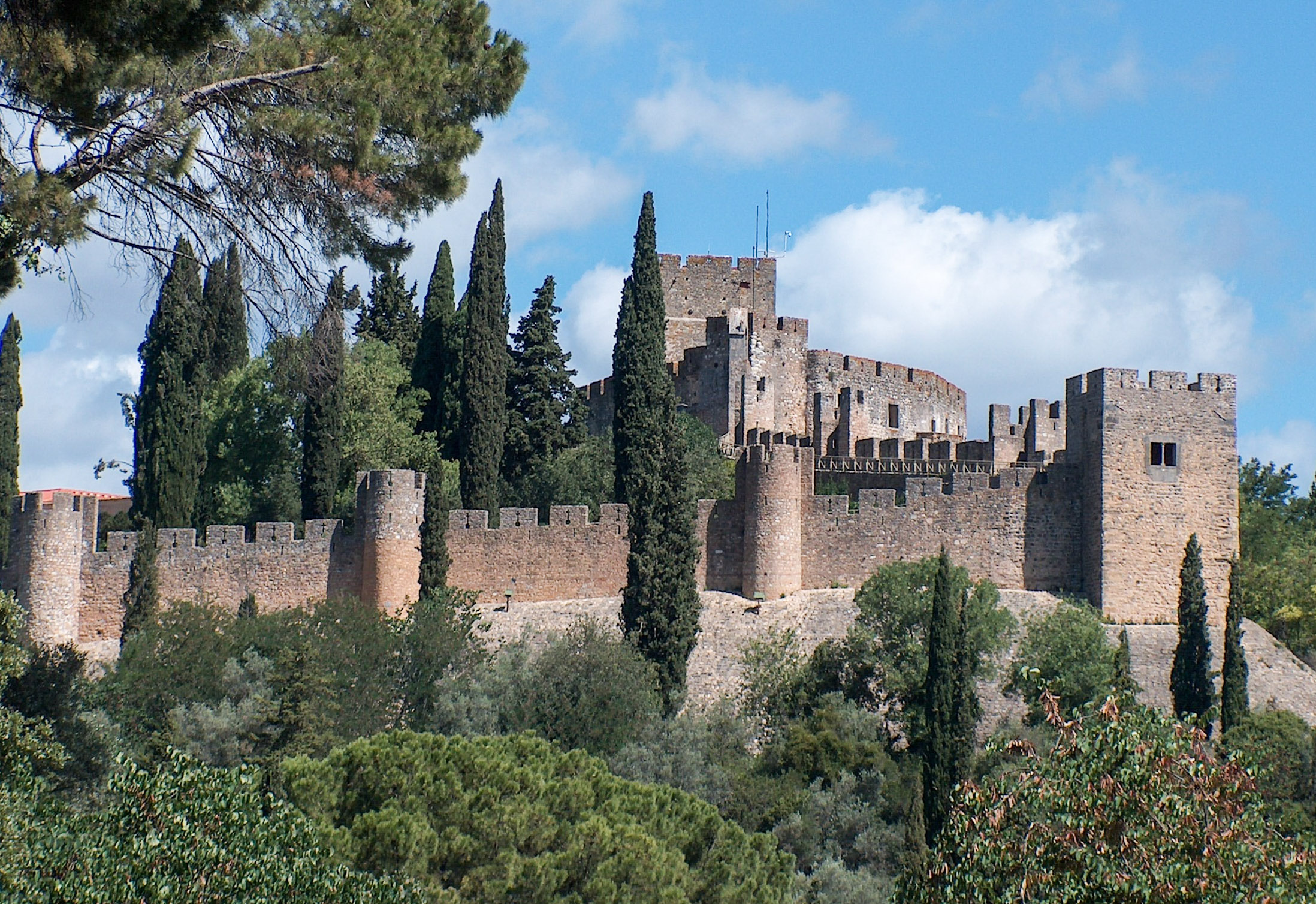
- Citadel of Tomar
Date	5 July – 11 July 1190
Location	Tomar, Portugal
Result	Portuguese victory

Belligerents
Kingdom of Portugal; Templars	Almohad Caliphate

Commanders and leaders
Gualdim Pais	Yaqub al-Mansur

Strength
300 knights	12,000 men

The siege of Tomar was a military engagement that took place in 1190 between the Almohad caliphate who attacked the town of Tomar in Portugal, and the Templar Order, who owned the settlement and successfully defended it from the Muslim attack.

== Context ==
The master of the Templars in Portugal was the formidable Dom Gualdim Pais, who had spent five years in the Holy Land and shortly after his return to Portugal, construction began on the castle of Tomar. Tomar was founded by Pais in March 1, 1160, and became the headquarters of the Order in Portugal. Pais brought innovation and particular attention was paid to the layout and construction of Tomar, as it was the first Templar castle designed as the Orders headquarters in Portugal. It featured a number of military design innovations like a keep, an angled wall and was a clear departure from the typical Iberian castle and featured Muslim elements.

After king Sancho I of Portugal captured the major city of Silves in south-western Iberia, the Almohad caliph Yaqub al-Mansur decided to undertake a number of vigorous campaigns against Portugal. Silves was besieged and a truce was signed with king Alfonso VIII of Castile, leaving al-Mansur free to advance through the Alentejo. Alcácer do Sal, Palmela, Almada, Abrantes were captured and moving north beyond the Tagus River, Torres Novas was captured after four days of resistance. The caliph then split his forces. Some Almohads marched north and reached the walls of Coimbra, destroying Leiria along the way.

== Siege ==
Tomar was then one of the strongest castles in Portugal, defended personally by Dom Gualdim Pais, master of the Templars in Portugal and by then a renowned figure both in the Iberian Peninsula as in the East. The Almohads devastated the environs of Tomar and destroyed the housing outside the castle walls. The Almohad Caliph hoped that an overwhelming display of force would intimidate the Templars into capitulation.

Dom Gualdim Pais conducted a sally with 300 knights against the Almohad army. The Almohads managed to capture the main city gate, but were ultimately repulsed after such bloody combats that the gate became henceforth known as Porta do Sangue or "Blood Gate". Some of the Templars conducted a raid on the Almohad camp through a secret underground tunnel.

Meanwhile, a number of English and French crusader vessels called at Silves and Lisbon. Sancho was at Lisbon at the time and with the support of these reinforcements, the king rejected Yaqub's peace proposals, which involved relinquishing Silves, and marched out to relieve Santarém. Facing stronger resistance than expected, the caliph ordered a withdrawal of all his forces. The Muslims were only able to ravage the unfortified outer suburbs of Tomar.

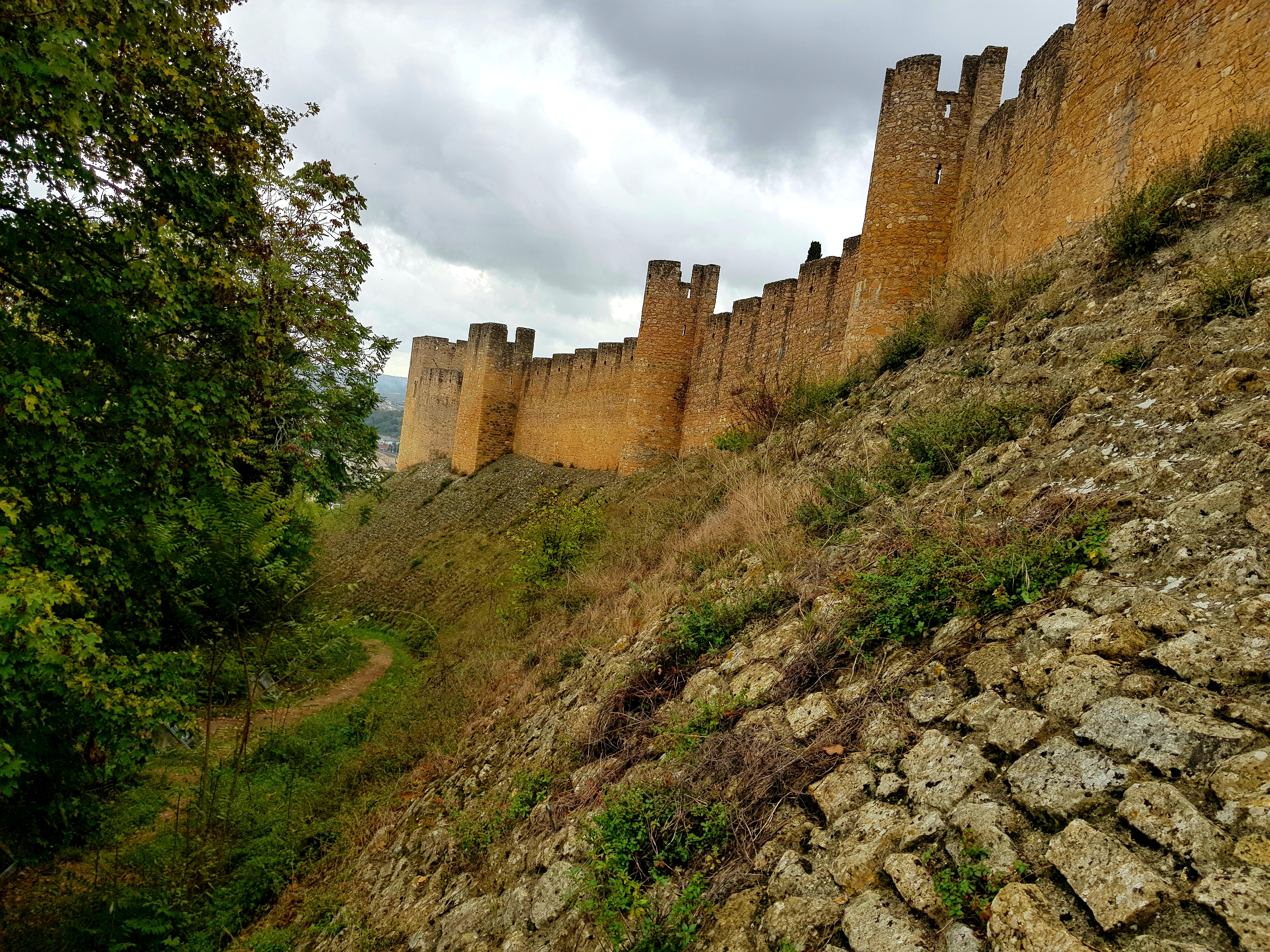
Walls of Tomar.

== Aftermath ==
The Templars broke the impetus of the Almohad offensive. The successful defense of Tomar confirmed the military prowess of the Templars and established the Order as an indispensable part of the defense of Portugal. The relatively short action was since recounted in Templar annals as a great victory. Afterwards, the Order rejoined the Portuguese efforts at recapturing territory from the Muslims more actively.

== See also ==
- Portugal in the Reconquista
- Portuguese conquest of Lisbon
- Siege of Silves (1189)
- Siege of Santarém (1184)
- Almohad campaign against Portugal (1190–1191)
- Almohad wars in the Iberian Peninsula
