= Gualdim Pais =

Portuguese crusader (1118–1195)

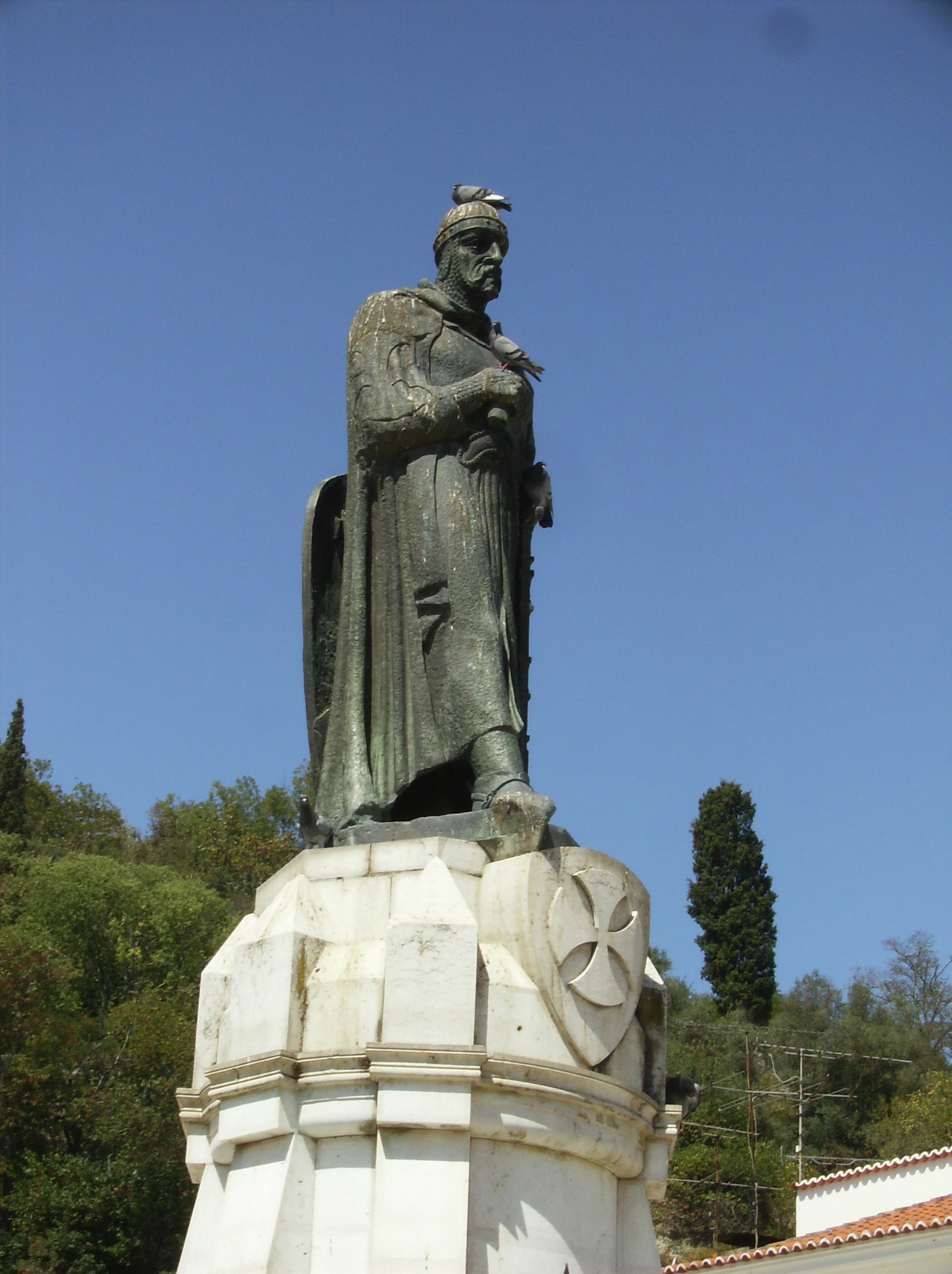
- Monument to Dom Gualdim Pais at Tomar, Portugal.
- Born: 4 March 1118; Amares, County of Portugal
- Died: 13 October 1195 (aged 77); Tomar, Kingdom of Portugal
- Occupations: Crusader, Knight Templar

Dom Gualdim Pais (4 March 1118 – 13 October 1195) was a Portuguese crusader, Knight Templar in the service of Afonso Henriques of Portugal. He was the founder of the city of Tomar.

== Biography ==
Gualdim Pais was the son of Paio Ramires and Guntroda Soares, paternal grandson of Ramires Aires and great-grandson of Aires Carpinteiro. His brother Vasco Pais Ramirão was alcaide-mor of Coimbra. His family belonged to the rural nobility, originally from Entre-Douro-e-Minho, settled on sowing lands in the Ave River basin on its right bank. It is known that at a certain point he took up residence in Braga and that he was educated at an ecclesiastical school, possibly that of the Cathedral of Braga and such was his connection with the city that several epigraphs on the castles he founded proclaim him as being from there: e.g. «MAGISTER GALDINUS NOBILI SIQUI / DEM GENERE BRACARA ORIUNDUS[...]».

He fought alongside Afonso Henriques against the Moors, and received a knighthood by him in 1139, after the Battle of Ourique. He departed for Palestine shortly thereafter, and during the next five years fought as a Knight Templar. He had a prominent role in the siege of the city of Gaza. He also fought in the Siege of Ascalon; in sieges and battles around Sidon and Antioch, and other campaigns of the Zengid–Crusader and Fatimid-Cruzader wars, against the Sultans of Egypt and Syria.

He was ordained the fourth Grand Master in Portugal of the Order of Knights Templar in 1157, which then was ruled from Braga, where the Archbishop D. Paio Mendes gave them land corresponding today to the Hospital of Saint Marcus. He founded the Castle of Tomar in 1160, then near the frontier with the Muslim states, and transferred the seat of the order there. The famous Round Church of the Castle of Tomar, inspired by similar structures in Jerusalem, was built under his supervision. He issued a feudal charter (foral), to the town of Tomar in 1162. During his life, he supervised the building or restoration of several other frontier castles for the Templars: the Almourol, Idanha, Ceres, Monsanto and Pombal (founding the settlement of Pombal and issuing a foral in 1174).

Besieged in 1190 by vastly superior forces under the Almohad King of Morocco Yusuf I, he and his knights managed to defeat the monarch's forces, thus defending the north of the fledgling Kingdom.

He died in Tomar in the year 1195. His grave is located in the Church of Santa Maria do Olival in that city.

== See also ==
- Portugal in the Reconquista

== Sources ==
- Murray, Alan V. (2006). The Crusades: An Encyclopedia 3 Volume. Santa Barbara: ABC-Clio. ISBN 1576078620.
