= Nabão River =

River in northern Portugal

Coordinates: 39°31′13″N 8°21′21″W

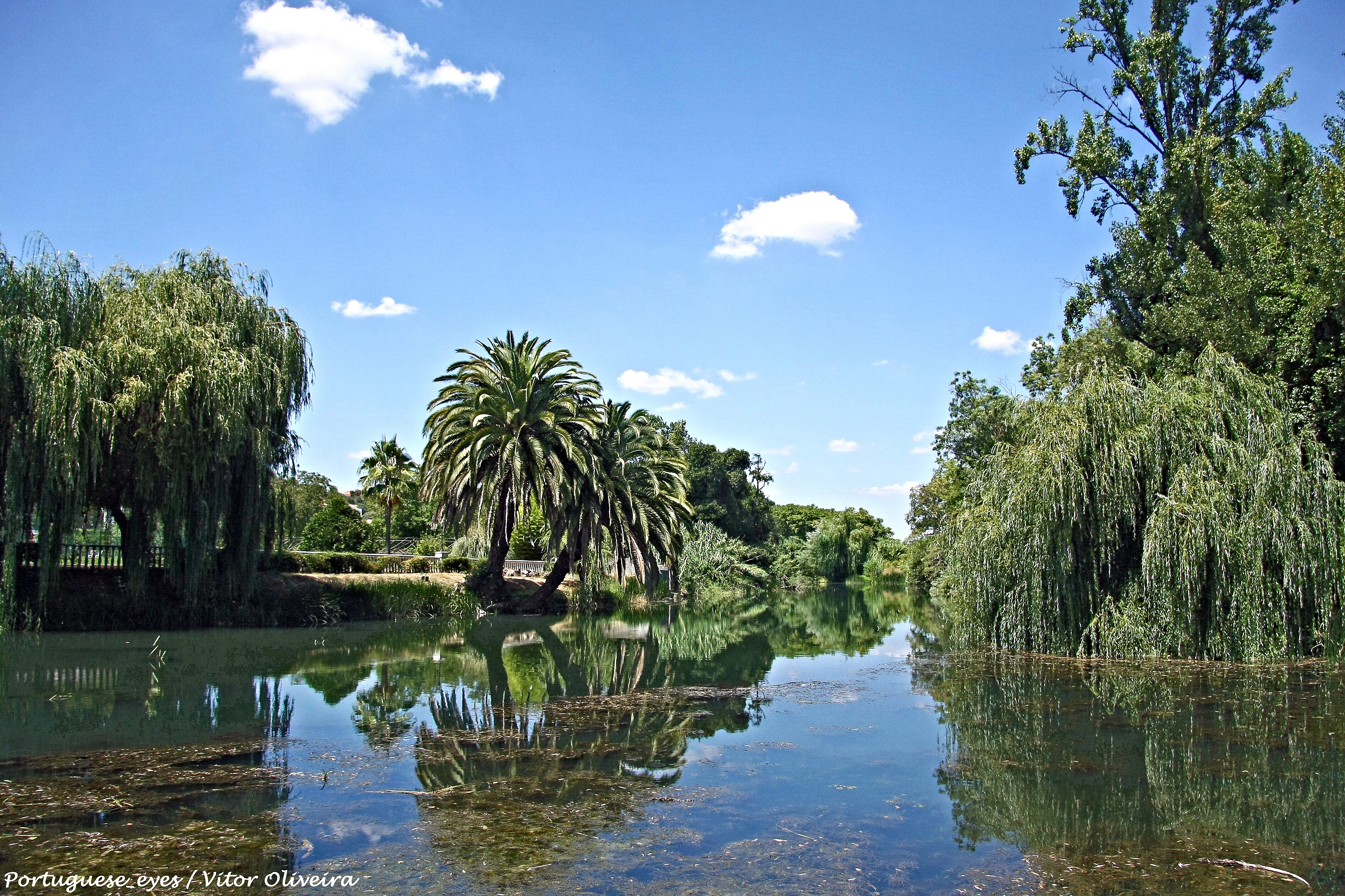
The Nabão in Tomar

The Nabão (Portuguese pronunciation: [nɐˈbɐ̃w]) is a river in Portugal. It rises in Ansião and passes through the city of Tomar before joining the Zêzere River — a course of about 66 kilometres (41 mi). It was known to the Romans as Nabanus. The swift waters of the Nabão once fed the factories of Tomar.

The river is associated with the tale of Santa Iria.

In 2013, development work in Tomar includes construction of road and foot bridges, promenades and gardens.
