= Tomar =

Town and municipality in Portugal

- Municipality
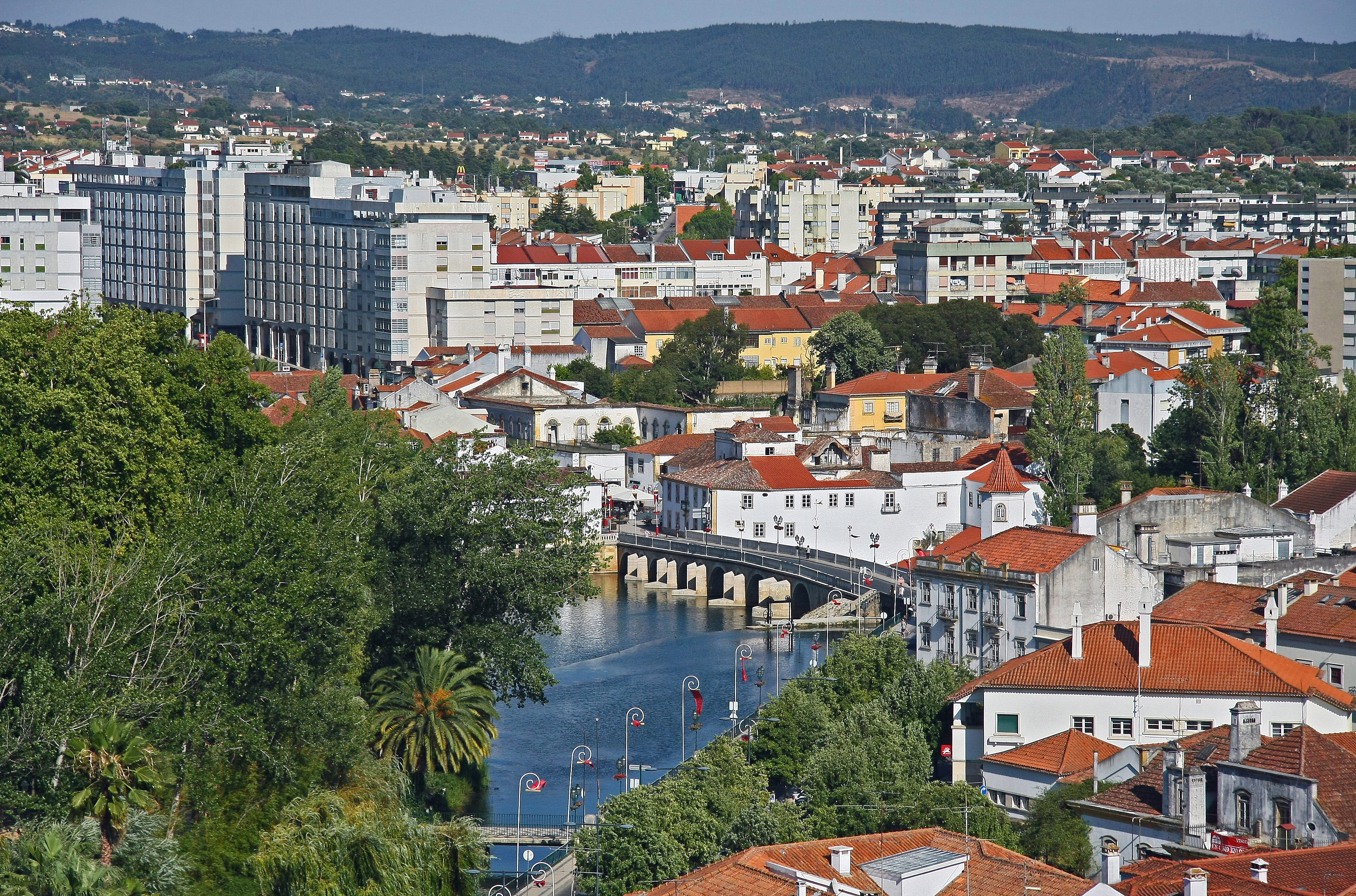
- View of the town of Tomar and the Nabão river

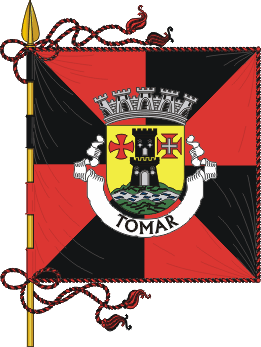
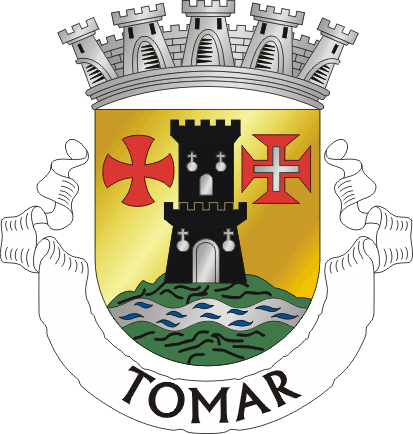
- Flag Coat of arms
- Interactive map of Tomar
- Coordinates: 39°36′N 8°25′W
- Country: Portugal
- Region: Oeste e Vale do Tejo
- Intermunic. comm.: Médio Tejo
- District: Santarém
- Parishes: 11

Government
  - President: Anabela Freitas (PS)

Area
  - Total: 351.20 km^{2} (135.60 sq mi)

Population (2011)
  - Total: 40,677
  - Density: 115.82/km^{2} (299.98/sq mi)
- Time zone: UTC+00:00 (WET)
  - Summer (DST): UTC+01:00 (WEST)
- Local holiday: March 1
- Website: http://www.cm-tomar.pt

Tomar (Portuguese pronunciation: [tuˈmaɾ]), also known in English as Thomar, is a Portuguese city and a municipality in the historical Ribatejo Portuguese province, and in Santarém district. The town proper has a population of about 20,000. The municipality population in 2011 was 40,677, in an area of 351.20 km^{2} (135.60 sq mi).

The town of Tomar was created inside the walls of the Convento de Cristo, constructed under the orders of Gualdim de Pais, the fourth Grand Master of the Knights Templar in Portugal in the late 12th century.

Tomar was the last Templar town to be commissioned for construction and one of Portugal's historical jewels. The town was especially important in the 15th century when it was a center of Portuguese overseas expansion under Henry the Navigator, the Grand Master of the Order of Christ, successor organization to the Knights Templar in Portugal.

== Geography ==
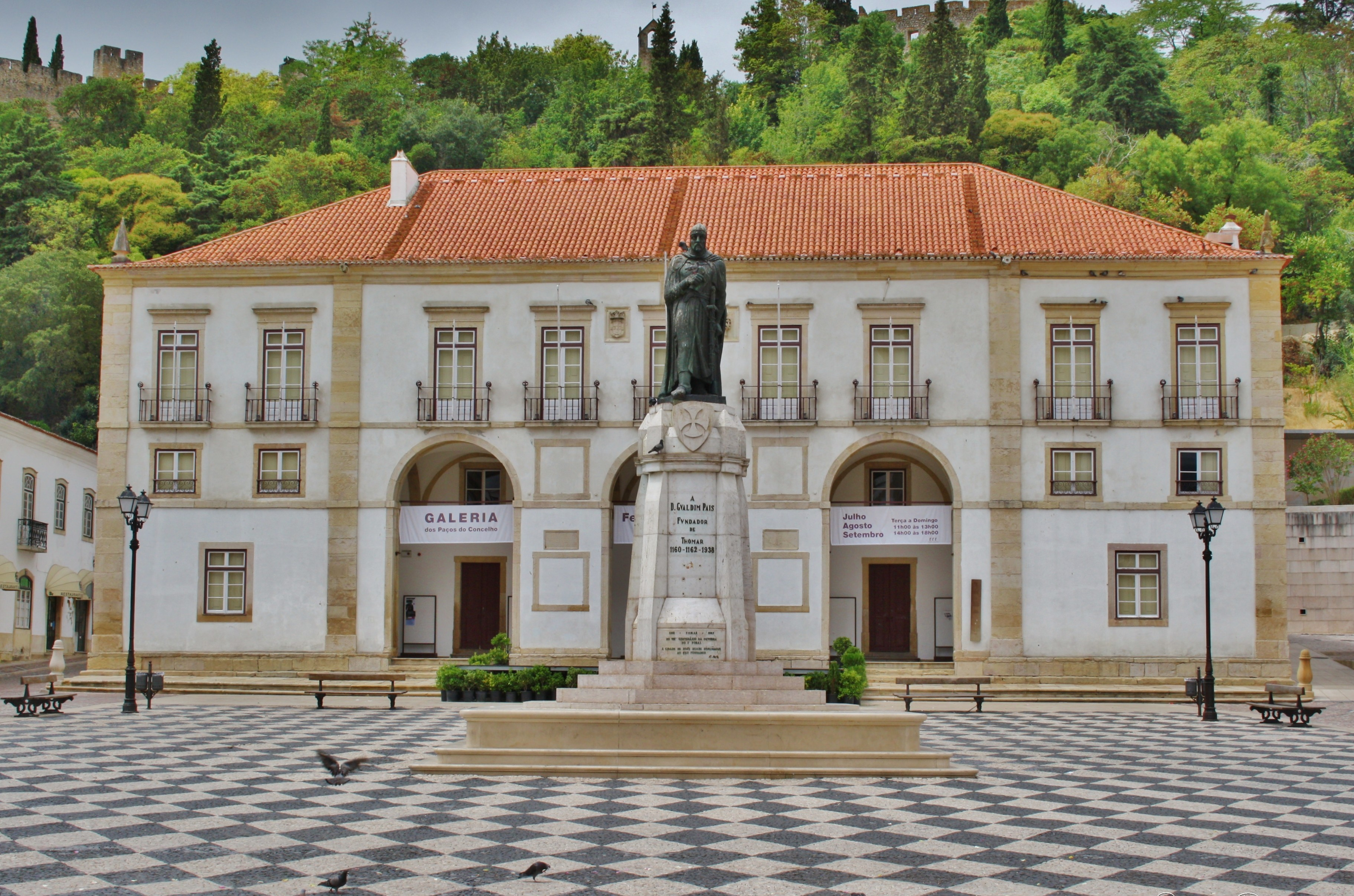
Praça da República (Republic Square) and Paços do Concelho (17th century Town Hall), in Tomar. The bronze statue represents Gualdim Pais, founder of the town.

Tomar lies in the most fertile region of Portugal, and one of the most fertile in the whole of the Iberian Peninsula: the Ribatejo ("by the river Tagus") meadows. It is located in the district of Santarém. The predominant landscape is agricultural, consisting of olive, pine, fig, and eucalyptus trees.

The seat of the municipality is the city of Tomar, which comprises the parishes of Santa Maria dos Olivais and São João Batista. Tomar is also the capital of the Médio Tejo (Mid-Tagus river) region.

The Nabão River cuts across what was the ancient city of Nabantia: its inhabitants are called Nabantinos.

=== Parishes ===
Administratively, the municipality is divided into 11 civil parishes (freguesias):

- Além da Ribeira e Pedreira
- Asseiceira
- Carregueiros
- Casais e Alviobeira
- Madalena e Beselga
- Olalhas
- Paialvo
- Sabacheira
- São Pedro de Tomar
- Tomar (São João Baptista) e Santa Maria dos Olivais
- Serra e Junceira

== History ==
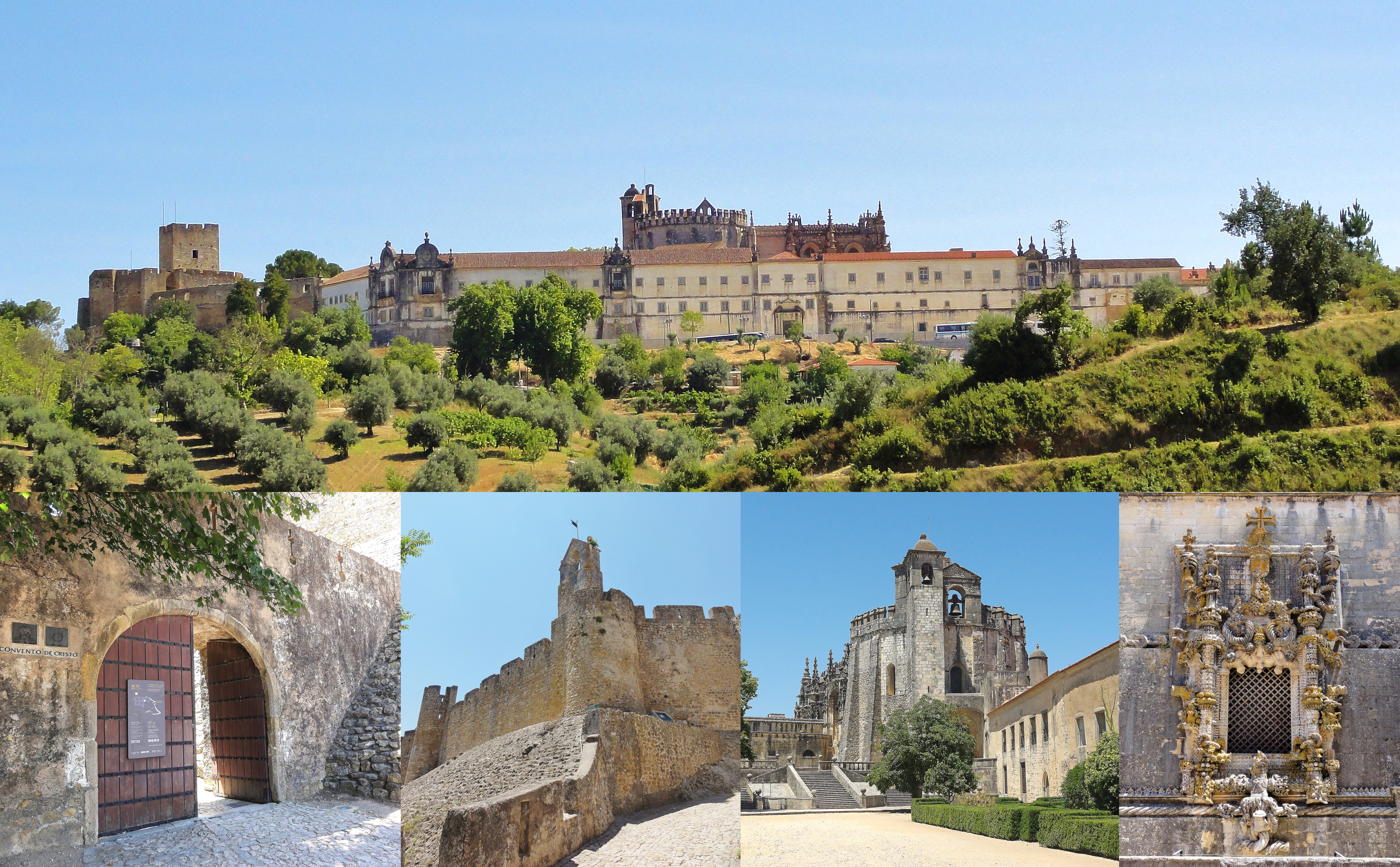
Castle and Convent of the Knights Templar of Tomar; transferred in 1344 to the Knights of the Order of Christ

Under the modern city lies the Roman city of Sellium. After the conquest of the region from the Moors in the Portuguese Reconquista, the land was granted in 1159 as a fief to the Order of the Knights Templar. In 1160, Gualdim Pais, the Order's Grand master in Portugal and Tomar's somewhat mythical founder, laid the first stone of the Castle and Convent of the Knights Templar that would become the headquarters of the Order in Portugal.

Local traditional legends preach that the choice was for mystical reasons and by divine inspiration, and from practices by the Grand Master of geomancy, based on exercises taken from luck and predestination. Reinforcing this magical view is the setting of the site among a small chain of seven elevations (lugar dos sete montes), which became known as the city of seven hills, as the seven hills of Jerusalem, the seven hills of Rome or the seven columns of Constantinople.

The foral or feudal contract was granted in 1162 by the Grand Master to the people. The Templars ruled from Tomar a vast region of central Portugal which they pledged to defend from Moorish attacks and raids. Like many lords of the unpopulated former frontier region of central Portugal, the villagers were given relatively liberal conditions in comparison with those of the northern regions of Portugal, in order to attract new immigrants. Those inhabitants who could sustain a horse were obliged to pay military service in return for privileges. They were not allowed the title of Knight which was reserved to the Templars. Women were also admitted to the Order, although they did not fight.

In 1190 Abu Yusuf Yaqub al-Mansur, an Almohad caliph, and his army attacked Tomar. However the knights and their 72-year-old leader, Gualdim Pais, kept them at bay. A plaque commemorates this bloody battle at the Porta do Sangue at the Castelo Templário (Castle of Tomar).

In 1314, under pressure from the Pope Clement V, the order was suppressed. Philip IV of France, who owed the Templars huge debts, held the pope a virtual prisoner and coerced him to suppress the order on bases of false accusations and forced confessions. The Order was suppressed in most of Europe and its holdings were to be transferred to the Knights Hospitaller. Instead, King Dinis negotiated the transfer of the Order's possessions and personnel in Portugal to a newly created Order of Christ. This Order moved in 1319 to Castro Marim, but in 1356 it returned to Tomar.

In the 15th century and thereafter, the (ordained) Grand Master of the Order was nominated by the Pope and the (lay) Master or Governor by the King, instead of being elected by the monks. Henry the Navigator was made the Governor of the Order, and it is believed that he used the resources and knowledge of the Order to succeed in his enterprises in Africa and in the Atlantic. The Order of Christ Cross was painted in the sails of the caravels that crossed the seas, and the Catholic missions in the new lands were under the authority of the Tomar clerics until 1514.

Henry, enriched by his overseas enterprises, was the first ruler to improve the buildings of the Convento de Cristo since their construction by Gualdim Pais. He also ordered dams to be built to control the Nabão River and swamps to be drained. This allowed the burgeoning town to attract more settlers. Henry ordered the new streets to be designed in a rational, geometrical fashion, as they can still be seen today.

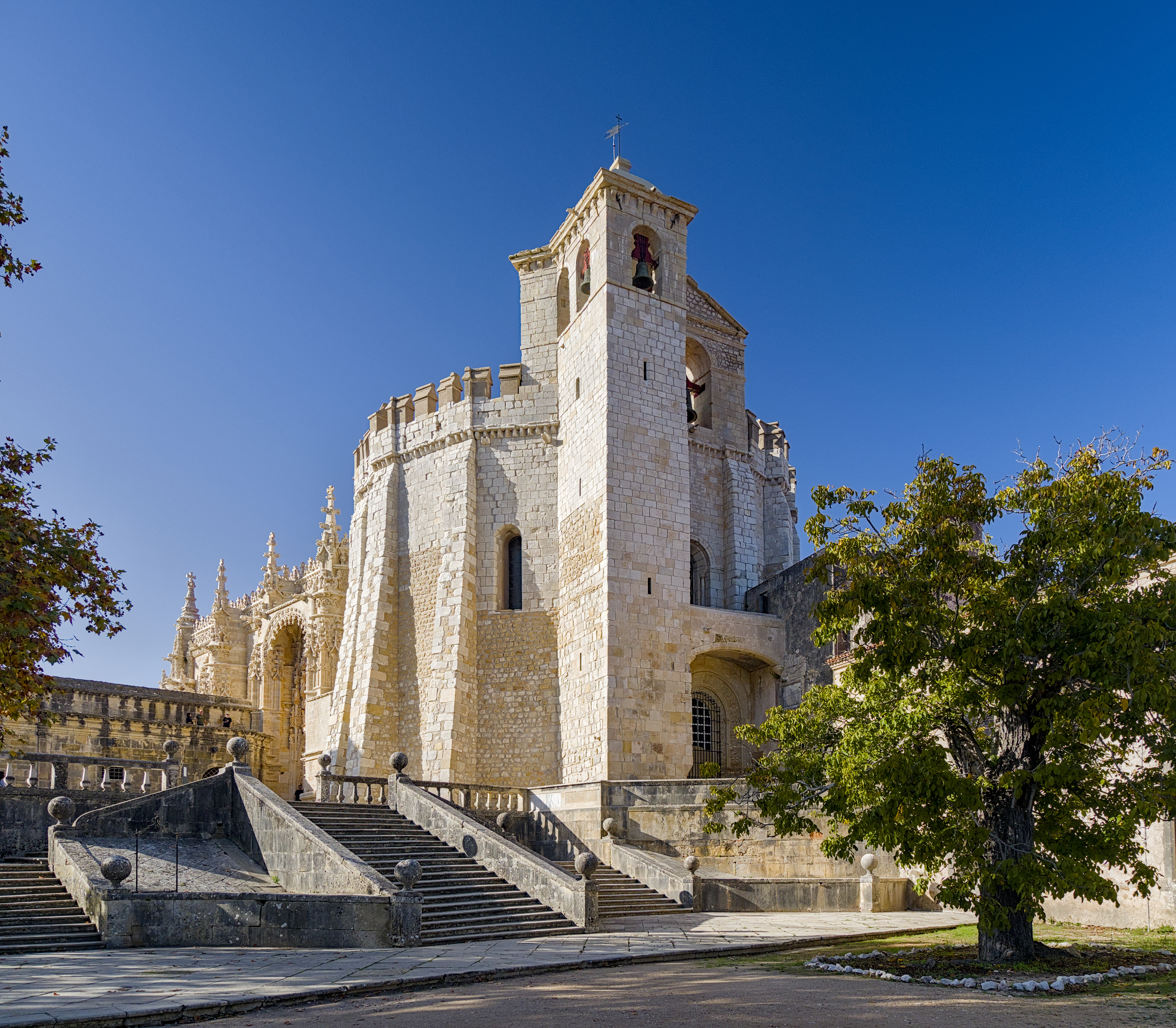
View of the round Templar church (12th century) of the Convent of the Order of Christ

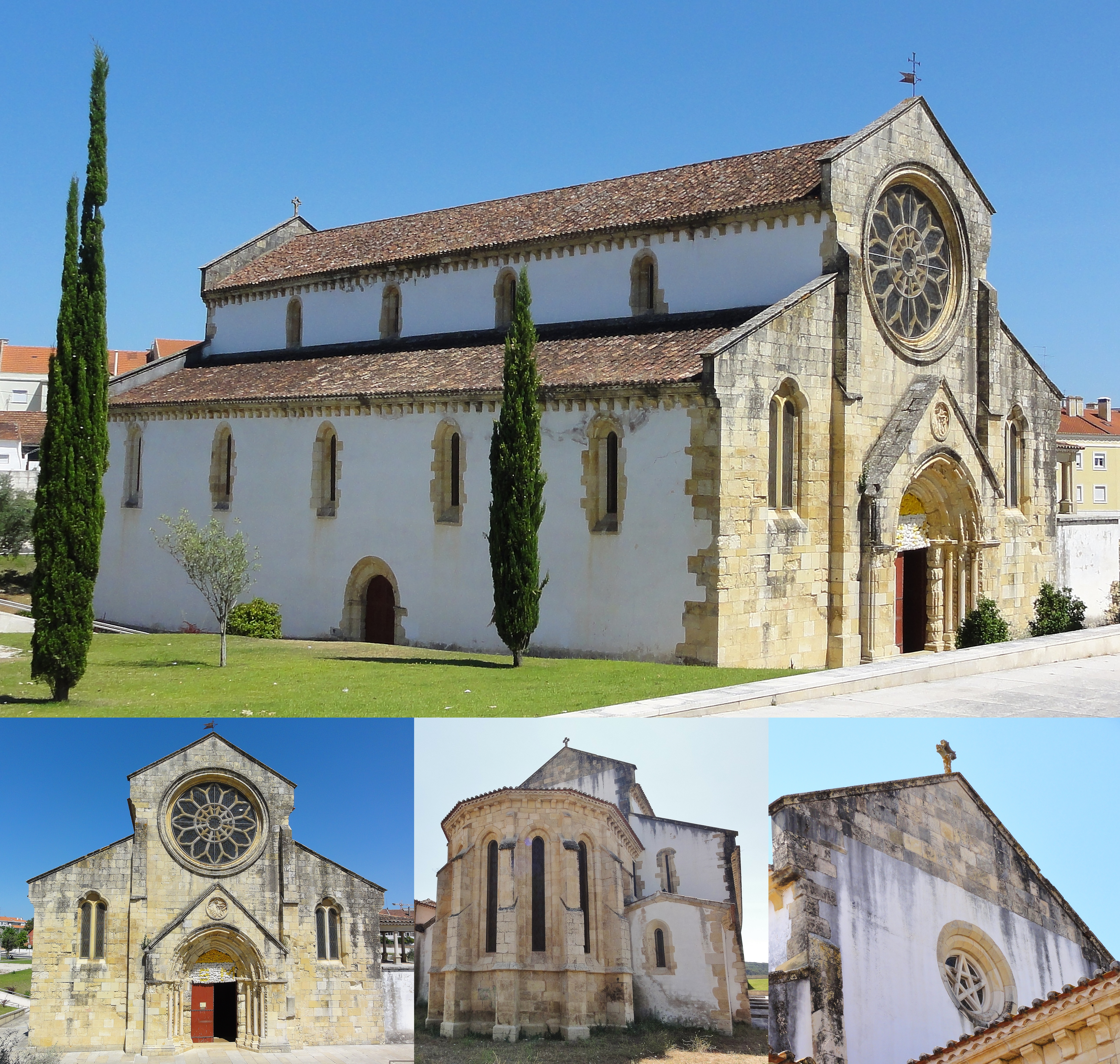
Church of Santa Maria do Olival, burial place for the Knights Templar of Tomar

In 1438, King Duarte, who had fled Lisbon because of the Black Death, died here.

Just after 1492 with the expulsion of Jews from Spain, the town increased further with Jewish refugee artisans and traders. The very large Jewish minority dynamized the city with new trades and skills. Their experience was vital in the success of the new trade routes with Africa. The original synagogue, the Synagogue of Tomar still stands. It is allegedly the best-preserved medieval synagogue in Portugal. The mikvah was discovered during excavations in 1985.

In the reign of Manuel I of Portugal the convent took its final form within the Manueline renaissance style. With the growing importance of the town as master of Portugal's overseas empire, the leadership of the Order was granted to the King by the Pope.

However, under pressure from the monarchs of Spain, the King soon proclaimed by edict that all the Jews remaining within the territory of Portugal would be after a short period considered Christians, although simultaneously he forbade them to leave, fearing that the exodus of Jewish men of knowledge and capital would harm Portugal's burgeoning commercial empire. Jews were largely undisturbed as nominal Christians for several decades, until the establishment of a Tribunal of the Portuguese Inquisition by the initiative of the clergy in the town. Under persecution, wealthier Jews fled, while most others were forced to convert.

Hundreds of both Jews and New Christians were arrested, tortured and about 1,000 were executed in autos da fé, in a frenzy of persecution that peaked around 1550. Many others (c. 38,000) were expropriated of their property or penance. Jewish ascendancy, more than Jewish religion, together with personal wealth determined who would be persecuted, since the expropriations reverted to the institution of the Inquisition itself. With the persecution of its merchants and professionals Tomar lost most of its relevance as a trading centre. New Christian names among the inhabitants are very common today.

In 1581 the city was the seat of the Portuguese Cortes (feudal parliament) which acclaimed the King of Spain Felipe II as Portugal's Filipe I (see Iberian Union).

During the 18th century Tomar was one of the first regions of Portugal to develop industry. In the reign of Maria I, with royal support, a textile factory of Jácome Ratton was established against the opposition of the Order. The hydraulic resources of the river Nabão were used to supply energy to this and many other factories, namely paper factories, foundries, glassworks, silks and soaps.

Tomar was occupied by the French during the Peninsular War, against which it rebelled. The Duke of Wellington, with his Portuguese and English troops, liberated the city afterwards.

In 1834 all the religious orders, including the Order of Christ, were disbanded.

== Transport ==
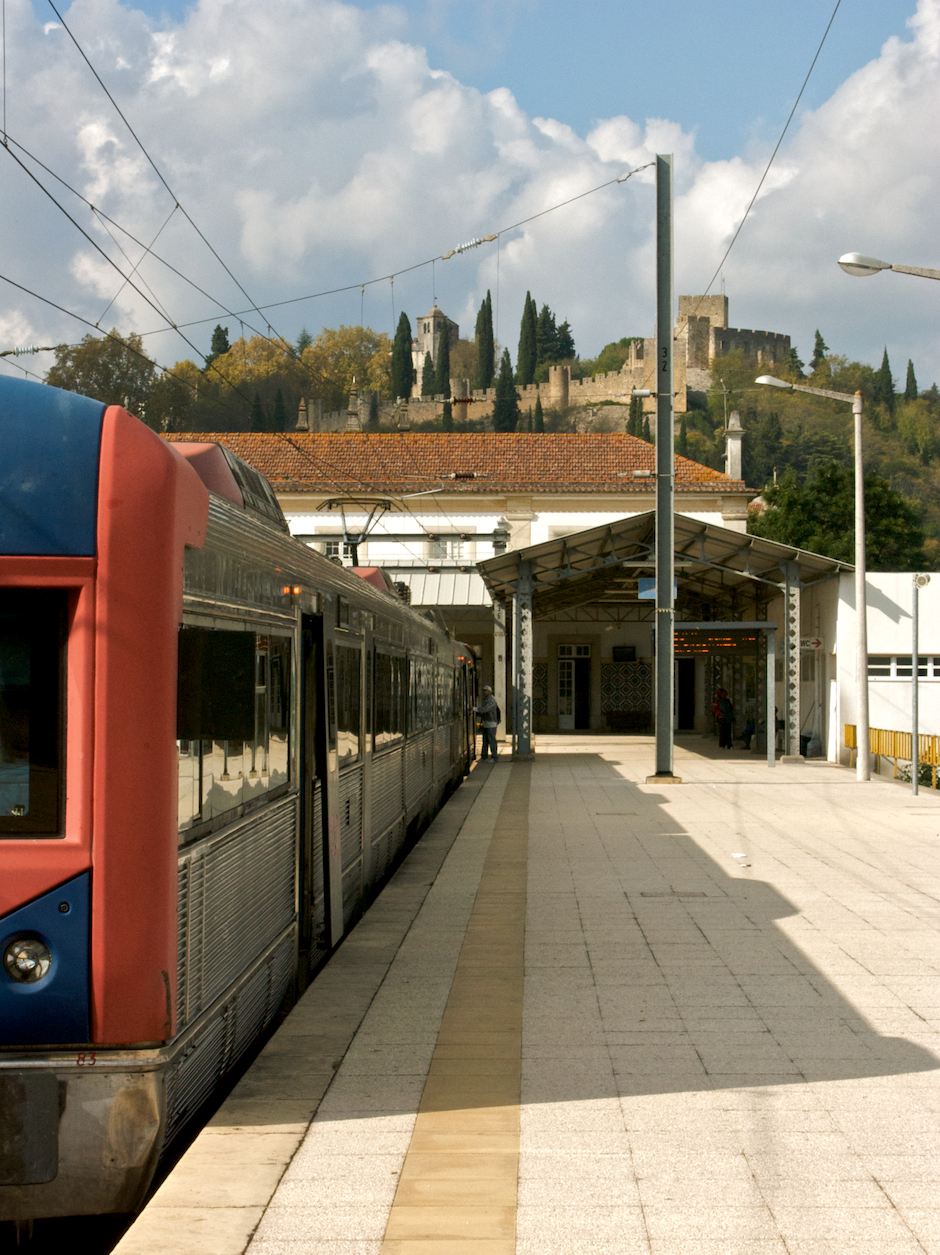
The castle and convent seen from the railway station

Tomar is served by Tomar railway station, the terminus of the Tomar branch line from Lamarosa, where it connects with the Northern line of the Portuguese railway system.

== Schools and education ==
Tomar has several schools including primary, junior high school, high schools and a polytechnic. These include:

- Escola do 1º Ciclo dos Templários – primary school
- Escola do 1º Ciclo de Santo António – primary school
- Escola do 1º Ciclo de Infante D. Henrique – primary school
- Escola do Ensino Básico 2+3 Gualdim Pais – junior high school
- Escola do Ensino Básico 2+3 D. Nuno Álvares Pereira – junior high school, former high school and the oldest one in the town.
- Escola do Ensino Básico 2+3 de Santa Iria – junior high school
- Escola Secundária Santa Maria do Olival – high school
- Escola Secundária Jácome Ratton – high school
- Instituto Politécnico de Tomar – polytechnic

== Attractions ==
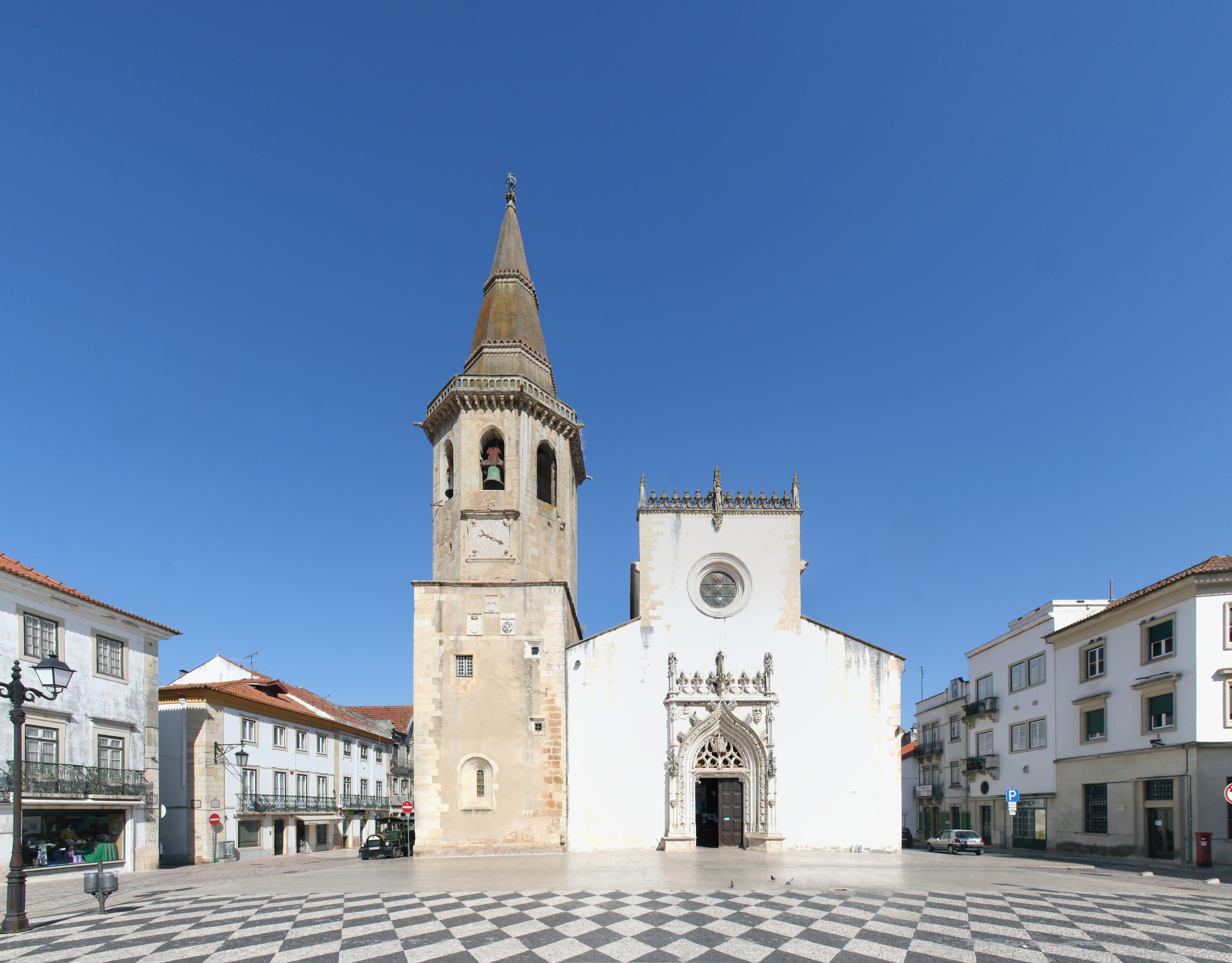
Church of São João Baptista (15-16th centuries) in the centre of Tomar.

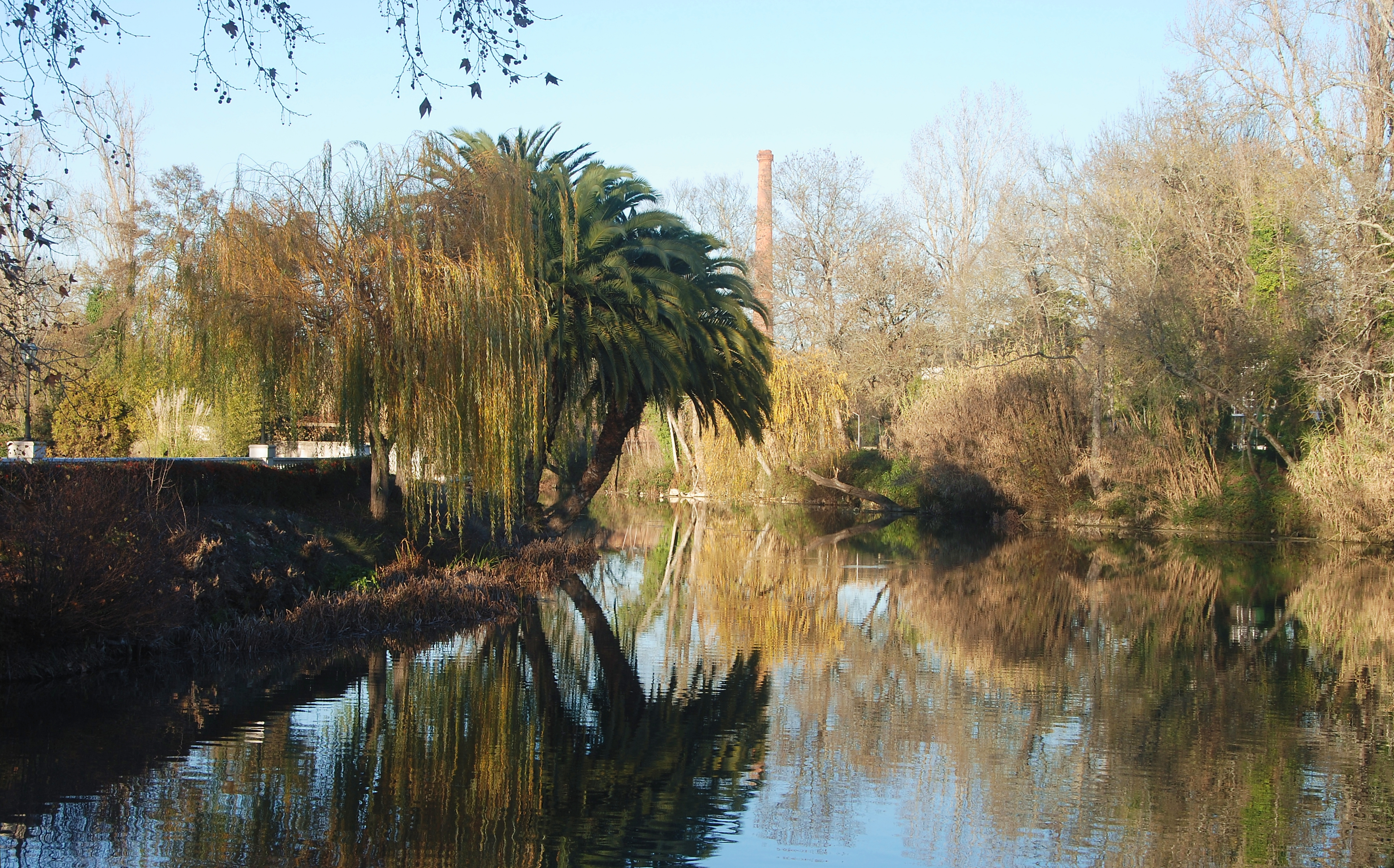
View of the park, with river Nabão

Tomar attracts many tourists because of its varied monuments. These include:

- Castle and Convent of the Order of Christ – Unesco World Heritage Site: An ensemble of 12th to 16th century architecture and art, it is the main monument of the city and one of the most important in Portugal.
- Pegões Aqueduct – Built between 1503 and 1614 to bring water to the convent of Christ in Tomar under command of king Philip I, the aqueduct is 6 kilometers long and in places reaches a height of 30 meters. It is the biggest and most important construction of Philip I in Portugal.
- Church of Santa Maria do Olival: This 13th-century Gothic church was built as a burial ground for the Knights Templar and their treasure.
- Synagogue of Tomar: the best preserved mediaeval synagogue of Portugal (and one of two pre-expulsion Synagogues in the country), built in the mid-15th century the Jewish community of Tomar. Since 1939 it houses the Jewish Museum Abraão Zacuto, with pieces related to Jewish history in Portugal.
- Church of Saint John the Baptist (São João Baptista): The main church of Tomar is located in the main square of the town, in front of the Municipality (17th century) and a modern statue of Gualdim Pais. The church was built between the 15th and 16th centuries. In addition to its architectural interest it is noted for several panels painted in the 1530s by one of Portugal's most renowned Renaissance artists, Gregório Lopes.
- Chapel of Our Lady of the Conception (Nossa Senhora da Conceição): Chapel built between 1532 and 1540 in pure Renaissance style, begun by João de Castilho and finished by Diogo de Torralva. It was intended to be the burial chapel of King John III.
- Church and Convent of Saint Iria: An early 16th-century building located near the Nabão river.
- Museu dos Fosforos (Matchbox Museum) – The biggest private matchbox collection in Europe.
- Museu de Arte Moderna – Colecção José Augusto França (art gallery)
- Casa Museu Fernando Lopes Graça
- Casa dos Cubos (art gallery)

The streets and squares of the picturesque centre of Tomar are organised following a chessboard pattern, a rare feature for a mediaeval city, instituted by Prince Henry the Navigator, which later inspired the pattern used for the rebuilding of Lisbon after the earthquake in 1755. Scattered throughout the town there are many interesting houses with Renaissance, Baroque and Romantic façades. By the river Nabão, near the bridge, there is a park and garden that offer views of the city and surroundings.

== Local festival and events ==
=== Festivals ===
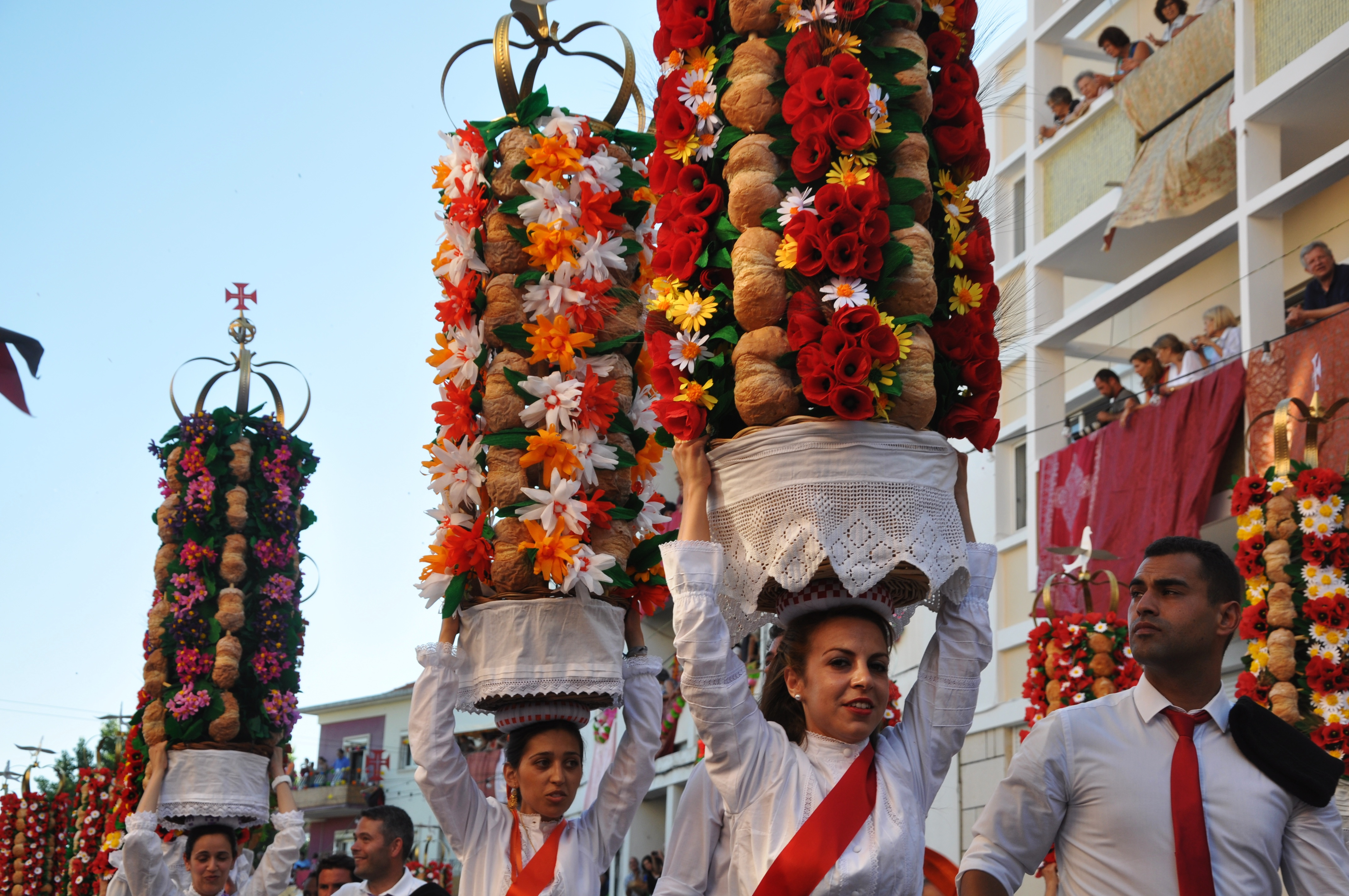
Festa dos Tabuleiros

- Festa dos Tabuleiros (Trays Festival), an ancient tradition in Tomar, is the most important festival celebrated in the city, attracting people from all over the world. The festival is held every four years, the last being held in June and July 2023. The local population parades in pairs with the girls carrying tabuleiros on their heads. The tabuleiro is made of 30 stacked pieces of bread, either in 6 rows of 5 or 5 rows of 6, decorated with flowers. At the top of the tabuleiro is a crown which normally contains either a white dove, symbolising the Holy Spirit, or the esfera armilar (armillary sphere), a symbol of the historical Portuguese maritime expansion.
- Festa de Santa Iria
- Nossa Senhora da Piedade (religious festival) - held on the first Sunday in September
- Festival Estatuas Vivas de Tomar
- Congress of Soups of Tomar
- Festival Bons Sons (Cem Soldos) - one of the most popular Portuguese music festivals
- Festival Internacional de Tunas da Cidade de Tomar
- Tomarimbando - Festival de Percussão de Tomar
- Feira da Laranja Conventual
- Beer Fest of Tomar
- Summer fests in Tomar district – Serra Tomar is the largest one
- Remember PimPim (1980s music festival)
- Knights Templar Festival

=== Holidays ===
The municipal holiday day is March 1, and commemorates the day when the Templars' Master D. Gualdim founded the Templar City in 1160.

=== Local food specialities ===
- Fatias de Tomar

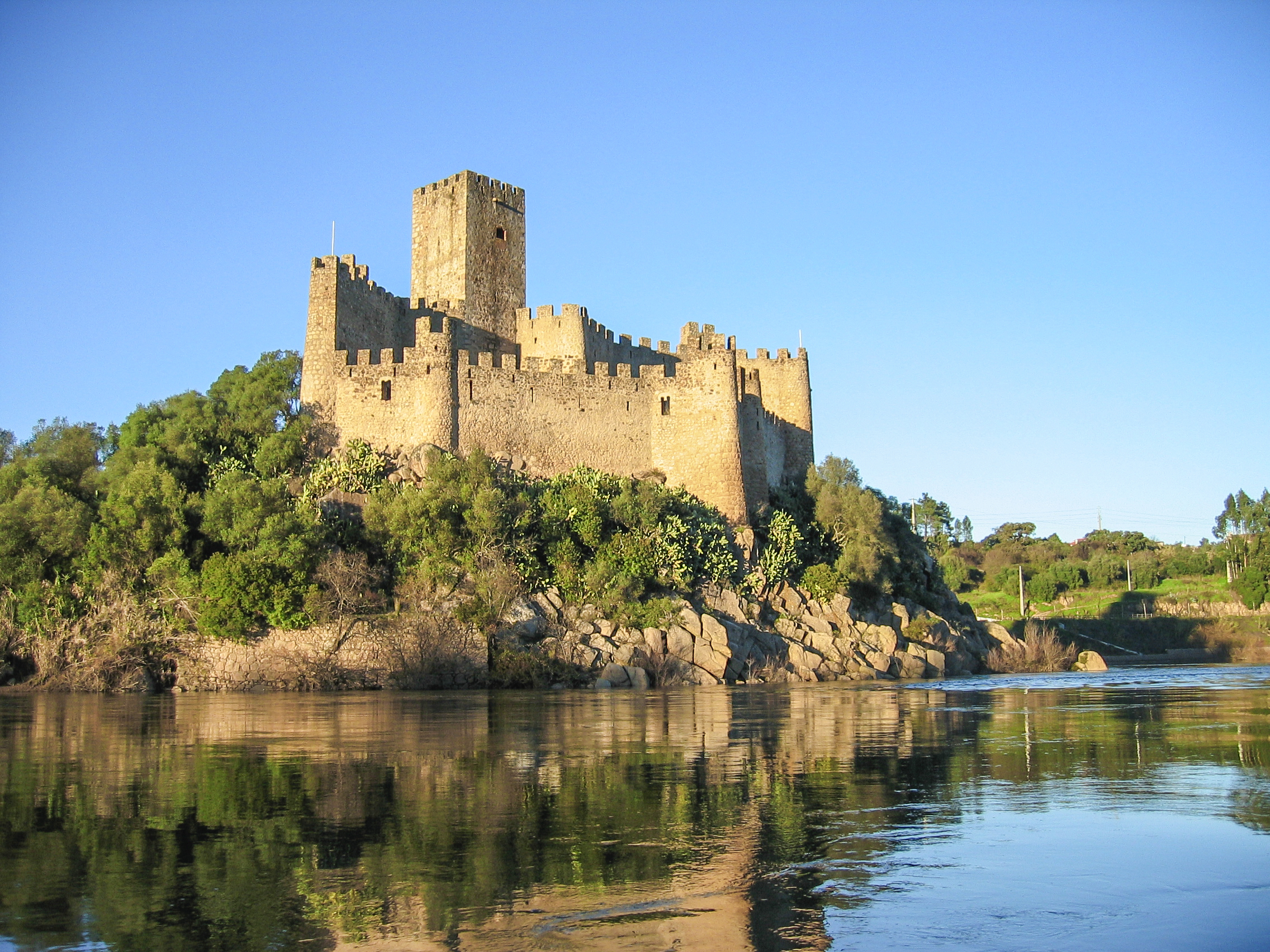
Castle of Almourol

=== Myths ===
- The Castle of Almourol nearby is where several bad events (deaths and tragic love stories) have taken place and is supposed to be haunted by a princess.

== International relations ==
Tomar is twinned with:

- Emden, Germany

== Notable people ==
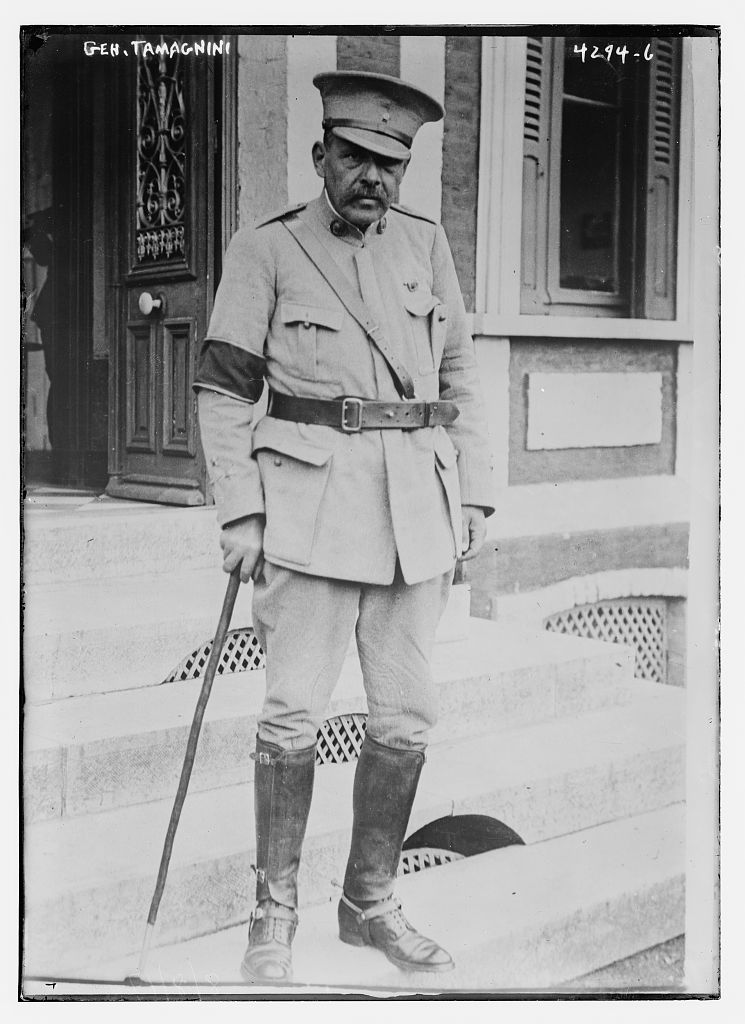
Fernando Tamagnini de Abreu e Silva, 1917

- Saint Irene of Tomar (c. 635 – c. 653), Christian martyr
- Angela Tamagnini (1770–1827), smallpox vaccination pioneer, resisted the French invasion during the Napoleonic Wars
- Fernando Tamagnini de Abreu e Silva (1856–1924), cavalry officer and general of the Portuguese Army
- Fernando Lopes-Graça (1906–1994), composer, conductor and musicologist
- Nuno Viriato Tavares de Melo Egídio (1922–2011), general and Governor of Macau
- Isabel Ruth (born 1940), actress
- João Henriques (born 1972), football manager
- Ana Laíns (born 1979), fado singer
- Patrícia Sampaio (born 1999), judoka, 2024 Olympic Bronze winner

== See also ==
- Tomar IPR
