= Fort Nossa Senhora das Salvas =

- Forte de Nossa Senhora das Salvas
- Sines, Portugal
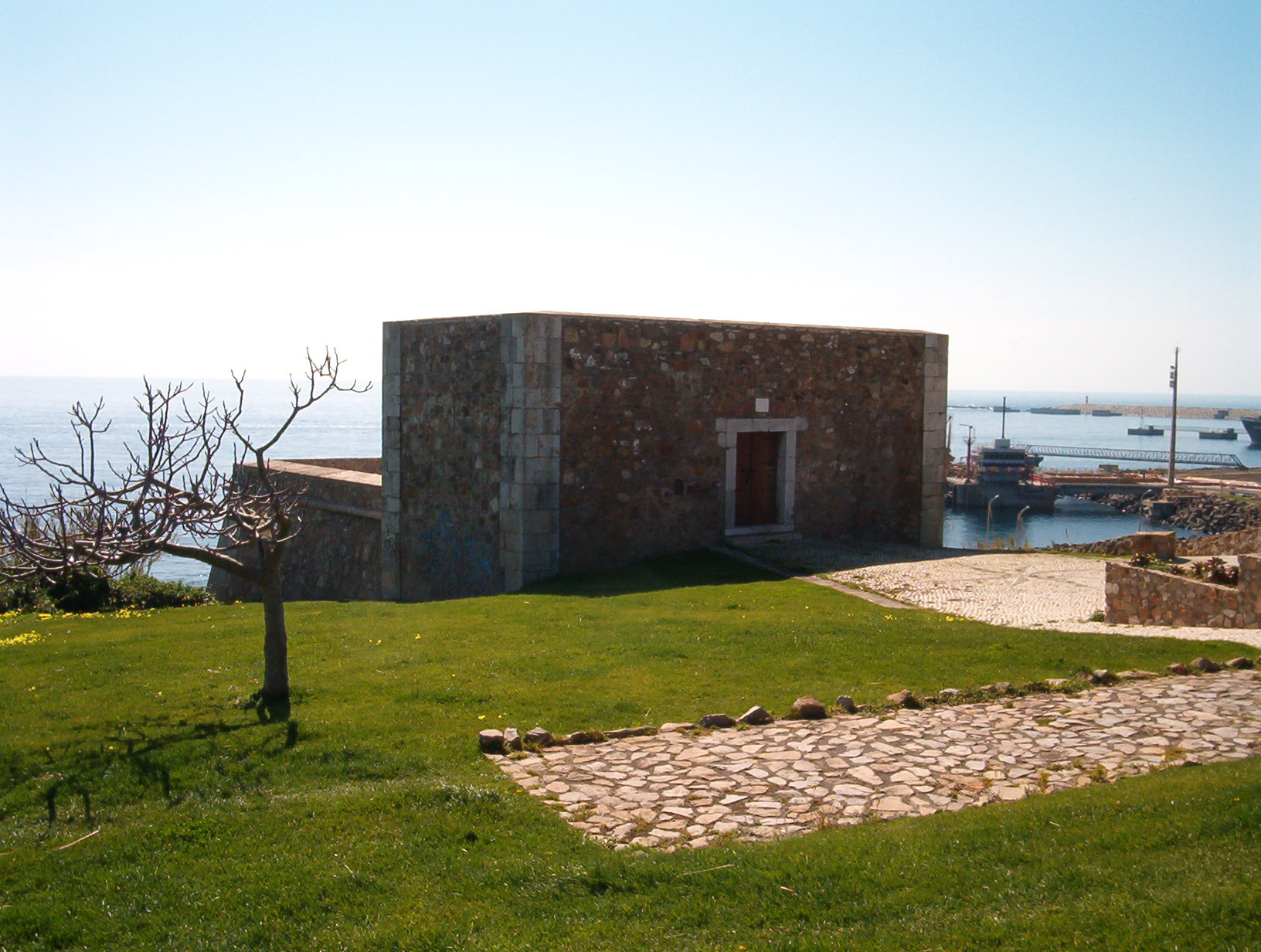
- Landside of the fort.

Site information
- Type: Bastion fort
- Open to the public: Yes.
- Condition: Good.

Location
- Coordinates: 37°57′5″N 8°52′36″W

Site history
- Built: 17th century.

Fort Nossa Senhora das Salvas (Forte de Nossa Senhora das Salvas in Portuguese) popularly known locally as Forte do Revelim (literally, "Ravelin Fort") is located in the parish of Sines, district of Setúbal, in Alentejo, Portugal.

Located on the Cape of Sines, at the western end of the bay, its purpose was to serve as a costal lookout and to cooperate with the Sines Castle in the defense of the town against the attacks of privateers and pirates once frequent along the coast. Upon sighting a hostile vessel and the garrison warning residents, the residents took refuge in the castle and its fort. It took its name from the nearby Nossa Senhora das Salvas Church, named after the patron-saint of the local fishermen.

It was built following the design of architect João Rodrigues Mouro, in the 17th century, after the Restoration of Portuguese Independence, at which time other fortresses with the same function were built along the Portuguese coast.

The garrison was at strategic points of defense alongside the cannons. It was garrisoned until 1844.

It is classified as a Property of Public Interest by Decree nº 95, of 12 September 1978. It was recently included in a Portuguese government program that sought to lease historical properties for cultural or tourism purposes. The fort can be used for private or public events.

== Features ==
It has a coastal fort, in Mannerist style, and a rectangular plan, with pillbox and battery. Currently, the parapet that surrounds the battery and the pillbox terrace no longer display the original gun emplacements.

== Gallery ==
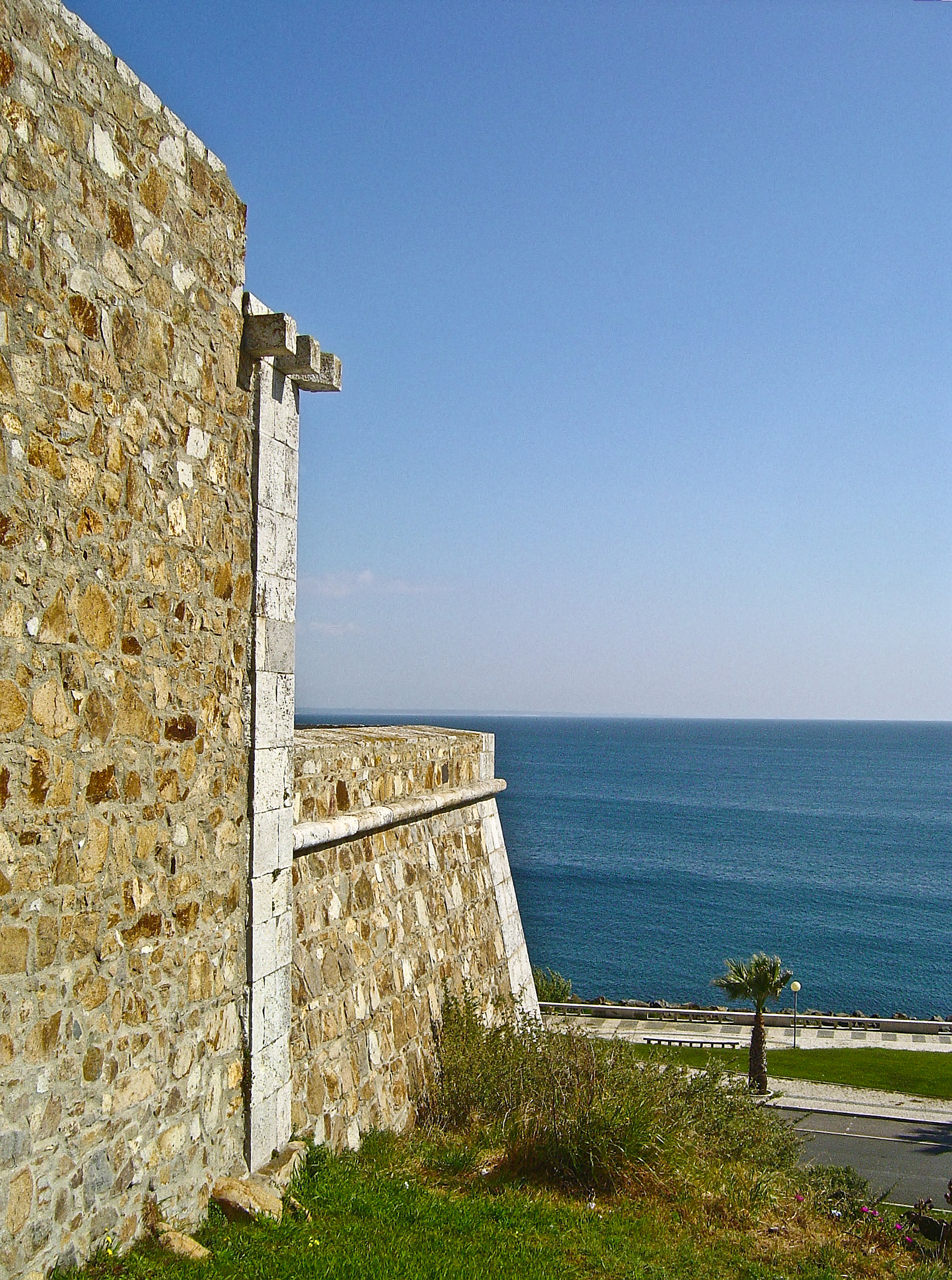
West side wall.

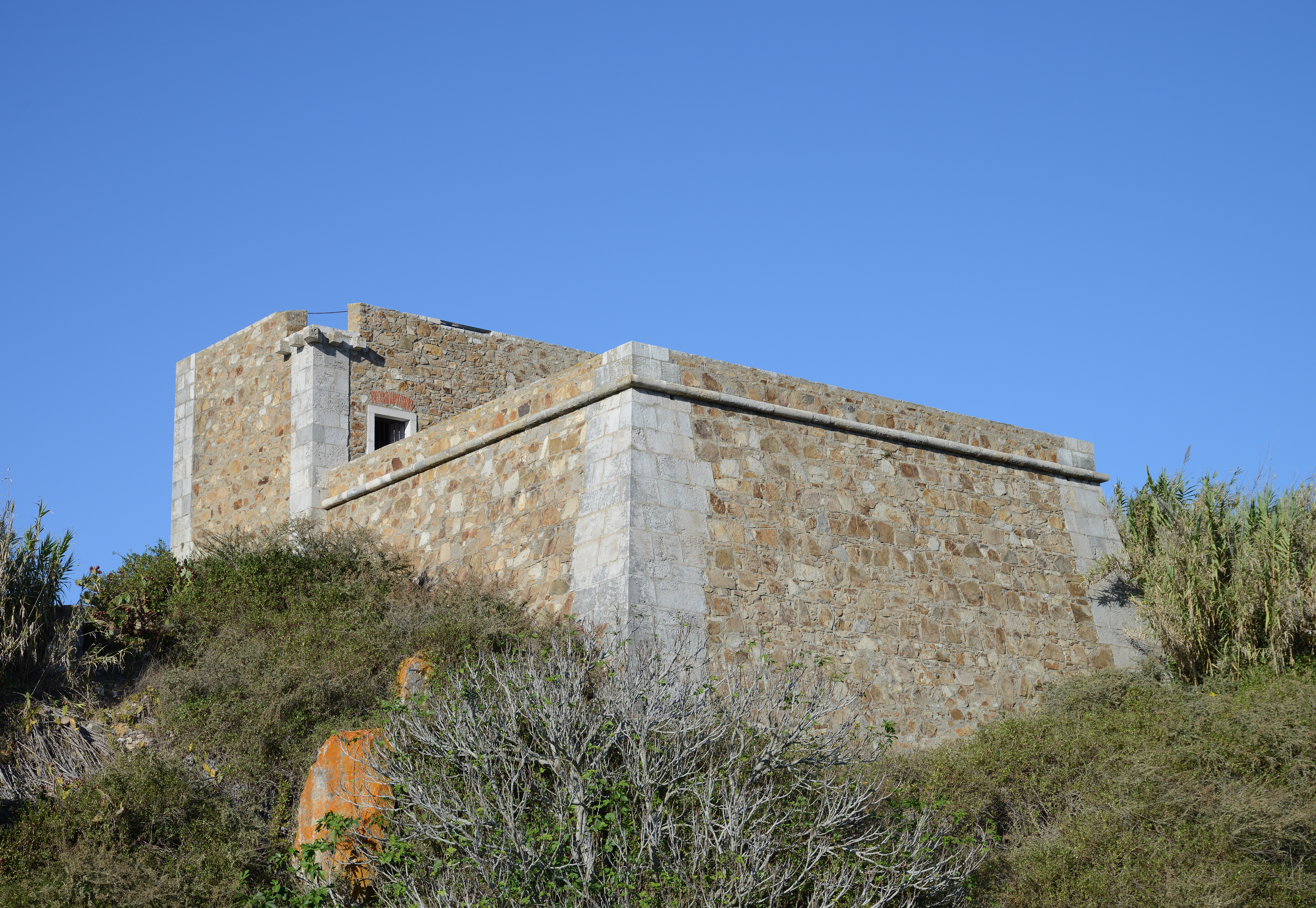
The fort as seen from the coast.
