= Christian Radich =

Norwegian full-rigged ship

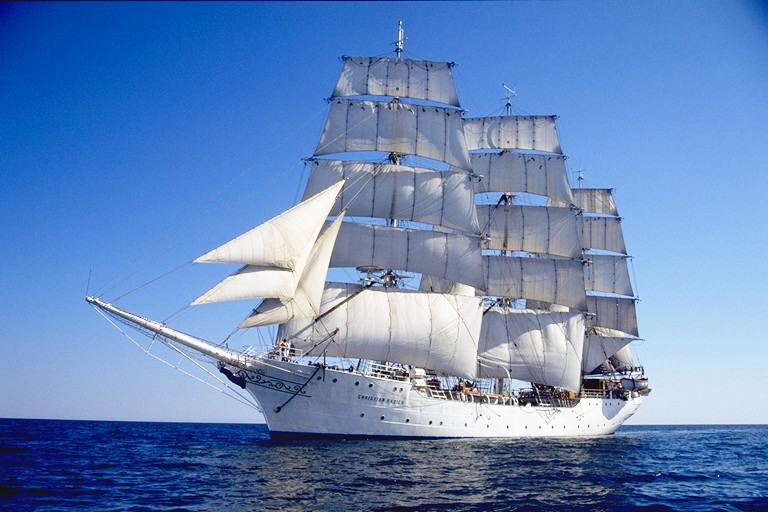
- Christian Radich under sail

History

Norway
- Name: Christian Radich
- Builder: Framnæs Mekaniske Værksted
- Launched: February 1937
- Home port: Oslo
- Identification: IMO number: 5071729; callsign: LJLM; MMSI number: 258373000
- Status: in active service, as of 2022

General characteristics
- Class & type: Full-rigged ship
- Tonnage: 663 GT, 198 NT
- Displacement: 1,050 tonnes (1,030 long tons)
- Length: 62.5 m (205 ft) 73 m (240 ft) including bowsprit
- Beam: 9.7 m (32 ft)
- Height: 37.7 m (124 ft)
- Draught: 4.7 m (15 ft)
- Propulsion: 27 Sails, 1,360 m^{2} (14,600 sq ft) Engine, Caterpillar 900 HK
- Speed: Sails, 14 knots (26 km/h) Engine, 10 knots (19 km/h)
- Complement: 18 permanent crew 88 passengers

Christian Radich is a Norwegian full-rigged ship, named after a Norwegian shipowner. The vessel was built at Framnæs shipyard in Sandefjord, Norway, and was delivered on 17 June 1937. The owner was The Christian Radich Sail Training Foundation, which was established by a grant from an officer of that name.

== Description ==
Christian Radich is a full-rigged, three-masted, steel hulled ship, 62.5 metres (205 ft) long, with an overall length of 73 metres (240 ft), including the bowsprit and a beam of 9.7 metres (32 ft). She has a draught of approximately 4.7 metres (15 ft), and a displacement at full load of 1,050 tonnes (1,030 long tons; 1,160 short tons).

Her top speed under sail is 14 knots (16 mph; 26 km/h), and 10 knots (12 mph; 19 km/h) under power. The vessel is maintained by a crew of 18, and can accommodate 88 passengers.

The class society of the vessel is Det Norske Veritas, DNV, and is built to +1A1, E0.

Masts and sails:

Mizzen mast (9 sails): Mizzen Royal, Mizzen Topgallant, Mizzen Upper Topsail, Mizzen Lower Topsail, Crossjack (Bergine), Mizzen Royal Staysail, Mizzen Topgallant Staysail, Mizzen Topmast Staysail, Spanker

Main mast (8 sails): Main Royal, Main Topgallant, Main Upper Topsail, Main Lower Topsail, Main Course, Main Royal Staysail, Main Topgallant Staysail, Main Topmast Staysail

Fore mast and bowsprit (10 sails): Fore Royal, Fore Topgallant, Fore Upper Topsail, Fore Lower Topsail, Fore Course, Fore Royal Staysail, Fore Topmast Staysail, Flying Jib, Outer Jib, Inner Jib

Total: 27 sails

== History ==
The tall ship Christian Radich is well known through the international release of the 1958 Cinemiracle movie Windjammer. Christian Radich sailed to the United States in 1976 as part of the Bicentennial Celebration, and partook in the Operation Sail parade in New York Harbor on 4 July 1976. The ship also appeared in the 1970s BBC TV series The Onedin Line, as one of James Onedin's ships.

The vessel was initially built to train sailors in the Norwegian merchant navy, and did so for many years. Since 1999, the ship has been on the charter market as well as sailing with paying trainees to foreign ports on summer trips, participating in the Cutty Sark Tall Ships Race, Operation Sail events, and large sail events in European ports. In 1980, the vessel won the OpSail 80 race from Boston, USA to Kristiansand, Norway, taking 17 days to do so. It was the first time a tall ship had beaten the racing yachts in both uncorrected and corrected time.

Christian Radich won the first race of the Tall Ships Race 2010 in Class A, from Antwerp to Skagen in Denmark, a distance of 787 km (489 mi) just under two days with an average speed of 10.2 knots (11.7 mph; 18.9 km/h), with the corrected time of 1 day, 4 hours, 29 minutes, and 44 seconds, and won the overall race 2010, making this the ship's fifth victory in the Tall Ships Race.

== Tall Ships' Races results ==
Christian Radich has participated in the Tall Ships' Races since the inaugural race in 1956. The ship has won numerous individual races and several overall series titles, including the Cape Horn Trophy.

The following table lists selected top results in the Tall Ships' Races and related international tall ship regattas. Results up to 2011 are documented in Christian Radich Nytt, issue 1/2012.

Year	From	To	Class A	Overall	Notes
2025	(Norway) Kristiansand	(Denmark) Esbjerg	1st	1st	
2025	(United Kingdom) Aberdeen	(Norway) Kristiansand	2nd	–	
2025	(France) Dunkerque	(United Kingdom) Aberdeen	5th	–	
2025	(France) Le Havre	(France) Dunkerque	3rd	–	
2023	(United Kingdom) Lerwick	(Norway) Arendal	1st	–	Race Three Endurance, Class A
2019	(Norway) Bergen	(Denmark) Aarhus	3rd	9th	
2017	(United Kingdom) Greenwich	(Portugal) Sines	2nd	–	Rendez-Vous 2017 Tall Ships Regatta
2016	(United Kingdom) Blyth	(Sweden) Gothenburg	2nd	–	North Sea Tall Ships Regatta
2016	(Portugal) Lisbon	(Spain) Cádiz	2nd	–	
2014	(Norway) Bergen	(Denmark) Esbjerg	2nd	4th	
2014	(Netherlands) Harlingen	(Norway) Fredrikstad	3rd	–	
2011	(United Kingdom) Lerwick	(Norway) Stavanger	3rd	–	
2011	(Republic of Ireland) Waterford	(United Kingdom) Greenock	1st	1st	
2010	(Belgium) Antwerp	(United Kingdom) Hartlepool	1st	–	Series winner – Cape Horn Trophy
2010	(Norway) Kristiansand	(United Kingdom) Hartlepool	2nd	5th	
2010	(Belgium) Antwerp	(Denmark) Aalborg	1st	1st	
2009	(Poland) Gdynia	(Lithuania) Klaipėda	1st	–	Series winner – Cape Horn Trophy
2009	(Finland) Turku	(Lithuania) Klaipėda	1st	5th	
2009	(Poland) Gdynia	(Russia) Saint Petersburg	1st	1st	
2008	(United Kingdom) Liverpool	(Netherlands) Den Helder	1st	–	Series winner – Cape Horn Trophy
2008	(Norway) Bergen	(Netherlands) Den Helder	1st	1st	
2008	(United Kingdom) Liverpool	(Norway) Måløy	1st	3rd	
2007	(Denmark) Aarhus	(Poland) Szczecin	1st	–	Series winner – Class A Race Series Trophy
2007	(Sweden) Stockholm	(Poland) Szczecin	1st	1st	
2007	(Denmark) Aarhus	(Finland) Kotka	2nd	–	
2006	(Spain) A Coruña	(Belgium) Antwerp	2nd	–	
2006	(France) Saint-Malo	(Portugal) Lisbon	1st	1st	
2005	(Republic of Ireland) Waterford	(Norway) Fredrikstad	1st	–	Series winner – Cape Horn Trophy
2005	(United Kingdom) Newcastle upon Tyne	(Norway) Fredrikstad	1st	1st	
2005	(Republic of Ireland) Waterford	(France) Cherbourg	1st	1st	
2004	(Norway) Stavanger	(Germany) Cuxhaven	3rd	4th	
1999	(France) Saint-Malo	(Denmark) Aalborg	1st	–	Series winner – Cape Horn Trophy
1999	(United Kingdom) Lerwick	(Denmark) Aalborg	1st	5th	
1999	(France) Saint-Malo	(United Kingdom) Greenock	2nd	3rd	
1997	(United Kingdom) Aberdeen	(Norway) Trondheim	2nd	2nd	
1992	(Spain) Cádiz	Puerto Rico	1st	–	Columbus Regatta
1980	(United States) Boston	(Norway) Kristiansand	1st	1st	
1978	(Sweden) Gothenburg	(Norway) Oslo	2nd	–	
1976	(United Kingdom) Plymouth	(United States) Newport	2nd	–	Series result
1976	Bermuda	(United States) Newport	3rd	–	
1976	(Spain) Tenerife	Bermuda	3rd	7th	
1976	(United Kingdom) Plymouth	(Spain) Tenerife	3rd	3rd	
1972	(Finland) Helsinki	(Sweden) Falsterbo	1st	2nd	
1970	(United Kingdom) Plymouth	(Spain) Tenerife	1st	6th	
1966	(United Kingdom) Falmouth	(Denmark) Skagen	2nd	–	
1964	(Portugal) Lisbon	Bermuda	1st	–	
1958	(France) Brest	(Spain) Las Palmas de Gran Canaria	2nd	–	
1956	(United Kingdom) Torbay	(Portugal) Lisbon	2nd	–	Would have ranked 1st under the current class system

Gold, silver and bronze backgrounds indicate first, second and third place, respectively. "Overall" refers to the ranking across all participating classes. Series results are identified separately and represent combined results from multiple races.

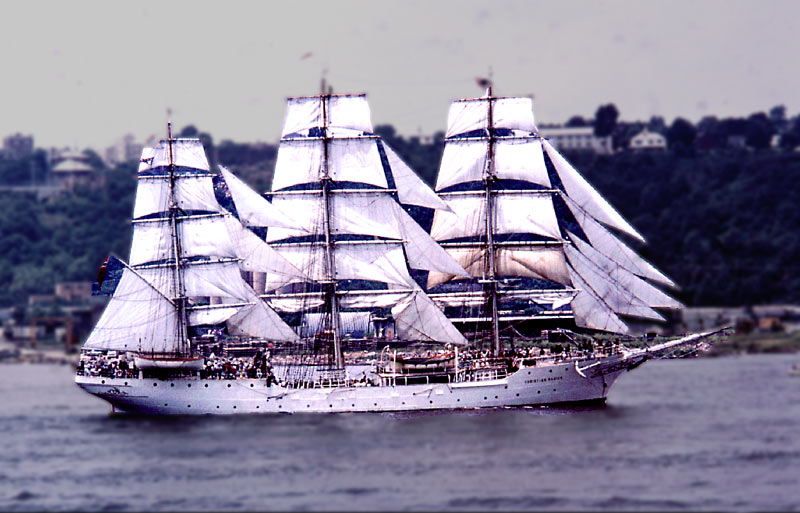
Christian Radich at Operation Sail on 4 July 1976
