= Colosseum kino =

Cinema in Oslo, Norway

Coordinates: 59°55′46.36″N 10°42′39.18″E

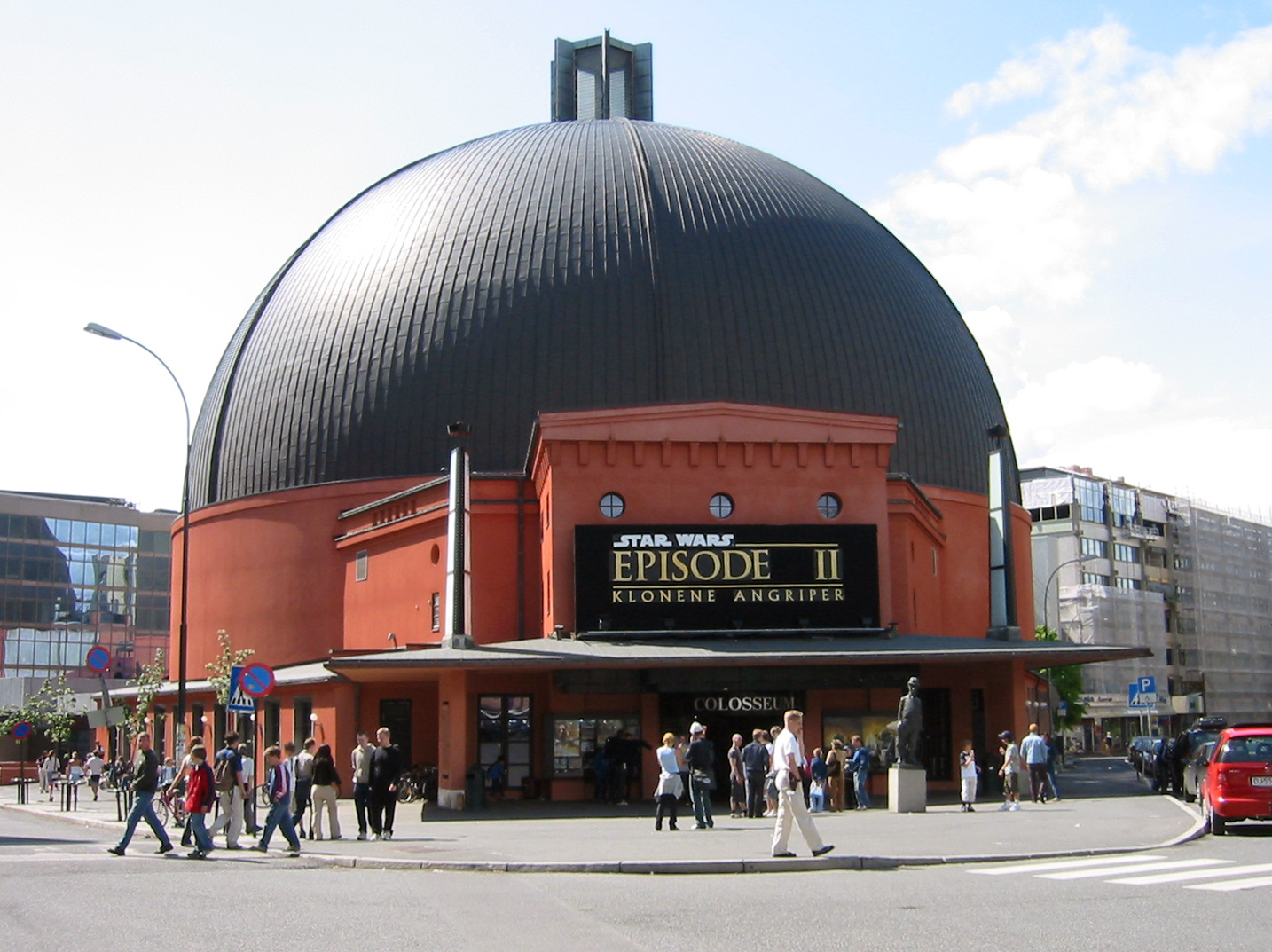
Colosseum Kino

The Colosseum Kino in Oslo, Norway is the largest cinema in Northern Europe and the largest THX cinema in the world. It is distinguished by its large spherical dome.

== Timeline ==
- December 20, 1921: the Kino was established as a public company. The largest stockholder was D. F. Olsen, who also was responsible for the building's construction. With 2100 seats, the Kino was Scandinavia's largest cinema.
- July 1, 1929: The Norwegian government bought the Kino, which posed strong competition to existing government-owned cinemas.
- 1935: Colosseum showed the movie Becker Sharp, the first color film shown in Norway.
- July 1, 1948: the Kino was transferred into the ownership of Oslo Kinematografer.
- 1954: Colosseum is the first Norwegian cinema to install the CinemaScope format. The first movie to be shown in this format is Men jeg så ham dø (The Robe).
- 1958: the three-projector Cinemiracle system was installed. The first movie screened on this system at the Kino was Windjammer.
- 1960: 70mm was installed. The new decade was celebrated with a newly refurbished entrance hall, and the movie South Pacific was screened in 70mm. Until now Colosseum had approximately 1250 seats.
- February 15, 1963: a major fire shut down the Kino temporarily. Restoration work began immediately under the supervision of architect Sverre Fehn. After another minor fire on the roof and a work accident, the theatre reopened.
- September 12, 1964: Colosseum reopens with 1158 seats, premiering the movie Lawrence of Arabia on a 27.5 x 9.5 meter screen. It was viewed as one of Europe's most beautiful cinemas, with its "dome" measuring a diameter just above 40 meter, which is the same size as the dome in the famous St. Peter's Basilica.
- 1980: new chairs were installed in the dome.
- August 5, 1987: the Kino reopens as a "Cinematic Centre", extending the theatre with three new halls (for a total of four).
- 1988: a new copper roof was installed by Kattomestarit Oy from Hämeenlinna, Finland.
- April 15, 1998: Colosseum closed for total interior and exterior refurbishing. The works also included installation of the speakers and systems for the THX Certified sound system, to ensure the best sound for the movie experience.
- December 1998: the Kino was officially THX Certified, making it the largest THX certified Cinema in the world.
- November 2007: the Newman ticketing solution was installed, making the Kino the first Norwegian Cinema to have a browser based cinema ticketing solution.
- December 2009: Colosseum 1 has been upgraded with a new Alcons Audio CinemArray sound system. This system incorporates Line Array and Pro Ribbon HF technology.

Colosseum has hosted several premiere parties and long-running movies, notably My Fair Lady and The Sound of Music. In the 1966-1967 period, more than a half-million people (more than the total population of Oslo at that time) saw The Sound of Music in the Colosseum.

== Notes and references ==
- Filmweb.no "Colosseum historikk" (Norwegian), Filmweb.no / Oslokino.no. Accessed May 25, 2007.
- Filmweb.no "Verdens største THX-kino" (Norwegian), Filmweb.no / Oslokino.no. Accessed May 25, 2007.
- Dagbladet.no "Dette gigantanlegget skal lage ny godlyd i Colosseum kino" (Norwegian) Dagbladet.no Accessed Jan 5, 2010.
