= Cláudia de Campos =

Portuguese feminist and writer

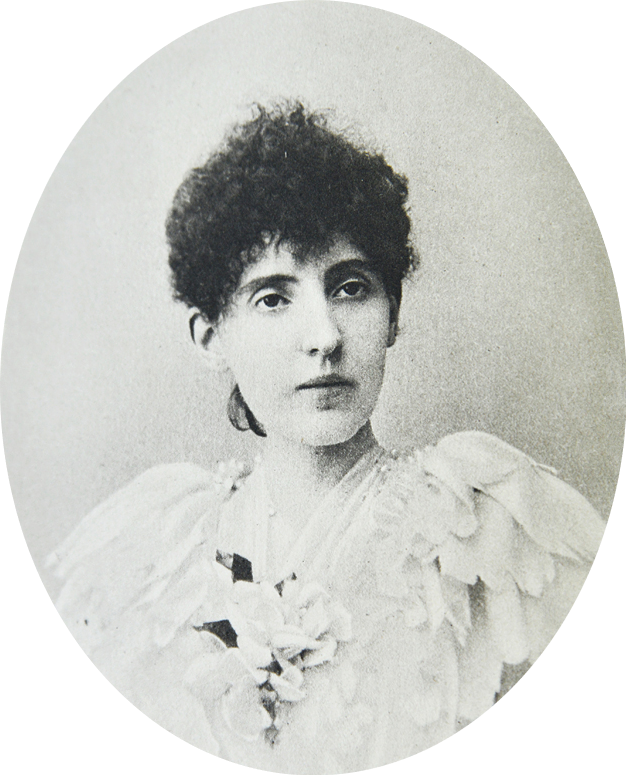
- A portrait of Cláudia de Campos in her 1894 book Último Amor.
- Born: Maria Cláudia de Campos; January 28, 1859 Sines, Portugal
- Died: December 30, 1916 (aged 57) Lisbon, Portugal
- Occupation: Writer, activist
- Notable works: Elle (1899)

Maria Cláudia de Campos (January 28, 1859 – December 30, 1916), also known as Maria Cláudia de Campos Matos, was a Portuguese feminist and writer, best known for her 1899 novel Elle. She was on the Board of Directors of the Portuguese League for Peace's Feminist Sector and a member of the Portuguese Committee of the Women's League for Peace and Disarmament.

== Biography ==
Cláudia de Campos was born in 1859 in Sines, Portugal, the daughter of Francisco António de Campos and Maria Augusta da Palma. Her grandfather, Jacinto da Palma, was health chief for the Port of Sines.

An educated woman, de Campos was fluent in French. She specialized in English studies at Mrs. Kutle's School and wrote a manuscript about Percy Shelley, while also studying German literature.

In 1875, at age 16, she married the 19-year-old Joaquim d'Ornelas e Matos. They settled in Lisbon and had two children before legally separating in 1888, after 13 years of marriage.

After gaining her independence, she began a career as a writer, contributing to various publications including A Leitura from 1894 to 1896 and A Sociedade do Futuro from 1902 to 1904. She sometimes wrote under the pen names Colette/Colete and Carmen Silva.

Her first book, the short story collection Rindo, appeared in 1892. She is best known for her 1899 novel Elle, which is set in her hometown of Sines. The book drew controversy due to its autofictional nature, depicting real people and situations from de Campos' youth in Sines with only their names changed.

De Campos also became a feminist and pacifist activist. In the first decade of the 1900s, she served on the Board of Directors of the Portuguese League for Peace's Feminist Sector and joined the Portuguese Committee of the Women's League for Peace and Disarmament, a French organization. Her feminist views are expressed in her 1895 essay collection Mulheres. Ensaios de psicologia feminina, which examined such figures as Charlotte Brontë, Madame de la Fayette, and Germaine de Staël. She has been described as one of "the first ambassadors of Portuguese feminism."

She died in Lisbon in 1916. Nearly a century after the publication of her 1899 novel Elle, it was reprinted in Sines in 1997.

== Selected works ==
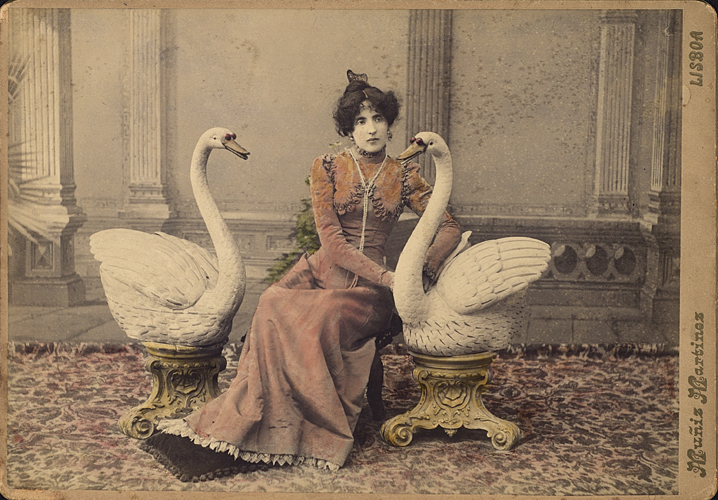
A postcard portrait of Cláudia de Campos around the 1890s.

- Rindo: contos (1892)
- Último amor (1894)
- Mulheres. Ensaios de psicologia feminina (1895)
- Elle: com o retracto da auctora (1899)
- A baroneza Stael e o duque de Palmella (1901)
- Elle (2nd ed., 1997)

== Bibliography ==
- Castro, Zília Osório de and António Ferreira e Sousa (eds.) Dicionário no Feminino (séculos XIX-XX). Lisbon, Livros Horizonte, 2005, pp. 220-221
