= Christian Radich (businessman) =

Norwegian merchant (1822–1889)

- Born: Christian Simeon Wilhelm Radich; 15 August 1822; Fredrikshald (now Halden), Norway
- Died: 29 June 1889 (aged 66)
- Occupations: Merchant, shipowner

Christian Radich (15 August 1822 – 29 June 1889) was a Norwegian merchant whose business interests lay in the timber trade and shipping. He also held the military rank of cavalry captain.

Radich spent most of his life in Christiania (Oslo) but was born in Fredrikshald (now Halden). He was a co-owner of the timber firm Thurmann & Radich in Oslo, which had strong interests in the timber and sawmill business in eastern Norway.

Radich was deeply involved in Norwegian shipping and is best known for the school ship Christian Radich, built after his death. He took a large part in establishing the "Commité for Indkjøb af Skib for Gutter bestemt til Sømænd" in 1877, a committee that helped Norwegian boys of modest means become sailors and that was the beginning of the Christian Radich foundation. In 1884, five years before his death, Radich decided to donate 90,000 kroner toward the building of a new school ship. It took some time before the ship was ready; the work went to Framnæs Mek. Værksted in Sandefjord, and the ship was completed in 1937.
