= Windjammer (1958 film) =

1958 widescreen film

- Directed by: Bill Colleran; Louis De Rochemont III
- Written by: James L. Shute
- Produced by: Louis de Rochemont
- Narrated by: Erik Bye
- Cinematography: Joseph C. Brun; Gayne Rescher
- Edited by: Peter Ratkevich
- Music by: Morton Gould
- Production company: Cinemiracle Productions
- Distributed by: National Theatres
- Release dates: April 7, 1958 (Oslo); April 8, 1958 (Los Angeles)
- Running time: 142 minutes
- Country: United States
- Language: English

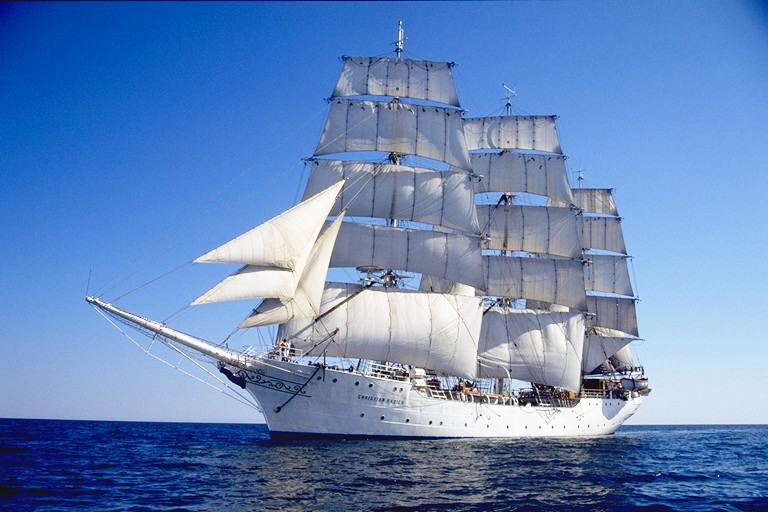
The Christian Radich, the ship featured in the film.

Windjammer is a 1958 documentary film that recorded a 17,500-nautical-mile (32,400 km) voyage of the Norwegian sail training ship Christian Radich. Windjammer was produced by Louis de Rochemont and directed by Louis de Rochemont III. It was the only film to be shot in the widescreen Cinemiracle process, which came with a seven-track stereophonic soundtrack.

== Filming ==
The Christian Radich and its Norwegian crew were filmed while sailing from Oslo, via the island of Madeira, across the Atlantic to the Caribbean, to New York City, Portsmouth, New Hampshire, and then back home to Bergen in Norway.

The film features a score by Morton Gould, with additional musical performances by cellist Pablo Casals and Arthur Fiedler conducting the Boston Pops Orchestra.

A musical highlight through the film is the Piano Concerto of Edvard Grieg, which accompanies the voyage narrative about one of the sea-cadets who is a piano-student preparing to play the concerto in Boston.

The film also features a meeting with the German ship Pamir, which sank in a hurricane in September 1957.

== Presentation ==
The world premiere was on April 7, 1958, at the Colosseum kino in Oslo, Norway, attended by King Olav V and the Norwegian royal family. Its US premiere was on April 8, 1958, at Grauman's Chinese Theatre, Hollywood, where the movie ran for 36 weeks. The US East Coast premiere took place at New York's Roxy Theatre on April 9 where it was shown for 22 weeks on a special curved screen 100 by 40 feet (12 m) in size. The film was also exhibited at specially equipped cinemas in America, Canada, and Europe. Later it was shown in wide release in Cinerama theaters worldwide. It was particularly popular in the Scandinavian nations and in its 29-week run in Oslo had more paid admissions (401,320) than the city's population at the time (375,000).

The film begins in non-widescreen format (1.33: 1 aspect ratio) as the crew prepares for the voyage. When the ship finally sets out (about fifteen minutes into the picture), the screen expands to Cinemiracle dimensions, virtually the same as those of Cinerama.

== Cast ==
- Niels Arntsen, First officer
- Erik Bye, Narrator
- Pablo Casals, Himself
- Arthur Fiedler, Himself
- Gunnulv Hauge, Doctor
- Nils Hermansen, Chief engineer
- Yngvar Kjelstrup, Captain
- Sven Erik Libaek, Cadet #35
- Harald Tusberg, Cadet #32

== See also ==
- List of American films of 1958
- Windjammer

== Bibliography ==
- Villiers, Alan (1958). The Story of Louis de Rochemont's Windjammer: a modern adventure in Cinemiracle. New York: Random House.
