= Sines Tecnopolo =

Science park in Sines, Portugal

The Sines Tecnopolo is a Portuguese science park headquartered in Sines. It is linked with two public universities (Universidade do Algarve and Universidade de Évora), two public polytechnics (Instituto Politécnico de Beja and Instituto Politécnico de Setúbal) and the Sines Municipality.

The park is devoted to technological transfer, entrepreneurship promotion and advanced training oriented to industry needs. Acting as a science park, its location (southwest coast of Portugal) privileges its strategic position: ocean economy and energy technology.
