= Sines Lighthouse =

Lighthouse at Sines, Portugal

Sines Lighthouse Farol de Sines
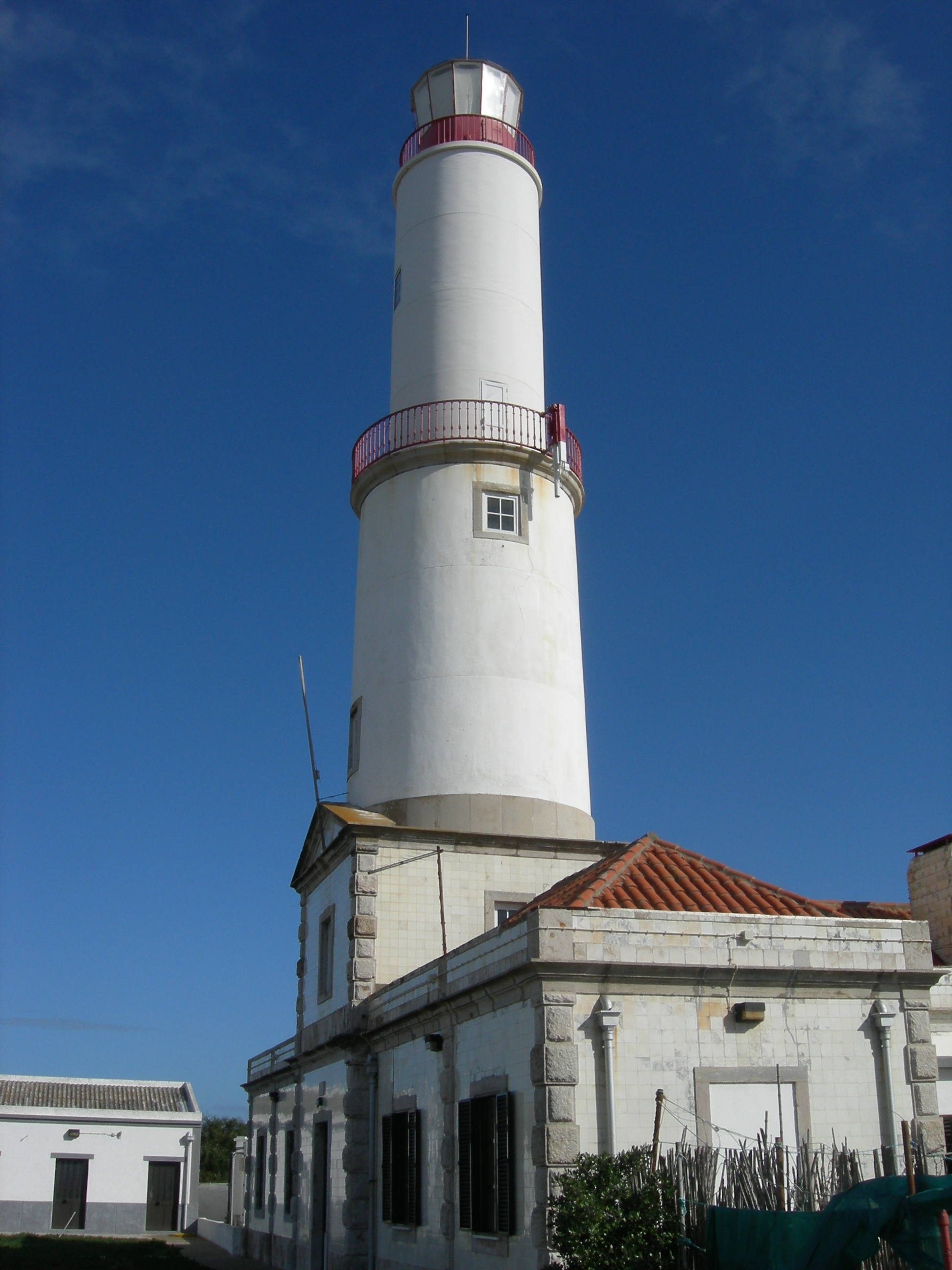
- Location: Sines, Setúbal District, Portugal
- Coordinates: 37°57′35″N 8°52′49″W

Tower
- Constructed: April 1880
- Construction: stone
- Automated: 1995
- Height: 28 metres (92 ft)
- Shape: circular
- Heritage: heritage without legal protection

Light
- First lit: 1880
- Focal height: 56 metres (184 ft)
- Lens: Fourth-order Fresnel
- Light source: Electricity
- Intensity: 1000 watt
- Range: 26 nautical miles
- Characteristic: FI (2) 15s
- Portugal no.: 401

The Sines Lighthouse (Farol de Sines) is located at Cabo de Sines, in Sines, in the Setúbal District of Portugal. It is a 22-metre high white cylindrical tower with a red beacon.

A detailed plan for additional lighthouses along the Portuguese coast was first developed in 1866 by Francisco Maria Pereira da Silva, Inspector General of Lighthouses and a lighthouse at Sines featured in this plan. The plan was approved in 1870 but construction of the Sines lighthouse was not finally completed until April 1880. The lighthouse consisted of two adjoining buildings and a cylindrical tower; 22 metres high. It was initially equipped with a second-order optical device, with lighting fuelled by oil vapour. In 1915 this was replaced by a rotating third-order Fresnel device with a 500mm focal length, which increased the range to 30 nautical miles and enabled the fixed light to be replaced by a flashing one. In the same year a new lighthouse, also one of those identified by Pereira da Silva, was constructed at Cabo Sardão, about 45 kilometers to the south.

In 1948 an accompanying annex building was constructed to facilitate installation of a radio beacon. In the same year a generator was installed, and the light source was changed to electric lamps. Two years later, the lighthouse was connected to the public network. At this time, with the installation of aeromaritime panels, it also became an aerial lighthouse, for navigation by planes. A radio beacon was installed in 1953 but deactivated in the 1990s.

In 1992 work started to increase the height of the tower and a temporary light was installed on scaffolding. The lantern, optical device and other items were removed and are now in the Santa Marta Lighthouse Museum in Cascais. The lighthouse recommenced operations in 1995, using a fourth-order Fresnel device and a 1000-Watt lamp, which guarantees a range of 26 nautical miles, together with a rotating engine. The cylindrical tower at Sines is now constructed in two parts, with different diameters. There is an iron balcony at the top, which surrounds the light, which is now 28 metres high, with an altitude of 56 metres.

== Visits ==
The lighthouse can be visited on Wednesdays between 14.00 and 17.00.

== See also ==
- List of lighthouses in Portugal
- Directorate of Lighthouses, Portugal
