= Cinemiracle =

Widescreen cinema format

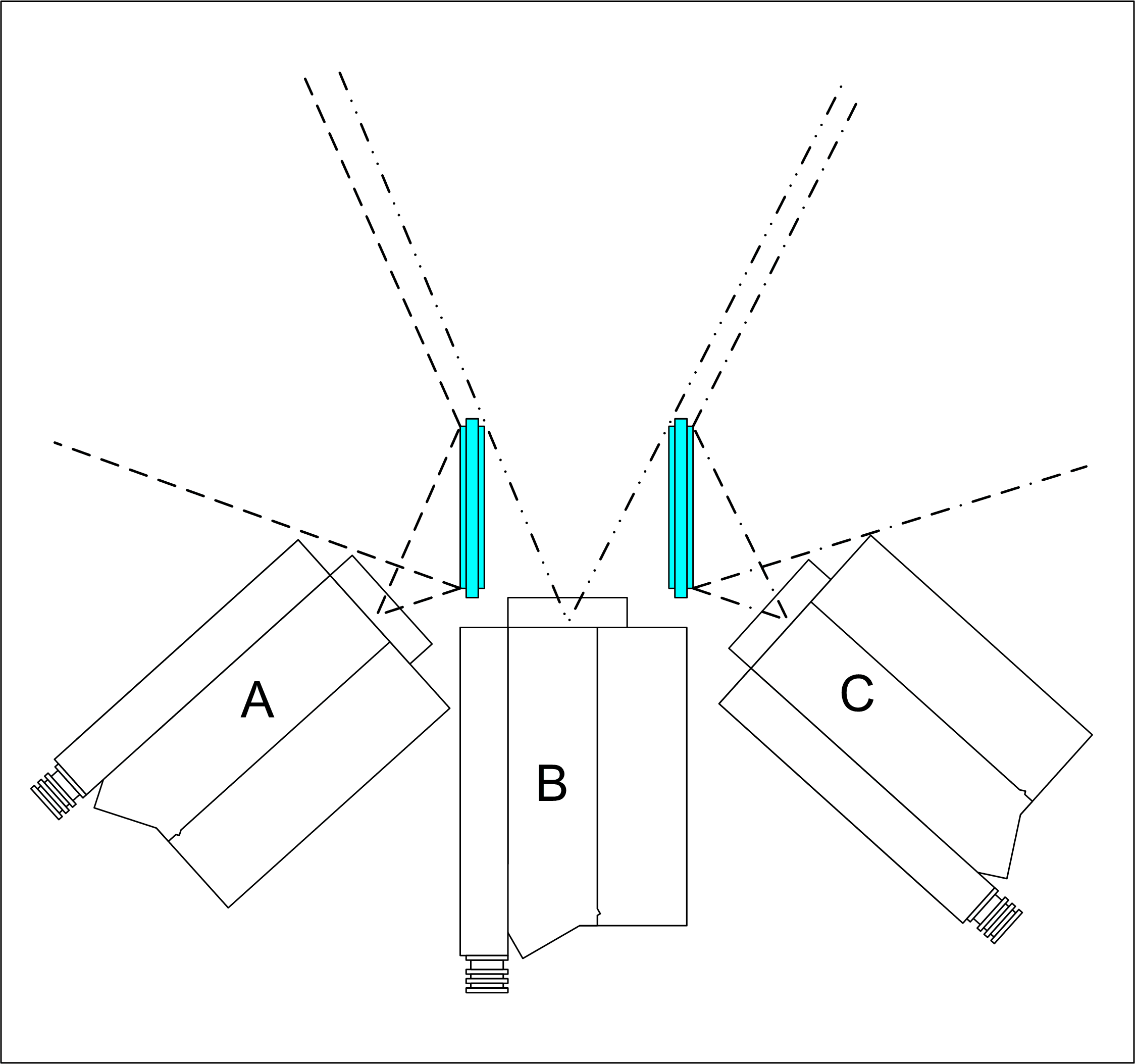
The Cinemiracle camera system using two mirrors.

Cinemiracle was a widescreen cinema format competing with Cinerama developed in the 1950s. It was ultimately unsuccessful, with only a single film produced and released in the format. Like Cinerama it used 3 cameras to capture a 2.59:1 image. Cinemiracle used two mirrors to give the left and right cameras the same optical center as the middle camera. This made the joins between the projected images much less obvious than with Cinerama.

== Development ==
In the early 1950s, the Smith-Dietrich Corporation patented a two camera process using a single mirror to combine two conventional 1.33:1 aspect ratio images to produce a seamless 2.66:1 aspect ratio image.

National Theatres acquired the rights to the patents and began development of a three camera system using the same system. The resulting camera was bulky at 600 pounds (272 kg)—but had a number of interesting features:

- The right and left cameras shot through mirrors, recording a reversed image — this was corrected by projecting the reversed image through a mirror in the theatre.
- An integrated view finder with a 146 degree field of view, enabling exact compositions.
- The three Eastman Kodak 27 millimeter lenses were electronically controlled—and shifted their optical centers depending on the focus.
- The mirrors had beveled edges, which feathered the edges of the images, eliminating the need for the vibrating comb "gigolos" used in Cinerama.
- The camera intermittents also employed film milled for Dubray-Howell 'long-pitch' sprockets, unlike that of either Cinerama (B-H 'short-pitch' negative perf) or Kinopanorama (K-S 'short-pitch' pos perf).

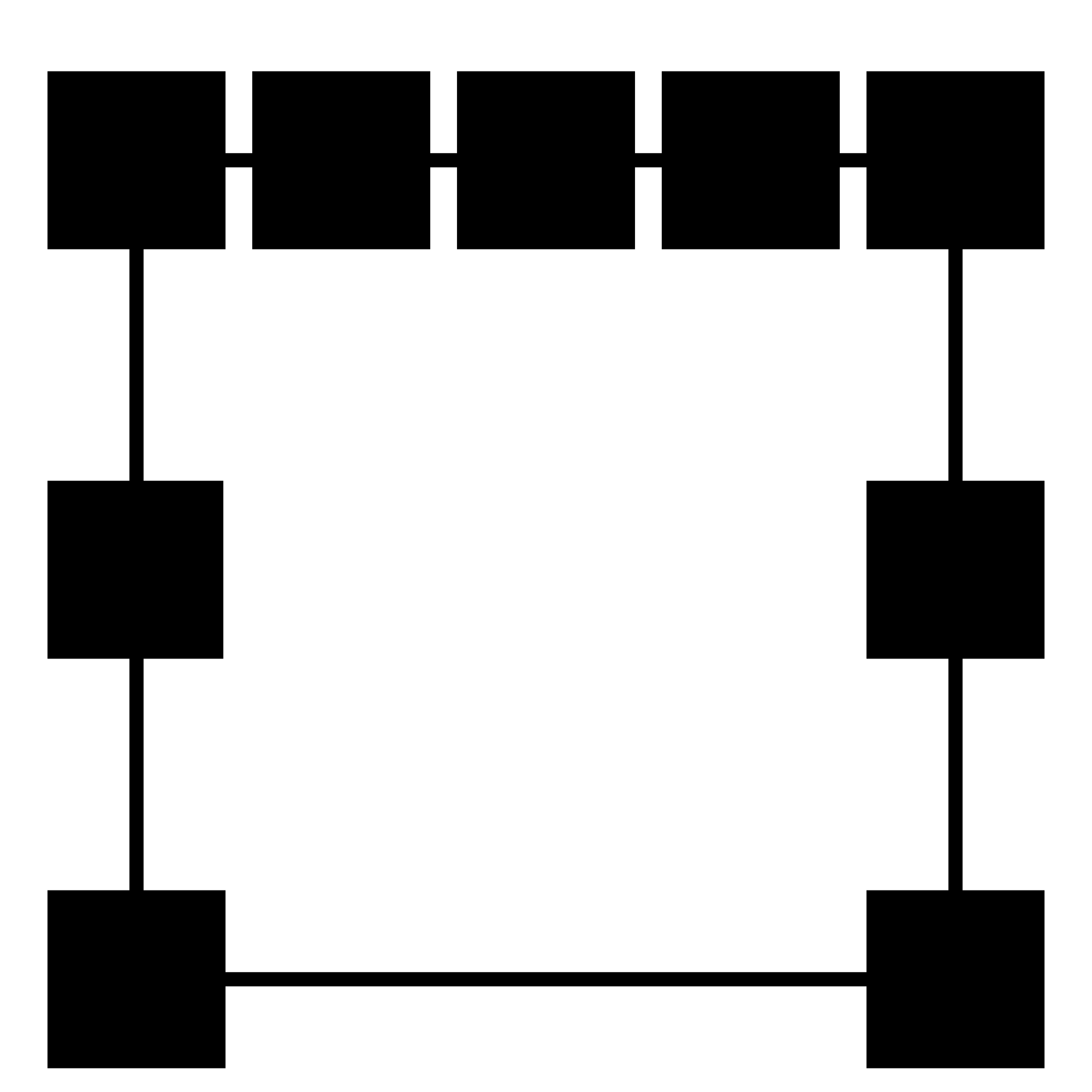
Cinemiracle speaker layout - five front channels and two surround channels that could be steered to the left, right or rear wall of the theatre

The film was shot and projected at 26 frames per second from six perforation 35 millimeter film and sound playback was from a seven track magnetic system with five front channels and two surround channels that could be steered to the left, right or rear wall of the theatre.

The system used a 120-degree curved screen—this is somewhat less than Cineramas 146-degree curve, and was probably because Cinerama held key patents on the design of deeply curved screens. However the smaller curve had the advantage of being cheaper and easier to make and install.

A film was needed to showcase the format, and this came in the shape of the travelogue Windjammer, about the actual voyage of a large sailing windjammer, the Christian Radich. Windjammer was produced by Louis De Rochemont and directed by his son Louis De Rochemont III. They had previously been involved with Cinerama Holiday, a travelogue in the similar Cinerama multi-projector format.

== Premiere ==
The world premiere of both Windjammer and the Cinemiracle system was at Grauman's Chinese Theatre in Hollywood on 8 April 1958. The film ran for 36 weeks. Windjammer was later transferred to the Cinerama format, and even to CinemaScope.

Jack L. Warner of Warner Brothers expressed an interest in the system and agreed to produce a film entitled The Miracle in the Cinemiracle format. However, it was later produced in Technirama instead. The patents for Cinemiracle were bought by Cinerama and effectively brought the format to an end.

== See also ==
- List of film formats
- Windjammer (1958 film)
- Cinerama
