= Capela de Nossa Senhora das Salvas =

Chapel in Sines, Setúbal, Portugal

Coordinates: 37.9527474°N 8.8743537°W

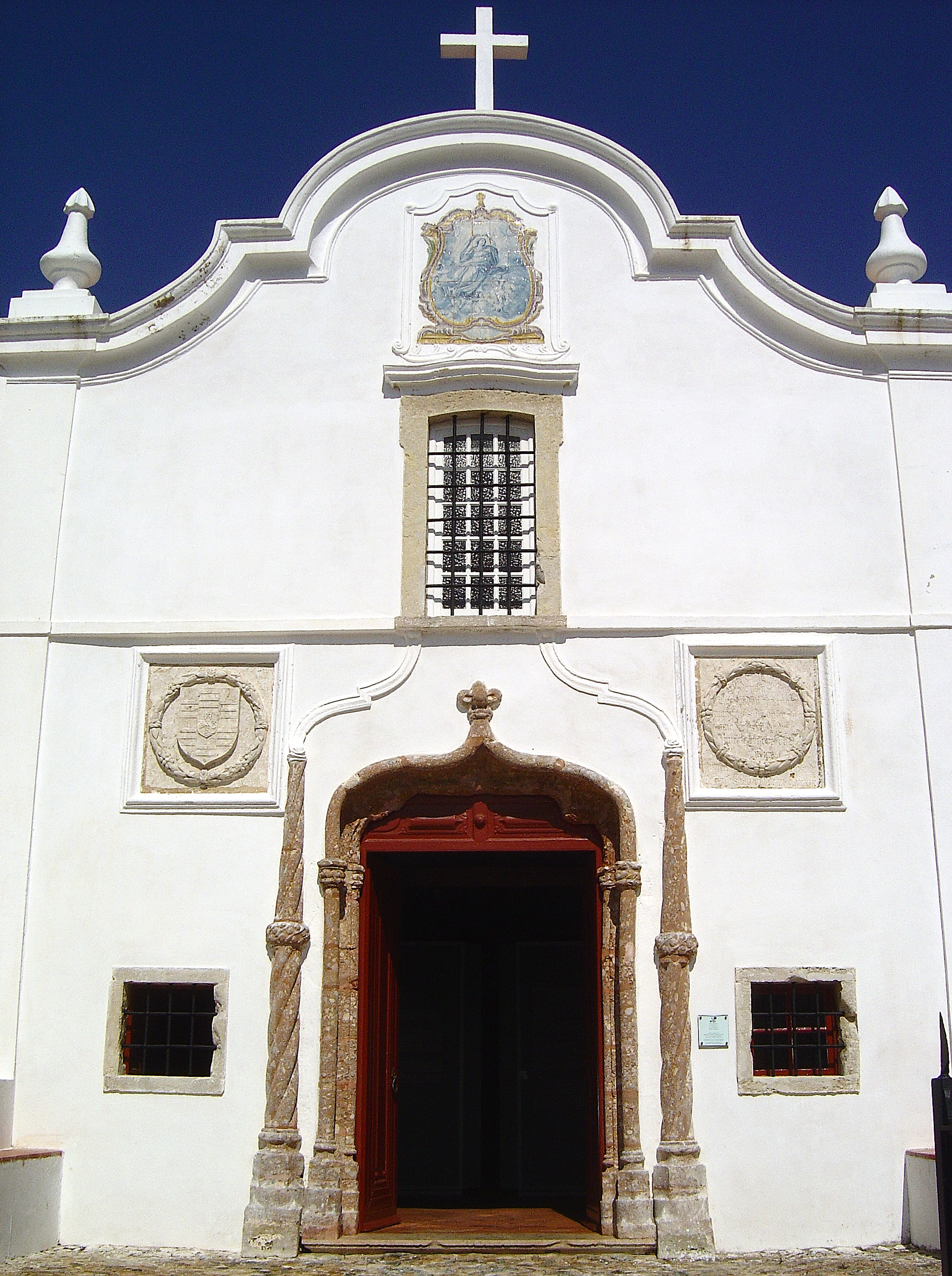
The Chapel of Our Lady of Salas/Salvas

The Capela de Nossa Senhora das Salvas is a chapel in Sines Municipality, Setúbal District, Portugal. It is classified as a national monument.
