= Sines =

- Municipality
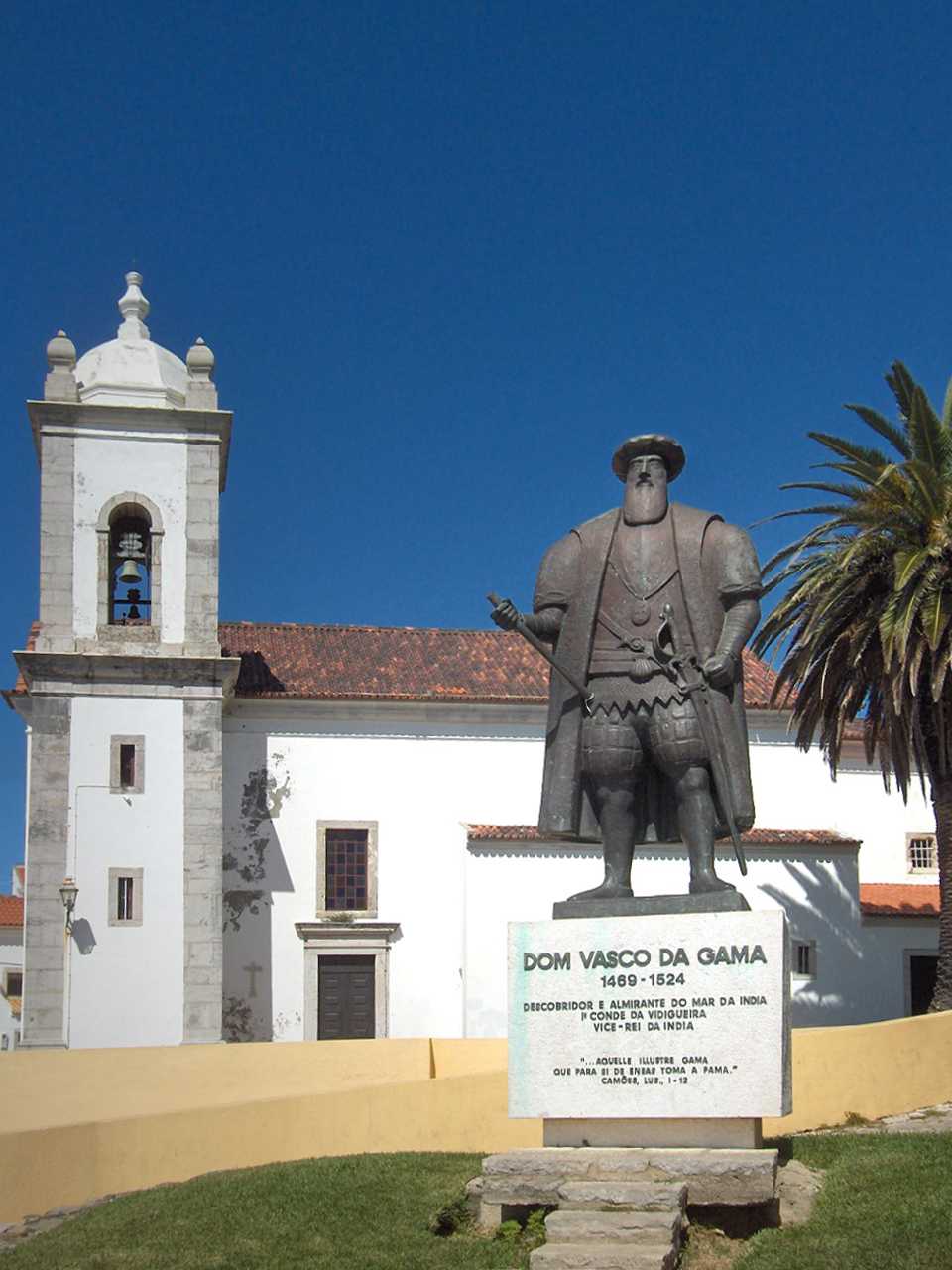
- A monument to Vasco da Gama who was christened in the parish church of Sines, and whose father was the alcade-mor of the castle

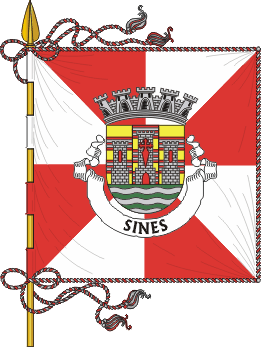
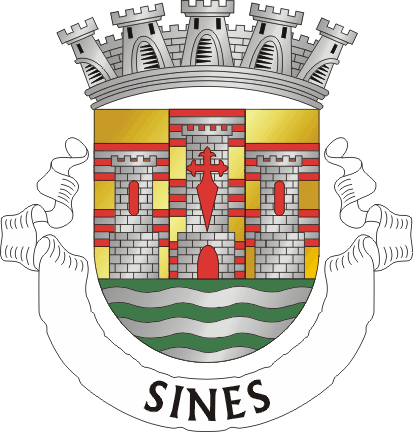
- Flag Coat of arms
- Interactive map of Silves
- Coordinates: 37°57′17″N 8°51′52″W
- Country: Portugal
- Region: Alentejo
- Intermunic. comm.: Alentejo Litoral
- District: Setúbal
- Parishes: 2

Government
  - President: Nuno José Gonçalves Mascarenhas (PS)

Area
  - Total: 203.30 km^{2} (78.49 sq mi)
- Elevation: 49 m (161 ft)

Population (2021)
  - Total: 14,214
  - Density: 69.916/km^{2} (181.08/sq mi)
- Time zone: UTC+00:00 (WET)
  - Summer (DST): UTC+01:00 (WEST)
- Postal code: 7520
- Area code: 269
- Website: http://www.cm-sines.pt/

Sines (Portuguese pronunciation: [ˈsinɨʃ]) is a town and a municipality in Portugal. The municipality, divided into two parishes, has around 14,214 inhabitants (2021) in an area of 203.30 km^{2} (78.49 sq mi). Sines holds an important oil refinery and several petrochemical industries. It is also a popular beach spot and the main fishing harbour of Alentejo region.

The municipality is bordered to the north and east by the municipality of Santiago do Cacém, south by Odemira and west by the Atlantic Ocean. The coastline of the city, south of São Torpes, is part of the Southwest Alentejo and Vicentine Coast Natural Park.

== History ==
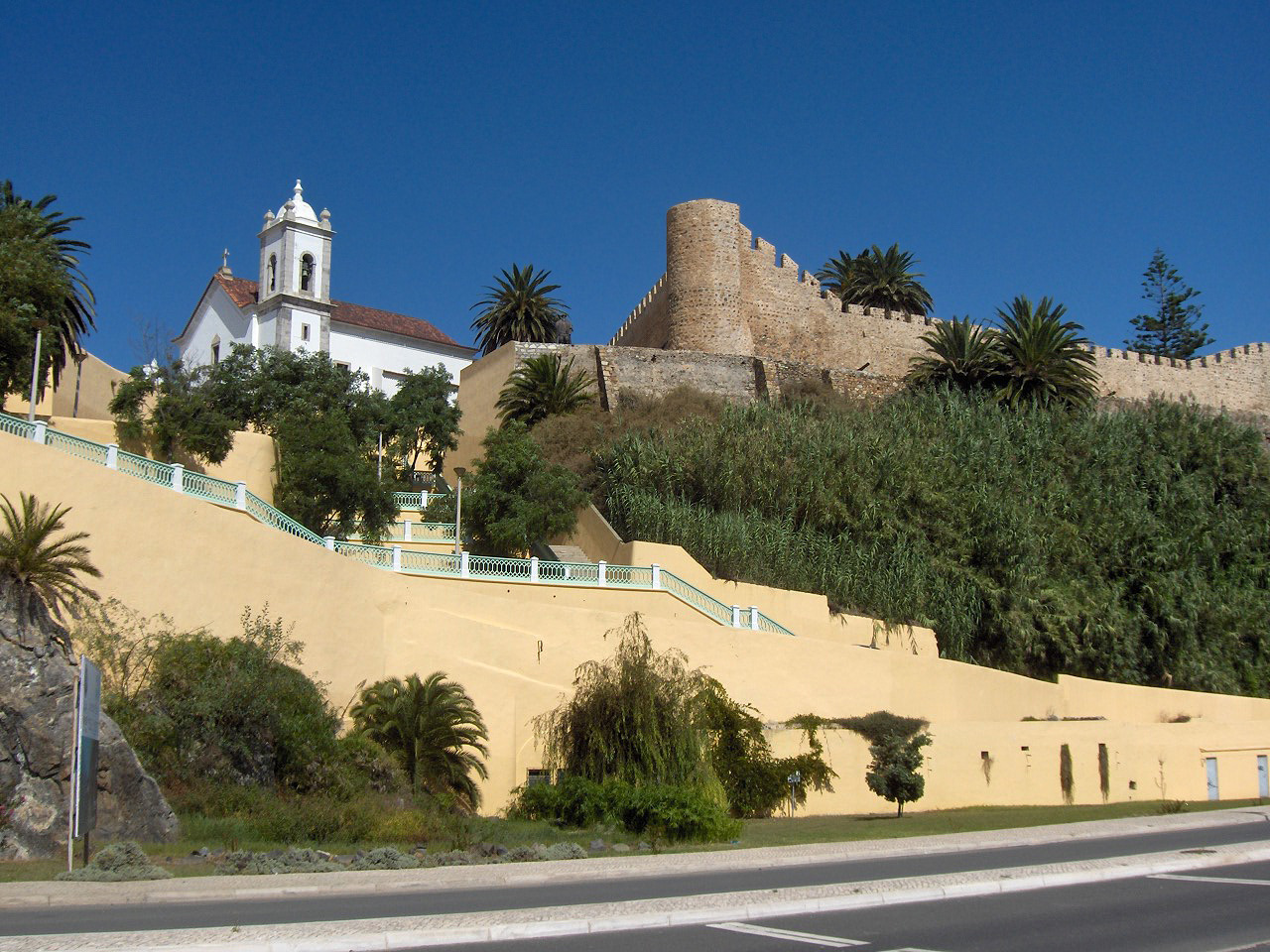
The ancient centre of Sines: the castle was initiated as protection from pirates in 1362

Vestiges of a few settlements have today been discovered in archaeological sites, such as Palmeirinha and Quitéria, that attest to the age of human settlements in Sines. Arnaldo Soledade (1981) noted that these Visigoths, identified as Cinetos, may have been the original civilization that gave rise to the community, suggesting the local toponymy may have derived from this; Cinetos, to Cines and, finally, Sines. Although this tribes lineage is not clearly defined, Soledade goes on to refer to the construction of a castro where the current Castle stands.

The Punics are thought to have also had a presence in the area; a Punic artifact, the Tesouro do Gaio was unearthed in 1966, and is on display in the Museu de Sines (English: Sines Museum). Discovered in May 1966, the 'treasure' was unearthed by a local farmer, Francisco da Silva Campos, who was tilling his land to plant corn, and discovered a schist tomb with women's jewellery in his plot of land in Herdade do Gaio (12.5 km southeast of Sines, 7 km from the coast and 275m from Ribeira de Morgavel).

Between 1966 and 1967, investigator José Miguel da Costa discovered several of these Punic graves, but all showing evidence of early tomb raiding. While the jewellery was determined to be Punic in origin, the symbolism on the artefacts were characterized as Egyptian. On the island of Pessegueiro, there is also evidence of Ibero-Punic artefacts discovered under the Roman port, discovered by archeologists Carlos Tavares da Silva and Joaquina Soares (1981). Roman occupation brought the destruction of many of these artefacts associated with the Iron Age.

The Romans used Sines as a port and industrial centre; the bay of Sines was used as port by the civitas of Miróbriga and the canal on the island of Pessegueiro is linked to Arandis (Garvão). During Rome's occupation, Sines and the island of Pessegueiro, were poles within an industrialized fishing industry which included salting fish. The Roman centres were thought to have been at Praça Tómas Ribeiro, as well as the area around Monte Chaos in Feteira Cima (although little explored archaeologically). In the fields of Quitéria, Carlos Tavares da Silva and Joaquina Soares (1981) investigated the remains of a 1st-century villa, where the remnants of cobblestone streets and a hypocaust were discovered.

In 1961, José Miguel da Costa, during excavations around the Castle of Sines, discovered Roman "fishing factories", and a ceramics kiln to produce amphorae for salted fish, both dating back to the 1st and 2nd centuries. Sine's toponymy is also Roman in origin, but may refer to two terms (both applicable): the term sinus, which means bay; or an alternate meaning for curve, and may refer to the curvature of the Sines Cape, as seen from Monte Chãos.

=== Middle Ages ===
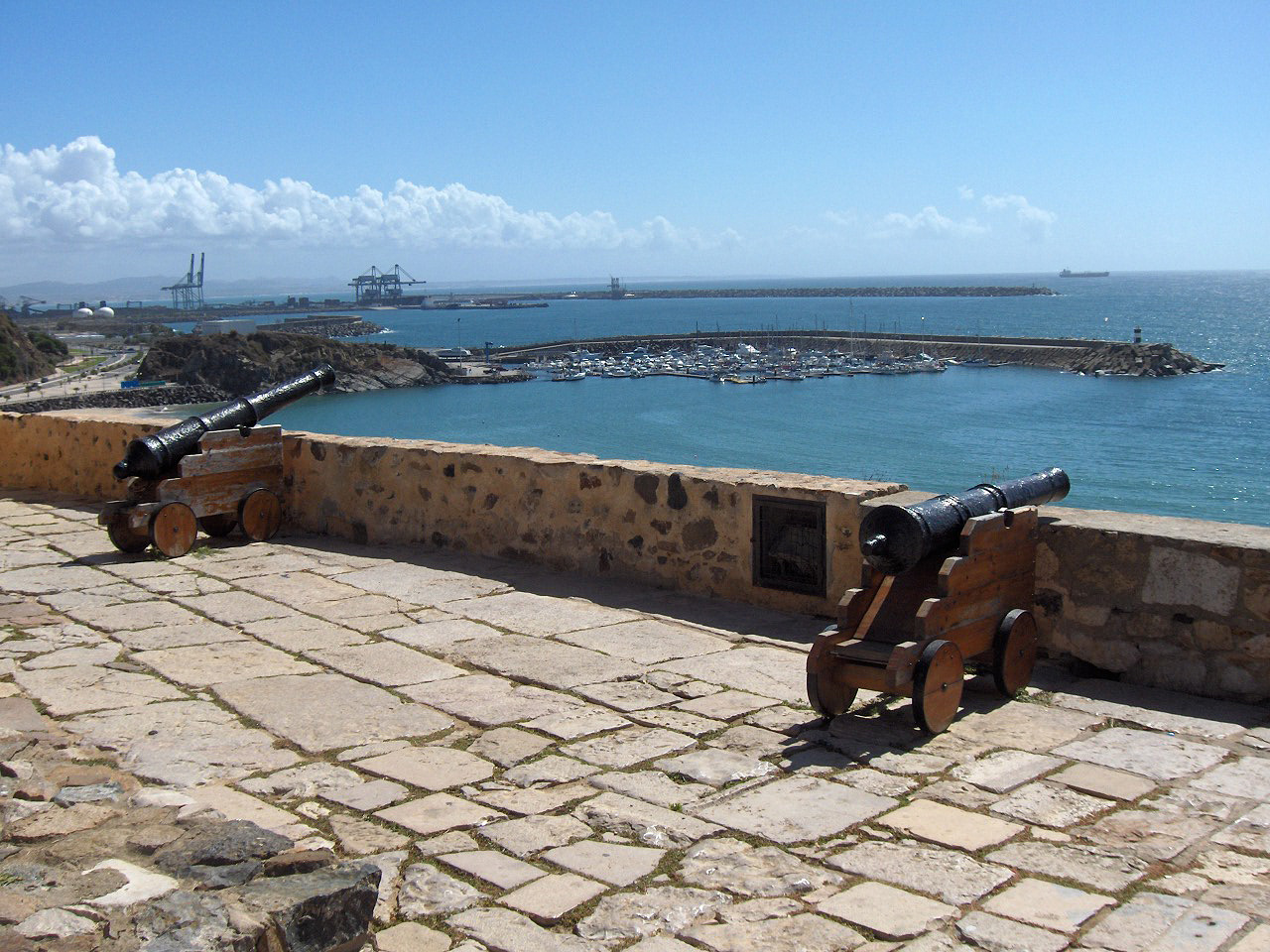
Battlements along the south wall of the Castle of Sines

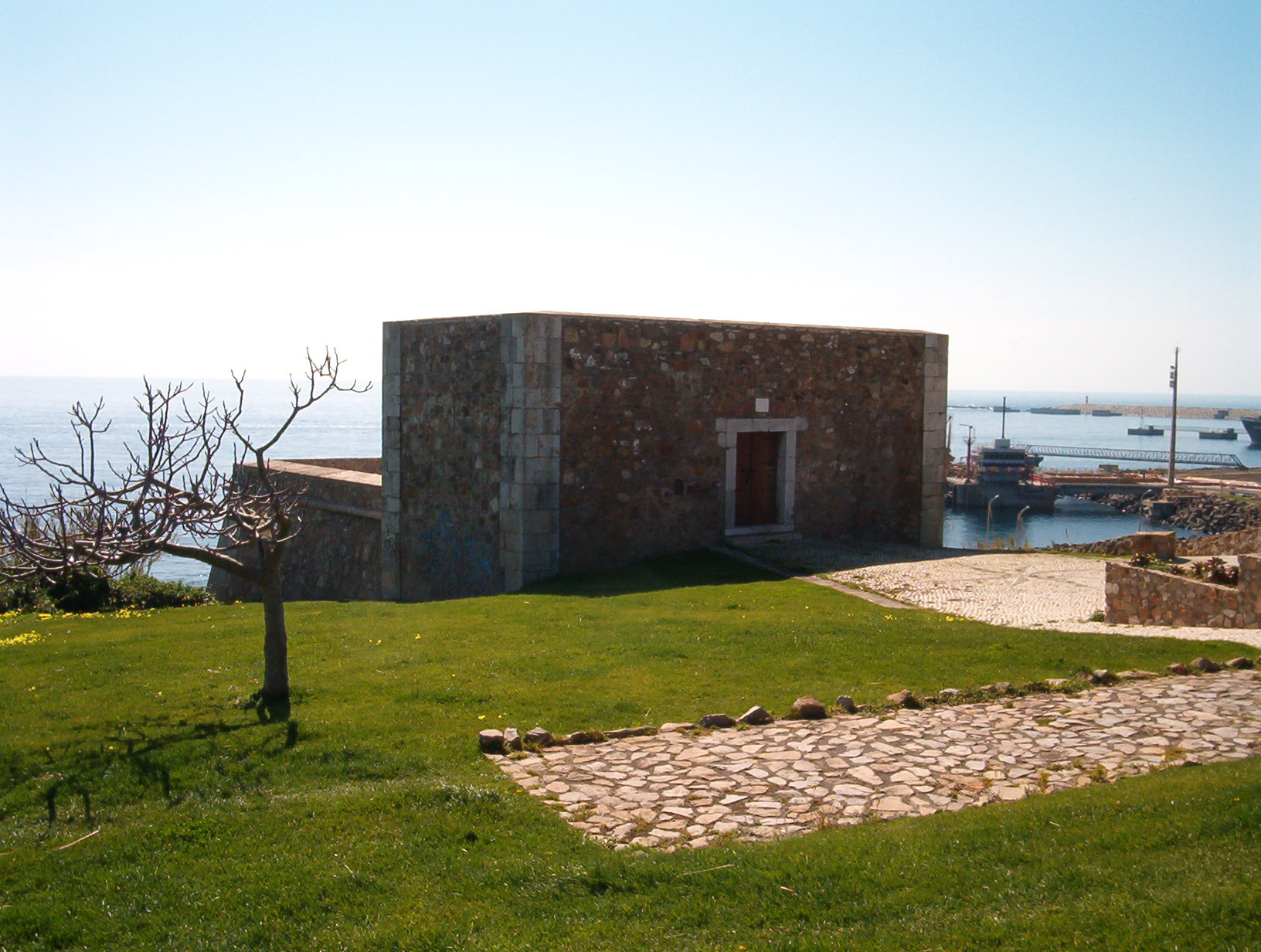
The Revelim Fort, the 17th Century fort used for the protection from pirates

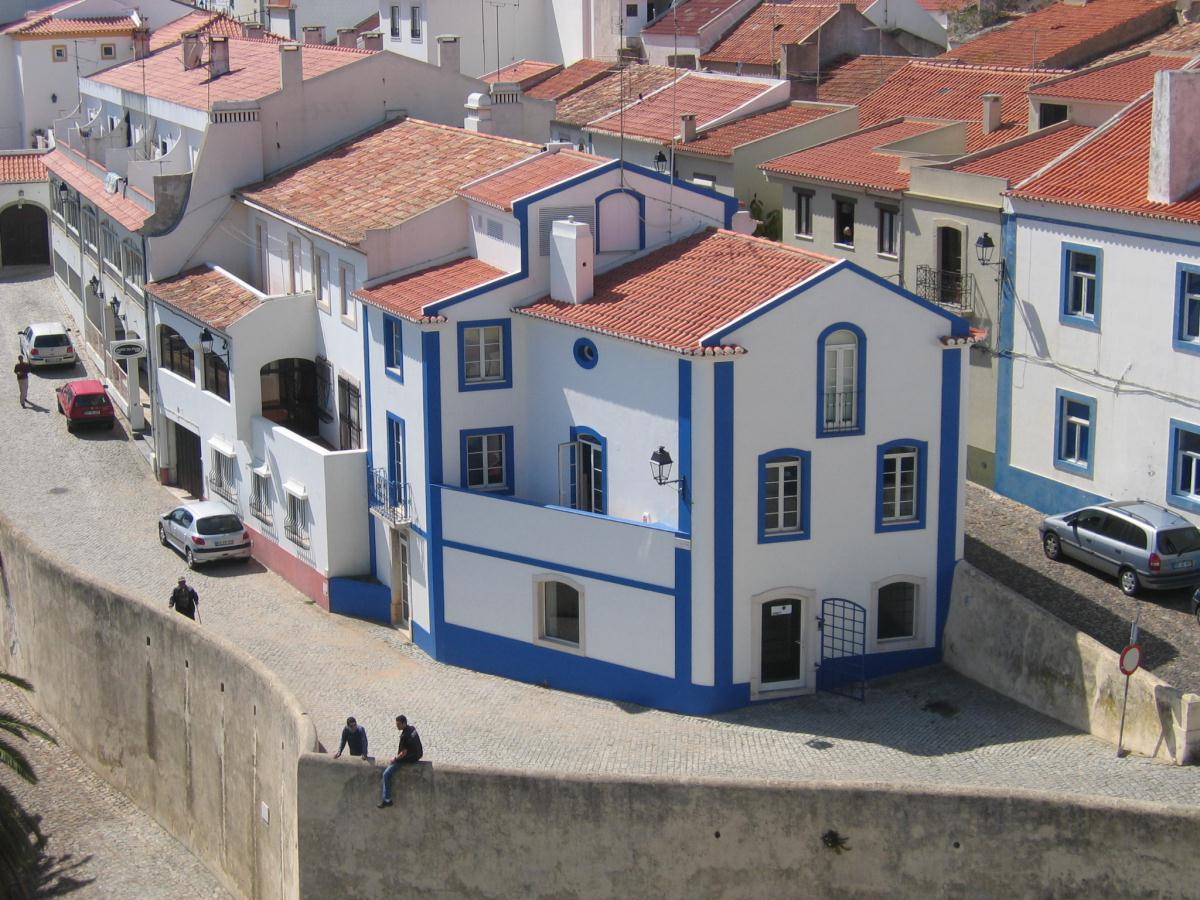
The old quarter of Sines, showing an example of the older architecture

During the Middle Ages, the area of Sines was occupied by the Visigoths and later sacked by Moors. There are many more examples of Visigoth-era carved stones (7th century) throughout Sines. Evidence from an archaeological excavation of the Sines castle discovered that many of the walls of the old building were constructed from the rocks used in the construction of Roman-era monuments, such as a portion of a pedestal of a statue of Mars (which was assumed to have been part of a larger square in the Roman town before the construction of the basilica). The basilica itself likely existed on the site of the current Matriz Church, whose baptistery is of Visigothic origin. The Moors likely sacked the settlement in the 7th century; this marked a period of decline in the area, indicating a period when the ancient settlement was abandoned. Yet, although the few inhabitants lived in the zone, Moorish ships regularly patrolled the waters, until the 13th century, when Afonso III conquered the region.

The area regained much of its importance at the beginning of the 8th century, when fishermen returned to the waters around Sines. Re-settlement along the coast was initiated by the Order of Santiago da Espada, who administered the lands under the reign of Afonso III. Sines obtained administrative autonomy from Santiago do Cacém on 24 November 1362, when Pedro I elevated Sines to the status of villa. He later preoccupied himself with the coastal defense of the region, establishing the conditions for the construction of Sine's Castle, already protected by elements of the Visigothic wall. The castle in Sines was constructed during the first half of the 15th century. Like Setúbal, but contrary to what happened in Santiago do Cacém or Palmela, the castle was constructed to defend the wealth of the local merchants, indicating a new economic and social order, with the ascension of the bourgeoisie.

=== Monarchy ===
During the Portuguese Interregnum and 1383–1385 Crisis, the bourgeoisie and nobles of Sines were one of the municipalities that supported the Master of the Order of Aviz, the later King John I of Portugal in his battle for the throne. In 1395, aggravated by the fact the castle was not completed, King John appropriated men to serve in the military campaigns along the frontier. But, much of the concern during this period was from attacks by pirates, and compulsory military service was seen as bulwark against the region's collapse. In 1511, Sines was attacked by a large band of pirates. The King, who was careful to indemnity the losses, established a small base of three ships in Sines and Sesimbra to combat these French privateers. By the end of the 16th century, as threats from the coast increased, so too were the fortifications along the coast. This included the establishment of a fort alongside the Chapel of Senhora das Salas (Fort of Revelim), and two forts on the island of Pessegueiro. In 1629, as the construction of the Revelim Fort proceeded, Turkish pirates attacked and sank a nau in the port of Sines. A Sesimbrense captain, though, was successful in capturing a pirate ship in the bay by 1648.

At the end of the 16th century, commanded by Filippo Terzi, in the service of Philip II of Portugal, it was thought that the construction of a new port on Pessegueiro would motivate growth. Problems during construction, and frequent raids by English privateers, caused the project to be abandoned: the remnants on Pessegueiro include great blocks of rock that were quarried to make way for the project. In the last decade of the 18th century, the natural anchorage seduced Jacinto Fernandes Bandeira, a merchant, to found Porto Covo, with the hope that his initiative would convince others to establish complementary businesses and a grand port.

In the second half of the 19th century, pyrite from Pias and Moinho dos Paneiros (Sines) and ore from Cercal are transported from the small island. The ore arrived in carts pulled by bulls, transported over a large bridge, and by boats to larger ships on the island. Near the mouth of the ravine on Pessegueiro there still remain abandoned deposits of accumulated ore, that were never transported.

During the first decade of the 19th century, the populace of Sines lived in fear during the French occupation of the country. In one incident, a company of troops from Napoleon's army pillaged the town and defaced the royal coat-of-arms over the doors to the castle.

Under the Liberalist Constitution, the municipality began to govern its own affairs, as the Order of Santiago, along with other religious orders were expelled from Portugal in 1855, and most of their assets appropriated. Sines became a parish of Santiago do Cacém, losing autonomy, yet flourished economically as several new businesses began operating from the town. The establishment of cork and canning industries, small factories producing distillates and artisan goods (bakeries and cobblers), turned the village more attractive to emigrants. The town attracted many English and Catalan businesses, as well as Alentejan and Algarvan entrepreneurs in search of work.

Entrepreneurial growth and republican idealism helped to redevelop the area, as the construction of new roads, the arrival of a rail-line, access to schools and culture became cumulative. The new elites, not only built their wealth on land rental, but also industry and commerce, and showed renewed interest in restoring the municipality. These liberal elites, such as João Daniel de Sines, fought for the constitutional monarchy during the Liberal Wars, and were magnanimous when former-King Miguel of Portugal stopped-over in their region on his way to exile.

At the end of the 19th century, a young Algarvian medic would write the first monograph on Sines, Breve Notícia de Sines (English: A Brief Notice on Sines). Francisco Luís Lopes' work was an acidic critique of municipal affairs and living conditions that were both sincere and damning, but also flattering and praise-worthy, noting both the villa's problems and its openness and tolerance.

=== Republic ===
The year 1914 marked a period of renewed interest and the restoration of the municipality. The cork industry, the fishery, some agriculture and tourism marked a period of economic activity that lasted until the end of the 1960s, when, apart from its proximity to the sea, Sines was indistinguishable from other communities in the Alentejo. Sines was the beach for many of the local residents of the Alentejo, visited by the rural families of Beja and Santiago do Cacém.

Until the early 1970s, Sines was a sheltered fishing village with a long commercial history of relations with cities in the Mediterranean; its large marina, along a breakwater, is the only marina between Setúbal and the Algarve, while the deep-sea port, commercial fishery and industrial depot have driven the economy of this area. In 1970, the government of Marcello Caetano initiated the grand industrial-port complex that would, along with the 1974 Revolution, energize the local economy. Consequently, the population exploded, while industry and commerce diversified, causing their own impacts. In the late 1970s, the arrival of immigrants and refugees from the Portuguese overseas provinces brought new social dynamics, which were later supplemented by foreign workers employed in the port and petrochemical industry.

== Geography ==
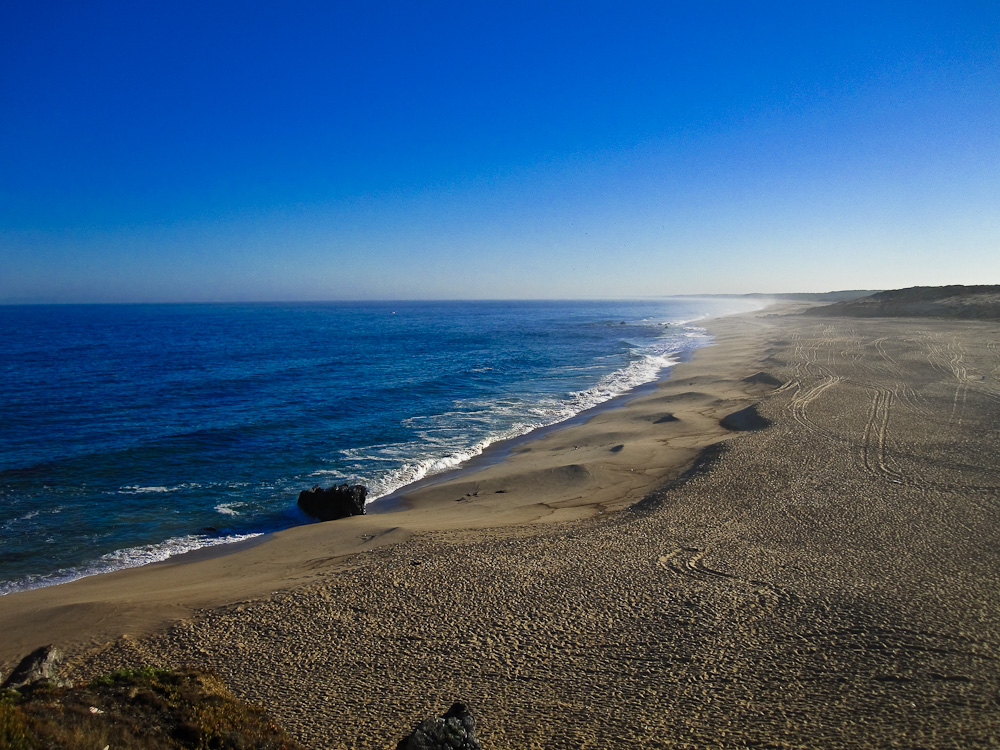
Praia da Costa Norte is the starting point of the longest uninterrupted beach in Europe, stretching from Sines to Setúbal

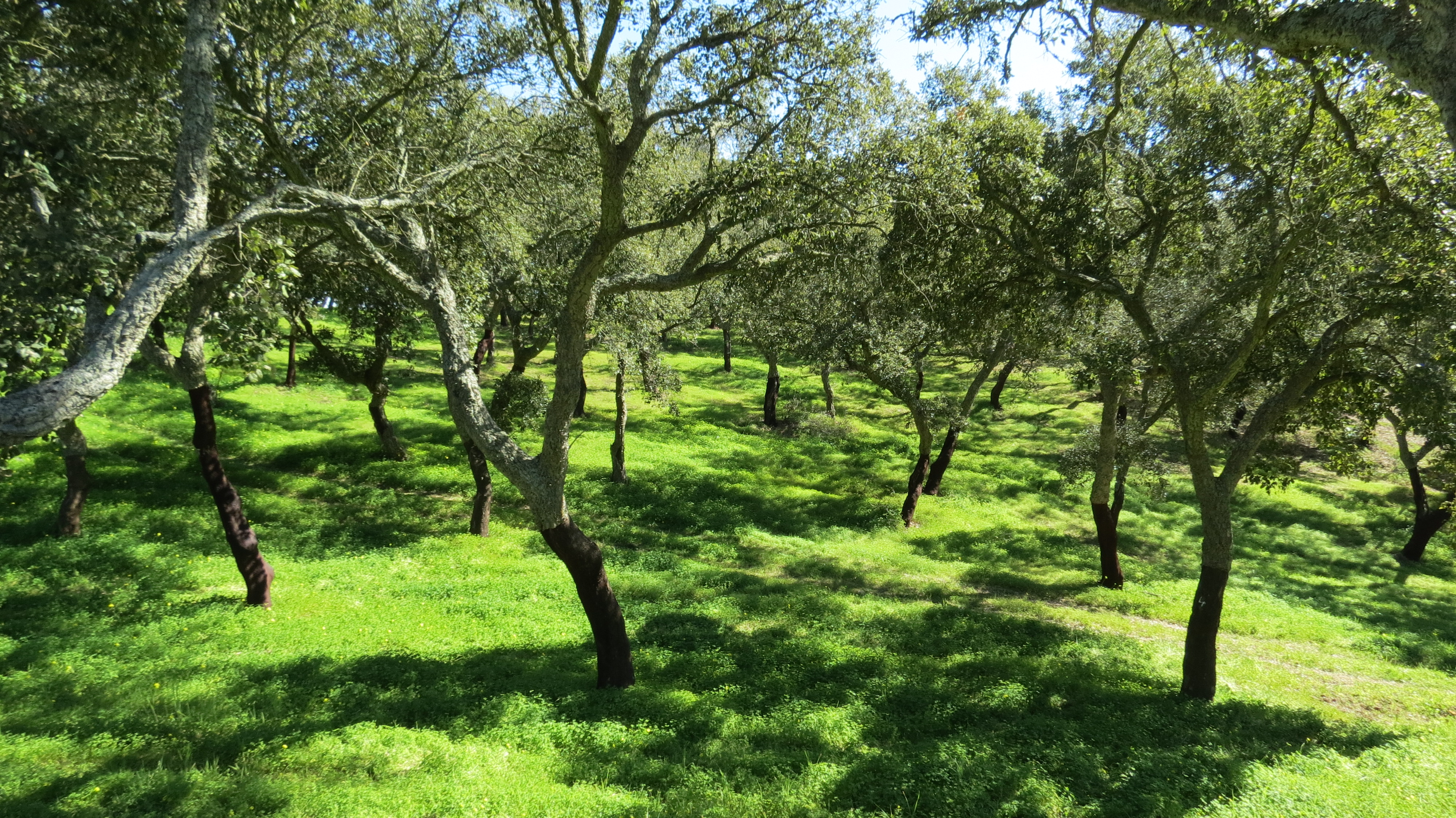
Cork oak montado in rural Sines

=== Physical geography ===
The municipalities territory is distinguished by three morphological structures: a coastal plain, the residual relief of the Sines Massif, and the eastern escarpment.

- The coastal plan (which occupies the major part of the municipality) slopes gradually from the interior and occupies an area of 3-12 kilometres cut by several water courses.
- Little remains of the Sines Massif, but from Monte Chãos to the Cape, there are elements of its morphology still present: the Sines promontory is relatively elevated from the sea, and limited by an abrupt escarpment, which slopes to the south until the Ribeira da Junqueira, where beaches and dunes predominate. But after the beach of Burrinho, it continues to be rugged until the vicinity of the island Pessegueiro, where beaches are also evident, while sheltered coves and mini-beaches, such as Porto Covinho, are inter-cut along the coastline. From the north of the city the coast is low sandy beach that extends to Tróia. From this coast, extensive dunes, particularly north of the mouth of Ribeira dos Moinhos dominate the landforms.
- The eastern escarpment, which is limited by the coastal plain forms part of the Serra do Cercal Massif (which rises 100–200 meters in altitude).

The coast, which is physically rugged (the Sines Cape) is separated into two differentiated areas: a sandy northern section, and a rocky southern area of cliffs.

=== Climate ===
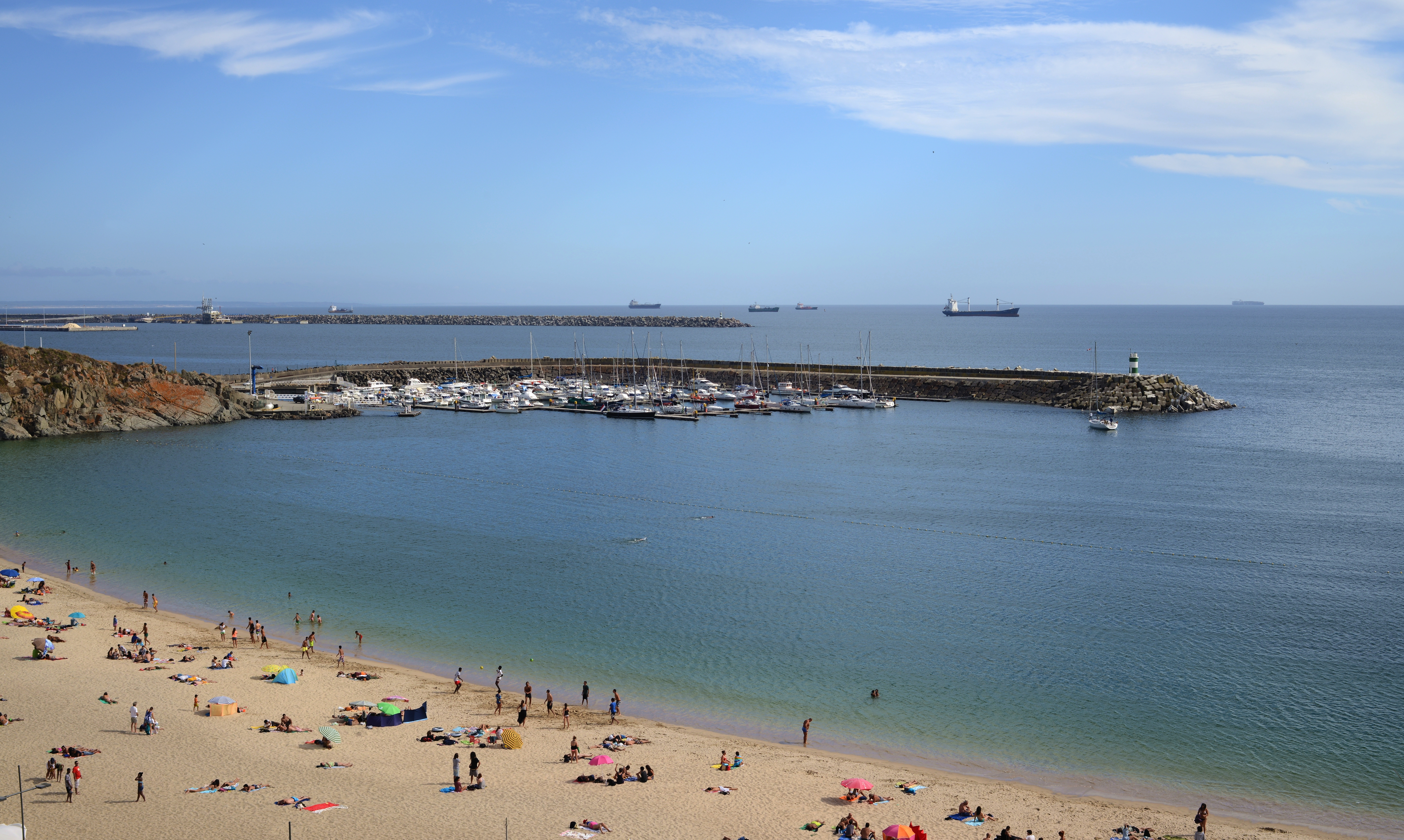
The old port and beach of Sines

Sines has a Mediterranean climate (Köppen: Csb/Csa) with mild, wet winters and warm, dry summers. It has little seasonal temperature variation, with temperatures remaining mostly between 10 and 25 °C (50 and 77 °F) throughout the year, owing to the strong upwelling common in the central and southwest Portuguese coasts. The city has close to 3000 hours of yearly sunshine.

Climate data for Sines, 1991-2020 normals and 1981-2020 extremes, altitude: 98 metres (322 ft) a.s.l.
Month	Jan	Feb	Mar	Apr	May	Jun	Jul	Aug	Sep	Oct	Nov	Dec	Year
Record high °C (°F)	21.5 (70.7)	24.8 (76.6)	30.3 (86.5)	31.0 (87.8)	36.7 (98.1)	38.4 (101.1)	40.7 (105.3)	40.7 (105.3)	39.2 (102.6)	33.3 (91.9)	26.7 (80.1)	24.3 (75.7)	40.7 (105.3)
Mean daily maximum °C (°F)	14.9 (58.8)	15.6 (60.1)	17.6 (63.7)	18.9 (66.0)	21.4 (70.5)	23.7 (74.7)	24.7 (76.5)	25.4 (77.7)	24.3 (75.7)	21.9 (71.4)	18.0 (64.4)	15.8 (60.4)	20.2 (68.4)
Daily mean °C (°F)	11.7 (53.1)	12.0 (53.6)	13.8 (56.8)	15.0 (59.0)	17.2 (63.0)	19.4 (66.9)	20.4 (68.7)	21.0 (69.8)	20.2 (68.4)	18.3 (64.9)	14.7 (58.5)	12.6 (54.7)	16.3 (61.3)
Mean daily minimum °C (°F)	8.4 (47.1)	8.5 (47.3)	9.9 (49.8)	11.1 (52.0)	13.0 (55.4)	15.2 (59.4)	16.1 (61.0)	16.5 (61.7)	16.1 (61.0)	14.6 (58.3)	11.4 (52.5)	9.3 (48.7)	12.5 (54.5)
Record low °C (°F)	−2.1 (28.2)	−0.1 (31.8)	−2.6 (27.3)	3.2 (37.8)	6.2 (43.2)	8.6 (47.5)	11.9 (53.4)	12.5 (54.5)	9.2 (48.6)	6.7 (44.1)	2.0 (35.6)	1.1 (34.0)	−2.6 (27.3)
Average precipitation mm (inches)	68.1 (2.68)	53.1 (2.09)	48.9 (1.93)	47.6 (1.87)	34.5 (1.36)	9.4 (0.37)	1.2 (0.05)	2.8 (0.11)	26.3 (1.04)	77.2 (3.04)	84.8 (3.34)	79.5 (3.13)	533.3 (21.00)
Average precipitation days (≥ 1 mm)	8.8	6.9	6.5	7.1	5.1	1.5	0.3	0.7	3.2	8.0	8.8	9.0	65.9
Mean monthly sunshine hours	167.9	182.9	227.6	267.8	317.5	327.2	345.9	333.7	270.9	215.3	172.1	162.8	2,991.6
Source 1: Instituto de Meteorologia
Source 2: weatheronline.co.uk (sunshine hours 2001–2018)

Climate data for Sines (Cape), 1971-2000 normals and extremes
Month	Jan	Feb	Mar	Apr	May	Jun	Jul	Aug	Sep	Oct	Nov	Dec	Year
Record high °C (°F)	21.5 (70.7)	24.5 (76.1)	28.0 (82.4)	31.0 (87.8)	36.7 (98.1)	33.0 (91.4)	37.1 (98.8)	37.0 (98.6)	35.5 (95.9)	29.0 (84.2)	25.5 (77.9)	23.5 (74.3)	37.1 (98.8)
Mean daily maximum °C (°F)	15.2 (59.4)	15.5 (59.9)	16.6 (61.9)	17.1 (62.8)	18.3 (64.9)	20.2 (68.4)	21.5 (70.7)	21.7 (71.1)	21.6 (70.9)	20.0 (68.0)	17.9 (64.2)	16.1 (61.0)	18.5 (65.3)
Daily mean °C (°F)	12.2 (54.0)	12.8 (55.0)	13.7 (56.7)	14.5 (58.1)	16.0 (60.8)	17.9 (64.2)	19.1 (66.4)	19.2 (66.6)	19.0 (66.2)	17.3 (63.1)	15.1 (59.2)	13.3 (55.9)	15.8 (60.5)
Mean daily minimum °C (°F)	9.2 (48.6)	10.0 (50.0)	10.8 (51.4)	11.9 (53.4)	13.6 (56.5)	15.6 (60.1)	16.8 (62.2)	16.8 (62.2)	16.4 (61.5)	14.7 (58.5)	12.3 (54.1)	10.5 (50.9)	13.2 (55.8)
Record low °C (°F)	0.5 (32.9)	1.8 (35.2)	2.5 (36.5)	3.2 (37.8)	8.0 (46.4)	8.6 (47.5)	12.5 (54.5)	12.5 (54.5)	9.2 (48.6)	6.7 (44.1)	4.5 (40.1)	1.8 (35.2)	0.5 (32.9)
Average rainfall mm (inches)	72.8 (2.87)	56.7 (2.23)	39.1 (1.54)	48.5 (1.91)	32.3 (1.27)	7.9 (0.31)	2.9 (0.11)	2.0 (0.08)	19.1 (0.75)	60.2 (2.37)	85.1 (3.35)	84.4 (3.32)	511 (20.11)
Average rainy days (≥ 0.1 mm)	11.2	11.2	9.4	11.1	7.5	3.2	1.1	1.1	4.3	8.4	9.0	12.6	90.1
Mean monthly sunshine hours	167.9	182.9	227.6	267.8	317.5	327.2	345.9	333.7	270.9	215.3	172.1	162.8	2,991.6
Source 1: Instituto de Meteorologia
Source 2: weatheronline.co.uk (sunshine hours 2001–2018)

=== Human geography ===
Population of the Municipality of Sines (1801 - 2011)
Year	Pop.	±%
1801	1,766	—
1849	2,632	+49.0%
1930	7,666	+191.3%
1960	8,866	+15.7%
1981	12,075	+36.2%
1991	12,347	+2.3%
2001	13,577	+10.0%
2004	13,613	+0.3%
2011	14,238	+4.6%

Sines is limited on its southern frontier by Odemira Municipality, north and northeast by Santiago do Cacém Municipality, while the southern part of the municipality (south of São Torpes) is part of the Parque Natural do Sudoeste Alentejano e Costa Vicentina (English: St. Vincent and Southwest Alentejo Coast Natural Park). A small part of the north also belongs to the Reserva Natural da Lagoa de Santo André e da Sancha (English: Natural Reserves of Lake Saint Andre and Sancha). Sines is 150 kilometers south of Lisbon.

Sines Municipality was constituted, until 1485, from the parishes of Sines, Colos and the area that today corresponds to the parish of Vila Nova do Milfontes. In 1485, King D. John II, with the objective of settling the area of coastal Alentejo, created the municipality of Vila Nova de Milfontes, and included the area of Cercal. Colos also became a municipality in 1499, restricting Sines to its present area.

In 1855, along with other municipalities, Sines ceased to exist and became integrated into Santiago do Cacém as the parish of São Salvador. Although it lost its autonomy, the settlements flourished for a time; Sines regained its autonomy in 1914.

Administratively, the municipality is divided into 2 civil parishes (freguesias):

- Porto Covo - the tourist-centered parish, along the southern frontier of Sines, settled by Jacinto Fernandes Bandeira, to motivate settlement at the end of the 18th century, has grown to include 1400 annual inhabitants;
- Sines - the main parish and town within the municipality, with a population of 15000. Not self-governing.

== Economy ==
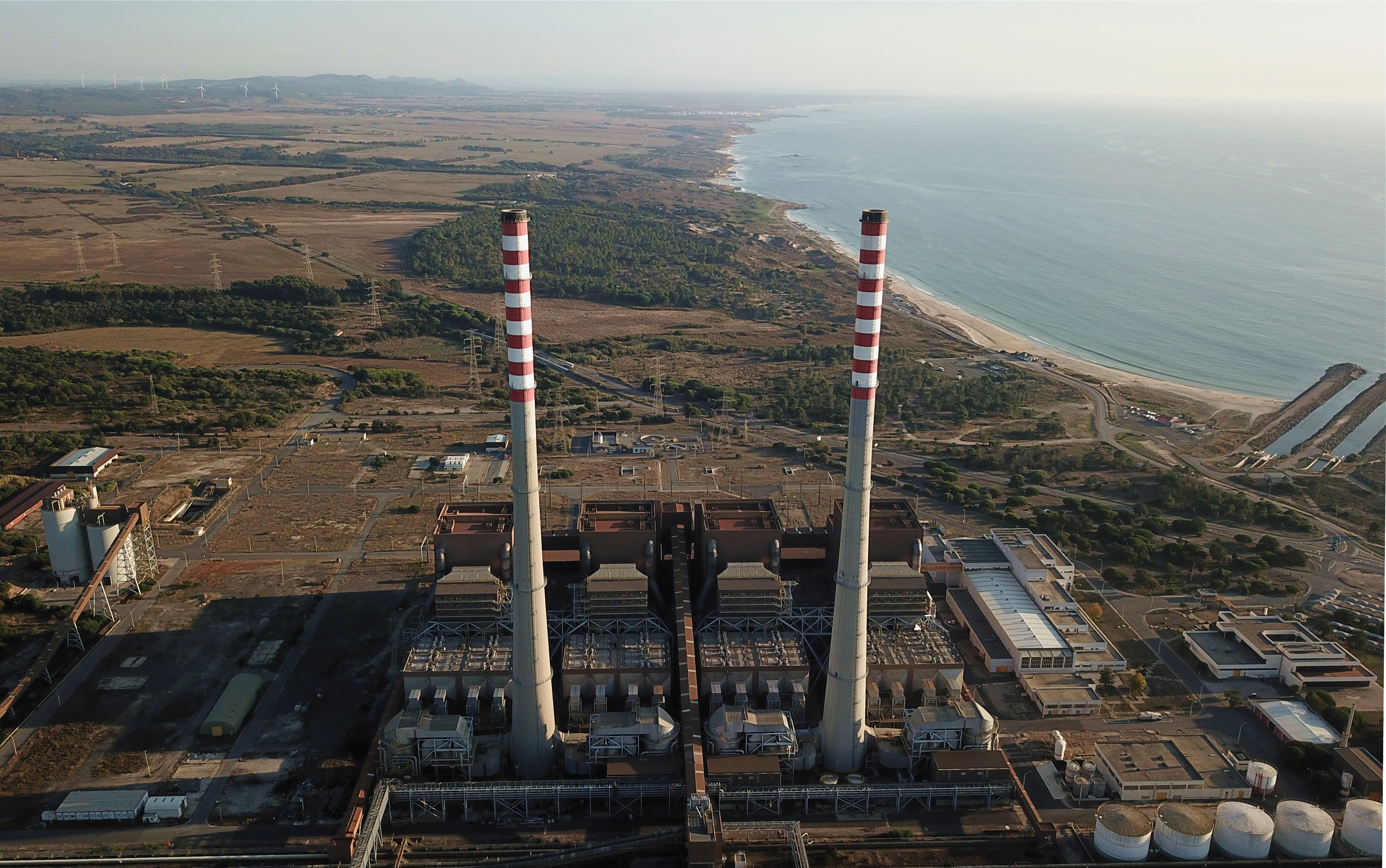
Thermoelectric Power Plant of Sines

The economy of Sines municipality depends on energy, oil refining, port activity, fishing, tourism and trade. The municipality has an important investment park managed by AICEP Global Parques, and a science park, the Sines Tecnopolo.

Sines is the location of one of the largest maritime-industrial complexes in Portugal, whose tenants include Sines Power Plant (Electricidade de Portugal), Petrogal Sines (National Petrochemic Refinery) and Repsol (Polymer Refinery). Although rapidly industrializing, the town still preserves many of the historical landmarks and tries to cater to tourism. The nearby village of Porto Covo attracts many tourists owing to its coastline and the well-preserved historical buildings.

There is a large shortwave broadcasting station at Sines. The most remarkable antenna towers are the rotatable towers looking like a big "V". . It was used by Deutsche Welle and was switched off on November 1, 2011.

Railways serve the cargo traffic and petroleum industry, but there is no more passenger train service; the city's station has been converted into a restaurant.

=== Sines Port & the 'Silk Road' ===
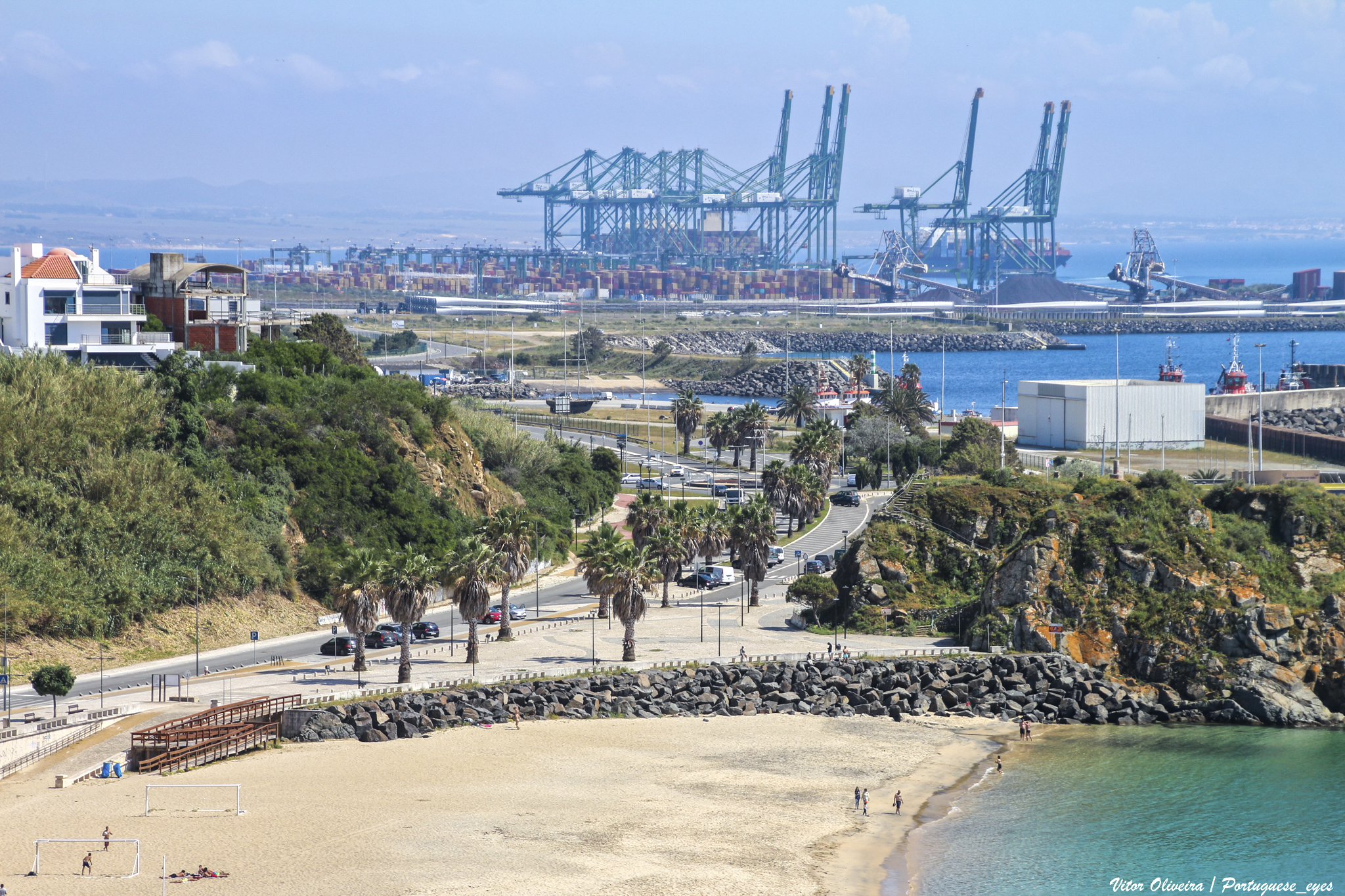
The Port cranes seen from Sines

The Schiller Institute updated its 2014 study on the impact of the Chinese 'New Silk Road' project and considers that the Alentejo port of Sines is a fundamental link for the success of this global initiative. The port is considered by the world's leading experts in the sector as a key link in the global trade liaison project launched in 2013 by the current paramount leader of the People's Republic of China, in particular for its special and privileged geostrategic position of connecting the continents of Africa and North and South America.

The latest version of the study 'The New Silk Road becomes the world's terrestrial bridge: a shared future for mankind', which updates a first version of 2014 by the Schiller Institute (Germany) considers that the port of Sines is one of the two "critical points" for the development of this project, due to its more Atlantic vocation, alongside the Spanish port of Algeciras, which is more Mediterranean. "Not only Spain, but also Portugal, have eagerly welcomed Xi's proposal and, over the last year, have been actively working on specific proposals and projects to make this a reality," said the Schiller Institute study. However, this situation may have changed in recent weeks, with advantage to Portugal, since Spanish policymakers have not hidden a certain opposition to the growth of Chinese investment in the neighboring country, unlike Portugal, which is to strengthen political, diplomatic and economic relations with the People's Republic of China, as was seen during the past week, with Chinese leader Xi Jinping's official visit to Portugal.

During that time, the theme of the port of Sines was certainly at the table of talks at the highest level, as it is well known that several Chinese groups are interested in securing the concession of a new container terminal in Sines, supposedly named Vasco da Gama, and whose public tender is slow to proceed. "The Iberian Peninsula is in fact the natural geographical interface of the economic belt of the 'Silk Road', which now stretches from the Pacific to the Atlantic through the land mass of Eurasia, with the 'Silk Sea Route' to the Iberian-American, Caribbean and United States, as well as south towards Africa," says the study of the institute led by Helga and Lindon La Rouche. During the official visit of the General Secretary of the Chinese Communist Party this week, Xi Jinping has repeatedly mentioned the interest of the world's second largest economy in investing in and creating business partnerships with Portuguese companies and other entities in the field of port infrastructure and the economy of the sea, among other sectors of activity. Aware of this lively interest of the People's Republic of China in our assets in port infrastructure and the continental shelf, one of the largest in the world, the Minister of the Sea, Ana Paula Vitorino led, about a year ago, an official visit to the Middle Kingdom, with one of the largest business rewards ever - 126 companies.

The results of these contacts and talks could soon be known, knowing that China's interest is not limited to the new container terminal in Sines. The Alentejo port, due to its geographical location and natural conditions that allow the large vessels to dock - which continue to grow in size from year to year - has other advantages, including energy, logistics, and other branches of activity. The port of Sines is the largest national port in a busy cargo, with a share of more than 50% of the total Portuguese port sector of the continent. According to data released by the AMT - Mobility and Transport Authority - in the first nine months of this year, the port of Sines handled a total of 36.3 million tonnes of goods. Despite a 6% drop compared to the same period last year, the Alentejo port was responsible for a 51.4% share of the national port sector from January to September, excluding the Autonomous Regions of the Azores and Madeira.

In the containerized cargo segment, the predominance of the port of Sines is even more evident. Despite a slight fall of 0.1% in the period under review with respect to the number of TEUs (the standard measure equivalent to 20-foot-long containers) moved, the Alentejo port handled a total of nine of 16.5 million tons in this cargo segment, 11% more than in the same period of last year. Thus, the port of Sines accounted for 58.2% of the containerized cargo handled in mainland Portugal during the first three quarters, having been in the top 100 of the world's largest container ports for several years.

== Architecture ==
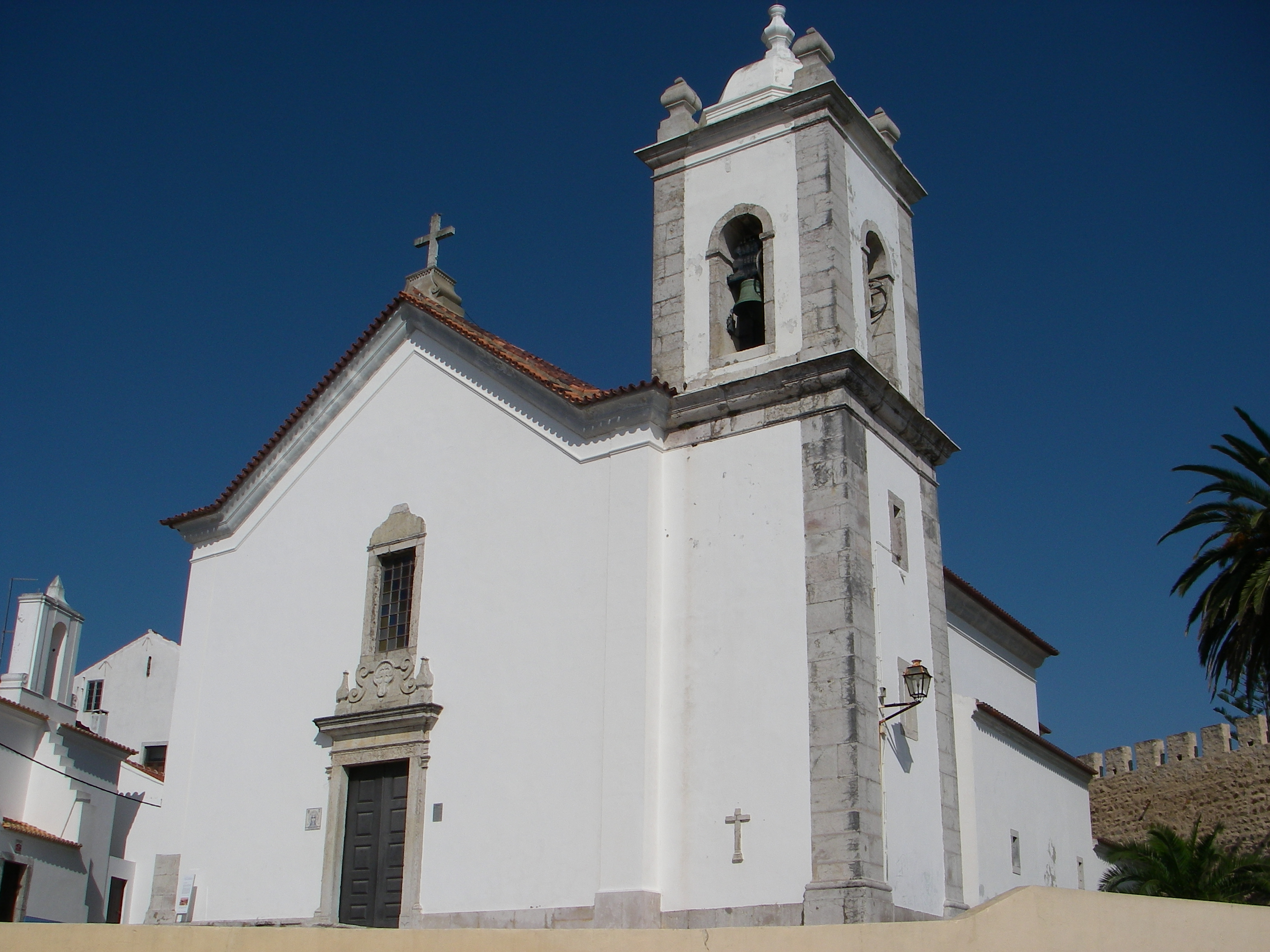
The front façade of the Matriz Church of Sines

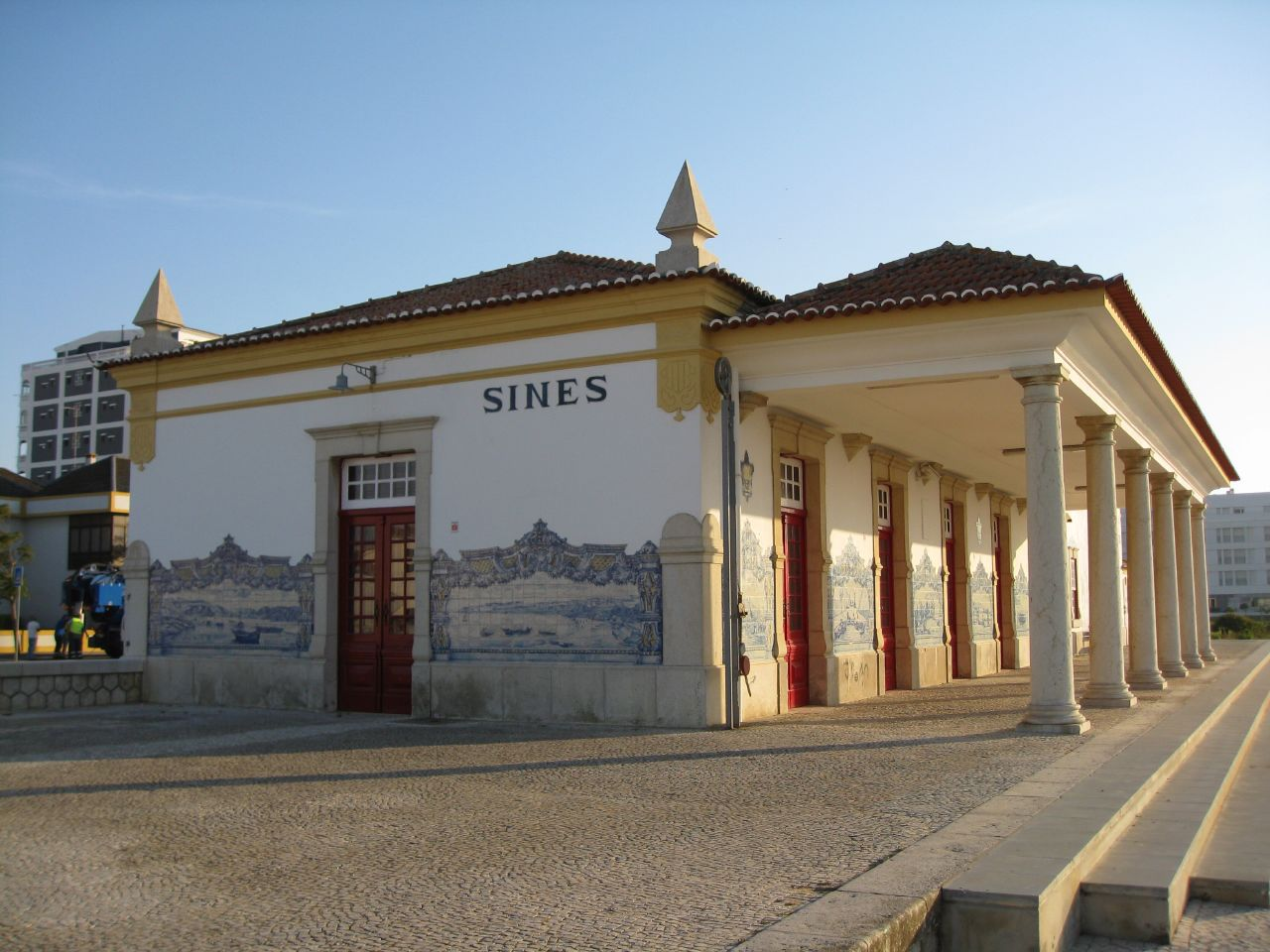
Old railway station of Sines

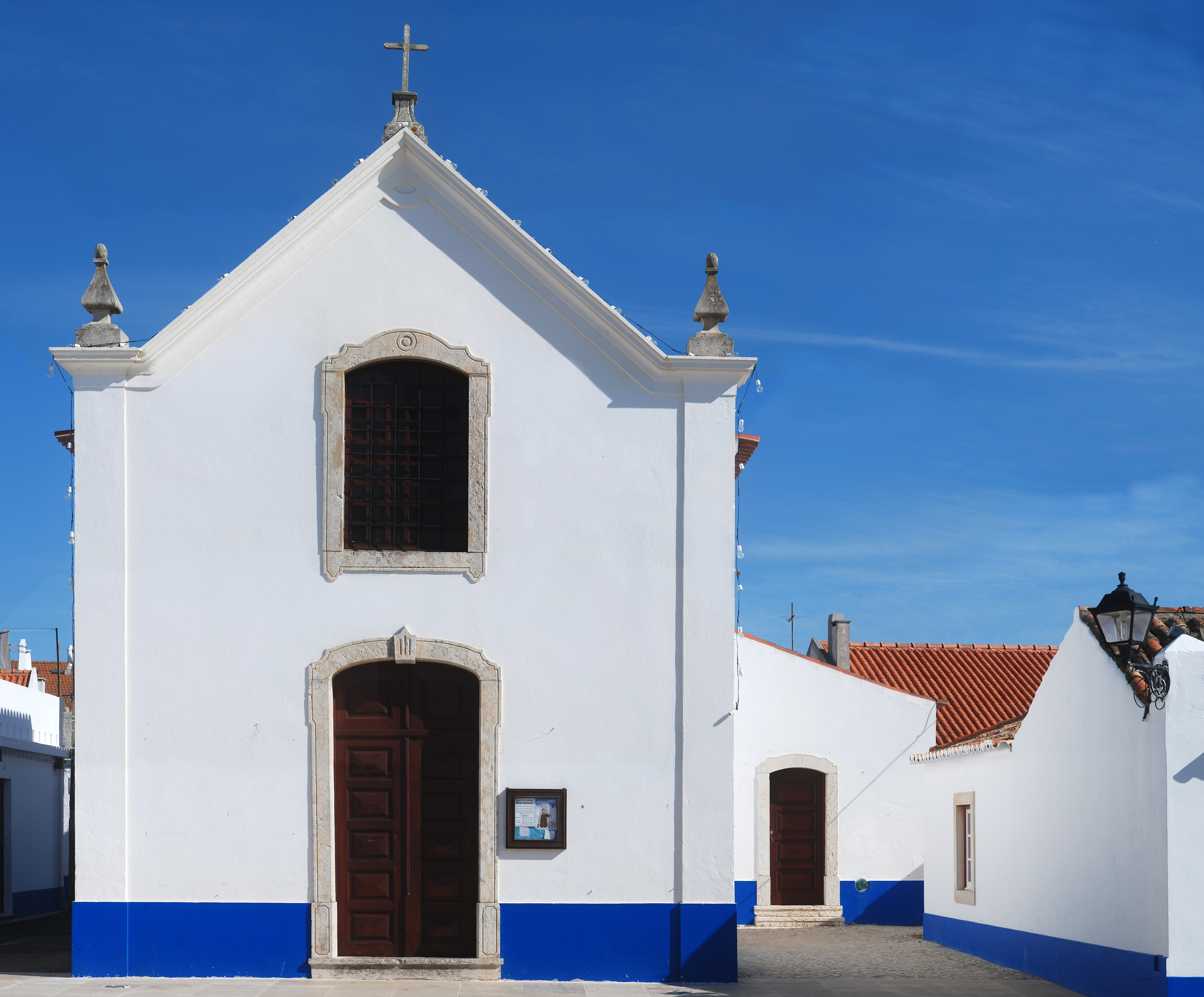
The simple façade of the Church of Porto Covo

=== Civic ===
- A Primorosa (Portuguese: Loja A Primorosa)
- Arts Centre of Sines (Portuguese: Centro de Artes de Sines)
- Cinema/Theatre Vasco da Gama (Portuguese: Cine-Teatro Vasco da Gama)
- Customs Delegation of Sines (Portuguese: Delegação Aduaneira de Sines)
- Emmérico Nunes Cultural Centre (Portuguese: Hospital da Misericórdia/Hospital do Espírito Santo/Centro Cultural Emmérico Nunes)
- Fountain of D. Bataça (Portuguese: Chafariz de D. Bataça)
- Fountain of Caminho das Bicas (Portuguese: Chafariz do Caminho das Bicas)
- Sines Lighthouse (Portuguese: Farol de Sines)
- Pidwell Residence/Palace (Portuguese: Casa Pidwell/Palácio Pidwell)
- Railroad Station of Sines (Portuguese: Estação Ferroviária de Sines)
- Ravine Warehouses (Portuguese: Armazéns da Ribeira)
- Statue of Vasco da Gama (Portuguese: Estatua de Vasco da Gama)
- Windmill of Monte Chãos (Portuguese: Moinho de Vento de Monte Chãos)
- Wine Cellar of Sines (Portuguese: Adega de Sines)

=== Military ===
- Castle of Sines (Portuguese: Castelo de Sines)
- Cross of São Torpes (Portuguese: Cruzeiro de São Torpes)
- Fort of Pessegueiro (Portuguese: Forte do Pessegueiro)
- Fort of Pessegueiro Island (Portuguese: Forte de Ilha do Pessegueiro)
- Fort of Revelim (Portuguese: Forte de Nossa Senhora das Salas/Forte de Nossa Senhora das Salvas/Forte do Revelim)

=== Religious ===
- Chapel of the Misericórdia (Portuguese: Capela da Misericórdia)
- Church of Porto Covo (Portuguese: Igreja de Porto Covo)
- Church of São Salvador (Portuguese: Igreja Matriz de São Salvador)
- Hermitage of Nossa Senhora dos Remédios (Portuguese: Ermida de Nossa Senhora dos Remédios)
- Hermitage of Nossa Senhora das Salas (Portuguese: Ermida da Nossa Senhora das Salas)
- Hermitage of São Bartolomeu (Portuguese: Ermida de São Bartolomeu)
- (Old) Hermitage of São Sebastião (Portuguese: Ermida Velha de São Sebastião/Igreja Evangélica)

== Culture ==
=== Festivals ===
Every summer, the town hosts the FMM Sines - Festival Músicas do Mundo, a world music festival that brings thousands of enthusiasts and musicians from all continents.

== Notable citizens ==
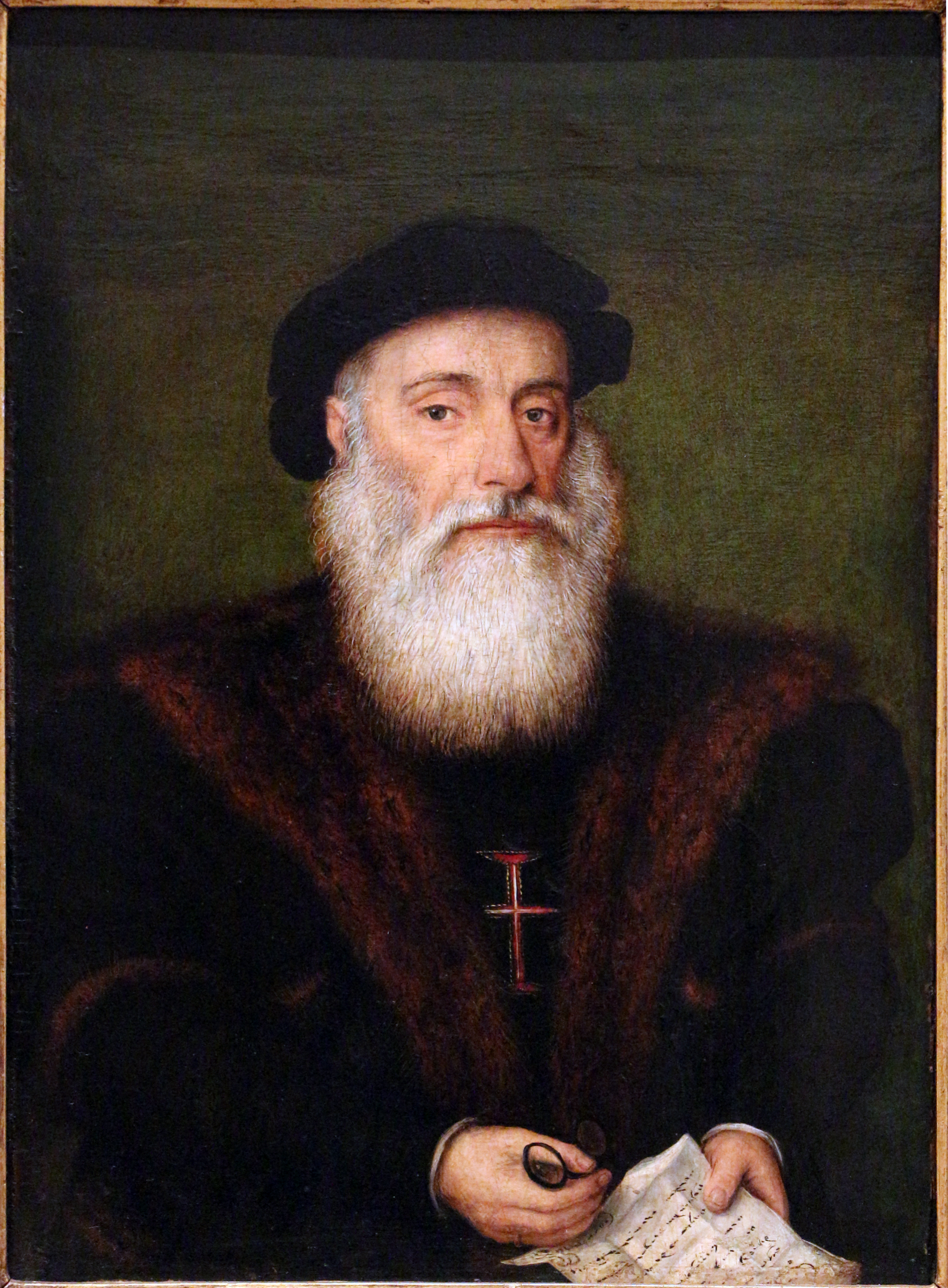
Vasco da Gama

- Estêvão da Gama (ca.1430's–1497) a wealthy knight, father of explorer Vasco da Gama.
- Vasco da Gama, 1st Count of Vidigueira (ca.1460's– 1524) a Portuguese explorer and the commander of the first ships to India; Governor of Portuguese India in 1524. Son of Estêvão da Gama the local alcalde. On return from India, he was given feudal rights over Sines.
- Cláudia de Campos (1859–1916), writer and activist whose 1899 novel Elle is set in Sines
- João Daniel de Sines, O Raspalhista, GColTE (ca.1809-1878) a liberalist sympathizer and hero of the Liberal Wars, with medical knowledge of outbreaks of cholera (1856) and yellow-fever (1857).
- João Martins (1927–1993) a Portuguese footballer with 204 club caps and 11 with Portugal
- Mário Rui (born 1991) a footballer with over 250 club caps and 11 for Portugal
