= List of festivals in Portugal =

The following is a list of festivals in Portugal.

== By type ==
=== Film festivals ===
- Black & White Festival (2004-) - Porto
- Caminhos do Cinema Português - Coimbra
- Curtas Vila do Conde (1993-) - Vila do Conde
- Doclisboa - Lisbon
- Douro Film Harvest
- Estoril Film Festival - Estoril
- Fantasporto - Porto
- FEST New Directors New Films Festival (2004-) - Espinho
- Festroia International Film Festival (1985-) - Setúbal
- Lisbon Gay & Lesbian Film Festival (1997-) - Lisbon
- Olhares do Mediterrâneo - Cinema no Feminino (2014-) - Lisbon

=== Music festivals ===
- Avante! Festival (1976-) - Amora, Seixal
- Boom Festival (1997-) - Idanha-a-Nova
- Cascais Jazz Festival (1971–1988) - Cascais
- Festival da Canção (1964-)
- Festival Forte (2014-) - Montemor-o-Velho
- Festival Sudoeste (1997-) - Zambujeira do Mar
- FMM Sines – Festival Músicas do Mundo (1999-) - Sines
- Laurus Nobilis Music Famalicão (2015-) - Vila Nova de Famalicão
- NOS Alive (2007-) - Algés (Oeiras)
- NOS Primavera Sound (2012-) - Porto
- Paredes de Coura Festival (1993-) - Paredes de Coura
- Rock in Rio - Lisbon
- Super Bock Super Rock (1994-)
- Vilar de Mouros Festival (1971-) - Vilar de Mouros
- Vagos Open Air (2009-) - Calvão (Vagos)
- Vinculum (2022) - Mondim de Basto

== By location ==
The following is a list of Portuguese festivals held in only one or a few of the Districts and/or Autonomous Regions of Portugal. Nationwide festivals are not included.

=== Aveiro ===
- FEST New Directors New Films Festival (2004-) - Espinho
- Vagos Open Air (2009-) - Calvão (Vagos)

=== Azores ===
- Festas do Senhor Santo Cristo dos Milagres in Ponta Delgada
- Festas do Divino Espírito Santo

=== Beja ===
- Festival Sudoeste (1997-) - Zambujeira do Mar

=== Braga ===
==== Guimarães ====
- Gualterianas
- Nicolinas

==== Póvoa de Varzim ====
- Anjo Festival

=== Bragança ===
- Careto - Podence (Macedo de Cavaleiros)

=== Castelo Branco ===
- Boom Festival (1997-) - Idanha-a-Nova

=== Coimbra ===
- Caminhos do Cinema Português - Coimbra
- Festival Forte (2014-) - Montemor-o-Velho

=== Faro ===
- Craft, Tourism, Agricultural, Commercial and Industrial Fair of Lagoa (1980-) - Lagoa
- International Sand Sculpture Festival (2003-ongoing) - Pêra (Silves)

=== Lisbon ===
- Doclisboa - Lisbon
- Estoril Film Festival - Estoril
- Lisbon Book Fair - Lisbon
- Lisbon Feminist Festival
- Lisbon Gay & Lesbian Film Festival (1997-) - Lisbon
- Ludopolis (2012-) - Lisbon
- NOS Alive (2007-) - Algés (Oeiras)
- Olhares do Mediterrâneo - Cinema no Feminino (2014-) - Lisbon
- Rock in Rio - Lisbon

=== Porto ===
- Anjo Festival
- Black & White Festival (2004-) - Porto
- Curtas Vila do Conde (1993-) - Vila do Conde
- Fantasporto - Porto
- Festa de São João do Porto - Porto
- Festivals of Póvoa de Varzim - Póvoa de Varzim
- NOS Primavera Sound (2012-) - Porto
- Porto Book Fair
- Porto Pride (2001-) - Porto
- Póvoa de Varzim Holiday - Póvoa de Varzim
- Romaria de S. Gonçalo e S. Cristóvão (17th century-) - Vila Nova de Gaia
- Festa de S. Pedro da Afurada - Vila Nova de Gaia
- Festa da Nossa Senhora da Saúde - Vila Nova de Gaia

=== Santarém ===
- Festa dos Tabuleiros - Tomar

=== Setúbal ===
- Avante! Festival (1976-) - Amora, Seixal
- Festroia International Film Festival (1985-) - Setúbal
- FMM Sines – Festival Músicas do Mundo (1999-) - Sines

=== Viana do Castelo ===
- Paredes de Coura Festival (1993-) - Paredes de Coura
- Vilar de Mouros Festival (1971-) - Vilar de Mouros
- Neopop (2006-) - Viana do Castelo

=== Vila Real ===
- Rock Nordeste
- Vinculum

== See also ==
- Sarau (event)
