= B&W =

B&W, B/W or B+W may refer to:

== Companies ==
- Babcock & Wilcox, an American manufacturing company
- Brown & Williamson, a former American tobacco company, now merged with R. J. Reynolds
- Bowers & Wilkins, a British loudspeaker company
- Bra & Wessels, a Swedish chain of department stores, since 2001 known as Coop Forum
- Burmeister & Wain, Danish ship yard and diesel engine producer
- Boeing & Westervelt, precursor company to Boeing
- B+W Filterfabrik, a photographic filter manufacturer now owned by Schneider Kreuznach

== Other ==
- Black and white, as it refers to photography or cinematography
- Grayscale
- Power Macintosh G3 (Blue & White), a computer model made by Apple Computer
- College van Burgemeester en Wethouders, the Dutch municipal executive
- Black & White Festival, the Portuguese audiovisual festival
- b/w (meaning "backed with"), an abbreviation often used to separate the listing of the two sides of a vinyl record, especially a 45 record
- Blue and White (political alliance), a political alliance in Israel
- Black & White or B & W, an Indian television news programme hosted by Sudhir Chaudhary on Aaj Tak

== See also ==
- BW (disambiguation)
- Black and white (disambiguation)
- Monochrome (disambiguation)
