= BW =

BW or Bw may stand for:

== Businesses and organizations ==
- Baldwin Wallace University, Berea, Ohio, US
- Bergesen Worldwide, a shipping company
- Best Western, a hotel company
- British Waterways
- Brush Engineered Materials (NYSE stock symbol BW)
- Bundeswehr, the armed forces of Germany
- Former BWIA West Indies Airways (IATA Airline code BW)
- Caribbean Airlines (IATA airline code BW)

== Places ==
- Baden-Württemberg, a federal state of Germany
- Bangladesh, WMO country code
- Botswana (ISO 2-letter country code)
  - .bw, Internet Top Level Domain, Botswana

== In science, technology, and mathematics ==
- Bahnbetriebswerk, locomotive depot in German
- Bandwidth (disambiguation), abbreviation
- Bargmann–Wigner equations, in quantum field theory
- SAP Business Information Warehouse or SAP BW, software
- Body weight, e.g. when calculating dosage
- Brauer-Wall group, a super-graded version of the Brauer group in mathematics

== Other uses ==
- b/w ("backed with"), on record singles
- Burgerlijk Wetboek, Netherlands civil code
- Rosemary Lyons, "Beautiful Wife" of Earl Wilson
- StarCraft: Brood War, initials for the StarCraft expansion
- Brisk walk is commonly abbreviated as "BW" in casual writings especially in social media, amongst health and fitness enthusiasts
- Pokémon Black and White, two of the main games from the 5th generation of Pokémon (video game series)

== See also ==
- BVV (disambiguation)
- B&W (disambiguation)
