= Colourless =

Colourless or colorless may refer to:

- Transparency and translucency, transmitting all or most colours
  - Neutral-density filter
- Black and white, a form of visual representation that does not use color
  - Grayscale

== See also ==
- Black and white (disambiguation)
- Monochrome (disambiguation)
- Neutral (disambiguation)
- Boredom
- Colorfulness
- Shades of gray
