= Black and White =

Black and white is a form of visual representation that does not use colors.

Black and white or Black and White may also refer to:

== Film and television ==
- Black and White (1913 film), an American silent comedy starring Harry Carey
- Black and White (1931 film), a French comedy starring Raimu and Fernandel
- Black and White (1932 film), a Soviet short animated film
- Black and White (1932 race film), a never-completed Russian film project about African Americans with a cast that included Dorothy West
- Black and White (1999 drama film), a drama directed by James Toback
- Black and White (1999 TV film), a thriller starring Gina Gershon
- Black and White (2002 film), an Australian film starring Robert Carlyle
- Black & White (2008 Hindi film), starring Anil Kapoor
- Black & White (2008 Telugu film), starring Rajeev Kanakala and Sindhu Tolani
- Black and White (2008 Italian film), a 2008 Italian romance film
- Black and White (2010 film), a Turkish film
- Black & White (TV series), a 2009 Taiwanese television series
- Black & White, an Indian television news programme hosted by Sudhir Chaudhary on Aaj Tak
- Black and White (audio drama), 2012, based on Doctor Who

== Gaming ==
- Black & White (video game), by Lionhead Studios
  - Black & White: Creature Isle a 2002 expansion pack
  - Black & White 2, a 2005 sequel
  - Black & White 2: Battle of the Gods, a 2006 expansion pack
- Pokémon Black and White, handheld video games for the Nintendo DS
  - Pokémon Black 2 and White 2, 2012 sequels

== Literature ==
- Black and White: Land, Labor, and Politics in the South, an 1884 book published in the U.S. by Timothy Thomas Fortune
- Black & White (magazine), a British illustrated weekly 1891–1912
- "Блек энд уайт" a 1925 Russian-language poem by Vladimir Vladimirovich Mayakovsky
- Black & White (book), 1980, about the Jonestown Massacre by Shiva Naipaul
- Black and White (picture book), a 1990 children's picture book by David Macaulay
- Black+White, an Australian cultural magazine published from 1992 to 2007
- Black & White (Birmingham newspaper), an alternative biweekly newspaper published in Birmingham, Alabama from 1992 to 2013
- Black & White, a 2007 novel by Dani Shapiro
- Black and White (novel), a 2009 superhero novel by Kessler and Kittredge
- The Black and White, the newspaper of Walt Whitman High School (Maryland)

== Music ==
=== Songs ===
- "Black and White" (Kylie and Garibay song), 2015
- "Black and White" (Static-X song), 2001
- "Black and White" (Three Dog Night song) originally written by David I. Arkin, 1972
- "Black and White" (Niall Horan song), 2020
- "Black & White" (Natalie Duncan song)
- "Crno i belo" ("Black and White"), 2012, by Kaliopi
- "Black and White", by the dB's on Stands for Decibels
- "Black and White", by Deep Purple on The House of Blue Light
- "Black and White" (INXS song), by INXS on Shabooh Shoobah
- "Black and White", by Jackson Browne on Lives in the Balance
- "Black and White", by Loudness on Metal Mad
- "Black and White", by Sarah McLachlan on Surfacing
- "Black and White", by Screaming Jets on World Gone Crazy
- "Black and White", by The String Cheese Incident on Outside Inside
- "Black and White", by Todd Rundgren on Faithful
- "Black and White", by The Upper Room on Other People's Problems
- "Black & White", a 2006 song by AAA
- "Black & White", by In Flames on Reroute to Remain
- "Black & White" (Juice Wrld song), 2018
- "Black & White", by Todrick Hall featuring Superfruit from Straight Outta Oz (Deluxe Edition)
- "Black † White", the opening song for the anime Problem Children are Coming from Another World, Aren't They?, by Iori Nomizu
- "The Black & White", a song by NOFX from Heavy Petting Zoo

=== Albums ===
- Black and White (BoDeans album), 1991
- Black & White (Colleen Hewett album), 2015
- Black and White: the Definitive Collection, 1996, a 20-track compilation of Ewan MacColl's work
- Black & White (Flow album), 2012
- Black & White (G.NA album), 2011
- The Black and White Album, by The Hives
- The Black & White Album, 2007, by Imani Coppola
- Black & White (Janie Frickie album), 1986
- Black & White (The Maine album), 2010
- Black & White (Pointer Sisters album), 1981
- Black & White (Royal Tailor album), 2011
- Black & White 050505, 2005, by Simple Minds
- Black and White (The Stranglers album), 1978
- Black and White (Tony Joe White album), 1969
- Black and White (Wretch 32 album), 2011
- Black and White (soundtrack), the soundtrack to the 1999 film
- Black and White (EP), 2010, by Dimmi Argus
- Black & White, 2011, by John's Children

=== Other uses in music ===
- Black & White Records, a jazz record label, progressive in the 1940s
- Black and White (rap group), a Soviet and Russian rap group
- Black and White (ballet), 1988, by Peter Martins

== Other uses ==
- Black and white (police vehicle), an American slang term for a police car
- Black & White (whisky), a blended whisky
- Black & White Publishing, Scottish company
- Black & White Motorways Ltd, a subsidiary of National Bus Company (UK)
- Black & White Festival, an annual audiovisual festival in Portugal

== See also ==
- B&W (disambiguation)
- Black N White, a Jon Jones produced album
- A Black and White Night (disambiguation)
- Black on white (disambiguation)
- Black or White (disambiguation)
- Black (disambiguation)
- White (disambiguation)
- Black. White., a reality television show
- "Black versus White", a 2009 song by Apoptygma Berzerk on Rocket Science
- "Black/White" a 1985 song by Mr. Mister on Welcome to the Real World
- black&write!, an Australian writing fellowship
- Blacks & Whites, a board game
- Blacks and Whites, Virginia, a town in the US later known as Blackstone
- Black and white cookie, a shortbread type
- Black–white binary, a paradigm in critical race theory
- Black-and-white dualism
- Black-and-white mannikin, a bird
- Black-and-white Revival architecture, the 19th century revival of vernacular architecture
- Black and white thinking
- Black and white village, term for villages of a particular architectural style
- Newcastle United F.C., whose colours are black and white
- The Black and White Minstrel Show, a British television series (1958–78)
