= Lisbon Pride =

Gay Pride Parade in Lisbon, Portugal

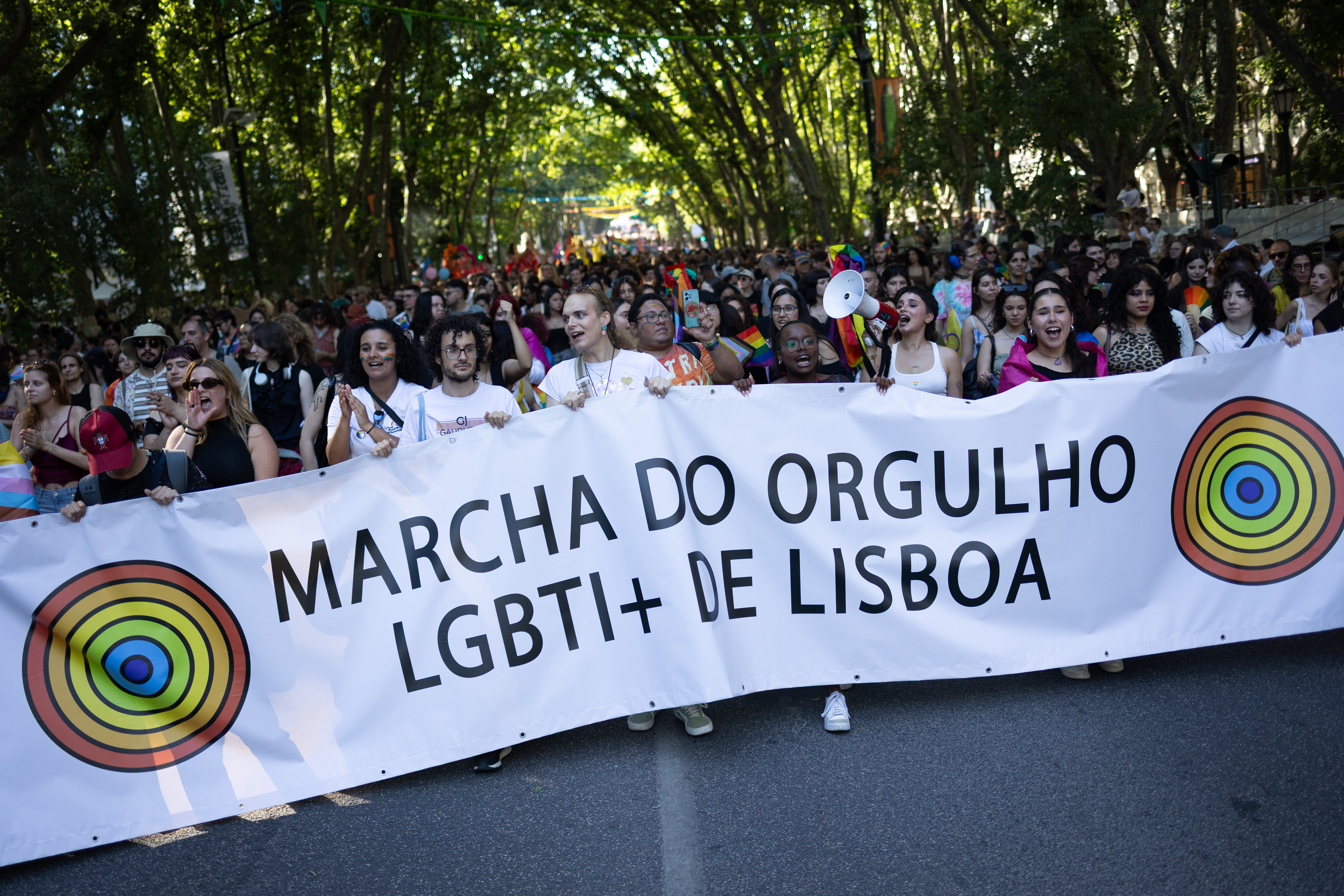
Lisbon Pride 2025

The Lisbon Pride is an annual pride march held in Lisbon, Portugal, to commemorate the International LGBT Pride Day and to celebrate the achievements in recognizing the rights of people belonging to the sexual diversity spectrum. The march, first held in June 2000, is the largest of its kind in the country, gathering tens of thousands of participants each year, reaching 25,000 in 2022.

During the march, participants carry LGBT flags and chant slogans for equality and against discrimination. The traditional route begins at the Jardim do Príncipe Real, passes through Largo de Camões and continues along Rua do Alecrim until reaching Ribeira das Naus, though on some occasions, it has had other routes and starting points, such as the Praça do Martim Moniz. Once at Ribeira das Naus, the march turns into a pride festival.

== History ==
The first event in honor of LGBT Pride in Lisbon took place on June 28, 1995, when activists from the GTH-PSR group gathered at the Climacz bar to celebrate International LGBT Pride Day, an event that was covered by the press. In 1997, the first Arraial Pride party was held, which was a landmark as it brought the LGBT pride celebration to the streets of Lisbon for the first time, and since then, it has become an annual mass event.

The LGBT Pride March of Lisbon was first held on June 28, 2000. Among the event’s coordinators was the activist Fabíola Cardoso, who later became a member of parliament for the Left Bloc and who read a manifesto for LGBT visibility prepared by the organizing groups at the end of the march.

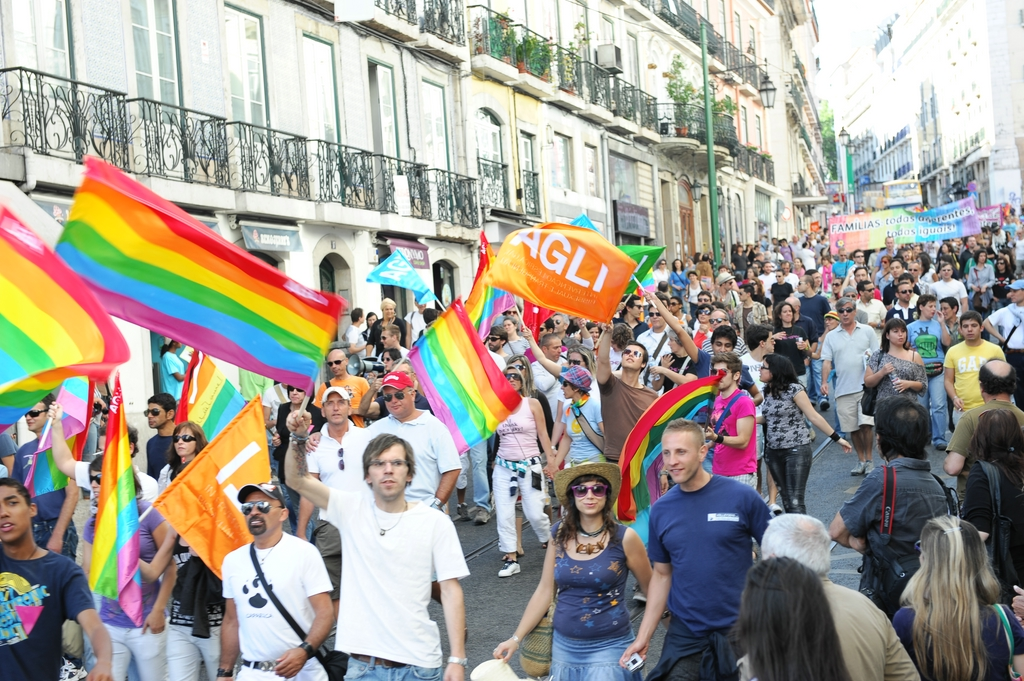
Participants in the 2010 Lisbon LGBT Pride March.

Over the years, the march saw a considerable increase in attendance. The 2002 edition had 1,500 people, and by 2010 the number had reached five thousand. In 2017, the march had around 10,000 participants.

In 2019, the Lisbon Municipal Assembly approved a resolution in honor of the twentieth edition of the march, congratulating its organizers and participants and condemning violence and homophobia.

The march was canceled in 2020 due to the COVID-19 pandemic. As a form of support, part of the resources that were going to be used for the 2020 edition were instead directed to creating an emergency support network for LGBT people in need of medicine, food, or shelter, as well as for refugees, sex workers, and Roma. The following year, it was announced that the march would return on June 19, 2021, with biosecurity measures such as mandatory use of face masks and two-meter social distancing. However, it was ultimately decided to cancel the march again upon recommendation from the authorities.

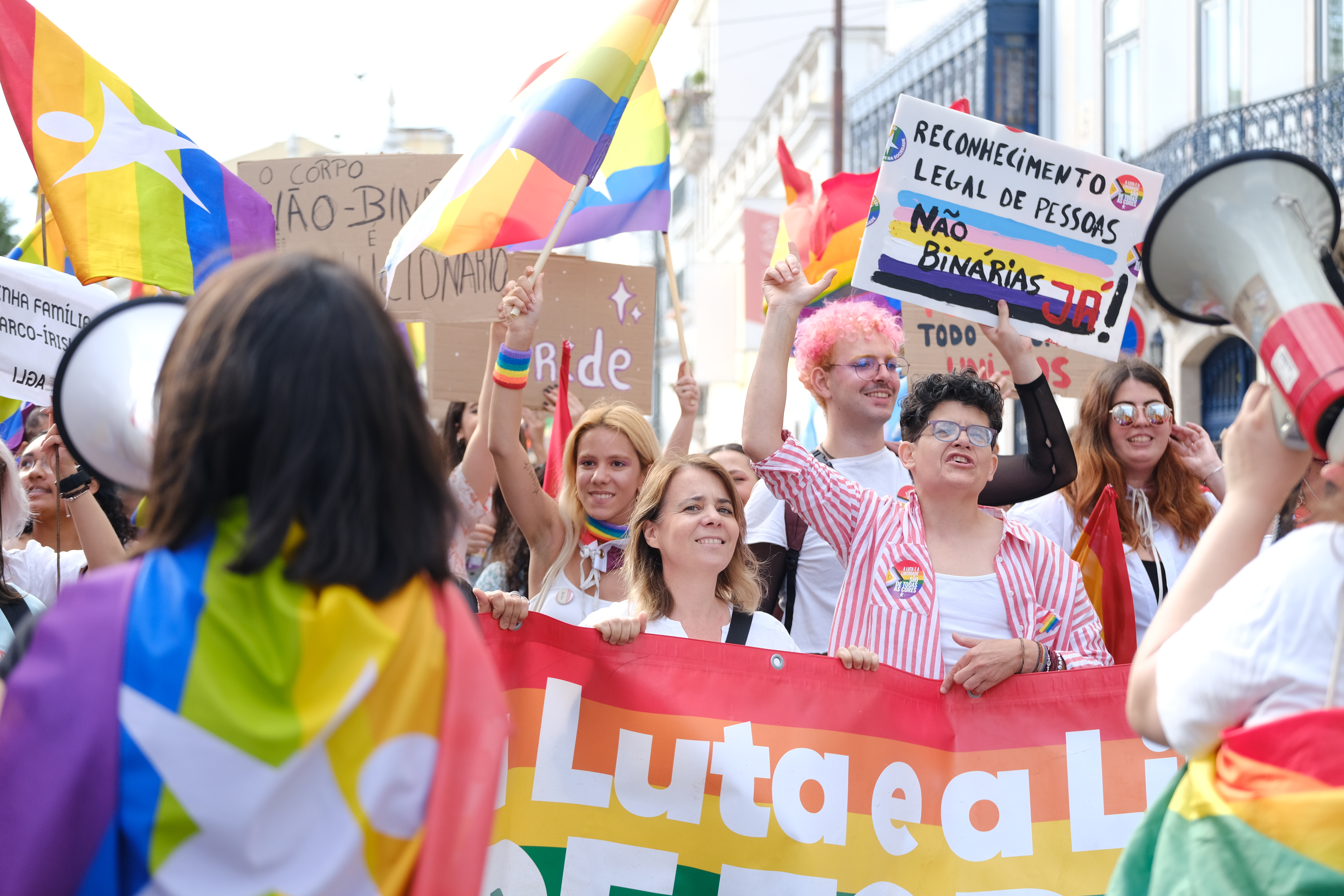
Participants of the 2022 edition.

The march returned in 2022 and reached an attendance of 25,000 people. The following year, the starting point was changed to the Jardim do Príncipe Real, aiming to improve accessibility for people in wheelchairs. As in previous years, the march concluded at Ribeira das Naus.

== See also ==
- Porto Pride
- Lisbon Gay & Lesbian Film Festival
