= Achromatic =

Achromatic means literally “without color”. It may refer to:

- Achromatic colors, “greys” or “neutral colors”, also black or white
- Achromatic lens, a lens designed to minimize chromatic aberration
- Achromatic vision:
  - Monochromacy (total color blindness)
  - Achromatopsia
- Monochrome (disambiguation)
