= Black on white =

Black on white may refer to:

- Black on White (1943 film), German/Austrian film
- Black on White (1968 film), Finnish film
- "Black on White" (Magnum, P.I.), a 1982 television episode
- Dark mode
- Black-on-white ware, design style employed in Pueblo pottery in the Southwest United States

== See also ==
- Black or White (disambiguation)
- Black and White (disambiguation)
