= A Black and White Night =

A Black and White Night may refer to:

- Roy Orbison and Friends: A Black and White Night, a television special featuring Roy Orbison
- A Black & White Night Live, an album by Roy Orbison

== See also ==
- Black and White (disambiguation)
