= Lazarim =

- Civil parish
- Location in Portugal
- Coordinates: 41.015°N 7.851°W
- Country: Portugal
- Region: Norte
- Intermunic. comm.: Douro
- District: Viseu
- Municipality: Lamego

Area
  - Total: 16.54 km^{2} (6.39 sq mi)

Population (2011)
  - Total: 521
  - Density: 31.5/km^{2} (81.6/sq mi)
- Time zone: UTC+00:00 (WET)
  - Summer (DST): UTC+01:00 (WEST)

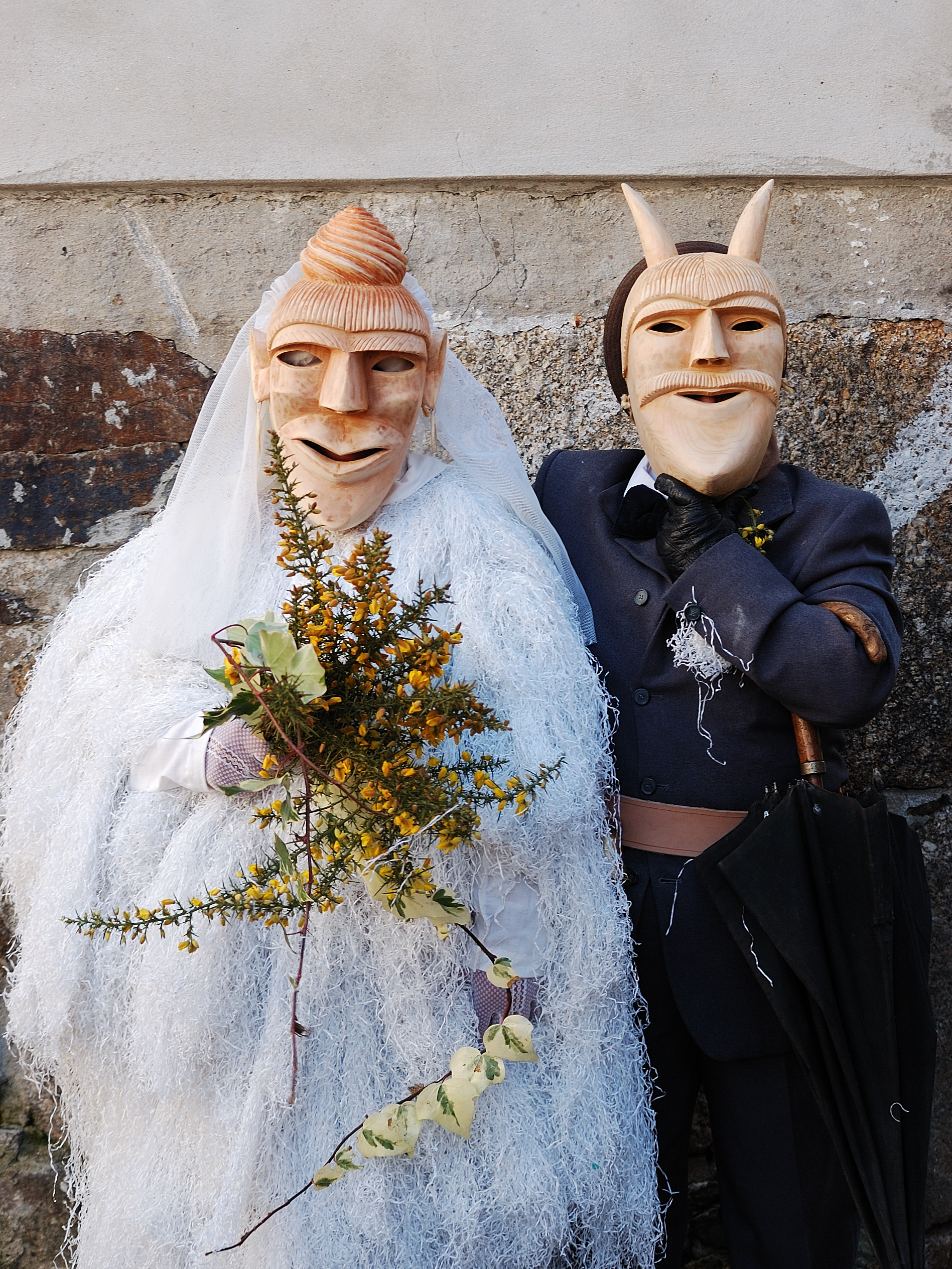
Carnival being celebrated in Lazarim

Lazarim is a town in Portugal. It is a parish of Lamego Municipality. The population in 2011 was 521, in an area of 16.54 km^{2}.

== Shrovetide of Lazarim ==
In Lazarim, Carnival is celebrated, which is considered one of the most traditional Shrovetides in Portugal.

The tradition is characterized by the Caretos, an ethnographic parade, and satirical testaments, in a licentiousness coming from times when everything was lived in clandestinity, confronting the institutional and religious authority in force.

The Caretos wear alder wood masks.
