= Careto =

Folk tradition practiced in Portugal

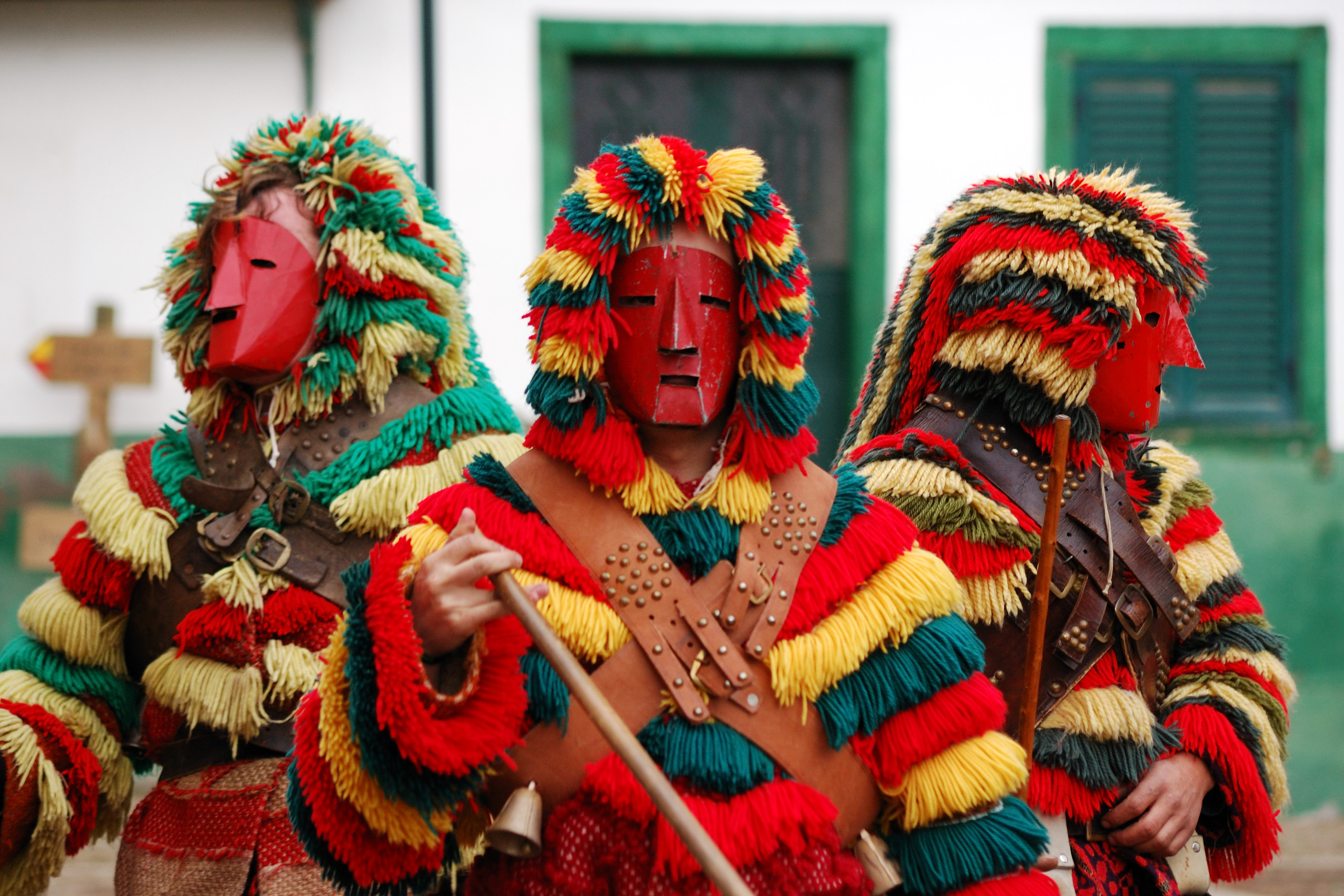
Three caretos in the Carnival at Podence

The Careto tradition is a folk ritual practice of the Trás-os-Montes e Alto Douro region of Portugal, believed to have prehistoric roots in Celtic traditions. The Careto is a masked character garbed with colorful fringe and noisemaking rattles. Part of the observance of Entrudo, marking the end of the Winter season, the Careto tradition is among the oldest continually practiced in Portugal.

Currently integrated with Carnival festivities, the Careto tradition has survived in the Bragança District, particularly the villages of Podence in Macedo de Cavaleiros, Ousilhão and Vila Boa de Ousilhão in Vinhais, and Varge in Aveleda, among others. Careto rituals practiced in the village of Lazarim (Lamego, Viseu District) may have later origins.

In 2019 the Carnival of Podence was inscribed on the UNESCO Intangible Cultural Heritage of Humanity.

== Origins ==
The Caretos tradition is thought to have Celtic roots, from a pre-Roman period. It is probably related to the existence of the Gallaeci and Bracari peoples in Galicia and northern Portugal.

The origin of the masked people is linked to the cult of ancestors, considered privileged holders of powers over the essential bases of the individual's survival on the physical and mental plane, ensuring the fertility of the fields, the fecundity of men and animals, the maintenance of civic law and moral, and the origin modeled and established by them. The masked assumes himself as the central character, around which all the festive action unfolds, playing the most varied roles, depending on the tradition and ritual of each place.

The mask is an element that, temporally and spatially, knows an enormous representation and a universalism that no other material testimony of human culture equals. Through it, the world of gods and the dead is temporarily established among men - it embodies the principle of the game of life.

The solstice rites are those that the masked men celebrate during the twelve-day cycle, at first, Christmas and Santo Estêvão – winter solstice, and at a second moment, Carnival, coming sequentially from the first, through symbolic rites, in very similar ways. by moving celebrations from the solstice to the vernal equinox. The masquerade parties are rites of the deepest esotericism and symbolism that have resisted the passage of time and are still very much alive in the culture of the people of the Nordeste Transmontano region.

== Costume ==
The costume of the Careto, as a rule, is made of home-made quilts, decorated with red wool weave, consisting of a hooded jacket and trousers, covered with thick fringes of coloured wool. Recently, they use overalls that are covered with fringed rows of fabric in bright and contrasting colours such as red, yellow and green. The Caretos wear a mask made of brass, leather, or wood, painted with vivid colours such as red, yellow or black, and a salient nose.

In some regions, the suit is completed with cattle collars equipped with bells, worn over the shoulder, a wide belt with a string of rattles to “rattle” the women in a provocative attitude with an obscure sense of fertility.

In Lazarim, the mask is made of alder wood decorated with horns and other accessories.

== Tradition ==
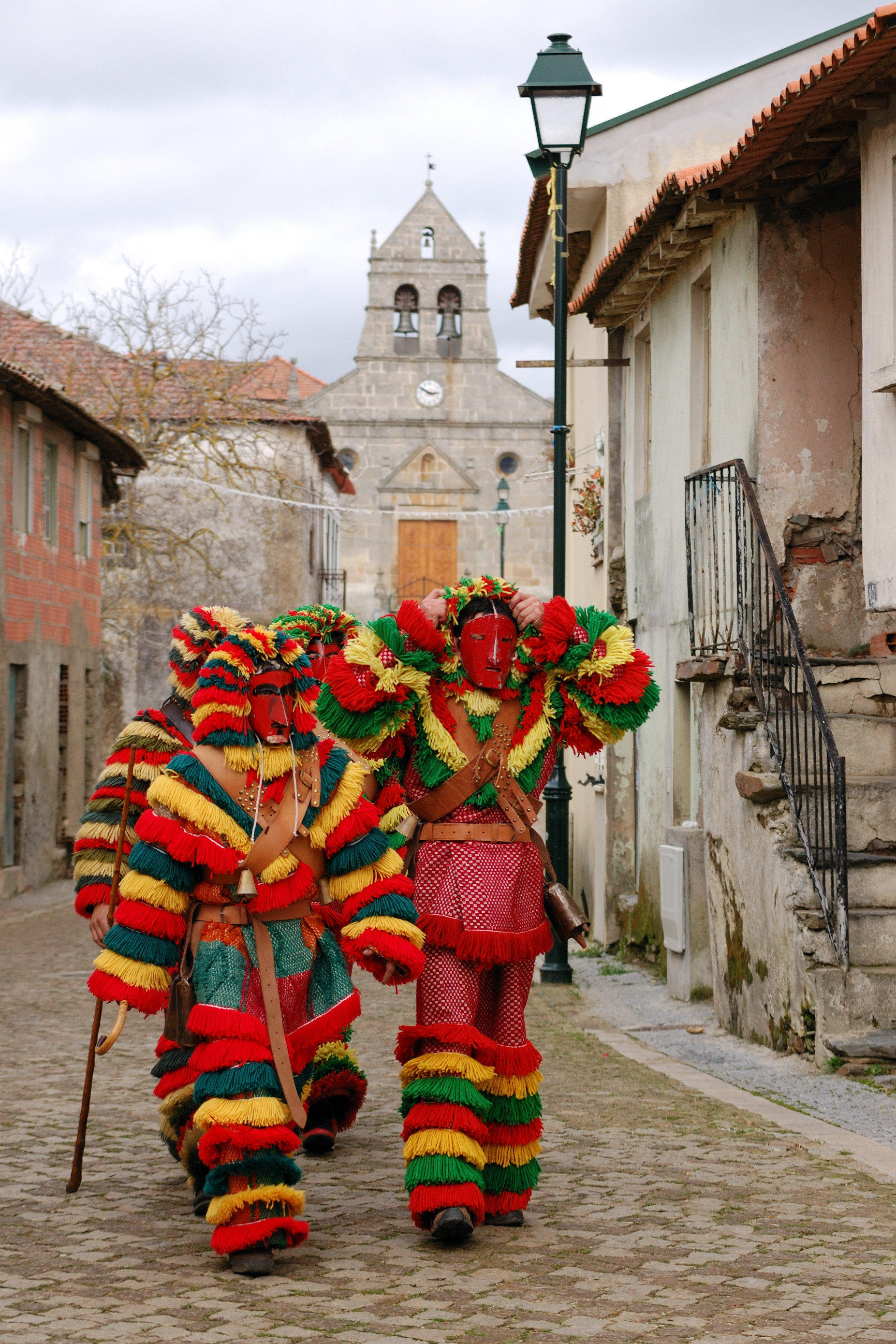
Caretos on the "hunt" for single woman.

The Caretos party is part of an age-old tradition that is celebrated in Portugal on Shrovetide. In Trás-os-Montes it is celebrated in several villages in the municipalities of Vinhais, Bragança, Macedo de Cavaleiros (especially Podence) and Vimioso, and in the Alto Douro in Lazarim in the municipality of Lamego.

In winter, at sunset, a festive season begins in the region of Trás-os-Montes that goes on until Carnival, full of moments of fun that stir up the streets of cities and villages. It is a time of celebration that symbolizes rejuvenation and the beginning of a new cycle, both in nature and in social life.

A large part of these festivities, which still exist in small towns in Portugal and Spain, are particularly popular during the period known as the “Cycle of the 12 days”, which runs from Christmas to the Epiphany (Twelfth Day). At these festivities, young people have, similar to what happened in some civilizations of antiquity, to show evidence that they are able to take on a more active role in the life of the communities in which they are inserted, since among the elderly and children, they are the strongest element. Thus, these celebrations are also manifestations of social cohesion.

The Feast of Boys, which is also called Feast of Santo Estêvão, is probably the most important. It is a tradition that originates from ancient rituals of passage from adolescence to adulthood. Early in the morning, the boys parade through the streets with the typical colorful costumes and Caretos, provoking, rattling and interacting with the population, in great revelry. Also, the Feast of the Kings (or Epiphany), despite being associated with the birth of Jesus Christ, continues, in many villages, to be celebrated with the presence of these masked boys.

The Shrovetide Chocalheiro is the pinnacle of irreverent manifestations that at this time are not only allowed, but also constitute an attraction and make news. In some areas of the region, it is on this day that the masked figures of Death, the Devil and the Censorship take to the streets, committing the most diverse misdeeds. Shrove Tuesday and the prior Sunday are the days when the Caretos are most active. They appear in groups from every corner of the village running and shouting excitedly, frightening the people and “robbing” all the wineries. The main target of these masquerade groups are single young women, who make them climb to the top of walls and verandas.

A little throughout the region of Trás-os-Montes and Alto Douro, this is a time of celebration announced by the sound of the bagpipes of the rounds, it is the time of processions, loas, community meals and collections.

Scholars associate the Careto tradition with memories of magical practices related to agrarian fertility cults.

== Facanito ==
The Facanito is a child who disguises himself as a “Careto” and tries to imitate the Caretos in their merrymaking, fulfilling his own initiation ritual and ensuring the continuity of tradition.

In the Middle Ages in Trás-os-Montes it was referred to as a "little devil that feeds on ground steel". In Miranda do Douro, it is the name given to a man of small stature with a provocative air and it is also the name given to a mythological being, very small and restless.
