= Black or White (disambiguation) =

"Black or White" is a 1991 single by American singer Michael Jackson.

Black or White may also refer to:

- Black or White (film), a 2014 American drama film
- "Black or White" (Steve Harley & Cockney Rebel song), a 1975 song by British rock band Steve Harley & Cockney Rebel
- "Black or White", a song by Dreamcatcher from Dystopia: The Tree of Language

== See also ==
- Black-or-white fallacy, a type of false dilemma
- Black or white thinking or splitting, in psychology
- Black and White (disambiguation)
- Black on white (disambiguation)
