= BVV =

BVV may refer to:

- IATA code for Burevestnik Airport
- Big Van Vader (1955–2018), American professional wrestler and gridiron football player
- Brno Exhibition Centre, Czech: Brněnské výstaviště
- BVV Barendrecht, an association football club in Barendrecht, Netherlands

== See also ==
- BW (disambiguation)
