= Chromate =

Chromate or chromat, and their derived terms, may refer to:

== Chemistry ==
- Chromate and dichromate family of ions, including monochromate, dichromate, trichromate, and tetrachromate
- Chromate conversion coating, a method for passivating metals

== Biology ==
- Monochromacy (monochromate) having one color vision
- Dichromatism (dichromate) having two color vision
- Trichromacy (trichromate) having three color vision
- Trichrome staining, a staining method
- Tetrachromacy (tetrachromate) having four color vision

== Other ==
- Chromat, a fashion label
- Monochromatic or monochrome, images composed of one color (or values of one color)

== See also ==
- Chromite, a chromium-containing mineral
- Chromite (compound), chemical compounds containing the (CrO_{2})^{−} anion
- Chrome (disambiguation)
