= Festivals of Póvoa de Varzim =

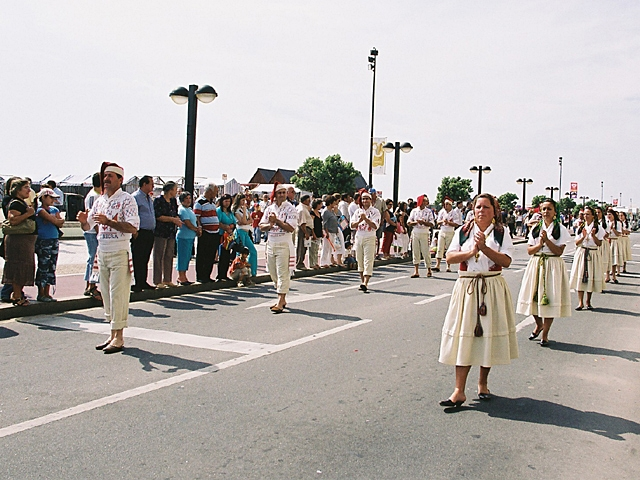
Traditional festival dress during a parade in Avenida dos Banhos.

There are several religious or popular celebrations (the Festa), pilgrimages (romarias) and processions (procissão) in Póvoa de Varzim, Portugal. Most of these festivals occur around the Holy Week or during the summer.

== Festival of Saint Peter ==
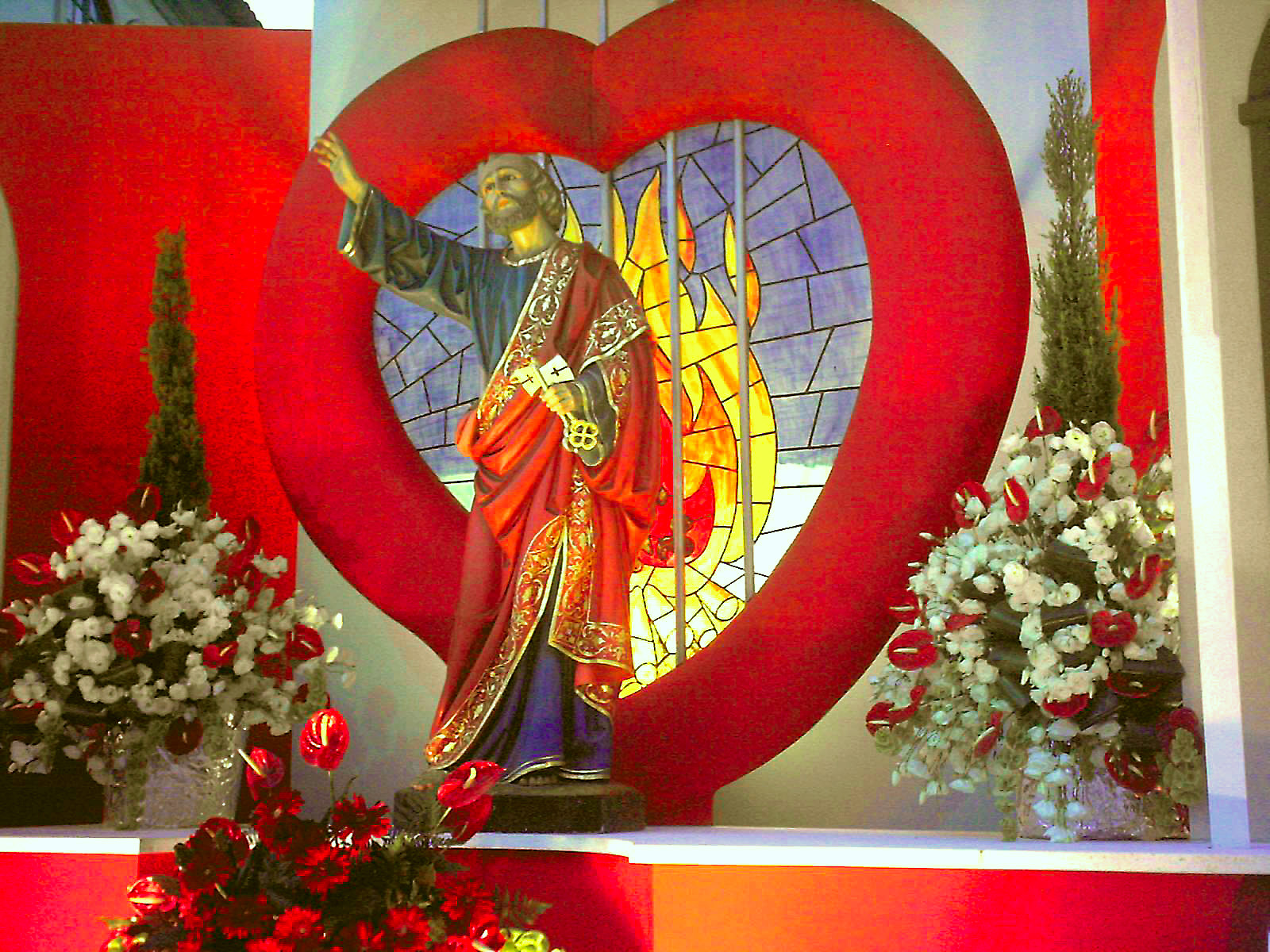
Throne of Saint Peter of Matriz Neighbourhood for the festivities of the year 2005.

The city's municipal holiday is June 29, Saint Peter's day (Dia de São Pedro), the fisherman saint and the popular patron saint of the city. The Saint Peter festivities stopped in 1892, due to the fishing tragedy that year, but in 1962, the City Hall tried to revive the tradition, and the festival recovered with great success and became the main celebration of the city. In 1974, when the government authorized local holidays, the city hall declared it the municipal holiday.

Around this date, the neighbourhood windows are decorated; and, on the night of 28th to 29th the population gets together in celebration, dancing and eating by the light of fires (fogueiras). The traditional neighbourhoods compete in the "rusgas" (a sort of carnival) and the creation of thrones to Saint Peter. This festival is very important and rivals Christmas and Easter as the event of the year.

The neighbourhoods competing in the rusgas are Bairro Norte, Bairro Sul, Bairro de Belém, Bairro da Mariadeira, Bairro da Matriz, and Bairro Regufe. The most popular are Norte, Sul and Matriz; but the greatest competition is between Norte (north) and Sul (south). The supporters live not only in the geographical area of the neighbourhood but stretch throughout the city and bordering areas. These days, the population behaves very much like football supporters, and occasionally there are some disturbances when fans defend their preferred neighbourhood; but the competition is usually very healthy. Families, having previously emigrated to the United States and beyond, have been known to come back to Povoa, time and again, simply to relish the spectacular feelings of excitement and community present at this festival.

== Carnival ==
Carnival is a traditional festival in Póvoa de Varzim with the old Carnival Balls, masked people gathering in Rua da Junqueira until the late 1970s which led to the 1980s expensive carnival parades in the waterfront. The remains of such organized events are now celebrated spontaneously by the common people who gather for a parade in Avenida dos Banhos. Despite not having any sort of advertising or media coverage, Póvoa's "Spontaneous Carnival" (Carnaval dos espontâneos) started to attract thousands of people.

== Easter and Anjo ==
Easter Monday or Anjo Festival is considered to be the second "municipal holiday". The populace works on Good Friday (national holiday) to have Monday free to picnic, a remnant of a pagan festival, formerly called "Festa da Hera" (The Ivy Festival). The local companies follow this tradition and are open on Friday and closed on Monday.

The tradition has quickly transferred to neighbouring cities. Easter Sunday is the day of blessing of the homes by the compasso, a group of church members that take the cross of Christ to every home with an open door. On this day, godchildren visit their godparents and different families compete in the Péla, a traditional local game that is played while the population awaits the visit of the compasso.

== Fishing festivals ==
On August 15 there is the Feast of the Assumption, devotion of Póvoa's fishermen, this is one of the largest festivals of this kind in Portugal, the procession is headed by the Archbishop of Braga and the pinnacle of the procession occurs in front of the seaport, where fireworks are launched from carefully arranged boats.

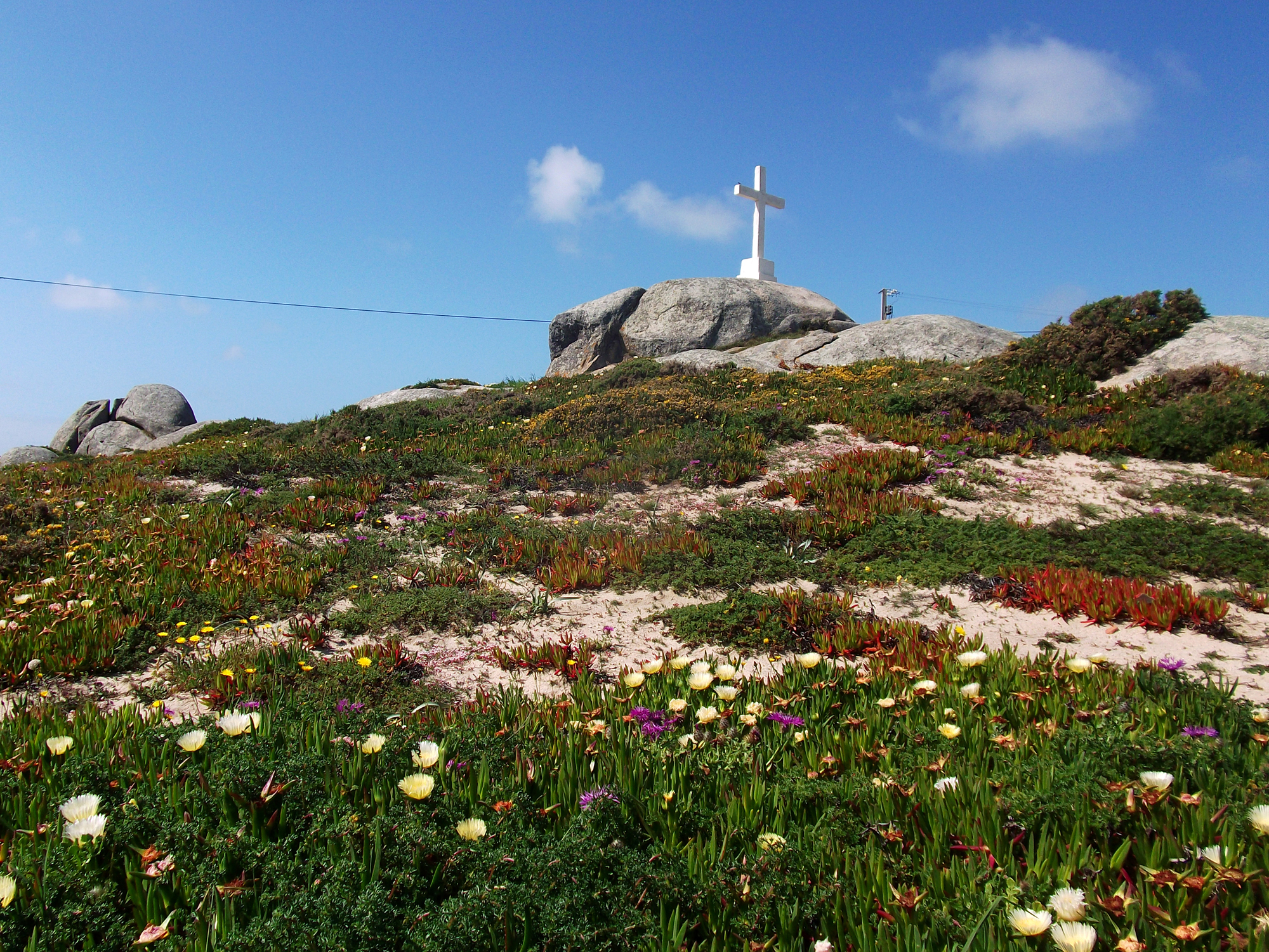
Saint's Rock. Near the rock, the Santo André Chapel was built in the 16th century; however, this place shows evidence the work of man since, at least, the Roman era.

Two fishing pilgrimages (romarias) are peculiar, as these are associated with the landscape: the Nossa Senhora da Saúde Pilgrimage from the First Church (Igreja Matriz) to Nossa Senhora da Saúde Chapel in the base of São Félix hill, and Santo André Pilgrimage, that goes along the beach to Santo André Chapel.

São Félix is a reference point for fishermen at sea and of historical importance. On the last Sunday of May, the Pilgrimage of Nossa Senhora da Saúde (Our Lady of Health) covers a distance of 7 kilometres (4.25 mi) between the Igreja Matriz of Póvoa de Varzim and the Nossa Senhora da Saúde Chapel, at the foot of São Félix. Mostly, the worshippers of this saint make promises, notably fishermen of the municipalities of Póvoa de Varzim and Vila do Conde.

Near Cape Santo André, there is a rocky formation known as Penedo do Santo (Saint's Rock), which has a mark that the Poveiro fishermen believe to be a footprint of Saint Andrew (Santo André). They still believe that this saint is the Boatman of Souls and that he frees the souls of those whom drown in the sea, fishing them from the depths of the ocean after a shipwreck. The celebration of Saint Andrew occurs on the dawn of the last day of November, when groups of men and women, wearing black hoods and holding lamps, go to the chapel via the beach, singing and in the end surround the chapel, forming the Ponto das Almas (Souls' Point).

== Fairs ==
In the last fortnight of September, during the Senhora das Dores festival there is the typical Senhora das Dores Pottery Fair, with many different tents, installed in the plaza near the Senhora das Dores Church, which sell diverse wares of special traditional Portuguese pottery. These feasts have roots in 1768, year when an icon of Mary was placed in the old Chapel of Senhor do Monte. The followers of the sect originated the annual party, procession and fair.

The HortiPóvoa - the horticultural Fair of Póvoa de Varzim takes place during the summer in Aguçadoura. Every week, on Sundays, there is the Estela Fair, which is a market dedicated to trade of vegetables. Recently, other annual fairs had been established: the Milk Agricultural Fair in São Pedro de Rates, with regional products, such as dairy products, sweets, honey, cured meats, wines and olive oil; the Horse Fair in Terroso where, besides trading, it is possible to attend horse shows.

Still, there are other weekly fairs: the Moninhas fair (Monday) and Aver-o-Mar fair (Sunday morning), and also the Antiques Fair, in Praça do Almada, that occurs every second Sunday of the month.

== Festivals calendar ==
| Date | Event | Local name | Neighbourhood/Parish and observations |
|---|---|---|---|
| January * | Feast of Saint Sebastian | Festa de São Sebastião | Balasar |
| February 2 | Feast of Lady of Candeias | Festa da Senhora das Candeias | Terroso |
| February 3 | Feast of São Brás | Festa de São Brás | Bairro de Regufe |
| Saturday * | Procession of Lights | Procissão das Lanternas | City. Passion Saturday. |
| Sunday * | Procession of Steps | Procissão dos Passos | City and Amorim. Passion Sunday. |
| Sunday * | Palm Procession and Lord of the Steps | Procissão de Ramos e Senhor dos Passos | Palm procession and first visit of godchildren to their godparents delivering flowers and palms. Feast of Lord of the Steps in Rates. |
| Friday * | Procession of Lord's Burial | Procissão do Enterro do Senhor | National holiday. City. On the night between Thursday and Friday in Holy Week. |
| Sunday * | Easter | Páscoa | Procession of the resurrection and the second visit of godchildren to their godparents, gaining a present from them. |
| Monday * | Angel Day | Dia do Anjo | Easter Monday. Picnic day, the population meets in Argivai. |
| Sunday * | Feast of Lord of Good Success | Festa do Senhor do Bom Sucesso | Argivai. First Sunday after Easter. |
| Sunday * | Procession of Lady of Desterro | Procissão Senhora do Desterro | Bairro Norte. 15 days after Easter. |
| Thursday * | Ascension Day | Corpo de Deus | National holiday. (40 days after Easter). Feast and procession in the city and Rates. |
| Sunday * | Feast of Lord of Miracles | Festa do Senhor dos Milagres | Argivai. 6th Sunday after Easter and Ascension Sunday. |
| Sunday * | Feast of Saint Gonçalo | Festa de São Gonçalo | Beiriz. Sunday and Monday following the seventh Sunday after Easter. |
| April 26 | Saint Peter of Rates | São Pedro de Rates | Rates |
| last Sunday of May | Feast of Lady of Health | Festa da Senhora da Saúde | Pilgrimage from the First Church to Mount São Félix |
| June 13 | Feasts of Saint Anthony | Festas de Santo António | Bairro da Matriz, Amorim and Rates |
| June 29 | Feasts of Saint Peter | Festas de São Pedro | Municipal holiday. Patron Saint of Póvoa de Varzim |
| First Sunday of July | Feasts of Saint Thomas and Lady of Relief | Festas de São Tomé e Senhora do Alívio | Estela |
| July * | Procession of Lady of Bethlehem | Procissão da Senhora de Belém | Belém |
| July * | Feast of Lord of the Appeared Cross | Festa do Senhor da Cruz Aparecida | Balasar. Two in two years. |
| July 25 | Feast of Lady of the Good Travel | Festa da Senhora da Boa Viagem | Aguçadoura |
| August 7 | Feast of Lady of Neves | Festa da Senhora das Neves | Aver-o-Mar. Occurs on the nearest Sunday to this day. |
| August 15 | Procession of Lady of Assumption | Procissão da Senhora da Assunção | National holiday. Bairro Sul |
| 1st Sunday of September | Feast of Saint Félix | Festa de São Félix | Saint Félix Mount, Laundos |
| September * | Procession of Lord of Bonfim | Procissão do Senhor do Bonfim | Nova Sintra, Bairro da Matriz |
| September 15 | Feast of Lady of Pains | Festa da Senhora das Dores | Festival and fair near Nossa Senhora das Dores Church |
| September 29 | Feast of Saint Michael | Festa de São Miguel | Laundos |
| October * | Procession of Lady of Rosary | Procissão da Senhora do Rosário | Póvoa de Varzim |
| November 1 | All Saints Day | Dia de Todos-os-santos | National holiday. Procession and visit to deceased relatives in the cemetery. |
| November 30 | Feast of Saint Andrew | Festa de Santo André | Pilgrimage throughout the beach to Santo André Chapel in Aver-o-Mar |
| December 8 | Immaculate Conception of the Castle | Nossa Senhora da Conceição do Castelo | National holiday. Procession to Póvoa de Varzim's fortress on the seventh day at night. |
| December 13 | Feast of Saint Luzia | Festa de Santa Luzia | Navais |

* date varies.
