= Chromite (compound) =

Chemical compound

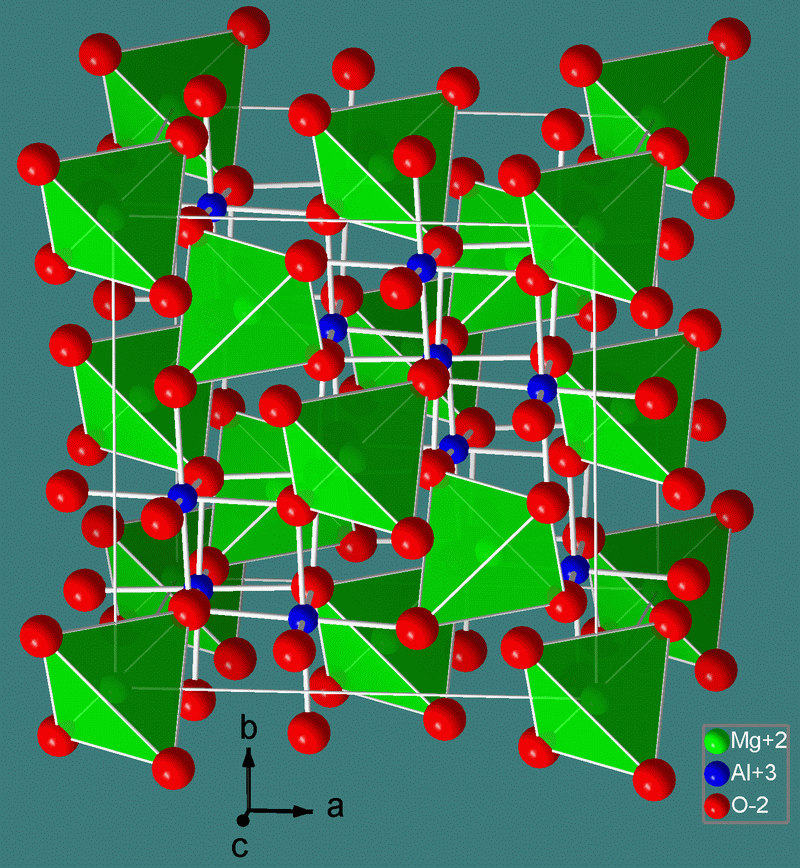
Crystal structure of spinel

In chemistry the term chromite has been used in two contexts. Under IUPAC naming conventions, chromate(III) is preferred to chromite.

1. For compounds containing an oxyanion of chromium in oxidation state of +3
2. For other compounds of chromium(III) as a means of distinguishing a chemical species such as hexacyanochromite(III). [Cr(CN)_{6}]^{3−} from an analogous compound in which chromium is a different oxidation state.

The mineral chromite is an iron chromium oxide with empirical formula FeCr_{2}O_{4}. Structurally, it belongs to the spinel group. Magnesium can substitute for iron in variable amounts as it forms a solid solution with magnesiochromite (MgCr_{2}O_{4});. Zincochromite is another example. The crystal structure of the acid, HCrO_{2} has been determined by neutron diffraction.

Chromites may be formed by reaction of chromium(III) oxide with a metal oxide:

Cr_{2}O_{3} + MgO → MgCr_{2}O_{4}
