= Bra & Wessels =

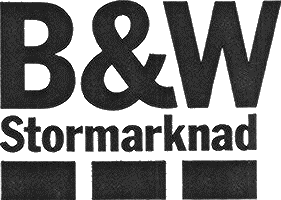
Bra & Wessels logo

B&W (Bra & Wessels) was a chain of Swedish department stores founded in 1977 by a merger of Wessels and Bra. The chain was bought by KF (Kooperativa Förbundet) in 1990 and in 2001 renamed as Coop Forum.
