= Bandwidth =

Bandwidth commonly refers to:

- Bandwidth (signal processing) (AKA analog bandwidth, frequency bandwidth, or radio bandwidth), a measure of the width of a frequency range
- Bandwidth (computing), the rate of data transfer, bit rate or throughput
- Spectral linewidth, the width of an atomic or molecular spectral line

Bandwidth may also refer to:

== Mathematics ==
- Bandwidth (linear algebra), the width of the non-zero terms around the diagonal of a matrix
- Kernel density estimation, the width of the convolution kernel used in statistics
- Graph bandwidth, in graph theory

== Technology ==
- Coherence bandwidth, a frequency range over which a channel can be considered "flat"
- Power bandwidth, a frequency range for which power output of an amplifier exceeds a given fraction of full rated power

== Other uses ==
- Bandwidth (company), an American communications provider
- Bandwidth (radio program), a Canadian music talk show
- Bandwidth, a normative expected range of linguistic behavior in language expectancy theory
- Bandwidth, a business term for how much tasking someone can take on, or conversely, how much effort a project requires

== See also ==
- Band (disambiguation)
- Width (disambiguation)
- Bandlimiting
