= Olhares do Mediterrâneo - Cinema no Feminino =

International film festival of films made by Mediterranean women directors

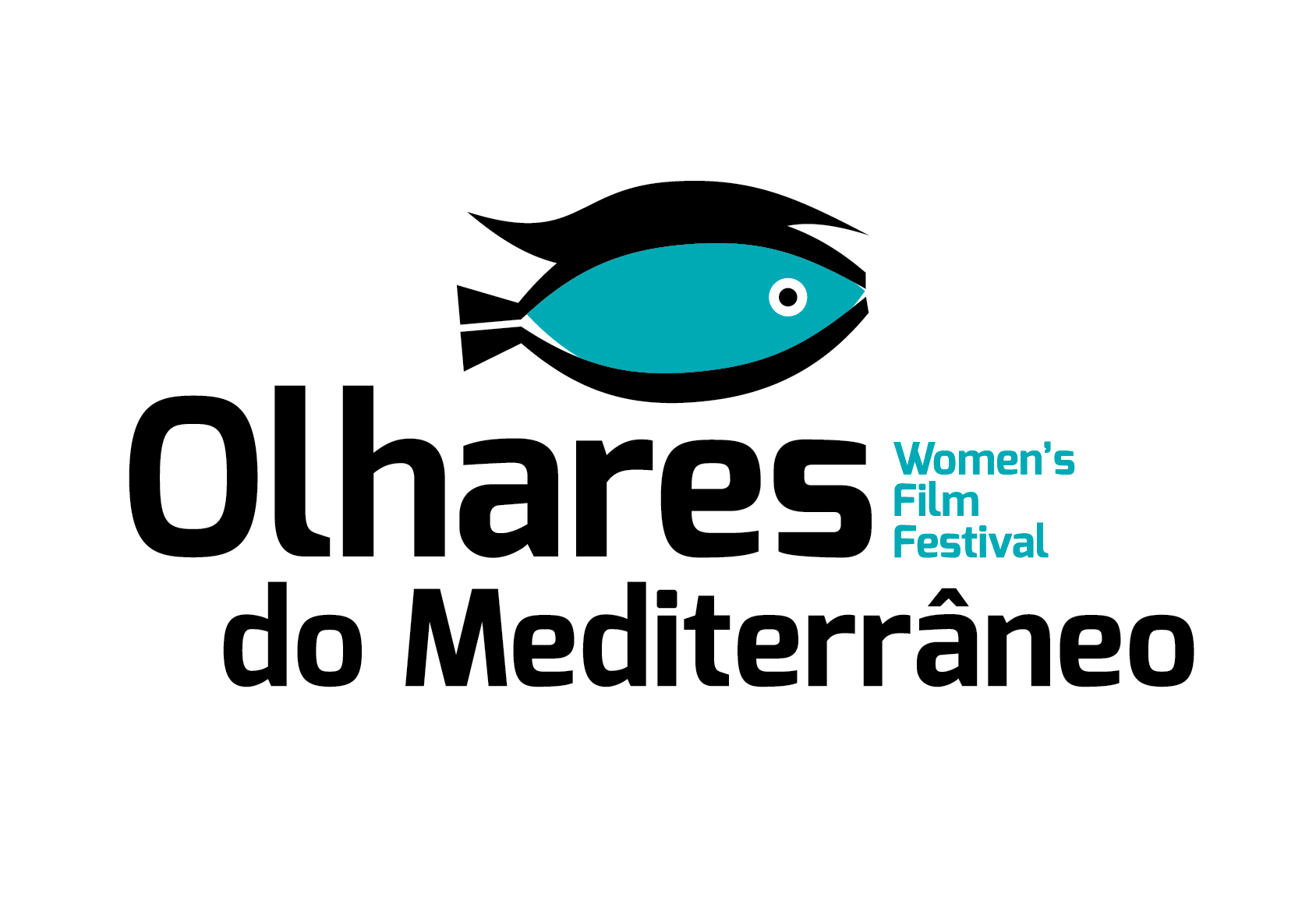

Olhares do Mediterrâneo - Women's Film Festival is an international film festival of films made by Mediterranean women directors. The 8th edition of the Festival took place in Lisbon, Portugal, on November 10-14 2021, at Cinema São Jorge.

Apart from the films, the Festival offers a diversity of cultural activities that take place during the whole festival at the same venue. A call to submissions for the 9th edition will be between Feb 15 and April 30.

After a successful first edition, in 2014, the film festival made an upgrade and took it to the competitive level.

In 2019, the Festival changed its name (and logo) to OLHARES DO MEDITERRÂNEO – WOMEN'S FILM FESTIVAL

== 2021 winners ==
The winners of the 8th edition of Olhares do Mediterrâneo – Women's Film Festival in 2021 were:

→Jury award

- Best Feature Film: First Year Out | PREMIÈRE ANNÉE DEHORS, JOURNAL DE BORD |||| by Valérie Manns |||| França • Doc • 2019 • 71’
- Honorable Mention: ELAS TAMBÉM ESTIVERAM LÁ | THEY WERE THERE TOO |||| Joana Craveiro |||| Portugal • Doc • 2021 • 105’
- Honorable Mention: ESTHER FERRER. THREADS OF TIME | ESTHER FERRER. HILOS DE TIEMPO |||| Josu Rekalde |||| Espanha • Doc • 2020 • 69’
- Best Short Film in ex-aequo: FERROTIPOS |||| Nüll García |||| Espanha • Fic • 2019 • 14’ and THE BATH |||| Anissa Daoud |||| Tunísia, França • Fic • 2020 • 16’

→Travessias Award

- Best Film in ex-aequo: NHA MILA |||| Denise Fernandes |||| Portugal, Suíça • Fic • 2020 • 18’ and WE ARE NOT DEAD YET | NOUS NE SOMMES PAS ENCORE MORTS |||| Joanne Rakotoarisoa |||| França • Fic • 2020 • 34’

→Começar a Olhar (School films)

- Best Film: IN THE WOODS | U ŠUMI |||| Sara Grgurić |||| Croácia • Fic • 2020 • 17’
- Honorable Mention: FERRY TALE |||| Michal Shanny & Quan Nguyen Hong |||| Roménia • Doc • 2020 • 18’
- Honorable Mention: The Ducks | LOS PATOS |||| Ángela Arregui Chavarría |||| Espanha • Anim • 2021 • 7’

→Audience Award

- Best Film: Teenage Lockdown Tales | MES 15 ANS DANS MA CHAMBRE |||| Marie Pierre Jaury & Charlotte Ballet-Baz |||| França • Doc • 2020 • 52’
- Best Short Film: POÉTICAS DO CANTO POLIFÓNICO |||| Maria do Rosário Pestana |||| Portugal • Doc • 2019 • 29’

The awards were made by the students of António Arroio, a Secondary Art School, in Lisbon

== 2020 winners ==
The winners of the 7th edition of Olhares do Mediterrâneo – Women's Film Festival in 2020 were:

→Jury award

- Best Feature Film: WHEN LOVE IS ALL YOU HAVE | QUE L’AMOUR, by Laetitia Mikles | França, Doc, 2020, 80’
- Honorable Mention: BETWEEN HEAVEN AND EARTH | BAYN AL JANAA WA AL ARD, by Najwa Najjar | Palestina, Luxemburgo, Islândia, Fic, 2019, 95’
- Best Short Film: MATRIOCHKAS, by Bérangère McNeese | Bélgica, França, Fic, 2019, 24’
- Honorable Mention: EXTRA SAFE, by Nouran Sherif | Egipto, Fic, 2019, 9’
- Honorable Mention: THE GOLDEN AGE | L’AGE D’OR, by Eric Minh Cuong Castaing | França, Exp, 2018, 21’
- Honorable Mention: THE LOAD | IL FAGOTTO, by Giulia Giapponesi |Itália, Fic, 2019, 15’

→Travessias Award

- Best Film: #387 | DISPARU EN MEDITERRANÉE, by Madeleine Leroyer | França, Bélgica, Itália, Doc, 2019, 61’
- Honorable Mention: A FISH TALE, by Emmanuelle Mayer | Israel, Doc, 2019, 52’

→Começar a Olhar (School films)

- Best Film: STEPLESS, by Nadège Jankowicz | Portugal, Alemanha, Anim, 2019, 3’
- Honorable Mention: CINDY, by Shemer Gaon Baraba | Israel, Fic, 2019, 16’
- Honorable Mention: SONDER, by Ana Monteiro | Portugal, Polónia, Doc, 2020, 10’
- Honorable Mention: STILL LIFE, by Francisca de Abreu Coutinho | Portugal, Anim, 2018, 4’

Due to the pandemics of Covid19, there was no Audience Award in 2020

The awards were made by the students of António Arroio, a Secondary Art School, in Lisbon

== 2019 winners ==
The winners of the 6th edition of Olhares do Mediterrâneo – Women's Film Festival in 2019 were:

→Jury award

- Best Feature Film: VIA SAN CIPRIANO | San Cipriano Road, by Lea Schlude (Itália), Italy, Germany, doc, 2019, 67’
- Honorable Mention: PUTA MINA | Damn Mine, BY Colectivo Puta Mina, Spain, doc, 2018, 59’
- Best Short Film: BLACK MAMBA by Amel Guellaty, Tunisia, fic, 2017, 20’
- Honorable Mention: NON È AMORE QUESTO, by Teresa Sala, Italy, doc-fic, 2018, 33’

→Travessias Award

- Best Film: STRANGE FISH, by Giulia Bertoluzzi, Italy, doc, 2018, 55’
- Honorable Mention: PARADISE WITHOUT PEOPLE, by Francesca Trianni, Greece, Estonia, Germany, doc, 2018, 80’
- Honorable Mention: SHADOW, by Zeina Qahwaji (Syria), Belgium, doc, 2017, 20’

→Começar a Olhar (School films)

- Best Film: FAMILY IN EXILE, by Fatima Matousse (Morocco), USA, doc, 2018, 15’
- Honorable Mention: ELLA, MUERTA DE FRÍO, YO CALLADA HASTA LOS HUESOS | Frozen to death, Soaked to the Skin, by Elena Tara, Spain, fic, 2019, 13’
- Honorable Mention: SHADOW, by Zeina Qahwaji (Syria), Belgium, doc, 2017, 20’

→Audience Award

- Best Film: STRANGE FISH, by Giulia Bertoluzzi, Italy, doc, 2018, 55’
- Best Short Film: NUDAR, by Rand Beiruty (Jordan), Germany, doc, 2018, 20’

The awards were made by the students of António Arroio, a Secondary Art School, in Lisbon

== 2018 winners ==
The winners of the 5th edition of Olhares do Mediterrâneo – Cinema no Feminino in 2018 were:

→Jury award

- Best Feature Film: RUSH HOUR, by Luciana Kaplan, Turkey/USA/México, documentary, 2017, 80’
- Best Short Film: AREKA | The Ditch, by Atxur Animazio Taldea (colectivo), Begoña Vicario (Coordenação), Spain, animation, 2017, 6’
- Honorable Mention: MARLON, by Jessica Palud, France/Belgium, fiction, 2017, 19’

→Travessias Award

- Best Film: MR GAY SYRIA, by Ayse Toprak, France/Turkey/Germany, documentary, 2017, 84
- Honorable Mention: Avant La Fin De L'été | Before Summer Ends, by Maryam Goormaghtigh, France/ Switzerland, documentary, 2017, 80’

→Começar a Olhar (School films)

- Best Film: LAYLA HASAR SHAHAR | A Night With No Dawn, by Sara Bozakov, Israel, fiction, 2017, 21’
- Honorable Mention: Event Horizon, by Joséfa Celestin, France/Scotland, fiction, 2017, 12’

→Audience Award

- Best Film: MR GAY SYRIA, by Ayse Toprak, France/Turkey/Germany, documentary, 2017, 84
- Best Short Film: IRIOWENIASI. EL HILO DE LA LUNA | Irioweniasi. The Thread of the Moon, by Esperanza Jorge e Inmaculada Antolínez, Morocco/Spain/Nigeria, documentary, 2018, 48’

The awards were made by Sedimento

== 2017 winners= ==
The winners of the 4th edition of Olhares do Mediterrâneo – Cinema no Feminino in 2017 were:

→Jury award

- Best Feature Film: Willy_1er, by Marielle Gautier, Ludovic Boukherma, Zoran Boukherma and Hugo P Thomas, France, fiction, 2016
- Best Short Film: Groundlevel, by Ayris Alptekin, Turkey, fiction, 2016

→Travessias Award

- Best Feature Film (In ex aequo)

The Others, by Ayse Polat Turkey, documentary, 2016 UN PAESE DI CALABRIA, by Shu Aiello and Catherine Catella, France/Italy, documentary, 2016

→Começar a Olhar (School films)

- Best Film: TUTTE LE COSE SONO PIENE DI LEI, by Maria Tilli, Italy, fiction, 2015
- Honorable Mention: EL PESO DE LA MANTA, by Francesca Romana Degl’Innocenti, Aisha Doherty, Julie France, Clelia Goodchild, Leanne Hayman, Becky Lamich, Prunelle Mathet Girardeau, Toulla Mavromati, Cindy Parker, George Brereton, John English, Tom Gardner, David Innes and James Royle, Spain, documentary, 2016
- Honorable Mention: Women of Imetsen, by Hilali Kawtar, Morocco/Switzerland, documentary, 2015

→Audience Award

- Best Film: (In ex aequo)

CAFÉ NAGLER, by Mor Kaplansky and Yariv Barel Israel/Germany, documentary, 2015 80 AND COUNTING, by Lina Chaplin, Israel, documentary, 2016

The awards were made by Joana Toste.

== 2016 winners ==
The winners of the 3rd edition of Olhares do Mediterrâneo – Cinema no Feminino in 2016 were:

→Jury award

- Best Feature Film: LES MESSAGERS, by Hélène Crouzillat and Laetitia Tura, France, documentary, 2014, 70’
- Best Short Film: GUEULE DE LOUP, by Alice Vial, France, fiction, 2014, 24’

→Travessias Award

- Best Film: LUOGHI COMUNI, by Angelo Loy, Italy, documentary, 2015, 75’

→Audience Award

- Best Film: PIRATES OF SALE, by Merième Addou (Morocco) and Rosa Rogers (UK), documentary, 2014, 78’
- Honorable Mention: LES MESSAGERS, by Hélène Crouzillat and Laetitia Tura, France, documentary, 2014, 70’

== 2015 winners ==
The winners of the 2nd edition of Olhares do Mediterrâneo – Cinema no Feminino in 2015 were:

→Jury award

- Best Feature Film: Seaburners, by Melisa Önel, Turkey, fiction, 2014
- Best Short Film: NÃO SÃO FAVAS, SÃO FEIJOCAS, by Tânia Dinis, Portugal, documentary/experimental, 2013
- Honorable Mention: DONA FÚNFIA, by Margarida Madeira, Portugal, animation, 2013

→Audience Award

- Best Film: THIS IS MY LAND, by Tamara Erde, France, documentary, 2014
- Honorable Mention: SIMSHAR, by Rebecca Cremona, Malta, fiction, 2014

The awards were made by Isabel Bernardes da Silva and Thomas Kahrel.

== See also ==
- List of women's film festivals
