= Ousilhão =

Village in Vinhais, Bragança, Portugal

Coordinates: 41°47′32″N 6°57′18″W

- Village
- Interactive map of Ousilhão
- Country: Portugal
- Region: Norte
- District: Bragança
- Municipality: Vinhais

Population (2021)
  - Total: 197
- Figure refers to the civil parish Nunes e Ousilhão.

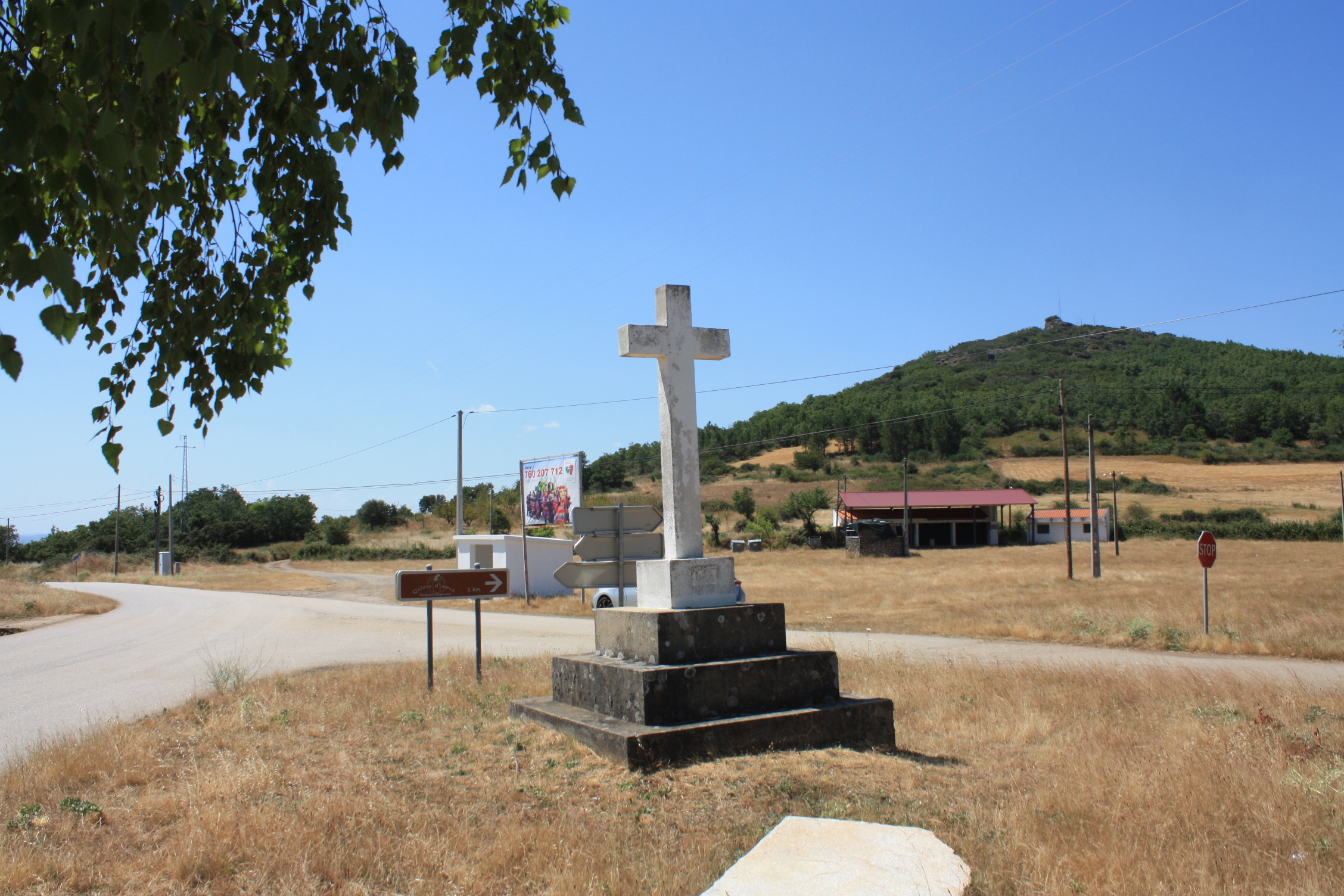
Monte de Santa Comba

Ousilhão is a small village in the municipality of Vinhais, Bragança District, in north-eastern Portugal. It lies around 8 kilometres by road south-east of the town of Vinhais, in the valley of the River Tuela, and is known for the preservation of several local traditions.

Administratively it forms part of the civil parish of Nunes e Ousilhão, which recorded 197 inhabitants at the 2021 census.

Until 2013, Ousilhão was the seat of the civil parish of Ousilhão, which covered an area of 14.86 km^{2} and had 123 inhabitants (2011 Census). As part of the administrative reorganisation of Portuguese parishes in 2013, the parish was dissolved and its territory was incorporated into the newly created Union of the Parishes of Nunes and Ousilhão.

The village of Ousilhão is traditionally divided into seven neighbourhoods: Bairro de Cima (Upper Quarter), Bairro de Baixo (Lower Quarter), Bairro do Campasso (Campasso Quarter), Bairro de Amiã (Amiã Quarter), Bairro de Cabanelas (Cabanelas Quarter), Bairro do Fontão (Fontão Quarter), and Bairro do Campo (Field Quarter).

Bairro de Cima (Upper Quarter) serves as the entrance to the village and is often regarded as its “reception room”, featuring O Campo, the space where some of the most prominent and outward-facing events take place.

Bairro de Baixo (Lower Quarter) is home to a number of community facilities, including the former Parish Council, the Casa do Povo (community hall), the old primary school (now housing the headquarters of the Ousilhão Cultural, Recreational and Sports Association), as well as a café and a small grocery shop.

The parish's main church, the Igreja Matriz (parish church), is located in Bairro do Campasso (Campasso Quarter).

== History ==
Archaeological remains indicate prehistoric occupation at a local hillfort commonly known as "Monte do Castro" (Ousilhão).

The site appears in the national heritage inventory as Monte de Santa Comba, located within the union of the parishes of Nunes e Ousilhão. The area enters written record in 1258, in the royal surveys (Inquirições) of King Afonso III of Portugal.

== Geography ==
Ousilhão stands in the uplands of Trás-os-Montes, in a landscape characterised by pastures (lameiros), chestnut groves and river valleys.

The village occupies southern slopes near the Tuela, within the wider Montesinho–Nogueira area.

== Culture and traditions ==
The most distinctive local celebration is the Festa dos Rapazes e de Santo Estêvão, held annually on the 25th and the 26th of December, featuring masked participants, rounds through the village accompanied by bagpipes, and a religious procession in honour of Saint Stephen.

This festivity preserves elements of ancient Celtic winter solstice rites, such as the use of masks, disguises, and ritual performances marking the passage into the new year. Over centuries, these pre-Christian practices were gradually integrated into Catholic devotion, being associated with the feast of Saint Stephen, the first Christian martyr, while retaining symbolic gestures of fertility, renewal, and community cohesion.
