= Materion =

Engineered materials company

- Materion logo
- Formerly: Brush Engineered Materials Inc.
- Traded as: NYSE: MTRN; S&P 600 component
- Industry: Aerospace; Automotive; Consumer electronics; Data center; Defense; Energy; Industrial; Medical device; Semiconductor; Telecommunications
- Predecessor: Brush Beryllium Company
- Founded: January 9, 1931; 95 years ago in Cleveland, Ohio
- Founder: Charles Baldwin Sawyer Bengt Kjellgren
- Headquarters: Mayfield Heights, United States
- Number of locations: 32 (2024)
- Area served: Global
- Revenue: ▲US$1.79 billion (2025)
- Net income: ▲US$74.8 million (2025)
- Number of employees: 3,037 (2024)
- Website: materion.com

Materion Corp. is a multinational company specializing in high-performance advanced materials. Among its products are advanced beryllium metals, thin film deposition materials, high-performance alloys and composites, specialty engineered beryllium, engineered metals, technical ceramics, tantalum, niobium, other precious and non-precious metals, inorganic chemicals, and specialty coatings.

The company serves the aerospace, automotive, consumer electronics, data center, defense, energy, industrial, medical device, semiconductor, and telecommunications markets.

Materion at 9th Bengaluru Space Expo 2026, BIEC

== History ==
Brush Laboratories was founded in 1921 by Charles Brush Jr. and Dr. Charles Baldwin Sawyer, with a focus on extracting beryllium ore and producing beryllium metal, oxide and master alloys. Following the death of Charles Brush Jr. in 1927, the company became the Brush Beryllium Company, led by Dr. Sawyer and Swedish chemical engineer Bengt Kjellgren.

The Brush Beryllium Company was officially incorporated in Cleveland, Ohio, on January 9, 1931. In 1935, the company relocated its production operations to Lorain, Ohio.

A significant setback occurred in 1948 when a fire at the Lorain facility forced the company to cease copper beryllium production. To replace the lost capacity, Brush opened a new alloy production facility in Elmore, Ohio, in 1953.

In 1961, Commander Alan B. Shepard became the first American to make a flight into space. Brush produced materials that provided the re-entry surface of his capsule. Decades later in 2005, Brush would produce and deliver materials to be used in the primary mirror in NASA’s James Webb Space Telescope.

In 1971, Brush made its first major acquisition by purchasing the Wellman division of Abex Corporation. That same year, shareholders approved a name change from Brush Beryllium to Brush Wellman. The company was first listed on the New York Stock Exchange in 1972.

Expansion continued throughout the 1980s and 1990s, with new plants and offices established in the United States (Tucson, Arizona; Lincoln, Rhode Island; Buffalo, New York; Brewster, New York) Germany, the U.K., Japan and Singapore, along with a new facility in Lorain, Ohio.

In 2000, Brush Wellman Inc., along with Technical Materials Inc., Zentrix Technologies, Williams Advanced Materials and various international subsidiaries, were consolidated under a new holding company, Brush Engineered Materials Inc. The company continued to expand through acquisitions in Ireland; Milwaukee, Wisconsin; Westford, Massachusetts and Albuquerque, New Mexico.

On March 8, 2011, the company unified its operations under a single name, Materion Corporation. The following year, Materion acquired a facility in Farnborough, England, and expanded further with the acquisition of a site in Hanau, Germany, in 2017. In 2020, Materion continued its growth with the acquisition of Optics Balzers, and in 2021 the acquisition of the electronic materials business of HC Starck along with a facility in Newton, Massachusetts.

In March 2017, Jugal K. Vijayvargiya was appointed President and Chief Executive Officer. He was also named a director of the corporation.
