= Black & White (Birmingham newspaper) =

Alternative weekly newspaper in Birmingham, Alabama

- Type: Biweekly newspaper
- Owner: Chuck Geiss
- Founder: Chuck Geiss
- Publisher: Chuck Geiss
- Founded: 1992
- Ceased publication: January 10, 2013
- Language: English
- Headquarters: 2210 2nd Avenue North, FL 2, Birmingham, AL 35203-3857
- City: Birmingham, Alabama
- Country: United States
- Circulation: 30,000 (as of 2013)
- ISSN: 1064-0134
- OCLC number: 26199931
- Website: web.archive.org/web/20130505150323/http://www.bwcitypaper.com

Black & White was a biweekly alternative newspaper covering news and culture in Birmingham, Alabama. It was established in 1992 by Chuck Geiss, who continued to own and publish the paper until it shut down in early 2013. A member of the Association of Alternative Newsmedia, it described itself as "Birmingham's oldest and largest non-daily publication". When Black & White suspended publication in 2013, Geiss initially intended to relaunch it with a new business model, but this plan never came to fruition, and the paper ended up permanently shutting down. AL.com described Black & White as "...a victim of the contraction of the print news industry nationwide in the face of advancing digital alternatives."
