= Cascais Jazz Festival =

Portuguese jazz festival

The Cascais Jazz Festival is an annual jazz music festival held in Cascais, on the Portuguese Riviera.

== History ==
The first Cascais Jazz Festival took place on November 20, 1971, in the Dramático de Cascais pavilion in Portugal, organized by the fado singer João Braga and the jazz critic and specialist Luís Villas-Boas. It was the first international jazz festival to take place in Portugal. Miles Davis performed at it—making his first appearance in Portugal—as did Dexter Gordon, Phil Woods, and The Giants of Jazz (Thelonious Monk, Kai Winding, Art Blakey, Sonny Stitt, Al McKibbon and Dizzy Gillespie).

Ornette Coleman's performance began some controversy when during his gig his bassist, Charlie Haden, dedicated their song "Song for Che" to the black liberation movements in Angola and Mozambique, which the authoritarian Estado Novo regime was fighting at that time.
