= Ludopolis =

Portuguese Festival in Lisbon

Ludopolis is a festival held in Lisbon, Portugal, in June. It is organized by Associação Ludopolis (a local non-profit organization). The first edition took place in Jardim Botânico Tropical (near Belém Palace) in 2012 and was visited by 7000 visitors, especially families. More than 1000 games and toys for all ages occupied 3 hectares of the gardens and indoor areas.

The Festival is part of the well-known Festas de Lisboa which also occurs during June. Ludopolis is divided into 5 main areas called "Aldeias" (villages). A board games village, a traditional village, a multimedia village, a kids village, and a building village compose the principal areas. Also, some workshops and cultural actions take place during the event.

A big part of the festival is the Ludopolis International Boardgame Design Contest. The first edition had 78 valid entries from 10 countries. The second edition received 144 games from 11 countries. The second edition occurred over the last two weekends of June 2013.
