= Porto Pride =

Annual LGBT event in Porto, Portugal

Porto Pride is the name of the lesbian, gay, bisexual, and transgender community Pride Party held in Porto in July of each year. The first Porto LGBT Pride Party was in July 2001.

== History ==
Around 1000 people participated in the first edition and this number doubled in the 2008 edition.

The Party is an event supported by commercial entities. It included a community side, where dozens of associations and groups promoted their activities, as well as a charity twist. A significant part of the revenue is donated to a local institution. In 2007 the donation was almost 4,500 euros.

The last edition in this format and the original organization was in 2012.

== Porto Pride Parade ==
Since 2006 a LGBT Pride Parade has also been held in Porto (Porto Pride March). During the first parade almost 500 people participated.

== See also ==
- Lisbon Gay & Lesbian Film Festival
- Lisbon Pride
