= The Lisbon Feminist Festival =

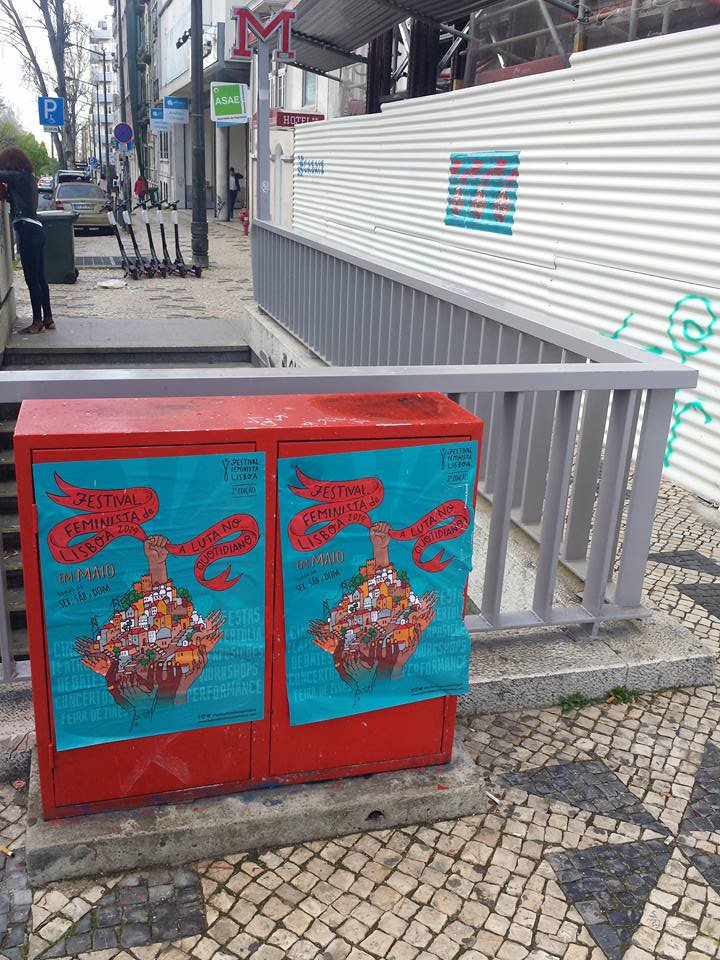
Poster of the second edition of the Lisbon Feminist Festival at the entrance of the metro station in Lisbon, 2019

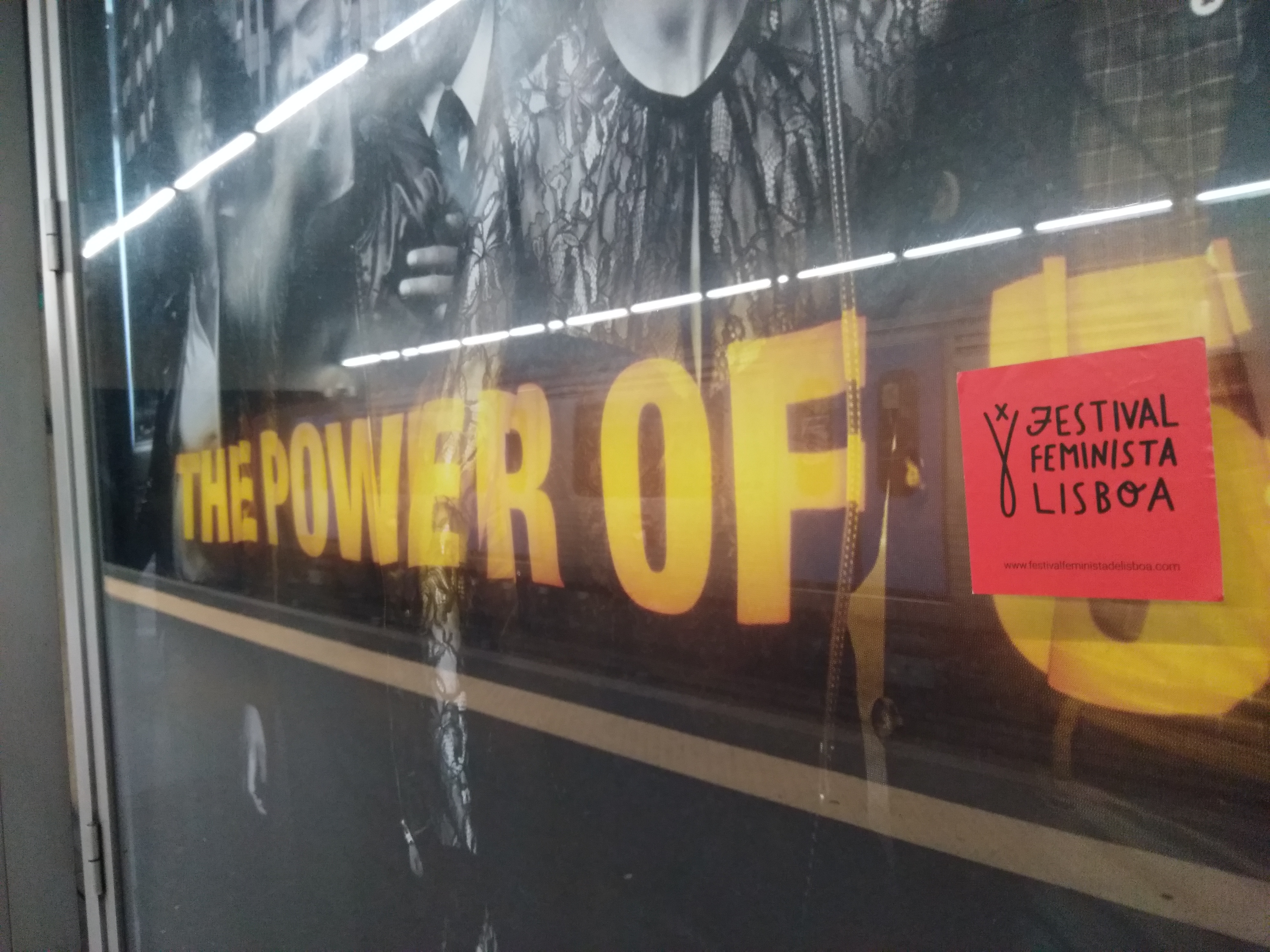
Lisbon Feminist Festival sticker applied on a street advertisement. Lisbon, 2019.

The Lisbon Feminist Festival or Festival Feminista de Lisboa is a civil society initiative, organized annually since 2018, in different locations in the city, around the theme of feminism. All the activities in its program are open to the public and free of charge, and include exhibitions, debates, concerts, workshops, theater, cinema, performances, zine fair, street interventions, etc.

The main values of the feminist festival can be read in its manifesto: anti-capitalist, communitarian and inclusive. With a horizontal and non-profit organizational structure, it is made up of a group of volunteers who came together for the first time at the end of 2017, after an internet call carried out by Cuntroll Zine, a fanzine dedicated to the promotion of artists who identify as women and queer people.

The program of the first and second editions of the event was prepared from a public call for proposals addressed to individuals or collectives for the development of activities, within the scope of the festival, with a focus on feminisms and equal opportunities for all.

== First edition of the Lisbon Feminist Festival (2018) ==
The first event held by the organization was a fundraising party, in February 2018, at the Anjos70 cultural space; The Feminist Carnival aimed to raise funds to cover food, transportation and accommodation expenses of the exhibitors, as well as promotion costs, of its first edition.

The first edition of the Lisbon Feminist Festival took place from March 3rd to 25th, 2018, on Fridays, Saturdays and Sundays.

== Awards ==
At the end of January 2019, in the course of preparing the second edition of the event, the Lisbon Feminist Festival received the Madalena Barbosa award from the Lisbon City Council in partnership with CIG – Commission for Citizenship and Gender Equality. The award ceremony took place on December 10, 2019 in the Archive Room of the Lisbon City Hall.
