= Black & White (Flow album) =

Studio album by Flow
- Released: February 12, 2012
- Genre: Rock
- Label: Ki/oon

Flow chronology
| Microcosm (2010) | Black & White (2012) | Flow The Max (2013) |

Black & White is Flow's seventh studio album. The single has two editions: regular and limited. The limited edition includes a bonus DVD. It reached #29 on the Oricon charts and charted for 3 weeks.

Limited Edition Cover

== Track listing ==
| No. | Title | Length |
|---|---|---|
| 1. | "Hey" | 3:43 |
| 2. | "Rock Climbers (ロッククライマーズ)" | 3:54 |
| 3. | "Kakumei (革命)" | 3:36 |
| 4. | "Konosai Hakkiri Sasetokouka! (この際はっきりさせとこうか!)" | 2:52 |
| 5. | "Kanjou Koushinkyoku (感情行進曲)" | 3:37 |
| 6. | "Chelsea Girl (チェルシーガール)" | 3:52 |
| 7. | "Ohayou Japonica (おはようジャポニカ)" | 4:01 |
| 8. | "Black & White" | 4:19 |
| 9. | "Tabidachi Graffiti (旅立ちグラフィティ)" | 5:48 |
| 10. | "Hikari (光)" | 4:23 |
| 11. | "On the Line" | 4:41 |

== Bonus DVD Track listing ==
| No. | Title | Length |
|---|---|---|
| 1. | "Tabidachi Graffiti (旅立ちグラフィティ) (Music video)" |
| 2. | "Hey (Music video)" |
| 3. | "Rock Climbers (ロッククライマーズ) (Music Video)" |
| 4. | "Rock Climbers (ロッククライマーズ) Off shot" |
| 5. | "The Digest of the Anime Convention in USA" |
| 6. | "Days (Live) (2011.12.4 Nippon Budokan "Lisani! Live 2011")" |
