= Queer Lisboa International Queer Film Festival =

LGBTQ film festival in Lisbon, Portugal

Coordinates: 38°42′10″N 9°8′25″W

- Inaugurated: 1997
- Next event: September 18, 2026 - September 26, 2026
- Website: queerlisboa.pt

The Queer Lisboa - Lisbon Gay & Lesbian Film Festival is an international LGBTQ film festival held annually in venues across Lisbon, Portugal.

The festival was founded in 1997, and has since become the longest running film festival in Lisbon. Originally titled the Lisbon Gay and Lesbian Film Festival, the festival changed its name to Queer Lisboa in 2007. The festival hosts both competitive and non-competitive categories for films, with the winners of the competitive categories receiving cash prizes.

In 2015, the organisers launched Queer Porto, an independent festival from Queer Lisboa.

== History ==
In the beginning, the festival was organised by the ILGA-Portugal Association with Gonçalo Dumas Diniz and Celso Júnior as the organiser and director respectively.

Then mayor of Lisbon, João Soares has frequently expressed his support of the festival. For the fourth iteration of the festival, he commented:

Lisbon, city of freedom and tolerance, therefore takes pride in hosting this event, the significance of which goes well beyond its artistic value, turning it into a forum for the eloquent manifestations of liveliness, democratic exchange, and cultural vitality.

From 2001, the festival was organised by the Cultural Association of the Gay and Lesbian Film Festival of Lisbon (Associação Cultural Festival de Cinema Gay e Lésbico de Lisboa).

From 2004 onwards, the festival was organised by the Rear Window Cultural Association (Associação Cultural Janela Indiscreta).

== Competitive Categories ==
- Best Feature Film: €1000 prize
- Best Documentary: €3000 prize
- Best Short Film: €500 prize
- "In My Shorts" for Best European School Short Film: €500 prize
- Queer Art: €1000 prize

== Non-Competitive Categories ==
- Opening and closing films
- Panorama
- Queer Focus
- Retrospectives
- Hard Nights

== See also ==
- List of LGBT film festivals
- Porto Pride
