= Anjo Festival =

Anjo Festival (Festa do Anjo: Angel Festival) or Ivy Festival (Portuguese: Festa da Hera) is an Easter Monday festival held in coastal Northern Portugal. Originating in Póvoa de Varzim, it is currently observed in several towns, especially Vila do Conde and Esposende.

The festival consists of a family picnic in the surrounding countryside or woodlands, known in the local dialect as Bouças.

== Celebrations ==
=== Origins ===
The festival was popularized in the Ivy Festival of the 1920s, as a reminder of pagan culture and beliefs, which started from the traditional walk of the inhabitants of Póvoa de Varzim to Anjo woodlands (Bouças do Anjo), the name of the parish of Argivai (Parish of Saint Michael, the Angel). Anjo literally means angel. Part of the town's population originated in this parish in ancient times. Although currently several woodlands are used, such as Ofir and Barca do Lago in Esposende, Serra de Rates and São Félix Hill in Póvoa de Varzim, Mindelo and Árvore in Vila do Conde.

=== The ivy as a love symbol ===
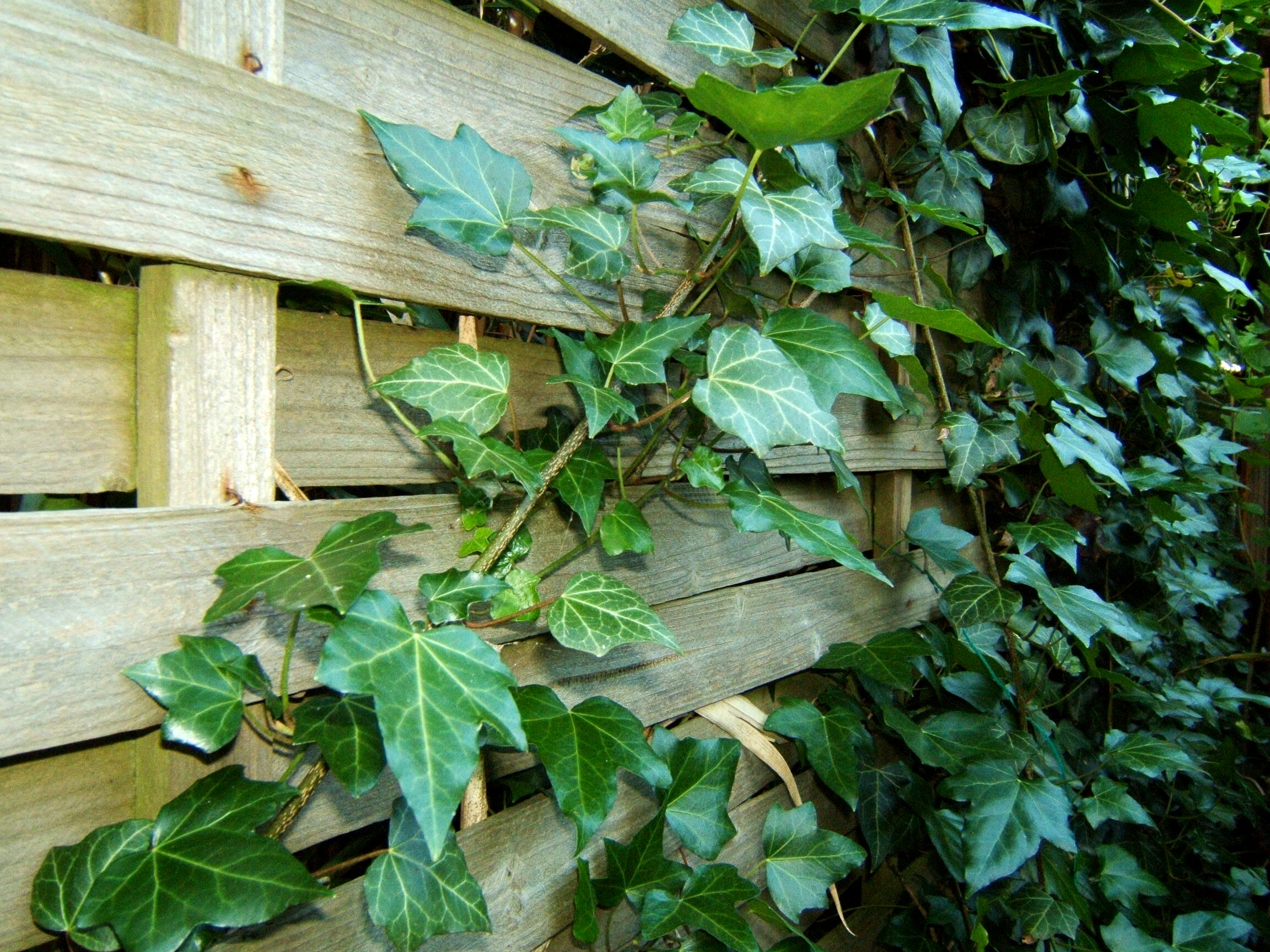
the Ivy, Hedera helix.

The Anjo Festival was also a lovers' day. Students and other single young men waited for this day with great anxiety as it was the only day that their parents gave them complete freedom during all day and night. During the picnic people sang and danced.

Girls, in the 1920s, in order to finance a local brass band used the traditional walk to the Anjo and placed themselves in the entrance of the woodlands where families had their picnic, selling ivy leaves to couples and singing ivy poems which led the couples to buy them, young men would put the ivy in their hats or pockets and girls would place them in their chests.

Ivy poems:

The one who walked away from the ivy
and did not pick a leaf,
will not remember one's love.

I wish I was an ivy
to climb the wall
and look through the window
of your bedroom.

=== The ivy and Easter ===
The ivy is a very common plant in Póvoa de Varzim, often found in granite walls that divide farmlands and, on Easter Sunday, with the arrival of Spring, they become symbolic and interweaved with Christian beliefs: the population picks ivy leaves and spreads them in the streets, especially near one's door or forming corridors meant to be stepped on by the compasso pascal, a Catholic parade that brings the Lord in the Crucifix into one's home.

=== Anjo as an Holiday ===
In the mid-20th century, Anjo day was suggested to become the Póvoa de Varzim municipal holiday when August 15, the local holiday, was declared a national holiday, but given the fact that Easter Monday was already a public holiday during that period, Saint Peter festival was chosen as the city's holiday. Although Easter Monday is currently not observed in Portugal, cities become ghost towns during this day as the population and companies prefer to work on Holy Friday, a national holiday, to have Monday off. Póvoa de Varzim City Hall grants the day off to its public servants and, since 1966, Vila do Conde also grants the day.
