= Monochrome (disambiguation) =

Monochrome refers to an image or palette comprising shades of a single color. Monochromatic may be used synonymously with monochrome, or may refer to a distinct concept: to describe light that is composed of a single wavelength (Monochromatic radiation), which evokes a spectral color.

Monochrome may also refer to:

== Technology ==
- Monochrome monitor, used with computers
- Monochrome photography, also known as black-and-white photography
- Monochrome painting, a style of painting that uses a single color (excluding shades thereof)
- Monochrome printmaking, printing styles that generate black-and-white images
- Monochrome BBS, a text-based multi-user bulletin board system

== Music ==
=== Albums ===
- Monochrome (Helmet album), 2006, or the title track
- Monochrome, a 2009 album by July for Kings
- Monochrome (Lee Hyori album), 2013
- Monochrome, a 2002 live album and DVD by German rock band Fury in the Slaughterhouse
- Monochrome, a 2017 solo album by Daniel Cavanagh from the band Anathema

=== Songs ===
- "Monochrome" (Ammonia song), 1998
- "Monochrome", a song by Lush from the 1991 EP Black Spring
- "Monochrome", a song by Spahn Ranch from the 1997 album Architecture
- "Monochrome", a song by Masayoshi Takanaka from the 1997 album The White Goblin
- "Monochrome", a song by Laputa from the 1997 album Emadara
- "Monochrome", a song by The Sundays from the 1997 album Static & Silence
- "Monochrome", a song by Yann Tiersen with vocals by Dominique A, from Tiersen's 1998 album Le Phare
- "Monochrome", a track from the 1999 release A by Japanese singer-songwriter Ayumi Hamasaki
- "Monochrome", a song by Mark Lizotte from the 1999 album Soul Lost Companion
- "Monochrome", a song by Collide from the 2000 album Chasing the Ghost
- "Monochrome", a song by Covenant from the 2002 album Northern Light
- "Monochrome", a song by Julian Corrie from the 2007 album Rainbow Bubbles
- "Monochrome", a song by Antimatter from the 2012 album Fear of a Unique Identity
- "Monochrome", a song by Arashi from the 2013 single "Endless Game"
- "Monochrome", a song by Inspiral Carpets from the 2014 album Inspiral Carpets
- "monochrome", a song by Kalafina from the 2015 album Far on the Water
- "Monochrome", a song by Tkay Maidza from the 2016 album Tkay
- "monochrome", a song by Jurina Matsui from the 2019 album Privacy
- "Monochrome", a song by Between the Buried and Me from the 2021 album Colors II
- "Monochrome", a song by Babymetal, the second single from the 2023 concept album The Other One
- "Monochrome", a song by Mumford & Sons from the 2025 album Rushmere
- "Monochrome", a song by Lovejoy from the 2025 album One Simple Trick

== See also ==
- Monochromacy (or monochromatism), a type of color vision deficiency
- monochrom, an international art-technology-philosophy group
- Chromate (disambiguation)
