= Black & White Festival =

Black & White Audiovisual Festival
- Promotional Poster
- Location: Porto, Portugal
- Founded: 2004
- No. of films: 50-100
- Festival date: April
- Language: International
- Website: http://www.artes.ucp.pt/b&w/

The Black & White Audiovisual Festival (Portuguese: Festival Audiovisual Black & White) is a Portuguese arts festival which takes place in April. It celebrates the black & white aesthetics in film, photography and sound. It's located at Universidade Católica Portuguesa - Centro Regional da Foz – through the Escola das Artes in Oporto, Portugal.

== About ==
The Black & White Audiovisual Festival intends to celebrate the black and white aesthetics as a specific, peculiar and unique kind of artistic expression. The image capture in the digital technology is born with colours but the artist's intuition often urges for the black and white production. This proves the newness and interest in an aesthetic that can only be communicated through black and white. Besides, the Black & White Audiovisual Festival also intends to promote the creation of soundscapes related with the black and white aesthetics. It is necessary to educate the audience to the black and white specificity, to avoid the prejudice that relates the black and white with fastidious and pretentious works.

== History ==
The festival began in April 2004 with its first edition. It's a world-renowned festival which receives everyone, amateurs and professionals alike, of the area of audiovisual art. Since it takes place at an Arts University, it counts on the support of the students for its projection and growth. Major personalities were featured in previous editions, such as Manoel de Oliveira or Carlos Zingaro.

== Awards ==
The festival comprehends three different areas: Sound, Video and Photography. The Video category awards are the following: Best Fiction, Best Animation, Best Documentary & Best Experimental. In the Sound category the awards are for Best Experimental, Best Fiction and Best Report. Finally, for the Photography category the award is for Best Photography.
