= Fort Nossa Senhora da Queimada =

Fort of Pessegueiro
- Forte do Pessegueiro
- Setúbal, Alentejo Litoral, Alentejo in Portugal
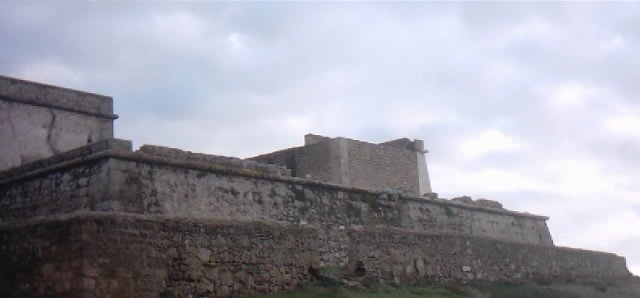
- A view of the large bastions of the fort from the main beach

Site information
- Type: Fort
- Owner: Portuguese Republic
- Operator: DRCAlgarve, Decree 34/2007, 20 March 2007
- Open to the public: Public

Location
- Location of the fort in the municipality of Sines
- Coordinates: 37°49′42.3″N 8°47′27.4″W

Site history
- Built: 1588
- Materials: Masonry, Stonework

The Fort Nossa Senhora da Queimada (Portuguese: Forte de Nossa Senhora da Queimada), also known as Fort of Pessegueiro (Portuguese: Forte do Pessegueiro), is a fort situated along the coast of the civil parish of Porto Covo, municipality of Sines, in the southern Alentejo of Portugal, across from the island of the same name.

== History ==
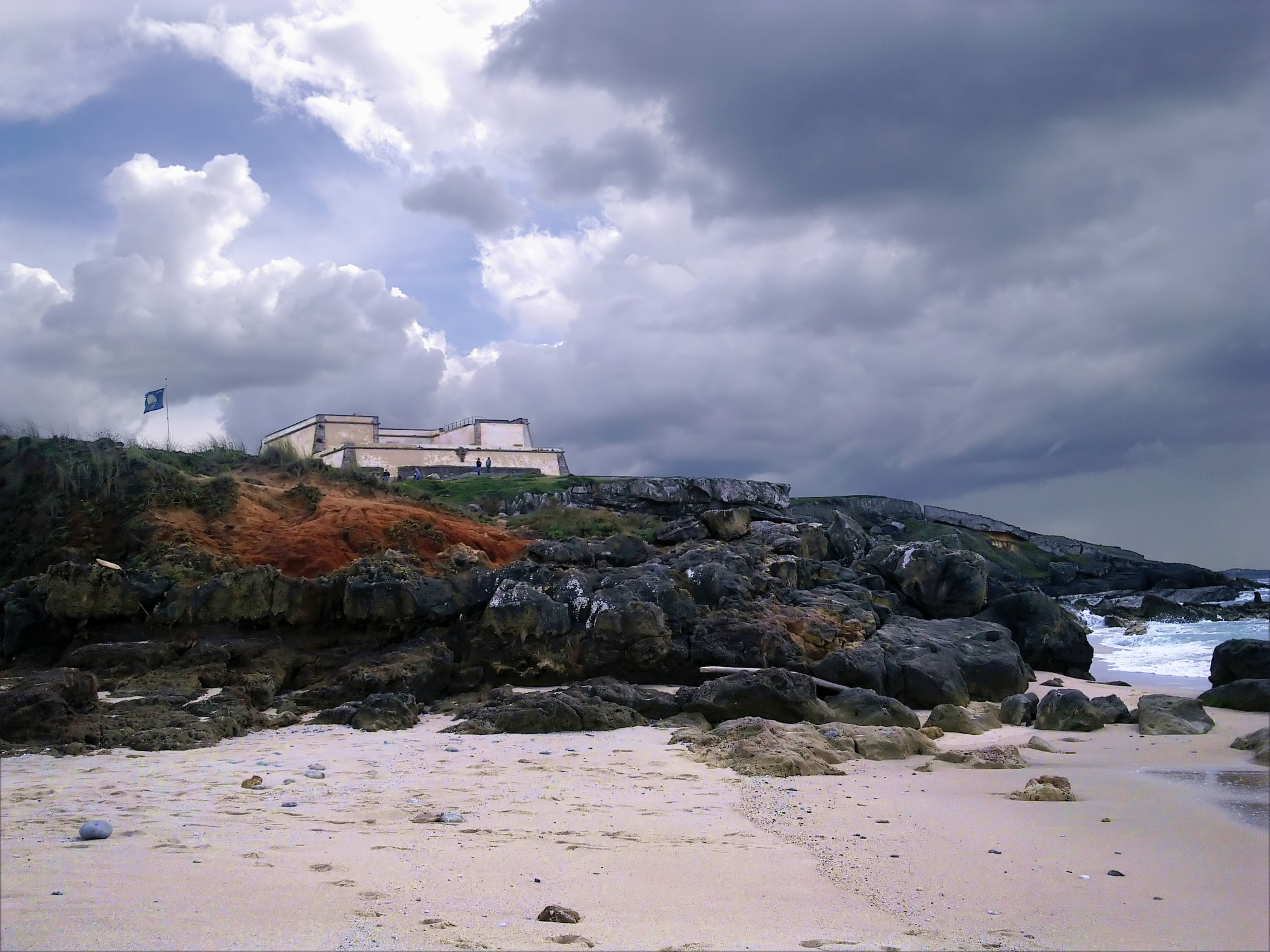
View of the fort from the beach

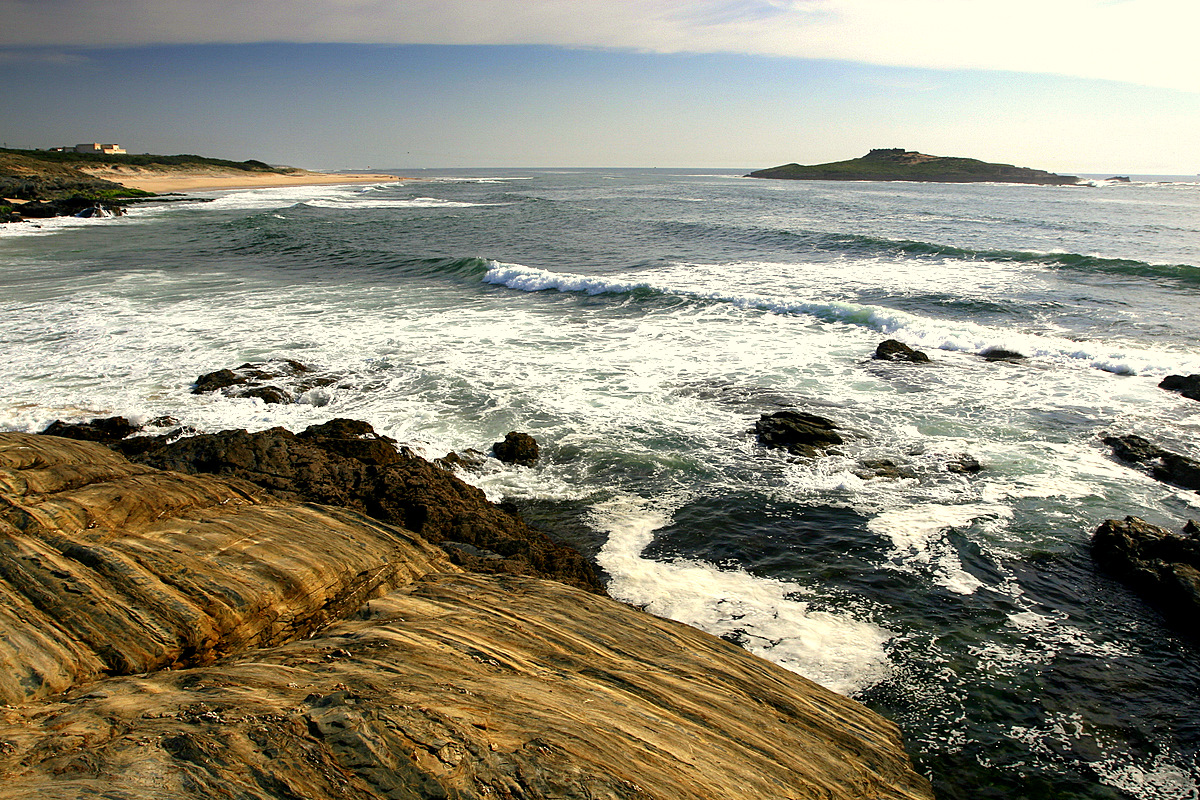
The island of Pessegueiro, on which is situated the fort's twin, the Fort of Santo Alberto

In 1588, with the approval of Cardinal Alberto, the Vice-Regal representative, Filippo Terzi initiated construction of the Fort of Nossa Senhora da Queimada, part of a project that also included the building of an artificial port to link the island of Pessegueiro to the mainland. Alexandre Massay took Terzi's place in 1590, when construction of the Fort of Santo Alberto (a project which had been proposed two years previously), began on Pessegueiro.

The public works were interrupted in 1598, when Massay was transferred to Vila Nova de Milfontes, where he began building a defensive fort along the sandbar of Mira River. The project was restarted five years later. Between 1661 and 1690, the fort went through several phases of construction with long pauses before it was eventually completed during the reign of King Peter II near the end of the 17th century, while its twin, the Fort of Santo Alberto, as well as the artificial port, remained incomplete.

The final layout of the fort, which originally had been designed in the Mannerist style, was simplified as a rectangle, suggesting to some historians that the later version was designed by Captain João Rodrigues Mouro. In 1755, the famous Lisbon earthquake resulted in damage to the chapel and the batteries situated over the casemates. Between 1877 and 1942, the fort was occupied by a contingent of the Fiscal Guard (Guarda Fiscal).

Following its abandonment, a project was conceived in 1962 to convert the fort into a hostel, but was never approved or initiated. On 18 July 1957, a decree classified the Fort of Pessegueiro, including the island of the same name, as a national heritage; this classification was clarified by a new decree on 21 December 1974.

Between 1983 and 1985, repairs were made to the exterior parapets of the left bastion and central zone (the former port entrance) by the Direcção Geral dos Edifícios e Monumentos Nacionais (DGEMN). Ruined sections were reconstructed and areas in risk of damage along the exterior walls were reinforced.

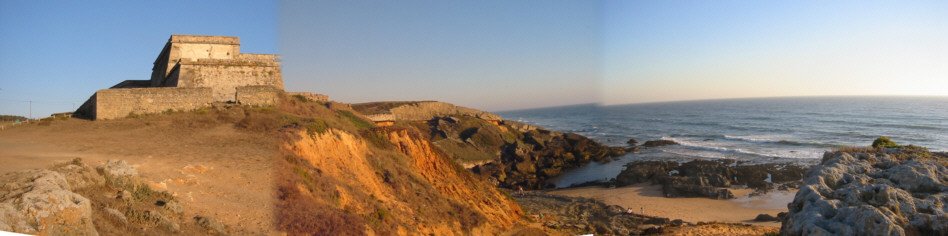
Panoramic view of the fort and Pessegueiro beach, with cliffs

== Architecture ==
The Fort of Pessegueiro is situated along the Atlantic maritime coast, and dominates the beach facing the Fort of Santo Alberto on the island of Pessegueiro. It consists of a star-shaped polygon with two triangular bastions oriented toward land and a polygonal battery towards the beach; these are encircled by relatively low walls. The interior of the fort is built on a U-shaped plan, and stepped in terraces. The thick masonry walls, constructed using stone wedges, align with the slope and are topped by a semi-circular railing above the surrounding torus. There are traces of a circular bartizan in the middle of the wall facing the sea. A main gate is situated in the middle of wall on the land side, accessed by a wooden bridge crossing a moat. The fort also has vaulted casemates and bunkers with chimneys enclosed by the walls. The Hermitage of Nossa Senhora da Queimada, which has a vaulted ceiling, lies at the extreme north end of the fort.
