= Pegões Aqueduct =

Aqueduct in Tomar, Portugal

Pegões Aqueduct Aqueduto de Pegões (or Aqueduto do Convento de Cristo)
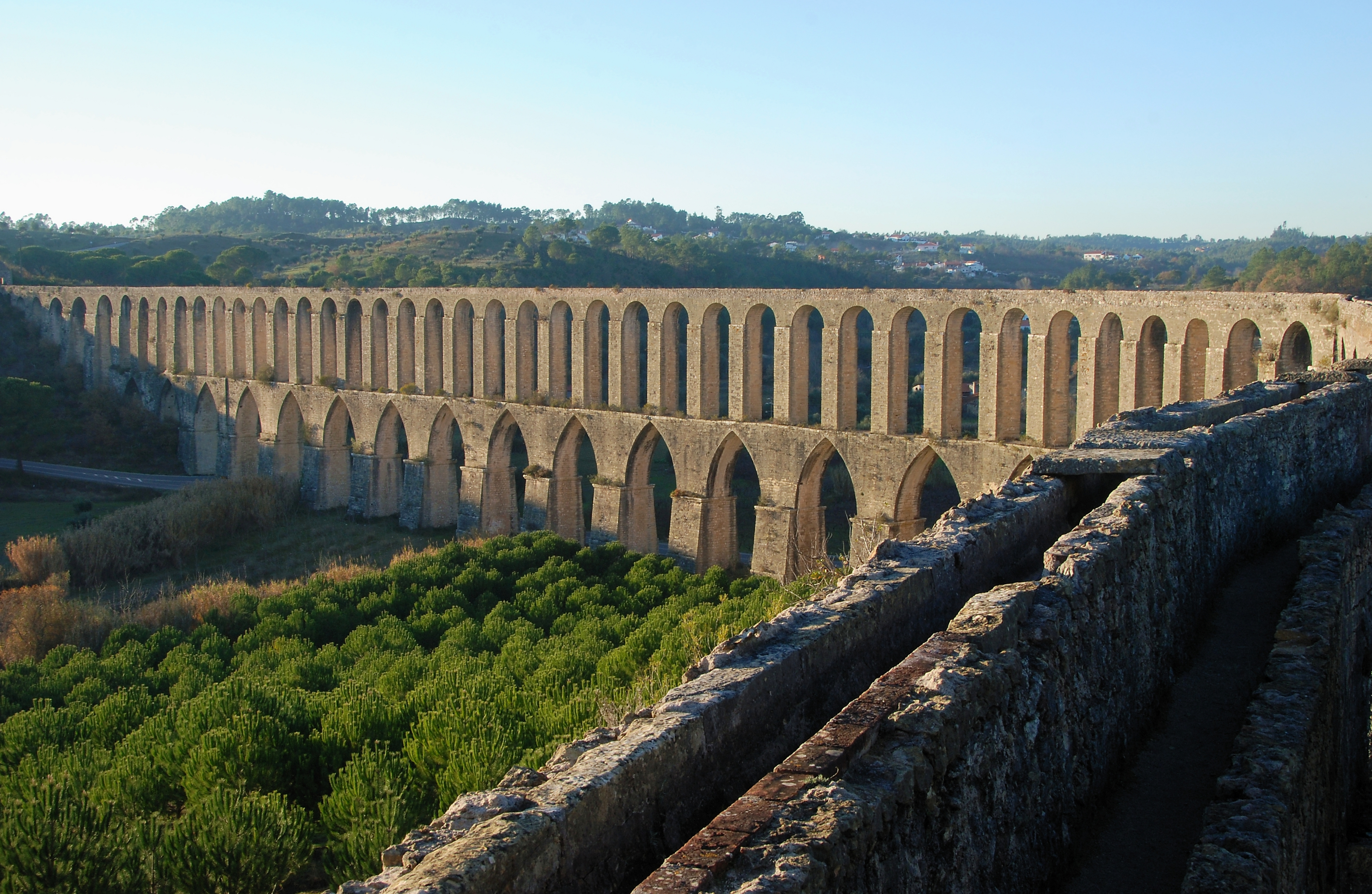
- Coordinates: 39°36′29″N 8°26′18″W
- Carries: Water
- Crosses: Pegões Valley
- Locale: Tomar, Portugal

Characteristics
- Design: Arch aqueduct
- Total length: 6,233 m (20,449 ft)

History
- Architect: Filippo Terzi
- Engineering design by: Fernandes de Torres
- Construction end: 1619
- Closed: mid-20th century

Location
- Interactive map of Pegões Aqueduct

The Convent of Christ Aqueduct, also known as the Pegões Aqueduct, was built to supply water to the Convent of Christ in Tomar from four different springs. It is approximately 6 km long. Its construction began in 1593, during the reign of Philip I of Portugal, under the direction of Filippo Terzi, the chief architect of Portugal, and was completed in 1614 by Pedro Fernando de Torres. The aqueduct has been classified as a National Monument since 1910 and was used until the mid-20th century.

== History ==
Although the cisterns of the Convent of Christ were sufficient for the friars' needs, there was insufficient water for cultivating the lands surrounding the convent. Upon becoming King of Portugal, Philip II of Spain also became Master of the Order of Christ. It was in this capacity that he commissioned Terzi to build an aqueduct that would provide water for the convent and the surrounding lands.

== Construction and maintenance ==
The aqueduct was designed in 1584 by Terzi and construction was approved in 1593. Preparatory work, such as purchase of the necessary land, began in 1595. After Terzi's death in 1597, the management of the construction work, which appears to have begun in 1600, was passed to Fernandes de Torres. The first phase was only completed in 1614. In 1616, with responsibility handed over to Diogo Marques Lucas, the aqueduct's pipeline was extended into the convent buildings, reaching the main cloister in 1619. The completion of the work was marked by the monumental fountain of the main cloister.

The structure had semi-circular limestone gutters for the water and was 6.223km long. It had 180 arches covering around 400 metres, with the section over the Pegões valley consisting of 58 rounded arches resting on 16 pointed arches. The rest of the aqueduct is at ground level, partially embedded in the land. Water flowed by gravity, there being a difference in height between beginning and end of 26.28 metres.

In 1752 new water sources were identified and connection of these to the aqueduct was started. In 1842 Queen Maria II allowed the population of Tomar, situated below the convent, to use up to two thirds of the water, subject to the local council arranging to install the necessary pipes and a fountain where the people could obtain the water. With this seems to have come the obligation to repair the aqueduct, which the council lacked the funds to do. It was lent money for the purpose by António Bernardo da Costa Cabral, 1st Marquis of Tomar. From that time there were, when funds permitted, many further interventions to repair the aqueduct.

By 1972 the aqueduct was in a poor condition, in part because of landscaping on private land, which put the stability of the aqueduct at risk by affecting the foundations of more than 20 arches. There had also been theft of some of the stone, as well as vandalism. Excavations in 1980 put at risk additional arches. Work by the local water company in 2005 may have damaged the underground gallery of the aqueduct close to its beginning. Following an architectural survey in 2009, work was undertaken between 2009 and 2017 by the local community to remove the surrounding vegetation cover and scrub. In 2017 work was authorised to consolidate the aqueduct's structure by supporting the stonework with steel elements.
