= Convent of Christ (Tomar) =

Former Catholic convent in Tomar, Portugal

- Convento de Cristo

General information
- Type: Monastery
- Architectural style: Manueline
- Location: Tomar (São João Baptista) e Santa Maria dos Olivais, Tomar, Portugal
- Coordinates: 39°36′17″N 8°25′3″W
- Opened: 1160
- Owner: Portuguese Republic

UNESCO World Heritage Site
- Official name: Convent of Christ in Tomar
- Criteria: Cultural: (i), (vi)
- Reference: 265
- Inscription: 1983 (7th Session)

Portuguese National Monument
- Type: Non-movable
- Criteria: National Monument
- Designated: 10 January 1907
- Reference no.: IPA.00004718

Distant panoramic view

The Convent of Christ of Tomar (Portuguese: Convento de Cristo de Tomar), also called Convent of Christ (Convento de Cristo) or Monastery of Christ (Mosteiro de Cristo), is a former Catholic convent in Tomar, Portugal.

Originally a 12th-century Templar stronghold, when the order was dissolved in the 14th century the Portuguese branch was turned into the Knights of the Order of Christ, that later supported Portugal's maritime discoveries of the 15th century. The Castle and Convent of Christ in Tomar is a historic and cultural monument and was listed as a UNESCO World Heritage site in 1983.

== History ==
=== Templars ===
The castle was founded by the Order of Poor Knights of the Temple in 1118. Its construction continued until the final part of the 12th century with the construction of the oratory, in one of the angles of the castle, completed by the Grand Master D. Gualdim Pais sometime around 1160. In 1190 it resisted a major attack from the armies of caliph Abu Yusuf al-Mansur, who was successful in taking strongholds in the south. A plaque was erected near the entrance to the castle to commemorate this event.

During the second quarter of the 13th century, Tomar was transferred into the control of the Templars, becoming its seat. The castle became an integral part of the defence system created by the Templars to secure the border of the young Christian Kingdom against the Moors, which at the time occupied the area to approximately the Tagus River. But, following the dissolution of the Templar Order, on 14 March 1319, and following the request of King Denis of Portugal, Pope John XXII instituted the Order of Christ. The seat of the former Knights Templar was converted in 1357 into the seat of this new order.

The famous round church (rotunda) of the castle of Tomar was also built in the second half of the 12th century. The church, like some other templar churches throughout Europe, was modelled after the Dome of the Rock in Jerusalem, which was believed by the crusaders to be a remnant of the Temple of Solomon. The Church of the Holy Sepulchre of Jerusalem may also have served as model.

=== Order of Christ ===
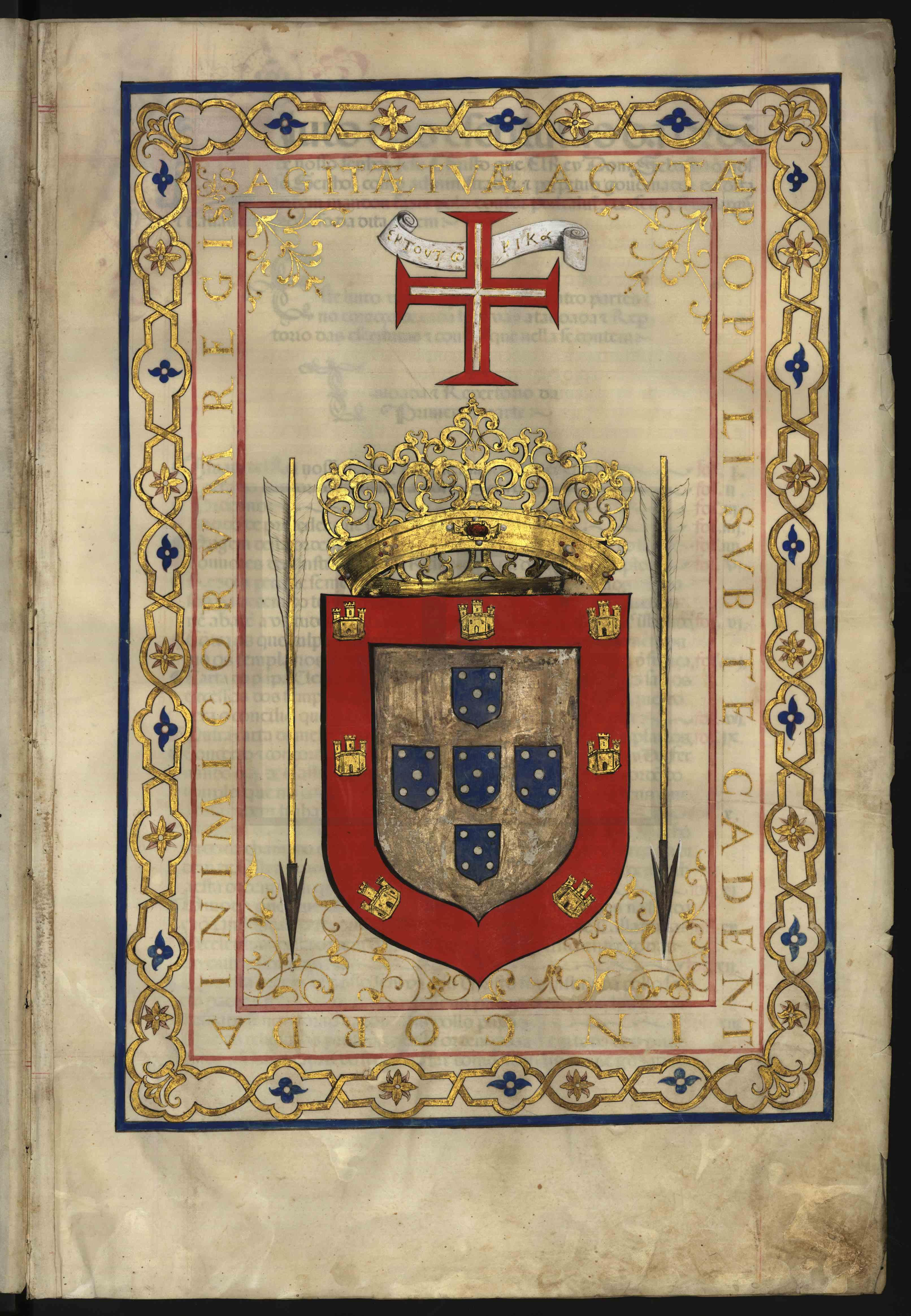
Book of the deeds of the Order of Christ ordered to be made by Sebastian of Portugal in 1560, intended for the registry office of the Order-based, at the time, in the Convent of Christ.

Following the dissolution of the Templar Order, on 14 March 1319 (following the request of King Denis of Portugal), Pope John XXII instituted the Order of Christ. The Templar order had been suppressed during most of Europe from 1312 to 1314, but in Portugal its members, assets, and partly its membership were transferred to the Order of Christ. The seat of the former Knights Templar was converted in 1357 into the seat of this new order. As a result, at about the first half of the 15th century, work was completed to adapt the Templar oratory, introducing an open choir to the western niche, about half-way up the wall. What remains of this adaptation was the colonnade frame with interior arch. At the same time the main palace was constructed.

During the internship of Prince Henry the Navigator as its leader (1417–1450), the Order of Christ initiated the construction of two cloisters under the direction of master Fernão Gonçalves: the Claustro do Cemitério (Cemetery Cloister) and Claustro das Lavagens (Washing Cloister). Prior to these large works, Henry began work on constructing the Chapel of São Jorge sometime in 1426 and was responsible for urban improvements in the town of Tomar.

In 1484, King D. Manuel (who became Master of the Order in 1484 and King of Portugal in 1495) ordered the construction of a sacristy (today the Hall of Passage), that connected the choir to the Chapel of São Jorge, linking the choir with the wall of the stronghouse. By the end of the century, the convent's General Chapter, decided to expand the convent (sometime around 1492), with 3,500 reis being spent on the public works in 1499: the chapterhouse, main altar, ironworks for the niche/archway, paintings and sculptures (for the same) and the choir were all expanded or remodelled.

A new meeting of the Chapter to reform the Order, ordered by the King 1503, expropriated the old Vila de Dentro, within the walls and closed the Sun Gate and Almedina Gate. On 11 October 1504, Francisco Lopes was nominated as masterbuilder for the project, by King John III, receiving 8$000 reis annually and 120 reis for meals. By 1506, D. Manuel decided to order the construction of the church's nave.

The successor of Manuel I, King John III, demilitarised the order, turning it into a more religious order with a rule based on that of Bernard of Clairvaux. He also ordered the construction of a new cloister in 1557, which is one of the best examples of Renaissance architecture in Portugal.

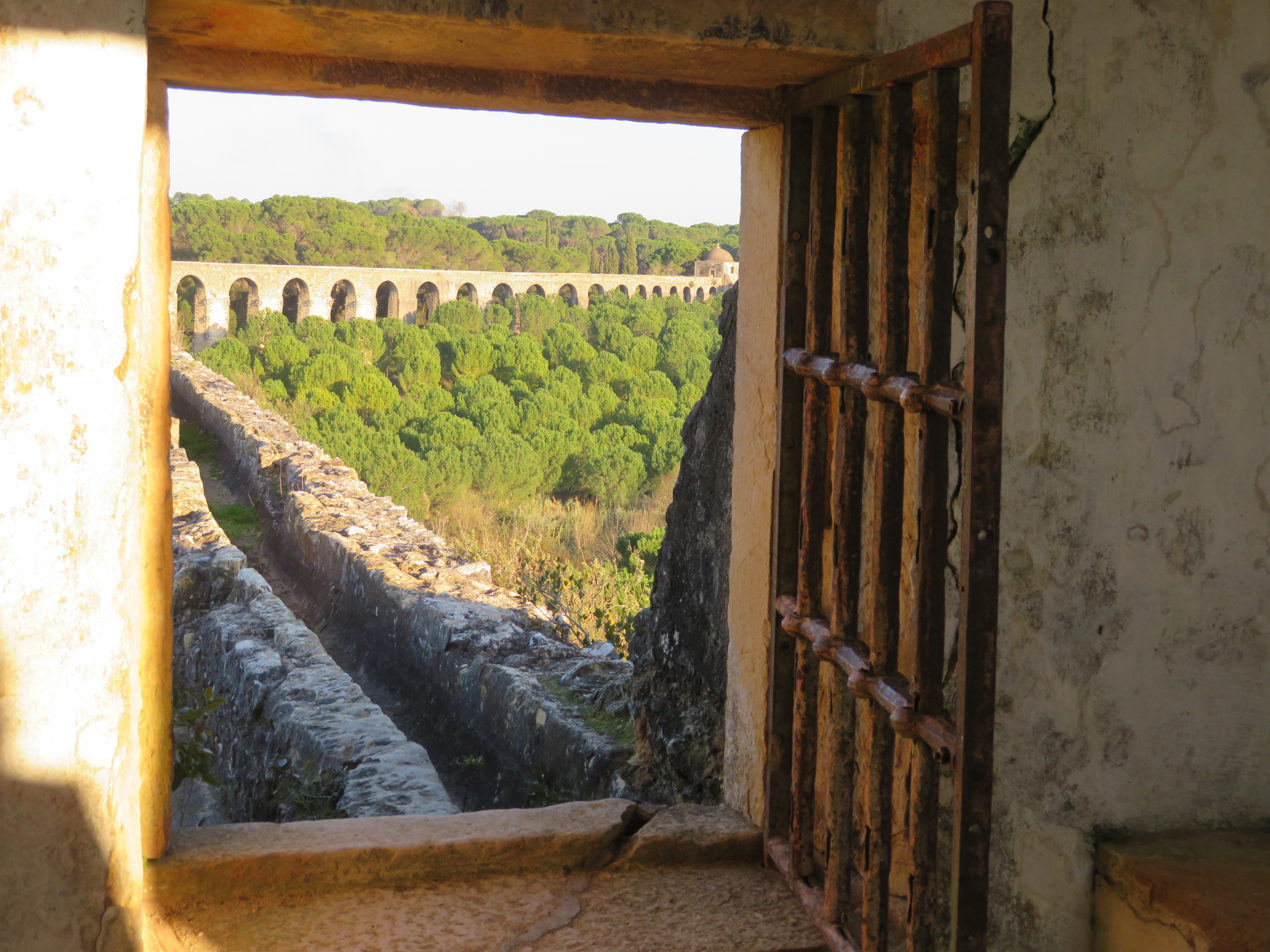
Views of the Pegões Aqueduct, showing its path from the upstream water house to the Convent of Christ

In 1581, after a succession crisis, the Portuguese Nobility gathered in the Convent of Christ in Tomar and officially recognised Philip II of Spain (Philip I of Portugal) as King. This is the beginning of the Iberian Union (1581–1640), during which the Crowns of Portugal and Spain were united in a dynastic union. The aqueduct of the Convent was built during this period (aqueduct completed in 1614).

== Architecture ==
The Tactile Model of the Convent of Christ

Floorplan of the church of the Convent of Christ. The Templar round church (late 12th century) is indicated in red, while the manueline nave (early 16th century) is in blue.

The castle and Convent of Christ have examples of Romanesque, Gothic, Manueline and Renaissance architectural styles.

=== Castle ===
The castle of Tomar was built around 1160 on a strategic location, over a hill and near river Nabão. It has an outer defensive wall and a citadel (alcáçova) with a keep inside. The Keep, a central tower of residential and defensive functions, was introduced in Portugal by the Templars, and the one in Tomar is one of the oldest in the country. Another novelty introduced in Portugal by the Templars (learned from decades of experience in Normandy and Brittany and elsewhere) are the round towers in the outer walls, which are more resistant to attacks than square towers. When the town was founded, most of its residents lived in dwellings located inside the protective outer walls of the castle.

=== Church ===
The Romanesque round church is a Catholic Church from the castle (charola, rotunda) was built in the second half of the 12th century by the Knights Templar. From the outside, the church is a 16-side polygonal structure, with strong buttresses, round windows and a belltower. Inside, the round church has a central, octagonal structure, connected by arches to a surrounding gallery (ambulatory). The general shape of the church is modelled after similar round structures in Jerusalem: the Mosque of Omar and the Church of the Holy Sepulchre.

The capitals of the columns are still Romanesque (end of the 12th century) and depict vegetal and animal motifs, as well as a Daniel in the Lions' Den scene. The style of the capitals shows the influence of artists working on the Cathedral of Coimbra, which was being built at the same time as the round church.

The interior of the round church is magnificently decorated with late gothic/manueline sculpture and paintings, added during a renovation sponsored by King Manuel I starting in 1499. The pillars of the central octagon and the walls of the ambulatory have polychrome statues of saints and angels under exuberant Gothic canopies, while the walls and ceilings of the ambulatory are painted with Gothic patterns and panels depicting the life of Christ. The paintings are attributed to the workshop of the court painter of Manuel I, the Portuguese Jorge Afonso, while the sculptured decoration is attributed to Flemish sculptor Olivier de Gand and the Spaniard Hernán Muñoz. A magnificent panel depicting the martyrdom of Saint Sebastian, by Portuguese painter Gregório Lopes, was painted for the Round Church and now hangs in the National Museum of Ancient Art in Lisbon.

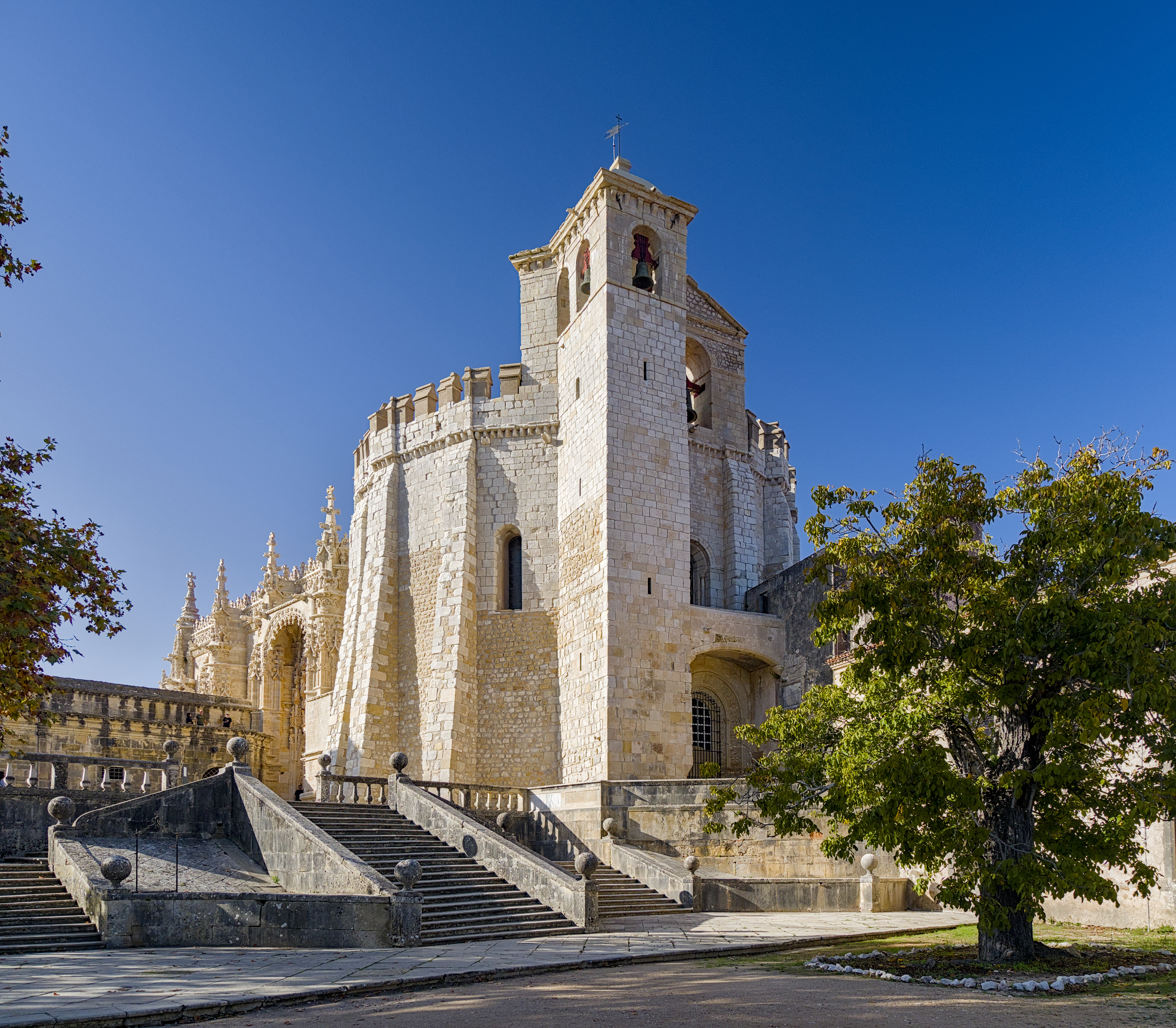
Exterior of the round church

West façade of the Manueline church

Manueline chapterhouse window

Gargoyles

Manueline portal of the convent church

Vault of the Charola

Central sanctuary of the Charola

Paintings inside the Charola

New sacristy

=== Manueline nave ===
During the administration of Prince Henry the Navigator (first half of the 15th century), a gothic nave was added to the round church of the Convent, thus turning the round church into a church apse. From 1510 onwards, King Manuel I ordered the rebuilding of the nave in the style of the time, a mix of late gothic and renaissance that would be called Manueline style by art historians. The architects involved were the Portuguese Diogo de Arruda and the Spaniard Juan de Castillo (João de Castilho).

From the outside, the rectangular nave is covered by abundant Manueline motifs, including gargoyles, gothic pinnacles, statues and "ropes" that remind the ones used in the ships during the Age of Discovery, as well as the Cross of the Order of Christ and the emblem of King Manuel I, the armillary sphere. The so-called Window of the Chapter House (Janela do Capítulo), a huge window visible from the Saint Barbara Cloister in the Western façade of the nave, carries most of the typical Manueline motifs: the symbols of the Order of Christ and of Manuel I, and elaborations of ropes, corals and vegetal motifs. A human figure in the bottom of the window probably represents the designer, Diogo de Arruda. This window of the Convent constitutes one of the masterworks of Manueline decoration. Above is a smaller circular window and a balustrade. The façade is divided by two string courses of knotted ropes. The round angle buttresses are decorated with gigantic garters (alluding to investiture of Manuel I by the Order of the Garter by the English king Henry VII).

The entrance of the church is done through a lateral portal, also decorated with abundant Manueline motifs and statues of the Virgin with the Child as well as the Prophets of the Old Testament. This portal was designed by João de Castilho c. 1530.

In the interior, the Manueline nave is connected to the Romanesque round church by a large arch. The nave is covered by ribbed vaulting and has a high choir that used to have Manueline choir stalls, destroyed by invading Napoleonic troops in the early 19th century. Under the high choir there is a room that used to be the sacristy of the church. Its window is the famous Chapter House Window already mentioned.

=== Cloisters ===
The Convent of Christ has a total of eight cloisters, built between the 15th and 17th centuries:

Claustro da Lavagem (Washing Cloister): Two-storey Gothic cloister built around 1433 under Henry the Navigator. The garments of the monks used to be washed in this cloister, hence the name.
Claustro do Cemitério (Cemetery Cloiste): Built by the architect Fernão Gonçalves when the Infante Prince Henry was Governor and Administrator of the Order of Christ (1420–60), it was remodelled at the beginning of the 17th century (Filipian period). It served as ground for religious processions and burial of the friar knights. Arcosolia built in this cloister house the tombs of D. Diogo da Gama († 1523), Baltazar de Faria († 1584) and Pedro Álvares Seco de Freitas († 1599).
Claustro de Santa Bárbara (Cloister of Saint Barbara): The construction of the Small Cloister, as it was first known, started in 1531 under the architect João de Castilho; from that time it would provide access within the Convent. In 1843, by order of King Ferdinand II of Portugal, the upper floor was demolished in order to allow more space for the Manueline Window.
Claustro de D. João III (Cloister of John III): Started under King John III of Portugal and finished during the reign of Philip I of Portugal. Designed by Diogo de Torralva starting in 1557 and completed in 1591 by Italian architect Filippo Terzi, this two-storey cloister connects the dormitory to the church and is considered a masterpiece of Mannerist architecture in Portugal. The storeys are connected by four helicoidal corner stairways.
Claustro da Hospedaria (Hostelry Cloister): Built in the 16th century during the reign of King John III to accommodate distinguished guests and pilgrims.
Claustro da Micha (Micha Cloister): Built in the mid-16th century, it was used for baking and distributing bread (known as micha) to the poor.
Claustro dos Corvos (Cloister of the Crows): Built alongside the Hospedaria and Micha cloisters to serve as services and additional quarters for the monastery.
Claustro das Necessidades (Cloister of Necessity): Built in the 17th century, housing the sanitation and utility facilities for the monks.

== See also ==
- High medieval domes
- Pegões Aqueduct, which supplied water to the convent
