= Renaissance architecture in Portugal =

The architecture of the Portuguese Renaissance intimately linked to Gothic architecture and gradual in its classical elements. The Manueline style (circa 1490–1535) was a transitional style that combined Renaissance and Gothic ornamental elements to buildings that were architectonically closer to Gothic architecture, as is the Isabelline style of Spain. Manueline was succeeded by a brief Early Renaissance phase (c. 1530–1550), closer to Classical canons, followed by the adoption of Mannerist (late Renaissance) forms. Portuguese Mannerism, specially in secular architecture, is characterised by simplicity in the organisation of façades and relative lack of decoration, being often referred to as Estilo Chão (plain style). Even with the arrival of Baroque architecture in the late 17th century, Portuguese architecture continued to use Mannerist forms well into the 18th century.

== Historiography ==
Two important works on Portuguese post–medieval architecture included Albrecht Haupt's Die Baukunst der Renaissance in Portugal, which was published in two volumes in 1890 and 1895, and Francisco de Sousa Viterbo's study of Portuguese builders and designers, dated 1899 to 1922.

== Religious architecture ==
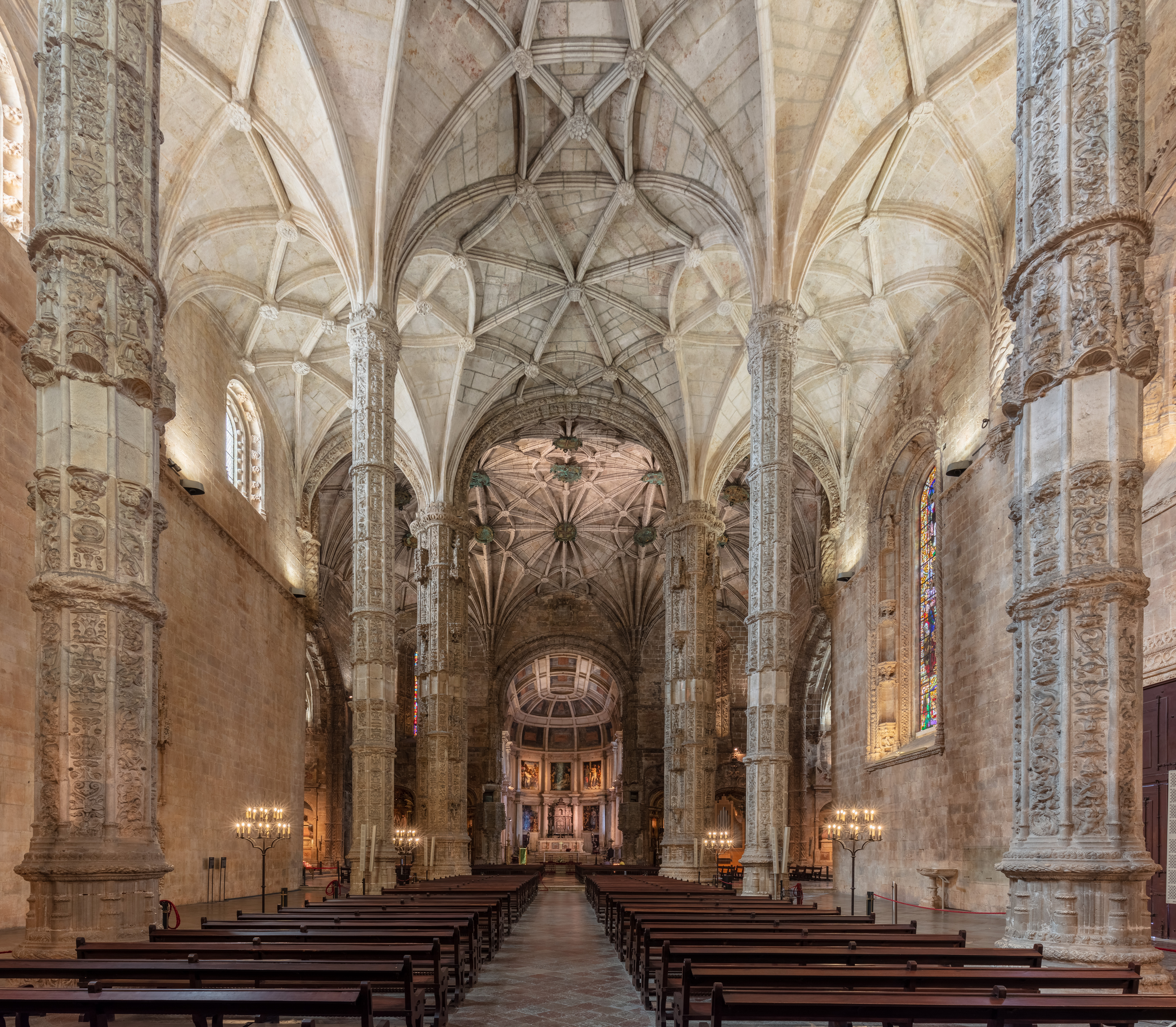
Manueline nave of the Jerónimos Monastery in Lisbon

One of the most important examples of Manueline style is the Jerónimos Monastery at Lisbon, in which Renaissance ornaments decorate portals, church columns and cloisters. The definitive abandonment of Gothic architecture and the first "pure" Renaissance structures appear later in the 16th century, under King John III, like the Chapel of Nossa Senhora da Conceição in Tomar (1532–40), the Porta Especiosa of Coimbra Cathedral and the Graça Church at Évora (c. 1530-1540), as well as the cloisters of the Cathedral of Viseu (c. 1528-1534) and Convent of Christ in Tomar (John III Cloisters, 1557–1591).

Manueline churches like that of Jerónimos Monastery anticipated the unification of inner space (see Hall Church) that would characterise Renaissance churches like the Mercy Church of Santarém (after 1559), the Santo Antão Church of Évora (1557–63) and the cathedrals of Leiria (after 1550) and Portalegre (after 1556).

São Roque Church (1565–87) and the Mannerist Monastery of São Vicente de Fora (1582–1629), both located in Lisbon, heavily influenced religious architecture in both Portugal and its colonies overseas in the next centuries. Mannerist churches influenced by these include the Jesuit churches of Coimbra (New Cathedral of Coimbra, started 1598) and Salvador da Bahia, in Brazil (now Cathedral of Salvador, second half of the 17th century).

== Secular architecture ==
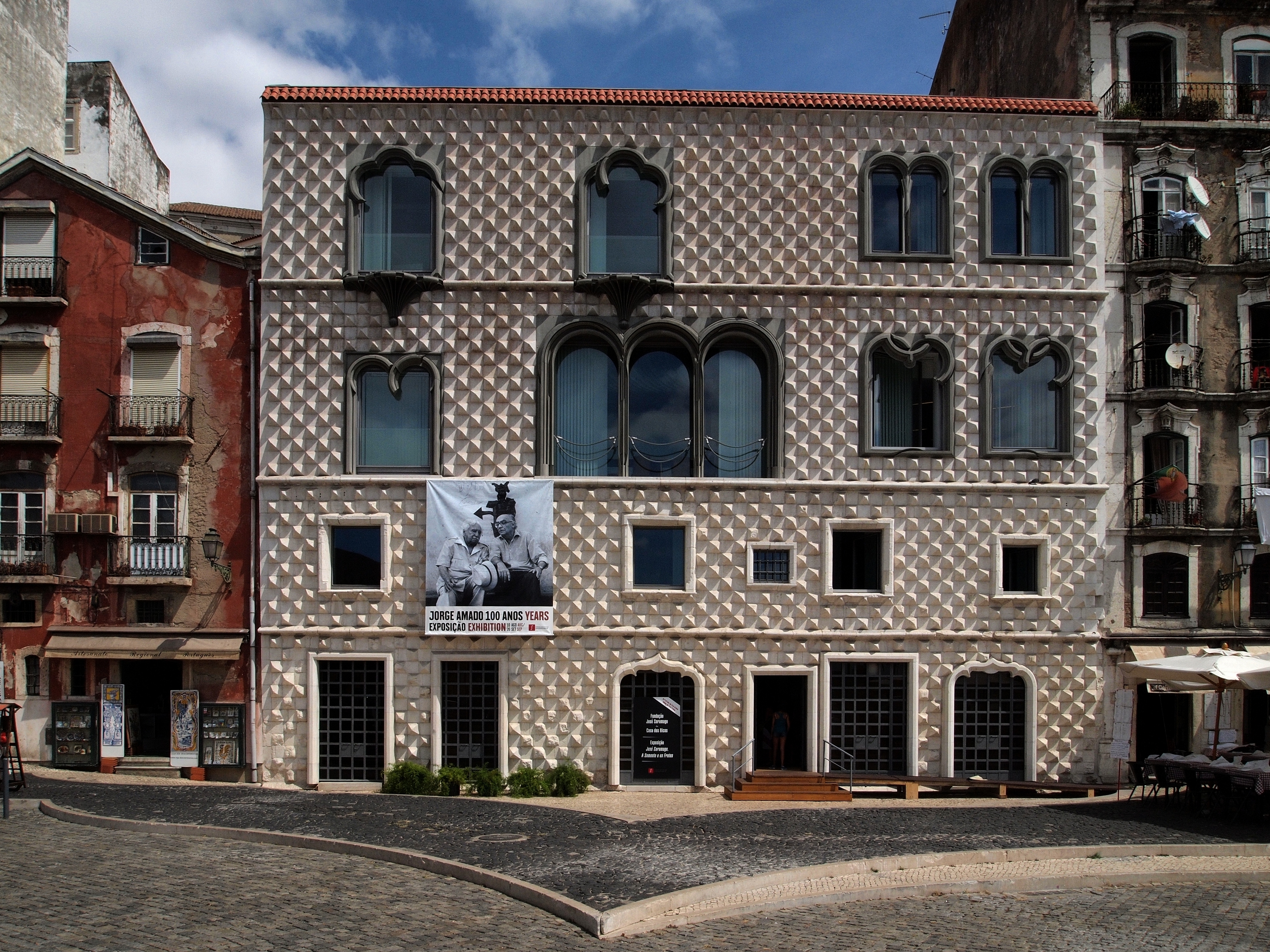
Casa dos Bicos, Lisbon

An important and rare example of urban palace of the Renaissance is the Casa dos Bicos (c. 1525) in Lisbon, with a façade covered with diamond reliefs in Italian fashion. During the first half of the 16th century, the Portuguese nobility built various quintas (manor houses) in the area surrounding Lisbon. Among these, the Quinta da Bacalhoa (1528–1554), near Setúbal, is the most important, although recently ruined and degraded after its sale to a winery. In contrast to Portuguese mediaeval palaces like the Royal Palace at Sintra, the façades of Bacalhoa have a symmetrical arrangement of windows, loggias and towers and the building is surrounded by an artificial lake and geometrical gardens, an ensemble that reveals Italian inspiration. Also near Setúbal is located the Quinta das Torres (c. 1560), also characterised by its symmetrical façades and a pavilion in the middle of its artificial lake.

The Ribeira Palace of Lisbon, a royal palace built in the early 16th century in Manueline style by King Manuel I, was remodelled towards the end of the 16th century by the orders of Philip I (Philip II of Spain). At this time the façade of the palace was modernised and a large Renaissance-style tower with a dome was built by the Tagus river. The palace and its prominent tower dominated the cityscape of Lisbon until 1755, when the Great Lisbon earthquake destroyed it. With the royal palace destroyed, perhaps the most important late Renaissance palace in Portugal is the Ducal Palace of Vila Viçosa, built between the late 16th and early 17th centuries for the Dukes of Braganza.

== Notable examples ==
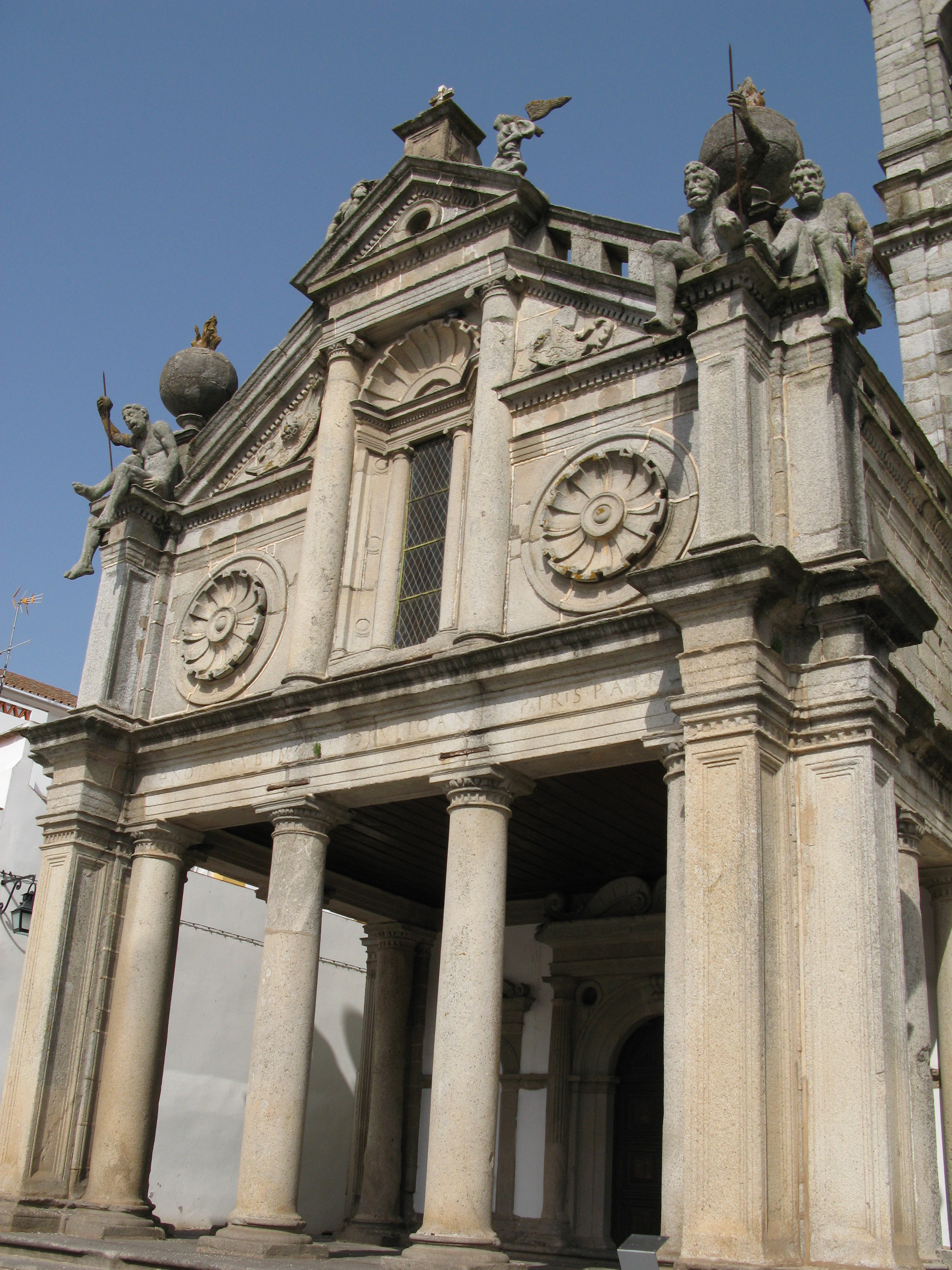
Façade of Graça Church in Évora (1530–40)

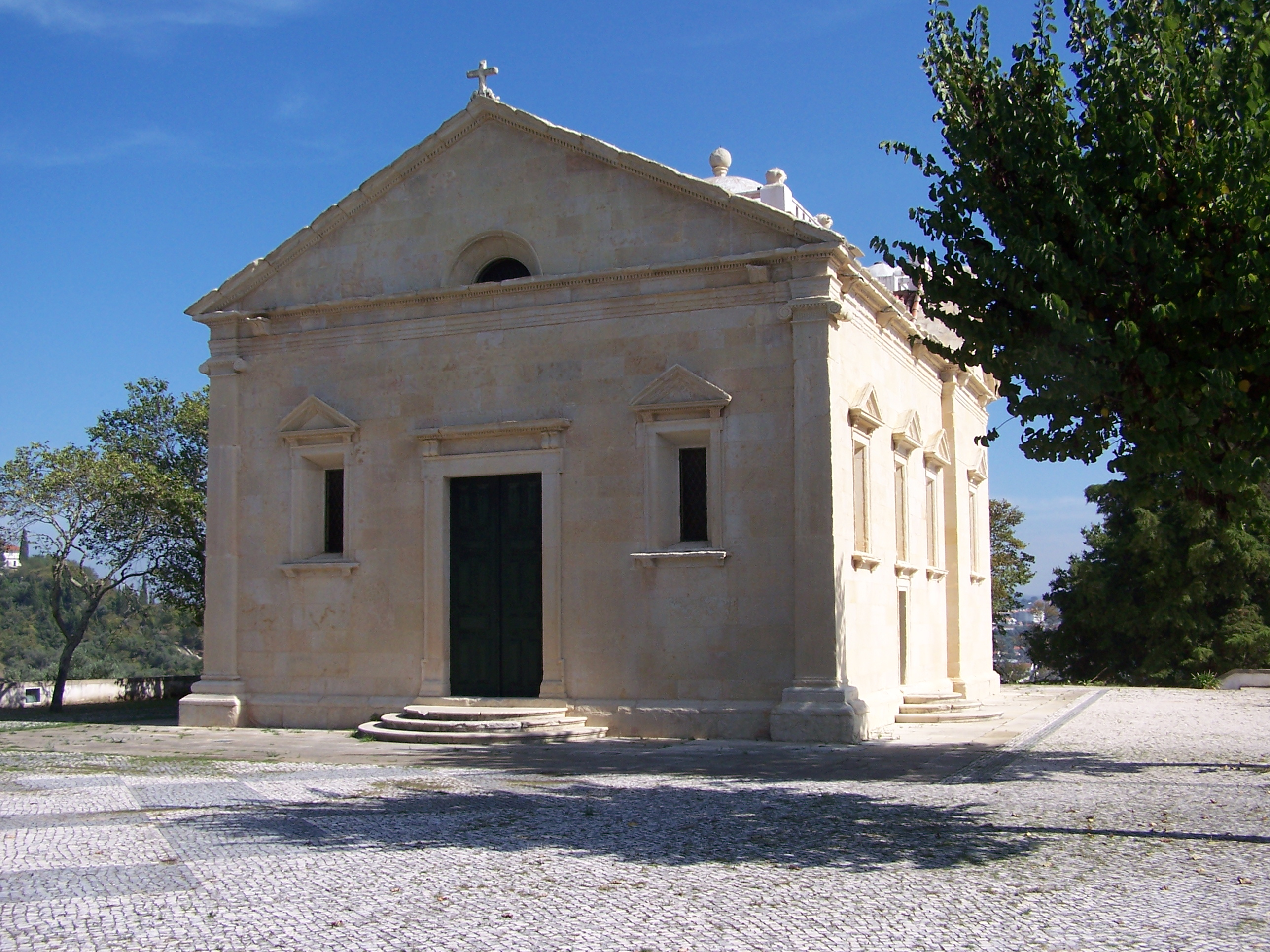
Chapel of Nossa Senhora da Conceição in Tomar (1532–40)

Cloisters of the Convent of Christ in Tomar (1557–1591)

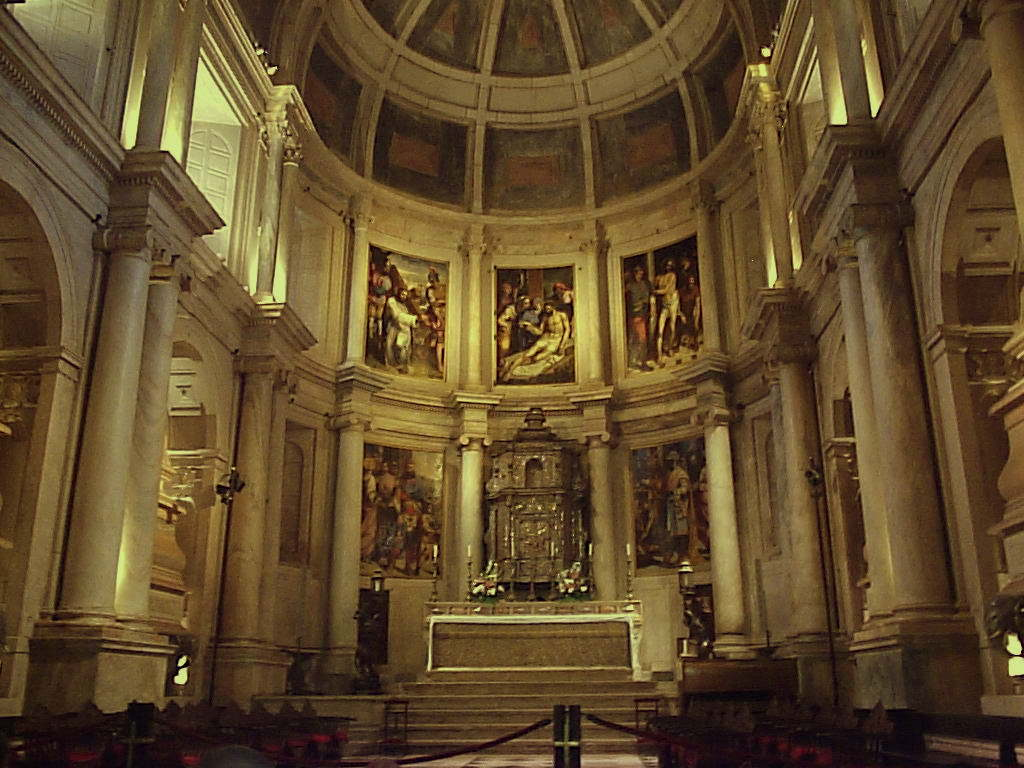
Main chapel of Jerónimos Monastery church (after 1563)

Interior of São Roque Church (1565–87) in Lisbon

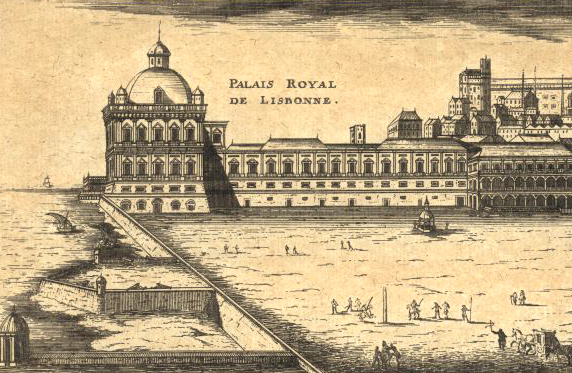
Ribeira Palace (16th century) of Lisbon on an 18th-century engraving

Mannerist façade of São Vicente de Fora in Lisbon (1582–1629)

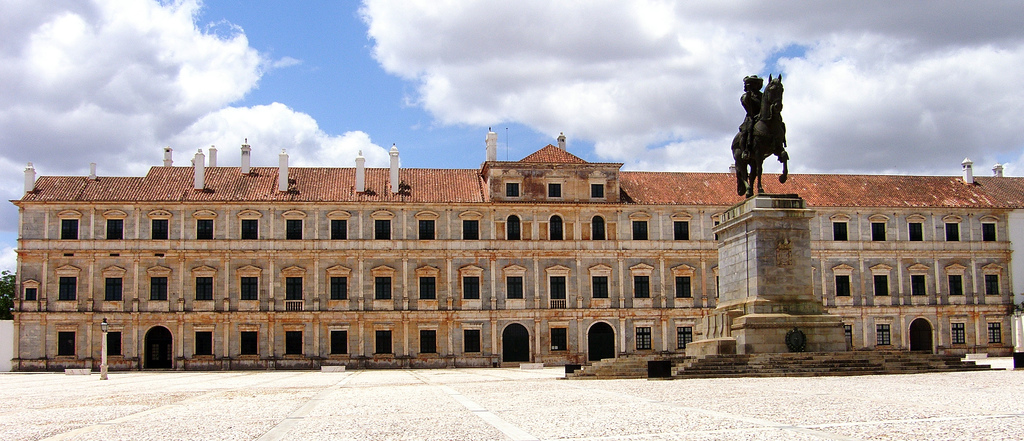
Ducal Palace of Vila Viçosa (late 16th-17th centuries)

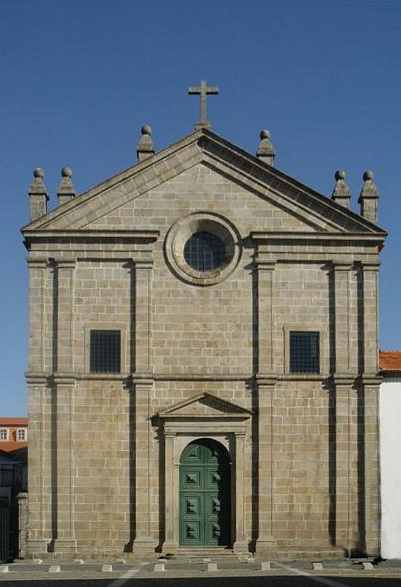
Saint Paul Church in Braga (after 1566)

Porta Especiosa of Coimbra Cathedral (1530s)

== See also ==
- Renaissance architecture
