= Church of Porto Covo =

- Church of Our Lady of Solitude
- Igreja de Porto Covo
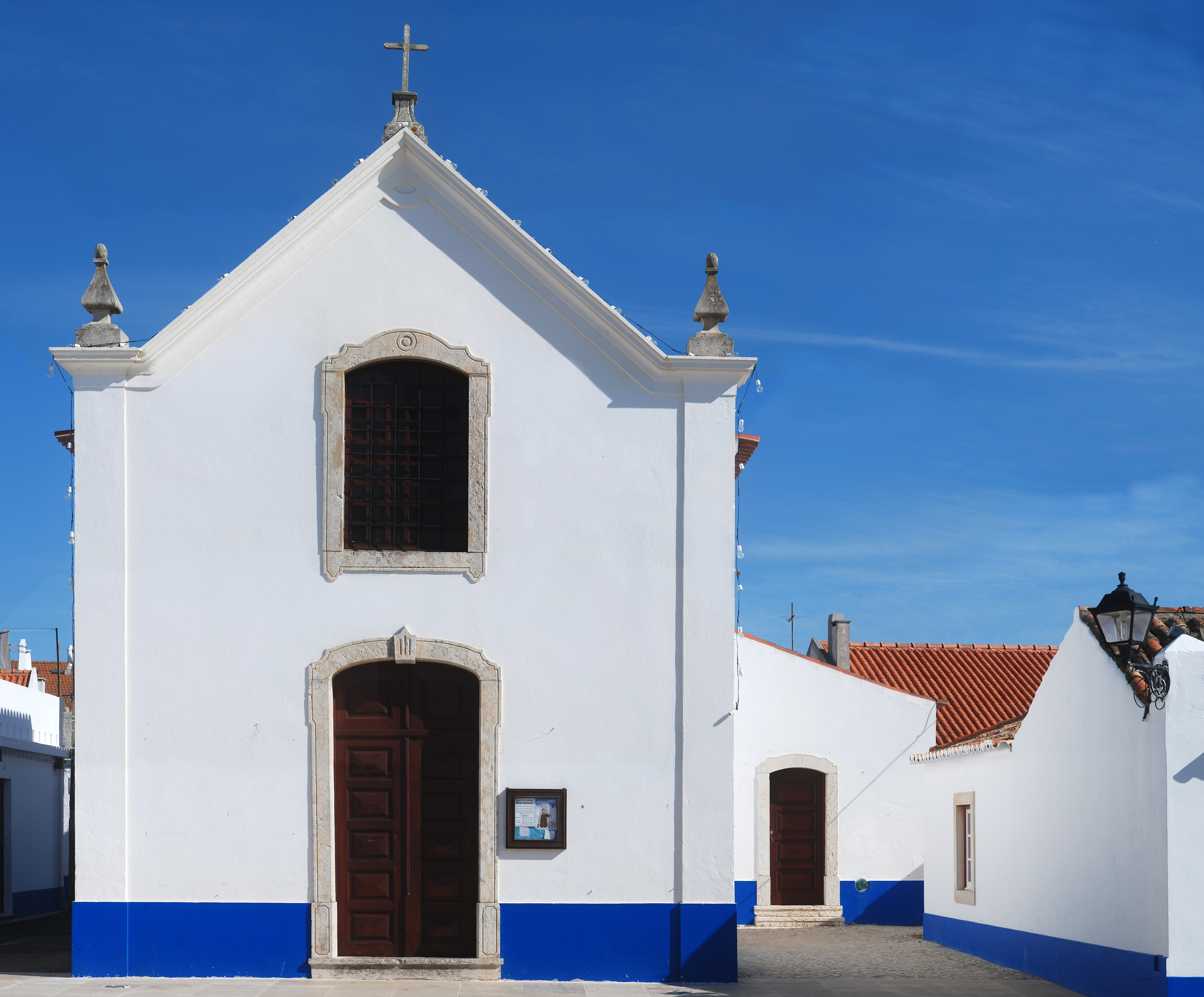
- The austere facade of the Baroque-style parochial church of Porto Covo
- Church of Porto Covo
- 37°51′5.05″N 8°47′29.71″W
- Location: Setúbal, Alentejo Litoral, Alentejo
- Country: Portugal

History
- Dedication: Porto Covo

Architecture
- Architect: Joaquim Guilherme d'Oliveira
- Style: Baroque, Neoclassic

Specifications
- Length: 14.90 m (48.9 ft)
- Width: 12.72 m (41.7 ft)

The Church of Porto Covo (Portuguese: Igreja de Porto Covo) is Baroque and Neoclassic church in the civil parish, municipality of Sines, in the Atlantic coast of the Portuguese Alentejo. The church's austere lines is a morphological hybridization of the styles employed during the reign of Queen Maria I. In the widespread typology of regional architecture, the Baroque elements are evident in the lintels and trim curves, framed in a composition that is, generally, more rigid then in the gable design.

== History ==
Around the end of the 18th century, the church was constructed within the remodelling of the Largo Marquês de Pombal by Joaquim Guilherme d'Oliveira.

== Architecture ==
The church is a rare example, important for the group details and composition, including pinnacles and triumphal arch, different from the vernacular characteristics of other temples of the same size in the region.

The church is located in the centre of a large square (Largo Marquês de Pombal), aligned with trees and a central garden. It has a longitudinal plan, formed of a nave and a narrower presbytery, with lateral sacristy and tiled articulated spaces. The principal facade is oriented towards the north, defined by accented corners, a finial gable crowned by a cross (resting on a plinth in masonry) and stone urns on plinths crowning the corners. The church portal is an arched frame, surmounted by a big window with ornate semi-circular frame. The lateral facades are simple with no doorways or windows.

=== Interior ===
The unique nave is covered in wood with three plans, with a lower footer in blue and white azulejo tile. Within this space, framed by the same portal and window, to the right, is a basin for holy water, while a triumphal arch framed in stonework, with pilasters and single step.

The presbytery is covered with vaulted-ceiling, with cornice, while the main altar is preceded by two steps and framed within a gilded retable. A central rounded niche is flanked by pilasters with volutes and upper architecture in multiple lobes, framed by a medallion with the monogram AM circled by glint and urns. On either side are corbels and false niches gilded and painted. On the left wall is a doorway to the sacristy.

The church is constructed of stone masonry and mortar primarily, plastered and whitewashed, with the portal and secondary elements in stone. In addition, the elements of the church include tile covering of straw, wood-lined ceilings with dome plastered and whitewashed, tiled floors, wooden window frames, gilded altarpiece and polychromatic tiles.
