= Pessegueiro Island =

Island in Portugal

Pessegueiro Island Ilha Pessegueiro
- Island
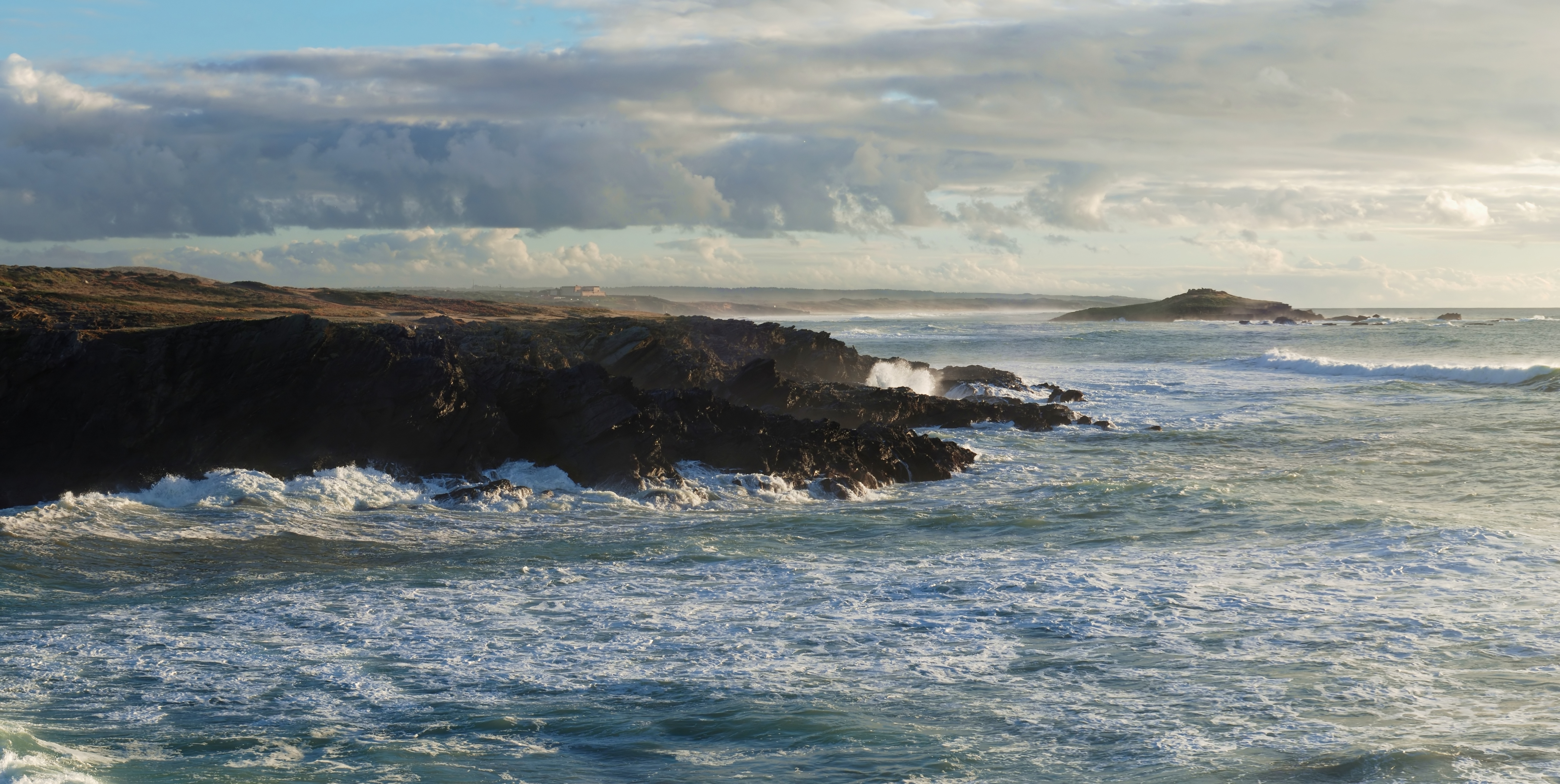
- The island of Pessegueiro as seen from the village of Porto Covo, during a winter storm
- Etymology: pessegueiro, Portuguese word for peachtree; literally "island of the peachtree"
- Interactive map of Pessegueiro Island
- Country: Portugal
- Region: Alentejo
- Subregion: Alentejo Litoral
- Municipality: Sines
- Ethnic groups: Portuguese
- Statistics from INE (2001); geographic detail from Instituto Geográfico Português (2010)

Pessegueiro Island (Portuguese: Ilha do Pessegueiro), literally island of the Peachtree, is a small island/islet located along the southwest coast of the civil parish of Porto Covo in the municipality of Sines. The island and the adjacent coast are part of Southwest Alentejo and Vicentine Coast Natural Park, but Pessegueiro island is also notable for the 15th-16th century fort located at its centre and Roman ruins along the coast.

== History ==
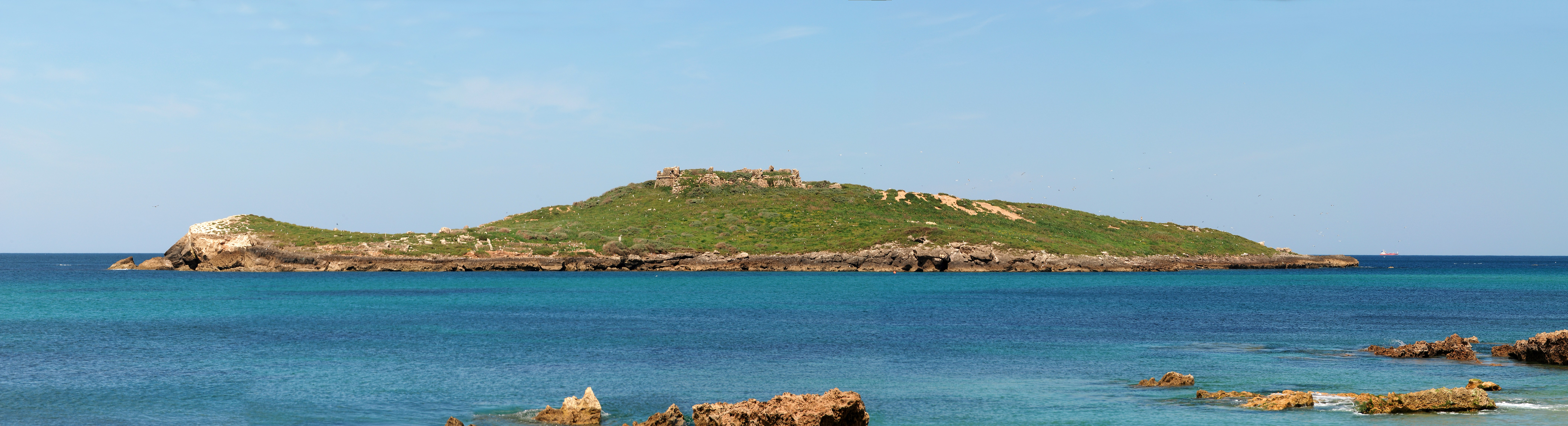
Pessegueiro Island, view from the east

Historically, the island was first occupied by the Carthaginians before the Second Punic War (218-202 BCE).

At the time of the Roman conquest of Hispania, the island hosted a small fish processing centre, as determined by archaeological excavations which discovered the remains of salt tanks along the southern coast.

To help defend against privateers, the natural anchorage was extended at the time of the Iberian Union with an artificial rock barrier connecting the island of Pessegueiro to the coastline. In 1590, construction began on the Fort of Pessegueiro Island, which came to occupy a dominant position on the island, with the purpose of providing military support to a fort on the mainland. Work on the project was halted in 1598 in order to construct the Fort of Vila Nova de Milfontes.

=== The legend of Our Lady of Queimada ===
According to tradition, in the middle of the 18th century, Barbary pirates arriving on the island from Algeria and Morocco encountered a Christian hermit who was maintaining a chapel dedicated to the Virgin Mary. The pirates killed the monk, looted the chapel and threw her statue into the flames.

Later the inhabitants of Porto Covo buried the Christian hermit, but could not, at first, find the sacred image. Deciding to search the entire island, they finally found the statue within a burned bush but unharmed by the fire: the image became known as the Queimada (Burnt Virgin). The statue was removed to the mainland, one kilometre from the island, where a new chapel was built, known as the Chapel of the Burned Virgin (Portuguese: Capela de Nossa Senhora da Queimada), becoming a destination for pilgrimages.

== Geography ==
Located 300 metres (330 yd) from the coast by a channel, it is situated south of the parish seat of Porto Covo, southwest of a small inlet used by fishing boats.

Part of the Southwest Alentejo and Vicentine Coast Natural Park it is migratory stop and hatchery for many marine bird species, some on the verge of extinction, including seagulls, cormorants and carrion crows.

== Fort of Pessegueiro Island ==
Fort of Pessegueiro Island
- Forte da Ilha do Pessegueiro
- Setúbal, Alentejo Litoral, Alentejo in Portugal
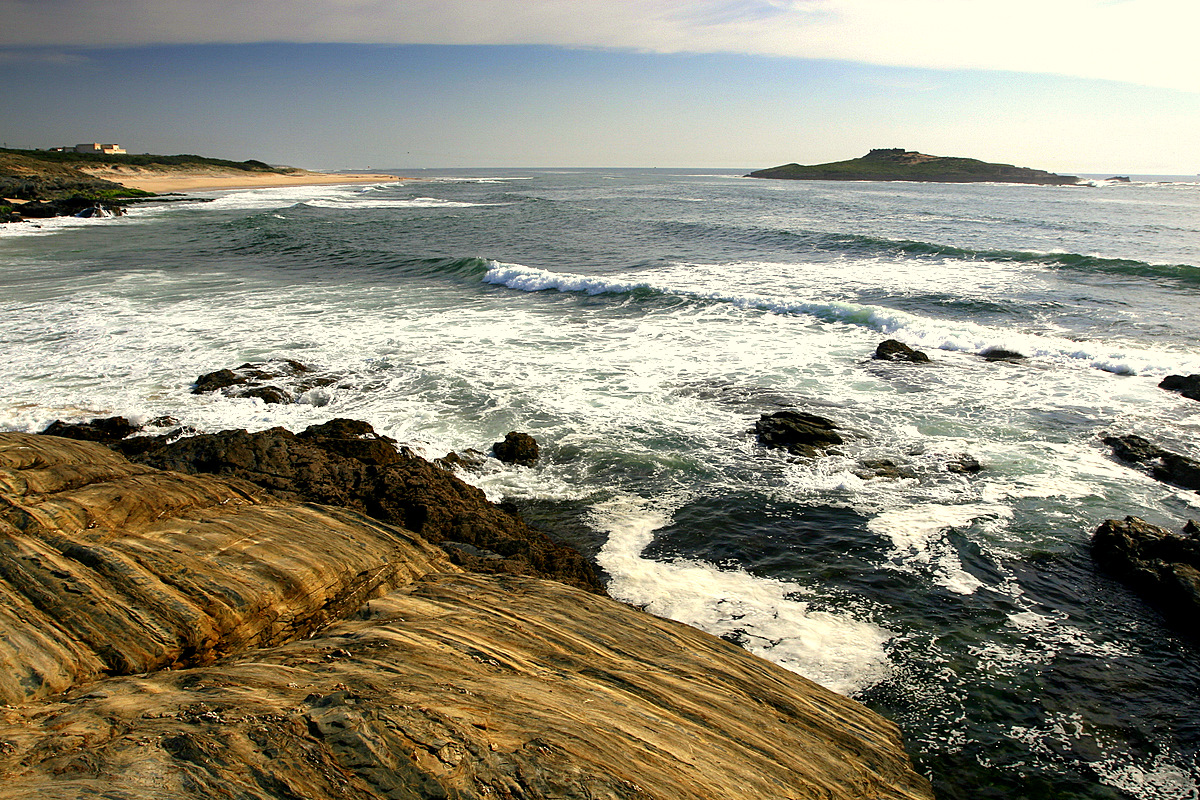
- The Fort of Pessegueiro Island across the 300 metre channel from the Fort of Pessegueiro Beach

Site information
- Type: Fort
- Owner: Portuguese Republic
- Open to the public: Public

Location
- Location of the Fort of Pessegueiro Island
- Coordinates: 37°50′0.57″N 8°47′51.22″W

Site history
- Built: c. 1588
- Materials: Ashlar Masonry, Stone

The Fort of Pessegueiro Island (Portuguese: Forte da ilha do Pessegueiro) is a fort situated on the island of Pessegueiro, off the coast of the civil parish of Porto Covo, municipality of Sines, in the southern Alentejo of Portugal.

There are still visible on the island of Pessegueiro enormous blocks cut from the rocks of the island, and sunk in the waters around it. Similarly, there have been discovered various tanks for salting fish, that were used during the early Roman occupation of the region. These tanks were used in the salting and processing of fish, which was traded and transported to Rome.

In 1588, Terzi began the planning for a fort on the island, as part of a project to construct an artificial port that would link the island to the coast (then approved by cardinal Alberto, the vice-King). Alexandre Massay substituted Terzi in 1590, beginning the construction of the port, while work on the artificial port continued. The construction was interrupted in 1598, when Massay was transferred to Vila Nova de Milfontes, to begin work on the construction of a fort to defend the inlet to the River Mira.

Construction began once again in 1603, but were interrupted shortly later. It is unclear, but construction on the island was likely completed between 1661 and 1690, although the fort and artificial port remained incomplete.

The 1755 Lisbon earthquake was responsible for damage to the chapel, and the batteries over the casemates.

=== Architecture ===
Of the fort that remains on the island, the existing structure exists in ruins. It is a star-shaped fort, consisting of four symmetrical, triangular bulwarks and with casemates in the central part of the fortification. On the opposite end of the main entrance is a hermitage, dedicated to Santo Alberto (Portuguese: Ermida de Santo Alberto).

The fort was part of group that included an artificial port, defended by a breakwater also connected the island to the rocky outcroppings to the north of the island: the Penedo do Cavalo.

== Sources ==
- Callixto, Carlos (3 October 1981), O Forte de Porto Covo (in Portuguese), O Dia
- Callixto, Carlos (21 September 1984), O Forte de Porto Covo (in Portuguese), Diário de Notícias
- Falcão, José António (1987), Memória paroquial do Concelho de Sines (in Portuguese), Santiago do Cacém, Portugal
- Mendes, João (5 May 1990), Pessegueiro em perigo (in Portuguese), Sábado
- Soledade, Arnaldo (1990), Sines: terra de Vasco da Gama, Sines
- Callixto, Carlos (23 February 1991), O Forte de Porto Covo (in Portuguese), Diário de Notícias
