= Porto Covo =

- Civil parish
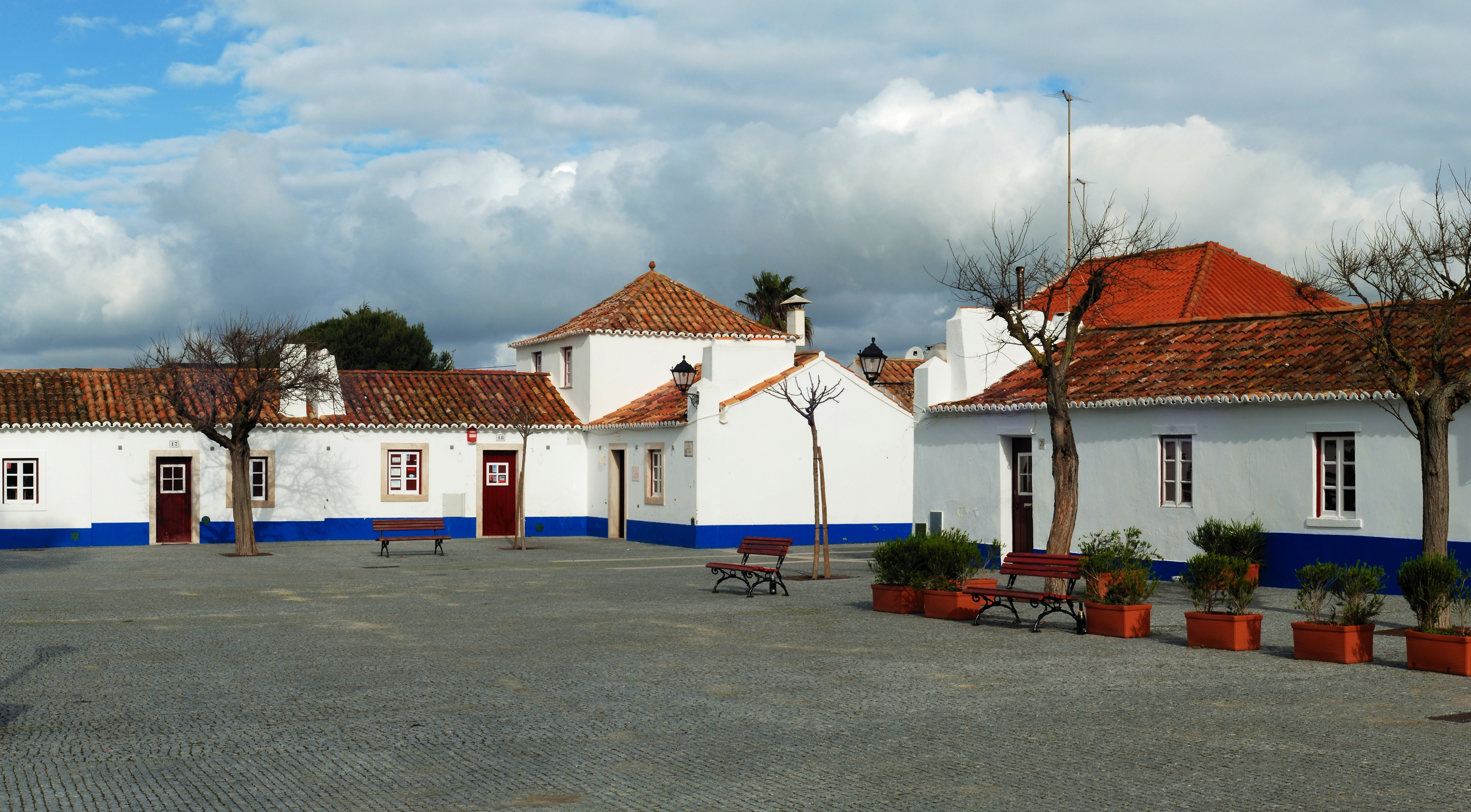
- The old quarter, around the Praça Marquês de Pombal

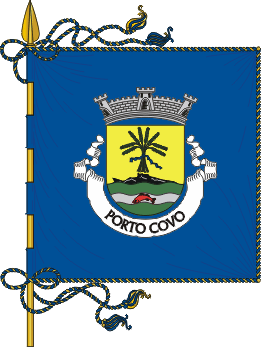
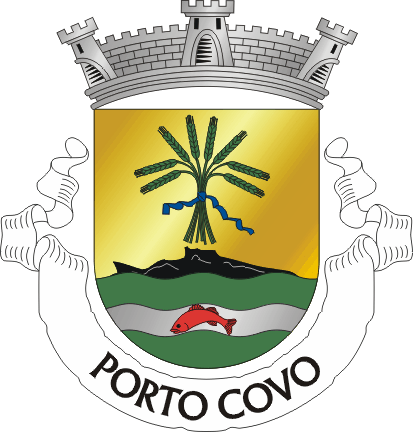
- Flag Coat of arms

- Coordinates: 37.852°N 8.792°W
- Country: Portugal
- Region: Alentejo
- Intermunic. comm.: Alentejo Litoral
- District: Setúbal
- Municipality: Sines

Area
  - Total: 50.72 km^{2} (19.58 sq mi)
- Elevation: 25 m (82 ft)

Population (2011)
  - Total: 1,038
  - Density: 20.47/km^{2} (53.00/sq mi)
- Time zone: UTC+00:00 (WET)
  - Summer (DST): UTC+01:00 (WEST)
- Postal code: 7520
- Area code: 269
- Patron: Nossa Senhora da Soledade
- Website: http://www.fportocovo.pt/

Porto Covo is one of the two civil parishes in the municipality of Sines, located along the western Alentejo coast of Portugal, about 170 km (110 mi) south of Lisbon. The population in 2011 was 1,038, in an area of 50.72 km^{2}. Known for its beaches and ties to the ocean, the name Porto Covo likely translates as port of the covos, the term covo referring to a fishing net, used for capturing lobsters and crabs.

== History ==
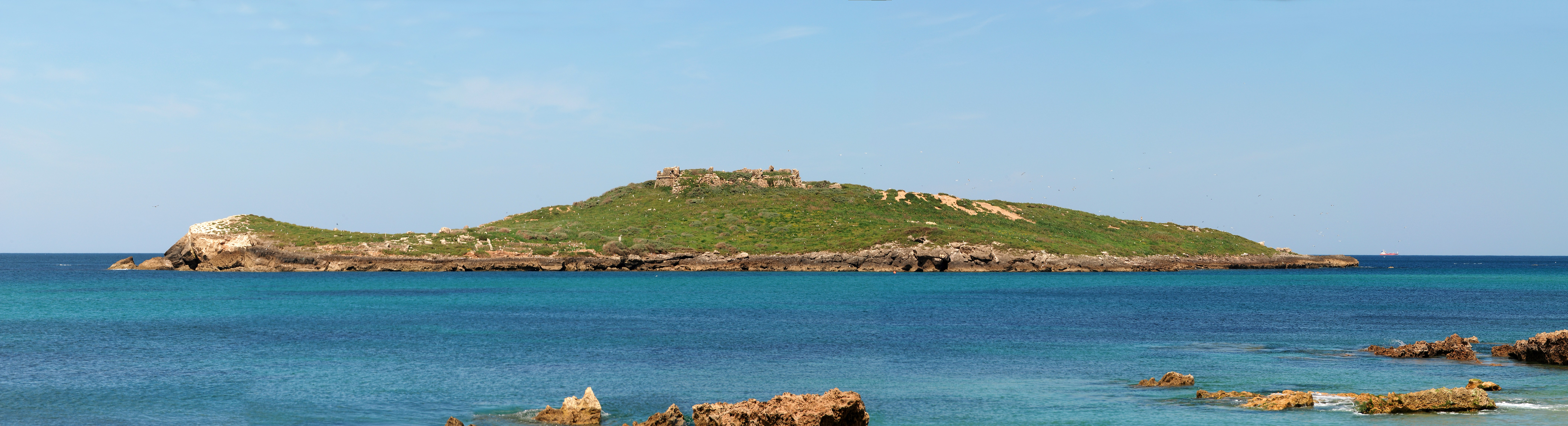
The island of Pessegueiro one of the first centres of activity in the region, leading back to the Carthaginian and Roman trade and commerce

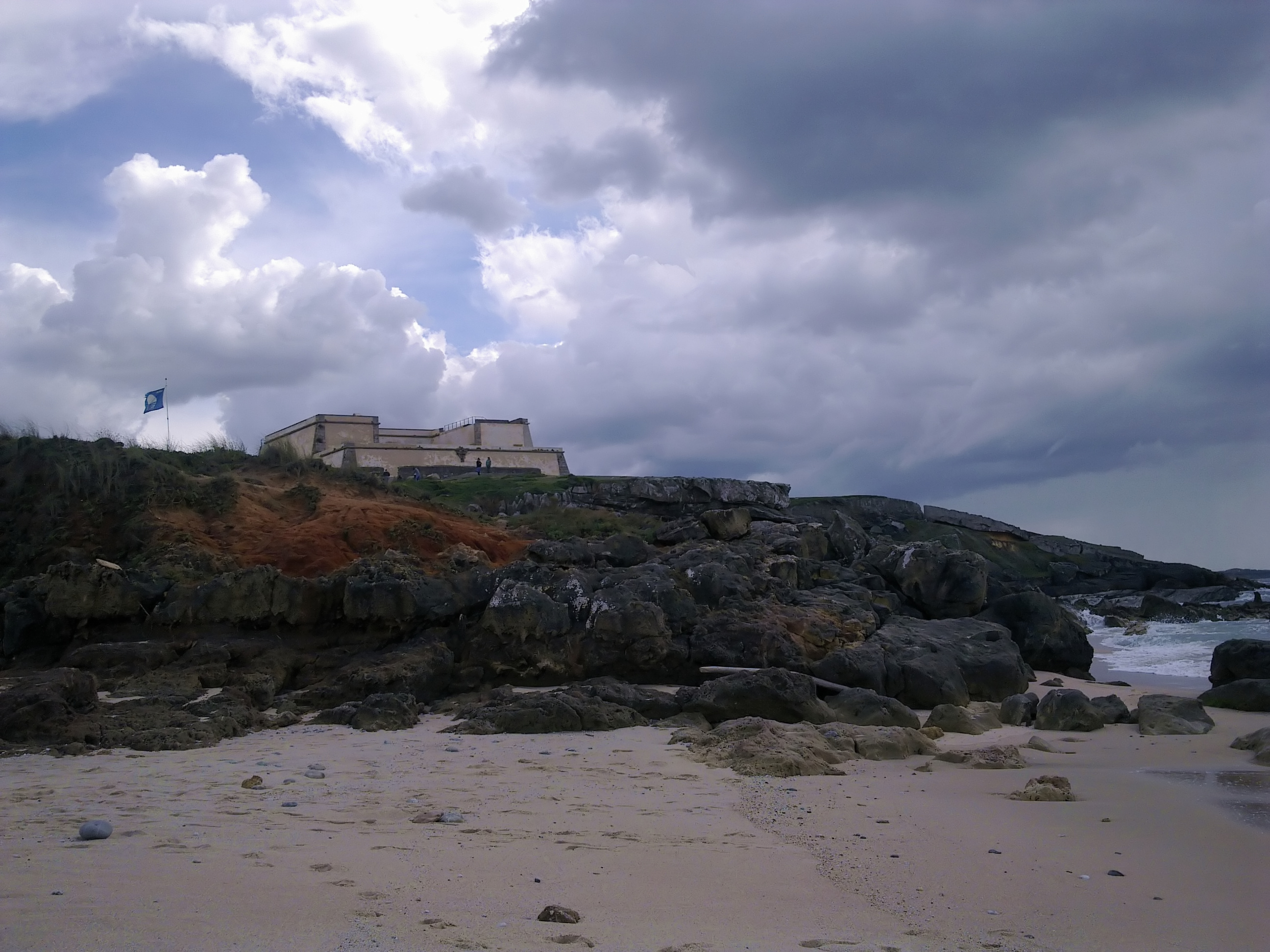
The Forte da Ilha de Dentro along the beach of Pessegueiro

The earliest record of human settlement in the area of Porto Covo dates to the Carthaginian trading along the coast. By the time of the conquest of Hispania by Rome, the island of Pessegueiro hosted a small fish processing centre (from archaeological excavation of salt tanks linked to this industry).

The parish of Porto Covo, by the middle of the 18th century, was nothing more than a small coastal settlement around a beach and small cove. Its small dimensions was reflected in the number of homes, which numbered only four by 1780. On the island of Pessegueiro, King Philip II of Spain hoped to found a maritime port to support his claim to the territory and defend against marauding pirates. At that time an artificial rock barrier was constructed to connect the island of Pessegueiro to the coastline. Two forts were constructed on the island, supporting small garrisons to watch over the coast, but today in ruins.

Still in the 18th century, the community of Porto Covo began to become an anchorage for the small fishing boats and small businesses. Yet, even these activities were limited, due to the climatic and ocean conditions which limited the port's accessibility. During these periods, it was difficult entering the cove and, in periods when storms came from the southwest, it was not safe attempting landfall on the island of Pessegueiro.

The area began to occupy an important role after the capitalist Jacinto Fernandes Bandeira, a member of a merchant classes of the capital appeared around the late part of the 18th century. Born on 28 April 1745, he came from a poor family in Viana do Castelo, working for family in the capital, succeeding and becoming wealthy under the government of the Marquess de Pombal: in 1768, at the age of 23, his was a member of the Inquisition; in 1774, he was made a knight in the Order of Christ; and in 1792, he was a secretary, deputy and, later, inspector in the Junta de Comérico (Commission for Commerce). He began using the stylized Bandeira to his name, after being born along the Rua da Bandeira in Viana do Castelo. With his career in ascendancy, Jacinto Fernandes began collecting aristocratic titles, such as the Loyal Knight of the Royal House (Fidalgo Cavaleiro da Casa Real), in 1794. He obtained the right to use the name Senhor de Porto Covo after 13 June 1796, for "his activity to promote the establishment and settlement of Porto Covo, to benefit agriculture, fishing and promotion of the Corte, in addition to diverse commissions in which he held with satisfaction". He realized his project to establish a permanent settlement in Porto Covo, by producing two plans (now archived in the Torre do Tombo National Archive. Jacinto Fernandes became the alcalde of Vila Nova de Milfontes on 14 November 1802 and later the council to the Royal Finances. He was given the title of Baron of Porto Covo on 15 August 1805.

While he lived Jacinto Fernandes Bandeira strove to grow the community, a fact that did not influence his successors, following his death on 30 May 1806. A bachelor, he left his enormous fortune to his two nephews, children of his sister, Maria Josefa Cristina Bandeira. It was the eldest nephew, Jacinto Fernandes da Costa Bandeira, that inherited the majority from his uncle, succeeding his uncle as the alcalde of Vila Nova de Milfontes, and second Baron of Porto Covo on 26 February 1822. For his contribution to the Crown, he went as far as Minister for Finances and President of the Bank of Lisbon, eventually achieving the title of Viscount of Porto Covo da Bandeira on 15 September 1843. By this time, Porto Covo had little more than 20 residences: little more than the original nucleus left behind on the death of the first Baron. Porto Covo never really achieved an important place along the Alentejo coast. The area on which it was located remained unsettled; the area between Sines and the River Mira were likely destinations for fishermen and traders then the village. Fishing tended to remain archaic and never really commercialized by its population.

Demographically, by 1940, Porto Covo had little more than 55 residences, comprising 246 inhabitants. After 1980 the numbers had grown significantly: 194 residences, comprising 539 inhabitants. Its growth was, in some part, achieved through the development of the Sines Industrial Complex and container port.

Porto Covo became a civil parish on 31 December 1984, that included the island of Pessegueiro.

== Geography ==
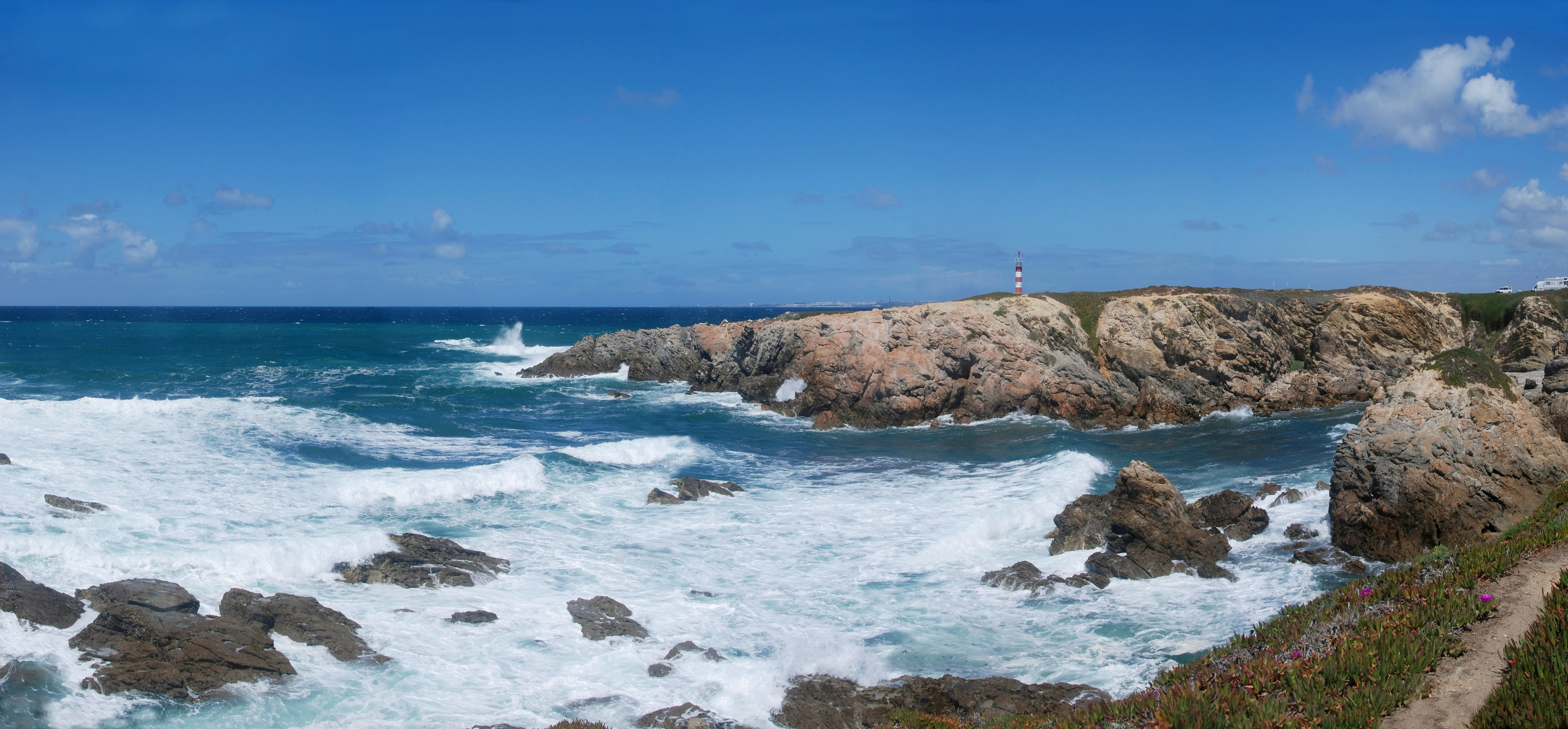
The Atlantic Ocean, as seen from Porto Covo

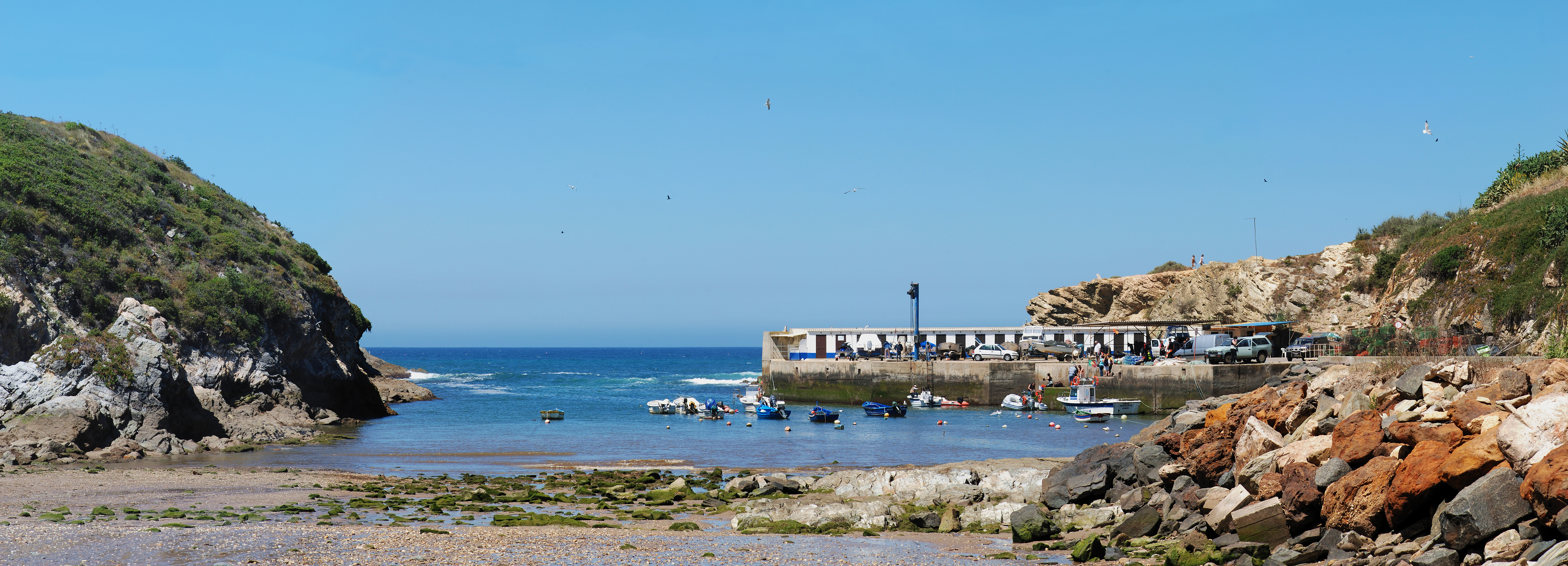
The port of Porto Covo, view from the East

The civil parish of Porto Covo has 48.73 km^{2} (18.81 mi^{2}) of area, and today includes 1400 inhabitants (based on 2008 census). A coastal parish, it is located about 13 km (8.1 mi) south of the municipal seat Sines, but comprises an interior catchment that extends seven kilometres into the interior. While it is fronted to its north by the civil parish of Sines, it is surrounded to the west by the civil parish of Cercal (in Santiago do Cacém municipality) and south by the civil parish of Vila Nova de Milfontes (in Odemira municipality).

Its northern frontier extends from the beach of Vieirinha into the interior, until reaching the IC4 motorway (each of Brejos do Morgave) and extending south to the village of Sonega. Its eastern border with Cercal meanders along the foothills until southeast of Herdade da Cabeça da Cabra, before the border joins that of the civil parish of Vila de Milfontes meandering west (following the Ribeira da Azenha) reaching the coast 1.5 kilometres south of the island of Pessegueiro. The space includes, apart from the town of Porto Covo, several other localities, including: Barradinha, Brejos do Morgave, Caeiro, Cabeça da Cabra, Camarneira, Casa Nova, Fonte do Muro, Fonte Nova, Foros da Pouca Farinha, Herdade de Cabeça da Cabra, Monte das Pias and Vale Travesso. The area is part of the Southwest Alentejo and Vicentine Coast Natural Park consisting of protected landscapes and habitats for migratory and endemic species.

The original projects for the community never materialized in the plans of Henrique Guilherme de Oliveira. Rather than a seaside settlement, the architect laid-down the settlement further to the interior, mindful of the farmers distance from their lands. The square, although simple, developed from the original plans of the Pombaline-era architects that favoured a visible square grid and squares, the repetition in the facades, the volume and rhythm of the groups of buildings (including the placement of the structures, such as the church).

== Economy ==
Although characterized as a "small fishing community", its move towards the tourist market has driven its growth since the 1990s. Influenced by its white, fine sand beaches, natural rock-cliff shores, secluded coves and warm temperatures (water temperatures reaching a minimum 15 °C), the local economy absorves a constant number of summer visitors and foreign vacationers. During the summer the population increases ten-fold with visitors, who occupy vacation homes, rented apartments and campgrounds, helped by the classification of many of its beaches as Blue Flag beaches, including the popular Praia do Espingardeiro, Praia Pequena and Praia dos Buizinhos. In front of the island of Pessegueiro is one of the more popular beaches, attracting windsurfers, boaters and sport fishermen to the waters off the coast. Alongside the beach of Pessegueiro is the 17th-century fortress, partially destroyed by the 1755 Lisbon earthquake. On the island of Pessegueiro, which inspired the contemporary musician Rui Veloso to pen a composition, is another 17th-century fortress, the ruins of a Roman porto and 15th-century chapel. These have also attracted visitors, as boats regularly visit the island for visits, or fishing around its waters.

== Architecture ==
=== Civic ===
- Historic Centre of Porto Covo (Núcleo urbano da povoação de Porto Côvo/Aldeia de Porto Côvo), that includes the Praça Marques de Pombal square and the buildings in its vicinity;

=== Military ===
- Fort of Pessegueiro (Forte do Pessegueiro), located on the beach of Pessegueiro, a 15th-16th century military fortification, consisting of star-shaped bulwarks surmounted by a platform that held canons, in addition to casemates and chapel;
- Fort of Pessegueiro Island (Forte na Ilha do Pessegueiro), comparable to the Pessegueiro beach fortification, the fortress on the island is in a greater deal of ruin, owing to its location on the island. Constructed during the 15th-16th century it includes casemates and chapel, as well as triangular bulwarks;

=== Religious ===
- Church of Porto Covo (Igreja de Porto Covo), a Baroque and Neoclassical church comprising austere lines and hybrid morphology from the reign of Queen Maria I of Portugal typical of the regional style;
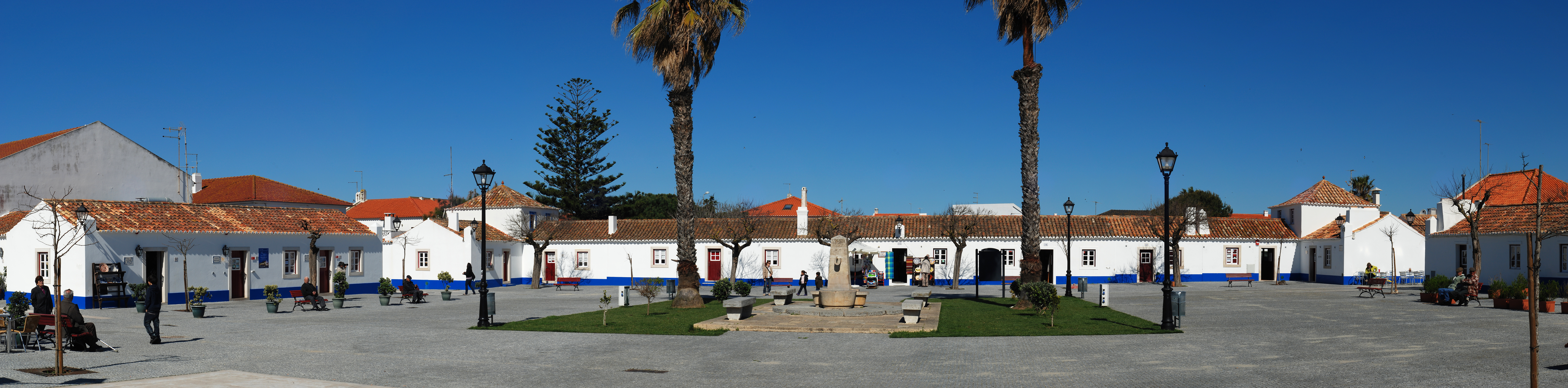
The main square of Porto Covo, the Praça Marquês de Pombal, planned by Jacinto Fernandes Bandeira, first Baron of Porto Covo at the end of the 18th century, following the regular grid-pattern of the post-1755 Pombaline design aesthetic

== Culture ==
The parish is highlighted by their three-day long (August 28–30) religious festival in honour of Nossa Senhora da Soledade (Our Lady of Solitude), marked by spectacles, dances, concerts and traditional fireworks.
