= Filippo Terzi =

Italian military architect and engineer

Cloister of João III, Convento de Cristo, in a crisply articulated Serlian style

Filippo Terzi (1520–1597) was an Italian military and civil architect and engineer, born in Bologna, who went to Lisbon in 1577 and the following year joined the disastrous military expedition to Morocco where he was taken prisoner at the Battle of Alcácer Quibir. After this, his release was negotiated and he returned to Portugal, where he spent the remainder of his career, dying at Setúbal.

In 1582 Philip II of Spain, recently declared king also of Portugal, visited Setúbal, where Terzi was recommended to him on the occasion of a new fortification needed to reinforce the security of that port city. Having achieved the work successfully, Terzi was named master of works at the Convento de Cristo in Tomar, in 1584.

In 1590, he was named Mestre das Obras de el-Rei, "Master of the King's works", succeeding the post that had been occupied by António Rodrigues. Terzi was also charged with the instruction of a new generation of young architects in the Royal Works. He was responsible for numerous projects, notably at Coimbra and Lisbon, including the aqueduct that led from São Sebastião to Coimbra. He was likely the architect of the College of Santo Agostinho in Coimbra, although the extent of his contribution is disputed today.

== Selected works ==
- Convento de Cristo, Tomar: cloister
- church of São Vincente de Fora, Lisbon (1582–1605)
- Fort of Pessegueiro (1588–90), a coastal fortress in which the island of Pessegueiro was linked to the mainland
- Fort of Santiago da Barra in Monserrate (Viana do Castelo)
- Fort of São Filipe de Setúbal (1597) was in progress when he died.
- Igreja de São Roque (Lisbon) (Church of São Roque); completed the construction, including the roof
- Villa Miralfiore in Pesaro; designed entrance gates (triumphal arches)
