= Nicholas (bishop of Silves and Viseu) =

Nicholas (died 1213) was the bishop of Silves (1189–1191) and bishop of Viseu (1192–1213) during the Portuguese Reconquista.

A native of Flanders and a clergyman, Nicholas joined an international maritime expedition intending to take part in the Third Crusade. His fleet assisted King Sancho I of Portugal in besieging Silves from 21 July to 3 September 1189. After the fall of Silves, according to an eyewitness account, the De itinere navali, the newly appointed Portuguese governor named Nicholas bishop. Some of his fellow Flemings opted to remain in Silves with him while the rest of the crusaders continued on to the Holy Land. The governor, however, asked Nicholas to intercede and convince the crusaders to help him take Faro. He was unable to secure general agreement and the attack did not take place.

According to Ralph of Diceto, only five days after the city fell, on the Nativity of Mary (8 September), Nicholas dedicated the mosque as the cathedral of the Blessed Virgin. The names of three members of his chapter are known: William the dean, Peter the treasurer and Lambert the archdeacon. They may have been among those Flemings who chose to stay with him in Silves. William was sent to Flanders to recruit settlers for the new diocese.

Before the end of the year 1189, Nicholas had received several privileges from King Sancho and a villa at Mafra. In December, he witnessed the king's donation of the castle of Alvor to the monastery of Santa Cruz de Coimbra. In March 1190, at Sancho's request, he granted canonical jurisdiction over the castle of Lagos to the monastery of São Vicente de Fora, the king having already granted the castle to the monastery. That summer, the Almohads besieged Silves. According to Roger of Howden, when a ship bearing English crusaders arrived, Nicholas begged them to take part in the city's defence. The citizens went further and scuttled their ship. After they were promised a replacement ship, they agreed to join the defence. The Almohads ultimately lifted the siege.

In February 1191, Nicholas witnessed a royal donation to the monastery of Alcobaça. That summer, the Almohads returned and once again besieged Silves, which surrendered on 25 July. A year later, on 7 July 1192, Bishop João Peres of Viseu died. Before the month was out, Nicholas had been appointed his replacement. His activities at Viseu can be traced in six documents between February 1196 and December 1210.

Nicholas died on 25 October 1213 or possibly 1214.

== Bibliography ==
- David, Charles Wendell (1939). "Narratio de Itinere Navali Peregrinorum Hierosolymam Tendentium et Silviam Capientium, A.D. 1189". Proceedings of the American Philosophical Society. 81 (5): 591–676. JSTOR 985010.
- Lay, Stephen (2009). The Reconquest Kings of Portugal: Political and Cultural Reorientation on the Medieval Frontier. Palgrave Macmillan.
- Loud, Graham A., ed. (2010). The Crusade of Frederick Barbarossa: The History of the Expedition of the Emperor Frederick and Related Texts. Ashgate.
- Ventura, Leontina; Cunha Matos, João da, eds. (2010). Diplomatário da Sé de Viseu (1078–1278). IEM–CHSC–IUC.
