= Alvor =

Alvor may refer to:

- Alvor (Portimão), a civil parish in the municipality of Portimão, Portugal
- Alvor Castle, a castle in the parish of Alvor, district of Faro, Portugal
