= Raid on Silves (1197) =

Crusade in Iberia (1197)

- Part of the Crusade of 1197
Date	June/July 1197
Location	Silves, Portugal

Belligerents
Holy Roman Empire	Almohad Caliphate

Commanders and leaders
Hartwig of Bremen; Henry I of Brabant; Henry V of the Rhine	Yaqub al-Mansur

Strength
~44 ships ~3,000 troops	Unknown

Casualties and losses
Unknown	Unknown

The raid on Silves was an attack by the German Crusade on the Almohad city of Silves in 1197.

== Background ==
In 1189, the Portuguese led by King Sancho I of Portugal, with the help of the crusaders from northern Europe who were joining the Third Crusade, captured Silves from the Almohads. The Almohads responded with a major campaign between 1190 and 1191, managing to retake Silves and other cities. In 1197, the Emperor Henry VI launched a new crusade towards the Holy Land.

== Raid ==
One contingent of crusaders, approximately 3,000 strong, journeyed by sea towards the Holy Land. According to Arnold of Lübeck's Chronica Slavorum, the fleet had 44 ships. It sailed in mid-May, stopping in Dartmouth and also in Normandy. According to the Chronica of Roger of Howden, the crusaders were part of the emperor's army and came from Germany and "other lands". They were led by Archbishop Hartwig of Bremen, Duke Henry I of Brabant and Count Henry V of the Rhine. These crusaders may have considered the sea route preferable to a crossing of the Alps or else may have sought to distance themselves from the emperor.

Arriving in Lisbon in mid-June, Hartwig was honorably received by Bishop Soeiro Anes. After reaching the Gharb al-Andalus, the crusaders launched an attack on Silves. The only source for the raid on Silves is Roger of Howden, although the German sea crusade is also mentioned in the Chronica Regia Coloniensis and the Annales Stadenses. There was no Portuguese involvement in the attack on Silves, possibly because Sancho I had signed the peace treaty with Caliph Yaqub al-Mansur in 1196 following the battle of Alarcos.

According to Howden, the crusaders completely destroyed the city, leaving no stone upon another, because they did not believe that the Portuguese could hold it. There is no evidence of any interruption in Almohad administration, so the claim is clearly an exaggeration. The Almohad lands in al-Andalus had, however, not suffered such a temporary shock since 1189. The crusaders stayed in Portugal no more than three weeks. The raid can probably be considered an act of revenge for the crusaders of 1189, whose success had been so quickly undone.

== Aftermath ==
From Silves, the crusaders continued their journey to the port of Messina, where they arrived in the first week of August. There they joined with the emperor's forces, but the emperor fell ill before the fleet departed for the Holy Land on 1 September. The fleet landed in Acre three weeks later.

== Bibliography ==
- Barroca, Mário Jorge (2006). "Portugal". In Alan V. Murray (ed.). The Crusades: An Encyclopedia. Vol. 3: K–P. ABC-CLIO. pp. 979–984.
- Cushing, Dana (2017). "The Siege of Silves in 1189". Medieval Warfare. 7 (5): 48–53. JSTOR 48578126.
- David, Charles Wendell (1939). "Narratio de Itinere Navali Peregrinorum Hierosolymam Tendentium et Silviam Capientium, A.D. 1189". Proceedings of the American Philosophical Society. 81 (5): 591–676. JSTOR 985010.
- Lappenberg, J. M., ed. (1859). "Annales Stadenses auctore Alberto". Monumenta Germaniae Historica, Scriptores. Vol. 16. Hanover. pp. 271–379.
- Loud, Graham A. (2014). "The German Crusade of 1197–1198". Crusades. 13: 143–172. doi:10.1080/28327861.2014.12220393.
- Naumann, Claudia (1994). Der Kreuzzug Kaiser Heinrichs VI. Peter Lang.
- Richard, Jean (1999). The Crusades, c.1071–c.1291. Translated by Jean Birrell. Cambridge University Press. ISBN 978-0-521-62566-1.
- Slaughter, John E. (1968). "The Conquest of Silves: A Contemporary Narrative" (PDF). The Journal of the American Portuguese Cultural Society. 2: 25–44.
- Villegas-Aristizábal, Lucas (2015). "Norman and Anglo-Norman Intervention in the Iberian Wars of Reconquest before and after the First Crusade". In Kathryn Hurlock; Paul Oldfield (eds.). Crusading and Pilgrimage in the Norman World. Boydell. pp. 103–124. doi:10.1484/J.NMS.5.111293.
