= De itinere navali =

Latin account of the siege and capture of Silves

The only page containing an illustration from the only known copy of De itinere navali. The marginal drawing is the head of a person (probably a woman) wearing an ornamental headdress.

De itinere navali ('Of the Seaborne Journey') is an anonymous Latin account of the siege and capture of Silves in 1189, one of the expeditions of the Third Crusade. It was written by an eyewitness shortly after the events it records. It is known from a single copy made a few decades later. It has been translated into English three times.

== Manuscript and editions ==
De itinere navali survives in a single manuscript, now shelfmark MM. V. 11 at the Turin Academy of Sciences. It is a copy, not an autograph. The manuscript contains only twelve folios in a mediocre state of preservation. In a few places, the text is illegible. Large initials set partially into the margin indicate the basic divisions of the text. The manuscript dates to the early 13th century and was possibly copied in southern France. In places the original handwriting has been corrected by a superior scribe using a higher quality ink. Besides De itinere navali, the manuscript contains one other text relating to the Third Crusade, the short Epistola de morte Friderici imperatoris.

The manuscript was purchased in 1837 in Aix-en-Provence by Costanzo Gazzera, who paginated it and had it bound in calfskin. He brought it to scholarly attention and left it to the Turin Academy. He also published the first edition in 1840. João Baptista da Silva Lopes published Gazzera's edition with a Portuguese translation in 1844. Anton Chroust published a new edition for the Monumenta Germaniae Historica (MGH) in 1928, although it contains many errors. Charles Wendell David prepared a corrected edition in 1939. The first partial English translation, of only the part dealing with the conquest of Silves, was by John Slaughter in 1968. It was based on the Portuguese translation of Silva Lopes. The first full English translation, by Jonathan Wilson, appeared in 2009. A translation by Graham Loud appeared the following year. Most recently, Dana Cushing has published an edition and translation with a facsimile of the manuscript.

== Title ==
De itinere navali is untitled in the manuscript. Every editor has supplied his or her own title (in Latin).

- Gazzera entitled it De itinere navali, de eventibus, deque rebus, a peregrinis Hierosolyman petentibus, MCLXXXIX, fortiter gestis narratio, which David considered overlong.
- Silva Lopes translated Gazzera's title with the addition of a mistaken reference to the crusaders' point of departure being the mouth of the Scheldt: Relação da derrota naval, façanhas e successos dos cruzados que parti'rão do Escalda para a Terra Santa no anno de 1189.
- The MGH edition bears the title Narratio itineris navalis ad Terram Sanctam, which David considered misleading, since the account does not follow the itinerary all the way to the Holy Land.
- David entitled it Narratio de itinere navali peregrinorum Hierosolymam tendentium et Silviam capientium, A.D. 1189, although he calls it Narratio de itinere navali for short. For his English translation, Loud translated David's title as An Account of the Seaborne Journey of the Pilgrims Heading to Jerusalem Who Captured Silves in 1189.
- The Encyclopedia of the Medieval Chronicle, noting that its four previous editor gave it four different titles, supplies its own: Narratio de itinere navali ad Terram Sanctam.
- A short form of Gazzera's title, De itinere navali, appears in the title of Cushing's edition.

== Date and authorship ==
The author of De itinere navali is anonymous. He was a participant in the expedition and an eyewitness to the events he describes. His account is contemporary. In light of its victorious tone, it is probable that he composed it before the city of Silves was recaptured by the Almohads in July 1191. He refers to the siege of Lisbon (1147) as having taken place 44 years earlier, which is either an error for 42 if counting from the time of the expedition or else indicates that he was writing in 1191. (The author also refers to the siege of Tortosa of 1148 as having taken place at the same time as Lisbon.) Although it itself is not a diary, the Narratio was probably composed from notes taken as events occurred. One result of this is that at no point does the narrative reference events which have not yet occurred.

He was a German from the Kingdom of Germany in the Holy Roman Empire. He refers to "we of the German kingdom" (nos de regno Teutonico) and the "ships of our empire" (naves de nostro imperio). He uses the German mile (miliare Teutonicum). He was probably from northern Germany, where his expedition originated. He compares the Tagus to the Elbe and the city of Silves to Goslar. Chroust and David considered him in all likelihood a priest, although De itinere navali is not an especially pious or learned work. His education appears to have been "rudimentary". Cushing argues that he was in fact a layman of the artisan or merchant class. His description of the sea voyage indicates that he was not an experienced sailor.

== Content ==
=== Synopsis ===
De itinere navali begins with a statement of purpose and inspiration:

Antiquorum provide consuetud[in]i morem gerens qui gesta sua scripture laqueis innodare satagerunt ut posteritatis noticiam non evaderent, itineris navalis multiformes eventus qui peregrinis Jerosolimam tendentibus acciderunt simpliciter explicare decrevi.

Translation:

Following the example of the wise custom of the Ancients, who were at pains to record their deeds through the adornment of writing, so that they did not escape the notice of posterity, I have decided to give a simple account of the many different events that took place on the seaborne journey of the pilgrims who were heading to Jerusalem.

This is followed by a brief statement on background, referencing the fall of Jerusalem to Saladin in 1187 and the preaching of the Third Crusade, which "moved a huge number of people ... to avenge this offence." The narrator's expedition started from Bremen and went out to sea from Blexen on 22 April 1189.

De itinere navali is mostly a day-to-day account of the expedition until its arrival in Marseille in October 1189. The fleet of eleven ships sailed first to England, where they arrived on 24 April at Lowestoft. They put out to cross the Channel on 24 May from Yarmouth. They then followed the coast of France, stopping at La Rochelle, before putting in at Gozón in the kingdom of León on 18 June. During the sea voyage, "many of [the] company saw two candles burning for a long time", which may have been Saint Elmo's fire. They also saw pods of dolpins or porpoises: "a huge multitude of fish, six or seven feet long and resembling sturgeon, very often passed our ships at high speed, with all their bodies out of the water." From Gozón, they made a brief pilgrimage overland to Oviedo Cathedral before sailing to Lisbon, where they arrived in July. At this juncture, the author repeats the legend of the mares of Sintra, which "conceive from the wind ... horses that are ... extraordinarily speedy, but live for no more than eight years." This legend is also found in De expugnatione Lyxbonensi.

At Lisbon, having learned that a previous group of crusaders had sacked Alvor, the crusaders were asked by King Sancho I of Portugal to assist him in capturing Silves. The expedition was augmented by 37 ships from Galicia plus a Portuguese squadron. At Silves, they were joined by a ship from Brittany. At this point in the narrative, the author gives a detailed description of Silves. The siege began on 21 July and is recounted in detail, including the use of siege engines by both sides and extensive tunneling. On 3 September, the city was handed over by agreement. The author notes when the crusaders acted "in defiance of the treaty" and how this created bad blood between them and King Sancho.

After a description of the division of—and disputes over—the booty, the author notes that nine other castles came into Portuguese hands as a consequence of the fall of Silves. The expedition entered the Atlantic again on 20 September. The remainder of the narrative describes the voyage as far as Marseille, noting the places passed along the way.

=== Historical value ===
De itinere navali is the most valuable historical source for the expedition and the siege of Silves. The author was a keen observer with a special interest in geography and generally accurate with numbers. He scrupulously records the days as they pass, allowing for the precise dating of events. The numbers he gives of ships and people are reasonable. So far as can be checked, he is generally accurate on both counts.

De itinere navali is also a valuable geographical source, given its author penchant for naming places and giving geographical asides. He even includes references to political and ethnic geography, as when he notes that three of the nine bishoprics of Brittany are Breton-speaking and the rest French-speaking. He notes the "five kingdoms of the Spanish", which are Aragon, Navarre, Castile ("of those people who are specifically called the 'Spanish'"), León (which he calls Galicia) and Portugal. He occasionally goes beyond what he himself saw to describe places further afield, such as Marrakesh and Mecca. In these cases he is somewhat less accurate.

De itinere navali displays some anti-Flemish and anti-Portuguese bias. The most praised individual, however, was a Galician knight who single-handedly removed a stone from the wall while under fire and returned to camp. Respect is shown to the fighting abilities of the crusaders' Muslim adversaries. The author had no tolerance for violations of contracts and promises.

De itinere navali does not provide particulars on the organization of its expedition. It appears, however, that it was composed of "urbanite burghers". There is no indication that any of the crusaders were other than commoners. The only person of knightly rank mentioned is the Galician and no higher noble is mention. The leaders of the expedition are called "magistrates" (magistri) or collectively the magistratus. The members of the expedition are called "associates" (socii) and a contubernium. Decisions are said to be made in common or in council.

Of historical interest is the mention of duces vie ('leaders of the way') that conducted the fleet into La Rochelle. These seem to be pilots. Likewise, the Galician knight is described as dux ... navis nostre ('leader of our ship'). De itinere navali is also one of the few texts to imply that the Order of the Holy Sepulchre was a military order, although it is probably a mistake based on the close association of the order in Spain with the Templars and Hospitallers.

== Bibliography ==
- Bréhier, Louis (1946). "Review of David 1939". Revue d'Histoire Ecclésiastique. 41: 105.
- Casson, Lionel (1940). "Review of David 1939". The Classical Weekly. 34: 64–65. doi:10.2307/4341032. JSTOR 4341032.
- Castro Henriques, António (2010). "Narratio de Itinere Navali ad Terram Sanctam [Tendentium et Silvam Capientum]". In Graeme Dunphy (ed.). Encyclopedia of the Medieval Chronicle. Vol. 2. Brill. p. 1136.
- Classen, Albrecht (2014). "Review of Cushing 2013". Mediaevistik. 27: 356–358. JSTOR 24616216.
- Cushing, Dana, ed. (2013). A German Third Crusader's Chronicle of his Voyage and the Siege of Almohad Silves, 1189 AD / Muwahid Xelb, 585 AH: De Itinere Navali. Antimony Media.
- David, Charles Wendell (1939). "Narratio de Itinere Navali Peregrinorum Hierosolymam Tendentium et Silviam Capientium, A.D. 1189". Proceedings of the American Philosophical Society. 81 (5): 591–676. JSTOR 985010.
- Fischer, Paul (1940). "Review of David 1939". Church History. 9 (4): 384–385. doi:10.2307/3160918. JSTOR 3160918.
- Foulet, Alfred [in German] (1940). "Review of David 1939". Speculum. 15 (2): 235. doi:10.2307/2849054. JSTOR 2849054.
- Loud, Graham A., ed. (2010). The Crusade of Frederick Barbarossa: The History of the Expedition of the Emperor Frederick and Related Texts. Ashgate.
- Nicholson, Helen J. (2015). "Review of Cushing 2013". Speculum. 90 (1): 235–236. doi:10.1017/S0038713414002899.
- Price, Brian R. (2014). "Review of Cushing 2013" (PDF). The Journal of Military History. 78 (4): 1141–1142.
- Slaughter, John E. (1968). "The Conquest of Silves: A Contemporary Narrative" (PDF). The Journal of the American Portuguese Cultural Society. 2: 25–44.
- Vernet, André [in French] (1940). "Review of David 1939". Bibliothèque de l'École des chartes (101): 183–184.
- Wheeler, Roderick; Rigney, James (1941). "Review of David 1939". Franciscan Studies. New Series. 1 (3): 93–95. JSTOR 23801573.
- Wilson, Jonathan (2009). The Siege and Conquest of Silves, 1189: A Tale of the Third Crusade by Anonymous Crusader. Mesquita Press.
- Wilson, Jonathan (2020). "'Neither age nor sex sparing': The Alvor Massacre 1189, an Anomaly in the Portuguese Reconquista?". Journal of Medieval Iberian Studies. 12 (2): 199–229. doi:10.1080/17546559.2019.1704043.
