= Alvor (Portimão) =

- Civil parish
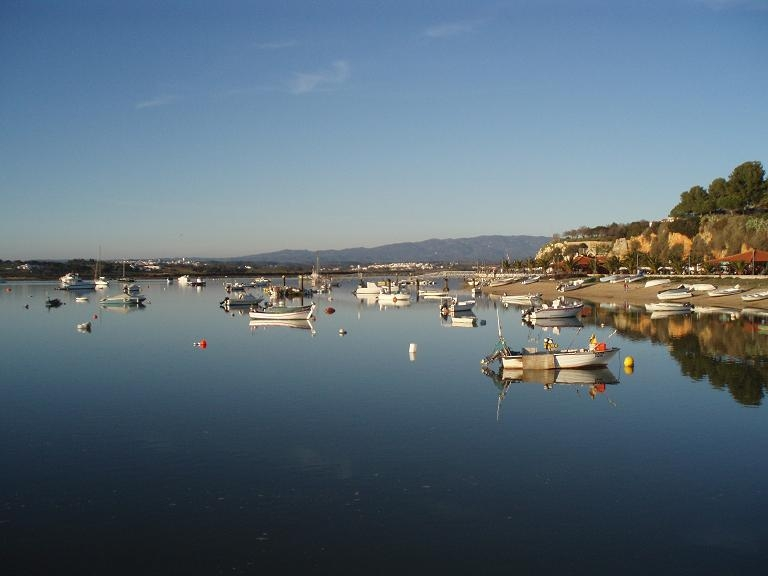
- Along the Alvor River

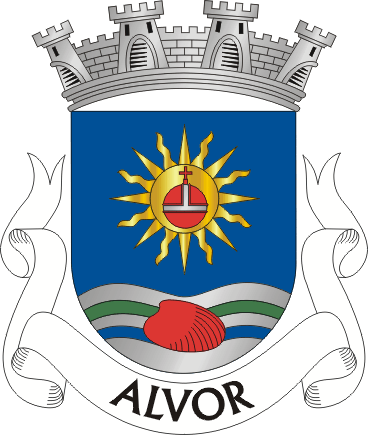
- Coat of arms
- Interactive map of Alvor
- Location within Portugal Location within Europe
- Coordinates: 37.130°N 8.594°W
- Country: Portugal
- Region: Algarve
- Intermunic. comm.: Algarve
- District: Faro
- Municipality: Portimão

Area
  - Total: 15.25 km^{2} (5.89 sq mi)
- Elevation: 24 m (79 ft)

Population (2011)
  - Total: 6,154
  - Density: 403.5/km^{2} (1,045/sq mi)
- Time zone: UTC+00:00 (WET)
  - Summer (DST): UTC+01:00 (WEST)
- Postal code: 8500
- Patron: São Salvador
- Website: http://www.jf-alvor.pt

Alvor is a civil parish (Portuguese: freguesia) in the municipality of Portimão, in the southern Algarve of Portugal. The population in 2011 was 6,154, in an area of 15.25 km².

== History ==
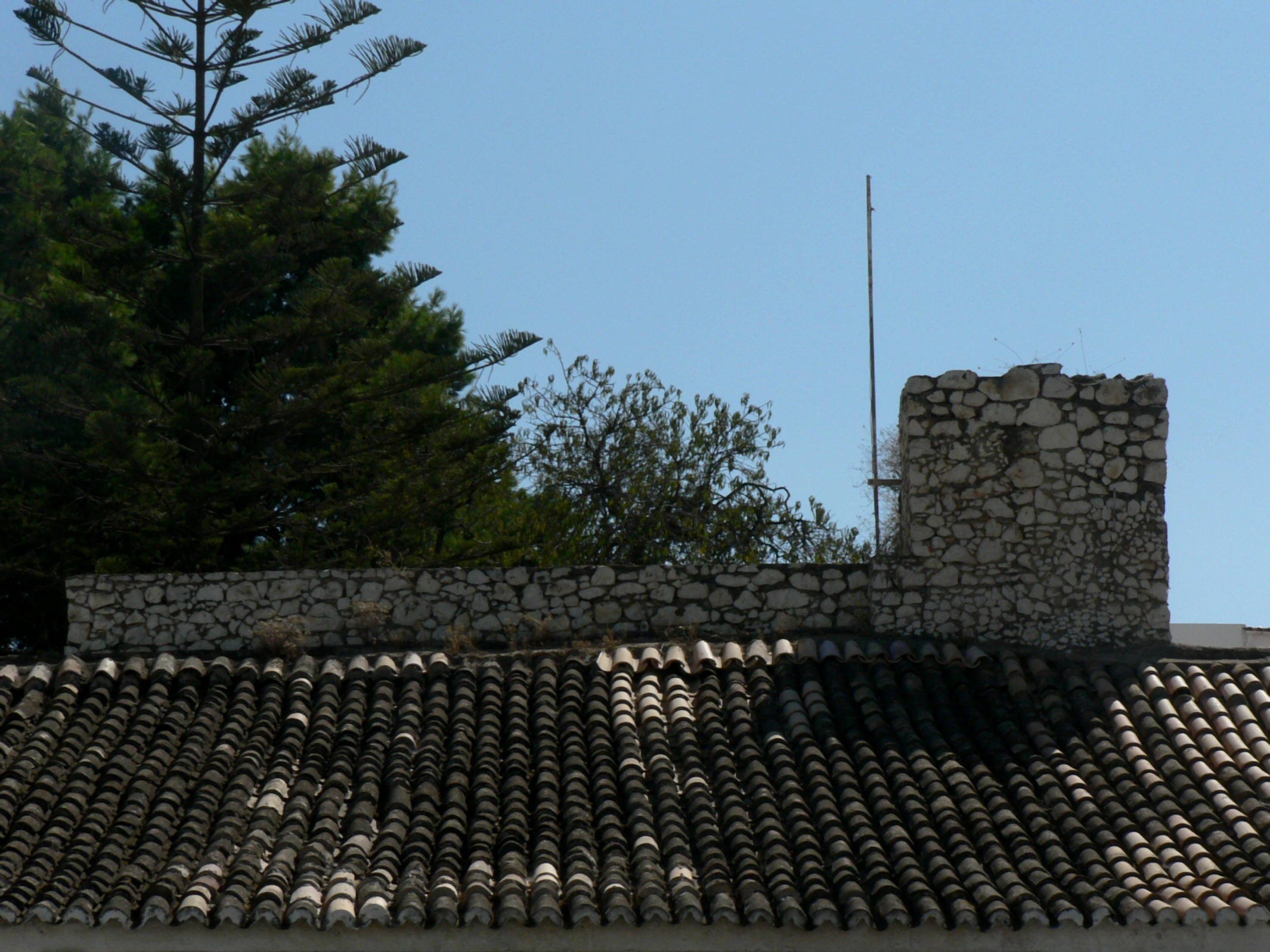
A glimpse of the Castle of Alvor

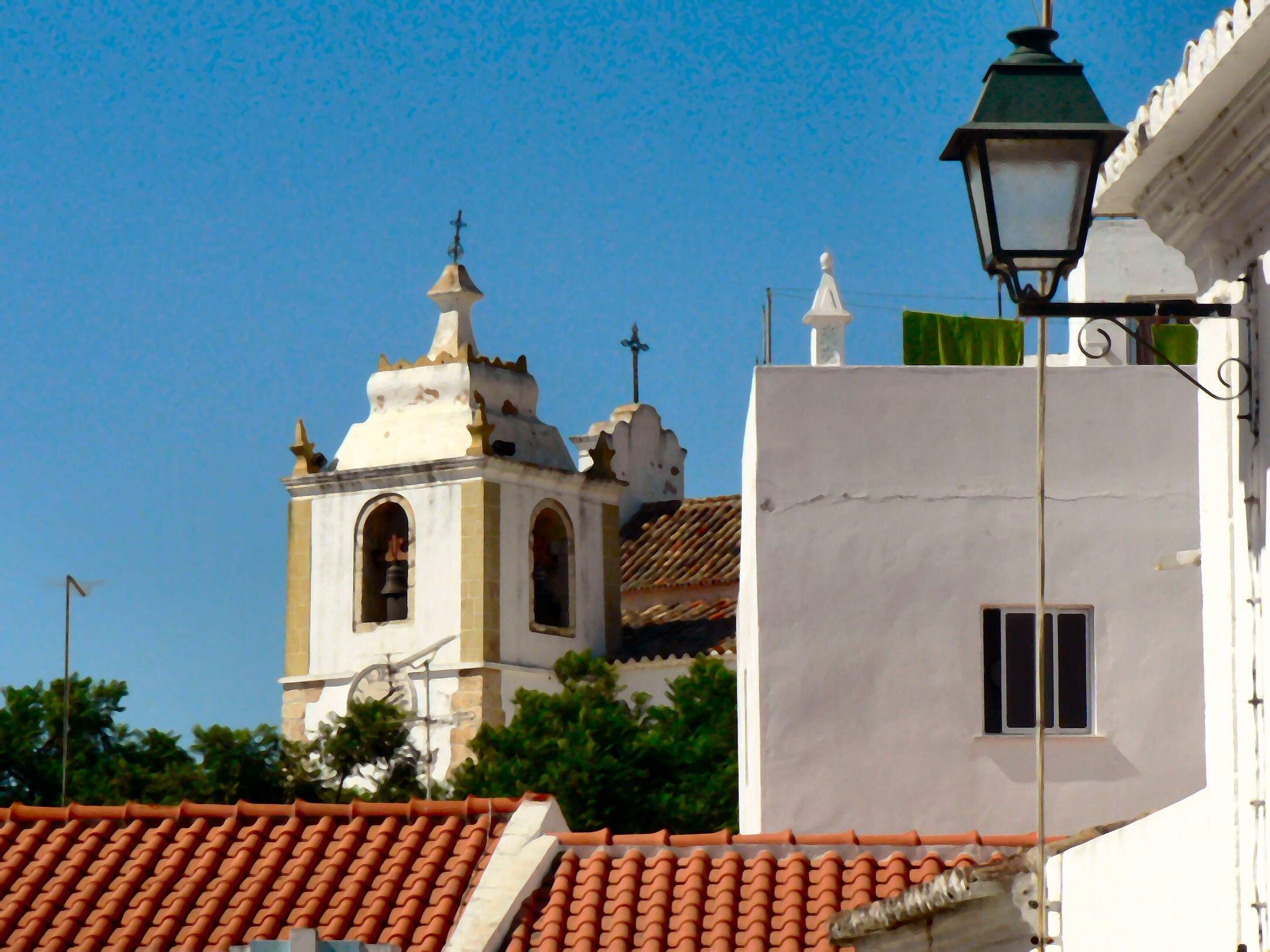
The Facho Tower and Matriz Church, medieval symbols of Alvor's history

Alvor was founded in 436 B.C. by the Carthaginian General Aníbal Barca as a commercial port, which he named Portus Hannibalis. The settlement grew around the sea, near the place called Vila Velha, where a Celtic castro dominated the river mouth during the Iron Age. It is likely that it was the Roman colony of Ipses, which was authorized to mint currency, and was absorbed during the Roman era.

Taken by the Moors in 716, the settlement began to be referred to as Albur, and gained an impressive castle, with only vestiges remaining.

=== Middle Ages ===
This bastion was conquered on 3 June 1189, by the forces of King Sancho I of Portugal, with help from Crusader forces. It was retaken two years later, and definitively reconquered in 1250. Rebuilt by King Denis in 1300, it served for 500 years the coastal defences against attacks by pirates and privateers until it was destroyed in 1755 by the tsunami and earthquake that devastated Lisbon.

By royal decree of Afonso V, dated 22 May 1469, it was raised to the status of Countship, under the seigneurial title bestowed to Afonso, Count of Faro. But, this title did not extend beyond this period, as the Count of Faro was implicated in a conspiracy against John II of Portugal (in 1483-84), and it reverted to the Crown.

During the reign of John II, Alvor continued to receive patronage, the king dying on 25 October 1495 in the palace of Álvaro de Ataíde after catching a chill in Monchique (the residence, which was situated on Rua do Poço, was located near the supposed hydrothermal springs of Caldas de Monchique).

The Prince Regent ordered, in the name of Manuel of Portugal, the elevation of Alvor to vila (town) on 28 February 1495, which was confirmed in a secondary diploma on 28 December 1498.

In the closing decades of the 15th century Alvor was a centre of the Jewish community in Portugal.

=== Monarchy ===
King Sebastian visited the municipality on 27 January 1573, staying on the 24-25 in Alvor, where he visited the houses (now in ruins) where in 1495 King John II died. At that time the alcaide already pertained to the Count of Odemira. The first foral was issued during the reign of Philip II of Spain during the Iberian Union on 13 December 1585. Friar João de São José declared, in 1577, that Alvor was a transit port for fully loaded ships (carracks and battleships), while Fernandes Serrão (around 1606) referred to settlement of 240 homes, a heavily defended by its fort, that helped to serve a local fishing fleet and local exports. There is also mention of the localities of Montes de Baixo and Montes de Cima, colloquially known as the Freires since there were a preponderance of residents from that family living in the region.

The Matriz Church was constructed in the early part of the 16th century by Ataide family, alcades of the vila, donatorios with many privileges and lands (it was likely Álvaro de Ataide's son who initiated the construction of the church in 1497). In 1652 the Santa Casa da Misericórdia was first erected in the community. By royal charter, issued by Peter II, the vila of Alvor was once again raised to Countship (4 February 1683) under Francisco de Távora, a nobleman who occupied several official duties and distinguished himself during the Battle of Montes Claros. The title was later passed on to Bernardo de Távora, and then Luís Bernardo de Távora, eventually extinguished after the Távora affair. The parish and the Távora assets were incorporated in the House of the Queens (Portuguese: Casa das Rainhas) until 1773, when these were integrated into the parish when it was annexed into the municipality of Portimão.

Although the 1755 earthquake (1 November) resulted in the death of only one person, it was responsible for the destruction of homes, the fort, the Facho tower, and the chapel of Nossa Senhora da Ajuda, in addition to altering the river's course. Its effects also resulted in the decrease of the local population by 1000 residents; by 1900 the population included less than 3014 souls, owing to the effects of the earthquake.

=== Republic ===
After the Carnation Revolution of 1974 in Lisbon, the Alvor Agreement was signed on 15 January 1975 in Alvor and granted Angola independence from Portugal on 11 November formally ending the 13-year-long Angolan War of Independence. On 14 April 1988 the village once again attained the title of vila (town), under decree 42/88, owing to its economic, cultural and social development.

== Geography ==
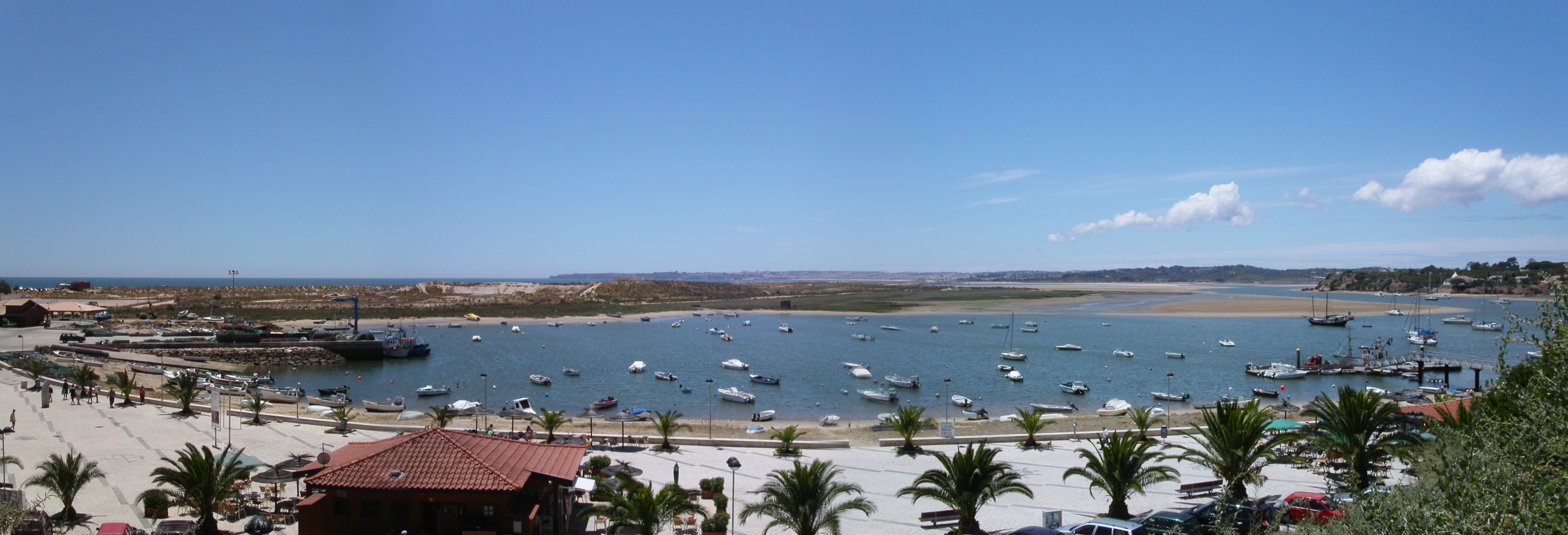
A panoramic landscape of the Alvor River in the parish of Alvor

The parish of Alvor is located along the southern coast of Portimão surrounded by its municipal neighbours Mexilhoeira Grande and Portimão, and the municipality of Lagos (parish of Odiáxere).

The Ria de Alvor (Alvor Estuary) is located between the towns of Lagos and Portimão. Covering 1700 hectares it includes a diverse mix of habitats of brushwood, forest and agricultural land, comprising the estuary, dunes, marshes and salt-pans, and also the Quinta da Rocha and Abicada peninsula. Ria de Alvor was included in the Natura 2000 network of sites, due to the presence of species and habitats considered worthy of protection at the European level.

The Natura 2000 network recognizes the need for protection of the following:

- Priority habitats: Coastal lagoons, fixed coastal dunes with herbaceous vegetation (grey dunes)
- Priority species: Camphor Thyme Thymus camphoratus
- Other features of EU Importance: 13 habitats, including the estuary, spartina swards, salt meadows and embryo dunes. Stripe-necked Terrapin Mauremys leprosa, Otter Lutra lutra and Algarvian Toadflax Linaria algarviana

== Architecture ==
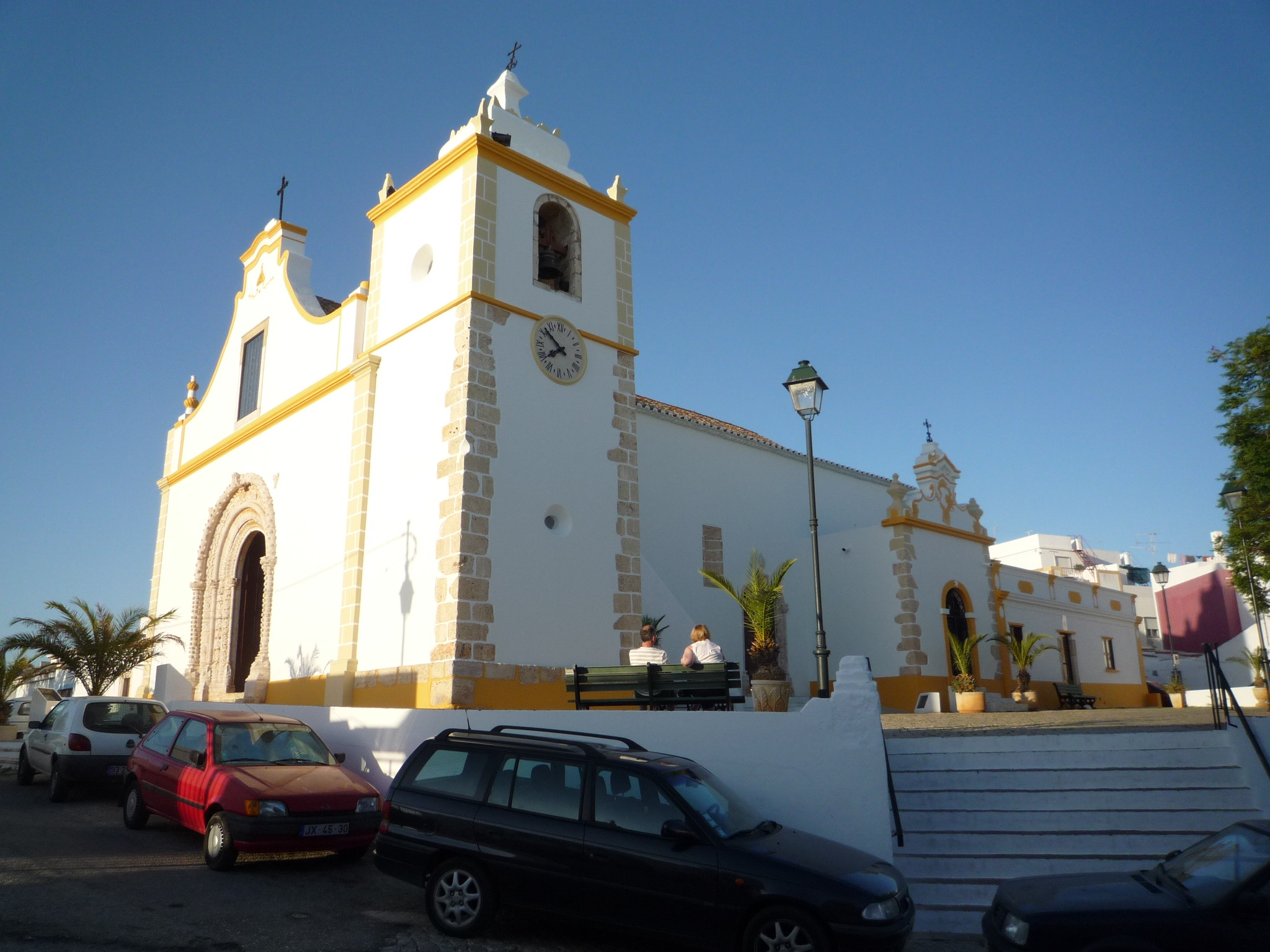
The Church of the Divine Saviour, a Manueline- and Rococo-era parochial church constructed in the 16th century

=== Civic ===
- Bairro of Saal do Alvor (Portuguese: Bairro Popular/Bairro Saal do Alvor), an urban agglomeration developed post-Carnation Revolution, by the Serviço Ambulatório Local (SAAL), to provide affordable housing;
- Historical residences of Prainha (Portuguese: Conjunto Habitacional da Prainha/Aldeamento da Prainha), a contemporary urban agglomeration of housing for residencial use;
- Hotel Alvor Praia Portuguese: Hotel Alvor Praia/Hotel Pestana Alvor Praia), a Modernist hotel complex, that includes an attention to the use of landscaping and endemic plants;
- Pool Complex of Prainha (Portuguese: Conjunto Piscina e Falésias Circundantes/Piscina da Prainha), sport and recreational Modernist architecture; the pool and gardens are landscaped in the Modernist style, as well as the attempt at providing comfort and leisure to the users.

=== Military ===
- Castle of Alvor (Portuguese: Ruínas do Antigo Castelo/Forte de Alvor), constructed in the 7th century, it was based on a Phoenician, later Greek and Carthaginian fort, constructed on a Lusitanian castro, and conquered by Hannibal, who rechristened it Portus Annibalis, which would be the basis of the Roman settlement Barcínia. It was later conquered by the Arabs who named it Albus beginning a process of development that lasted until the Christian fort was destroyed by the 1755 earthquake: the walls of this fortification are the only remnants of this castle that still exist.

=== Religious ===
- Chapel of Nossa Senhora da Rocha (Portuguese: Capela de Nossa Senhora da Rocha)
- Church of the Divino Salvador de Alvor (Portuguese: Igreja Paroquial de Alvor/Igreja do Divino Salvador)- constructed in the Manueline and Rococo styles, the longitudinal church is composed of three naves, with expressive principal porticos and lateral arcades. The 18th century principal façade highlight the entranceway with an interior in the Baroque style, main and collateral altars in a revivalist style with Rococo chapels.
- Church of the Misericórdia (Portuguese: Igreja da Misericórdia), a 15th-century church, consisting of a singular stucco nave and simple curved facade;

In addition to the temples listed here, the civil parish of Alvor is home to three hermitage-like mosques, or morábito, that include the Morábito de São João, Morábito de São Pedro, and the Morábito anexo à sacristia da Igreja Matriz. All were constructed in the Manueline-era, and show decorative influences from the period, including specifically the doorjamb elements.
