= Alvor massacre =

1189 event in Iberia during the Third Crusade

The Alvor massacre took place in June 1189 during the Third Crusade, when a fleet of crusaders from the Holy Roman Empire, Denmark and the County of Flanders stormed the castle of Alvor in the Algarve, then part of the Almohad Caliphate, and massacred 5,600 people. The place of the conquest and massacre of Alvor in the Portuguese Reconquista is unclear, but there are grounds for thinking that it was part of the strategy of King Sancho I, who launched a siege of Silves a month later.

== Sources ==
The event is briefly mentioned in several sources, the most important being the anonymous Account of the Seaborne Journey by a crusader from northern Germany on a later expedition, whose mention takes up seven lines in the manuscript. The only other contemporary source to directly mention the Alvor massacre is the Royal Chronicle of Cologne. Another contemporary source, the Annals of Lambertus Parvus, is probably referring to the Alvor expedition when it recounts how a fleet of northerner crusaders gathered in England and "many battles … joined with the pagans" in the Iberian Peninsula on their way to the East. The only Arabic source that refers to the loss of Alvor is the Bayān al-mughrib of Ibn ʿIdhārī, based on contemporary sources. It refers to Alvor as "the port", a reference to its classical name, Portus Hannibalis. It records that the crusaders "dealt death to all that were in it, great and small, men and women."

There is confusion in some later sources, such as the Itinerary of the Pilgrims and Deeds of King Richard and the Chronicle of Robert of Auxerre, between the sack of Alvor and the capture of Silves. Robert's account found its way into the chronicle of William of Nangis and the Chronicle of Tours. The memory of the Alvor massacre was erroneously transferred to the conquest of Silves in Robert's account, where "no age was spared, and both sexes equally were slaughtered." He has 50 ships from Frisia and Denmark joining with the 37 crusader ships that actually attacked Silves. Ibn ʿIdhārī mentions the massacre after the fall of Silves in his narrative.

== Expedition ==
In February 1189, fifty or more ships carrying perhaps 12,000 men sailed from Frisia. At the mouth of the Rhine, they joined with another fleet consisting of crusaders from the Rhineland, Holland and Flanders. From there, they sailed to Dartmouth, joining further squadrons of English and Flemish ships. According to Lambertus, the fleet had 55 ships and contained Danes, Flemings, Frisians and men from Cologne and Liège.

The Royal Chronicle records that the fleet set sail during Lent. Ten days after setting out, it stopped in Galicia. At that time it contained 60 ships of various origins with "10,000 fighting men and more." The crusaders attempted to visit the shrine of Saint James at Compostela. A rumour spread that they intended to steal James's relics and there was fighting between the pilgrims and the townspeople resulting in fatalities on both sides before, "through wise men intervening," the crusaders agreed to return to their ships. The fleet then stopped in Lisbon before attacking Alvor, as recorded in the Seaborne Journey:

The ships from our empire and from Flanders had arrived some four or five weeks before us [around 29 May – 6 June], and on their voyage beyond Lisbon they had stormed a fortified town named Alvor, subject to the lordship of Silves, and we were reliably informed that, sparing neither age nor sex, they slew some 5,600 people. Galleys from Lisbon accompanied them until they reached the Straits [of Gibraltar] and then they returned. They informed us that they were making a good voyage, and they brought back some captive Saracens… On the afternoon of the third day [July 17] we saw the town of Alvor, which our men had captured and destroyed, overlooking the sea, as well as other abandoned places whose inhabitants had been killed at Alvor.

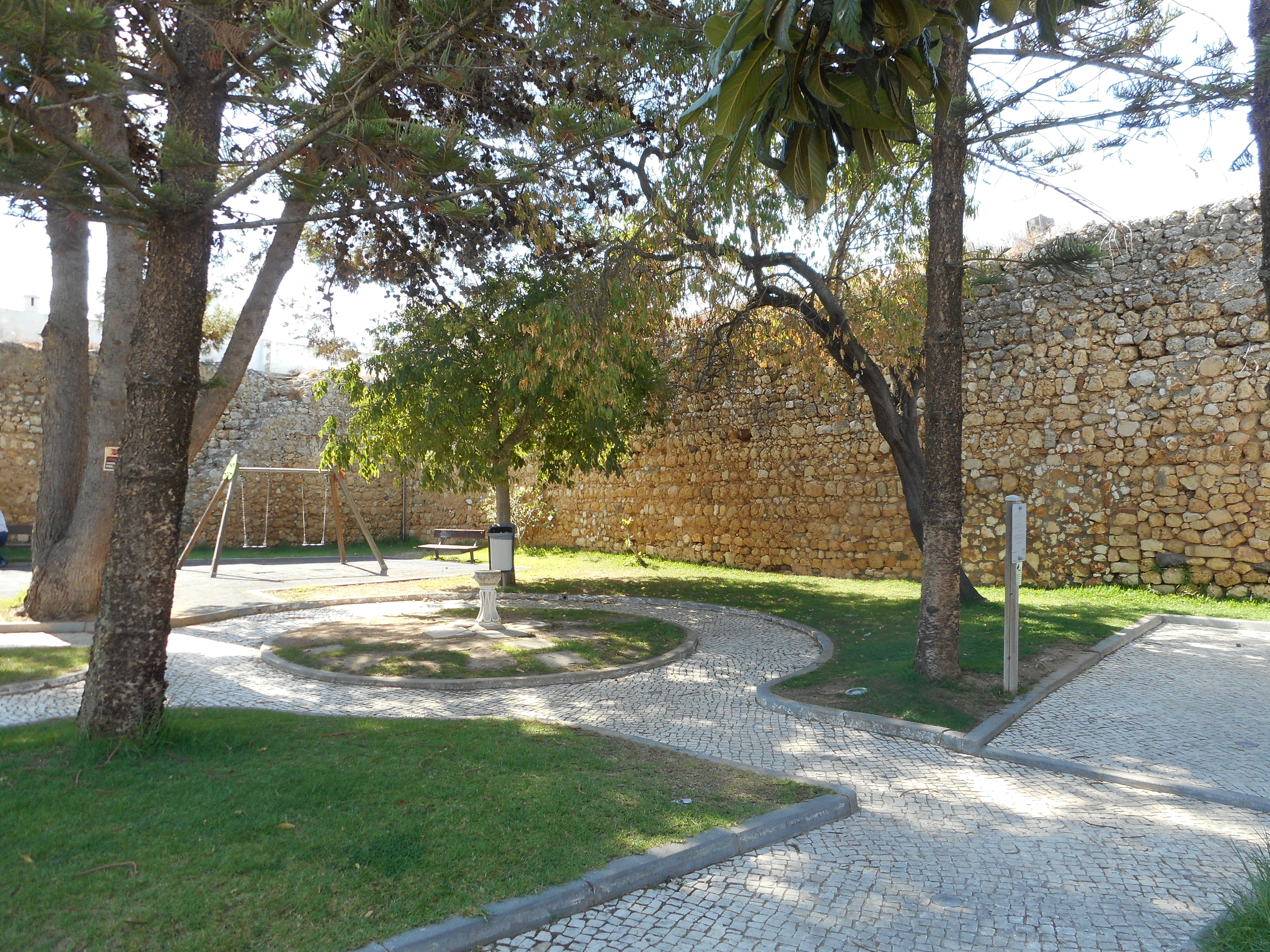
View inside the walls of the citadel of Alvor today

To this account of the massacre, the Royal Chronicle adds the detail that they "captured endless amounts of silver and gold." After the sack, the men of Cologne chose to remain in Portugal while the rest of the expedition continued eastward. Lambertus confirms that the fleet eventually joined the siege of Acre. It is the fleet that arrives on 1 September in the account of Arnold of Lübeck and is also mentioned by Ralph of Coggeshall. The Itinerary of the Pilgrims records its arrival, but conflates it with the fleet that captured Silves and mistakenly transplants the massacre to that city.

The leaders of the fleet that sacked Alvor are unnamed in any source. The crusaders seem mainly to have been commoners. The event cannot be dated more precisely than to the month of June. Neither is it clear how long it took to reduce Alvor. It was probably stormed, since the chronology leaves no room for a lengthy siege. Following the capture of Silves, Sancho I granted Alvor to the monastery of Santa Cruz.

== Place in the Reconquista ==
No source states explicitly that the crusaders who attacked Alvor were acting in agreement with Portugal, but it is likely that they were. The fleet was in Lisbon prior to the sack and was accompanied as far as the Straits of Gibraltar by some Portuguese galleys. Moreover, the sack of Alvor was of strategic value for King Sancho I's impending attack on Silves.

The massacre at Alvor was exceptional in the Portuguese Reconquista. The normal policy was to encourage Muslim populations to remain to keep the land under cultivation and to pay taxes to the king. The indiscriminate massacre shocked contemporaries. The sack of Alvor is unrecorded in medieval Portuguese historiography, possibly it was even suppressed. In the account of Sancho I's reign in the Chronicle of 1419, the capture of Silves is recounted in detail, but Alvor is not mentioned.

Alvor was retaken by the Almohads during their campaign of 1191.

== Bibliography ==
- Barroca, Mário Jorge (2006). "Portugal". In Alan V. Murray (ed.). The Crusades: An Encyclopedia. Vol. 3: K–P. ABC-CLIO. pp. 979–984.
- David, Charles Wendell (1939). "Narratio de Itinere Navali Peregrinorum Hierosolymam Tendentium et Silviam Capientium, A.D. 1189". Proceedings of the American Philosophical Society. 81 (5): 591–676. JSTOR 985010.
- Lay, Stephen (2009). The Reconquest Kings of Portugal: Political and Cultural Reorientation on the Medieval Frontier. Palgrave Macmillan.
- Loud, Graham A., ed. (2010). The Crusade of Frederick Barbarossa: The History of the Expedition of the Emperor Frederick and Related Texts. Ashgate.
- Mol, Johannes A. (2002). "Frisian Fighters and the Crusades" (PDF). Crusades. 1: 89–110. doi:10.1080/28327861.2002.12220535. S2CID 161825224.
- Mol, Johannes A. (2006). "Frisia". In Alan V. Murray (ed.). The Crusades: An Encyclopedia. Vol. 2: D–J. ABC-CLIO. pp. 487–489.
- Nicholson, Helen J., ed. (2019) [1997]. Chronicle of the Third Crusade: A Itinerarium Peregrinorum et Gesta Regis Ricardi. Routledge.
- Slaughter, John E. (1968). "The Conquest of Silves: A Contemporary Narrative" (PDF). The Journal of the American Portuguese Cultural Society. 2: 25–44.
- Wilson, Jonathan (2020). "'Neither age nor sex sparing': The Alvor Massacre 1189, an Anomaly in the Portuguese Reconquista?". Journal of Medieval Iberian Studies. 12 (2): 1–31 [199–229]. doi:10.1080/17546559.2019.1704043. S2CID 214374323.
