= Almohad campaign against Portugal (1190–1191) =

The Almohad Caliphate launched a major offensive against the Kingdom of Portugal in the spring of 1190 that lasted into the summer of 1191. The Caliph Yaʿqūb al-Manṣūr crossed over from Africa to take personal command of his forces. The campaign of 1190 was underwhelming because of poor logistics, stubborn Portuguese resistance and assistance Portugal received from passing armies of the Third Crusade. The sieges of Tomar, Santarém and Silves had to be abandoned, but the caliph overwintered in Seville. The campaign of 1191 reversed Portugal's recent reconquests, captured Silves after a second siege and pushed the frontier north to the Tagus.

== 1190 expedition ==
The Almohads had previously launched an invasion of Portugal in 1184, however it floundered in that years siege of Santarém, and the Muslims were forced to withdraw in disarray. Revolts against the Almohads then sparked in the Balearic Islands and the Maghreb, and the Almohad Caliph Abu Yusuf Yaqub al-Mansur remained focused on suppressing them until 1188.

Yaʿqūb al-Manṣūr spent most of 1188–1189 preparing an expedition against Portugal. In September 1189, Silves was captured by King Sancho I of Portugal with help from some crusaders on their way to join the siege of Acre. Neither the Almohad governor of Seville Abu Hafs Yaqub Ibn Abi Hafs nor any other commander attempted to relieve the city while it was under siege by the Christians, which is indicative of either Almohad military weakness on the peninsula or the fact that King Alfonso VIII of Castile lead a major incursion into al-Andalus that same year, and reached as far as Seville, meeting only divided and poorly-organized resistance along the way.

In January 1190, al-Mansur left Marrakech for the Iberian Peninsula though he proceeded in leisurely fashion. He paused at Rabat for 40 days to gather his forces. In April 1190, al-Manṣūr finally launched his invasion. He crossed to Tarifa on April 23. The Bayān al-mughrib of Ibn ʿIdhārī reports that around this time he defeated a fleet of northern crusaders near the Strait of Gibraltar, capturing many and receiving praise from poets.

=== Caliphal offensive ===
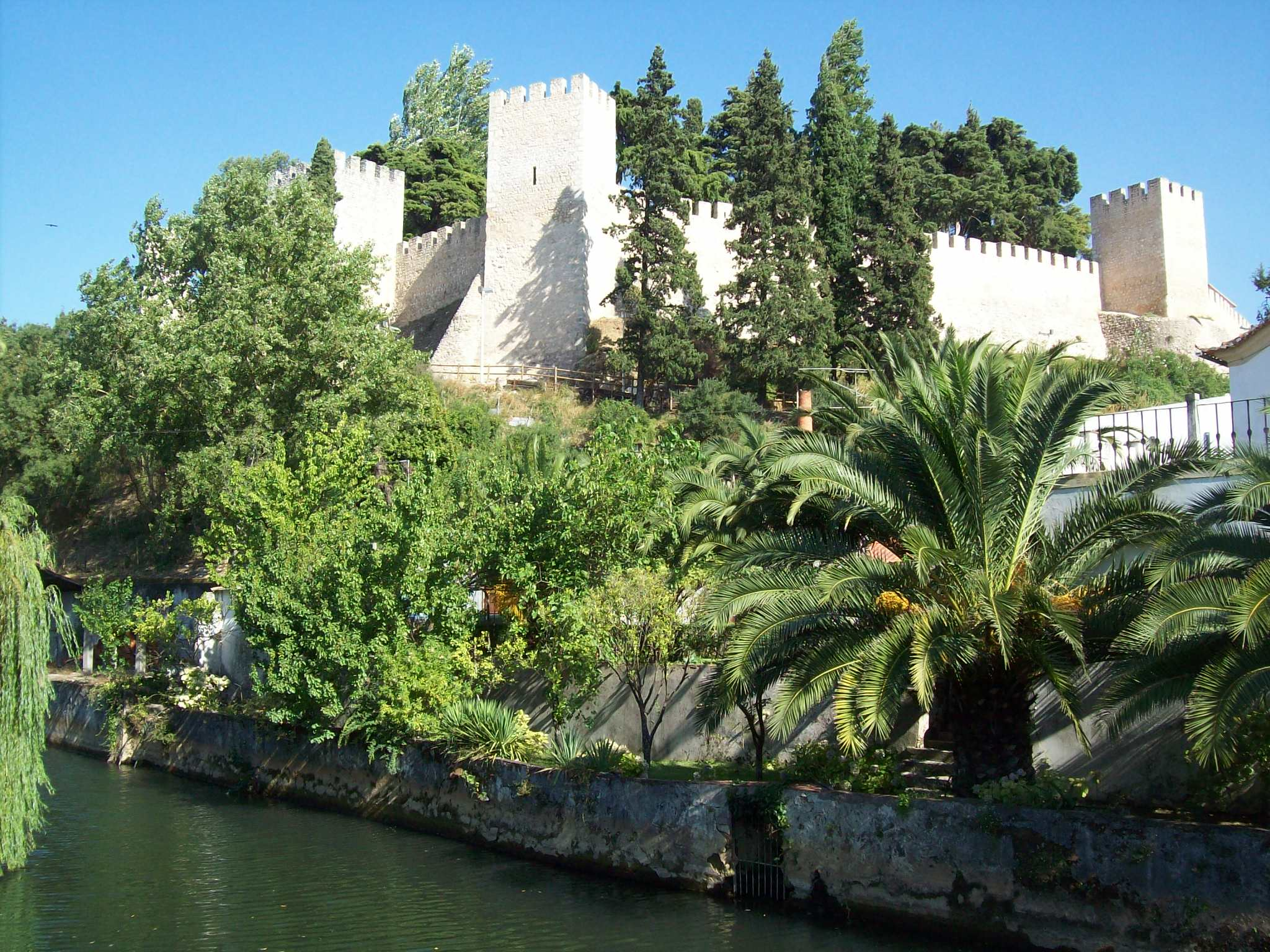
Walls of Torres Novas

After crossing from Africa, the caliph was joined by forces from Seville and Granada. In June, he crossed with his forces into Portuguese territory and laid siege to Silves. By June 6 he was camped with his forces around the city. This was the seventh major attack the Almohads launched against Portugal. On 5 July, a fleet of the Almohad navy arrived from Seville with siege equipment. The caliph, however, left operations in the hands of local troops and took most of his expeditionary force to Córdoba. His cousin, al-Sayyid Yaḥyā ibn ʿUmar, was left in command at Silves. The besiegers proved incapable of overcoming the resistance put up by the Portuguese and English defenders.

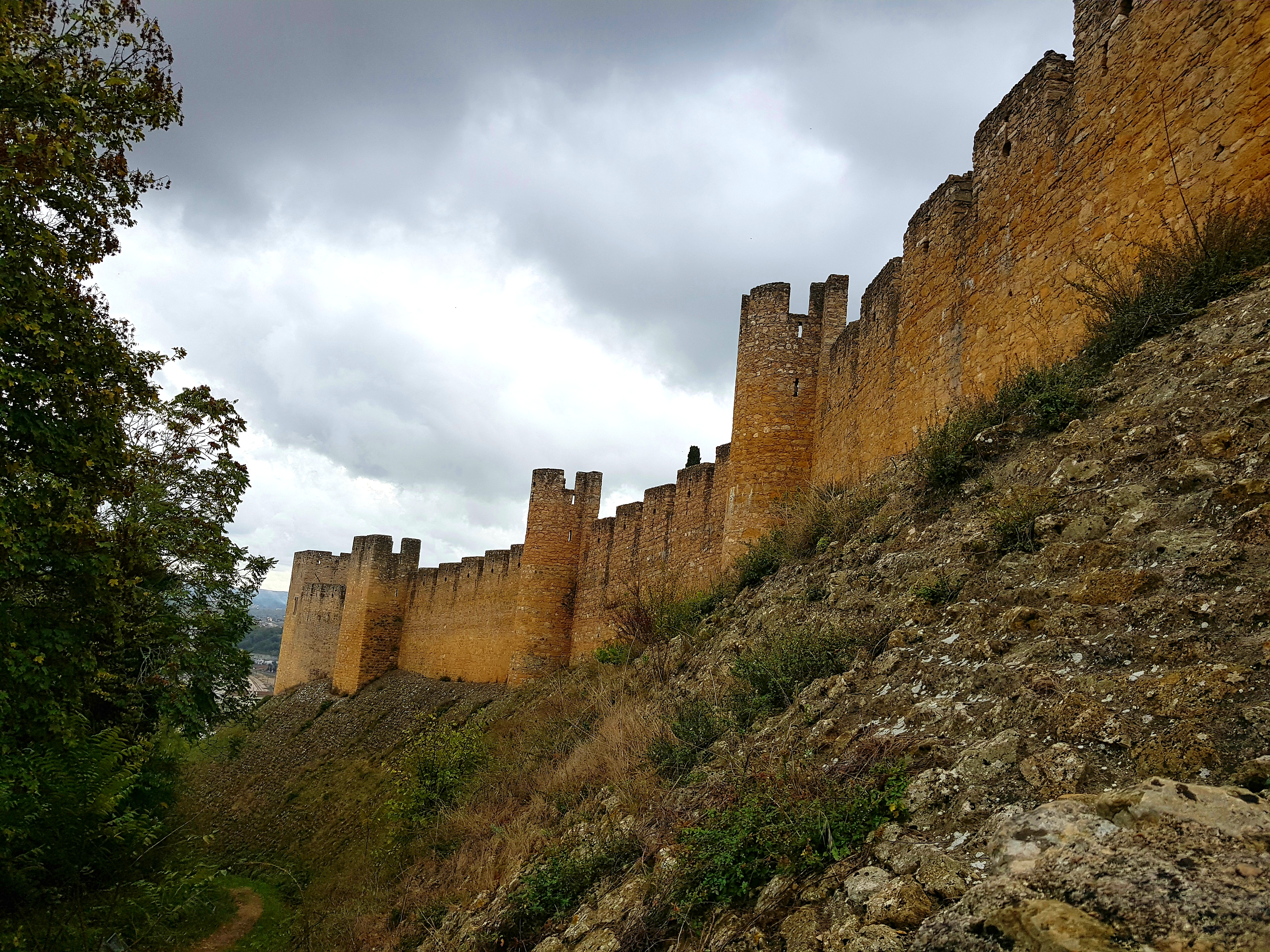
Walls of Tomar

At Córdoba, the caliph met an embassy from King Alfonso VIII of Castile, with whom he signed a truce, freeing himself to concentrate on Portugal. From Córdoba, al-Manṣūr launched an invasion of the Alentejo. Crops and vineyards were destroyed by the advancing Almohad forces, they crossed the Tagus river and they reached Torres Novas, north of Santarém. Its governor requested terms and the town surrendered. Its defenders were given their liberty, but the town was razed. The caliph then turned north with his forces and marched on Tomar, which was owned by the Knights Templar. His main objective, however, was Santarém.

=== Arrival of crusaders ===
At this juncture, two groups of crusaders made landfall in Portugal. At Silves, a single ship carrying about 100 English crusaders separated from its fleet by a storm arrived in the city amid great confusion. Bishop Nicholas begged them to take part in the city's defence, while the citizens scuttled their ship. After they were promised a replacement ship, they agreed to join the defence. The names of the leaders of this contingent are not known. The other nine ships of the fleet landed at Lisbon while King Sancho was preparing to march in defence of Santarém. According to Roger of Hoveden, 500 crusaders agreed to join the king. With their arrival, Sancho rebuffed al-Manṣūr's offer of a seven-year truce, which would have required surrendering Silves. The king took up a position in Santarém, which came under siege.

At Tomar meanwhile, the Almohads began suffering from serious food shortages as they ran out of supplies and could not find enough to sustain their forces from ravaging the land. Facing stronger resistance than anticipated, the caliph abandoned Tomar and Santarém and retreated south. The siege of Tomar had lasted only five days.

While Sancho and the 500 crusaders were marching south, a further 63 English ships arrived in Lisbon. Rioting broke out between the crusaders and the city's Jewish and Muslim inhabitants. Sancho returned to restore order, but in a few days rioting broke out anew. Some 700 crusaders were arrested. The ships left Lisbon on 24 July.

Dysentery spread through the Almohad ranks. After falling ill himself, al-Manṣūr decided to break off the siege of Silves, where his army was running short on supplies in any case. He retreated with his army, arriving on 26 July in Seville, where he wintered. Although a grand parade was held at the city to mark the return of the Caliph and letters were sent out describing the 'success' of the campaign, the Almohads had in fact failed to make an impression on Portuguese defenses for the time being.

== 1191 expedition ==
In April 1191, al-Manṣūr launched a second attempt to reconquer Silves. Learning from his mistakes the previous years, he decided to march out earlier. This was the eight and last major invasion of Portugal launched by the Almohads. The Caliph first endeavoured to take Alcácer do Sal by force, before settling down to a siege. The importance of this port city lied with the fact that supplies could be brought in by sea if necessary. Fourteen trebuchets were soon unloaded. The 1191 Almohad siege of Alcácer do Sal was much more vigorous than the attack on Tomar the previous year had been. The defenders soon capitulated on terms and were given their liberty. Unlike Torres Novas, which he had razed, Alcácer do Sal was garrisoned by the caliph and placed under the command of Muḥammad ibn Sı̄dray ibn Wazı̄r. For its upkeep, the caliph designated certain funds from Ceuta and Seville.

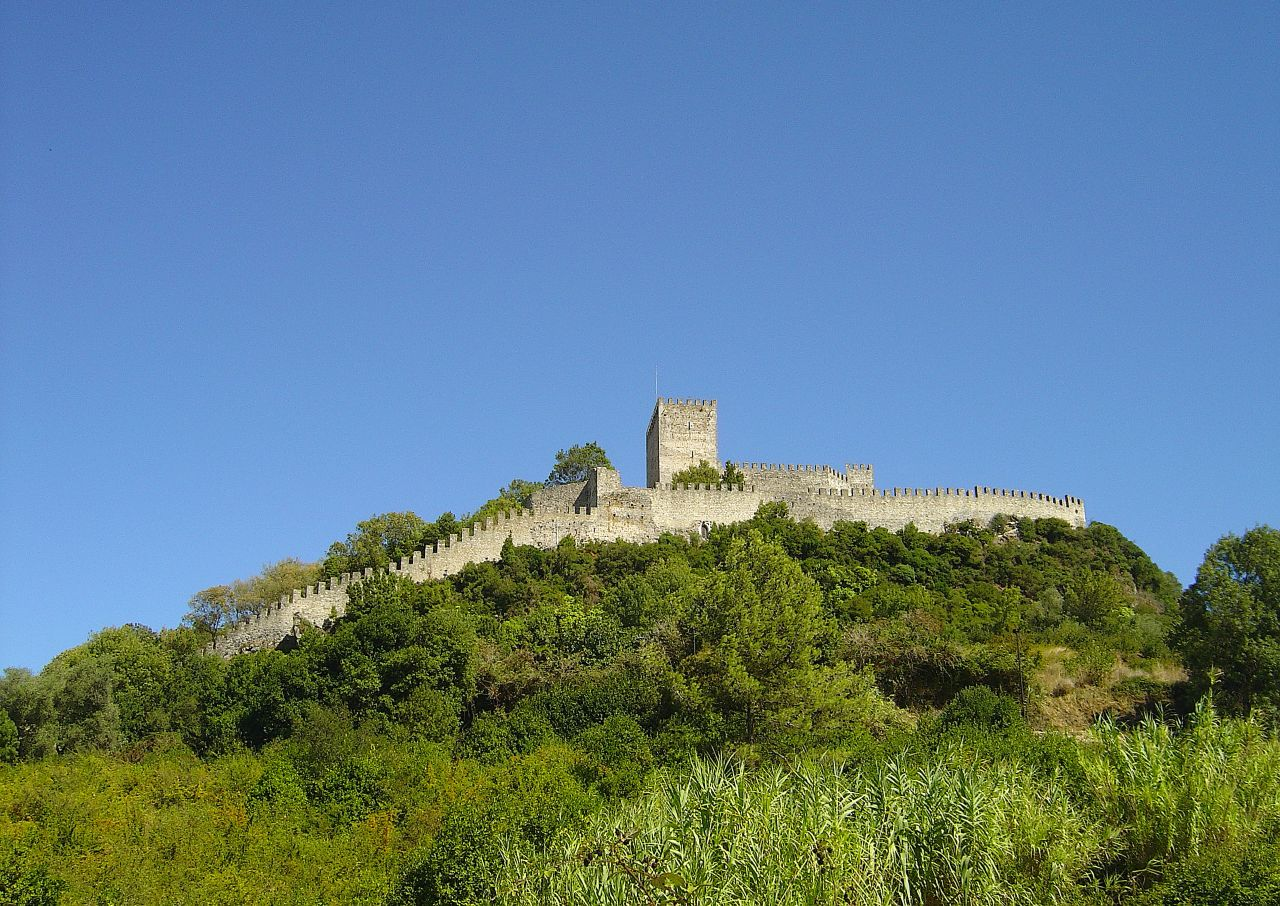
Walls of Leiria

After Alcácer do Sal, the towns Palmela, Coina and Almada were quickly captured. Leiria was destroyed and the Almohads raided as far north as the environs of Coimbra. The castle of Alvor, whose population had been massacred in 1189, was retaken. For his second siege of Silves, al-Manṣūr brought four times as many siege engines as the defenders had. The Christian accounts do not provide many details regarding the siege. They mention that the Almohads bombarded the walls continuously.

On 27 June, the Almohads launched the assault on Silves, surrounding the city with strong forces, filling its ditches and erecting trebuchets to bombard the walls. After thirteen days of bombardment, shortly after dark, while the garrison and the inhabitants were preparing for the night, one of the Almohad spies came forward from the walls and told them of a gap that could allow them to enter. After raising their banners on the walls and beating drums, the Almohads stormed the city. The garrison woke only after the Almohads had taken control of the city and begun massacring the Portuguese. The shocked survivors retreated into the citadel, where they were besieged. They were allowed to send a message to the king asking him for permission to surrender which the king granted. The citadel surrendered on 25 July. The garrison was given ten days to evacuate. They were allowed to leave with their properties.

After signing a five-year truce with Sancho, al-Manṣūr returned to Africa. He had pushed the border north as far as the Tagus, leaving Portugal only one significant fortress to its south, at Évora. The campaign in Silves resulted in the capture of 3,000 slaves.

Silves was sacked and partially destroyed by the German Crusade of 1197, but the region remained in Almohad hands.

== See also ==
- Portugal in the Middle Ages
- Triana raid
- Almohad wars in the Iberian Peninsula

== Bibliography ==
- Barroca, Mário Jorge (2006). "Portugal". In Alan V. Murray (ed.). The Crusades: An Encyclopedia. Vol. 3: K–P. ABC-CLIO. pp. 979–984.
- Black, Jeremy (2020). A Brief History of Portugal. Little, Brown and Company.
- Cushing, Dana (2017). "The Siege of Silves in 1189". Medieval Warfare. 7 (5): 48–53. JSTOR 48578126.
- David, Charles Wendell (1939). "Narratio de Itinere Navali Peregrinorum Hierosolymam Tendentium et Silviam Capientium, A.D. 1189". Proceedings of the American Philosophical Society. 81 (5): 591–676. JSTOR 985010.
- Enan, Muhammad Abdullah (1964). The State of Islam in Andalusia, Vol. III: The Era of Almoravids and Almohads, Part 2 (in Arabic).
- Huici Miranda, Ambrosio (1964). "Las campañas de Yaʿqūb al-Mansūr en 1190 y 1191". Anais da Academia Portuguesa da História. 5: 53–74.
- Kennedy, Hugh (1996). Muslim Spain and Portugal: A Political History of al-Andalus. Routledge.
- Lay, Stephen (2009). The Reconquest Kings of Portugal: Political and Cultural Reorientation on the Medieval Frontier. Palgrave Macmillan.
- Makki, Mahmoud (1994). "The Political History of al-Andalus (92/711–897/1492)". In Salma Khadra Jayyusi (ed.). The Legacy of Muslim Spain. Brill. pp. 3–87.
- Marín, Manuela (1997). "Shilb". In Bosworth, C. E.; van Donzel, E.; Heinrichs, W. P. & Lecomte, G. (eds.). The Encyclopaedia of Islam, Second Edition. Volume IX: San–Sze. Leiden: E. J. Brill. p. 441. ISBN 978-90-04-10422-8.
- O'Callaghan, Joseph F. (2003). Reconquest and Crusade in Medieval Spain. University of Pennsylvania Press.
- Slaughter, John E. (1968). "The Conquest of Silves: A Contemporary Narrative" (PDF). The Journal of the American Portuguese Cultural Society. 2: 25–44.
- Villegas Aristizábal, Lucas (2009). "Revisión de las crónicas de Ralph de Diceto y de la Gesta Regis Ricardi sobre la participación de la Flota Angevina durante la Tercera Cruzada en Portugal" (PDF). Studia Historica: Historia Medieval. 27: 153–170.
