= Castle of Santarém =

Castle in Santarém, Portugal

- Castelo de Santarém
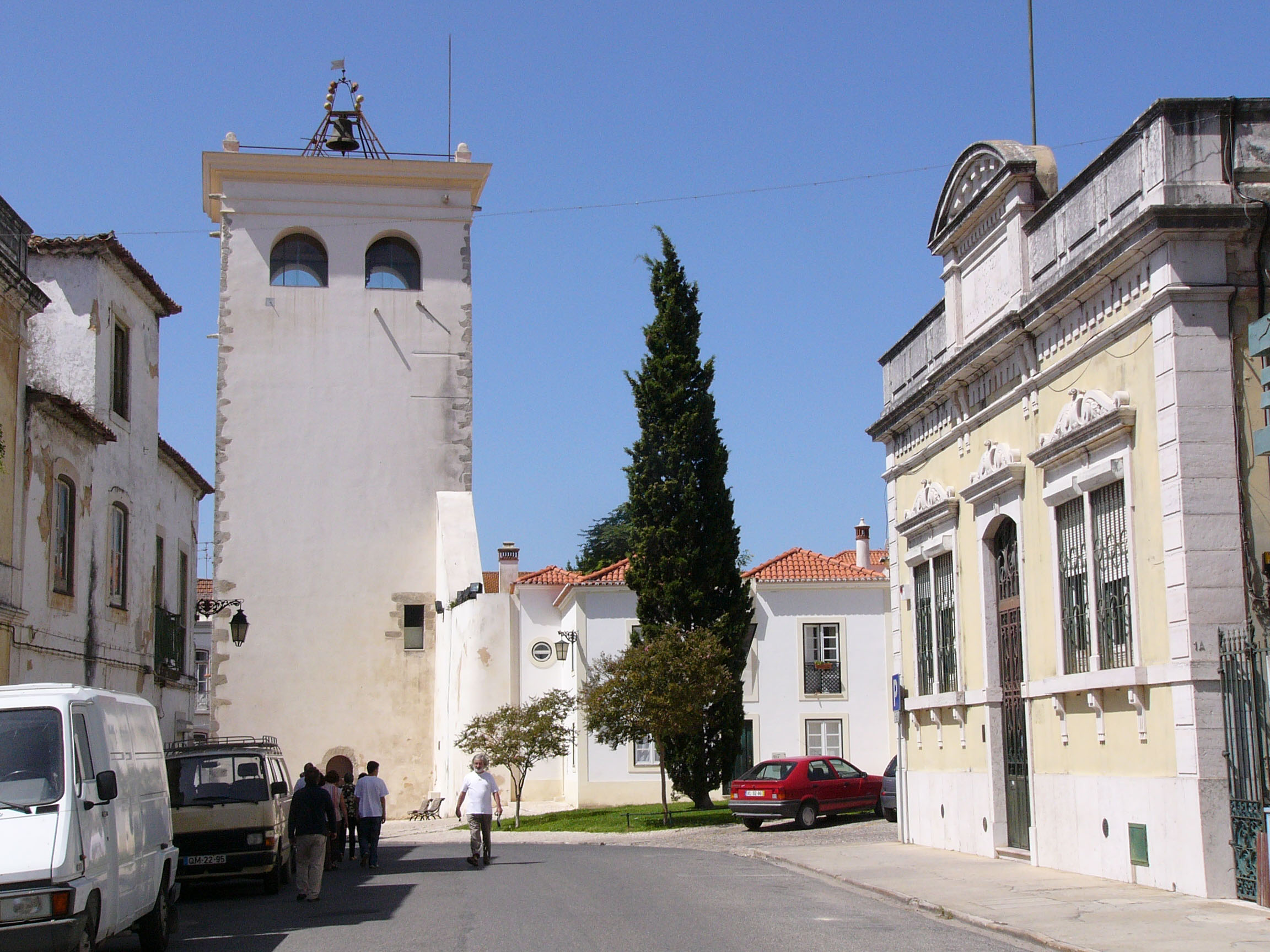

General information
- Status: Preserved
- Coordinates: 39.2337°N 8.6767°W

The Castle of Santarém (Portuguese: Castelo de Santarém) is a medieval castle located in the city of Santarém in the Portuguese county and district of Santarém.

== History ==
=== Early history ===
The early human occupation of its site dates back to a possible prehistoric fortress in the eighth century BC. The Romans reached the town since 138 BCE, designating it as " Scalabi Castro " or simply " Escálabis ".

The village was given to Sunerico in the fifth century (460). The Suebi took over without much difficulty the village in 529. They were later followed by the Visigoths in the seventh century, when it was known as "Sancta Irena". At the beginning of the eighth century, occupied by the Muslims, who called as "Chantirein" or "Chantarim" kept its urban structure and strengthened its agricultural, commercial and administrative vocation.

=== Medieval Era ===
The town passed hands in control, eventually to the Almohad Caliphate. In the midst of the Christian Reconquest of the Iberian Peninsula, Portuguese forces under the command of King Afonso I of Portugal, the first king of Portugal (1112-1185) seized the village and surrounding on 15 March 1147 by surprise in an assault night in the Conquest of Santarém.

==== Muslim sieges ====
The town and its castle were in the path of the Almohad caliph Abu Ya'qub Yusuf I, who attacked the village in 1171 in hopes of expanding. Ferdinand II of León, son of D. Afonso Henriques, dispersed the siege which at the time was in Santarém. A new Muslim attack materializes in 1181, lying in the city the infant Sancho, and the assailants retreated before a counteroffensive of defenders. In 1184, Caliph Abu Yaqub Yusuf made a new offensive to expand. He sent troops to attack, start the four-month-long Siege of Santarém.

=== Late Middle Ages ===
King Denis of Portugal lived the final year of his life in the village. He died in 1325 in the castle.

Under the reign of Ferdinand (1367-1383), the sovereign commissioned the strengthening and expansion of the defenses, such as the reform of the port of Santiago in pointed arch in 1382. With his death, the Country fell into turmoil that came to be known as the 1383-85 Portuguese interregnum crisis. Within the castle walls the widow queen, Leonor Teles, took refuge after Christmas 1383 who once tried to raise banner in the city in support of his daughter, Beatriz, as queen of Portugal and Castile. Having requested the intervention of Castile, She met his son-in-law, John I of Castile, in January 1384 and gave status of landlord of the village and much of the kingdom, with the support of much of the Portuguese nobility. John I of Castile put on the walls of Santarém a Castilian garrison, and the region only returned to Portuguese hands immediately after the battle of Aljubarrota (1385).

One last Infante D. Afonso, Prince of Portugal would mark the history of the town and its castle: some scholars point out the death of the son of John II (1481-1495), in a tragic riding accident in Mouchão of Alfange on the banks of the Tagus River ( 1491), as one of the reasons for the departure from the Court of Santarém village and its consequent decline of administrative importance in the kingdom.

The defenses of Santarem were severely damaged by the earthquake in 1531.

== Post Middle Ages to modern era ==
King John IV (1640-1656) in the War of Portuguese Restoration, and later, King Miguel (1828-1834), in the Liberal Wars, promoted, during their reigns, modernization works and strengthening of the defenses of the village. The latter served the castle of the village as a stronghold from October 1833 until 17 May 1834.

With peace and economic progress, it became a city in December 1868. A portion of the castle is well preserved. The IGEPSAR arm of the Portuguese government classified the castle as a place of Public Interest.
