= Silves Cathedral =

Building in Silves, Portugal

Coordinates: 37.1901°N 8.4387°W

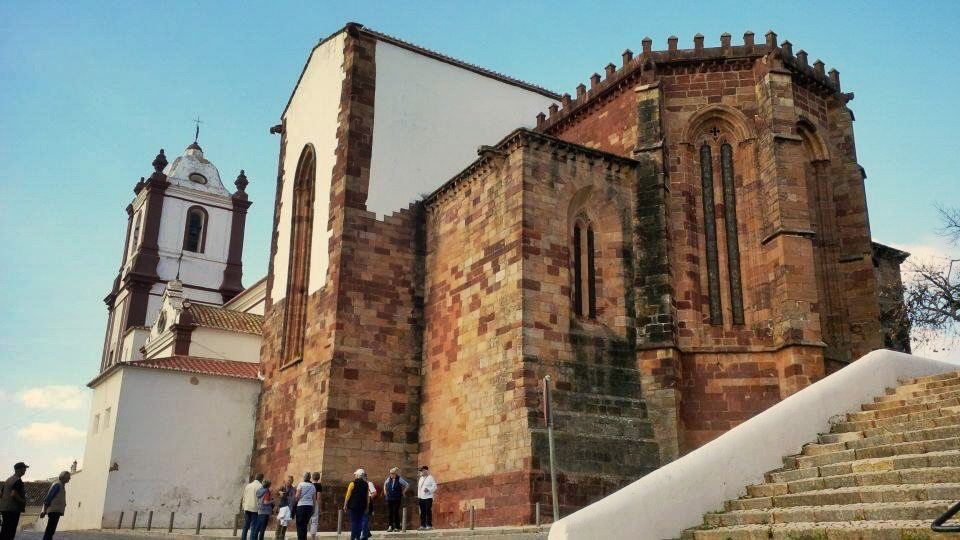
Gothic apse of Silves Cathedral.

The Silves Cathedral (Portuguese: Sé Catedral de Silves) is a former cathedral in the city of Silves, in the Algarve region of southern Portugal. A mosque, built during the Moorish rule of the Iberian Peninsula, was originally located in its current place, and was later mostly restructured and converted into a Catholic cathedral after the Reconquista. Although having some Baroque characteristics, it is mostly Gothic in nature and it is considered to be the main Gothic monument in the Algarve and one of the most important landmarks in southern Portugal. It was classified as a national monument on June 29, 1922.

== History ==
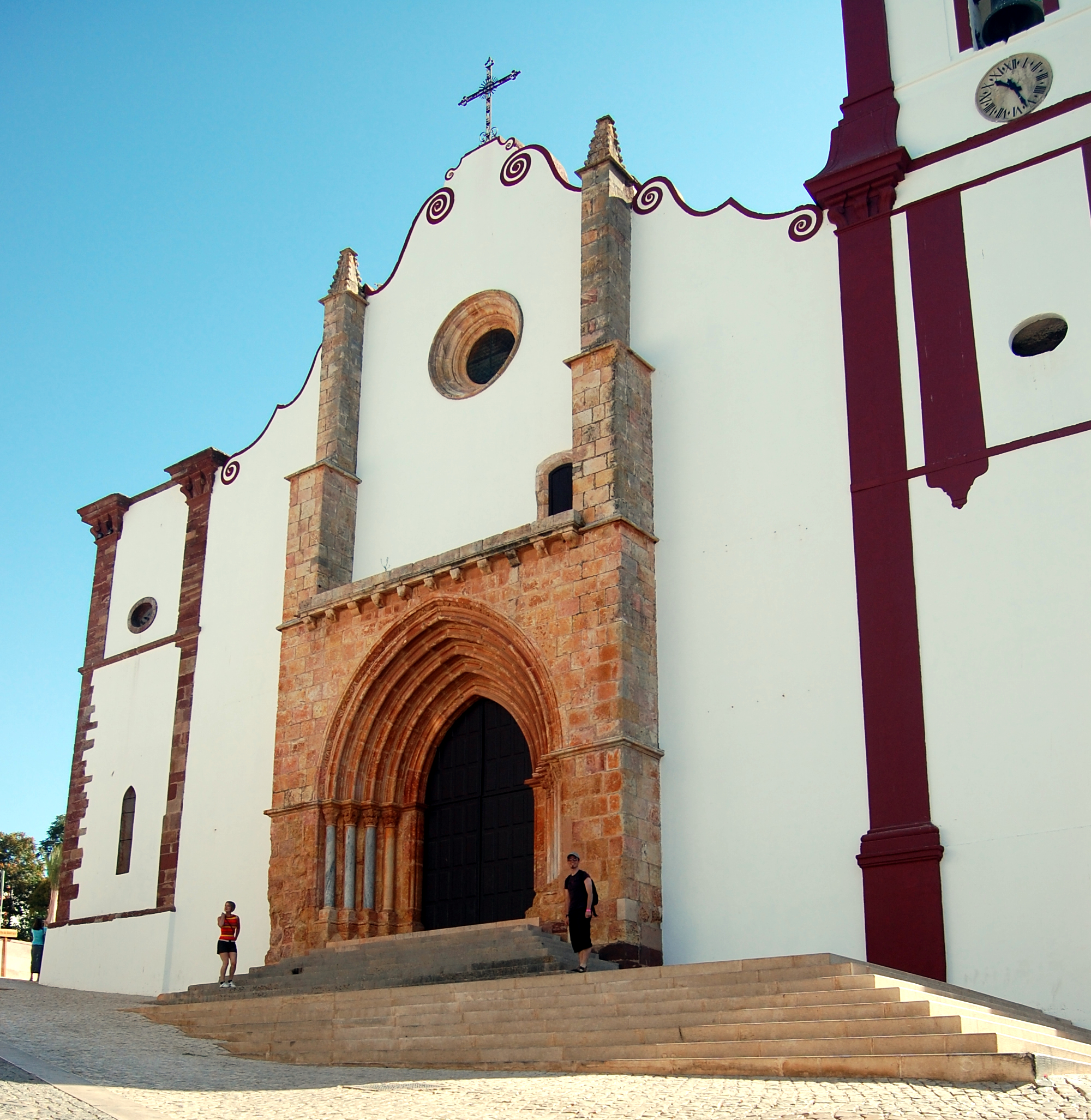
Gothic main portal of Silves Cathedral.

The details about the foundation and building of Silves Cathedral are unclear. In the process of the Reconquista, Moorish Silves was conquered in 1189 by King Sancho I of Portugal, but since the city was retaken by the Moors in 1191, it is unlikely that a cathedral was built at this time. Only in 1242 was Silves definitely reconquered by Christian knights during the reign of King Afonso III, and it is believed that this king was responsible for beginning the construction of Silves Cathedral as the seat of a newly founded Algarve diocese.

The works proceeded with difficulty, and in 1352 the cathedral was damaged by a strong earthquake. In the 1440s, the cathedral workshop was given a great impulse by King Afonso V. This building campaign produced the apse with its three chapels, the transept and the main portal, in Gothic style, dating from the 1470s. The three-aisled nave was only finished in the early 16th century.

When King John II died unexpectedly in Alvor (Portimão), near Silves, in 1495, he was provisionally buried in the main chapel of Silves Cathedral. In 1499, in the presence of King Manuel I, his remains were exhumed and transferred to the Monastery of Batalha, where John II was permanently re-buried; however, his tomb slab with a Gothic inscription is still located on the floor of the main chapel of Silves Cathedral. Many important personalities of Silves, from nobility to crusaders, explorers, bishops and judges as well as local inhabitants from different walks of life were buried in the cathedral during the 15th and 16th centuries, as attested by the many tomb slabs on its floor, some of the most notable ones being Bishop D. Fernando Coutinho, present in the negotiations of the Treaty of Tordesillas and a defender of the Jews, Egas Moniz Teles, nobleman under king Manuel I, whose family were amongst the first inhabitants of the Madeira island, judge João do Rego and his son in law Gastão da Ilha, Squire to Infante John.

Economic difficulties and a diminishing population plagued the history of Silves in the 15th and 16th centuries, leading to the bishop staying for long periods away from Silves. The most notable of the bishops at this time was Jerónimo Osório, one of the greatest Portuguese humanists and theologians. It was during his rule, in 1577, that the bishopric seat was transferred from Silves to Faro, a more prosperous city located by the coast. In the next centuries the interior of the church was enriched with Mannerist and Baroque altarpieces, some of which still exist.

The Great earthquake of 1755 struck a terrible blow to Silves and its cathedral and destroyed part of the nave. The building was repaired and modified, replacing the simple Gothic forms of the upper part of the main façade with Rococo volutes. The bell tower and the south portal are also 18th-century additions.

In the 20th century, an extensive renovation of Silves Cathedral suppressed many of the Baroque additions and returned the building to a more "medieval" look.

== Art and architecture ==
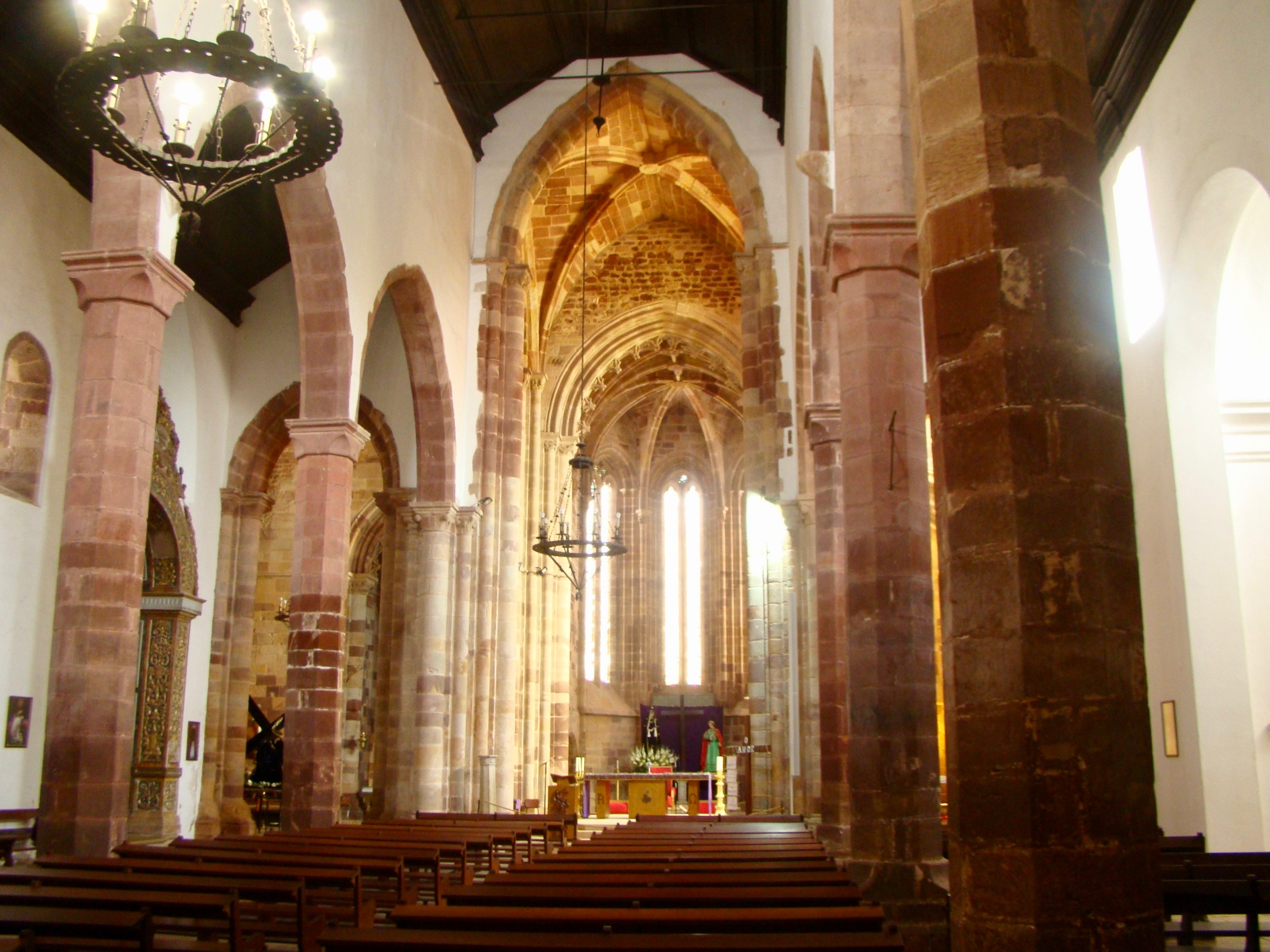
View towards the main chapel.

From the outside, a striking aspect of Silves Cathedral is the contrast between the whitewashed surfaces of the walls and the red sandstone (grés de Silves) of the apse, windows and main portal.

The main portal, executed in the 1470s, is inserted on a stepped rectangular moulding (alfiz), a common feature on the façades of Portuguese mediaeval buildings since the Romanesque era. Other primitive features of the portal are the figurative corbels of the upper cornice of the moulding, representing animal and human faces. The portal consists of a series of four columns and several pointed-arch archivolts. The outer archivolt is decorated with a series of reliefs of vegetal motifs and human figures, some playing musical instruments. The decoration of the capitals of the columns reveals the influence of the Batalha workshop, which was active in the 15th century. The portal of the main church of Portimão, located nearby, is almost a replica of the one in Silves and is believed to have been executed by the same artisans. The South portal is a Baroque addition (18th century).

Silves Cathedral is a Latin cross church with a three-aisled nave, transept and three chapels in the east end. The east side of the church with transept was built earlier (mid-15th century) than the nave (probably early 16th century). The eastern chapels and transept are covered by Gothic stone rib vaulting, while the nave aisles are covered by a simple wooden roof. It is likely that the original plan called for the whole church to be covered by stone vaulting like other Portuguese cathedrals built at the time, like the Cathedral of Guarda. The aisles of the nave are separated by arches of pointed profile supported by columns of octagonal cross section. The south transept arm is illuminated by a large mullioned window with Gothic tracery.

== Gallery ==
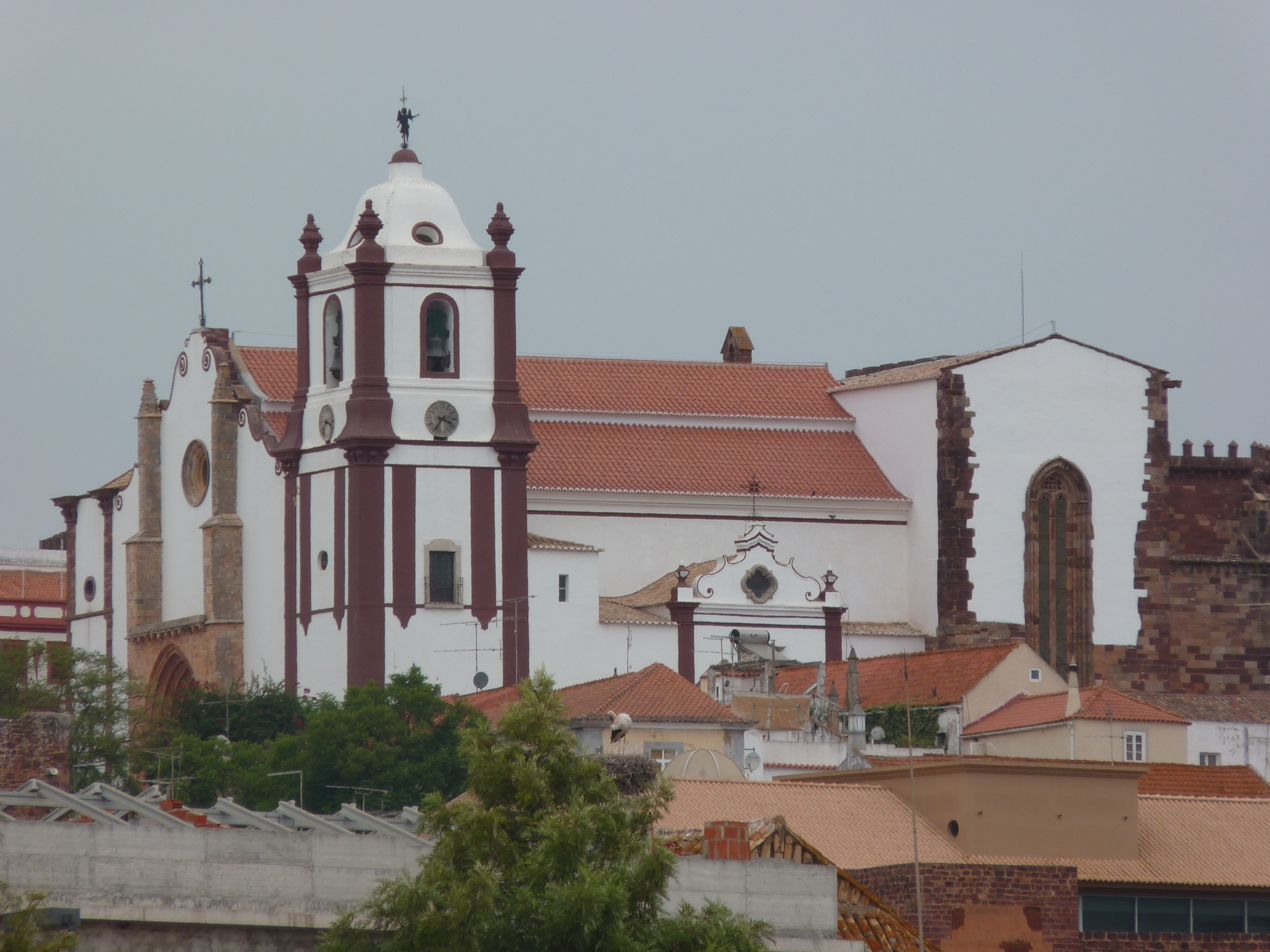
Partial view of the cathedral from the outside

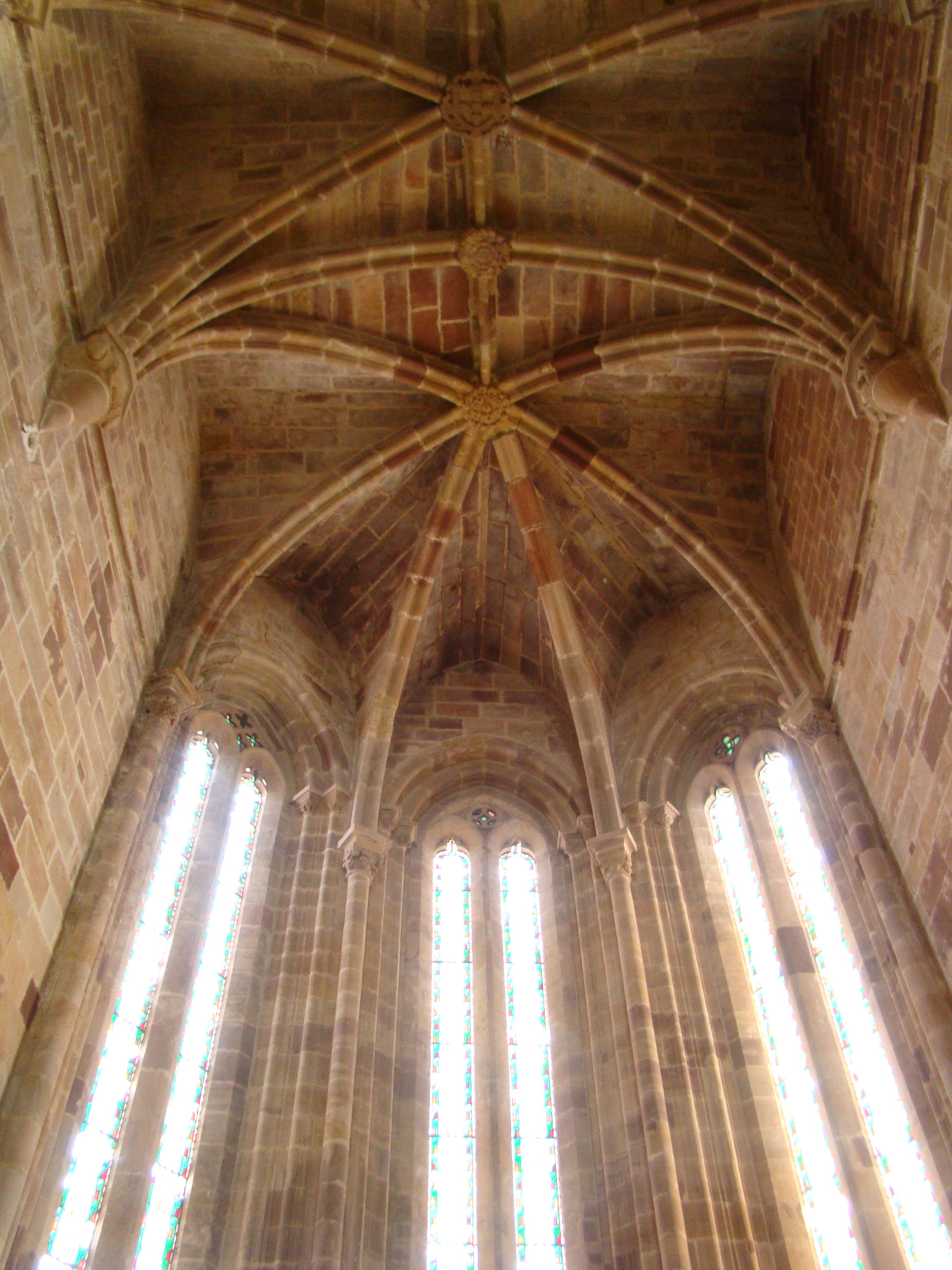
The choir's ceiling

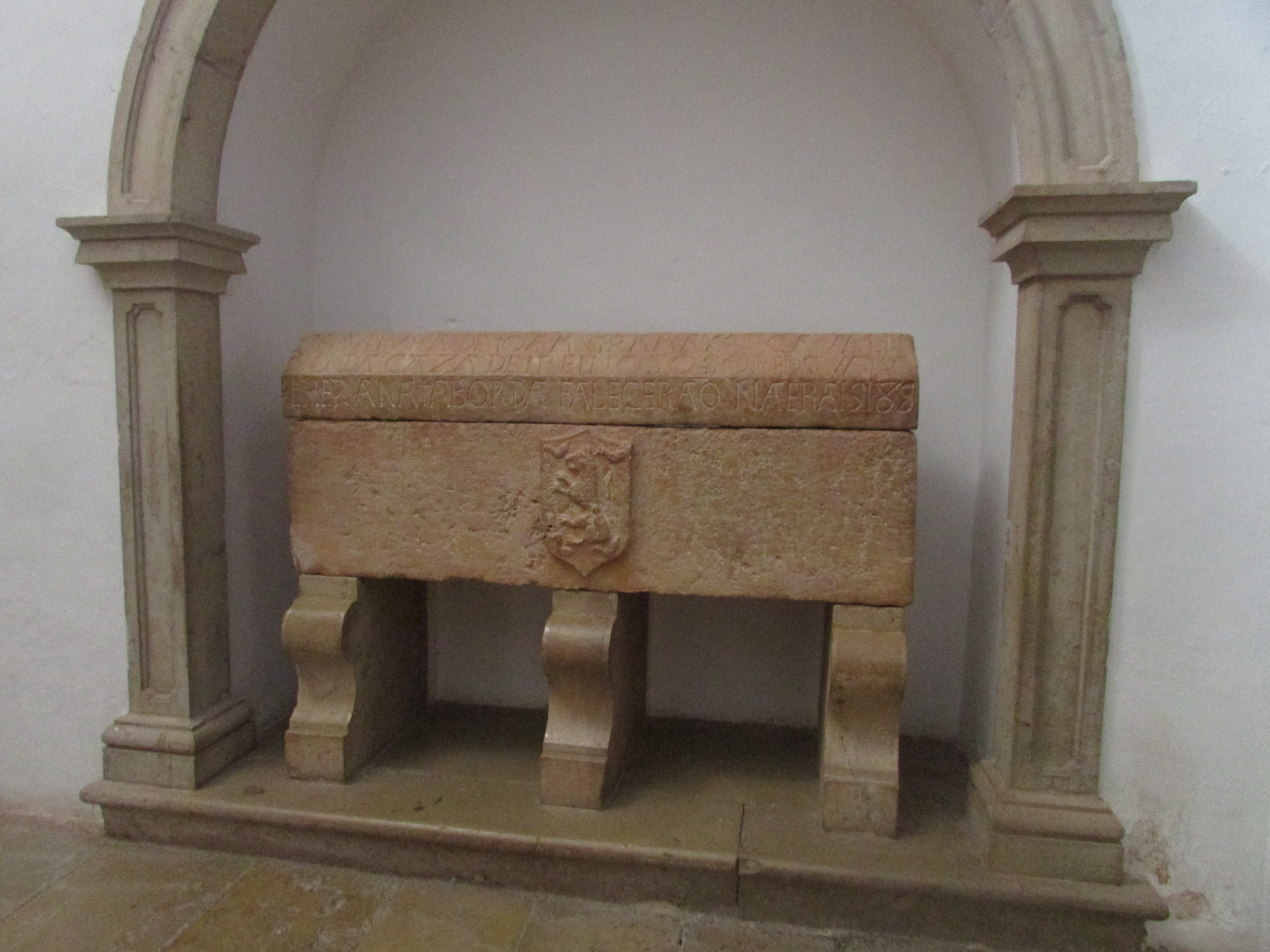
The carved stone Sarcophagi Tomb of Crusader João Gramacho and his wife Ana Taborda

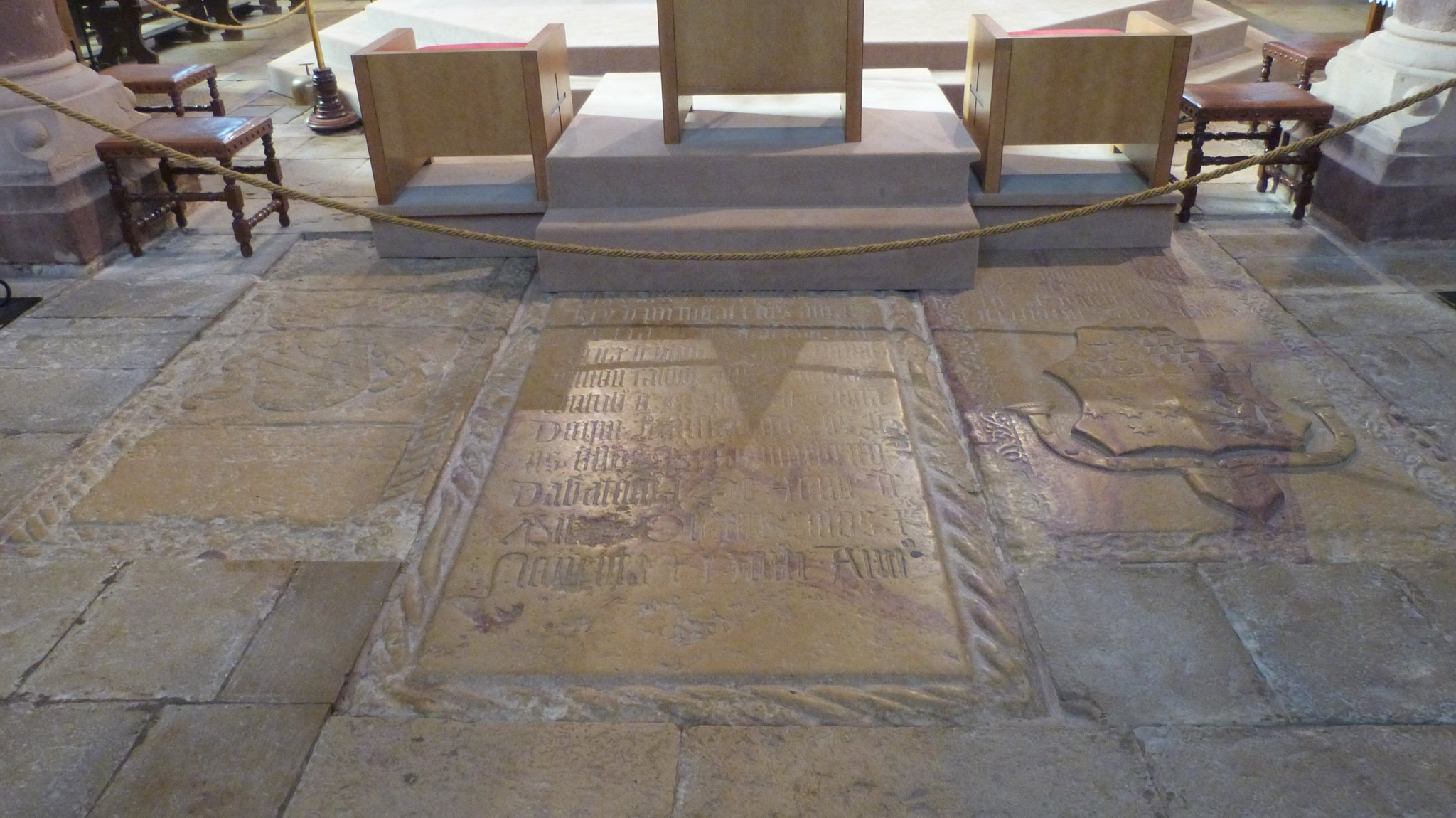
The stones of Vincent Raposa Viegas on the left, King John II in the middle, and bishop Fernando Coutinho, on the right

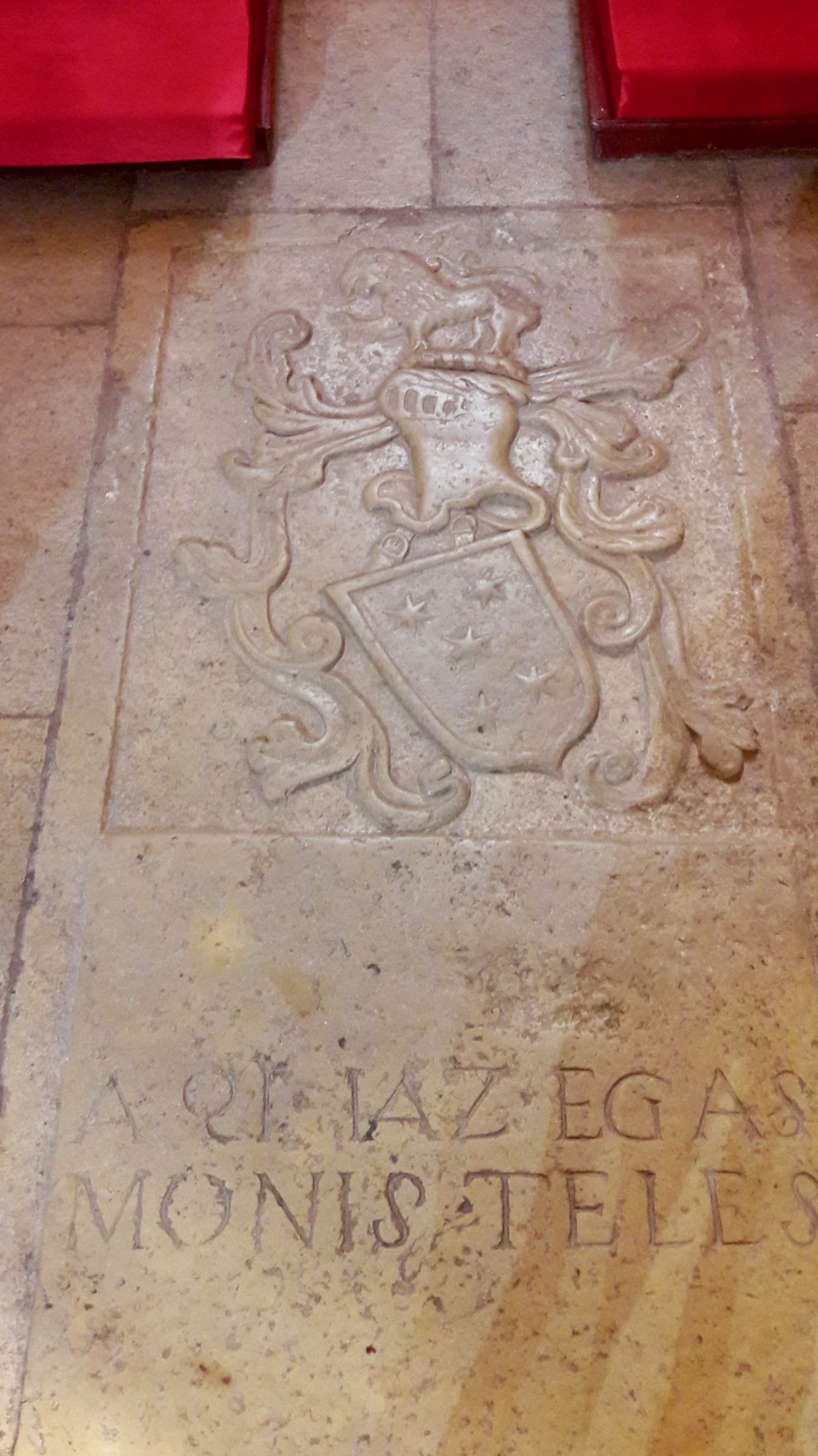
Tomb of nobleman Egas Moniz Teles

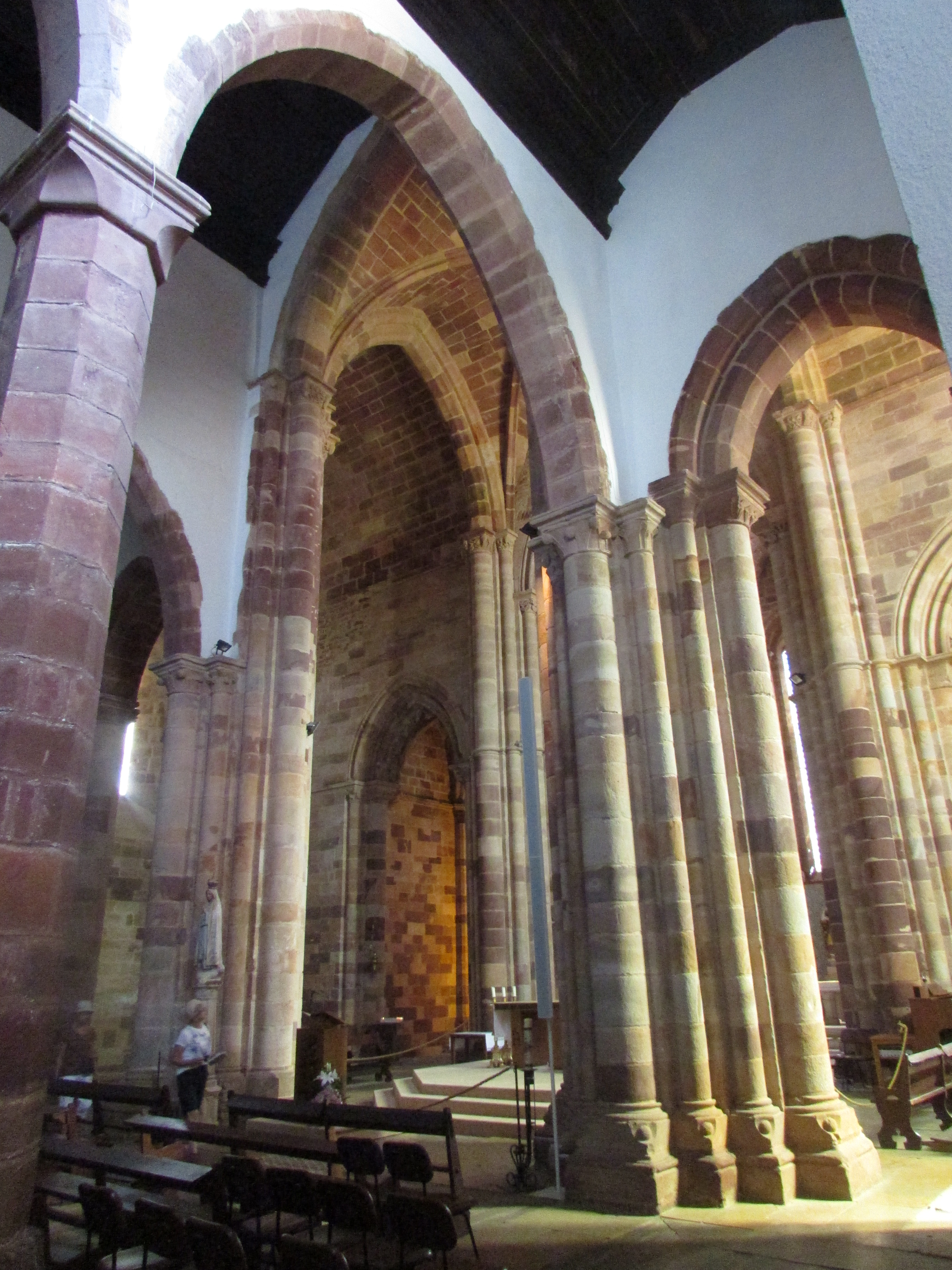
Details of the pillars and arches

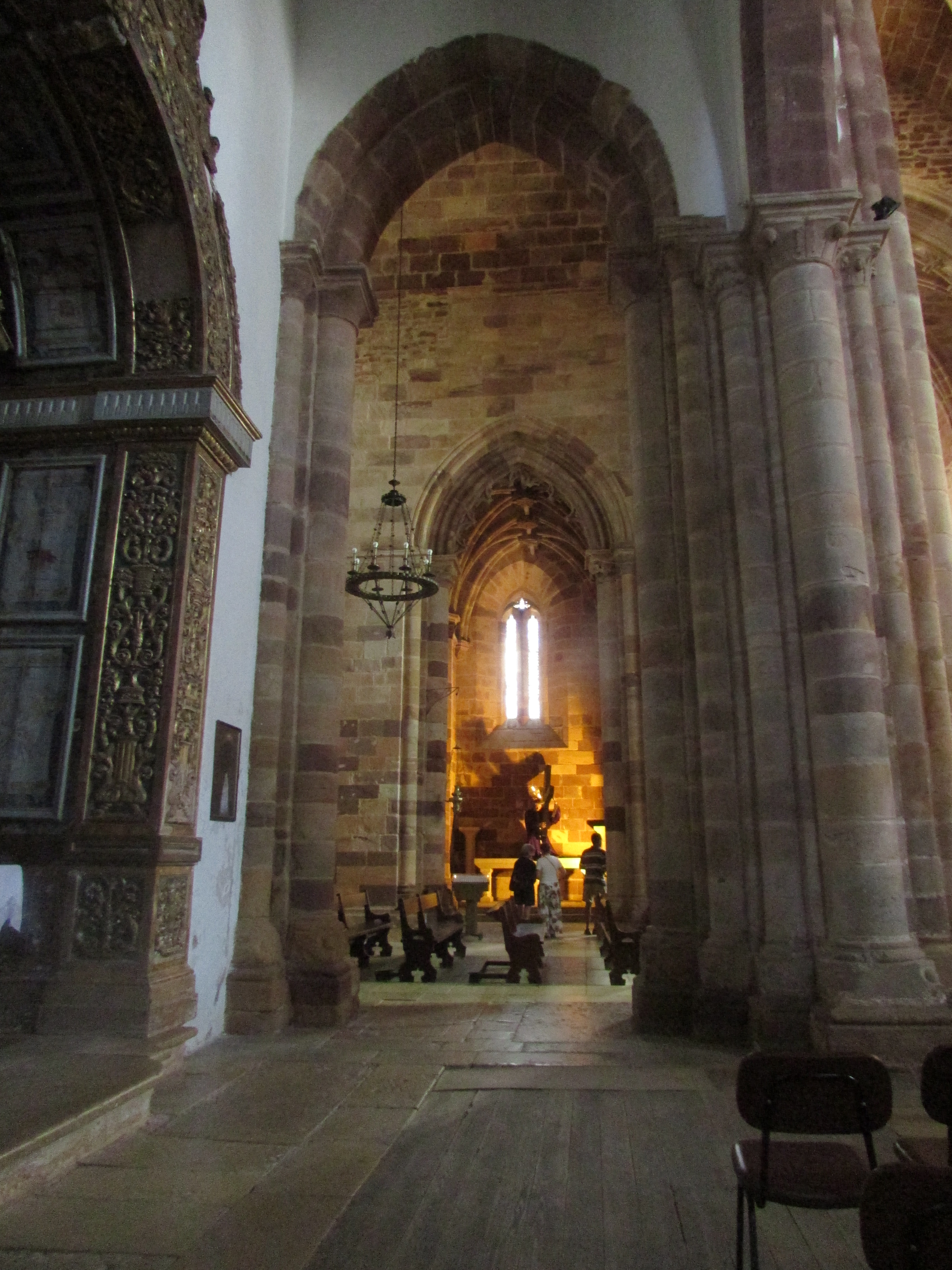
Chapel of our lord of stations

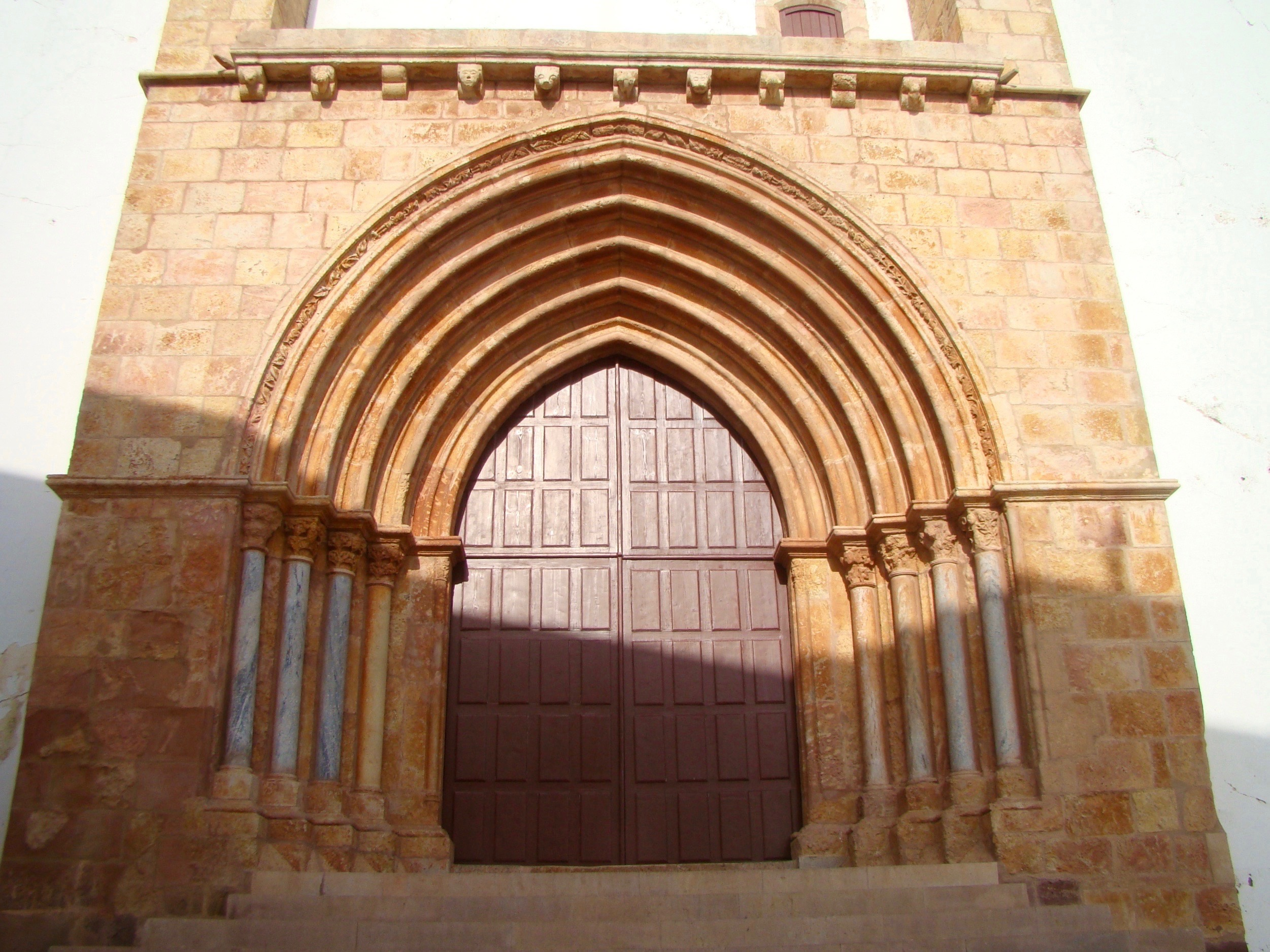
Main portal

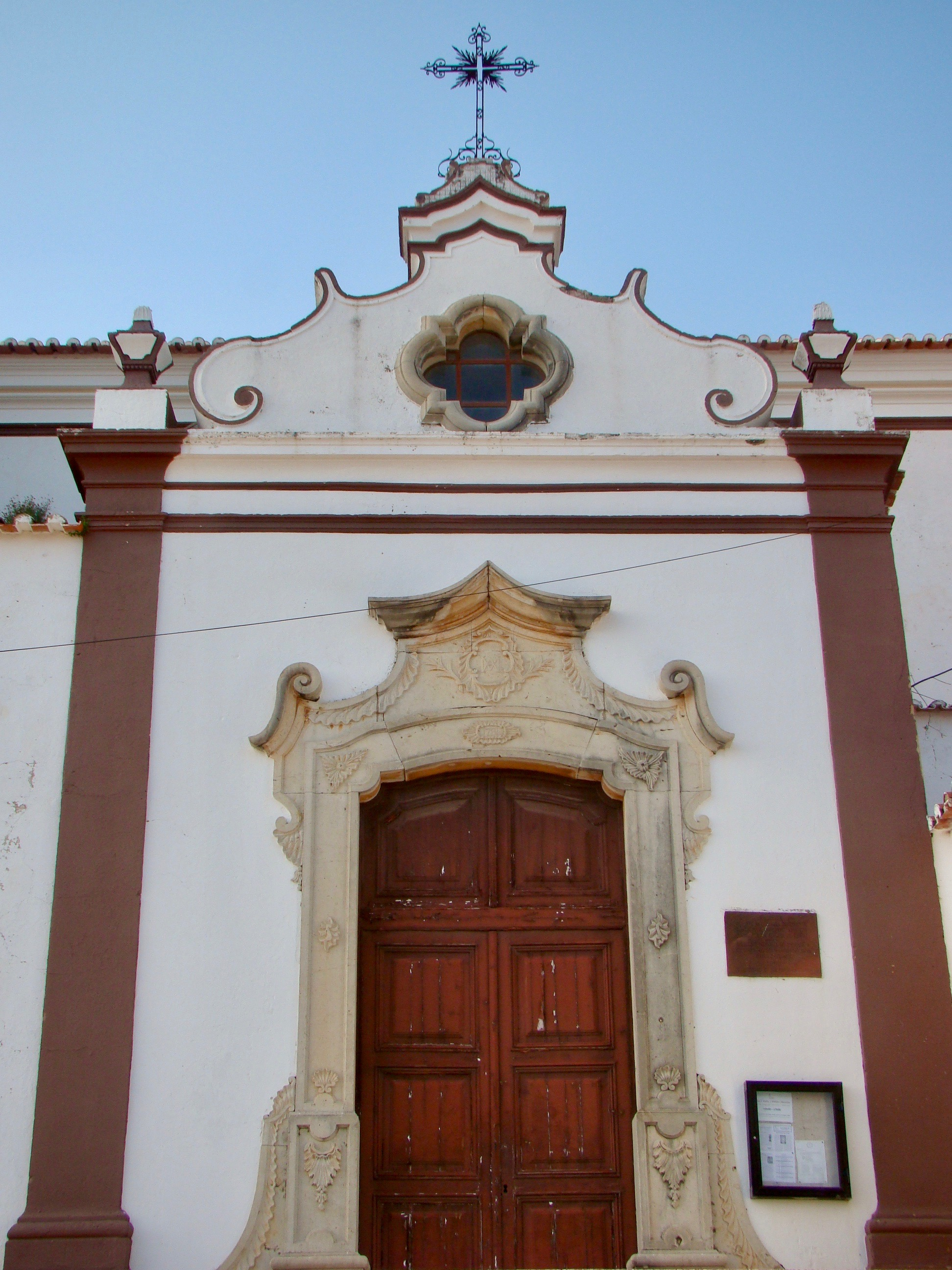
Lateral portal

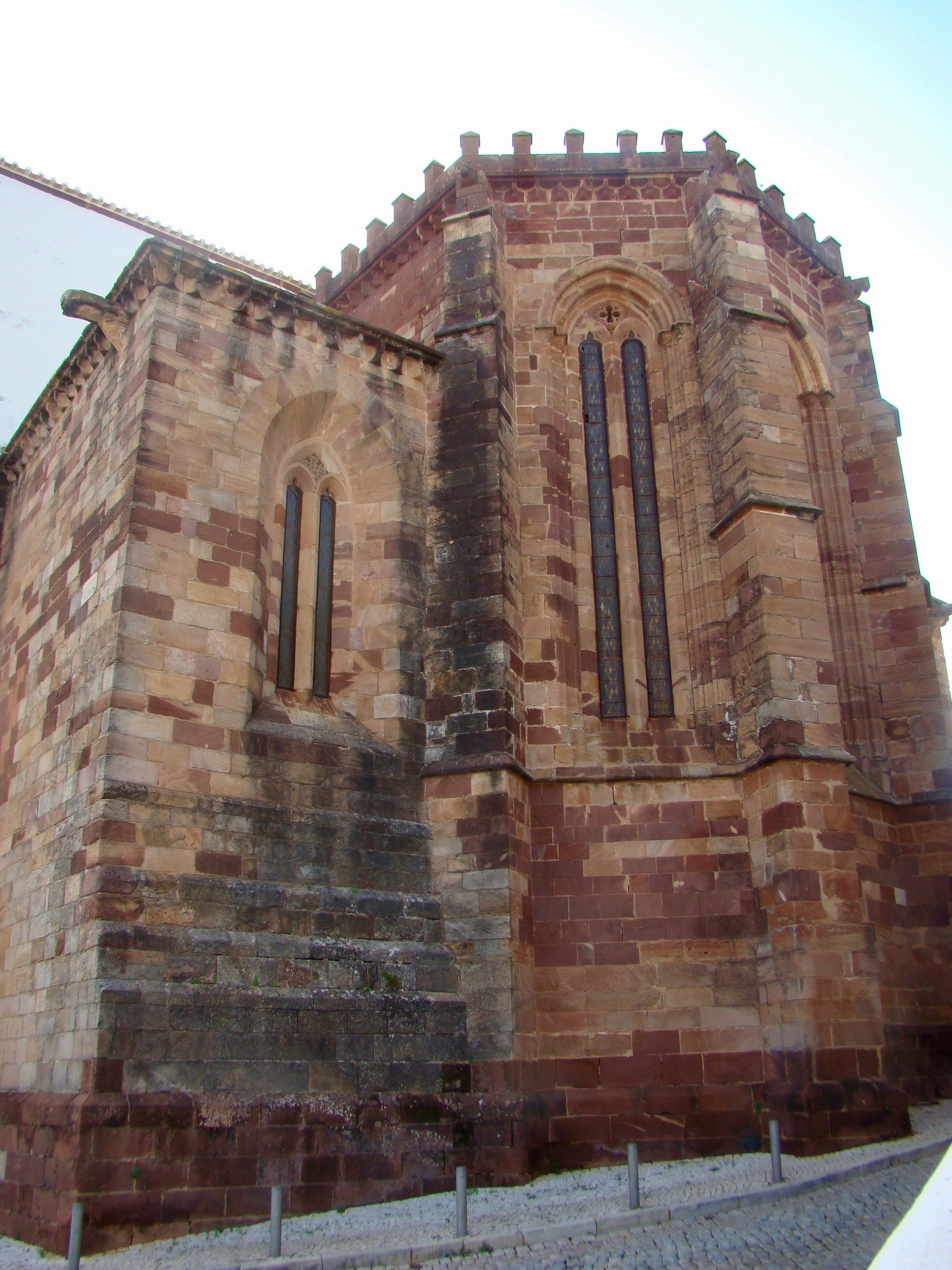
Lateral view of the Gothic apse
