= Charles Wendell David =

American medievalist and librarian

Charles Wendell David

Charles Wendell David (1885–1984) was a noted American bibliophile, medievalist and librarian. He worked tirelessly both to reconstruct Europe's war-torn repositories and to establish new libraries in the United States.

== Biography ==
David went to college on scholarships, earning a doctorate from Harvard in 1918 and achieved a Rhodes scholarship before returning to establish his academic career at Harvard and Bryn Mawr. David pioneered the "open access" concept of the college library, throwing open the doors to all students (as opposed to traditional "classed" libraries open only to faculty, "upper" or "lower" classmen) before arriving in Philadelphia to serve the University of Pennsylvania as its first director of libraries, where he transformed their dilapidated collection into America's first centralized, open-access library in its modern form.

Prof. David retired to West Chester, Pennsylvania, where he continued to mentor and educate until his death in 1984.

== Historical studies ==
Empathizing with the financial and travel problems of his students in European history, and anticipating the return of Europe to censorship and war, Prof. David travelled Europe in the mid-1930s determined to create rotogravure copies of manuscripts so that these works would remain available to American scholars (at least in copy). Consequently, certain of his rotogravures are the only remaining images of manuscripts destroyed or damaged by the war, or that have since become deteriorated or misplaced. This collection became part of the Modern Language Association photo imagery collection at the Library of Congress, where it remains today.

David published his critical edition of a rare Third Crusade manuscript through the American Philosophical Association in 1939, using one of his rotogravures to complete his study. This manuscript was in fair condition before the war, but its pages are now blank – this manuscript contains very important information about medieval sailing and pilgrimage that would have been lost without Prof. David's work.

Medievalist Dana Cushing now studies and lectures on Prof David's rotogravure copy of the manuscript. She provides a free, public-access, digital copy of the manuscript and of Prof. David's critical edition of it (Narratio de Itinere Navali Peregrinorum Hierosolymam Tendentium et Silvam Capientium A.D. 1189) by kind permission of the Library of Congress which owns the rotogravure copies, the Accademia delle Scienze di Torino which owns the original manuscript, and the American Philosophical Society which published David's 1939 article.

Over 80 years later, David's book about the Siege of Lisbon and the De expugnatione Lyxbonensi remains the authoritative study, entitled De expugnatione Lyxbonensi: The conquest of Lisbon. The book was recently revised by noted Crusades historian Jonathan Phillips for a paperback re-issue. Most of David's medieval and librarianship books remain available, if not in print. This includes Robert Curthose, Duke of Normandy (1920), a biography of Robert Curthose, the eldest son of William the Conqueror.

== Legacy ==
The public can visit two libraries he founded: a library for America's history of her seas and sailing located at Mystic Seaport, Connecticut, and a library for America's industrial heritage located at Longwood, Delaware.
