= Siege of Silves (1189) =

1189 siege

- Part of the Third Crusade and the Reconquista
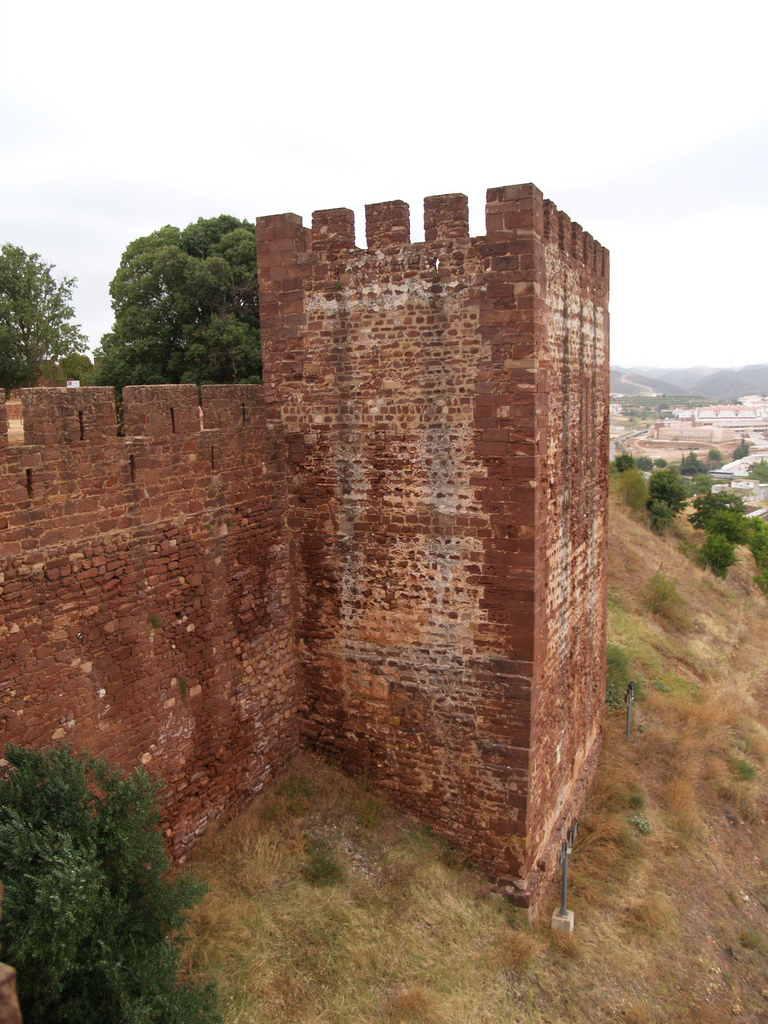
- A tower of Silves today
Date	21 July – 3 September 1189
Location	Silves, al-Gharb 37°11′13″N 8°26′20″W
Result	Portuguese–Crusader victory
Territorial changes	Silves and ten other castles in al-Gharb acquired by Portugal

Belligerents
Kingdom of Portugal; Crusaders from northern Europe	Almohad Caliphate

Commanders and leaders
Sancho I of Portugal	ʿĪsā ibn Abī Ḥafṣ ibn ʿĀlī

Strength
75 ships 3,500 crusaders + Portuguese army	15,800 inhabitants 400 prisoners

The siege of Silves was an action of the Third Crusade and the Portuguese Reconquista in 1189. The city of Silves in the Almohad Caliphate was besieged from 21 July until 3 September by the forces of Portugal and a group of crusaders from northern Europe on their way to the siege of Acre. The defenders capitulated on terms, the city was handed over to Portugal and the crusaders took a portion of the spoils.

The call for a new crusade went out in 1187, following the loss of Jerusalem. The first fleets from the north arrived in Portuguese waters in the spring of 1189. One of these sacked Alvor and massacred its inhabitants some weeks before the fleet that would attack Silves had assembled in Lisbon in early July. The combined Portuguese–crusader fleet contained 75 ships—37 cogs of the northern type and 38 galleys. It carried an army of 3,500 crusaders, while King Sancho I of Portugal marched overland with his own army.

The crusaders camped before Silves on 20 July and launched an assault with scaling ladders the following day. They successfully captured the walled lower town and began preparing siege engines. Sancho arrived on 29 July and his army a day later, at which point the city was completely surrounded. The assault with engines began on 6 August. Attempts to undermine the walls and towers began on 9 August and continued, with varied success, until the end. The defenders countermined and there was fighting underground, possibly including the use of Greek fire by the Almohads. On 10 August, the breastwork was captured. By mid-August, the defenders were suffering from a shortage of water. On 1 September, the Portuguese offered terms and the defenders agreed to negotiate. The crusaders refused to relinquish their right to plunder, but the defenders were permitted to leave in peace. On 3 September, the city was handed over to Sancho, who in turn permitted its occupation by the crusaders for dividing the booty. They eventually abandoned the city under pressure and, after establishing a garrison, Sancho left on 12 September.

The fall of Silves meant that nine outlying castles subject to its Almohad governor came under Portuguese control. In addition, Albufeira surrendered. The crusaders, however, refused to help besiege Faro and sailed away on 20 September to resume their crusade. The success at Silves was relatively short-lived. In April 1190, the Caliph Yaʿqūb al-Manṣūr launched an offensive intending to take back Silves. His first effort failed, but he renewed his invasion in April 1191 and Silves was recaptured in July.

== Sources ==
A page from the Narratio de itinere navali, the most valuable source on the siege of 1189

The main source for the siege of Silves is an eyewitness account. The Narratio de itinere navali (Account of the Seaborne Journey) is a short but detailed Latin narrative of the crusader expedition from northern Germany told from a crusader's perspective. It was composed shortly after the capture of Silves, certainly before 1191. In the only manuscript of the text, it is accompanied by the Epistola de morte Friderici imperatoris (Letter on the Death of the Emperor Frederick), which demonstrates a connection between the naval expedition and Frederick Barbarossa's overland crusade.

The next most important source, the Ymagines Historiarum of the English chronicler Ralph of Diceto, is also in Latin and from a northern perspective. Also from England are the Gesta regis Henrici secundi and the Chronica of Roger of Howden that relies on it. There is confusion in some sources, such as the Itinerarium peregrinorum et gesta regis Ricardi and the Chronicon of Robert of Auxerre, between the sack of Alvor and the capture of Silves. Nevertheless, Robert's account made its way into the chronicle of William of Nangis, the Chronicon Turonense and a lost work by a certain Hugo, copied by Vicente Salgado into his Memorias Ecclesiasticas do Reino do Algarve. A supposed letter from Pope Clement III to the Byzantine emperor Isaac II is in reality a 16th-century forgery. Its reference to the conquest of Silves is derived from the confused account of Robert of Auxerre.

The only sources to originate in Portugal are the contemporary but terse Chronicon Conimbricense and the Crónica de 1419. The section of the latter devoted to the reign of Sancho I claims to be based on an earlier contemporary source, but is obviously reworked.

The most valuable Arabic sources for the loss of Silves are the Bayān al-mughrib of Ibn ʿIdhārī, specifically, its third book covering the Almohad period (1170–1266), and the Almohad history of ʿAbd al-Wāḥid al-Marrākushī. It is also mentioned in the works of Ibn al-Athīr, Ibn Khaldūn, Ibn Abī Zarʿ and al-Maqqarī.

== Background ==
=== Status of Silves ===
Silves (Arabic Shilb or Xelb) lies on the Arade some 8 miles (13 km) upriver from the coast. It is sited on a hill 200 feet (61 m) high. The river was crossed at that point by a bridge. The city's population in 1189 was 15,800, according to the Narratio. It came under indirect Almohad rule in 1146, when it was captured from the Almoravids and placed under the rule of Ibn Qasī, leader of the local Murīdūn sect. It came under direct Almohad rule in 1157. It was the capital of the province of al-Gharb. Its governor in 1189 was ʿĪsā ibn Abī Ḥafṣ ibn ʿĀlī. According to Ibn ʿIdhārī, he was "very experienced in the defence of the frontiers."

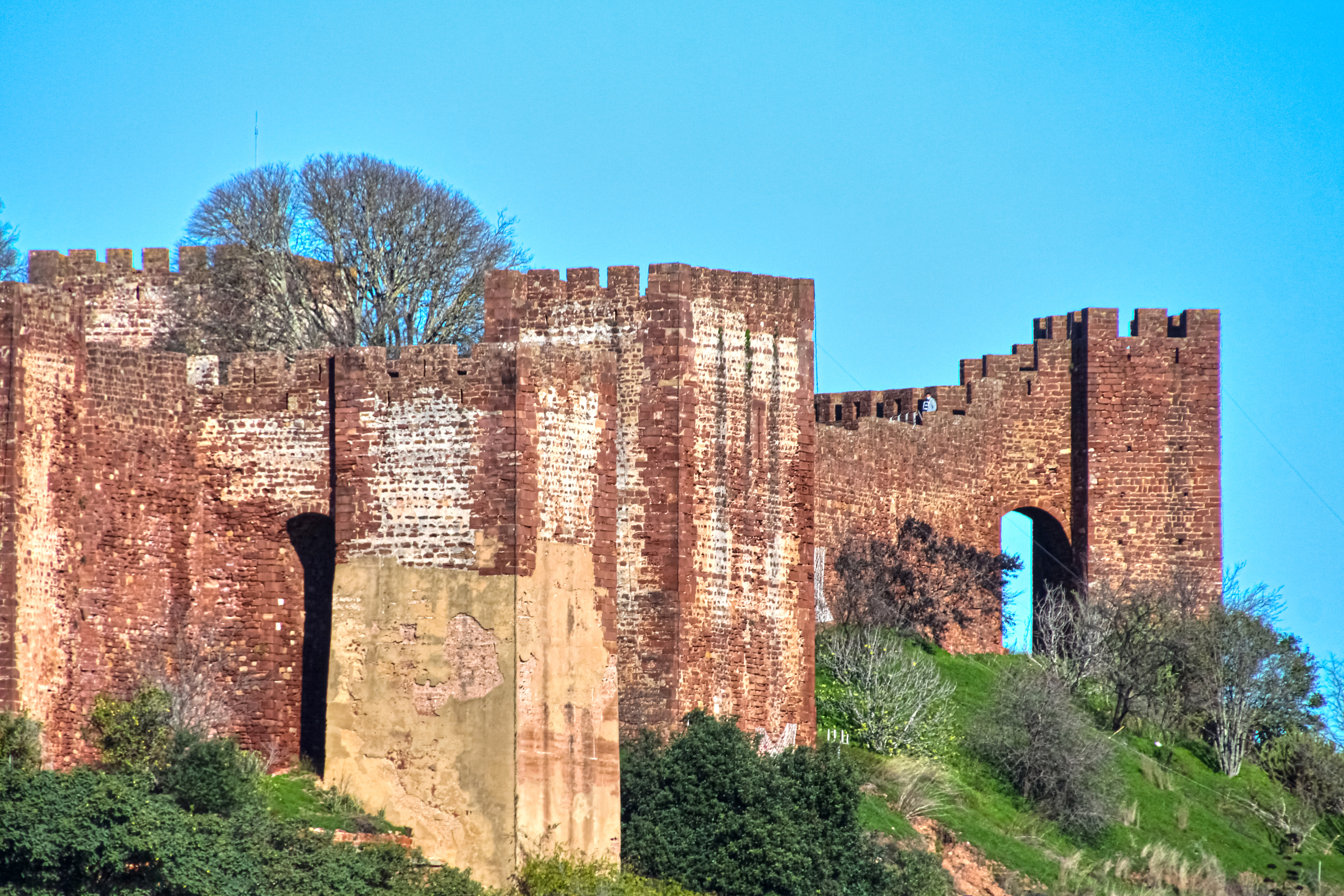
Part of the walls of Silves today, showing an albarrana tower

As a place of strategic significance, the fortifications of Silves were extensive, but perhaps not "fully developed" in 1189. They had been sufficient to require siege engines during the siege of 1063. The Almohads had made repairs after taking full control in 1157. The hilltop was surrounded by a rampart of rammed earth faced with stone. It had at least seventeen towers of the albarrana type, that is, set outside the wall and connected to it by means of elevated walkways. The tower below the main gate was especially large. They were not hollow structures but rather elevated fighting platforms, solid to a height equal with the walls. Two parallel walls led down from the hilltop to the river, protecting the water supply, which was also protected by four towers. The author of the Narratio calls the walled section leading to the river a corrasce, from the local Romance word couraça, "breastwork". The suburb at the base of the hill had a weaker system of walls and was protected by a single tower. The fortifications are described in detail by al-Idrīsī.

Despite his experience, Ibn Abī Ḥafṣ had not properly prepared supplies for an extended siege. There had been a drought, which left the water in the harbour of Silves so low that five galleys—vessels of low draught—were stuck there. In addition to shortages of food and water, there was a shortage of armour and soldiers. Four hundred Christian prisoners had to be dragooned into service.

=== Portuguese planning ===
In October 1187, Jerusalem was captured by the Ayyubids and Pope Gregory VIII issued a call for a new crusade to recover it in his bull Audita tremendi. King Sancho sent a letter to Gregory, which was misinterpreted in later tradition as showing an intention to join the planned crusade. Although Sancho probably did not intend to go on crusade, he did perceive the value of crusaders sailing to Portugal on their way east. Such a fleet had assisted in the conquest of Lisbon in 1147 during the Second Crusade.

The first crusader fleet to arrive consisted of fifty to sixty ships from Denmark and Frisia. They arrived in June 1189. At Sancho's invitation, they helped take Alvor. Contrary to conventions, they massacred its inhabitants. As soon as they had taken their share of the plunder, they sailed on. Sancho and his forces to return to Lisbon to await the next group of crusaders.

== Crusaders' voyage (April–July) ==
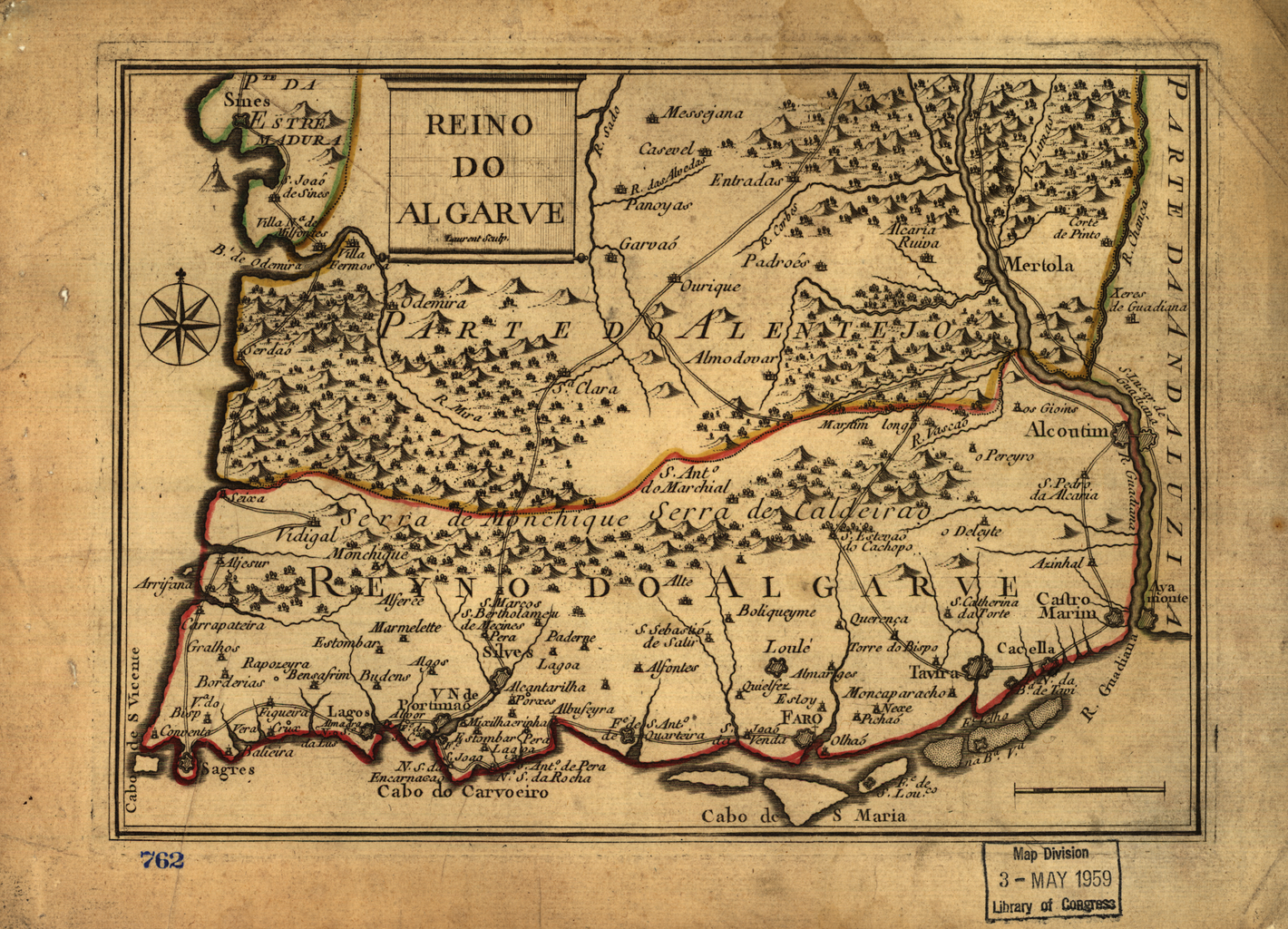
18th-century map of the 13th-century al-Gharb, showing Silves and the principal places in the Almohad province in 1189

In April 1189, a fleet of eleven ships of crusaders bound for the Holy Land left Bremen. The author of the Narratio was on one of these ships. He records that composition of the crusader company was variable, as some joined up at a later point in the voyage while others left to find their own way to the Holy Land. They seem mostly to have come from the north of the kingdom of Germany in the Holy Roman Empire, since the author of the Narratio refers to these as "our kingdom" and "our empire".

The fleet entered the sea at Blexen at the mouth of the Weser on 22 April. One ship was left on a sandbank on 23 April, to rejoin the fleet later. The rest arrived at Lowestoft in England on 24 April. On 25 April, three ships ran aground on sandbanks while the fleet was trying to enter the port of Sandwich during a storm. No men were lost and the equipment was saved, but only one ship could be salvaged. Repairs took 23 days, from 26 April to 18 May.

After purchasing one replacement ship in London, the fleet left Sandwich on 19 May and sailed west along the coast of England to Winchelsea, Yarmouth (23 May) and Dartmouth (24 May). Some men of London which the Gesta regis Henrici secundi records as present at the fall of Silves may have joined the fleet at this time. The fleet sailed for Brittany on 25 May and were at sea six days before landing on Belle Île, where they spent eight days waiting for winds. Rounding Brittany, they put in for one day at La Rochelle (9 June). They then sailed across the Bay of Biscay to the Bay of Luanco by the castle of Gozón in the kingdom of León, where they arrived on 18 June.

On 19–20 June, the crusaders made a brief pilgrimage overland to Oviedo Cathedral. They sailed from Luanco on the morning of 22 June and arrived at the mouth of the Tambre, either in Muros or Noia, late on 23 June. Some went overland on a pilgrimage to Santiago de Compostela. A galley from Tui joined the fleet in Galicia, bringing its size back up to eleven ships, although not the same eleven it had started with. The augmented fleet set out on 1 July and arrived in Lisbon on 3 or 4 July.

== Campaign (July–September) ==
=== Preparations and manoeuvres ===
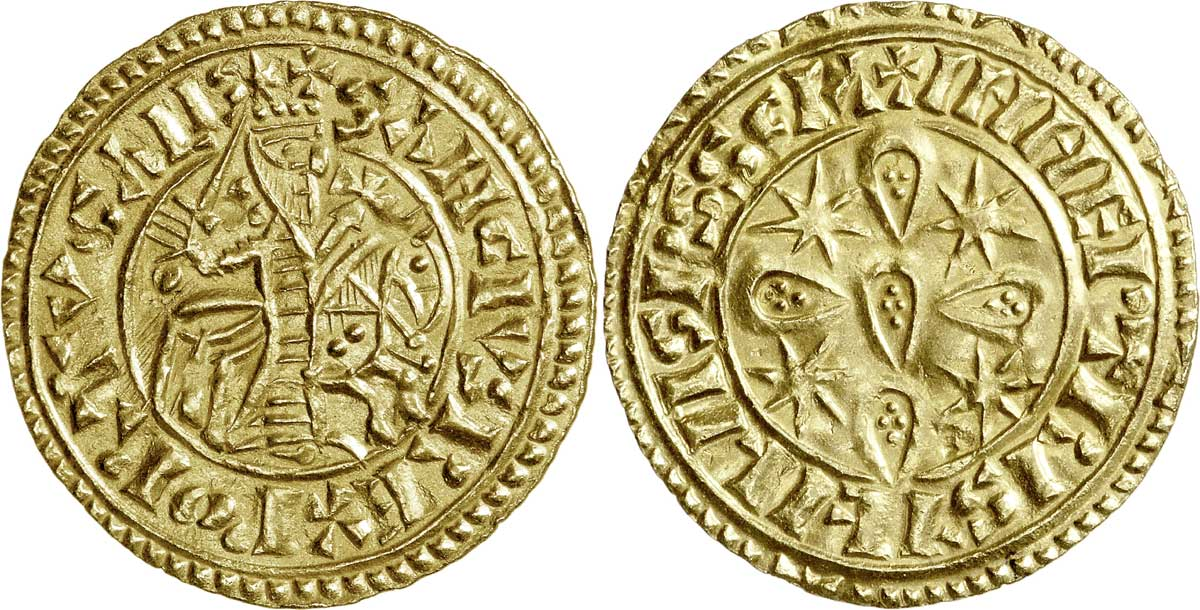
A gold maravedí of Sancho I, depicting on the obverse the king as a knight on horseback, sword raised

At Lisbon, the crusaders learned of the sack of Alvor and were invited to take part in an attack on Silves. Depending on the reading of the Narratio, Sancho made this request either while he was preparing his expedition or else after he had begun his march. According to the agreement as presented in Ralph of Diceto, the king agreed to let the crusaders keep any booty they took if they recognized his right to the city.

There were at that time either 24 or 44 other ships in the harbour of Lisbon. Some of these may have been a part of the fleet of 37 English crusader ships that, according to Ralph, left Dartmouth on 18 May and arrived in Lisbon on 29 June. According to the Narratio, the crusader fleet—which now numbered 36 "great ships" (cogs) and the one Galician galley—remained at Lisbon for eleven days. The Crónica de 1419 says that the crusaders were accompanied by 36 priests, which tallies well with the claim in De expugnatione Lyxbonensi that the 1147 fleet that conquered Lisbon carried one priest per ship.

On the evening of 14 July, the fleet sailed from Lisbon for Silves. According to Ralph, Sancho contributed a fleet of 37 galleys plus a large number of pinnaces. Ralph and the Narratio put the strength of the crusader army at 3,500 men, which is generally accepted as accurate. Those that sailed from Blexen seem mostly to have been commoners. In the entire Narratio, the only nobleman mentioned among the crusaders was a Galician knight who had come aboard as a pilot.

The fleets entered the estuary of the Arade on 17 July and dropped anchor. According to the Narratio, the land was empty because its inhabitants had fled for refuge to the city. Raiding parties were sent out to plunder and burn the nearby villages. Two men from Bremen got separated and were ambushed by a force of ten Almohad cavalry. A pinnace was sent upriver and via the Odelouca to establish contact with the Portuguese camp about 16 miles (26 km) away. Sancho had delegated command to a lieutenant, who is unnamed in the Narratio. According to al-Marrākushī, he was Pedro Henriques, but there is some doubt about the accuracy of al-Marrākushī on this point. On 18 July, the crusaders were joined by a ship from Brittany. The same day, the Portuguese commander came to the anchorage to discuss the attack. According to the Narratio, he proposed attacking a place called Dardea instead of Silves, but the crusaders refused. (If Dardea is an error for Gardea, it may be equated with Cartaya.)

On 19 July, the crusaders sailed up the Arade as far as they could while the Portuguese marched to a position just ahead of them. On 20 July, they approached the city on skiffs and, according to the Narratio, "pitched camp so that it was well within double bowshot of the wall." They were probably on the western side of the city. A cavalry troop galloped out to provoke a response and, against orders, some crusaders charged them. They were attacked from the walls and retreated after suffering casualties. The camp was moved closer to the walls of the suburb and the crusaders spent the day preparing ladders for an assault the following morning.

=== Siege ===
==== Initial assaults and fall of the lower town ====
The siege began with an assault on the walls of the lower town on 21 July. The Portuguese and crusaders attacked from different directions. After putting up weak resistance with stones and darts, the defenders retreated to the city, leaving the lower town in the hands of the attackers. According to the Narratio, the governor ordered the soldiers who had initiated the retreat beheaded.

On 22 July, leaving the captured town to be held by the galley crews, the army launched an assault with ladders against the city but was repulsed. The Narratio describes heavy missile fire by both sides. That evening the crusaders' camp was moved a second time, right up to the walls of the captured town. Work on siege engines was begun. According to the Crónica de 1419, King Sancho arrived on 22 July. The Narratio, however, puts his arrival on 29 July, with reinforcements and baggage coming behind him. The journey from Lisbon took seven days, according to the Narratio. The royal army was said to include "a large number of cavalry, infantry and galley crewmen, and also … religious knights of three types", namely, the Templars, the Hospitallers and the Order of Avis. They arrived on 30 July and the city was surrounded on all sides. The crusader army of 3,500 was insufficient to completely invest the city.

While they were working on the engines, the crusaders were, in the words of the Narratio, "shooting and being shot at by arrows or with machines". The assault with engines began on 6 August, when the Germans pushed a battering ram up to the wall between two towers. The defenders managed to set it on fire and destroy it. In response to this setback, the Flemish proposed to withdraw. The Flemish had not been part of the fleet that left Blexen, but were among those who had arrived in Lisbon earlier. On 7 August, a German siege engine began shooting at the two towers, while Sancho's two engines began bombarding the people inside the city.

==== Capture of the breastwork ====
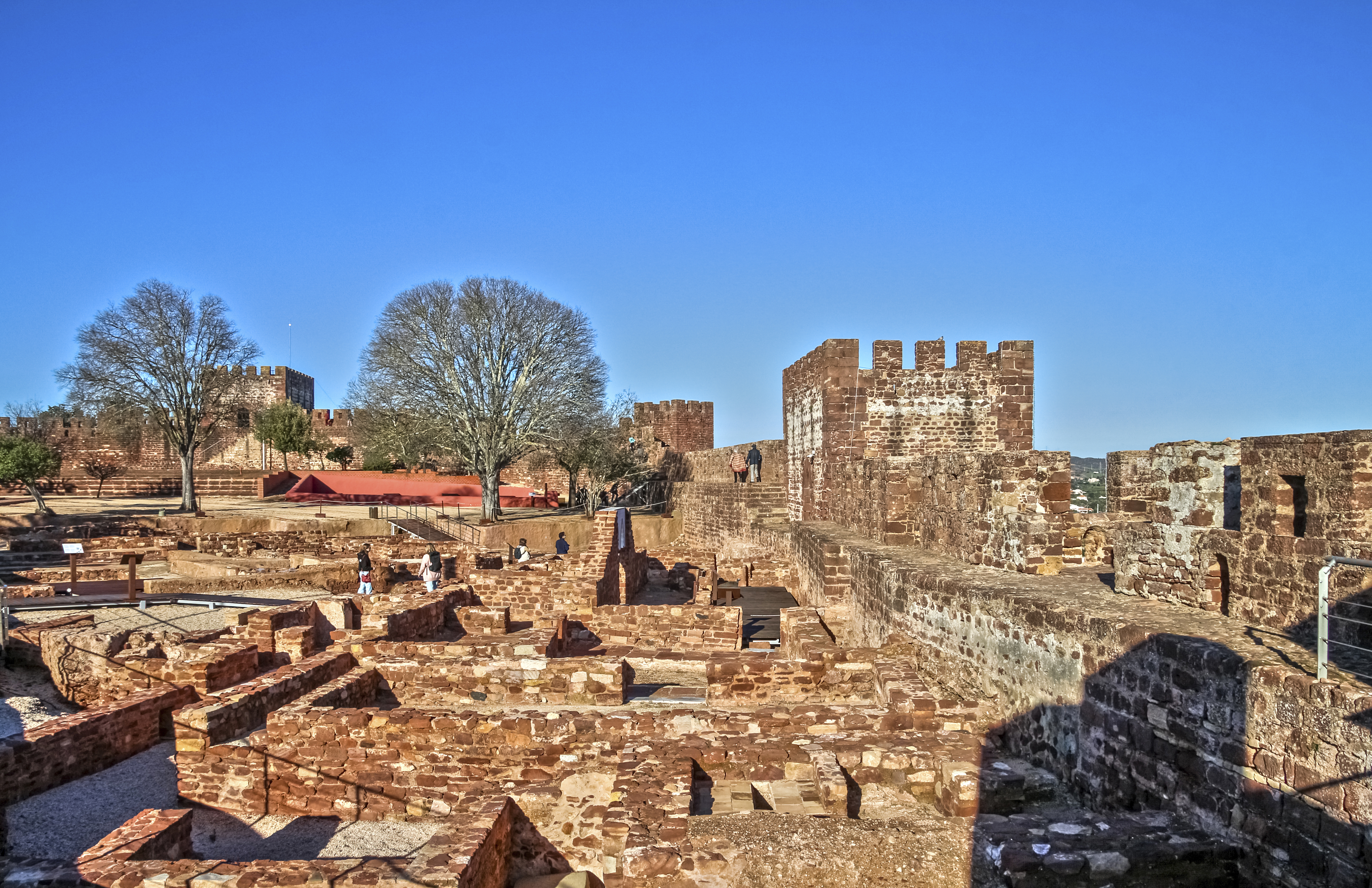
Ruins of the fortifications of Silves today

On 8 August, a Moorish or black Muslim defector arrived in Sancho's camp with two pennons. There are several interpretations of this incident as recorded in the Narratio. The defector may have promised the handover of the city as soon as the breastwork was captured; or perhaps merely emboldened the crusaders to boast that they would soon take the breastwork; or even advised them to concentrate on the breastwork as the weak point in the defence. After the defection, the besiegers began to concentrate on the breastwork.

On 9 August, the crusaders began undermining the walls of the breastwork, but withdrew at night believing that the defenders were countermining them. The following morning they lit the beams supporting the tunnel and part of the tower came down. Further mining brought more of it down and the attackers managed to enter via ladders while the defenders retreated along the walls to the upper fortress. The wall was then demolished in two places by the crusaders and the well the city used for water filled in.

==== Assault on the upper city ====
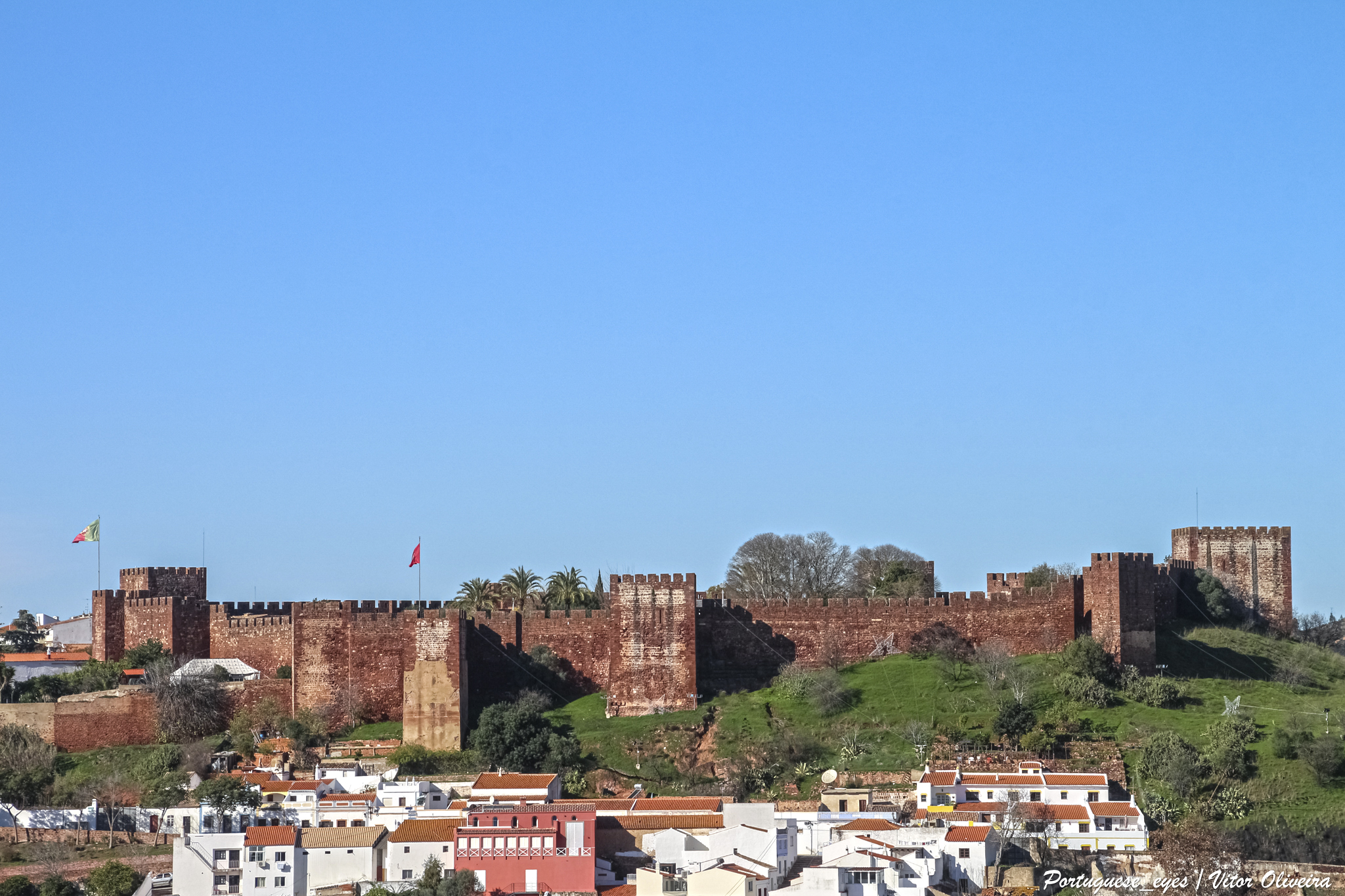
The high citadel of Silves.

On 11 August, the crusaders began mining the walls of the city, but the following day the defenders sortied and burned the tunneling works. The Flemish attempted to mine through the wall of the lower town to where it joined with a tower of the upper city, but the defenders demolished the section of wall connected to the tower on 13 August. the Narratio notes that at this juncture the defenders were suffering from thirst and there was an increase in desertions:

… many people now fled to us at various times from the fortress, in order to save their lives; and to encourage others to leave too we did not harm them in any way. On [14 August], the Saracens attacked us and our men in that sector were drawn up ready for battle when one of the Saracens jumped off the wall and fled to our men. He was extremely thirsty and begged for water … He told us that a great many of the enemy were dying of thirst, for they had only a little water in their wells up there …

A full-scale assault was launched on 18 August with scaling ladders, but it was repulsed. An attempt to fill in the ditch was also repulsed. According to the Narratio, the Portuguese army wished to withdraw after these failures, but the crusaders refused and King Sancho sided with them. The attackers then concentrated on the north wall with their siege engines, four supplied by the crusaders and three by the Portuguese. These were opposed by four engines inside the city. A new tunnel was begun at a distance from the wall to avoid early detection, but the defenders noticed it and sortied twice, being beaten back a second time on 22 August.

On 23 August, there was a dispute between the crusaders and the Portuguese, with the king this time proposing to withdraw. He ultimately agreed to remain for another four days. During this time, a new tunnel was begun. The defenders countermined and a battle was fought underground. According to the Narratio, the attackers were driven back "with a copious fiery flood" (igneo copioso fluvio), possibly indicating Greek fire. The defenders also dug a trench along the inside of the wall to be ready to meet the attackers if they tunneled under the wall. According to the Narratio, however, the purpose of the tunnel was to undermine the wall. Work on the tunnel—and underground fighting—continued until the surrender and at least one of the towers was completely ruined.

=== Negotiations and surrender ===
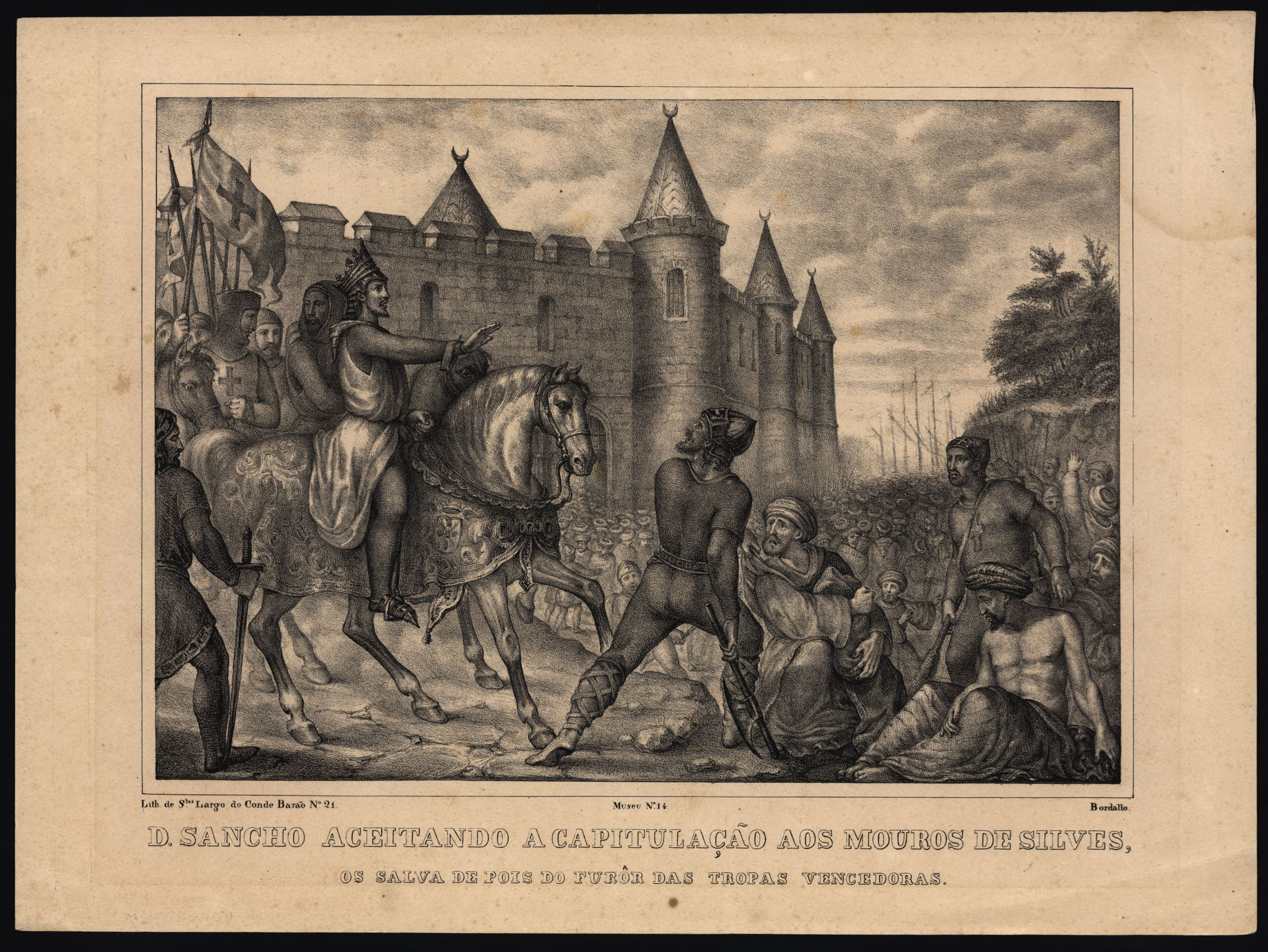
19th-century depiction of the capitulation of Silves

On 1 September, the Portuguese offered the defenders the chance to surrender and negotiations began. According to the Narratio, there were many desertions from inside the city at this stage. The defenders agreed to surrender on the condition that they keep their movable property and be permitted to depart. Sancho offered the crusaders 10,000 gold coins to relinquish their right to plunder, which they refused. They accepted 20,000 gold coins, but when it became apparent that it would take some time for the king to gather such a large sum, they withdrew their consent. They consented only that the defenders be permitted to leave unmolested with the clothes they were wearing. Ibn Abī Ḥafṣ accepted these terms on 2 September.

On 3 September, the city was handed over. This date is found in the Narratio, the Chronicon Conimbricense (which erroneously places it in the year 1190) and Ibn ʿIdhārī (Rajab 20 in the Islamic calendar), indicating that Ralph of Diceto is in error in giving 6 September. The surrender was made to Sancho and not the crusaders. The governor rode out while the rest followed on foot. According to the author of the Narratio, some crusaders acted "in defiance of the treaty" by robbing the departing Muslims or even torturing some in the city into revealing their hidden wealth. He describes the defenders as weak and emaciated from lack of water. Of the 450 Christian prisoners in Silves at the start of the siege, there were only 200 or so alive at the end.

== Occupation and spoils ==
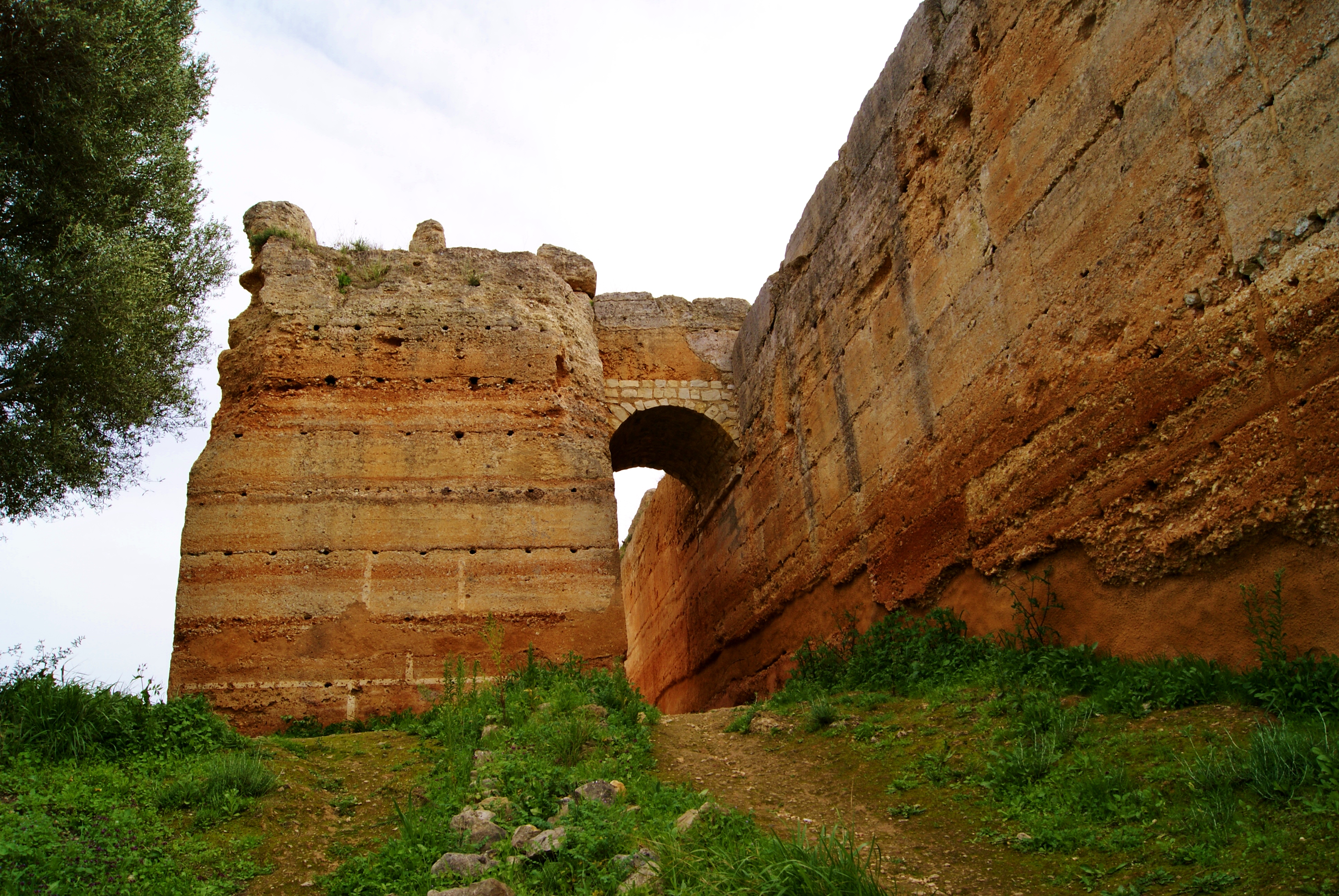
Albarrana tower of Paderne, which capitulated to Sancho with the fall of Silves

According to the Narratio, nine castles that had been governed from Silves came into Portuguese hands after the fall of the city: Lagos, Alvor, Portimão, Monchique, Santo Estêvão, Carvoeiro, São Bartolomeu de Messines, Paderne and Carphanabel. The last place is unidentified, but may be Cabo de São Vicente or Sagres. These were mostly deserted, as their inhabitants had fled to Silves. The governor of Albufeira surrendered to the Portuguese for fear of the crusaders.

Silves was initially occupied by the crusaders while the Portuguese army remained outside. This was to allow the crusaders to divide the booty. The original agreement with Sancho allocated all the booty to them, but they had agreed during the siege to give some to the king to be distributed to his army. Sancho laid claim to the city's grain stores. According to the Narratio, the division of the booty descended into commotion and, to avoid an escalation, the leaders of the crusade turned the city over to Sancho, requesting that he assign them a fair portion of what wealth remained in it, which he did not do.

According to the Narratio, Sancho had also promised to bestow a tenth of the conquered lands to the Church of the Holy Sepulchre in compensation for delaying the crusaders but afterwards reneged. He remained at Silves until 12 September, establishing a garrison and appointing his lieutenant as its alcaide or castellan. It is generally thought that this is the same unnamed person who was in command from the beginning of the siege. According to Portuguese historiography, this man was Count Mendo Gonçalves de Sousa, master of the household and most renowned peer of Portugal. Friedrich Kurth argued that the new castellan was in fact Álvaro Martins, who is known to have subsequently died at Silves in battle with the Muslims sometime before 27 July 1190. Whoever he was, the new castellan appointed the Fleming Nicholas as the new bishop of Silves. As a result, some Flemish crusaders chose to stay in Silves. According to Ralph of Diceto, Nicholas dedicated the mosque as a cathedral on 8 September. He also asked the departing crusaders to help the Portuguese besiege Faro, but they refused. The author of the Narratio believed that the entire Gharb—including the towns of Faro, Loulé, Cacela, Tavira, Mértola and Serpa—could have been taken if not for Sancho's ill feeling towards the crusaders and the "accursed haste of some of our men."

== Aftermath ==
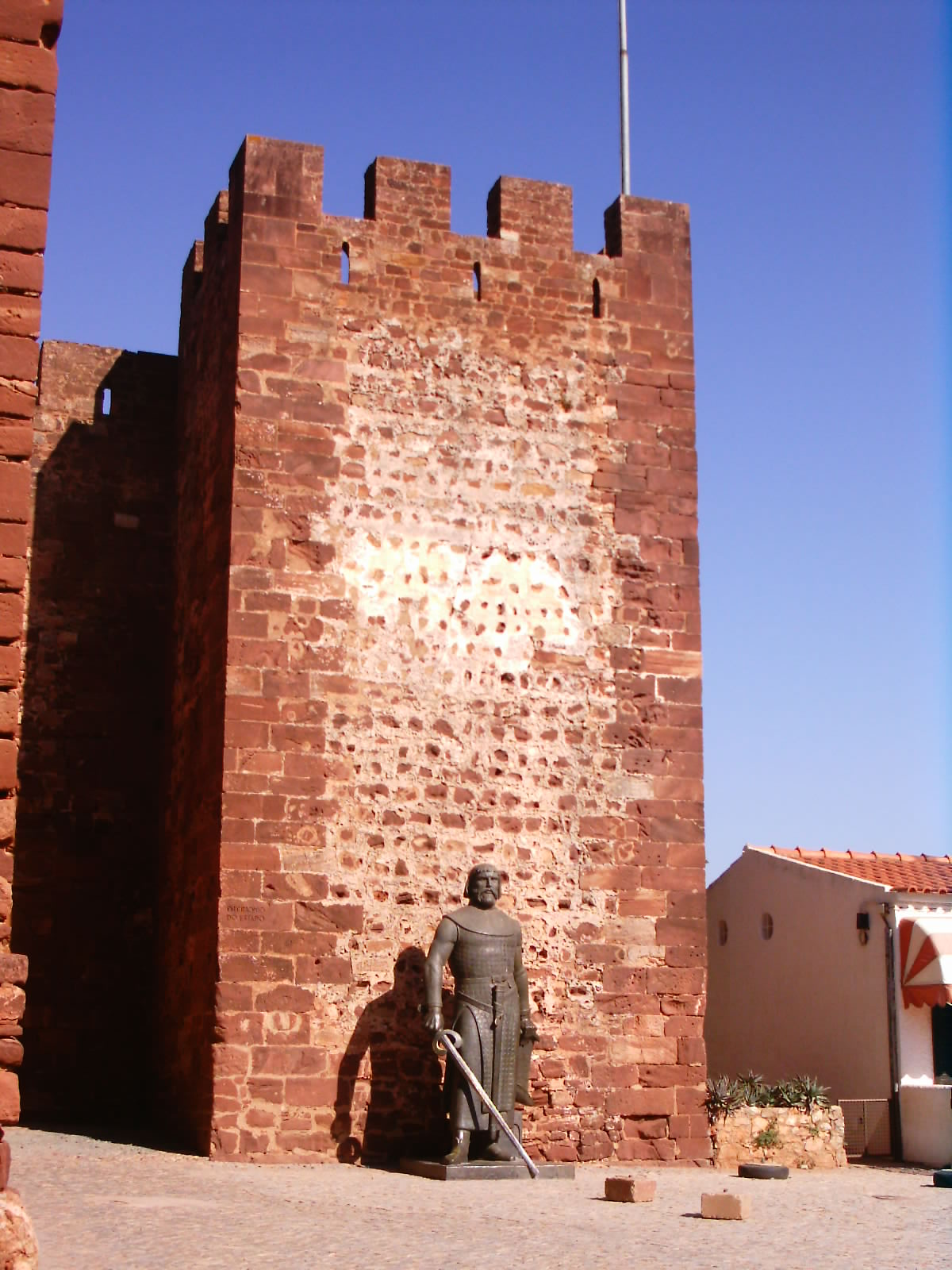
Tower on the high citadel wall and statue of king Sancho.

With Silves captured, Sancho left with his army about the middle of September, but on the way back he still recaptured the city of Beja. The southern border of Portugal thus ran from Silves to Beja and Évora along a southwest-northeast axis. By December the king was back in Coimbra.

=== Continuation of the crusade ===
The crusader fleet set sail on 7 September, but stopped to divide spoils and repair two ships. It did not enter the Atlantic until 20 September. They passed the island of Saltés, whose inhabitants fled to Huelva at their approach, and were forced by contrary winds to enter the port of Cádiz on 26 September. Refugees from Silves had warned the populace and most had fled. The governor, however, agreed to release twelve Christian prisoners and pay a tribute. When only four prisoners were handed over the next day, the crusaders rampaged, burning down houses, tearing down walls and uprooting vineyards and orchards.

The crusaders sailed from Cádiz on 28 September and landed at Tarifa on 29 September. While cavalry and infantry took up positions to defend the city, the crusaders entered their skiffs. The attack was called off, however, for a lack of unanimity. The crusaders then sailed through the Strait of Gibraltar on the night of 29–30 September. In the Mediterranean, the fleet followed the European coast. The Narratio ends with a notice of the fleet in Montpellier and Marseille. The fleet may have wintered in Marseille or perhaps in Sicily.

The Itinerarium peregrinorum may attest to the arrival of the fleet at Acre, although its account is somewhat confused and there are chronological problems with this interpretation. The fleet that arrived in September 1189 cannot be the one that attacked Silves and is probably the one that sacked Alvor. The fleet from Silves arrived at Acre between April and June 1190. Its arrival is implied by the presence of merchants and other commoners from Bremen and Lübeck who arrived on cogs. According to the Narratio de primordiis ordinis theutonici, they used wood and cloth from their sailing ships to make a field hospital, a foundation which ultimately evolved into the Teutonic Order. The head of the hospital at this stage was a priest named Sibrand.

=== Almohad response ===
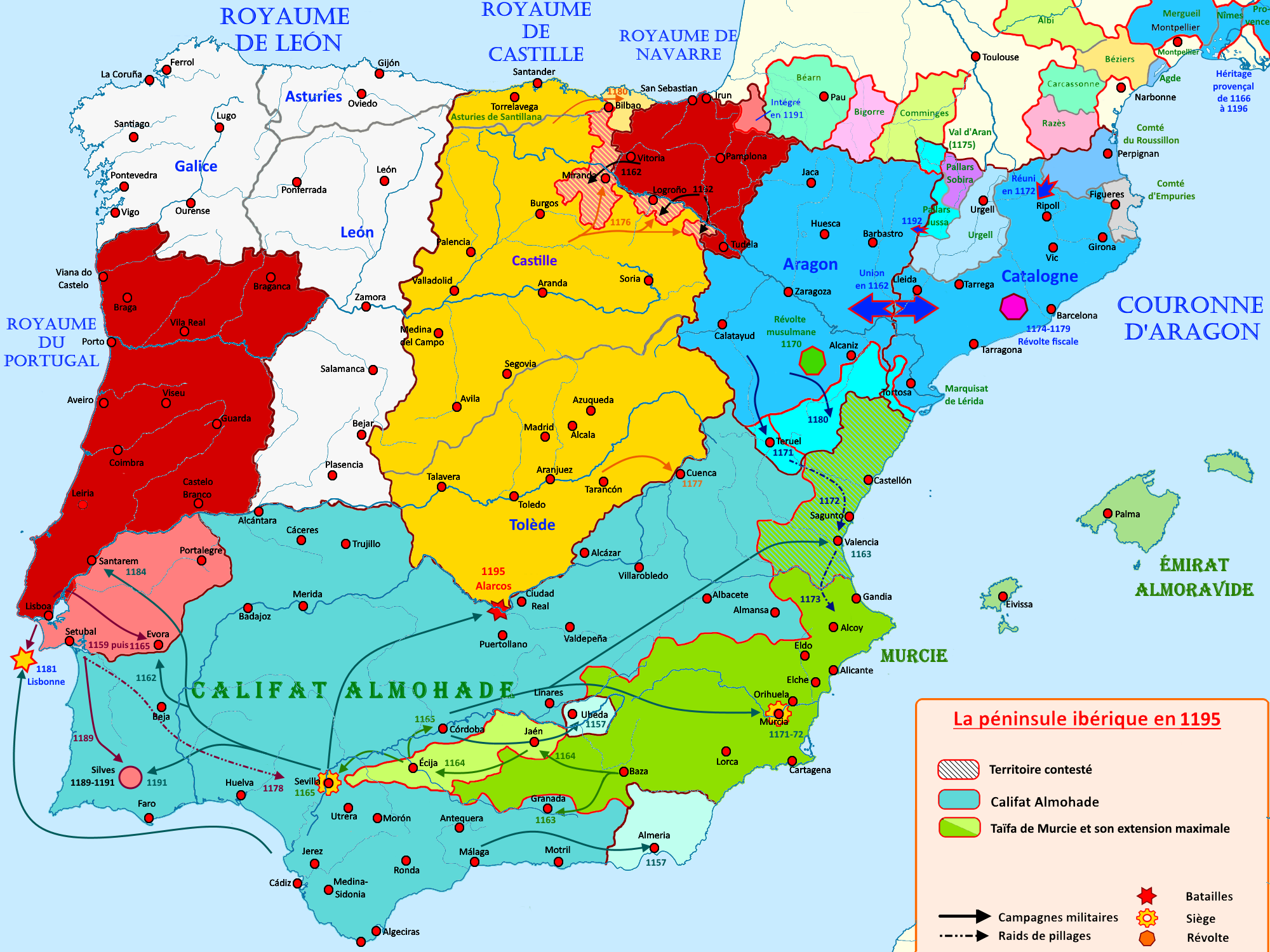
State of the Iberian peninsula in 1195, showing recent territorial changes and military activities

Even before the loss of Silves, the Almohads had been planning a campaign against Portugal. The Caliph Abū Yaʿqūb Yūsuf had died campaigning against Portugal at the siege of Santarém in 1184. Sancho, then heir apparent, had been among the defenders. Yūsuf's son and successor, Yaʿqūb al-Manṣūr, had to confront a rebellion in Africa at the start of his reign. According to Ibn ʿIdhārī, he had by 1188 begun planning to continue the holy war in Portugal. In the summer of 1189, before he was prepared to act, his territories around Córdoba and the Aljarafe were raided King Alfonso VIII of Castile. Several castles were captured and, according to the Anales toledanos, the Castilians even reached the sea.

In April 1190, al-Manṣūr finally launched his campaign against Portugal. In June, he signed a truce with Castile so as to be able to focus his energies against Portugal. His siege of Silves failed, but he wintered in Seville and launched a new invasion in April 1191. His second siege of Silves succeeded and the city surrendered in July with Sancho's permission. In 1197, another German crusade captured and plundered Silves, but did not hand it over to Sancho. It thus remained in Almohad hands until the 1240s, although its later Muslim history is obscure. It was captured by the Portuguese at an uncertain date, perhaps 1240, 1242 or 1249.

== See also ==
- Portugal in the Middle Ages
- Timeline of Portuguese history (First Dynasty)
- Almohad wars in the Iberian Peninsula

== Bibliography ==
- Bennett, Stephen (2021). Elite Participation in the Third Crusade. Boydell Press.
- Cushing, Dana, ed. (2013). A German Third Crusader's Chronicle of his Voyage and the Siege of Almohad Silves, 1189 AD / Muwahid Xelb, 585 AH: De Itinere Navali. Antimony Media.
- Cushing, Dana (2017). "The Siege of Silves in 1189". Medieval Warfare. 7 (5): 48–53. JSTOR 48578126.
- David, Charles Wendell (1939). "Narratio de Itinere Navali Peregrinorum Hierosolymam Tendentium et Silviam Capientium, A.D. 1189". Proceedings of the American Philosophical Society. 81 (5): 591–676. JSTOR 985010.
- Gibb, H. A. R. (1971) [1935]. "English Crusaders in Portugal". In Edgar Prestage (ed.). Chapters in Anglo-Portuguese Relations. Greenwood Press. pp. 9–16.
- Hosler, John (2018). The Siege of Acre, 1189–1191: Saladin, Richard the Lionheart, and the Battle that Decided the Third Crusade. Yale University Press.
- Lay, Stephen (2008). "Miracles, Martyrs and the Cult of Henry the Crusader in Lisbon". Portuguese Studies. 24: 7–31. doi:10.1353/port.2008.0023. S2CID 245841435.
- Lay, Stephen (2009). The Reconquest Kings of Portugal: Political and Cultural Reorientation on the Medieval Frontier. Palgrave Macmillan.
- Loud, Graham A., ed. (2010). The Crusade of Frederick Barbarossa: The History of the Expedition of the Emperor Frederick and Related Texts. Ashgate.
- Makki, Mahmoud (1994). "The Political History of al-Andalus (92/711–897/1492)". In Salma Khadra Jayyusi (ed.). The Legacy of Muslim Spain. Brill. pp. 3–87.
- Marín, Manuela (1997). "Shilb". In Bosworth, C. E.; van Donzel, E.; Heinrichs, W. P. & Lecomte, G. (eds.). The Encyclopaedia of Islam, Second Edition. Volume IX: San–Sze. Leiden: E. J. Brill. p. 441. ISBN 978-90-04-10422-8.
- Martos Quesada, Juan (2009). "La labor historiográfica de Ibn Iḏārī". Anaquel de Estudios Árabes. 20: 117–130.
- McMurdo, Edward (1888). The History of Portugal: From the Commencement of the Monarchy to the Reign of Alfonso III. Vol. 1. S. Low, Marston, Searle, & Rivington.
- Morton, Nicholas Edward (2009). The Teutonic Knights in the Holy Land, 1190–1291. The Boydell Press.
- Nicholson, Helen J., ed. (2019) [1997]. Chronicle of the Third Crusade: A Itinerarium Peregrinorum et Gesta Regis Ricardi. Routledge.
- Slaughter, John E. (1968). "The Conquest of Silves: A Contemporary Narrative" (PDF). The Journal of the American Portuguese Cultural Society. 2: 25–44.
- Wilson, Jonathan (2009). The Siege and Conquest of Silves, 1189: A Tale of the Third Crusade by Anonymous Crusader. Mesquita Press.
- Wilson, Jonathan (2020). "'Neither age nor sex sparing': The Alvor Massacre 1189, an Anomaly in the Portuguese Reconquista?". Journal of Medieval Iberian Studies. 12 (2): 1–31 [199–229]. doi:10.1080/17546559.2019.1704043. S2CID 214374323.
- Wilson, Jonathan (2021). The Conquest of Santarém and Goswin's Song of the Conquest of Alcácer do Sal: Editions and Translations of De expugnatione Scalabis and Gosuini de expugnatione Salaciae carmen. Crusade Texts in Translation. Routledge.
