= Siege of Silves =

Siege of Silves may refer to:

- Siege of Silves (1063)
- Siege of Silves (1189), part of the Third Crusade
- Siege of Silves (1190)
- Siege of Silves (1191)

== See also ==
- Raid on Silves (1197)
