= São Marcos da Serra =

- Civil parish
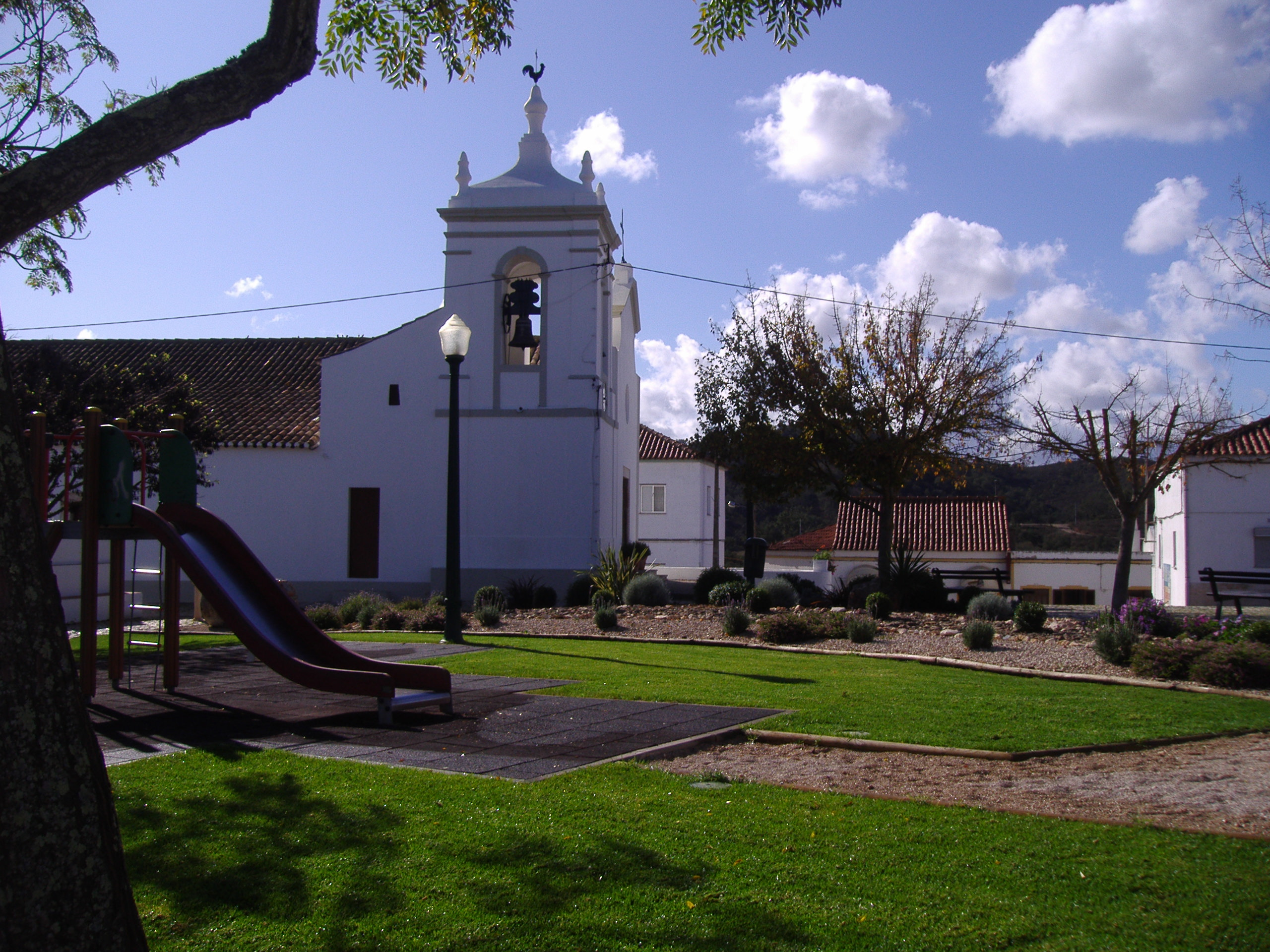
- The Parish Church of São Marcos da Serra.

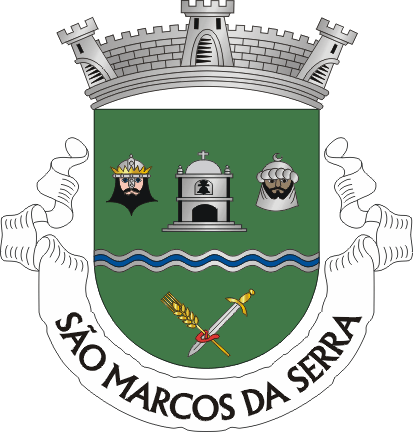
- Coat of arms

- Location in Portugal
- Coordinates: 37.362°N 8.378°W
- Country: Portugal
- Region: Algarve
- Intermunic. comm.: Algarve
- District: Faro
- Municipality: Silves

Area
  - Total: 166.07 km^{2} (64.12 sq mi)

Population (2011)
  - Total: 1,352
  - Density: 8.141/km^{2} (21.09/sq mi)
- Time zone: UTC+00:00 (WET)
  - Summer (DST): UTC+01:00 (WEST)
- Postal code: 8375
- Area code: 282
- Website: www.saomarcosdaserra.com

São Marcos da Serra, also known simply as São Marcos, is a village and the seat of the homonymous civil parish in the municipality of Silves, in Algarve region, Portugal. The population of the entire civil parish in 2011 was 1,352, in an area of 166.07 km^{2}.

The village gives its name to the São Marcos-Quarteira Fault, a geological fault with a length of more than 40 km, which extends from São Marcos da Serra in the direction of Paderne to the coast, in the Quarteira area, extending further to the submerged area, on the continental shelf.

== History ==
São Marcos takes its name from Saint Mark, the Evangelist. São Marcos is Portuguese for Saint Mark and da Serra means "of the Mountain Range". The specific date of creation of the civil parish of São Marcos da Serra is not yet known, however, the oldest documentary reference to this parish dates back to 1598 in the information that Fernando Martins Mascarenhas, Bishop of Faro sent to Pope Clement VIII on the state of his bishopric. It was certainly in the first half of the 16th century, during the reign of king Manuel I of Portugal (1495-1521) that the parish of São Marcos arose, given that it was this monarch who undertook the entire reorganization of the administration of the territory and conferred the new charters on the Portuguese cities and towns. Integrated in this policy was the creation of new parishes, including São Marcos da Serra. The liberal revolution of 1820 put an end to the rigid absolutist system that was established until then and promoted the ideals of freedom and independence promoted by liberalism: civil equality, religious equality and property rights. These liberal ideals were strongly opposed by the toughest guerrilla leaders that the antiliberal Miguelist supporters organized throughout the country.

Engraving of Remexido, from ca. 1836, made by R. Vidal (fl. ca. 1836?).

In Algarve region, José Joaquim de Sousa Reis, also known as the Remexido, a civil servant from São Bartolomeu de Messines who defended the rights of king Miguel to the Portuguese throne and the old absolutist rule, became one of the most famous guerrilla leaders in the country during and after the Liberal Wars (1828–1834). In 1833, after the landing of liberal troops in the Algarve, he was ordered to occupy São Marcos da Serra for being a strategic location for the interception of communications and supplies sent to the liberals. In the period between 1833 and 1838, Remexido withdrew, after successive incursions on the Algarve coast, to São Marcos da Serra, transforming this location, alongside Santana da Serra in the neighboring municipality of Ourique, into the headquarters of the antiliberal guerrilla. After the defeat of Miguel in 1834, Remexido found himself savagely persecuted, and took refuge in the mountains of the Algarve. On the outskirts of São Marcos da Serra is the so-called Cabana do Remexido (Remexido's Hut), where it is said that the famous antiliberal Miguelist, commander of legitimist guerrillas who spread fear and violence throughout the region, was captured.

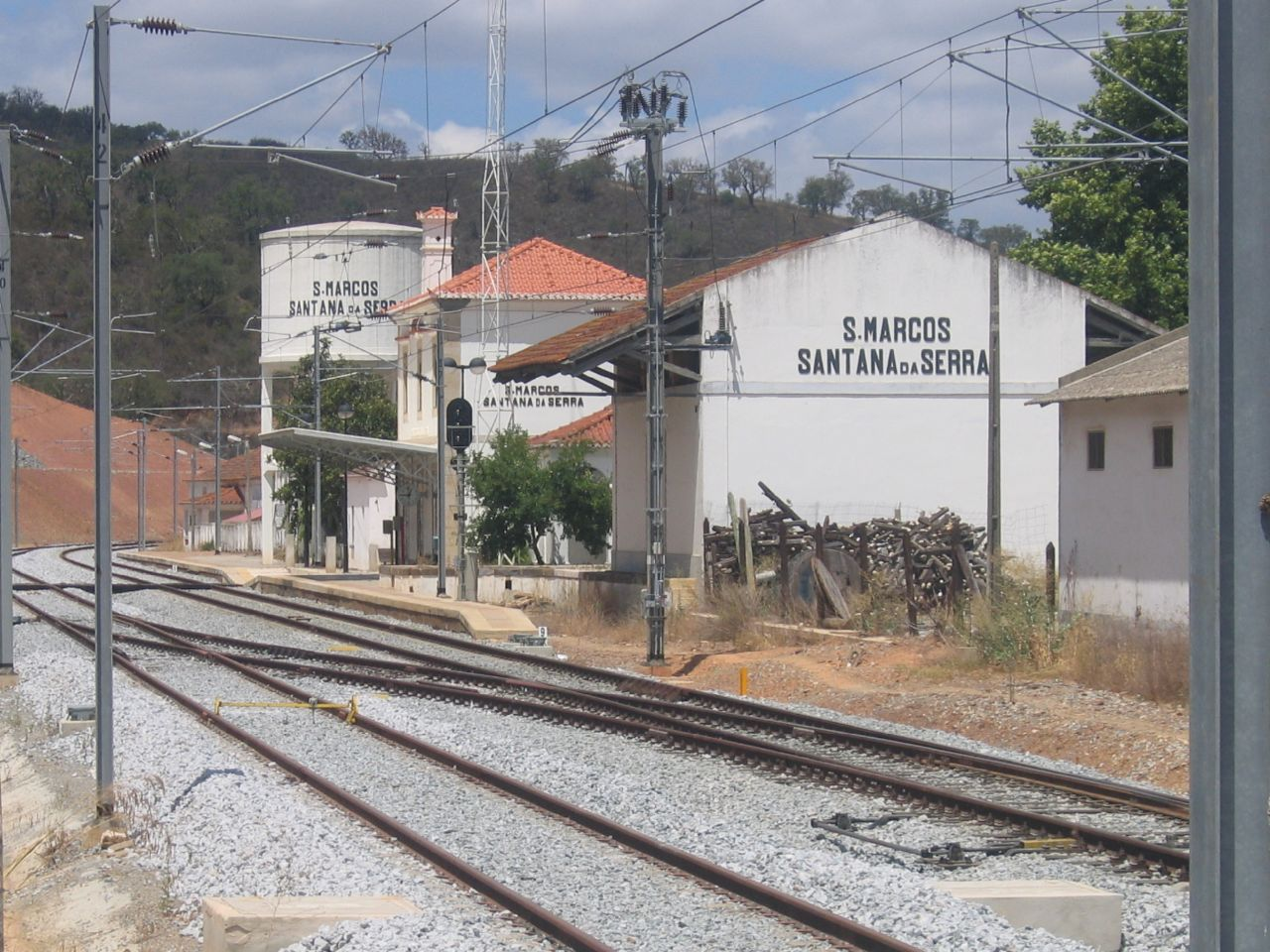
The São Marcos da Serra railway station, now abandoned after the discontinuation of service at the beginning of the 21st century.

The victory of the liberal revolution made São Marcos da Serra benefit from all the changes, namely with the arrival of the railroad that brought with it the development of this modest village, resulting in the emergence of an industry (gristmills), complementary equipment (inn), and a new cemetery. From the middle of the 19th century to the beginning of the 20th century, the population increase forced the construction of new neighborhoods, new streets and blocks. The 1950 Portuguese census marks the highest number of inhabitants São Marcos da Serra ever had until then, with a record-high 4,179 population assessed at the time. The construction of a new two-room primary school in the mid-twentieth century reflects a population that was already stabilized, but that would soon feel the weight of people's flight to both coastal cities and as emigrants abroad. Already experiencing a continuously declining population, with the events of the Carnation Revolution in 1974 when a large number of destitute refugees from the collapsed overseas Portuguese Empire arrived to Portugal, the village's population unexpectedly grew more than 40% in a short time between the 1970s and the early 1980s but in the following years it appeared to resume its decline. Since 1999, putative apparitions of the Virgin Mary as Our Lady Mother of Goodness (Nossa Senhora da Bondade) were reported near São Marcos da Serra, resulting in some worldwide notoriety, in particular by the Catholic youth and priests. Although these allegedly paranormal events resulted in pilgrimages by some faithful to northern Algarve, the Holy See has never officially recognized these so-called Marian apparitions. Throughout the 2000s, São Marcos da Serra populational decline continued and the village cemented its status as a satellite village of the larger and better developed town of São Bartolomeu de Messines. In 2011, the same year that according to the 2011 census the population reached a record low number of 1,352 inhabitants as measured since the 1864 census, the São Marcos da Serra railway station was closed, increasing further its dependence on the neighboring town of São Bartolomeu de Messines. However, rural tourism-focused facilities and events have been developed in São Marcos da Serra since the 2010s in order to take advantage of the newly built Odelouca Dam with a catchment area of 393 km^{2} and the area's pristine, sparsely populated natural landscape nested between two mountain ranges of inland, western Algarve.

== Geography ==
The parish seat of São Marcos is 27.2 kilometres (16.9 mi) north-northeast of the centre of Silves, the seat of its municipality, 16 kilometers north of São Bartolomeu de Messines and is 250 kilometres (160 mi) south-southeast of Lisbon, the capital city of Portugal. Located between the junction between the Serra do Caldeirão and the Serra de Monchique mountain ridges, the parish is intersected by the Ribeira de Odelouca, which bisects the main village, also known as the Ribeira de São Marcos. The Odelouca receives water from two tributary streams: the Ribeira de Azilheire and Ribeira de Besteiros. A typical mountain community, the buildings are spread over the slopes of the mountain valleys, resulting in steep roadways. At the highest point of the village is the parish church, located in the main square, whose western extent is also used as a market. A landscaped space, the square is bordered by the church, across from the health center, while a statue of António Bernardino Ramos, a celebrated physician and respected inhabitant of the village, is located at its centre. On the heights along the rail-line, are the urban developments of Poleirão and Montinhos, consisting of the typical whitewashed buildings, in addition to several cafés and a restaurant. The parish seat is located west of the IC1 roadway that links the Algarve to Lisbon, through Santana da Serra and Ourique. In addition, there is a direct link to Silves, while the municipal road 541 connects São Marcos to Alferce by way of Nave Redonda. Until 2011, rail service supported the bus services in the morning and afternoon between São Marcos da Serra and São Bartolomeu de Messines, but it was discontinued. The population of the entire civil parish in 2011 was 1,352, in an area of 166.07 km^{2}. Almost all the population lives in the village of São Marcos da Serra proper. The village proper stands about between 110 and 130 meters above mean sea level and is about 37 kilometers from the coast by road.

=== Population ===
Population of São Marcos da Serra civil parish

Year	Pop.	±%
1864	1,355	—
1878	1,683	+24.2%
1890	2,018	+19.9%
1900	2,116	+4.9%
1911	2,635	+24.5%

Year	Pop.	±%
1920	3,107	+17.9%
1930	3,211	+3.3%
1940	3,313	+3.2%
1950	4,179	+26.1%
1960	3,673	−12.1%

Year	Pop.	±%
1970	1,694	−53.9%
1981	2,435	+43.7%
1991	2,066	−15.2%
2001	1,535	−25.7%
2011	1,352	−11.9%

== Economy ==
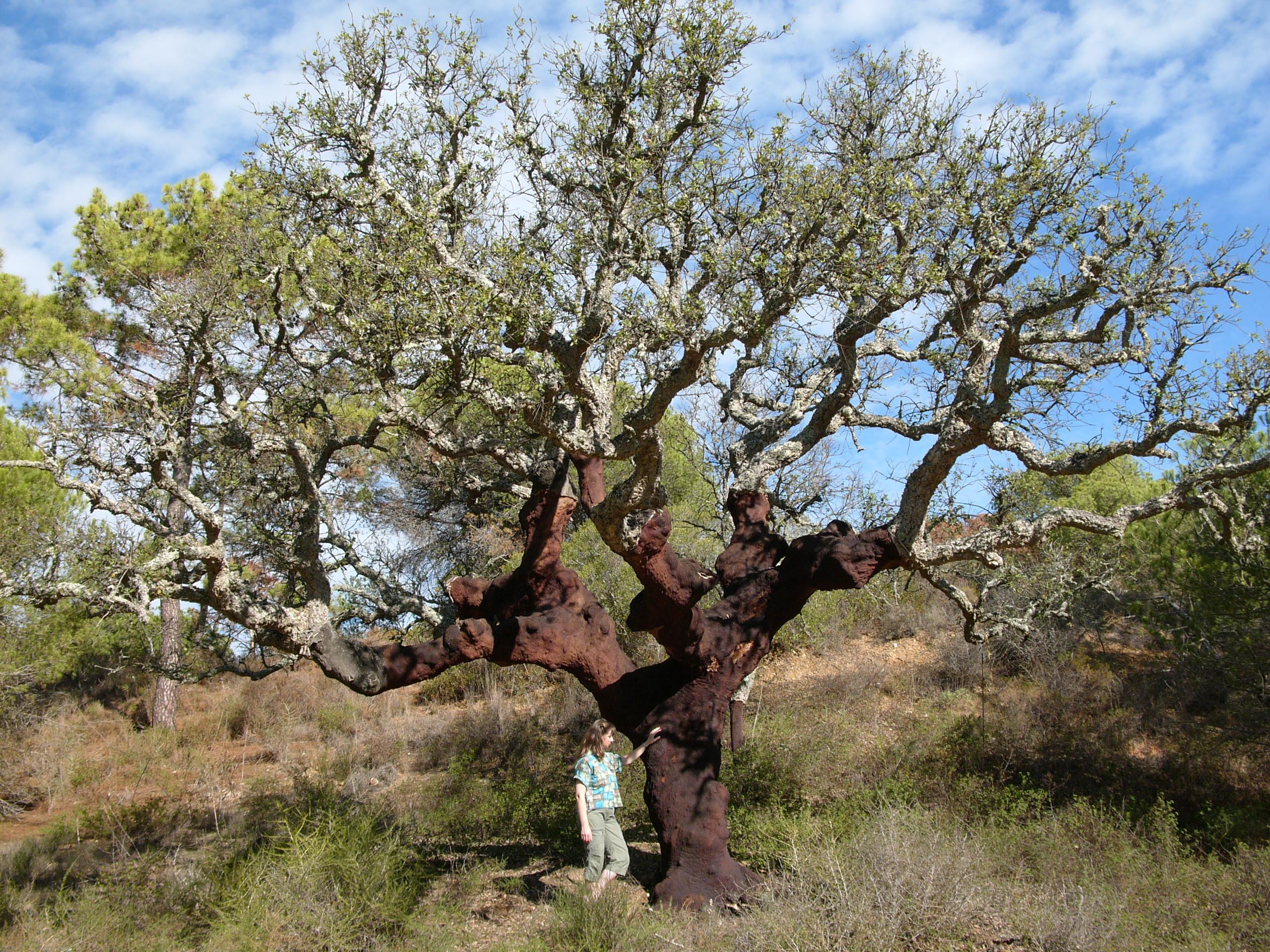
The Quercus suber, the common cork oak, is one of the primary sources of income in the region.

São Marcos da Serra is a main supplier of cork, as well as a producer of grain cereals, including wheat, barley and oats, at one time supported by several traditional windmills that dotted the civil parish landscape. Beekeeping is common in the hills surrounding the village, resulting in an itinerant economy in wax and honey collected from local beehives. While a subsistence supply of fruits and vegetables continue to be produced in the area, the cultivation of peaches (rare for this area) has been discontinued. The foothills of the parish are also favored by local hunters. Light industry is primarily involved in supporting agricultural extraction, but also include the production of the Arbutus brandy (medronho), Comel, a spirit distilled locally. São Marcos da Serra also supports a nascent music recording technology, known as Dynamic Convolution, developed by Sintefex Audio Lda., resulting in award-winning music recording products. Tourism, particularly focused on its rural version, has a growing importance for the local economy. An award-winning rural camping site is available in the civil parish near the Odelouca Dam catchment area. Although having a few grocery stores, cafés, restaurants and shops, as well as a local branch of the Portuguese bank Caixa de Crédito Agrícola which includes an on-site Multibanco automated teller machine, the village of São Marcos da Serra is a satellite village of the larger and better developed town of São Bartolomeu de Messines where an active train station is found as well as nationally renowned supermarket, bank and insurance branches and a wider diversity of other shops and services.

== Notable people ==
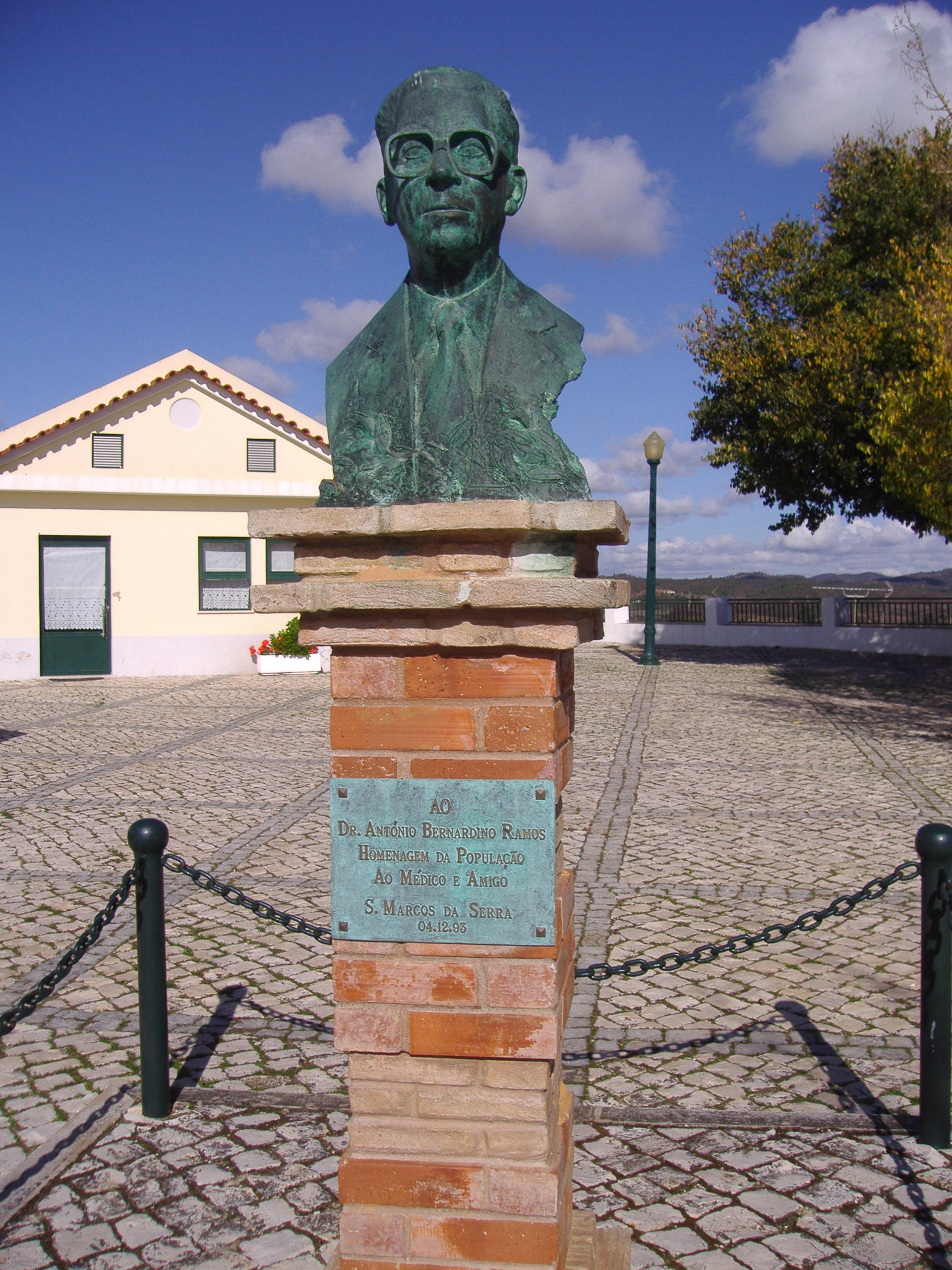
The bust of António Bernardino Ramos, celebrated physician and citizen, in the highest point of the village, in a square near the church.

- António Bernardino Ramos, was a medical practitioner and humanitarian, who lived and practiced in São Marcos da Serra. He was honored in 1993 with a statue which was erected before his death. He was well known by his generosity. He would walk to remote farms to help people in need and he would refuse any payment for his services when the patients were poor. Although he lived in the village of São Marcos da Serra, folks would come from distant places to see him. He was legendary in the whole region.
- Remexido (1796 – 1838), a civil servant and wealthy land tenant established in São Bartolomeu de Messines, who became a notorious guerrilla leader of the Algarve in Portugal, defending the rights of king Miguel to the Portuguese throne and the antiliberal absolute monarchy in the Kingdom of Portugal. He was captured by the victorious liberal forces while hiding himself near the village of São Marcos da Serra. The remains of his hut are still found in the same spot in São Marcos da Serra civil parish.
