= João de Deus de Nogueira Ramos =

Portuguese poet (1830–1896)

João de Deus Ramos
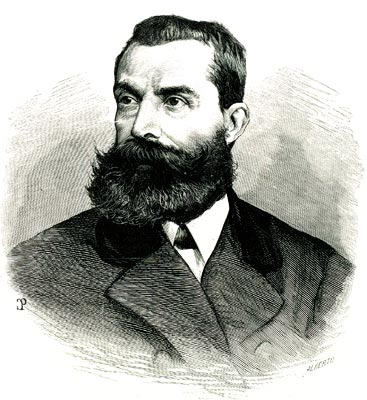
- João de Deus Ramos (from O Ocidente, 1878).
- Born: 8 March 1830; São Bartolomeu de Messines, Silves, Portugal
- Died: 11 January 1896 (aged 65); Lisbon, Portugal
- Occupation: Poet

João de Deus de Nogueira Ramos (8 March 1830 – 11 January 1896), better known as João de Deus, was a Portuguese poet, pedagogue and editor who turned his attention to Portuguese educational problems and wrote the famous didactic book Cartilha Maternal (1876), used to teach the Portuguese language across the country during the 19th and 20th centuries.

== Biography ==
He was born in São Bartolomeu de Messines, Silves, in the Portuguese province of Algarve, son of Pedro José Ramos (son of José dos Ramos and wife Joaquina Maria) and wife Isabel Gertrudes Martins (daughter of Manuel Martins and wife Gertrudes Angélica). Matriculating in the faculty of law at the University of Coimbra, he did not proceed to his degree but settled in the city, dedicating himself wholly to the composition of verses, which circulated among professors and undergraduates in manuscript copies.

In the volume of his art, as in the conduct of life, he practised a rigorous self-control. He printed nothing previous to 1855, and the first of his poems to appear in a separate form was A Lata, in 1860. In 1862 he left Coimbra for Beja, where he was appointed editor of O Bejense, the chief newspaper in the province of Alentejo, and four years later he edited the Folha do Sul. As the pungent satirical verses entitled Eleições prove, he was not an ardent politician, and, though he was returned as deputy for the constituency of Silves on 5 April 1868, he acted independently of all political parties and when general elections were called the following year, he did not seek renewal of his mandate. The renunciation implied in the act, which cut him off from all advancement, is in accord with nearly all that is known of his lofty character.

In the year of his election as deputy, his friend José António Garcia Blanco collected from local journals the series of poems, Flores do campo, which is supplemented by the Ramo de flores (1869). This is João de Deus' masterpiece.

Pires de Marmelada (1869) is an improvisation of no great merit. The four theatrical pieces -- Amemos o nosso próximo, Ser apresentado, Ensaio de Casamento, and A viúva inconsolável—are prose translations from Méry, cleverly done, but not worth the doing. Horácio e Lydia (1872), a translation from Pierre de Ronsard, is a good example of artifice in manipulating that monotonous measure, the Portuguese couplet.

He married Guilhermina das Mercês Battaglia, born in Lisbon on 12 July 1849, daughter of António Battaglia, of Italian descent, and wife Maria Madalena Soares, and had two sons: José do Espírito Santo Battaglia Ramos (Lisbon, 4 April 1875 – Lisbon, 20 April 1943), who was created 1st Viscount of São Bartolomeu de Messines, who married a Spaniard, María del Carmen Gómez y Sánchez (Lisbon, 18 February 1882 – Lisbon, October 1919) and had issue; and João de Deus Ramos, who married Carmen Syder, of paternal English descent, and had female issue.

As an indication of a strong spiritual reaction three prose fragments (1873) Anna, Mãe de Maria, A Virgem Maria and A Mulher do Levita de Ephraim translated from Darboy's Femmes de la Bible, are full of significance. The Folhas soltas (1876) is a collection of verse in the manner of Flores do campo, brilliantly effective and exquisitely refined.

Within the next few years the writer turned his attention to educational problems, and in his Cartilha maternal (1876) first expressed the conclusions to which his study of Pestalozzi and Fröbel had led him. This patriotic, pedagogical apostolate was a misfortune for Portuguese literature; his educational mission absorbed João de Deus completely, and is responsible for numerous controversial letters, for a translation of Theodore-Henri Barraus' treatise, Des devoirs des enfants envers leurs parents, for a prosodic dictionary, and for many other publications of no literary value. A copy of verses in António Vieira's Grinalda de Maria (1877), the Loas da Virgem (1878) and the Provérbios de Salomão are evidence of a complete return to orthodoxy during the poet's last years. By a lamentable error of judgment, some worthless pornographic verses entitled Cryptinas were inserted in the completest edition of João de Deus' poems — Campo de Flores (Lisbon, 1893).

He died in Lisbon on 11 January 1896, was accorded a public funeral and was buried in the National Pantheon, the Jeronymite church at Belém, where repose the remains of Camões. His remains were later moved to the Church of Santa Engrácia, the new National Pantheon. His scattered minor prose writings and correspondence have been posthumously published by Teófilo Braga (Lisbon, 1898).

== Poetry ==
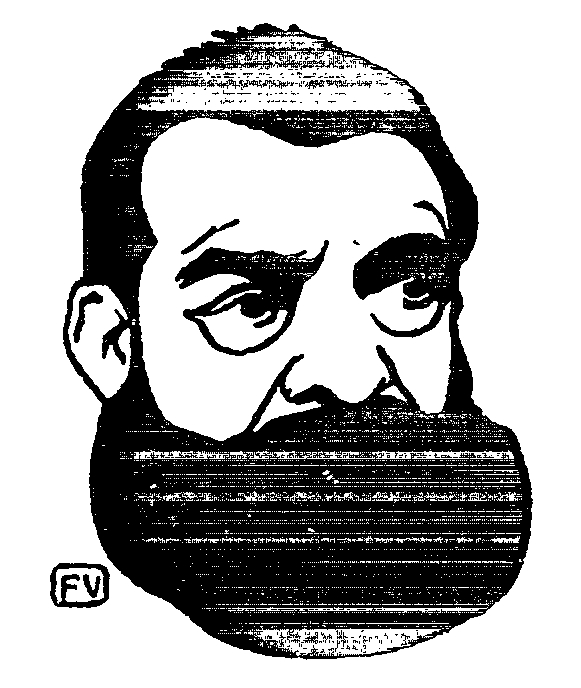
Portrait by Félix Vallotton

Next to Camões and perhaps Almeida Garrett, no Portuguese poet has been more widely read, more profoundly admired than João de Deus; yet no poet in any country has been more indifferent to public opinion and more deliberately careless of personal fame. He is not responsible for any single edition of his poems, which were put together by pious but ill-informed enthusiasts, who ascribed to him verses that he had not written; he kept no copies of his compositions, seldom troubled to write them himself, and was content for the most part to dictate them to others. He has no great intellectual force, no philosophic doctrine, is limited in theme as in outlook, is curiously uncertain in his touch, often marring a fine poem with a slovenly rhyme or with a misplaced accent; and, on the only occasion when he was induced to revise a set of proofs, his alterations were nearly all for the worse. And yet, though he never appealed to the patriotic spirit, though he wrote nothing at all comparable in force or majesty to the restrained splendour of Os Lusíadas, the popular instinct which links his name with that of his great predecessor is eminently just. For Camões was his model; not the Camões of the epic, but the Camões of the lyrics and the sonnets, where the passion of tenderness finds its supreme utterance.

Teófilo Braga has noted five stages of development in João de Deus' artistic life: the imitative, the idyllic, the lyric, the pessimistic and the devout phases. Under each of these divisions is included much that is of extreme interest, especially to contemporaries who have passed through the same succession of emotional experience, and it is highly probable that Caturras and Gaspar, pieces as witty as anything in Bocage but free from Bocage's coarse impiety, will always interest literary students. But it is as the singer of love that João de Deus will delight posterity as he delighted his own generation. The elegiac music of Rachel and of Marina, the melancholy of Adeus and of Remoinho, the tender and sincerity of Meu casto lírio, of Lágrima celeste, of Descale and a score more songs are distinguished by the large, vital simplicity which withstands time. It is precisely in the quality of unstudied simplicity that João de Deus is incomparably strong. The temptations to a display of virtuosity are almost irresistible for a Portuguese poet; he has the tradition of virtuosity in his blood, he has before him the example of all contemporaries, and he has at hand an instrument of wonderful sonority and compass. Yet not once is João de Deus clamorous or rhetorical, not once does he indulge in idle ornament. His prevailing note is that of exquisite sweetness and of reverent purity; yet with all his caressing softness he is never sentimental, and, though he has not the strength for a long fight, emotion has seldom been set to more delicate music. Had he included among his other gifts the gift of selection, had he continued the poetic discipline of his youth instead of dedicating his powers to a task which, well as he performed it, might have been done no less well by a much lesser man, there is scarcely any height to which he might not have risen.
