= Remexido =

Portuguese guerilla leader

José Joaquim de Sousa Reis
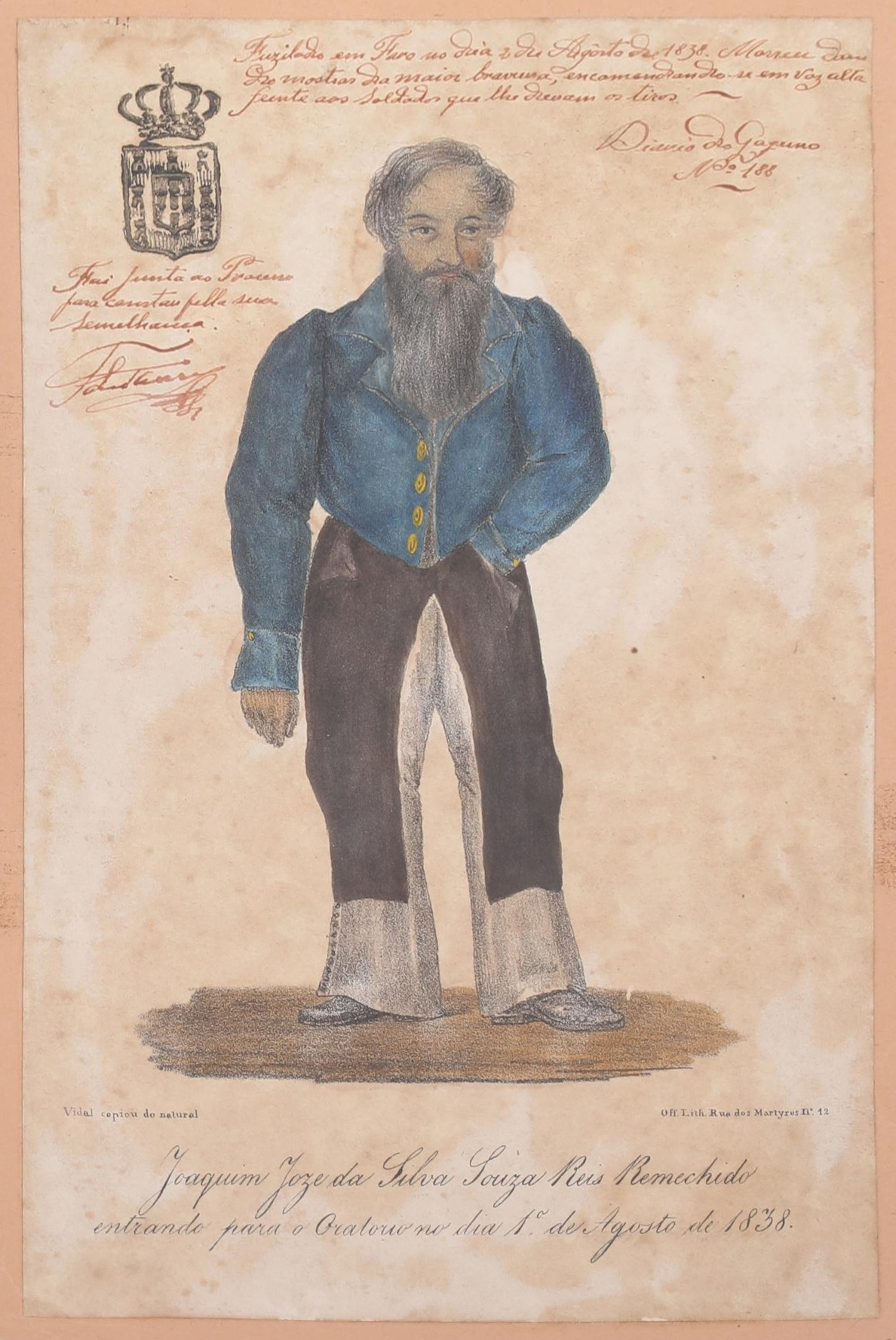
- Remexido in an engraving c. 1838
- Born: 19 October 1796; Estômbar, Kingdom of the Algarve
- Died: 2 August 1838 (aged 41); Faro, Kingdom of the Algarve
- Other names: Remechido
- Known for: Miguelista guerrilla leader

Remexido, (Note: Alternatively rendered as Remechido, as it was usually spelt before the spelling reforms of the 20th century.) the nickname of José Joaquim de Sousa Reis (19 October 1796 – 2 August 1838), was a civil servant and wealthy heir and land tenant who became a notorious guerrilla leader of the Algarve in Portugal, defending the rights of King Miguel to the Portuguese throne and the antiliberal absolute monarchy in the Kingdom of Portugal. He was accused of several crimes, which made him famous and feared by then, although some studies suggest Remexido did not commit them at all or in part. He was the son of Joaquim José dos Reis and wife Clara Maria do Carmo da Rocha, both born in Estômbar, in the municipality of Lagoa, and died before a firing squad at the Campo da Trindade (site of the present school hall of the Tomás Cabreira Secondary School) in Faro on 2 August 1838.

He served as a supporter of the absolutist status quo personified by Miguel of Portugal under General Tomás Cabreira at the Battle of Sant'Ana, during the Liberal Wars (1828–1834). After the defeat of absolutist forces and the victory of liberalism in Portugal in 1834, Remechido didn't surrender and found himself savagely persecuted. He took refuge in the mountains of the Algarve supported by some mountain people in and around São Marcos da Serra, in Silves Municipality. Resorting to guerrilla tactics, he systematically thrashed the government forces. To discover his whereabouts, the government forces publicly interrogated his wife with physical punishments and when she would not betray him, killed his 14-year-old son, two actions which made him resolve never to surrender and to punish those who had wronged him. He was, however, captured and brought for judgment before the Council of War. Even in his last days, he was the victim of injustice: although Queen Maria II of Portugal granted him a pardon, for political and personal reasons the Council of War nevertheless sent him to his death before a firing squad. ^{[biased-discuss]}

== Life ==
José Joaquim de Sousa Reis was born in Estômbar, in 1796 to Joaquim José dos Reis and Clara Maria do Carmo. He was given the surname "de Sousa" by his godfather Reverend José Joaquim de Sousa, a priest. but it was São Bartolomeu de Messines the place where he settled, married and traced his destiny. As a boy, he went to study for the Catholic seminary in Faro. There he took the minor orders but, given his talent for oratory, he soon aroused the admiration of the bishop who authorized him to go up to the pulpit and speak to the people. However, he abandoned the promising ecclesiastical career to marry Maria Clara Machado de Bastos, daughter of a distinguished wealthy family. Still, it took a lot of persistence and use of all the rhetoric he learned to overcome the reluctance of the girl's uncle, a wealthy man and landowner in the vicinity of São Bartolomeu de Messines and São Marcos da Serra.

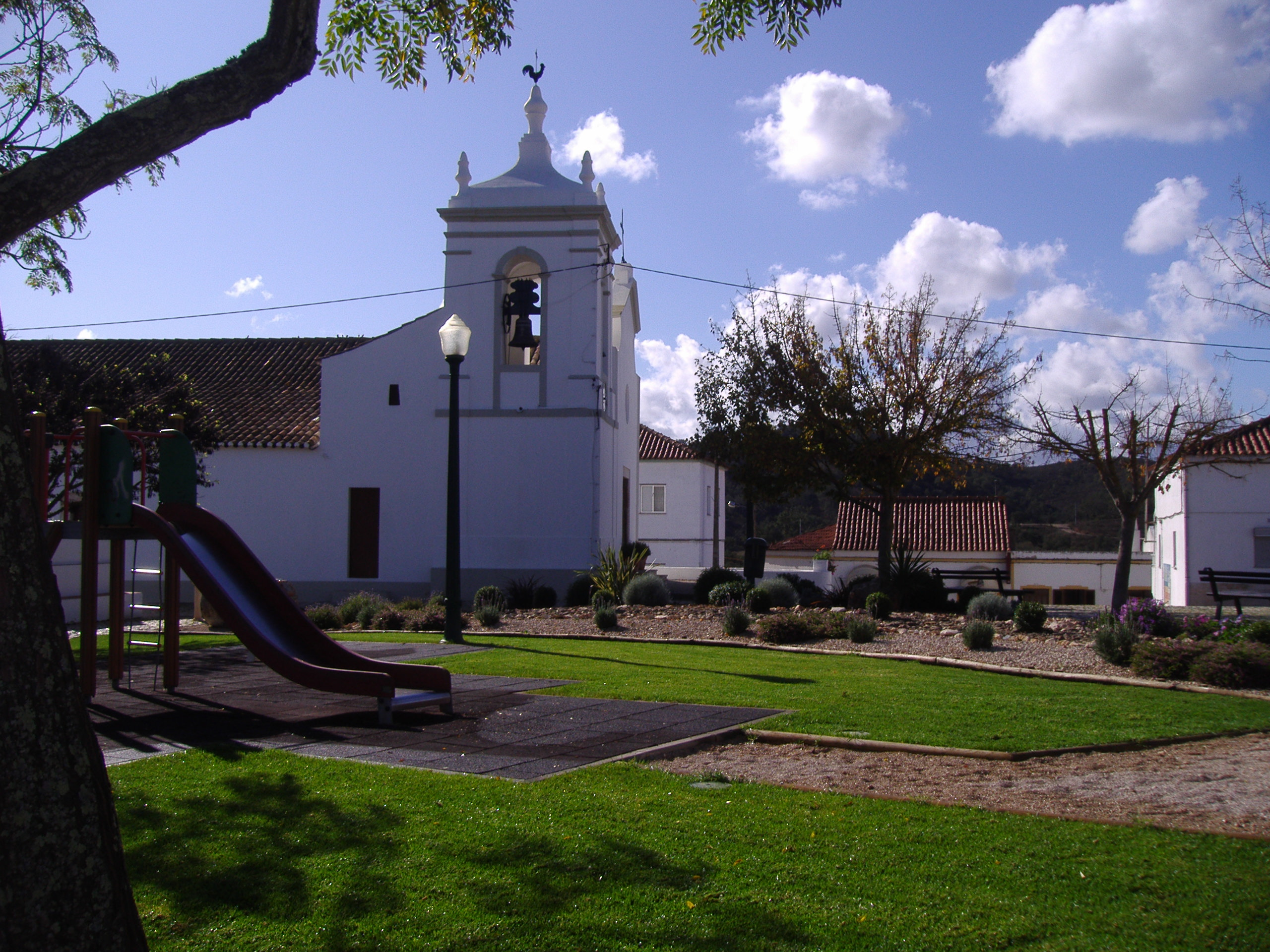
The Parish Church of São Marcos da Serra, a village where on its outskirts rests the so-called Cabana do Remexido (Remexido's Hut), where it is said that the famous antiliberal Miguelist, commander of legitimist guerrillas who spread fear and violence throughout the region of Algarve, was captured.

From this insistence, he received the nickname of Remexido from Maria Clara, which was forever stuck to his name. A literate young man, very talkative and in line with the absolutist regime of the time, he quickly gained a prominent social position and public recognition. He made improvements for the village of São Bartolomeu de Messines, like a public elementary school, a community oven and a free fair in honour of Nossa Senhora da Saúde (Our Lady of Health), which still takes place today. After the first liberal revolution of 1820 he was appointed juiz de vintena, an official magistrate position which would be abolished on January 1, 1831, due to the liberal revolution's ideals, simultaneously managing the assets of his wife's wealthy uncle. As juiz de vintena, he would personally collect the tithes of the lands of São Bartolomeu de Messines and São Marcos da Serra.

Some years later, as a guerrilla in the Serra do Caldeirão (Mountain of the Cauldron), a territory he knew very well, he became a headache for the liberal troops loyal to king Pedro V of Portugal in the civil war that opposed him to the absolutists of his brother Miguel (1828–1834). Once peace was signed in the Concession of Evoramonte on 26 May 1834, a return to normality was expected. However, the imprisonment of his wife and son, as well as the reprisals and political persecutions exercised by the liberals, winners of the fratricidal war, led the guerrilla to continue his military campaign with actions of violence all over the Algarve and Baixo Alentejo. The taking of Albufeira on July 26, 1833, at the time a liberal settlement, is an example of the slaughter and looting perpetrated by the antiliberal absolutist faction under the leadership of Remexido, causing about seven dozen victims among its civil population. And if the excesses of war can always be pointed out on either side of the strife, in the narrative built over time, the liberals made Remexido a bloodthirsty and "big-time guerrilla". A man - they said - who developed particular ferocity, "stabbing the prisoners, burning them alive and dragging them all on the tail of his horse." And to compose the legend, Remexido even had the honour of appearing in a collection of cordel literature, where history and fiction go hand in hand. As in all cases, however, some keep a different image of him as a romantic and idealistic hero, who sacrificed himself for the cause that seemed more just, although against the prevailing winds of liberal republican ideas that came from the French Revolution. Of him, Camilo Castelo Branco wrote: “The Remexido appears imbued with strong romantic tones, ending up exchanging a peaceful life as a farmer, for the plight of a struggle that earned him and his family, the harshest persecutions, against which he rebelled.” And the Algarve historian, Alberto Iria, extols Remexido by presenting him as “an intelligent person, endowed with a good and generous soul, with dignity and greatness at the service of his ideals.”

Taken prisoner in 1838, he was tried in a war tribunal in the Misericórdia Hall in Faro and sentenced to death. In the final allegations, in his defence, he said: “The only crime I committed was the crime of disobedience”, in obedience to an ideal and a cause in which I believed. With no possibility of appeal, he was executed by shooting, on August 2 of the same year, at 6 pm, in the Trindade field, where today is the Alameda João de Deus lane, in Faro, and buried in the Misericórdia cemetery.

== Marriage and issue ==
He was married in São Bartolomeu de Messines, in the municipality of Silves, on 26 July 1818 to Maria Clara Machado de Bastos, born in Paderne, in the municipality of Albufeira, daughter of Manuel Baptista Machado and wife Inês Inácia de Bastos, and had issue:

- Manuel Joaquim da Graça Remexido (1820 - Faro, 11 December 1839)
- José Manuel dos Reis
- João Raimundo de Sousa Reis (c. 1820 - Silves), married firstly to ... and had issue, and married secondly to ..., and had issue:
  - Maria de Sousa Reis Remexido, married to João Vitorino Mealha, and had issue (among others, paternal grandparents of the first wife of Manuel Tito de Morais)
  - Casimira de Sousa Reis Remexido, married to Casimiro dos Santos Velhinho, and had issue
- Maria Marciana
- Maria do Rosário
- Maria da Soledade
- Maria Marta
