= Odelouca River =

River in southern Portugal

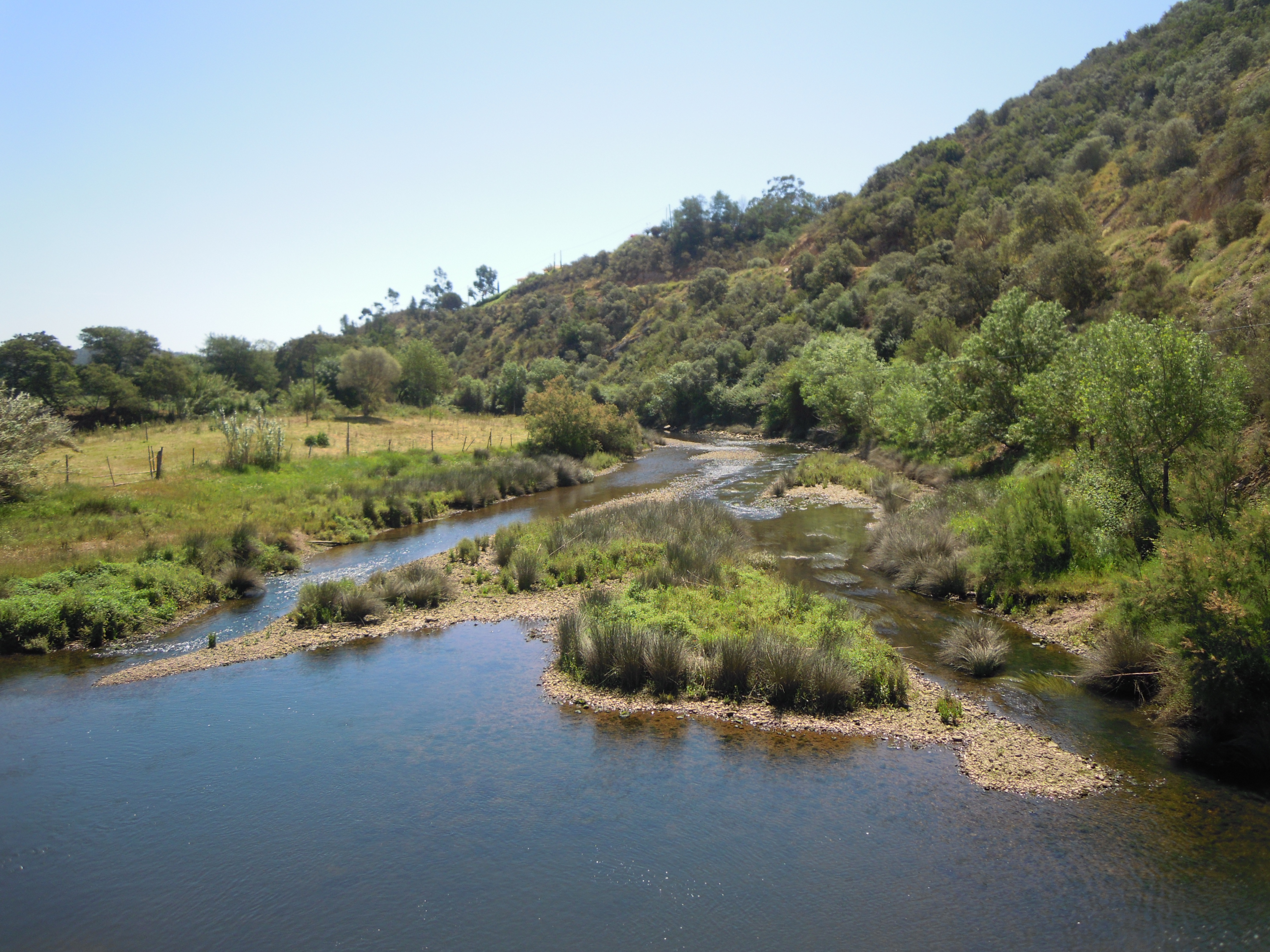

- Confluence of the Odelouca River and the Arade River
- Native name: Riberia de Odelouca (Portuguese)

Location
- Country: Portugal
- Region: Algarve
- District: Albufeira

Physical characteristics
- Source
  - location: Algarve
- Mouth: Into the Atlantic at Portimão via the Arade River

The Odelouca River (Portuguese pronunciation: [ɔðɨˈlokɐ]) is a river in the Portuguese region of the Algarve. The river is a tributary of the Arade River.

== Description ==
The Odelouca headwater sources are a number of small streams and brooks rising from springs between the Serra de Monchique and the Serra do Caldeirão. The river riparian margins are dense and, at times, lush with vegetation. These woody flanks are populated by Narrow leaf Ash, Willows, Poplar and Alder trees. In the lower reaches of the river can be found Tamarix and Oleander. Many of these riparian zones were lost following the construction of the Odelouca Dam (Barragem de Odelouca). From it headwater sources the river, which flows through the village of São Marcos da Serra, runs for approximately 83.7 kilometres (52.0 mi) until its confluence with the Arade River west of the town of Silves.

=== Barragem de Odelouca ===
Work began in 2002 on a project to dam the river north of its confluence with the Monchique River. The dam was built as to provide public water supplies for the surrounding municipalities. The dam was built in an important area of Algarve ecological and environmental importance and was opposed by the European Economic Community. The overwhelming need for water in the summer by the local population necessitates its construction despite the opposition. As part of agreements to allow construction, Conservation and environmental programmes were implemented to try to lessen the environmental impact of the Dam. The dam was inaugurated and commissioned for service in June 2012. The dam is 76.0 metres (249.3 ft) high and is constructed of earth and forms a lake behind which, when full, is 1.6 kilometres (0.99 mi) long and 418.0 metres (1,371.4 ft) at its widest point. The lake holds 100 million cubic metres (81,000 acre⋅ft) of water.

=== Ecological restoration schemes ===
Following the loss of habitats and environments following the filling of the dam measures have been taken to compensate for the losses. Restoration has been carried out along a 180-hectare (450-acre) stretch of the left bank of the river with the aim of encouraging the population of the endangered Iberian lynx and the Bonelli's eagle. This work also includes the National Centre for the Captive Breeding of the Iberian lynx.
