= Odelouca Dam =

Dam in Portugal

Odelouca Dam is a dam in the Odelouca River, in the region of Algarve, in Portugal. Work began in 2002 on a project to dam the river north of its confluence with the Monchique River. The dam was built as to provide public water supplies for the surrounding municipalities. The dam was built in an important area of Algarve ecological and environmental importance and was opposed by the European Economic Community. The overwhelming need for water in the summer by the local population urged its construction despite the opposition. As part of agreements to allow construction, conservation and environmental programmes were implemented to try to lessen the environmental impact of the Dam. The dam was inaugurated and commissioned for service in June 2012. The dam is 76.0 metres (249.3 ft) high and is constructed of earth and forms a lake behind which, when full, is 1.6 kilometres (0.99 mi) long and 418.0 metres (1,371.4 ft) at its widest point. The lake holds 100 million cubic metres (81,000 acre⋅ft) of water.
