= São Bartolomeu de Messines =

- Civil parish
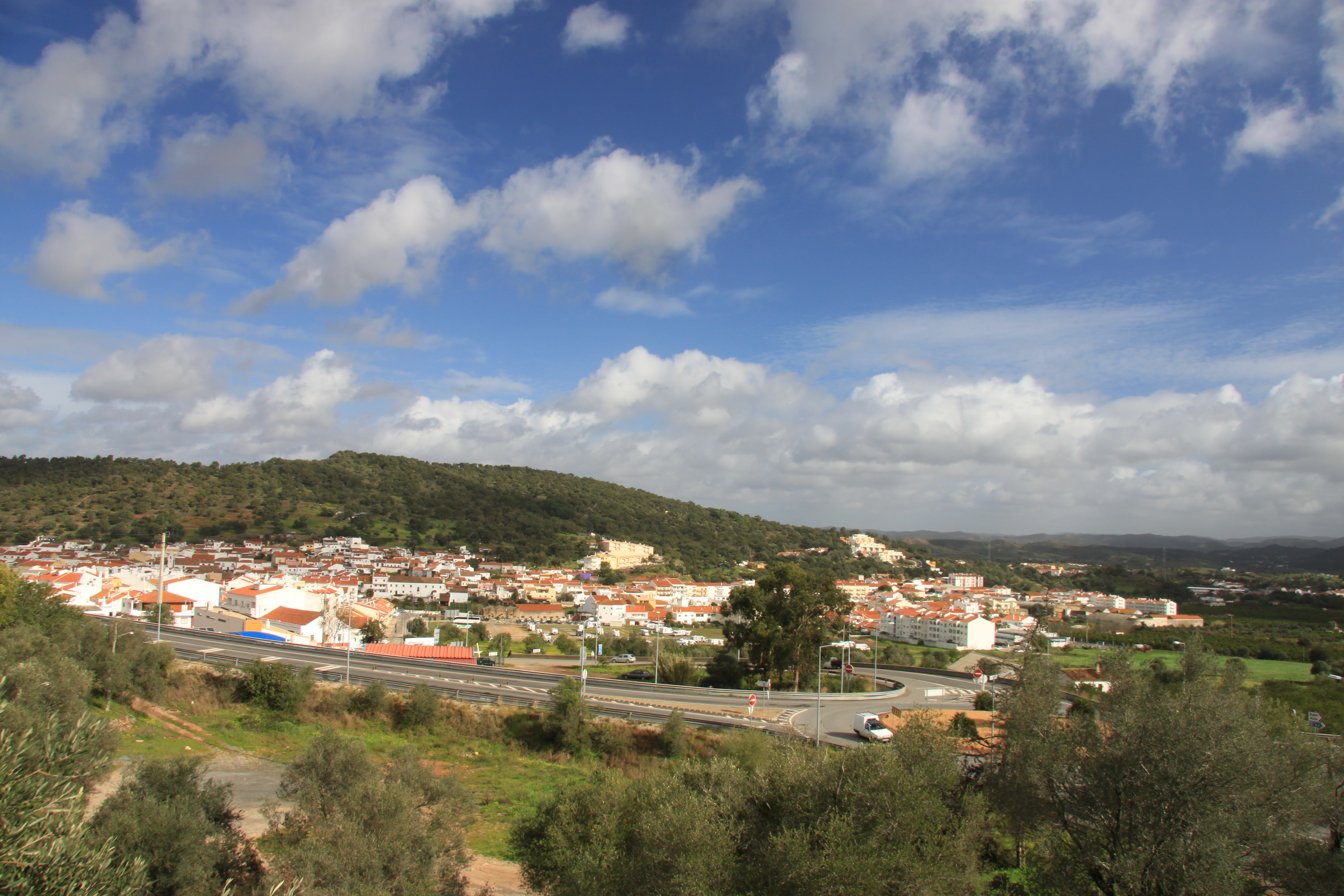

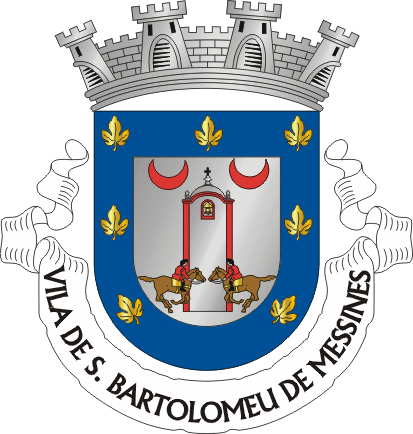
- Coat of arms

- Location in Portugal
- Coordinates: 37.257°N 8.287°W
- Country: Portugal
- Region: Algarve
- Intermunic. comm.: Algarve
- District: Faro
- Municipality: Silves

Area
  - Total: 239.87 km^{2} (92.61 sq mi)

Population (2011)
  - Total: 8,430
  - Density: 35.1/km^{2} (91.0/sq mi)
- Time zone: UTC+00:00 (WET)
  - Summer (DST): UTC+01:00 (WEST)

São Bartolomeu de Messines, also referred to as Messines, is a town and civil parish in the municipality of Silves, in Algarve region, Portugal. The population of the civil parish in 2011 was 8,430, in an area of 239.87 km^{2}.

== History ==
Traces of the Paleolithic and Neolithic vestiges have shown that this place was inhabited since the beginning of humanity. Although the Roman occupation has long been attested, it was between the years 2009 and 2014, during excavations in this parish, that was discovered a Roman villa, now known as the Roman Villa of Corte. This villa was the first building complex of the Roman period, located in the Algarve barrocal area, and the most important structure of this period, excavated in the Algarve region. The discovery of objects imported from southern Italy and Greece, allow researchers to assume that the people who lived in this place would have a high social status, showing some prosperity, and the discovery of materials related to textile production also make them assume that this would be one of the activities developed there. Under Muslim rule from the 8th century to the 12th century, it was previously known as Mussiene prior to its recapture from the Moors by the Kingdom of Portugal during the Reconquista, in 1189. During the period before the conquest by the troops of king Sancho I of Portugal and the crusaders, the parish of São Bartolomeu de Messines was then called Mussiene, a toponym of Arabic origin which derives from the Arabic word mâzin, which means complimentary. The use of adjectives to name places was not a common practice but there are other examples in Portugal such as the city of Elvas which derives from smiley in Arabic, Ourique (Wariq) from the Arabic word for verdant or Alte from the Arabic word for elegant. Unfortunately, the medieval church did not reach modern times which may be explained by the peripheral and interior location of the village, thus being distant from the main centers. The old town is mainly of 16th-century origin and its small, narrow cobbled streets are to be seen north of the main Church of São Bartolomeu de Messines at the end of the town's main street.

Engraving of Remexido, from ca. 1836, made by R. Vidal (fl. ca. 1836?).

In the nineteenth century, is through the guerrillas between Liberals and Miguelistas that the village of São Bartolomeu de Messines entered history as headquarters of José Joaquim de Sousa Reis, an antiliberal supporter of the absolutist status quo (thus a Miguelist) also known as "Remexido". It was still during the 19th century, with the implementation of various industries linked to the production of brandy, dried fruit, cork, esparto and others, that the parish could somehow overcome the isolation and know some progress, which was enhanced by the opening of roads and railways, thus allowing contact with the most relevant centers.

Still revisiting the heritage of this place, the most imposing building of the historical heritage of the village, is the Mother Church of Messines, built in the sixteenth century, which underwent remodeling in the early eighteenth century, which explains the mixture of styles that compose it. With a baroque portico, its torsa columns, in sandstone, in the Salomonic style, stand out as the only known examples in the Algarve. This church was consecrated to Saint Bartholomew, the saint to whom the faithful should pray. Along the hills of the town, there are four other religious sites worth mentioning: the Ermida de Nossa Senhora da Saúde, the Ermida de São Pedro, the Ermida de São Sebastião and the Ermida de Sant'Ana, all with red and white facades.

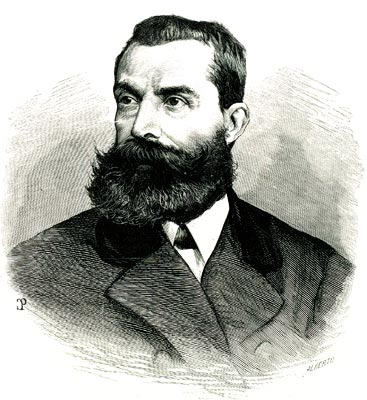
Portrait engraving of João de Deus Ramos, a Portuguese poet and creator of an innovative method to teach children to read who was born and raised in São Bartolomeu de Messines.

Nearby, next to the church, we also find the Casa Museu João de Deus, currently a museum, the place where the poet and pedagogue João de Deus lived. Today it functions as an open space for culture, but also as a place of homage and repository of memory of a figure that greatly marks not only this town, but also the country. The Costume and Traditions Museum displays the role of the work in the fields and on the land and its preponderance in the village economy, mainly associated to the production and commercialization of nuts, olive oil and also linked to pastoralism. João de Deus de Nogueira Ramos, mentioned above, is one of the unavoidable names, linked to São Bartolomeu de Messines. Considered the poet of love and "the most original of his time" by Antero de Quental, his path is inseparable from his lyrical work, but also with equal, or even greater importance, to his path as an educator and pedagogue. João de Deus not only dreamed of seeing his country able to read and write, but he also dedicated part of his life to make this dream come true through his literacy campaigns. A pioneer in the creation of a revolutionary methodology for teaching reading, his book he called "Cartilha Maternal", published in 1876, was translated into several languages, and is still considered current in many of its aspects. A son of this place, João de Deus is still today a source of pride in the land of his birth. Messines' main claim to fame is indeed being the birthplace of one of Portugal's most famous poets, João de Deus, who was born in São Bartolomeu de Messines and resided there in the 19th century. His famous "Cartilha Maternal" was used to teach Portuguese language during both the 19th and 20th centuries.

== Geography ==
It is a typical small Portuguese town, situated in the rising hills approximately 20 kilometres north of Albufeira, a city in the coast, and 16 kilometers southeast of São Marcos da Serra, a village in the Algarvean mountain range. The city of Silves, the seat of the municipality, is about 18 kilometers to southwest by road. The population of the civil parish of São Bartolomeu de Messines in 2011 was 8,430, in an area of 239.87 km^{2}.

== Population ==
Population of the São Bartolomeu de Messines civil parish

Year	Pop.	±%
1864	5,310	—
1878	5,924	+11.6%
1890	7,231	+22.1%
1900	8,468	+17.1%
1911	9,661	+14.1%

Year	Pop.	±%
1920	10,579	+9.5%
1930	11,450	+8.2%
1940	12,167	+6.3%
1950	11,755	−3.4%
1960	10,459	−11.0%

Year	Pop.	±%
1970	6,847	−34.5%
1981	8,460	+23.6%
1991	8,727	+3.2%
2001	8,491	−2.7%
2011	8,430	−0.7%

== Economy ==
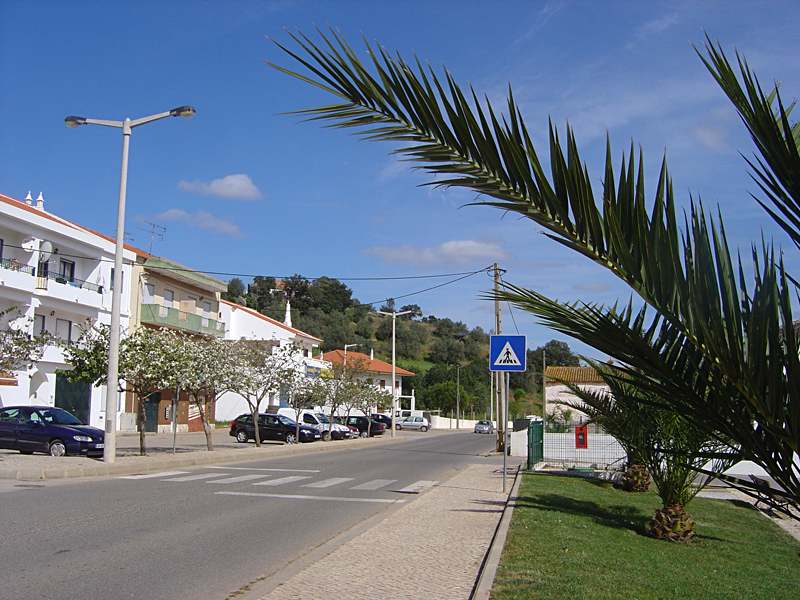
Looking east along the Rua Ramiro da Graça Cabrita in the town of São Bartolomeu de Messines.

The economy of São Bartolomeu de Messines revolves around agriculture, forestry, retail, local government and some light industry. There is a large market held on the outskirts of the town, by the bus station, every last Monday of the month, and a flea market every second Saturday of the month. The biggest supermarket in the town is an Intermarché with other smaller shops in the centre square.

== Transportation ==
The town is well served by both bus and train, with direct links to Faro, Lisbon and Spain by both rail and motorway. The toll-free IC1 Lisbon road also passes through the town. It is about 50 kilometres from Faro Airport by road.

== Notable people ==
- João de Deus Ramos (March 8, 1830 – January 11, 1896), better known as João de Deus, a Portuguese poet who turned his attention to Portuguese educational problems and wrote the famous didactic book Cartilha Maternal (1876), used to teach Portuguese language during both the 19th and 20th centuries across the country.
- Maria Alves da Silva Cavaco Silva (born 19 March 1938), wife of Aníbal Cavaco Silva, the 19th President of the Portuguese Republic and, as such, the First Lady of Portugal from 2006 until 2016.
- Remexido or Remechido, the nickname of José Joaquim de Sousa Reis (Estômbar, 19 October 1796 – Faro, 2 August 1838), a civil servant and wealthy land tenant who became a notorious guerrilla leader of the Algarve in Portugal, defending the rights of king Miguel to the Portuguese throne and the antiliberal absolute monarchy in the Kingdom of Portugal.
