= Silves =

Silves may refer to:

== Europe ==
- Silves, Portugal, municipality and former bishopric in Algarve, southern Portugal, and a parish of the same name within it
  - Castle of Silves, a medieval castle in civil parish of Silves
- Diocese of Silves, former bishopric with see in Silves
  - Silves Cathedral, its mother church in the municipality of Silves
- Taifa of Silves, medieval Muslim emirate around the city of Silves

== Americas ==
- Silves, Amazonas, municipality in state of Amazonas, Brazil;
- Ilha de Silves, the island with the same name as the municipality of Silves, Amazonas
