= Amélia Veiga =

Portuguese-born Angolan poet and teacher

- Born: 1 December 1931 (age 94); Silves, Portugal
- Occupation: Poet
- Writing career
- Language: Portuguese
- Genre: Poetry

Amélia Veiga, also known as Amélia Maria Ramos Veiga Silva (born 1931) is a Portuguese-born Angolan poet and teacher.

Amélia Veiga was born 1 December, 1931 in Silves, Portugal. In 1951 she moved to Angola, where she taught in Sá da Bandeira and began publishing poetry. She was awarded the Fernando Pessoa Prize by the Camara Municipality of Sá da Bandeira for her Poemas (1963).

Veiga also worked at the Centre for Higher Education on Policies Studies (CIPES) in Matosinhos, Portugal for several years.

Veiga's poem 'Angola', figuring the speaker's country as a surrogate mother, has frequently been anthologised.

== Works ==
- Destinos, 1961
- Poemas, 1963
- Libertação, 1974
