= Deutsche Schule Algarve =

- Escola Alemã do Algarve

Location
- Silves, Algarve; Portugal
- Coordinates: 37.14879°N 8.43163°W

Information
- Type: German international school
- Grades: Grundschule until grades 11-12
- Website: ds-algarve.org

Deutsche Schule Algarve (DSA; Portuguese: Escola Alemã do Algarve is a German international school in Silves, Algarve, Portugal. It serves Grundschule (primary school) until grades 11–12.
