= Castle of Silves =

Moorish fortification in Algarve, Portugal

- Castelo de Silves
- Faro, Algarve, Algarve in Portugal
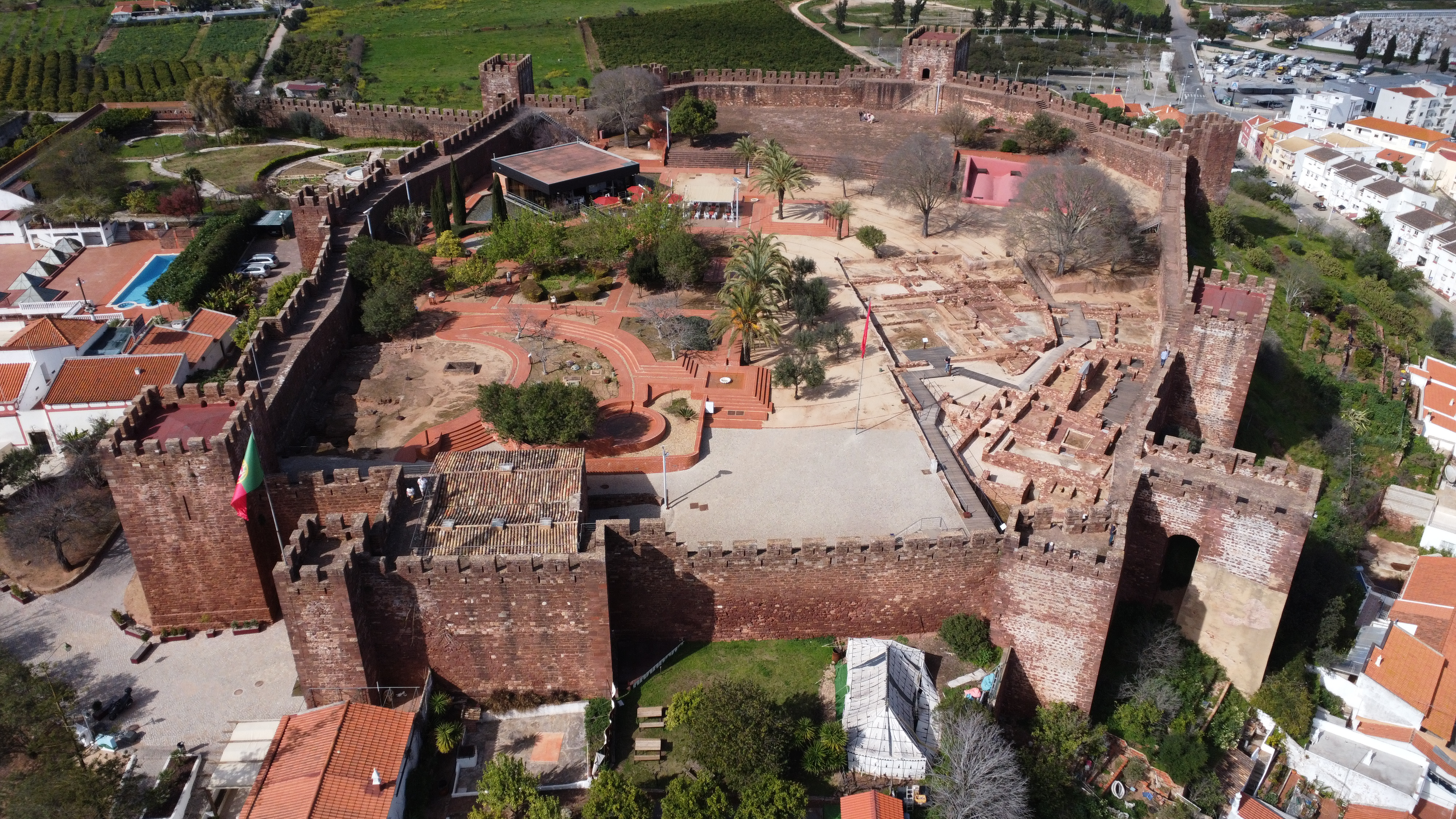
- Aerial view of Silves castle

Site information
- Type: Castle
- Owner: Portuguese Republic
- Operator: Câmara Municipal de Silves
- Open to the public: Public

Location
- Coordinates: 37°11′27.56″N 8°26′16.46″W

Site history
- Built: c. 201 BCE
- Materials: Taipa, Silves Sandstone, Masonry, Wood

The Castle of Silves is a castle in the civil parish of Silves in the municipality of Silves in the Portuguese Algarve. It's believed that the first fortifications were built upon a possible Lusitanian castro, by the Romans or Visigoths. Between the 8th and 13th centuries, the castle was occupied by the Arabs who expanded it, making it one of the best preserved Arab fortifications in Portugal, resulting in its classification as a National Monument in 1910.

== History ==
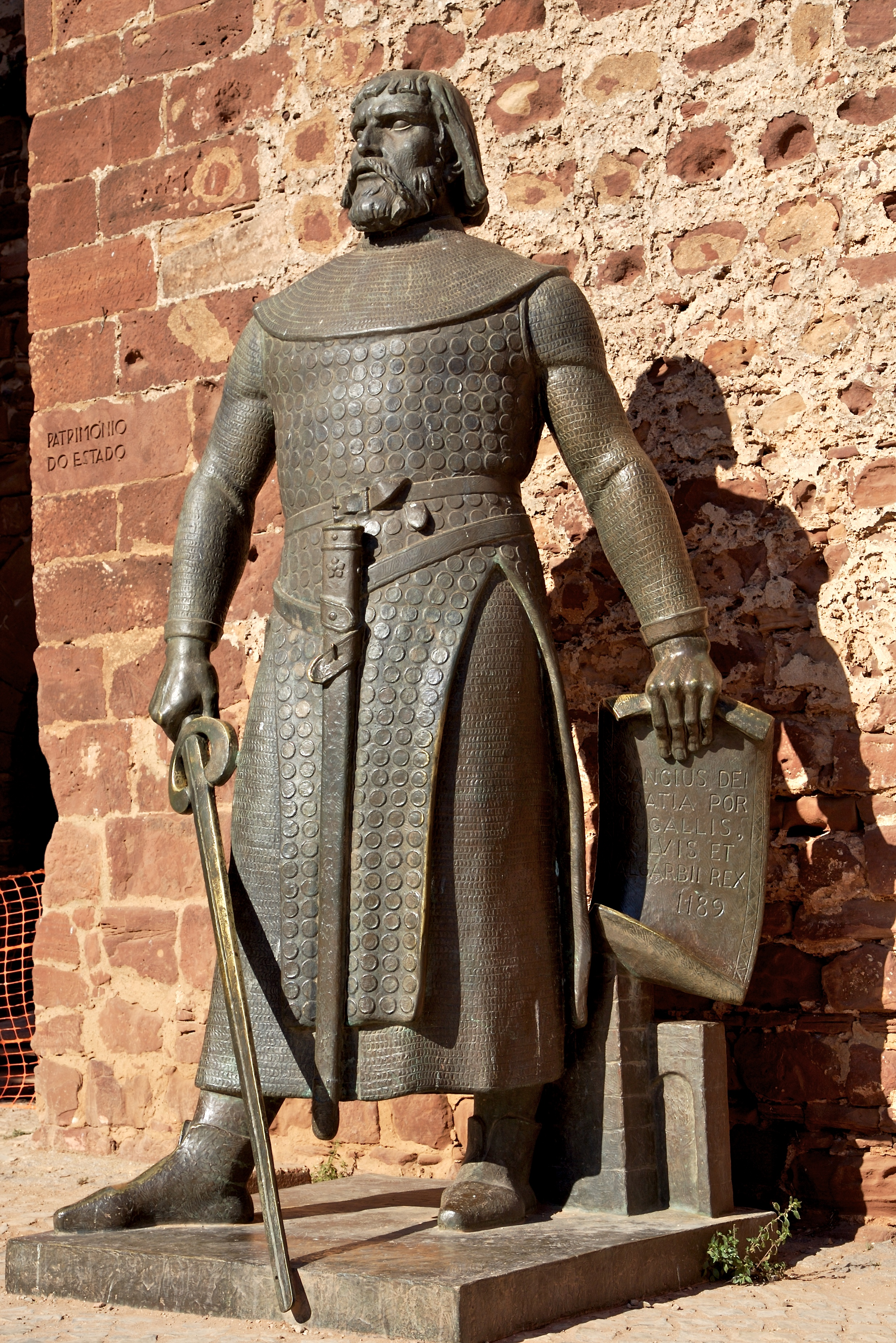
A statue of Sancho I of Portugal whose forces, supported by an even stronger Crusader army, conquered the citadel of Silves in 1189

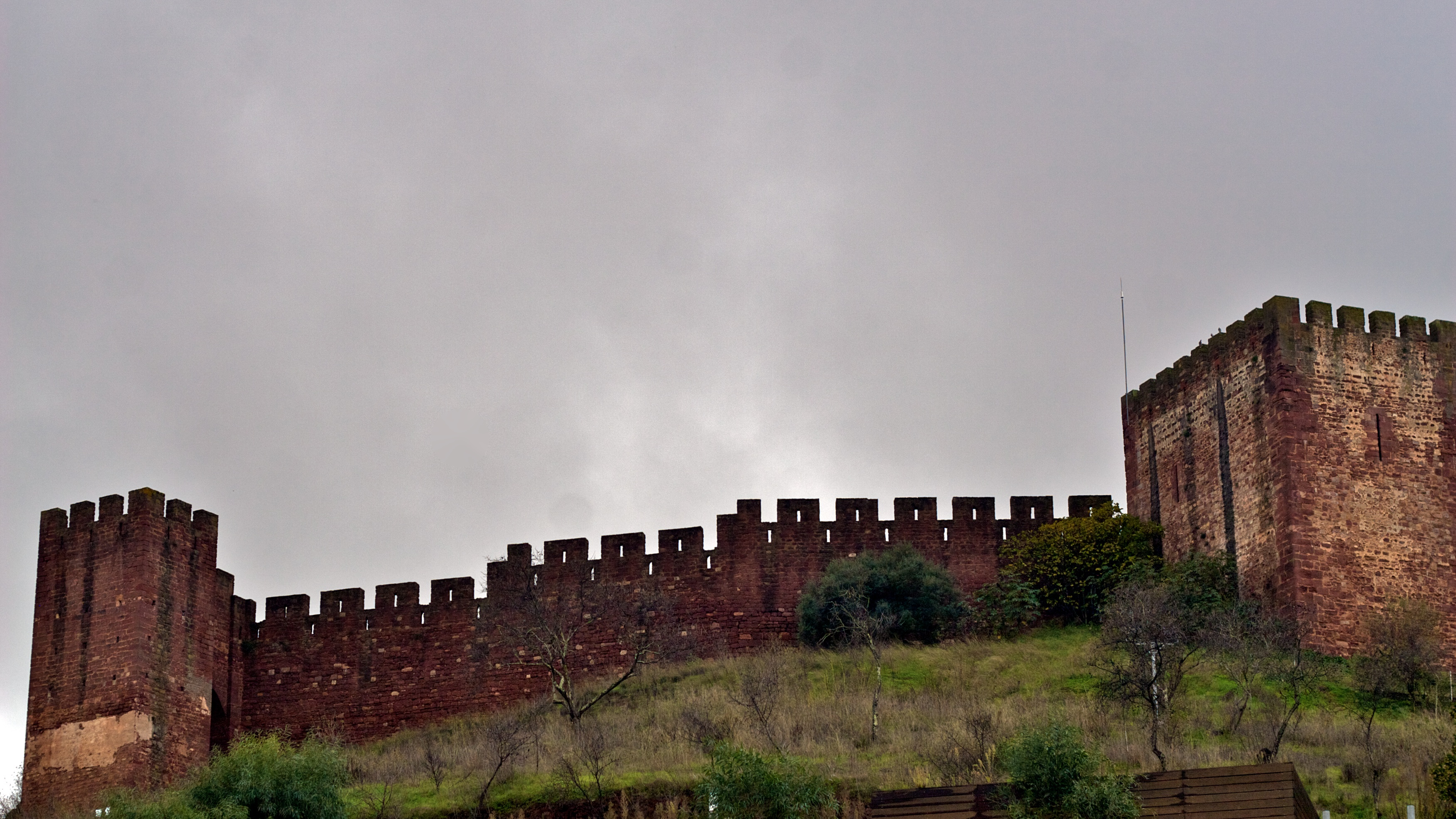
The imposing citadel as seen from below in the surrounding district of Silves

From archaeological excavations, it is assumed that the first fortress on this site consisted of a Lusitanian castro. It is believed that Phoenicans, Greeks and Carthaginians traversed the site at one time, but that around 201 B.C. the Romans conquered Silves, transforming it into a citadel of their occupation, and commercial center that prospered for the next five centuries.

Around 716 A.D., the Visigothic citadel was conquered by the Umayyad Caliphate who reinforced the existing fortifications with a new series of walls. This new period resulted in a great period of development, under the Arab occupiers, that include the extensive walls in the west. In 1160, it was sacked by Ferdinand I of León and Castile, but remained only for a short time in the hand of the Christians: it was quickly recaptured by the Moors. King Sancho I of Portugal, supported by the powerful Crusader army, conquered the city, after a prolong siege in 1189. But, a grande army, under orders from Amir al-Mu'minin, in 1191, retook the city. The buildings of the Taifa kingdoms of the 11th century, which includes the Palace of Balconies (where Al-Mutamid, lived as the poet Ibn Amarhe) progressed in the 11th century. The walls and towers that today represent the Castle of Silves came from these campaigns and public works by Almoravides and Almohads in the 12th and 13th centuries. The castles internal water catchment, and large rain fed underground cistern were used to provide freshwater for the surrounding dwellings (to as late as the 1920s). It would only be in the 13th century, during the reign of Afonso III of Portugal, that forces under the command of D. Paio Peres Correia, would definitively take the fortress.

=== Kingdom ===
A foral was issued in 1266 by King Afonso III of Portugal. In order to expand the influence of Portuguese control, this foral was then supported by residential concessions from King Denis (in 1305), that were later repeated in 1380, under King Fernando I of Portugal. But, even naming Prince Henry the Navigator alcalde for Silves (in 1457), and new concessions in 1487, under King John II, little development occurred in the territory.

On 1 November 1755, the castle was damaged by the Lisbon earthquake, resulting in the "...loss of its cathedral, tower, castle and walls...", as identified by Moreira de Mendonça (1758). Sometime during the 18th century, the dungeons were reconstructed, following the earthquake, and the ceilings repainted.

During the Liberal Wars the walls were repaired by the population, under Remexido, who ignored the foundations of the original castle.

=== Republic ===
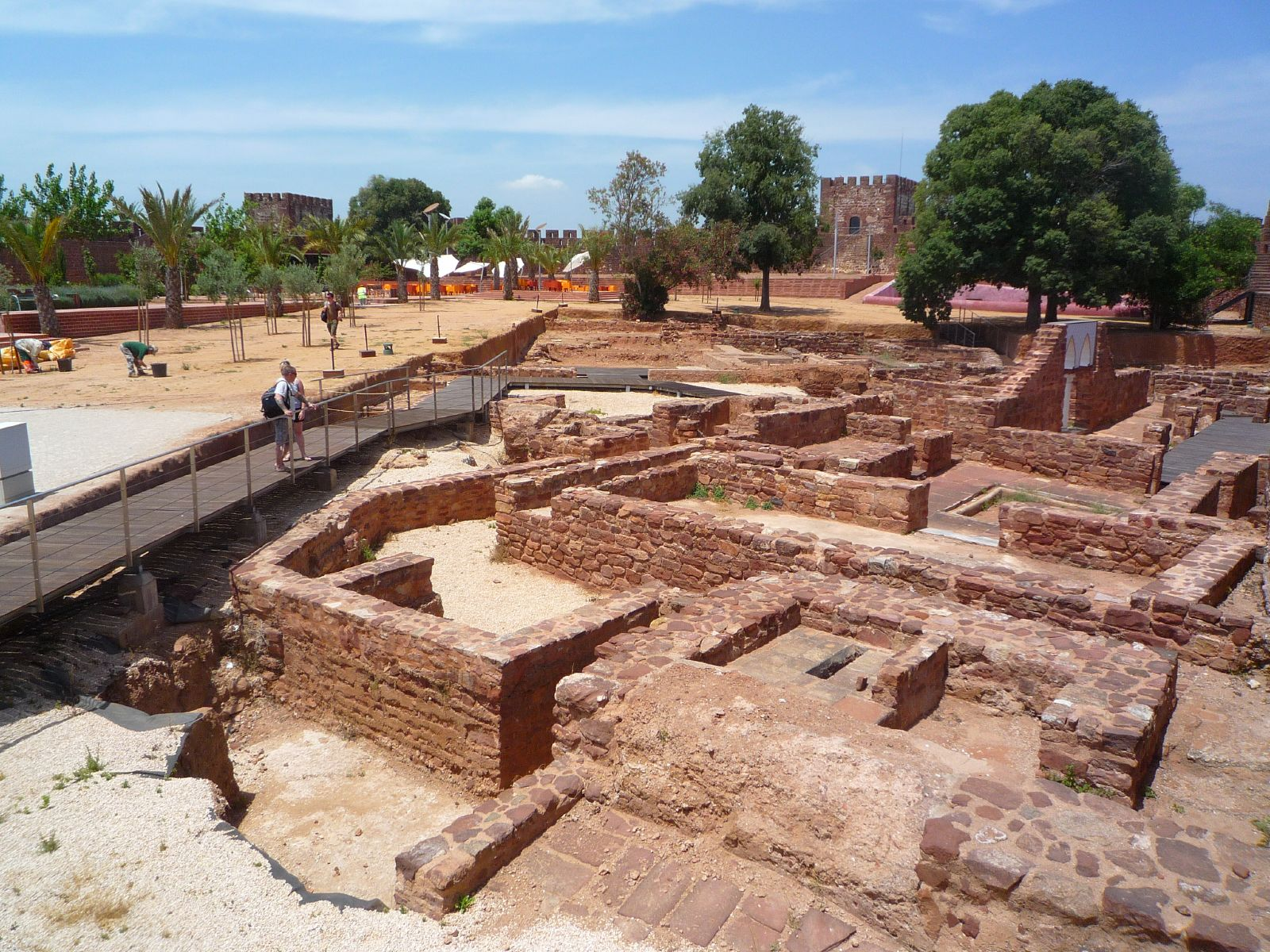
The pathways that provide visitors a close glimpse of the archaeological excavations in Silves Castle

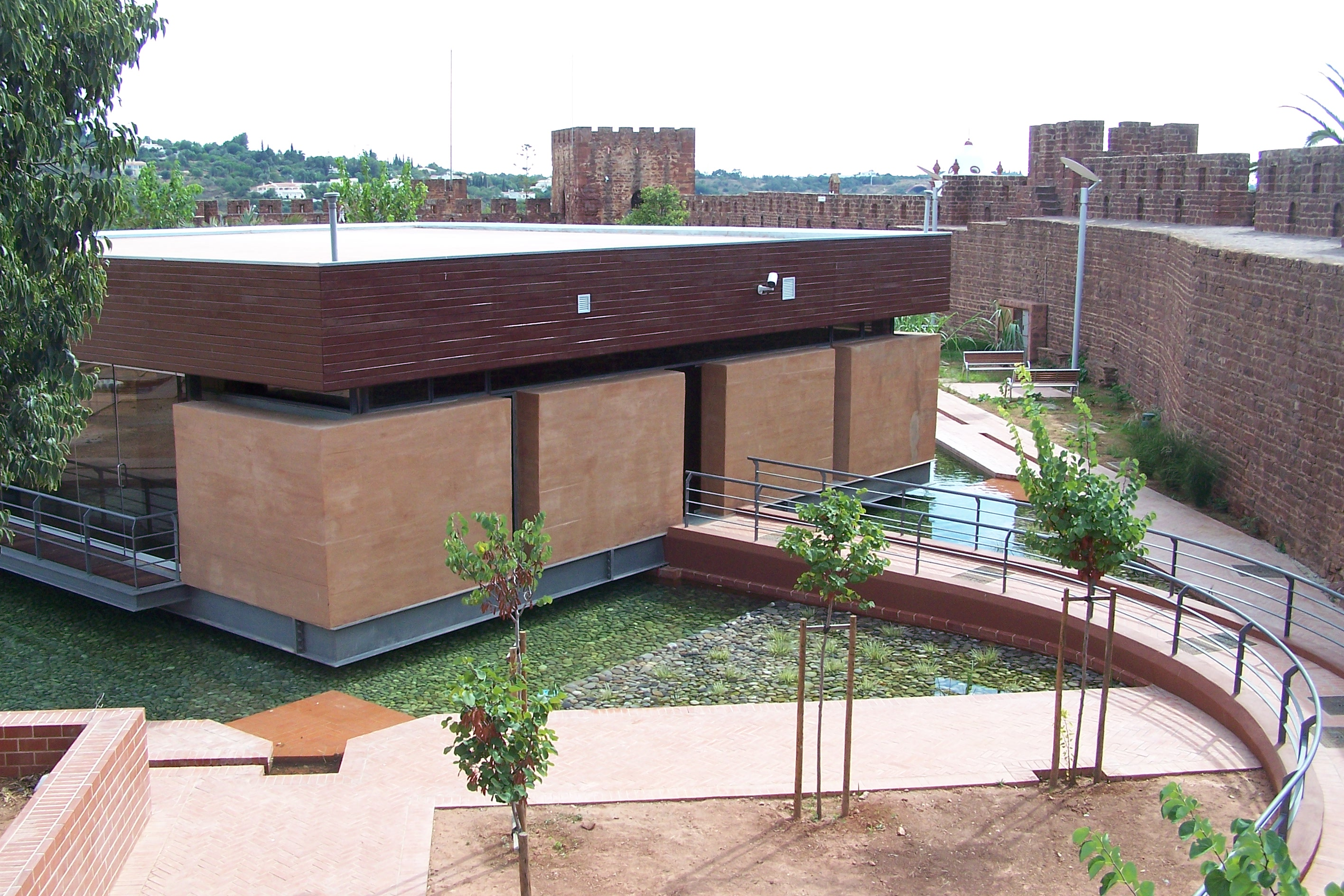
The visitor and interpretative centre within the shadow of the castle

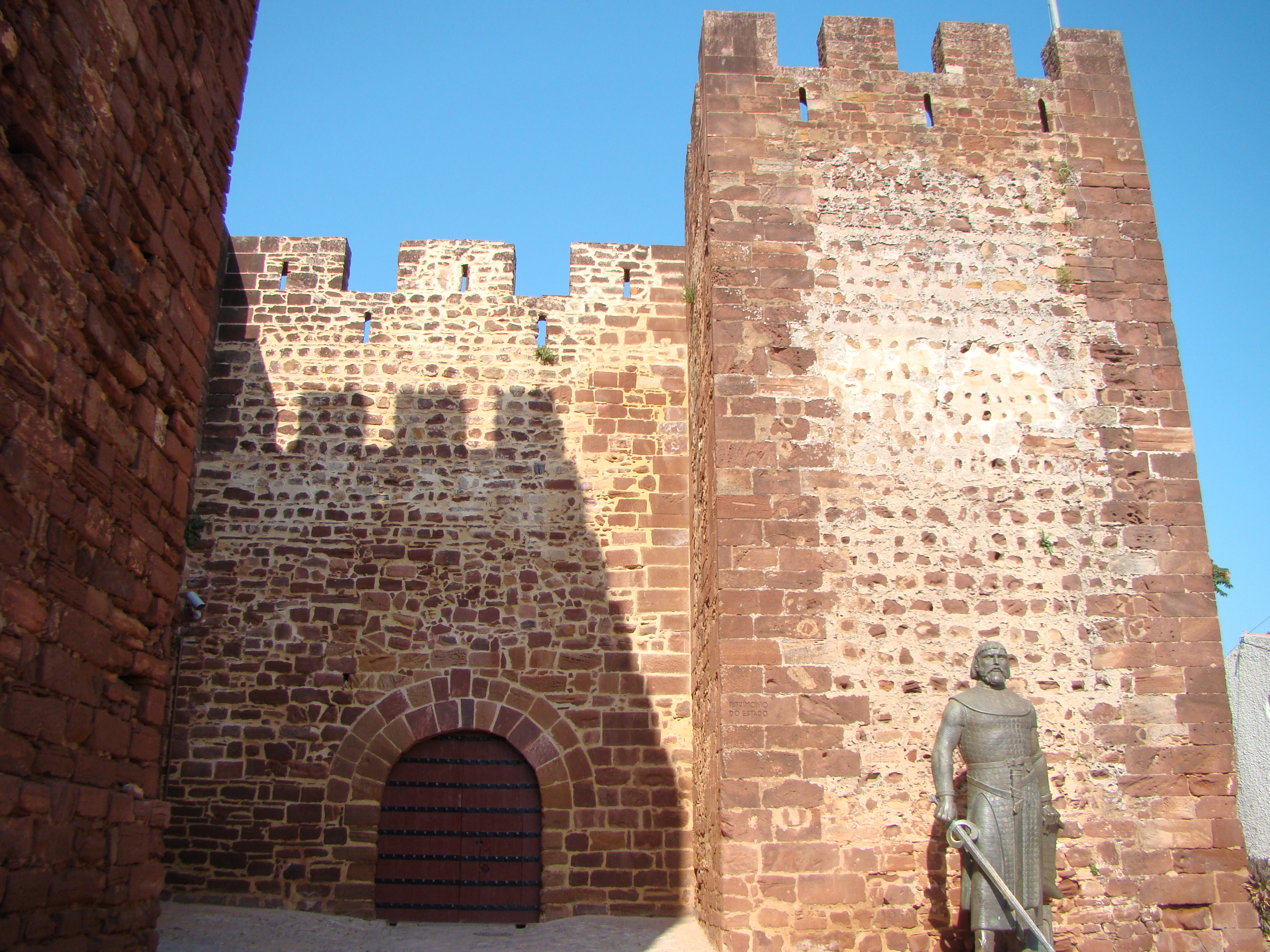
Entrance to the castle

In excavations beginning on 13 August 2005 and lasting into 2006, archaeologists Rosa and Mário Varela Gomes brought light onto the vestiges of the Muslim ruins, and in particular the 11th century governors palace, occupied by Al-Mutamid (from designs of polychromatic stucco). During the construction of the tea house, vestiges of another building, that was occupied by the Infante Henry, along the southwest of the military square, near the walls. In March 2005, a risk assessment map for the zone was completed for the principal entrance-way by the DGEMN. This resulted in a proposal by the IPPAR and Direção Regional de Cultura de Faro to expand the zone of protection to include the walls and Almedina Gate, on 12 June 2008, and approved on 1 October 2008 by the IGESPAR.

The DGEMN made its first intervention in the decade of 1940, demolishing the buildings annexed to the walls of the castle, and construction to lower the soil surfaces near the entrance to the castle and in the military square. At the same time, the rooftops of the guardhouse was re-tiled; the reconstruction of one of the towers in a degraded state of ruin; recuperation of various walls; consolidation of the keep tower and restoration of the parapets; reconstruction of the battlements; recuperation of the gates; re-plastering in the guardhouse; and the general cleaning of the cistern in the military square.

Two decades later (1965) the walls were repaired following the removal a shed along its flanks, which involved of the repair of the axis. In 1967, work began on a municipal museum within the towers of the castle, resulting in the ornamentation of the towers in regional tile; retouches and reconstruction of spaces; and the installation of electricity.

Starting in 1971, there were a series of demolitions and reconstructions in the castle, that included the 1977 consolidation of the walls; the 1979 re-layering of freestones; replacement of the gate; repairs and cleaning of the rooftops; consolidation of the walls in the north and east (in 1980); consolidation of two towers; and, beginning in 1982 (but also in 1984, 1985, 1986 and 1987) general recuperation of the site. This process was repeated in 1993, then starting in 2005 there were a series of public works to recover and recuperate the dungeons, including the installation of new rafters, water protection and improvement of drainage structures. Meanwhile, the Centre for the Studies of Art and Archeology of Tomar (Portuguese: Centro de estudos de Arte e Arqueologia de Tomar) was involved with museum-ification of some of the spaces, using the spaces to establish the administrative and educational services, in addition to creating a botanical garden, related to the Portugueses Discoveries period, within the old Governor's garden.

Further restoration, and excavation are ongoing, with more early buildings being discovered just outside the castle walls.

The building in the photograph of the 'interpretive and visitor centre is now a cafe and the rear view is the entrance to the toilets. There is no invitation to enter and gain any information of the castle.

== Architecture ==
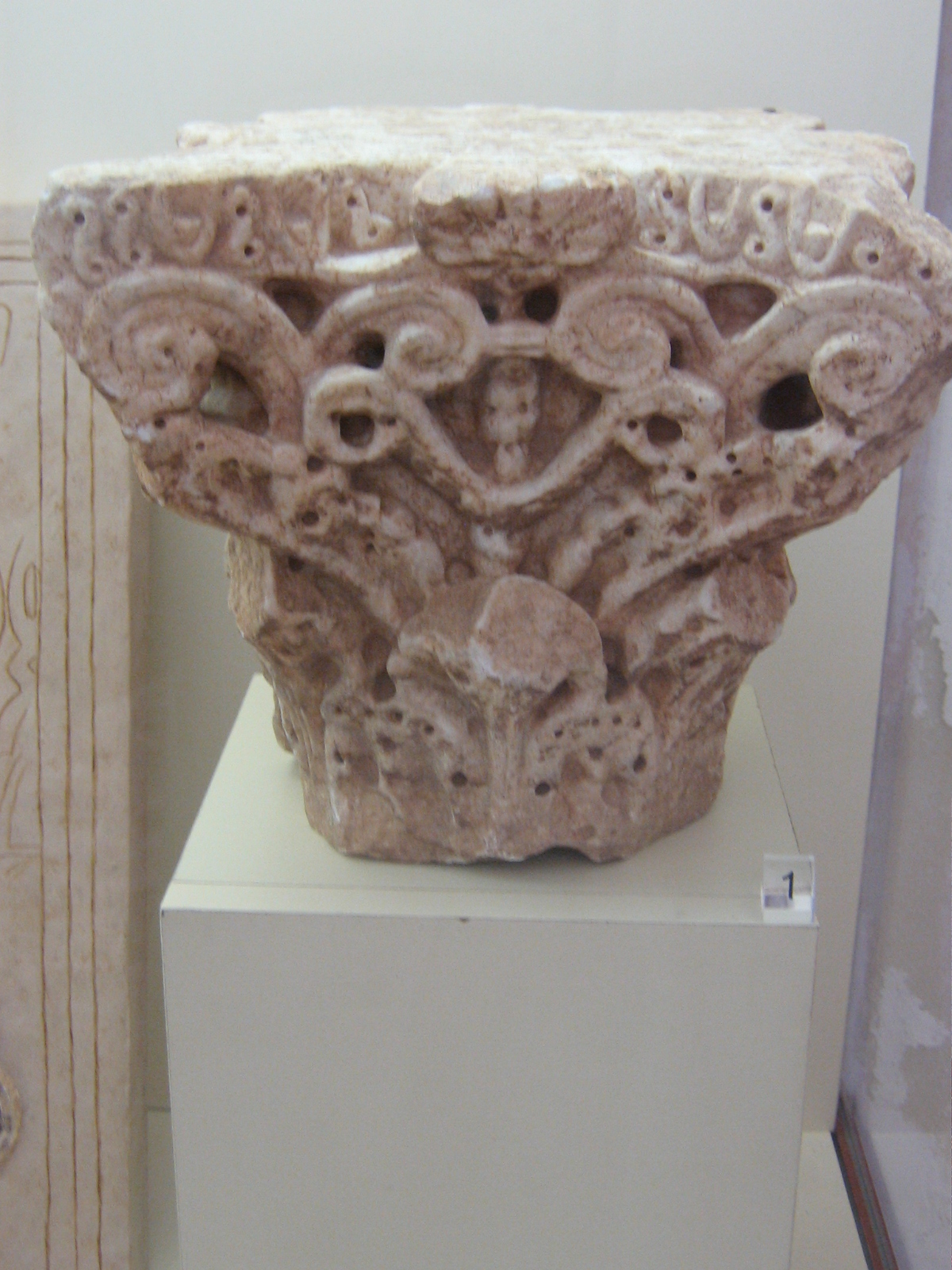
A remnant of the Visigothic occupation of the hilltop

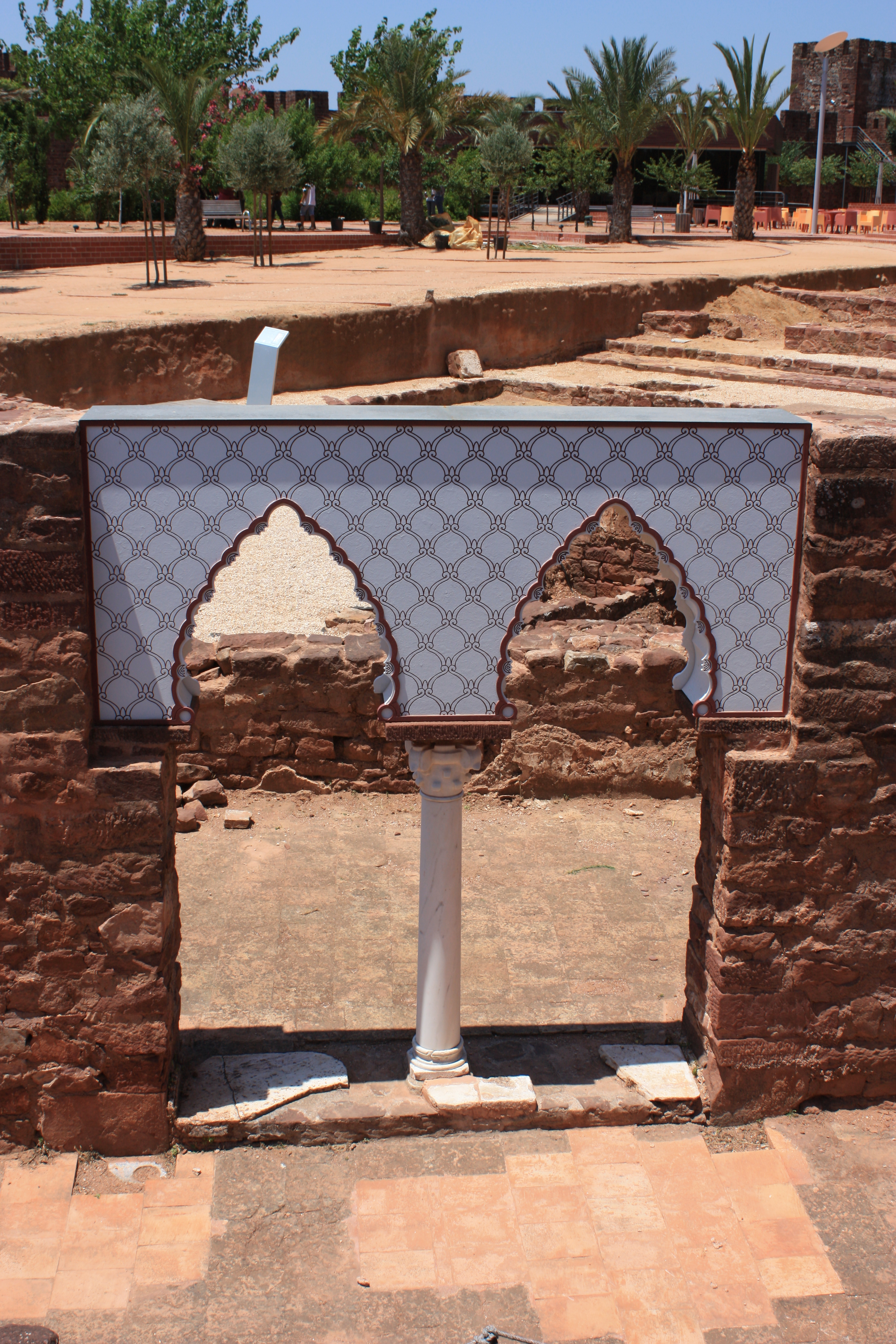
The vaulted Moorish windows of the Palace of Balconies

The castle consists of an irregular polygon implanted on a hilltop overlooking the community of Silves, comprising four towers and seven crenellated posts, linked by walls with battlements.

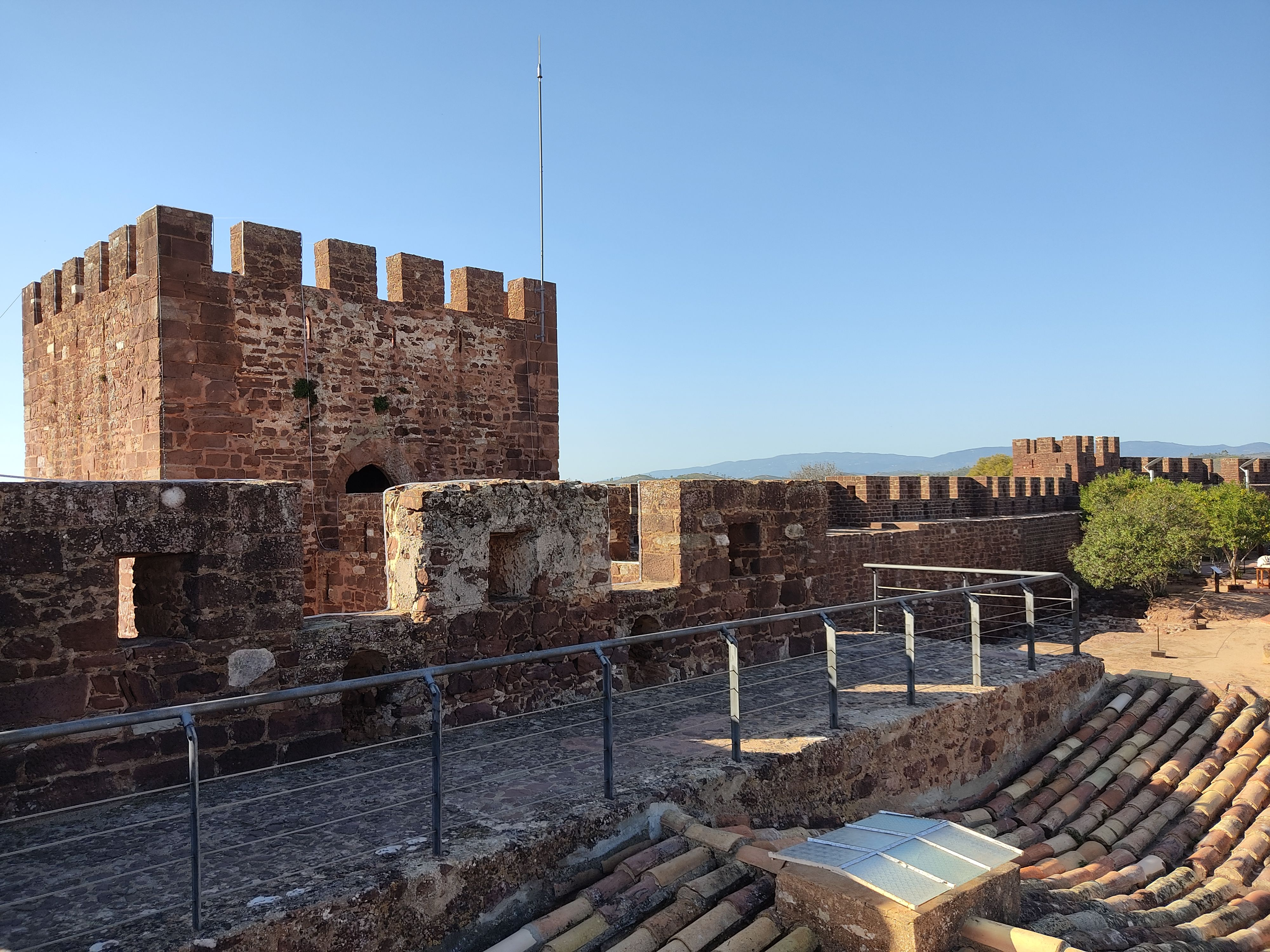
Southwest Tower of Silves's castle in Silves, Algarve, Portugal

Two gates, the principal one between two towers and the Traitor's Gate carved into the northern wall. Alongside the principal gate is the guardhouse, constructed with a vaulted ceiling, and covered in tiles.

Within its courtyard are various subterranean structures, with accesses at soil level. The Cistern of Moura, is a 10 metres (33 ft) high, 820 square metres (8,800 ft^{2}) superficial area, with five naves marked by four orders of columns, interlinked by semi-circular archways. The Cisterna dos Cães, within the courtyard, is a vertical hole of 60 metres (200 ft) depth, that also supported water supply in the castle.

=== Interior ===
On the second floor of the Governor's residence, there are two halls covered in painted wood. One of these halls includes a painting of royal arms, framed in shells and acanthus leaves, while on the four lateral panels, are military "trophies" comprising suits of armor, flags, lances, canons, muskets and drums. In the other hall is an allegory of Mars flanked by figurative and floral medallions.

In the military square, and alongside the southwest wall, are the vestiges of a house, presumably the residence of Prince Henry (when he was the alcalde of the Algarve), that includes foundations in dirt, a stone staircase (with a single on one flight), a spacious living room with the remains of a vaulted ceiling, olive oil press and pesto.
