= Silves, Portugal =

Silves
- Municipality
- City of Silves
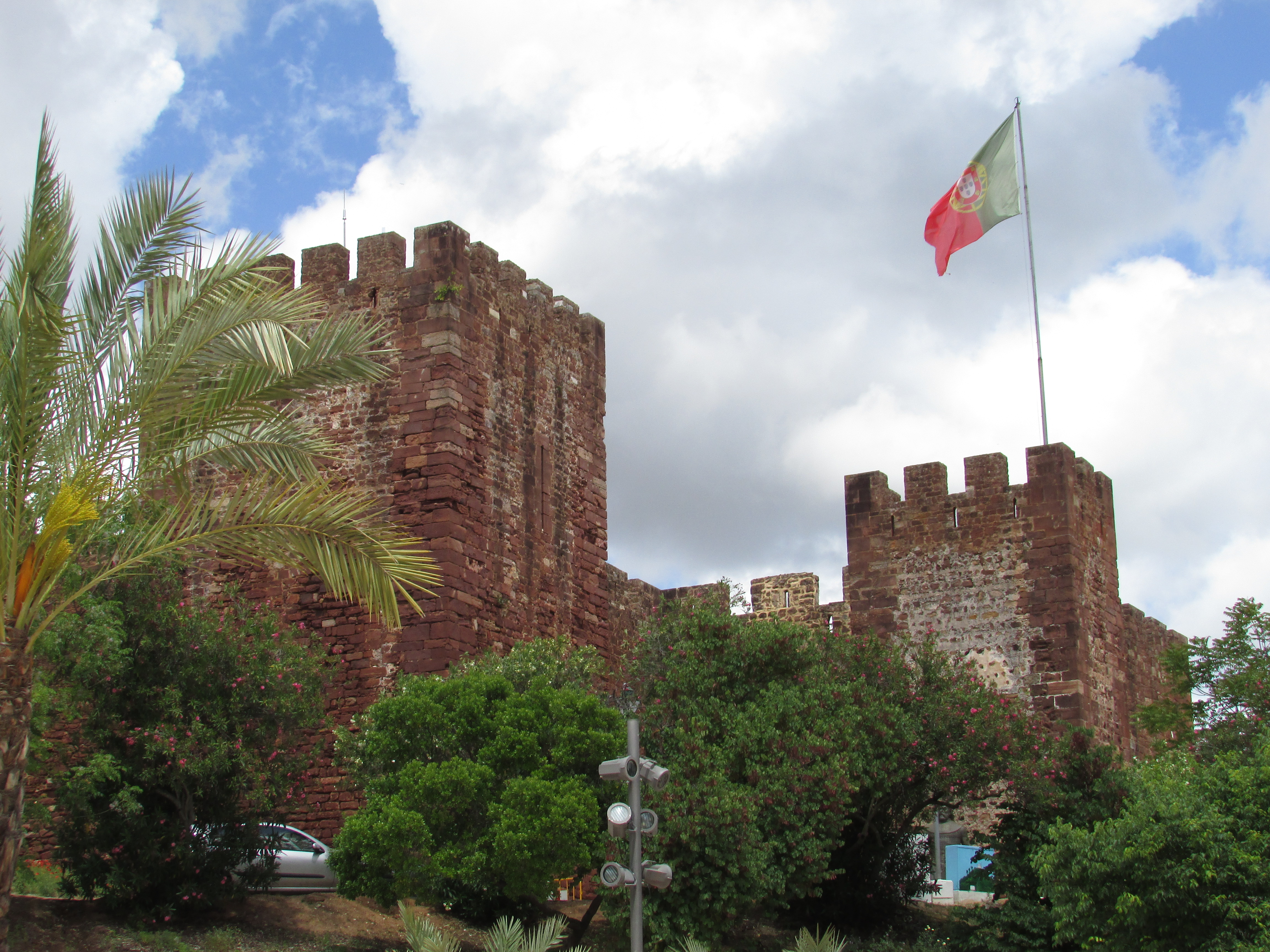
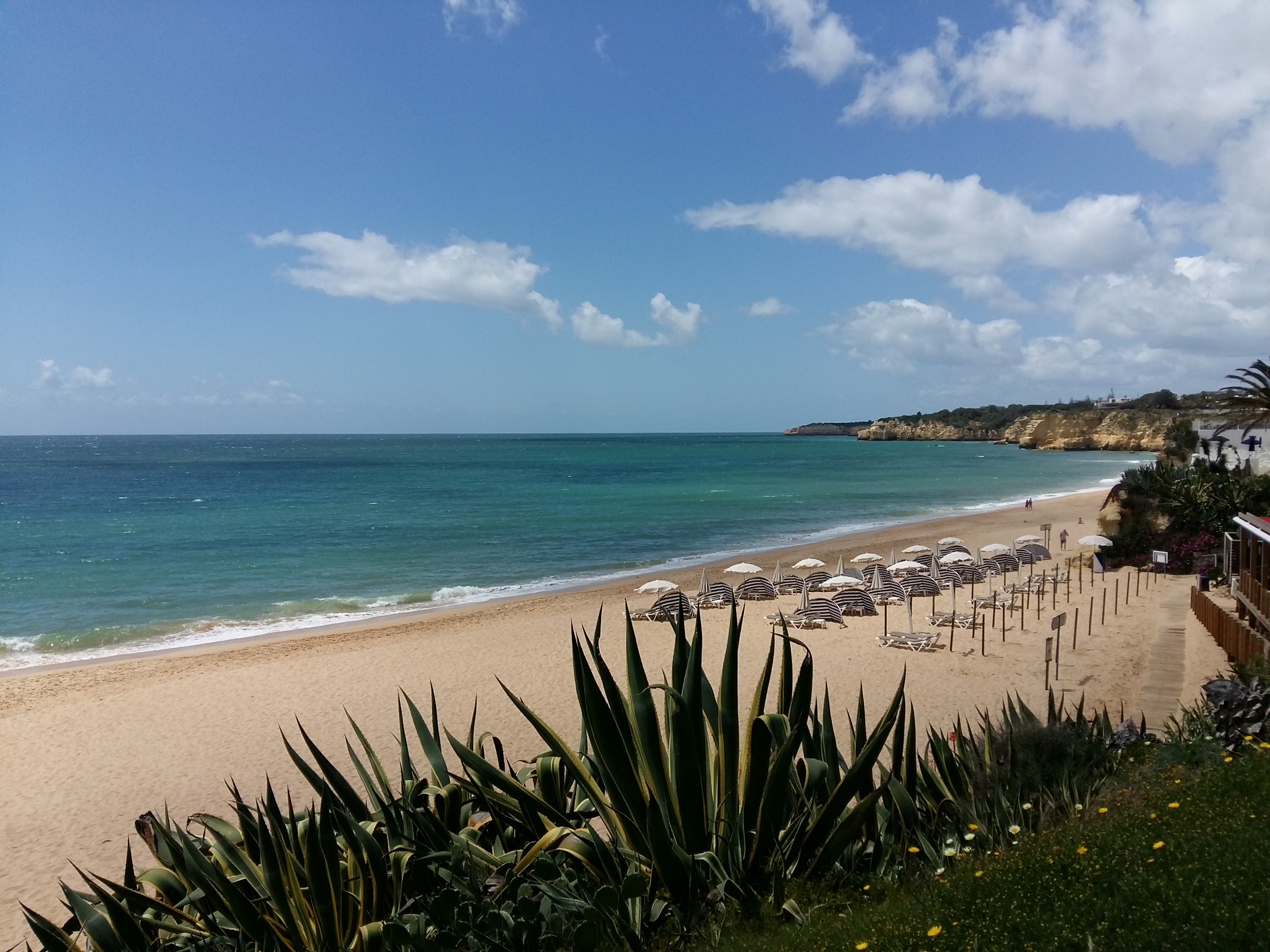
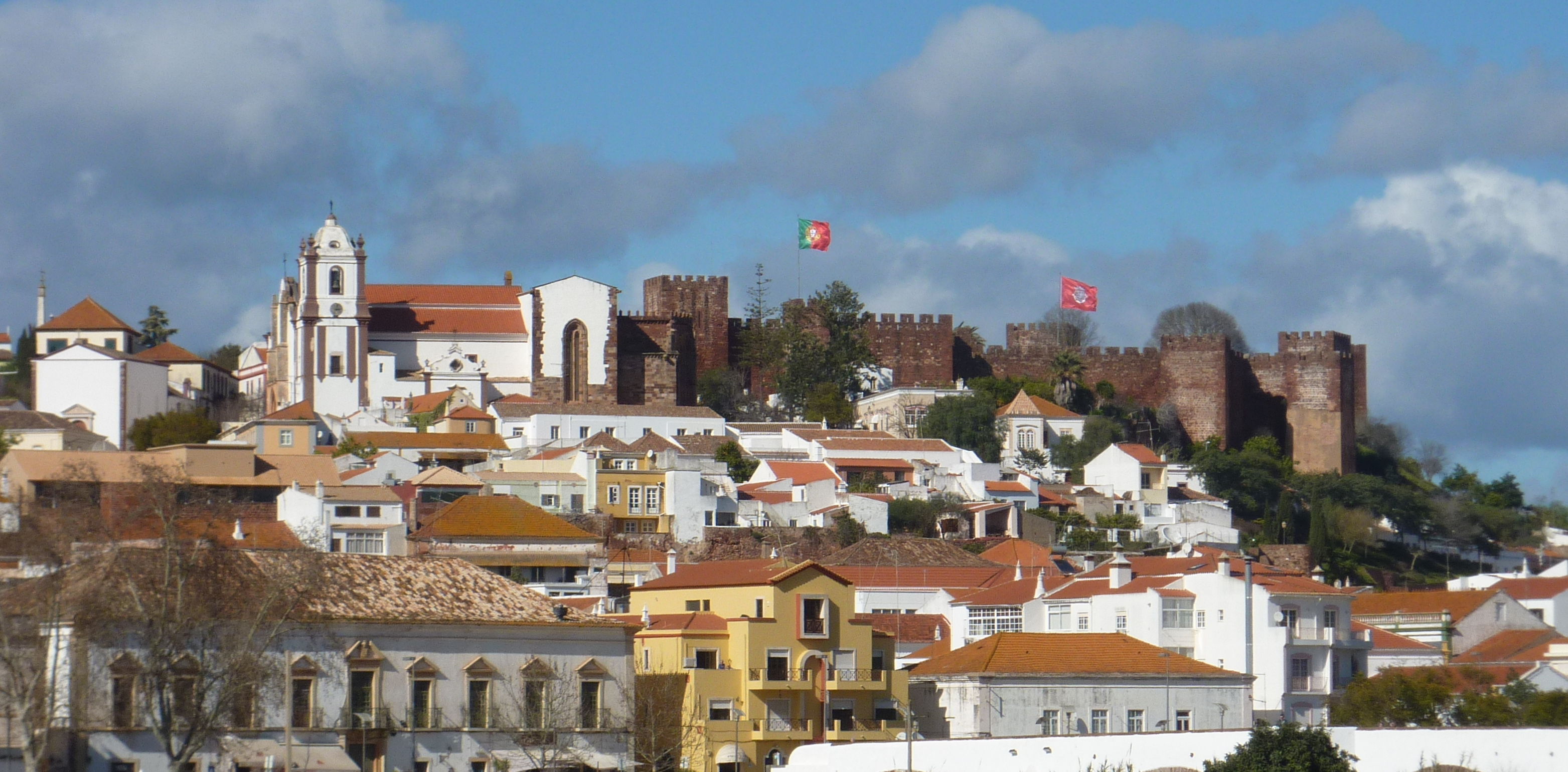
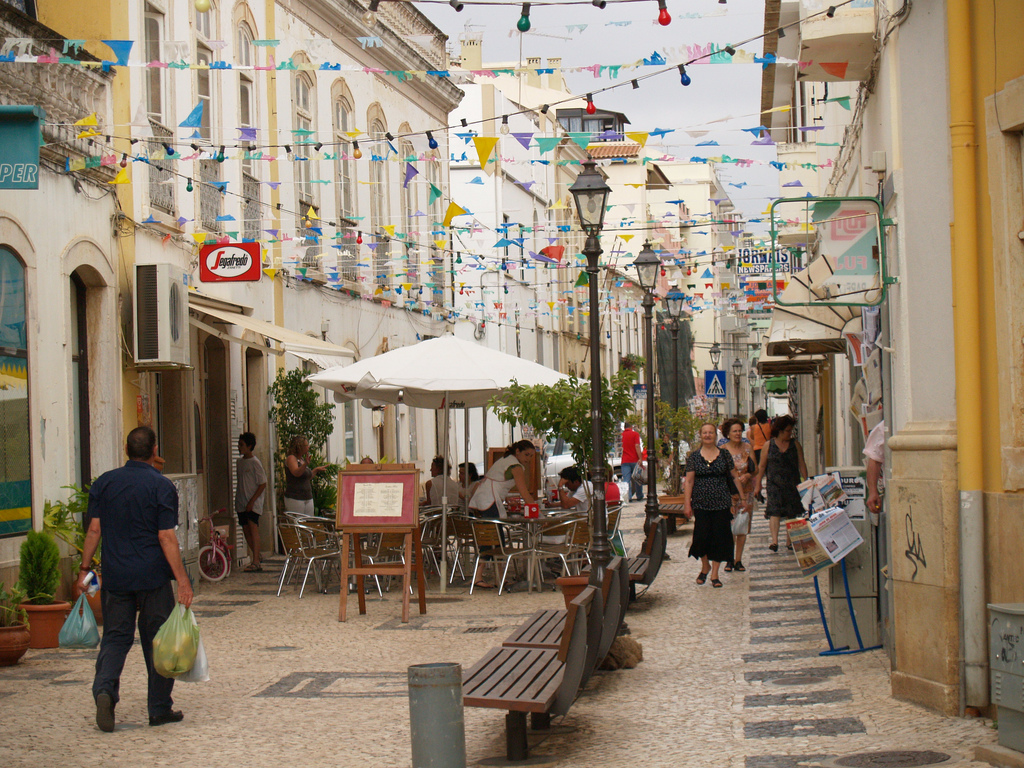
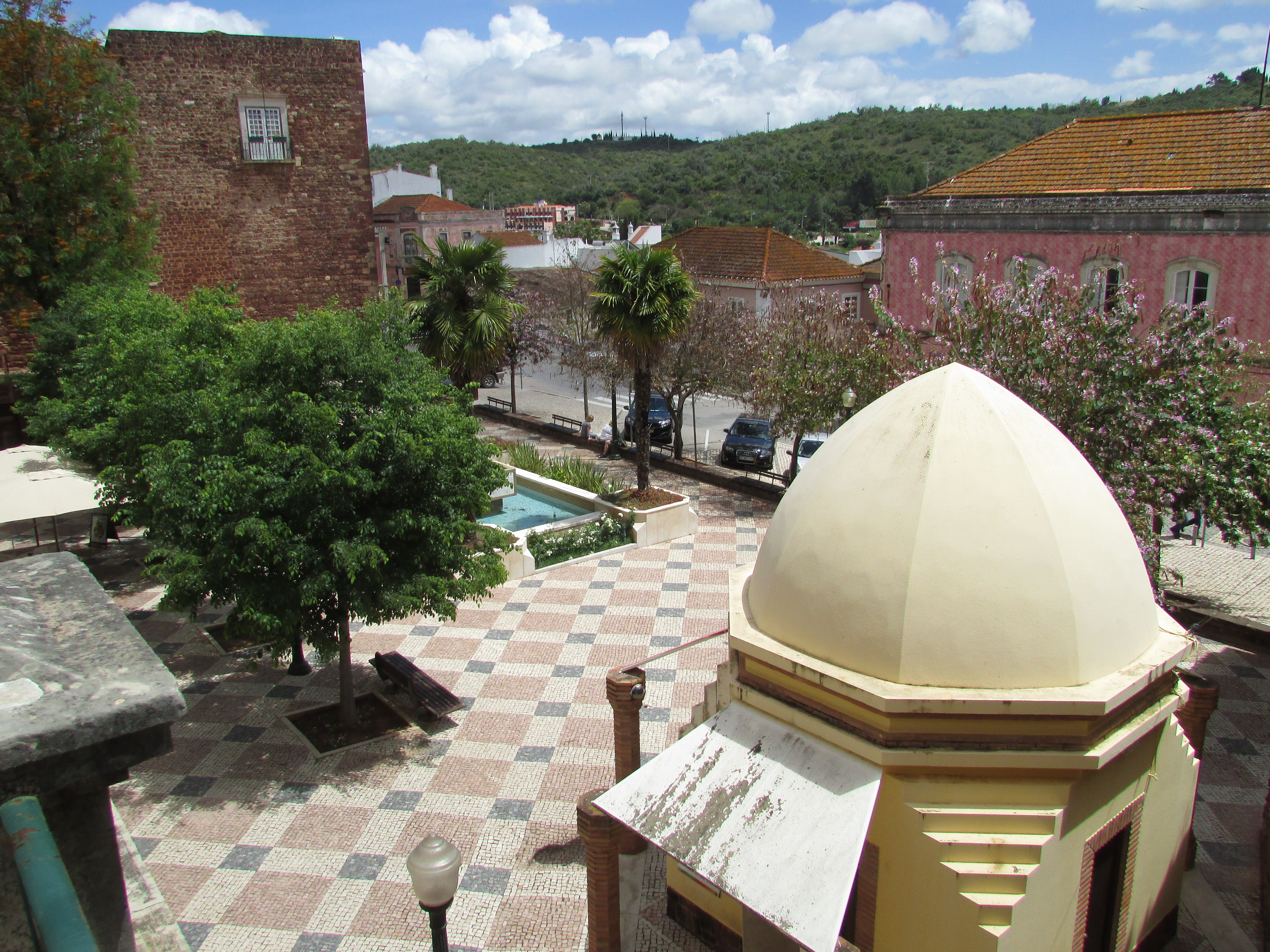

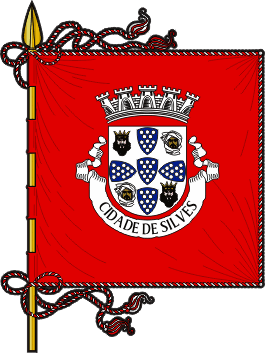
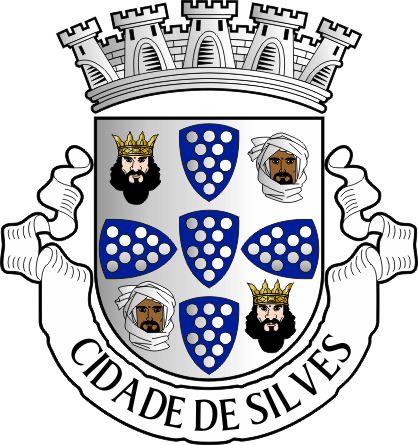
- Flag Coat of arms
- Interactive map of Silves
- Coordinates: 37°11′13″N 8°26′20″W
- Country: Portugal
- Region: Algarve
- Intermunic. comm.: Algarve
- District: Faro
- Parishes: 6

Government
  - President: Rosa Palma (CDU)

Area
  - Total: 680.06 km^{2} (262.57 sq mi)
- Elevation: 34 m (112 ft)
- Lowest elevation: 0 m (0 ft)

Population (2011)
  - Total: 37,126
  - Density: 54.592/km^{2} (141.39/sq mi)
- Time zone: UTC+00:00 (WET)
  - Summer (DST): UTC+01:00 (WEST)
- Website: www.cm-silves.pt

Silves (Portuguese pronunciation: [ˈsiɫ.vɨʃ]), officially the City of Silves (Portuguese: Cidade de Silves), is a city and municipality in the Portuguese region of Algarve, in southern Portugal. The population of the entire municipality of Silves in 2011 was 37,126, in an area of 680.06 km^{2}. Silves is the former capital of the Kingdom of the Algarve (1249–1910), a nominal kingdom within the Kingdom of Portugal (1139–1910), it is one of the oldest cities in Portugal and is of great historical importance. Silves is a member of Cittaslow.

== History ==
The region of Silves has been inhabited since the Palaeolithic, as attested by archaeological remains, including several menhirs. The river Arade, which was navigable in historical times, linked the hinterland to the open ocean and allowed the transport of produce and commerce.

In the Late Bronze Age, and especially during the Iron Age, the town was inhabited by related Indo-European peoples, such as the Cynetes and the Celtici. The town of Silves (Silpa or Silva) became notable during the times of Roman domination, when the region was incorporated into the Lusitania province. It was either a Celtici, Cynetes settlement, or Lusitanian Castro in pre-Roman times originally known as Cilpes. The Roman town of Cilpes may have been linked to Cerro da Rocha Branca, a pre-Roman settlement located approximately 1 km from the hill on which the present-day castle stands, and developed alongside the earlier settlement or grown out of it, eventually leading to the abandonment of the latter. Cilpes was connected to the wider Mediterranean trading network.

The current urban area of Silves likely housed an importante roman temple as early as the 2nd century AD as suggested by two massive marble capitals, inscribed stones, and various scattered artifacts. Also almost certainly dating from that period are the features of its street network, which still characterise the city's historic centre today. Thus, medieval Silves appears to have inherited two major thoroughfares from Roman urban planning, corresponding to the *cardo maximus* and the *decumanus* which intersect near the Silves Cathedral. The fact that coins bearing the name Cilpes were minted during the Roman period points to the significance of the settlement.

Silves was later part of the Visigothic Kingdom for over 300 years (418–c. 721). Various remains from this period, have been identified, ranging from capitals found in the Cathedral to what appears to be a Christian Visigothic basilica located in the northern area of the current Silves Castle.

After 713, when the Moors invaded Iberia, Silves became part of the Umayyad Emirate of Córdoba under the Arabic name of Shilb (شلب). In the 10th century it was one of the most important towns in western Al-Andalus. Silves became an independent taifa in 1027 under the rule of Ibn Mozaine and his son, who was dethroned in 1051 by al-Mu'tadid, the governor of Seville. Al-Mu'tamid ibn Abbad, the son of al-Mu'tadid and a famous poet, ruled the taifa of Silves until 1091. After the Almoravid conquest the town became Almohad in 1156.

In 1189, King Sancho I of Portugal conquered the town during the portuguese Reconquista, with the aid of Northern European crusaders. Sancho ordered the fortification of the city and built a castle, which is today an important monument of Portuguese heritage. At the time he also styled himself "By the Grace of God, King of Portugal and Silves (Dei Gratiæ, Rex Portugalliæ et Silbis). However, he soon lost the town again to the Almohads after sieges in 1190 and 1191. Periodic raiding expeditions were sent from Al-Andalus to ravage the Iberian Christian kingdoms, bringing back booty and slaves. The governor of Córdoba attacked Silves in 1191, and took 3,000 Christian slaves. In 1197, the city was attacked by German crusaders, but did not permanently change hands.

The town was finally taken from the last Muslim king Ibn Afan by Paio Peres Correia, Grand-Master of the Order of Santiago in 1242, in a joint action of the military orders with the portuguese King Afonso III, which culminated in the expulsion of the Moors from the Algarve, after the Alentejo and most of the coast had already fallen in 1238. The area, which may once have housed a roman or visigothic temple and later possiblly a mosque, was changed into Silves Cathedral (Sé Catedral). After the Reconquista, in 1266, the city of Silves was granted a charter (foral) similar to the one awarded to Lisbon, a fact that underscores its importance, particularly given the substantial role the city played in Portuguese maritime expansion during the ensuing centuries where the city of Silves experienced a period of prosperity.

Silves governed an extensive and prosperous territory, supported by a shipyard and a well-functioning river port. Its strategic position attracted influential residents, including the Casa do Infante Dom Henrique (House of Prince Henry the Navigator). Prince Henry was appointed mayor (alcalde) of the city, acquiring the privileges associated with the office and later becoming lord of the entire Algarve. According to historical and literary accounts, Silves also played an important role in the Portuguese Expansion through the involvement of individuals connected to the city. Among them was Diogo de Silves, who is credited with discovering the Azores in 1427. In addition, the bishop of Silves is said to have financed the outfitting of a caravel for one of the early expeditions along the west coast of Africa. The chronicler Gomes Eanes de Zurara is likewise believed to have lived in Silves, where he completed the Chronicle of the Discovery and Conquest of Guinea in 1453. Throughout the fifteenth and sixteenth centuries, the city experienced significant construction works, such as the extension of the road network, the building of important monuments,among them the churches of Nossa Senhora dos Mártires (Our Lady of the Martyrs) and Misericórdia (Our Lady of Mercy), large refurbishing works in the cathedral, as well as the Cruz de Portugal (Cross of Portugal). Various people from the *Casa do Infante* were present in Silves.João do Rego, Knight of the house of he prince Henry the Navigator and Gastão da Ilha linked to the settlement of Madeira are both buried in Silves Cathedral.

Silves declined in importance thereafter and was eclipsed in the region by Faro during the later colonial period. In 1491, the town of Silves was given to queen Eleanora by her husband, king John II of Portugal.

Statue of king Sancho I of Portugal in Silves, the king who reconquered the town for the Portuguese in 1189 and partially liberated southern Iberia from foreign rule.

In the 19th century, Silves became an important centre for the Portuguese cork industry. It had several cork factories, which together employed thousands of workers, a factor that also defined its structure in the 19th and in the first half of the 20th century. The industry's decline began after cork factory workers, instigated by communist and anarcho-syndicalist organizations resorting to coercion at gunpoint, supported the failed Portuguese general strike of 1934, after which the authoritarian Estado Novo regime retaliated by effectively closing down part of the industry in the town.

== Sights ==
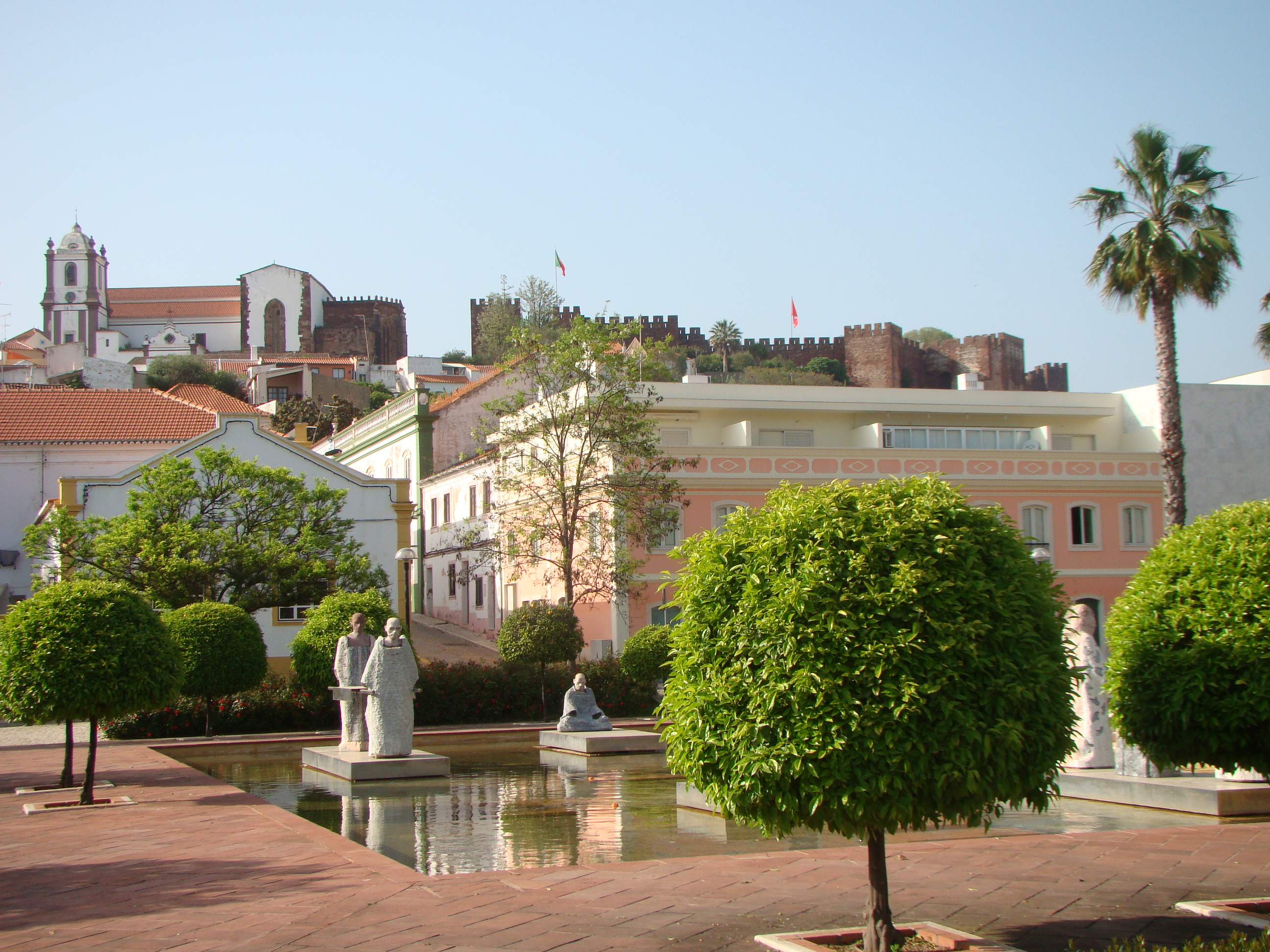
A view of the historical centre of Silves overlooking the Castle and Cathedral

Parts of the Almohad town wall, constructed from poured concrete, have been preserved, as well as the Almedina-gate (Porta de Loulé), built during the portuguese first dynasty period. Other sights include the Santa Misericórdia Church with a fine door in Manueline style (the main body of the church was built in 1727–28); a museum for cork and the production of bottle corks in a defunct factory which is now also a centre for cultural events called "Fábrica do Inglês (The Englishman's Factory); and the municipal museum (Museu Municipal de Arqueologia) with findings from the palaeolithic onwards.

The town is situated on a hill above the Arade River. Silves Castle is located on the top of the hill. It occupies ca. 12,000 m^{2}. Archaeological excavations have shown that the oldest buildings date back to the 8th century, the stratigraphy is almost 6 m deep and contains Iron Age remains as well. Silves Castle is widely regarded as the finest example of Arab military architecture in Portugal. The walls are made of red sandstone (grés de Silves) with a pisé-core and were heavily restored in the 1940s. Protruding towers of the albarra-type protect the Northern slope. After the Christian conquest, the castle served as the seat of the alcaide-mor (provincial governor) until the middle of the 16th century; afterwards the towers were used as a prison. There is evidence that portions of the Silves Castle were built re-using roman period structures (sections of Roman columns).

The exact date on which construction of the Silves Cathedral began remains uncertain. While some sources suggest that work may have begun as early as 1189, following the Christian conquest of Silves, most scholars believe that construction took place during the 13th and 14th centuries, under the orders of either King Afonso III or King Dinis. Further alterations were made during the 15th century and in subsequent periods. The Cathedral is generally regarded as one of the finest examples of Gothic architecture in southern Portugal. Reflecting its long construction history, the building features predominantly Gothic elements, alongside later additions in the Manueline and Baroque styles. Inside there are tombs of local bishops and dignitaries, as well as tombs of some of the Crusaders who fought here against the Moors all those years ago.

Igreja da Misericórdia de Silves is church across from the cathedral with specific door from the 16th century in the Manueline style. It is placed halfway up the building. Inside the church is huge altarpiece from the 17th century.

The Roman Bridge, or Ponte Romana Bridge holds a significant place in history. It is believed to have been built back when the Romans were in charge. This sturdy stone bridge stretches right over the Rio Arade, standing as a strong reminder of Roman architecture.

Opened in 1990, the Silves Municipal Archaeological Museum is located just below Silves Cathedral and Silves Castle. The museum is built over an 18-meter-deep, 4-meter-wide well that dates from the Almohad establishment of the city in the 11th century. The site was formerly occupied by a 19th-century residence before the building was demolished to form the museum.

Cruz de Portugal is a significant religious monument encapsulating Silves’ Christian history. It is crafted from white limestone and adorned with intricate carvings, its exact origins are unknown, with estimates placing it from the late 14th to the late 15th century. It is widely believed to have been gifted to Silves by D. Manuel I in 1499. The cross, standing at 3 meters and showcasing Christ crucified and a Pietà, is an example of Gothic style. Over the years, the cross has moved around the city, settling in its current 19th-century location in 1957, surrounded by a garden.

== Geography ==
The municipality is crossed by the Arade River, which was navigable in historical times and was key to the prosperity of the city of Silves. The waters of the river form the reservoirs of Arade and Funcho. The landscape of the municipality is generally hilly. To the south the municipality borders the Atlantic Ocean.

Silves is built on top of one of the largest aquifers in the south of Portugal, The Querença-Silves Aquifer, and has many orange groves, a fruit introduced by the Moors.

Silves is about 15 km (9.3 mi) north of the nearest stretch of Algarve coast, 20 kilometers northeast of Portimão and 62 km (39 mi) northwest of Faro International Airport by road.

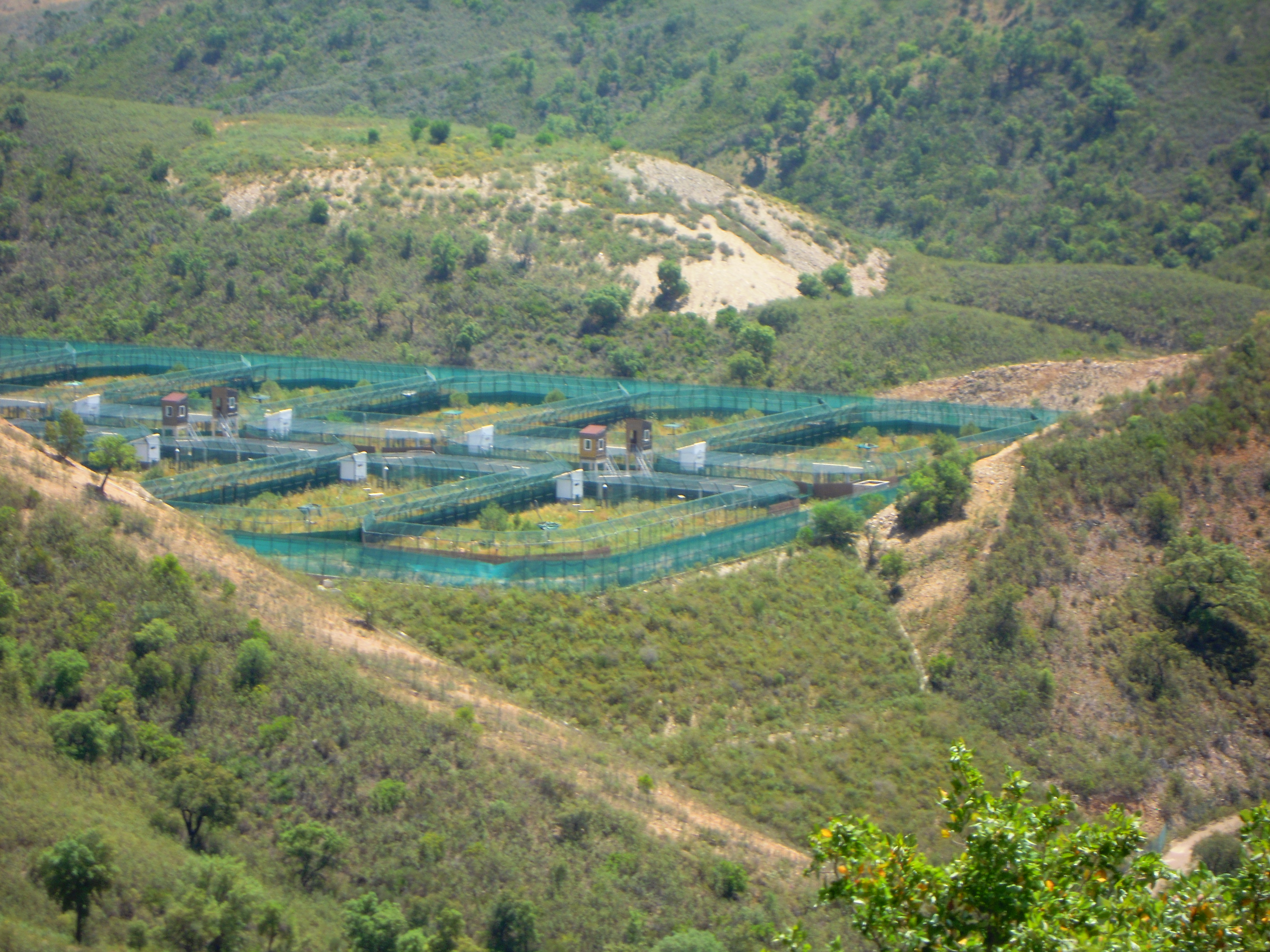
View of The Iberian lynx National Breeding Center in Silves municipality.

=== Climate ===
Silves has a Mediterranean climate (Köppen: Csa) with hot, very dry summers and mild, wet winters. The climate in the municipality of Silves is slightly more continentalized than the Algarvian coast, leading temperatures to be higher during the day and lower during the night in every season of the year. Temperatures in the winter vary between 17 °C (63 °F) during the day and 5–6 °C (41–43 °F) at night. Temperatures in the summer vary between 30–31 °C (86–88 °F) during the day and 15–17 °C (59–63 °F) at night.

Climate data for Tunes, Silves, 1980-1998, altitude: 56 m (184 ft)
Month	Jan	Feb	Mar	Apr	May	Jun	Jul	Aug	Sep	Oct	Nov	Dec	Year
Record high °C (°F)	23.5 (74.3)	27.0 (80.6)	27.6 (81.7)	30.5 (86.9)	34.0 (93.2)	37.6 (99.7)	42.8 (109.0)	39.2 (102.6)	41.0 (105.8)	33.0 (91.4)	29.2 (84.6)	26.5 (79.7)	42.8 (109.0)
Mean daily maximum °C (°F)	16.4 (61.5)	17.2 (63.0)	19.8 (67.6)	20.6 (69.1)	23.3 (73.9)	27.6 (81.7)	31.1 (88.0)	31.0 (87.8)	28.7 (83.7)	24.1 (75.4)	20.1 (68.2)	17.7 (63.9)	23.1 (73.7)
Daily mean °C (°F)	10.7 (51.3)	11.5 (52.7)	13.7 (56.7)	14.8 (58.6)	17.3 (63.1)	21.0 (69.8)	23.7 (74.7)	23.7 (74.7)	21.9 (71.4)	18.0 (64.4)	14.6 (58.3)	12.2 (54.0)	16.9 (62.5)
Mean daily minimum °C (°F)	4.8 (40.6)	5.9 (42.6)	7.5 (45.5)	8.9 (48.0)	11.3 (52.3)	14.4 (57.9)	16.4 (61.5)	16.4 (61.5)	15.1 (59.2)	11.9 (53.4)	8.9 (48.0)	6.7 (44.1)	10.7 (51.2)
Record low °C (°F)	−3.5 (25.7)	−3.8 (25.2)	−1.3 (29.7)	−1.0 (30.2)	3.5 (38.3)	6.0 (42.8)	7.0 (44.6)	8.0 (46.4)	6.0 (42.8)	1.0 (33.8)	−1.0 (30.2)	−3.5 (25.7)	−3.8 (25.2)
Average rainfall mm (inches)	65.9 (2.59)	55.3 (2.18)	31.4 (1.24)	43.5 (1.71)	31.1 (1.22)	5.5 (0.22)	1.8 (0.07)	2.8 (0.11)	21.0 (0.83)	49.6 (1.95)	109.3 (4.30)	106.4 (4.19)	523.6 (20.61)
Average rainy days (≥ 0.1 mm)	7.3	8.0	5.9	8.5	5.0	1.4	0.4	0.9	2.1	6.4	8.9	9.4	64.2
Source: Instituto Português do Mar e da Atmosfera

=== Human geography ===
Population of Silves Municipality (1801 - 2011)
Year	Pop.	±%
1801	10,509	—
1849	15,509	+47.6%
1900	29,598	+90.8%
1930	34,461	+16.4%
1960	33,368	−3.2%
1981	31,389	−5.9%
1991	32,924	+4.9%
2001	33,830	+2.8%
2004	34,909	+3.2%
2011	37,126	+6.4%

Administratively, the municipality is divided into 6 civil parishes (freguesias):

- Alcantarilha e Pêra
- Algoz e Tunes
- Armação de Pêra
- São Bartolomeu de Messines
- São Marcos da Serra
- Silves

== Economy ==
The activities linked to the secondary sector play a very important role in the municipality's economy. The cork and extractive industries are the main activities. The extractive industry emerged in the Metal Age and is linked to the beginning of an old tradition in metallurgy in the area, and the cork industry, implemented in the second half of the nineteenth century, triggered the economic and urban development of Silves. The agricultural area occupies about 10.3% of the municipality, being typical the cultivation of cereals for grain, nuts, citrus fruits including famed orange orchards, meadows, permanent pastures, fallow and olive groves. The municipality of Silves, where important part of the Algarve's citrus fruit production is concentrated, has created an Orange Route (Rota da Laranja), with different routes through the area. The Orange Route provides the visitor with several suggestions and agents that allow them to build a route that covers all stages of orange production, from the orchard to its packaging. This route has partnerships with some local producers who are available to welcome the public and provide several experiences in their orchards. There visitors can find gastronomic, cultural, landscape, accommodation, thematic itineraries, among other experiences. As for livestock, poultry, sheep and pigs stand out as the main species raised. Silves has a low forest density, little over 15% (15.1%) of the usable agricultural area, corresponding to 11,187 hectares. The city of Silves proper attracts many visitors due to its ancient castle and other urban attractions. The annual Medieval Fair in the historical neighborhoods of Silves near the castle is one of the biggest and most visited summer festivals in the Algarve. Near the coast, in Armação de Pêra and its beaches, tourism is very important during summertime in terms of number of visitors and revenue.

== Education ==
The city has kindergartens and elementary schools. Besides the local state-run secondary school, Deutsche Schule Algarve, a German international school, is also in the municipality of Silves, as well as a branch of the Instituto Piaget, a higher education institution.

== Culture and Sports ==
The city of Silves has museums, such as the Municipal Archaeological Museum and the Cork Museum.

- Municipal Museum of Archaeology of Silves
- Cork Museum of Silves - Fabrica do Inglês
- Mascarenhas Gregório Theatre of Silves
- Municipal Library of Silves

=== Sports ===
The city of Silves is home to a prominent sports club with a history spanning over a century: Silves Futebol Clube. Its home ground is the Doutor Francisco Vieira Stadium, which has a capacity of 3,000 spectators. There are other sports associations in the city, such as the Grupo Desportivo e Cultural do Enxerim (GDCE).

== Transport and Accessibility ==
- Quick access to the A22 motorway (Via do Infante)
- Silves Algarve line train Station
- Daily regional and national bus services

== Notable people ==
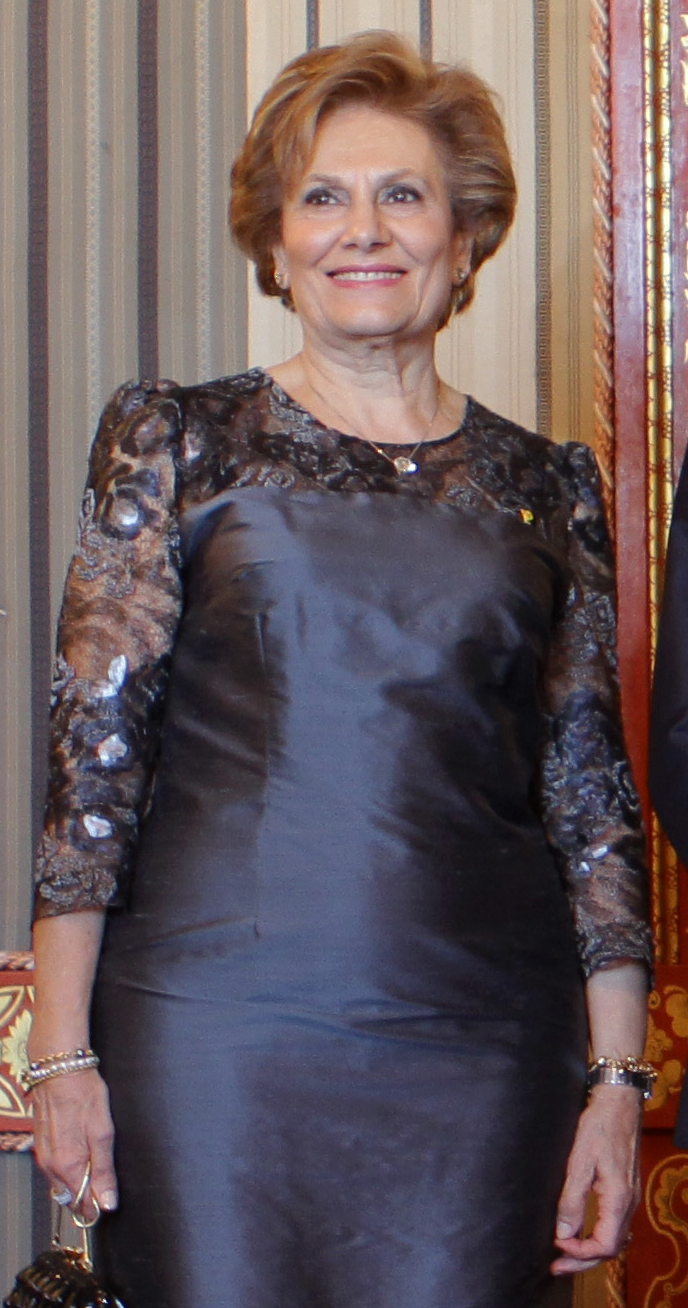
Maria Cavaco Silva, 2014

- Diogo de Silves (15th century), Portuguese explorer of the Atlantic who allegedly discovered the Azores islands in 1427.
- Muhammad ibn Ammar (1031–1086), Muwallad poet from Silves.
- Abu-l-Qasim Ahmad ibn al-Husayn ibn Qasi (died 1151), Sufi rebel leader and governor of Silves for the Almohads
- João de Deus (c.1190–1267), canon law jurist and priest
- João de Deus de Nogueira Ramos (1830–1896), poet and editor, wrote the didactic book Cartilha Maternal in 1876
- Corina Freire (1897–?1975?), Portuguese singer, actress and impresario.
- Bernardo Marques (1898–1962), painter, illustrator, graphic artist and caricaturist
- Maria Keil (1914–2012), artist and illustrator, known for her painting, drawing and tapestry
- José Vitoriano (1918–2006), politician and a major player in the 1974 overthrow of the Portuguese ruling regime
- Maria Cavaco Silva (born 1938), First Lady of Portugal from 2006 to 2016
- Amélia Veiga (born 1932), Portuguese-born Angolan poet and teacher
- Rui Bento (born 1972), football manager and former professional footballer with 321 club caps
- Aurea (born 1987), Portuguese soul singer originally from Santiago do Cacém, Alentejo, who grew up in Silves, Algarve

== Gallery ==
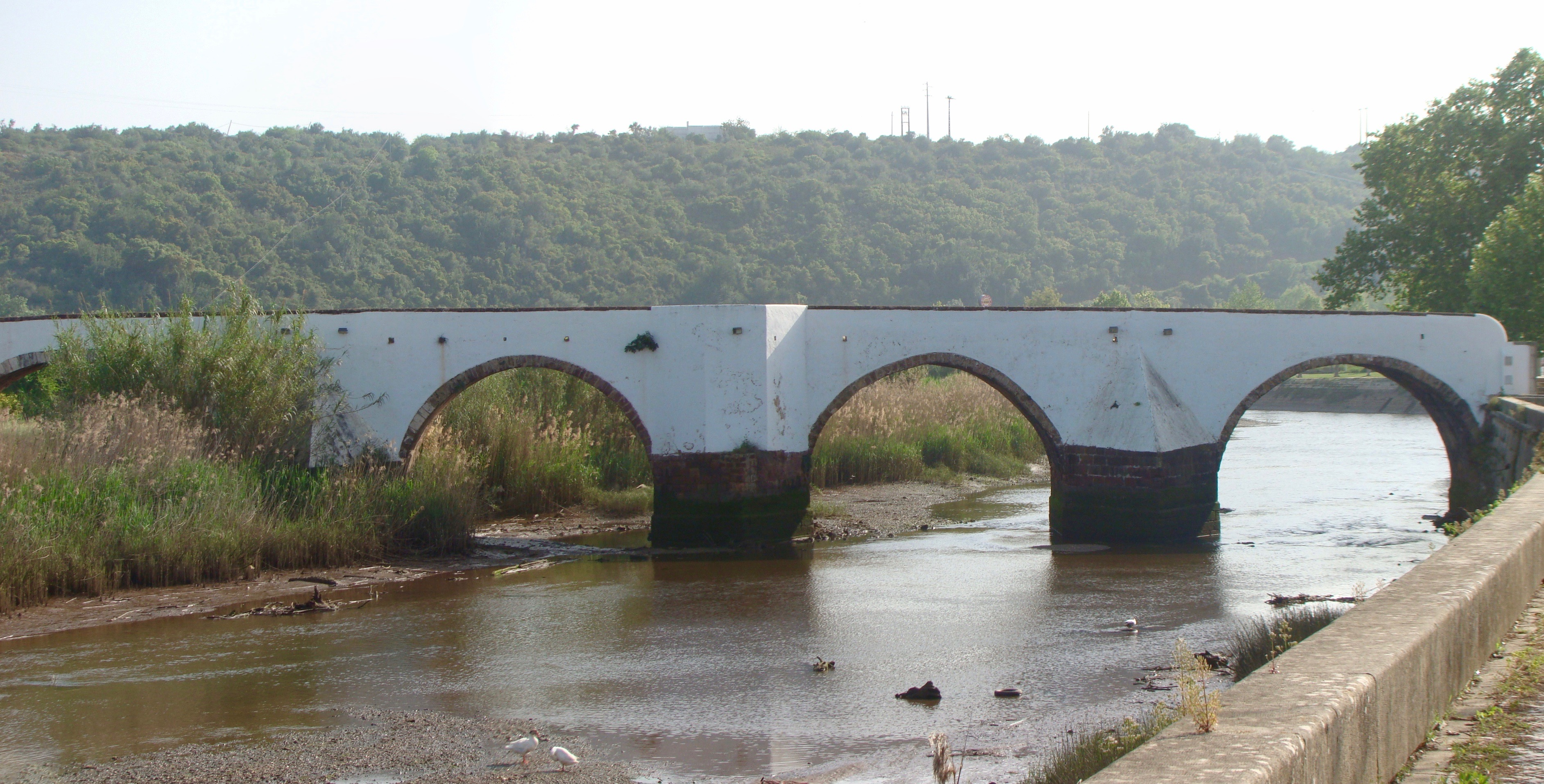
Silves's medieval bridge

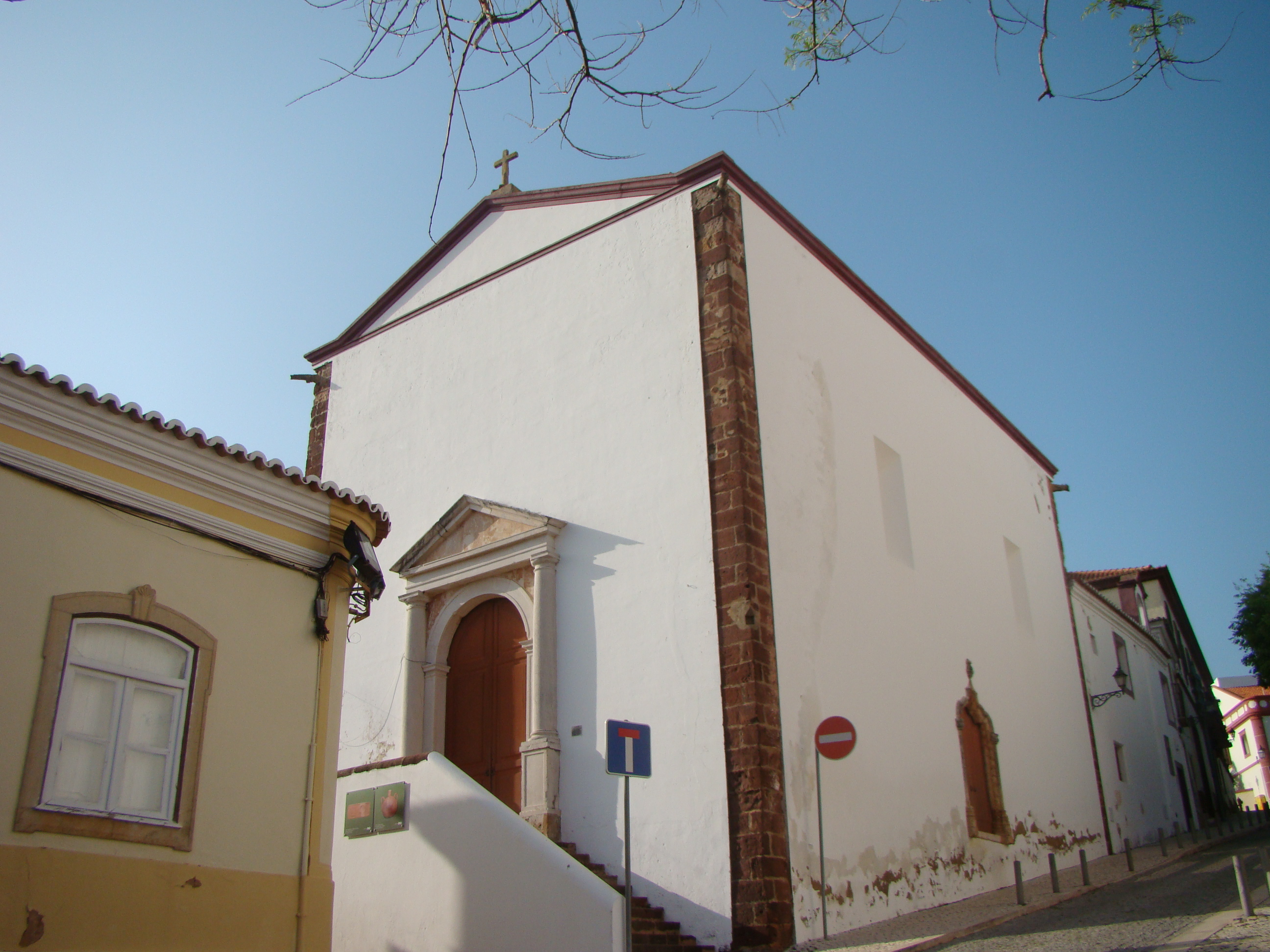
Misericórdia church

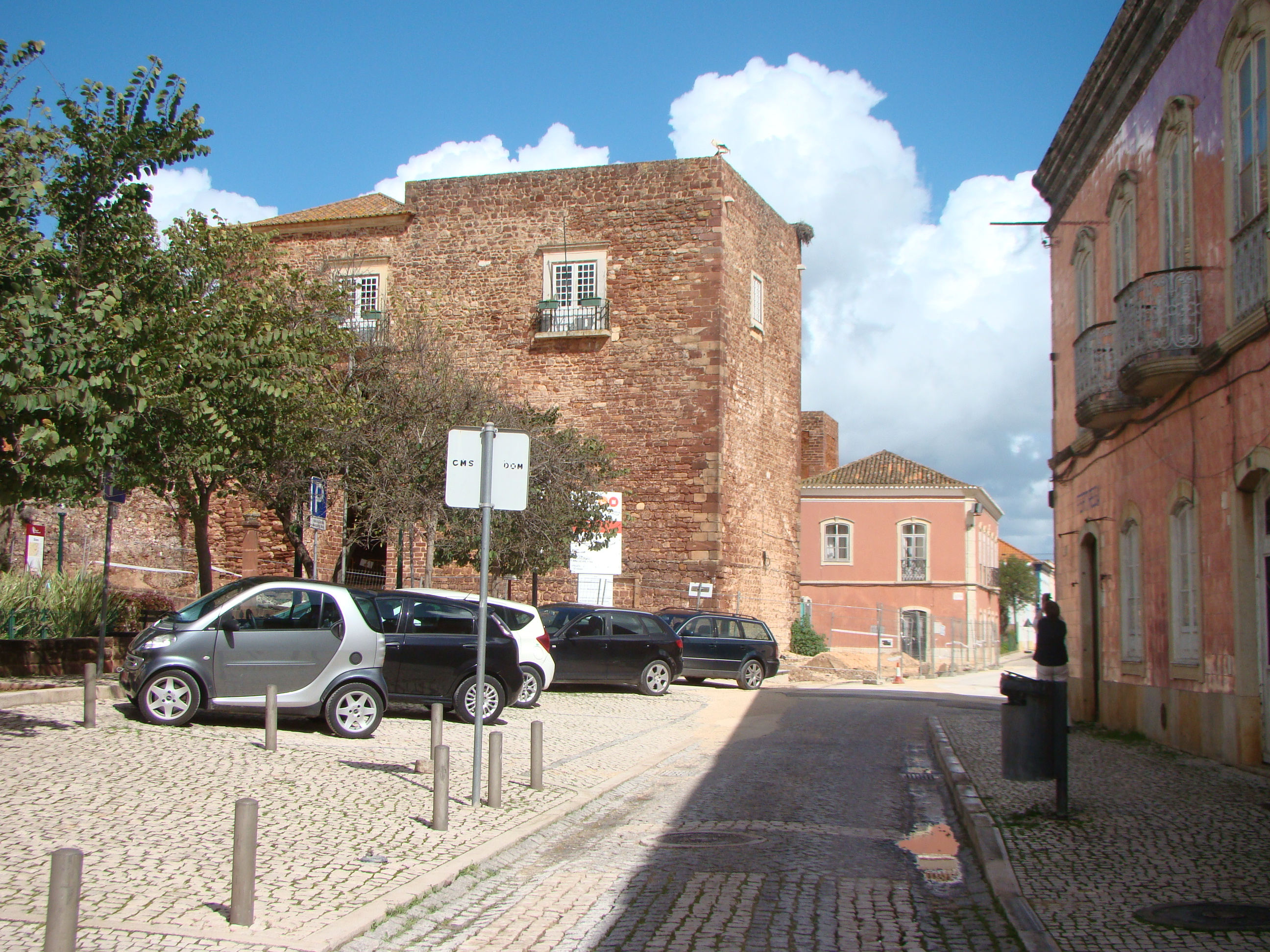
Francisco Vieira Street, close to the castle

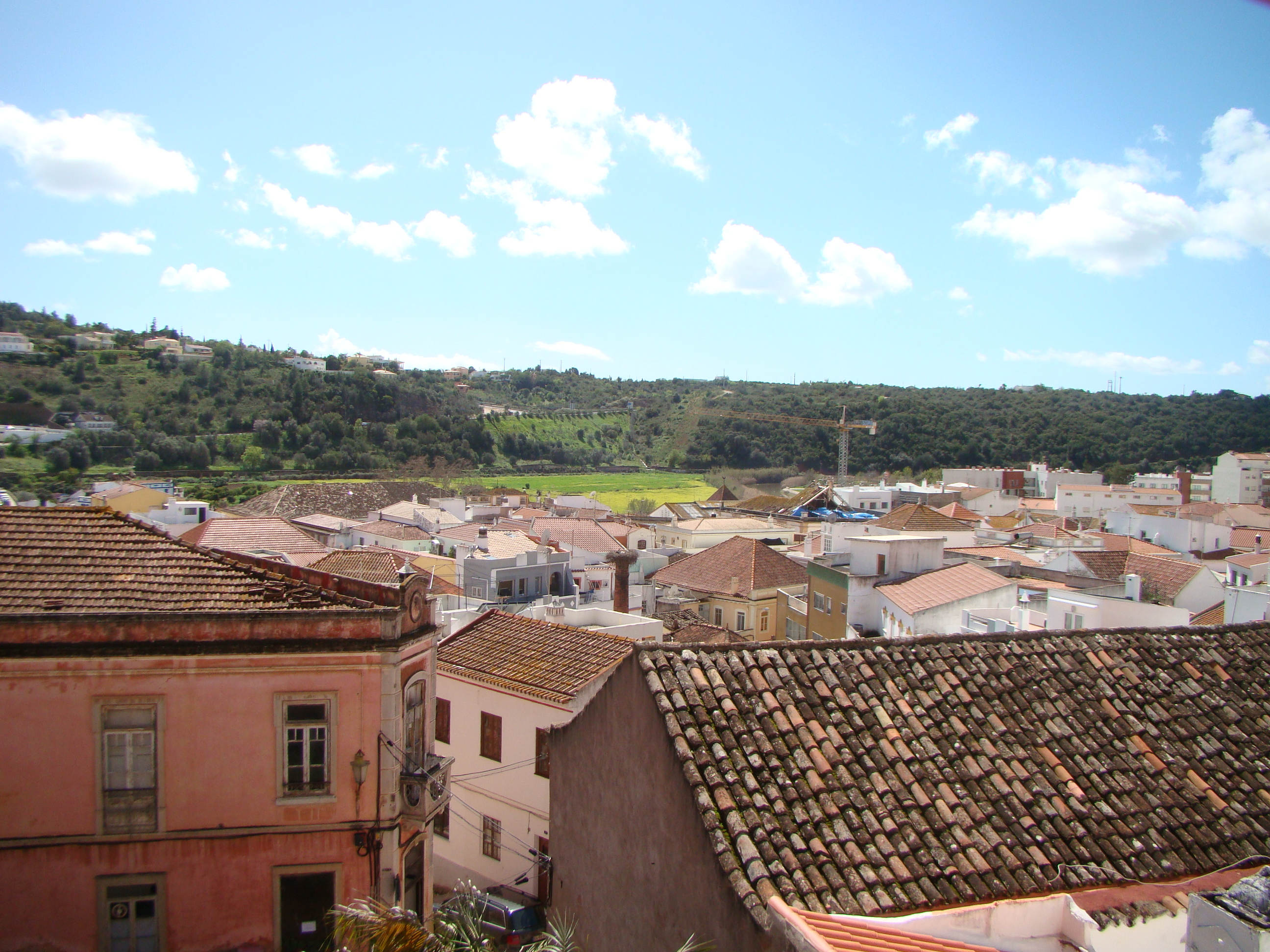
View of Silves from the Museum of Archaeology

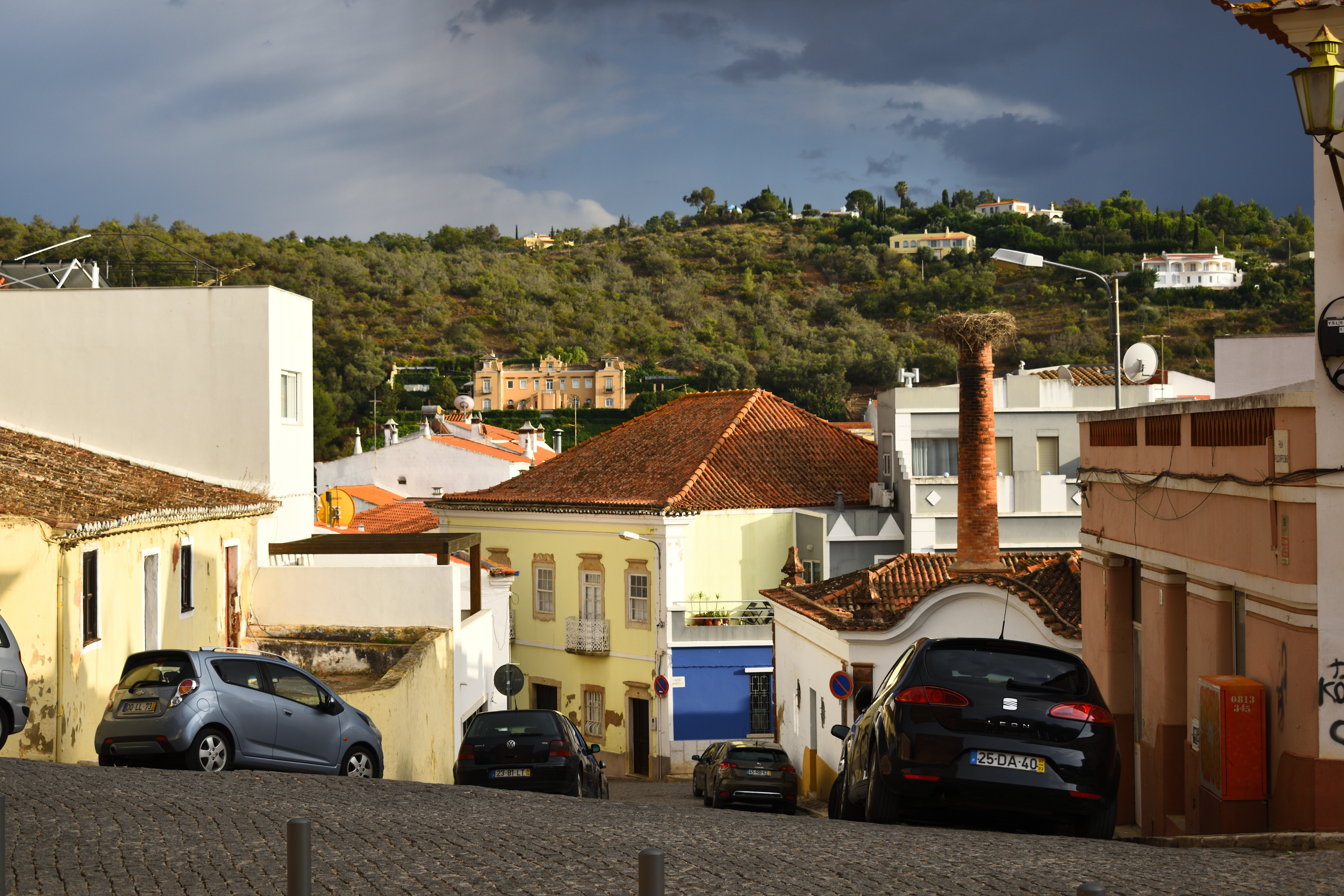
Silves seen from rua 25 de Abril

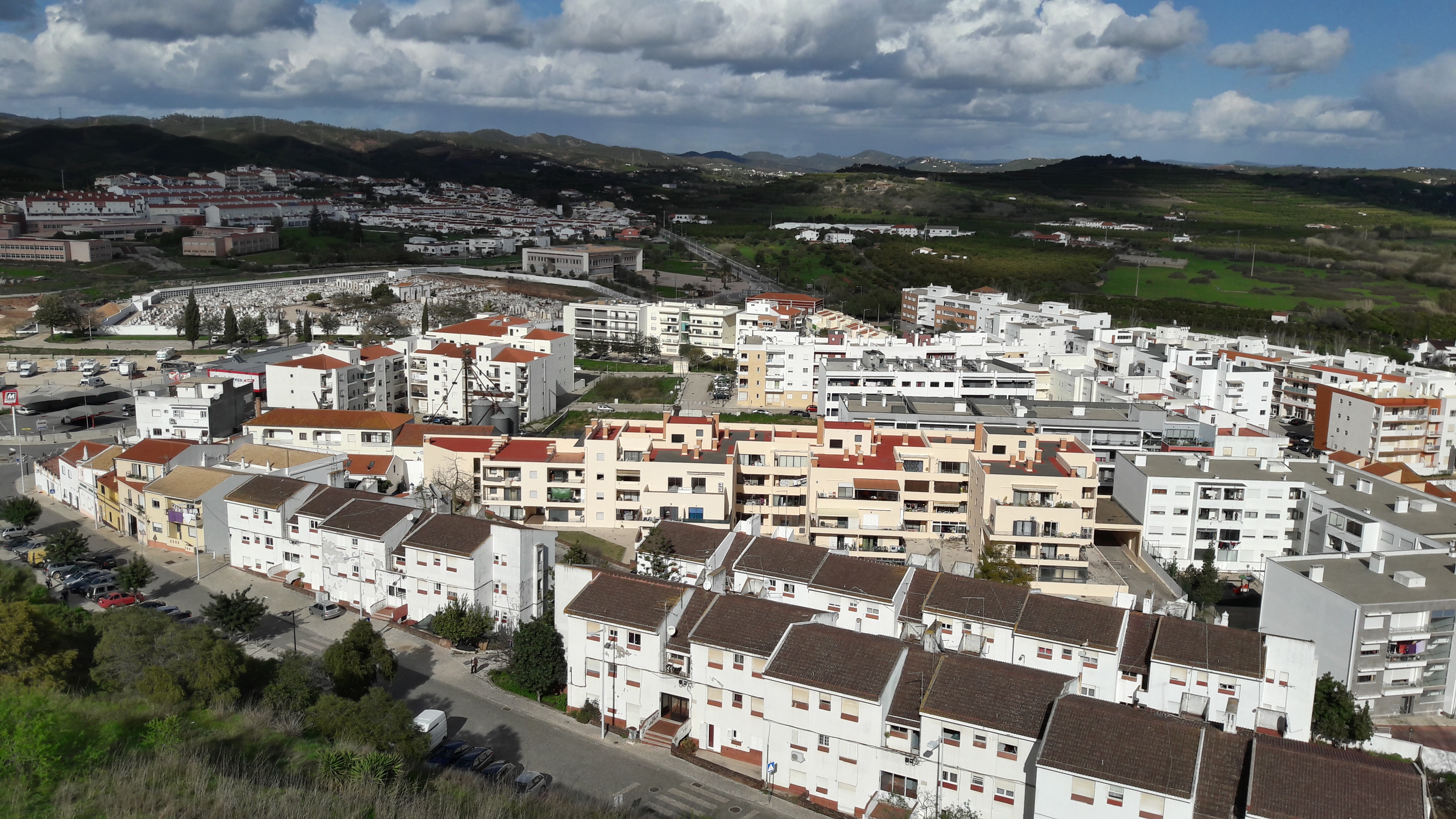
The new part of Silves seen from the Castle

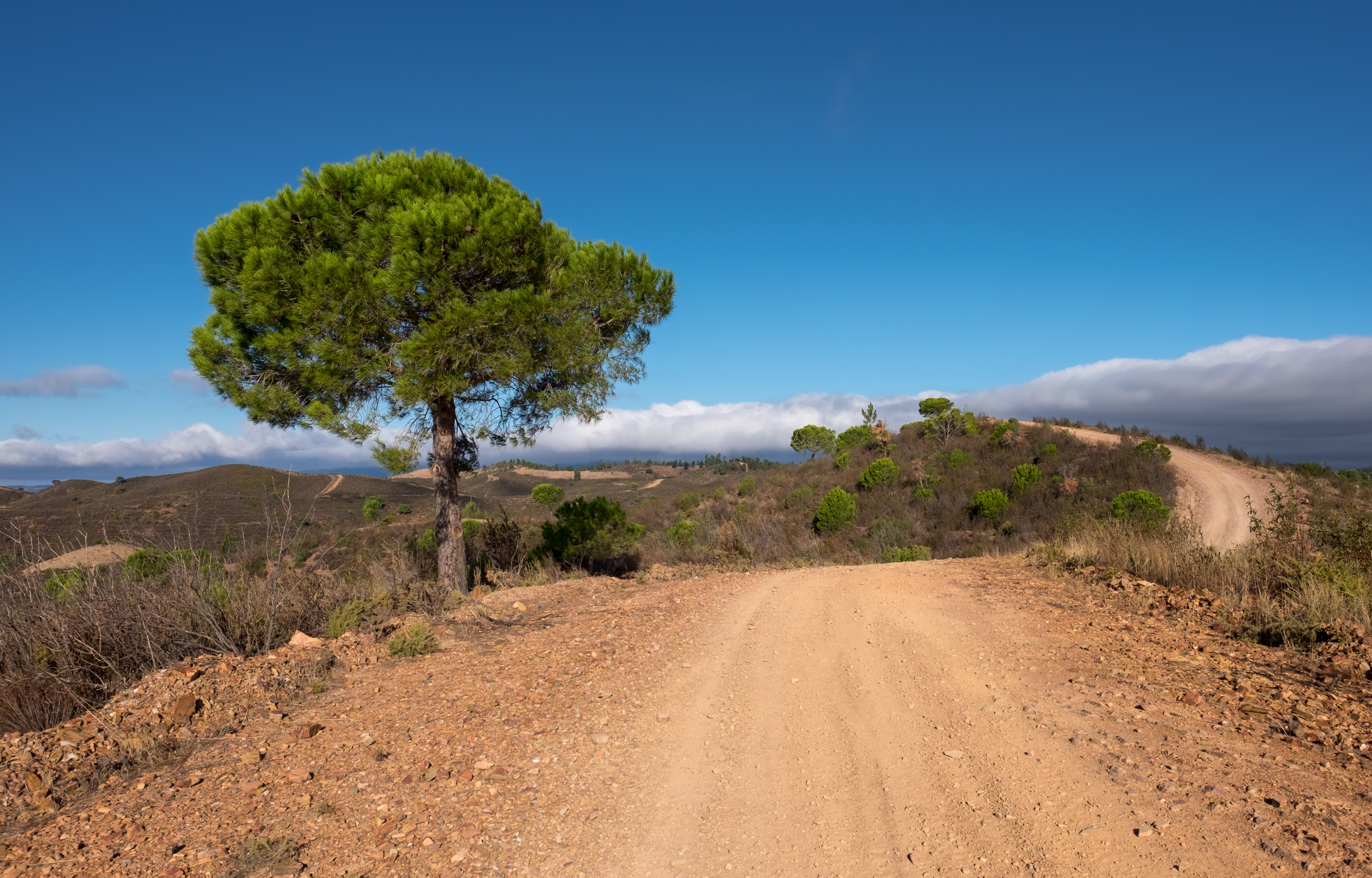
Via Algarviana footpath near Silves

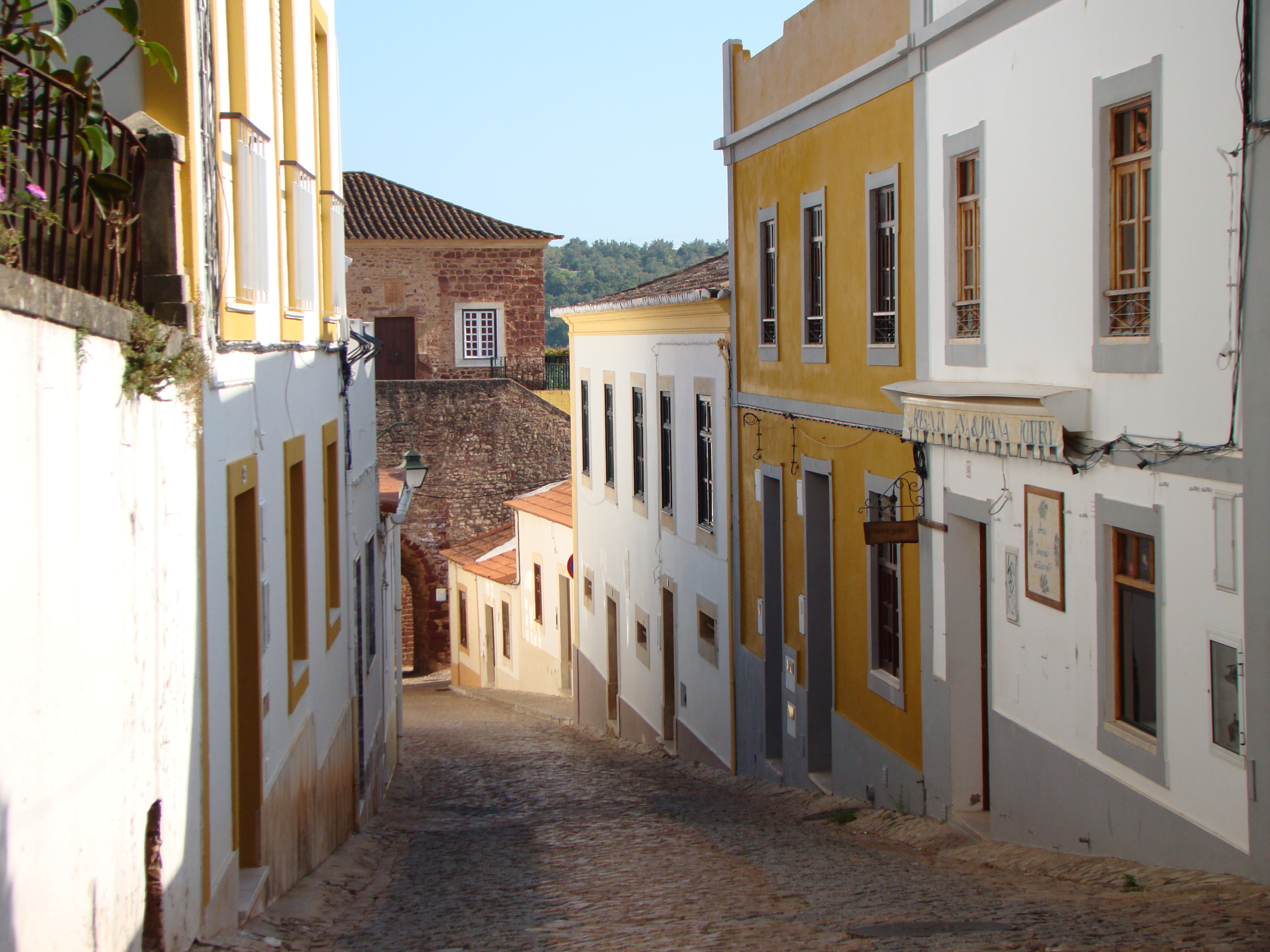
A street in Silves

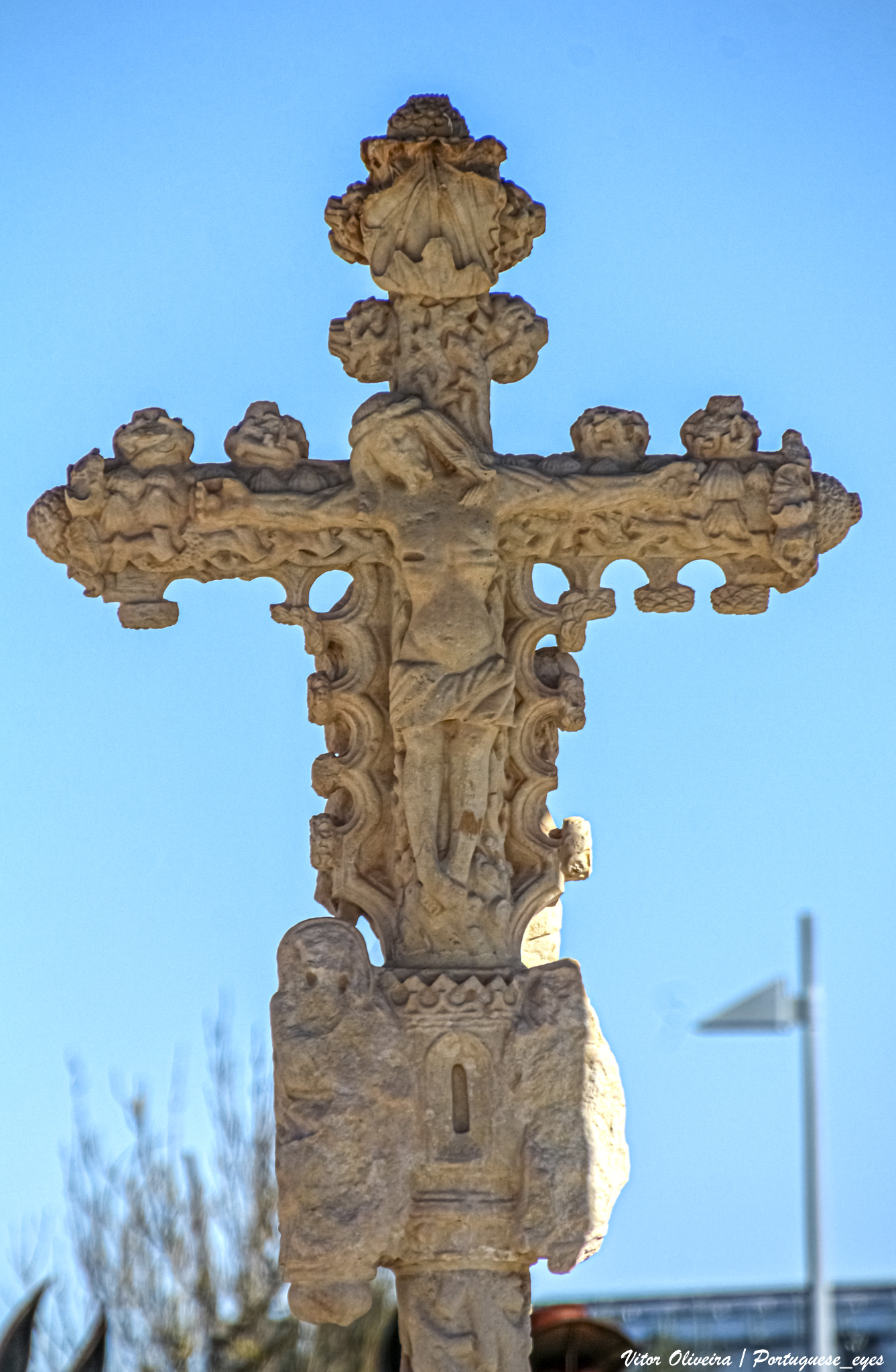
Cruz de Portugal - one of the symbols of the city of Silves

Arade River and the Old Bridge in Silves

The city's riverside park
