= Foy (name) =

Foy is a name of Irish, English and French origin. Saint Faith (French: Sainte-Foy) is a 3rd century Christian saint and martyr. The original Irish name was O'Fiaich meaning 'Raven'

People with the name and surname include:

== People with the name ==
=== Given name ===
- Foy D. Kohler (1908–1990), American diplomat
- Foy Vance (born 1974), Northern Irish musician
- Foy E. Wallace (1896–1979), American preacher

=== Surname ===
- Anne Foy (born 1986), British TV presenter
- brian d foy, American computer programmer and author
- Bryan Foy (1896–1977), American film director and producer who was earlier one of the "Seven Little Foys"
- Charles H. Foy (1809–1866), American Medal of Honor recipient
- Charley Foy (1898–1984), American actor
- Chris Foy (referee) (born 1962), English football referee
- Ciarán Foy, Irish film director
- Claire Foy (born 1984), English actress
- Darron Foy (born 1971), English cricketer
- Des Foy (born 1963), Irish rugby player
- Douglas I. Foy (born c. 1947), American environmentalist
- E. W. Foy (1937–2014), American basketball coach
- Eddie Foy, stage name of Edwin Fitzgerald (1856–1928), American actor, comedian, dancer and vaudevillian
- Eddie Foy Jr. (1905–1983), American character actor who was earlier one of the "Seven Little Foys"
- Eddie Foy III (1935–2018), American actor and film director
- Emma Foy (born 1989), New Zealand para-cyclist
- Frances Foy (1890–1963), American artist
- Fred Foy (1921–2010), American actor and voice performer
- Frederick Foy (1915–1995), English cricketer
- Gray Foy (1922–2012), American artist
- Humphrey Foy (1886–1956), American football player
- James Joseph Foy (1847–1916), Canadian lawyer
- Joe Foy (1943–1989), American baseball player
- John Foy (1882–1960), American track and field athlete
- Keith Foy (born 1981), Irish footballer
- Kylie Foy (born 1971), New Zealand field hockey player
- Lyla Foy (aka Wall), English singer/songwriter
- Laura Foy (born 1976), American television host
- Lydia Foy, Irish trans woman activist
- Mackenzie Foy (born 2000), American actress and model
- Magda Foy (1905–2000), "The Solax Kid", American child actor
- Mark Foy (businessman) (1865–1950), Australian retailer
- Mark Foy (footballer) (born 1973), New Zealand football player
- Mary Foy (disambiguation), several people
- Mathilda Foy (1813–1869), Swedish philanthropist
- Matt Foy (born 1983), Canadian ice hockey player
- Matthew Foy (born 1998), English footballer
- Maximilien Sébastien Foy (1775–1825), French military leader, statesman and writer
- Murray Foy (1935–1998), Australian actor and director
- Nathan Foy (born 1981), Welsh-born English blind cricketer
- Nathaniel Foy (died 1707), Irish religious figure
- Pat Foy (born 1965), Australian rules footballer
- Peter Foy (1925–2005), English stage-flight-effects specialist
- Philip Foy (1891–1957), Argentine first-class cricketer
- Robbie Foy (born 1985), Scottish footballer
- Robert W. Foy (1916–1950), American fighter pilot triple-ace during World War II
- Ronald A. Foy, U.S. Navy admiral
- Shirley Bunnie Foy (1936–2016), American musician
- Thomas P. Foy (1951–2004), American politician
- Tim Foy, British territorial governor
- Tom Foy (1879–1917), English music hall performer
- Tommy Foy (1910–1985), Irish football player
- Vincent Foy (1915–2017), Canadian Roman Catholic cleric and theologian
- Walter Frank Foy (1908–1993), Canadian politician

== Fictional characters ==
- Betty Foy, a fictional character in William Wordsworth's The Idiot Boy

== See also ==
- Foy (disambiguation)
- Foye, several people
- Sainte-Foy (disambiguation)
