= Monchique (disambiguation) =

Monchique is a town and municipality in southern Portugal. It may also refer to:

- Caldas de Monchique, a spa town in the Serra de Monchique
- Monchique Islet, Azores
- Monchique (parish), in Monchique Municipality
- Serra de Monchique, a chain of mountains in the western part of the Algarve region of Portugal
