= Marmelete =

- Civil parish
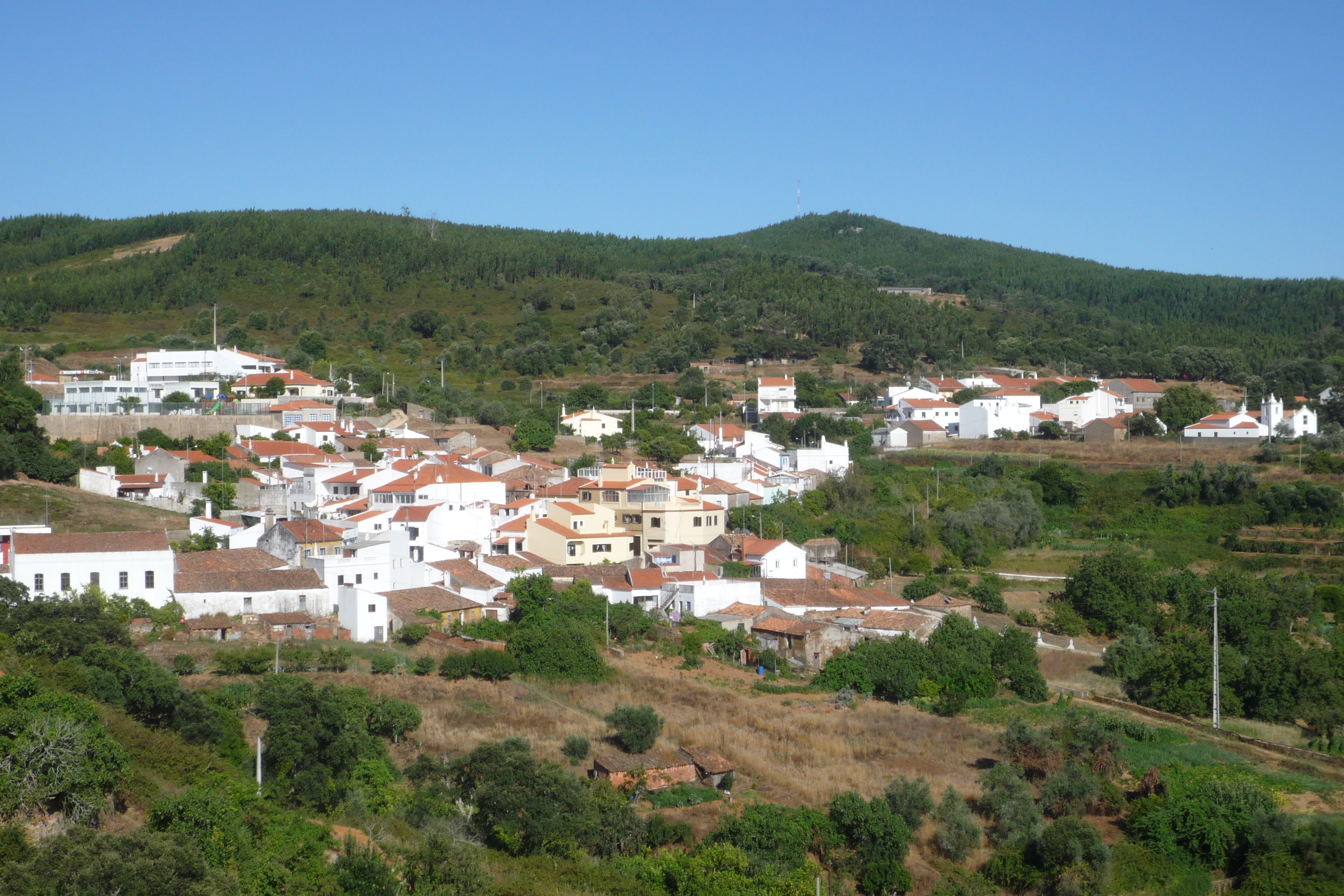

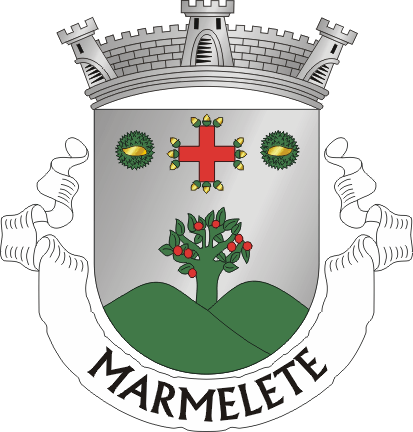
- Coat of arms

- Location in Portugal
- Coordinates: 37.311°N 8.669°W
- Country: Portugal
- Region: Algarve
- Intermunic. comm.: Algarve
- District: Faro
- Municipality: Monchique

Area
  - Total: 139.91 km^{2} (54.02 sq mi)

Population (2011)
  - Total: 787
  - Density: 5.63/km^{2} (14.6/sq mi)
- Time zone: UTC+00:00 (WET)
  - Summer (DST): UTC+01:00 (WEST)
- Website: http://www.jf-marmelete.pt/site/

Marmelete is a village and a freguesia (parish) in the concelho (municipality) of Monchique (Algarve, Portugal). The population in 2011 was 787, in an area of 139.91 km².

== Location ==
The village sits astride the N267 road which runs from Caldas de Monchique in the east to Aljezur in the west. The village is 59.2 miles (95.3 km) east by road of the region's capital of Faro, 9.2 miles (14.8 km) west of the town of Aljezur and 21.3 miles (34.3 km) north-east of the coastal town of Portimão. The village is in an area of mountains called Serra de Monchique. The parish is in the western half of the municipality of Monchique, and is in the heart of the Serra de Monchique and has an area of 146 km2. The parish is bounded on the north by the municipality of Breja, south by the municipalities of Lagos and Portimão, west by the municipality of Lagos and east by the parish of Monchique.

== Etymology ==
The name Marmelete derives from Sea and Milk. This name came about through a local folklore legend regarding the origins of the village. The legend tells the story of a ship sailing along the nearby coastline being caught in a fierce storm which caused the ship to capsize. The captain and his crew managed to escape to the coast near to Lagos, saving eight goats and timber from the ships structure. With what they had salvaged the captain and crew decided that they need to find somewhere to shelter and decided to head for the nearby Serra de Monchique. Eventually they came upon the area which is now the location of the village. The men settled there building shelters using the materials they had salvaged from the ship. Every morning members of the community would travel back down the mountain to the sea to catch fish, whilst the other took care of the goats and other livestock they had acquired. Many of the men began relationships with the local girls and some married and started families. After several years the shacks and shelters built by the captain and crew became a village with proper dwellings and they had gathered a considerable amount of livestock. There captain did not settle into the monotonous life on land and longed to go back to the sea. One day the captain went to the port of Lagos and by chance met an old seafaring acquaintance. The man owned a ship and hearing about the captain's predicament, he offered him a position of captain on his ship, but he could not employ any of his old crew. Since the captain could not take any of his old crew with him, he said goodbye to them with the following words: My friends, I leave you and do not know if I will ever return, but in my soul I'll keep this place and I name the village "Mar e Leite" (Sea and milk). Both elements that helped and sustained all of us over the many years. The sea, where we caught fish, and the milk of our goats. The remaining crewman took the captains words and inscribed them on a stone. Over time, the village name was modified until it developed to its present form of Marmelete

== Economy ==
Marmelete is a main supplier of cork, as well as a producer of Black Iberian pig. Beekeeping is also common in the hills surrounding the parish, resulting in an itinerant economy in wax and honey collected from local beehives. While a subsistence supply of wild fruits, berrys and vegetables continue to be produced in the district. The locals also produce a strong spirit called medronho, a traditional fruit Eau de vie from the fruit of the Medronho tree, Arbutus unedo, also called strawberry tree. Medronho trees grow wild in the poor soils of the hilly slopes of Serra de Monchique.

== Main sites ==
- Saint Anthony Chapel
- Parish Church of Our Lady of the Incarnation
