= Bob Bissonnette =

Canadian ice hockey player (1981-2016)

- Bissonnette applying hockey tape to a guitar, as part of a shoot for the video "Mettre du tape su' ma palette" from his album Recrue de l'année.

Personal information
- Born: 27 April 1981 Caracas, Venezuela
- Died: 4 September 2016 (aged 35) Flatlands, New Brunswick, Canada
- Musical career
- Instrument: vocals
- Website: bobbissonnette.com

Sport
- Sport: ice hockey
- Team: Hull Olympiques; Acadie–Bathurst Titan; Florida Everblades; Summum Chiefs

Roberto "Bob" Bissonnette (27 April 1981 – 4 September 2016) was a Canadian ice hockey player, as well as a singer known for his sports-themed songs and former co-owner of the Québec Capitales professional baseball team.

== Sports career ==
Bissonnette was born in Caracas, Venezuela, in 1981, but grew up in Sainte-Foy, now a district of Quebec City. He was picked for the Quebec Major Junior Hockey League (QMJHL) in Hull Olympiques becoming team captain. In 2001–2002, he was transferred to Acadie–Bathurst Titan. From 2002 onwards he played in various hockey leagues. Teams he played for include Patriots of Université du Québec à Trois-Rivières, Florida Everblades, Caron and Guay of Pont-Rouge, Summum Chiefs of Saint-Jean-sur-Richelieu and others. He stopped playing competitively in 2010.

			Regular season					Playoffs
Season	Team	League	GP	G	A	Pts	PIM	GP	G	A	Pts	PIM
1998-1999	Hull Olympiques	QMJHL	44	7	6	13	183	23	4	4	8	33
1999-2000	Hull Olympiques	QMJHL	60	5	15	20	318	15	1	1	2	22
2000-2001	Hull Olympiques	QMJHL	71	31	31	62	381	3	1	1	2	4
2001-2002	Hull Olympiques	QMJHL	44	16	22	38	248	-	-	-	-	-
2001-2002	Acadie–Bathurst Titan	QMJHL	22	3	7	10	130	13	2	3	5	27
2002-2003	UQTR Patriotes	CIS	20	9	12	21	54	-	-	-	-	-
2003-2004	Florida Everblades	ECHL	13	0	0	0	33	-	-	-	-	-
2003-2004	Pont-Rouge Caron & Guay	LHSMQ	18	2	3	5	111	9	0	1	1	6
2004-2005	Donnacona Métro Gagnon	QSCHL-AAA	33	10	20	30	158	5	1	2	3	14
2005-2006	Shawinigan Xtrême	QSCHL-AAA	13	1	4	5	56	16	0	0	0	117
2006-2007	Rivière-du-Loup CIMT	QSCHL-AAA	2	0	1	1	6	-	-	-	-	-
2006-2007	Chandler Gaillard	LHSEQ	14	7	9	16	85	4	1	1	2	54
2007-2008	Summum-Saint-Jean-sur-Richelieu Chiefs	LNAH	18	1	2	3	123	-	-	-	-	-
2008-2009	Grand-Caraquet Acadiens	LHSCN	13	7	12	19	109	3	3	2	5	24
2009-2010	Grand Falls-Windsor Cataracts	WCSHL	6	0	1	1	45	-	-	-	-	-

== Singing career ==
In 2010, Bissonnette launched a singing career releasing three albums, Recrue de l'année (2010), Les Barbes de séries (2012) and Rockstar (2014). He had a number of singles including "Mettre du tape su' ma palette" (2010), "Recrue de l'année" (2010), "Y sont toutes folles" (2010), "Hockey dans rue" and "Chris Chelios" (2011), "Les Barbes de séries" and "La machine à scorer" (2012) and "Rockstar" (2014). He operated completely independently as a musician; he had no contract with any record company, nor did he receive any subsidies from the Canadian government.

== Other ventures ==
Bissonnette was also a minority co-owner of Québec Capitales. He performed musical numbers for five years during the regular season of Capitales.

== Death ==
On 4 September 2016, Bissonnette died in a helicopter accident in the Flatlands, near Campbellton, New Brunswick, Canada. The crash also resulted in the death of the pilot, Frédérick Décoste. Michel Laplante, president of the Capitales, was injured in the incident.
