= Foy =

Foy may refer to:

== Places ==
- Foy, Belgium
- Foy, Herefordshire, England
- Fowey, Cornwall, England (pronounced "Foy")
- Foy Provincial Park, Ontario, Canada
- Slieve Foy, a mountain near Carlingford, County Louth, Ireland

== Other uses ==
- Foy (name), including a list of people and fictional characters with the name
- Foy & Gibson, also known as Foy's, an early Australian department store chain
- Mark Foy's, a Sydney, Australia, department store
- Prix Foy, a French horse race

== See also ==
- Foi (disambiguation)
- Sainte-Foy (disambiguation)
