= Fóia =

Mountain in Portugal

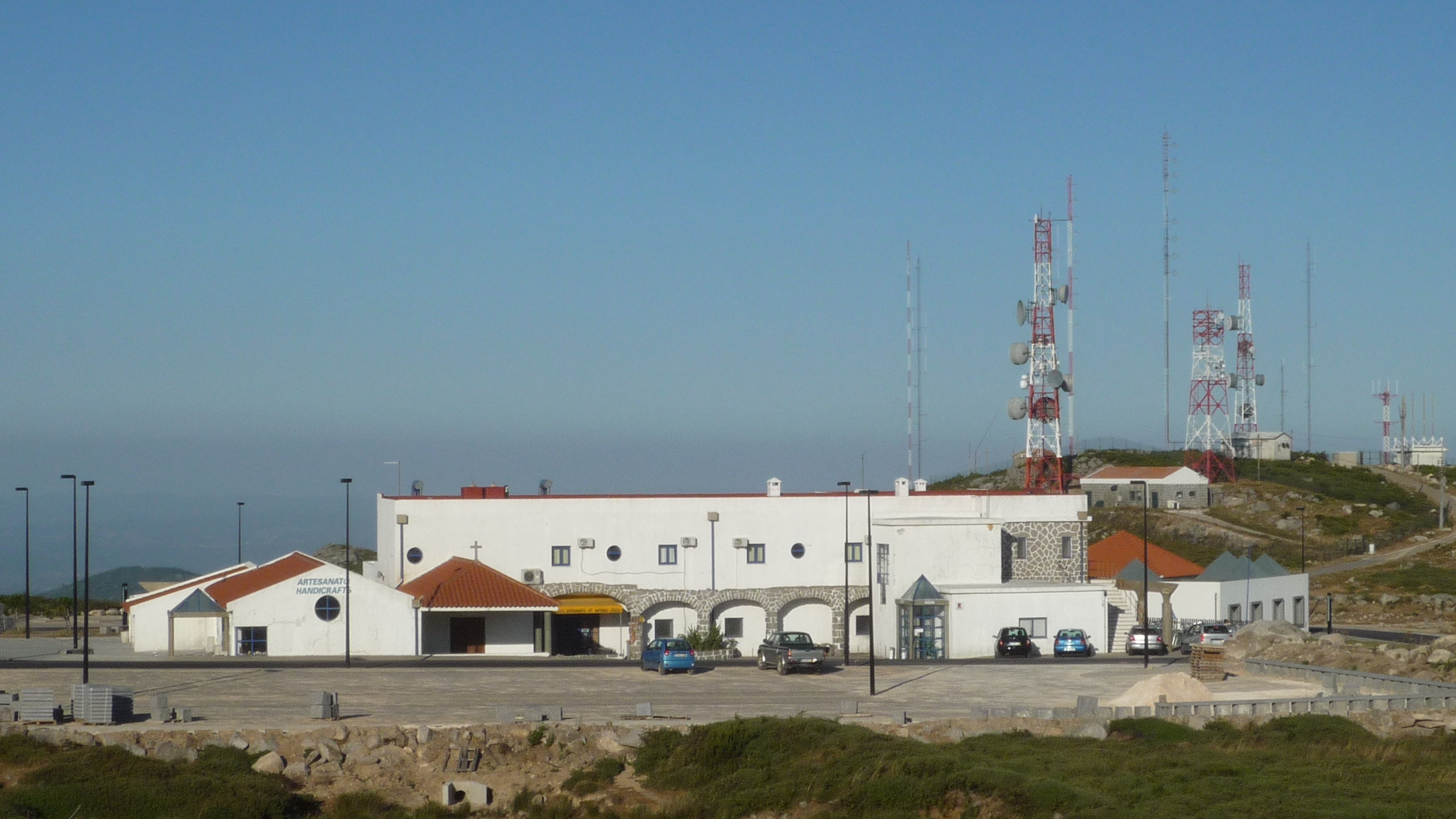
The summit

With an elevation of 902 metres (2,959 ft) and a topographic prominence of 739 metres (2,425 ft), Fóia is the highest mountain of Algarve, Portugal. It is part of the Serra de Monchique range and is located at 37.314795°N 8.596244°W within Monchique parish.

There is a paved road right to the summit which is topped by several telecommunication facilities including the Radar Station Number 1 of the Portuguese Air Force. On a clear day the Atlantic Ocean is visible.

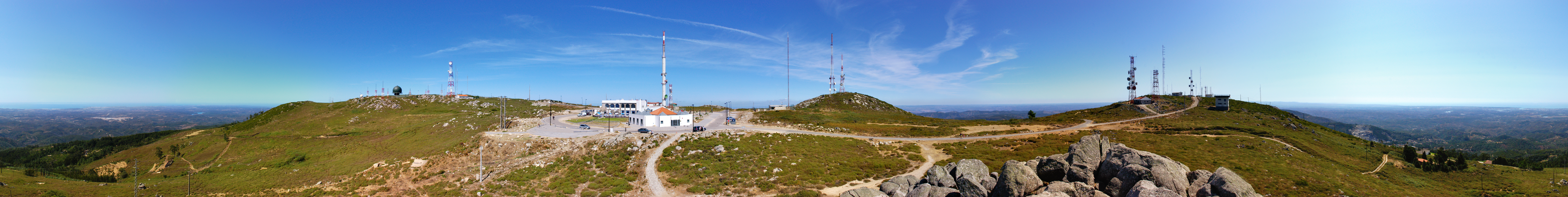
Panorama view from the mountain Fóia
