= Foia =

Foia or FOIA may refer to:

- Freedom of Information Act (FOIA), several laws in various countries
- Fóia, the highest mountain of Algarve, Portugal
- Foia Foia language, of Papua New Guinea

== See also ==
- FOI (disambiguation)
