= Fois =

Fois may refer to:

- Foix, France
- Giovanni Melis Fois (1916–2009), Italian Roman Catholic prelate
- Marcello Fois (born 1960), Italian writer
- Valentino Fois (1973–2008), Italian cyclist

== See also ==
- FOI (disambiguation)
