= Foye =

Foye is an English surname. Notable people with the surname include:

- Arthur Foye (1893–1976), American Certified Public Accountant
- Bruce Foye (born 1950), Australian rugby league footballer
- Hope Foye (1921–2025), American folk singer
- K'wan Foye, American author of urban fiction
- Michael Foye, 18th-century Irish sculptor
- Pat Foye (born 1957), American lawyer
- Randy Foye (born 1983), American basketball player
- William Foye (1716–1771), political figure in Nova Scotia

== See also ==
- Foyesade "Foye" Oluokun (born 1995), American footballer
