= Alferce =

- Civil parish
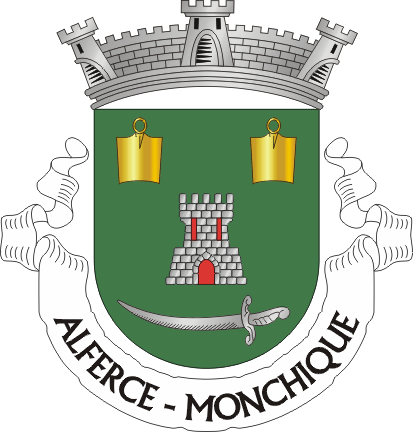
- Coat of arms

- Location in Portugal
- Coordinates: 37.333°N 8.490°W
- Country: Portugal
- Region: Algarve
- Intermunic. comm.: Algarve
- District: Faro
- Municipality: Monchique

Area
  - Total: 96.12 km^{2} (37.11 sq mi)

Population (2011)
  - Total: 441
  - Density: 4.59/km^{2} (11.9/sq mi)
- Time zone: UTC+00:00 (WET)
  - Summer (DST): UTC+01:00 (WEST)
- Website: http://www.jf-alferce.pt/

Alferce is a freguesia (parish) in the Monchique Municipality (Algarve, Portugal). The population in 2011 was 441, in an area of 96.12 km².

Lies in this area remains of a medieval fortress from Muslim rule in Portugal known in Islamic sources ( Hillah Sirah of Ibn Abbar & others ) as حصن المرجيق - Monchique fortress.

The fortress was captured in 1144 by the followers of Ibn Qasi from the Almoravids. Less than a century later, it became part of the Kingdom of Portugal who seized the fortress from Ibn Mahfuz (Aben Mahfot in Spanish sources), then leader of the Algarve region & Niebla (Dawlah Islam fil Andalus - Abdullah bin Inan).
