= Monchique =

- Municipality
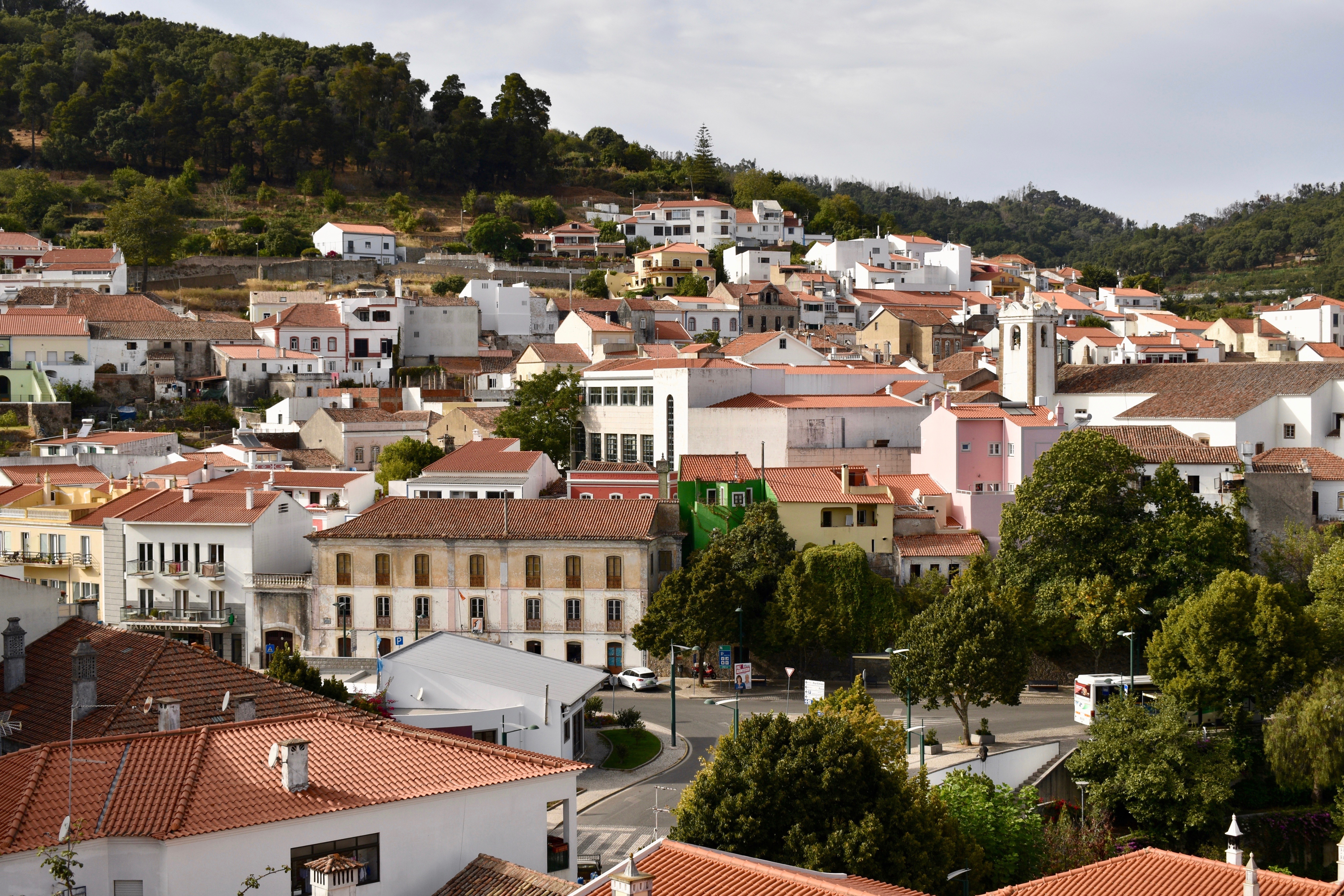
- Panoramic view of Monchique

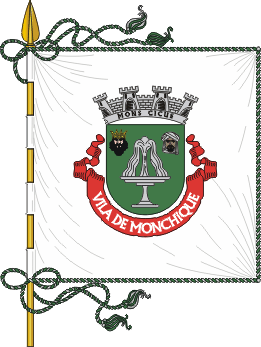
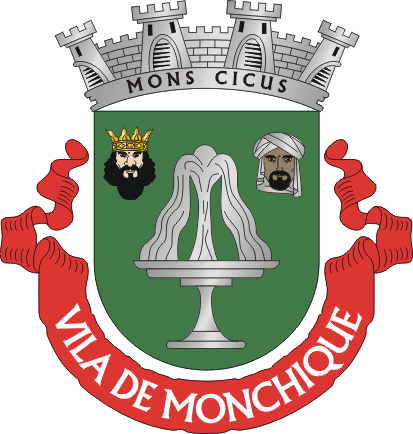
- Flag Coat of arms
- Interactive map of Monchique
- Location in Portugal
- Coordinates: 37°19′N 8°36′W
- Country: Portugal
- Region: Algarve
- Intermunic. comm.: Algarve
- District: Faro
- Parishes: 3

Government
  - President: Paulo Jorge Duarte Alves (PS)

Area
  - Total: 395.30 km^{2} (152.63 sq mi)

Population (2011)
  - Total: 6,045
  - Density: 15.29/km^{2} (39.61/sq mi)
- Time zone: UTC+00:00 (WET)
  - Summer (DST): UTC+01:00 (WEST)
- Local holiday: Ascension Day date varies
- Website: http://www.cm-monchique.pt

Monchique (Portuguese pronunciation: [mõˈʃikɨ]) is a municipality of southern Portugal, in Faro District (province of Algarve). The population in 2011 was 6,045, in an area of 395.30 km^{2}.

The Municipality of Monchique is situated in the Serra de Monchique and together with the town of Monchique is a tourist destination. Attractions include a historic town centre, views from the two peaks of Foia and Picota, hiking, bird watching and biking. There are hot sulfur springs, with baths and health spas 6 kilometres (4 mi) south in 'Caldas de Monchique' (Spring of Monchique). Eucalyptus, cork oak, oranges, lemons, honey, olive oil, chestnuts, scissor chairs made from chestnut wood, black pork and black pork ham and sausages are the chief products. There are several small industries producing tourist artifacts that are sold in local shops, and medronho, a local brew made from distilled medronho berries (Arbutus/Strawberry Tree), is produced.

== Parishes ==
Administratively, the municipality is divided into 3 civil parishes (freguesias):

- Alferce
- Marmelete
- Monchique

== Climate ==
Monchique has a Mediterranean climate with warm to hot summers and mild, wet winters. Due to its altitude and location, right between the valley formed by the Serra de Monchique, precipitation in the winter is much larger than anywhere else on the Algarve. Its position on the southwest corner of Portugal gives it very mild temperatures in the winter, especially for its altitude.

Climate data for Monchique, 1954-1980 normals, 1981-2021 precipitation, altitude: 465 m (1,526 ft)
| Month | Jan | Feb | Mar | Apr | May | Jun | Jul | Aug | Sep | Oct | Nov | Dec | Year |
|---|---|---|---|---|---|---|---|---|---|---|---|---|---|
| Record high °C (°F) | 21.5 (70.7) | 24.0 (75.2) | 23.5 (74.3) | 28.5 (83.3) | 33.5 (92.3) | 34.5 (94.1) | 38.0 (100.4) | 35.9 (96.6) | 36.0 (96.8) | 31.5 (88.7) | 26.0 (78.8) | 23.5 (74.3) | 38.0 (100.4) |
| Mean daily maximum °C (°F) | 12.6 (54.7) | 13.0 (55.4) | 14.5 (58.1) | 16.8 (62.2) | 20.0 (68.0) | 23.2 (73.8) | 27.0 (80.6) | 27.3 (81.1) | 24.8 (76.6) | 20.3 (68.5) | 15.7 (60.3) | 13.1 (55.6) | 19.0 (66.2) |
| Daily mean °C (°F) | 9.8 (49.6) | 10.0 (50.0) | 11.2 (52.2) | 12.9 (55.2) | 15.6 (60.1) | 18.4 (65.1) | 21.4 (70.5) | 21.8 (71.2) | 20.2 (68.4) | 16.6 (61.9) | 12.6 (54.7) | 10.2 (50.4) | 15.1 (59.1) |
| Mean daily minimum °C (°F) | 7.0 (44.6) | 7.0 (44.6) | 7.9 (46.2) | 9.0 (48.2) | 11.2 (52.2) | 13.6 (56.5) | 15.8 (60.4) | 16.3 (61.3) | 15.6 (60.1) | 12.9 (55.2) | 9.5 (49.1) | 7.3 (45.1) | 11.1 (52.0) |
| Average rainfall mm (inches) | 129.7 (5.11) | 130.6 (5.14) | 83.8 (3.30) | 104.6 (4.12) | 62.5 (2.46) | 18.3 (0.72) | 3.2 (0.13) | 6.6 (0.26) | 40.5 (1.59) | 128.4 (5.06) | 180.2 (7.09) | 186.4 (7.34) | 1,074.8 (42.32) |
| Average relative humidity (%) | 86 | 82 | 80 | 74 | 73 | 70 | 63 | 63 | 71 | 76 | 82 | 83 | 75 |
Source 1: Instituto de Meteorologia
Source 2: Portuguese Environment Agency (precipitation)

Climate data for Caldas de Monchique, 1951-1980, altitude: 203 m (666 ft)
| Month | Jan | Feb | Mar | Apr | May | Jun | Jul | Aug | Sep | Oct | Nov | Dec | Year |
|---|---|---|---|---|---|---|---|---|---|---|---|---|---|
| Record high °C (°F) | 23.8 (74.8) | 25.8 (78.4) | 28.3 (82.9) | 31.7 (89.1) | 36.9 (98.4) | 36.8 (98.2) | 40.8 (105.4) | 40.5 (104.9) | 38.6 (101.5) | 35.6 (96.1) | 28.8 (83.8) | 26.5 (79.7) | 40.8 (105.4) |
| Mean daily maximum °C (°F) | 15.2 (59.4) | 15.8 (60.4) | 17.4 (63.3) | 19.8 (67.6) | 23.1 (73.6) | 26.3 (79.3) | 30.0 (86.0) | 30.5 (86.9) | 28.1 (82.6) | 23.3 (73.9) | 18.6 (65.5) | 16.0 (60.8) | 22.0 (71.6) |
| Daily mean °C (°F) | 11.4 (52.5) | 11.8 (53.2) | 13.0 (55.4) | 15.0 (59.0) | 17.8 (64.0) | 20.6 (69.1) | 23.7 (74.7) | 24.2 (75.6) | 22.2 (72.0) | 18.4 (65.1) | 14.4 (57.9) | 12.0 (53.6) | 17.0 (62.7) |
| Mean daily minimum °C (°F) | 7.6 (45.7) | 7.8 (46.0) | 8.6 (47.5) | 10.2 (50.4) | 12.5 (54.5) | 14.9 (58.8) | 17.4 (63.3) | 17.9 (64.2) | 16.3 (61.3) | 13.5 (56.3) | 10.2 (50.4) | 8.0 (46.4) | 12.1 (53.7) |
| Average rainfall mm (inches) | 165.5 (6.52) | 158.1 (6.22) | 150.0 (5.91) | 80.4 (3.17) | 55.4 (2.18) | 23.8 (0.94) | 0.9 (0.04) | 6.3 (0.25) | 25.2 (0.99) | 117.4 (4.62) | 131.0 (5.16) | 162.9 (6.41) | 1,076.9 (42.41) |
| Average relative humidity (%) | 84 | 81 | 76 | 70 | 65 | 62 | 57 | 56 | 65 | 75 | 80 | 82 | 71 |
Source: Instituto de Meteorologia
