= Medronho =

Portuguese traditional fruit spirit

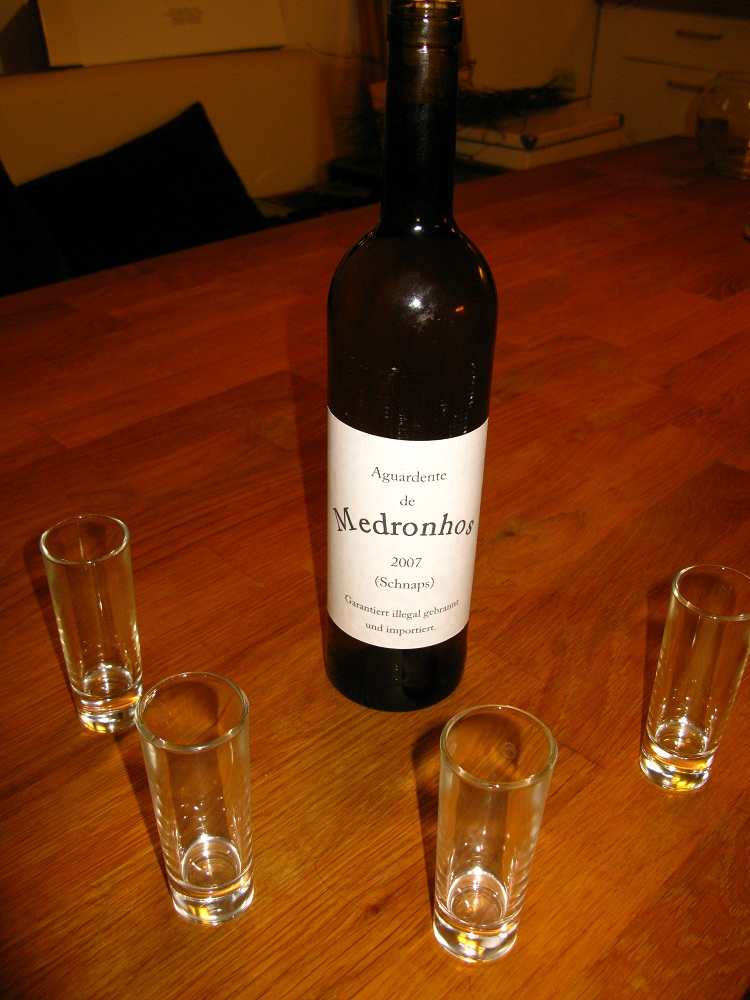
Home-made Aguardente de Medronho

The Aguardente de Medronho is a strong spirit, a traditional fruit brandy from Portugal, obtained from arbutus berries - the fruit of the Medronho tree, Arbutus unedo - also called strawberry tree. The Arbutus unedo grow wild on the poor soils in rural regions of Portugal such as Lousã and the inner Algarve (in such places like Marmelete and São Marcos da Serra).

There was no large-scale commercial plantation of Arbutus unedo until the 21st century and in the past the arbutus berries were mainly collected by local farmers, by hand and processed privately. Therefore, good Aguardente de Medronhos was not easily found in supermarkets but instead bought mostly directly from these farmers. Very few farmers had a license for distillation, but they were tolerated by the authorities to keep this traditional Portuguese specialty alive.

A commercial derivative, sweetened with honey and flavoured with herbs, is sold under the brand names Brandymel and Dom Cristina.

Aguardente (de Medronho, but equally other variants) is also known as 'firewater' to non-Portuguese speakers. It is a rough translation from água ardente, which is Portuguese for burning water. The spirit obtains this name from the hot sensation as the consumed beverage travels down the throat and is felt through the sinuses.

The alcohol content of the beverage can vary; however, many bottles of Aguardente de Medronho contain around 48% alcohol by volume. The beverage is consumed in shot-glass sized portions. Like other aguardentes, it can also be added to post-dinner coffee.
