= Philip Foy =

English-born Argentine cricketer (1891–1957)

Personal information
- Full name: Philip Arnold Foy
- Born: 16 October 1891; Axbridge, Somerset, England
- Died: 12 February 1957 (aged 65); Adrogué, Buenos Aires Province, Argentina
- Batting: Right-handed
- Bowling: Right-arm fast-medium

International information
- National side: Argentina

Domestic team information
- Years: Team
- 1909: Bedfordshire
- 1919–1930: Somerset

Career statistics
| Competition | First-class |
|---|---|
| Matches | 25 |
| Runs scored | 504 |
| Batting average | 14.00 |
| 100s/50s | –/2 |
| Top score | 72 |
| Balls bowled | 2,885 |
| Wickets | 78 |
| Bowling average | 19.53 |
| 5 wickets in innings | 7 |
| 10 wickets in match | 1 |
| Best bowling | 7/84 |
| Catches/stumpings | 20/– |
- Source: CricketArchive, 23 January 2011

Philip Arnold Foy (16 October 1891 – 12 February 1957) was an Argentine first-class cricketer who played with his national side and Somerset. His best season for Somerset came in 1920 when he took 31 wickets at 22.48 and made 352 runs. In England when not playing with Somerset he represented Bedfordshire in 1909.
