= Caldas de Monchique =

Spa town in the Algarve region of Portugal

Coordinates: 37°17′N 8°33′W

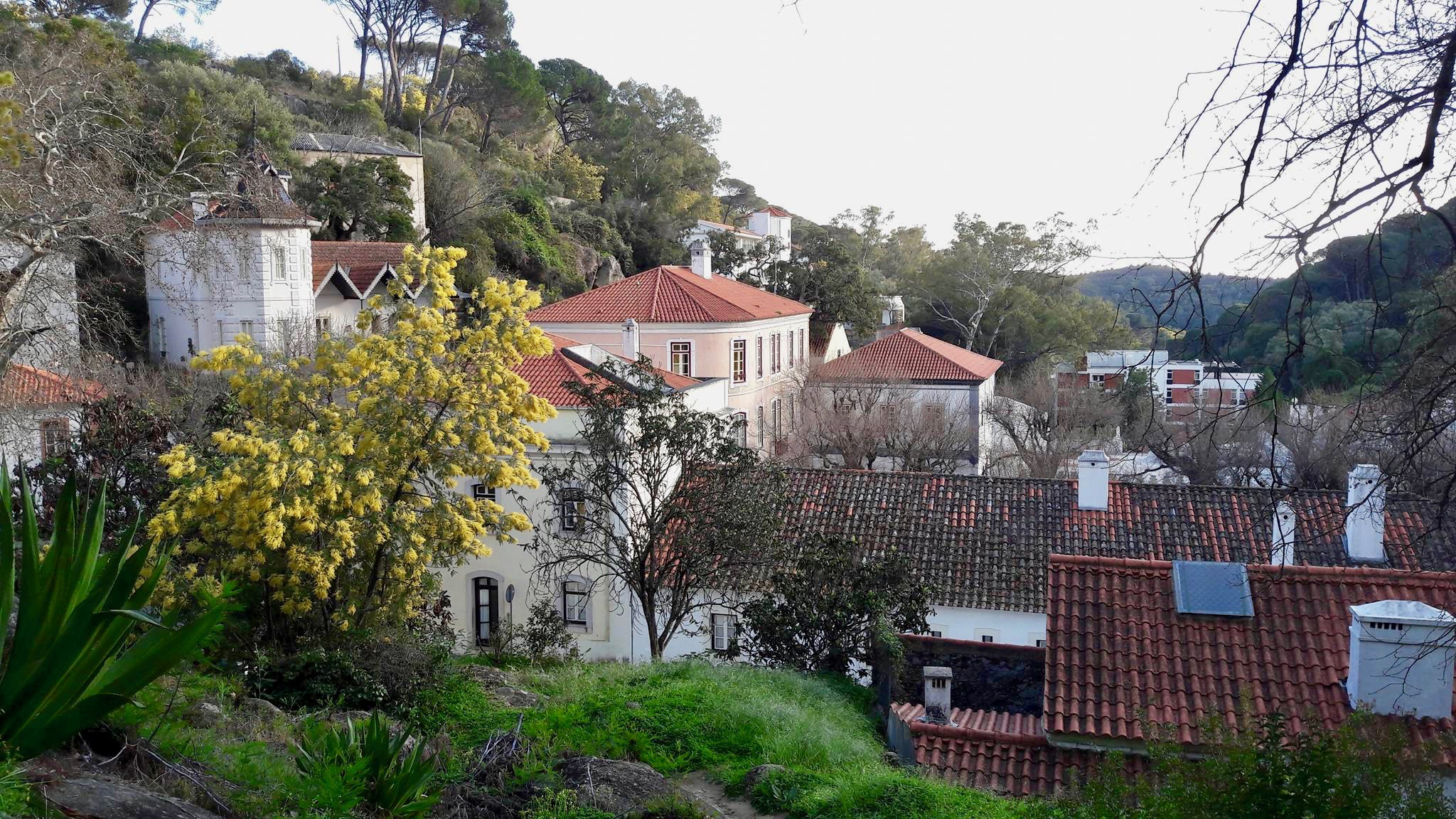
A view of the town

Caldas de Monchique is a spa town in the Monchique Mountains in the Algarve region of Portugal. It has been famous since Roman times for its waters, which supposedly have healing properties. It was also used as a seasonal retreat for Portuguese royalty. It has recently gained more international recognition, particularly for health tourism, but also for its landscape and architecture.

== Gallery ==
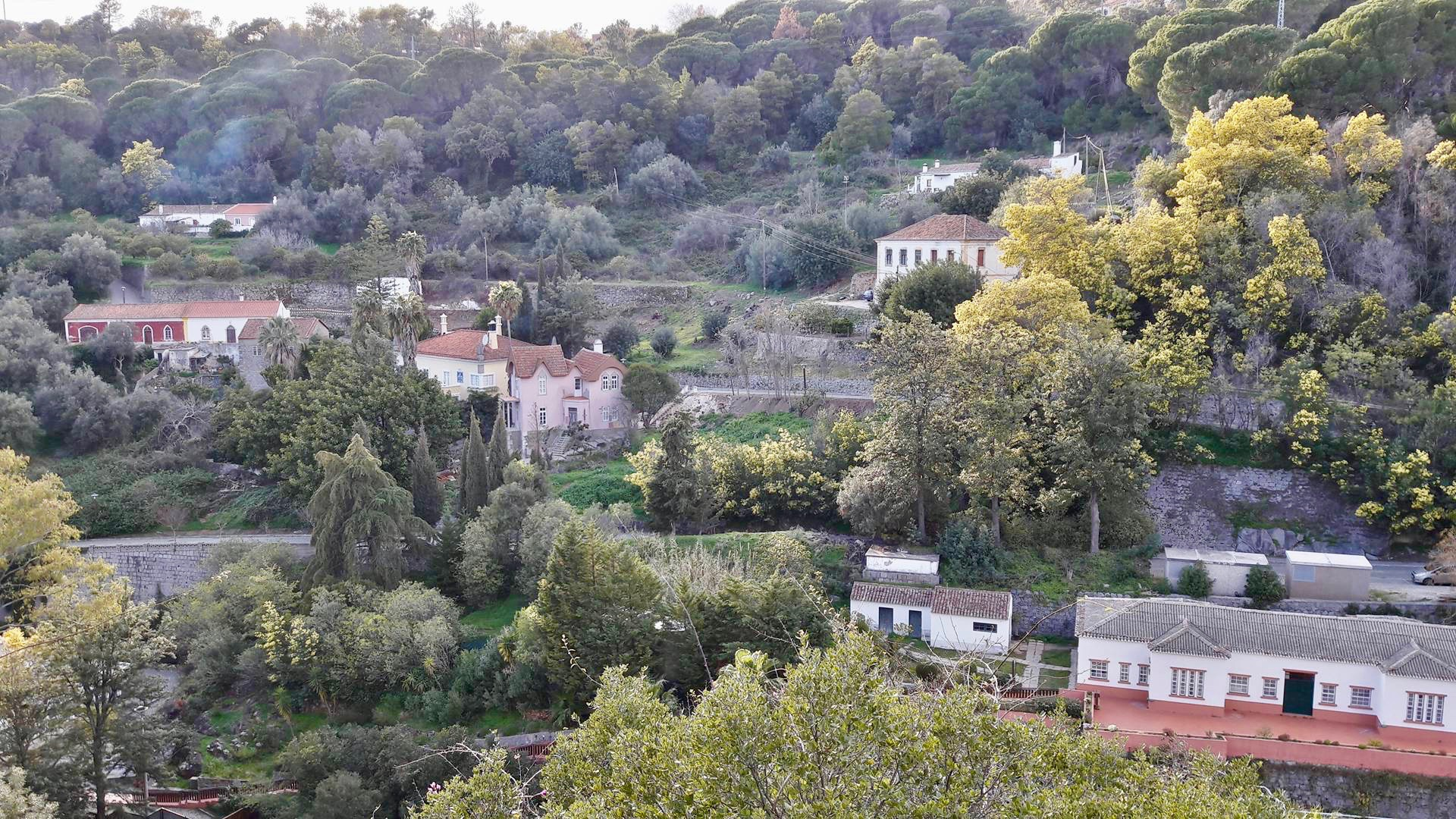
General view

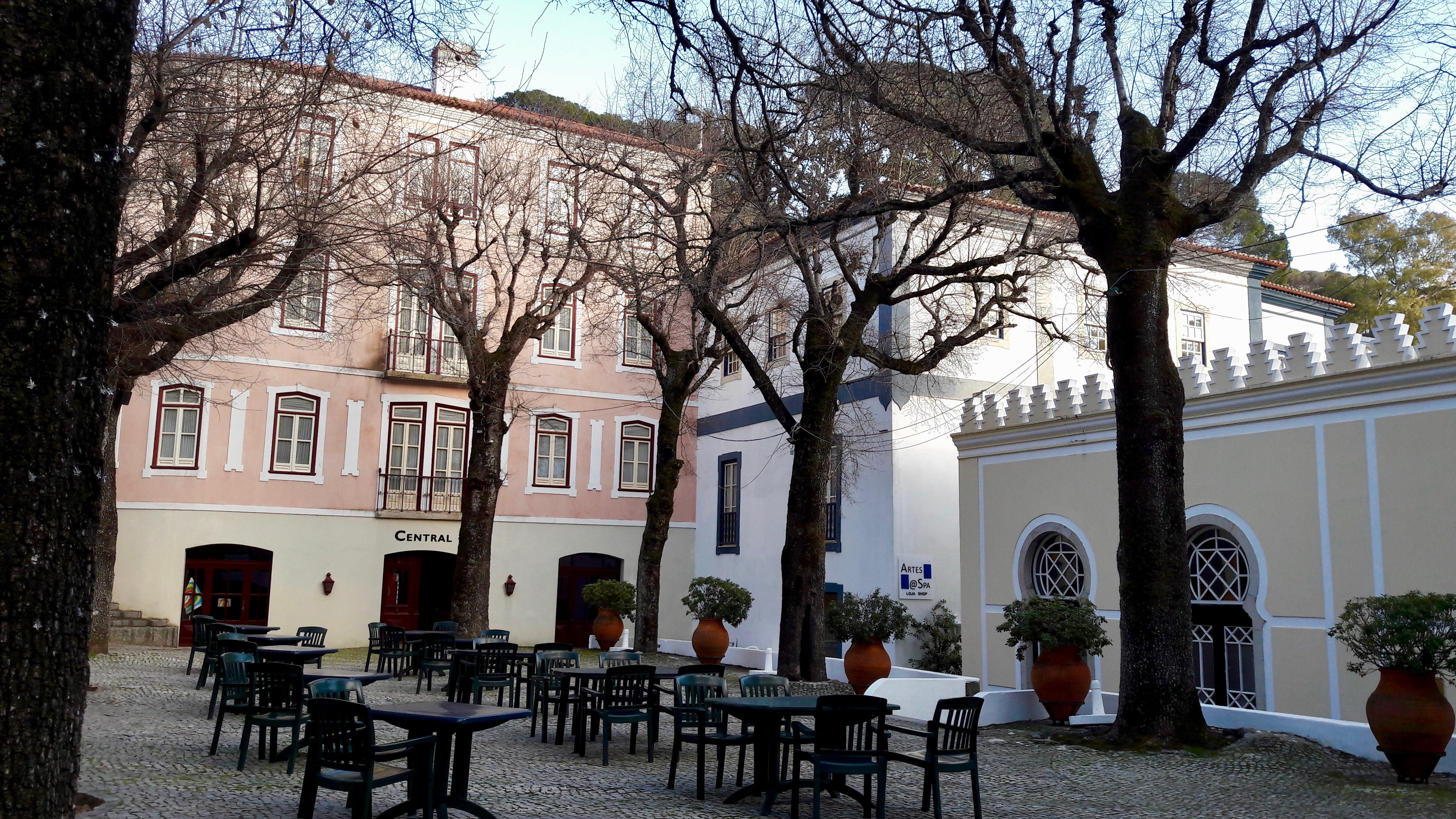
A resting place in the town

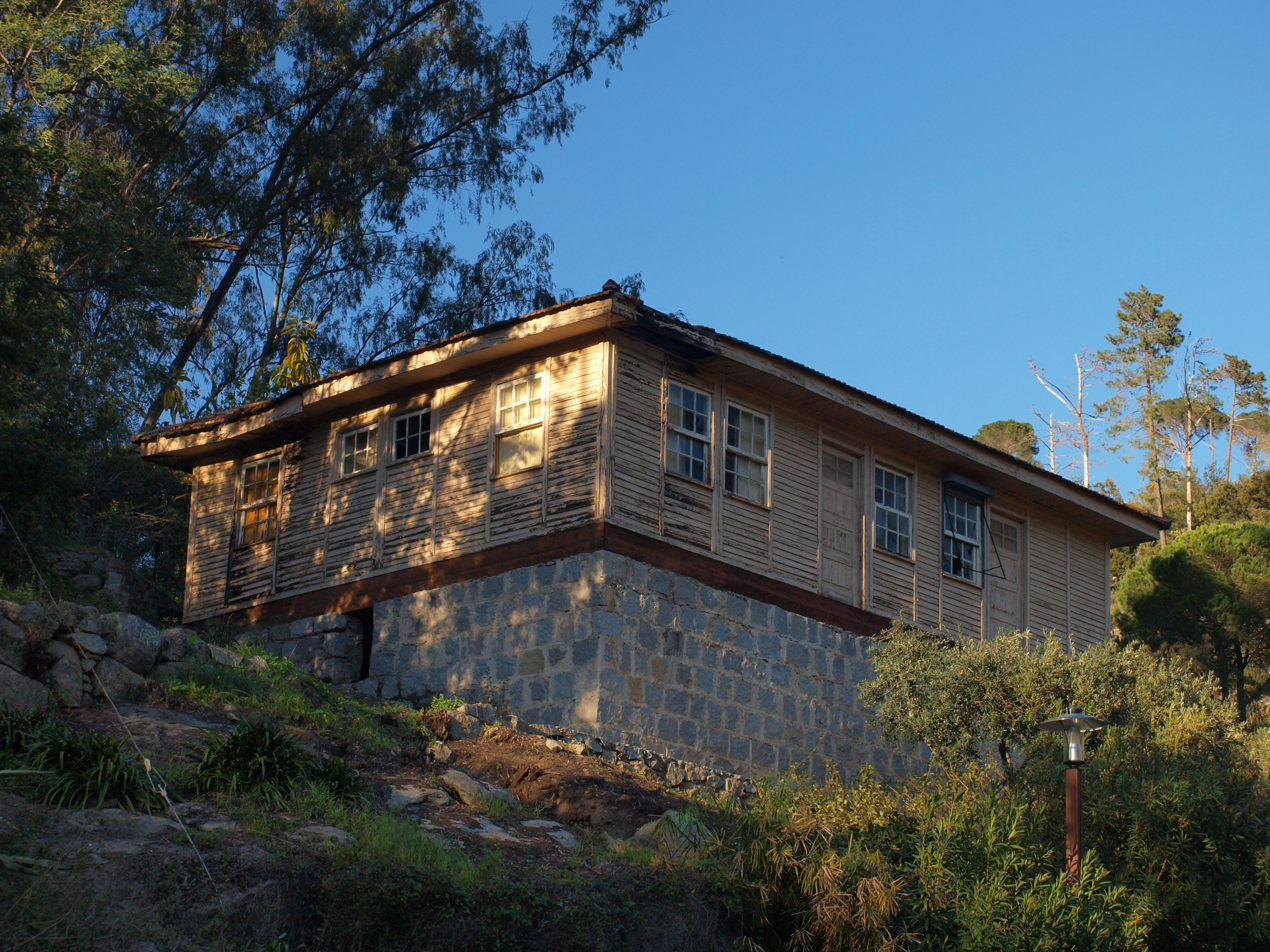
Old house

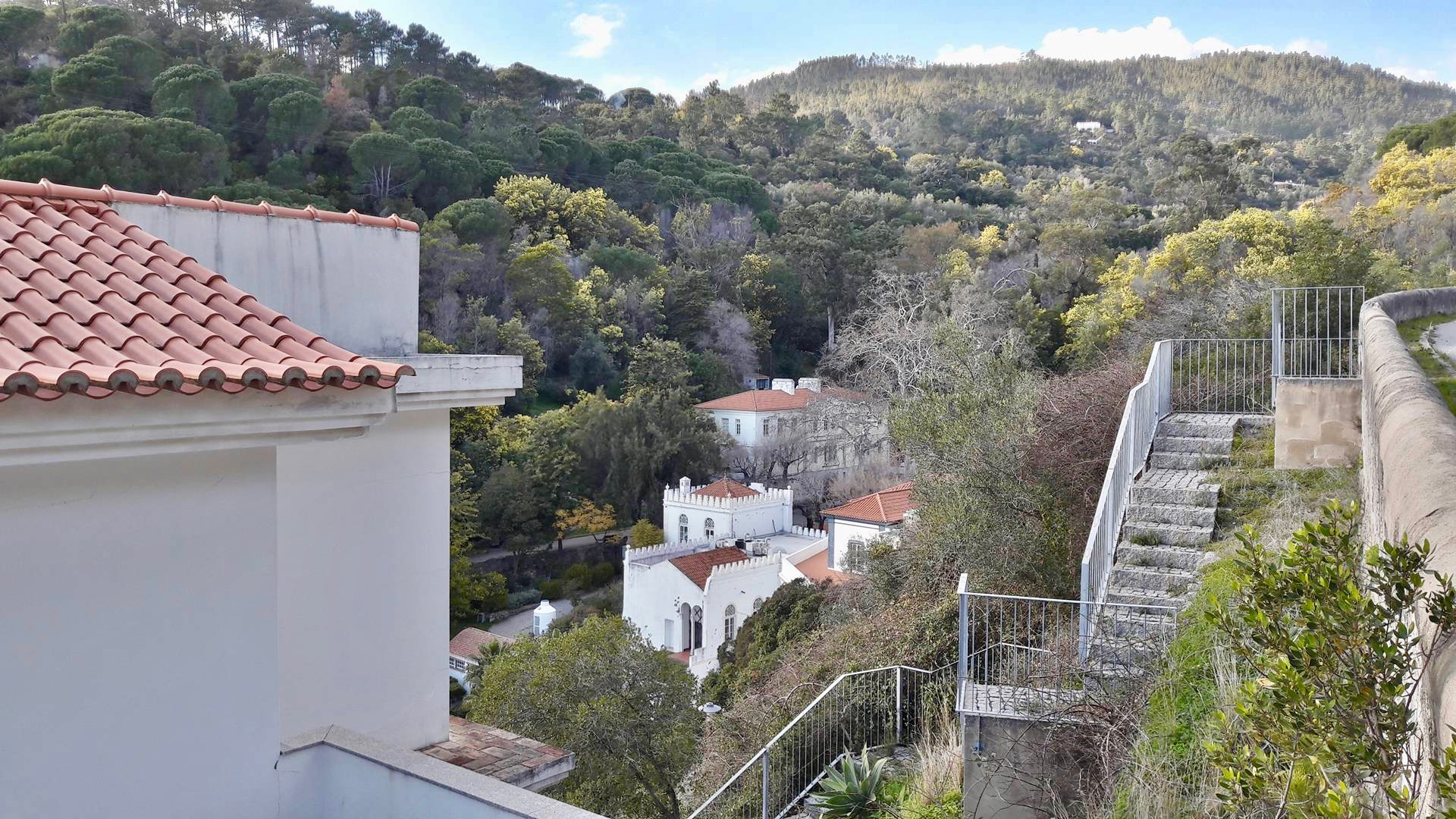
Town

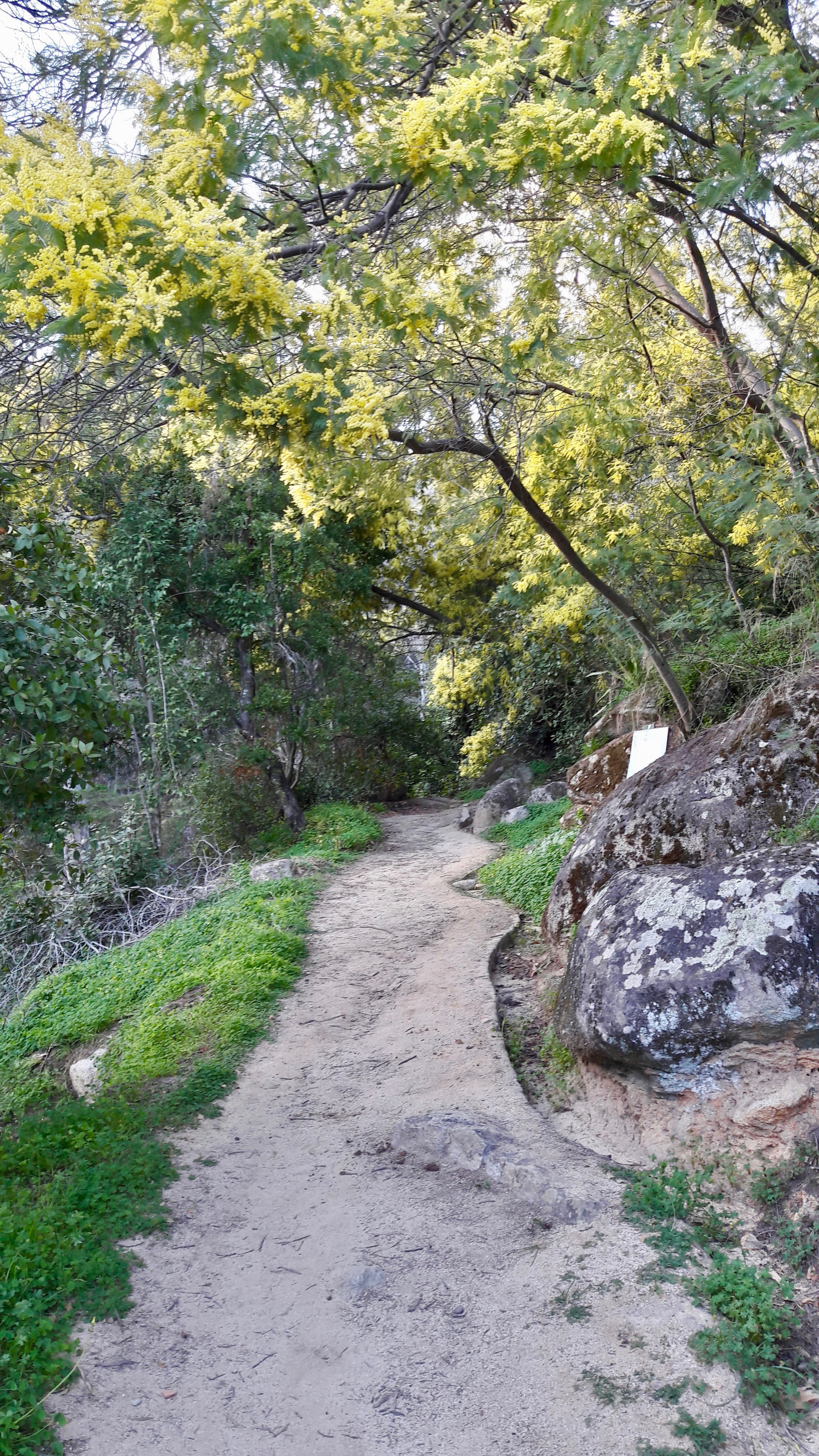
A dirt path

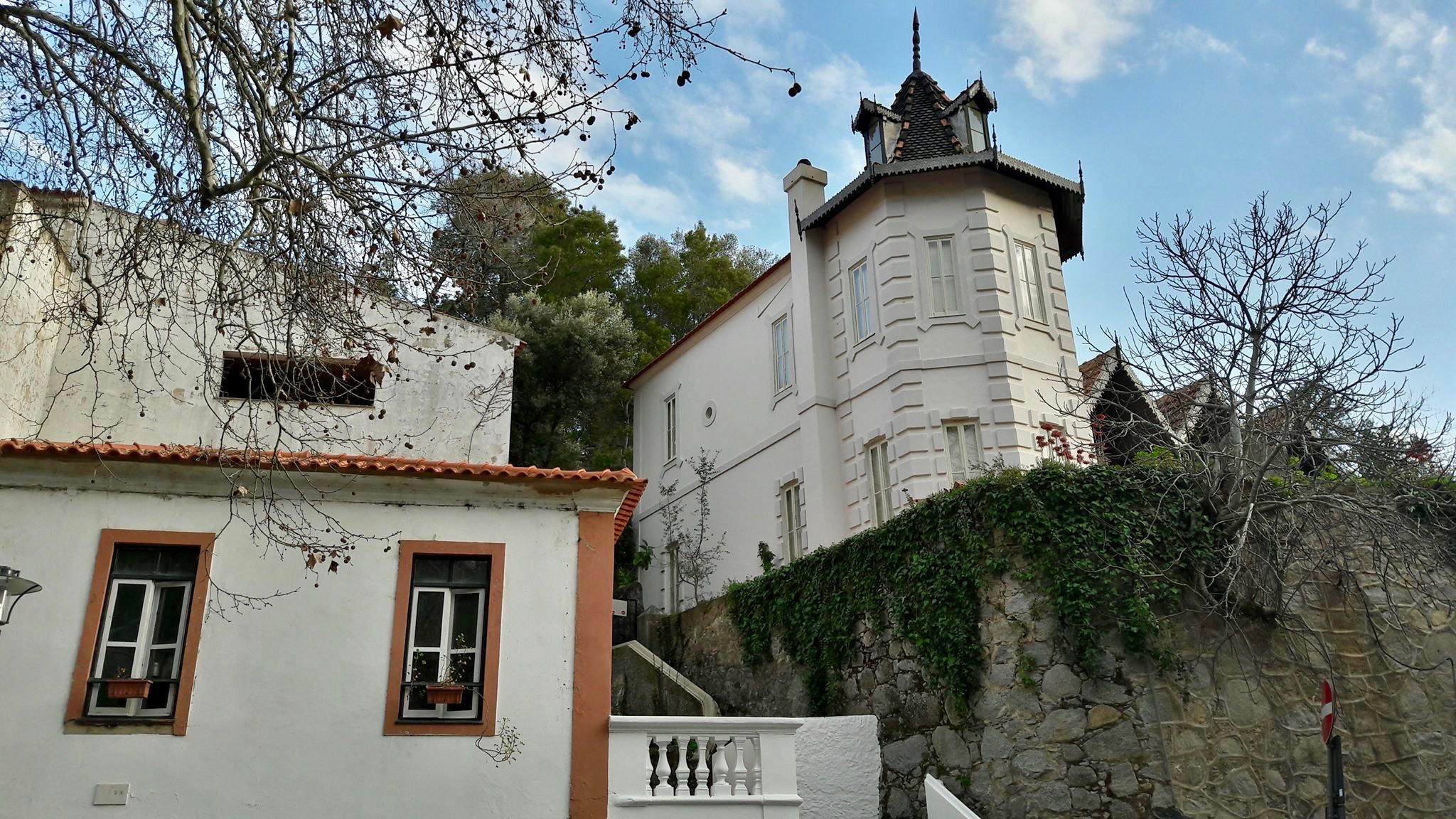
Detail of an old house

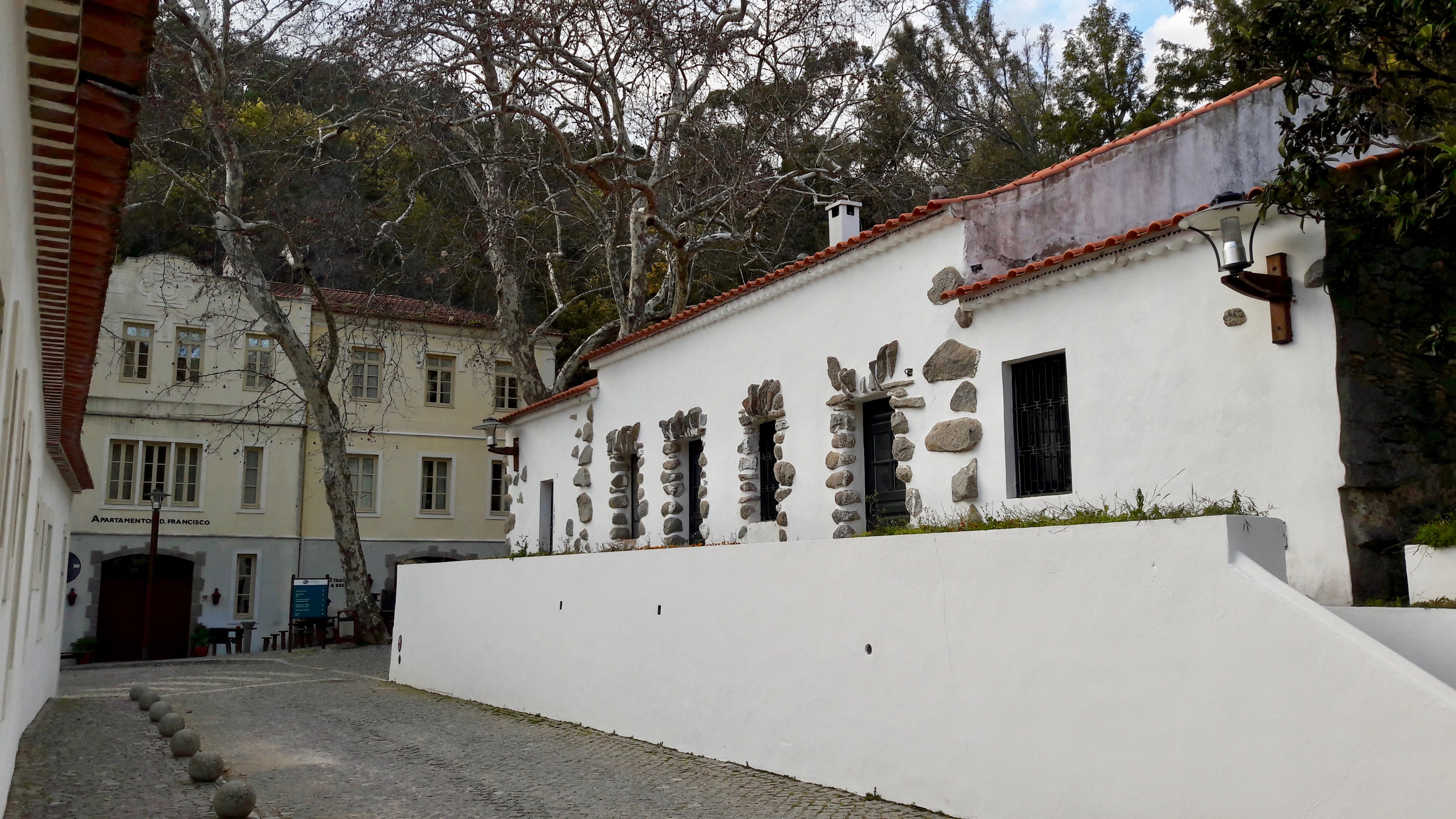
A view of the main part of town

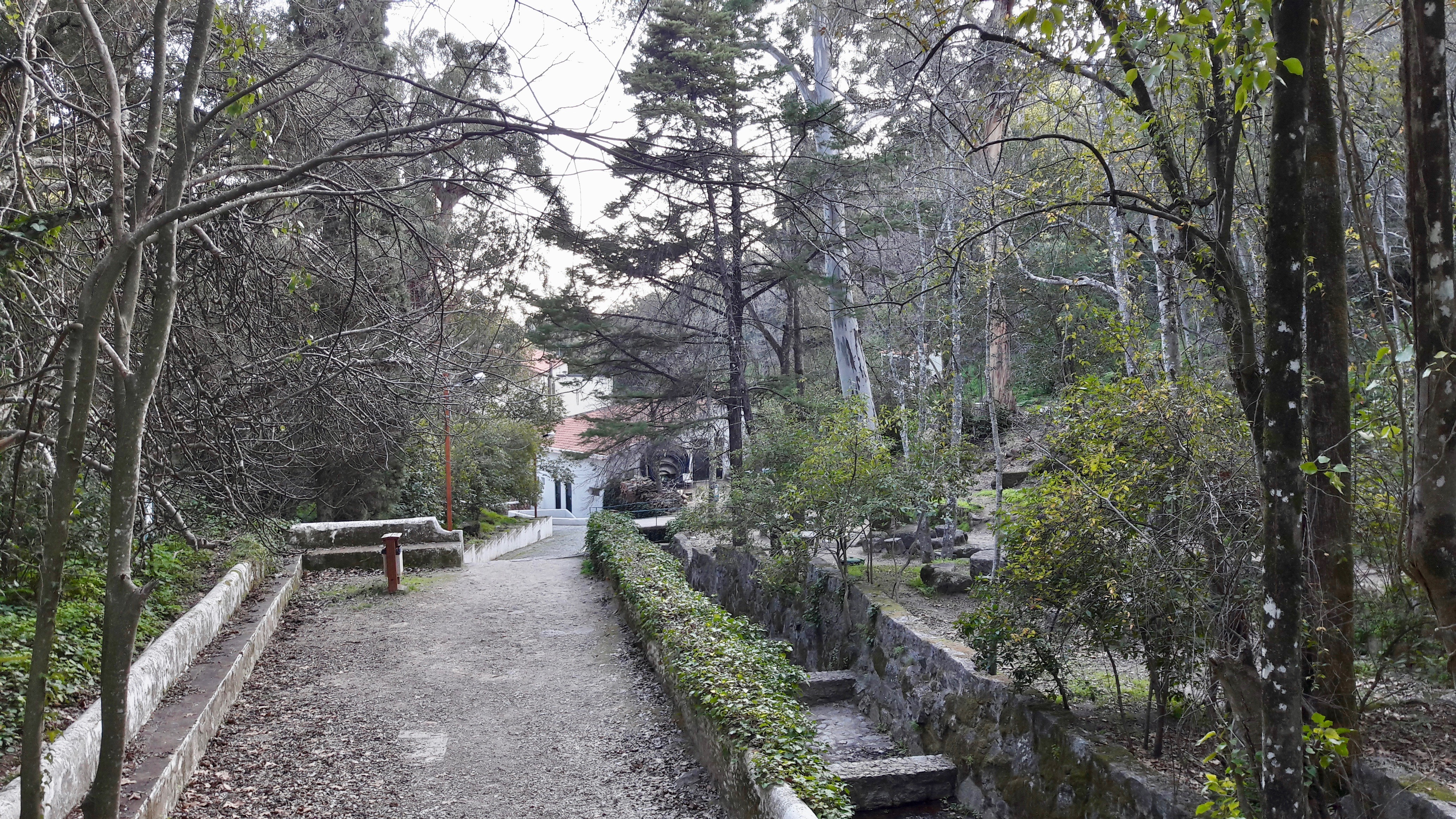
A park in Caldas de Monchique
