= FOI =

FOI, foi, or Foi may refer to:

== Organisations ==
- Family Opera Initiative, an American opera company
- Fellowship of Isis, an international spiritual organization
- Forum Oratori Italiani, a Catholic youth organization
- Fruit of Islam, a paramilitary wing of the Nation of Islam
- Swedish Defence Research Agency (Swedish: Totalförsvarets forskningsinstitut (FOI))

== Other uses ==
- Freedom of information, the freedom of a person or people to publish and consume information
- Sainte-Foi, a commune in France
- Foi, a village in Romania
- Foi language, Papua New Guinea (ISO 639-3 code: foi)
- Foi Wambui, (born 1997) a Kenyan actress

== See also ==
- Saint Faith (French: Sainte Foy), a third-century French saint
- Foy (disambiguation)
- Foia (disambiguation)
