= Frederick Foy =

English cricketer

Personal information
- Full name: Frederick George Foy
- Born: 11 April 1915; Maidstone, Kent
- Died: 10 February 1995 (aged 79); Tunbridge Wells, Kent
- Batting: Right-handed
- Bowling: Slow left-arm orthodox
- Role: Allrounder

Domestic team information
- Years: Team
- 1937–1938: Kent
- FC debut: 29 May 1937 Kent v Leicestershire
- Last FC: 13 July 1938 Kent v Essex

Career statistics
Competition	First-class
Matches	11
Runs scored	153
Batting average	9.56
100s/50s	0/0
Top score	25
Balls bowled	42
Wickets	0
Bowling average	–
5 wickets in innings	–
10 wickets in match	–
Best bowling	–
Catches/stumpings	5/–
- Source: Cricinfo, 30 December 2021

Frederick George Foy (11 April 1915 – 10 February 1995) was an English professional cricketer. He played 11 first-class matches for Kent County Cricket Club between 1937 and 1938.

Foy was born at Maidstone in Kent in 1915, the son of Frederick and Bentley Foy. He was educated at Royal Victoria School in Tunbridge Wells but had been working in Leicester before he was given a trial by Kent in 1933. He was taken on to the ground staff and first played for Kent's Second XI in 1934, initially as a spin bowler.

A lack of opportunity bowling meant that Foy began to play predominantly as a batsman and in 1937 he made 1,200 runs in the Second XI, finishing second in the batting averages. He made his First XI debut in May 1937 against Leicestershire in the County Championship. The Times reported that he batted "with confidence" in scoring 25 runs in a partnership of 70 runs for the seventh wicket. He played in five first-class matches in 1937 and six in 1938 before leaving the county's staff to take up a job as a police officer. In total he scored 125 runs at a batting average of 9.56 in first-class cricket, with his score of 25 on debut remaining his highest score.

Foy played club cricket for Linden Park Cricket Club and made appearances for Sutton Valence and Metropolitan Police. He married Anne Barr in 1940 and died at Tunbridge Wells in 1995. He was aged 79.

== Bibliography ==
- Carlaw, Derek (2020). Kent County Cricketers, A to Z: Part Two (1919–1939) (PDF). Cardiff: ACS.
