= Pat Foy =

Australian rules footballer

Personal information
- Full name: Pat Foy
- Born: 1 January 1965 (age 61)
- Original team: Parkmore
- Height: 181 cm (5 ft 11 in)
- Weight: 80 kg (176 lb)
- Position: Defence

Playing career^{1}
Years	Club	Games (Goals)
1984	Sydney	7 (1)
- ^{1} Playing statistics correct to the end of 1984.

Pat Foy (born 1 January 1965) is a former Australian rules footballer who played with Sydney in the Victorian Football League (VFL).
