= Arthur Foye =

American Certified Public Accountant

Arthur Bevins Foye
- Born: 1893
- Died: 1976 (aged 82–83)
- Occupation: Accountant
- Employer: Haskins & Sells

Arthur Bevins Foye (1893–1976) was an American Certified Public Accountant (CPA).

Foyes graduated magna cum laude from New York University in 1914 before going to work for Haskins & Sells. He was managing partner of the firm from 1947 until his retirement in 1956. Foye obtained his CPA license in 1923.

Foye was known for his interest in international affairs and, in 1959, served as chairman of the eighth annual conference of the United Nations Economic and Social Council. He was an inductee into the Accounting Hall of Fame.

Foyes was married and had one child.

== Works ==
- Foye, Arthur B. (1970). Haskins & Sells: Our first seventy-five years.
