= Mary Foy =

Mary Foy may refer to:

- Mary Foy (librarian) (1862–1962), first woman head librarian of the Los Angeles Public Library
- Mary Lou Foy (born 1944), American photojournalist
- Mary Kelly Foy (born 1968), British politician and Labour Party MP for the City of Durham since 2019
