= Monchique (parish) =

Parish in Portugal

- Civil parish
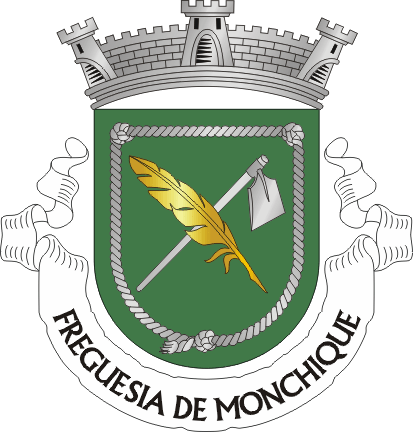
- Coat of arms

- Location in Portugal
- Coordinates: 37.319°N 8.556°W
- Country: Portugal
- Region: Algarve
- Intermunic. comm.: Algarve
- District: Faro
- Municipality: Monchique

Area
  - Total: 159.28 km^{2} (61.50 sq mi)

Population (2011)
  - Total: 4,817
  - Density: 30.24/km^{2} (78.33/sq mi)
- Time zone: UTC+00:00 (WET)
  - Summer (DST): UTC+01:00 (WEST)
- Website: jf-monchique.pt

Monchique is a freguesia (parish) in Monchique Municipality (Algarve, Portugal). The population in 2011 was 4,817, in an area of 159.28 km².

== Main sites ==
- Nossa Senhora do Desterro Convent
- Monchique Church or Nossa Senhora da Conceição Church
- Fóia, highest mountain in Algarve
