= Sainte-Foy =

Sainte Foy or Sainte Foi (French, 'Saint Faith' or 'holy faith') may refer to:

== Places ==
=== France ===
- Sainte-Foi, in the Ariège département
- Sainte-Foy, Landes, in the Landes département
- Sainte-Foy, Saône-et-Loire, in the Saône-et-Loire département
- Sainte-Foy, Seine-Maritime, in the Seine-Maritime département
- Sainte-Foy, Vendée, in the Vendée département
- Sainte-Foy-d'Aigrefeuille, in the Haute-Garonne département
- Sainte-Foy-de-Belvès, in the Dordogne département
- Sainte-Foy-de-Longas, in the Dordogne département
- Sainte-Foy-de-Montgommery, in the Calvados département
- Sainte-Foy-de-Peyrolières, in the Haute-Garonne département
- Sainte-Foy-la-Grande, in the Gironde département
- Sainte-Foy-la-Longue, in the Gironde département
- Sainte-Foy-l'Argentière, in the Rhône département
- Sainte-Foy-lès-Lyon, in the Rhône département
- Sainte-Foy-Saint-Sulpice, in the Loire département
- Sainte-Foy-Tarentaise, in the Savoie département
- Abbey Church of Sainte-Foy, in Conques, Aveyron département

=== North America ===
- Sainte-Foy, Quebec City, Canada
  - Sainte-Foy station

== People ==
- Charles-Louis Sainte-Foy (1817–1877), French opera singer
- Saint Faith, 3rd-century French saint, Sainte-Foy in French

== See also ==
- Santa Fe (disambiguation)
