= Serra de Monchique =

Mountain range in Portugal

Monchique Range
- Serra de Monchique
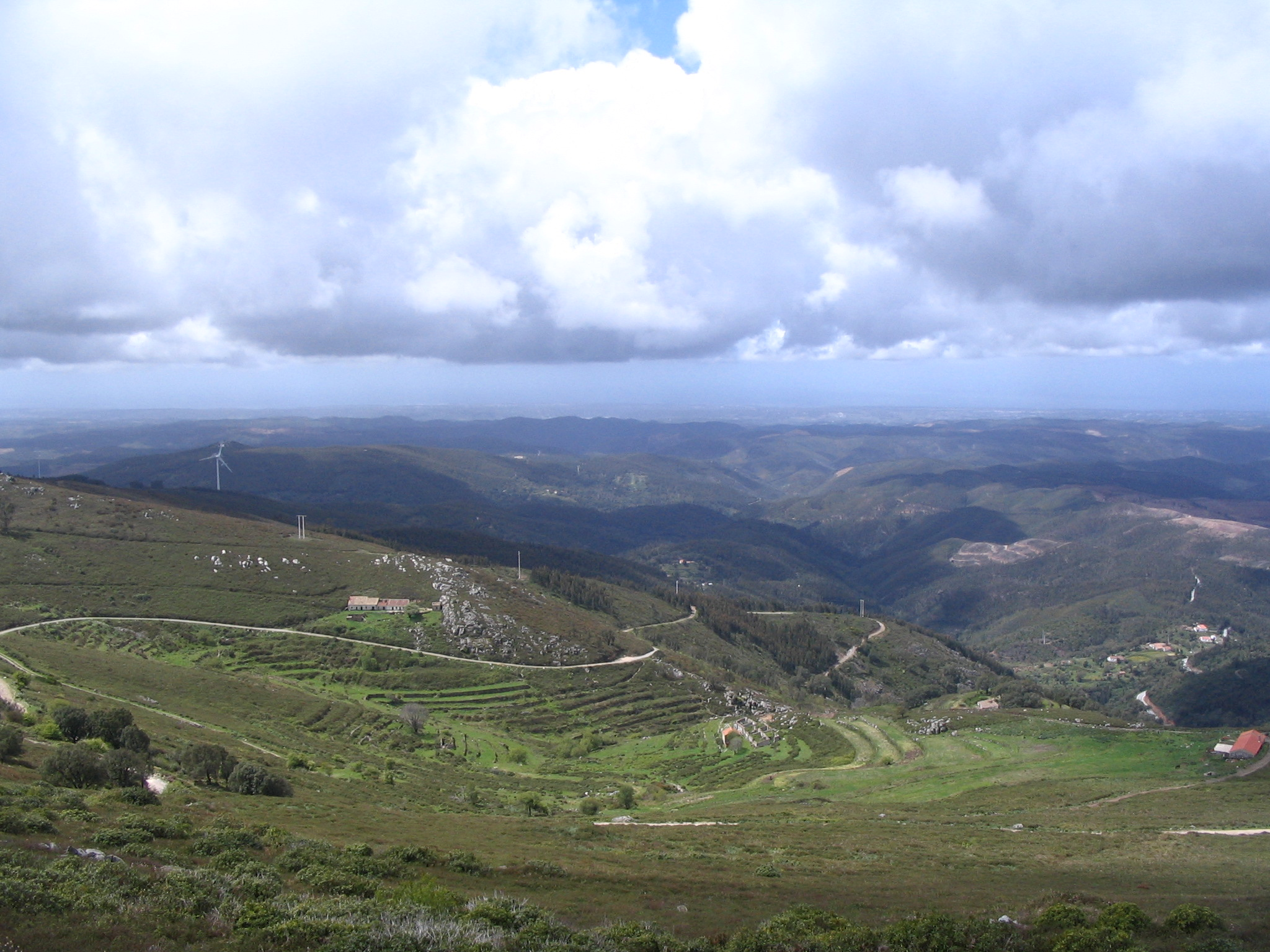
- View of the Serra de Monchique

Highest point
- Peak: Fóia
- Elevation: 902 m (2,959 ft)
- Coordinates: 37°19′N 8°36′W

Dimensions
- Length: 32 km (20 mi) NE/SW
- Width: 7 km (4.3 mi) NW/SE

Geography
- Location within Portugal
- Country: Portugal
- Region: Algarve
- Range coordinates: 37°19′N 8°36′W

Geology
- Orogeny: Alpine
- Rock age: Late Cretaceous
- Rock type(s): Syenite, slate

The Serra de Monchique (Monchique Range) is a chain of mountains in the western part of the Algarve region of Portugal, about 20 km inshore. The chain's highest point is the peak of Fóia, at 902 m. 774 m high Picota is another notable peak.

== Description ==
The Monchique Range is the southwesternmost mountain range of the Iberian Peninsula. It is covered in forest and parts of the range have been transformed into eucalyptus, pine and acacia plantations which are detrimental to the native forest cover. The range is named after the town of Monchique, located in the area. Caldas de Monchique is a well-known spa town with geothermal springs also located in this range.

Rivers Seixe, Aljezur and Odiáxere have their sources in this range.

=== Geology ===
The Monchique Range is part of the Late-Cretaceous Iberian Alkaline Igneous Province and is related to the Mount Ormonde seamount in the Gorringe Bank. The inselberg is formed primarily of nepheline-syenites (foyaite, for which 'Foia' is the type locality). At c.63 km^{2} Monchique the fourth largest miaskitic nepheline-syenite intrusion so far discovered. It is assumed to be of 'laccolithic' form, from its regular contact altitude to the Breijera formation (country rock). Pegmatites of similar foyaitic composition are seen within the mass at two locations and an associated dyke swarm of lamprophyres and picrites extends some 3 km from the mountain. the psammite/shale/marl country rocks of the Breijera formation are well exposed to the west of Serra de Monchique, forming jagged outcrops and dramatic gorges, which since the destructive introduction of eucalyptus farming in 1976, now run dry most of the year round.

=== Ecology ===
Serra de Monchique is threatened by continued aggressive eucalyptus 'cash-crop' farming, recent publications have shown the water table to be lowering significantly and many endemic species to be on the brink of extinction, including the Bonellis Eagle, the Iberian emerald lizard and many more listed under European Union protection. The area is protected as Natura 2000 site (Monchique, EU code PTCON0037), as both a Special Protection Area under the Birds Directive and a Site of Community Importance under the Habitats Directive.

Boundaries of the area protected under the Natura 2000 network

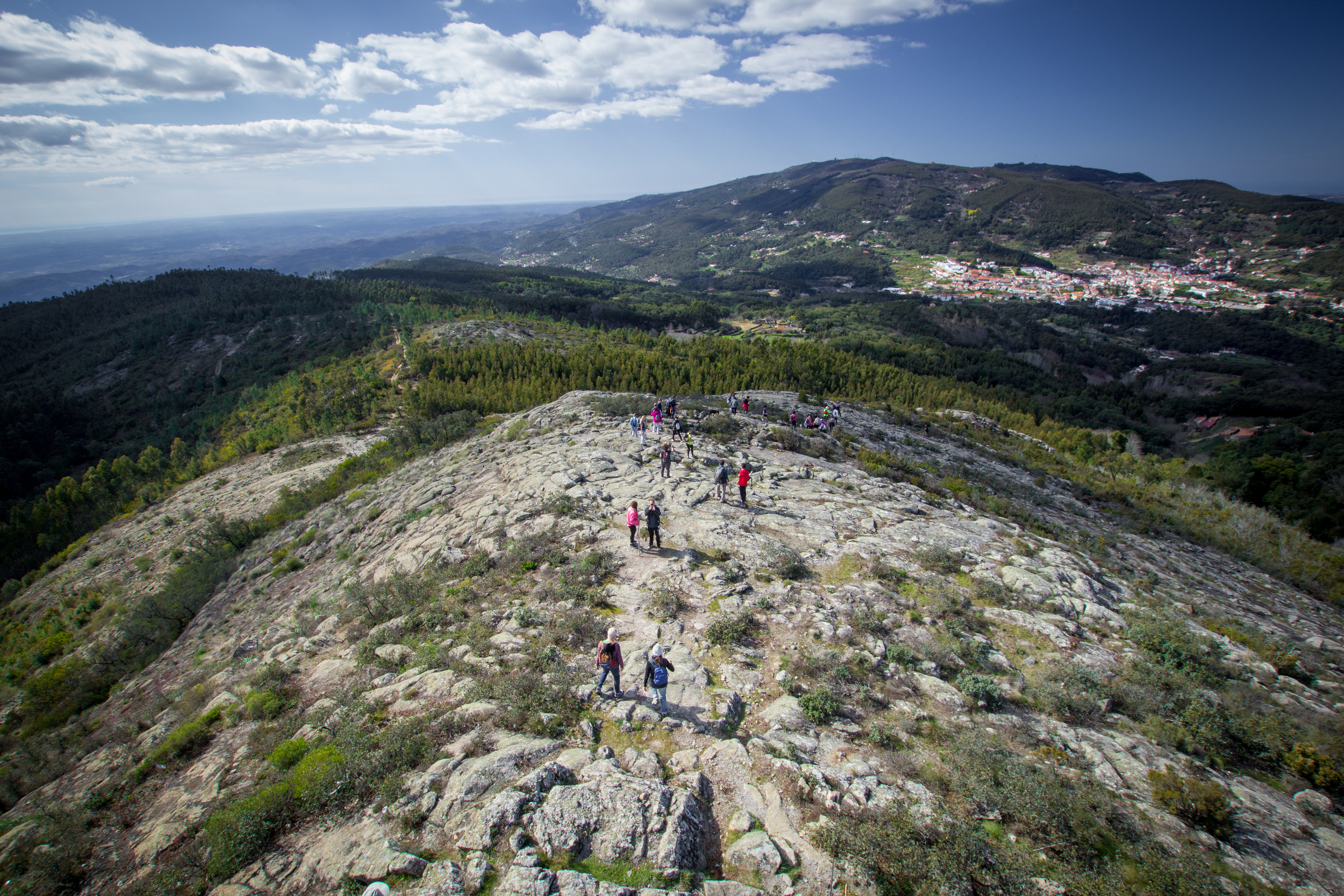
View of Monchique

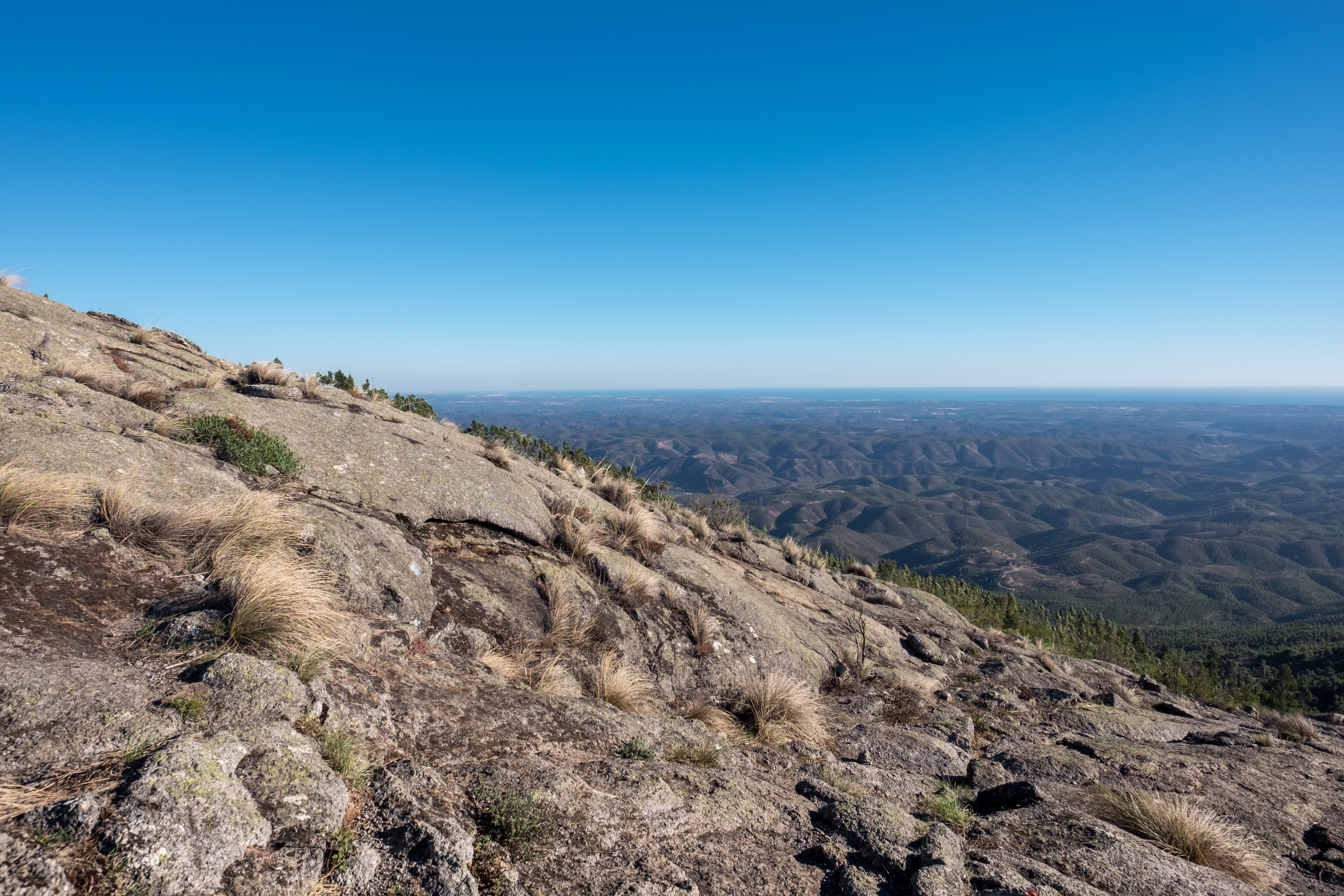
View of the rough Algarvian terrain and the Atlantic Ocean

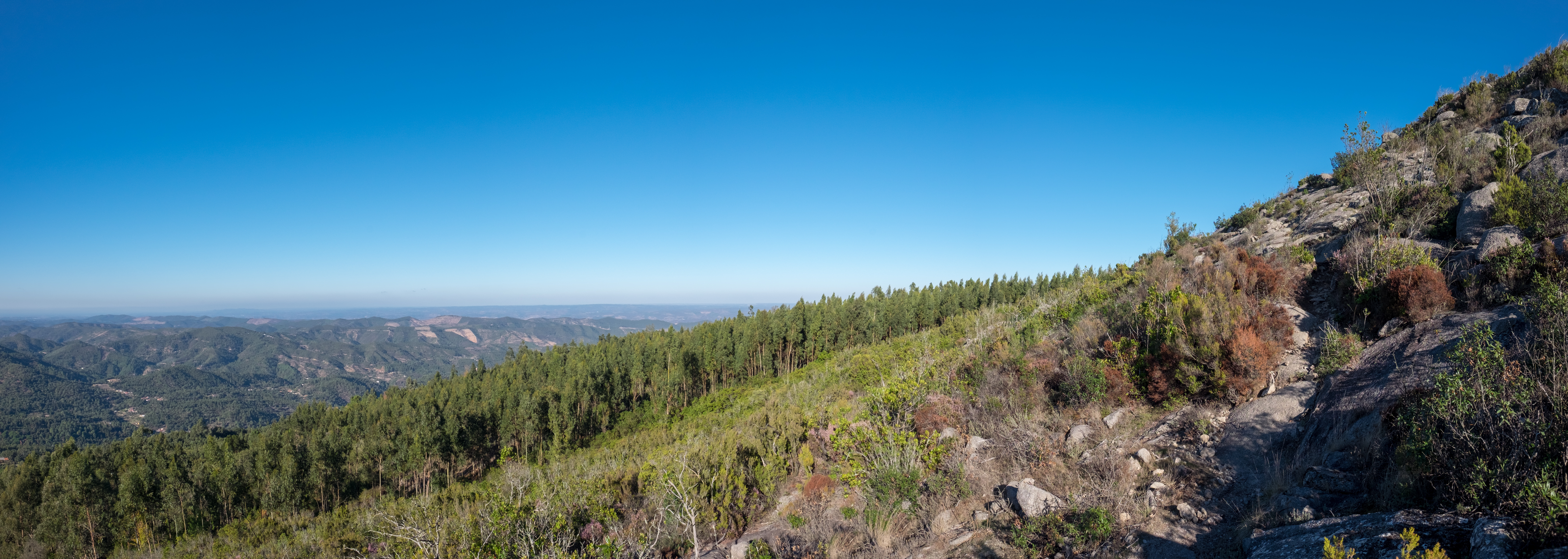
Eucalyptus plantations

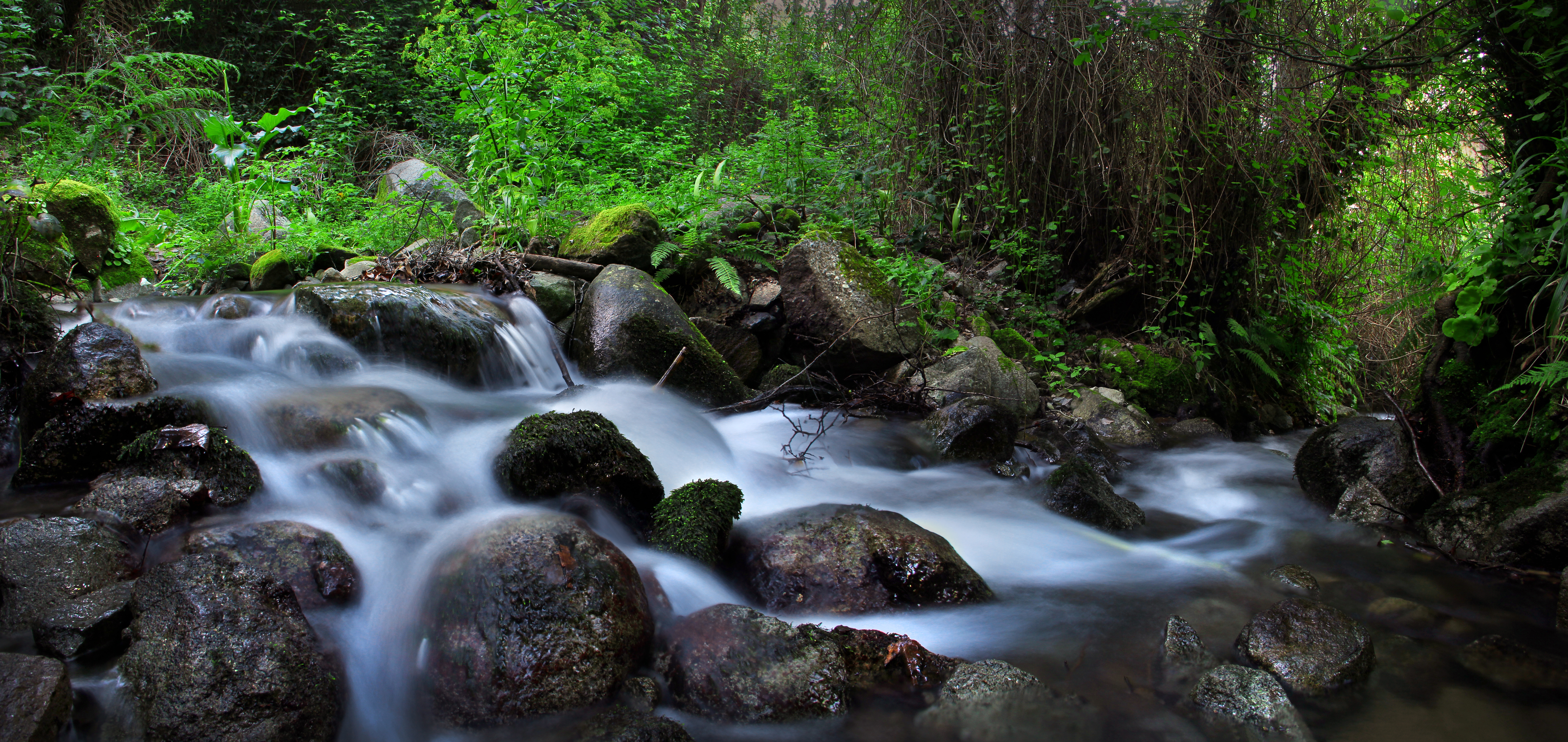
Stream at Barranco de Pisões

== See also ==
- Geography of Portugal
- Geology of the Iberian Peninsula
