= Picoña Castle =

Medieval fortification in Calvos de Randín, Ourense

Coordinates: 41°53′32.669″N 7°51′58.630″W

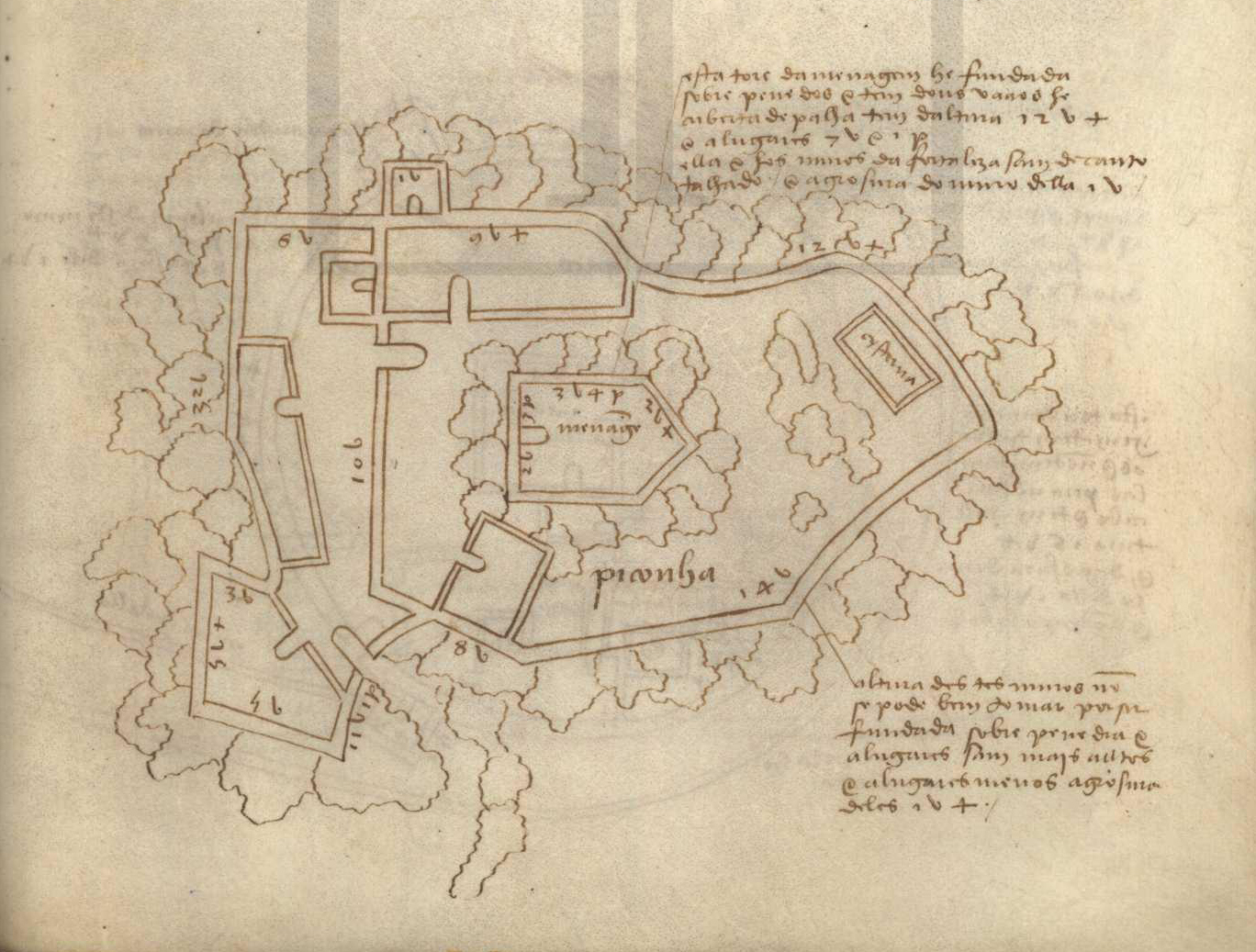
Picoña Castle plan (Book of Fortresses, 1510)

The Picoña Castle (Spanish: Castillo de la Picoña; Galician: Castelo da Picoña; Portuguese: Castelo da Piconha) is a Portuguese medieval fortification now situated in the Spanish municipality of Calvos de Randín, Ourense, Galicia. The castle, now in ruins, dates back to the early period of Portuguese independence (12th century) and was constructed over a previous Callaeci fort. In 1650 it was destroyed by Spanish troops during the Portuguese Restoration War.

Even though the castle was the head of the Terras da Piconha, this jurisdiction was suppressed in 1866 with the transfer of the land to the Kingdom of Spain. The castle, part of the domains of the House of Braganza also guaranteed the privileges of the Couto Misto, an independent state formed by the villages of Santiago, Meaus and Rubiás.

The ruins of the pillars are preserved, lacking classification by the public authorities and archaeological excavations. Currently only the cistern dug into the rock is visible.

== History ==
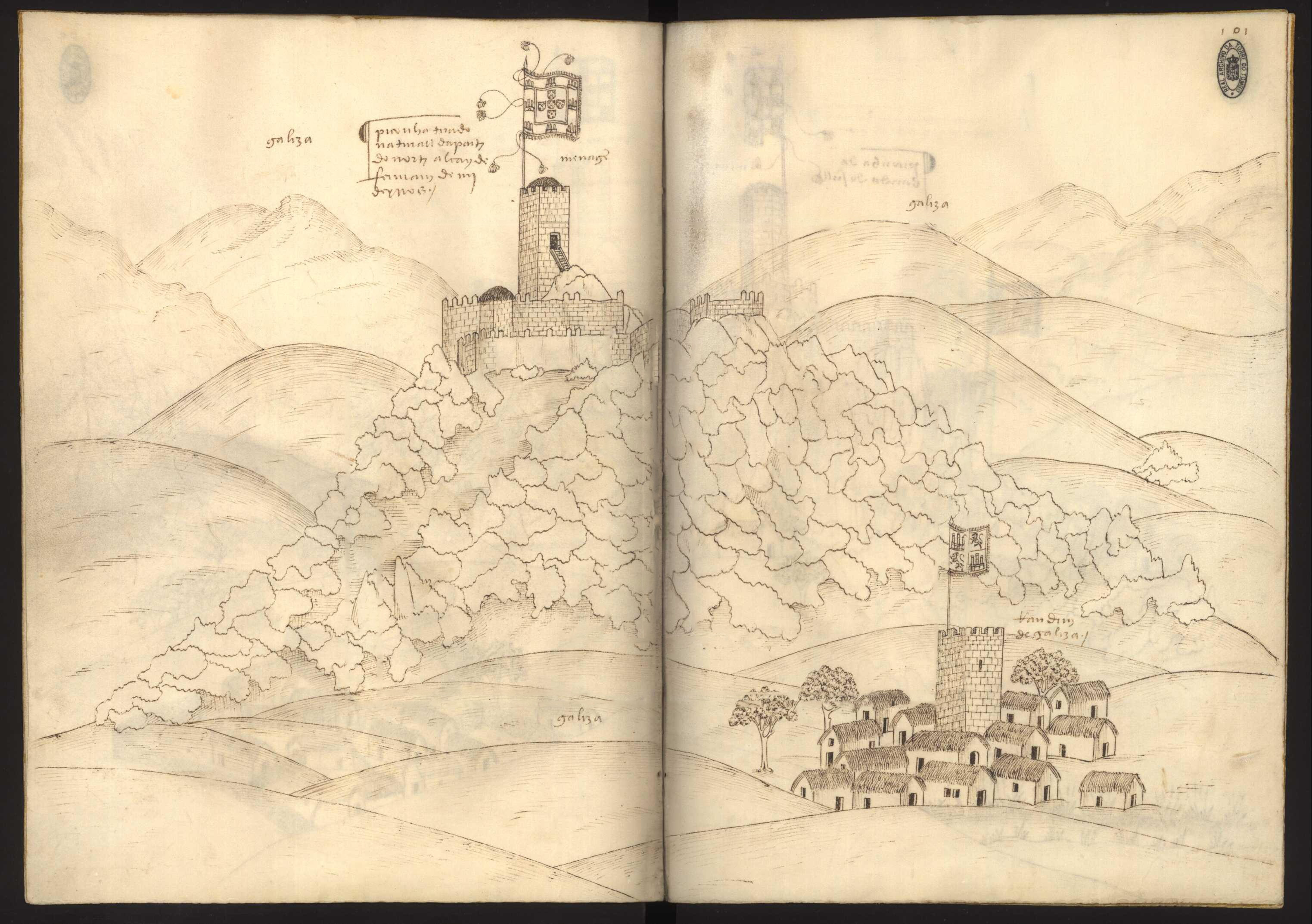
Picoña Castle and Randín (Book of Fortresses, 1510)

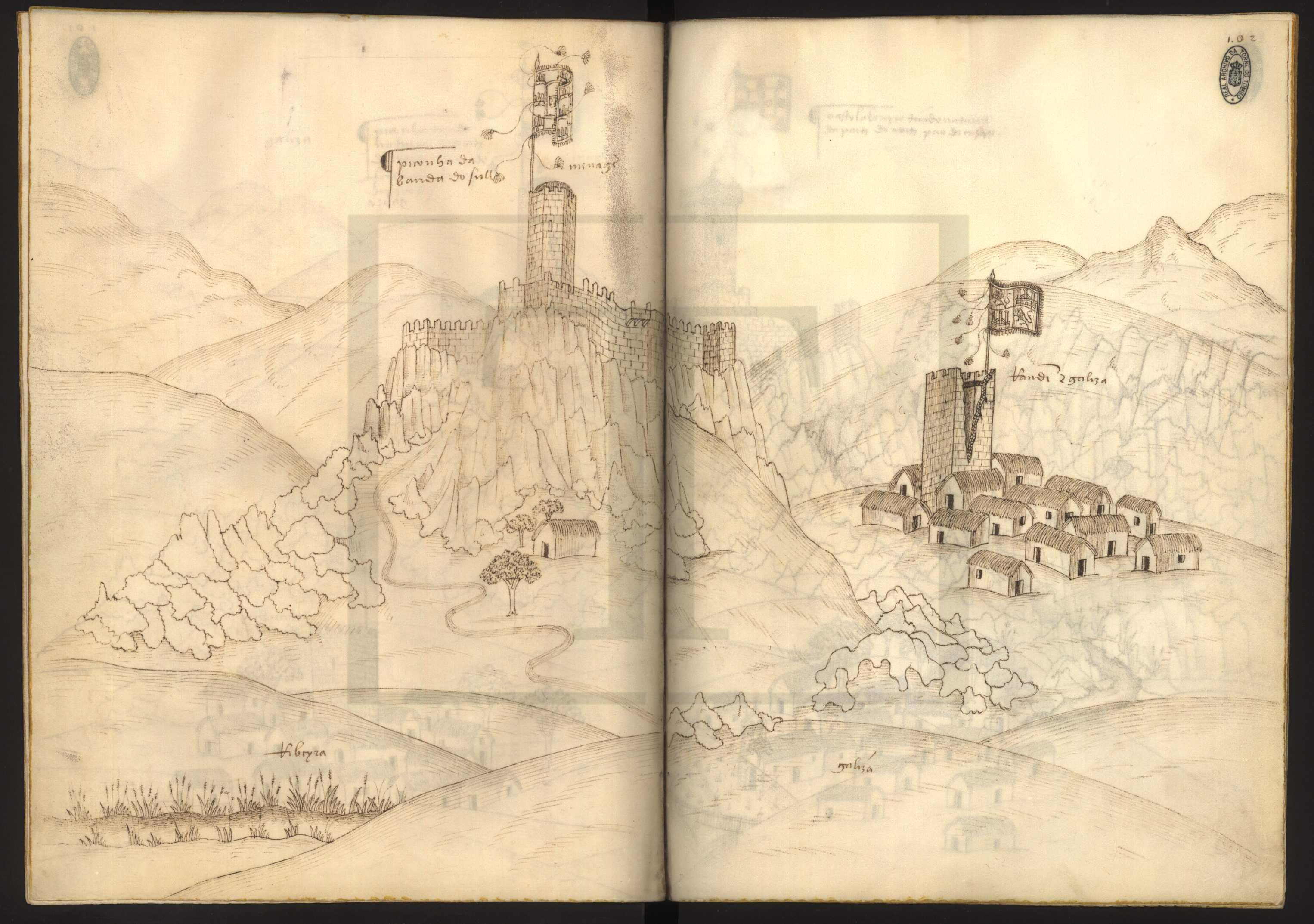
Picoña Castle and Randín from the South (Book of Fortresses, 1510)

The castle was built by Alfonso III of León in the 10th century. At the time of Portuguese independence the population living in areas bordering Galicia increased. The Castle of Picoña thus became an important Portuguese border fortification, intended to defend together with the castles of Portelo, Montalegre, Monforte and Chaves, the Cávado and Tâmega river valleys. The Foral Charter of Tourém, dated from 1187 and attributed to D. Sancho I, indicates that municipality as head of the Terras da Piconha. The same king granted San Paio de Picoña the category of village.

Destroyed by Castile in the 14th century, the castle was rebuilt by John I of Portugal and donated to D. Afonso, the future Duke of Bragança.

In the context of the Portuguese Restoration War the castle, together with other neighboring fortifications in the region, was demolished by Spanish troops in 1650.

From 1732 onwards Picoña passed to Spain, but it continued to appear in royal and stately documents as under Portuguese rule up to 1796. In the context of the border demarcation between Portugal and Spain, a document from 1756 notes that "it is in Galicia but it is Portuguese". A document from 1796 states that: "There is in this honor [ Tourém ] the alcaidaria-mor of the Castle of Piconha that is inside, in Galliza, and there is a road of its own for it through the parish of Rendim".

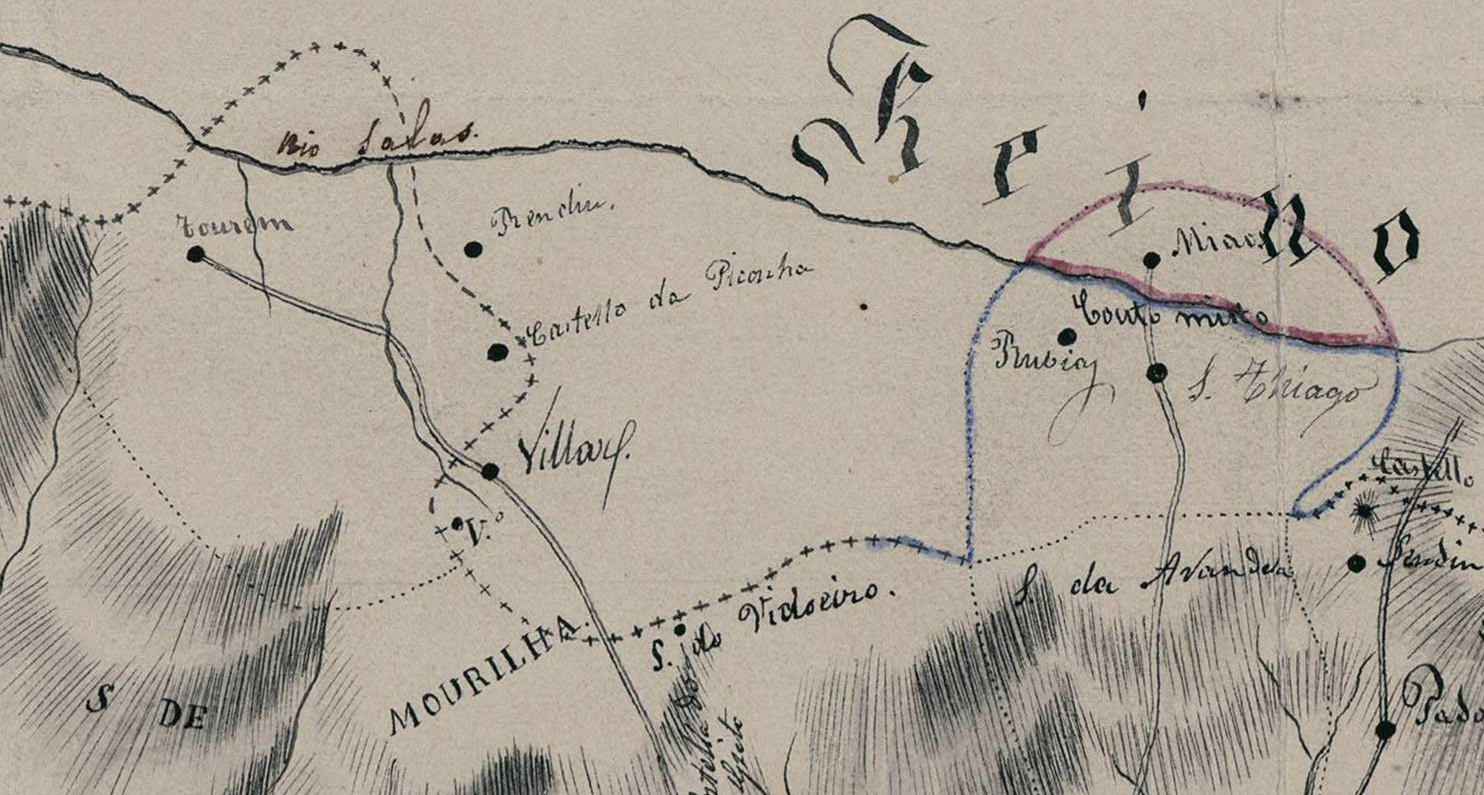
Picoña Castle as part of Tourém on an 1836 chart, with the Couto Misto also visible.

Latter, the Topographic Chart of the Court of Montealegre from 1836, signed by Fidencio Bourman, shows Picoña castle within the limits of Tourém. In accordance with the terms of the Treaty of Lisbon, the Picoña term was extinguished in 1866 with the transfer of the land to Spain.

== See also ==
- Couto Misto
