= Rubiás dos Mixtos =

- Civil parish
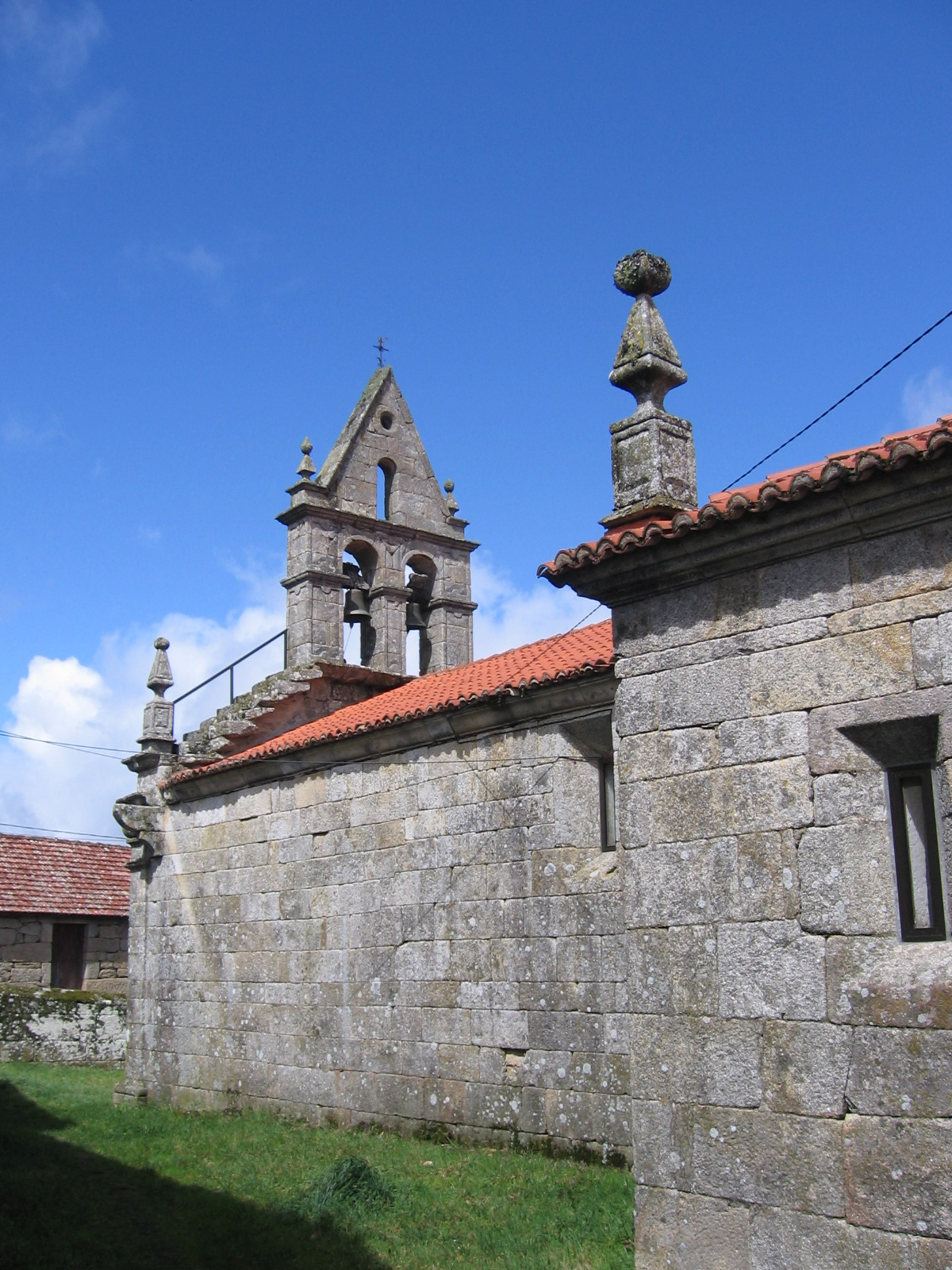
- Church of Santiago de Rubiás
- Interactive map of Rubiás dos Mixtos
- Coordinates: 41.909°N 7.826°W
- Country: Spain
- Community: Galicia
- Province: Ourense
- Municipality: Calvos de Randín

Population (2007)
  - Total: 162

Rubiás dos Mistos is a parish in the municipality of Calvos de Randín, Ourense, Galiza. The census for 2007 showed 162 inhabitants (85 men and 77 women). The parish is formed by two villages, Santiago and Rubiás, and in the past also incorporated the village of Meaus. Until 1868 the three villages formed a de facto independent state called Couto Misto.

== See also ==
- Couto Misto
