= Portuguese invasion of Couto Misto =

1517–18 victory over Spain

Invasion of Couto Misto (1517-1518)
- Part of Portuguese-Galician border conflicts
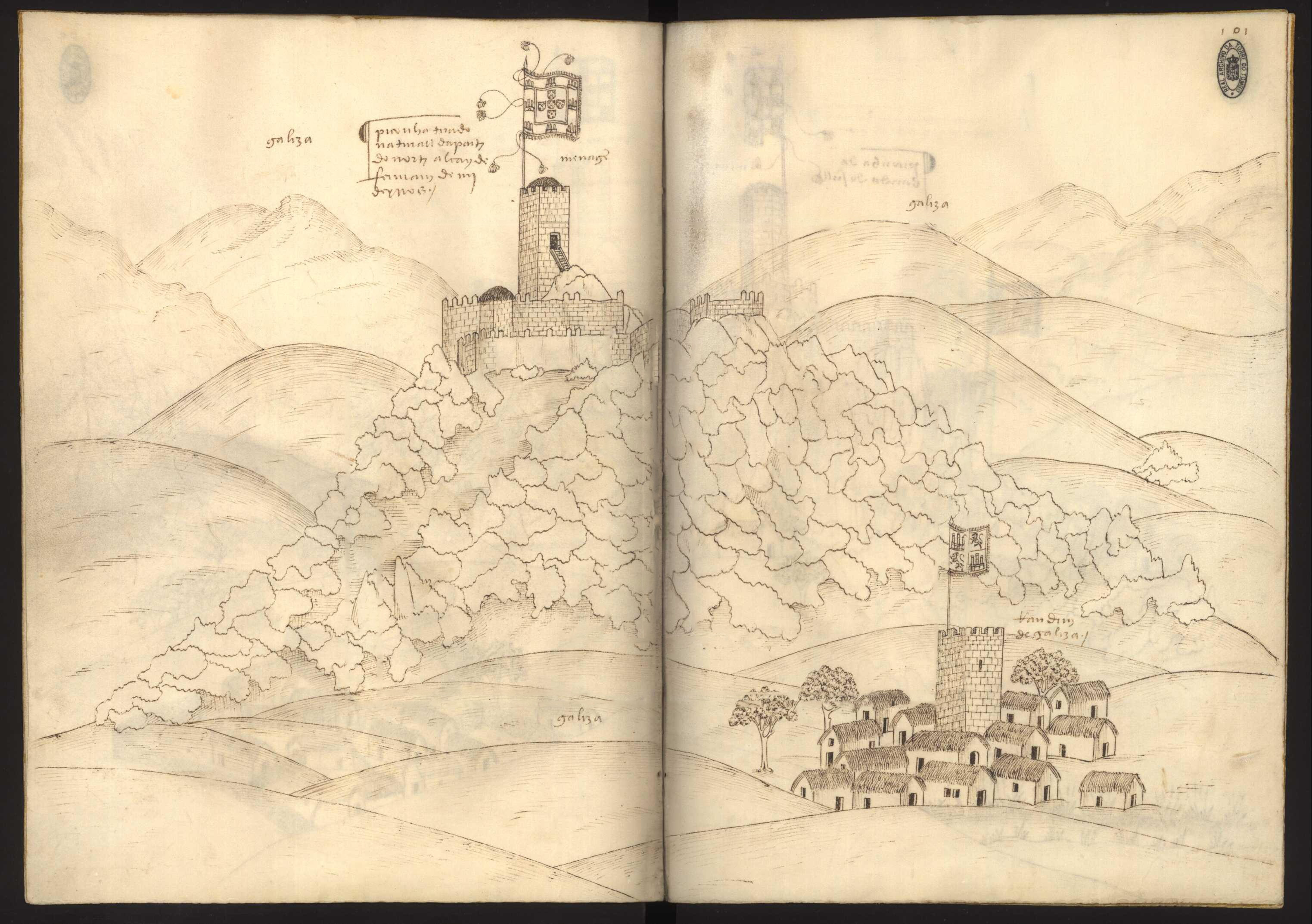
- Picoña Castle, 1509
Date	1517–1518
Location	Couto Misto
Result	Portuguese victory

Belligerents
Kingdom of Portugal	Kingdom of Spain; Kingdom of Galicia; Couto Misto

Commanders and leaders
(Portugal) Antonio de Araújo (Portugal) Lançarote Gonçalves	Pedro Sival; Count of Monterrei

Strength
Unknown	Unknown

Casualties and losses
Unknown	All men killed in Pena

The Portuguese invasion of Couto Misto was a military action that took place between 1517 and 1518, when Portuguese forces, led by Antonio de Araújo, attacked the village of Pena in the region of Couto Misto.

== Background ==
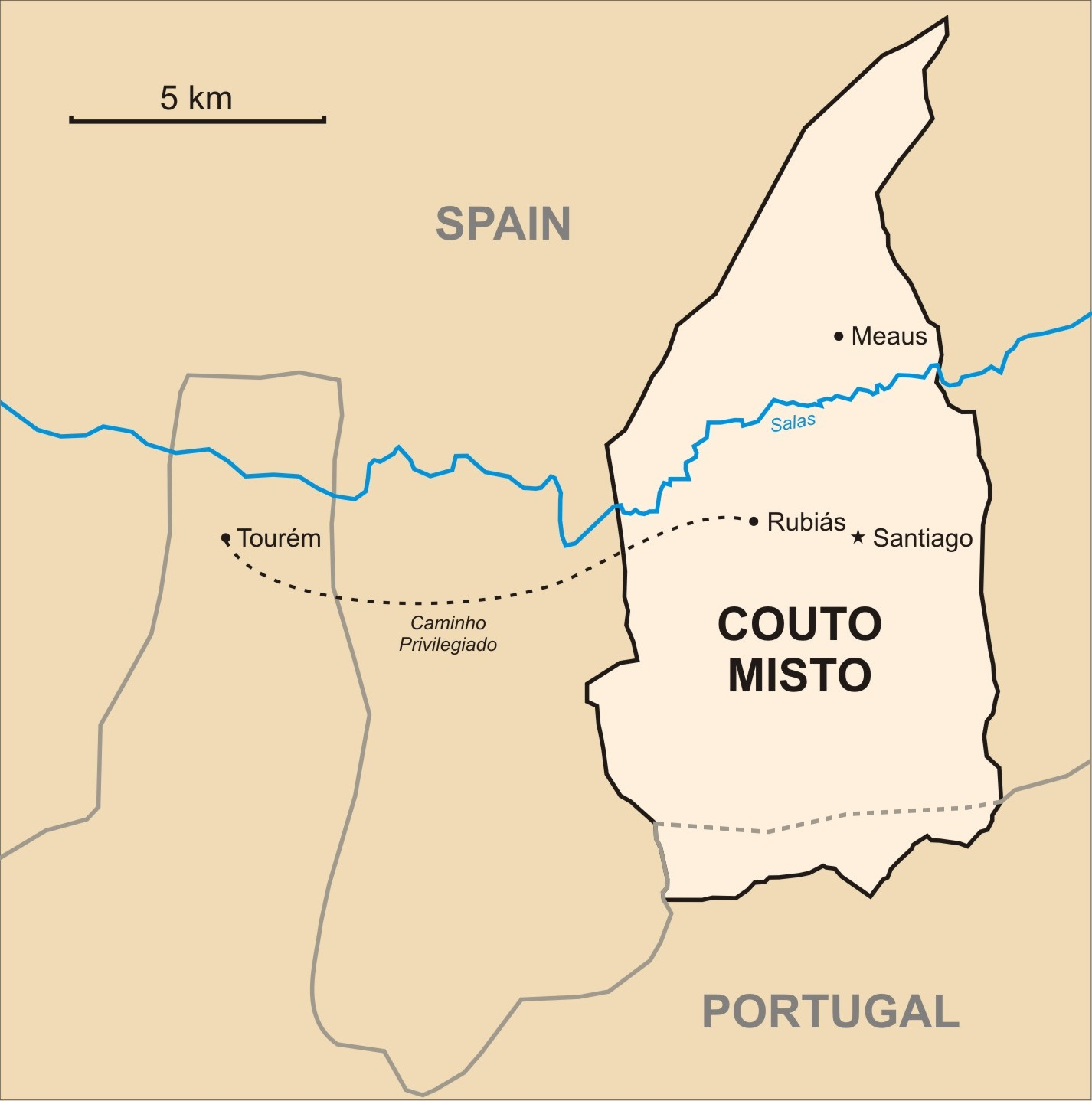
Map of Couto Misto

Couto Misto was associated with the Picoña Castle and, later, the House of Braganza and the House of Monterrei. These houses were involved in numerous disputes between the inhabitants of Couto Misto, Portugal, and Galicia, especially around the year 1518, when tensions rose due to the belief that Couto Misto was a refuge for criminals and a hub for smuggling activities.

== Invasion and Burning of Pena ==
In 1517, a series of violent actions took place in the region, and the village of Pena, situated between Santiago de Rubiás and Vilar, was burned by a Portuguese raiding force. This group, led by commanders from nearby castles such as the Picoña Castle, attacked the village during the night, setting fire to homes and killing all the men. The women and children who survived fled to neighboring villages like Santiago and Rubiás.

The destruction of Pena was part of frequent border disputes between Portugal and Galicia. The Portuguese forces were led by Antonio de Araújo from Picoña Castle and Lançarote Gonçalves from Montalegre Castle. On the Galician side, Pedro Sival, a meiriño (local official) from the House of Monterrei.

== Aftermath ==
In 1518, the inhabitants of Couto Misto sought support from the Count of Monterrei, hoping to resist Portuguese invasions. However, the dynamics of the region began to change, as negotiations slowly brought the Couto Misto's sovereignty into question. The final act of subjugation came in 1868, when the Treaty of Lisbon was signed, dividing the land between Portugal and Spain.
