= Couto Misto =

Former microstate on the Iberian peninsula

Couto Misto Couto Mixto (Galician) Couto Misto (Portuguese) Coto Mixto (Spanish)
- 10th century – 1868
- Flag
- Motto: "Tres Unum Sunt" (Latin) "Three are One"
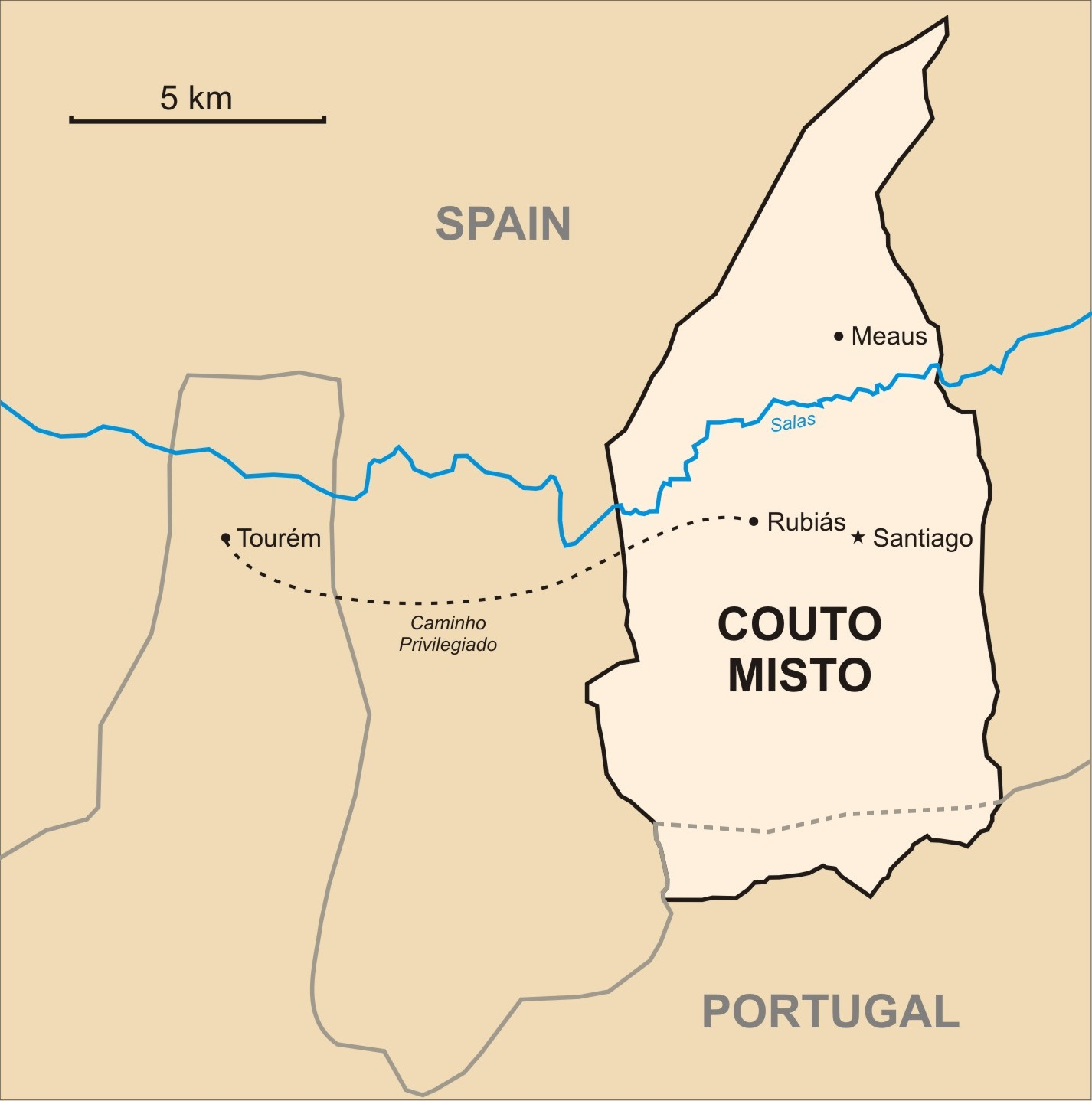
- Map of the Couto Misto
- Status: Microstate
- Capital: Santiago de Rubiás; 41°54′31″N 7°49′59″W
- Common languages: Portuguese, Spanish, Galician
- Religion: Roman Catholic
- Government: Popular assembly
- Judge
  - ca 1860: Delfim Modesto Brandão^{1}
- History
  - Foundation: 10th century
  - Partitioned: September 29, 1864
  - Formal annexation: June 23, 1868

Area
  - Total: 26.7 km^{2} (10.3 sq mi)

Population
  - 1859 estimate: 1,000
Preceded by	Succeeded by
Kingdom of Galicia	Kingdom of Spain; Kingdom of Portugal
- Today part of: Portugal; Spain
- ^{1}Delfim Modesto Brandão (born in Tourém in 1835), was the second to last head of state, taking office in January 1863, according to his memoirs, and followed by one last "Juiz" whose mandate ceased with the partition and annexation of the territory.

Couto Misto (Portuguese: Couto Misto [ˈkotu ˈmiʃtu]; Galician: Couto Mixto; Spanish: Coto Mixto) was an independent microstate on the border between Spain and Portugal. It comprised the villages of Santiago de Rubiás, Rubiás (now in the Spanish municipality of Calvos de Randín), and Meaus (now in the Spanish municipality of Baltar), all in the Salas Valley, Ourense, Galicia. The territory of the Couto Misto also included a small uninhabited strip now part of the Portuguese municipality of Montalegre.

As a result of complex medieval manorial relations, this land eluded both Portuguese and Spanish control for centuries, actually operating as a sovereign state in its own right until the 1864 Treaty of Lisbon that partitioned the territory between Spain (which annexed most of the land including the three villages) and Portugal (which remained with a smaller uninhabited strip of land). As a de facto independent country, the inhabitants of the Couto Misto had many privileges, including exemption from military service and taxes, and could grant asylum to outsiders and deny access to any foreign military contingent.

== Origins ==
Even though the origins of the Couto Misto remain unclear, the name of this territory is revealing. The term couto (coto in Spanish) comes from the Latin cautēs ("pointed rock"), which refers generally to an area demarcated with boundary stones (cautos lapideos). The term initially referred to the stones used to mark the boundaries of a given territory, but in the Middle Ages it was used to refer to a special set of territories which, under the feudal system, were exempt from the authority of the king, holding a special economic, political, and judicial regime. The special jurisdiction of the coutos was maintained through custom and given privileges, sustaining truly independent states within its boundaries that were defended by guards (couteiros).

The adjective misto, meaning "mixed" or "joint", probably refers to the dual manorial links of this territory with the feudal lords from the Duchy of Braganza and the earldom of Monte-Rei. Another interpretation, sustained by oral traditions and by some medieval documents (where the terms mystigos or místicos meaning mystical are used), links the origin of the Couto with the legend of a pregnant fugitive princess, allegedly (Saint) Ilduara Eriz, who found refuge in the villages of this territory and who was to give birth to (Saint) Rudesind Guterri, granting privileges to its inhabitants in gratitude. This explanation may well be based on historical facts, as Ilduaria Eriz, one of the most important Galician aristocrats of the late 9th/early 10th century, held the regions of Limia, where the Couto is located, and also what today is northern Portugal, under her rule. Also, the location of Rudesind's birth has actually been placed in the Salas Valley.

Several historians have dated the origins of the Couto in the same period as the emergence of the Kingdom of Portugal, somewhere around the 12th century, which is supported by documents that date back to the early 14th century. Initially the Couto was under the jurisdiction of Piconha Castle (originally Portuguese, but now within Spanish territory), but it eventually became tied to the noble houses of Braganza and Monte-Rei. With the extinction of coutos in Portugal, initiated in 1692, and concluded in 1790, the Couto Misto was freed from its feudal ties, functioning as a de facto independent state up to its partition and annexation in 1868.

== Privileges ==
The privileges of Couto Misto included nationality, taxes, military service, the right to bear arms, official postage stamps, self-government, right of asylum, fairs and markets, road rights of way and crops.

== Current status ==
As the three villages of the Couto Misto are now separated in two different municipalities, the main reminder of the Couto Misto in the area are the common land community trusts that continue to function in each of the villages under the old system of popular assembly. All three commons trusts were established in 1976, and incorporate 654 hectares (6.54 km^{2}) for Rubiás, 452 hectares (4.52 km^{2}) for Santiago de Rubiás and 311 hectares (3.11 km^{2}) for Meaus. This common land represents most of the territory of the former Couto Misto. The trusts also maintain the claim of rights of common over the strip of land formerly part of the Couto Misto and now part of the Portuguese municipality of Montalegre. A complex legal case over a wind farm on the disputed strip was settled with Enersis, a multinational electric power corporation, with a compensation of €140,000 toward the trusts. Income from the common land trusts has had significant importance in community development over the past decades.

Outside interest in the Couto re-emerged in the mid-1990s, leading to new research and subsequent academic publications. A joint summer program was organized by the University of Vigo and the University of Trás-os-Montes and Alto Douro in 1999 focusing on the history of the Couto. In 1998, the nonprofit Asociación de Amigos do Couto Mixto (Couto Misto Friendship Association) was established, followed in 2003 by the Asociación de Veciños do Couto Mixto (Couto Misto Community Association). Both organizations have reestablished the figure of the Homens de Acordo, with one person representing each village, and that of the Juiz Honorário (Honorary Judge) who is named each year in a ceremony held in the Church of Santiago.

Political moves regarding the Couto Misto have led to debates and resolutions in the Galician, Spanish and European Parliaments. In May 2007, a motion (Proposición no de ley) was discussed and approved (with 303 votes in favour) by the Spanish Parliament recognizing the singularity of the Couto Mixto as a historical and cultural enclave, and calling for measures that allow for the social and economic development of the territory. At the same time, a similar motion was approved by the Galician Parliament, also recognizing the historical singularity of the Couto. In 2008, a written question was presented at the European Parliament regarding the European Union's contribution to the revival of the Couto Mixto, defined as an "institution which was politically and administratively independent of the Spanish and Portuguese crowns". In 2016, a request was made for the inhabitants of the Couto to be granted Portuguese and Spanish dual citizenship following the earlier case of Olivenza.

== Gallery ==
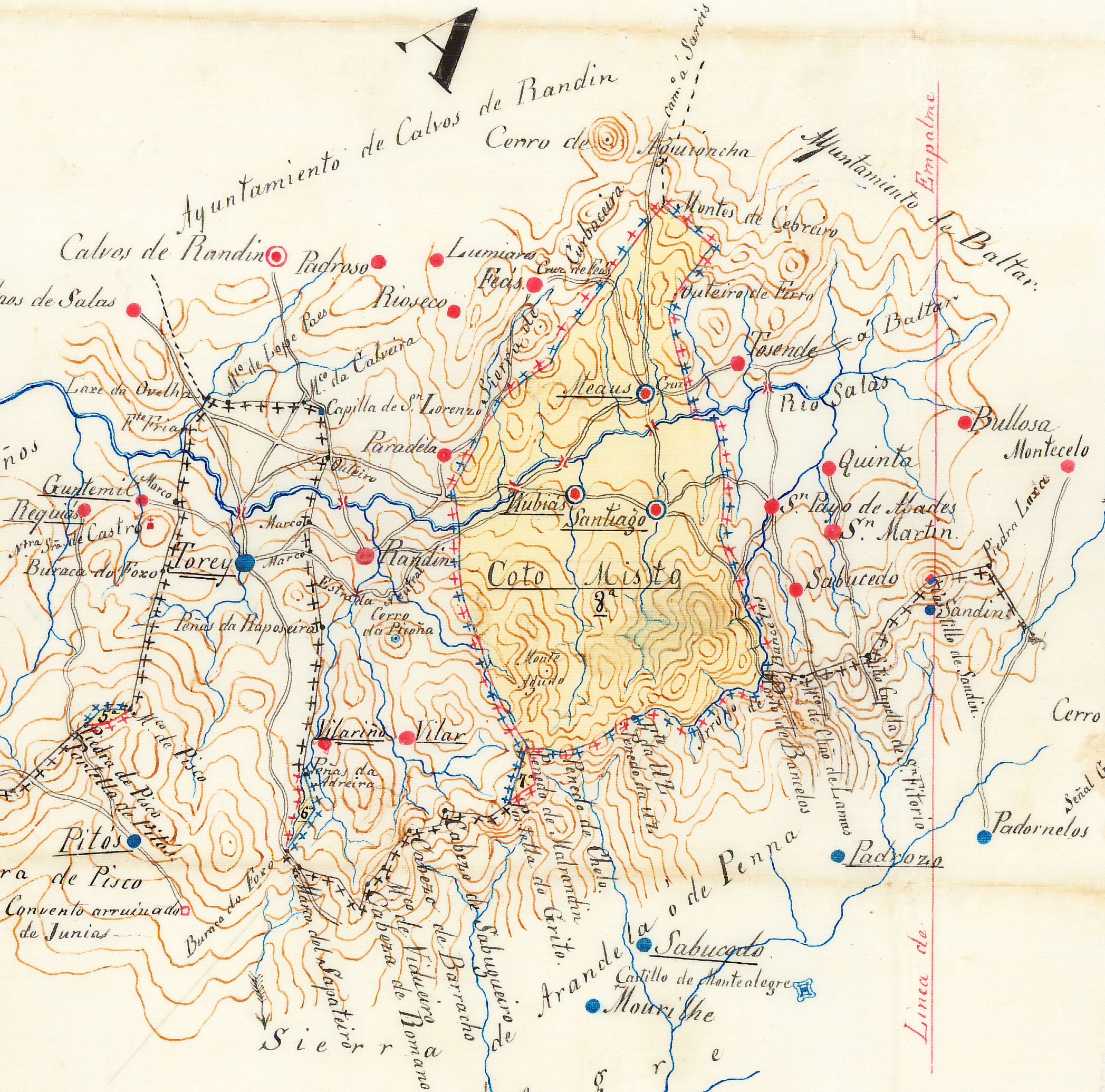
1863 map of the Couto Misto

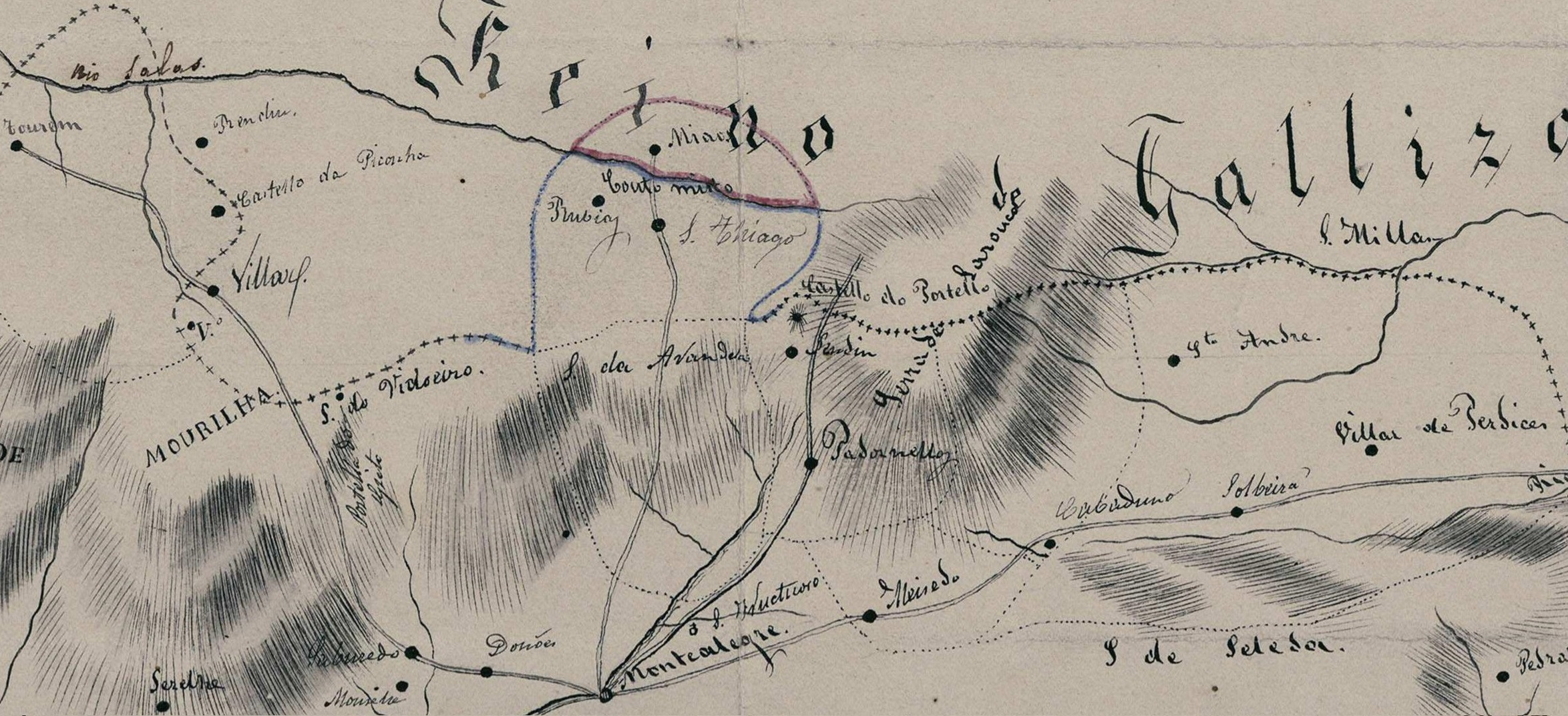
Detail of the topographic map of Julgado de Montealegre (1836), by Fidencio Bourman, showing the Couto Misto

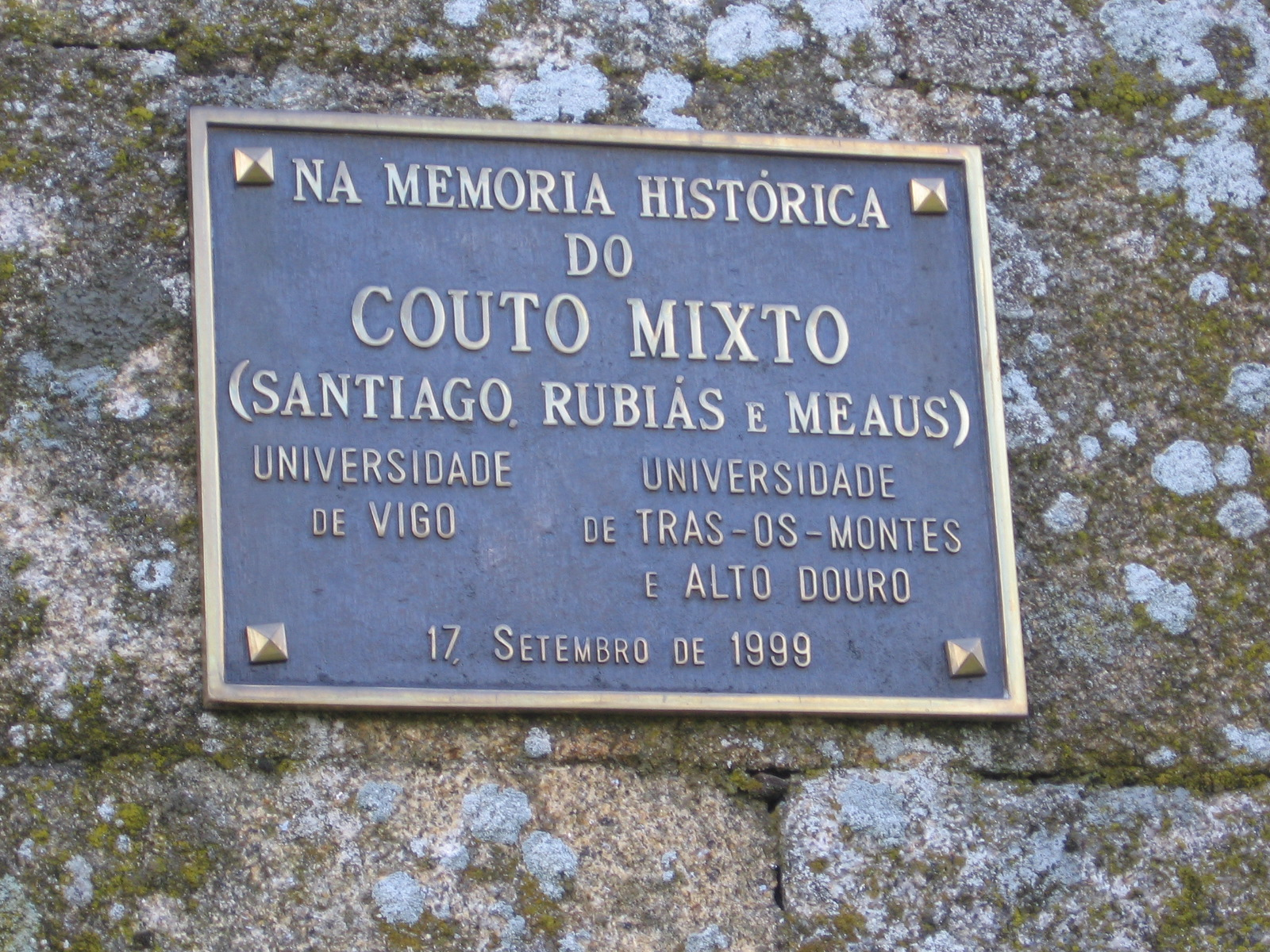
Commemorative plaque on the church of Santiago de Rubiás

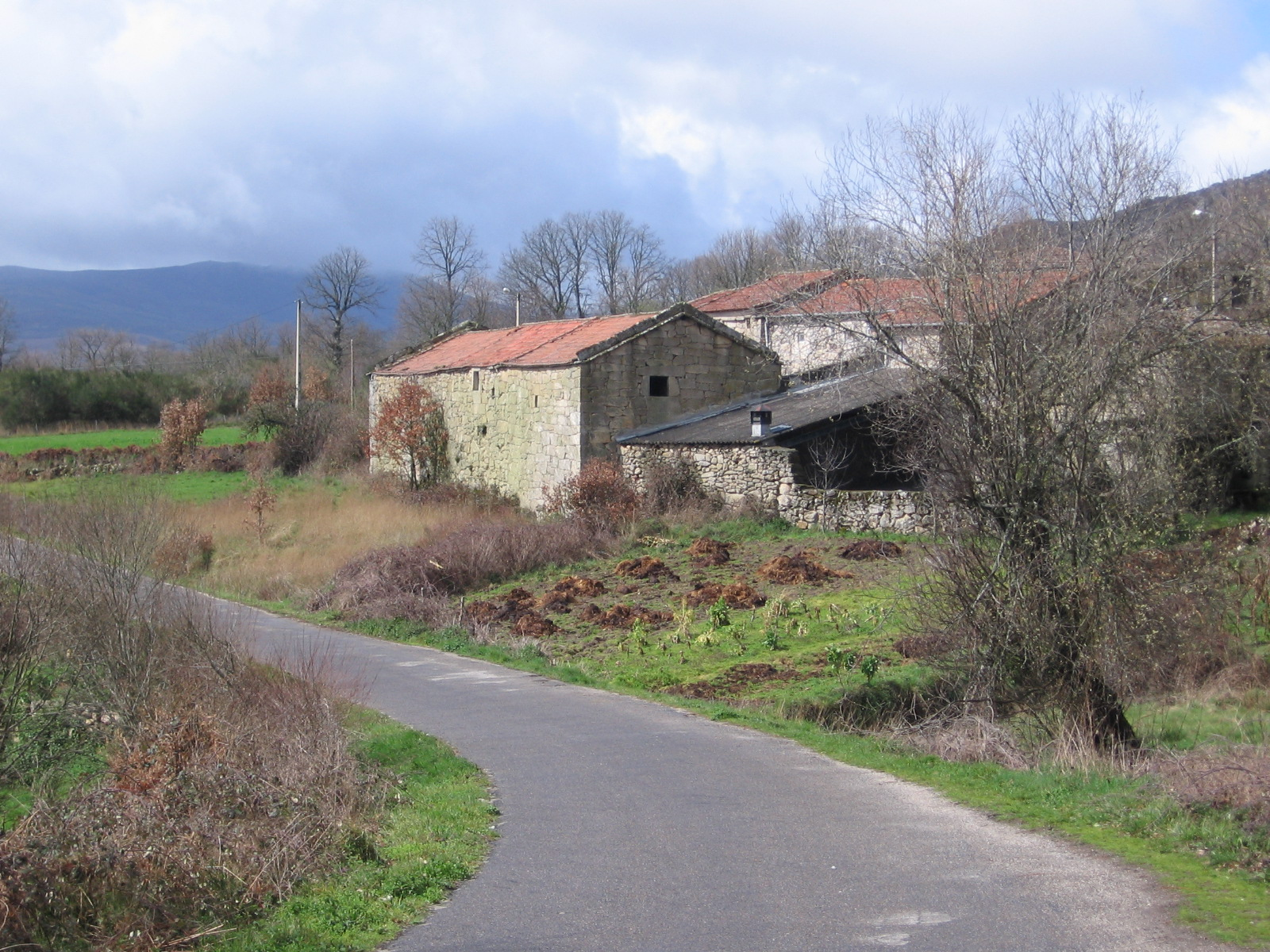
A view of Meaus, one of the three villages that composed the Couto Mixto

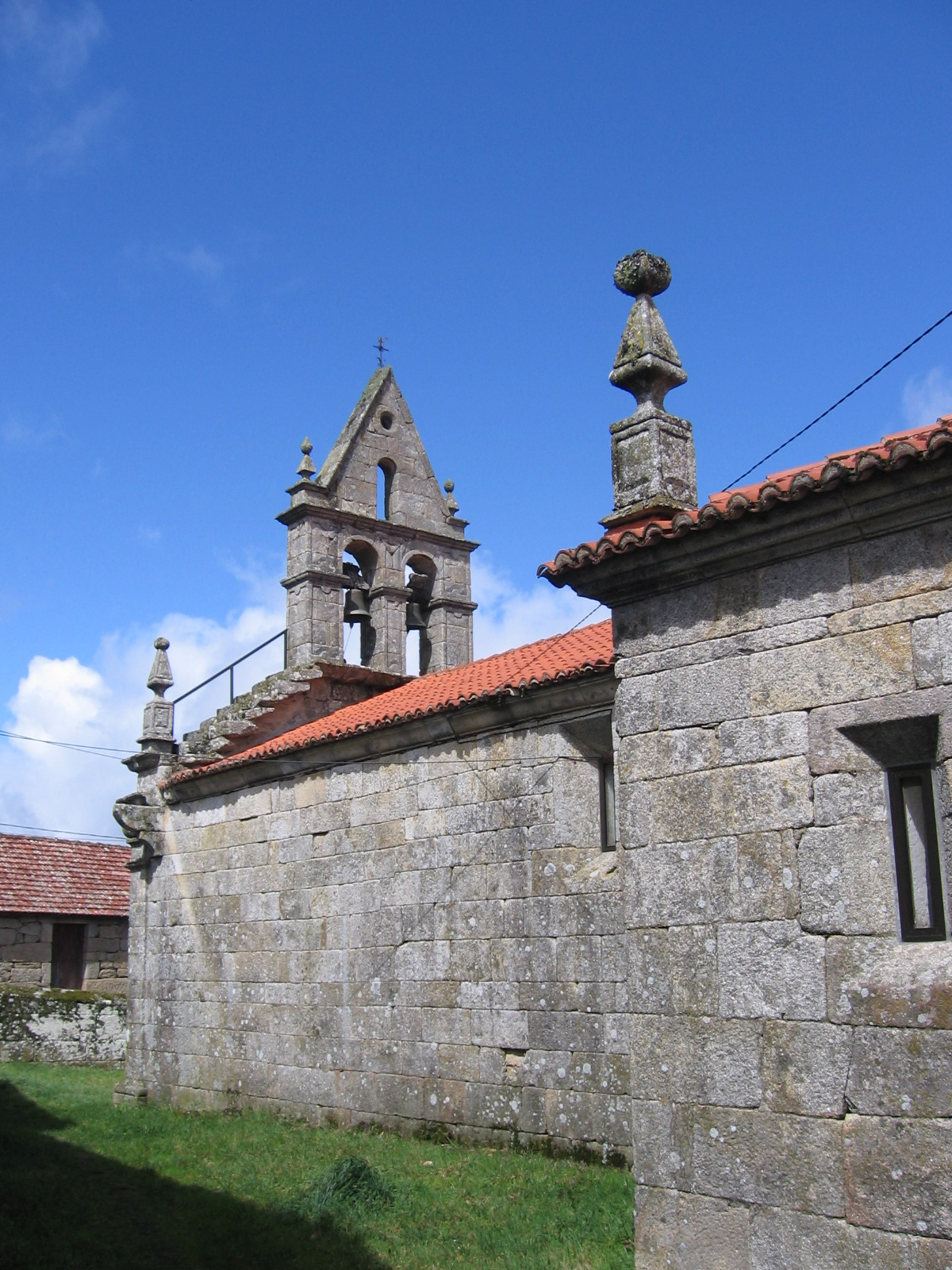
Church of Santiago de Rubiás, one of the three villages that composed the Couto Mixto

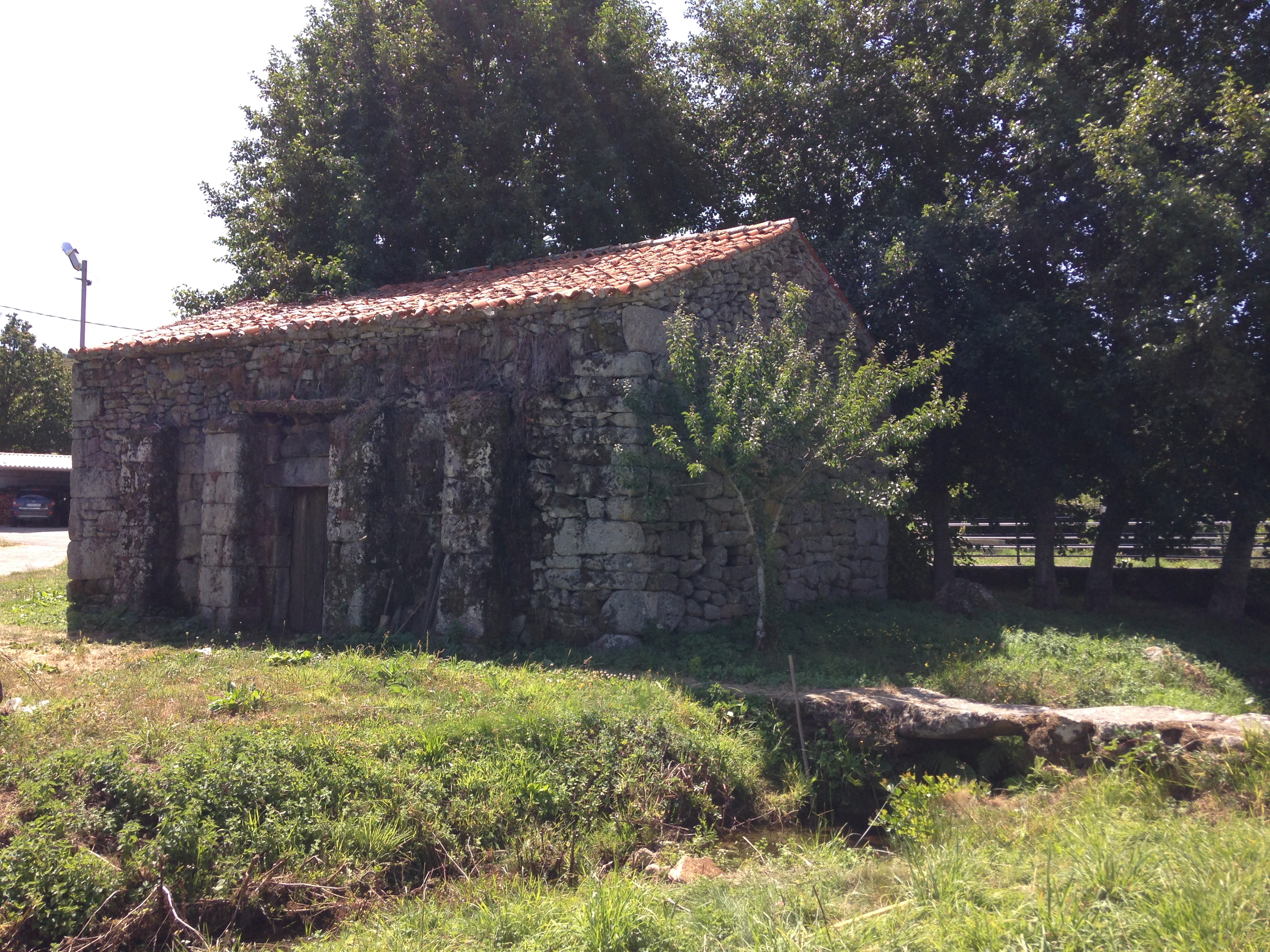
Part of the Caminho Privilegiado in Santiago de Rubiás

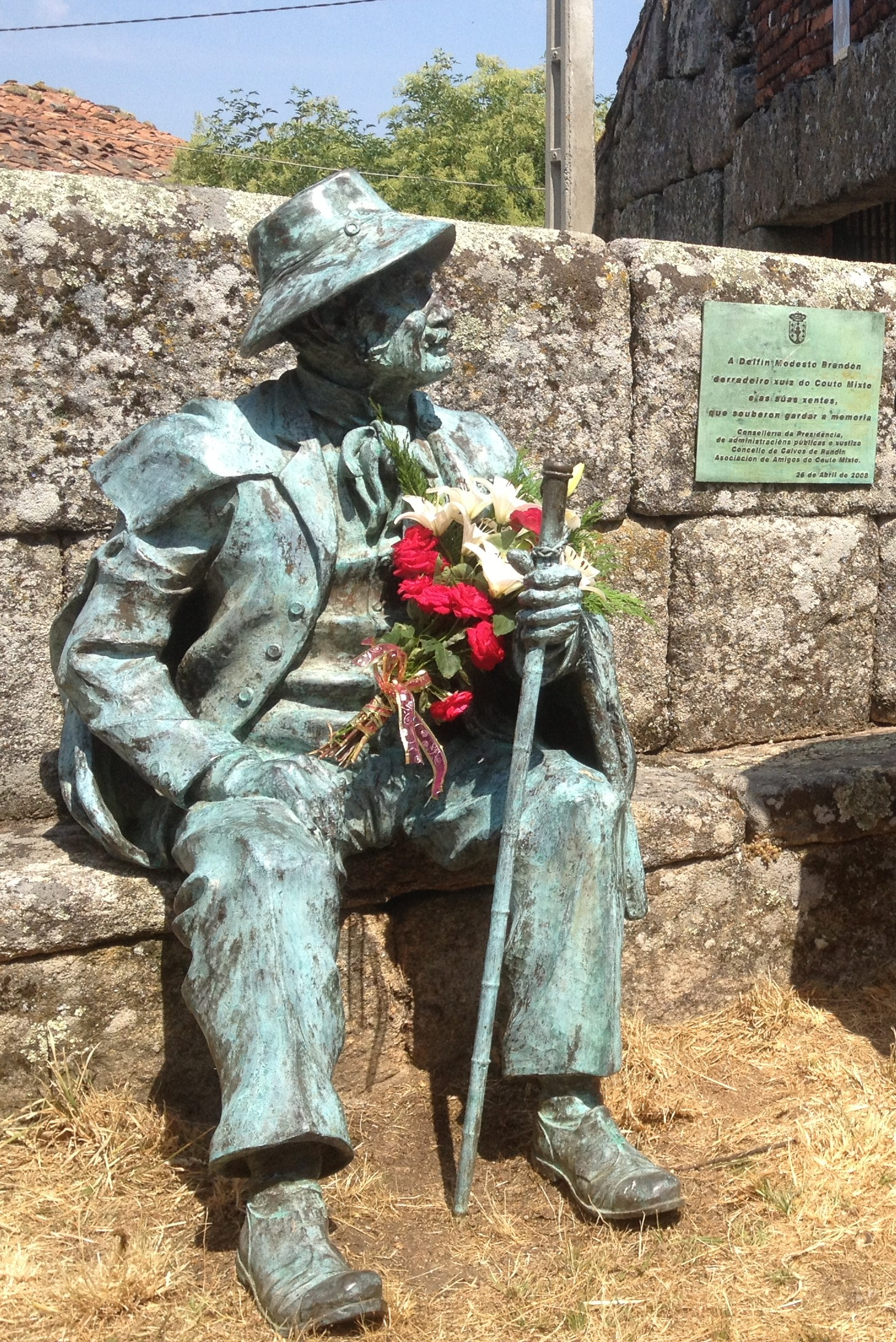
Statue of Delfim Modesto Brandão, penultimate Juiz of the Couto Misto

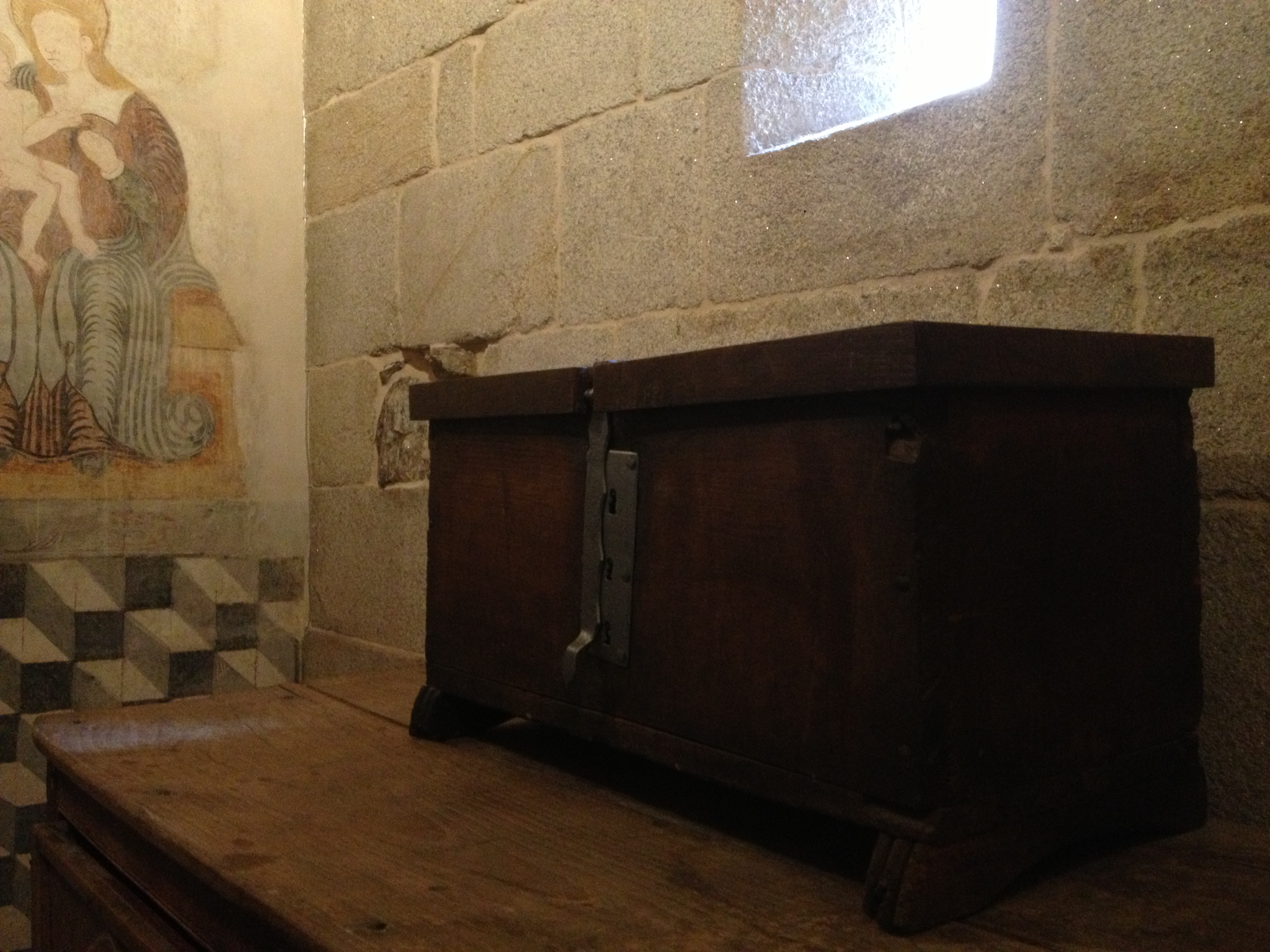
Restored Chest of the Three Keys

== See also ==
- Delfim Modesto Brandão
- Flag of the Couto Misto
- List of historical unrecognized states
- Microstate
- Portuguese invasion of Couto Misto
