= Flag of the Couto Misto =

Flag

Couto Misto
- Use: National flag
- Proportion: 1:1
- Adopted: Unknown
- Design: Two vertical bands, one of white (hoist side) and one of blue.

The flag of the Couto Misto, as described by the second to last head of state Delfim Modesto Brandão in his memoirs, is formed by two vertical bands, one of white (hoist side) and one of blue.

The origin of the flag is unknown, even though it resembles the one used by Portugal between 1830 and 1910, with its colors inverted. Its square proportions could indicate an earlier origin.

== See also ==
- Delfim Modesto Brandão
- Couto Misto
