= Salas (Galiza) =

River in Spain

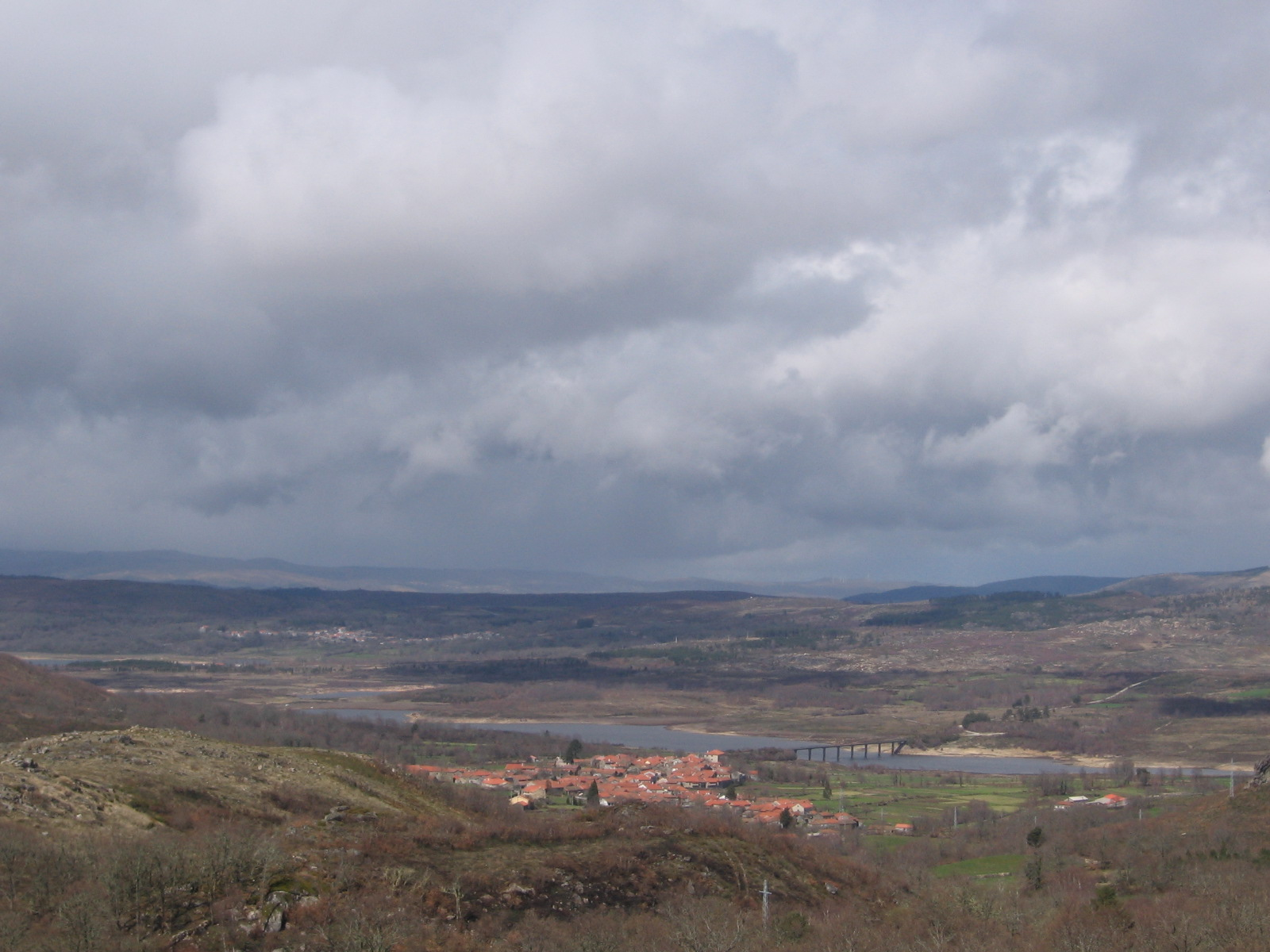
The Salas River at Tourem, Portugal

The Salas River (Galician pronunciation: [ˈsalɐs]; Spanish pronunciation: [ˈsalas]; Portuguese pronunciation: [ˈsalɐʃ]) is a tributary of the Lima. It rises in the Larouco mountains (pt:Serra do Larouco), within the municipality of Baltar, Ourense, Galicia. It flows through the territory of the Couto Misto, a former independent state, and the Portuguese village of Tourém (pt:Tourém) before being dammed up by the Encoro de Salas, back in Spain. It flows into the Limia River near the town of Lobios.
