= Delfim Modesto Brandão =

Juiz of the Couto Misto and Spanish politician

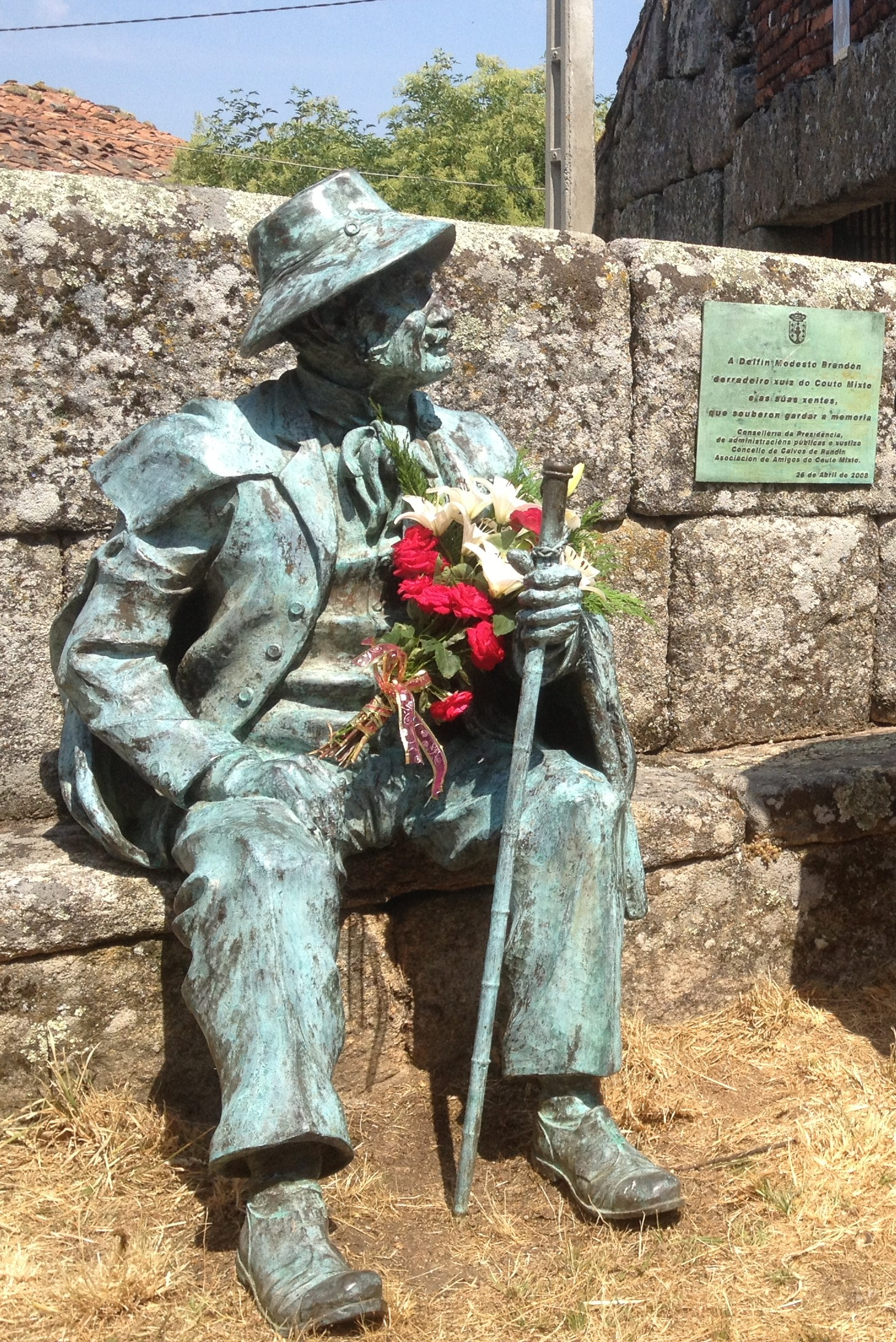

Civil and Governative Judge of the Couto Misto
- In office January 1863 – ca 1865

Personal details
- Born: c. 1835 Tourém, Kingdom of Portugal
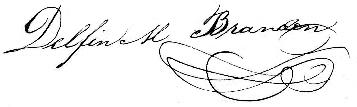
- Signature

Delfim Modesto Brandão (c. 1835 – ?), also spelled with Galician orthography as Delfín Modesto Brandón, was the penultimate "Juiz" (head of state) of the Couto Misto. He took office in January 1863, according to his memoirs. He was followed by one last "Juiz" whose mandate ceased with the partition and formal annexation of the territory by Spain and Portugal on June 23, 1868.

He was born in Tourém, a parish of the Portuguese municipality of Montalegre. He moved to the bordering Couto Misto. At age 28, he served as "Civil and Governative Judge" (formal title of the heads of state of the Couto Misto), after he was elected to end abuses and breaches of the microstate's sovereignty by Portuguese and Spanish authorities. He resigned from office when the partition and annexation of the territory was imminent.

In 1904 he completed a memoir with his account of the last decades of the Couto Misto up to its extinction. These memoirs were published in Spanish in 1907 as Interesante Historieta del Coto Mixto.

He served as an officer ("Oficial quinto") in the Spanish postal administration of Aguadilla, Puerto Rico between 1881 and 1885.

== See also ==
- Couto Misto
