= Microstates and the United Nations =

The United Nations (UN) has many microstate members. As of 1980, microstates made up one-quarter of the United Nations membership. The European microstates of Andorra, Monaco, Liechtenstein, and San Marino were accepted into the U.N. by acclamation from 1990 to 1993.

== Controversy ==
Microstates' U.N. membership has been controversial, on the grounds that their ability to participate in U.N. discussions and decisions and contribute meaningfully to the goals of the organization is limited. For example, the Maldives, when admitted to the U.N., had a population of only about 100,000 and did not have a delegation present at the U.N. when United Nations General Assembly Resolution 2758 was voted on, which replaced the Republic of China with the People's Republic of China. One concern with regard to admitting microstates to membership is "debasement of the coinage of membership" and loss of prestige of the organization. Another concern is that a warship, or an airplane-load of mercenaries, could easily establish effective control over an island microstate, with the vote in the U.N. General Assembly, which serves as a sounding board for "world public opinion", being an enticement to gain dominance over such a country.

In addition to the burdens of state for recognized microstates is the temptation to confuse border controls between legitimate entities by those presenting with illegitimate passports. The European Union reports three such types of passports - fantasy, camouflage, and not recognized. In the first instance, many self-proclaimed microstates and self-identified groups issue passport-type documents for the purposes of fostering international legitimacy, such as the diplomatic passport of Comité International pour la Protection des Droits de l'Homme (CIPDH) a group presenting itself as a UN agency, and numerous North American First Nations. In the second circumstance, a state which no longer exists in international eyes may persist as a landless rump or a government-in-exile which continues to issue travel documents for its personnel or adherents (like the Soviet Union between 16 December & 26 December 1991 and the Polish government-in-exile). These may also be forgeries to conceal identities. The third example is unrecognized territories, such as Turkish Republic of Northern Cyprus.
