= Meaus =

- Village
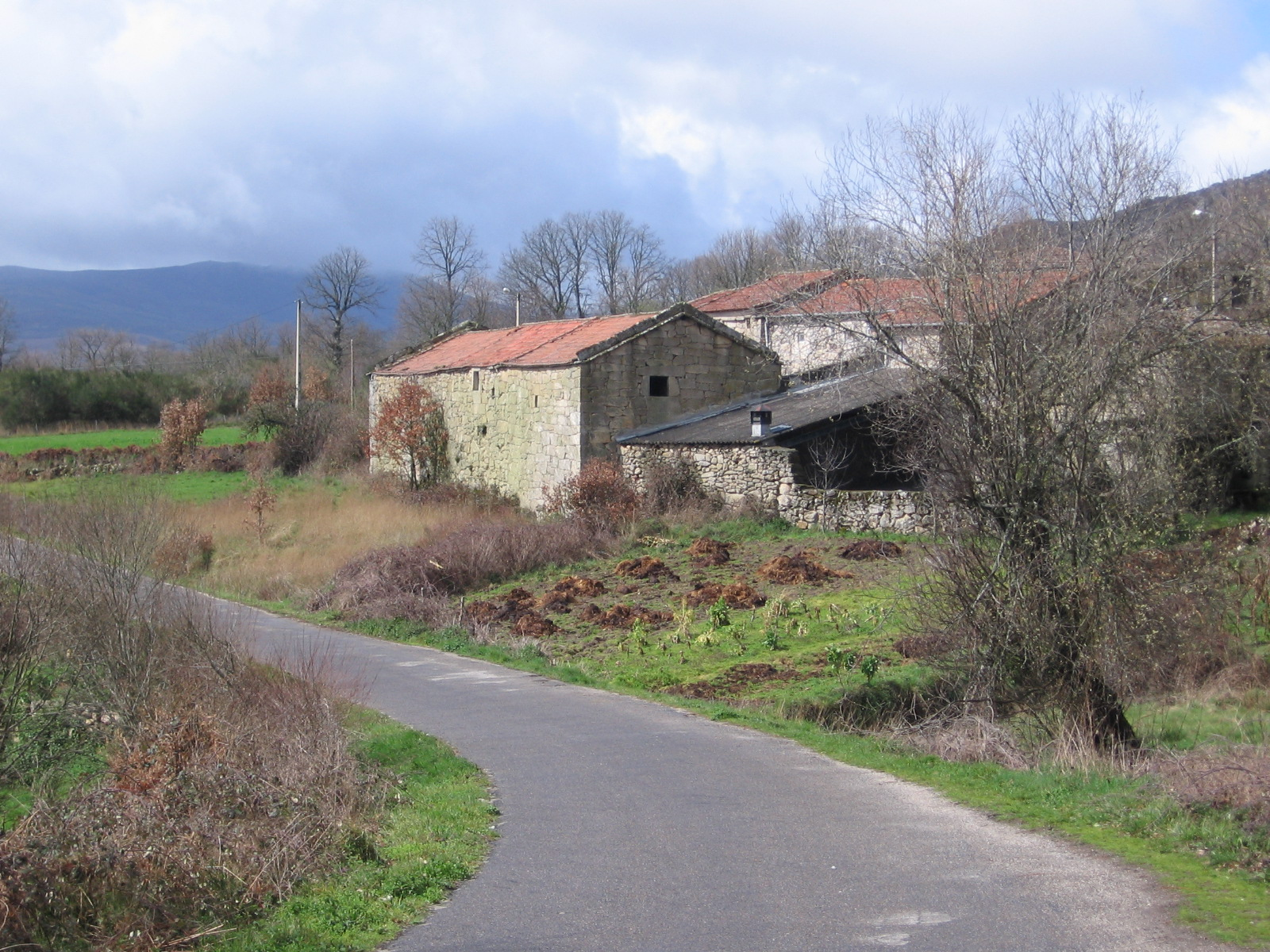
- A view of Meaus

- Location of Meaus in Spain.
- Coordinates: 41.928°N 7.822°W
- Country: Spain
- Autonomous Community: Galicia
- Province: Ourense
- Municipality: Baltar

Population (2007)
  - Total: 38

Meaus is a village in the municipality of Baltar, Ourense, Galiza. The census for 2007 showed 38 inhabitants (19 men and 19 women). Until 1868 it formed with Santiago and Rubiás a de facto independent state called Couto Misto.

== See also ==
- Couto Misto
