= Rubiás =

Village in Galiza, Spain

Coordinates: 41.909°N 7.833°W

Rubiás is a village in the municipality of Calvos de Randín, Ourense, Galiza, Spain. The census for 2019 showed that the town has 58 people, with 29 men and 29 women. Until 1868 it formed with Santiago de Rubiás and Meaus the de facto independent state Couto Misto.

== See also ==
- Couto Misto
