= Microstate =

Sovereign state having a very small population or very small land area

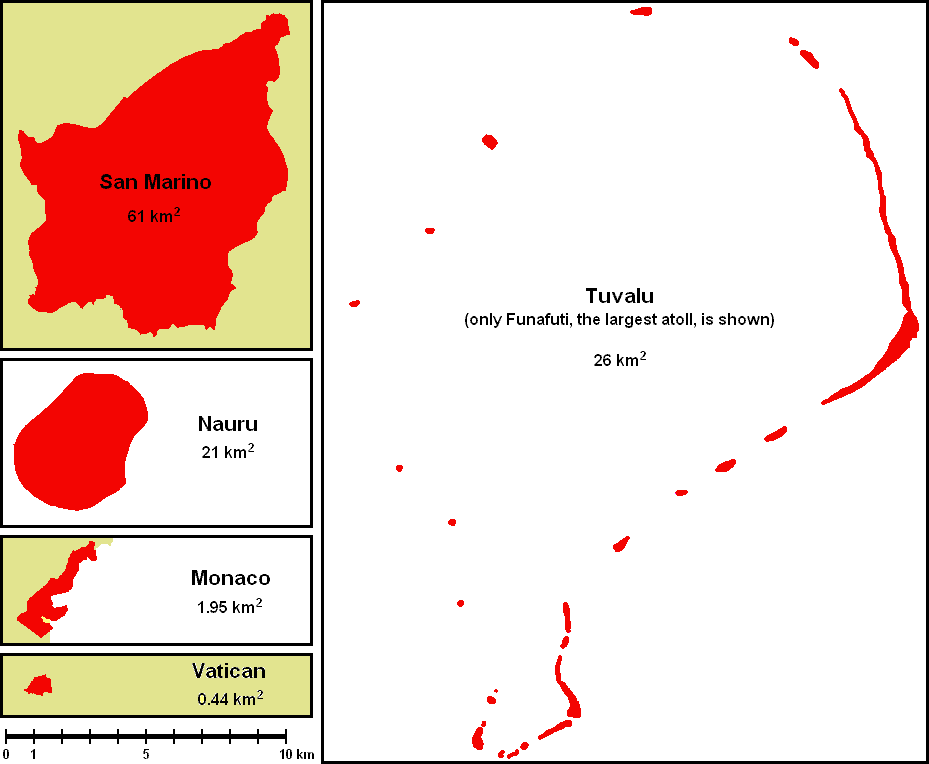
The world's five smallest sovereign states by area, from largest to smallest: San Marino, Tuvalu, Nauru, Monaco, and Vatican City shown in the same scale for size comparison

Map of the smallest states in the world by population or land area

A microstate or ministate is a sovereign state having a very small population or land area, usually both. However, the meanings of "state" and "very small" are not well-defined in international law. Some recent attempts to define microstates have focused on identifying qualitative features that are linked to their size and population, such as partial delegation of their sovereignty to larger states, such as for international defense.

Commonly accepted examples of microstates include five historic European microstates: Andorra, Liechtenstein, Monaco, San Marino, and Vatican City (also called the Holy See). Malta and Luxembourg are sometimes included in that list but are generally considered too populous to be genuine microstates. Other examples are small, isolated island states in the Pacific Ocean such as Nauru (officially the Republic of Naoero), Palau, Niue, the Cook Islands and Tuvalu. Some small Caribbean countries such as Saint Kitts and Nevis, Barbados, Antigua and Barbuda, Grenada, and Saint Vincent and the Grenadines may be considered microstates by some but are often not included due to them being grouped together as small island countries.

While Singapore and Bahrain are sometimes considered microstates, some argue they are too populous, self-reliant, or powerful to fit the definition, with their island status also playing an important factor. In contrast, countries such as Brunei, Iceland, and Guyana have significant land mass but small populations. The smallest political entity recognized as a sovereign state is Vatican City, with fewer than 1,000 residents and an area of only 49 hectares (120 acres). Some microstates – such as Singapore, Monaco and Vatican City – are more commonly described as city-states, which consists of a single municipality.

== Definitions ==
=== Quantitative ===
Most scholars identify microstates by using a quantitative threshold and applying it to either one variable (such as the size of its territory or population) or a composite of different variables. While it is agreed that microstates are the smallest of all states, there is no consensus on what variable (or variables) or cut-off point should be used to determine which political units should be labelled as "microstates" (as opposed to small "normal" states). According to some scholars the quantitative approach to defining microstates suffers from such problems as "inconsistency, arbitrariness, vagueness and inability to meaningfully isolate qualitatively distinct political units".

=== Qualitative ===
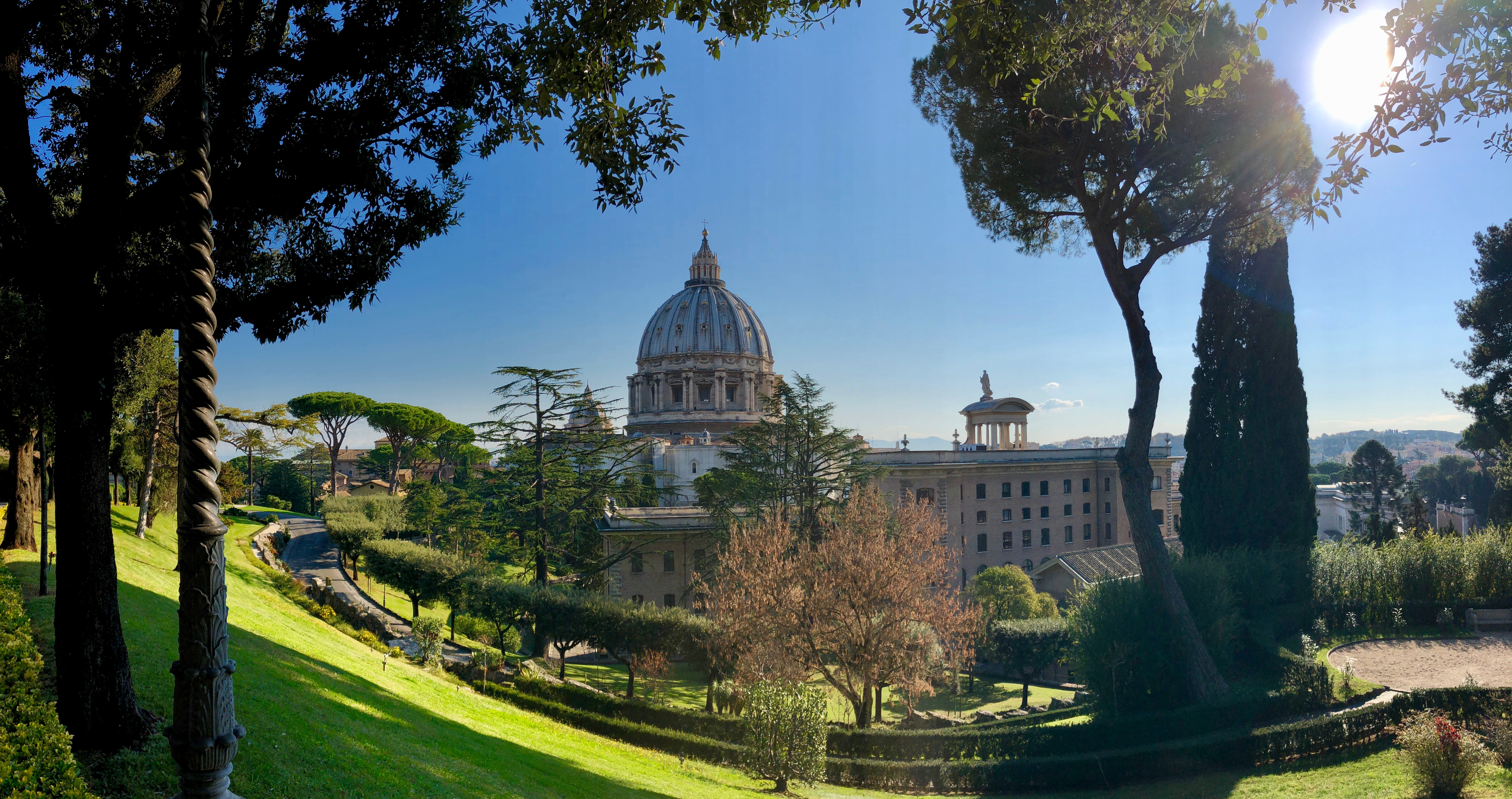
Vatican City, the smallest independent country in the world, with an area of 0.49 km^{2} (120 acres)

Some academics have suggested defining microstates according to the unique features that are linked to their geographic or demographic smallness. Newer approaches have proposed looking at the behaviour or capacity to operate in the international arena in order to determine which states should deserve the microstate label. Yet, it has been argued that such approaches could lead to either confusing microstates with weak states (or failed states) or relying too much on subjective perceptions.

An alternative approach is to define microstates as "modern protected states". According to the definition proposed by Dumienski (2014): "microstates are modern protected states, i.e. sovereign states that have been able to unilaterally depute certain attributes of sovereignty to larger powers in exchange for benign protection of their political and economic viability against their geographic or demographic constraints." Adopting this approach permits limiting the number of microstates and separating them from both small states and autonomies or dependencies.

The smallest political unit recognized as a sovereign state is the Vatican City, though its precise status is sometimes disputed, e.g., Maurice Mendelson argued in 1972 that "[i]n two respects it may be doubted whether the territorial entity, the Vatican City, meets the traditional criteria of statehood".

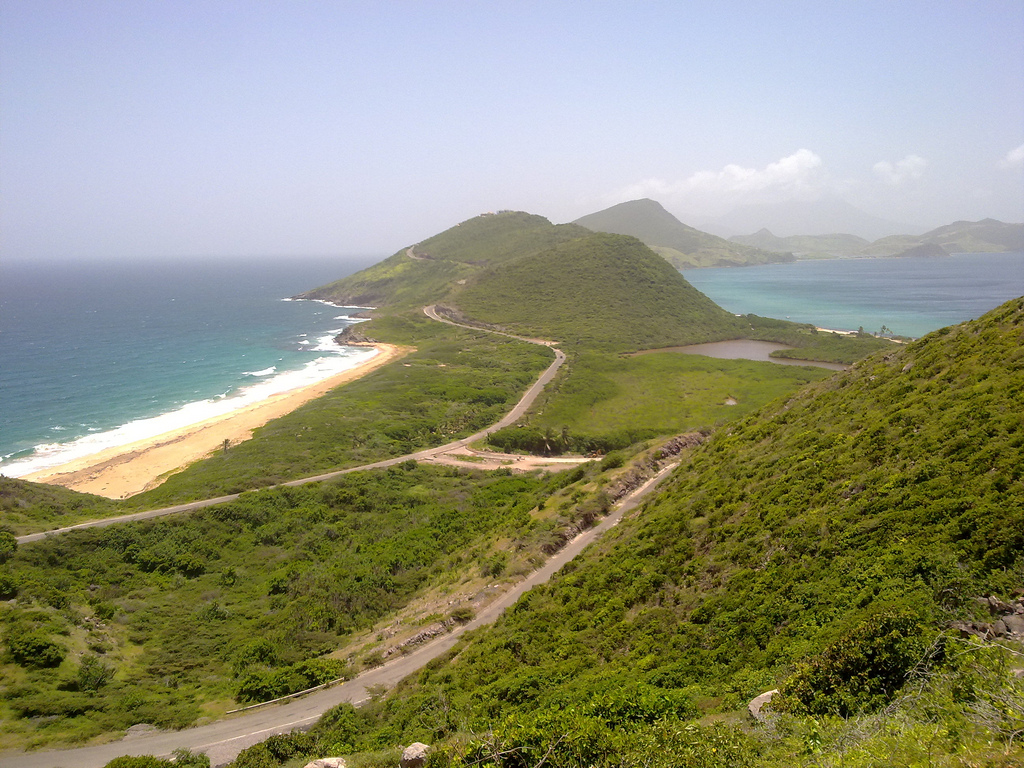
St. Kitts and Nevis in the Caribbean Sea, the smallest independent country in the Americas with 261 km^{2} (101 sq mi)

== Politics ==
Statistical research has shown that microstates are more likely to be democracies than larger states. In 2012, Freedom House classified 86% of the countries with fewer than 500,000 inhabitants as "free". This shows that countries with small populations often had a high degree of political freedom and civil liberties, which is one of the hallmarks of democracies. Some scholars have taken the statistical correlation between small size and democracy as a sign that smallness is beneficial to the development of a democratic political system, mentioning social cohesiveness, opportunities for direct communication and homogeneity of interests as possible explanations for why this is the case.

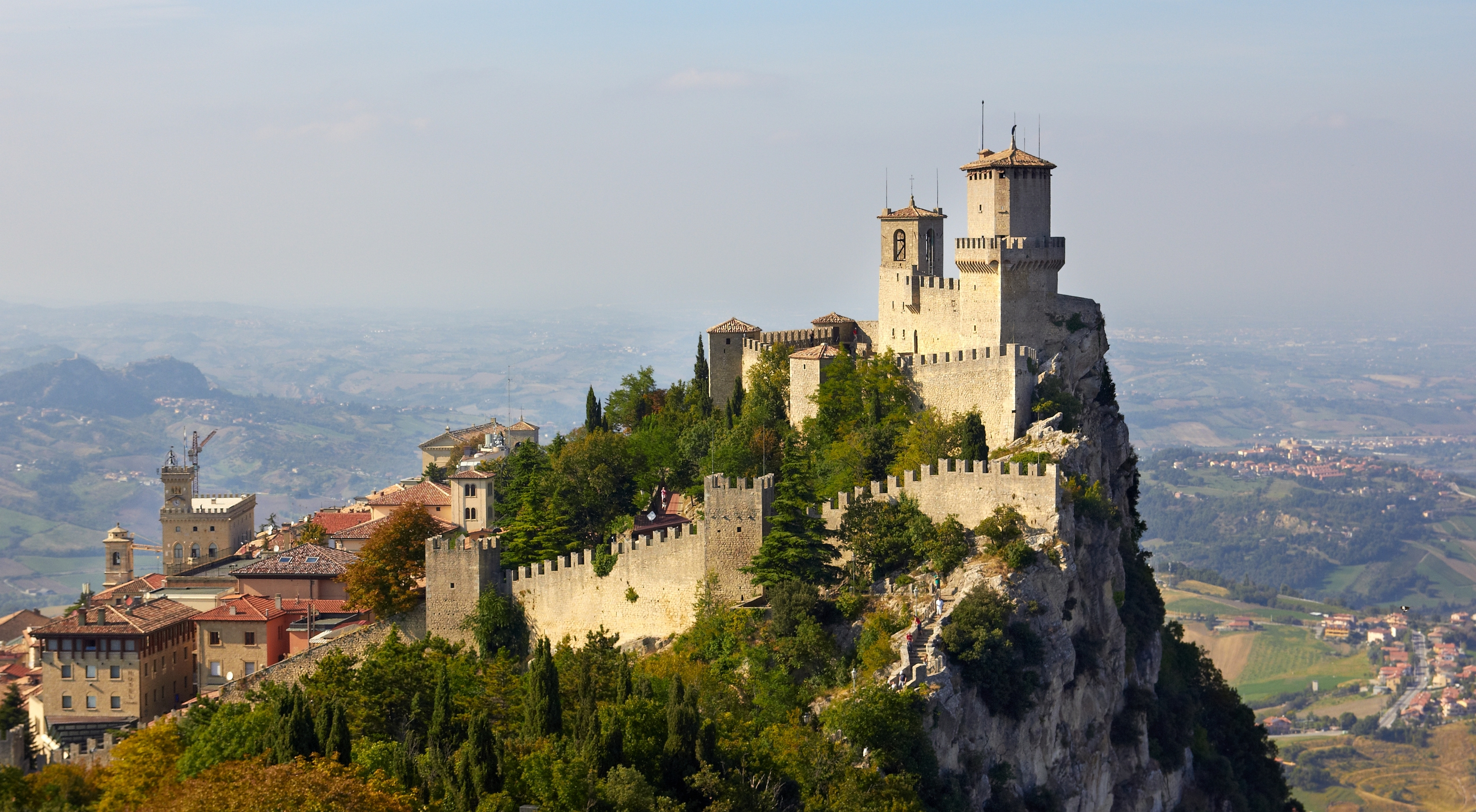
San Marino, the 3rd smallest independent country in Europe and the oldest republic in the world with 61.2 km^{2} (23.6 sq mi)

Case study research, however, has led some researchers to believe that the statistical evidence belies the anti-democratic elements of microstate politics. Due to small populations, family and personal relations are often decisive in microstate politics. In some cases, this impedes neutral and formal decision-making and instead leads to undemocratic political activity, such as clientelism, corruption, particularism and executive dominance.

The high number of democracies amongst microstates could be explained by their colonial history. Most microstates adopted the same political system as their colonial ruler. Because of the high number of microstates that were British colonies in the past, microstates often have a majoritarian and parliamentary political system similar to the Westminster system. Some microstates with a history as British colony have implemented some aspects of a consensus political system, to adapt to their geographic features or societal make-up. While the colonial history often determines what political systems microstates have, they do implement changes to better accommodate their specific characteristics.

=== Microstates and international relations ===
Microstates often rely on other countries in order to survive, as they have a small military capacity and a lack of resources. This had led some to believe that microstates are forced to subordinate themselves to larger states which reduces their sovereignty. However, research has shown that microstates strategically engage in patron-client relationships with other countries. This allows them to trade some privileges to countries that can advance their interests the most. Examples of this are microstates that establish a tax haven or sell their support in international committees in exchange for military and economic support.

== Historical anomalies and aspirant states ==
A small number of tiny sovereign political units have been founded on historic anomalies or eccentric interpretations of law. Those types of states, often labelled as "microstates," are usually located on small (usually disputed) territorial enclaves, generate limited economic activity founded on tourism and philatelic and numismatic sales, and are tolerated or ignored by the nations from which they claim to have seceded.

The Republic of Indian Stream, now the town of Pittsburg, New Hampshire, was a geographic anomaly that had been left unresolved by the Treaty of Paris, which ended the American Revolutionary War, and was claimed by both the United States and Canada. Between 1832 and 1835, the area's residents refused to acknowledge either claimant.

The Cospaia Republic became independent by a treaty error and survived from 1440 to 1826. Its independence made it important in the introduction of tobacco cultivation to Italy.

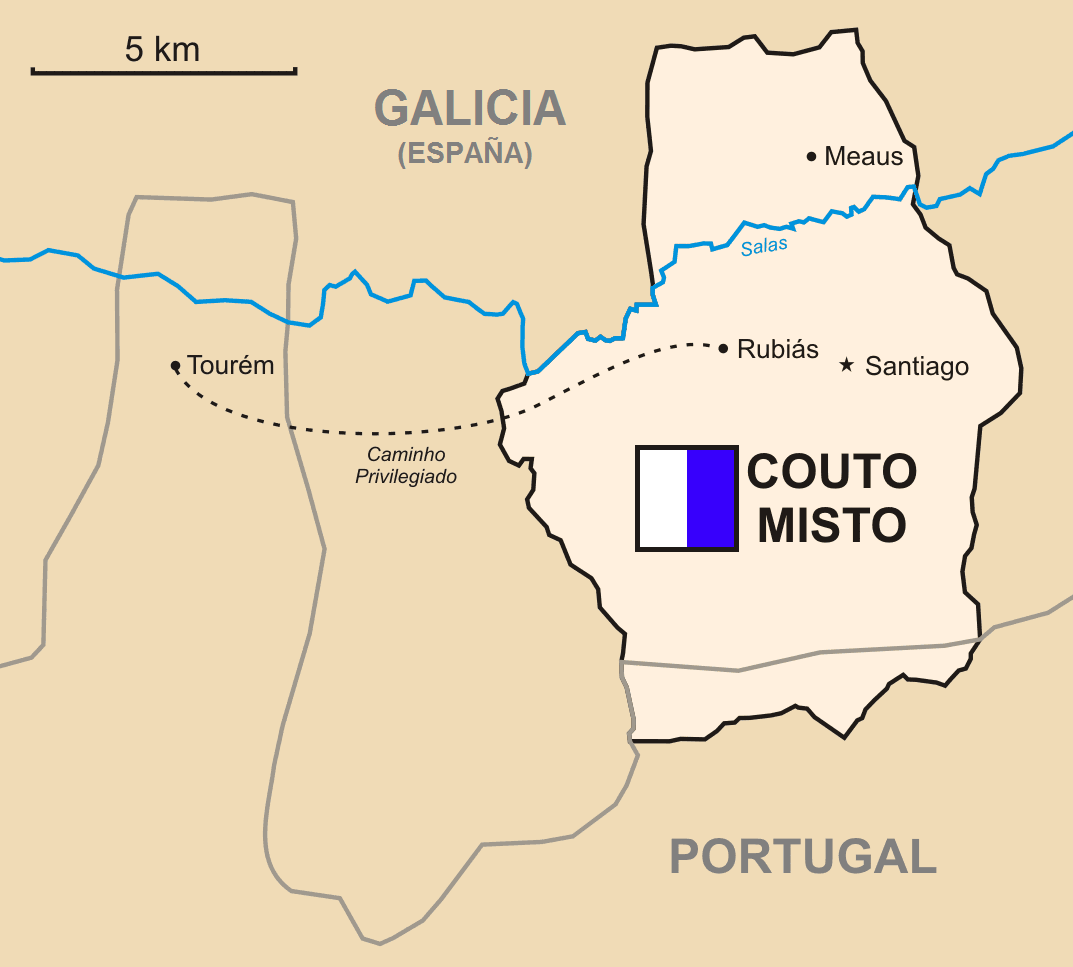
Couto Misto, a former independent microstate in Europe, located between Spain and Portugal

Couto Misto was disputed by Spain and Portugal and operated as a sovereign state until the 1864 Treaty of Lisbon partitioned the territory, with the larger part becoming part of Spain.

Jaxa was a small state that existed during the 17th century at the border between Tsardom of Russia and Qing China. Despite its location in East Asia, the state's primary language was Polish.

== Smallest by population ==
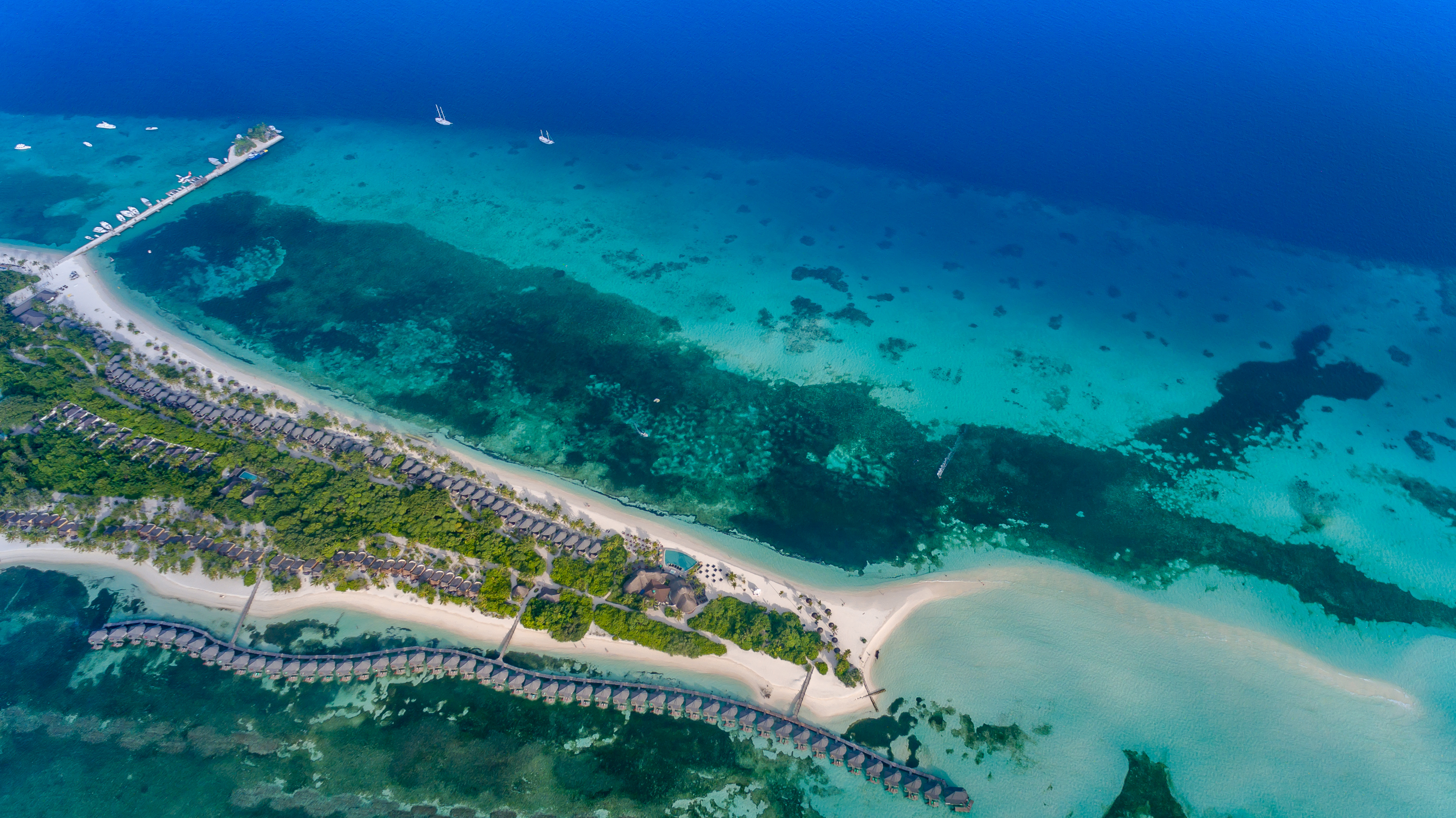
Maldives in the Indian Ocean, the smallest independent country in Asia with an area of 298 km^{2} (115 sq mi)

Listed here are the smallest sovereign states by population, with dependencies and associated states excluded. It includes countries up to about the size of Malta, which is one of the most populous countries that has been called a microstate. Microstate, as discussed in this article, is not a precisely defined term but involves limited land and/or population compared to other states.

List of countries and territories by total population
Location	Population	% of world	Date	Source (official or from the United Nations)	Notes
Vatican City	764	0%	26 Jun 2023	Official figure	Enclosed by Italy
Tuvalu	10,679	0.0001%	1 Jul 2021	National annual projection	Pacific
Nauru	11,680	0.0001%	30 Oct 2021	2021 Census	Pacific
Cook Islands	15,040	0.0002%	1 Jul 2021	2021 Census	Pacific
San Marino	33,950	0.0004%	May 2024	Monthly national estimate	Enclosed by Italy
Monaco	38,367	0.0005%	31 Dec 2023	Census	Mediterranean; semi-enclave within France
Liechtenstein	40,023	0.0005%	31 Dec 2023	National estimate	Enclosed by Switzerland and Austria
Saint Kitts and Nevis	51,320	0.0006%	2022	2022 census result	Caribbean
Dominica	67,408	0.0008%	31 Dec 2017	Official estimate	Caribbean
Andorra	86,398	0.001%	31 Jul 2024	Official estimate	Enclosed by Spain and France
Tonga	100,179	0.001%	1 Jan 2022	National annual estimate	
Antigua and Barbuda	103,603	0.001%	1 Jan 2024	National annual estimate	Caribbean
Saint Vincent and the Grenadines	110,872	0.001%	1 Jul 2022	Official estimate	Caribbean
Grenada	112,579	0.001%	1 Jul 2019	Official estimate	Caribbean
Seychelles	120,581	0.001%	31 Dec 2023	Official estimate	Indian Ocean
Kiribati	120,740	0.001%	1 Jul 2021	National annual projection	Pacific
Saint Lucia	184,100	0.002%	1 Jul 2023	Official estimate	Caribbean
Samoa	205,557	0.002%	6 Nov 2021	Census 2021	Pacific
São Tomé and Príncipe	228,319	0.003%	1 Jul 2024	National annual projection	Atlantic
Barbados	267,800	0.003%	31 Dec 2022		Caribbean
Vanuatu	321,409	0.004%	1 Jul 2024	National annual projection	
Iceland	383,726	0.005%	1 Jan 2024	National quarterly estimate	Atlantic
Bahamas	397,360	0.005%	1 Jul 2022		
Belize	410,919	0.005%	1 Jul 2024	Official estimate	
Brunei	445,400	0.005%	1 Jul 2022	Official estimate	
Cape Verde	491,233	0.006%	16 Jun 2021	2021 census result	
Maldives	515,132	0.006%	13 Sep 2022	2022 census result	
Malta	542,051	0.007%	31 Dec 2022	Official estimate	Mediterranean
Suriname	616,500	0.007%	1 Jul 2021	Official estimate	
Montenegro	616,695	0.007%	1 Jan 2023	National annual estimate	
Luxembourg	672,020	0.008%	1 Jan 2024	Official estimate	Enclosed by Belgium, France and Germany
Solomon Islands	750,325	0.009%	1 Jul 2024	National annual projection	
Comoros	758,316	0.009%	15 Dec 2017	2017 census result	

== See also ==
- City-state
- European microstates
- Free State of Fiume
- Free Territory of Trieste
- Island country
- List of countries and dependencies by population density
- List of countries and outlying territories by total area
- List of countries by population
- Microstates and the United Nations
- Neutral Moresnet
- Free City of Danzig
- Free City of Cracow
