= Treaty of Lisbon (1864) =

1864 treaty between Spain and Portugal

The Treaty of Lisbon is a treaty on the borders of Spain and Portugal from the mouth of the Minho River to the junction of the Caia River with the Guadiana River. Signed in Lisbon on 29 September 1864, it abolished the Couto Misto microstate.

The final act of approving annexes to the treaty was signed at Lisbon on 4 November 1866.
