= Santiago de Rubiás =

Village in Galicia, Spain

Coordinates: 41.908°N 7.818°W

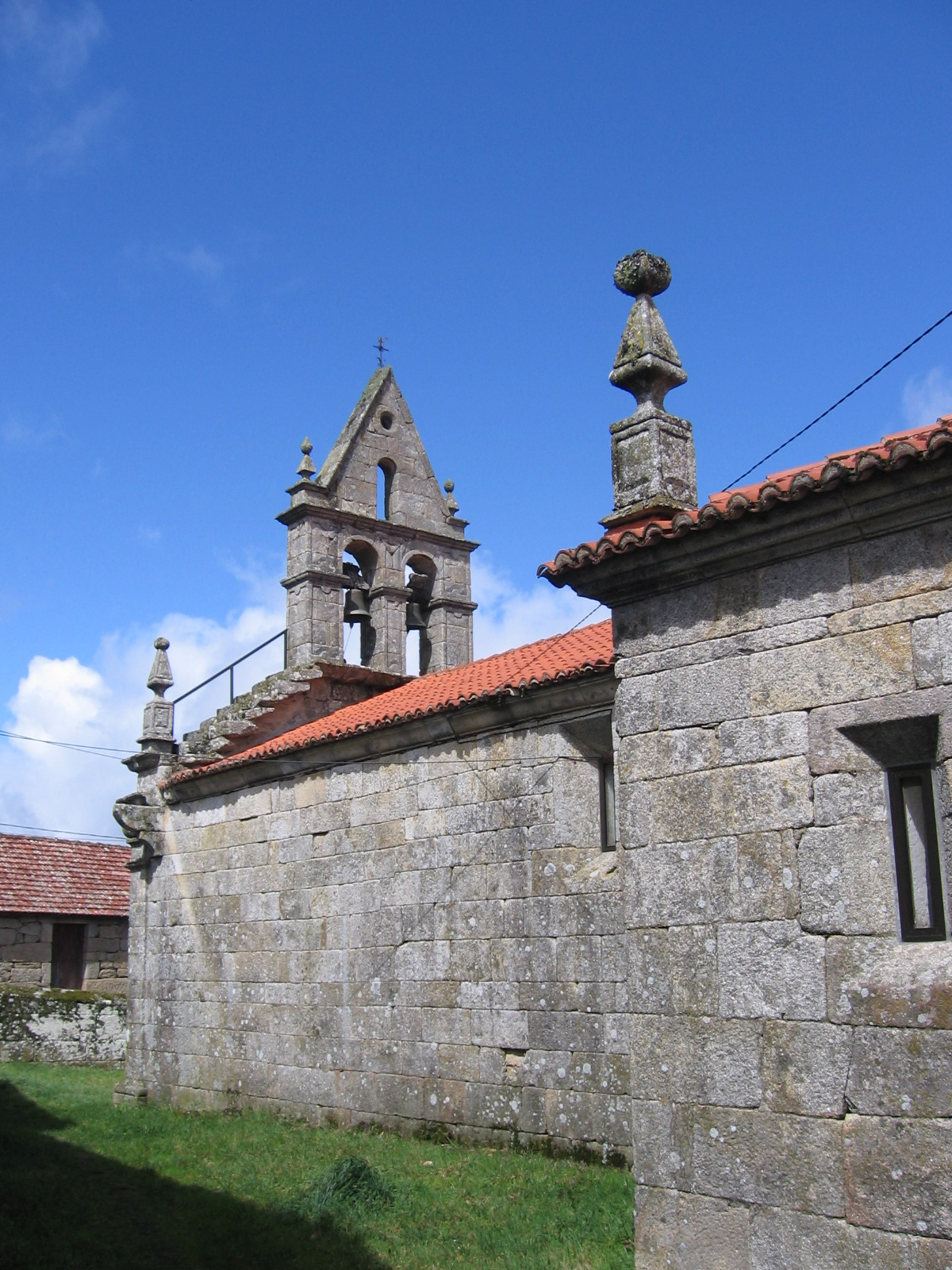
The Church of Santiago

Santiago de Rubiás is a village in Spain, located in the municipality of Calvos de Randín, Ourense, Galicia. The census for 2007 showed 65 inhabitants. Until 1868 it formed with Meaus and Rubiás a de facto independent state called Couto Misto, of which Santiago was the capital.

== See also ==
- Couto Misto
