= Baltar, Ourense =

Baltar
- Municipality
- Coat of arms

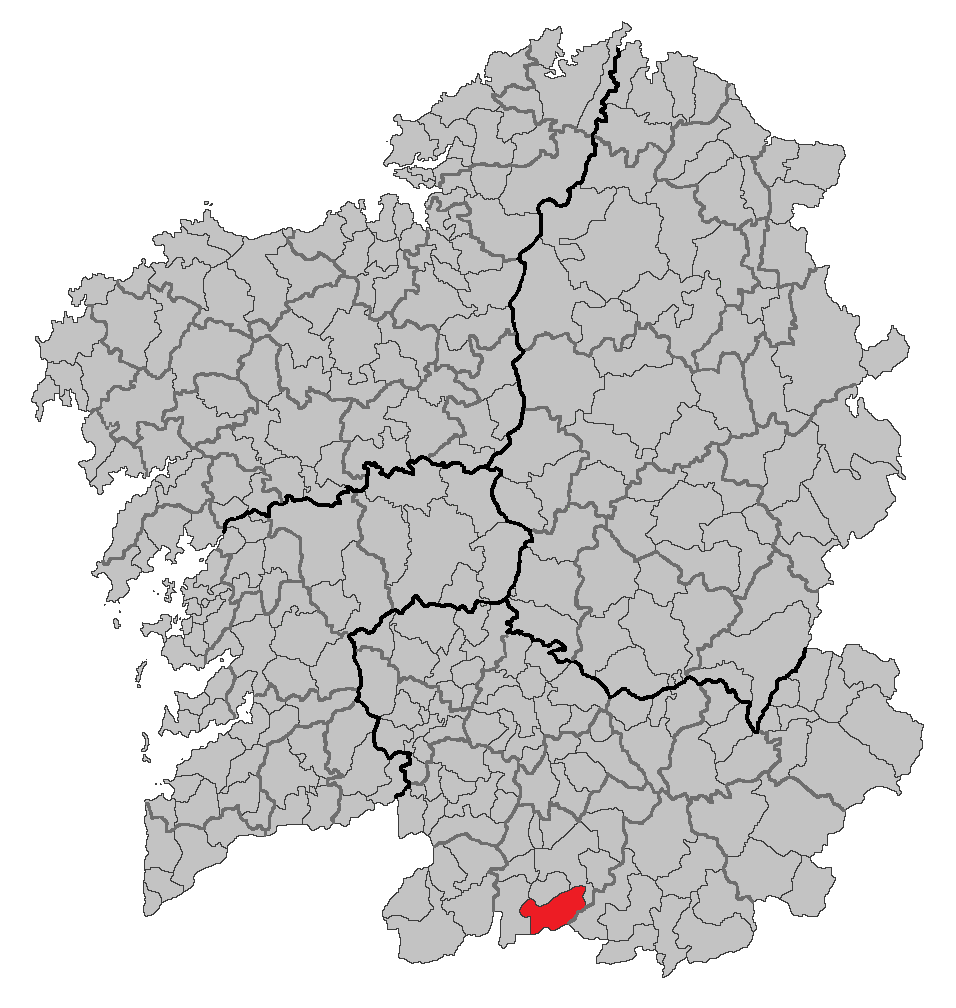
- Location in Galicia

- Location in Spain
- Country: Spain
- Autonomous community: Galicia
- Province: Ourense
- Comarca: A Limia

Government
  - Mayor: José Antonio Feijoo Alonso (PPdeG)

Area
  - Total: 94 km^{2} (36 sq mi)
- Elevation: 821 m (2,694 ft)

Population (2025-01-01)
  - Total: 849
  - Density: 9.0/km^{2} (23/sq mi)
- Time zone: UTC+1 (CET)
  - Summer (DST): UTC+2 (CEST)
- INE municipality code: 32005

Baltar is a municipality in the province of Ourense, in the autonomous community of Galicia, Spain. It belongs to the comarca of A Limia. The municipality has an area of area of 93.99 km. and its population was 986 in 2016 (1002 in 2015, 1149 in 2006, 1177 in 2005, 1180 in 2004, 1189 in 2003). It shares a border with Portugal to the south.
