= Tourém =

Place in the municipality of Montalegre, north of Portugal

- Civil parish
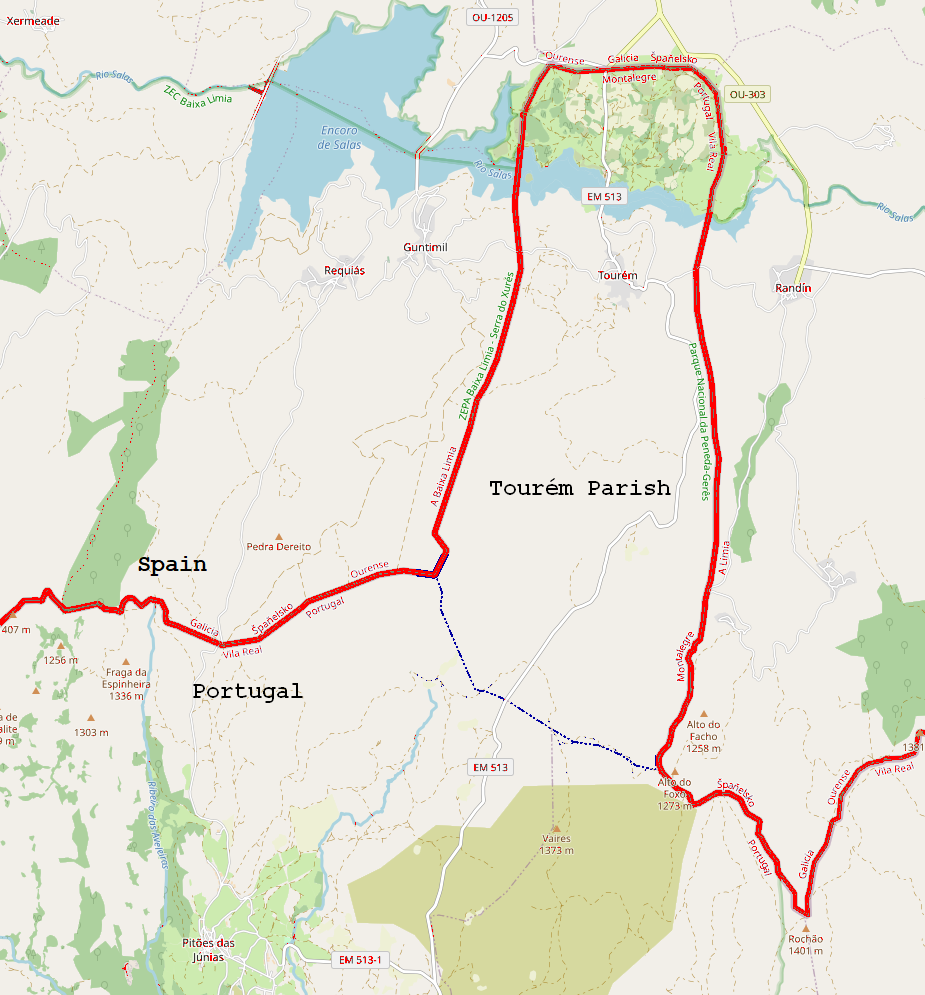
- Coordinates: 41.8929°N 7.9539°W
- Country: Portugal
- Region: Norte
- Intermunic. comm.: Alto Tâmega
- District: Vila Real
- Municipality: Montalegre

Area
  - Total: 16.61 km^{2} (6.41 sq mi)

Population (2021)
  - Total: 112
  - Density: 6.74/km^{2} (17.5/sq mi)
- Time zone: UTC+00:00 (WET)
  - Summer (DST): UTC+01:00 (WEST)
- Postal code: 5470
- Patron: Sao Pedro

Tourém is a village and parish (freguesia) in the municipality of Montalegre in the far north of Portugal. The main part of the territory of the parish stretches as a small peninsula of Portuguese land within Spanish territory. The northern extremity of the parish is separated from the rest of the Parish and, therefore, the rest of Portugal by a lake in the Salas River in Spanish territory, making it an exclave. The parish has an area of 16,61 km² and 112 inhabitants (2021).
