= Calvos de Randín =

- Municipality
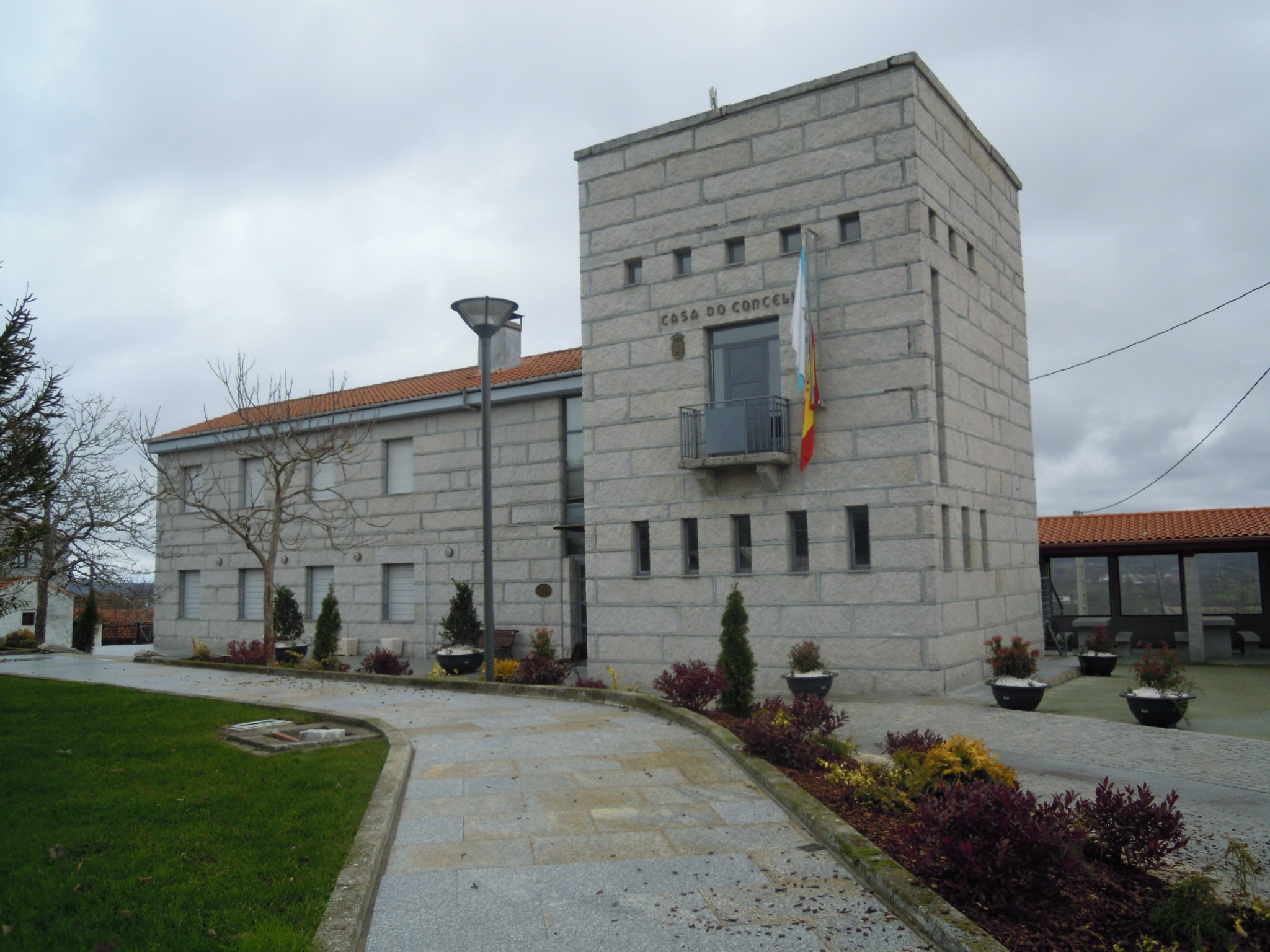

- Flag Coat of arms

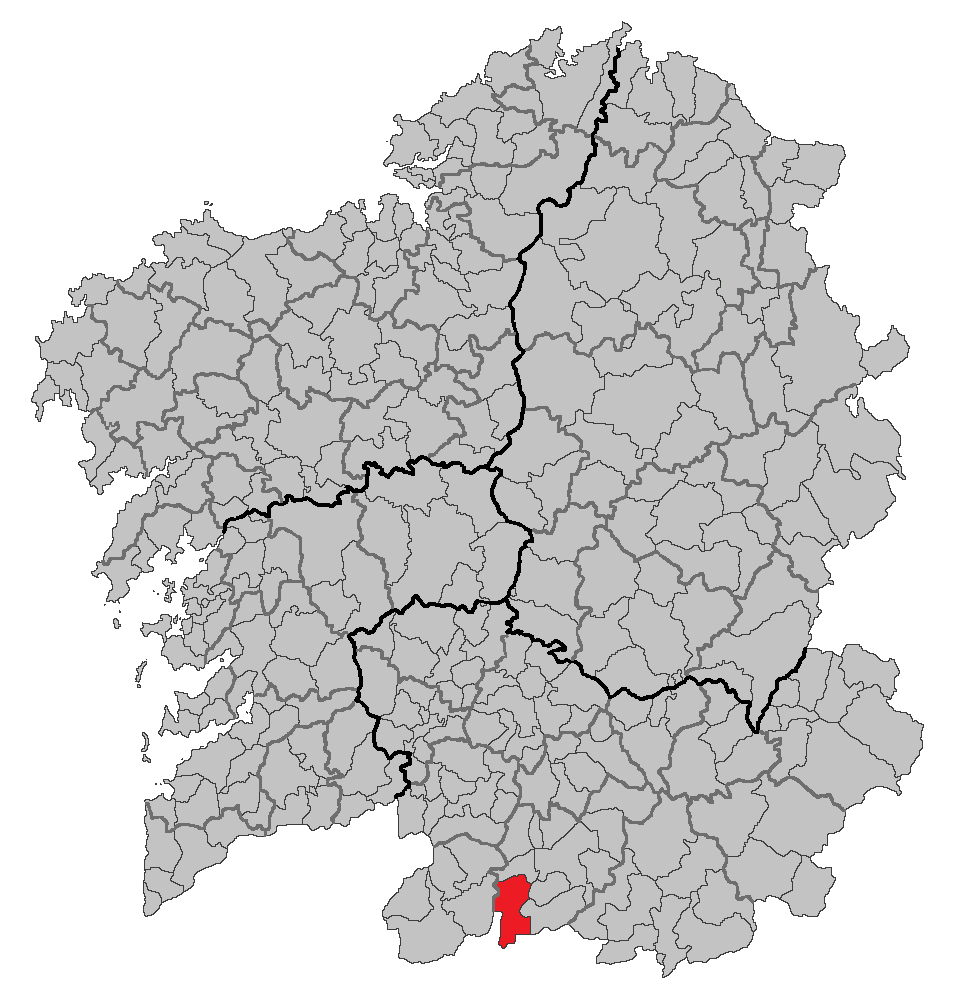
- Location in Galicia

- Location in Spain Calvos de Randín (Galicia) Calvos de Randín (Spain)
- Coordinates: 41°54′17″N 7°52′32″W
- Country: Spain
- Autonomous community: Galicia
- Province: Ourense
- Comarca: A Limia

Government
  - Mayor: Aquilino Valencia Salgado (PSdeG)

Area
  - Total: 97.7 km^{2} (37.7 sq mi)
- Elevation: 893 m (2,930 ft)

Population (2025-01-01)
  - Total: 650
  - Density: 6.7/km^{2} (17/sq mi)
- Time zone: UTC+1 (CET)
  - Summer (DST): UTC+2 (CEST)
- INE municipality code: 32016
- Website: www.calvosderandin.com/en

Calvos de Randín is a municipality in the province of Ourense, in the autonomous community of Galicia in northwestern Spain. It is located in one of the southernmost points of Galicia, bordering Portugal to the south.

It consists of the parishes of Calvos (Santiago); Castelaus (San Martiño), Feás (San Miguel), Golpellás (San Xoán), Lobás (San Vicente), Randín (San Xoán), Rioseco (Santa Mariña) Rubiás dos Mixtos and Vila (Santa María).
