= Montalegre Municipal Chamber =

Legislative body of Montalegre

Coordinates: 41.82319°N 7.79185°W

Montalegre Municipal Chamber Câmara Municipal de Montalegre
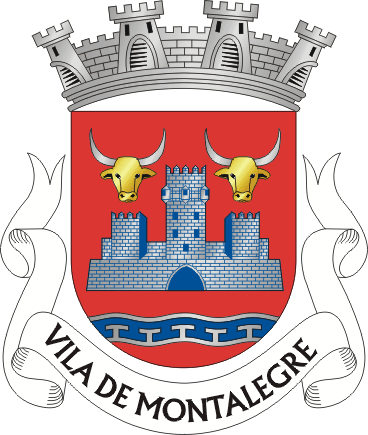
- Coat of arms of the town of Montalegre

Type
- Type: Câmara municipal
- Term limits: 3

History
- Founded: 9 June 1273; 752 years ago

Leadership
- President: Fátima Fernandes, PS since 20 October 2021
- Vice President: Ana Isabel Dias, PS since 20 October 2021

Structure
- Seats: 7
- Political groups: Municipal Executive (4) PS (4) Opposition (3) PSD (3)
- Length of term: Four years

Elections
- Last election: 26 September 2021
- Next election: Sometime between 22 September and 14 October 2025

Meeting place
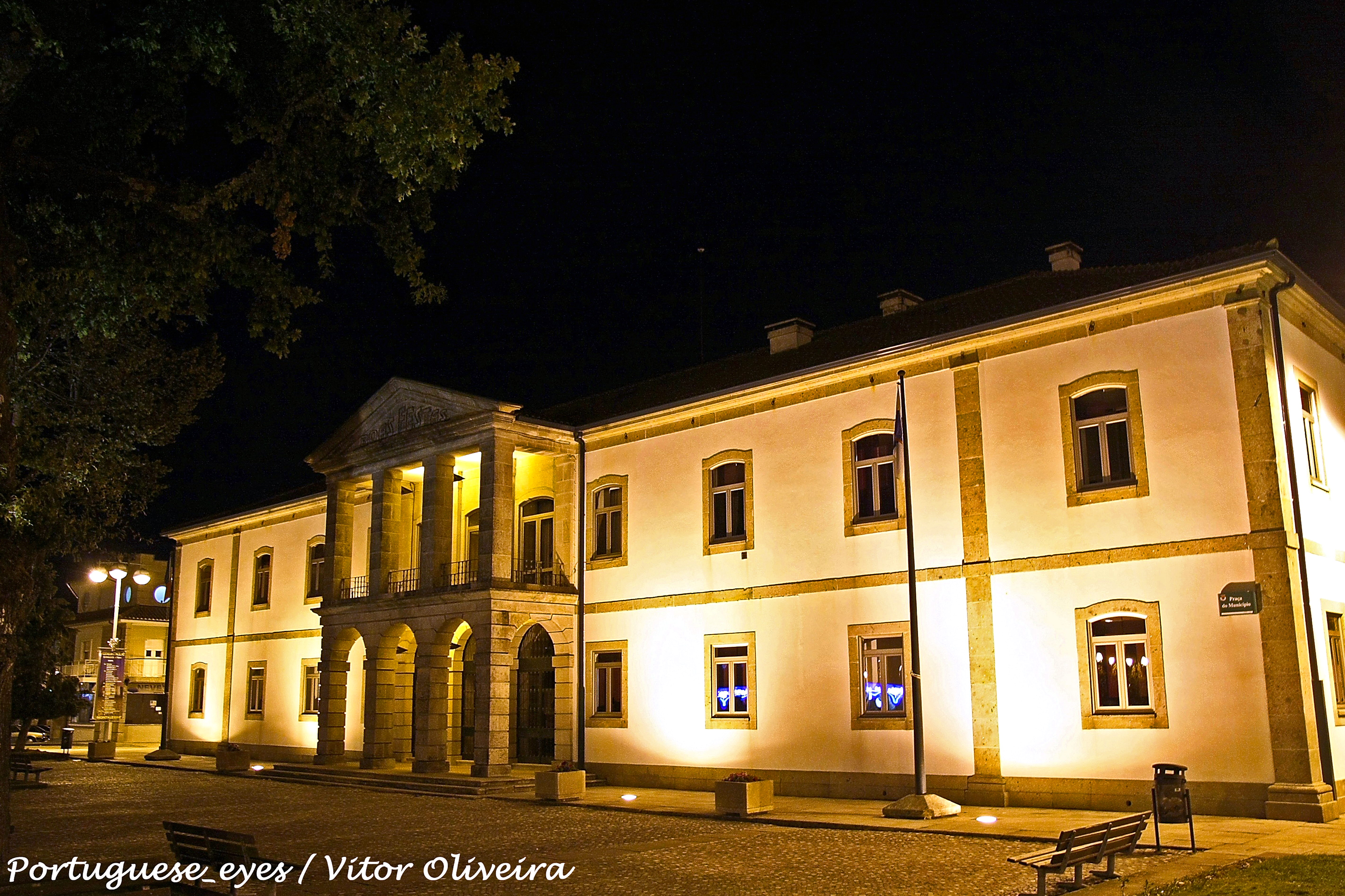
- Paços do Concelho de Montalegre

Website
- www.cm-montalegre.pt

The Montalegre Municipal Chamber (Portuguese: Câmara Municipal de Montalegre) is the administrative authority in the municipality of Montalegre. It has 25 freguesias in its area of jurisdiction and is based in the town of Montalegre, on the Vila Real District. These freguesias are: Cabril; Cambeses do Rio, Donões e Mourilhe; Cervos; Chã; Covelo do Gerês; Ferral; Gralhas; Meixedo e Padornelos; Montalegre e Padroso; Morgade; Negrões; Outeiro; Paradela, Contim e Fiães; Pitões das Júnias; Reigoso; Salto; Santo André; Sarraquinhos; Sezelhe e Covelães; Solveira; Tourém; Venda Nova e Pondras; Viade de Baixo e Fervidelas; Vila da Ponte and Vilar de Perdizes e Meixide.

The Montalegre City Council is made up of 7 councillors, representing, currently, two different political forces. The first candidate on the list with the most votes in a municipal election or, in the event of a vacancy, the next candidate on the list, takes office as President of the Municipal Chamber.

== List of the Presidents of the Municipal Chamber of Montalegre ==
- José Carvalho de Moura – (1976–1989)
- Joaquim Lopes Pires – (1989–1997)
- Fernando Gomes Rodrigues – (1997–2013)
- Manuel Orlando Alves – (2013–2022)
- Fátima Fernandes – (2022–2025)

(The list is incomplete)
