= Bobadela, Boticas =

Bobadela
- Civil parish
- Location in Portugal
- Coordinates: 41°45′10″N 7°37′11″W
- Country: Portugal
- Region: Norte
- Intermunic. comm.: Alto Tâmega
- District: Vila Real
- Municipality: Boticas
- Disbanded: 2013

Area
  - Total: 14.7 km^{2} (5.7 sq mi)
- Elevation: 595 m (1,952 ft)

Population (2001)
  - Total: 487
  - Density: 33/km^{2} (86/sq mi)
- Time zone: UTC+00:00 (WET)
  - Summer (DST): UTC+01:00 (WEST)
- Postal code: 5460-210
- Area code: 276
- Patron: São Miguel Arcanjo
- Website: http://bobadela.jfreguesia.com/

Bobadela is a former civil parish, located in the municipality of Boticas, Portugal. In 2013, the parish merged into the new parish Ardãos e Bobadela. It has a population of less than 487 inhabitants, occupying an area of 14.7 km^{2} in the northeast that extends into the Serra do Leiranco.

== History ==
Bobadela received its name because historically there existed a religious association with houses with vaulted construction (bobadela is a colloquial Portuguese for vaulted).

Its settlements date back to pre-historic periods, with remnants of a primitive castro located to the west settlement of Bobadela: the Castro de Cidadonha. Also referred to as the Castro of Bobadela, or Castro do Brejo, it was unearthed and examined after 1983. In the excavations at the castro, primitive implements (of rock, bronze and metal) were discovered in the middle of the 1980s. In Nogueira, a similar castro was discovered on a hilltop, that was later Romanized, from vestiges of Roman mile markers and pavement stone discovered around the site. The settlement of Nogueira was also probably a Lusitanian village, with ruins of walls, but little else visible. Some latter sub-surface holes were also discovered, that indicated mining and/or precious materials.

The first parochial institutions were established in the 13th century, and pertained to the Sé of Braga, and later a command of the Order of Christ. The rector of Bobadela was supported by an annual stipend of 150,000 réis. The parochial Church of Bobadela, which was totally restored at the beginning of the 18th century, was originally constructed as a single nave structure.

The Poço das Freitas, is a place of public and cultural interest, owing to its peculiarity and rare nature. It is the largest public work in the municipality, used for the extraction of gold from mines and alluvial plains. The rock and soil extracted from this region were washed by waters from a local dam (which itself no longer exists) supported by a small ravine from the Serra da Cortiça (the Ganidoiro).

The Chapel of São Lourenço, erected in 1742, is located in the higher altitudes of the settlement, and since this period has fallen on a bad state of conservation.

== Geography ==
The parish of Bobadela is situated in the northeast of municipality of Botica. It is surrounded by the parishes of Ardãos (to the north), Sapiãos (to the south and east), and Cervos (to the west, in the municipality of Montalegre). Its 14.7 km^{2} area includes the villages/localities of Bobadela and Nogueira, which are located seven kilometres from the municipal seat.

From Boticas, Bobadela is accessed along the EN 312 roadway until Sapiãos or EN 103 (in the direction of Chaves), until the EM 527. The localities of Bobadela and Nogueira are merely one kilometre, along the southern flank of the Serra do Leiranco. Most of the agricultural lands extend along the southern border of the Serra do Leiranco, along the Terva valley: an area that is flat and fertile. Nogueira, located on the edge of the Serra do Leiranco, is located north of Bobadela village, near the Ribeiro das Lameiras.

== Culture ==
During Easter, it is a tradition for the local community to bring a typical sweetbread (Portuguese: folar) to the festivities. When this is not possible, it is a tradition that the local residents will support the others with the traditional confectionery.
