= Barrosã =

Portuguese breed of cattle

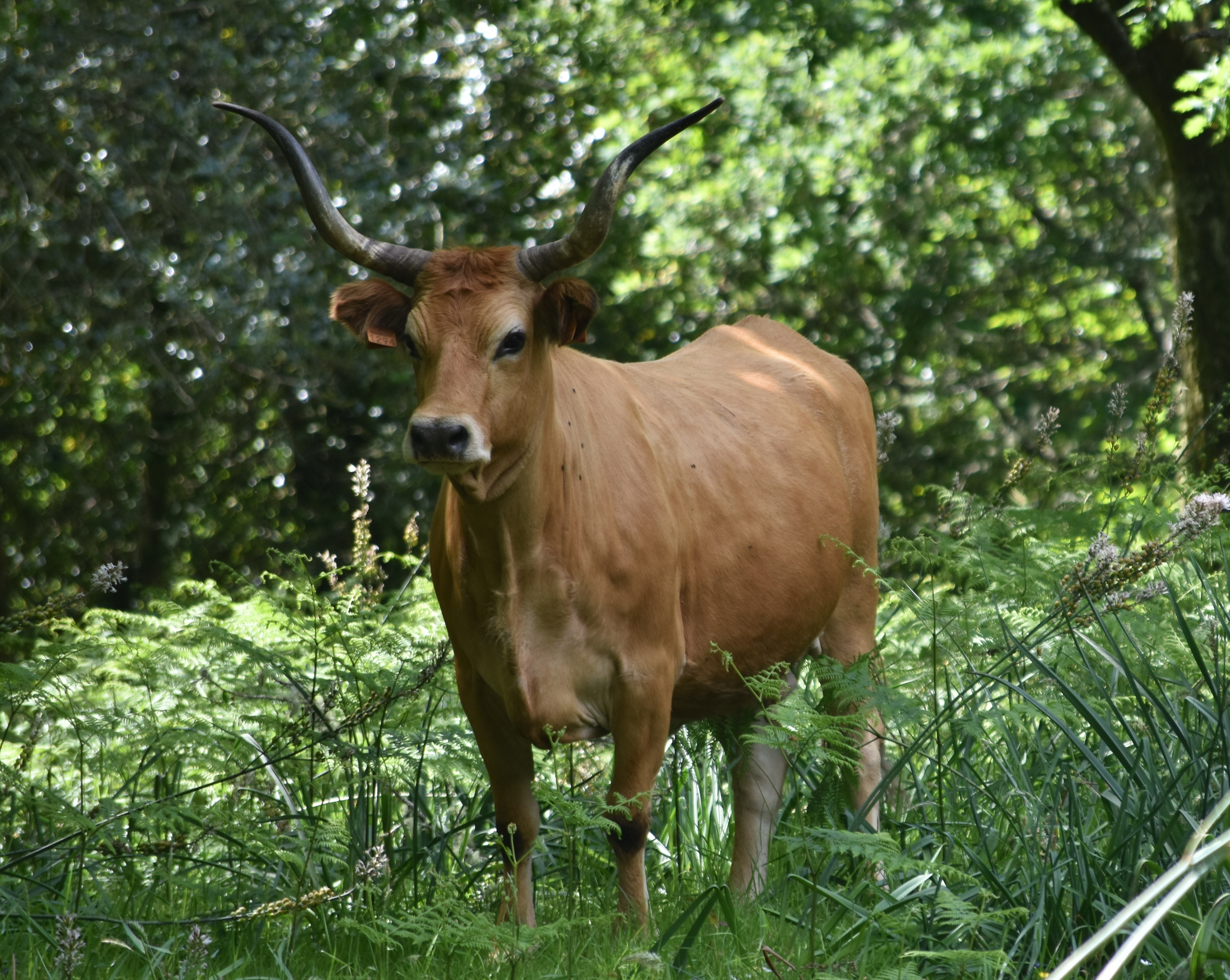
- A cow

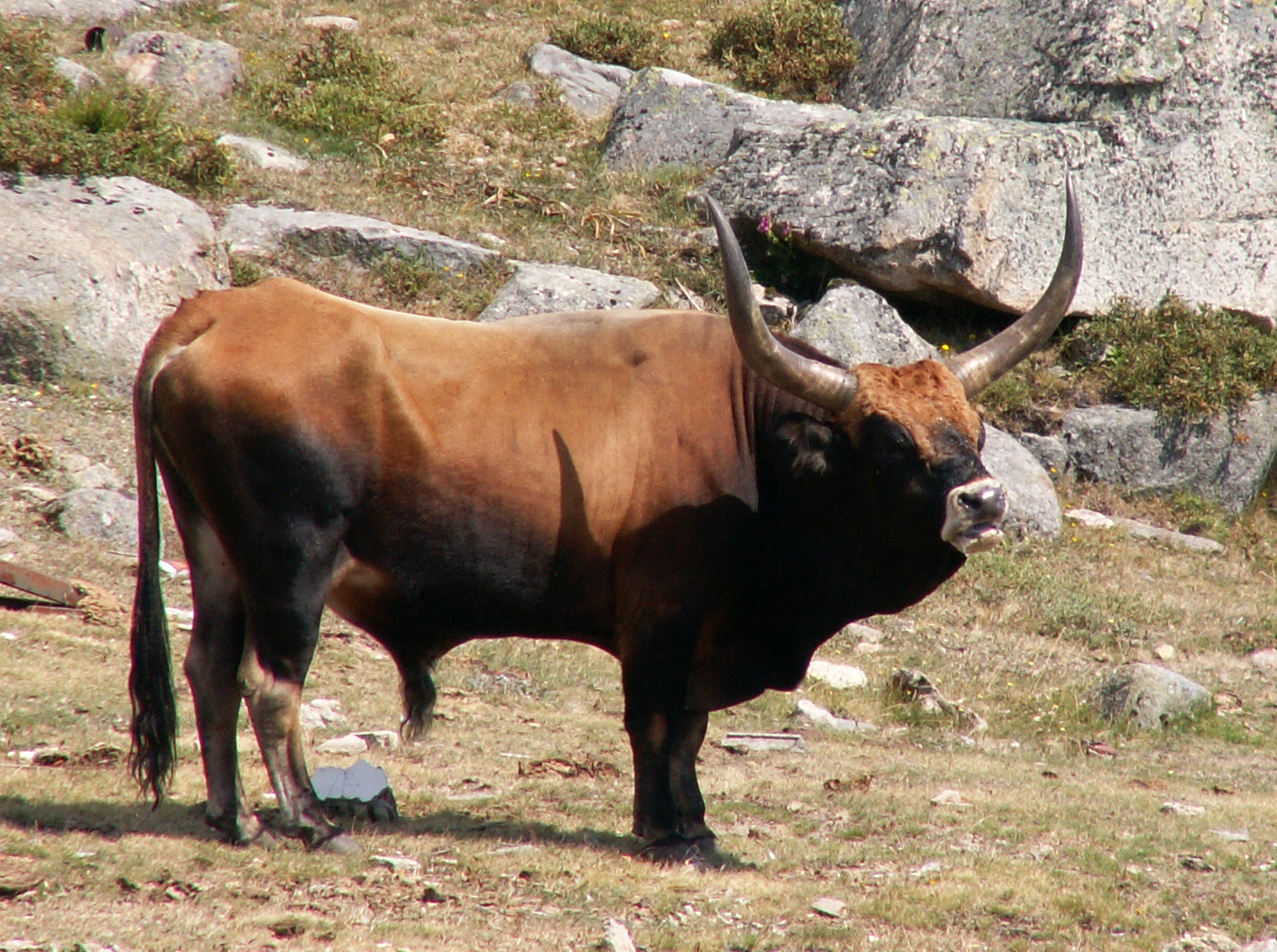
- A bull
- Conservation status: FAO (2007): not at risk; DAD-IS (2025): not at risk
- Other names: Maiana
- Country of origin: Portugal
- Distribution: Braga; Porto; Viana do Castelo; Vila Real
- Standard: Direção-Geral de Alimentação e Veterinária (page 20, in Portuguese)
- Use: dual-purpose, meat and draught work

Traits
- Weight: Male: 800 kg; Female: 450 kg
- Height: Male: 125 cm; Female: 115 cm

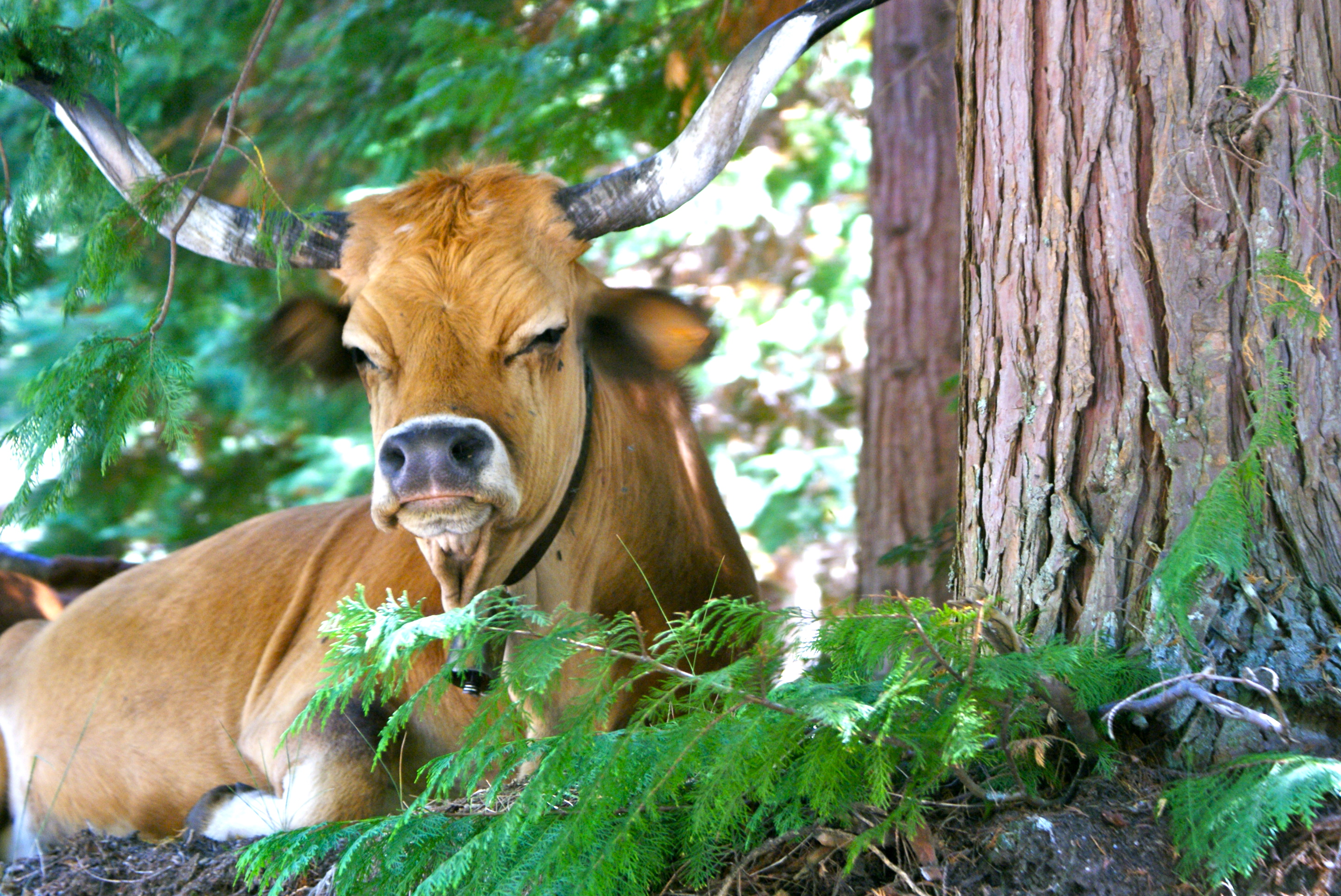
A cow in Peneda-Gerês National Park

The Barrosã is a traditional Portuguese breed of dual-purpose cattle, reared both for beef and for draught work. Its name derives from that of the Terras de Barroso, a plateau and cultural and historical region in the concelhos of Montalegre and Boticas in the District of Vila Real in northern Portugal.

Meat from the animals – if produced within a defined geographical area and under strict conditions – has Denominação de Origem Protegida status and may be marketed as Carne Barrosã DOP.

== History ==
In 1940 a census conducted by the Direcção Geral dos Serviços Pecuários found a total 224062 head of the cattle in the districts of Braga, Porto, Viana do Castelo and Vila Real.

In 2019, the herd-book recorded 355 purebred adult males and 6775 purebred females, managed by 1,926 Barrosã breed breeders.

== Characteristics ==
The average birth weight is 26.58 kg.

Cows reach puberty between 15 and 18 months, with the first calving occurring between 24 and 36 months. The average calving interval is around 420 days. From 18 months of age, bulls can be used for breeding, and semen collection for artificial insemination can begin at around 16 months.

== Use ==
Meat from the animals – if produced under strict conditions – has Denominação de Origem Protegida status and may be marketed as Carne Barrosã DOP. To be eligible, the cattle must have been registered in the herd-book and must have been born, reared and slaughtered within a defined area consisting of the concelhos of Amares, Braga, Cabeceiras de Basto, Celorico de Basto, Fafe, Guimarães, Póvoa de Lanhoso, Terras de Bouro, Vieira do Minho, Vila Verde and Vizela in the District of Braga; of Felgueiras and Paços de Ferreira in the District of Porto; of Arcos de Valdevez, Melgaço, Monção, Ponte da Barca, Ponte de Lima, Paredes de Coura and Valença in the District of Viana do Castelo; and of Boticas and Montalegre in the District of Vila Real.

The meat is marketed under four types, depending on the age of the animal: vitela, from veal calves slaughtered at between 5 and 9 months of age, with minimum carcass weight of 70 kg; vitelão, from calves of either sex, aged from 9 to 12 months; novilho, from young cattle of either sex, aged from 12 to 36 months; and vaca, from animals over 3 years old; the minimum weight for all older cattle is the same, 130 kg.
