= Ardãos e Bobadela =

- Civil parish
- Location in Portugal
- Coordinates: 41.75°N 7.61°W
- Country: Portugal
- Region: Norte
- Intermunic. comm.: Alto Tâmega
- District: Vila Real
- Municipality: Boticas

Area
  - Total: 37.12 km^{2} (14.33 sq mi)

Population (2011)
  - Total: 579
  - Density: 15.6/km^{2} (40.4/sq mi)
- Time zone: UTC+00:00 (WET)
  - Summer (DST): UTC+01:00 (WEST)

Ardãos e Bobadela is a civil parish in the municipality of Boticas, Portugal. It was formed in 2013 by the merger of the former parishes Ardãos and Bobadela. The population in 2011 was 579, in an area of 37.12 km^{2}.
