= Covas do Barroso =

Portuguese village and civil parish

- Civil parish
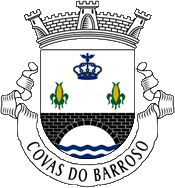
- Coat of arms

- Location in Portugal
- Coordinates: 41.636°N 7.783°W
- Country: Portugal
- Region: Norte
- Intermunic. comm.: Alto Tâmega
- District: Vila Real
- Municipality: Boticas

Area
  - Total: 29.58 km^{2} (11.42 sq mi)

Population (2011)
  - Total: 262
  - Density: 8.86/km^{2} (22.9/sq mi)
- Time zone: UTC+00:00 (WET)
  - Summer (DST): UTC+01:00 (WEST)
- Postal code: 5460
- Area code: 276
- Patron: Santa Maria
- Website: cbarroso.jfreguesia.com

Covas do Barroso is a civil parish (Portuguese: freguesia) in northern Portugal, in the municipality of Boticas, in the Vila Real District. The population in 2011 was 262, in an area of 29.58 km^{2}. Located in the subregion of Alto Trás-os-Montes, it comprises three villages: Covas do Barroso, Romaínho and Muro.

The community attracted international media attention in 2019 due to the local population's opposition to the planned mining of lithium found in the region, a metal that is highly important for the production of rechargeable batteries. Europe's largest lithium deposits are believed to be located here, which the multinational lithium mining consortium Savannah Resources, based in London, wants to mine. On the other hand, the area around Covas do Barroso was declared a World Heritage Site for Agriculture by the FAO in 2018 - due to the diverse pasture farming practised here for centuries, which promotes biodiversity. Since the start of the COVID-19 pandemic in Portugal, the economic situation has become more difficult due to fewer tourists and lithium mining has become more attractive due to the increased global market price.

== History ==
During the Middle Ages, Covas do Barroso consisted of five settlements: Couto de Dornelas, São Salvador de Viveiro, Canedo, Cabanelas and São Martinho). But, owing to deaths caused by the plague, the latter two settlements (Cabanelas and São Martinho) were extinguished.

The place's toponymy originated from its geographic location: the place is surrounded by mountain hilltops, and once seen from Alto do Castro, appears as ditch (Portuguese: cova).

The settlement of this territory corresponds with the ancient castros discovered in this area. In many of these castros discoveries of archaeological artefacts have been common, including Byzantine coins, from the era of Emperor Ducas.

Apart from archaeological proofs, the documented references refer to the existence of Covas do Barroso after the 12th century. Covas do Barroso was part of the municipality of Montalegre, until 6 November 1836, when the neighbouring municipality of Boticas was established. During this creation, Covas do Barroso passed into the administration of the latter, while judicially it was integrated into the Comarca of Chaves (in 1839), Montalegre (in 1878), and finally integrated into the Julgado de Eiró (in 1878). The attempted transfer of Covas do Barroso to municipality of Ribeira de Pena created conflict among its citizenry.

It was not until 1839 that its inhabitants received their first primary school (supported by a school headmaster who received a stipend of 20,000 réis annually).

Similarly, full electric light and electricity arrived only in 1966, owing to the installation of a generator in Aguieira.

== Geography ==
Covas do Barroso situated in the river-valleys of the Serra de Dornela, 17 kilometres from the municipal seat of Boticas, it consists of the localities of Covas do Barroso, Romainho and Muro. It is bordered by the parishes of Couto de Dornelas, São Salvador de Viveiro and Canedo.
