= Barroso (region) =

Coordinates: 41°41′N 8°00′W

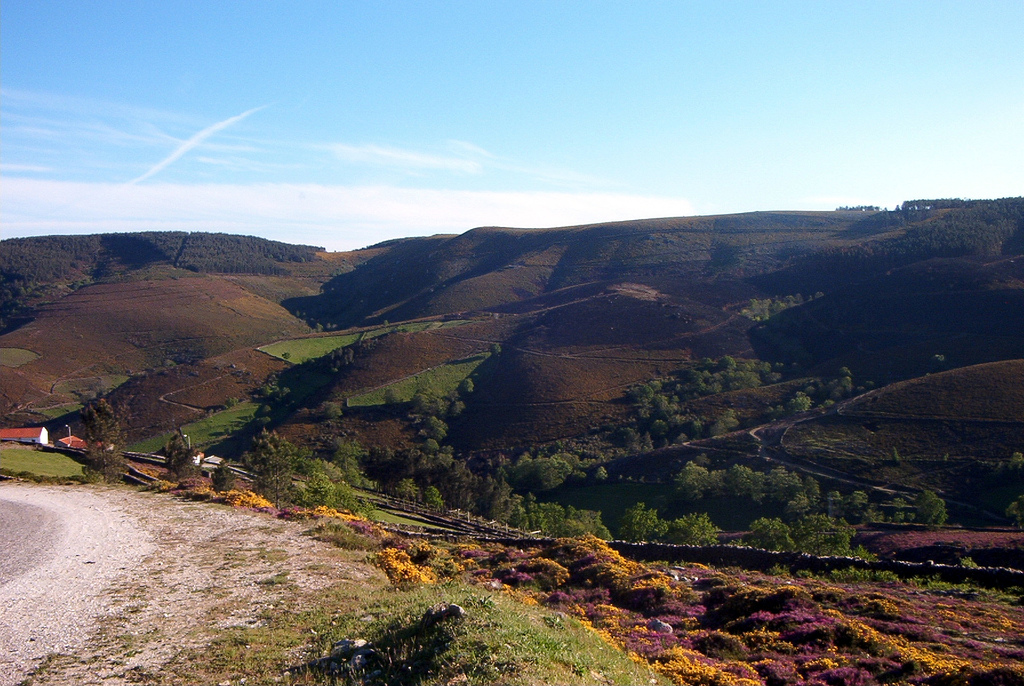
Estrada Boticas - Salto.

Barroso or Terras de Barroso (Lands of Barroso) is the traditional name of the region formed by the Portuguese municipalities of Montalegre and Boticas.

The Terras de Barroso existed as an administrative division of Portugal from 1273 to 1876, and the term "Barroso" and "Barrosã/Barrosão" (adjective) continue to be widely used to refer to the distinctive and isolated heritage, culture and landscape of this area. The region was one of the first in Europe, in 2018, to be recognised by the United Nations Food and Agriculture Organisation as a 'Globally Important Agricultural Heritage System.' The stocky Barrosã cattle with long curved horns are farmed across the North of Portugal and have been extensively studied because of their ancient genetic heritage.

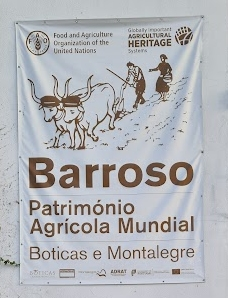
Banner outside Boticas council offices, celebrating the Barroso region's "World Agricultural Patrimony" Status October 2022

== History ==
The area is notable for the discovery of Gallaecian warrior statues - powerful, slightly larger than life size, stone images of iron age warrior heroes, dating to the immediate pre-Roman era.

"Terras de Barroso" refers to one of the ancient "terras", administrative and judicial structures, in which Portugal was divided from the 11th century. The term is first found in the will of Saint Rosende from 942 includes among his possessions a herd of cows "in Barosa." The first incontrovertible use of the term "Barroso" is in a Galician document from 1100 which indicates that the term Barroso refers to the "villa" of Tourém. Possibly, the original administrative centre of this region was the castle of São Romão, which occupies a now uninhabited site on the southern bank of the Alto-Rabagão dam.
