= Pitões das Júnias =

- Civil parish
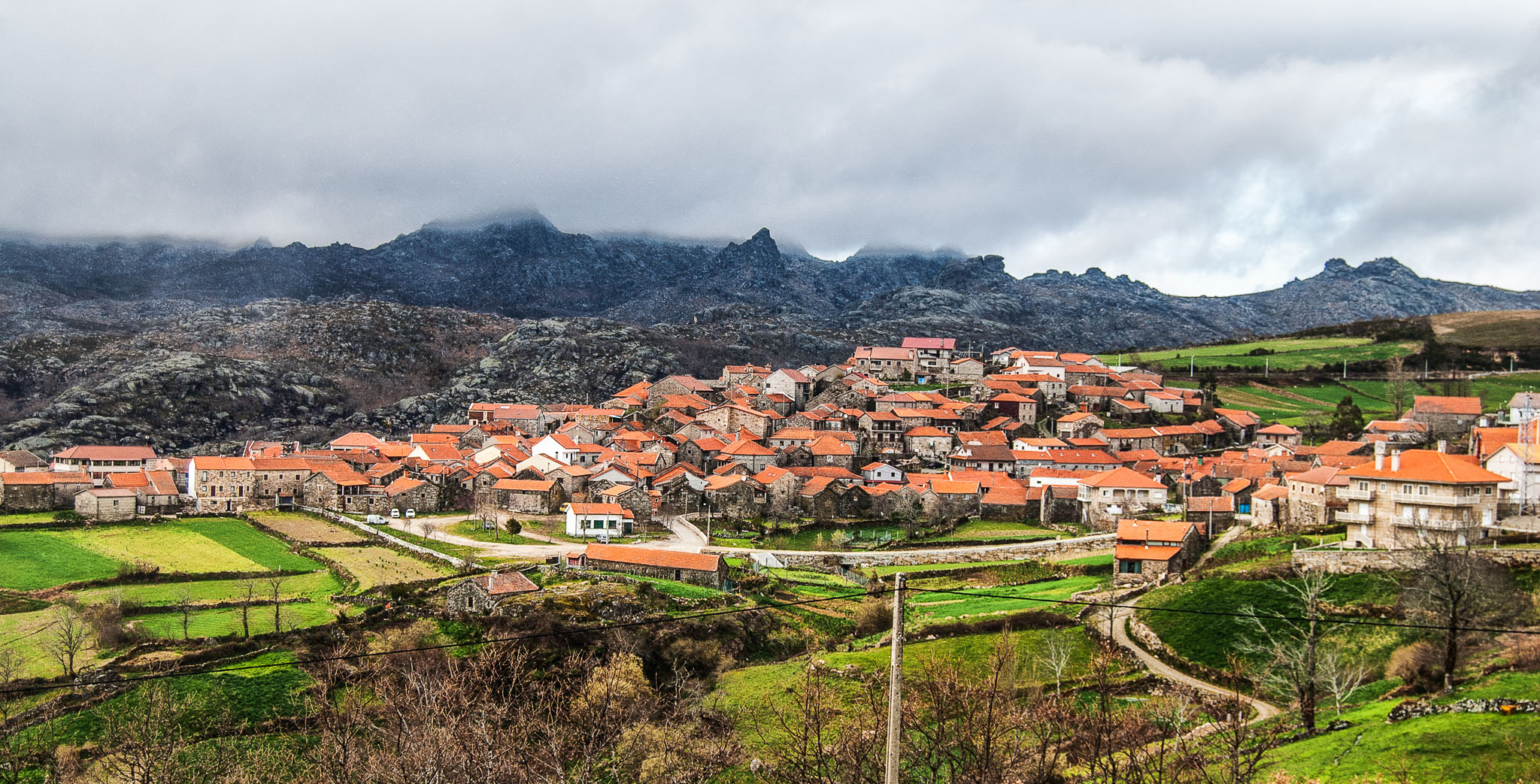
- Pitoes das Junias

- Location in Portugal
- Coordinates: 41.841°N 7.950°W
- Country: Portugal
- Region: Norte
- Intermunic. comm.: Alto Tâmega
- District: Vila Real
- Municipality: Montalegre

Area
  - Total: 36.89 km^{2} (14.24 sq mi)
- Elevation: 1,200 m (3,900 ft)

Population (2011)
  - Total: 161
  - Density: 4.36/km^{2} (11.3/sq mi)
- Time zone: UTC+00:00 (WET)
  - Summer (DST): UTC+01:00 (WEST)
- Postal code: 5470
- Patron: Nossa Senhora das Júnias
- Website: http://pitoesdasjunias.com/

Pitões das Júnias is a Portuguese freguesia ("civil parish"), located in the municipality of Montalegre in the district of Vila Real. The population in 2011 was 161, in an area of 36.89 km^{2}.

At around 1200 meters of elevation, it is one of the highest parishes in Portugal, being in the heart of the Peneda-Gerês National Park

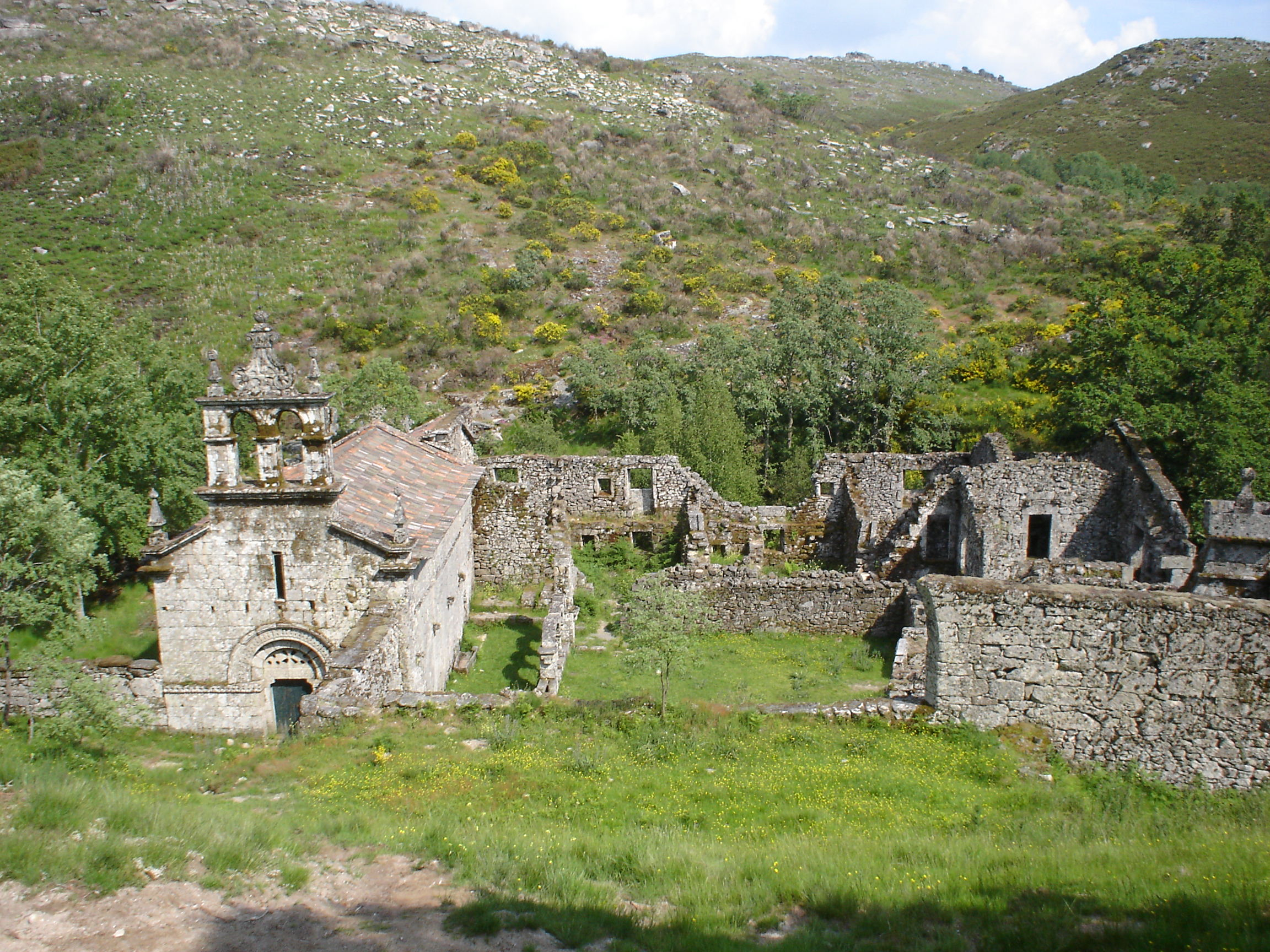
Monastery of Santa Maria das Júnias

== Description ==
The parish is located within the Peneda-Gerês National Park. Its history is interconnected with the Monastery of Santa Maria das Júnias, a Portuguese national monument composed of a monastery and its annexed temple, which were built during the first half of the 12th century.

Pitões das Júnias has become one of the most visited villages of Montalegre, mostly due to its fauna and flora, landscapes, walking trails, smoked meats and well-preserved traditions.
