= Cambeses do Rio, Donões e Mourilhe =

- Civil parish
- Location in Portugal
- Coordinates: 41.821°N 7.834°W
- Country: Portugal
- Region: Norte
- Intermunic. comm.: Alto Tâmega
- District: Vila Real
- Municipality: Montalegre

Area
  - Total: 45.30 km^{2} (17.49 sq mi)

Population (2011)
  - Total: 309
  - Density: 6.8/km^{2} (18/sq mi)
- Time zone: UTC+00:00 (WET)
  - Summer (DST): UTC+01:00 (WEST)

Cambeses do Rio, Donões e Mourilhe is a civil parish in the municipality of Montalegre, northern Portugal. It was formed in 2013 by the merger of the former parishes Cambeses do Rio, Donões and Mourilhe. The population in 2011 was 309, in an area of 45.30 km².
