= Gralhas =

- Civil parish
- Location in Portugal
- Coordinates: 41.849°N 7.705°W
- Country: Portugal
- Region: Norte
- Intermunic. comm.: Alto Tâmega
- District: Vila Real
- Municipality: Montalegre

Area
  - Total: 21.59 km^{2} (8.34 sq mi)

Population (2011)
  - Total: 208
  - Density: 9.6/km^{2} (25/sq mi)
- Time zone: UTC+00:00 (WET)
  - Summer (DST): UTC+01:00 (WEST)

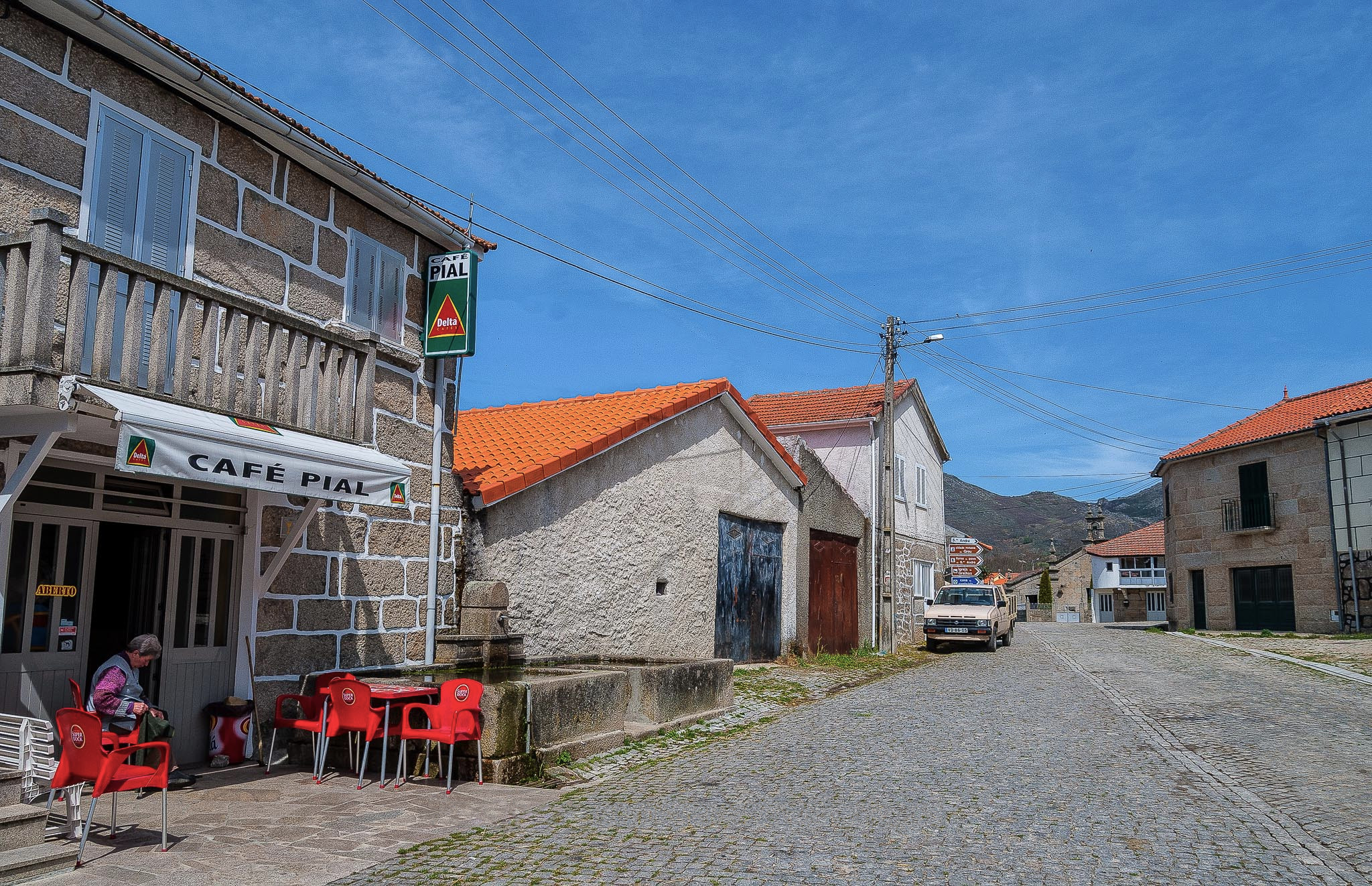
Gralhas

Gralhas is a parish and village in Montalegre Municipality, northern Portugal. The population in 2011 was 208, in an area of 21.59 km^{2}.

It is located at the base of Serra do Larouco ("Mountain Range of the Larouco").
