= Montalegre Castle =

Portuguese castle

Coordinates: 41.826°N 7.791°W

Castelo de Montalegre
- Montalegre, Portugal
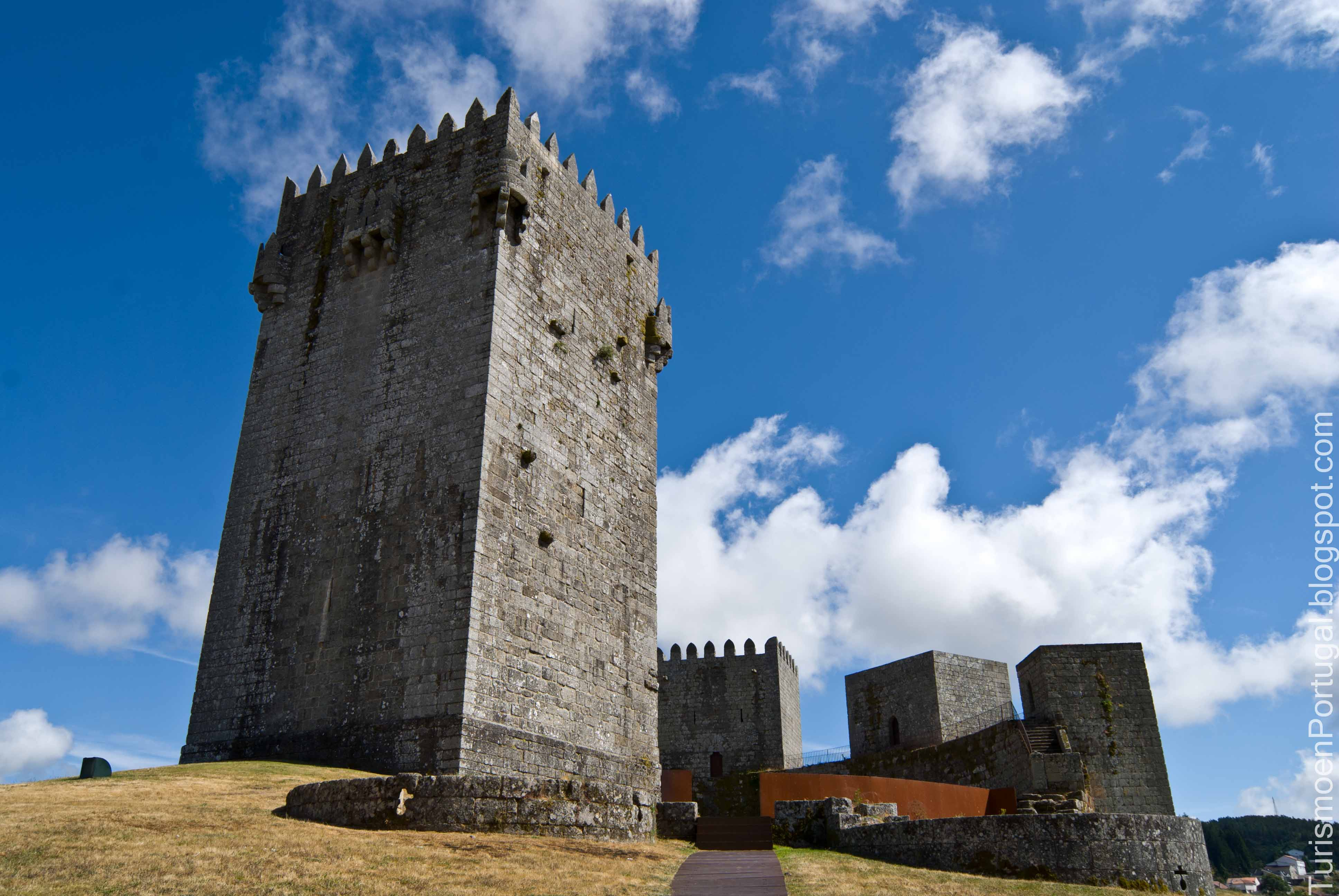

Site information
- Type: Medieval fortress
- Owner: Portuguese Republic
- Condition: Intact

Site history
- Built: 1279-1325
- Built by: Dinis of Portugal
- Events: Portuguese Restoration War

The Montalegre Castle is a Portuguese medieval castle and National monument in Montalegre, Vila Real.

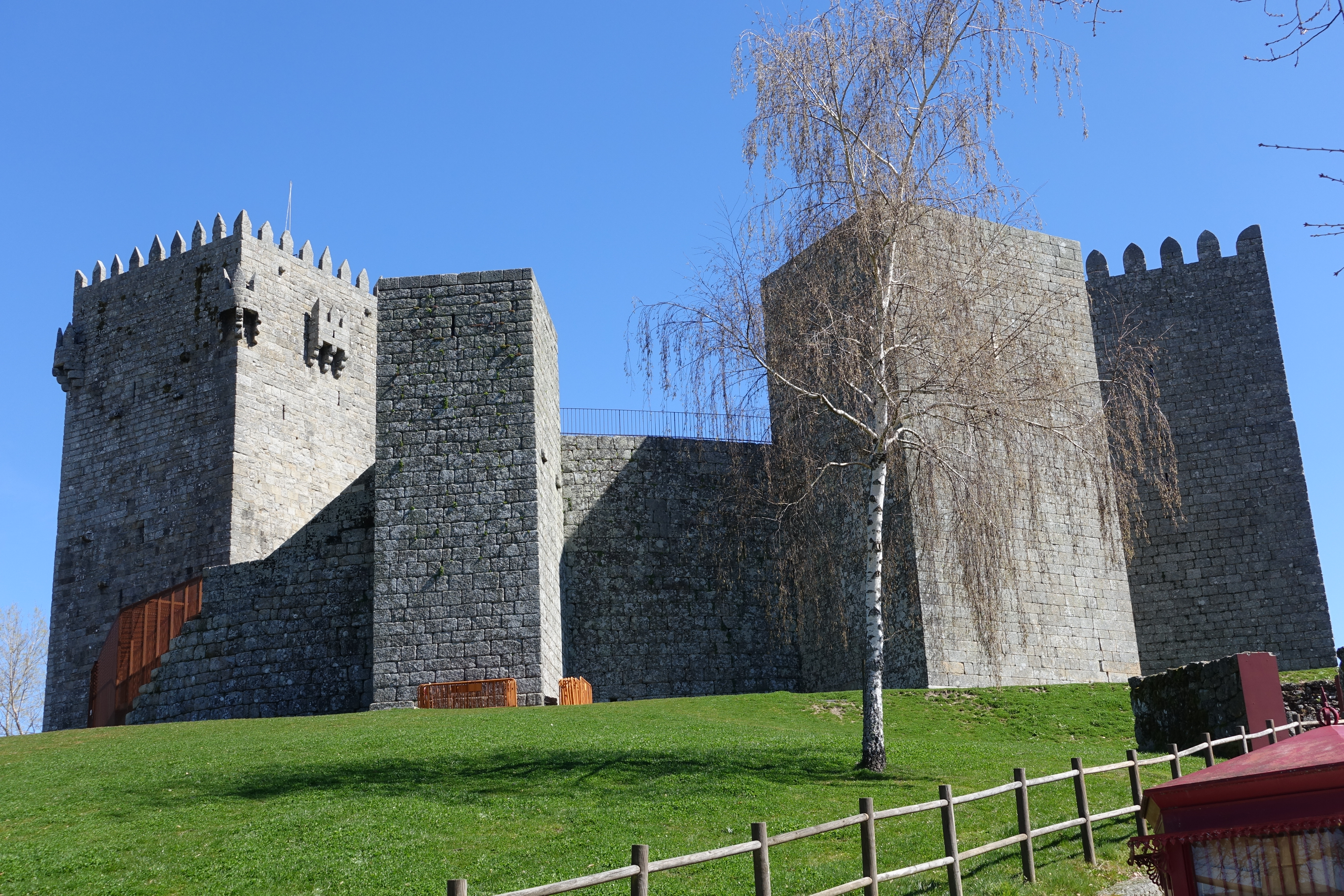

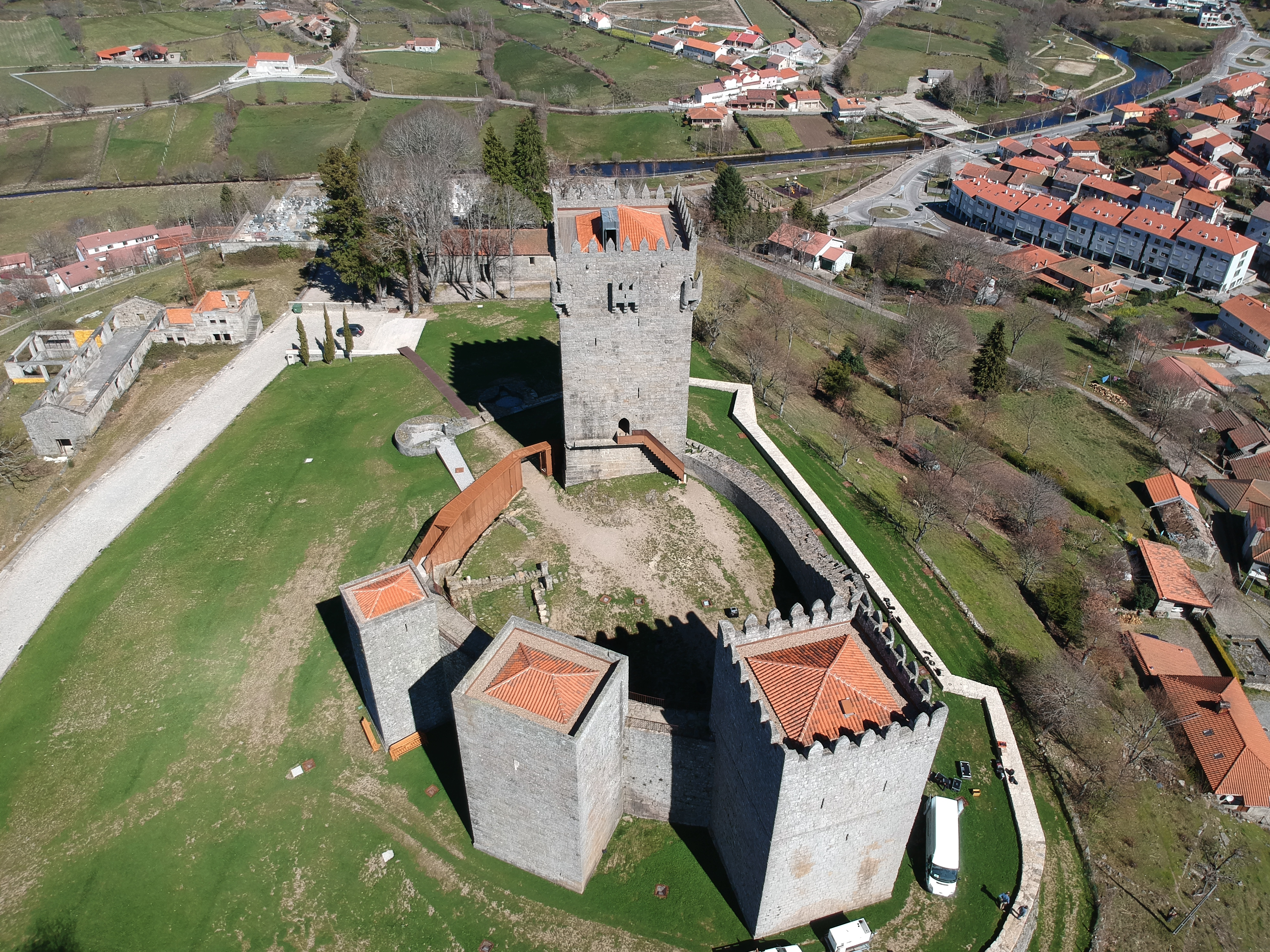

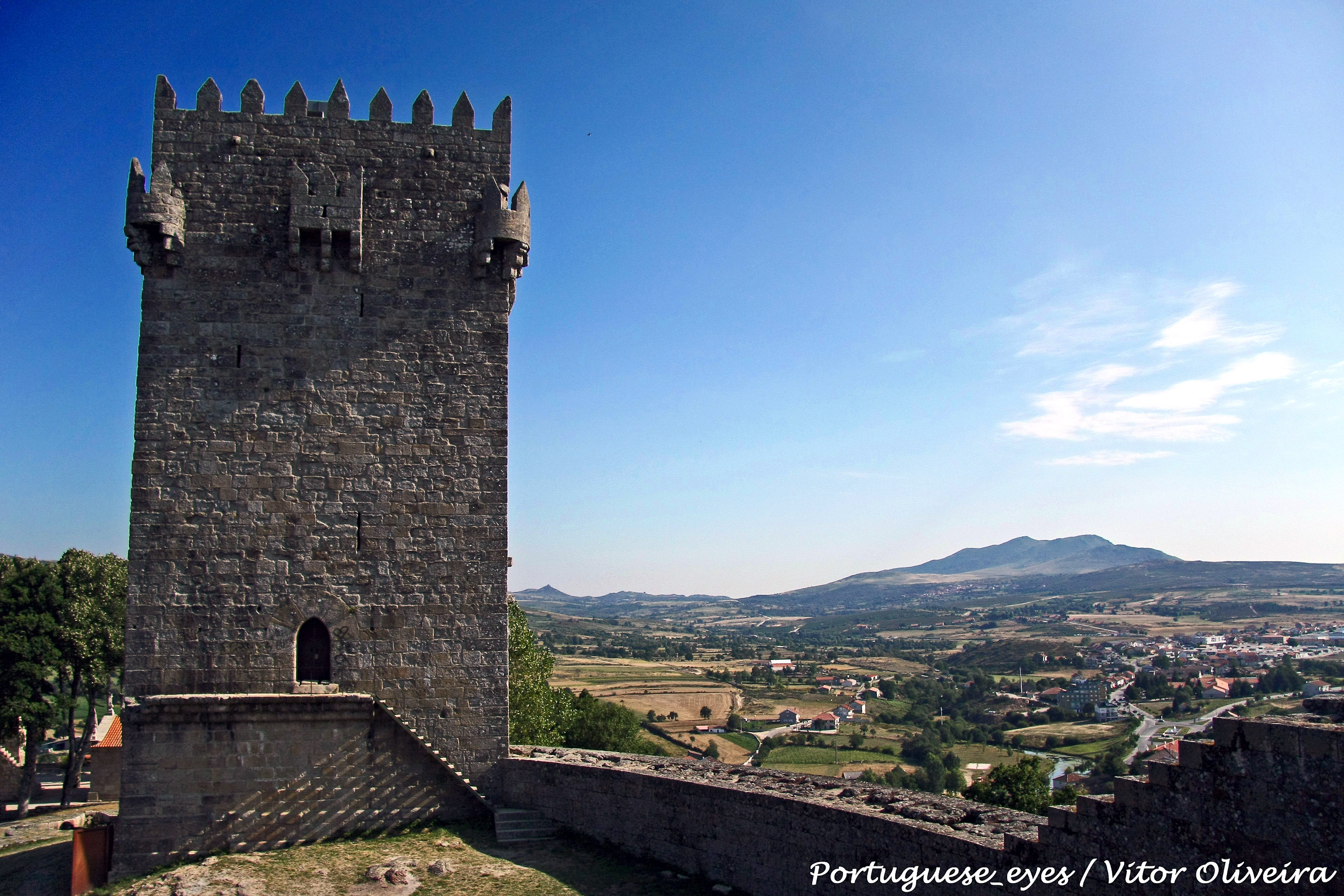
