= Boticas =

- Municipality
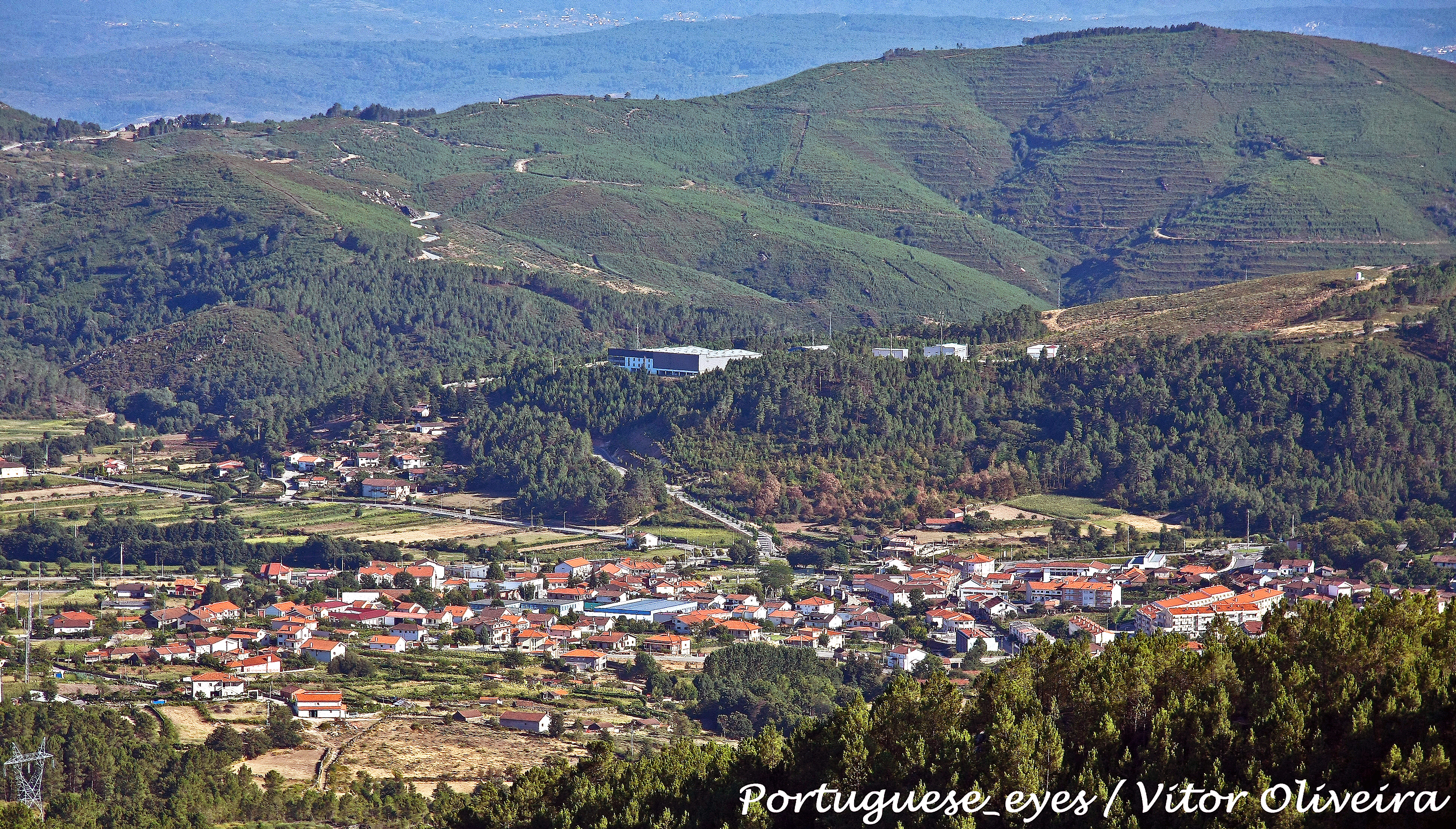
- Panorama of Boticas

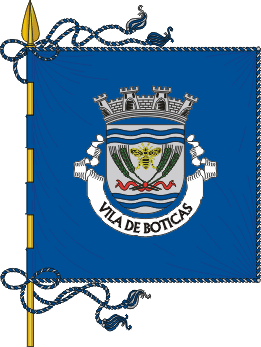
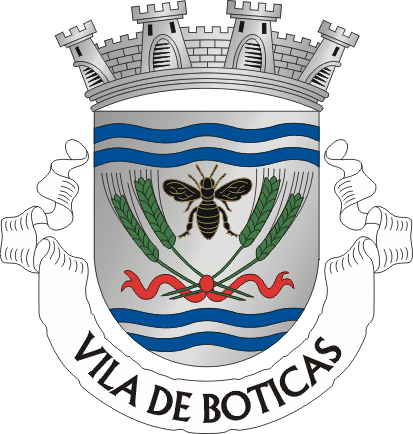
- Flag Coat of arms
- Interactive map of Boticas
- Location in Portugal
- Coordinates: 41°41′14″N 7°40′4″W
- Country: Portugal
- Region: Norte
- Intermunic. comm.: Alto Tâmega
- District: Vila Real
- Parishes: 10

Government
  - President: Fernando Pereira Campos

Area
  - Total: 321.96 km^{2} (124.31 sq mi)
- Elevation: 883 m (2,897 ft)

Population (2024)
  - Total: 4,832
  - Density: 15.01/km^{2} (38.87/sq mi)
- Time zone: UTC+00:00 (WET)
  - Summer (DST): UTC+01:00 (WEST)
- Postal code: 5460
- Area code: 276
- Patron: Nossa Senhora da Livração
- Website: https://www.cm-boticas.pt

Boticas (Portuguese pronunciation: [buˈtikɐʃ]) is a town and a municipality in northern Portugal, in the district of Vila Real and in the Trás-os-Montes region. Covering an area of 321.96 square kilometres (124.31 mi^{2}), it had a population of 4,832 in 2024, while the town of Boticas itself had 1,540 residents in 2021. The municipality is part of the Alto Tâmega intermunicipal community and, together with Montalegre, forms the historical and cultural Barroso region. Boticas is known for its archaeological heritage, including Iron Age castros and the finding of Gallaecian warrior statues.

== History ==
=== Prehistory and Antiquity ===
Human presence in the territory of Boticas dates back to prehistoric times and the Iron Age, as demonstrated by the numerous fortified settlements (castros) scattered across the municipality. Archaeologists have identified 27 such sites, of which the castros of Carvalhelhos and Lesenho are the most notable. Between the 2nd century BCE and the 1st century CE, and possibly earlier, tin was mined at Carvalhelhos. In Lesenho, excavations uncovered four statues of Gallaecian warriors, carved stone figures likely representing symbolic embodiments of local elites and their ancestral traditions, reinforcing the political and religious authority of the fortified settlements with which they were associated.

During the Roman period, there was significant gold and tin mining activity, leading to the establishment of a settlement named Batocas in the modern day parish of Ardãos e Bobadela. Archaeological evidence includes coins of emperors such as Hadrian and Constantine X Doukas, remains of thermal baths at Carvalhelhos and the Pedrinha bridge over the Beça River. By 314, Boticas (then referred to as Betecas or Beteca) became the seat of a Christian diocese. Its only recorded bishop, Sabino, is mentioned in 314, and the see appears to have been suppressed by around 400.

=== Middle Ages and Modern Era ===
During the early Middle Ages, the territory was traversed by successive waves of invading peoples, including the Suebi and Visigoths and later the Moors. Several local toponyms include the word Mouro (Moor) and are believed to date from this period, such as Côto dos Mouros, Penedo dos Mouros, Estrada dos Mouros, Cova da Moura, Moura Encantada and Mouril. The north of Portugal together with Boticas was reconquered by Catholic forces in the 9th century.

In the 13th century, two royal charters (forals) were issued to two settlements in modern day Boticas, Beça in 1203 and Codeçoso in 1258 by Afonso III. In 1273, Afonso III issued a foral to Montalegre, making it the seat of the Terras de Barroso administrative region, which also included Boticas and the now-extinct municipality of Ruivães. The Barroso family, named after a tower in the locality of Sipiões (Sapiãos), descended from the Guedeões lineage and rose to prominence during the conquest of Seville in 1247 by Ferdinand III of Castile.

In 1367, Ferdinand I granted the lands of Barroso to Rui Vasques Pereira, later transferring them to Vasco Gonçalves Barroso. Under John I, Boticas passed to Nuno Álvares Pereira, and from then the Terras de Barroso remained in the hands of the Dukes of Braganza and their descendants.

Boticas was established as a municipality on 6 November 1836 as part of the administrative reforms of that year, incorporating parishes from the neighbouring municipalities of Chaves and Montalegre and the former Couto de Dornelas.

== Geography ==
=== Physical geography ===
The municipality of Boticas is located in the Alto Tâmega intermunicipal community, within the district of Vila Real, in the Trás-os-Montes region, in northern Portugal. It is surrounded by five other municipalities: Montalegre to the north and west, Cabeceiras de Basto to the southwest, Ribeira de Pena and Vila Pouca de Aguiar to the south and Chaves to the east. Together with Montalegre, it makes up the Barroso region, a distinctive natural and cultural landscape characterized by rugged topography, high mountains, and broad plateaus.

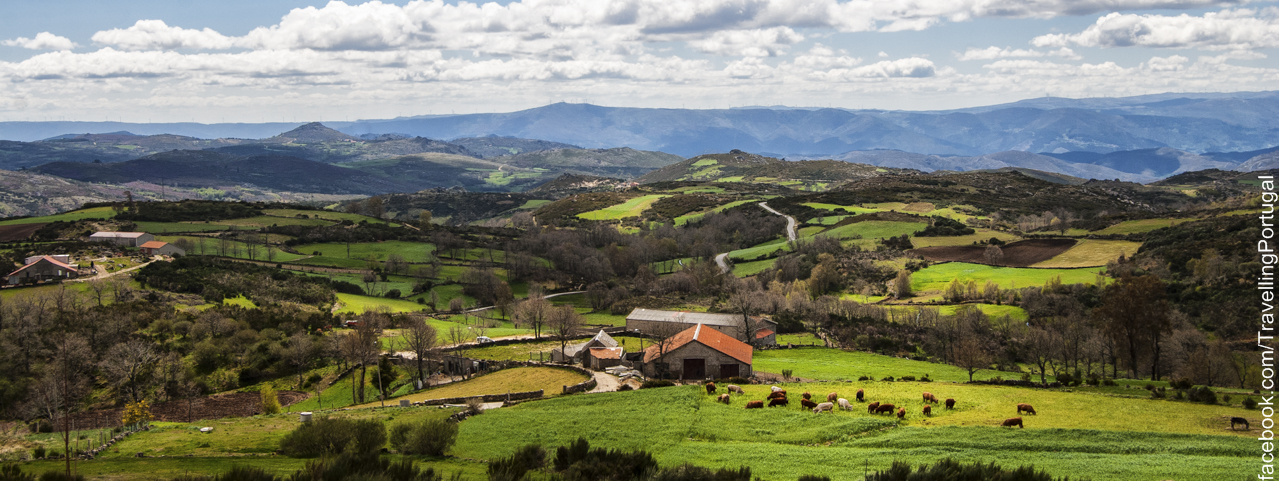
Barroso mountain range

The municipality covers an area of 321.96 square kilometres (124.31 mi^{2}), extending from the Barroso and Melcas mountain ranges to the west, to the Leiranco range to the northeast and to the Tâmega River in the southeast. There are two distinct agricultural zones in the municipality. The lower zone is formed by the interior watersheds of the Terva and Beça rivers and the right bank of the Tâmega. Although limited in size, it is among the most fertile areas, with abundant vegetation and a variety of crops, including vineyards, orchards, and cereals. In the higher zone, extensive natural meadows (lameiros) dominate, where rye and potatoes are cultivated on a large scale.

=== Climate ===
The climate is cold, but dry, conditioned by numerous factors, such as the latitude, altitude, its proximity to the ocean and the predominant vegetation. Its winters are characterized by long cold periods, interspersed by snowfalls and ice-storms, with several weeks of below zero temperatures. The spring, by rule, is very cool, and susceptible to cold-streaks until May, when the vegetation blooms. Summer temperatures can surpass 35/40°C.

=== Human geography ===
Population of Boticas (1849 - 2011)
Year	Pop.	±%
1849	10,226	—
1900	10,982	+7.4%
1930	11,154	+1.6%
1960	14,481	+29.8%
1981	8,773	−39.4%
1991	7,936	−9.5%
2001	6,417	−19.1%
2011	5,750	−10.4%
2021	5,000	−13.0%
2024	4,832	−3.4%

Administratively, the municipality is divided into 10 civil parishes (freguesias):

- Alturas do Barroso e Cerdedo
- Ardãos e Bobadela
- Beça
- Boticas e Granja
- Codessoso, Curros e Fiães do Tâmega
- Covas do Barroso
- Dornelas
- Pinho
- Sapiãos
- Vilar e Viveiro

== Economy ==
Boticas is known for vinho dos mortos (English: wine of the dead). During the invasion of the French army between 1807 and 1809 the inhabitants buried their locally produced wine in the sandy soil rather than let it fall into the hands of the enemy. After Napoleon's army, led by General Andoche Junot, was gone, they dug up the bottles. Initially fearing that the wine had spoiled, the locals found the low temperatures and darkness seemed to concentrate the flavors and improve the taste. The practice of burying them for about two years is still routine and the wine is sold under the title of Vinho Regional Transmontano with the label of Armindo Sousa Pereira.

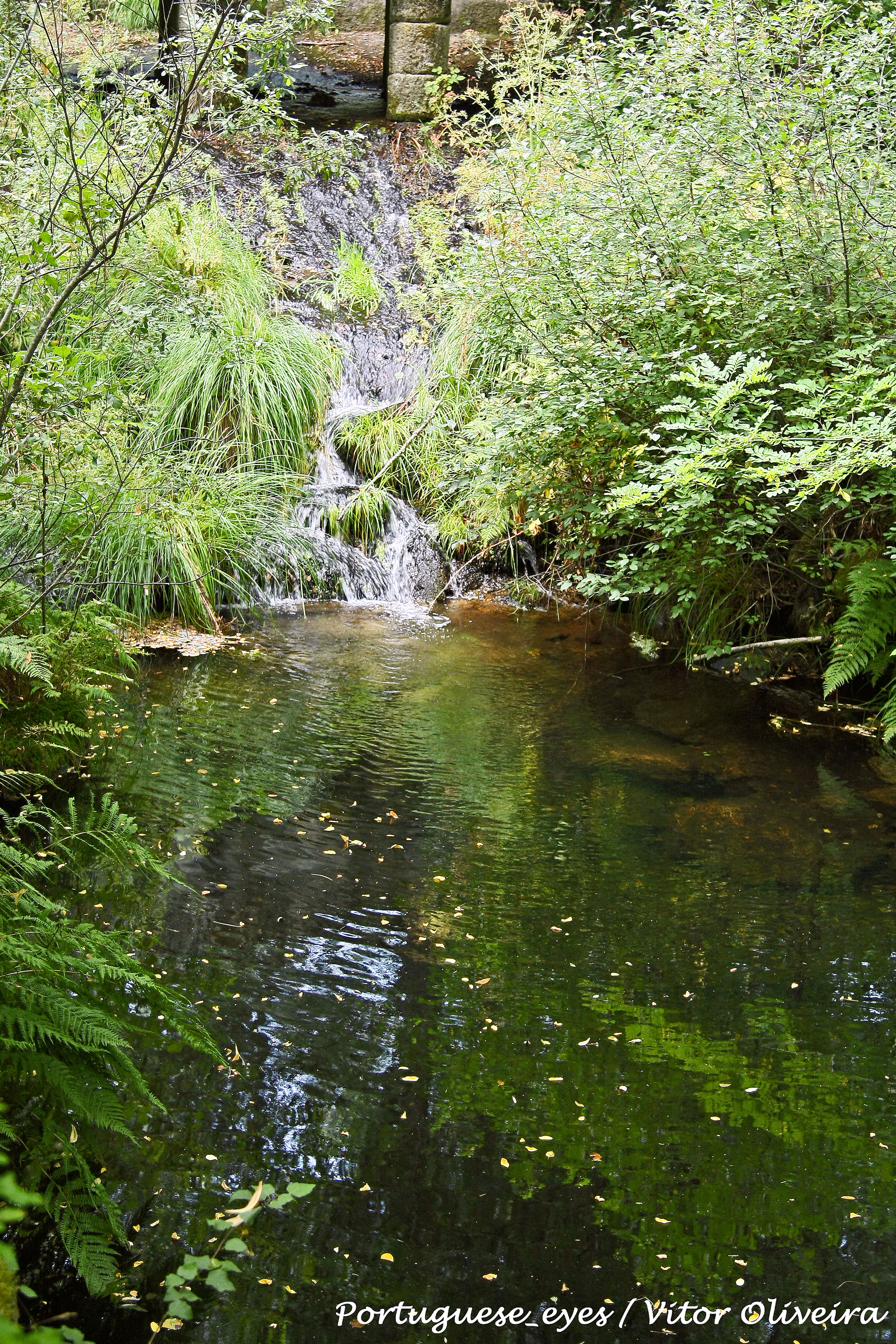
Spring in Carvalhelhos

Carvalhelhos in Boticas is known for its natural mineral water springs, located at an altitude of 800 metres (2,600 ft) at the foot of the Castro de Carvalhelhos and surrounded by the Barroso mountains. Mineral water has been bottled at this location since 1915, by the company Águas de Carvalhelhos. In 2022, the company reported revenues of around 7 million euros, producing 24 million litres of natural and carbonated mineral water. Approximately 15% of production was exported, mainly to the United Kingdom, the United States, Belgium, Canada, and Germany.

The municipality is home to what is considered the largest lithium spodumene reserve in Europe. Exploration work has indicated resources of around 40 million tonnes, with the potential to exceed 100 million tonnes over time, enough to supply lithium for approximately 47 million electric vehicles. The deposit is being developed by Savannah Resources, with production expected to begin in 2027, and in 2025 the project was designated as strategic by the European Commission. While the mine is expected to bring economic benefits, including job creation and tax revenue, it has also faced opposition from local communities and environmental groups concerned about its social and environmental impacts.

== Culture ==
The municipality is marked by the local gastronomy, which includes the local presunto, stuffed trout, smoked-meats and Barrosan veal.

=== Architecture ===
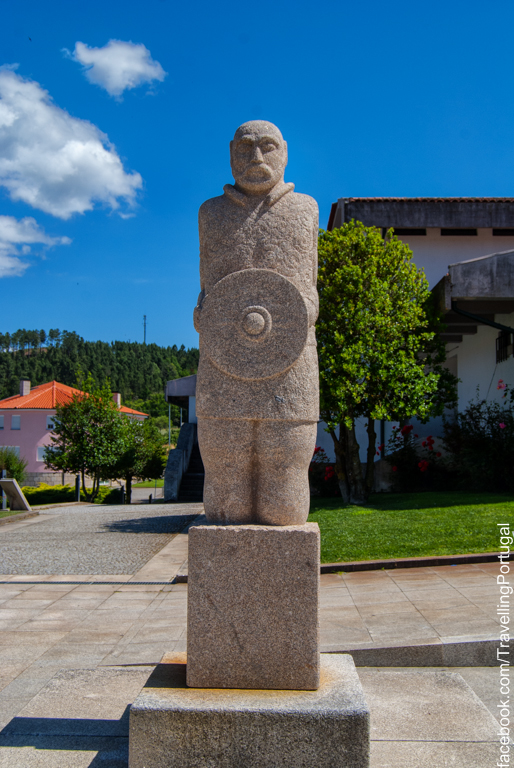
Replica of a Gallaecian warrior statue in Boticas

==== Civic ====
Boticas municipality preserves important archaeological remains from the Iron Age and Roman periods, particularly its fortified settlements (castros). Among the most notable are the Castro do Lesenho, a proto-urban settlement encircled by three defensive walls and containing circular stone dwellings, and the Castro de Carvalhelhos, where traces of rectangular and circular houses, ramparts, and defensive ditches have been identified.

The Castro do Lesenho is also associated with the discovery of four Gallaecian warrior statues, examples of late Iron Age statues in northwestern Iberia. They consist of anthropomorphic stone figures representing armed men with short hair, moustaches, beards, and round shields. Unearthed at different times since the 18th century and now preserved in the National Museum of Archaeology in Lisbon, they are regarded as emblematic representations of the Castro culture. Replicas of the statues are displayed in front of the Boticas town hall.

In addition to these remains, the municipality is home to a large number of traditional watermills. Around 240 examples have been identified, most of them small horizontal-wheel mills (rodízios) used historically for grinding grain, though a few vertical-wheel mills (azenhas) also exist.

==== Religious ====
- Roman Church of Beça
- Roman Church of Covas de Barroso
- Gothic Church of Lampiões
- Calvário de Covas do Barroso - a sacred road (Latin: via sacra) composed of several pillory-like crosses in the parish of Covas do Barroso;

== Notable people ==
- André Liberal (born 2002) a footballer with 68 club appearances.

== See also ==
- List of Catholic dioceses in Portugal
