= Montalegre e Padroso =

- Civil parish
- Location in Portugal
- Coordinates: 41.826°N 7.789°W
- Country: Portugal
- Region: Norte
- Intermunic. comm.: Douro
- District: Vila Real
- Municipality: Alijó

Area
  - Total: 32.15 km^{2} (12.41 sq mi)

Population (2011)
  - Total: 1,923
  - Density: 60/km^{2} (150/sq mi)
- Time zone: UTC+00:00 (WET)
  - Summer (DST): UTC+01:00 (WEST)

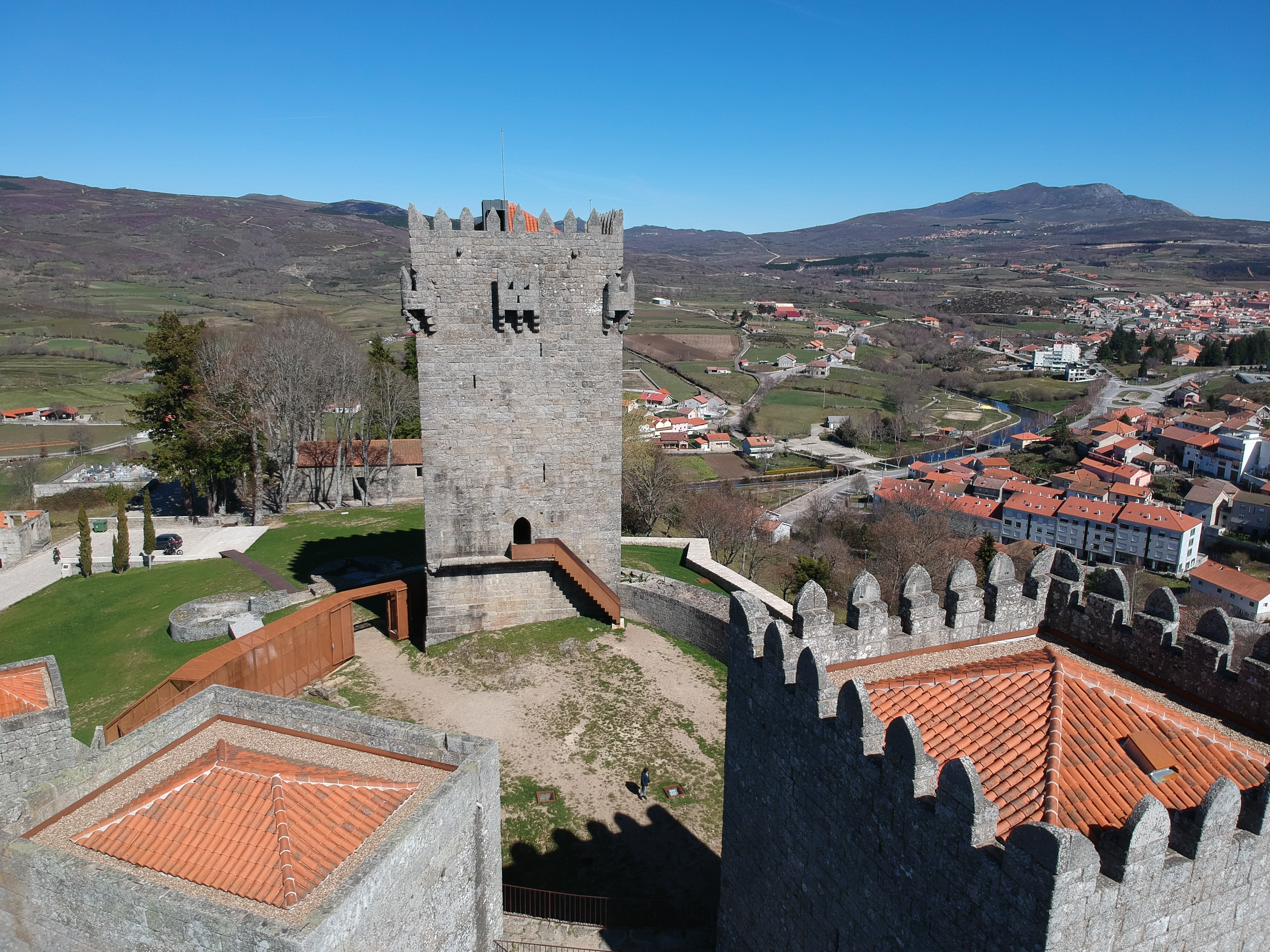

Montalegre e Padroso is a civil parish in the municipality of Montalegre, northern Portugal. It was formed in 2013 by the merger of the former parishes Montalegre and Padroso. The population in 2011 was 1,923, in an area of 32.15 km^{2}. It is the seat of Montalegre Municipality.
