= Montalegre =

- Municipality
- Town of Montalegre
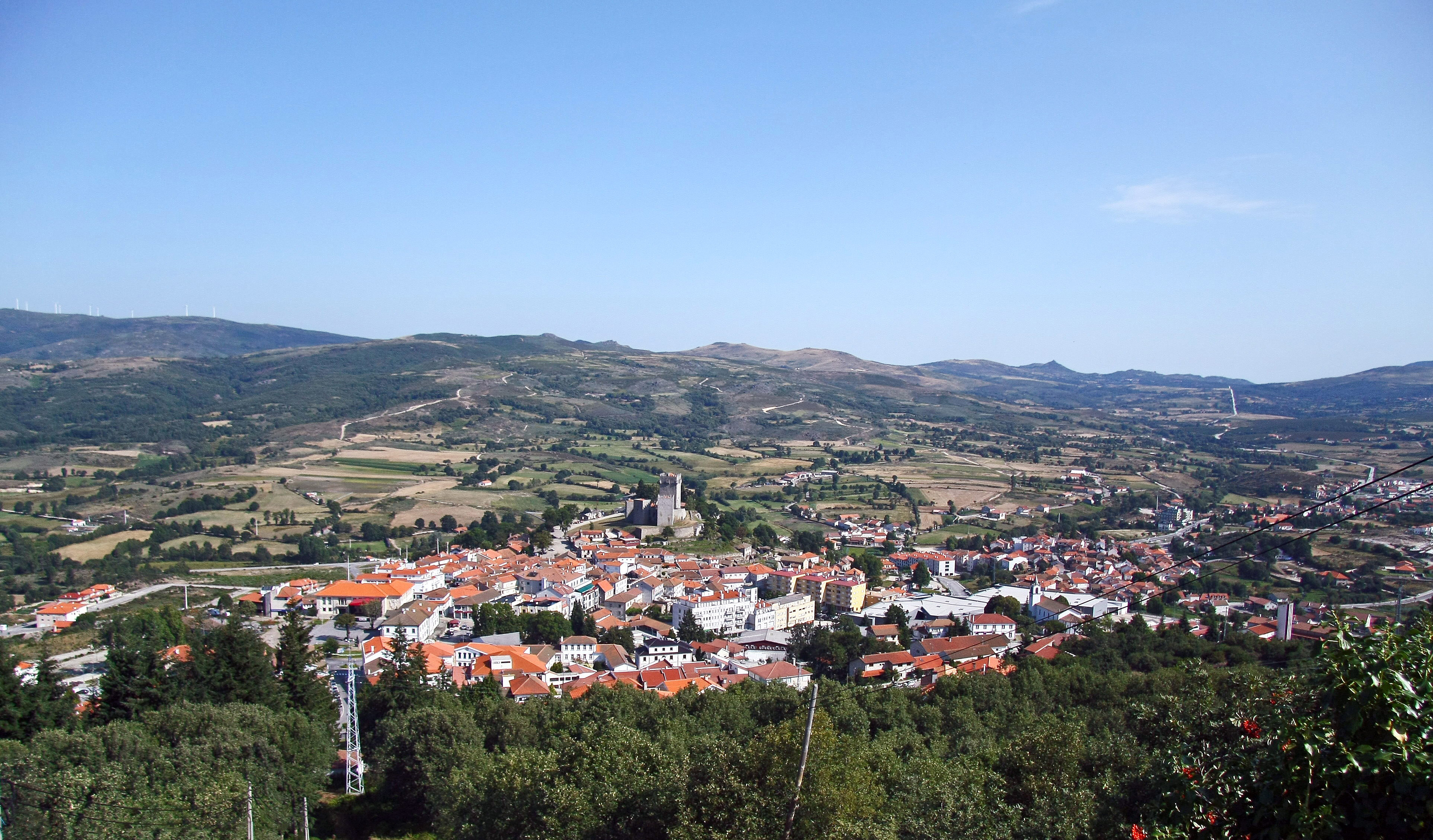
- Panorama of Montalegre

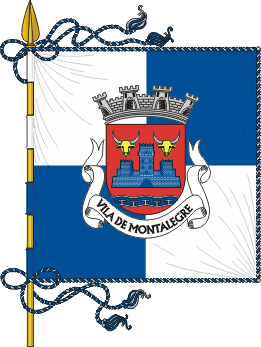
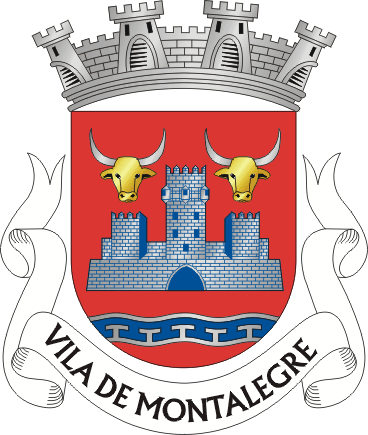
- Flag Coat of arms
- Interactive map of Montalegre
- Coordinates: 41°49′23″N 7°47′30″W
- Country: Portugal
- Region: Norte
- Intermunic. comm.: Alto Tâmega
- District: Vila Real
- Seat: Montalegre Municipal Chamber
- Parishes: 27 (see text)

Government
  - President: Orlando Alves (PS)

Area
  - Total: 805.46 km^{2} (310.99 sq mi)
- Elevation: 1,000 m (3,300 ft)

Population (2011)
  - Total: 10,537
  - Density: 13.082/km^{2} (33.882/sq mi)
- Time zone: UTC+00:00 (WET)
  - Summer (DST): UTC+01:00 (WEST)
- Postal code: 5470
- Area code: 276
- Patron: Nossa Senhora da Piedade
- Website: http://www.cm-montalegre.pt

Montalegre (Portuguese pronunciation: [mõtɐˈlɛɣɾɨ]), officially the Town of Montalegre (Portuguese: Vila de Montalegre), is a municipality in northern Portugal, located in the district of Vila Real, along the border with Spain. The population in 2011 was 10,537, in an area of 805.46 km².

== History ==
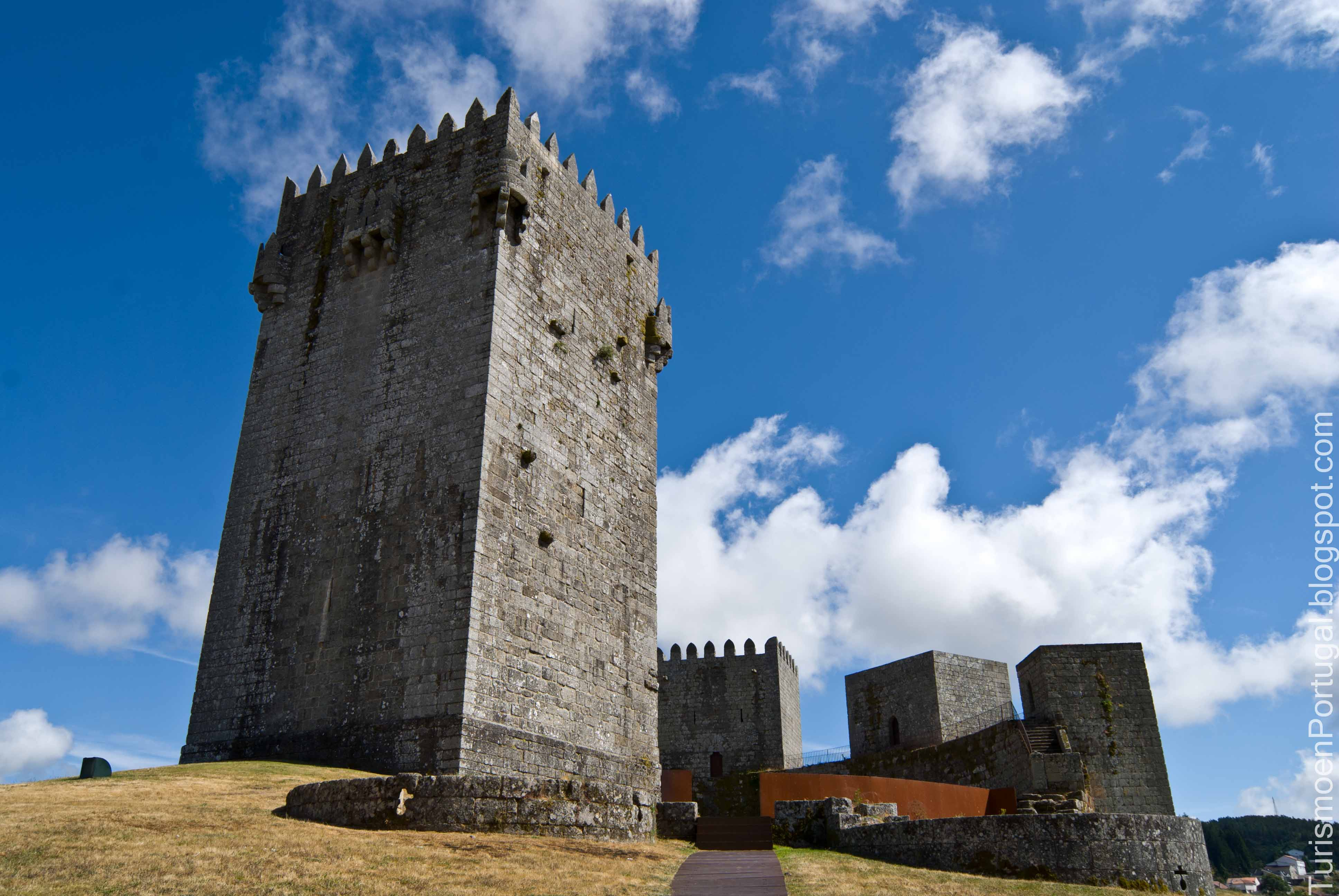
Castle of Montalegre

Early construction in Montalegre date back 3500–4000 years when early inhabitants, around the villages of Mourela, Veiga and Vila da Ponte, buried their dead in funeral mounds. Vestiges of this culture predominate the region, and suggest that settlements have been ongoing since the Metal Ages.

Celt colonies began to appear afterward, constructing castros in many of the places that developed into formal settlements. With the arrival of the Romans, bridges and formal roads began to appear, while many of the castros began to be converted into Roman encampments, later the nuclei of formalized settlements. Remains of the Roman civitas are still common: Praesidium (in Vila da Ponte, popularly known as Sabaraz) and Caladunum (in Cervos).

There were no overt indications that the Moors settled in this region, although oral tradition inferred as much.

With the establishment of the Christian kingdom of Portugal, Afonso Henriques donated portions of the land for charitable hospices (Salto), hospitals (Vilar de Perdizes and Dornelas) or monasteries (Pitões). Owing to its location, on the border with Galiza, defense fortifications were constructed, including the Castles of Gerês and Piconha, and later in Portelo and the village of Montalegre. A lighthouse was also constructed in Tourém, likely by King Sancho in 1187, since he was the master of the Terras da Piconha region.

It was only in September 1273 that King Afonso III bestowed on the citizens a foral (charter), founding the town of Montalegre and making the local sheriff the master of the Terras de Barroso. The foral was later confirmed by King Denis in 1289, and renewed by Afonso IV (in 1340), John II (in 1491), and Manuel (in 1515).

After the Portuguese Interregnum, during the reign of John I, the Terras de Barroso were offered as a gift to Nuno Álvares Pereira for his support.

In 1809, French troops had problems in the region, during the Peninsular Wars, fighting off the Barrosões, in Misarela.

On 6 November 1836, the municipality of Montalegre was divided, in order to create the municipality of Boticas. In course, the parishes of Vilar de Vacas was lost to the neighbouring municipality of Vieira do Minho, and later the parish of Couto Misto de Santiago de Rubiás, was also de-annexed.

Contemporary history of the municipality has been marked by growing emigration, the result of the lack of economic recourse and the abandonment of traditional activities. The institutionalization of local government permitted a revitalization in the municipality, after the Carnation Revolution, which saw a growth in tertiary activities.

== Geography ==
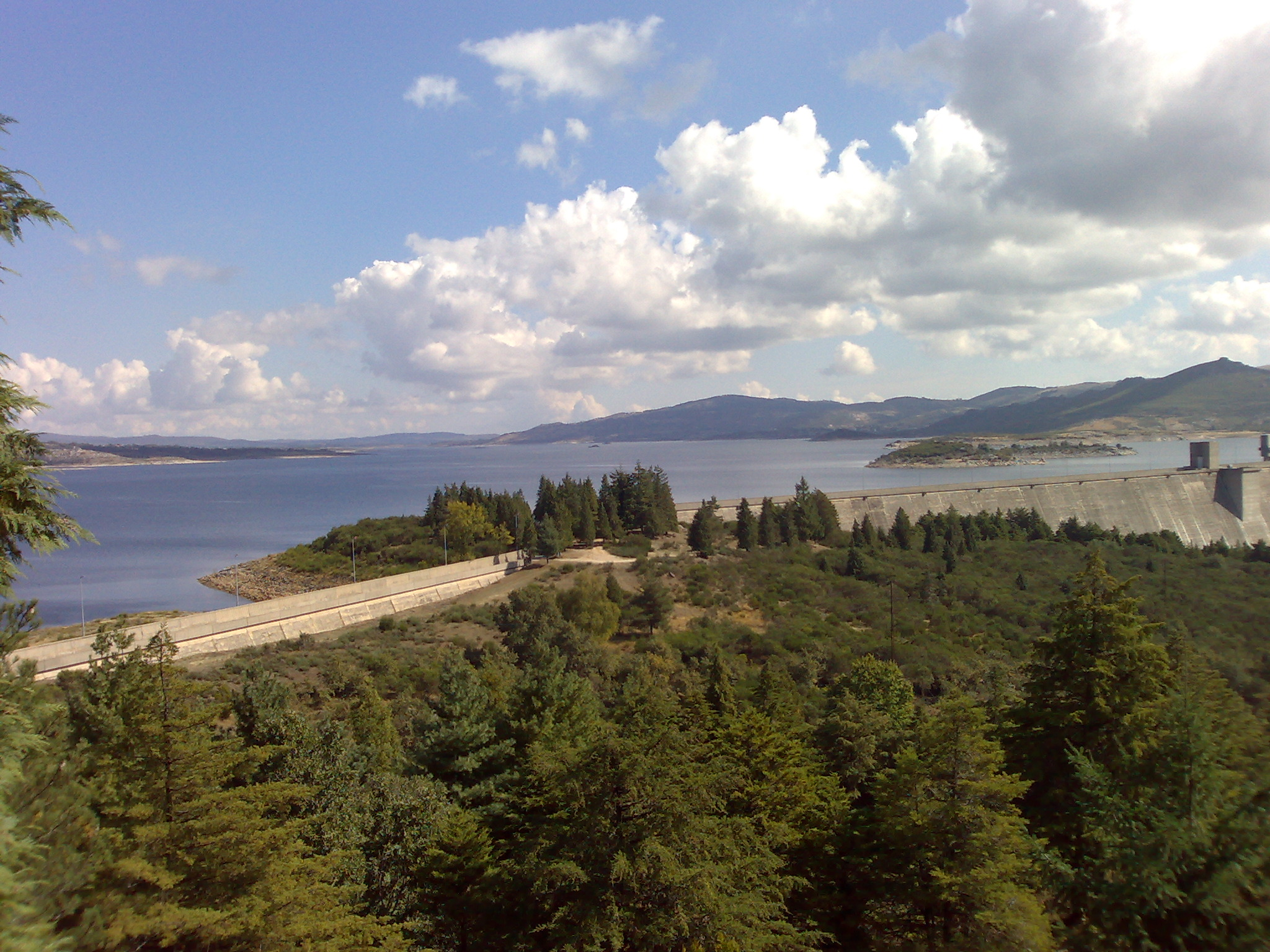
The Alto Rabagão Dam and reservoir, central to four parishes of the municipality

Montalegre is one of the two municipalities that compose the region of Barroso. The Peneda-Gerês National Park comprises 26,26% of its area (211,74 km² out of a total 806,19 km² belonging to that park).

=== Climate ===
At an elevation of 1,000 m (3,281 ft) above sea level, Montalegre has a cool Mediterranean climate (Köppen: Csb). There is a short dry season in summer, but overall plenty of precipitation annually. The average annual temperature is around 10 °C (50 °F) and the average annual rainfall is around 1,400 mm (55 in). The driest month is July, with 23 mm (0.91 in). Most precipitation falls in December, with an average of 252 mm (9.9 in).

Summers are pleasant and dry, and winters are chilly and snowy.

Climate data for Montalegre, 1991–2020 normals and extremes
Month	Jan	Feb	Mar	Apr	May	Jun	Jul	Aug	Sep	Oct	Nov	Dec	Year
Record high °C (°F)	18.3 (64.9)	21.2 (70.2)	22.9 (73.2)	26.0 (78.8)	30.6 (87.1)	34.0 (93.2)	34.8 (94.6)	36.8 (98.2)	33.7 (92.7)	29.2 (84.6)	20.3 (68.5)	17.5 (63.5)	36.8 (98.2)
Mean daily maximum °C (°F)	7.7 (45.9)	8.9 (48.0)	11.7 (53.1)	13.5 (56.3)	17.2 (63.0)	21.7 (71.1)	24.9 (76.8)	24.9 (76.8)	21.2 (70.2)	15.6 (60.1)	10.5 (50.9)	8.5 (47.3)	15.5 (59.9)
Daily mean °C (°F)	4.3 (39.7)	5.0 (41.0)	7.3 (45.1)	8.7 (47.7)	12.0 (53.6)	15.7 (60.3)	18.4 (65.1)	18.4 (65.1)	15.5 (59.9)	11.4 (52.5)	7.1 (44.8)	5.1 (41.2)	10.7 (51.3)
Mean daily minimum °C (°F)	0.9 (33.6)	1.0 (33.8)	2.9 (37.2)	4.0 (39.2)	6.7 (44.1)	9.7 (49.5)	11.8 (53.2)	11.9 (53.4)	9.8 (49.6)	7.2 (45.0)	3.6 (38.5)	1.8 (35.2)	5.9 (42.6)
Record low °C (°F)	−8.5 (16.7)	−7.7 (18.1)	−10.2 (13.6)	−4.0 (24.8)	−1.5 (29.3)	1.2 (34.2)	3.8 (38.8)	3.5 (38.3)	2.1 (35.8)	−2.1 (28.2)	−6.5 (20.3)	−8.0 (17.6)	−10.2 (13.6)
Average precipitation mm (inches)	208.6 (8.21)	130.7 (5.15)	149.1 (5.87)	125.7 (4.95)	114.0 (4.49)	45.1 (1.78)	23.6 (0.93)	30.3 (1.19)	69.7 (2.74)	199.8 (7.87)	178.9 (7.04)	217.5 (8.56)	1,493 (58.78)
Average precipitation days (≥ 1 mm)	13.4	9.9	10.7	11.6	10.1	4.9	3.3	3.4	6.1	12.0	12.8	13.4	111.7
Source: Instituto Português do Mar e da Atmosfera

Climate data for Montalegre, elevation: 1,005 m or 3,297 ft, 1971-2000 normals and extremes
Month	Jan	Feb	Mar	Apr	May	Jun	Jul	Aug	Sep	Oct	Nov	Dec	Year
Record high °C (°F)	17.0 (62.6)	19.0 (66.2)	22.5 (72.5)	24.5 (76.1)	27.6 (81.7)	33.0 (91.4)	35.0 (95.0)	34.5 (94.1)	34.0 (93.2)	25.1 (77.2)	21.5 (70.7)	18.1 (64.6)	35.0 (95.0)
Mean daily maximum °C (°F)	7.3 (45.1)	8.3 (46.9)	10.4 (50.7)	11.9 (53.4)	15.3 (59.5)	20.2 (68.4)	23.9 (75.0)	23.8 (74.8)	20.6 (69.1)	14.7 (58.5)	10.6 (51.1)	8.2 (46.8)	14.6 (58.3)
Daily mean °C (°F)	3.9 (39.0)	4.6 (40.3)	6.2 (43.2)	7.5 (45.5)	10.5 (50.9)	14.6 (58.3)	17.8 (64.0)	17.6 (63.7)	15.2 (59.4)	10.6 (51.1)	7.1 (44.8)	5.0 (41.0)	10.1 (50.1)
Mean daily minimum °C (°F)	0.5 (32.9)	1.1 (34.0)	2.1 (35.8)	3.2 (37.8)	5.7 (42.3)	9.1 (48.4)	11.7 (53.1)	11.4 (52.5)	9.9 (49.8)	6.5 (43.7)	3.5 (38.3)	1.8 (35.2)	5.5 (42.0)
Record low °C (°F)	−9.5 (14.9)	−9.5 (14.9)	−7.7 (18.1)	−4.0 (24.8)	−2.5 (27.5)	−1.1 (30.0)	4.4 (39.9)	4.5 (40.1)	1.3 (34.3)	−2.4 (27.7)	−5.6 (21.9)	−6.5 (20.3)	−9.5 (14.9)
Average rainfall mm (inches)	196.7 (7.74)	171.0 (6.73)	98.8 (3.89)	112.4 (4.43)	112.2 (4.42)	59.1 (2.33)	22.7 (0.89)	26.1 (1.03)	72.4 (2.85)	159.1 (6.26)	150.9 (5.94)	252.2 (9.93)	1,433.6 (56.44)
Average rainy days (≥ 0.1 mm)	16.6	15.3	14.0	14.1	13.1	9.8	5.5	5.0	8.1	14.2	13.8	16.7	146.2
Average snowy days	4.7	3.8	3.7	2.2	0.5	0	0	0	0	0.2	1.1	2.3	18.5
Mean monthly sunshine hours	110.9	113.3	164.1	184.2	220.5	269.4	322.5	312.7	226.6	160.2	125.4	95.4	2,305.2
Source: Instituto Português do Mar e da Atmosfera

Climate data for Cabril, elevation: 585 m or 1,919 ft, 1982-2000 normals and extremes
Month	Jan	Feb	Mar	Apr	May	Jun	Jul	Aug	Sep	Oct	Nov	Dec	Year
Record high °C (°F)	20.5 (68.9)	23.0 (73.4)	27.0 (80.6)	29.0 (84.2)	31.2 (88.2)	36.3 (97.3)	38.0 (100.4)	38.0 (100.4)	36.0 (96.8)	31.7 (89.1)	24.5 (76.1)	22.0 (71.6)	38.0 (100.4)
Mean daily maximum °C (°F)	11.5 (52.7)	12.6 (54.7)	16.1 (61.0)	16.2 (61.2)	19.2 (66.6)	23.6 (74.5)	27.0 (80.6)	27.1 (80.8)	24.0 (75.2)	18.8 (65.8)	14.5 (58.1)	12.2 (54.0)	18.6 (65.4)
Daily mean °C (°F)	8.0 (46.4)	8.8 (47.8)	11.3 (52.3)	11.7 (53.1)	14.4 (57.9)	18.4 (65.1)	21.1 (70.0)	21.2 (70.2)	18.8 (65.8)	14.7 (58.5)	11.1 (52.0)	8.9 (48.0)	14.0 (57.3)
Mean daily minimum °C (°F)	4.4 (39.9)	4.9 (40.8)	6.6 (43.9)	7.1 (44.8)	9.5 (49.1)	12.9 (55.2)	15.2 (59.4)	15.2 (59.4)	13.6 (56.5)	10.5 (50.9)	7.6 (45.7)	5.7 (42.3)	9.4 (49.0)
Record low °C (°F)	−6.0 (21.2)	−3.2 (26.2)	−2.0 (28.4)	−1.0 (30.2)	2.3 (36.1)	4.2 (39.6)	8.0 (46.4)	8.0 (46.4)	5.0 (41.0)	4.0 (39.2)	−0.5 (31.1)	−0.2 (31.6)	−6.0 (21.2)
Average rainfall mm (inches)	151.0 (5.94)	141.5 (5.57)	66.3 (2.61)	115.6 (4.55)	99.2 (3.91)	45.1 (1.78)	19.8 (0.78)	28.0 (1.10)	66.7 (2.63)	140.8 (5.54)	176.2 (6.94)	195.5 (7.70)	1,245.7 (49.05)
Average rainy days (≥ 0.1 mm)	11.9	9.7	6.5	10.0	9.0	4.7	2.7	3.1	5.8	10.3	11.8	12.3	97.8
Mean monthly sunshine hours	130.6	127.9	193.9	174.2	222.6	270.8	313.7	297.4	228.4	160.5	113.5	99.5	2,333
Source: Instituto Português do Mar e da Atmosfera

=== Human geography ===
Administratively, the municipality is divided into 27 civil parishes that administer local area government and support the local populations:

- Cabril
- Cambeses do Rio, Donões e Mourilhe
- Cervos
- Chã
- Covelo do Gerês
- Ferral
- Frades do Rio
- Gralhas
- Meixedo e Padornelos
- Montalegre e Padroso
- Morgade
- Negrões
- Outeiro
- Paradela, Contim e Fiães
- Peireses
- Pitões das Júnias
- Reigoso
- Salto
- Santo André
- Sarraquinhos
- Sezelhe e Covelães
- Solveira
- Tourém
- Venda Nova e Pondras
- Viade de Baixo e Fervidelas
- Vila da Ponte
- Vilar de Perdizes e Meixide

== Notable people ==
- Delfim Modesto Brandão (1835–??) the penultimate "Juiz" (head of state) of the micro-state of Couto Misto which lasted 4 years from 1864.
- Bento António Gonçalves (1902–1942) the second Secretary General of the Portuguese Communist Party.
- Juan Rodríguez Cabrillo, first European to reach California
- Maria Eugénia Neto (b. 1934), First Lady of Angola

== See also ==
- Montalegre Castle
- Couto Misto
