= Gallaecian warrior statues =

Series of sculptures

The Gallaecian warrior statues are a series of sculptures produced in northwest Iberia (today Galicia and northern Portugal) in the immediate pre-Roman period. Usually associated with the Gallaecian tribal complex they are also sometimes described as statues of Lusitanian, Luso-Gallaecian or Castro Culture origin.

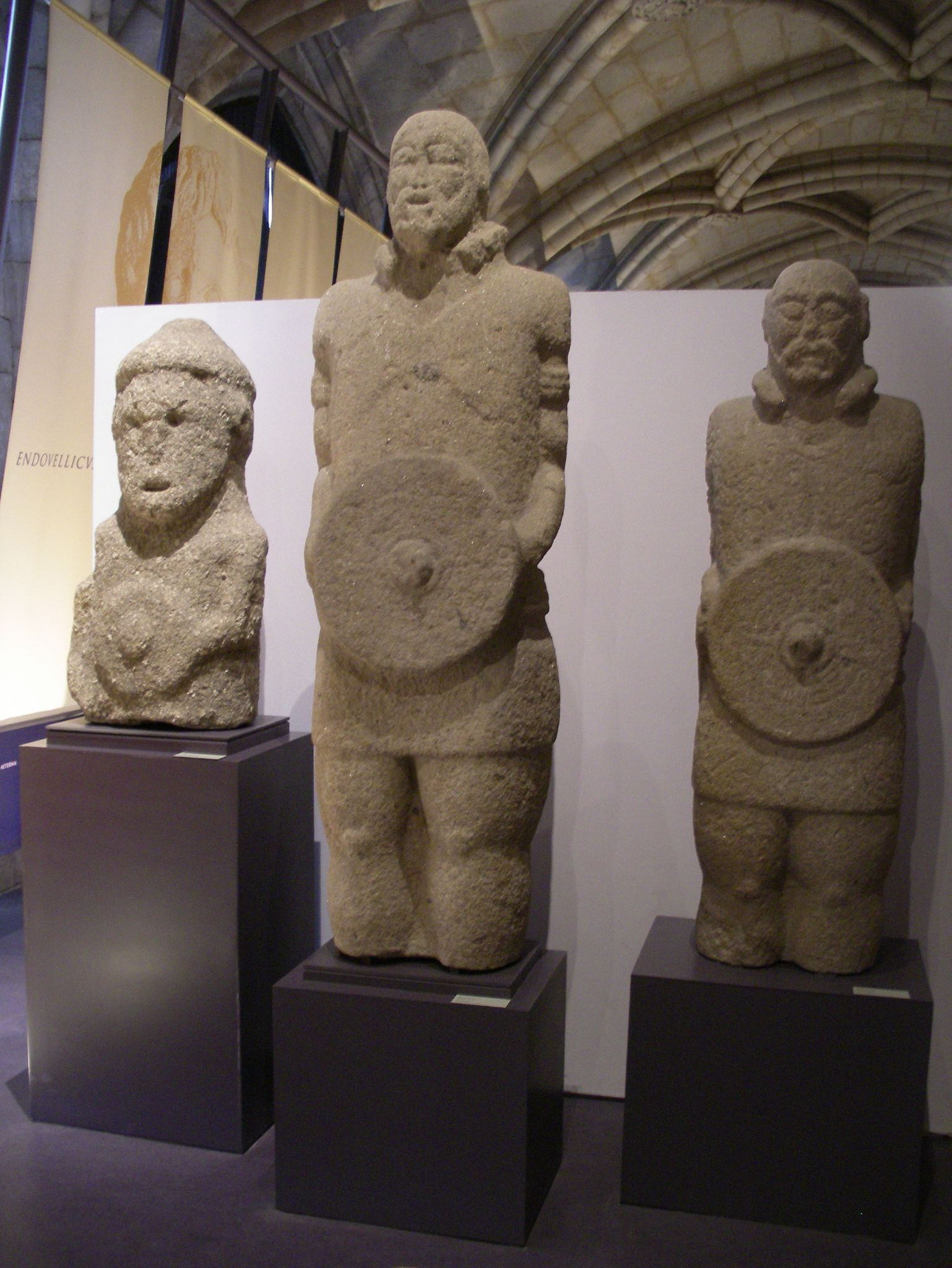
Gallaecian Warrior Statues in the Lisbon Museum of Archaeology

Showing armed men slightly larger than natural size, the statues are believed to represent deified local heroes and to date principally from between the 2nd Century BCE to the 1st Century CE.
