= Alto Tâmega e Barroso =

- Intermunicipal community
- Logo
- Interactive map of Alto Tâmega e Barroso
- Location in Portugal
- Coordinates: 41°42′N 7°32′W
- Country: Portugal
- Region: Northern Portugal
- Established: 2014
- Seat: Chaves
- Municipalities: 6

Government
  - President: Nuno Vaz Ribeiro

Area
  - Total: 2,921.91 km^{2} (1,128.16 sq mi)

Population (2011)
  - Total: 94,143
  - Density: 32.220/km^{2} (83.449/sq mi)
- Time zone: UTC+00:00 (WET)
  - Summer (DST): UTC+01:00 (WEST)
- Website: cimat.pt

The Alto Tâmega e Barroso, officially the Alto Tâmega e Barroso Intermunicipal Community, is an administrative division in northern Portugal. It was created in 2014. Since January 2015, Alto Tâmega e Barroso is also a NUTS3 subregion of Norte Region, that covers the same area as the intermunicipal community. The seat of the intermunicipal community is Chaves. Alto Tâmega e Barroso comprises the northern part of the Vila Real District. The population in 2011 was 94,143, in an area of 2,921.91 km².

== Municipalities ==
The intermunicipal community of Alto Tâmega e Barroso consists of 6 municipalities:

Municipality	Population (2011)	Area (km²)
Boticas	5,750	321.96
Chaves	41,243	591.23
Montalegre	10,537	805.46
Ribeira de Pena	6,544	217.46
Valpaços	16,882	548.74
Vila Pouca de Aguiar	13,187	437.07
Total	94,143	2,921.91
