= Mangalorean Catholic name =

Mangalorean Catholic names and surnames encompass the different naming conventions of the Mangalorean Catholic community. Historically, many of them had names of Christian saints, while Portuguese-language surnames were most commonly found. A formal Mangalorean Catholic name consists of a given name, a middle name, and a surname.

Mangalorean Catholics use English forms of their names and surnames in English-language contexts and their native language Konkani forms in Konkani-language contexts.

== Male given names ==
Most Mangalorean Catholic names for males follow the second declension. However, if the name ends in e, it follows the first declension, such as Zoze (Joseph). If the name ends in o, it follows the third declension, such as Lorso (Lawrence). The name follows the fourth declension if it ends in i, such as Jākki (Joachim). The fifth declension is observed if the name ends in u, such as Gabru (Gabriel), or if it ends in ãuñ, such as Zuãuñ (John).

Males
Mangalorean Catholic variant	Portuguese variant	English/anglicized variant	Meaning
Saver	Xavier	Xavier	new house
Valentin	Valentim	Valentine	strong, healthy
Simāuň	Simão	Simon	he has heard
Sebastiauň or Bastiauň	Sebastião	Sebastian	
Salvador or Saldor	Salvador	Salvador	Saviour
Rozār or Ruzār	Rosário	Rosario	Rosary
Kalvin	Kalvino	Calvin	Court Jester
Filip	Filipe or Felipe	Philip	friend of horses
Paullu or Paullā	Paulo	Paul	Humble
Pāsku	Pascoal	Pascal	associated with Passover (or Easter)
Niklāuň or Niku	Nicolau or Nico (informal)	Nicholas	Victory of the people
Mortin	Martim	Martin	Warlike
Mortes	Mateus	Matthew	Gift of God
Luis	Luís	Lewis	Famous warrior
Lorso or Lores	Lourenço	Laurence	from Laurentum, an ancient Roman city
Lazar or Lādru	Lázaro	Lazarus	God has helped
Jākki or Jokki	Joaquim or Jaquim (informal)	Joachim	
Jākob or Jāku	Jacob or Jacó	James	Holds the heel
Mingel	Miguel	Michael	Who is like God?
Pedru	Pedro	Peter	Stone
Šila	Silvestre	Sylvester	Wooded
Zuãuñ	João	John	God is gracious
Zoze	José	Joseph	The Lord will add
Source: English-Konkani Dictionary (2001)

== Female given names ==
Mangalorean Catholic female naming conventions differ for married or grown up females and young girls. In case of married or grown up females, most names (more distinctly names ending in a or e) follow the first declension.

Females
Mangalorean Catholic variant	Portuguese variant	English/anglicized variant	Meaning
Zúān	Joana	Jane	Yahweh (God) is gracious
Lus or Lujeň	Luz or Lúcia	Lucy	Light
Luisā	Luísa	Louisa	
Mornel	Madalena	Magdalene	
Martu	Marta	Martha	the lady
Rakel	Raquel	Rachel	one with purity
Rejin	Regina	Regina	Queen
Ritu	Rita	Rita	
Rozzi	Rosa	Rose	
Sobin	Sabina	Sabina	
Serpin	Serafina	Serafina	
Monku	Mónica	Monica	To advise
Nâtu	Natália	Natalia	Birthday
Zâbel	Isabel	Elizabeth	My God is my oath
Source: English-Konkani Dictionary (2001)

== Surnames ==
After the Portuguese conquest of Goa in 1510, the Portuguese consolidated their power by imposing their own government and cultural institutions in Goa. They also started spreading Christianity in Goa & many converted to Christianity. The Christians adopted Portuguese surnames but retained their Konkani customs & values. These Christians migrated to South Canara, due to the religious intolerance of the Goa Inquisition (1560), the Mahratta Invasion of Goa and Bombay in the late 17th century, food shortages, epidemics, heavy taxation & other causes.

After these Konkani migrants settled in South Canara, they continued using Portuguese surnames bestowed on their ancestors. Some families, however, still use their original Bammon & Charoda surnames. Some still do have Hindu surnames such as Shett, Shenoy, Kamath, Padval etc. These ancestral pre-conversion surnames of the Mangalorean Catholics are called paik in Konkani. Mudartha-D'Souza is a unique Mangalorean Catholic surname to be found among some who hail from the Udupi district.

Presently, Portuguese surnames are also observed in Goan Catholics, Bombay East Indian Catholics, Damanese Catholics & some other Christians in India. Portuguese surnames are popular in some parts of the world, they significant in Portugal, Brazil, Macao, Angola, Cape Verde, East Timor, Equatorial Guinea, Guinea-Bissau, São Tomé and Príncipe and Mozambique.

Bold indicates common surnames
Italics indicates uncommon surnames

(Portugal) **Portuguese Surnames**
A	B	C	D	E	F	G	H	I	J	K	L	M
Adailton	Bandeira	Cabral	da Costa	Esteves	Faria	Gama	**Henriques**				**Lopes**	𝐌𝐢𝐫𝐚𝐥𝐥𝐞𝐬
**Abreu**	**Baptista**	**Caeiro**	da Rosa	Estibeiro	**Fernandes**	**Gomes**	Horta				**Lasrado**	**Martin**
Ademir	**Bacardo**	**Caiado**	**de Costa**	Estrocio	**Ferreira**	**Gonsalves**					**Lobo**	Martins
**Afonso**	Barbosa	**Calado**	**de Cunha**		Figueira	Gonçalves					**Luis**	Medeiros
Agostinho	**Barboz**	**Calisto**	**de Mello**		**Furtado**	**Gracias**					**Lewis**	Mendonça
**Aguiar**	**Barcelos**	**Camara**	**de Penha**		**Fonseca**	**Goveas**						**Mendonca**
**Alberto**	**Barco**	Câmara	**de Souza**		**Ferrao**							**Menezes**
**Albuquerque**	**Barnes**	**Campos**	**D'Costa**									**Moraes**
**Alcantara**	**Barreto**	**Cardinho**	**D'Cunha**									**Machado**
**Aldeia**	**Barros**	**Cardoso**	**D'Mello**									**Mendes**
**Alemao**	Batista	**Caridade**	**D'Penha**									Miranda
**Almeida**	**Benedicto**	**Carlos**	**D'Souza**									**Madtha**
**Alva**	**Benjamin**	**Carmo**	**Dias**									**Martis**
**Alvares**	Bennis	**Carneiro**	**Dorado**									**Mathias**
Álvares	**Bento**	**Carrasco**	**D'Silva**									**Misquith**
Alves	**Borges**	Carreira	**de Silva**									**Monis**
Alves da Silva	**Botelho**	**Carvalho**	**Dourado**									**Monteiro**
Alvim	Braga	**Castanha**	**D'sa**									**Mascarenhas**
**Amaral**	Branco	**Castelino**	**Domingo**									**Moras**
Amarildo	**Brandao**	**Castellino**	Danthi									
**Ambrose**	Brandão	**Catao**										
**Amor**	**Brito**	**Cavaco**										
Amorim	**Britto**	**Cereja**										
**Andrade**	**Bruno**	**Chico**										
Antunes	**Buthello**	**Clement**										
**Aranha**	Betancourt	**Coelho**										
Araújo	Biscoito	**Colaço**										
Assunção	Brazão	**Coma**										
**Aurora**	**Barrows**	**Conceicao**										
**Azavedo**		Conceição										
**Azevedo**		**Concessao**										
Alfonso		**Corda**										
**Abreo**		**Cordeiro**										
		**Cordo**										
		**Correia**										
		**Corte-Real**										
		Corte-Real										
		**Costa**										
		**Coutinho**										
		**Couto**										
		**Crasta**										
		**Crasto**										
		**Criado**										
		**Cruz**										
		**Cunha**										
N	O	P	Q	R	S	T	U	V	W	X	Y	Z
Nascimento	**Olivera**	Pacheco	**Quadros**	Rangel		**Tavares**		Valadares		**Xavier**		Zuzarte
**Nazareth**		**Pais**		Raposo	**Saldanha**	Tavora		Valles				
**Neves**		**Paes**		**Rasquinha**	Sales	Teles		**Vaz**				
**Noronha**		Paiva		**Rebello**	Santamaria	Telles		Veiga				
**Nunes**		Palha		**Rego**	Santimano	Texeira		Velho				
		Palmeira		Remedios	Sapeco	Torrado		Verdes				
		Peixote		Reveredo	Sardinha	**Torres**		**Viegas**				
		**Pereira**		Ribeiro	Schunker	Torquato		Vieira				
		Peres		Rocha	Sena	Travasso						
		Picardo		Roche	**Sequeira**	Trinidade						
		Pimenta		**Rodricks**	**Silva**							
		Pinheiro		**Rodrigues**	**Silveira**							
		Pinho		**Rosario**	Simoes							
		**Pinto**			Soares							
		Pires			Suares							
		Po			**Sousa**							
		Prazeres			**Souza**							
See also: List of Portuguese surnames

Portuguese variant	Mangalorean Catholic variant
**Sousa**	Soz
**Coelho**	Coel
**Pinto**	Pint
Sources: A Konkani Grammar (2003)
