= Goan Catholic names and surnames =

Goan Catholic names and surnames encompass the different types of names and surnames used by the Goan Catholics of Goa.

== Names ==
Konkani language variants of most Goan Catholic names are derived from Hebrew, Greek, and Latin names from the Old and New Testament Biblical canons. Nowadays Hindu names like Sandeep, Rahul and Anita, etc. are also given. Portuguese names like António, João, Maria, Ana are also common among Goan Catholics who follow Portuguese culture. British names (e.g. Kevin, Shelley) and other European names (e.g. Benito, Heidi), which have no Konkani variants, are also popular.

Konkani name	Portuguese variant	English variant	Meaning	Sex
Anton	António	Anthony	Flower	Male
Arkanj	Arcanjo	Archangel	Archangel	Female
Bautis	Batista	Baptist	One who baptizes	Male
Lorso	Lourenço	Lawrence	Someone from Laurentum	Male
Jaku	Jacob	James	Heel Grabber	Male
Joki	Joaquim	Joachim	He whom God has set up	Male
Lazar	Lázaro	Lazarus	God has helped	Male
Magdu	Magdalena	Magdalene	Tower	Female
Mori	Maria	Mary	Beloved	Female
Mortin	Martim	Martin	Of or like Mars	
Monik	Mónica	Monica	To advise	Female
Motes	Mateus	Matthew	Gift of God	Male
Mingel	Miguel	Michael	Who is like God?	Male
Monti	Monte	Monte	Mount	Male
Natalin	Natália	Natalia	Birthday	Female
Nikel	Nicolau	Nicholas	Victory of the people	Male
Paulu	Paulo	Paul	Small	Male
Pedru	Pedro	Peter	Stone	Male
Filip	Filipe	Philip	Lover of Horses	Male
Rakel	Raquel	Rachel	Ewe or one with purity	Female
Silest	Silas	Sylvester	Wooded	Male
Salvadu	Salvador	Salvador	Saviour	Male
Saver	Xavier	Xavier	New house	Male
Simanv	Simão	Simon	He (God) has heard	Male
Juanv	João	John	God is gracious	Male
Jebel	Isabel	Elizabeth	My God is my oath	Female
Zuze	José	Joseph	The Lord will add	Male
Source: English-Konkani Dictionary and A Konkani Grammar

== Surnames ==
The Portuguese surnames such as Rodrigues, Fernandes and Carvalho are commonly found among Goan Catholics after centuries of colonial rule in Portuguese Goa and Damaon, and generally follow the second declension. These Portuguese surnames are also observed among the Mangalorean Catholics, the Bombay East Indian Catholics, the Latin Catholics of Malabar, and in other Indo-Portuguese areas such as Damaon and Chaul. Portuguese surnames commonly appear across the world especially in the Lusophone countries of Portugal, Brazil, Angola, Macao, Cape Verde, East Timor, Equatorial Guinea, Guinea-Bissau, São Tomé and Príncipe and Mozambique.

Bold indicates common surnames
Italics indicates uncommon surnames

(Portugal) Goan Surnames with Portuguese Influence
A	B	C	D	E	F	G	H	I	J	K	L	M
Adailton	Bandeira	Cabral	da Costa	Esteves	Faria	Gama	**Henriques**				**Lobo**	Maciel
**Abreu**	**Baptista**	**Caeiro**	da Rosa	Estibeiro	**Fernandes**	**Gomes**					Lowe	**Martin**
Ademir	**Bacardo**	**Caiado**	**da Costa**	Estrocio	**Ferreira**	**Gonsalves**					**Leitao**	Martins
**Afonso**	Barbosa	**Calado**	**de Cunha**		Figueira	Gonçalves					Luis	Medeiros
Agostinho	**Barboz**	**Calisto**	**de Mello**		**Furtado**	**Gracias**						Mendonça
**Aguiar**	**Barcelos**	**Camara**	**de Penha**		**Fonseca**	**Gurjão**						**Mendonca**
**Alberto**	**Barco**	Câmara	**de Souza**		**Ferrao**	Godinho						**Menezes**
**Albuquerque**	**Barnes**	**Campos**	**D'Costa**		Faleiro	**Goes**						**Moraes**
**Alcantara**	**Barreto**	**Cardinho**	**D'Cunha**			**Goveas**						**Machado**
**Aldeia**	**Barros**	**Cardoso**	**D'Oliveira**									**Mendes**
**Alemao**	Batista	**Caridade**	**D'Penha**									**Miranda**
**Alfonso**	**Benedicto**	**Carlos**	**D'Souza**									**Mascarenhas**
**Almeida**	**Benjamin**	**Carmo**	**do Rosário**									Mazarelo
**Alva**	Bennis	**Carneiro**	**Dorado**									Monserrate
Alvares	**Bento**	**Carrasco**	**D'Silva**									Marques
Alves	**Borges**	Carreira	**de Silva**									**Monteiro**
Alves da Silva	**Botelho**	**Carvalho**	**Dourado**									
Alvim	Braga	**Castanha**	**D'Cruz**									
**Amaral**	Branco	**Castelino**	**D'Lima**									
Amarildo	**Brandao**	**Castellino**	D'Mello									
**Ambrose**	Brandão	**Catao**	**Duarte**									
**Amor**	**Brito**	**Cavaco**	**Desa**									
Amorim	**Britto**	**Cereja**	Dias									
**Andrade**	**Bruno**	**Chico**	De Sa									
Antunes	**Buthello**	**Clement**										
**Aranha**	Betancourt	**Coelho**										
Araújo	Biscoito	**Colaço**										
Assunção	Brazão	**Coma**										
**Aurora**	**Barrows**	**Conceicao**										
**Azavedo**		Conceição										
**Azevedo**		**Concessao**										
Ataide		**Corda**										
		**Cordeiro**										
		**Cordo**										
		**Correia**										
		**Corte**										
		Corte-Real										
		**Costa**										
		**Coutinho**										
		**Couto**										
		**Crasta**										
		**Crasto**										
		**Criado**										
		**Cruz**										
		**Cunha**										
N	O	P	Q	R	S	T	U	V	W	X	Y	Z
Nascimento	**Olivera**	Pacheco	**Quadros**	Rangel	**Santos**	**Tavares**		Valadares		**Xavier**		Zuzarte
**Nazareth**	Osorio	**Pais**		Raposo	**Saldanha**	Tavora		Valles				
**Neves**		**Paes**		**Rasquinha**	Sales	Teles		**Vaz**				
**Noronha**		Paiva		**Rebello**	Santamaria	Telles		Veiga				
**Nunes**		Palha		**Rego**	Santimano	Texeira		Velho				
Neritta		Palmeira		Remedios	Sapeco	Torrado		Verdes				
		Peixote		Reveredo	Sardinha	**Torres**		**Viegas**				
		**Pereira**		Ribeiro	Simoes	Torquato		Vieira				
		Peres		Rocha	Sanches	**Travasso**						
		Picardo		Raicar	**Sequeira**	Trinidade						
		Pimenta		**Rodricks**	**Silva**	Travaco						
		Pinheiro		**Rodrigues**	**Silveira**	Tauro						
		Pinho		**Rosario**	Suares							
		**Pinto**			Soares							
		Pires			**Souza**							
		Povo			**Sousa**							
		Prazeres										
See also: List of Portuguese surnames
