= Crasto =

Surname list

Crasto is a surname of Jewish origin, having roots in the Jewish populations of Spain and Portugal. It is a common surname associated with Goan Catholics due to their Portuguese influence. The Mangalorean variant is Castra, and the Spanish variant is Castro.

== Notable people ==
- Roy Pio Crasto, Indian playwright and theatre director
- Tanisha Crasto, Indian professional badminton player

== See also ==
- De Castro family (Sephardi Jewish)
- Goan Catholic names and surnames
- Mangalorean Catholic name
