= Kamara =

Kamara may refer to:

== Places ==
- Lato pros Kamara or simply Kamara, an ancient city on Crete
- Kamara, Estonia, a village
- Kämara, Estonia, a village
- Kamara, Arcadia, Greece, a village
- Kamara, Corfu, Greece, a village in the municipal unit Achilleio
- The Arch of Galerius in Thessaloniki, popularly known as Kamara
- Kamara Chiefdom in Kono District of Sierra Leone
- Ait Kamara, a village in Morocco

== Other ==
- Kamara, a colloquial name for the House of Representatives of the Philippines
- Kamara (given name)
- Kamara (surname)
- Kamara language of Ghana
- Lambri Kamara, a form of a Greek folk dance

== See also ==
- Camara (disambiguation)
- Câmara (disambiguation)
- Kamaras
- Kamares (disambiguation)
