= George Alvarez (disambiguation) =

George Alvarez may refer to:

- George Alvarez, a Cuban-American actor
- George Alvarez (politician), U.S. politician who represents New York's 78th State Assembly district

== See also ==
- George Álvares Maclei, a 1970s Brazilian ambassador to Peru
- Alvarez (disambiguation)
- George (disambiguation)
