= André Lima =

André Lima may refer to:

- André Lima (footballer, born May 1985), Brazilian football striker
- André Lima (environmentalist) (born 1971), Brazilian environmentalist, lawyer and writer
- André Lima (futsal player) (born 1971), Portuguese futsal player and coach
- André Lima (fighter) (born 1999), Brazilian mixed martial artist
- André Lima (footballer, born January 1985), Brazilian football left-back
- André Lima (producer) (aka Andre Luiz Lima Sampaio), Australian film producer, co-producer of Penny Lane Is Dead (2025)
