= Sannesund Bridge =

Sandesund Bridge Sandesundbrua
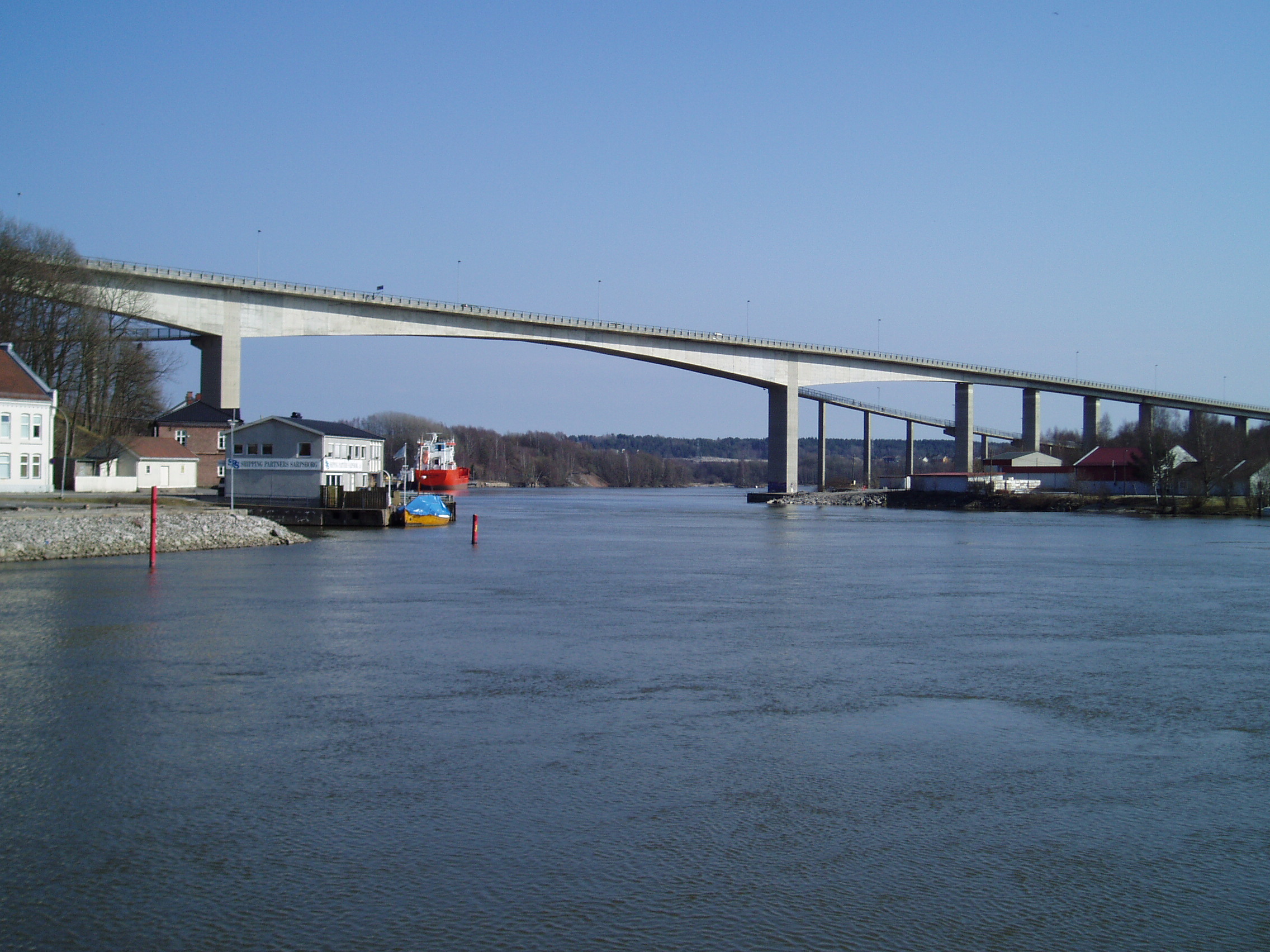
- Coordinates: 59°16′13″N 11°5′45″E
- Carries: Four lanes on European route E6

Characteristics
- Total length: 1528 metres
- Longest span: 139 metres
- Clearance below: 30 metres

History
- Opened: 1978

Sannesund Bridge (Norwegian: Sannesundbrua) is a motorway cantilever bridge that crosses Glomma river in Østfold county, Norway. It extends from Alvim in Sarpsborg to Årum in Fredrikstad.The bridge is 1528 metres long, the longest span is 139 metres, and the maximum clearance is 30 metres. The bridge has 48 spans.

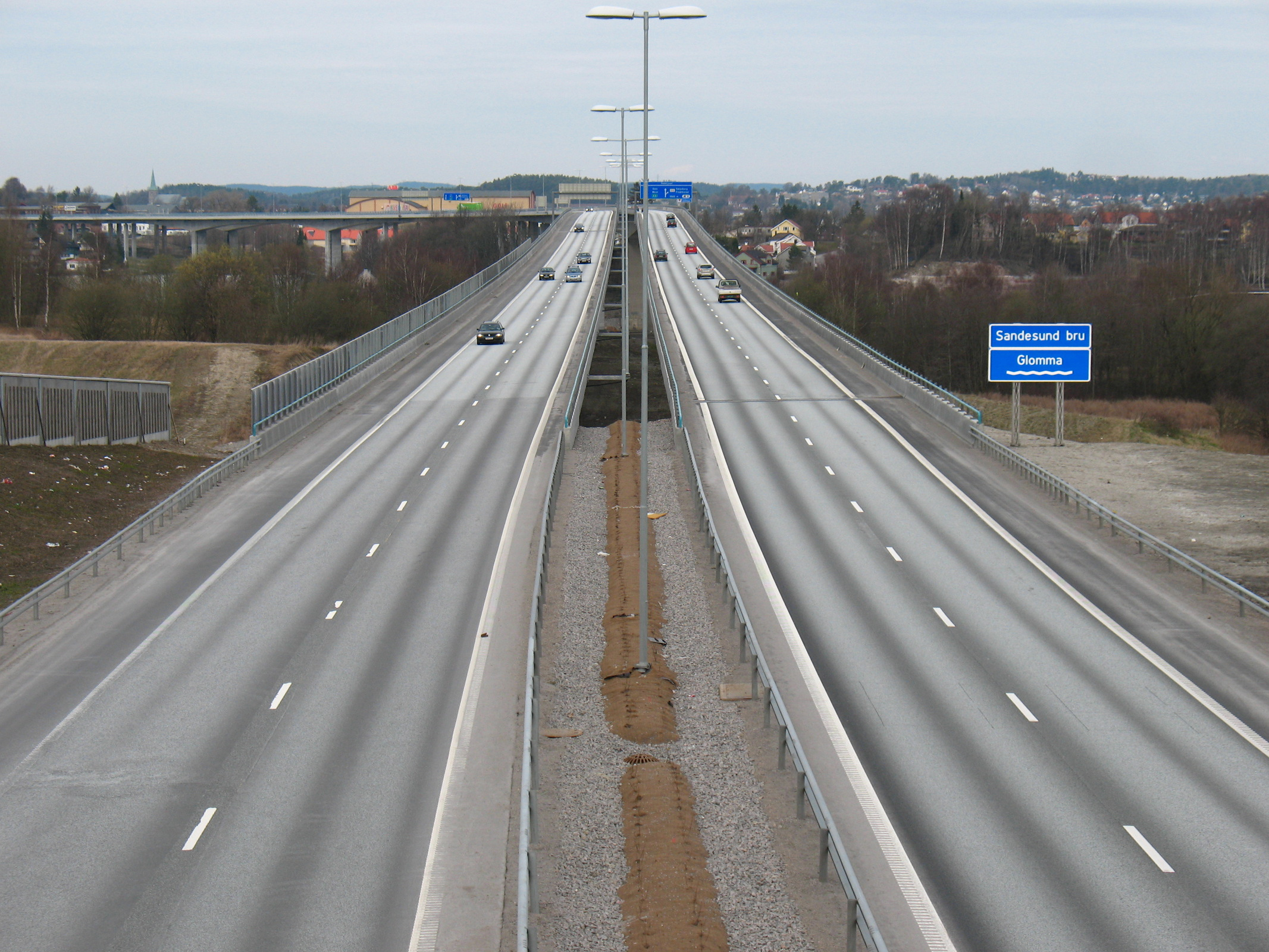
Sannesund Bridge over E6

Sandesund Bridge was opened in 1978. It carries traffic on European route E6. Under the bridge is a narrow pedestrian bridge over Glomma. Sannesund Bridge is actually two bridges travelling in opposite directions. In 2005, a duplicate of the old bridge began construction. The new bridge parallel to the old one was opened in May 2008. The old bridge was subsequently closed for renovation. It opened again in November 2008, creating a four-lane motorway.

== See also ==
- List of bridges in Norway
- List of bridges in Norway by length
- List of bridges by length
