= Kamare =

Kamare may refer to:

- Kamare, Afghanistan, a village in Jaghori District, Afghanistan
- The Girls of Kamare = Les Filles de Kamare, a 1974 French film

== See also ==
- Kamares (disambiguation)
