= Murder of Reyna Marroquín =

Salvadoran woman who was murdered in the United States in 1969

Angélica Marroquín
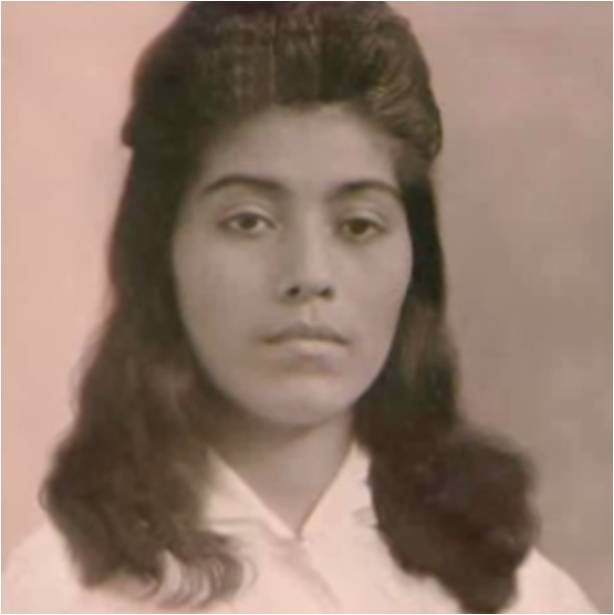
- Born: Reyna Angélica Marroquín; December 2, 1941; El Salvador
- Died: c. January 1969 (aged 27); United States
- Cause of death: Blunt force trauma
- Body discovered: September 2, 1999; Jericho, New York, U.S.
- Citizenship: (El Salvador) Salvadorian
- Occupation: employee of plastics company
- Known for: Murder victim Former unidentified decedent

Reyna Angélica Marroquín (December 2, 1941 – c. January 1969) was a Salvadoran woman who was murdered while pregnant in the United States in 1969. Her murder was not discovered until 1999, 30 years later, when her body was found in the former home of Howard B. Elkins, a prominent businessman who was identified as the prime suspect. Elkins committed suicide by gunshot in the back seat of a Ford Explorer at a friend's home in Boca Raton, Florida, after an interview with the police.

== Crime ==
On September 2, 1999, a 55-gallon drum in the crawl space of a house in Jericho, New York, a Long Island suburb of New York City, was found to contain the mummified remains of a pregnant Hispanic female in her late 20s, between 145 and 152 cm (4'9"–5'0") tall, with unusual dental work. The cause of death was determined to be blunt force trauma to the head. The drum also contained polystyrene pellets, two rings (one inscribed "M.H.R."), a locket inscribed "To Patrice Love Uncle Phil", green dye, a plastic artificial plant stem and an address book.

The drum had been made in 1965 for transporting dye. Markings showed it had been shipped to Melrose Plastics, a Manhattan-based artificial flower company partly owned by Howard B. Elkins, who was the former homeowner of the Jericho house. Elkins sold Melrose Plastics in 1972 and moved to Boca Raton, Florida, with his wife.

Under infrared light, some of the deteriorated address book was legible. A Social Security number written on the first page belonged to Reyna Angélica Marroquín, a 27-year-old immigrant from El Salvador who had worked as a nanny and was employed at the Melrose Plastics factory on East 34th Street.

A phone number in the book belonged to Kathy Andrade, who had been a friend of Marroquín. When contacted, Andrade told police that Marroquín had been having an extramarital affair with Elkins but divulged that she had become afraid of him after telling his wife, Ruth, about the affair and her pregnancy. Andrade went to Marroquín's apartment in New Jersey but found it empty, and Marroquín hadn't been heard from since. A woman fitting Marroquín's description reportedly appeared with a toddler at Melrose Plastics and employees joked that the child's father was, in fact, Elkins.

== Investigation ==
Detectives who interviewed Elkins found him uncooperative. They informed him that they intended to obtain his DNA for comparison with that of the fetus found inside Marroquín. The following day, on September 10, 1999, Elkins was found dead in the back seat of a neighbor's car from a self-inflicted gunshot wound from a 12-gauge Mossberg 500 pump-action shotgun he had purchased at Walmart earlier that day. DNA testing found that Elkins was the father of the fetus.

Investigators believe Elkins either went to Marroquín's apartment or lured her to the factory, ultimately killing her. He then took her body to the house in Jericho, possibly with the intention of dumping her in the ocean from his boat, but after filling the barrel with plastic pellets to ensure it would sink he found it too heavy to move and left it in the crawl space.

Writer Oscar Corral went to San Martín, San Salvador, where Marroquín's 95-year-old mother told him she had dreamed about Marroquín trapped inside a barrel.

== Cultural references ==
The peculiar circumstances of the crime inspired several media treatments of the Marroquín case. The murder provided part of a 2004 episode called "Broken Trust" in the series The New Detectives. The investigation into her murder was covered in "Flower Drum Murder", a 2015 episode of Murder Book, a true crime television series. This case was used as the plot of an episode of NYPD Blue, "Roll Out the Barrel" (April 25, 2000). The case was depicted in "A Voice from Beyond", a 2000 episode of the true crime series Forensic Files Season 5 Episode 4. The murder was dramatized on the Investigation Discovery series Grave Secrets, in Season 2, Episode 1 "Beneath the Stairs" which first aired on November 14, 2017.

== See also ==
- List of solved missing person cases (1950–1969)
- List of unsolved murders (1900–1979)
