= Sá da Bandeira =

Sá da Bandeira may refer to:

- Lubango, Angola, old name Sá da Bandeira until 1975
- Rua de Sá da Bandeira, a place in Santo Ildefonso, Porto, Portugal
- Bernardo de Sá Nogueira de Figueiredo, 1st Marquess of Sá da Bandeira, five times Prime Minister of Portugal

== See also ==
- Bandeira (disambiguation)
- Sá (disambiguation)
