= Luis Álvarez =

Luis Álvarez or Luis Alvarez may refer to:

== Natural science and medicine ==
- Luis Walter Alvarez (1911–1988), American physicist and Nobel Prize winner
- Luis Fernández Álvarez (1853–1937), Spanish-American physician and grandfather of Luis Walter Alvarez
- Luis Álvarez-Gaumé (born 1955), Spanish theoretical physicist specializing in string theory and quantum gravity

== Arts and entertainment ==
=== Writers ===
- Ángel Luis Arambilet Álvarez (born 1957), Dominican writer, artist, filmmaker, and engineer; professionally known as Arambilet
- Luis Álvarez Piñer (1910–1999), Spanish poet and essayist, 1991 winner of Spain's National Poetry Award
- José Luis Álvarez Enparantza (1929–2012), better known by his pseudonym Txillardegi, Basque linguist, politician, and writer
- Luis Álvarez Álvarez (1951–2026), Cuban essayist, poet, and academic

=== Fictional characters ===
- José Luis Álvarez, character played by Puerto Rican actor Luis Roberto Guzmán in the Mexican TV sitcom Lo que la vida me robó

=== Fine arts ===
- José Luis Álvarez (1917–2012), Guatemalan painter
- Luis Álvarez Catalá (1836–1901), Spanish painter
- Luis Álvarez Urquieta (1877–1945), Chilean art historian and collector
- Luis Alvarez Roure (born 1976), Puerto Rican painter

=== Performing arts ===
- Luis Álvarez, vocalist and guitarist with the Mexican urban rock band El Haragán y Compañía
- Luis Álvarez Torres (1913–1995), Peruvian actor

== Government and public service ==
- José Luis Álvarez y Álvarez (1930–2023), Spanish politician, lawyer and mayor of Madrid
- José Luis Álvarez Blanco (born 1949), Spanish politician, member of the People's Party of Galicia and mayor of Pantón
- José Luis Álvarez Martínez (born 1968), Mexican politician
- Luis Alberto Monge Álvarez (1925–2016), president of Costa Rica from 1982 to 1986
- Luis H. Álvarez (1919–2016), Mexican politician and industrialist
- Luis Echeverría Álvarez (1922–2022), president of Mexico from 1970 to 1976

== Military ==
- Luis Álvarez (Argentine military) (1806–1864), Argentine military officer from the Argentine Civil War of the 19th century
- Luis Alvarez (Dominican hero), Dominican hero of War of Independence in the Battle of Azua

== In sports ==
- José Luis Álvarez (born 1969), Spanish fencer
- José Luis Álvarez (born 1968), Spanish taekwondo competitor (late 1980s — early 1990s)
- José Luis Álvarez "Rocky" (born 1954), former Spanish boxer
- Jesús Luis Álvarez de Eulate Güergue (born 1970), commonly known as Koldo, former Andorran soccer player
- Luis Antonio Álvarez Murillo (born 1991), Mexican archer, also known as El Abuelo
- Luis Álvarez (footballer) (born 2003), Honduran footballer
- Luis Álvarez Gómez (born 1959), former Spanish volleyball athlete
- Luis Álvarez de Cervera (born 1947), Spanish equestrian
- Luis Enrique Álvarez (born 1990), Peruvian soccer player
- Luis Hernán Álvarez (1938–1991), Chilean soccer player
- Luis Roberto Álvarez (born 1982), Spanish cyclist
- Luis Manuel Alvarez Saldaña (born 1955), former Spanish basketball player

== Other uses ==
- Luis Álvarez Renta (born 1950), Dominican economist
- José Luis Álvarez Santacristina (born 1954), Basque nationalist, convicted former member of ETA

== See also ==
- Louis Alvarez and Andrew Kolker, American documentary filmmakers
- Alvarez (disambiguation)
- Álvarez (surname)
