= The News (Mexico City) =

Mexican English-language newspaper

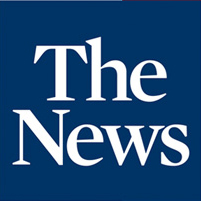
- Type: Daily newspaper
- Format: Tabloid
- Owner: Grupo Mac
- Publisher: Editorial News de México S.A. de C.V.
- Editor: Anuar Maccise
- Founded: 1950
- Language: English
- Headquarters: Montes Urales #425; Colonia Lomas de Chapultepec; Miguel Hidalgo; Mexico City 11003; Mexico
- Circulation: 10,000
- Price: $15 MXP
- Website: www.thenews.mx

The News is a Mexican English-language newspaper that was published in Mexico City five days per week, Monday through Friday. With the exception of the five years between 2002 and 2007, the newspaper has published continuously since its founding on July 5, 1950. It is owned by Mexican media company Grupo Mac.

== History ==
=== The News No. 1: 1950-2002 ===
The News was founded on July 5, 1950, by Romulo O'Farrill, Sr., and owned by Novedades Editores, SA de CV. The News No. 1 had a peak circulation of 17,000.

Romulo O'Farrill Silva (1897-1981), Member of sixth generation O'Farrill name in Mexico. He specialized in auto mechanics and organized an auto assembly plant of a short life. The assembly plant was subsequently sold to the Volkswagen Company. He acquired the Novedades newspaper and a radio station. He received the first grant of television in Mexico and Latin America, Channel 4, starting operations on August 31, 1950. He proposed merging the television channels 2, 4 and 5 for profitability reasons leading to the formation of Tele Sistema Mexicano, with the Azcarraga family and Guillermo González Camarena as partners . He continued as a major partner of that television company.

Due to financial difficulties of the Novedades newspaper, its sister publication The News closed its doors in December 2002 – after 52 years of serving Mexico's English-speaking community. At the time of closure, Novedades had about 800 employees while the much smaller News had less than 50. The News was reportedly profitable even as it was shutting down.

==== Novedades Editores and Novedades ====
Excerpts from Novedades are cited prolifically in John Womak's biography of Emiliano Zapata (Zapata and the Mexican Revolution, Vintage Books 1970) that is widely considered the best biography on the revolutionary hero. The Spanish-language daily created local editions in Acapulco, Cancun and elsewhere.

Novedades was instrumental in the launch the first television network in Mexico, which grew into today's powerful Televisa. Novedades Editores' cash cow was the publication of its comic novellas, which are still popular reading material for Mexico's lower classes. The company also had a license to publish a number of high-end magazines, such as Vogue. Poor management of the magazines resulted in their closure.

In the 1990s, the popularity of Novedades declined as it was widely considered to be an advocate for the Institutional Revolutionary Party (PRI), Mexico's longest ruling political organ until Vicente Fox's presidential victory in 2000. Novedades faced stiff competition from Reforma, which launched in 1993, and specialized daily publications such as El Economista.

=== The News No. 2: 2007-2009 ===
In October 2007, The News began publishing again as a 32-page daily under the ownership of Mr. O'Farrill's son and grandson, Victor Hugo O'Farrill Sr. and Victor Hugo O'Farrill Jr.

That lasted almost two years, until it was sold in May 2009. In explaining why the O'Farrill family sold the paper, Victor Jr., said his family lacked the resources necessary to continue running the newspaper, and that "the costs were very high for such a small newspaper".

It is noteworthy that not only the editorial was managed with a high standard code of ethics, probably unique to Mexico, but also the design grasped three awards of excellence from the SND's 32nd edition.

According to "The News" Director Alejandro Envila Fisher, The News No. 2 had at least 70 contracts with foreign reporters, with little or no advertising revenue.

=== The News No. 3: 2009 to Present ===
In May 2009, Mexican media company Grupo Mac purchased The News; the terms of the purchase did not include purchasing the 70 or so contracts of The News No.2. The 24-page paper is now published Monday through Friday, with a 32-page edition on Friday.

Grupo Mac also owns publications Cambio, Rumbo de Mexico and Estadio; and has a national presence via its eight radio stations and state newspapers published in the states of Hidalgo, Querétaro, Toluca and Morelos.

The News No. 3 got off to a bumpy start. Its new editor, Malcolm Beith, lasted less than two weeks as he was fired after he published unprofessional editorial content (unsigned) about the former owner, Victor Jr., in its June 1, 2009 edition; on-line references

News content today is created with a mix of resources, including The News' own reporters, reporters from Rumbo, Cambio and Estadio and wire services.

The last print editor, Therese Margolis, continues as the online editor with the current version available only online known as Pulse News Mexico.

== Staff Memoirs - 1980s, 1990s ==
The English-language daily's most important role happened before the growth of the Internet. It was the primary source of English-language information (and comics) for ex-pats and travelers. Wire service stories from the U.S. and elsewhere were the primary sources of news for the niche readership.

Roger Toll, the editor during most of the 1980s, obtained the rights to insert The New York Times Week in Review, which was very popular with readers. From its beginnings in the 1950s through the late 1980s, domestic information ranged from national business stories to garden parties hosted by members of the foreign community. Roger Toll also created a weekly supplement called Encuentros, which provided cultural information. The daily newspaper occasionally carried a staff written story from outside the nation's capital. Stringers contributed local stories about ex-pats and community activities from Acapulco, San Miguel del Allende, Chapala and elsewhere. Those local stories appeared in the weekly travel supplement called Vistas, which was edited for years by the late Joe Nash and Sally Sue Hulse.

Some stories gained more attention. For example, as the air quality declined in Mexico City, The News ran more stories about the smog's impact on the population. This type of reporting, as well as the occasional business piece, earned some respect for the tabloid. The large diplomatic corp in Mexico City read the English-language daily carefully and many embassies used clippings in their reports back to their respective home countries.

Like its Spanish-language sister paper (and many dailies in the nation's capital), The News tended to toe the official government line in its editorial policy, specifically in its national news coverage. Hoping to change that trend, then-editor Roger Toll hired Pete Hamill in 1986 to take over The News. Hamill, a former New York Post columnist, was fired after six months on the job for covering a student protest on Mexico City's main university, the UNAM.

A few staff members broke away in the late 1980s and started The Mexico Journal, which was published by the Spanish-language daily newspaper La Jornada. The Mexico Journal had great content but it could not generate enough advertising to stay afloat. It closed, leaving The News as the only domestic English-language news source.

Following Pete Hamill's departure, Novedades promoted business columnist Roberto Mena to take over the daily. Mena stepped down as editor but continued to write his business column. Patricia Nelson, who ran the paper's finance section, took over as editor. (During particular hectic periods of the late 1980s and 1990s, Nelson acted as interim editor three times while continuing to write her three weekly finance columns). Nelson, Mena and longtime yes-man Dan Dial, who eventually climbed into the editor's chair, were among only a few who affixed themselves to The News for any length of time.

== Staff Memoirs - The News in the Cold War ==
For most of its early life, The News was in the center of the three-way struggle to control information going to the expatriate and diplomatic communities in Mexico City, once described as the "Berlin of the West."

While Romulo O'Farrill, Jr., drove up to the Novedades-The News offices his chauffeur-driven Lamborghini in the mid-1970s, The News journalists—many of them barely surviving on less than $250 a month—were often easy prey of intelligence agencies on both sides of the conflict. The paper's administration toed the Washington and Institutional Revolutionary Party (PRI) lines, not only for financial and political advantage in the Mexican market; but for self-preservation in a media market "pyramid" that was somehow split Left on the bottom and Right on the top—with the Right becoming an ever-smaller, threatened minority. It was a time to win "the hearts and minds" of young ex-pat journalists, so that they, knowingly or not, could convey the "party line." Easy no-payback loans were made to pro-U.S. policy newspapers; while others, particularly in the political opposition or of Leftist bent, struggled to get enough paper from the Mexican government to print. The Soviets, meanwhile, offered the coin of their realm—a progressive ideology that bore promise of a better future—perfect for young, idealistic journalists. The Soviets, and to a certain extent the Cubans, trusted no one, offering support not as a prelude but, rather, as a postscript. In other words, they basically said: "Do something for us, and then we'll see what we can do for you." Their approach, however, caused—directly and indirectly—the failure and destruction of many friendly journalists and publications. In the political arena, this approach, along with deep infiltration by Mexican military intelligence, contributed to the disappearance or destruction of many in Leftist political groups.

Throughout The News history, the O'Farrill family always maintained ties with Washington, along with bitter memories of its expropriated financial and property loses in the Cuban Revolution. The elder O'Farrill, Don Romulo, although rich and powerful, retained a sense of humility, humanity, and grace throughout his long life. He often greeted Novedades and The News employees by name as he entered the Balderas building's main elevator. And although apparently somewhat embittered, he seldom demonstrated it in public, preferring instead to, at least partially, identify with the poor souls around him. His eldest living son, Pepe Antonio, on the other hand, was often aloof and arrogant, with little regard for the workers in his publishing empire. And although The News was an English-language newspaper, it was not out of the line of fire, as it was fertile recruitment ground for intelligence assets. The Soviets and Cubans were somewhat reserved in their recruitment of English-speaking journalists in Mexico, fearing that they could be Western agents. The Central Intelligence Agency (CIA), however, was much more sophisticated and subtle, having developed their Latin American media campaign from at least the early 1950s, under the watchful eye of "Daniel James & Co."

James, a CIA fixture in Mexico City society, had a phony public relations firm that was in constant contact with The News and some of its high-ranking editors. He also once had his offices at the Maria Isabel Hotel next door to the U.S. Embassy. Earlier in his career, he was, in part, responsible for the propaganda that led to the CIA invasion of Guatemala in 1954. Part of his job in Mexico was to recruit U.S. and foreign journalists—not necessarily as agents but, rather, as assets to be called upon when U.S. policy dictated.

First, there would be the invitations to parties, shows, lunches and dinners, etc. Then, over time, the journalist would be drawn into the web, usually through offers of scholarships, phony part-time jobs, travel and, for many—including a few former journalists from The News, positions within Mexican or U.S. media, with an open road to promotion and recognition. If journalists were seen as not cooperating, or were not in support of the "party line," their careers and personal lives were often neutralized or obliterated by well-planted rumors and lies directed at the journalist's credibility and morality. Some managed to survive. Most didn't.

The Cubans and Russians, meanwhile, used what they considered to be their trump card...their ideology. So The News in the 70s and 80s maintained a delicate balance between the idealists on one side, some courted by the Russians and Cubans, among others; and the "survivalists," represented by those who were controlled either by fear of losing their jobs because they violated censorship, or by their ambitions fueled by CIA promises of power and "friendship." The greatest struggle, however, was to keep The News a Mexican newspaper, and not as an extension of the U.S. Embassy press office, even if the highest levels of management weren't bothered by the prospect.

They knew who were recruited by the CIA, and shared some of that information with independent journalists, if it benefited their political objectives at the time. Soviet agents, meanwhile, had been employed by Novedades since the 1940s, quietly monitoring activities and recruiting assets, usually among lower-echelon employees. Most CIA recruits were in management, as they were able to hire and fire, and they looked good at cocktail parties. (There were some exceptions, of course). Some recruits went on to U.S. publications and wire services—especially those serving a Hispanic-dominated community, like in Miami or along the U.S.-Mexican border.

== Staff Memoirs - Fidel, Che, and Raúl...at The News ==
In the 1970s, Jaime Plenn, then managing editor, recalled the days in the mid-1950s when Fidel Castro and his brother Raúl would come to The News offices almost every day before their return of Cuba to check news wires. During their exile in Mexico, the brothers were known to have worked a couple of blocks away on Avenida Juarez, reportedly taking pictures of tourists to make extra money. When the sun went down, however, their attention returned to politics and news. Plenn said they were "very nice boys," noting that after a while, a woman and another young man would sometimes join the brothers. Although Plenn never identified the pair, he believed the young man to have been Che Guevara and his first wife. "They were all very intense," he recalled,"Very serious, but also very courteous and warm.... They would read every bit of news about Cuba and Latin America.... Of course they always asked me for permission to look at the wires, and of course I always gave it to them."

== Staff Memoirs - Political Stance ==
There were moments when the newspaper opened up, particularly when Mexico was negotiating the North American Free Trade Agreement (NAFTA) with the United States and Canada. In the early 1990s, with the appointment of a new general manager at Novedades Editores (and following criticism of the English-language paper's coverage), another editor was hired. Michael J. Zamba (a Washington, D.C., journalist and author of two published books on Mexico) joined the organization in 1990 and immediately made changes to the paper's design and staff. He also oversaw marketing of the daily. He was fired shortly after he took over as editor.(Correction: It was Nelson who instituted classes for the staff.)

Talented writers—such as Elizabeth Malkin, Eduardo Garcia, Peter Raeside, Laurence Iliff and others, as well as then first-time writers like David Luhnow—were brought into the newspaper. More analytical pieces on Mexico were published and the writers were praised for their work. Business coverage was increased. Circulation grew.

Nonetheless, Zamba left in frustration in 1992. Novedades Editores couldn't live up to its promises. Zamba started an English-language fortnightly magazine called Mexico Insight, which circulated 20,000 copies. The magazine lasted for two years, until the transition from President Salinas to President Zedillo was followed by a major devaluation. In 2000, he launched Express, a daily newspaper of The Dallas Morning News that circulated some 60,000 copies in six Mexican cities. That daily closed in 2002 as a result of the economic impact of Sept. 11, 2001.

Long-time employee Dial, formerly of Oakland, Calif., took over as the editor of The News in 1993. Dan had worked his way up in the organization and was trusted by the owner. Novedades Editores fired the General Manager of the organization as the owners took more control of the Noveades Editores' operations. Dial kept the peace, ensured the newspaper was published on time and avoided tough stories.

During the historic 2000 elections, the publisher banned the publication of photographs of Vicente Fox, the PAN presidential candidate who was contesting the PRI's long-standing dominance. Articles on homosexuality, abortion and AIDS were also prohibited. An assistant managing editor, Daniel C Schechter (not to be confused with media writer and filmmaker Danny Schechter) published a front-page article from the New York Times, authored by Sam Dillon, on gay rights in Guadalajara. He was fired for the decision to publish this article, but it was a conscious move on his part to break from the prohibition on certain content.

== Launching pad for correspondents ==
In spite of its censorship, The News was a unique springboard for budding foreign correspondents, a way to immerse in foreign news coverage. The newspaper helped to nurture some well-known correspondents, including The Miami Herald reporter Alfonso Chardy — who was key to breaking the Iran-Contra scandal in the 1980s — was another News alum. Other major journalists currently working in international correspondence, including Peter Raeside, also passed through the doors of The News early in their careers. But the paper also harbored its share of journalistic drifters and misfits who used it as little more than financing for their adventures in Mexico.

Another paper tries it: The Herald Mexico, published by El Universal circulated in Mexico City. It was published through a joint-venture between The Miami Herald and El Universal. It was a much smaller publication than The News and closed on May 31, 2007.

== See also ==
- List of newspapers in Mexico
