= Carreira (surname) =

Carreira is a Portuguese surname. Notable people with the surname include:

== Music ==
- António Carreira (1520/30-1597), Portuguese composer and organist of the Renaissance
- David Carreira (born 1991), French-born Portuguese pop, dance, hip hop and R&B singer, son of singer Tony Carreira
- Mickael Carreira (born 1986), Portuguese pop singer, son of singer Tony Carreira
- Tony Carreira (born 1963), Portuguese musician, singer

== Sports ==
- Diego Alves Carreira (born 1985), Brazilian football goalkeeper
- Diogo Carreira (born 1978), Portuguese basketball player
- Hugo Miguel Martins Carreira (born 1979), Portuguese footballer
- Luis Carreira (1976–2012), Portuguese motorcycle road racer
- Paulo Jorge Carreira Nunes (born 1970), Portuguese footballer
- Christina Carreira (born 2000), Canadian-born American ice dancer

== Others ==
- Erick M. Carreira (born 1963), Cuban-born organic chemist
- Henrique Medina Carreira (born 1931), Portuguese jurist, minister
- Iko Carreira, Angolan army general and minister
- Joaquim Justino Carreira (1950–2013), Portuguese-born Brazilian Roman Catholic bishop

== See also ==
- Carreira (disambiguation)
