= Alfonso Chardy =

American journalist (1951 to 2024

Alfonso Nieto Chardi (April 14, 1951, Mexico City – April 9, 2024) was an American journalist. He won a Pulitzer Prize.

He studied at Indiana University Bloomington. He worked for The News in Mexico City, for The Associated Press in 1974, and for United Press International. In 1980 he was hired by The Miami Herald.

In 1987, he wrote articles about the Iran Contra scandal.

== Awards ==
In 1986, as Washington Bureau correspondent for Miami Herald, he was awarded a gold medal by the Maria Moors Cabot Prize committee.

He was on the team at the Miami Herald that won the 1993 Pulitzer Prize for public service for coverage of Hurricane Andrew; the 1999 Pulitzer Prize for investigative reporting, for coverage of voter fraud in a mayoral election, and the 2001 Pulitzer Prize for breaking news for articles about Elian Gonzalez,

- 2006: Society of Professional Journalists' Sunshine State Award in category International/War/National Security Reporting, jointly with Oscar J. Corral, for interview with Luis Posada Carriles.
