= De Amorim =

Amorim is a Portuguese surname. People with that name include:

- Diogo Pacheco de Amorim (born 1949), Portuguese politician
- Francisco Gomes de Amorim (1827–1891), Portuguese poet and dramatist
- Mathias De Amorim (born 2004), French footballer
- William de Amorim (born 1991), Brazilian footballer

== See also ==
- Amorim
