= Mendonsa =

Mendonsa is a surname. Notable people with the surname include:

- Alyssa Mendonsa (born c. 1990), Indian singer
- Loy Mendonsa, Indian musician
- Warren Mendonsa (born 1979), Indian musician behind Blackstratblues

== See also ==
- Mendonça
