= Andrade (disambiguation) =

Andrade is a Portuguese and Spanish (Galician) surname.

== People ==
- Adolfo Andrade (1950–2025), Colombian footballer
- Andrade "El Idolo" (born 1989), Mexican professional wrestler also known as Andrade "Cien" Almas and La Sombra
- Auguste Andrade (1793–1843), French composer
- Edward Andrade (1887–1971), English physicist, writer, and poet
- Elinton Andrade (born 1979), Brazilian-born Portuguese footballer
- Francisco Franco Bahamonde (1892–1975), pseudonym of screenwriter Jaime de Andrade
- Isaac Andrade (1937–2018), Peruvian footballer
- José Leandro Andrade (1901–1957), Uruguayan footballer
- Kathy Andrade (1932–2021), Salvadoran-American union activist
- Marcelo Costa de Andrade (born 1967), Brazilian serial killer
- Marcia Andrade Braga, Brazilian military officer and peacekeeper
- Nuestras Hijas de Regreso a Casa, founded in honor of kidnapping victim Lilia Alejandra Garcia Andrade
- Oswald de Andrade (1890–1954), Brazilian poet and polemicist
- Andrade, Lady of Goddess Keep, a character in Melanie Rawn's novels

Andrade may also refer to:

== Places ==
- Andrade, California

== See also ==
- Freire de Andrade (disambiguation)
