= Bandeira =

Bandeira, a Portuguese-language word for flag, may refer to:

== People ==
- Bandeira (surname)

== Places ==
- Bandeira, Minas Gerais, Brazil, a municipality
- Bandeira do Sul, Minas Gerais, Brazil
- Bandeira River (Chopim River tributary), Brazil
- Bandeira River (Piquiri River tributary), Brazil
- Pico da Bandeira, the third highest mountain in Brazil
- Bandeira Waterfall, East Timor

== See also ==
- Bandeirantes (disambiguation)
- Bandeiras (Madalena), a civil parish in the Azores
- Banderas (disambiguation)
