= Amorim =

Amorim is a Portuguese and Sephardic surname. A habitational name from any of the various places named Amorim, originally (villa) Amorin, from the name of the estate owner.

During the forced baptisms and surname adoptions in Portugal during the Inquisition, the Portuguese surname 'Amorim' could have been translated from 'almorim' or 'almorin' due to the moorish invasion into Portugal. Amorim is a well known Sephardic Portuguese surname.

There is a Hispanicized version, Amorín.

Notable people with the surname include:

== Sport ==
- Alex Amorim (born 2005), Brazilian footballer
- Ana Amorim (born 1983), Brazilian handball player, played at the 2004 Olympics
- Bruno Amorim (sailor) (born 1975), Brazilian sailor
- Bruno Amorim (footballer) (born 1998), Portuguese footballer, plays for Sanjoanense
- Eduarda Amorim, (born 1986), Brazilian handball player, 2014 player of year
- Júnior Amorim (born 1972), Brazilian football player and coach, manages Cametá
- Ni Amorim (Nuno Amorim, born 1962), Portuguese racing car driver
- Patrícia Amorim (born 1969), Brazilian swimmer
- Ruben Amorim (born 1985), Portuguese footballer and manager

== Other fields ==
- Américo Amorim (1934–2017), Portuguese businessman
- Celso Amorim (born 1942), Brazilian diplomat and politician
- Enrique Amorim (1900–1960), Uruguayan novelist and writer
- José Amorín Batlle (born 1954), Uruguayan lawyer and politician
- Rosa Amorim (born 1996), Brazilian politician

== See also ==
- De Amorim, Portuguese surname
- Amorim, Póvoa de Varzim, a suburb in Portugal
- Corticeira Amorim, a Portuguese cork company
