= Agostinho =

Agostinho is a Portuguese language noun meaning Augustine. It may be used as a given name or a surname. Notable people with the name include:

Given name

- Agostinho (footballer) (born 1975), Portuguese footballer, full name Joaquim Agostinho da Silva Ribeiro
- Agostinho (footballer, born 1997), Agostinho da Silva Araujo, East Timorese football defender
- Agostinho da Silva (1906–1994), Portuguese philosopher, essayist, and writer
- Agostinho Neto (1922–1979), first President of Angola
- Agostinho Patrus (born 1971), Brazilian politician
- Fernando Agostinho da Costa (born 1981), known as "Xara", Angolan footballer
- José Agostinho de Macedo (1761–1831), Portuguese poet and prose writer
- Renato Agostinho de Oliveira Júnior (born 1981), Brazilian footballer

Surname

- Artur Agostinho (1920–2011), Portuguese journalist
- Gílson Domingos Rezende Agostinho (born 1977), known as "Gilsinho", Brazilian footballer
- Joaquim Agostinho (1942–1984), Portuguese professional bicycle racer
- José Maria de Santo Agostinho (1889–1912), Brazilian mystic
- Pedro Agostinho (born 1965), Portuguese athlete who participated in the 1988 and 1992 Summer Olympics
- Rodrigo Agostinho (1977), Brazilian politician

== See also ==
- Cabo de Santo Agostinho, "Cape of Saint Augustine", 35 km south of Recife, Pernambuco, Brazil
- Troféu Joaquim Agostinho, a road bicycle racing stage race held annually in the Torres Vedras, Portugal
- Santo Agostinho River, located in Espírito Santo, Brazil
