= Oscar J. Corral =

Cuban-American journalist and filmmaker

Oscar Jose Corral (born 16 August 1974) is a Cuban-American journalist and filmmaker. In 2012, Corral directed and produced a documentary film about author Tom Wolfe, entitled Tom Wolfe Gets Back to Blood, which enjoyed a national run on PBS and was screened in more than 40 independent theaters around the country. The film is about how Wolfe researched his novel Back to Blood in South Florida.

Through his own media production company, Explica Media Solutions, Corral has partnered with, and worked for, many news organizations, including the Miami Herald, which premiered an 18-part video series about invasive Burmese pythons in 2014. That series, later rebranded Exotic Invaders: Pythons in the Everglades, premiered on PBS nationally in 2015 and is available on Netflix. The film won an Emmy award for environmental films. Corral also completed a documentary film about undocumented child immigrants, The Crossfire Kids, in 2014. That film aired on South Florida PBS affiliate WPBT2 and received an Emmy nomination.

Corral is a former Miami Herald journalist who triggered a controversy among Cuban exiles in Miami with his reporting about government funding for Radio and TV Marti and other U.S. government programs to promote democracy in Cuba. His controversial stories have been the subject of several studies and analyses, most recently by Columbia University, which used them as a basis for an ethical case study.

Corral also played major roles in the coverage of other big stories in Miami, including the fall of Miami Commissioner Arthur Teele, the case of Cuban exile militant Luis Posada Carriles, and multiple state and national political campaigns. His short-lived blog, Miami's Cuban Connection, enjoyed a burst of popularity in 2006 before fading into internet limbo, where it lives on in the Miami Herald's archives. It has not been updated for several years.

== Biography ==
=== Early life and education ===
Corral is the 2nd child of Oscar Jose Corral-Corral and Maria Caridad Parlade y Fernandez de Castro, Cuban exiles. He graduated in 1992 from Belen Jesuit Preparatory School in Miami.

Corral later graduated from the University of Florida's journalism program, and won first place in the Hearst National Writing Awards in 1998 with an article about the budding medical marijuana scene in San Francisco that year.

After winning the Hearst award, the Chicago Tribune recruited Corral for an internship. While at the Tribune, Corral researched and broke several stories, including an in-depth scoop on a legal fight over the estate of Jack Kerouac.

After completing his master's degree in International Relations at Florida International University, Corral moved to New York City to work for Newsday covering crime.

=== Journalism career ===
While at Newsday, Corral worked on several high-profile stories, including the case of Reyna Angelica Marroquin, a Salvadoran immigrant to New York who disappeared in 1969, and whose mummified body was discovered inside a metal drum below a Long Island mansion 30 years later. Corral reported on the role of science and technology in breaking the case, drawing the interest of television producers looking to recreate true-crime stories on television. Corral located the woman's family in El Salvador and was the first to break the news to them of her death. The story made national headlines and Forensic Files made a documentary on the case, including an interview with Corral. The case was also featured on 48 Hours, and became the backdrop for an episode of Law & Order.

Corral returned to his native Miami in 2001, shortly before the September 11 attacks, and was subsequently assigned to the story's Florida angle by his new employer, The Miami Herald. Corral and a team of other journalists won a Green Eyeshade Award from the Society of Professional Journalists for their coverage of the perpetrators' movements in Florida in the weeks leading up to the attacks.

His first beat was Miami City Hall, covering the mayoral campaign immediately following the Elian Gonzalez incident. Incumbent Joe Carollo was defeated by Manny Diaz, a local lawyer who had represented Gonzalez's Miami relatives. Corral's coverage of City Hall culminated with a series of investigative articles about Miami Commissioner Arthur Teele, who was eventually indicted on federal and state corruption charges and shot himself to death in the lobby of the Miami Herald building. Corral appears in Miami Noir, a documentary on Teele's rise and fall.

Corral covered the 2003-2004 presidential primary of Connecticut Senator Joseph Lieberman, following him for several months as he campaigned in New Hampshire and other early-voting states. He also covered the unsuccessful gubernatorial campaign of former U.S. Attorney General Janet Reno, and Rudy Giuliani's unsuccessful presidential campaign in Florida in 2008.

In 2005, Corral and several colleagues drove an RV packed with supplies to Biloxi, and then on to New Orleans in the immediate aftermath of Hurricane Katrina. Corral spent a week living in the severely damaged Radisson hotel in New Orleans with other journalists, covering the unrest and chaos in the aftermath of the hurricane.

Corral was later asked to cover the contentious politics of Cuban exiles, and launched a blog called Miami's Cuban Connection, which grew steadily in popularity until 2007, when he moved on to another beat. He covered the story of Luis Posada Carriles, a Cuban exile militant accused of masterminding the bombing of a Cuban passenger jet in 1976, which killed 74 people. Posada evaded Homeland Security to enter Miami in 2005, where Corral and his colleague Alfonso Chardy were the first journalists to interview Posada in the United States. Posada was arrested by federal authorities soon after, and remains in federal detention. Corral and Chardy were awarded first place in the Sunshine State awards for their reporting on the Posada story, and were nominated by the Miami Herald for a Pulitzer Prize that year.

=== Radio Marti investigation ===
In September 2006, Corral published what would become the most controversial investigative article of his career. It unleashed a firestorm in the Cuban exile community and turned Corral into a target for death threats, slander and undaunted libel. According to Columbia University Professor Kirsten Lundberg, who turned the case into a 30-page journalism ethics case study, the event can be used to discuss strategic management at both an editorial and ownership level. "Students can gain understanding of the relationship between newspaper owners, their publishers and their editors. The case also raises for discussion ethnic issues in the newsroom. How should managers approach ethnic diversity in a newsroom if that becomes a tripwire for anger and hostility."

According to Lundberg

"On September 8, 2006, the Miami Herald ran a Page One story titled “10 Miami journalists take U.S. pay.” The story by Oscar Corral reported that Miami-area journalists had accepted money from Radio/TV Martí, a US government-run broadcast targeted at the communist nation of Cuba. Three of the 11 journalists named in the story worked for El Nuevo Herald, a Spanish-language newspaper also owned by the Miami Herald Publishing Company. Corral wrote that the three had been fired for violating conflict of interest rules.

"The story, and the disciplinary action, unleashed a firestorm of protest from Cuban-Americans and others in greater Miami. Over a thousand readers canceled their subscriptions. The accused at Nuevo Herald protested that they had permission from a previous editor to work at Radio Martí. Those accused who did not work for Nuevo Herald wondered why the Miami Herald story had cast as reprehensible a practice which they regarded as professionally unremarkable, and also a moral duty. Charges of racism and anti-Cuban prejudice raced through the Cuban-American community and fetched headlines elsewhere.

"Miami Herald publisher Jesús Díaz, Jr., held ultimate responsibility for both newspapers. He had made the decision to fire the three Nuevo Herald reporters. As criticism mounted, he came in for scathing critique within both the Nuevo Herald and—to the surprise of some—the Miami Herald newsrooms. On September 15, nationally recognized Miami Herald columnist Carl Hiaasen submitted for publication a column about the Radio Martí incident in which, Díaz felt, Hiaasen made light of the situation. Fearing more backlash, Díaz spiked the column. Hiaasen protested, and threatened to resign.

"The McClatchy Company had bought the Knight-Ridder newspaper chain, with its crown jewel, the Miami Herald, just three months earlier. Headquartered in Sacramento, California, McClatchy rarely interfered in the running of its properties. But when news of the Hiaasen stand-off reached Vice President for News Howard Weaver, he intervened. Hiaasen’s column, he ruled, would run—and it appeared in its regularly scheduled slot on September 17."

In the days following the controversy, Corral received multiple death threats on himself and his family. The Miami Herald reportedly moved Corral and his family into a secure location with 24-hour security for two months.

Corral remained silent during most of the controversy, and focused instead on completing a multi-part investigative series. Eventually, he granted an interview to fellow Miami journalist Rebecca Wakefield, a former New Times writer who was working for the SunPost. The article, titled "I Am Not A Communist", explains: "Oscar Corral dreamed of one day being hired by the Miami Herald. He never imagined it would come with an existential crisis." Instead of lashing out at critics, Corral struck a humble tone, saying that his deep community roots in Miami made him sensitive to the Cuban exile community's passionate outlook on Cuba. "Corral, 32, is soft-spoken, thoughtful and earnest to a fault. He still looks like a Catholic school boy and has an almost ecclesiastical approach to journalism," Wakefield wrote. In the interview, Corral revealed that The Miami Herald had moved him and his family out of his house as a precaution following a series of death threats.

Corral left the Miami Herald in 2008 to launch a multimedia production company.
