= Sá (disambiguation) =

Sá may refer to:

- Sá, surname
- de Sá, surname
- D'Sá, surname

== Places ==
- Sá (pt) - freguesia in the concelho of Arcos de Valdevez, Portugal
- Sá (pt) - freguesia in the concelho of Monção, Portugal
- Sá (pt) - freguesia in the concelho of Ponte de Lima, Portugal
- Sá - place in Tendais, Cinfães Municipality
- Sá (pt) - place in the concelho of Valpaços, Portugal
- Sá da Bandeira (disambiguation), old name of Lubango, Angola
