= Brandão =

Brandão (Portuguese pronunciation: [bɾɐ̃ˈdɐ̃w]), in English sometimes Brandao (without the obligatory tilde), is a Portuguese language surname or given name and a place name.

It may refer to:

== Places ==
- Bueno Brandão, Brazil
- Caldas Brandão, Brazil
- Milton Brandão, Brazil
- Paços de Brandão, Portugal
- Porto Brandão, Portugal

== People ==
- Antonio Bezerra Brandão, Brazilian footballer
- Avelar Brandão Vilela (1912–1986), Brazilian Cardinal of the Roman Catholic Church
- Brandão (footballer, born 1941), José Cândido de Campos, Brazilian footballer
- Carlos Brandão (born 1958), Brazilian politician
- Carlos Miguel Brandão Fernandes (born 1978), Portuguese footballer
- Celso Brandão (born 1951), Brazilian photographer
- Davi Brandão (born 1997), Brazilian politician
- Diego Brandão, Brazilian mixed martial artist
- Evaeverson Lemos da Silva (born 1980), known as "Brandão", Brazilian footballer
- Evandro Brandão, a Portuguese footballer
- Fernanda Brandão, a Brazilian singer and dancer
- Fiama Hasse Pais Brandão, Portuguese poet, dramatist, translator and essayist
- Gonçalo Brandão, Portuguese footballer
- Ignácio de Loyola Brandão (born 1936), Brazilian writer
- João Brandão (born 1982), Portuguese football manager
- José Augusto Brandão, Brazilian footballer
- Kimberly Brandão, Portuguese footballer
- Leci Brandão (born 1944), Brazilian singer and composer
- Lúcia Maria Brandão Freitas Lobato, short Lúcia Lobato (born 1965), East Timorese politician
- Osvaldo Brandão, Brazilian football coach
- Pedro Miguel Castro Brandão Costa, Portuguese footballer
- Raul Brandão (1867–1930), Portuguese writer, journalist and military officer
- Silviano Brandão, Brazilian politician
- Idebrando Dalsoto, Brazilian footballer known as Brandão
