= Camara =

Camara may refer to:

- Camara (surname)
- Camara (social enterprise), an Irish social enterprise and charity
- Lato pros Kamara or Camara, an ancient city on Crete
- Camara, an early clan of Mandinka people in West Africa

== See also ==
- Kamara (disambiguation)
- Câmara (disambiguation)
- Camera (disambiguation)
- Camaro
