= Freire de Andrade =

Freire de Andrade may refer to:

- Bernardim Freire de Andrade (1759–1809), Portuguese Army general officer who was lynched by his own troops during the Peninsular War
- Gomes Freire de Andrade, Portuguese cavalry captain and one of the Forty Conspirators
- Gomes Freire de Andrade (1757–1817), Portuguese general officer who served in the Portuguese Legion (Legião Portuguesa) in Russia
- Manuel Freire de Andrade (c. 1767–1834), Spanish cavalry officer and general during the Peninsular War
- Rui Freire de Andrade (c. 1590s – December 1632), Portuguese soldier involved in the Portuguese–Safavid War during the 1620s

== See also ==
- Freire
- Andrade (disambiguation)
