= André Lima (environmentalist) =

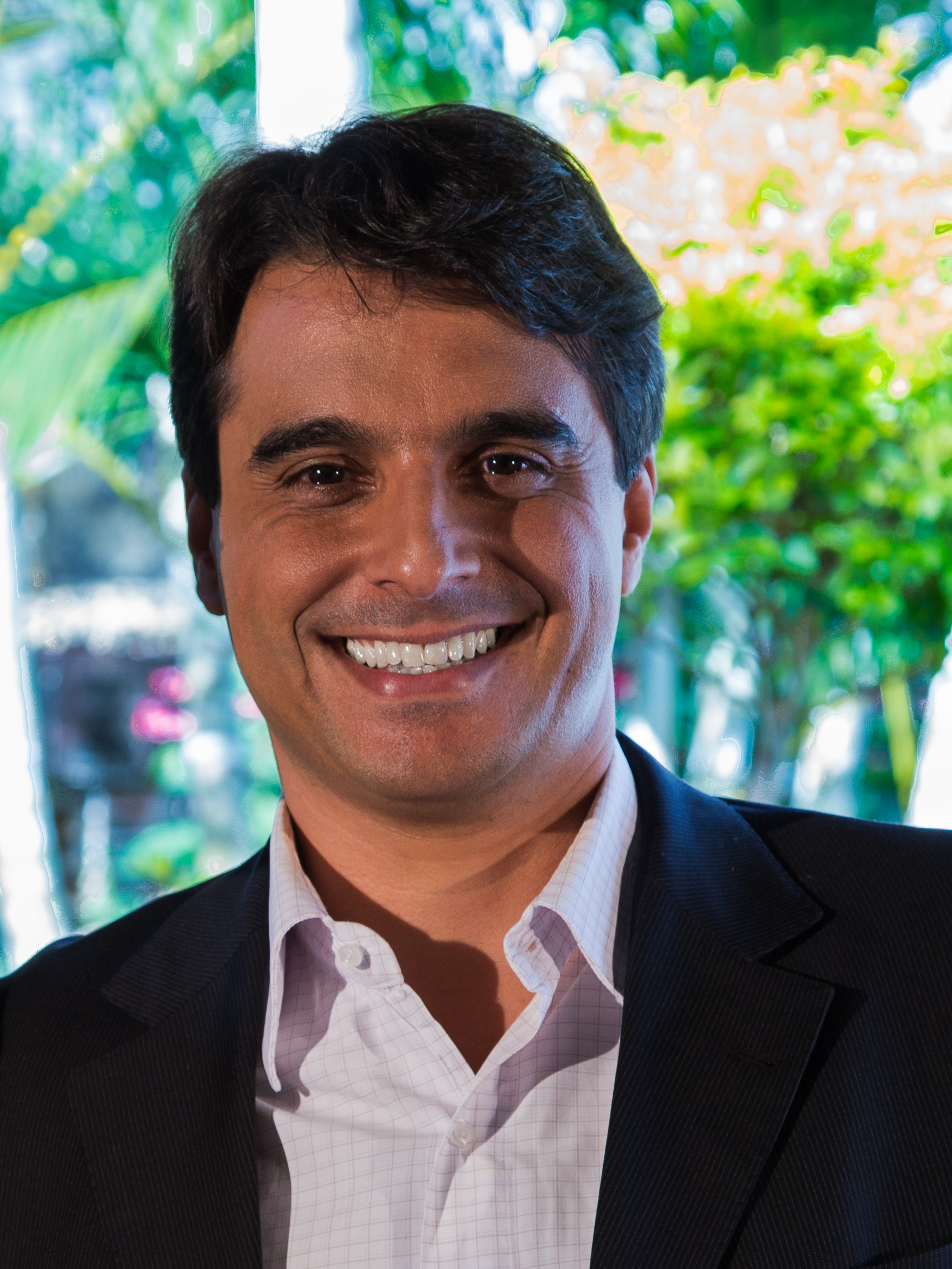
- Born: December 9, 1971 (age 53); Araraquara, Brazil
- Education: Lawyer
- Occupation: Environmentalist
- Employer: Environmental Research Institute of the Amazon
- Known for: Founder of SOS Mata Atlântica Foundation and of the Democracy and Sustainability Institute.

André Rodolfo de Lima, known as Andre Lima (born December 9, 1971), is a Brazilian activist, lawyer and writer who works on issues of sustainable development, biodiversity protection and sustainable use of forests, and the right of peoples and populations indigenous and traditional in the Brazilian scenario.

== Early life and career ==
Born in Araraquara, in the state of São Paulo, Andre Lima moved to São Paulo in early childhood, and lived there until 1999. During this period, Andre Lima graduated in law from the University of São Paulo (USP) in 1994, during which interned in the Public Ministry of Environment Capital of São Paulo and the Subcommittee on Environment of the OAB/SP. In the following three years, he worked at SOS Mata Atlântica Foundation as legal advisor.

In 1999, Andre Lima moved to Brasilia to work on Socio-Environmental Institute (ISA), through which he was appointed adviser between 2002 and 2004, the National Council for Combating Discrimination (CNCD) of the Ministry of Justice (MJ).

== Defense of environmental issues ==
Since 1992, Andre Lima has been working in environmental movements and non-governmental organizations in the environmental area. From 2006 to 2010, he worked as monitor and collaborator of the Association for Ecological Development of the Federal District.

In 2007 and 2008, during the administration of then Minister Marina Silva, Andre Lima worked in the Brazilian Ministry of Environment (MMA). At that time he served as director of the Department of Joint Actions on Amazon, Director of the National Project on Environmental Management and Sustainable Development of the Amazon and accumulated the Board of the Department of Policies to Combat Deforestation, being one of the main responsibles for the articulations and the construction of the National Plan for Control of Deforestation in the Amazon, which contributed to reduce the average of devastation of the Amazon rainforest by more than 27,000 km² in 2004 to less than 5,000 km² in 2012.

He currently works as a legal consultant for SOS Mata Atlântica Foundation and as a public policy consultant at the Institute of Environmental Research in Amazonia (IPAM). Moreover, he is a member and founder of the Democracy and Sustainability Institute and effective member of ISA. Since 2011, Andre is a member of the National Council for the Environment (CONAMA), representing "The Institute of Law for a Green Planet".

== Publications ==
In 2006, Andre Lima had his book "Ecological-economic zoning of the Light Environmental Laws" published. Also, participated in interviews, debates on television, organized other publications, and has written several articles magazines and newspapers on issues related to public policy, biodiversity, sustainable development, protection and sustainable use of forests, and the right of peoples and indigenous and traditional populations.
