= Årum =

Neighborhood in Fredrikstad municipality, Norway

Coordinates: 59°16′N 11°07′E

Årum is a neighborhood in the north-eastern part of Fredrikstad municipality, Norway.

It is located below Sarpsfossen on the eastern bank of Glomma. Årum including the neighborhood Sundløkka had 1,183 inhabitants in 2023.

In transportation, Årum is known for the European route E6 passing it, with the Sannesund Bridge over Glomma landing at Årum.
