= SOS Mata Atlântica Foundation =

NGO based in Brazil

The SOS Mata Atlântica Foundation was created in 1986 as a non-governmental and non-profit organization, with the goal of defending what remains of Mata Atlântica (the Atlantic Forest) in Brazil. Its actions are divided in six areas: public policies; campaigns; documentation, information and communication for conservation; environmental education and good citizenship; institutional development; and sustainable development, protection and handling of ecosystems.

== Projects ==
Its most notable project, ClickArvore, aims at the reforestation of the Atlantic Forest. Since the year 2000, it has planted about 22 million native trees, covering an area of approximately 130 km^{2}. ClickArvore was idealized by Rodrigo Agostinho, who was elected mayor of Bauru in 2008.
