= Kamaras =

Kamaras (Καμάρας) is a Greek and Hungarian surname. Notable people with the surname include:

- Aristidis Kamaras (born 1939), Greek football player and lawyer
- Giorgos Kamaras (1929–2000), Greek football player
  - Georgios Kamaras Stadium
- György Kamarás (born 1998), Hungarian football player
- Iván Kamarás (born 1972), Hungarian actor
- Katalin Kamarás, Hungarian spectroscopist
- Máté Kamarás (born 1976), Hungarian singer and actor (Hungarian Wikipedia page link)

== See also ==
- Kamara (disambiguation)
