= Pinta =

Pinta may refer to:

- Pinta (ship), used by Christopher Columbus
- Pinta (yacht), yachts owned by Willi Illbruck
- Pinta (disease), a skin disease caused by Treponema carateum
- Pinta Island (also known as Abington Island) in the Galapagos Islands
- Pinta (software), a Paint.NET-like image drawing and editing program
- Pinta, slang for pint of milk after the Drinka pinta milka day advertising slogan
- Pinta Balletto, a character in Man on Fire by A.J. Quinnell

== See also ==
- Pint, unit of measurement
- Pinto (disambiguation)
