= Alvim =

Alvim may refer to:

== People with the surname ==
- Álvaro Alvim (1863-1928), Brazilian physician, radiologist, medical physicist and radiotherapist
- Beatriz Pereira Alvim (1380-1414), Portuguese, daughter of Nuno Álvares Pereira and first Duchess of Braganza
- Cesário Alvim (1839-1903), Brazilian politician, journalist, and lawyer, twice Governor of Minas Gerais and Mayor of the Federal District (Rio de Janeiro)
- Diogo António José Leite Pereira de Melo e Alvim, Portuguese colonial Governor of Portuguese Guinea (Guinea-Bissau)
- José J. de Sá Freire Alvim (1909-1981), Brazilian mayor of the Distrito Federal of Rio de Janeiro
- Paulo de Tarso Alvim (1919-2011), Brazilian recipient of the Order of Scientific Merit in Biology

== Other uses ==
- Alvim, Sarpsborg, Norway

== See also ==
- Artur Alvim, a district in the subprefecture of Penha, São Paulo, Brazil
- Artur Alvim (São Paulo Metro), São Paulo metro station, Brazil
