= Mendonça =

Mendonça (Portuguese pronunciation: [mẽˈdõsɐ]) is a Portuguese and Galician surname of Basque origin. It sometimes appears as the anglicized forms Mendonca or Mendonsa. The Spanish variant is Mendoza. The name has been often linked with royalty. The name may refer to:

== General ==
- Mendonça Filho (born 1966), Brazilian company administrator and politician
- Ana de Mendonça (1460–1542), Portuguese mistress of King John II of Portugal
- André Mendonça (born 1972), Brazilian attorney, Presbyterian pastor and politician
- Carla Mendonça (born 1961), English actress
- Clare Mendonça (1910–1953), Indian journalist
- Cristóvão de Mendonça (1475–1532), Portuguese explorer
- Duda Mendonça (1944–2021), Brazilian public relations specialist
- Eneida A. Mendonça, Brazilian-born physician-scientist / biomedical informatician
- Francisco de Ascensão Mendonça (1889–1982), Portuguese botanist
- Gaelyn Mendonca, Indian actress
- Gilbert Mendonca (1952–2025), Indian politician
- Gilberto Mendonça Teles (born 1931), Brazilian writer
- Grace Mendonça (born 1968), Brazilian lawyer and university professor
- Henrique Lopes de Mendonça (1856–1939), Portuguese poet, playwright and naval officer
- Kleber Mendonça Filho (born 1968), Brazilian film director, screenwriter and producer
- Leoni Mendonça, Brazilian Senator and businessman
- Leroy A. Mendonca (1932–1951), United States Army posthumous recipient of the Medal of Honor for action in Korea
- Maria Luísa Mendonça (born 1970), Brazilian actress
- Mauro Mendonça (born 1931), Brazilian actor
- Mauro Mendonça Filho (born 1965), Brazilian television director
- Nuno José Severo de Mendonça Rolim de Moura Barreto (1804–1875), Portuguese prime minister
- Stacey Mendonca, New Zealand quantity surveyor

== Musicians ==
- Eduardo Mendonça (born 1960), Brazilian musician
- Frankee Mendonça, American musician
- Jason Mendonça, British musician
- Kathy Mendonca, American musician
- Marília Mendonça (1995–2021), Brazilian singer-songwriter
- Newton Mendonça (1927–1960), Brazilian musician
- Paulo Mendonça, Swedish musician
- Stella Mendonça (born 1970), Mozambican opera singer
- Walter Wanderley (1932–1986), Brazilian organist (born Walter Jose Wanderley Mendonça)
- Ronald Mendonça, American musician

== Sports ==
- Mendonça (footballer, born 1956) (1956–2019), Brazilian footballer
- Mendonça (footballer, born 1995), Brazilian footballer
- Andrew Mendonça (born 2000), Angolan footballer
- António Mendonça (born 1982), Angolan footballer
- Bianca Mendonça (born 1993), Brazilian rhythmic gymnast
- Clive Mendonca (born 1968), British footballer
- Erick Mendonça (born 1995), Mexican-born Portuguese futsal player
- Gustavo Mendonça (born 2003), Portuguese footballer
- Ivor Mendonca (1934–2014), West Indian cricketer
- João Paulo Mendonça (born 1958), Portuguese judoka
- Jorge Mendonça (1954–2006), Brazilian footballer
- Jorge Alberto Mendonça (born 1938), Portuguese/Angolan footballer
- Leon Luke Mendonca (born 2006), Indian chess grandmaster
- Marcelo Mendonça de Mattos (born 1984), Brazilian footballer
- Mário Mendonça (born 1991), Portuguese footballer
- Romero Mendonça Sobrinho (born 1975), Brazilian footballer
- Sandro da Silva Mendonça (born 1983), Brazilian footballer
- Tommy Mendonca (born 1988), American baseball player

== See also ==
- Mendonça, São Paulo, a municipality in the state of São Paulo, Brazil
- Mendoza, Spanish variant
- Mendonsa, an Indian variant
