= Rosa Amorim =

Brazilian politician (born 1996)

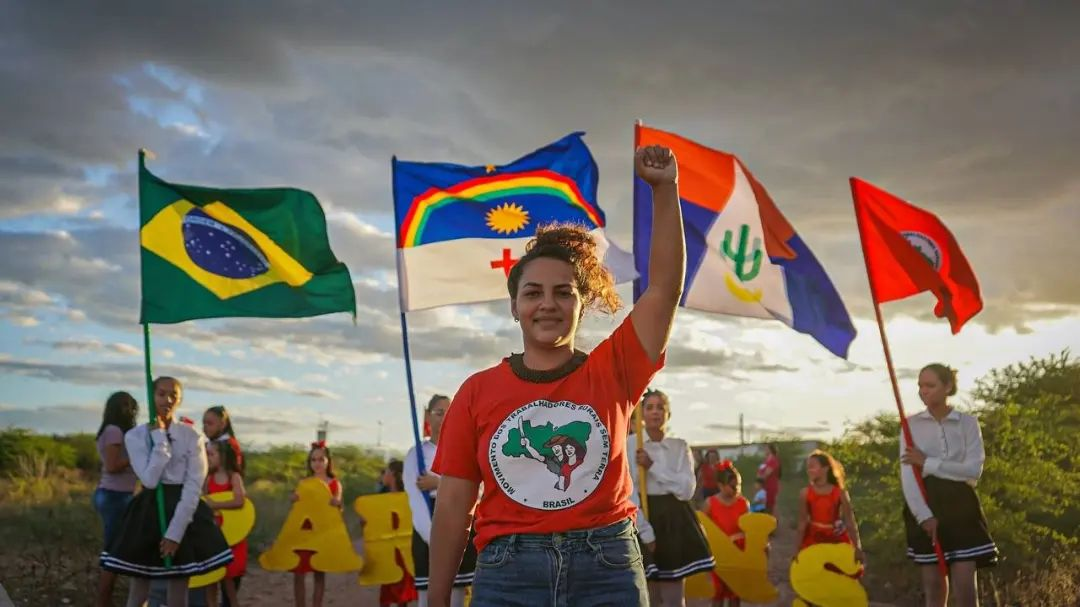
- Amorim in 2022

Member of the Legislative Assembly of Pernambuco
- Incumbent
- Assumed office 1 February 2023

Personal details
- Born: 1 December 1996 (age 29)
- Party: Workers' Party (since 2022)

Rosa Karina Souza de Amorim (born 1 December 1996) is a Brazilian politician serving as a member of the Legislative Assembly of Pernambuco since 2023. She previously served as director of culture of the National Union of Students.

== Biography ==
Daughter of MST Pernambuco leaders Rubneuza Leandro and Jaime Amorim, Rosa Amorim was born in Caruaru and raised in the Normandia settlement, in the rural area of the municipality. During her childhood and adolescence, she accompanied her parents on marches, occupations, and MST meetings.

At age 16, she became involved in student movements, joining the Popular Youth Uprising. During this period, she enrolled in the theater course at the Federal University of Pernambuco. Later, she became the cultural director of the National Union of Students (UNE).

She spearheaded the Mãos Solidárias (lit. 'Solidarity Hands') campaign during the Covid-19 pandemic, which created community kitchens, food banks, and community gardens in Pernambuco, and was the coordinator of the Armazém do Campo in the center of the state's capital, Recife.

In 2022, she ran for state representative for the Workers' Party. She was elected with 42,632 votes.

== Personal life ==
Rosa identifies as a black lesbian.
