= Stella Mendonça =

Stella Piedade Mendonça
- Born: 10 August 1970 (age 55); Nampula, Mozambique
- Education: Conservatoire national supérieur de musique et de danse de Lyon
- Occupation: Operatic soprano
- Years active: 1993–present

Stella Mendonça (born 10 August 1970) is a Mozambican operatic soprano specializing in the bel canto repertoire. In 2002 Mendonça collaborated in adapting Georges Bizet's opera Carmen for African audiences and then performed it in Mozambique.

== Career ==
Born in Nampula, Mozambique, Mendonça received her vocal education at the Conservatoire national supérieur de musique et de danse de Lyon in Lyon, France, on a full scholarship and subsequently studied with Dennis Hall, Ernst Haefliger, Magda Olivero. She studied Lieder with Verena Schwermer and Peter Berne. Mendonça made her debut in the title role of Franz Lehar's The Merry Widow, although most of her early roles were in various oratorios such as Giovanni Pergolesi’s Stabat Mater, Gioachino Rossini’s Petite messe solennelle, and Gabriel Fauré’s Requiem. Subsequent roles have included "Mimi" in Giacomo Puccini's La bohème and "Bess" in George Gershwin's Porgy and Bess. In 2002, she collaborated with the opera singer Mark Jackson in adapting Carmen and then produced the opera and starred in the leading role during performances in Maputo and Beira. This was the first-ever performance of an opera in Beira.

She founded SONÇA international in 1998 to promote arts education in Africa. Resident in Switzerland since 1993, she runs and teaches at the studio di belcanto that continues the tradition of the voice technique by Garcia y Lamperti. As of 2010, she was attempting to adapt Mia Couto's award-winning novel, Sleepwalking Land (Terra Sonâmbula) into an opera using a libretto by Henning Mankell.

== Sources ==
- Azevedo, Mario; Nnadozie, Emmanuel & Mbuia, Tomé (2003). Historical Dictionary of Mozambique (2nd ed.). Lanham, Maryland: Scarecrow Press. ISBN 0-8108-3792-7.
