= NRP Corte Real =

NRP Corte Real or Corte-Real has been the name of more than one Portuguese Navy ship, and may refer to:

- NRP Corte Real (F334), a frigate in commission from 1957 to 1968; previously served in the United States Navy as USS McCoy Reynolds (DE-440)
- NRP Corte-Real (F332), a frigate in commission since 1992
