= Álvaro Alvim =

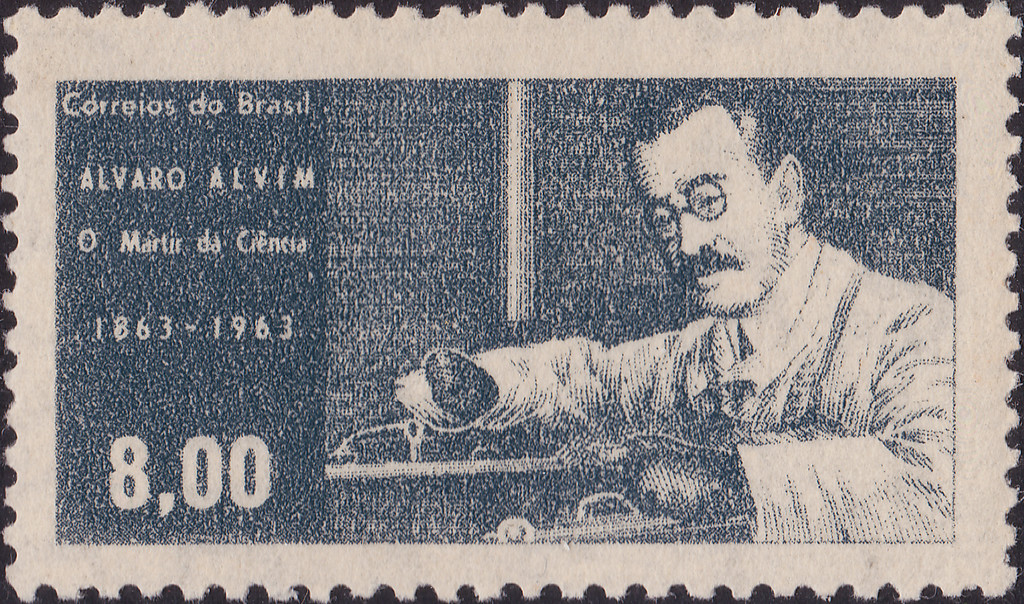
Alvaro Alvim, radiologist, the “martyr of science”. Brazil. 1963. Postage stamp.

Álvaro Freire de Villalba Alvim (16 April 1863 – 21 May 1928) was a Brazilian physician, pioneer in radiology and radiotherapy. He studied in France with Pierre and Marie Curie and performed the first radiograph in Brazil, which was on the xiphopagus case for Brazilian surgeon Eduardo Chapot Prévost.

== Life and Times ==
Álvaro Alvim was born on 16 April 1863 in Vassouras, Rio de Janeiro, Brazil, the son of Carlos Freire Alvim y Villalba and Mariana Amélia de Carvalho. He died from leukemia on 21 May 1928 in his home state of Rio de Janeiro.

Alvim graduated in 1887 with a degree in medicine from the Faculty of Medicine of Bahia. In 1896 he traveled to France and studied medical physics in the clinic of Marie Curie and Pierre Curie. While in Europe Alvim purchased X-ray equipment that would be installed in his clinic upon returning to Brazil. He was to establish clinics for electrotherapy, physiotherapy, radiotherapy and radiology in Rio de Janeiro. Alvim was the founder and director of clinics for: Assistance to Poor Children; Institute of Electricity; Electrology and Radiology Institute; and the Casa de la Cultura Laura Alvim.

Alvim married Laura Paglia Agostini Alvim, the daughter of Angelo Agostini, and the couple had 3 children: Mariana, Alvaro, and Laura. The Casa da Cultura Laura Alvim clinic was named in his daughter's honor. The family lived in a newly established neighborhood in Ipanema, Rio de Janeiro.

== Achievements ==
- Obtained the first radiograph of xiphopagous twins, (twins: Rosalina and Maria Pinheiro Davel) in the world (1897) permitting Eduardo Chapot Prévost to perform his operation. This case was the first of its kind in the world that utilized radiography on conjoined twin sisters and the first noted case of X-ray utilization in Brazil, with equipment installed and operated by Alvim. Alvim was honored with streets and hospitals of Rio de Janeiro named in his honor. A documentary short film was made regarding the event with cinematography and direction by Antônio Leal of Portugal. "Operação das Xifópagas Pelo Dr. Chapot Prevost". (Operation of Siamese twins By Dr. Chapot Prevost). Released in Brazil on 20 May 1907.
- Humanitarian Medal award by President Artur Bernardes.
- Considered the martyr of Brazilian Science
- Contributed to the invention of leaded paper, effective in reducing radiation exposure to early radiologists

== Clinics ==
- Assistance to Poor Children
- Institute of Electricity
- Electrology and Radiology Institute
- Casa de la Cultura Laura Alvim

== Accolades and Honors ==
In 1963, the post office of Brazil, Brazil Post issued a commemorative postage stamp in his honor and declared Alvim as the "martyr of science".

== Places that bear the name Álvaro Alvim ==
- Rua Álvaro Alvim, Rio de Janeiro
- Hospital Escola Álvaro Alvim
- Unidade Álvaro Alvim – HCPA
- Álvaro Alvim ESPM University
- Escola Municipal Álvaro Alvim
- Colégio Estadual Álvaro Alvim

== Select publications ==
- Alvim, A. (1902). A Electricidade perante a medicina. Rio de Janeiro.
- Alvim, A. (1929). Confrontos e deduções. Minas Gerais. Secretaria da Agricultura. Minas e o Bicentenário do Cafeeiro no Brasil (1727/1927). Imprensa Oficial, Belo Horizonte.
- Alvim, A. The Healer Medicine.
- Alvim, A. Institute of Medical Electricity.
- Alvim, A. The Cure of Cancer in Brazil.
