= Carreira =

Carreira may refer to:

- Carreira (surname)
- Carreira (Ribeira), a parish in the municipality of Ribeira, Galicia, Spain
- Carreira (Barcelos), a parish in the municipality of Barcelos, Portugal
- Carreira (Santo Tirso), a parish in the municipality of Santo Tirso, Portugal

== See also ==
- Carreiras (Portalegre), a parish in Portalegre Municipality, Portugal
