= António Carreira =

Portuguese composer and organist

António Carreira (Lisbon, ca. 1520-30 - Lisbon, ca. 1597) was a Portuguese composer and organist of the Renaissance.

He held the post of organist at the Royal Chapel in Lisbon. His compositions (Fantasias, Tientos, Chansons) reveal his high contrapuntal craftsmanship. Most of his surviving works can be found in manuscripts at the University of Coimbra. A particularly interesting work is the Canción "Con qué la lavaré", where the organ part to accompany this popular song is written in the "Tento" form. This constitutes one of the earliest European examples of written instrumental accompaniment to a song.

== Discography ==
- Fantasia on the 1st tone - on Early Iberian Organ Music, Parkins Naxos 1993.
- Tiento - on Masters of the Royal Chapel, Lisbon, dir. Rees. Hyperion 1994.
- Canção a Quatro glosada - on Spanish and Portuguese Harpsichord, Sophie Yates (harpsichord), Chandos 1994.
