= Assunção =

Assunção is a Portuguese surname or part of a given name, such in as Maria da Assunção. It may refer to:

- Fábio Assunção (born 1971), Brazilian actor
- Fernando O. Assunção (1931–2006), Uruguayan anthropologist
- Gustavo Assunção (born 2000), Brazilian footballer, son of Paulo
- Leilane Assunção (1981–2018), Brazilian professor and activist
- Paula Assunção (born 1993), Brazilian model
- Paulo Assunção (born 1980), Brazilian footballer
- Marcos Assunção (born 1976), Brazilian footballer
- Infanta Maria da Assunção of Portugal (1805–1834), Portuguese princess
- Raphael Assunção (born 1982), Brazilian mixed martial artist
