= Câmara =

Câmara (meaning "chamber") is a common surname in the Portuguese language. It may also refer to:

== People ==
- António de Vasconcelos e Sousa Câmara Caminha Faro e Veiga, 8th Count of Calheta, 4th Marquis of Castelo Melhor and Constable of Portugal
- D. João da Câmara, Portuguese writer
- Eugênia Câmara, Portuguese actress
- Gilberto Câmara, Brazilian computer scientist
- Hélder Câmara, Brazilian archbishop
- Hélder Câmara (chess player), Brazilian chess master
- Joana Tomásia da Câmara, 14th and last donatary captain of the island of São Miguel, Portugal
- João Câmara, Brazilian painter
- Ronald Câmara, Brazilian chess master
- Paulo Câmara, Brazilian politician
- Renato Câmara (born 1972), Brazilian politician
- Sérgio Sette Câmara, Brazilian racing driver
- José da Câmara Teles, 13th donatary captain of the island of São Miguel, Portugal
- Luís Manuel da Câmara, 12th donatary captain of the island of São Miguel, Portugal
- Rafael Câmara, Brazilian racing driver

== Places ==
- Câmara de Lobos, city and municipality in Madeira, Portugal
- Estreito de Câmara de Lobos, a parish in Madeira, Portugal

== Other ==
- Câmara Defense, also Gunderam Defense or Brazilian Defense is a rarely played chess opening
- TV Câmara, Brazilian television channel responsible for broadcasting activity from the Brazilian Chamber of Deputies
- Câmara may also mean Chamber of Deputies in a number of different countries
- Câmara may also mean a Câmara Municipal, the executive body of a municipality in Portugal, and legislative body of Brazilian municipalities

== See also ==
- Camara (disambiguation)
- Kamara (disambiguation)
