= Davi Brandão =

Brazilian politician (born 1997)

Member of the Legislative Assembly of Maranhão
- Incumbent
- Assumed office 1 February 2023

Personal details
- Born: 19 August 1997 (age 29)
- Party: Brazilian Democratic Movement

Davi Brandão Farias (born 19 August 1997) is a Brazilian politician serving as a member of the Legislative Assembly of Maranhão since 2023. He has served as first secretary of the Assembly since 2025. From 2018 to 2022, he served as secretary of administration of Bacabal.
