= Juninho (footballer, born April 1981) =

Brazilian footballer

Personal information
- Full name: Renato Agostinho de Oliveira Júnior
- Date of birth: April 25, 1981 (age 45)
- Place of birth: Santa Rita do Passa Quatro, Brazil
- Height: 1.79 m (5 ft 10 in)
- Position: Central defender

Youth career
- 2001–2002: Pirassununguense-SP

Senior career*
Years	Team	Apps	(Gls)
2002–2005	Guarani		
2005–2009	Atlético-PR		
2006	→ Ceará (loan)		
2007–2008	→ Fortaleza (loan)		
2009	ABC	6	(0)
2010	Itumbiara		
2011	Ceará	0	(0)
2011	Salgueiro	6	(0)
2012	Anapolina		
- * Club domestic league appearances and goals

Renato Agostinho de Oliveira Júnior or simply Juninho (born April 25, 1981 in Santa Rita do Passa Quatro), is a Brazilian central defender.

== Honours ==
- Ceará State League: 2007
