= Kamara (given name) =

Kamara is a given name. Notable people with the name include:

- Kamara Bacchus (born 1986), British actress and radio personality
- Kamara Ghedi (born 1976), Romanian singer
- Kamara James (1984–2014), American Olympic fencer

== See also ==
- Kamara (surname)
