= Bandeira do Sul =

Municipality in Minas Gerais, Brazil

Coordinates: 21°47′S 46°23′W

- Municipality
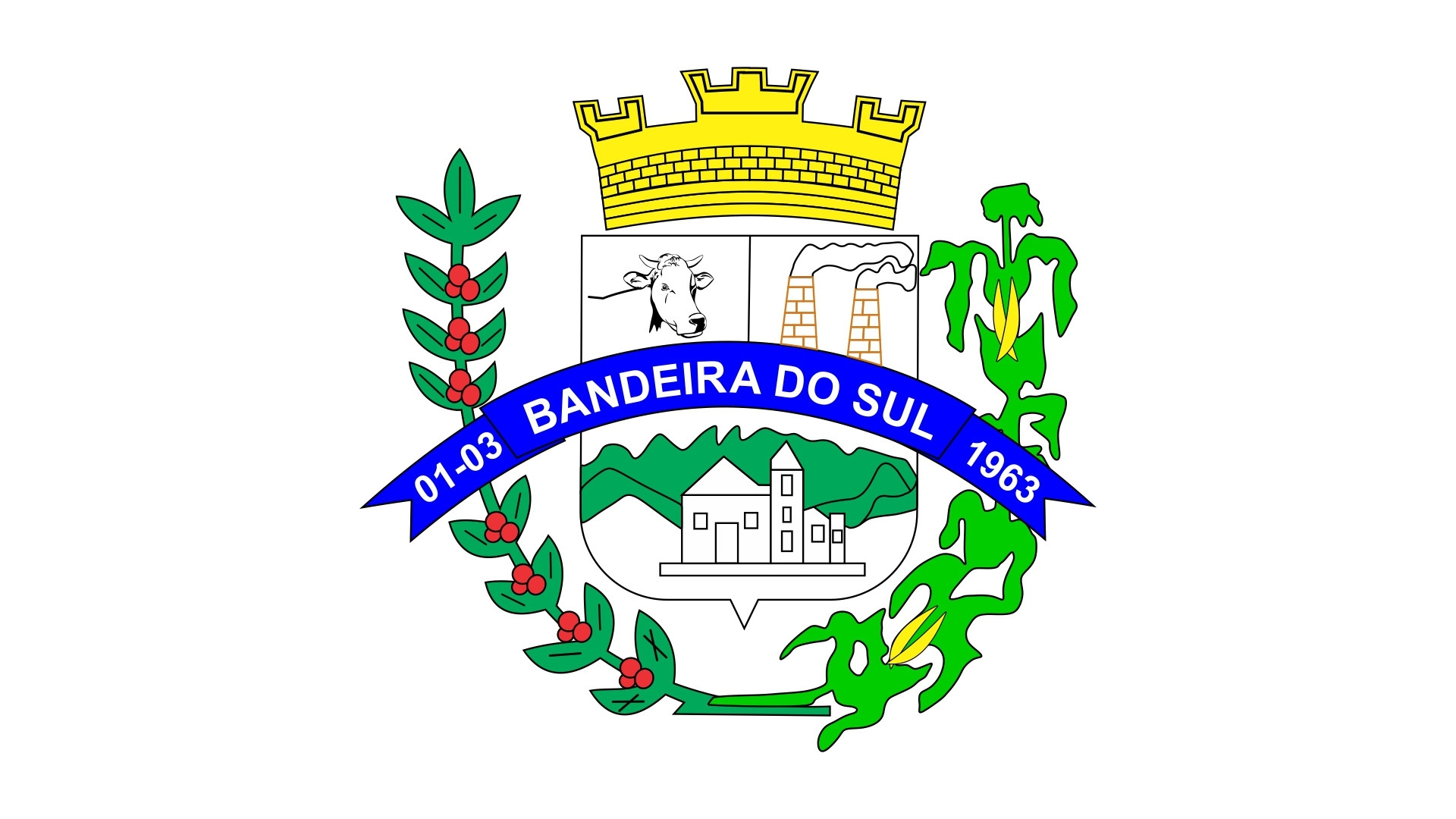
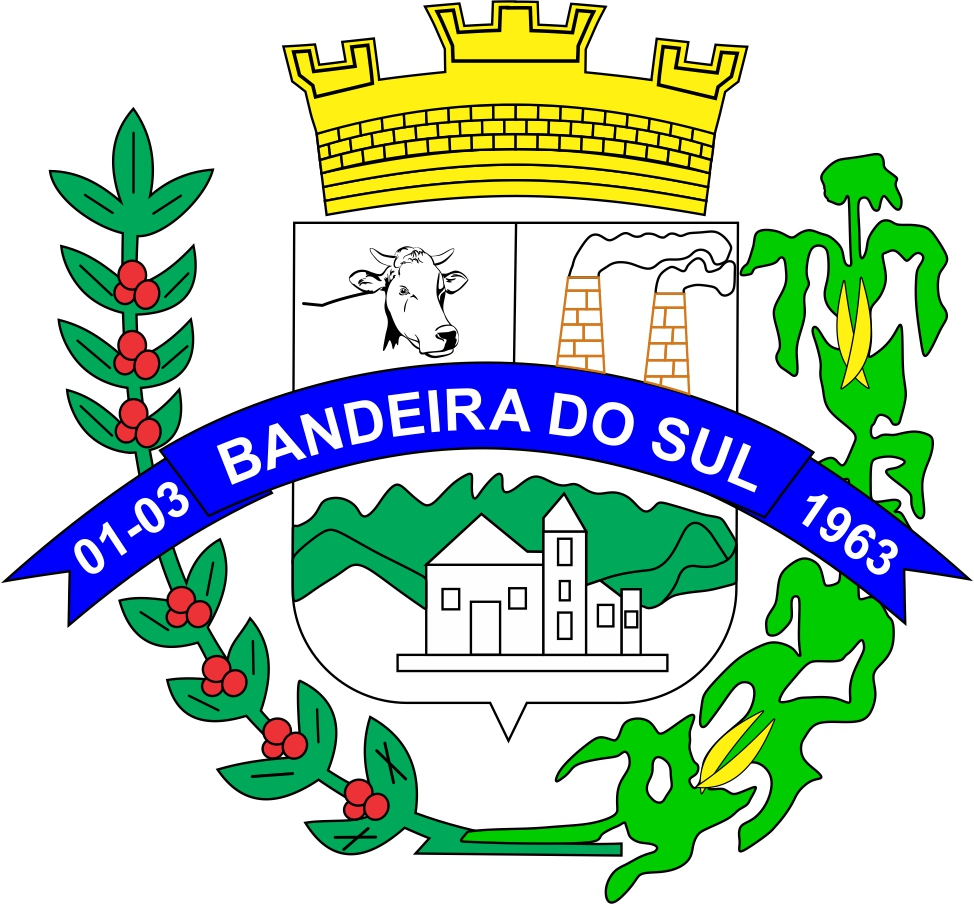
- Flag Coat of arms
- Interactive map of Bandeira do Sul
- Country: Brazil
- State: Minas Gerais
- Region: Southeast
- Time zone: UTC−3 (BRT)

Location of Bandeira do Sul within Minas Gerais

Bandeira do Sul is a municipality in the state of Minas Gerais, Brazil. Its population as of 2020 is estimated to be 5,778 people, living between 660 and 989 meters elevation.

The area of Bandeira do Sul is 46.9 km^{2} (18.1 sq mi). The city belongs to the mesoregion of Sul e Sudoeste de Minas and to the microregion of Poços de Caldas.

== See also ==
- List of municipalities in Minas Gerais
