= Pinto (disambiguation) =

Pinto is a surname.

Pinto may also refer to:

== Biology and engineering ==
- AJI T-610 Super Pinto, a modified version of the Temco TT Pinto
- Pinto bean, a type of mottled bean
- Pinto horse, a horse coat color that consists of large patches of white and another color
- Ford Pinto, a subcompact car manufactured by the Ford Motor Company for the North American market
- Temco TT Pinto, a jet-powered, tandem two-place primary trainer aircraft used by the United States Navy

== Subculture ==
- Pinto (subculture), a Chicano subculture of people who are or have been incarcerated

== Places ==
- Pinto, Chile
- Pinto, Magdalena, Colombia
- Cittá Pinto or Qormi, Malta
- Pinto, Madrid, Spain
- Pinto, Maryland, United States
- Pinto, Santiago del Estero, Argentina
- Pinto Battery, a former artillery battery in Birżebbuġa, Malta

== Films ==
- Pinto (film), a 1920 American comedy western film directed by Victor Schertzinger

== Music ==
- Pinto (album), a 2022 album by Canadian country artist Sykamore

== See also ==
- Gallo pinto, a dish traditional to Nicaragua and Costa Rica consisting primarily of beans and rice
- Conspiracy of the Pintos, a rebellion against Portuguese rule in Goa, India in 1787
- María Pinto, a town and commune in Chile
- Palo Pinto County, Texas, United States
- Pinto Martins International Airport, Brazil
- Rodovia Carvalho Pinto, a highway in Brazil
- Estádio Governador Magalhães Pinto or Estádio Mineirão, a football stadium in Brazil
- Pint, a unit of measurement
- Pinta (disambiguation)
- Pintos (disambiguation)
