= António de Gama Pereira =

Portuguese jurist

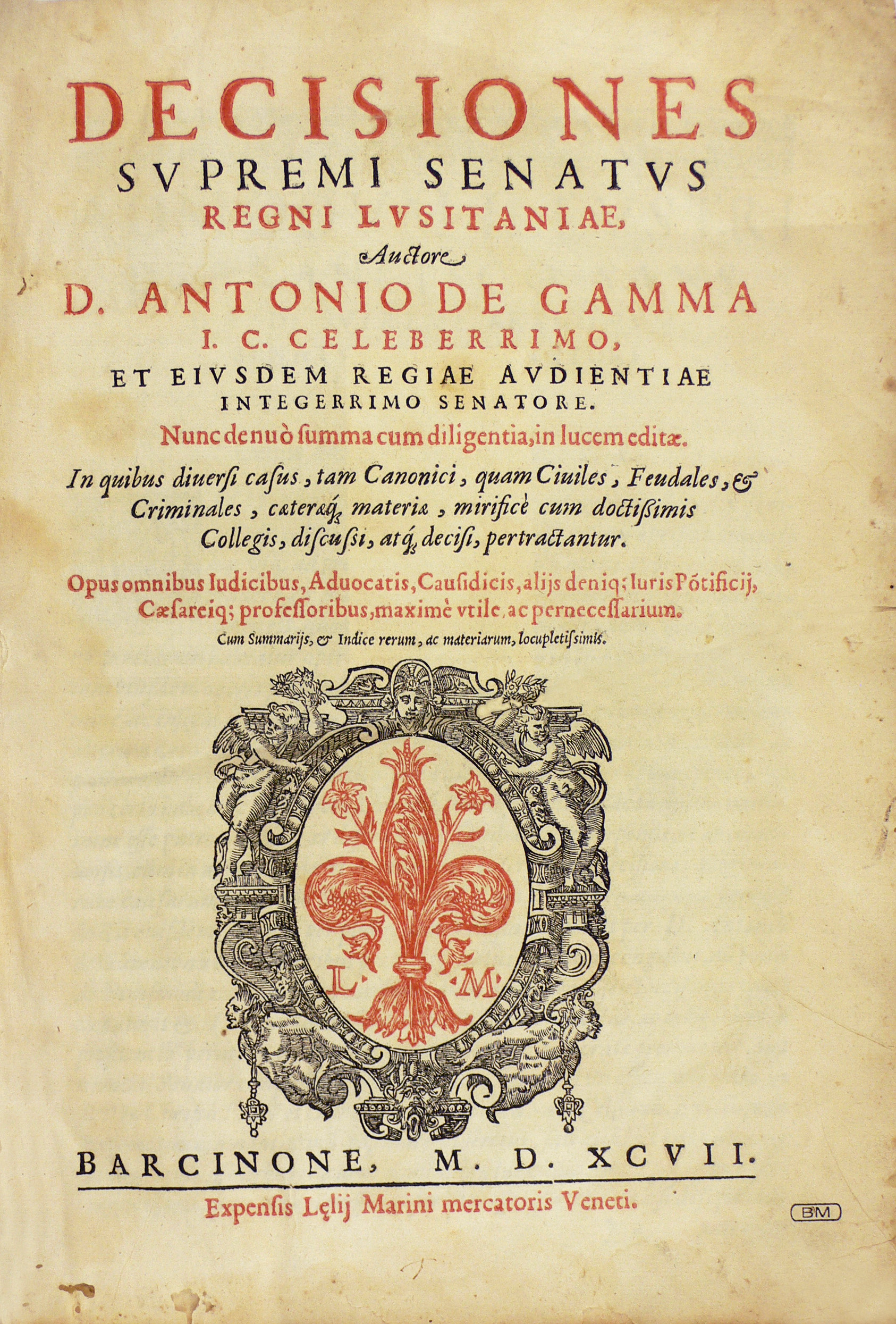
Decisiones supremi Senatus Regni Lusitaniae, 1597.

António de Gama Pereira (1520–1604) was a Portuguese jurist.

After studies in Coimbra and Bologna from 1537 to 1549, he served on Portugal's highest courts, the Casa de Suplicação and the Desembargo do Paço. His most significant work, the Decisiones Supremi Senatus Lusitaniae centuriae IV (1578), a much-edited compilation of supreme court decisions, were republished in Venice and Antwerp, attesting to their pan-European scholarly impact.
