= Bruno Amorim (footballer) =

Portuguese footballer

Personal information
- Full name: Bruno Rafael Martins Amorim
- Date of birth: 12 May 1998 (age 28)
- Place of birth: Vale de Cambra, Portugal
- Height: 1.67 m (5 ft 6 in)
- Position: Forward

Team information
- Current team: Sanjoanense
- Number: 7

Youth career
- 2006–2009: CDC Macieira de Cambra
- 2009–2016: UD Oliveirense

Senior career*
Years	Team	Apps	(Gls)
2016–2018	UD Oliveirense	6	(0)
2018–2019	Feirense II		
2019–	Sanjoanense	3	(1)
- * Club domestic league appearances and goals as of 13:48, 2 October 2019 (UTC)

Bruno Rafael Martins Amorim (born 12 May 1998) is a Portuguese footballer who plays for A.D. Sanjoanense as a forward.

== Career ==
On 17 January 2016, Amorim made his professional debut with Oliveirense in a 2015–16 Segunda Liga match against Farense. In 2017, it was confirmed by multiple sources that he was under trial at Manchester United with a view to a possible transfer to the English club.

== Playing style ==
The Daily Mirror has remarked that Amorim has 'incredible pace and trickery'.
