= João Câmara =

Brazilian painter

João Câmara Filho, born in João Pessoa, Paraíba (Brazil), in 1944, is a Brazilian painter. He lives and works in Olinda, in the state of Pernambuco.

The artist thinks of himself principally as a painter, but has also extensive work in lithography.

João Câmara produces individual works and also theme series.

He has created three theme series. "Scenes from Brazilian Life", produced between 1974 and 1976, comprises 10 paintings and 100 lithographs on the theme of the Vargas period in Brazilian History (Getúlio Dorneles Vargas, 1882–1954, was president and dictator of Brazil). "Ten Love Affairs and a Painting by Camara", produced between 1976 and 1983, consists of a source book (lithographs), a triptych, 10 large paintings, 70 lytographs, 22 assemblages and three objects.Two Cities, produced between 1987 and 2001, consists of 38 paintings and 18 objects.

More information on João Câmara and his works can be found in his website.

== Bibliography on the artist ==
- Cenas da Vida Brasileira. Frederico Morais, 1980.
- Dez Casos de Amor - Teoria e corpo do pintor secreto. Frederico Morais, 1983.
- João Câmara'. Jacob Klintowitz, 1993.
- João Câmara - O Revelador de Paradoxos Político-Sociais. Almerinda da Silva Lopes, 1995.
- João Câmara - Trilogia. Antologia. Takano Editora, 2003.
