= Cavaco, Angola =

Town in Angola

Cavaco
- Town
- Location within Angola
- Coordinates: 12°33′52″S 13°26′33″E
- Country: Angola
- Province: Benguela
- Time zone: UTC+1:00 (WAT)

Cavaco is a small town in Angola, located in Africa near the coast. The population figures for a 7 kilometer radius from the town is nearly 140,000.

== Cavaco River ==
The town of Cavaco is associated with the densely populated Cavaco River where several bridges have been recently constructed. In 2026, the river flooded and hundreds of families were displaced and a few people died.
