= Braga (surname) =

Braga is a surname that can be found in Portuguese, Galician, and Italian language. Notable people with the name include:

- Abel Braga (born 1952), Brazilian football manager and player
- Aguinaldo Braga (born 1974), Brazilian-Macedonian football player
- Alice Braga (born 1983), Brazilian actress
- Ana Maria Braga (born 1949), Brazilian journalist, chef, and TV personality
- A. J. Braga (1900–1968), Singaporean politician
- Francisco Braga (1868–1945), Brazilian music composer
- Brannon Braga (born 1965), American television producer and screenwriter
- Bruno Manuel Araújo Braga (born 1983), Portuguese footballer
- Carlo Braga (1889–1971), Filipino priest
- Carlos Alberto Ferreira Braga (1907–2006), Brazilian songwriter
- Cícero Braga (born 1958), Brazilian chess master
- Corin Braga (born 1961), Romanian writer and academic
- Eduardo Braga (born 1960), Brazilian politician and businessman
- Erasmo de Carvalho Braga (1877–1932), Brazilian Protestant evangelical leader
- Ernani Braga (1888–1948), Brazilian music composer
- Fábio Braga (born 1992), Portuguese footballer
- Fernando Braga (born 1958), Argentine and Italian chess master
- Gabriel Braga Nunes (born 1972), Brazilian actor
- Gaetano Braga (1829–1907), Italian composer and cellist
- Gilberto Braga (1945–2021), Brazilian screenwriter
- Glauber Braga (born 1982), Brazilian politician
- Inês Braga (born 1984), Portuguese female water polo player
- Joly Braga Santos (1924–1988), Portuguese composer and conductor
- Marcia Andrade Braga, Brazilian military officer and peacekeeper
- Márcio Braga (born 1936), Brazilian football president
- Oscar Lino Lopes Fernandes Braga (1931–2020), Angolan Roman Catholic bishop
- Paulo Braga (born 1942), Brazilian drummer and composer
- Regina Braga (born 1946), Brazilian actress
- Roberto Carlos Braga (born 1941), Brazilian singer
- Rubem Braga (1913–1990), Brazilian writer of short stories
- Saudade Braga (1948–2024), Brazilian politician
- Sônia Braga (born 1950), Brazilian actress
- Teófilo Braga (1843–1924), Portuguese politician, writer and playwright
- Torben Braga (born 1991), German politician
- Vladimir Braga (fl. 2005–2009), Moldovan politician
