= Cavaco (surname) =

Cavaco is a Portuguese surname.

Notable people with this name include:

- Alberto Cavaco (born 1915), Portuguese botanist
- Aníbal Cavaco Silva (born 1939), Portuguese politician, former President of the Portuguese Republic
- Maria Cavaco Silva (born 1938), the wife of Aníbal Cavaco Silva
- Luís Cavaco (born 1972), Portuguese footballer

== See also ==
- Cavaquinho, a Portuguese guitar
- Cavaco, Angola, a coastal town
- Cavacoa, a genus of Sub-Saharan plants
