= Gama (surname) =

- Pronunciation: /ɡæm.ə/

Origin
- Origin: Latin and Greek
- Region of origin: Southern Europe

Other names
- Variant forms: da Gama, Gamma, Gammarra

Gama or Gamma is a Portuguese surname. Originating in southern Europe, Gama is a common surname in Portugal, Spain, Italy and countries colonized by Portugal, such as Brazil and Southern parts of Africa.

== People ==
- Almerinda Farias Gama (1899–1999), Brazilian lawyer and trade unionist
- Antonio de León y Gama (1735–1802), Mexican astronomer, anthropologist and writer
- António de Gama Pereira (1520–1604), Portuguese jurist
- Armando Gama (1954–2022), Portuguese singer
- Basílio da Gama (1740–1795), Portuguese-Brazilian poet and member of the Society of Jesus
- Bruno Gama (born 1987), Portuguese footballer
- Cristóvão da Gama (c.1516–1542), Portuguese military commander, explorer, and son of Vasco da Gama
- Dagoberto Gama (born 1959), Mexican actor
- Diego de Souza Gama Silva (born 1984), Brazilian footballer
- Diogo Gama (born 1981), Portuguese rugby union player
- Domício da Gama (1862–1925), Brazilian journalist, diplomat and writer
- Donato Gama da Silva (born 1962), Brazilian footballer
- Estêvão da Gama (15th century) (c.1430–1497), Portuguese nobleman and father of Vasco da Gama
- Estêvão da Gama (16th century) (c.1505–1576), Portuguese explorer and son of Vasco da Gama
- Estêvão da Gama (c.1470), Portuguese explorer and cousin of Vasco da Gama
- Francisco de Saldanha da Gama (1723–1776), Portuguese Cardinal Patriarch of Lisbon
- Gaspar da Gama (1444–c.1510s), Polish Jew merchant who acted as interpreter in the Portuguese discoveries
- Jaime Federico Said Camil Saldaña da Gama, known professionally as Jaime Camil, Mexican actor, singer and television personality
- Jaime Gama (born 1947), Portuguese politician
- João da Gama (c. 1540 – after 1591), Portuguese explorer and colonial administrator, grandson of Vasco da Gama
- Julia Gama (born 1993), Brazilian actress and Miss Brasil 2020 winner
- Leopoldo da Gama (1843–1929), Goan journalist and writer
- Leovegildo Lins da Gama Júnior (born 1954), Brazilian former professional footballer
- Owen Da Gama (born 1961), former South African footballer and manager
- Paulo da Gama (c.1465–1499), Portuguese explorer and older brother of Vasco da Gama
- Pio Gama Pinto (1927–1965), Kenyan journalist and politician
- Saldanha da Gama (1846–1895), admiral of the Brazilian Navy
- Sebastião da Gama (1924–1952), Portuguese poet
- Siyabonga Gama, South African politician
- Vasco da Gama (c.1460s–1524), Portuguese explorer and the first European to reach India by sea
- Vasco da Gama (council speaker) (born 1959), South African politician
- Vasco da Gama Fernandes (1908–1991), Portuguese politician
- Vasco da Gama Rodrigues (1909–1991), Portuguese poet
- Zainab Amir Gama (born 1949), Tanzanian politician
- Lawrence Gama, Tanzanian politician
- Leonidas Gama, Tanzanian politician

== See also ==
- Gama (disambiguation)
