= Caldas Brandão =

- Municipality
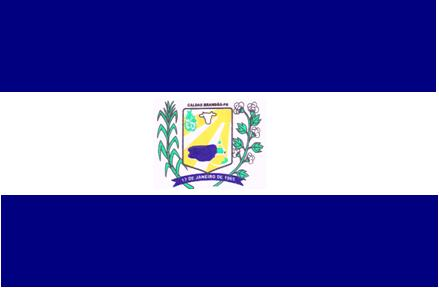
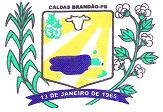
- Flag Coat of arms

- Location in Brazil
- Coordinates: 6.10278°S 35.3258°W
- Country: Brazil
- Region: South
- State: Paraíba
- Mesoregion: Agreste Paraibano

Population (2020)
  - Total: 6,046
- Time zone: UTC−3 (BRT)

Caldas Brandão (Central northeastern portuguese pronunciation: [ˈkɐwdɐs bɾɐ̃ˈdɐ̃w]) is a municipality in the state of Paraíba in the Northeast Region of Brazil.

== See also ==
- List of municipalities in Paraíba
