= Corte-Real =

Corte-Real, sometimes Corte Real, is a surname of Portuguese origin, which means literally "Royal Court". It may refer to:

People

- Corte-Real family, a Portuguese noble family of explorers
- João Vaz Corte-Real (died 1496), Portuguese explorer
- Miguel Corte-Real (c. 1448–1502), Portuguese explorer
- Gaspar Corte-Real (c. 1450–1501), Portuguese explorer and brother of Miguel
- Jerónimo Corte-Real (1533–1588), Portuguese epic poet
- Manuel de Moura e Corte Real, 2nd Marquis of Castelo Rodrigo (1590–1651), Portuguese Governor of the Spanish Netherlands (1644–1647)

Ships

- CMA CGM Corte Real, a containership
- NRP Corte Real, more than one Portuguese Navy ship

Other

- Corte Real palace
