= Leilane Assunção =

Brazilian historian, researcher and professor

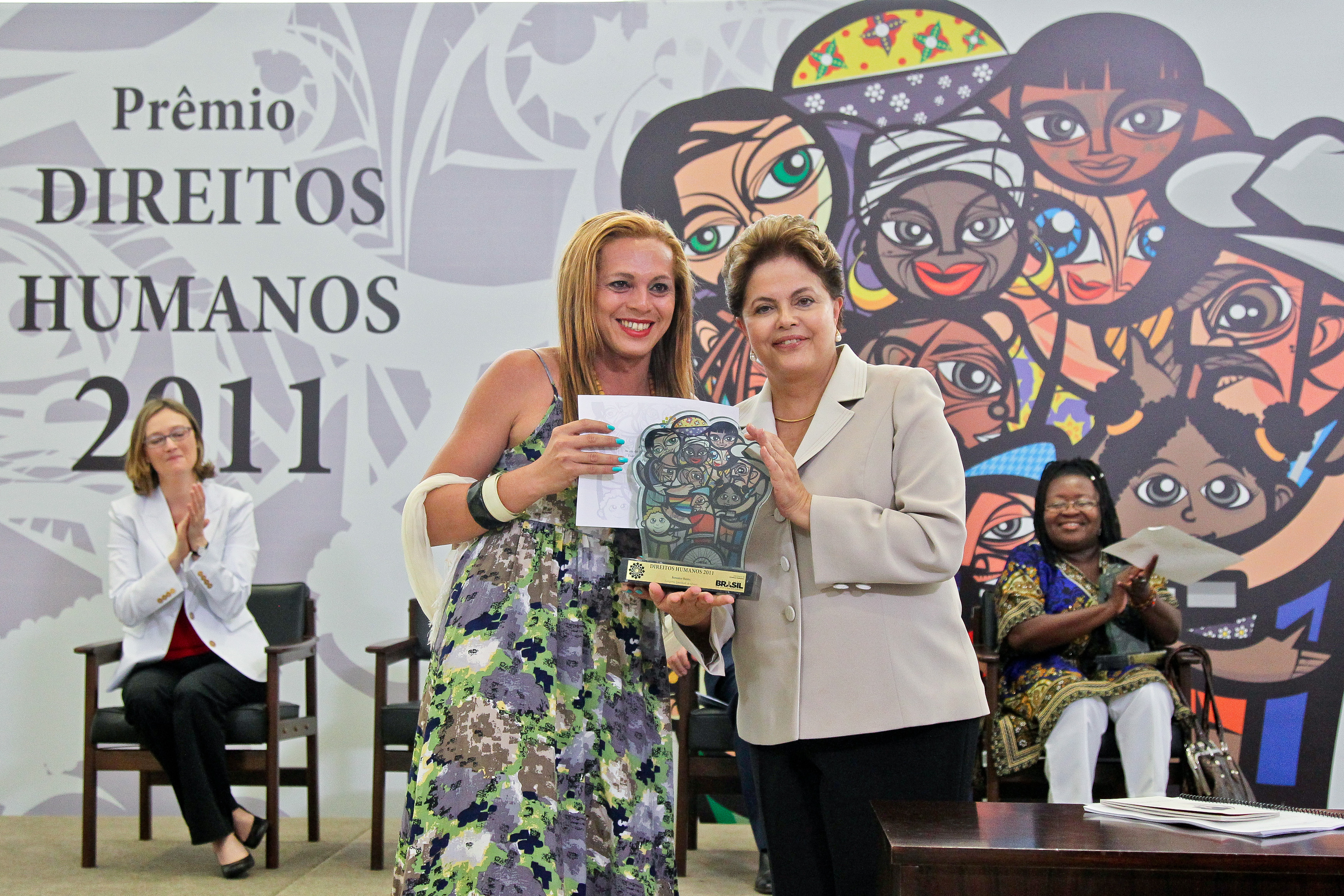
- Born: 14 March 1981; Ceará-Mirim, Brazil
- Died: 13 November 2018 (aged 37); Natal, Rio Grande do Norte
- Education: Federal University of Rio Grande do Norte
- Occupations: Historian; professor; researcher

Leilane Assunção (Ceará-Mirim, 14 March 1981 – Natal, 13 November 2018) was a historian, university professor, feminist, anti-prohibitionist and human rights activist. She is considered the first transgender woman to hold a professorship at a Brazilian university. She held a doctorate in Social Sciences from the Federal University of Rio Grande do Norte (UFRN) and advocated for LGBTQ rights, especially transgender rights.

== Biography ==
Leilane Assunção enrolled at the Federal University of Rio Grande do Norte (UFRN) to study History, where she underwent gender transition at age 24. However, her chosen name was not recognized by the institution until 2011, leading her to file lawsuits against the university itself.

With a degree in History, Leilane completed her master's and doctoral degrees in Social Sciences at UFRN, specializing in research on contemporary Brazil, the arts, and gender issues. In addition, she was a substitute professor at the same institution, where she worked until the end of her contract.

=== Activism ===
In addition to her academic career, Leilane was a human rights activist, primarily for LGBTQ rights. She represented Professor Berenice Bento in receiving the National Human Rights Award in 2011, and is considered an important figure in the history of transgender people in Brazil. She was also one of the founders of the anti-prohibitionist debate series and the Marijuana March in Natal, advocating for the decriminalization of drugs.

She annually celebrated Natal dos sem Natal (lit. 'Christmas for the Christmasless'), a celebration aimed at LGBTQ people who faced family rejection.

== Awards and homages ==
In 2011, she received the Dr. Berenice Bento Human Rights Award in the Gender Equality category from then-President Dilma Rousseff for defending transgender rights. She has received acknowledgments in master's theses, books, and scientific publications.

In 2023, councilwoman Brisa Bracchi proposed the creation of the Leilane Assunção Commendation, for those who stand out in promoting LGBTQ rights in Natal. In 2024, the Natal City Council approved the creation of the Leilane Assunção Commendation.

In her honor, collectives and organizations bearing her name have been created, such as the Coletivo LGBT+ Leilane Assunção in Natal and the Coletivo Leilane Assunção, linked to the Institute of Philosophy and Human Sciences (IFCH) at Unicamp.

== Death ==
Leilane Assunção died at age 37, a victim of an infection caused by a fungus, after 30 days hospitalized at Giselda Trigueiro Hospital, in Natal.
