= Mateus =

Mateus may refer to:

- Mateus, a historical civil parish in the Vila Real municipality of Portugal
- Mateus (wine), a brand of wine produced in the Vila Real municipality of Portugal
- Mateus Palace, a palace in the above civil parish, built by the winery family
- Mateus (name), Portuguese given name and surname
- Jorge & Mateus, musical duo
- Mateus (footballer, born April 1983), Mateus Versolato Júnior, Brazilian football goalkeeper
- Mateus (footballer, born June 1983), Mateus Alonso Honorio, Brazilian football defender
- Mateus (footballer, born 1987), Mateus de Oliveira Barbosa, Brazilian football defensive midfielder
- Mateus (footballer, born 1994), Mateus dos Santos Castro, Brazilian football winger
- Mateus (footballer, born 1999), Mateus Rodrigues dos Santos, Brazilian football defender

== See also ==
- São Mateus (disambiguation)
- Matthew (name)
