= Alvim, Sarpsborg =

Village in Norway

Coordinates: 59°16′35.58″N 11°5′1.33″E

Alvim is a village of Sarpsborg, Norway.
