= Álvares =

Álvares, sometimes Alvares, is a Portuguese and Galician surname, originally a patronymic meaning Son of Álvaro. Notable people with the name include:

- Ana Ida Alvares (born 1965), Brazilian volleyball player
- Chris Alvares (1901–1994), Surinamese classical musician and composer
- Élcio Álvares (1932–2016), Brazilian politician
- Francisco Álvares (1465–1541), Portuguese missionary and explorer
- João Álvares Fagundes (active in 1521), Portuguese explorer
- Jorge Álvares (died 1521), Portuguese explorer
- Mara Alvares (born 1948), Brazilian artist
- Nuno Álvares Pereira (1360–1431), Portuguese general and constable of Portugal
- Pedro Álvares Cabral (about 1467 – about 1520), Portuguese navigator and explorer, discoverer of Brazil

== See also ==
- Alvarez (disambiguation), The anglicization of Álvarez
- Álvarez (surname), the Spanish variant of the surname
