= Botelho =

Botelho is a surname, or part of a combined surname. Notable people with the surname include:

- Abel Botelho (1855/6–1917), Portuguese military officer, diplomat and writer
- Bruce Botelho (born 1948), American attorney and politician in Alaska
- Carlos Botelho (1899–1982), Portuguese painter and cartoonist
- Carlos Botelho (1855–1947), Brazilian minister
- João Botelho (born 1949), Portuguese film director
- Jordan Botelho (born 2001), American football player
- Júlio Botelho (1929–2003), also known as Julinho, Brazilian footballer
- Martiniano Ferreira Botelho, Portuguese doctor, politician and philanthropist
- Mauricio Botelho, former chairman of Embraer
- Poliana Botelho (born 1988), Brazilian mixed martial artist
- Rogério Márcio Botelho (born 1979), Brazilian footballer
- Leandro Botelho, Brazilian actor

People with the combined surname:

- José Maria Botelho de Vasconcelos, Angolan politician and government minister
- Júlio Botelho Moniz (1900–1970), Portuguese military officer and politician
- Pedro Roberto Silva Botelho (born 1989), Portuguese footballer
- Camilo Ferreira Botelho Castelo Branco (1825-1890), Portuguese writer
