= Alvarez =

Álvarez or Álvares may refer to:

== People ==
- Álvarez (surname), Spanish surname

== Places ==
- Alvares (river), a river in northern Spain
- Alvares (ski resort), in Iran
- Alvares, Iran
- Alvares, Portugal
- Álvarez, Santa Fe, a town in the province of Santa Fe, Argentina
- Álvarez, Tamaulipas, Mexico
- Alvarez Glacier, Antarctica
- General Mariano Alvarez, Cavite, Philippines
- Los Alvarez, Texas, US
- 3581 Alvarez, an asteroid

== Other uses ==
- Alvarez (Gotham), a character in the TV series Gotham
- Manny Alvarez, a character in The Last of Us Part II
- Alvarez Guitars, an acoustic guitar manufacturer
- "Alvarez", a song by the band Funeral for a Friend
- "Uncle Alvarez", a song by Liz Phair

== See also ==
- Álvares, a Portuguese and Galician surname
- Alvarez' syndrome, a medical disorder
