= Kamares =

Kamares (Greek: Καμάρες, "arches") may refer to the following places:

in Cyprus:

- the Kamares aqueduct in Larnaca

in Greece:

- Kamares, Achaea, a town in the northern part of Achaea
- Kamares, Crete, a village in the southern part of the Heraklion regional unit, Crete
- Kamares, Sifnos, a village on the island of Sifnos
- Kamares, Laconia, a village in the municipal unit Gytheio, Laconia
- the Kavala aqueduct, popularly known as Kamares

in Turkey:

- the Greek name for the village at the site of the ancient city of Parium
