= Kathy Andrade =

Salvadoran-American activist (1932–2021)

Kathy Andrade (8 July 1932 – 2 July 2021) was a Salvadoran-American union activist.

== Early life and family ==
Andrade was born as Enriqueta Mixco on July 8, 1932, in Santa Ana, El Salvador. Her father died before her birth, and she spent much of her childhood in Guatemala due to political unrest. She returned to El Salvador in the 1940s and married, taking her husband's surname. The couple immigrated to the United States in 1949, but soon after her husband died of cancer.

Andrade met her second husband, Jorge Colon, while representing El Salvador in a cultural pageant. She lived in the Penn South housing development in Manhattan, sponsored by the ILGWU.

== Career ==
Andrade began her career in the early 1950s working in factories, first in an airplane parts plant and later in the garment industry. She joined labor unions and rose to prominence, first working as a union organizer and later as the Education Director for Local 23-25 of the International Ladies Garment Workers Union (ILGWU). She became an American citizen in the late 1950s.

Andrade was an advocate for undocumented workers within the labor movement. She worked closely with union leaders to develop policies supporting immigrant rights and amnesty. She also organized various educational programs for union members, supporting their paths to citizenship. She also developed the union's collaboration with other social justice movements, notably civil rights organizations.

Andrade continued to advocate for immigrant rights after her retirement from the ILGWU in 1995.

== Awards and recognition ==
- Clara Lemlich Award for Social Activism
