= Marcia Andrade Braga =

Brazilian military officer

Marcia Andrade Braga is a Brazilian military officer and current blue helmet part of the United Nations (UN) Mission in the Central African Republic (MINUSCA).

Braga served as Military Gender Advisor at MINUSCA Headquarters between April 2018 and April 2019, where she promoted mixed teams of men and women to conduct community-based patrols around the country. Called “Engagement Teams", they were able to gather critical information to help the mission understand the necessities of men, women, and children. She was bestowed with the UN Military Gender Advocate of the Year Award during the 2019 Peacekeeping Ministerial conference at the General Assembly by Secretary-General António Guterres for her service, the highest honor dedicated to those working in this area at the UN. Andrade was succeeded by navy officer Carla Monteiro de Castro Araújo, who is Brazilian as well.
