= Bandeira (surname) =

Bandeira is a Portuguese surname. Notable people with the surname include:

- Alda Bandeira (born 1949), politician in São Tomé and Príncipe
- Bárbara Bandeira (born 2001), Portuguese pop singer
- Gabriel Bandeira (born 1999), Brazilian Paralympic swimmer
- Manuel Bandeira (1886–1968), Brazilian poet, literary critic and translator
- Moniz Bandeira (born 1935), Brazilian writer, professor, political scientist, historian and poet
- Pedro Bandeira (born 1942), Brazilian children's author
- Washington Bandeira (born 1984), Brazilian politician
