= Rebelo =

Rebelo or Rebello is a Portuguese surname, also found in people with Portuguese ancestry or of Portuguese descent. This surname is mainly found in Portugal along with a very small distribution among Portuguese descendants in former Portuguese colonies like Brazil, India (Luso-Indians mainly in Goa), Angola, Mozambique and other places. In India, most people from the former Estado da Índia took the anglicised spelling of the surname- "Rebello", but many, especially those of Portuguese descent, kept the original spelling 'Rebelo'.

Notable people with the surname include:

- Aldo Rebelo (born 1956), Brazilian politician
- Andre Rebelo (also known as Typical Gamer) (born 1992), Canadian YouTuber
- Baltasar Rebelo de Sousa (1921–2001), Portuguese politician and medicine professor
- François Rebello (born 1970), Canadian politician
- Henry Rebello (1928–2013), Indian field athlete
- Jason Rebello (born 1969), British jazz pianist
- João Lourenço Rebelo (1610-1655), Portuguese court composer to king John IV of Portugal
- Joaquim Rebelo (born 1961), Portuguese football player
- José Adriano Pequito Rebelo (1892-1983), Portuguese writer, politician and aviator
- Jose d'Avellar Rebello (c.1600–1657), Spanish historical painter
- Leon Rebello, Australian politician
- Mabel Rebello (born 1950), Indian politician
- Marcelo Rebelo de Sousa (born 1948), Portuguese politician, law professor, former journalist, political analyst and 20th President of Portugal
- Paulo Jorge Rebelo Duarte (born 1969), Portuguese football manager
- Princeton Rebello (born 1999), Indian football player
- Stephen Rebello (20th and 21st century), United States screenwriter
