= Rodrigo Agostinho =

Brazilian politician (born 1977)

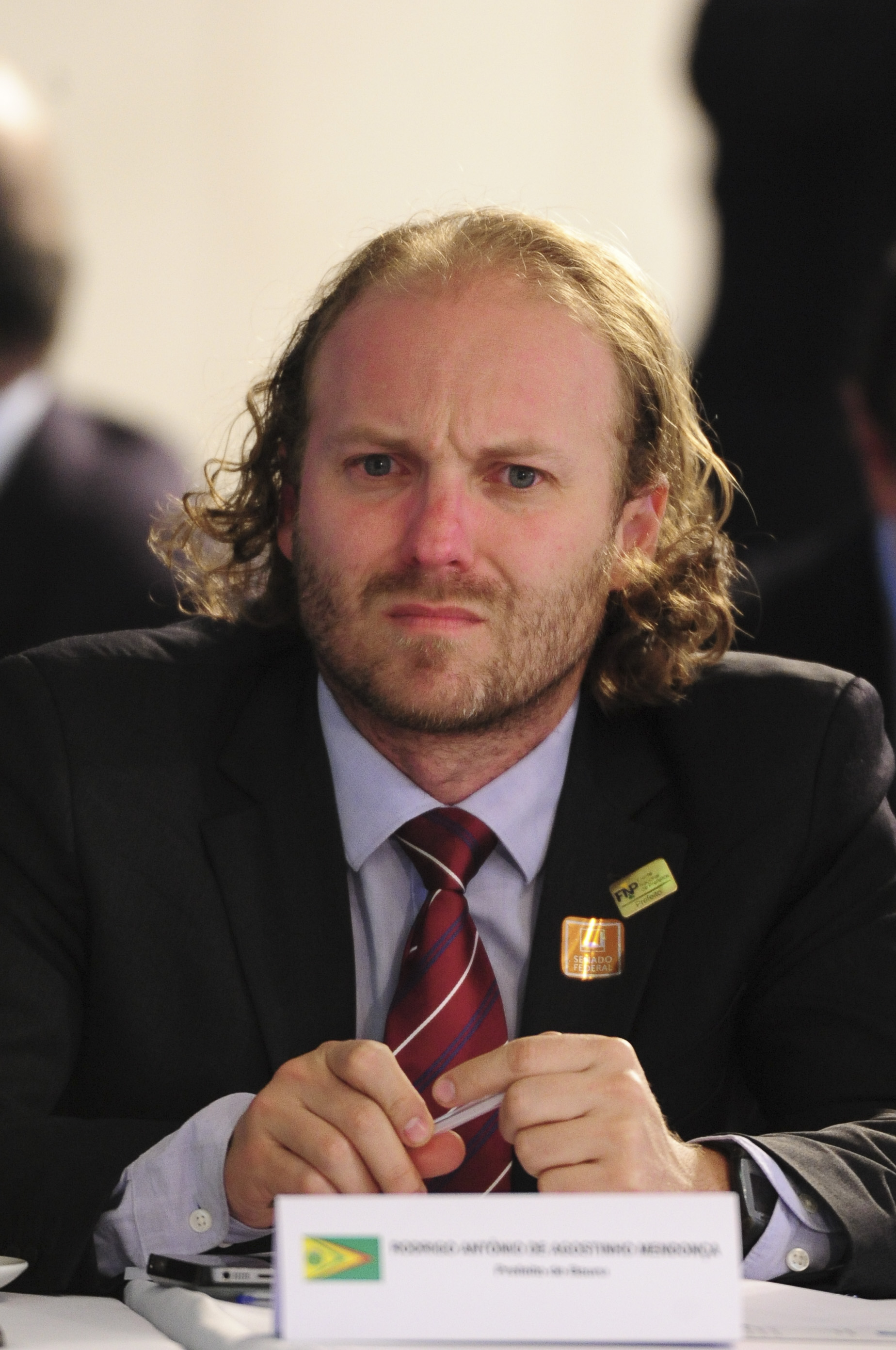
- Agostinho in 2015

Member of the Chamber of Deputies
- In office 1 February 2019 – 31 January 2023
- Constituency: São Paulo

Personal details
- Born: 12 December 1977 (age 48)
- Party: Brazilian Socialist Party (since 2018)

Rodrigo Antônio de Agostinho Mendonça (born 12 December 1977) is a Brazilian politician serving as president of the Brazilian Institute of Environment and Renewable Natural Resources since 2023. From 2019 to 2023, he was a member of the Chamber of Deputies. From 2009 to 2016, he served as mayor of Bauru.
