= Couto =

Couto may refer to:

== Surname ==
Couto [ˈko(w)tu] is a common surname in the Galician and Portuguese language, namely in Portugal, Galicia and Brazil. Its meaning is game reservation or feudal land.

- André Couto (born 1976), Portuguese/Macanese racing driver
- Fernando Couto (born 1969), Portuguese football player
- Grant Andrew DeCouto (born 1995), American producer
- Mia Couto (born 1955), Mozambican writer
- Maria Aurora Couto, Goan Catholic writer, historian and educationalist
- Maria do Couto Maia-Lopes (1890-2005), longest-lived person to be documented in Portugal
- Yana Couto (born 1992), Polish composer and pianist

== Places ==
=== Portugal ===
- Couto (Arcos de Valdevez), Arcos de Valdevez
- Couto (Barcelos), Barcelos
- Couto, Resendes do Ponta Delgada
- Couto (Santa Cristina), Santo Tirso
- Couto (São Miguel), Santo Tirso
- Couto de Baixo, Viseu
- Couto de Cima, Viseu
- Couto de Esteves, Sever do Vouga
- Couto do Mosteiro, Santa Comba Dão

=== Spain ===
- Couto, Abegondo, Galicia
- Couto, Gomesende, Galicia
- Couto, Pantón, Galicia
- Couto de Abaixo, Vigo, Galicia
- Couto de Riba, Alfoz, Galicia

=== Brazil ===
- Couto de Magalhaes de Minas, Minas Gerais
