= Sosa (surname) =

Sosa is a Spanish surname of Portuguese and Galician origin, originating from the Portuguese Sousa. The Sousa Family is of noble and Visigoth origin. Portuguese people brought the Sousa surname to Galicia, and from there it spread in the former Spanish colonies. Sometimes, both variants are used to refer to the same person or family in old texts.

The primitive Coat of Arms of one specific Sousa Family.

Notable people with the surname include:

- Alcides Sosa (1944–2026), Paraguayan footballer
- Ángela Sosa (born 1993), Spanish footballer
- Antonieta Sosa (born 1940), Venezuelan-American performance artist
- Arlenis Sosa (born 1989), Dominican model
- Arturo Sosa (born 1948), Venezuelan Superior General of the Jesuit order
- Borna Sosa (born 1998), Croatian footballer
- Clara Sosa (born 1993), Paraguayan model, television personality and beauty queen
- Dan Sosa Jr. (1924–2016), justice of the New Mexico Supreme Court
- David Sosa, American philosopher
- Édgar Sosa, multiple people
- Edmundo Sosa (born 1996), Panamanian baseball player
- Elías Sosa (born 1950), Dominican baseball player
- Ernest Sosa (born 1940), Cuban-American philosopher
- Flavio Sosa (born 1964), Mexican politician
- Francisco Sosa (20th century), Paraguayan footballer who played in the 1950 FIFA World Cup
- Francisco Sosa (bishop) (died 1520), Bishop of Almería
- Franco Sosa, multiple people
- Gilberto Sosa (born 1960), Mexican boxer
- Henry Sosa (born 1985), Dominican baseball player
- Iván Sosa (born 1997), Colombian cyclist
- Jason Sosa (born 1988), Puerto Rican-American boxer
- Jerónimo de Sosa (17th century), Spanish friar and genealogist
- Jorge Sosa, multiple people
- José Ernesto Sosa (born 1985), Argentine footballer
- José Romulo Sosa Ortiz (1948–2019), Mexican singer known as José José
- Julio Sosa (guitarist), Argentine guitarist
- Julio Sosa (1926–1964), Uruguayan tango singer
- Lenyn Sosa (born 2000), Venezuelan professional baseball infielder
- Lucía Sosa, multiple people
- Manuel Sosa, multiple people
- Mercedes Sosa (1935–2009), Argentine singer
- Omar Sosa (born 1965), Cuban jazz pianist
- Osvaldo Sosa (1945–2020), Argentine footballer and manager
- Patricia Sosa (born 1956), Argentine singer
- Porfirio Lobo Sosa (born 1947), Honduran politician
- Ramón Sosa (born 1999), Paraguayan footballer
- Richard Sosa Zapata (born 1972), Uruguayan footballer
- Roberto Sosa, multiple people
- Rubén Sosa (born 1966), Uruguayan footballer
- Sammy Sosa (born 1968), Dominican baseball player
- Santiago Sosa (born 1999), Argentine footballer
- Sebastián Sosa (born 1986), Uruguayan footballer
- Tomás Méndez Sosa (1927–1995), Mexican singer and composer
- Victoriano Sosa (born 1974), Dominican boxer

== See also ==
- Sosa (disambiguation)
