= Sousa (surname) =

Origin
- Meaning: toponymic (from the Sousa River)
- Region of origin: Portugal

Other names
- Variant forms: "de Sousa", "d'Sousa", "e Sousa" "de Souza", "d'Souza", "e Souza"

Sousa, Souza (/ˈsuːzə/ SOO-zə, Portuguese: [ˈso(w)zɐ]) is a common Portuguese-language surname, especially in Portugal, Brazil, East Timor, India (among Catholics in Goa, Mumbai, Mangaluru and Fort Kochi), and Galicia. In Africa, the name is common in former Portuguese colonies, especially among people who have some Portuguese and Brazilian roots in Ghana, Togo, Benin, Nigeria, Angola, São Tomé and Príncipe, Cape Verde, Guinea-Bissau, and Mozambique.

== Etymology and history ==
The name comes from the Sousa River in northern Portugal. Sousa derives from Latin: saxa (stone, pebble), and the first man who used the surname was the noble of Visigoth origin Egas Gomes de Sousa. Sometimes the spelling is in the archaic form Souza. Other variant forms include: "de Sousa", "d'Sousa", "e Sousa", "de Souza", "d'Souza", "e Souza". The Galician equivalent of this surname is Sosa and it was brought to Galicia (Spain) by the Portuguese.

During the colonial era, the Portuguese built forts along Brazilian and West African coastal areas for trade, many of which were later used for the slave trade. They also had children with local women, and the children were given their fathers' last names.

Some Afro-Brazilians who returned to Africa also carry this last name. Among those are the descendants of Francisco Félix de Sousa, a white Portuguese-Brazilian man from Salvador, Bahia, in Brazil, who founded the De Souza family on the West African coast. He was once the richest man in the region due to his involvement in the slave trade.

== People with the surname Sousa or variants ==
=== Scientists, academics and technologists ===
- Clara Sousa-Silva, Astrochemist and science communicator
- Francisco D'Souza (born 1968), Indian American entrepreneur and businessman
- Gypsyamber D'Souza, American epidemiologist
- Marcelo Damy de Souza Santos (1914–2009), Brazilian physicist
- Octávio Tarquínio de Sousa (1889–1959), Brazilian historian and author
- Raissa D'Souza (born 1969), American theoretical physicist and computer scientist
- Ronald Bon de Sousa Pernes (born 1940), Canadian philosopher
- Tammie Souza (Tammara J. Souza, fl. from 1996), American meteorologist
- Teotónio de Souza (1947–2019), Indian historian

=== Visual artists ===
- Amadeo de Souza-Cardoso (1887–1918), Portuguese painter
- Aurélia de Souza (1867–1922), Portuguese painter
- F. N. Souza (1924–2002), British painter from Goa
- Mauricio de Sousa (born 1935), Brazilian comic book artist
- Remo D'Souza (born 1974), Indian dancer, choreographer, actor and film director
- Solomon Souza (born 1993), Israeli artist, grandson of Francis Newton Souza
- Sofia Martins de Sousa (1870–1960), Portuguese painter
- Teresa Nunes Alves de Sousa (born 1979), Portuguese artist

=== Actors and filmmakers ===
- Andria D'Souza (born 1986), Indian television actress
- Edward de Souza (born 1932), British actor
- Genelia D'Souza (born 1987), Indian actress
- Karla Souza (born 1985), Mexican actress
- Krystle D'Souza (born 1990), Indian television actress
- Marjorie de Sousa (born 1980), Venezuelan actress and model
- Waluscha De Sousa (born 1979), Indian actress and model
- Steven E. de Souza (born 1947), American producer, director and screenwriter
- Sebastian de Souza (born 1993), British actor

=== Entrepreneurs ===
- Aron D'Souza, Australian businessman
- Francis deSouza (born 1970), American entrepreneur and business executive.
- Francisco Félix de Souza (1754–1849), Portuguese-Brazilian slave trader
- Osmel Sousa (born 1946), Cuban-Venezuelan beauty pageant entrepreneur

=== Musicians, singers and composers ===
- Carmen Souza (born 1981), Portuguese-born singer and songwriter of Cape Verde
- Chris de Souza (born 1943), British classical music composer
- Gena Desouza (born 1997), Thai singer and actress
- Indigo de Souza (born 1996), American singer
- João de Sousa Carvalho (1745–1798), Portuguese composer of Baroque operas
- John Philip Sousa (1854–1932), American composer of marches
- Luciana Souza (born 1966), Brazilian singer
- Nikhil D'Souza (born 1981), Indian-born singer, songwriter and guitarist
- Raul de Souza (1934–2021), Brazilian trombonist
- Steve "Zetro" Souza (born 1964), American thrash metal singer

=== Writers and journalists ===
- Adelaide Filleul, Marquise de Souza-Botelho (1761–1836), French novelist
- Amílcar de Sousa (1876–1940), Portuguese doctor and author of health books
- Emma DeSouza, Irish writer, political commentator, campaigner, and peacebuilder
- Christovão Falcão (c. 1512 – c. 1557), a.k.a. Christovão de Sousa Falcão, Portuguese poet
- Dinesh D'Souza (born 1961), Indian-American conservative political commentator, filmmaker and author
- Francis D'Souza, Canadian television executive and broadcaster
- Henrique "Henfil" de Souza Filho (1944–1988), Brazilian cartoonist, caricaturist, journalist and writer
- José de Sousa Saramago (1922–2010), Portuguese novelist, Prémio Camões and Nobel Prize in Literature
- Júlio César de Mello e Souza (1895–1974), Brazilian writer and mathematics professor; used the pen name Malba Tahan
- Luís de Sousa (1555–1632), Portuguese monk and writer
- Manuel de Faria e Sousa (1590–1649), Portuguese historian and poet
- Márcio Souza (1946–2024), Brazilian novelist, essayist and playwright
- Maria Peregrina de Souza (1809–1894), Portuguese novelist, poet and folklorist
- Na D'Souza (1937–2025), Indian novelist and Kannada language writer
- Noémia de Sousa (1926–2003), Mozambican journalist and poet
- Ovídio de Sousa Martins (1928–1999), Cape Verdean poet
- Pete Souza (born 1954), American photojournalist, Chief Official White House photographer
- Tony D'Souza, American novelist, journalist and essayist

=== Political figures ===
- Anabela Sousa Rodrigues (born 1972), Portuguese politician and psychologist
- Aristides de Sousa Mendes (1885–1954), Portuguese diplomat
- Charles Sousa (born 1958), Canadian politician, Minister of Finance for Ontario from 2007
- Christopher de Souza (born 1976), Singaporean Member of Parliament
- Dona Ana de Sousa, a.k.a. Ngola Ann Nzinga Mbande (c. 1583–1663), Angolan queen
- Fitz de Souza (1929–2020), Kenyan lawyer and politician
- Frances D'Souza, Baroness D'Souza (born 1944), British scientist and former Lord Speaker of the House of Lords
- Francis D'Souza (1954–2019), Indian politician, Deputy Chief Minister of Goa
- Herbert de Souza (1935–1997), Brazilian sociologist, politician and activist
- Jerónimo de Sousa (born 1947), Portuguese politician, General Secretary of the Communist Party
- Jose Philip D'Souza, Indian politician
- José Sócrates Carvalho Pinto de Sousa (born 1957), Portuguese politician and former Prime Minister of Portugal
- Luis Martins de Souza Dantas (1876–1954), Brazilian diplomat
- Marcelo Rebelo de Sousa (born 1948), Portuguese politician, currently President of Portugal
- Márcio de Souza e Mello (1906–1991), Brazilian former air force general and member of ruling junta
- Martim Afonso de Sousa (c. 1500–1571), Portuguese explorer and first Royal Governor of Brazil
- Paulo Renato Souza (1945–2011), Brazilian economist and politician
- Pedro Lopes de Sousa (? - 1594), Portuguese nobleman and first governor of Portuguese Ceylon
- Sabrina De Sousa (born c. 1956), former American diplomat and ex-CIA operative
- Sérgio Sousa Pinto (born 1972), Portuguese politician, Member of the European Parliament
- Taíssa Sousa (born 1989), Brazilian politician
- Tomé de Sousa (1503–1579), Portuguese nobleman and first governor-general of Brazil
- Washington Luís Pereira de Sousa (1869–1957), last president of the First Brazilian Republic
- Boaventura de Sousa Santos (born 1940), economist and university teacher known for his work on the World Social Forum and on Marxism

=== Athletes ===
- Abigail Conceição de Souza (1921–2007), Brazilian footballer
- Adrian D'Souza (born 1984), Indian field hockey player
- Adriano de Souza (born 1987), Brazilian footballer
- Agate de Sousa (born 2000), Portuguese long jumper
- Alan Goncalves Sousa (born 1997), Brazilian footballer
- Alexsandro de Souza (born 1977), Brazilian footballer
- Antao D'Souza (born 1939), Pakistani cricketer
- Artur de Sousa Pinga (1909–1963), Portuguese footballer and coach
- Cássio Alessandro de Souza (born 1986), Brazilian footballer
- Claudemir de Souza (born 1988), Brazilian footballer
- Cristiano Pereira de Souza (born 1977), Brazilian footballer
- Darius D'Souza (born 1989), Canadian cricketer
- Deivid de Souza (born 1979), Brazilian footballer
- Douglas Costa de Souza (born 1990), better known as Douglas Costa, Brazilian footballer
- Edson Edmar Dias de Souza, a.k.a. Mateus Paraná (born 1987), Brazilian footballer
- Érika de Souza (1982), Brazilian basketball player
- Fábio de Souza a.k.a. Fabinho (born 1975), Brazilian footballer
- Frederico Sousa (born 1978), Portuguese rugby player
- Gesias Calvancante Souza a.k.a. JZ Calvan (born 1983), Brazilian MMA fighter
- Givanildo Vieira de Souza a.k.a. Hulk (born 1986), Brazilian footballer
- Hélder Wander Sousa de Azevedo e Costa (born 1994), Portuguese footballer
- Hélia Souza (born 1970), Brazilian volleyball player
- Hudson de Souza (born 1977), Brazilian middle-distance runner
- Jenílson Ângelo de Souza a.k.a. Júnior (1973), Brazilian footballer
- João de Sousa (1924–2014), Portuguese rower
- João Sousa (born 1989), Portuguese tennis player
- Jorge Luiz Sousa a.k.a. Jorginho (born 1977), Brazilian footballer
- José Augusto Oliveira de Sousa (born 1974), Portuguese darts player
- José Sousa (born 1977), Portuguese footballer
- José Cristiano de Souza Júnior (born 1977), Brazilian footballer
- José Ivanaldo de Souza (born 1975), Brazilian footballer
- Kieren D'Souza (born 1993), Indian ultramarathon runner
- Marcelo de Souza (born 1975), Uruguayan footballer
- Marcelo de Souza Ramos (born 1978), Brazilian footballer
- Márcio Rafael Ferreira de Souza, a.k.a. Rafinha (born 1985), Brazilian footballer
- Marcus Vinicius de Souza, a.k.a. Marcus Vinicius (born 1984), Brazilian basketball player
- Marshall D'Souza (1941–2013), Pakistani-Canadian cricketer
- Nadson Rodrigues de Souza (born 1982), Brazilian footballer
- Paulo Manuel Carvalho de Sousa (born 1970), Portuguese former footballer
- Robert de Pinho de Souza a.k.a. Robert (born 1981), Brazilian footballer
- Robson de Souza a.k.a. Robinho (born 1984), Brazilian footballer
- Rodrigo de Souza Cardoso (born 1982), Brazilian footballer
- Romário de Souza Faria a.k.a. Romário (born 1966), Brazilian former footballer
- Ronaldo Souza dos Santos a.k.a. Jacaré (born 1979), Brazilian MMA fighter
- Sidney de Souza (athlete) (born 1966), Brazilian sprinter
- Sidney de Souza (equestrian) (born 1973), Brazilian equestrian
- Silvestre de Sousa (born 1980), Brazilian jockey
- Stephie D'Souza (1936–1998), Indian track-and-field athlete and hockey player
- Steven Souza Jr. (born 1989), American baseball player
- Tony DeSouza (born 1974), Peruvian wrestler
- Uênia Fernandes de Souza (born 1984), Brazilian racing cyclist
- Vágner Silva de Souza a.k.a. Vágner Love (born 1984), Brazilian footballer

=== Religious figures ===
- Albert D'Souza (born 1945), Indian Roman Catholic Bishop
- Aloysius Paul D'Souza (born 1941), Bishop of the Mangalore Diocese, India
- Basil Salvadore D'Souza (1926–1996), Bishop of the Mangalore Diocese, India
- Felipa de Souza (1556–1600), Portuguese-Brazilian lesbian convicted and tortured by the Inquisition
- Humberto Sousa Medeiros (1915–1983), Catholic Cardinal and Archbishop of Boston, Massachusetts
- James deSouza (1925–2016), Pakistani Roman Catholic priest
- João de Sousa (1647–1710), Archbishop of Lisbon, Portugal
- Norbert D'Souza, president of the All India Catholic Union during 1996–2000

=== Fictional characters ===
- Anna De Souza, in Emmerdale TV series
- Bianca DeSousa, in Degrassi: The Next Generation TV series
- Lady Christina de Souza, in an episode of the British TV series Doctor Who
- Daniel Sousa, in the Agent Carter TV series and the Agents of S.H.I.E.L.D. TV series.
- Donald De Souza, in Emmerdale TV series
- Etienne de Sousa, in Dead Man's Folly, a novel by Agatha Christie
- Madame Souza, in The Triplets of Belleville animated film
- Miles De Souza, in Emmerdale TV series
- Rodrigo De Souza, in Mozart in the Jungle TV series by Amazon
- Harry De Sousa, in "Mobland" TV Series

=== Other people ===
- André Ventura Sousa (born 2000), Portuguese chess master
- Darryl De Sousa (born 1964 or 1965), American police officer
- Lino Sousa Loureiro, 2025 Mulhouse stabbing attack victim
- Moise de Souza, Beninese construction engineer and traditional aristocrat, head of the De Souza family
- Dame Rachel de Souza (born 1968), British educationalist, and Children's Commissioner for England
- Maria José de Sousa Botelho (born in 1961), Portuguese American Professor of Language, Literacy & Culture, ethnographer

== See also ==
- Sosa (surname), the Spanish equivalent
