= Sosa =

Sosa may refer to:

== Name ==
- Sosa (surname)
- Alejandro "Alex" Sosa, fictional drug lord from the 1983 film Scarface
- Chief Keef (born 1995), American rapper Keith Farrelle Cozart, nicknamed Sosa
- Jerónimo de Sosa

== Places ==
- Sōsa, city in the Chiba prefecture, Japan
- Sosa, Germany, a town in the district of Aue-Schwarzenberg in Saxony
- Sosa, India, a village in Pithoragarh district, Uttarakhand
- Sosa, Indonesia, a sub-district in Padang Lawas, North Sumatra
- SoSA, Oklahoma City, an inner-city neighborhood in Oklahoma, U.S.
- Sosa, Portugal, a village in the municipality of Vagos

== Other uses ==
- Sosa station, a train station named after a district in Bucheon, South Korea
- Sosa v. Alvarez-Machain, United States Supreme Court case
- SOSA, initialism for State Opera of South Australia
- Security of Supply Arrangement (SOSA), bilateral US military arrangement
- Society of St. Andrew (SoSA), Methodist humanitarian organization

== See also ==
- Sousa (disambiguation)
