= Sousa =

Sousa may refer to:

== People ==
- Sousa (surname), including a list of people with the name and variants
  - John Philip Sousa (1854–1932), American composer of marches
- Sousa (Brazilian footballer), Van Basty Sousa e Silva, (born 1994), Brazilian football midfielder

== Places ==
- Sousa, Paraíba, Brazil
- Sousa River, Portugal

== Other uses ==
- Sousa, the genus of humpback dolphins
- Sousa Esporte Clube, a Brazilian football club
- Sousa family, a noble house of Portugal

== See also ==
- Souza (disambiguation)
- Susa (disambiguation)
- Suså (disambiguation)
- Sousaphone, a brass musical instrument in the tuba family associated with John Philip Sousa
- Sōsa District, Chiba, Japan
- Sousse, Sūsah, or Soussa, a city in Tunisia
- Susa, Libya, or Soussa
