= Suza =

Suza can refer to:

- Suza, Osijek-Baranja County, a settlement in Croatian Baranja
- Suza, Iran, a city on the Persian Gulf
- Suza Rural District, in Iran
- Sûza or Shire (Middle-earth), a region of J. R. R. Tolkien's fictional Middle-earth

== See also ==
- Susa (disambiguation)
