= Roberto Sosa =

Roberto Sosa may refer to:

- Roberto Sosa (poet) (1930–2011), Honduran author and poet
- Roberto Sosa (Argentine footballer) (born 1975), Argentine footballer
- Roberto Sosa (Uruguayan footballer) (born 1935), Uruguayan footballer

== See also ==
- Sosa (surname)
