= Hong Kong Dolphin Conservation Society =

Non-governmental organization

Hong Kong Dolphin Conservation Society 香港海豚保育學會
- Type: Non-governmental organisation, recognised as a charitable organisation, effective from 14 July 2005.
- Founded: December 2003
- Headquarters: Hong Kong
- Website: www.hkdcs.org

The Hong Kong Dolphin Conservation Society (HKDCS) (Traditional Chinese: 香港海豚保育學會) is a non-governmental organisation that is dedicated to the conservation of whales, and dolphins and porpoises in Hong Kong. Founded in December 2003, its mission is to protect whales and dolphins through scientific research and public education.

To promote concern and increase awareness of the unfortunate circumstances of whales and dolphins, the HKDCS has been involved in various fields including carrying out research, offering related education to school children, providing volunteers a chance to join as research interns, and organising forums for dolphin-lovers which also serves as a social gathering for like-minded individuals. HKDCS has an ongoing member recruitment programme since 2003.

== Mission ==
To protect local cetaceans residing in Hong Kong waters, through scientific research and public education.

As the general public in Hong Kong knows little about these creatures, the HKDCS believes local cetaceans have not received sufficient protection from the locals yet. The HKDCS deems that in order for local cetaceans to be relieved from this quandary and to be effectively protected in the long run, the knowledge of the general public on cetaceans in Hong Kong and around the world should be raised.

The HKDCS aims to:

- Raise public awareness on: The biology and conservation of the dolphins in Hong Kong – namely the Sousa chinensis (Chinese white dolphin), finless porpoises in Hong Kong and cetaceans in other parts of the world; the preservation of dolphins and their habitats in Hong Kong; and the impacts to dolphins from dolphin-watching activities and the importance of raising the standard of the dolphin-watching industry in Hong Kong
- Conduct scientific research on wild dolphins in Hong Kong and nearby regions like China and Taiwan
- Educate school children on the importance of dolphin conservation
- Offer opportunities for internship in the research department and volunteers to participate in the conservation of the local cetaceans
- Provide a forum for dolphin-lovers to gather, interact and share dolphin-watching and some global hot issues about dolphins.

== Research work ==
The HKDCS carries out extensive research to better understand and monitor the situation of dolphins and their habitats within the vicinity of Hong Kong. The society stresses that research should be conducted on a yearly basis at least, so that information about the dolphin population can be updated regularly. Decisions based on these information can then be made with confidence.

Research projects include:

=== Monitoring Chinese white dolphins and finless porpoises ===
The red dots are locations where Chinese white dolphins were found in Hong Kong.

The main targets of HKDCS's monitoring work are the Chinese white dolphins (Sousa chinensis), and the finless porpoises (Neophocaena phocaenoides). At least 1,400 Chinese white dolphins are said to be living in this region, with about 300 alone in Hong Kong waters; but their population, temporal and spatial distribution, their use of habitat places and ranging patterns have not yet been studied adequately. This is especially so for finless porpoises as they are known to be more elusive, and therefore harder to spot at sea.

HKDCS is one organisation that carries out research on Chinese white dolphins in Hong Kong waters. Monitoring work of Chinese white dolphins and finless porpoises are normally carried out by vessel surveys, helicopter surveys and the use of photo-identification.

Vessel surveys are used mainly for the routine monitoring of the distribution and abundance of the local dolphin population.

Helicopter surveys are used mainly to search for dolphins in a large area within a relatively short period of time. When researchers sight a group of dolphins, the time, location and abundance are recorded.

Helicopter surveys can provide better and more comprehensive information on the distribution of dolphins in Hong Kong as compared to vessel survey and land-based observation.

Photo-identification is used to identify individual cetaceans. The identifying features include permanent external characteristics on the body, such as nicks, dorsal scars or marks. Currently, over 260 individual dolphins have been identified in Hong Kong waters and the Pearl River Estuary. The photographic documentations of individual humpback dolphins will be used to study their home range and movement patterns. The data are also used to clarify some life history parameters to estimate dolphin population through mark/recapture analysis.

=== Executing joint conservation of Chinese white dolphins in Taiwan ===
The HKDCS plans to work with the FormosaCetus Research and Conservation Group to conduct a joint conservation programme on Chinese white dolphins in Taiwanese waters. Until 2002, there was little evidence that the coastal waters of Taiwan were populated with any Chinese white dolphin. A discovery that year revealed a sizeable population of these creatures. As a result of the discovery, the Chinese white dolphin is now placed at the highest level of protection under Taiwan's Wildlife Conservation Law.

Coastal pollution accruing from industrial and human sewage waste and the cumulative impacts of coastal development would mean tainting the water which the dolphins live in. Before issuing protection measures and drawing up conservation programmes, the impacts that these threats on dolphins have to be first addressed and understood.

=== Performing land-based observation on dolphin-watching activities ===
Most land-based observations in Hong Kong take place in Sha Chau and Lung Kwu Chau Marine Park. This type of far-off observation is useful as it provides an elevated pedestal with which to view and survey the entire study area. This allows an unobstructed view of the whole scene and environment, which gives the observer the chance to observe interactions between dolphins, and also between dolphins and passing boats. Furthermore, this observation does not disturb the dolphins in any way and therefore will not affect their usual behaviour.

=== Conducting exploratory surveys along the Guangdong province coastline ===
Despite having intensive research efforts conducted in Hong Kong's territorial portion of the Pearl River Estuary in the preceding seven years, only a years' worth of effort was dedicated to acquiring data about the rest of the estuary. The contrasting surveillance effort between the Hong Kong and Mainland Chinese waters has hindered the general understanding of the entire Pearl River Estuary population of Chinese white dolphins.

The long-term aims of the exploratory surveys are to estimate the population of the Chinese white dolphin in the PRE and to study the spatial and temporal patterns of their distribution and habitats. The HKDCS also wishes to assess the threats faced by dolphins within the area, and to provide suggestions on the conservation and management of the Chinese white dolphin to the Guangdong authorities.

The HKDCS maintains that additional dolphin surveys in the rest of the Guangdong coastline is urgently needed. Data concerning their trends in abundance, distribution, habitat use, social organisation, life history, mortality rates and causes of Chinese white dolphins are to be acquired.

=== Studying cetaceans in Matzu Island with FormosaCetus ===
The Matzu Islands, a small group island off Taiwan in the East China Sea, has found to be home to some cetaceans as well. Little is known about their distribution and population characteristics, hence sparking off HKDCS' research programme with Formosa Cetus.

=== Researching internship programme ===
The HKDCS also holds an internship programme for local tertiary students, who are majoring in general biology, environmental science and/or other relevant fields, during the summer and also all year round. Student interns will be able to help in a variety of research aspects; including the observation of impacts on Chinese white dolphins brought about by dolphin-watching activities, conducting boat surveys as well as studying about vessel effects on finless porpoises.

== Activities ==
=== Past activities ===
Chinese white dolphin.

The HKDCS organises a wide range of activities that can be categorised into the following two groups:

- Study-based: Regular reef checks, dolphin research trips, dolphin talks, watching tours, and porpoise hikes
- Community-based: Dolphin Ambassador Programme, Chinese White Dolphin Carnival, game booths, painting & drawing competition, dolphin art competition, "Little Dolphin Journalist", Little Dolphin Parent-Child Workshops and exhibitions (Tsing Yi Maritime Square Exhibition, Cityplaza Exhibition) etc.

=== Latest activities ===
- Little Dolphin Parent-child Workshop

The HKDCS financed the "Environmental & Conservation Fund" and "Environmental Campaign Committee", and worked hand-in-hand with the Parent-Teacher Associations of participating schools, resulting in the latest creation of workshops for primary school students which will be held from September 2006 to December 2007. The HKDCS hopes to convey the message of the conservation of dolphins, through tailor-made activities for the primary school kids and their parents, such as distributing educational booklets and chessboards with the theme of Hong Kong dolphins and making paper-clay models of dolphins etc.

- Whale & Dolphin Exhibition at Cityplaza, Taikoo Shing

The large scale exhibition "Get close with Chinese White Dolphin", was jointly held by the HKDCS and the Cityplaza.

- Dolphin slaughter in Taiji, Japan

There has recently been a protest against the slaughtering of dolphins and small whales within Japanese waters. It is estimated that more than a total of 400,000 cetaceans have been killed. The HKDCS called upon the public to support and join the campaign protesting against this massacre. The society also sent a letter to the Consulate-General of Japan regarding the issue.

== Dolphin-conservation-related societies or organisations in Hong Kong ==
=== Agriculture, Fisheries and Conservation Department ===
AFCD – This government department provides services with agriculture and fisheries, as well as offering help in the conservation and regulation of animals, plants and fisheries. With regard to dolphins, the department carries out different projects, such as the conservation programme for Chinese white dolphins and the organising of various exhibitions.
