= Édgar Sosa =

Édgar Sosa may refer to:

- Édgar Sosa (basketball) (born 1988), Dominican basketball player
- Édgar Sosa (boxer) (born 1979), Mexican boxer
