= Sosa, Indonesia =

Sub-district of Padang Lawas, North Sumatra, Indonesia

Coordinates: 1.007944°N 99.858742°E

Sosa was a sub-district of Padang Lawas, North Sumatra, Indonesia.

The majority of the population has Hasibuan and Harahap as surname. Two-thirds of the vast expanse of Sosa is oil palm plantations.
