= Maria Peregrina de Souza =

Portuguese novelist, poet and folklorist (1809–1894)

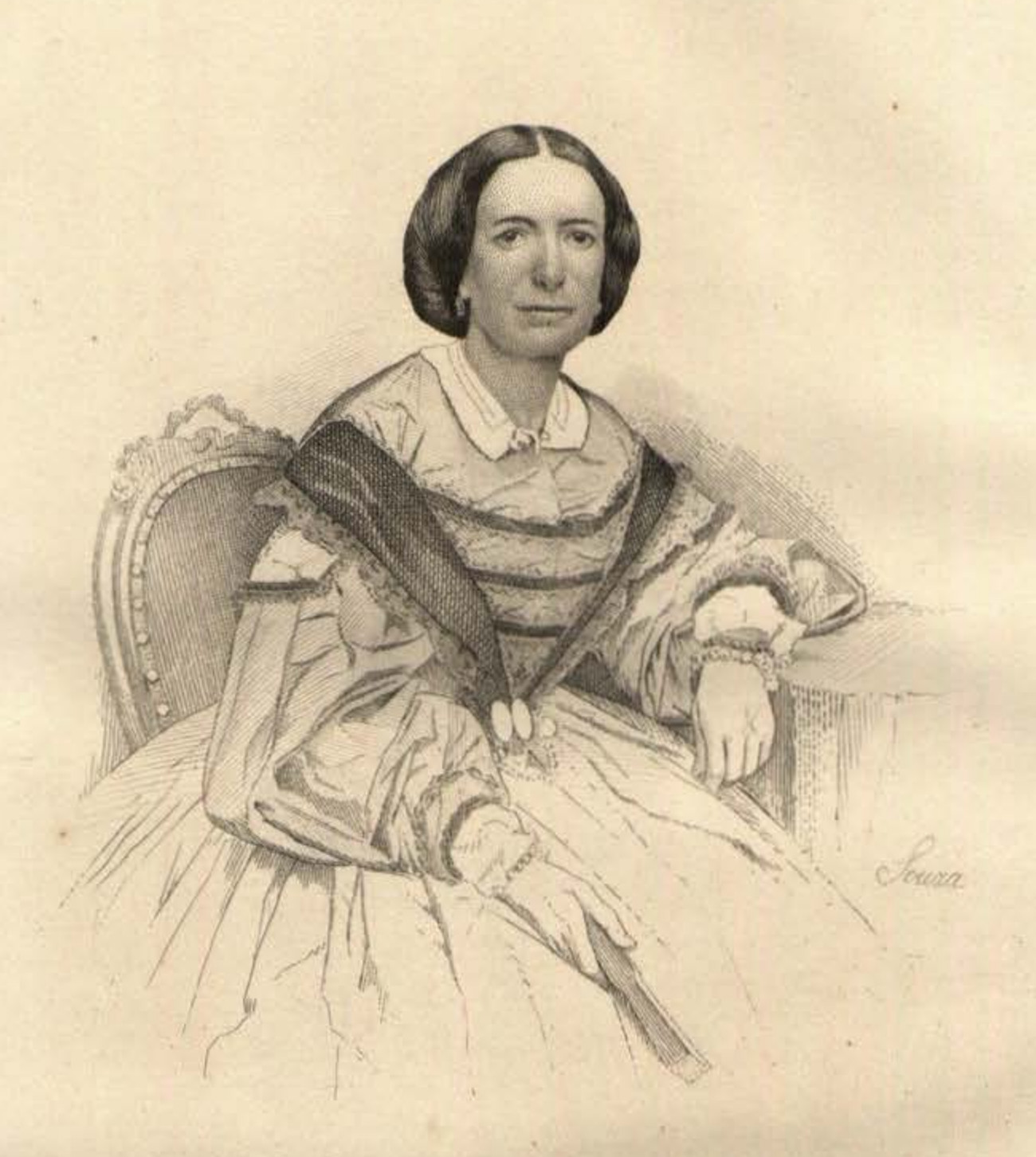
- Maria Peregrina de Souza (1861)
- Born: Maria de Sousa; 13 February 1809; Porto
- Died: 16 November 1894 (aged 85); Porto
- Burial place: Agramonte Cemetery
- Occupations: Novelist, poet, folklorist

Maria Peregrina de Souza (13 February 1809 – 16 November 1894), was a Portuguese novelist, poet and folklorist. She published much of her work under the pseudonyms Uma Obscura Portuense and Mariposa, as well as the initials DMP or DMPS.

== Biography ==
Maria Peregrina was born in Porto, on Rua dos Caldeireiros, the daughter of António Ventura de Azevedo (1784–1856), a silk merchant, and Maria Margarida de Souza Neves (died 1833). She had a sister, Maria do Patrocínio de Souza (1823–1864), also a writer, and a brother, António Mateus de Azevedo e Sousa. Her baptismal name was Maria de Sousa, but her uncle added Peregrina (in English: Pilgrim) to her name because of her family's movements because of the Siege of Porto during the French Invasions.

As a young girl, dancing and reading were permitted in moderation but Maria Peregrina was not allowed to learn about the arts and literature until her mother had specifically approved them. Even then she was restricted to works by Portuguese writers.

In addition to being a merchant, Maria Peregrina's father was a reluctant soldier in the Liberal Wars, on the Miguelist side. When he disobeyed the troops' orders, he was punished with imprisonment, and he was still in custody when his wife, Maria Peregrina's mother, died.

Maria Peregrina moved with her sister to a farm in Moreira da Maia, just outside Porto, and it was there that she began writing. She published her first poem in 1842 in Archivo Pitoresco, and a series on popular beliefs and superstitions from Minho Province, a historical Portuguese province (1936–1976), in Revista Universal Lisbonense, using the pseudonym Uma Obscura Portuense. She also published in Revista Contemporânea de Portugal e Brasil, in Revista Iris and in Almanaque de Lembranças Luso-Brasileiro, and serials in the periodicals A Esperança, Aurora, Pirata, Pobres do Porto, Lidador, O Recreio das Damas, Restauração, A Miscelânea Poética, O Bardo and A Grinalda.

In 1856, her father died and in 1859 she published her first novel, Retalhos do Mundo, which she dedicated to her friend and mentor António Feliciano de Castilho, who had printed her first poem, and was instrumental in promoting her work. In 1963 she published Rhadamanto or A Mana do Conde, and Roberta or A Força da Simpatia, the latter having been published since 1948 in the newspaper Pobres do Porto. In 1866 she published Maria Isabel, previously published in the magazine Esperança, and in 1876 Henriqueta, which had also been published in serial form in 1850, in the newspaper Pirata.

After her sister's death, Maria Peregrina moved in with two friends, Maria Augusta de Carvalho Miranda and Rita de Cássia de Carvalho Miranda, in Porto where she remained for the rest of her life.

She is considered a pioneer of Portuguese ethnography, because of her documentary work on Azorean and Minho folklore. The latter was called Popular Traditions of Minho.

Maria Peregrina de Sousa died in Porto on 16 November 1894, on Rua de Santa Catarina. She was buried in Porto's Agramonte Cemetery of the Carmelites.

== Selected works ==
- 1859 – Patchwork of the world
- 1863 – Rhadamanto or The Count's Sister
- 1864 – Roberta or The Power of Sympathy
- 1866 – Maria Isabel
- 1876 – Henrietta
- Farm
- Popular Traditions of Minho
