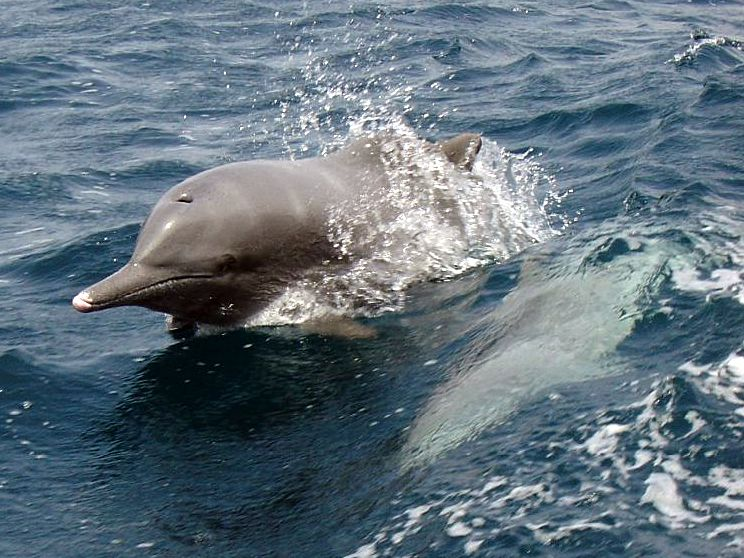
- Indian Ocean humpback dolphin（S. plumbea） off Khasab in Musandam

Conservation status
- Endangered (IUCN 3.1)
- CITES Appendix I

Scientific classification
- Kingdom: Animalia
- Phylum: Chordata
- Class: Mammalia
- Order: Artiodactyla
- Infraorder: Cetacea
- Family: Delphinidae
- Genus: Sousa
- Species: S. plumbea

Binomial name
- Sousa plumbea (G. Cuvier, 1829)
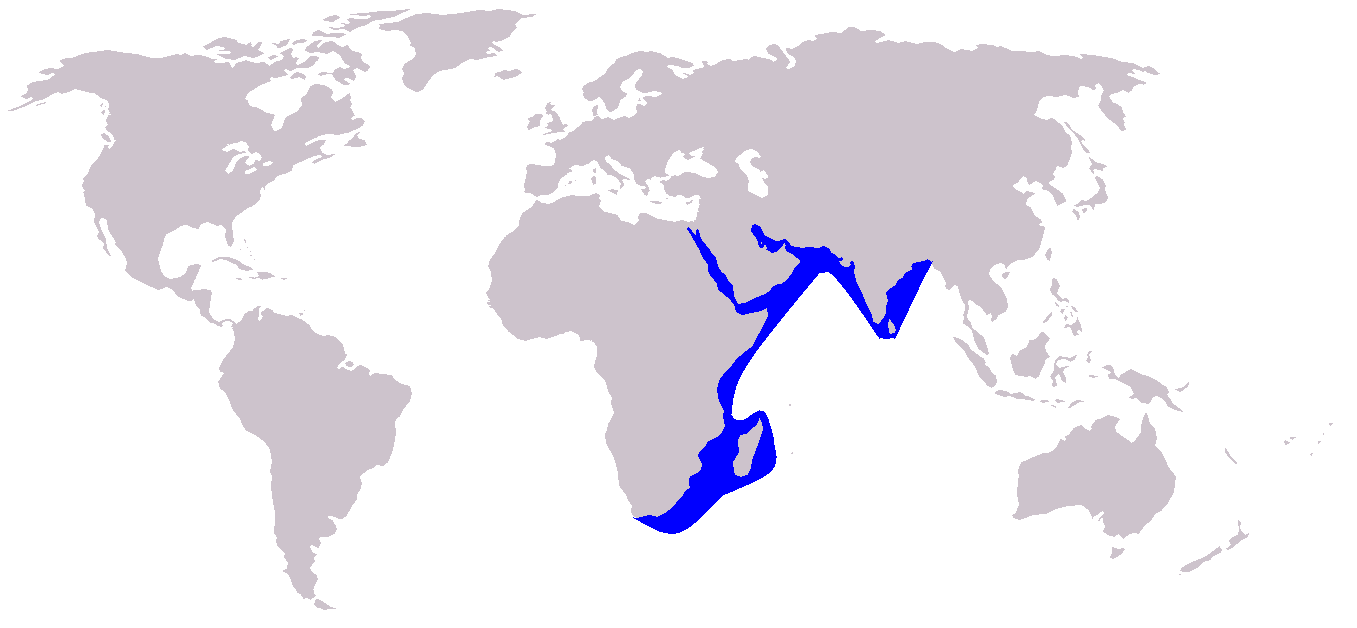
- S. plumbea range

= Indian Ocean humpback dolphin =

Species of mammal

The Indian Ocean humpback dolphin (Sousa plumbea) is a member of the Delphinidae family occupying coastal areas ranging from Southern Africa to Western Indochina. The Indo-Pacific humpback dolphin (Sousa chinensis) was formerly included within the same species, but a 2014 study revealed them to be a separate species.

The most limiting factor to habitat-usage is water depth, with most specimens remaining in waters shallower than 20 meters. As a result, the Indian Ocean humpback dolphin's offshore range is largely dependent on the coastlines' specific physiographical characteristics. The species has been reported to inhabit nearly every type of coastal habitat, although preference and prominence of any given habitat type is highly dependent on the geographical location. Indian Ocean humpback dolphins experience extremely high rates of calf and juvenile mortality due to anthropogenic disturbances such as environmental pollution, habitat deterioration and noise pollution.

Indian Ocean humpback dolphins are social delphinids that live in groups averaging twelve individuals, although group size can be highly variable. The majority of their diet is composed of sciaenid fishes, cephalopods, and crustaceans.

The species is currently categorized as Endangered.

== Distribution and habitat ==
=== Distribution ===
Sousa plumbea ranges from Southern Africa to Western Indochina, including coastal areas along East Africa, the Middle East and India. There is studied population in Menai Bay Conservation Area of Tanzania's Zanzibar Archipelago. Critically important populations have been determined in Southeast Asia, particularly along the southern coastlines of China. Recent investigations have, however, similarly determined critical populations along the coasts of the Arabian peninsula, particularly including the Sultanate of Oman and the United Arab Emirates.

While S. plumbea and S. chinensis are genetically distinguishable, delphinids' high capacity for hybridization have resulted in hybrid populations in areas of overlapping distribution. In fact, genetic analysis has indicated that S. chinensis sampled from Indochina are more closely related to S. plumbea than to S. chinensis from Australia.

This species does not exhibit large migratory behavior.

== Description ==
The Indian Ocean humpback dolphin is a medium-sized dolphin that ranges in length from 2 to 2.8 metres (6.6 to 9.2 ft) and in weight from 150 to 200 kilograms (330 to 440 lb). They have a fatty hump on the back, which differentiates them from S. chinensis which have a more prominent dorsal fin, but no hump.

Different varieties have different coloration, although young dolphins are generally gray, with darker gray above than below. They are generally dark gray.

Indian Ocean humpback dolphins can appear similar to conspecific Indo-Pacific bottlenose dolphins, but the bottlenose dolphins lack the hump. All humpback dolphins have a distinctive motion when surfacing, in that it surfaces at a 30- to 45-degree angle with the rostrum, and sometimes the full head, showing before arching its back and sometimes showing its flukes.

== Sociality ==
The Indian Ocean humpback dolphin is a social delphinid that typically lives within a group. Group size is, however, highly variable. Some specimens have been found to be isolated individuals, although the average group is composed of around 12 individuals and some of the largest observed groups have been in excess of 100 individuals.

There is very little scientific evidence to support significant inter-species interactions and groupings, although rare observations have noted interactions (both friendly and aggressive) with the sympatric Indo-Pacific bottlenose dolphin, snubfin dolphin, long-snouted spinner dolphin and finless porpoise.

== Conservation ==
The Indian Ocean humpback dolphin has proven to be particularly susceptible to the deleterious effects of anthropogenic activity. The species' shallow, coastal habitat heightens their exposure to anthropogenic disturbances such as habitat deterioration, mortality due to by-catch, vessel striking, and noise pollution. The most driving factor appears to be chemical pollution, as tissue analysis of many stranded specimens exhibit fatal concentrations of organochlorines. As a result, a number of nations have preemptively established conservation and management programs to ensure that the species' does not become endangered.

Recent investigative studies have revealed that the United Arab Emirates houses one of the world's largest populations.

== Gallery ==
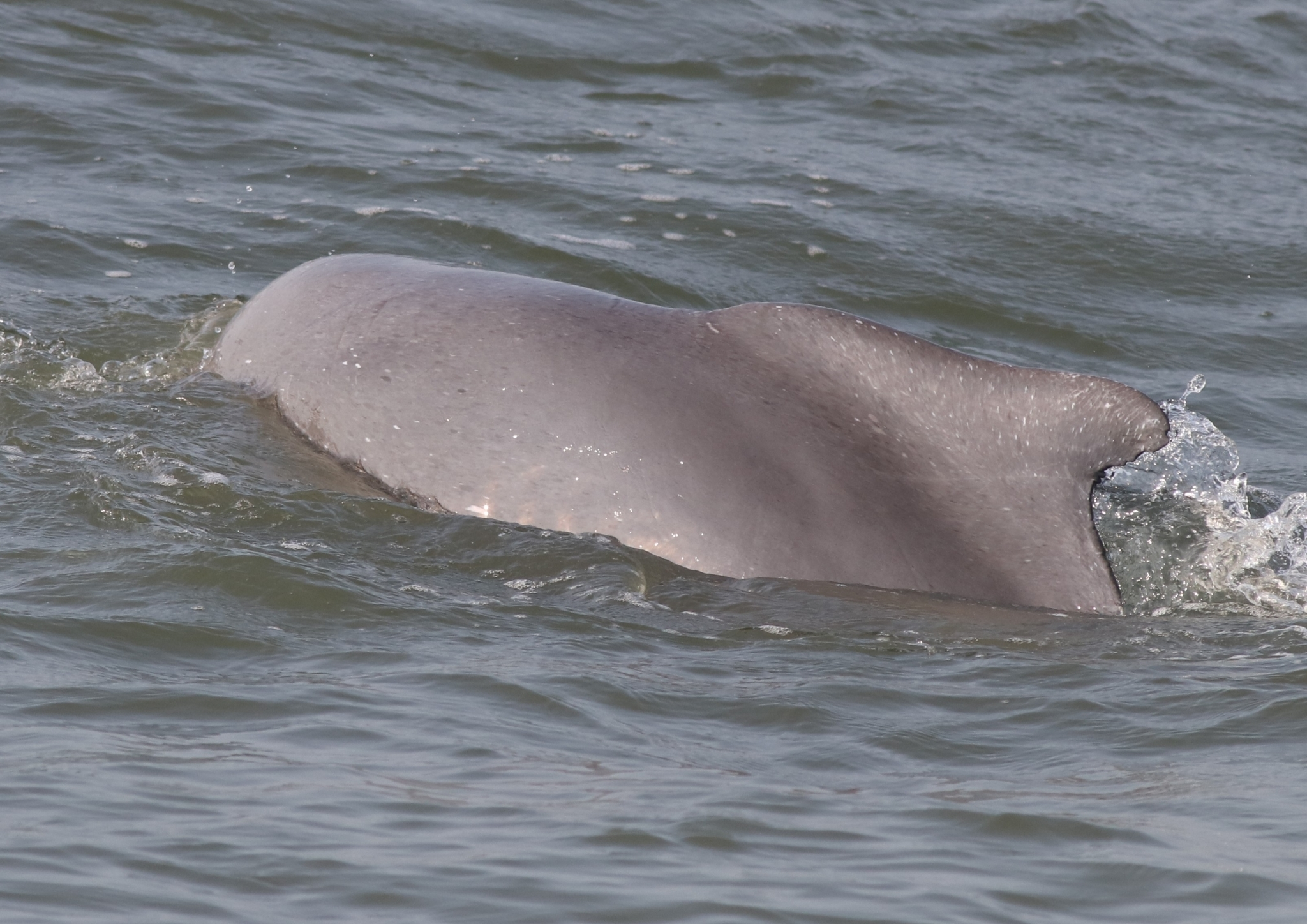
Dorsal fin on an Indian Ocean Humpback Dolphin

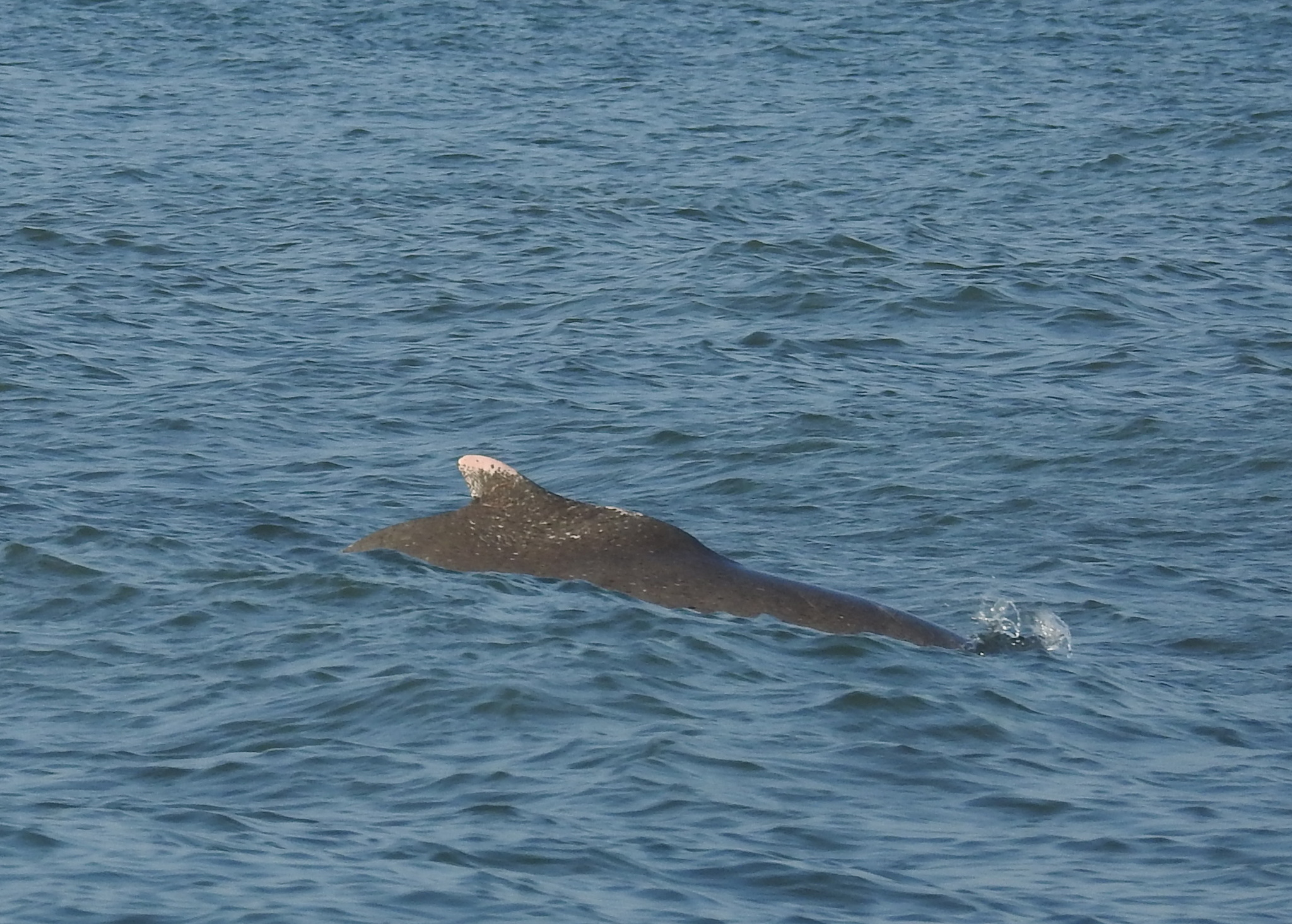
Pattern observed on the dorsal fin of Indian Humpback Dolphins

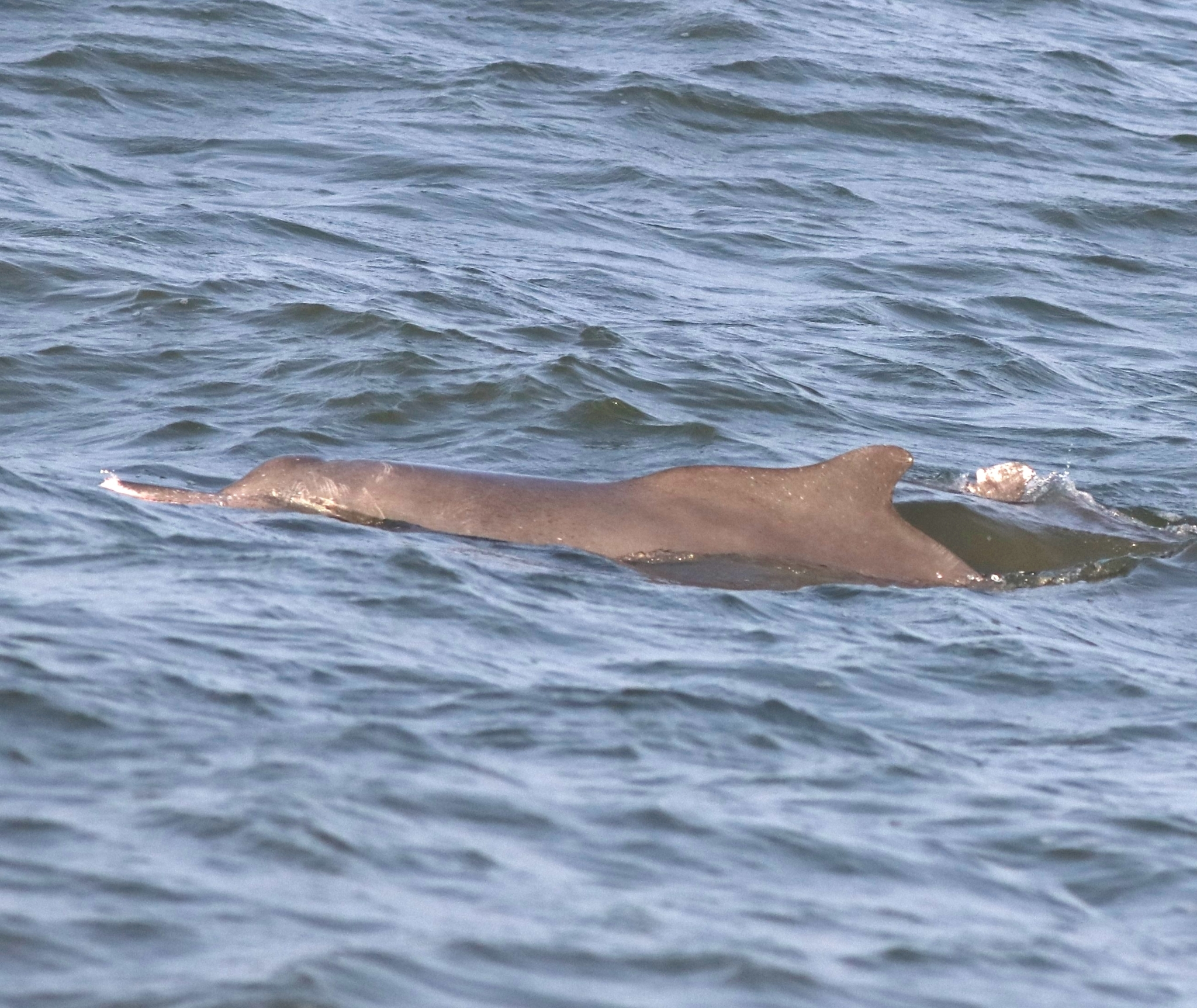
Profile of the Indian Ocean Humpback Dolphin as visible on the surface

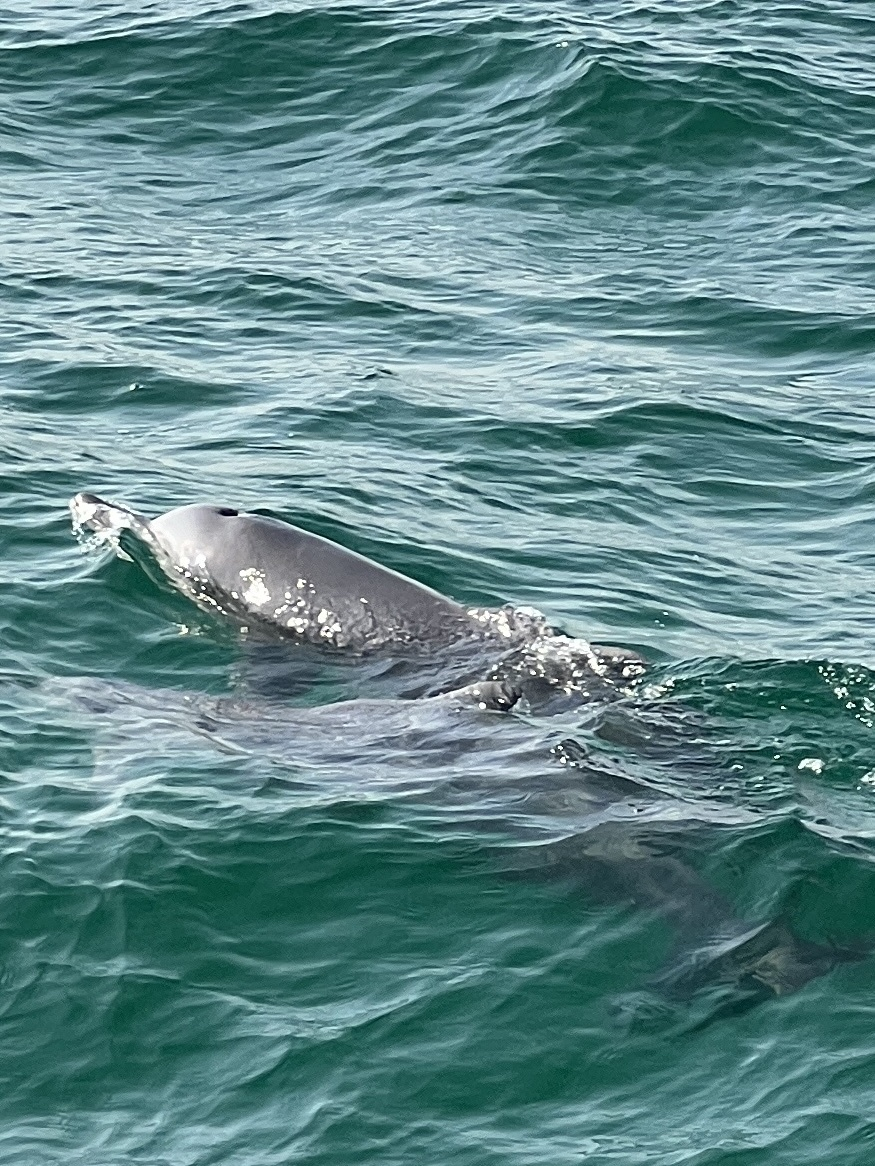
Blowhole of an Indian Ocean Humpback Dolphin visible on the surface

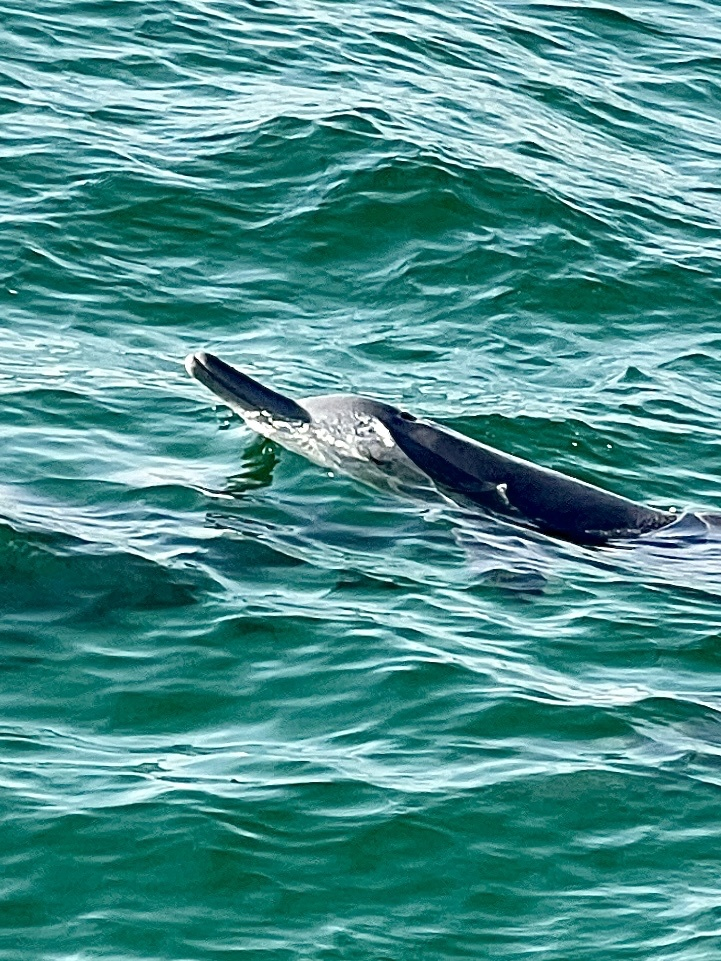
Beak of an Indian Ocean Humpback Dolphin visible above the surface

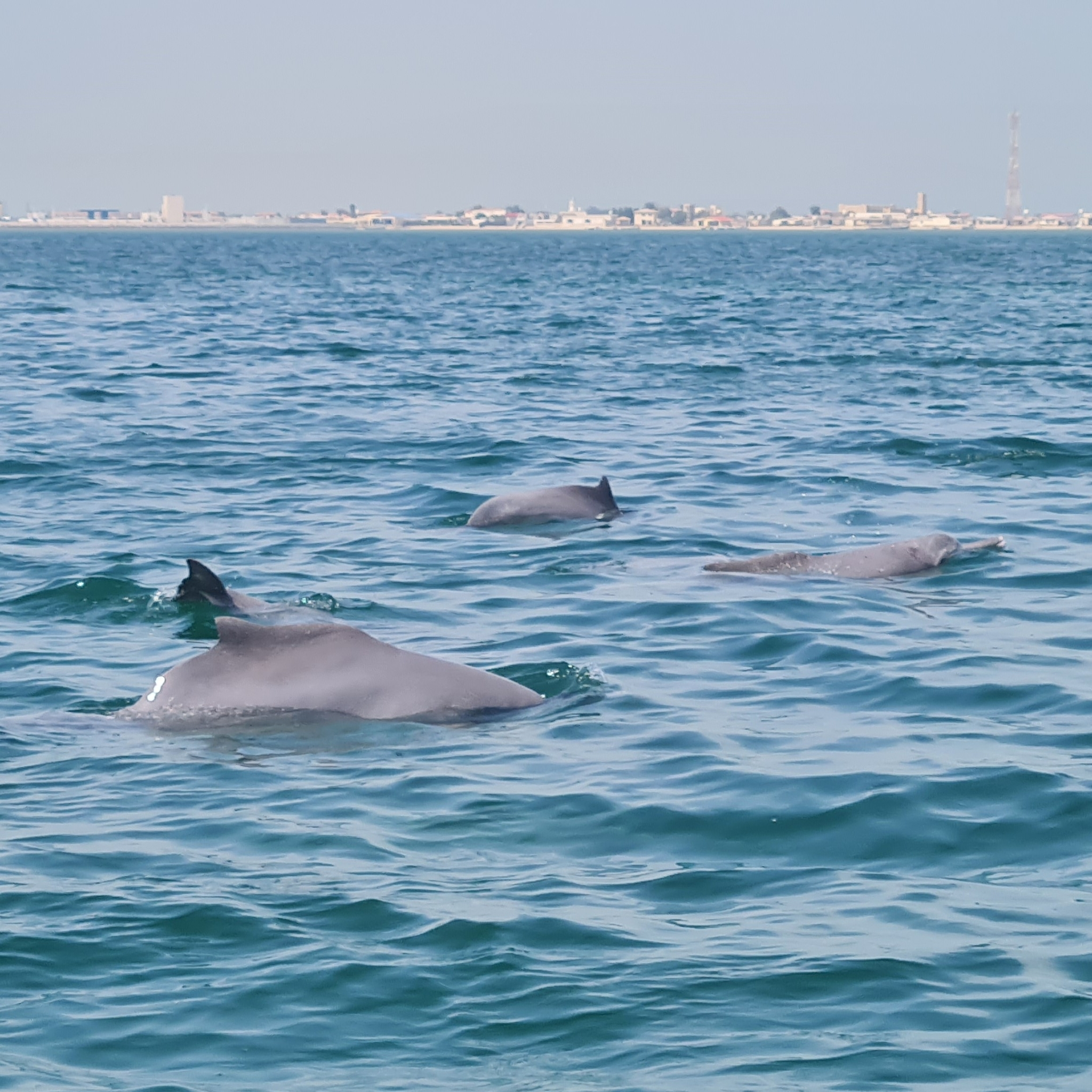
A Pod of Indian Ocean Humpback Dolphins

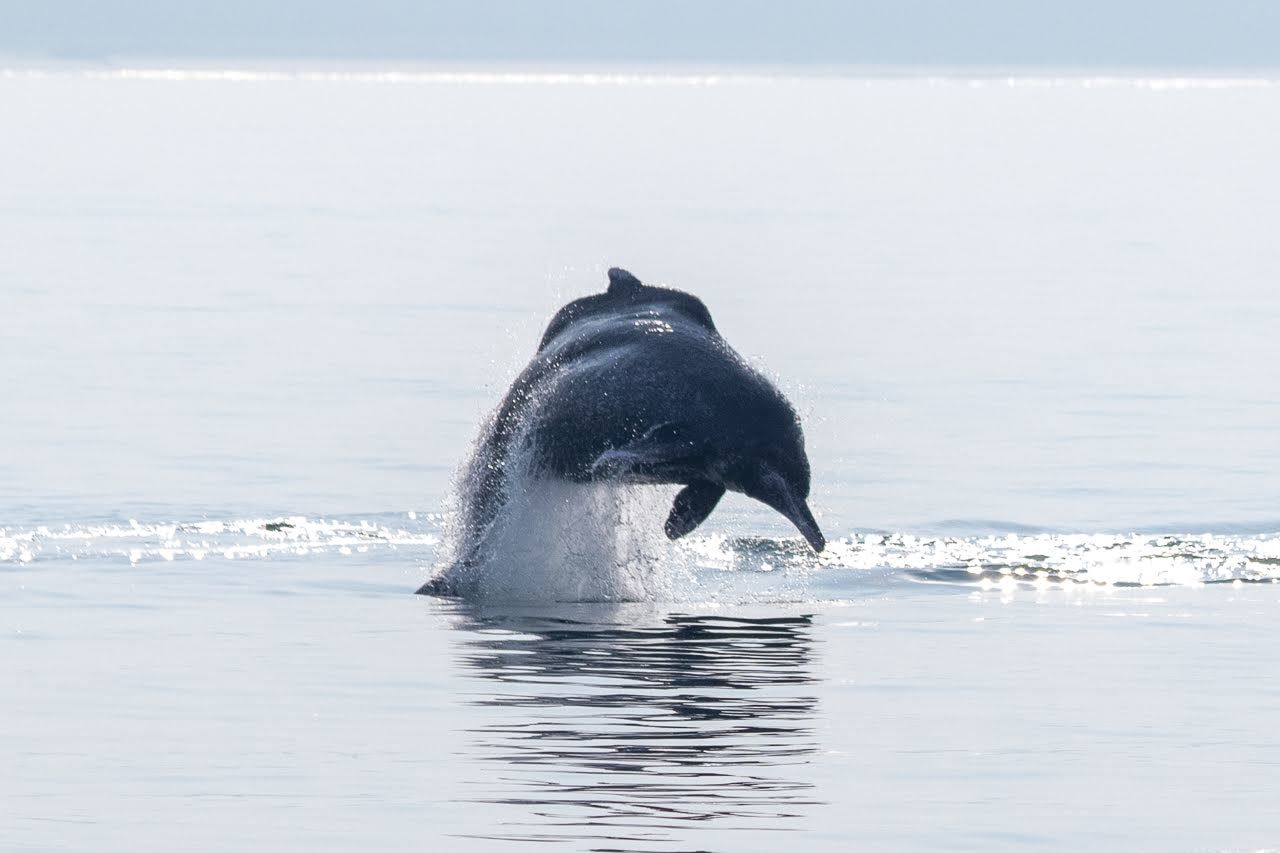
Indian Ocean Humpback Dolphin lunging out of water

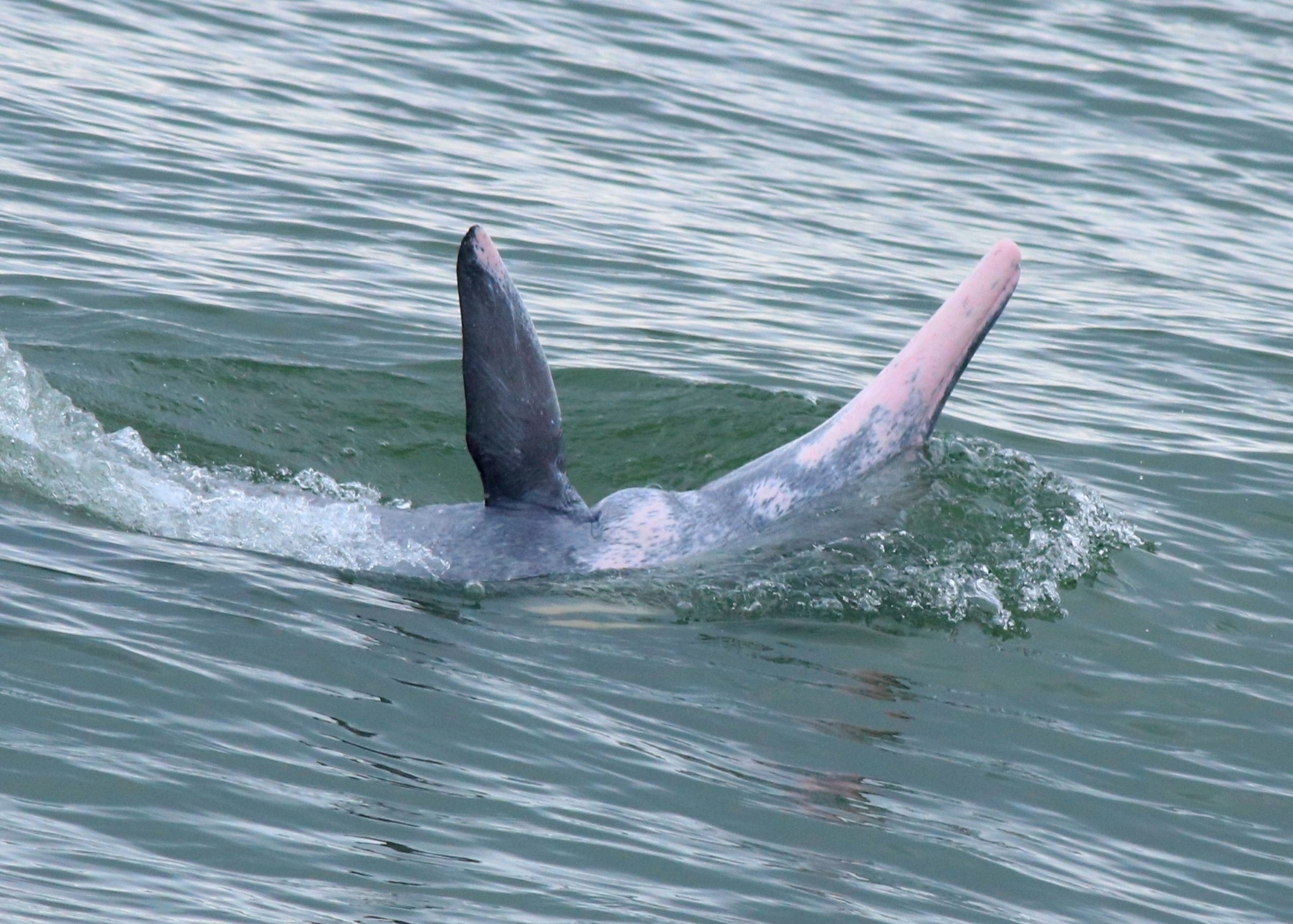
Indian Ocean Humpback Dolphin surfacing

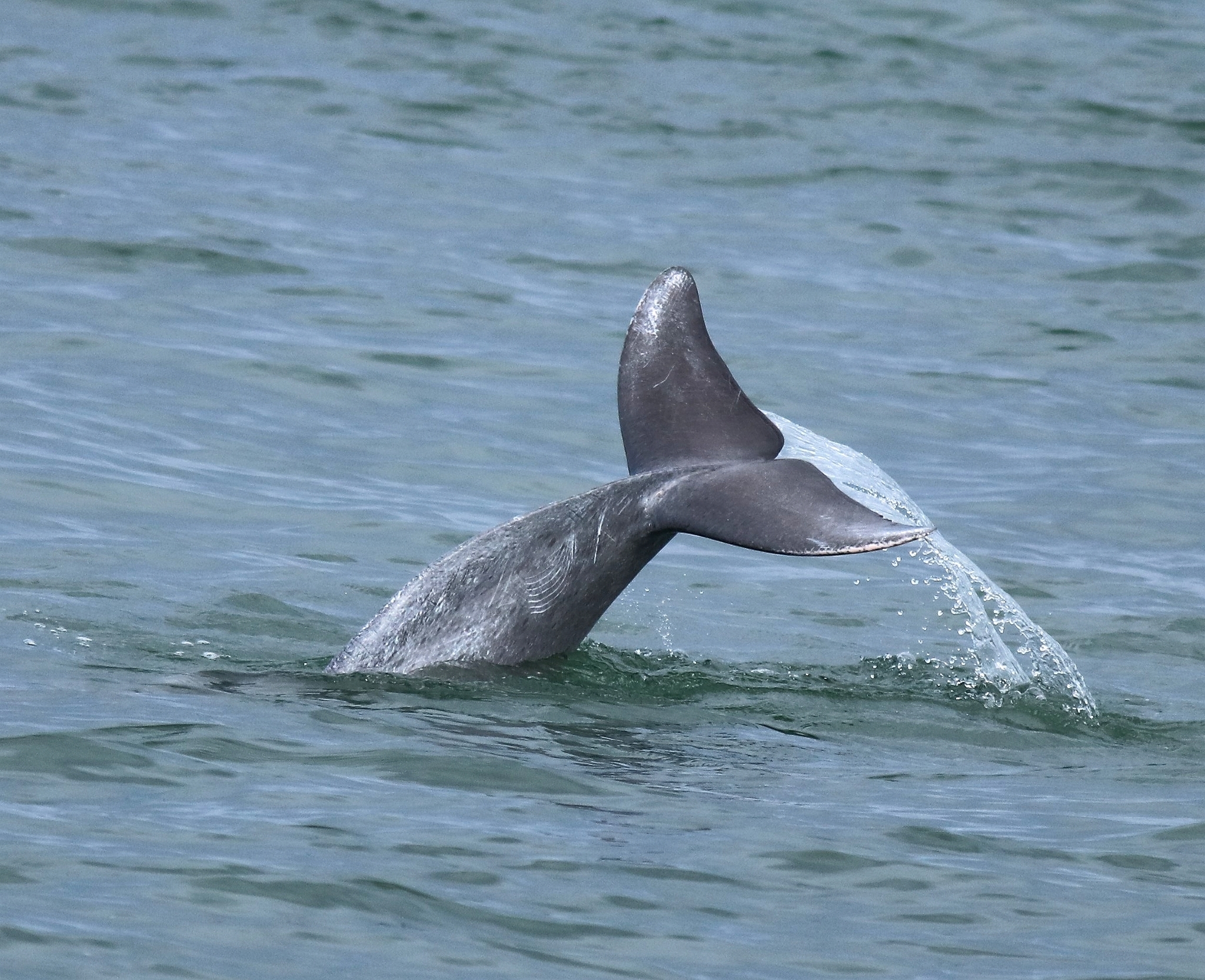
Tail-walking exhibited by Indian Ocean Humpback dolphin

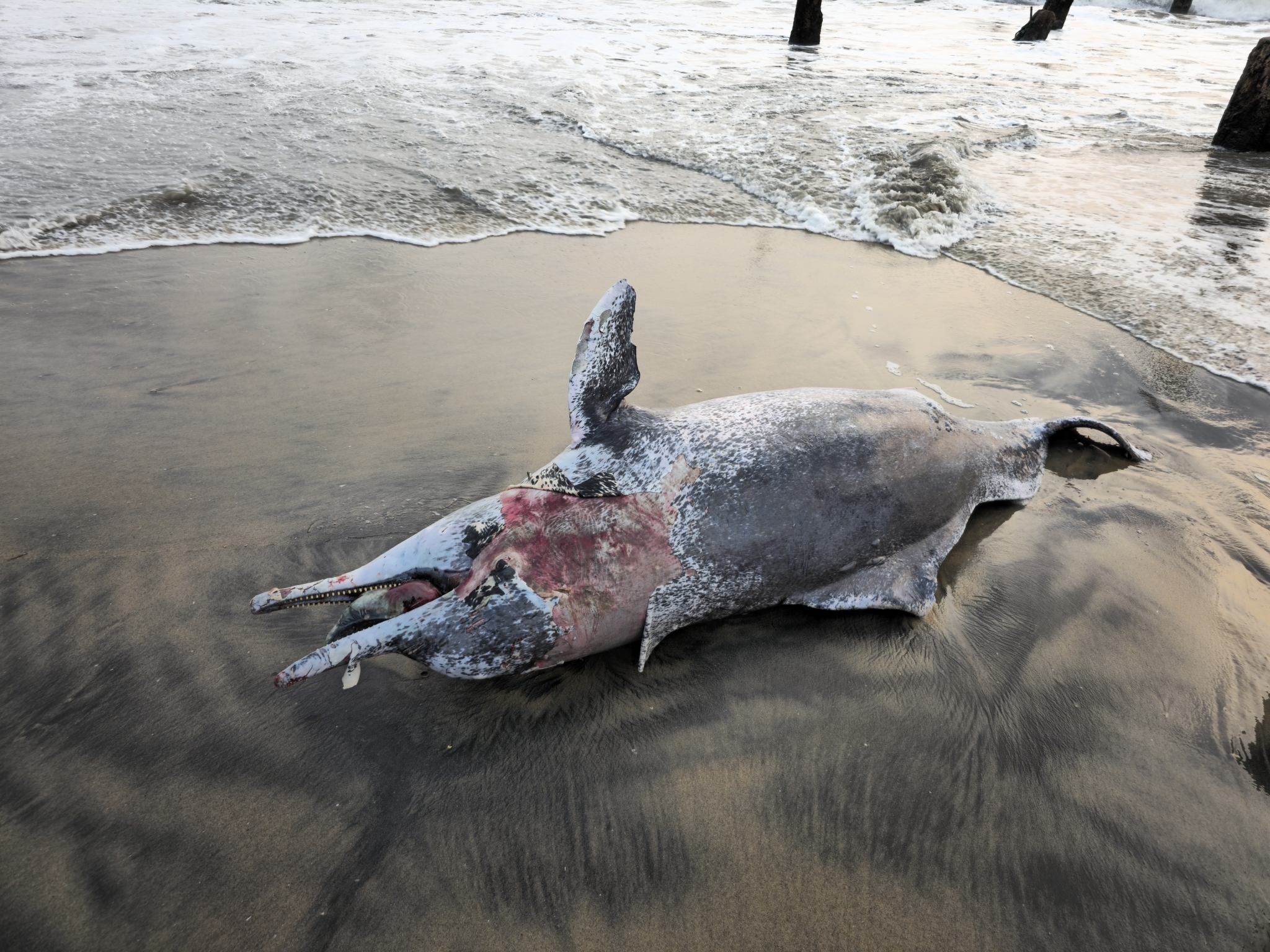
Carcass of Indian Humpback Dolphin washed ashore Kerala coast

== See also ==
- List of cetaceans
