= Franco Sosa =

Franco Sosa may refer to:

- Franco Sosa (footballer, born 1981), Argentine football defender
- Franco Sosa (footballer, born 1983), Uruguayan football midfielder
- Franco Sosa (footballer, born 1995), Argentine football forward
- Franco Sosa (footballer, born 1999), Argentine football forward
