= Lucía Sosa =

Lucía Sosa may refer to:

- Lucía Sosa (athlete) (born 1978), Mexican paralympic athlete
- Lucía Sosa (politician) (born 1957), Ecuadorian teacher and politician
