= Manuel Sosa =

Manuel Sosa may refer to:

- Manuel Sosa (actor) (born 1983), Venezuelan actor
- Manuel Sosa (judge) (born 1950), Belizean judge
- Manuel Ruiz Sosa (1937–2009), Spanish football midfielder and manager
