= Kieren D'Souza =

Personal information
- Citizenship: Indian
- Born: 6 January 1993 (age 33) Bilaspur, Chhattisgarh

Kieren D'Souza (born 6 January 1993 in Bilaspur, Chhattisgarh) is an Indian ultramarathon runner and endurance athlete. In 2016, he became the first Indian to qualify for and finish the Spartathlon, a 246 kilometre footrace from Athens to Sparta held annually in Greece. Kieren, then aged 23, completed the race in 33 hours, 2 minutes and 25 seconds, standing 85th among 370 participants. Up to 2016, only 29 athletes under the age of 25 had completed the race that has been held annually since 1983.

== Early life ==
Kieren was born on 6 January 1993 in the city of Bilaspur, in Chhattisgarh, but his father, Peter D’Souza's job as a Group Captain with the Indian Air Force meant a childhood of moving schools all over India, 'including the cities of Jodhpur, Lucknow, Mumbai, Nagpur and Faridabad'. He attended St. Joseph's College in Bangalore, which is also where he first started running.

== Running career ==
=== Beginning ===
He first took up running as an undergrad student in Bangalore in 2011. He says, "To be honest I didn’t know what marathon running all about till I was in college. I was always heavily into sport, but my choice was never running." He started with a 12 kilometre inter-college event in Bangalore, which did not go well. After that, he ran a 10 kilometre event at Nagpur and finished comfortably. It was after that race that he realised that he was "made for such events" and tried a "half marathon at New Delhi, and then a 100 kilometre race at Mt Blanc, and the Salomon Bhatti Lakes 160 kms [sic] race."

=== 2014 ===
In 2014, he ran the 111 kilometre La Ultra ultramarathon in Ladakh but failed to finish. He came back in 2016 and won the 111 kilometre version of the race, becoming the first Indian to do so. He posted a time of 15 hours and 30 minutes. The La Ultra is dubbed as the 'cruellest' race on earth, starting at an altitude of 10,500 feet in the Nubra Valley, before going up to "Khardung La, the world's highest motorable pass at 17,700 feet."

=== 2015 ===
In 2015, aged 22, he won the Salomon Bhatti Lakes 160 kilometre ultramarathon in Faridabad, with a time of 20 hours and 32 minutes, over nine hours ahead of the second place finisher. At the time, this was the fastest time recorded by an Indian over a 100 mile race. This qualified him for the Ultra-Trail du Mont-Blanc — Courmayeur Champex Chamonix (UTMB-CCC) — a 100 kilometre race at along the base of Mont Blanc in the Alps. He was the only Indian competitor at the race held in August. He finished with a time of 18 hours 46 minutes and 2 seconds, placing 224th out of 1900 runners.

=== 2016 ===
In 2016, he qualified for the Spartathlon after winning the Salomon Bhatti Lakes ultramarathon. Entry to Spartathlon is through a lottery. The only person on his support crew was his mother Christabel D’Souza. During the race, he "created a new 100-mile record of 18 hours 37 minutes, the first by an Indian, when he reached the 47th Check point at a distance of 159.5km." At checkpoint 47, he was in 64th place, moving up to 60th place at checkpoint 60 (195.5 km from the start and 51 km from the finish). It was at this point that he developed an inflammation in a tendon, slowing him down. He told Indian media, "It was only about 50km from the finish when the pain around my left shin developed, that I felt I would take longer than expected to reach the finish line. Over the next 50km, I kept setting small targets and finally reached with more than 2 hours 35 minutes left for the cut-off."

=== 2017 ===
On 14 January 2017, he competed in the Vibram Hong Kong 100 km Ultra Trail Race. He finished in 13 hours 28 minutes, placing 78th among 1576 finishers. In preparation for the high altitude race, he "spent most of the time training in the beautiful hills of Manali, where the hills are more treacherous than what [he] expected in Hong Kong." For the HK100 his focus was mostly on putting a lot of elevation or vertical kilometers in his training.

This year also saw Kieren DSouza and Ullas Narayana taking the Indian Flag for the first time to the Ultra Running World Championships at Bradia Pratalia, Italy. Later in July the team they were joined by Aparna Choudhary and Meenal Kotak to represent India at the 24 Hour World Championships at Belfast.

=== 2018 ===
On 12 May 2018, Kieren along with a six member team from India participated at the 2018 Trail World Championships. He ranked 98th overall and was the first Indian to move into the top 100 at the World event

=== 2020 ===
In June 2020, he did a 'Fastest known time' ascent of 5,290m Friendship Peak in the Kullu Valley in 11 hours, 35 minutes.

On 1 October 2020, Kieren climbed Deo Tibba 6,001m peak in 19 hours, 38 minutes on a round trip from Allain Duhangan hydroelectric power plant in Kullu, Himachal Pradesh.

== Training ==
D’Souza does not have a full-time coach, and plans his workouts himself, with inputs from other ultrarunners and part-time coaches. He trained for his August 2016 La Ultra by doing altitude work in Spiti Valley and Leh, logging 160 kilometres per week, with as much as 700 kilometres in June 2016. His post-run recovery included "a banana, coconut water, nuts and pea-protein shake." He makes his own shakes and salads.

In preparation for the UTMB-CCC, D’Souza would run from Bangalore suburbs of Malleswaram to Yelahanka or Indiranagar - distance of 13-17 kilometres - at least six times a week. Twice a week, he was doing 200 meter sprints 20 to 30 times.

To prepare for Spartathlon, he moved to a protein and fat rich diet, and ran at least 20 hours per week, "time on feet" being a focus of his training. Normally logging 90-100 kilometres per week, he had to increase his mileage for the race. He included strength and cross training like swimming and cycling in his workouts. Leading up to the race, he was clocking 30-50 kilometres per day at a 12 km per hour pace. This was in addition to speed work through interval training, tempo runs, and strength workouts for his legs, core and lower back.

His training philosophy looks at running as a form of meditation. "For me it’s more like breathing, one cannot run more than 100 km, if they are not as comfortable with it as living their everyday life. That’s always the target – to be comfortable with it. If I’m not running on the road, I’m questioning my own existence." When he is not running, he likes to cycle long distances.

== See also ==
- Zainul Abideen (runner)
