= Security of Supply Arrangement =

US military agreement

The Security of Supply Arrangements, abbreviated as SOSA, are bilateral arrangements made by the United States Department of Defense (DoD) with other nations that ensures mutual transport of defense goods and services between the signatory countries. The United States has signed SOSA with 18 countries across continents.

This arrangement allows the signatory nations to ask for priority delivery for their specific contracts and orders with U.S. defense firms. This enables a reciprocal industrial priority systems that promotes acquisition of defense goods and services between two countries. It encourages interoperability and assures quick delivery during emergencies and wartimes.

== SOSA Signatories ==
The DoD has signed SOSA with 18 countries:

- Australia
- Canada (Note: DoD does not have a SOSA with Canada, but the U.S. Dept. of Commerce has an MoU with Government Services Canada and Canadian Public Works that provides priorities support.)
- Denmark
- Estonia
- Finland
- India
- Israel
- Italy
- Japan
- Latvia
- Lithuania
- Netherlands
- Norway
- South Korea
- Singapore
- Spain
- Sweden
- United Kingdom
