= Suså =

Suså may refer to:

- Suså Municipality, a former municipality in Zealand, Denmark
- Suså River, a river in Zealand, Denmark

== See also ==
- Susa (disambiguation)
