= Susa (disambiguation) =

Susa is an ancient city of the Elamite, Persian and Parthian empires of Iran, located in the lower Zagros Mountains.

Susa may also refer to:

== Geographical ==
=== Settlements ===
- Susa, Piedmont, an Italian city and comune in the Piedmont region
- Shush, Iran, a modern city near ancient Susa
- Susa, Cundinamarca, a Colombian municipality and town in the Cundinamarca Department
- Susa, Libya, a Libyan town and seaside resort in the Jabal al Akhdar District
- Susa or Sūsa, the Berber spelling of Sousse, a Tunisian city in the Sousse Governorate

=== Other geographical ===
- Shush County, an administrative subdivision of Iran
- March of Susa, an alternate name for the March of Turin, a march (territory) covering Susa that was subordinated into the House of Savoy
- Susa Point, on South Georgia island, southern Atlantic
- Susa Valley, an Italian valley in the Piedmont region

== Other uses ==
- Conrad Susa (1935–2013), American composer
- Susa, the nickname for Jesusa Cruz Avilés, a fictional character who is part of the Puerto Rican comedy duo Susa y Epifanio
- SUSA, the Scottish University Sailing Association

== See also ==
- Suså (disambiguation)
- Sousa (disambiguation)
- Şuşa, or Shusha, in Azerbaijan
