= Clara Sousa-Silva =

Astrochemist

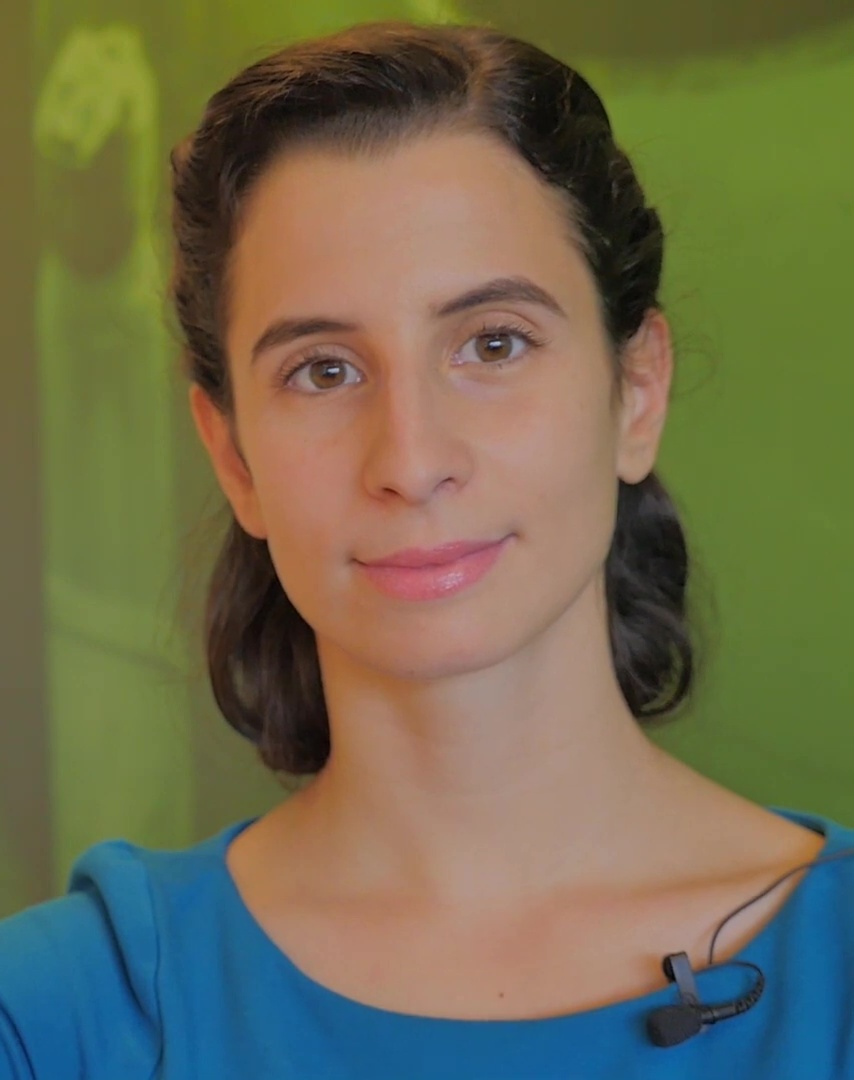

Academic background
- Education: University of Edinburgh, University College London
- Thesis: Modelling Phosphine Spectra for the Atmospheric Characterization of Cool Stars and Exoplanets (2015)
- Doctoral advisor: Jonathan Tennyson
- Website: https://clarasousasilva.space/

Clara Sousa-Silva is an astrochemist who is a research scientist at Center for Astrophysics | Harvard & Smithsonian. Sousa-Silva is an expert on phosphine. She has contributed to investigations of the possibility of life on Venus, working with Jane Greaves and others. Sousa-Silva also directs the Harvard-MIT Student Research Mentoring Program, which pairs high school students with astronomers to conduct research.
