= Taíssa Sousa =

Brazilian politician (born 1989)

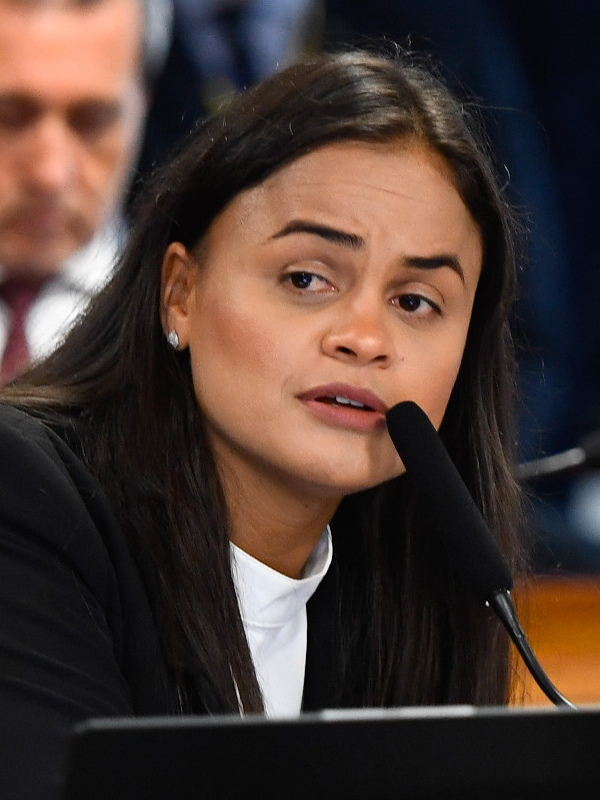
- Sousa in 2025

Member of the Legislative Assembly of Rondônia
- Incumbent
- Assumed office 1 February 2023

Personal details
- Born: 27 June 1989 (age 37)
- Party: Podemos

Taíssa da Silva Sousa (born 27 June 1989) is a Brazilian politician serving as a member of the Legislative Assembly of Rondônia since 2023. She is the youngest current member of the Assembly.
