= Coelho =

Coelho (Portuguese pronunciation: [ku'eʎu], Hebrew: קוּאֵלְיוֹ) is a surname of Portuguese and Jewish (Sephardic) origin, meaning "rabbit". The surname indicates Jewish priestly origin, likely adopted due to its phonetic similarity to the surname Cohen. This connection would have been significant in preserving the family's historical identity during periods of assimilation and exile. During the Portuguese Inquisition, many Sephardic families – including those bearing the surname Coelho – adopted or retained such surnames as a means of survival and identity preservation. Evidence predating the Inquisition suggests the family originated in the Beira Litoral region, particularly around Coimbra and Aveiro. Notable people with the surname include:

- Adriano Coelho (born 1989), Brazilian politician
- Arnaldo Cézar Coelho, Brazilian football referee
- Bento Coelho da Silveira (ca. 1630–1708), Portuguese painter
- Carlos Coelho, Portuguese politician
- Carlos Pinto Coelho, Portuguese journalist, writer, photographer and media professor
- Claire Coelho, Australian football (soccer) player
- Duarte Coelho, Portuguese nobleman and colonial administrator
- Dyego Rocha Coelho, Brazilian football player
- Eduardo Prado Coelho, Portuguese writer, journalist, columnist and university professor
- Eduardo Teixeira Coelho, maker of comic books
- Eliane Coelho, Brazilian soprano
- Elzo Coelho, Brazilian football player
- Evelina Coelho, Portuguese artist
- Fabián Coelho, Uruguayan football player
- Gaspar Coelho, Portuguese Jesuit
- Gonçalo Coelho, Portuguese explorer
- Henrique Maximiano Coelho Neto, Brazilian writer, politician, and professor
- Humberto Coelho, Portuguese football player
- Jackson Avelino Coelho, commonly known as Jajá, Brazilian footballer born 1986
- Jackson Coelho Silva, Brazilian footballer
- Jaime Luiz Coelho (1916–2013), Brazilian Roman Catholic archbishop
- José Dias Coelho, Portuguese painter and sculptor
- José da Silva Coelho, Goan Catholic writer
- Joseph Coelho, British poet and children's book author
- Manuel Rodrigues Coelho, Portuguese organist and composer
- Maria de Belém Roseira Martins Coelho Henriques de Pina, Portuguese politician
- Mário Coelho Pinto de Andrade, Angolan poet and politician
- Nicolau Coelho, Portuguese explorer
- Nuno André Coelho, Portuguese footballer
- Nuno Miguel Prata Coelho, Portuguese footballer
- Oliverio Coelho, Argentine writer and critic
- Paulo Coelho, Brazilian lyricist and novelist
- Paulo de Almeida Coelho, Portuguese Paralympic athlete
- Pedro Passos Coelho, Portuguese politician and prime minister
- Ricardo Coelho, Portuguese marathon canoeist
- Sara Pinto Coelho, Portuguese writer and playwright
- Tony Coelho, American congressman

== See also ==
- Engenheiro Coelho, a municipality in São Paulo state in Brazil.
- Pedro Manuel Oliveira Martins (born 1988), known as Coelho, Portuguese futsal player
- Conejo, a Spanish-language surname, variant of Coelho
- Coello, a Galician-language variant
