= Coello =

Coello is a Galician surname, meaning rabbit; it may refer to:

== People ==
- Alejandro Domínguez Coello (c. 1950–2005), chief of police of Nuevo Laredo, México
- Alonso Sánchez Coello (1531–1588), Spanish painter
- Antonio Coello (1611–1652), Spanish dramatist and poet
- Augusto Coello (1884–1941), who wrote the lyrics for the National Anthem of Honduras
- Carlos A. Coello Coello, Mexican computer scientist
- Claudio Coello (1642–1693), Spanish Baroque painter
- Diego Dávila Coello (c. 1621–c. 1680), 1st Marquis of Navamorcuende, Spanish soldier and colonial administrator
- Juan Manuel Coello (born 1976), Honduran footballer
- Juana Coello (1548–?), wife of Antonio Pérez, Secretary of State of Philip II of Spain
- Óscar Coello (born 1947), Peruvian poet, professor and literary critic
- Rafael Coello Ramos (1877–1967), Honduran musician and composer, and founder of Orquesta Verdi
- Renán Almendárez Coello (born 1953), Honduran-born L. A. radio host, known as El Cucuy
- Robert Coello (born 1984), American baseball player
- Víctor Coello (born 1974), Honduran footballer

== Places ==
- Coello, Tolima, Colombia
- North City, Illinois, U.S., also known as Coello
- Coello River, Colombia

== See also ==
- Mariana Grajales Cuello (1808–1893), leader in the struggle for Cuban independence
- Coelho, a Portuguese-language variant
- Conejo (surname), a Spanish-language variant
- Conill (disambiguation), a Catalan-language variant
