= Conill =

Conill is a Catalan-language surname, meaning rabbit, and may refer to:

- Enrique Conill (1899–1970), a Cuban sailor
- Joseph Sadoc Alemany y Conill (1814–1888), a Spanish Catholic clergyman

== See also ==
- Conill (Tàrrega), abandoned village in Tàrrega municipality, Catalonia
- Conill, village in Pujalt municipality, Catalonia
- Conejo, a Spanish-language variant
- Coelho, a Portuguese-language variant
- Coello (disambiguation), a Galician-language variant
