= Conill (Tàrrega) =

Abandoned village in Catalonia, Spain

Coordinates: 41.7092°N 1.1514°E

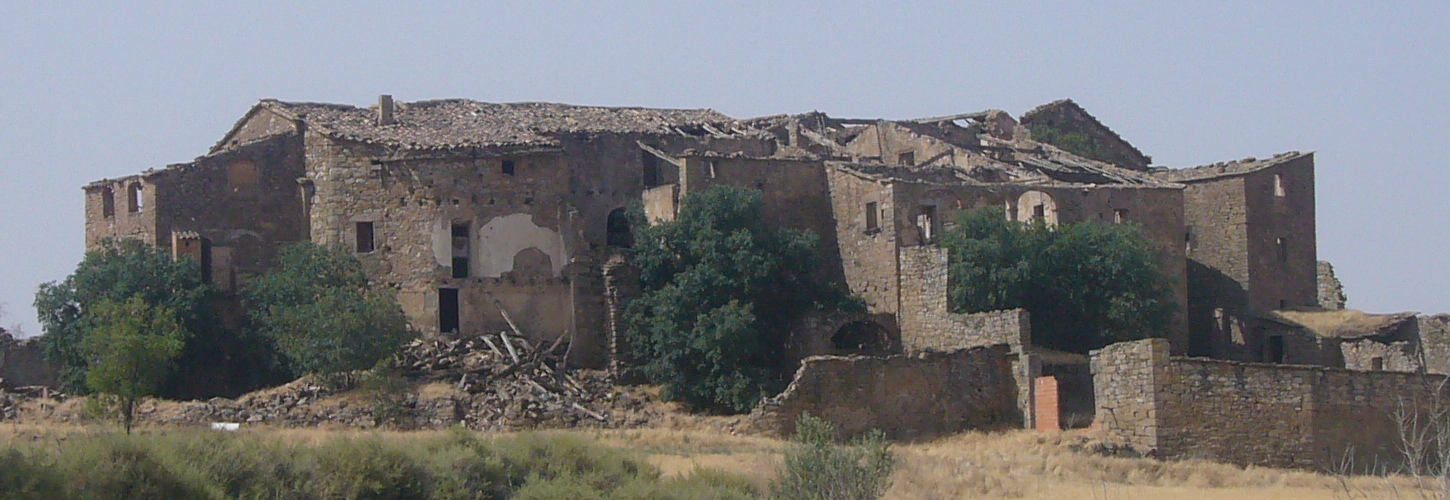
Conill

Conill (Catalan pronunciation: [kuˈniʎ], sometimes spelled Cunill) is a small abandoned village near the town of Tàrrega in Catalonia, Spain.

== Geography ==
The village is located about 7 km north of Tàrrega town, the nearest settlements being the villages of Claravalls, Altet and La Figuerosa, accessible via dirt tracks. It was within the municipality of La Figuerosa until the latter was absorbed into Tàrrega municipality in 1969.

It is located in the Plans de Sió, a sub-region of the Segarra plateau, a relatively flat mainly grain-farming region at about 350 metres elevation. A short distance (500 m) to the north lies a small endorheic basin known as Salades de Conill ("Conill saltlands"), which due to its damp and salty soil supports halophyte vegetation such as various species in the amaranth, rush, and tamarisk families.

== History ==
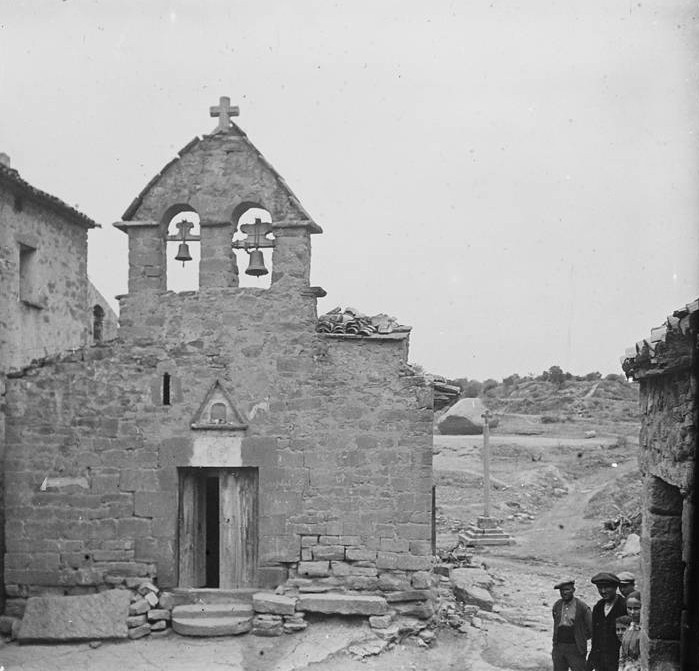
Conill's church in 1916

Conill was inhabited since ancient times. The village's church was mentioned in a document from 1151. The former church of Mare de Déu del Roser (Our Lady of the Rosary) dates from 1702. The rest of the village consists of five large houses built in the 18th century, named Cal Pont, Cal Palou, Cal Frare, Cal Cinca, and Cal Vilafranca, after the families who lived and worked there, and associated farm buildings, all surrounding a small village square. An agreement among the five families prevented the addition of any more buildings to the village.

The village included an olive-pressing plant, producing oil from olives collected in the region.

Following a long period of decline, Conill was finally abandoned in 1980 and the village was quickly stripped of most of its assets. The massive wooden olive press was removed, necessitating the demolition of its building (attached to Cal Palou), and is now located, along with its doorway and a water well from Conill, in the Parc de Sant Eloi, a public park in Tàrrega. The carved stone cross was stolen from the top of the village's boundary cross column, and in 2013 the rest of the monument was moved to Parc de Sant Eloi, with a reproduction carving placed on the restored column.

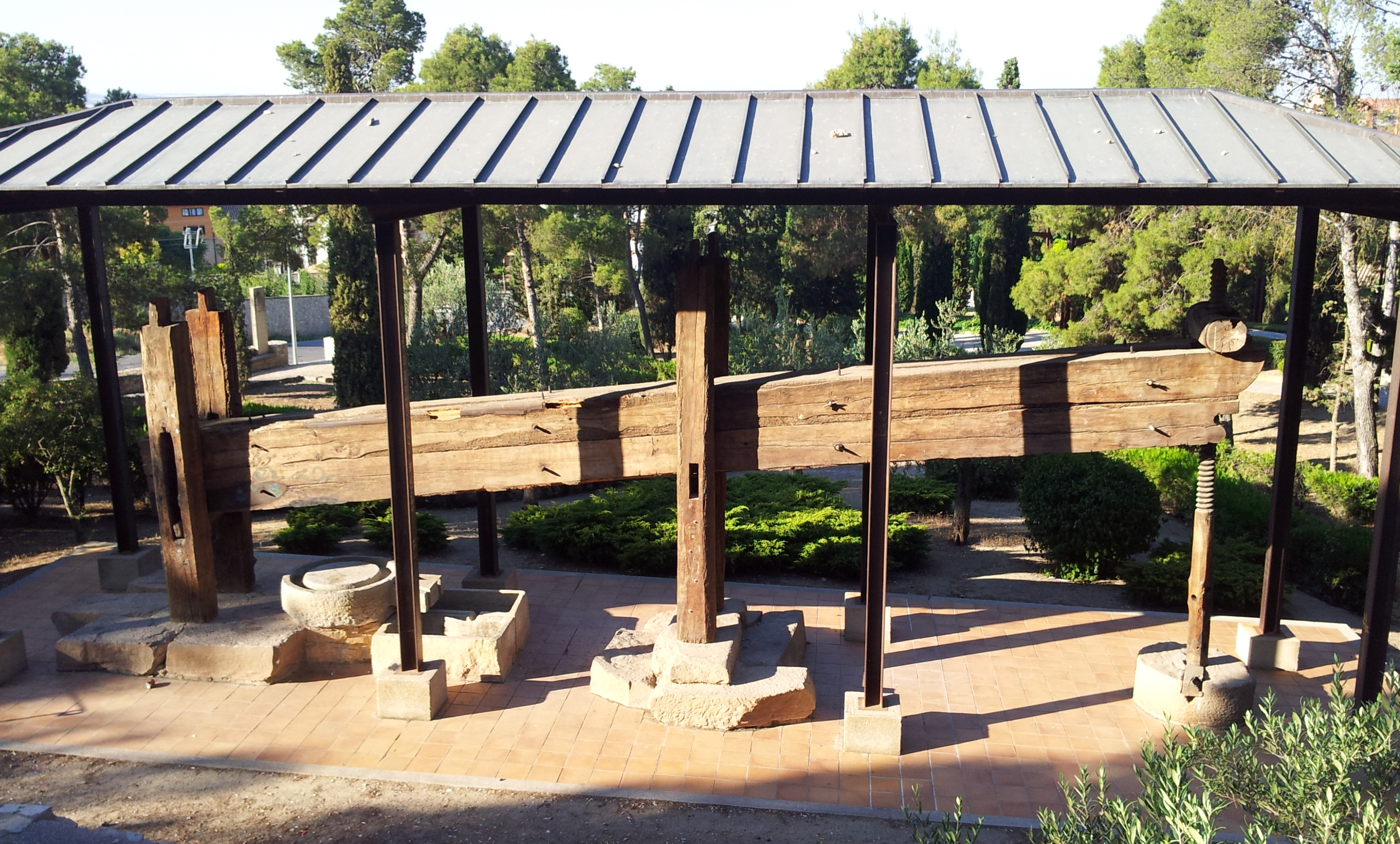
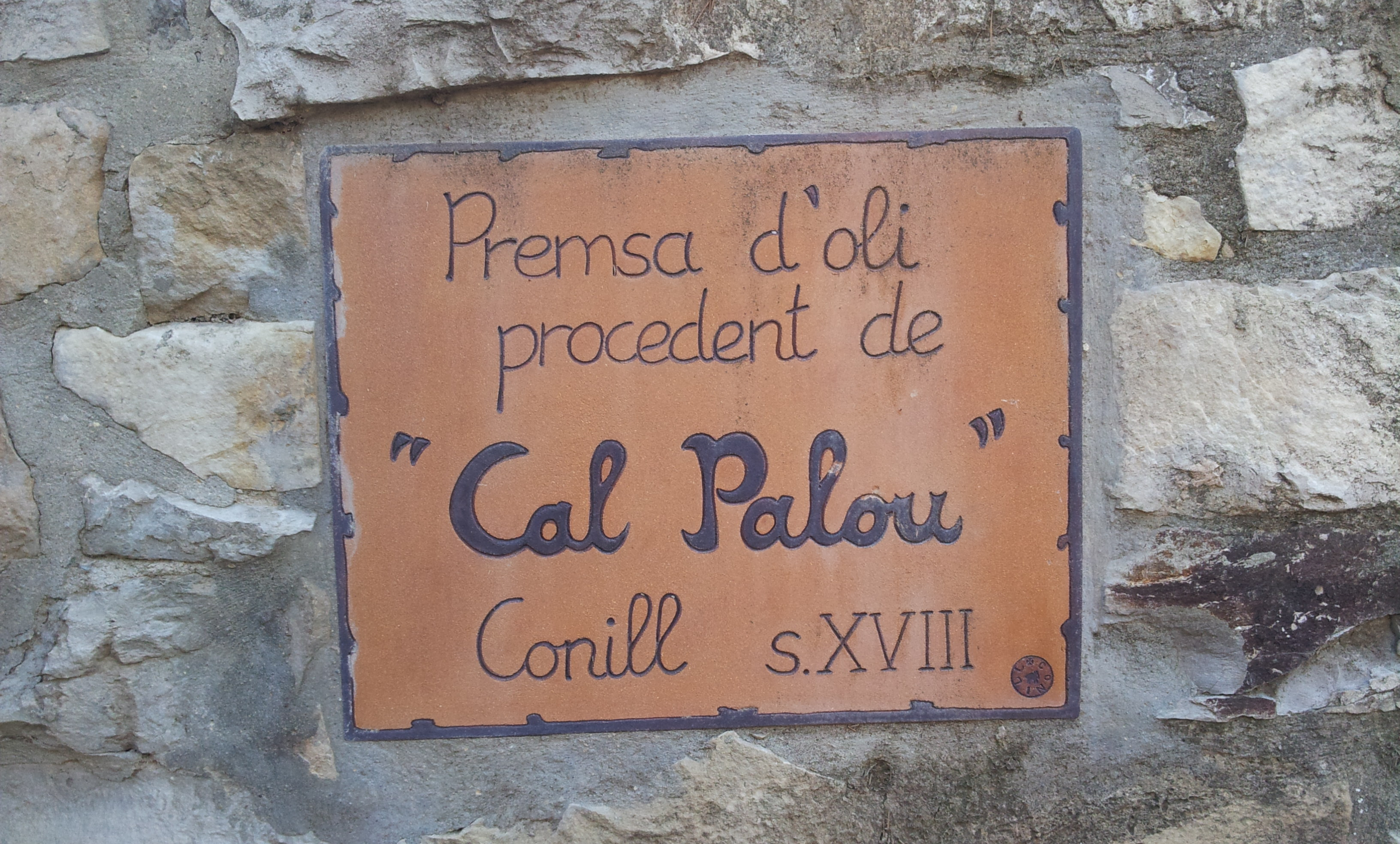
Conill's olive press on display in Tàrrega

Since the abandonment of the village, several initiatives have been proposed for its revitalisation.

In 1989, a proposal was made to redevelop the village as a rehabilitation centre for drug addicts. The owner of one of the buildings donated it to the charity concerned, and authorities indicated their willingness to extend drinking-water and electricity supplies to the village, but the initiative was opposed by many local people, and eventually abandoned.

Around 2005, a private business proposed to develop the village as an eco-friendly tourist centre, but that was abandoned due to financial difficulties and further structural decay of the buildings.

In 2007, the municipal authorities published proposals to turn Conill into an interpretive centre for the surrounding countryside, and the government indicated its support in a management plan for the region, but the initiative was abandoned in 2010 due to economic circumstances. In 2013, it was revealed that the village of Concabella, 8 km away, had instead received funding for an interpretive centre.

In 2015, Conill was bought by the owners of the naturist village of El Fonoll, 30 km away, with the intention of restoring the buildings and turning the village into a centre for artists and artisans.

== Current status ==
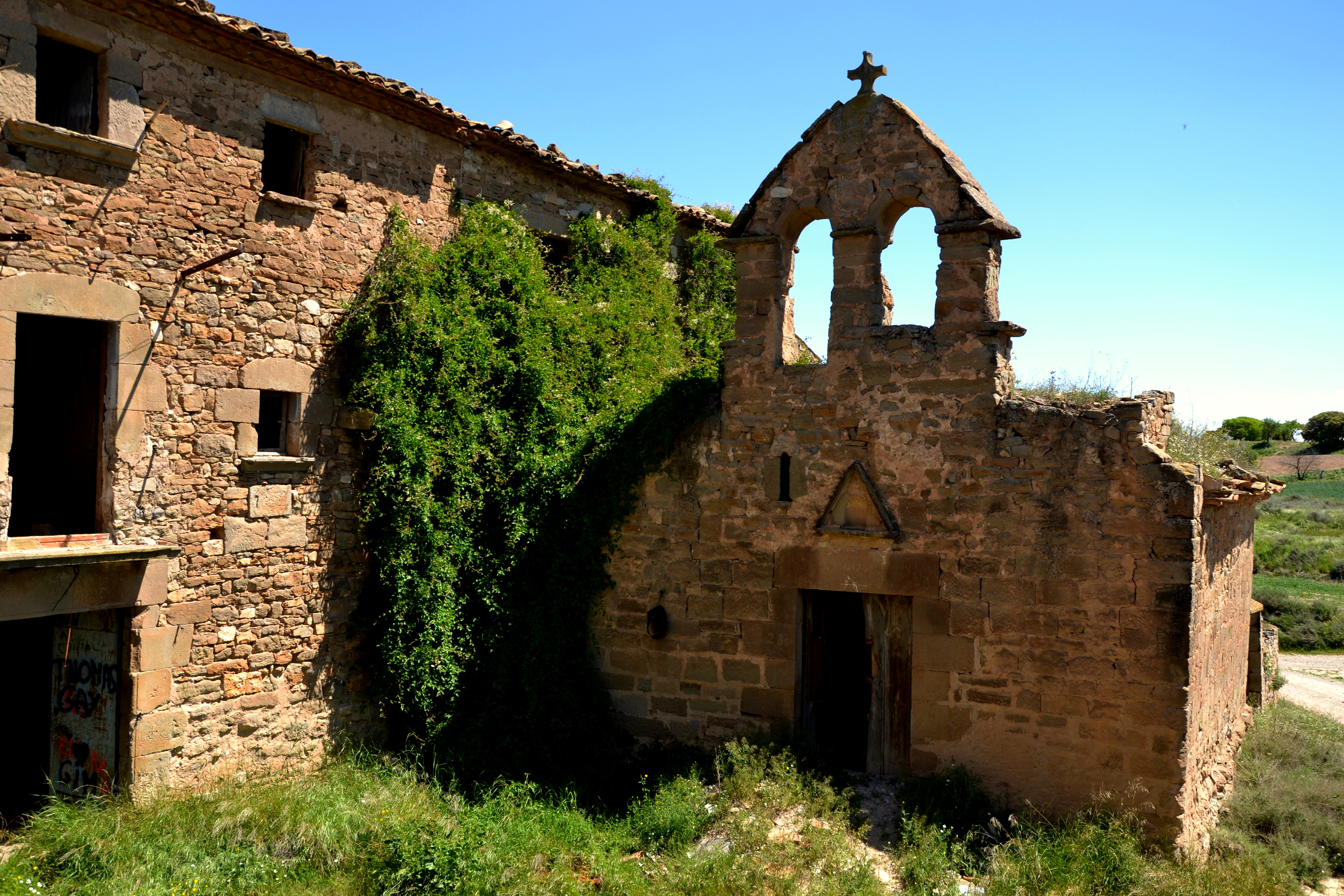
The former church in 2014

Four of Conill's structures are included in the Catalan government's architectural heritage list - its former church, grain-storage pit, boundary cross, and an entrance arch.
