= Second Origin =

2015 Spanish film

Second Origin is a 2015 Spanish film directed by Carles Porta, after an idea of Bigas Luna, co-produced by Produccions Audiovisuals Antàrtida and Ipso Facto Films. It is an adaptation by Bigas Luna, Carles Porta and Carmen Chaves of the well-known novel Mecanoscrit del segon origen by the Spanish writer Manuel de Pedrolo.

== Plot ==
Alba is a 20-year-old girl who lives with her father of English origin in a farmhouse in a place near the city of Lleida. They have lived there for eighteen months, after Alba's mother died of cancer in London and her father's decision to move to his wife's birthplace.

Alba teaches English to Dídac, a 10-year-old-boy who loves football and tractors. One day as Alba is returning home on her motorbike, she sees three boys throwing Dídac into the lake. Without a moment's hesitation, Alba dives in to save him. When they come up to the surface, everything around them has been reduced to ruins by a solar magnetic storm (or, in one version of events, an alien invasion). They believe that they are the only two survivors. Together they must start from scratch to rebuild their lives and those of the whole of humanity. Years later, when they find a third survivor with his own sailing ship, he at first seems to bond with them and their newborn child, Kai, but subsequently betrays their trust and kidnaps Kai. Alba and Dídac's quest to rescue the child leads to a violent dénouement.

== Cast ==
- Rachel Hurd-Wood as Alba
- Andrés Batista as Dídac (boy)
- Ibrahim Mané as Dídac (adult)
- Sergi López as The Man
