= Moses Açan de Zaragua =

Moses Açan de Zaragua (Note: He is also referred to by variations of Moses Ḥazan (משה חזן), Moses Ḥassan (משה חסן), and Moses Nathan (משה נתן). Some sources identify Zaragua as the village of Tàrrega.) (fl. 14th century) was a Catalonian Jewish writer and poet.

He wrote a rhymed treatise on chess in Catalan, which he begins by referring to the creation of the world, and exhorts his fellow man to glorify the Creator by the practise of virtue. Favoring chess, the poem opposes all games of chance, particularly card-playing, which, it declares, would ruin all addicted to it. A manuscript copy of the treatise was once held at El Escorial. It was anonymously translated into Castilian in 1350, under the title Los trabajos de Hercules, y el conde de Lucanor.

He appears to have also written Totza'ot Ḥayyim, a collection of short poems published by Menaḥem ben Yehuda de Lonzano in 1618.
