= Jesús M. Cortes =

- Born: 1976 (age 49–50); Tàrrega
- Education: PhD, University of Granada
- Occupation: Researcher
- Website: https://jesuscortes.info/

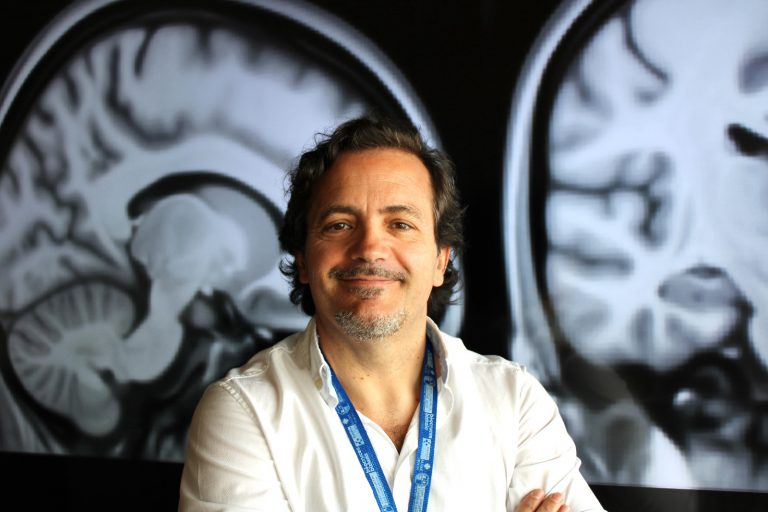
Cortés in 2024

Jesús M. Cortes, is a Spanish neuroscientist and researcher. He holds the position of Ikerbasque Research Professor and leads the Computational Neuroimaging Laboratory at the Biobizkaia Health Research Institute in Bilbao. Courtes is affiliated with the University of the Basque Country. His research focuses on combining statistical physics, computational modeling, and machine learning with multimodal neuroimaging to investigate the structural and functional connectivity of the brain.

== Early life and education ==
Cortes was born in 1976 in Tàrrega, a municipality located in the province of Lleida, Catalonia, Spain. Cortes earned his Bachelor's and PhD degrees in physics from the University of Granada, where he was awarded the Extraordinary Doctoral Prize for the 2004–2005 period. He conducted postdoctoral research at Radboud University Nijmegen in the Netherlands, the Salk Institute in the United States, and the University of Edinburgh in the United Kingdom. He later held a Ramón y Cajal Research Fellowship at the University of Granada.

== Career ==
After completing his doctorate, Cortes focused his research on neuroscience, utilizing statistical methods, data science, and information theory to analyze neuronal data. In 2005, he received a postdoctoral fellowship from the Spanish Ministry to work with Hilbert Kappen at Radboud University Nijmegen in the Netherlands. From 2006 to 2007, he held a Fulbright Postdoctoral Fellowship to conduct research with Terry Sejnowski at the Salk Institute for Biological Studies in the United States. Between 2006 and 2009, he was an EPSRC Postdoctoral Fellow at the University of Edinburgh in the United Kingdom, working under the supervision of Mark van Rossum.

In 2012, Cortes established the Computational Neuroimaging Laboratory at the Biobizkaia Health Research Institute (previously known as BioCruces). His research involves the use of computational methods and machine learning applied to multimodal neuroimaging data to explore the relationships between structural and functional brain connectivity. Since 2012, he has held the position of Ikerbasque Research Professor. Institutional profiles indicate that he has secured more than €8 million in competitive funding, authored over 115 scientific articles (with 90% published in JCR Q1 journals), supervised more than 30 postgraduate students, and delivered over 100 invited lectures internationally.

Cortes has participated in public outreach activities. In 2018, he co-organized the #NeuroTxoko event in Bilbao, which aimed to combine neuroscience outreach with cultural exchange. He has appeared in Spanish media to discuss topics related to neuroscience and Alzheimer's research. In an interview with Radio Euskadi, he referred to Alzheimer's disease as a significant challenge for the global scientific community. He also discussed predictive models of cognitive decline in an interview with NeuroUP, emphasizing the potential role of computational neuroimaging in early detection.

Cortes holds leadership positions in the private healthcare sector alongside his academic roles. In 2022, he was appointed Director of Research at NeuronUP, a digital neurorehabilitation platform. In 2024, he became Chief Science Officer at Biometriks Health, a company focused on digital cognitive metrics and longevity modeling.

== Awards and honors ==
- Extraordinary Doctoral Prize, University of Granada (2004–2005).
- Fulbright Postdoctoral Scholarship (2006).
