= Conejo =

Conejo may refer to:

- Conejo (rapper), rapper based in Los Angeles
- Conejo, California, an unincorporated community
- Conejo, New Mexico, a census-designated place
- Conejo Island, Honduras, in the Gulf of Fonseca
- Conejo Valley, a region in Southern California

== See also ==
- Conejos (disambiguation)
- Conejo (surname), a Spanish surname
