= Tarrega =

Tarrega may refer to:

- Francisco Tárrega, composer and guitarist
- Tàrrega, a city in Catalonia
