= Manuel de Pedrolo =

Catalan writer (1918–1990)

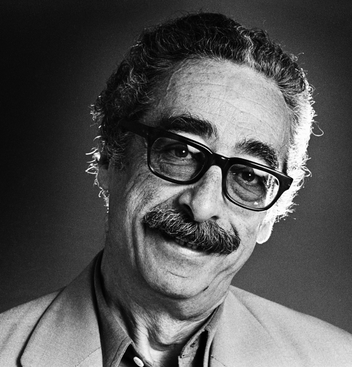
- Born: 1 April 1918; L'Aranyó, Segarra
- Died: 26 June 1990 (aged 72); Barcelona, Spain
- Occupation: Writer
- Writing career
- Notable work: Mecanoscrit del segon origen

Manuel de Pedrolo i Molina (Catalan pronunciation: [mənuˈɛl də pəˈðɾɔlu]; 1918 – 1990) was a Catalan author of novels, short stories, poetry and plays. He is mostly known for his sci-fi novel Mecanoscrit del segon origen (Typescript of the Second Origin).

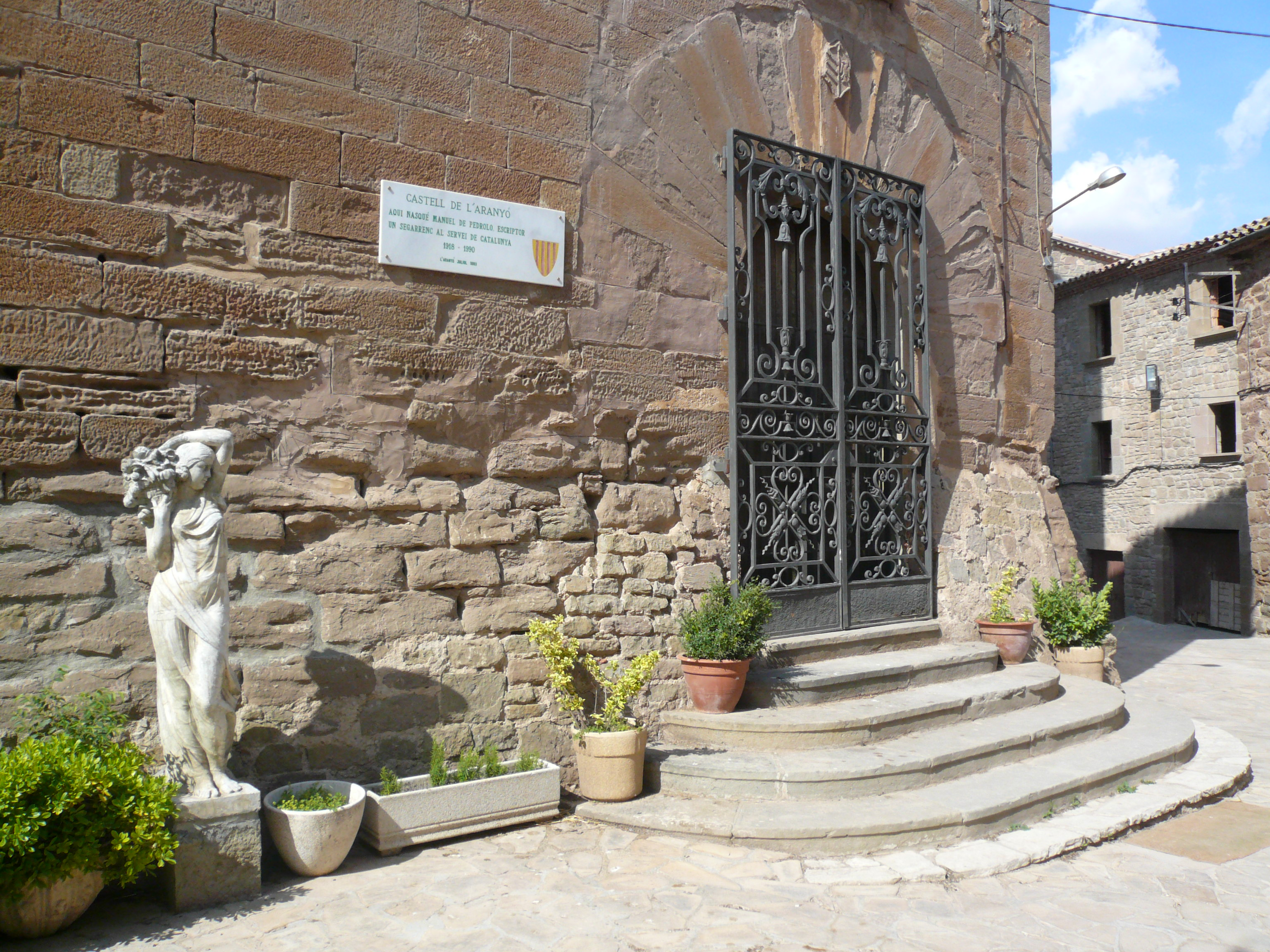
Manuel de Pedrolo's birthplace.

Manuel de Pedrolo was born in 1918 in L'Aranyó, in the Segarra comarca (county), in Catalonia. After the Spanish Civil War he settled in Barcelona, where he worked a variety of jobs while writing in his spare time. From 1974, he devoted himself entirely to literature, creating works, translating, and performing minor editorial tasks. He died in Barcelona in 1990 after a long illness.

Pedrolo explored literary genres including poetry, narrative, short stories, and theatre. His most well-known novel, Mecanoscrit del segon origen, is one of the best-selling books in Catalan literature.

== Biography ==
Born in Castell de l'Aranyó, he belonged to a lower nobility family, the Pedrolo family. His father was a lawyer, although he never practiced. His mother died shortly after the birth of his younger brother Ramon. He studied secondary education in Tàrrega until 1935, when he moved to Barcelona; however, the Spanish Civil War interrupted his studies. In 1943, he married and settled permanently in Barcelona, in a flat-office in Sant Gervasi-Galvany (Carrer de Calvet, 9).

He began his literary career with a book of poems published in 1949. In 1953, he published his first novel, Es vessa una sang fàcil. In 1954, he won the Joanot Martorell Prize. He also contributed to Catalan publications such as Ariel, Canigó, Oriflama, and Serra d'Or. In 1979 he received the Premi d'Honor de les Lletres Catalanes.

A strong defender of an independent and socialist Catalan Countries, He was particularly critical of Catalan political parties before, during, and after the Spanish transition to democracy, and was often considered a reference and intellectual of the Esquerra Independentista. In 1979, he opposed the extradition from France of the Catalan independence activist Manuel Viusà. In 1982, he signed a petition requesting that the five Catalan independence activists of the "Batista i Roca case" be tried in Catalonia instead of Madrid, as was customary at the Audiencia Nacional (Spain).

During the Spanish Civil War, he joined the Confederación Nacional de Trabajo and worked as a teacher in Fígols de les Mines. He served in the artillery branch of the People's Army and was sent to the fronts of Falset, Figueres, and Barcelona.

He was a member of the Associació d'Escriptors en Llengua Catalana, which organized the Mecanoscrit Prize for young writers from 1984 to 1989.

Pedrolo died on 26 June 1990 in Barcelona from cancer at the age of seventy-two.

In 2018, on the centenary of his birth, the Government of Catalonia officially commemorated the Year of Manuel de Pedrolo. The same year, Bel Zaballa published his biography, Manuel de Pedrolo. La llibertat insubornable.

== Theatre ==
According to Graells, Manuel de Pedrolo's theatrical work can be grouped into three periods: the first, from 1951 to 1956; the second, which could be called the "fertile triennium" (1957–1959); and the last, which includes his later production, from 1962 to 1978.

The first period includes the plays Els hereus de la cadira (1954) and La nostra mort de cada dia (1956), which feature realist elements that disappear in his later works. The central period comprises eight plays: Cruma (1957), Pell vella al fons del pou (1957), Homes i No (1957), Situació bis (1958), Algú a l'altre cap de peça (1958), Darrera versió, per ara (1958), Sóc el defecte (1958), and Tècnica de cambra (1959). The third period includes Acompanyo qualsevol cos (1962), Bones notícies de Sister (1962), L'ús de la matèria (1963), La sentència (1966), Aquesta nit tanquem (1973), and D'ara a demà (1977). However, the relationship among these works is less clearly defined.

Rosselló, on the other hand, refers to a central production period between 1957 and 1963 (from Cruma to L'ús de la matèria), consisting of two types of plays: one in which the protagonist rebels against a situation of oppression, and another focused on philosophical issues such as knowledge, communication, fate, or death.

== Translation ==
Beyond his work as a writer, Manuel de Pedrolo also carried out significant translation work, with 42 published translations. His first translations were of poetry from French (Rimbaud, Valéry, Éluard), English (Eliot, Sitwell, Pound), and Italian (Quasimodo). However, most of these translations were never published. Later, he also translated Sandburg, Cummings, Corso, Baudelaire, Campana, Ungaretti, and Saba, among others.

Regarding novel translation, Pedrolo directed the series «La Cua de Palla», which included translators such as Maria Aurèlia Capmany, Ramon Folch i Camarasa, Josep Vallverdú, Joaquim Carbó, Rafael Tasis, Maurici Serrahima i Bofill, Joan Oliver, and Pedrolo himself. Pedrolo is considered the introducer of contemporary North American fiction in Catalonia, with translations of Dos Passos, Salinger, Kerouac, Faulkner, Steinbeck, and Miller, among others.

In 1976, due to vision problems and back pain, Pedrolo abandoned his translation activity to focus exclusively on writing. Some translations completed before this were later published.

== Censorship ==
According to Benassar, Manuel de Pedrolo was the most persecuted writer under Francoist censorship. His works written during this period often experienced publishing delays; with an average delay of eight years for narrative works, five years for poetry, and ten years for theatre. In this period, thirty-three books waited more than ten years before being published; three of them (L'interior és el final, Fronteres interiors, and La nit horitzontal) waited over twenty years.

The first publishers willing to submit Pedrolo's manuscripts through the censors were Arca, Albertí, Moll, and Selecta. Due to the difficulty of finding publishers willing to present their manuscripts to censorship, Pedrolo, like other writers, used the obligation of publishers to print awarded works, as he himself acknowledged in an interview by Josep Maria Espinàs in the magazine Serra d'Or:

These awards —I am told— are no longer for us, those who have a history as novelists. It would be logical for the awards to be contested by younger or new writers, to make a name for themselves and enter the publishing world. But in Catalonia, something strange happens —at least for me: I have the name, but I don't have the publishers. So I need to go to the awards to force the publication of a book. Having published seventeen does not yet allow them to accept book eighteen. […] An award would be justified if, after winning it, the writer could have a normal literary career.

The main criteria applied to censor Pedrolo's work were "what we call Catalanism, political opinions, religion, sexual morality, and indecent language." Additional arguments could be added, as in the case of the novel Un amor fora ciutat (1959), regarding the literary quality of the work: "Por todo ello, y sobre todo por la excelente calidad literaria de la obra, consideramos a esta de gravemente peligrosa y en todo caso como atentatoria a la moral pública, conforme a la reiterada jurisprudencia del Tribunal Supremo sobre el homosexualismo. En consecuencia no debe ser aceptado el depósito y si ser puesta la obra a disposición del Ministerio Fiscal."

"For all these reasons, and above all for the excellent literary quality of the work, we consider it gravely dangerous and, in any case, offensive to public morality, according to the repeated jurisprudence of the Supreme Court regarding homosexuality. Consequently, the deposit should not be accepted and the work should be placed at the disposal of the Ministry of Justice."

== Works ==
Selected works

Novels

- La mà contra l'horitzó (The Hand Against the Horizon)
- Joc brut (Dirty Game)
- Cendra per Martina (Ashes for Martina)
- Totes les bèsties de càrrega (All the Beasts of Burden)
- Mecanoscrit del segon origen (The Second Origin Manuscript)
- Acte de violència (Act of Violence)
- Procés de contradicció suficient (Process of Sufficient Contradiction)
- Crucifeminació (Crucifemination)

Short story collections

- Crèdits humans (Human Credits)
- Trajecte final (Final Route)

Theatre

- Cruma (Cruma)
- Homes i no (Men and No)
- Situació bis (Situation Bis)

Press article collections

- Cal protestar fins i tot quan no serveix de res (We Must Protest Even When It Is Useless)
- Cròniques (Chronicles)
- Abans lluitar i morir que rendir-se (Better to Fight and Die than to Surrender)

Complete works:

- El premi literari i més coses (The Literary Prize and More). Barcelona, Selecta, 1953. Valencia, Edicions Bromera, 1990.
- Es vessa una sang fàcil (Easy Blood Spilled). Barcelona, Albertí, 1954, 1964. Edicions La Magrana, 1986.
- Mister Chase, podeu sortir (Mister Chase, You May Exit). Barcelona, Albertí, 1955.
- Estrictament personal (Strictly Personal). Barcelona, Editorial Selecta, 1955.
- Domicili provisional (Provisional Residence). Palma, Editorial Moll, 1956. Barcelona, Edicions La Magrana, 1982. Barcanova, 1990.
- Un món per a tothom (A World for Everyone). Barcelona, Albertí, 1956.
- Les finestres s'obren de nit (Windows Open at Night). Palma, Moll, 1957.
- Violació de límits (Violation of Limits). Barcelona, Albertí, 1957.
- Crèdits humans (Human Credits). Barcelona, Selecta, 1957.
- L'inspector arriba tard (The Inspector Arrives Late). Palma, Moll, 1960. Barcelona, Edicions La Magrana, 1988.
- Una selva com la teva (A Jungle Like Yours). Barcelona, Edicions Destino, 1960.
- La mà contra l'horitzó (The Hand Against the Horizon). Barcelona, Nova Terra, 1961. La Llar del Llibre, 1985.
- Balanç fins a la matinada (Balance Until Dawn). Barcelona, Selecta, 1963, 1984.
- Cendra per Martina (Ashes for Martina). Barcelona, Proa, 1965, 1980. Kapel, 1982.
- Joc brut (Dirty Game). Barcelona, Edicions 62, 1965.
- Avui es parla de mi (Today People Talk About Me). Barcelona, Selecta, 1966.
- Elena de segona mà (Second-Hand Elena). Barcelona, Selecta, 1967. Edicions 62, 1985.
- M'enterro en els fonaments (I Bury Myself in the Foundations). Barcelona, Proa, 1967.
- Totes les bèsties de càrrega (All the Beasts of Burden). Barcelona, Edicions 62, 1967.
- A cavall de dos cavalls (Riding Two Horses). Barcelona, Alfaguara, 1967.
- Entrada en blanc (Entry in Blank). Barcelona, Cadí, 1968.
- Solució de continuïtat (Break in Continuity). Palma, Moll, 1968.
- Un camí amb Eva (A Path with Eva). Barcelona, Llibres de Sinera, 1968. Edicions 62, 1975, 1988.
- Se'n va un estrany (A Stranger Leaves). Barcelona, Llibres de Sinera, 1968. Edicions 62, 1976, 1988.
- Falgueres informa (Falgueres Reports). Barcelona, Llibres de Sinera, 1968. Edicions 62, 1979, 1989.
- Mossegar-se la cua (Biting One's Tail). Barcelona, Edicions 62, 1968, 1982.
- Un amor fora ciutat (A Love Outside the City). Barcelona: Aymà, 1970.
- Nou pams de terra (Nine Palms of Earth). Barcelona: Pòrtic, 1971.
- Si són roses, floriran (If They Are Roses, They Will Bloom). Barcelona: Nova Terra, 1971, 1977. Edicions 62, 1980. La Llar del Llibre, 1985.
- Situació analítica (Analytical Situation). Barcelona: Edicions 62, 1971, 1977, 1989.
- Introducció a l'ombra (Introduction to the Shadow). Barcelona: Proa, 1972, 1985.
- Cops de bec a Pasadena (Beak Blows in Pasadena). Barcelona: Nova Terra, 1972, 1975. Edicions 62, 1980.
- Pas de ratlla (Step Over the Line). Barcelona: Proa, 1972.
- Des d'uns ulls de dona (From a Woman's Eyes). Barcelona: Edicions 62, 1972, 1979. Avui, 1995.
- Unes mans plenes de sol (Hands Full of Sun). Barcelona: Edicions 62, 1972.
- Espais de fecunditat irregulars (Spaces of Irregular Fertility). Barcelona: Proa, 1973, 1982
- Viure a la intempèrie (Living in the Open). Barcelona: Nova Terra, 1974.
- L'ordenació dels maons (The Arrangement of Bricks). Barcelona: Edicions 62, 1974, 1979, 1991
- Algú que no hi havia de ser (Someone Who Should Not Have Been There). Barcelona: Proa, 1974.
- Text/càncer (Text/Cancer). Barcelona: Dopesa, 1974.
- Mecanoscrit del segon origen (The Second Origin Manuscript). Barcelona: Edicions 62, 1974, 1982, 1986.
- L'interior és el final (The Interior Is the End). Barcelona: Edicions 62, 1974.
- El temps a les venes (Time in the Veins). Barcelona: Edicions 62, 1974.
- Cinc cordes (Five Strings). Barcelona: Edicions 62, 1974.
- Internacional Setting (International Setting). Barcelona: Edicions 62, 1974.
- Acte de violència (Act of Violence). Barcelona: Edicions 62, 1975, 1983, 1984, 1988.
- Milions d'ampolles buides (Millions of Empty Bottles). Barcelona: Laia, 1975.
- Sòlids en suspensió (Solids in Suspension). Barcelona: Nova Terra, 1975. Edicions 62, 1981.
- Detall d'una acció rutinària (Detail of a Routine Action). Barcelona: Galba, 1975.
- Trajecte final (Final Route). Barcelona: Edicions 62, 1975, 1982. El Observador, 1991. Barcanova, 1992.
- Contes fora recull (Stories Outside the Collection). Barcelona: Edicions 62, 1975.
- Perquè ha mort una noia (Because a Girl Died). Barcelona: Galba, 1976.
- Tocats pel foc (Touched by Fire). Barcelona: Edicions 62, 1976, 1983.
- S'alcen veus del soterrani (Voices Rise from the Basement). Barcelona: Edicions 62, 1976, 1979, 1991.
- Procés de contradicció suficient (Process of Sufficient Contradiction). Barcelona: Edicions 62, 1976.
- Les portes del passat (The Doors of the Past). Barcelona: Laia, 1977.
- La paraula dels botxins (The Word of the Executioners). Barcelona: Laia, 1977.
- Pols nova de runes velles (New Dust of Old Ruins). Barcelona: Edicions 62, 1977, 1992.
- Hem posat les mans a la crònica (We Put Our Hands in the Chronicle). Barcelona: Edicions 62, 1977.
- Lectura a banda i banda de paret (Reading Across the Wall). Barcelona: Proa, 1977.
- L'ús de la matèria (The Use of Matter). Barcelona: Edicions 62, 1977.
- Les fronteres interiors (Interior Borders). Barcelona: Laia, 1978.
- Cartes a Jones Street (Letters to Jones Street). Barcelona: Edicions 62, 1978, 1992.
- Anònim I (Anonymous I). Barcelona: Proa, 1978.
- D'esquerra a dreta, respectivament (From Left to Right, Respectively). Barcelona: Edicions 62, 1978.
- S'han deixat les claus sota l'estora (The Keys Were Left Under the Mat). Barcelona: Edicions 62, 1978, 1979.
- La nit horitzontal (The Horizontal Night). Barcelona: Laia, 1979.
- Aquesta matinada i potser per sempre (This Dawn and Perhaps Forever). Barcelona: Galba, 1979.
- Baixeu a recules i amb les mans alçades (Step Backwards with Hands Up). Barcelona: La Magrana, 1979.
- "Conjectures" de Daniel Bastida (Daniel Bastida's "Conjectures"). Barcelona: Edicions 62, 1980, 1993.
- Successimultani (Successimultaneous). Barcelona: Laia, 1980. Grup de Llibre, 1982. Pleniluni, 1991, Pagès editors, 2006.
- Anònim II (Anonymous II). Barcelona: Edicions 62, 1981.
- Anònim III (Anonymous III). Barcelona: Edicions 62, 1981.
- Anna (Anna). Olot: bibliophile edition, 1982.
- Apòcrif u: Oriol (Apocrypha I: Oriol). Barcelona: Edicions 62, 1982.
- Exemplar d'arxiu, únicament persones autoritzades (Archive Copy, Authorized Persons Only). Barcelona: La Magrana, 1982.
- Apòcrif dos: Tina (Apocrypha II: Tina). Barcelona: Edicions 62, 1983.
- No hi fa res si el comte-duc no va caure del cavall a Tàrrega (It Doesn't Matter If the Count-Duke Didn't Fall from the Horse in Tàrrega). Barcelona: Laia, 1984. La Llar del Llibre, 1990.
- Apòcrif tres: Verònica (Apocrypha III: Veronica). Barcelona: Edicions 62, 1984.
- Domicili permanent (Permanent Residence). Barcelona: La Magrana, 1984.
- Apòcrif quatre: Tilly (Apocrypha IV: Tilly). Barcelona: Edicions 62, 1985.
- Joc tapat (Covered Game). Valencia: Edicions Tres i Quatre, 1985.
- Caus a cada cantonada (Holes on Every Corner). Edicions 62, 1985.
- Crucifeminació (Crucifemination). Barcelona: Edicions 62, 1986.
- Patologies diversament obscures (Diversely Obscure Pathologies). Barcelona: La Magrana, 1986.
- La creació de la realitat, punt i seguit (The Creation of Reality, Full Stop). Barcelona: Edicions 62, 1987.
- Tot o nul (All or Nothing). Barcelona: Edicions 62, 1988.
- Disset contes i una excepció (Seventeen Stories and One Exception). Barcelona: Edicions 62, 1990.
- Anna (Anna). With illustrations by Miquel Plana. Lleida: Serveis Territorials de Cultura de la Generalitat a Lleida, 1990.
- Obres púbiques (Public Works). Barcelona: Edicions 62, 1991.
- Tants interlocutors a Bassera (So Many Interlocutors in Bassera). Edicions 62, 1992.
- L'inspector fa tard (The Inspector Arrives Late). Cercle de Lectors, 1993.
- Doble o res (Double or Nothing). Barcelona: Edicions 62, 1997.
- Us convida a l'acte. Recopilació de Xavier Garcia. Recull de 50 poemes visuals eròtics (You Are Invited to the Event. Compiled by Xavier Garcia. Collection of 50 Erotic Visual Poems). Lleida: Pagès Editors, 2000.
- Cal protestar fins i tot quan no serveix de res (We Must Protest Even When It Is Useless). Barcelona: Edicions El Jonc, 2000.
- El principi de tot (The Beginning of Everything). Barcelona: Comanegra, 2017, with illustrations by Pep Boatella.
- La terra prohibida (The Forbidden Land). Barcelona: Comanegra, 2017, with foreword by Patrícia Gabancho.
- Infant dels grans (Child of the Adults). Barcelona: Comanegra, 2018.
- La terra prohibida (volum 2) (The Forbidden Land, Volume 2). Barcelona: Comanegra, 2018, with epilogue by Núria Cadenes.
- Visita a la senyora Soler (Visit to Mrs. Soler). Juneda: Fonoll, 2022.

== Awards and recognition ==
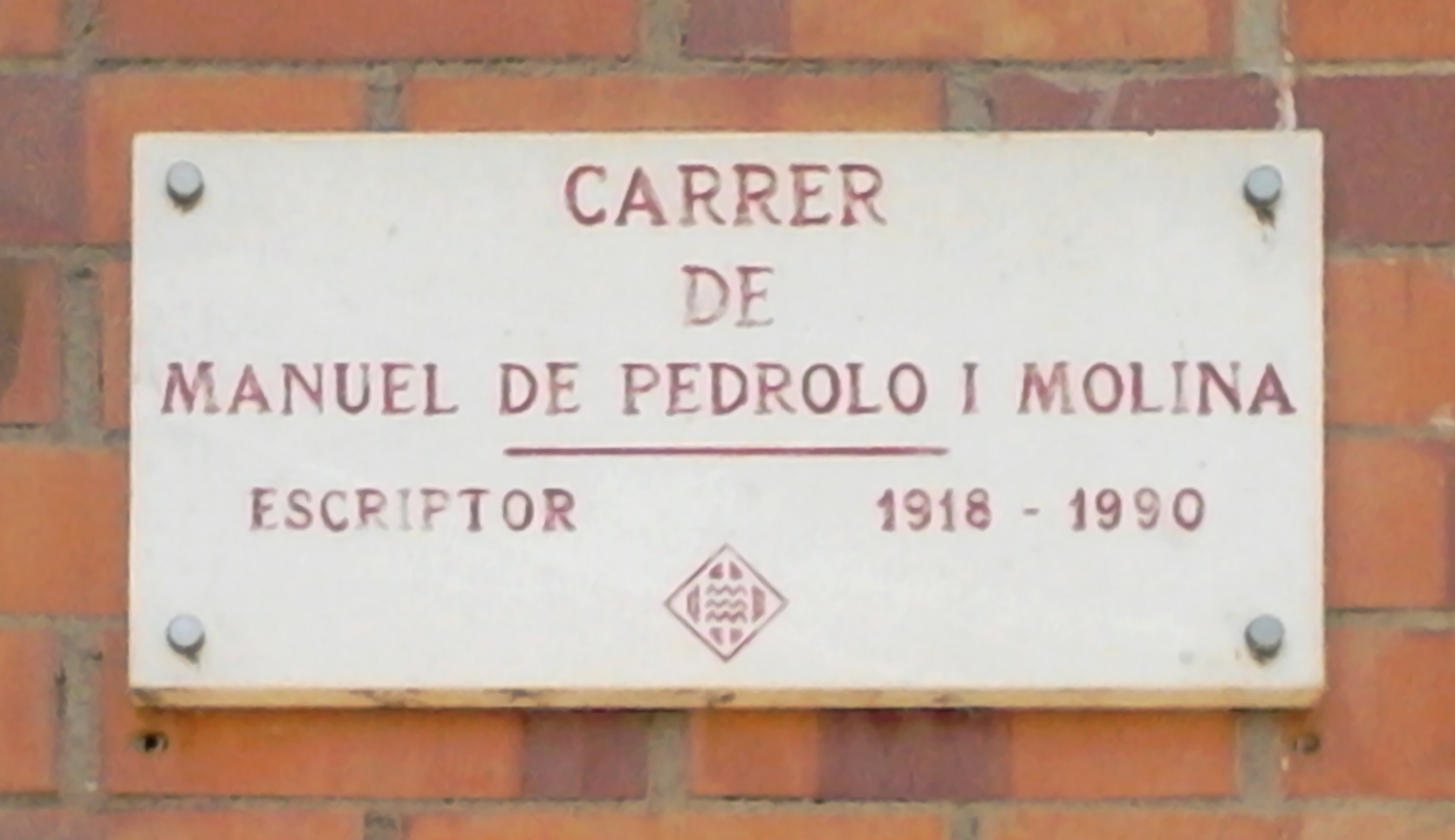
Street dedicated to Manuel de Pedrolo in Girona.

- Joanot Martorell Prize, 1954, for Estrictament personal (Strictly Personal).
- Víctor Català Prize, 1956, for Crèdits humans (Human Credits).
- Sant Jordi Prize, 1962, for Balanç fins a la matinada (Balance Until Dawn).
- Gold Letter, 1966, for Cendra per Martina (Ashes for Martina).
- Serra d'Or Critics Prize for Novel, 1968, for Totes les bèsties de càrrega (All the Beasts of Burden).
- Prudenci Bertrana Prize, 1968, for Estat d'excepció (State of Exception), published in 1975 as Acte de violència (Act of Violence).
- Serra d'Or Critics Prize for Novel, 1972, for Situació analítica (Analytical Situation).
- Serra d'Or Critics Prize for Short Stories, 1975, for Contes i narracions (Stories and Narratives, second volume).
- Serra d'Or Critics Prize for Novel, 1977, for Procés de contradicció suficient (Process of Sufficient Contradiction).
- Honor Prize of Catalan Letters, 1979.
- Serra d'Or Critics Prize for Narrative, 1991, for Disset contes i una excepció (Seventeen Stories and One Exception).
- Serra d'Or Critics Prize for Biographies and Memoirs, 1992, for Darrers diaris inèdits. Blocs 1988-1990 (Last Unpublished Diaries. Blogs 1988–1990).
- Streets named in his honor in Girona and Sant Cugat del Vallès.

== Work ==
Pedrolo experimented with all kinds of innovations in his novels, in which he always depicted, with strong realism, the individual navigating human qualities and contradictions. He made some approaches to Absurdist literature. He was an ambitious writer and produced a large number of works spanning numerous subgenres, from realistic novels to symbolically idealistic, police, and psychological novels. Despite exploring diverse styles, Pedrolo maintained high quality in all his works, remaining faithful to his ideas and refusing to publish in Spanish, even if it could have been more profitable. He skillfully combined and innovated various styles throughout his oeuvre, always reflecting his own thinking and personality.

Despite being considered one of the most ambitious writers in Catalan, having cultivated virtually all literary genres, Manuel de Pedrolo is especially known for his vast production of prose, with more than 72 novels published between 1949 and 1985, many of which were detective novels. Most of them were thoroughly censored under the following terms: "Catalanism, political opinions, religion, sexual morality and indecorous language". He also translated into Catalan works by John Dos Passos, William Faulkner and Jean-Paul Sartre. Throughout his life, he had several run-ins with Spanish fascists around censorship issues. He also received many awards and was bestowed with the highest honors in Catalan literature.

One of Pedrolo's most famous works is Mecanoscrit del segon origen ("Typescript of the Second Origin"). First published in 1974, it became the most broadly disseminated Catalan fiction book in the following decade, with 26 editions and over 270,000 copies sold by 1986. The post-apocalyptic novel follows two children, Alba and Didac, as they attempt to rebuild human civilisation after an alien invasion. The story follows them as they travel through Catalonia, France, and Italy, preserving culture and knowledge, before becoming the 'Adam and Eve' of a new world. For a long period of time it was compulsory reading in Catalan schools.
