= El Talladell =

- Decentralized municipal entity
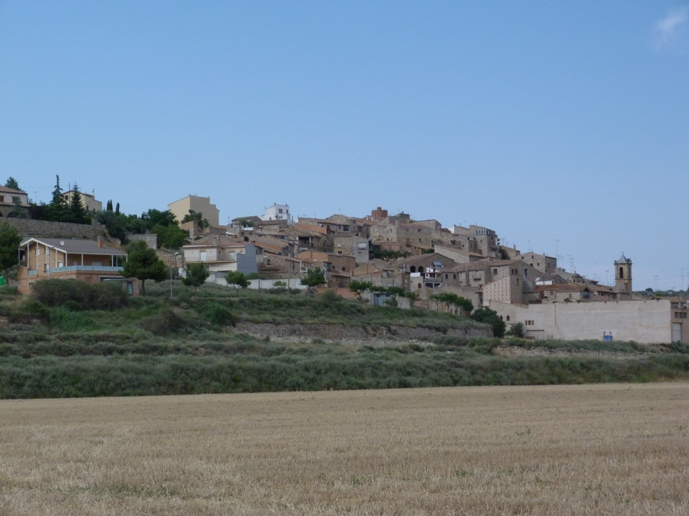

- Location within Province of Lleida Location within Catalonia Location within Spain
- Coordinates: 41°38′58″N 1°10′1″E
- Country: Spain
- Community: Catalonia
- Province: Lleida
- Municipality: Tàrrega
- Elevation: 394 m (1,293 ft)

Population
  - Total: 231

El Talladell is a locality and decentralized municipal entity located in the municipality of Tàrrega, in Province of Lleida province, Catalonia, Spain. As of 2020, it has a population of 231.

== Geography ==
El Talladell is located 58km east of Lleida.
