= Typescript of the Second Origin =

1974 novel by Manuel de Pedrolo

- First edition
- Author: Manuel de Pedrolo
- Original title: Mecanoscrit del segon origen
- Translator: Sara Martín Alegre
- Language: Catalan
- Subject: Dystopia
- Genre: Novel, science fiction, young adult fiction
- Publisher: El Trapezi
- Publication date: 1974
- Publication place: Spain

Typescript of the Second Origin (Catalan: Mecanoscrit del segon origen) is a science fiction novel written by Manuel de Pedrolo in 1974, that had a great success and that has become one of the best-selling books of Catalan literature. The work is divided into 6 chapters, the first 5 of them having a similar extension and being called Quaderns (Catalan word for Notebooks) and the last of them being short and entitled «És l'Alba la mare de la humanitat actual?» (Is Alba the mother of current humanity?). The novel was published in English in 2017 by Wesleyan University Press.

It was brought to television by a very successful TV series produced and displayed by TV3, and in 2015 it was adapted for the big screen with the film Segon origen.

== Plot ==
In this novel de Pedrolo tells the story of Alba and Dídac, 14 and 9 years old respectively, who live in a Catalan town called Benaura. They become the only survivors on Earth after extraterrestrials destroy almost all humanity. Before the invasion, Dídac is attacked by some neb from the town because he is black. He falls into the water, and Alba, who sees the scene, jumps in to save him. Being under the water protects them from destruction.

During the following four years, they survive in a destroyed world and face many and varied troubles and difficulties that make them mature quickly. They realise the importance of knowledge by keeping and reading books. They run away from the pestilence and take refuge in a farmhouse, where they find dead people and survivors. They walk by the ruins of Barcelona and the Mediterranean Sea. They learn from everything that happens to them (illnesses, enemy defense) and from the information they collect.

The book explores the relationship between the two children and the recreation of a world as a utopia. The narration is structured in chapters that always start the same way: by mentioning Alba's age and her virginity.

The narrator is omniscient and uses much description.

== Translations ==
The novel has been translated to Spanish (1984), to Dutch (1986), to Basque (1989), to Galician (1989), to French (1993), to Romanian (2000), to Portuguese (2004) and to Italian (2011). In November 2016, the Council of Lleida financed the first translation into English, which was published in the United States in 2017.

== Bibliography ==
- de Pedrolo, Manuel (2008). Ballús, Carme (ed.). Mecanoscrit del segon origen. Barcelona: Educaula. ISBN 9788492672356. OCLC 690388569.

== See also ==
- Second Origin: film adaptation.
