= Borges (company) =

Spanish food company

Borges International Group
- Type: Public
- Industry: Food
- Founded: 1896; 130 years ago
- Founder: Pont Creus
- Headquarters: Tàrrega, Catalonia, Spain
- Key people: Antonio Pont Amenos
- Products: Food
- Revenue: 670 million euros
- Number of employees: 1100
- Website: www.borges.es

Borges International Group (Catalan pronunciation: [ˈbɔɾʒəs]) is a Spanish food company based in Tàrrega, Catalonia, Spain. It was founded in 1896.

Borges produces a range of olive oil, nuts, dried fruits, olives, vinegars. The company exports products to over 120 countries and offers private-label production services. The company's headquarters are located in Reus and Tàrrega (100 km from Barcelona), with 1100 employees, turnover of 670 million euros.

== History ==
In 1896, the couple Antonio Pont Pont and Dolores Creus Casanovas founded Industrias Pont in Tárrega (Lérida) for the sale of almonds and olives, typical products of the region.

In 1914, the industrialization of the group began with the acquisition of an oil mill to obtain olive oil.

In 1985, the first international subsidiary was created in California for the supply of walnuts and almonds.

== International presence ==
The company has an important international activity, not in vain approximately 75% of the group's sales are made abroad. The company is one of the world leaders in the olive oil, vinegar, walnut, olive and almond markets.

Borges Agricultural & Industrial Edible Oils owns production and bottling facilities for its Modena Vinegar in Marzaglia, Italy, and Cairo, Egypt, as well as an olive oil filtering and production facility in Sfax, Tunisia. Borges Agriculture and Industrial Nuts owns a processing plant in Glenn, California.

The company belongs to the Leading Brands of Spain Forum.

Despite the Russian invasion of Ukraine in 2022 and the imposition of widespread international sanctions, Borges has continued its business operations in Russia. The company's ongoing presence in the Russian market has drawn criticism for indirectly supporting Russia's economy during its aggression against Ukraine. This situation has raised ethical concerns and questions about corporate accountability, particularly as Russia remains under global scrutiny for its violations of international law and humanitarian principles.
