= Telecinco (Portugal) =

Proposed Portuguese television channel

Telecinco was a proposed fifth television channel that was going to be launched in conjunction with digital terrestrial television in Portugal, and was set to become the first private terrestrial TV startion to launch since TVI. It was the main bidder out of two, a television project operated by established local professionals, for such a network, contrary to competing channels which were backed by existing companies.

The channel's license was rejected before approval and would lead to a long period of indecision.

== History ==
=== Background ===
In October 2005, Portugal Telecom, owner of TV Cabo, announced its intention to open a generalist television network. The channel would target an audience of 1,2 million viewers who had cable but had competing operators, with TV Cabo distributing the signal to all providers. PT president Miguel Horta e Costa attempted to use the channel as a platform to lure more subscribers to TV Cabo. The channel was to be finance by advertising.

On 23 November 2005, Joaquim Oliveira, the new owner of Lusomundo, shows his interest for a television license. It was intended to be digital from the outset, as the ITU considered that an analog license was outdated. The plan for the channel would start in 2006, when the government would start work on the DTT platform.

=== The tender ===
In January 2008, the Portuguese government, motivated by the start of digital terrestrial television, began a tender for a fifth generalist TV channel, set to start in the first half of 2008. The first companies to be interested were Controlinveste (Jornal de Notícias, Diário de Notícias, O Jogo) and Cofina (Correio da Manhã, Record). Francisco Pinto Balsemão, owner of Impresa (and SIC), criticized the government's posture under the grounds that a fifth channel could destabilize the advertising market. By April, ZON was studying the possibility of setting up a bid. The company had shareholders interested in the project. Regardless of the winner, it was projected that the fifth channel would end up becoming an alternative to the four extant terrestrial channels.

In July, ZON had continued analyzing its bid for the fifth channel, becoming the third company to do so. If ZON were to win the bid, it would also have an advantage, as the channel would be available on the largest cable network.

In October, Público invited four personalities for their ideas of what the channel would air:

- Sebastião Lima Rego: The schedule would start at 8am with a morning show. From 10am to 1pm, it would air documentaries and game shows. After the 1pm news service, a more localized service would start at 1:45pm, followed by a long afternoon program at 2:30pm, which would enable viewer participation. At 6pm, a youth program with would air, followed by a national telenovela at 7pm. After the news, a program about books was suggested for 8:45pm, followed by a current affairs report at 8:50pm. Prime time would consist of a live music show, followed by a feature film at 11:30pm.
- Rui Zink: He defended news services at 8am, 12pm, 5pm and 8pm. There were to be two telenovelas, a historical one at 7pm and a contemporary one at 8:30pm. Entertainment would run from 9am to 12pm and from 1pm to 3pm. There would be movies at 3pm and 10pm, as well as programming for children at 6pm and a cultural documentary at midnight.
- Miguel Esteves Cardoso: His idea was more tongue-in-cheek, delivering "truth in real time". Mornings would be dedicated to real-life documentaries, afternoons for the elderly, with movies, and evenings with football matches, which he called "the essence of television".
- Simone de Oliveira: The morning slot would be aimed at children, with a strong cultural emphasis. After the first news service at 10am, an entertainment show without being what she called "a reality show" would follow at 10:30am. After the 1pm news, a telenovela would air at 2pm, followed at 3pm by an entertainment program which would follow specific topics. The second telenovela at 6pm would be followed at 7pm by a game show. After the 8pm news, a short program about poetry and poems would precede the 9pm series, akin to RTP's productions. At 10pm, a music show would air, followed at 11:30pm by a movie. She defended that all newscasts should never exceed an hour in length and would end with an item related to arts.

=== Rangel enters the ZON bid ===
Around 1 November 2008, Emídio Rangel showed his interest for joining the ZON bid, aiming to counter the argument that a fifth television channel would destabilize the advertising market. He had been appointed as an external consultant, but that the ideas to apply were still secret. Portugal Telecom, which by then had become ZON's competitor (following a spin-off the previous year), refused to comment.

=== ZON and Telecinco ===
In January 2009, ZON, until then the only candidate, received competition from Telecinco SA. The company was registered on 21 January. Its staff consisted of former journalist Carlos Pinto Coelho, sports journalist David Borges, producer Ana Rangel (daughter of Emídio Rangel), director João Salvado and former CDS-PP deputee and economist Augusto Boucinha. The project already had a website and Carlos Pinto Coelho, one of its fitures, was keen on the idea that it would provide a public service alternative to the two established private channels, which had to be used at 100%. Its facilities were located at Castilho Street in Lisbon, where Ana Rangel's production company was located. ZON, on its end, wanted to put the channel on air in mid-2010.

=== Judicial problems ===
Shortly after Telecinco was presented, on 23 January, the company complained against ZON's plan for the fifth channel, which Margarida Lima, Telecinco's manager, thought to lead to ZON's exclusion. Telecinco reiterated that the failure would be fixed if ZON changed its documents. This led to the company initiating pressure for the removal of the rival bid, which ZON refused to comment. On 20 February, both companies started delivering their deliberations after being rejected by ERC. The two bidders sent further explanations on the afternoon of 9 March.

On 24 March, ERC pointed out that Telecinco wouldn't operate on the grounds of lack of economic viability, whereas ZON lacked the necessary human resources, which were essential legal requirements to operate. The process to enable the fifth channel would only continue if the case was taken to the courts. The primary cause for the exclusion was Telecinco demanding a viewership share of 20 to 25% (which would mean surpassing SIC right from the beginning) and an ad revenue of €65 million in its first year on air. ZON's failure was justified on the hiring of an external technical staff of 59.

As of October, the judicial process for the fifth channel was still suspended, with Telecinco suffering from six months of damage due to inaction from ERC, accumulating €1 million in debt, due to the delay in the process. ZON, the rival bid, and PT, responsible for the terrestrial transmitter network, both refused to comment. The affair was already finished for ERC, unless the court ruled in favor of one of the two bidders. On 27 October, the Lisbon Administrative Tribunal approved Telecinco's precautionary message, blocked from its bid, while filing an appeal to ERC. By early December, a judicial decision was pending.

On 4 May 2010, Carlos Pinto Coelho, president of Telecinco, said that the company was not yet notified of a judicial decision. A 29 April ruling revoked the sentence that suspended ERC's decision to exclude the two bidding candidates, and that the fifth channel would only be justified if the government started a new

On 6 March 2014, ZON Optimus left the bid for the fifth channel, which was frozen for five years.
