= Santa Maria de Montmagastrell =

- Locality
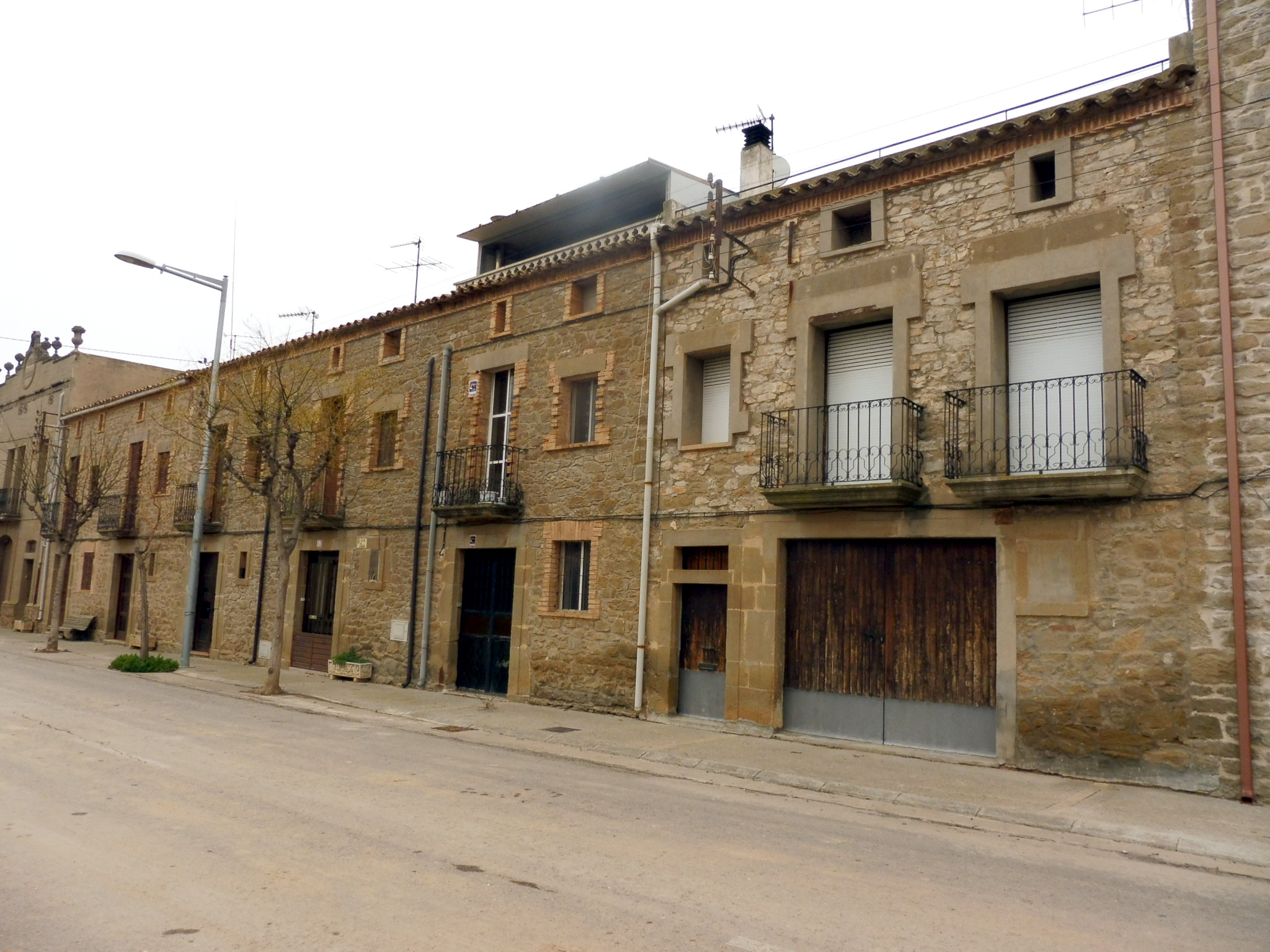

- Location within Province of Lleida Location within Catalonia Location within Spain
- Coordinates: 41°43′13″N 1°6′22″E
- Country: Spain
- Community: Catalonia
- Province: Lleida
- Municipality: Tàrrega
- Elevation: 320 m (1,050 ft)

Population
  - Total: 51

Santa Maria de Montmagastrell is a locality located in the municipality of Tàrrega, in Province of Lleida province, Catalonia, Spain. As of 2020, it has a population of 51.

== Geography ==
Santa Maria de Montmagastrell is located 63km east-northeast of Lleida.
