= Conejos =

Conejos is the Spanish term for "rabbits". It may refer to:

- Conejos River
- Conejos, Colorado
- Conejos County, Colorado

== See also ==
- Conejo (disambiguation)
