= Riudovelles =

- Locality
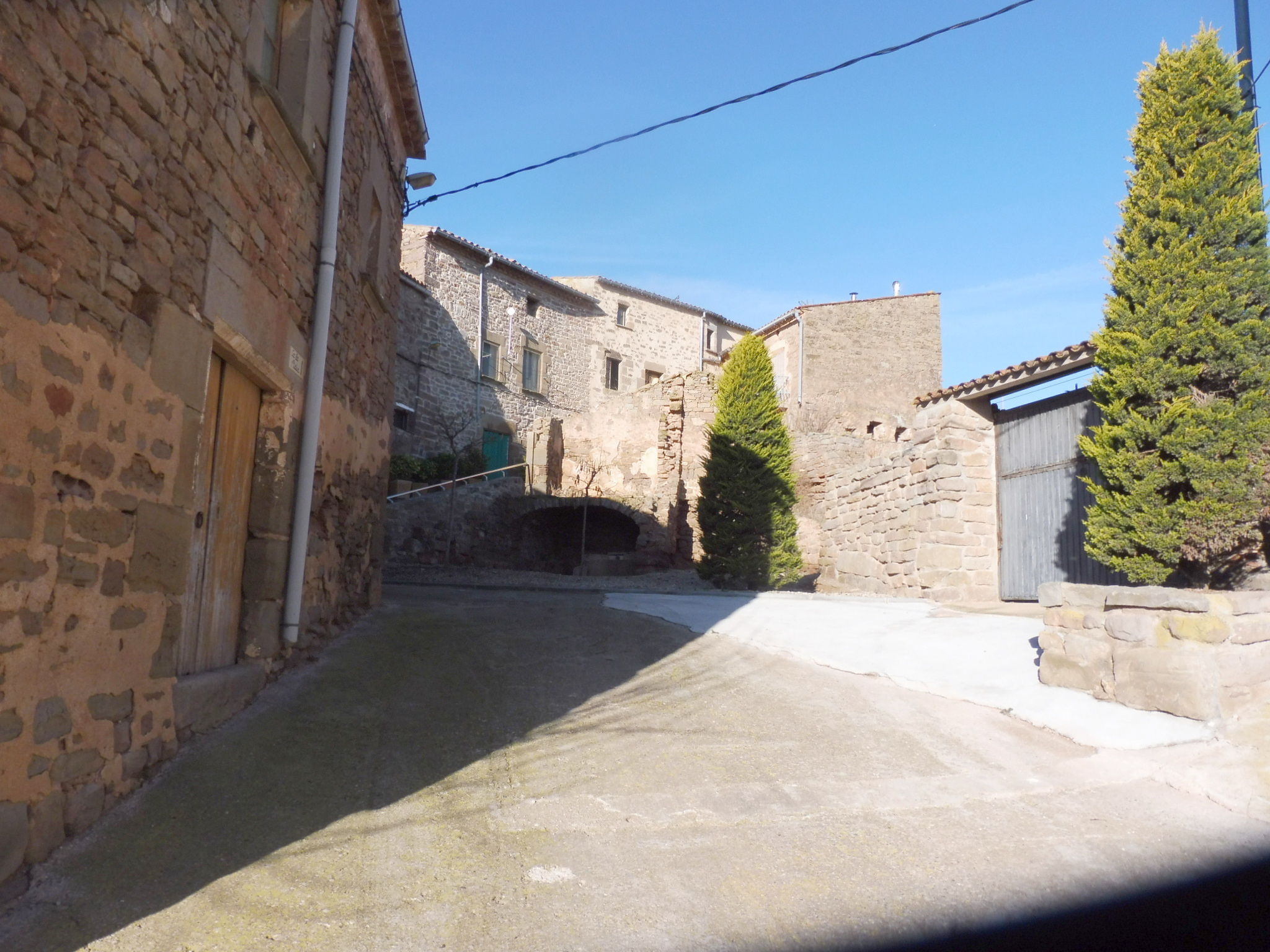

- Location within Province of Lleida Location within Catalonia Location within Spain
- Coordinates: 41°42′51″N 1°11′41″E
- Country: Spain
- Community: Catalonia
- Province: Lleida
- Municipality: Tàrrega
- Elevation: 405 m (1,329 ft)

Population
  - Total: 10

Riudovelles is a hamlet located in the municipality of Tàrrega, in Province of Lleida province, Catalonia, Spain. As of 2020, it has a population of 10.

== Geography ==
Riudovelles is located 63km east of Lleida.
