= Claravalls =

- Locality
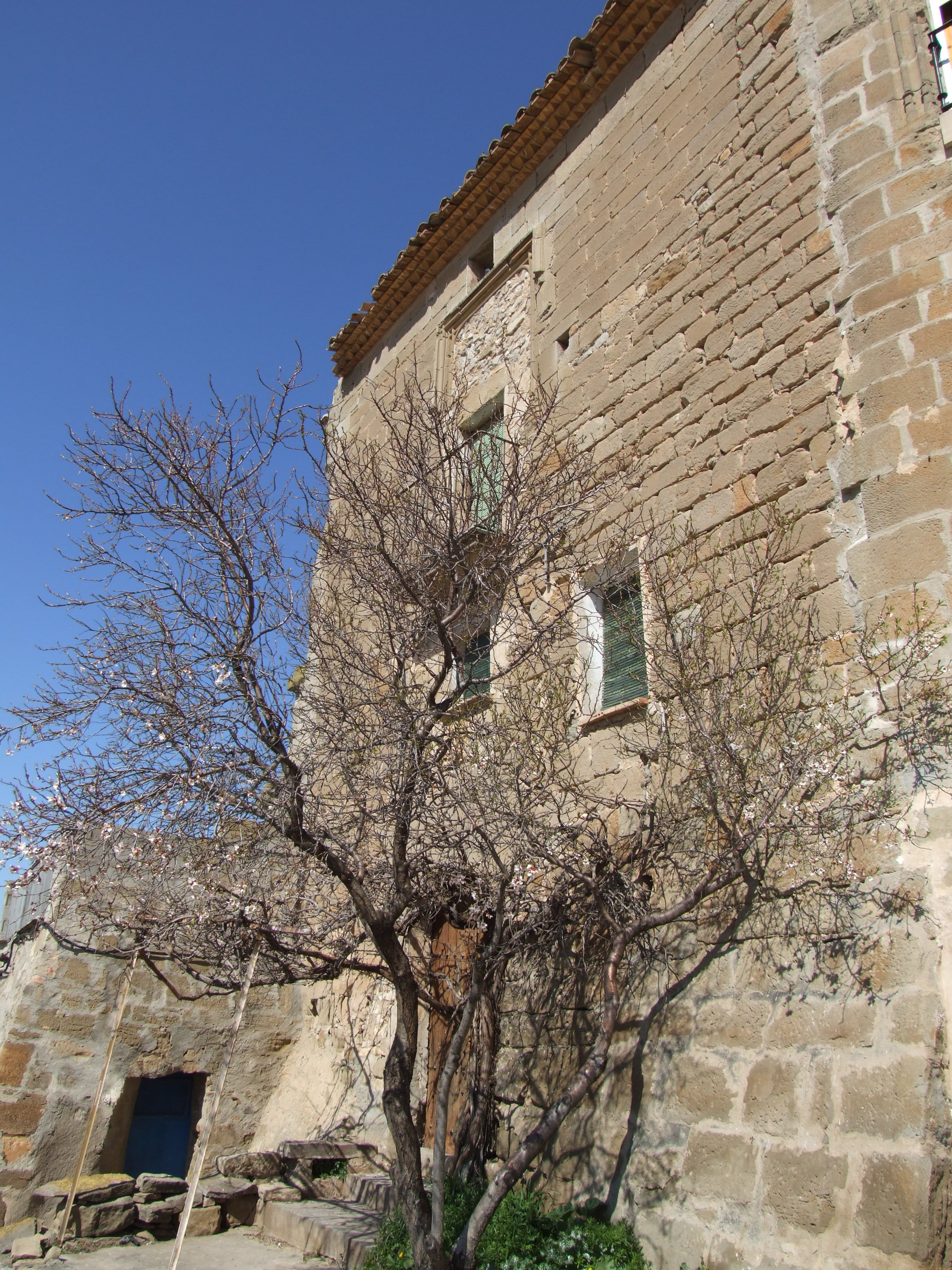

- Location within Province of Lleida Location within Catalonia Location within Spain
- Coordinates: 41°42′12″N 1°7′30″E
- Country: Spain
- Community: Catalonia
- Province: Lleida
- Municipality: Tàrrega
- Elevation: 336 m (1,102 ft)

Population
  - Total: 120

Claravalls is a locality located in the municipality of Tàrrega, in Province of Lleida province, Catalonia, Spain. As of 2020, it has a population of 120.

== Geography ==
Claravalls is located 60km east of Lleida.
