= Conejo (surname) =

Conejo (Spanish pronunciation: [ko'nexo]) is a Spanish language surname from the Spanish word for rabbit. Notable people with the name include:

- Abel Conejo (1998), Spanish footballer
- Antonio García Conejo (1971), Mexican politician
- Gabelo Conejo (1960), Costa Rican former professional footballer
- Silvano Aureoles Conejo (1965), Mexican politician

== See also ==
- Coello (disambiguation), a Galician-language variant
- Conill (disambiguation), a Catalan-language variant
- Coelho, a Portuguese-language variant
