= Altet =

- Locality
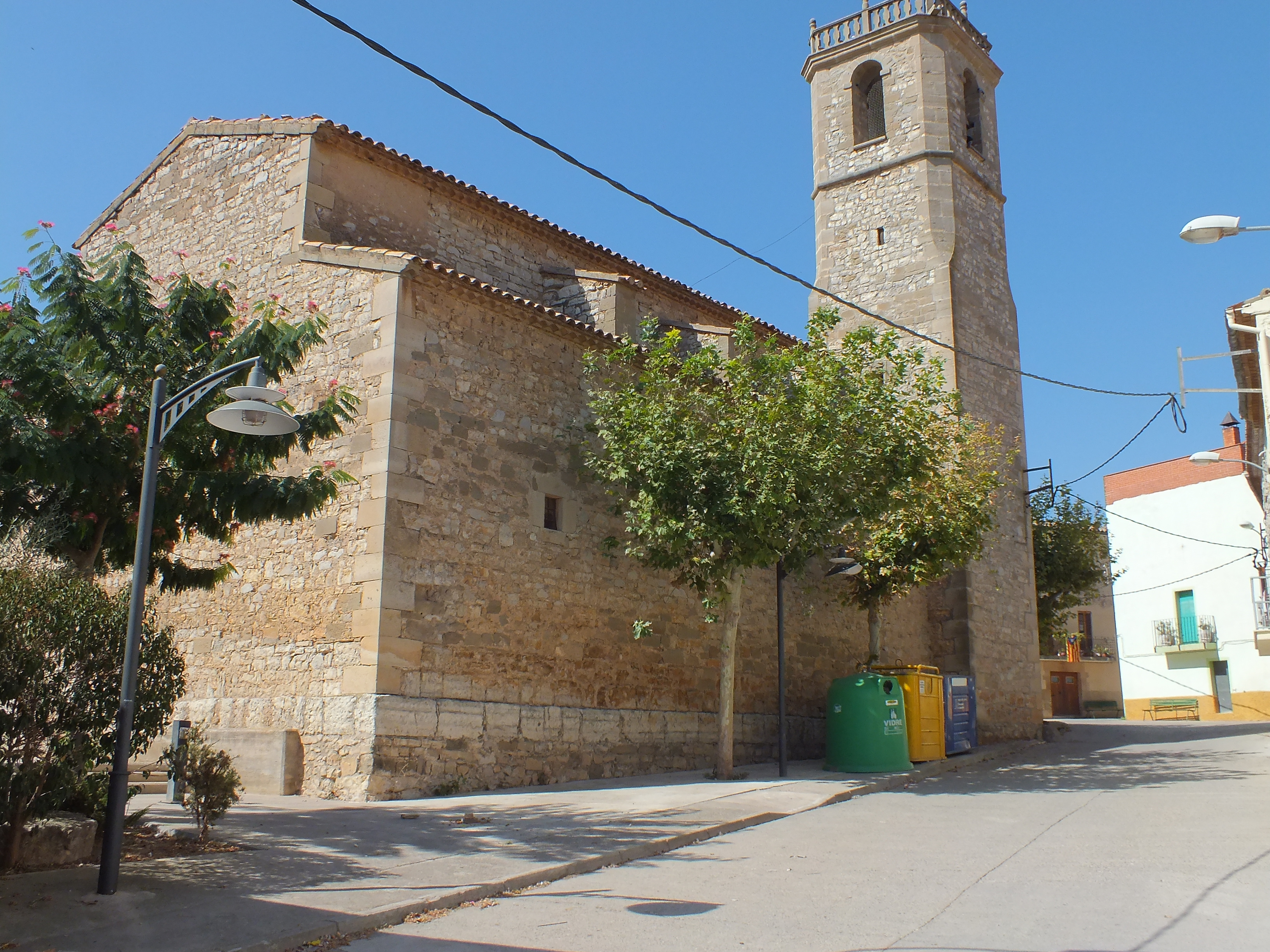

- Location within Province of Lleida Location within Catalonia Location within Spain
- Coordinates: 41°41′1″N 1°8′33″E
- Country: Spain
- Community: Catalonia
- Province: Lleida
- Municipality: Tàrrega
- Elevation: 357 m (1,171 ft)

Population
  - Total: 101

Altet is a locality located in the municipality of Tàrrega, in Province of Lleida province, Catalonia, Spain. As of 2020, it has a population of 101.

== Geography ==
Altet is located 58km east of Lleida.
