= Carlos Pinto Coelho =

Journalist and writer

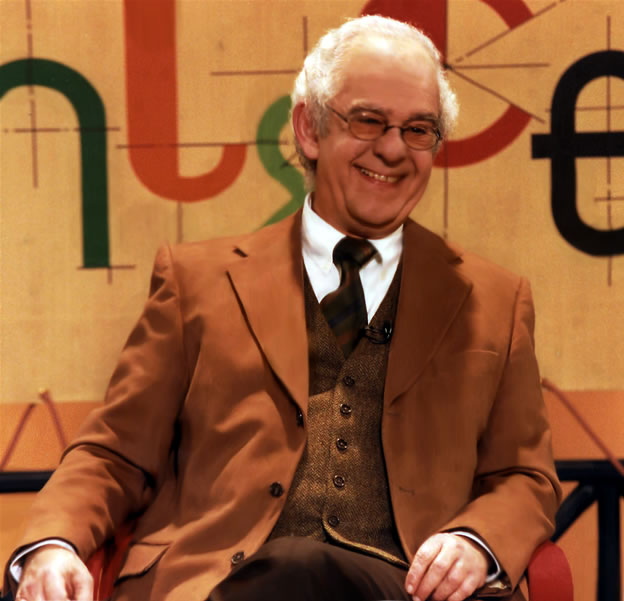
- Carlos Pinto Coelho in his Studio Program (Acontece)
- Born: Carlos Nuno de Abreu Pinto Coelho; 18 April 1944; Lisbon, Portugal
- Died: 15 December 2010 (aged 66); Lisbon, Portugal
- Education: Faculty of Law of the University of Lisbon
- Occupations: Journalism, writing, photography
- Writing career
- Pen name: Carlos Pinto Coelho
- Language: Portuguese
- Period: 1968
- Genres: Fiction, poetry, photography
- Notable work: Acontece
- Notable awards: Order of Infante Dom Henrique(2000) from the President of Portugal Jorge Sampaio Officier des Arts et des Lettres from the Ministry of Culture of France (2010): "Bordalo" Award for Television (Casa de Imprensa – 1995); "Gazeta" Grand Prize Award (Portuguese Press Club – 1997); Career Award/Manuel Pinto de Azevedo Jr. (Oporto newspaper "O Primeiro de Janeiro"- 2002).; Gold Medal Award of the City of Amadora.

Carlos Pinto Coelho (18 April 1944 – 15 December 2010) was a Portuguese journalist, writer, photographer and media personality.

== Life and career ==
Carlos Pinto Coelho was born in Lisbon and lived until he was 19 in Portuguese Mozambique, African Portuguese colony. His mother was the writer, Sara Pinto Coelho and his father was a judge, José Augusto de Vasconcelos Pinto Coelho. In 1963, he returned to Portugal to study law at Faculty of Law of the University of Lisbon.

He made his debut in journalism in January 1968 as a reporter in the Lisbon daily newspaper Diário de Notícias. He was drafted as a second lieutenant of the Portuguese Army and served in the Portuguese Colonial War in the war in Mozambique (1970/1973). After the Carnation Revolution in 1975, he was one of the founders of the daily newspaper Jornal Novo as head of the international news desk. Until 1977, he also worked on the editorial staff of the ANI news agency, on the editorial staff of the weekly news magazine Vida Mundial and was one of the Portuguese correspondents for Radio Deutsche Welle. In 1982, he became executive director of Mais news magazine.

At RTP – Radiotelevisão Portuguesa Portuguese public television, he was deputy head of News (1977), chief editor of the daily news programme Informação/2 (1978), director of Programs (1986/1989) and director of International Relations and African Cooperation (1989/1991). He was the author and host of the award-winning daily cultural newscast "Acontece" (1994–2003). RTP cancelled Acontece in July 2003, despite announcing a return on 11 August, and crossing the 2,000 editions mark in October. The cause was the reformulation of RTP2, initially scheduled for September.

In 2009, he became the president of Telecinco, one of the two companies that unsuccessfully bid for a fifth over-the-air television network in Portugal.

== Radio ==
Editor and host of programmes at radios TSF, Rádio Comercial, RDP/ Antena 1, TDM/Rádio Macau, and from October 1998 until his death, the weekly programme "Agora Acontece" broadcast across 92 local radio stations in continental Portugal, Azores, Madeira, Macau and Spanish Extremadura.

== Teaching ==
Lecturer at the Institute for High Military Studies( 1988–1992). Professor of journalism at ETIC (Lisbon) and at the Politecnical Institute of Tomar (2003–2006).

He was a member of the Opinion Council at RDP- Portuguese public radio, of the Board of the Portuguese Society of Authors and of the National Board of Portuguese Historical Discoveries.

== Other assignments ==
- 1986–1987 – Member of the Board of the European consortium of television stations Europa TV – Hilversum, Holland.
- 1989–1992: Coordinator for the Meeting of Portuguese-speaking Television Stations: Lisbon – São Paulo/ Rio de Janeiro – Sal (Cape Verde). *1990: President-elect of the East-West Committee of the International University of Radio and Television (URTI- Paris).
- 1991: President-elect of the North-South Committee URTI.
- 1977–1992: Representative for RTP on the Committees of Information and Programs of EBU (European Broadcasting Union), URTNA (Union of African National Radios and Televisions), OTI (Organization of Iberian-American Television Stations) and the Prize for Script-writing Prix Genève-Europe.
- He was the Representative of Portugal's Ministry of Culture at the Meeting of the Iberian Television Stations (Mexico, 2005).
- He was a Member of the Jury of the International Film Festivals of Troia (1986), Fantasporto (1987), Cinanima (1996) and at the Portuguese Film Board ICCAM-2006.

He became a Comendador of the Order of Infante Dom Henrique in 2000, Officier of the French "Ordre des Arts et des Lettres", and received the "Bordalo" award for Television (Casa de Imprensa – 1995) and the Grand Prize "Gazeta" (Portuguese Press Club – 1997) and the Career Award/Manuel Pinto de Azevedo Jr. (Oporto's newspaper O Primeiro de Janeiro- 2002). He has the Gold Medal of the City of Amadora.

== Published books ==
- A Meu Ver (Pégaso, 1992)
- Do Tamanho do Mundo (co-autoria – Ataegina, 1998)
- De Tanto Olhar (Campo das Letras, 2002)
- A Meu Ver (2ª edição corrigida e aumentada – ASA, 2006)
- Assim Acontece – 30 Entrevistas Sobre Tudo... E o Resto (Texto Editores, 2007).
- Vozes anoitecidas – Audiobook

=== Photography ===
Since 1981, his photographic works have been public in 49 solo exhibitions and 7 collective exhibitions, in Portugal, Madeira, Spain, Finland, and Mozambique.
