= Óscar Coello =

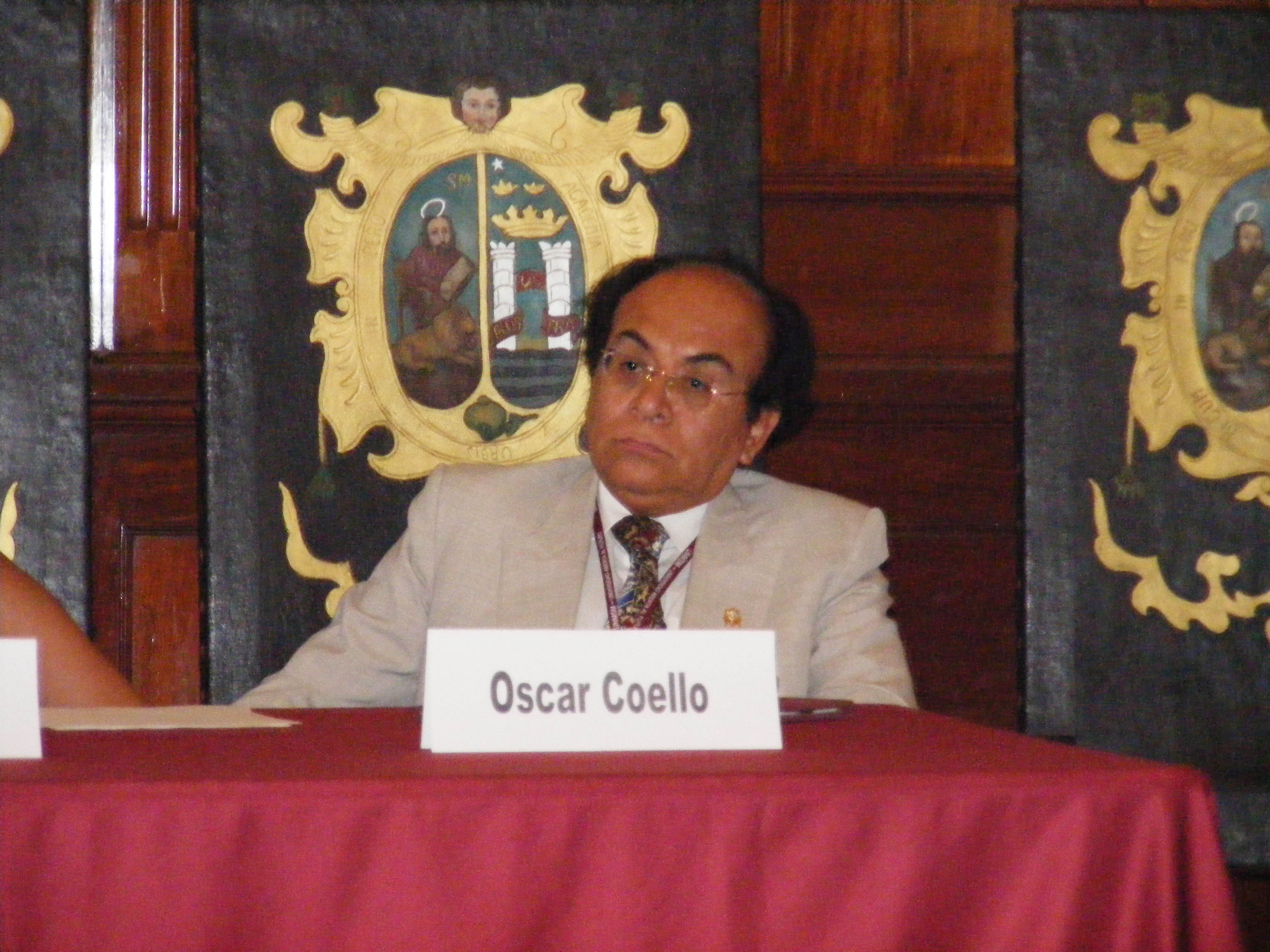
Dr. Oscar Coello in the XVI Symposium on the History of Lima in the Casona de San Marcos in January 2009.

Oscar Coello, (born in Piura, April 15, 1947) is a Peruvian poet, professor and literary critic. He holds the chairs of American literature (sixteenth and seventeenth centuries), and rhythm at the National University of San Marcos in Lima.

== Biography ==
He began his studies at the National University of San Marcos where he was completed his bachelor's in Hispanic literature. He went on to achieve his master's degree in Hispanic literature at the Pontifical Catholic University of Peru and was subsequently awarded his doctorate in Peruvian and Latin American literature from the National University of San Marcos.

== Published works ==
In 1979 Coello wrote his first book of poems entitled Dunes, Oysters and Doorbells (De dunas, ostras y timbres) was published with a foreword by Washington Delgado Tresierra. His second poetry collection, Sky of this World (Cielo de este mundo), was published in 1980 with a foreword by Manuel Pantigoso. In the field of literary studies his works include: Peru in Literature (El Perú en su Literatura), 1983; Beginnings of Spanish Poetry in Peru (Los inicios de la poesía castellana en el Perú), 2001; Origins of the Spanish Novel in Peru: The capture of Cuzco (Los orígenes de la novela castellana en el Perú: La toma del Cuzco 1539), First Edition 2008. Aside from his published books he is also the author of numerous academic texts, among which are: Our Castilian (Nuestro Castellano), 1994; Art and Grammar of Our Castilian (Arte y gramática de nuestro castellano), 1995; and Classical Semiotics Manual (Manual de semiótica clásica), 2007.

=== The Beginnings of Spanish Poetry in Peru ===
In 1999, The Beginnings of Spanish Poetry in Peru was released. This book may be described as one of the most detailed and comprehensive studies of early Spanish language poetry in sixteenth-century Peruvian literature. It outlines chronologically the development of Spanish poetry in Peru. Up until publication of this book, it was widely believed that «The Verses of Isla del Gallo» were the first samples poetry from the time of the founding of Peru. The first book of poetry, entitled The Poem Discovery of Peru was written by Diego de Silva y Guzmán in Cuzco, in 1538. This book comprises 283 verses of ‘Arte Mayor’ and is now considered the first book of poetry in Peru and Spanish America. In his book, Coello also includes studies of the twenty-one real couplets by Francisco de Xerez, which was published in 1534 in Seville; poems of Alonso Enriquez de Guzman, romances and traditional verses from the early days of the founding of Peru.

=== The Origins of the Spanish Novel in Peru: The Capture of Cuzco (1539) ===
Oscar Coello's studies of sixteenth-century Peruvian letters are supported by other books, namely The Origins of the Spanish Novel in Peru: The Capture of Cuzco (1539). Diego de Silva y Guzman was the son of Feliciano de Silva, who was mentioned by Miguel de Cervantes in the first chapter of Don Quixote. Diego de Silva y Guzman wrote in 1539 a text that treats of the time of Manco Inca's revolt and the siege of the Cuzco city; and, also that treats, during the time of the battle between Almagro and Pizarro for the possession of the sacred city of the Incas. This text has all the hallmarks of what we now understand as a novel, and is away from the "Books of Cavalry", because its characters belong to the history of events that took place (as the first Spanish historical novel studied by Menéndez y Pelayo). But, this book approaches the old songs medieval epic which characters sometimes tend to be characters of reality.

=== Other notable works ===
- De dunas, ostras y timbre (1979)
- Cielo de este mundo (1980)
- El Perú en su literatura (1983)
- Nuestro castellano (1994). ISBN 978-9972-9859-3-5
- Arte y gramática de nuestro castellano (1995) ISBN 978-9972-9859-2-8
- Los inicios de la poesía castellana en el Perú (2001) ISBN 9972-42-405-7
- Manual de semiótica clásica (2007) ISBN 978-9972-607-11-0
- Los orígenes de la novela castellana en el Perú: La toma del Cuzco (1539) (1.ª ed. 2008) ISBN 978-9972-2993-2-2
- Diego de Silva y Guzmán. Poema de la conquista del Perú (1538) y la Toma del Cuzco (1539) (2016) ISBN 978-612-4159-42-8
