= Oliverio Coelho =

Argentine writer (born 1977)

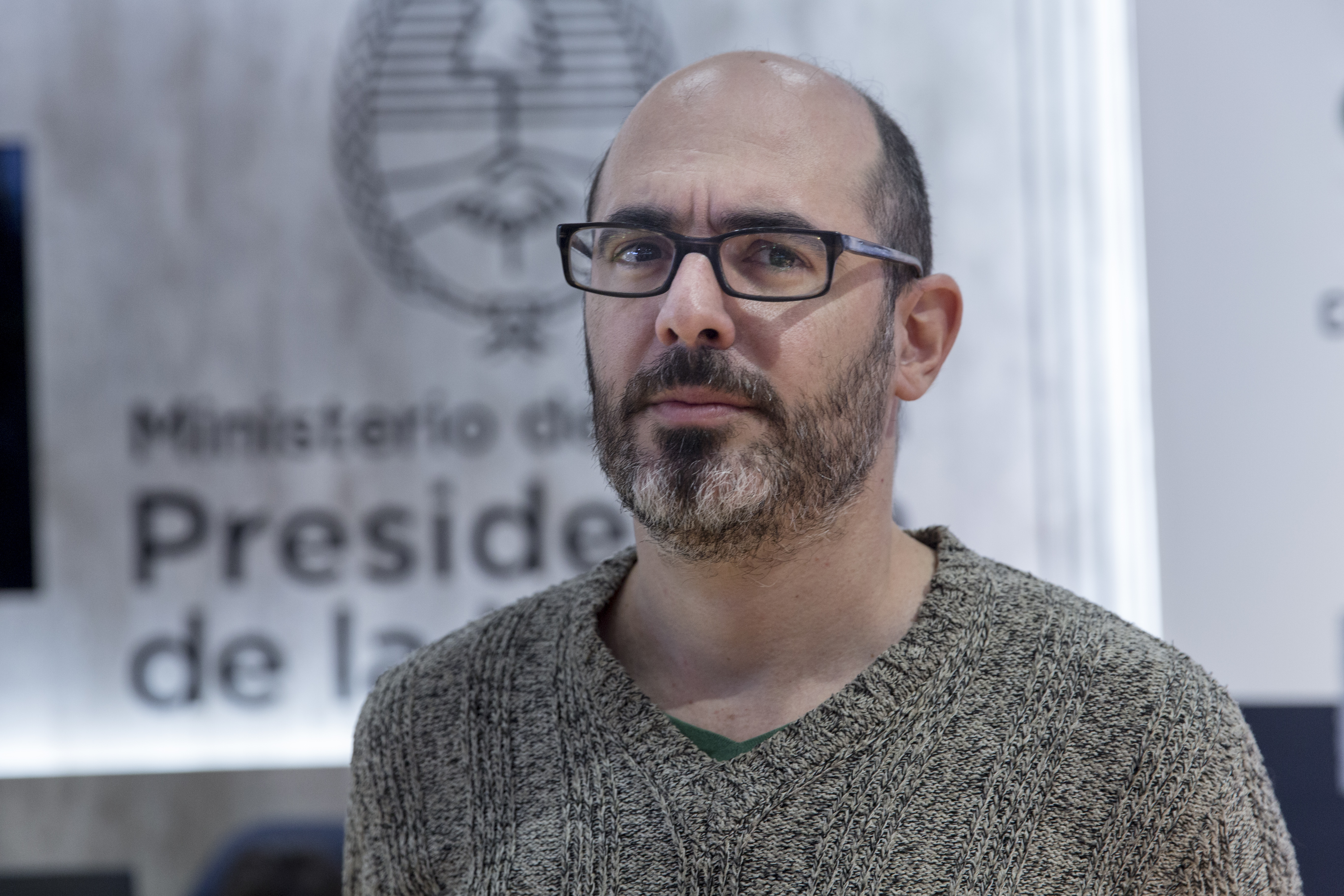
- Born: 1977 (age 48–49) Buenos Aires, Argentina
- Occupation: Writer, critic

Oliverio Coelho (born 1977) is an Argentine writer and critic. He was born in Buenos Aires. He has authored several novels and short story collections, among them:

- Tierra de vigilia (2000),
- Los invertebrables (2003),
- Borneo (2004),
- Promesas naturales (2006),
- Ida (2008)
- Parte domestico (2009),

He has also compiled an anthology of contemporary Korean stories, titled Ji-do (2009). He writes regularly for outlets such as Clarín, El país, La Nación and Inrockuptibles.

Coelho has attended residency programs in Mexico, South Korea, and the United States. He has received awards such as the Latin American Prize Edmundo Valadés in Mexico and the National Initiation Prize in Argentina. In 2011, he was named by Granta magazine as one of the best young writers in the Spanish language.
