= Eliane Coelho =

Brazilian soprano singer

- Born: 1951 (age 74–75); Rio de Janeiro, Brazil
- Genre: opera
- Instruments: soprano
- Formerly of: Frankfurt Opera

Eliane Coelho (born in 1951 in Rio de Janeiro) is a Brazilian soprano singer. She was a soprano in the Frankfurt Opera and performed dozens of roles at the Vienna Staatsoper.

== Biography ==
Coelho began studying architecture at a college in Rio de Janeiro, but she soon decided she would develop her singing career in Europe. She was a pupil of Solange Petit-Renaux, a former star of the Paris Opéra. In 1971, she moved to Germany and studied at the Musikhochschule, in Hanover. In 1974, she was already singing roles like Nannetta, Gretel, Zdenka, Violetta, Liù and Konstanze. In 1976, she concentrated her performances at the Stadttheater, in Bremen, where she stayed for six years and added roles like Fiorilla in Il turco in Italia, Norina in Don Pasquale, Hanna Glawari in The Merry Widow and Lulu in Berg's Lulu. After starting her career as a lyric coloratura soprano, her voice gradually gained heft and a darker color, tending to the lyric and lyric spinto repertoire.

In 1984, she became a regular soprano in the Frankfurt Opera. She also appeared as a guest artist in several opera houses, as in the Teatro Regio di Torino, where she sang in Lulu, and also in Aachen and in the Vienna Volksoper. In 1988, she sang the roles of Giulietta, in The Tales of Hoffmann, at the Festival of Bregenz, and of Donna Elvira at the Theatro Municipal in Rio de Janeiro. In the late 80's, she had already sung in many countries. However, her definitive breakthrough would happen some years later. In 1990, she sang Tosca in Heidelberg and, in 1991, Donna Anna in Rio de Janeiro. In that same year, she was hired by the Vienna Staatsoper, where she debuted with a major success as Salome, which would become her most acclaimed role. From 1991 to 2003, she sang the Straussian role about 140 times.

At that house, she performed dozens of roles, including: Maria in Maria Stuarda, Giulietta in The Tales of Hoffmann, Elettra in Idomeneo, Donna Anna in Don Giovanni, Salomé in Hérodiade, Hélène in Verdi's Jérusalem, Elena in I Vespri Siciliani, Abigaille in Nabucco, Tosca, Madama Butterfly, Liù in Turandot, Lady Macbeth, Lina in Stiffelio, Maddalena in Andrea Chénier and many other roles. She also performed as a guest artist at the Vienna Volksoper as Tatiana in Eugene Onegin and as Abigaille, in 1992; at the Bavarian State Opera and at the Berlin Staatsoper as Salome, in 1995; at La Scala, in Milan, as Madama Butterfly, in 1996; at the Opéra Bastille, in Paris, as Salome, in 1996; and in other important opera houses all around the world, from Manaus, in Brazil, to Tokyo. In 2003 she was Tosca in Luciano Pavarotti's Berlin farewell performance. Also in 2003, she sang her first Turandot in St. Gallen and Berlin and received much applause. In 1998, Eliane Coelho received the title of Kammersängerin in Vienna.

In 2005, Eliane Coelho came back from several months of rest and fight against cancer. She started her career again with a new role: Bellini's Norma. Other recent engagements include a return to Brazil where she sang La Gioconda at the Teatro Amazonas in Manaus, and in São Paulo where she also sang Lady Macbeth from Mzensk for the first time in 2007. Coelho has interpreted operas by Giuseppe Verdi, Richard Strauss (besides Salome, she has sung Arabella and often presents in her concerts Strauss's Four Last Songs) and Verismo composers. In 2008 she sang her first Manon Lescaut in Bucharest and her first Elektra in Budapest. She debuted as Amelia in Verdi's Un ballo in maschera and as Anna Bolena in Donizetti's opera of the same name. She also performed as Amelia in Simon Boccanegra, performed Verdi's Requiem in Bucharest and gave a song recital in Moscow. She has also sung Brünnhilde in both Walküre and Götterdämmerung in Brazil in 2012 and 2013.
