= Sara Pinto Coelho =

Portuguese writer (died 1990)

- Born: 1913; Portuguese São Tomé and Príncipe
- Died: 1990 (aged 76–77); Praia de Miramar, Portugal
- Occupation: Writer
- Spouse: José Augusto de Vasconcelos Pinto Coelho
- Parents: Manuel dos Santos e Abreu Jr (father); Maria Sarah de Lima (mother)

Sarah Augusta de Lima Abreu Pinto Coelho, better known as Sara Pinto Coelho (1913 in Portuguese São Tomé and Príncipe – 1990 in Portugal), was a writer of fiction, plays and children's literature, as well as being a primary school teacher and, later, a radio theatre director.

== Early life ==
Pinto Coelho was born on 30 November 1913 in Roça Esperança, a village on the island of Príncipe in Portuguese São Tomé and Príncipe. She was the daughter of Manuel dos Santos e Abreu Jr. and Maria Sarah de Lima. Her birth in Principe was because her father had, unsuccessfully, gone there to seek his fortune. When she was young, her family returned to Portugal, where she qualified in Porto as a primary school teacher in 1933, graduating with distinction. She then taught for a decade in Porto and Braga, her mother's hometown.

She married José Augusto de Vasconcelos Pinto Coelho, a judge from a noble family. Their son was the journalist, Carlos Pinto Coelho and she had three daughters.

== Later activities ==
Her firm Catholic ideals led her, in the 1940s and 1950s, to work in the slums of the Portuguese Mozambique capital of Lourenço Marques, now Maputo, both as a primary school teacher and with Catholic charities. A strong supporter of the Estado Novo dictatorship in Portugal, she was quoted in a speech of April 1948 as saying that the Estado Novo's leader, António de Oliveira Salazar, found "in the pages of the Gospel, his doctrine of silence, sacrifice, and eternity". She began to move between her work in the slums and the salons of high society, meeting with the governor and the Church hierarchy, writing articles for newspapers, and being invited to meetings with visitors from the Portuguese capital of Lisbon.

However, Pinto Coelho´s knowledge of the conditions faced by the African population gradually began to make her presence in government offices uncomfortable. She was initially advised to moderate her relations with the black community, and then firmly admonished by leaders of the civil service. As a consequence, she withdrew from public life, disillusioned by the Estado Novo, and critical of the Church hierarchy. In May 1967, she accepted an invitation from Rádio Clube de Moçambique to direct its theatre section. This led her to start writing her own plays, producing around 25. She translated and adapted plays by William Shakespeare, Harold Pinter, Somerset Maugham, Chekhov, J. B. Priestley, Nikolai Gogol, Oscar Wilde and others. She also put on works by Portuguese writers such as Bernardo Santareno, Alves Redol, and Luiz Francisco Rebello, which, unknown to the local authorities, had been banned in Portugal. The success of her work led Rádio Clube de Moçambique to ask her to also produce a fortnightly radio programme of short stories.

Pinto Coelho returned to Portugal in 1972, where she continued to write short stories. But the public recognition and appreciation she had received in Mozambique were lacking in Portugal, and her last works, from which Africa was largely absent, reflect disenchantment.

== Death ==
Pinto Coelho died in Praia de Miramar on 3 December 1990. A street is named after her in Fernão Ferro in Seixal Municipality.

== Books ==
- Confidências de Duas Raparigas Modernas (1946)
- O Tesouro Maravilhoso (1947)
- Aventuras de um Carapau Dourado (1948)
- Memórias de uma Menina Velha (1994)
