= La Figuerosa =

- Locality
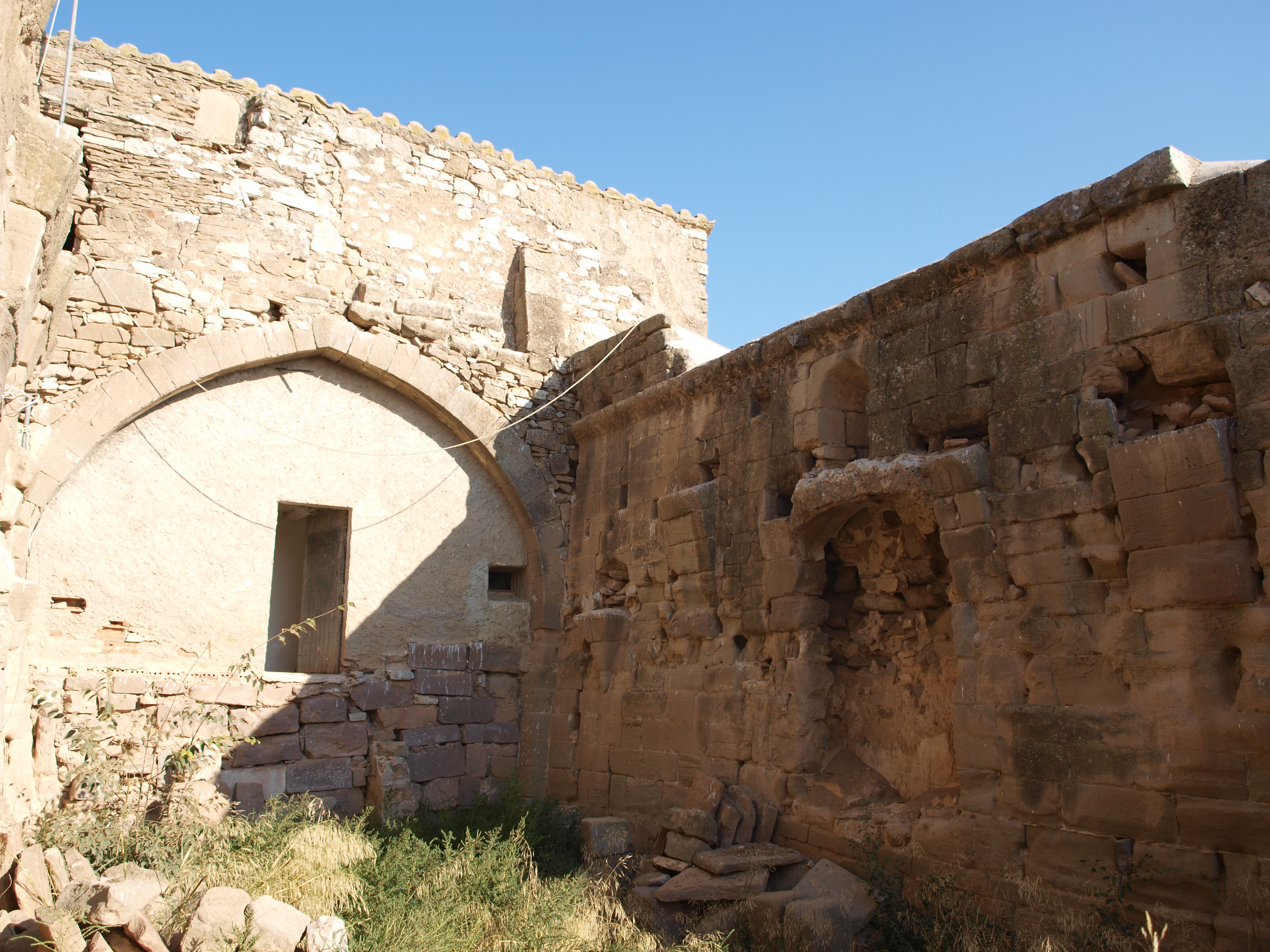

- Location within Province of Lleida Location within Catalonia Location within Spain
- Coordinates: 41°41′49″N 1°10′6″E
- Country: Spain
- Community: Catalonia
- Province: Lleida
- Municipality: Tàrrega
- Elevation: 399 m (1,309 ft)

Population
  - Total: 47

La Figuerosa is a hamlet located in the municipality of Tàrrega, in Province of Lleida province, Catalonia, Spain. As of 2020, it has a population of 47.

== Geography ==
La Figuerosa is located 60km east of Lleida.
