= Rafael Coello Ramos =

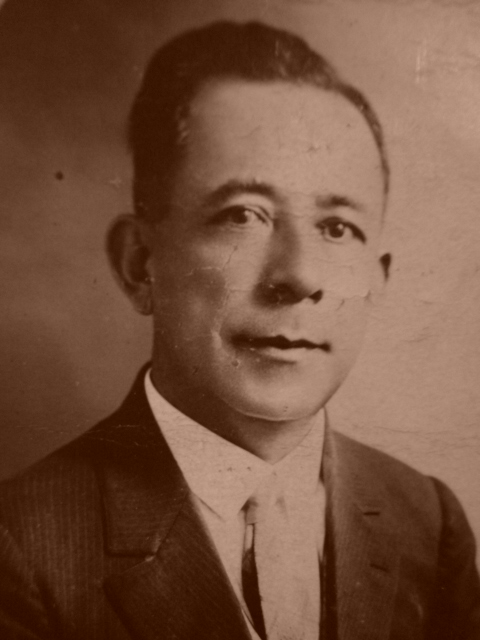

Rafael Coello Ramos (1877 in Comayaguela – 1967 in Tegucigalpa) was the founder of Orquesta Verdi.

- "Al Pino" (Hymn of the Pine)
- "A Gutemberg" (To Gutemberg)
- "Duelo Nacional (To the death of Genaeral Manuel Bonilla)
- "Ave Maria" (Coello's Version)
- "Vexilla Regis" (Coello's Version)
- "Populeus Meus" (Coello's Version)
- "Pater mi" (Coello's Version)
