= Edicions Bromera =

Spanish-Valencian publishing house

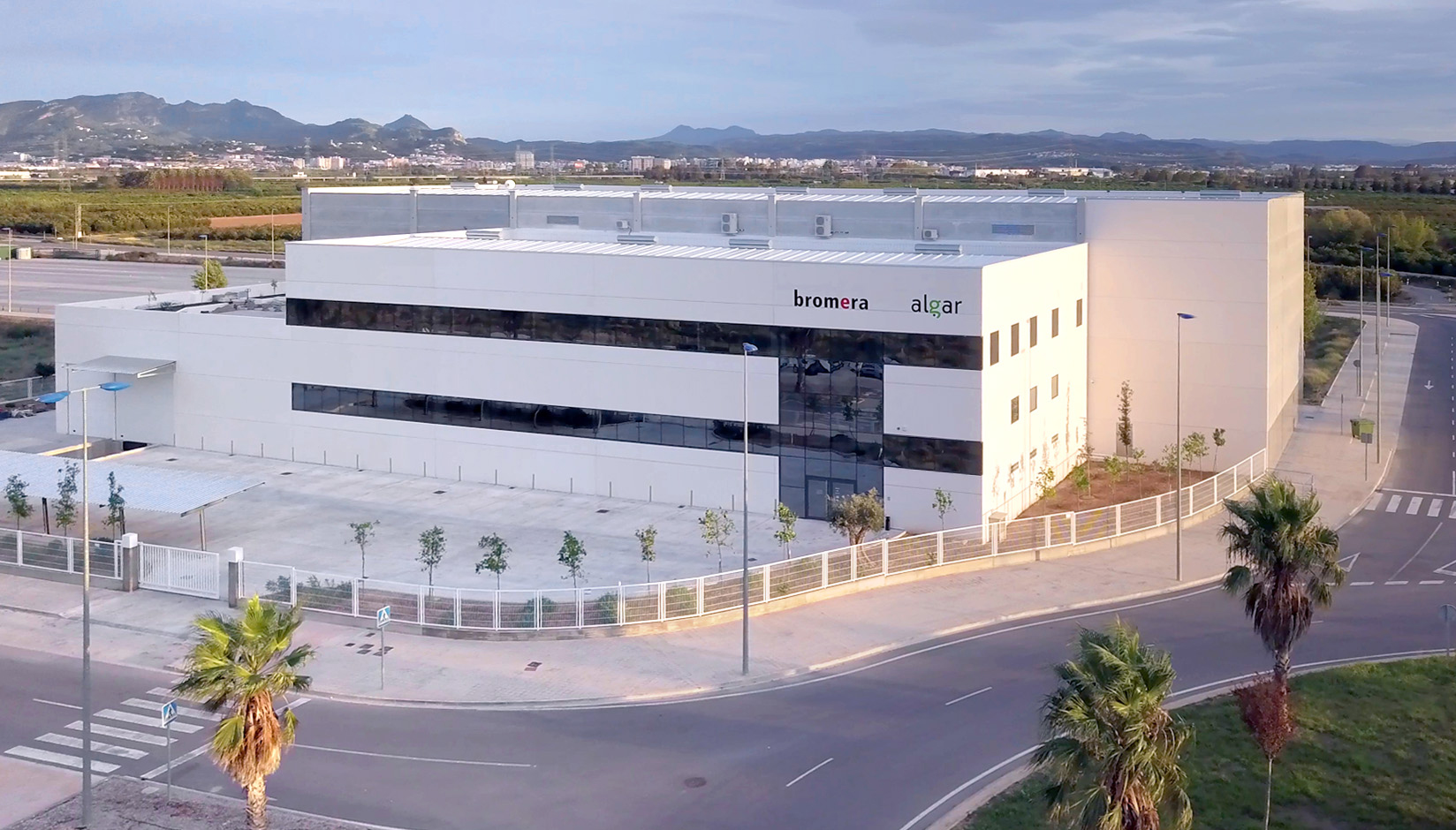
Edicions Bromera

Edicions Bromera is a Valencian publishing house founded in Alzira in 1986. It offers in its catalogue over 3,000 titles distributed in the Catalan language in 30 different collections, a selection of the very best of literature for children, young adults and adults, with broad, open-minded and plural criteria. Grup Bromera is set up by different imprints as Bromera, Algar Editorial, animallibres, Més Llibres or tàndem Edicions.
