= Tàrrega =

- Municipality
- Tàrrega
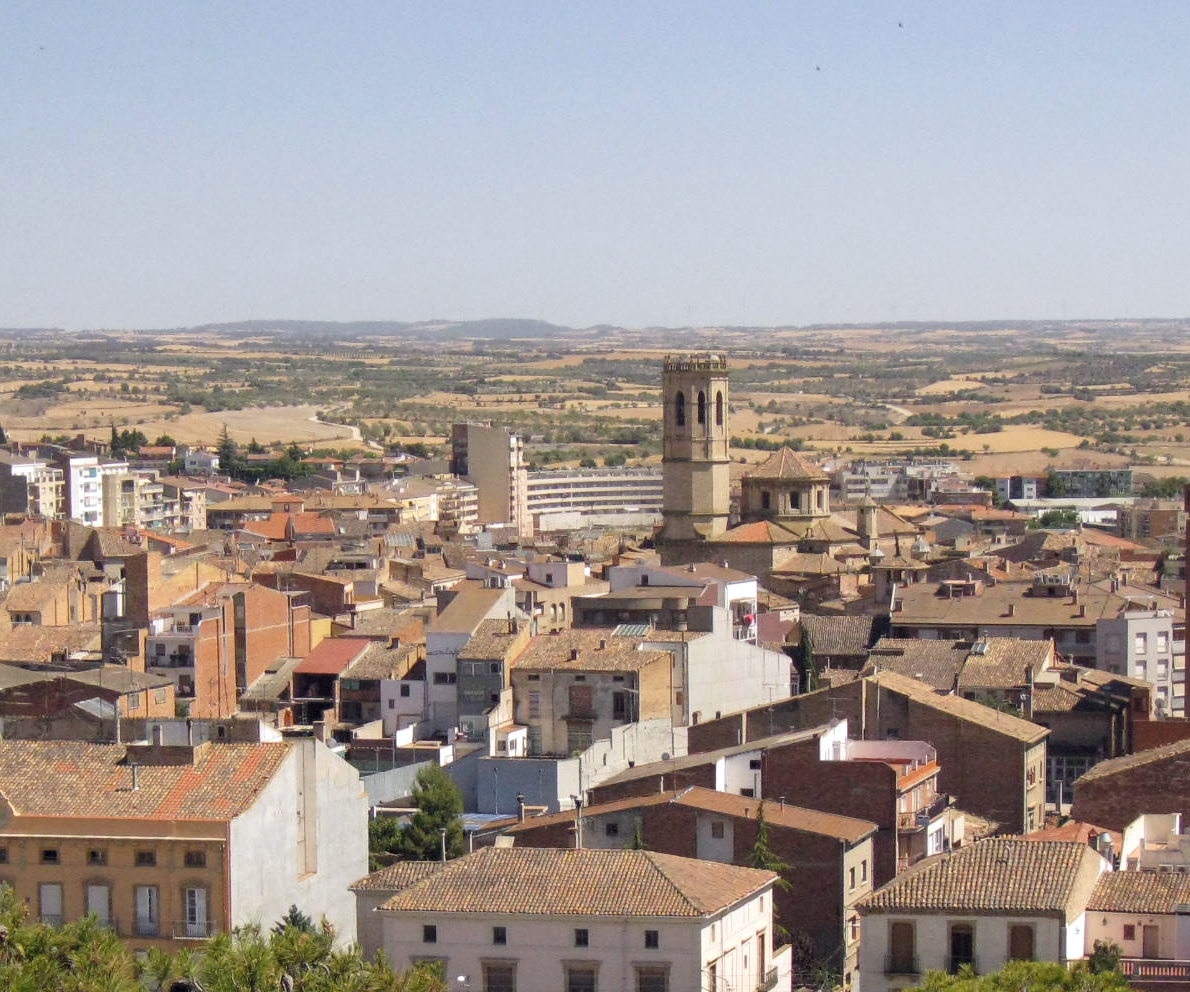
- Tarrega with the tower of the Santa Maria de l'Alba de Tàrrega visible

- Flag Coat of arms

- Location in Catalonia Tàrrega (Catalonia) Tàrrega (Spain)
- Coordinates: 41°38′49″N 1°08′21″E
- Country: Spain
- Autonomous community: Catalonia
- Province: Lleida
- Comarca: Urgell

Government
  - Mayor: Rosa Maria Perelló Escoda (2015) (CiU)

Area
  - Total: 88.4 km^{2} (34.1 sq mi)
- Elevation: 373 m (1,224 ft)

Population (2025-01-01)
  - Total: 19,057
  - Density: 216/km^{2} (558/sq mi)
- Demonym(s): targarí, targarina
- Time zone: UTC+1 (CET)
  - Summer (DST): UTC+2 (CEST)
- Postal code: 25300
- Official language(s): Spanish and Catalan
- Climate: Cfa
- Website: www.tarrega.cat

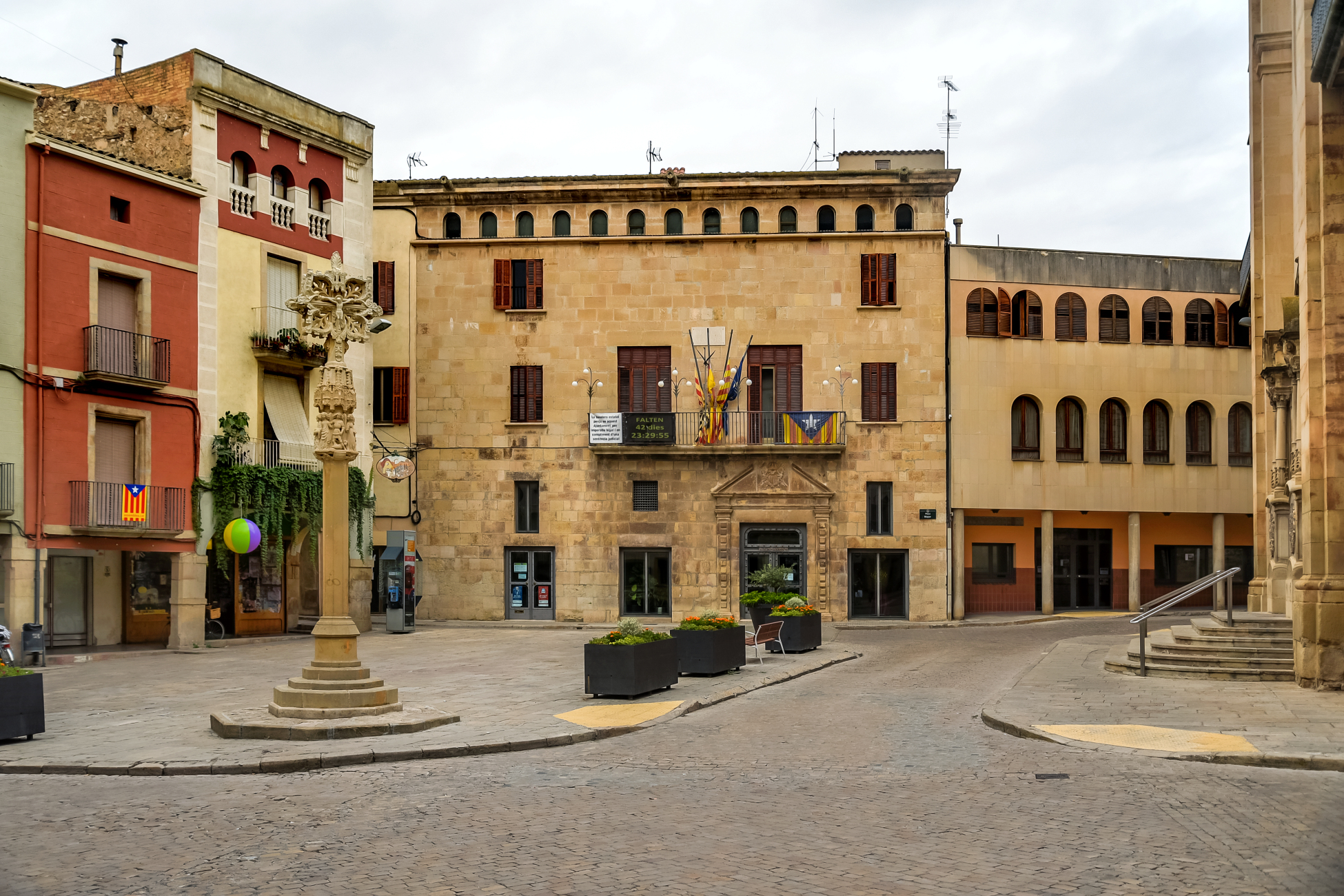
The town hall (Ajuntament)

Tàrrega (Catalan pronunciation: [ˈta.re.ɣa], locally [ˈtaɾ.ɣa, ˈtaɾ.ɣɛ]) is a town and municipality located in the Urgell comarca, Province of Lleida, Catalonia. According to the 2020 census (Statistical Institute of Catalonia), it has a population of 19,057 (register office, 2025).

The village has a Mediterranean climate with certain influences from the Continental climate. Local attractions include a park at Sant Eloi mountain (420 metres (1,380 ft)) with a Romanesque church of the 13th century. Its theatre fair, held annually each September, attracts over 100,000 people a year.

== History ==
Tàrrega's growth began in the 11th century, when Count Ramon Berenguer I conquered its castle. Located at a strategic crossroad, medieval Tàrrega became an important economic and territorial possession. Indications of the town's vitality at the time include its Jewish community, its fairs and markets, and its large amount of artisans (especially goldsmiths). This period of prosperity was ended by the Black Death, which depopulated the town.

On 26 July 1348, the Jews of Tàrrega were victims of one of the earliest episodes of anti-Jewish violence related to the Black Death. Both Christian and Jewish sources attest to the murders. It is estimated that 800 Jews were murdered. (In 2007, excavations in Tàrrega identified the possible location of the medieval Jewish cemetery. Subsequent excavations confirmed that multiple individuals buried in six communal graves had suffered violent deaths.)

Construction of Tàrrega's walls began to monopolize its resources, spurred by the fear of feudal violence. From the 16th to the 19th centuries, Tàrrega began to take on a more rural character, controlled by rich local families. A series of wars in the region caused instability in the city, as well as three revolts of Carlists.

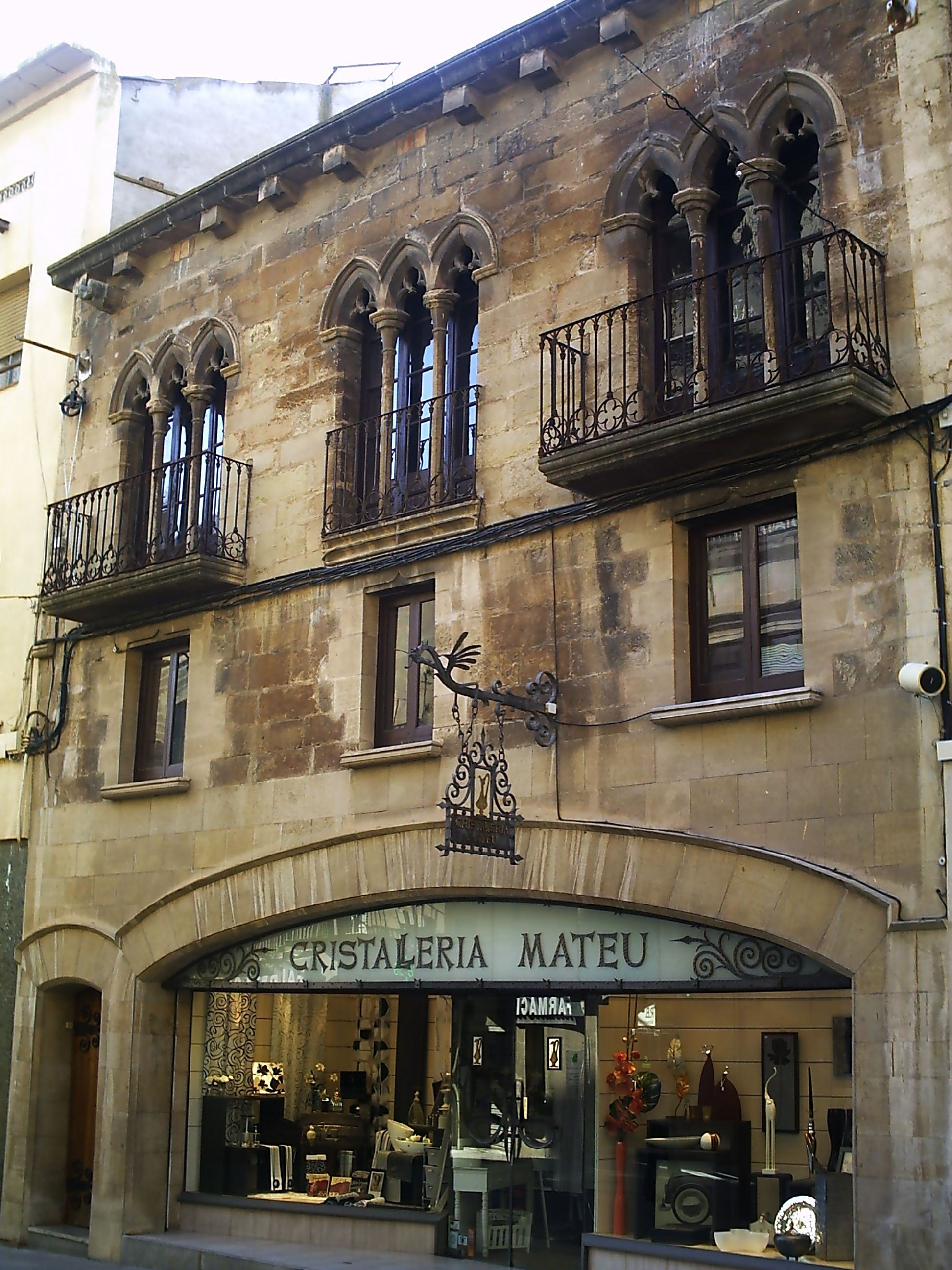
Gothic façade of the Cristalleria Mateu, building that it finds to Carme's street, near the Palace of the Marquises of the Floresta, in Tàrrega.

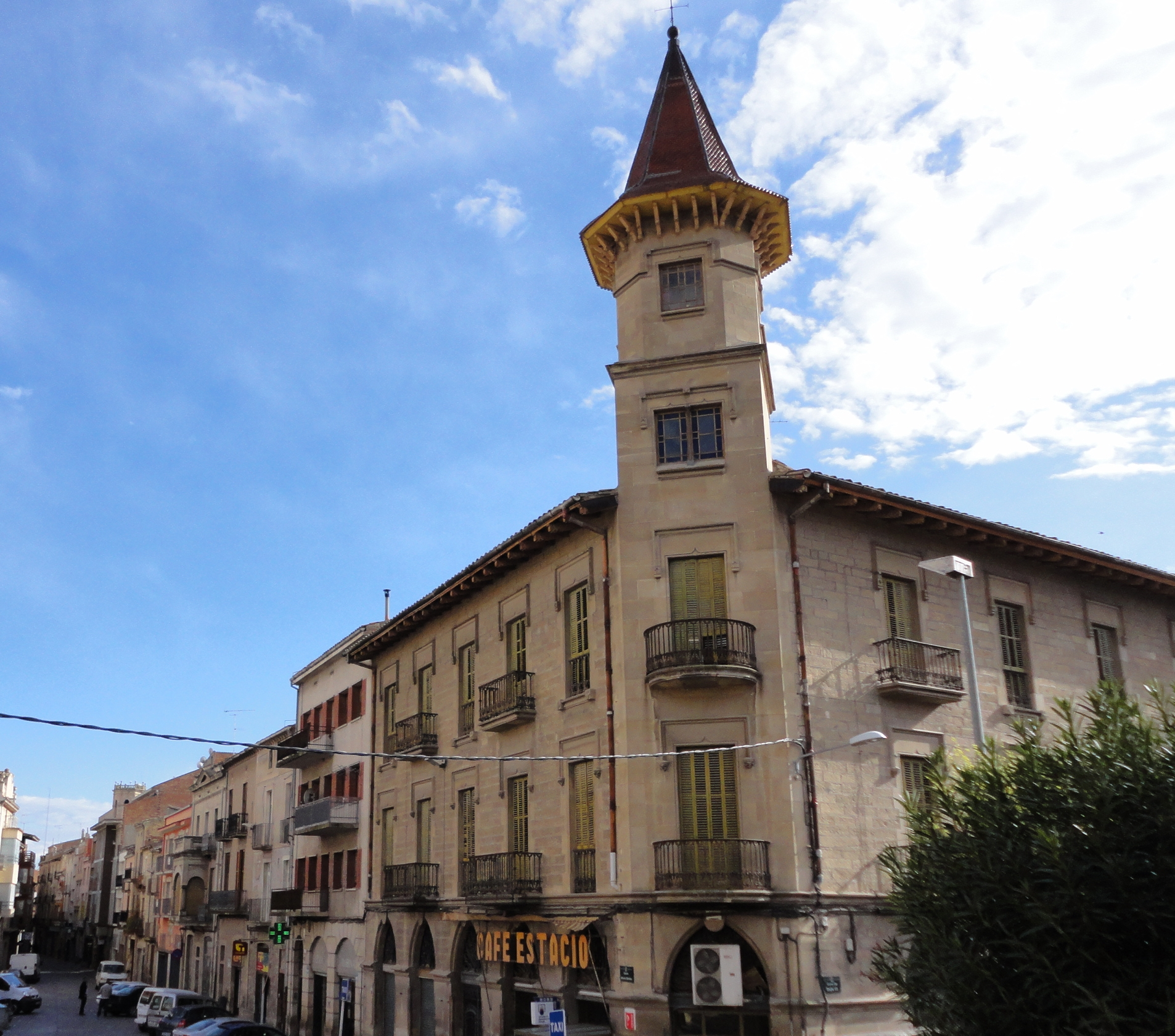
Maimó house.

In the second half of 19th century, Tàrrega underwent a revival. Important events in this time included the inauguration of a railway line connecting the town with Manresa and Lleida in 1860, reconstruction of the walls after a flood in 1874, and the granting of the title of city by King Alfonso XII in 1884. This period also saw the establishment of modern infrastructure in the city.

== Geography ==
The city of Tàrrega is arranged around the square of Carme, better known as "the Courtyard" (Catalan: el Pati). The square features a statue of the classical composer Ramon Carnicer, a famous Tàrrega resident. Adjacent to the square is the Convent of Carme, a Renaissance cloister which dates to the 16th century. Notable buildings in the town square include the town council building, built in 1674, as well as the 19th century modernist chamber of commerce building and the 1910 La Caixa savings bank.

Other local landmarks include the museum on the main street, which still preserves some noble rooms from the 18th and 19th centuries, and the church of Saint Anthony (Catalan: Sant Antoni) in the square of the same name, which dates back to the 14th century. Higher up are the ruins of the castle of Count Ramon Berenguer, constructed in 1056. Little remains of the castle.

The municipality includes the villages of El Talladell, Claravalls, Altet, Santa Maria de Montmagastrell, La Figuerosa, Riudovelles, and Conill (abandoned).

== Economy ==
Tárrega is the home town of Borges Agricultural and Industrial Edible Oils, parent company of the Borges Group, a food company, founded in 1947.

== Notable residents ==
- Mossèn Azà, poet
- Joan Capdevila, footballer
- Ramon Carnicer, Catalan composer
- Alfonso Costafreda, poet
- Francesc Marsà Figueras, painter
- Josep Güell i Guillaumet, musician
- Josep Minguell, painter
- Manuel de Pedrolo, Catalan author
- Anton Tartera, painter
