= Conceição =

Conceição may refer to:

== Places ==
=== Brazil ===
- Conceição River (disambiguation)

Bahia

- Conceição do Almeida
- Conceição do Coité
- Conceição do Jacuípe

Espírito Santo

- Conceição da Barra
- Conceição do Castelo

Maranhão

- Conceição do Lago-Açu

Minas Gerais

- Conceição da Aparecida
- Conceição da Barra de Minas
- Conceição das Alagoas
- Conceição das Pedras
- Conceição de Ipanema
- Conceição do Mato Dentro
- Conceição do Pará
- Conceição do Rio Verde
- Conceição dos Ouros

Pará

- Conceição do Araguaia

Paraíba

- Conceição, Paraíba

Piauí

- Conceição do Canindé

Rio de Janeiro

- Conceição de Macabu

São Paulo

- Conceição (São Paulo Metro), a railway station

Tocantins

- Conceição do Tocantins

=== Portugal ===
- Conceição (Covilhã), a parish in Covilhã
- Conceição e Estoi, a parish in Faro
- Conceição (Horta), a parish in the district of Horta
- Conceição (Ourique), a parish in Ourique
- Conceição (Peniche), a parish in the district of Peniche
- Conceição (Ribeira Grande), a parish in the district of Ribeira Grande
- Conceição de Tavira, a former parish in Tavira
- Conceição e Cabanas de Tavira, a parish in Tavira
- Conceição (Vila Viçosa), a parish in Vila Viçosa

== People ==
- Conceição (given name), a list of people with the given name
- Conceição (surname), a list of people with the surname

== See also ==
- Orfeu da Conceição, stage play with music by Vinicius de Moraes and Antônio Carlos Jobim
