= Conceição (surname) =

Conceição is a Portuguese surname. Notable people with the surname include:

- Abigail Conceição de Souza (1921–2007), Brazilian footballer
- Anderson Conceição (born 1989), Brazilian footballer
- André Maurício Conceição de Souza (born 1976), Brazilian physicist
- Anílton da Conceição (born 1968), Brazilian footballer and coach
- António da Conceição (born 1964), East Timorese politician
- Beatriz da Conceição (1939–2015), Portuguese fado singer
- Buly Da Conceição Triste (born 1991), São Tomé and Príncipe canoeist
- Carlos Conceição (born 1979), Angolan filmmaker
- Cleiton Conceição (born 1978), Brazilian boxer
- Cleusa da Conceição Nazaré de Oliveira (1923–1997), Brazilian physician, better known as Mãe Cleusa Millet
- Deolinda da Conceição (1914–1957), Macanese writer and journalist
- Diego da Conceição de Araújo (1549–1597), Portuguese Roman Catholic prelate
- Ednaldo da Conceição (born 1976), Brazilian footballer known as Naldo
- Eduardo Conceição (born 2009), Brazilian footballer
- Elisa Augusta da Conceição Andrade (born 1855), First Portuguese female doctor
- Felipe Conceição (born 1979), Brazilian footballer and manager
- Filipe de Souza Conceição (born 1995), Brazilian footballer
- Flávio Conceição (born 1974), Brazilian footballer
- Francisco Conceição (born 2002), Portuguese footballer
- Gustavo da Conceição (born 1957), Angolan basketball player
- Hebert Conceição (born 1998), Brazilian boxer
- Ícaro Da Conceição (born 2007), Brazilian footballer
- Ilda Conceição (born 1957), East Timorese politician
- Iranildo Conceição Espíndola (born 1969), Brazilian para table tennis player
- Jacques Conceição (born 1989), Angolan-Portuguese basketball player
- Janina Conceição (born 1972), Brazilian volleyball player
- Jean-Jacques Conceição (born 1964), Angolan retired professional basketball player
- Jhennifer Conceição (born 1997), Brazilian swimmer
- Joaquim Conceição (born 1942), Portuguese footballer
- Jorge Wágner Goés Conceição (born 1978), Brazilian footballer
- José da Conceição (1931–1974), Brazilian athletics competitor
- José Manoel da Conceição (1822–1873), Brazilian pastor
- José Mariano de Conceição Vellozo (1742–1811), Colonial Brazilian botanist
- José Rodrigues da Conceição (born 1919), Portuguese footballer
- Louisa da Conceição (born 1974), Cape Verdean basketball player
- Maria Conceição (born 1977), Portuguese mountaineer and humanitarian
- Maria da Conceição (d. 1798) (1750–1798), natural healer executed for witchcraft
- Maria da Conceição Gayer (1949–2006), Brazilian politician and lawyer
- Maria da Conceição Moita (1937–2021), Portuguese educator and activist
- Maria da Conceição Nobre Cabral, Bissau-Guinean politician
- Maria da Conceição Tavares (1930–2024), Brazilian economist
- Maria da Conceição Zagalo (born 1952), Portuguese business and nonprofit executive and city councillor
- Maria Júlia da Conceição Nazaré (died 1910), Brazilian Mãe-de-santo
- Nei Conceição (born 1946), Brazilian footballer
- Nélson da Conceição (1898–1942), Brazilian footballer
- Paulo Conceição (born 1993), Portuguese high jumper
- Pedro da Conceição (died 1960), Portuguese footballer
- Pedro Rosa da Conceição (died 1919), Brazilian mass murderer
- Ricardo Conceição (born 1984), Brazilian footballer
- Robson Conceição (born 1988), Brazilian boxer
- Rodrigo Conceição (born 2000), Portuguese footballer
- Rogério Conceição (born 1984), Brazilian footballer
- Ronaldo Conceição (born 1987), Brazilian footballer
- Ronivaldo Conceição (born 1972), Brazilian squash player
- Rosângela Conceição (born 1973), Brazilian wrestling, judo and jiu-jitsu practitioner
- Sérgio Conceição (born 1974), Portuguese football manager
- Sérgio Conceição (footballer, born 1996) (born 1996), Portuguese footballer
- Tiago Conceição (born 1989), Portuguese footballer
- Tomas Luiz da Conceição (1703–1744), Roman Catholic prelate
- Toni Conceição (born 1961), Portuguese footballer and manager
- Valdenice Conceição (born 1989), Brazilian canoeist

== See also ==
- Conceição (disambiguation)
- Conceição (given name)
