= Maria da Conceição =

Maria da Conceição can refer to:

- Maria da Conceição (d. 1798), alleged Brazilian witch
- Maria da Conceição, Brazilian high jumper, winner of 1963 South American Championships in Athletics, 1965 South American Championships in Athletics, 1967 South American Championships in Athletics, 1969 South American Championships in Athletics and 1971 South American Championships in Athletics
- Maria da Conceição Gayer (1949–2006), Brazilian politician and lawyer
- Maria da Conceição Gomes de Moura, Brazilian actress in 2011 film Swirl (film)
- Maria da Conceição de Manso Saião (1878–1958), First Lady of Brazil 1919–1922
- Maria da Conceição Mendes Horta (1931–2003), Portuguese mystic
- Maria da Conceição Moita (1937–2021), Portuguese educator and activist
- Maria da Conceição Nobre Cabral, foreign minister of Guinea-Bissau in 2007–2009
- Maria da Conceição Silva (1920–1999), Brazilian marian seer
- Maria da Conceição Moita (1937–2021),
- Maria da Conceição Tavares (1930–2024), Portuguese-Brazilian economist
- Maria da Conceição Zagalo, Portuguese business and nonprofit executive and city councilor

== See also ==
- Conceição Lima (born 1961 as Maria da Conceição de Deus Lima), Santomean poet
- Leonor Maia (born 1921, pseudonym Maria da Conceição de Vasconcelos), Portuguese actress
- Mãe Menininha do Gantois (1894–1986, born Maria da Conceição Assunção), Brazilian spiritual leader
- Maria Ceiça (born 1965 as Maria da Conceição Justino de Paula), Brazilian actress and singer
- Maria O'Neill (1873–1932, born Maria da Conceição de Eça O'Neill), Portuguese writer
- Maria Ramos (born 1959 as Maria da Conceição), Portuguese-South African businesswoman
