= Moita (disambiguation) =

Moita is a municipality in the district of Setúbal, Portugal. It may also refer to the following places:

- Moïta, a commune in the Haute-Corse department, France
- in Portugal:
  - Moita (Anadia), a civil parish in the municipality of Anadia
  - Moita (parish), a civil parish in the municipality of Moita
  - Moita (Sabugal), a civil parish in the municipality of Sabugal
  - Moita (Marinha Grande), a civil parish in the municipality of Marinha Grande
  - Moita do Norte, a civil parish in the municipality of Vila Nova da Barquinha
  - Moita dos Ferreiros, a civil parish in the municipality of Lourinhã
  - Moitas Venda, a civil parish in the municipality of Alcanena
- Moita Bonita, a municipality in the state of Sergipe, Brazil
- Moita (Tanzanian ward), in the Monduli District of the Arusha Region of Tanzania.

== See also ==
- Moita (surname)
