= Moita (surname) =

Moita is a Portuguese surname. People with the surname include:

- Irisalva Moita (1924–2009), Portuguese archaeologist
- Maria da Conceição Moita (1937–2021), Portuguese educator and activist
- Miguel Moita (born 1983), Portuguese football manager
- Rodrigo Moita de Deus (born 1977), Portuguese analyst
