= Conceição (given name) =

Conceição is a Portuguese feminine given name. Notable people with the name include:

- Conceição Andrade (born 1940), Brazilian lawyer and politician
- Conceição Bettencourt, Portuguese neuroscientist
- Conceição Evaristo (born 1946), Brazilian writer
- Conceição Ferreira (born 1962), Portuguese long-distance runner
- Conceição Geremias (born 1956), Brazilian athlete
- Conceição Lima (1961–2026), São Toméan poet
- Conceição Matos (born 1936), Portuguese communist and political prisoner

== See also ==
- Conceição (disambiguation)
- Conceição (surname)
