= Gustavo Gayer =

Brazilian businessman and politician (born 1981)

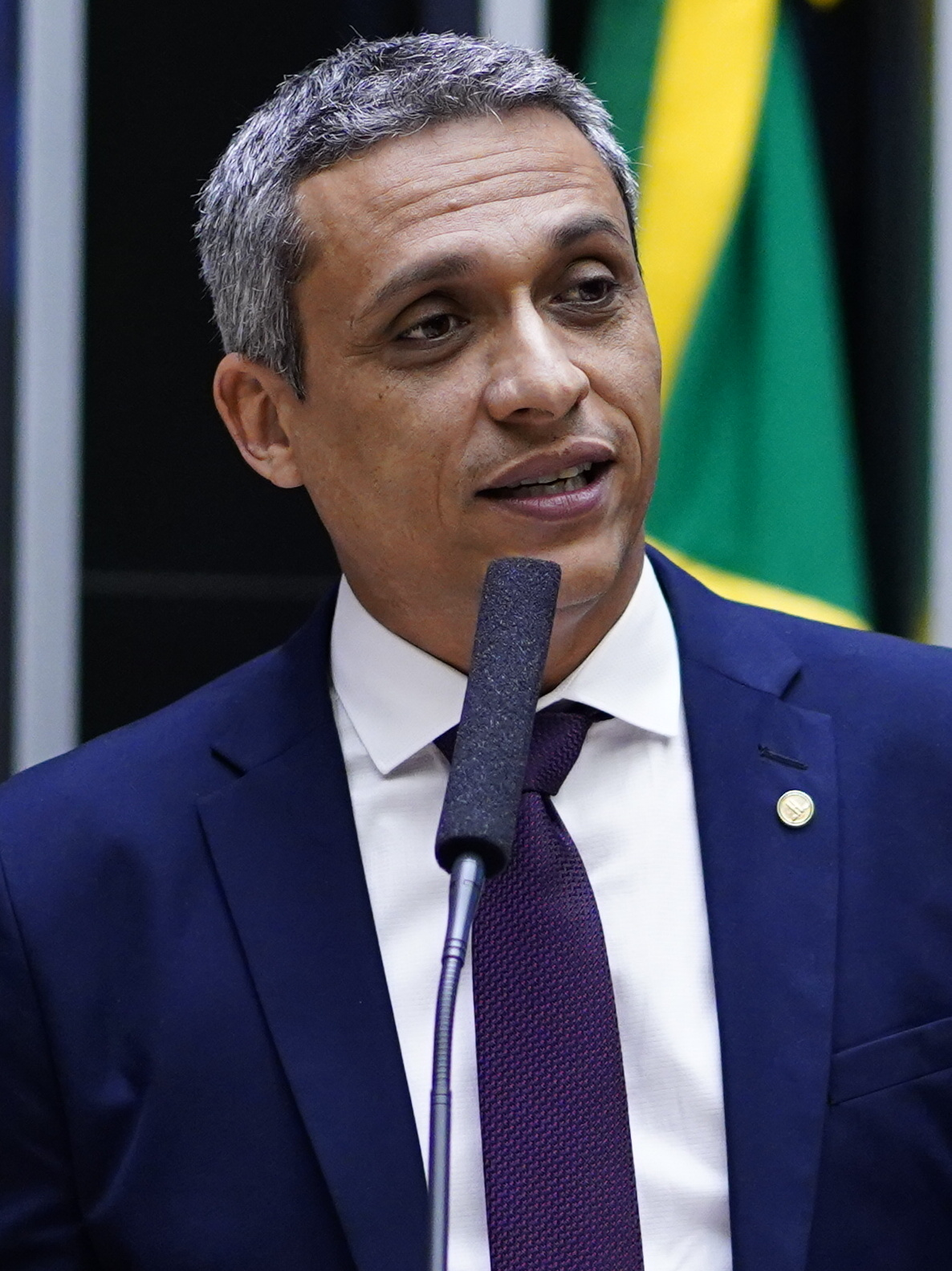
- Gayer in 2023

Senator-elect for Goiás
- Assuming office 1 February 2027

Member of the Chamber of Deputies
- Incumbent
- Assumed office 1 February 2023
- Constituency: Goiás

Personal details
- Born: Gustavo Gayer Machado de Araújo; 13 April 1981 (age 45) Goiânia, Goiás, Brazil
- Party: PL (2022–present)
- Other political affiliations: PSL (2019–2020); DC (2020–2022)
- Profession: Teacher, entrepeneur
- Website: gustavogayer.com.br

Gustavo Gayer Machado de Araújo (born 13 April 1981) is a Brazilian businessman, politician, YouTuber and Internet celebrity. He became better known in 2020 due to the rise of conservatism and the far-right on social media, aligning himself with then-president Jair Bolsonaro. He is considered one of the most controversial politicians in Goiás state and one of the main Bolsonaro supporters in the state. He was named by the COVID-19 CPI as one of the YouTubers who profited most from spreading fake news about COVID-19. In 2022, he was elected federal deputy for Goiás with the second highest vote in the state.

Congressman Gustavo Gayer is facing calls for his impeachment and possible imprisonment due to controversial statements associating the existence of dictatorships on the African continent with the supposed "lack of cognitive capacity" of the population. In a podcast, Gayer compared the IQ in Africa to that of monkeys, claiming that Brazil is following the same path. In addition, he is accused of insulting President Lula by linking Minister Silvio Almeida which was fired after accusations of sexual harassment.

== Biography ==
=== Early years ===
Gayer was born on April 13, 1981, in Goiânia, the capital of the state of Góias. He is the son of delegate, councilor of Goiania and state deputy, Maria da Conceição Gayer, who died in December 2006, who campaigned against the military dictatorship in the early 1980s. His great-grandfather, Plínio Gayer, was a federal deputy for Goiás in the 1950s and was member of Juscelino Kubitschek party, Social Democratic Party (PSD). He is the brother-in-law of Luana Ribeiro, a state deputy from Tocantins, who was a member of the Communist Party of Brazil (PCdoB). In an interview with the Goiás newspaper Diário do Estado in October 2020, she said that her father abandoned her mother when she was still pregnant, and she was raised by an LGBTQ brother who was ten years older.

=== Career ===
He is the owner of a language school with a focus on English, and works as a teacher at the school, despite not having higher education. He is also a digital activist and political commentator.

He became known for his strong engagement with far-right social networks. He has a YouTube channel where he claims to "spread the truth and prevent more young people from falling into the ideological dungeon of the left". As of September 2020, his channel had 290 000 subscribers and videos with 1 million views.

In July 2021 his channel had 419 000 subscribers, having already reached 452 000 subscribers in August of the same year, by which time he was already well identified as a disseminator of fake news. In January 2025, the channel had 1 840 000 subscribers and more than 115 million views. He is a regular commentator on the online political analysis program Hora do Strike, broadcast by the Paraná newspaper Gazeta do Povo.

== Political ==
Gayer says he became interested in politics in 2015, "outraged at the way Brazil was going". He began to take part in the demonstrations for Dilma Rousseff's impeachment, then for Operation Car Wash, and all the demonstrations in support of Bolsonaro.

He entered politics in 2020, building his space in the political field as one of Bolsonaro's biggest supporters. He joined Christian Democracy (DC), to run for mayor of Goiania in 2020. In September 2020, his candidacy was made official by the party to run for mayor. According to Gayer, his motivation for entering politics was dissatisfaction at seeing "opportunists", as he described the then São Paulo senator Major Olímpio and the São Paulo federal deputies Alexandre Frota and Joice Hasselmann, seeking to attract votes from Bolsonaro voters.

On October 21, 2020, his candidacy was rejected by electoral judge Wilson da Silva Dias, due to the absence of first-degree criminal certificates from the State and Federal Courts for the deputy mayor, Alexandre Magalhães, and therefore not being able to register. Despite the ruling, the case was reviewed after an appeal was filed with the electoral court and Gayer was allowed to run for mayor. He finished the election in fourth place, not advancing to the second round, and ahead of deputy Major Araújo, of the Social Liberal Party (PSL), a candidate officially supported by Bolsonaro.

As he became more prominent in the DC's Goiás chapter, he got closer to Bolsonaro, even arranging an official lunch the following year.

Without holding public office, on January 19, 2022, he traveled with public money to the United States together with the federal deputy from São Paulo, Carla Zambelli, and the senator from Ceará, Eduardo Girão, both from Bolsonaro's support base in Congress, in order to participate in the conservative March of Life, with anti-abortion agendas, in Washington, D. C., demanding tougher rules for women who try to have the procedure. The three also attended a dinner at Donald Trump's Trump International Hotel, sponsored by the anti-abortion movement.

He left the DC and joined the Liberal Party (PL). In 2022, he was elected federal deputy for Goiás, receiving more than 200 000 votes and being the second most voted deputy in the election, behind only of Silvye Alves (UNIÃO). In the 2024 mayoral election, Goiânia presented his pre-candidacy. After being passed over by Bolsonaro, who chose Fred Rodrigues to support, and facing a Federal Police (PF) action for embezzling public funds, he decided to leave the campaign. In 2026, he ran for the Senate as a candidate for the PL. After receiving more than 1.5 million votes, she secured the top spot as senator, beating out Gracinha Caiado (UNIÃO), the wife of Governor Ronaldo Caiado (PSD), who was also elected.

=== Electoral historical ===
Year	Election	Office	Party	Votes	Result	Ref.
2020	Goiânia mayoral election	Mayor	DC	45 928	Not elected	
2022	Goiás gubernatorial election	Federal deputy	PL	200 586	Elected	
2026	Goiás gubernatorial election	Senator	PL	1 639 247	Elected	

== Controversies ==
=== Ridicule of nursing ===
At the beginning of May 2020, Gayer went to a nurses' protest on the Esplanade of the Ministries in Brasília, paying a tribute to colleagues who had died after contracting COVID-19. Gayer spread the word on social media that the act was fake, organized by people pretending to be health professionals. At the same demonstration, several nurses were attacked by Bolsonaro supporters. The Nursing Council of the Federal District (Coren-DF) identified three people who harassed the nurses at the demonstration, and filed a complaint with the Federal Public Prosecutor's Office against the aggressors, including Gayer. According to the council's complaint, Gayer's offenses were aimed at diminishing, belittling and ridiculing nursing as an institution and as a profession.

=== Fake news ===
According to the list provided by Google to the COVID-19 CPI and published by the Rio de Janeiro newspaper O Globo in June 2021, Gayer's YouTube channel was the second most profitable with videos spreading fake news about the COVID-19 pandemic, before his videos were deleted for spreading disinformation. Gayer earned almost 8,000 dollars, about 40,000 reais when converting the currency, corresponding to 56 videos disseminating disinformation, second only to journalist Alexandre Garcia's channel.

=== Anti-gender movement ===
In October 2020, in an interview with the newspaper Diário do Estado, Gayer stated that, having been raised by a gay brother, he intended to support homosexuals if elected to the mayoralty. In his government plan, however, Gayer stated that he was against gender ideology.

=== Comprova project ===
In July 2021, the Comprova project, a pool of investigative reports between several broadcasters, investigated and reported on the video after showing an excerpt from a program on TV Sucesso, a TV Record affiliate that broadcast to 30 cities in the southwest of Goiás the partial result of a poll, saying: "if we don't get an auditable vote with a public count, Lula will be put in the presidency, even though 87.5% of the population rejects Lula and approves of Bolsonaro". The video has gone viral, being viewed at least 286,600 times on YouTube and Facebook. The information disseminated is considered manipulated, false and misleading, contributing to the discrediting of the Brazilian electoral system. The poll had no statistical value, having been carried out on WhatsApp without any control of respondents, and the result was not the one transmitted by Gayer. The section showing 87.5% had been obtained in the first few minutes, still with few responses, gradually dropping to 64.9% for Bolsonaro and 33.1% for Lula. In addition, contrary to what Gayer said, referring to a 2019 proposal by federal deputy Bia Kicis, the vote has already been auditable through various mechanisms since at least 2020.

=== Fake news about Barroso ===
In the same month, it misrepresented two statements by Luís Roberto Barroso, the Supreme Federal Court (STF) minister and current president of the Superior Electoral Court (TSE), falsely leading people to believe that the magistrate had already been in favor of the printed ballot, but that he was against it.

=== Fraud in the electronic ballot box ===
In August 2021, he published a video summarizing an interview in which Bolsonaro presents alleged evidence of fraud in the electronic ballot boxes based on a Federal Police investigation, claiming that, in the course of this investigation, the TSE would have admitted tampering with the software of the electronic ballot boxes in 2018, the year Bolsonaro was elected president. The video had been viewed more than 56 000 times on Instagram. The information propagated by Gayer was, however, false, and the TSE has never admitted to any tampering.

=== Video drops ===
On August 16, 2021, the TSE ordered the suspension of reposts to social media channels that spread lies about the elections. 25 channels deleted videos, the largest number of which were deleted on Gayer's channel, a total of 59.

=== Conviction for racist statements and insults ===
In June 2023, Gayer caused controversy by associating dictatorships in African countries with the supposed "lack of cognitive capacity" of the population, declaring that "Brazil is dumbed down" and following the path of African nations. In a podcast, Gayer claimed that the IQ in Africa is 72, comparing it to that of monkeys, and argued that democracy does not thrive in the region due to the alleged cognitive incapacity.

These statements prompted a request for his removal from office for racism at the Chamber's Ethics Council, in addition to two other representations against him. Gayer also faces accusations of insulting President Lula and of racism for associating the African descent of the Minister of Human Rights, Silvio Almeida, with the supposedly inferior intelligence quotient of African peoples.

The Attorney General's Office (PGR) accuses Gayer of spreading racist and segregationist ideas, inferiorizing and dehumanizing blacks and African descendants by comparing them to monkeys. The deputy attorney general claims that the speeches by Gayer and Rodrigo Barbosa Arantes, made on a podcast with around 14 000 views, incited discrimination and racial prejudice.

=== Fights and lawsuits ===
==== Clashes in the Liberal Party's Whatsapp group ====
After the vote on tax reform in 2022, in WhatsApp fights with his party colleague, Vinícius Gurgel (until then a member of the PL in Amapá), his murder trial was resurrected, and he was provoked with a recommendation to join Alcoholics Anonymous (AA.). "Take care of your cases and join AA. Stop driving drunk!" said the deputy from Amapá. Gustavo rebutted with: "There are no lawsuits, dear retard. But your case is quite different, isn't it?" in reference to Gurgel's DNIT cases. "Your murder case hasn't been tried! It's time-barred! Could it be that you were at fault?" replied Gurgel.

==== Discussion with Sylvie Alves ====
In 2022, after the vote on the MP for the Ministries, Gayer accused Sylvie Alves (until then a member of parliament for UNIÃO) of having "sold out" to the Lula government on social media. The MP replied: "For a man who has already killed two people in a drunken accident, he should be sensitive to some causes", and added: "In fact, he left the third paralyzed and never paid any attention", reinforcing the accusations the following day on Instagram. Gayer filed a lawsuit against Sylvie at the STF against the attacks. The Supreme Court dismissed the complaint sent by Gayer.

==== Dismissal of a teacher ====
In 2023, a history and art teacher at a school in Aparecida de Goiânia, in the interior of Goiás, was fired after federal deputy Gustavo Gayer (PL) criticized her on social media for wearing a T-shirt with the expression Seja marginal, seja herói (translated: Be a criminal, be a hero), in reference to the work of artist Hélio Oiticica, whose work is the subject of entrance exam questions. Gayer published the image of the teacher with the caption "History teacher with a petista look in the classroom". The teacher received support from the school community, said that the T-shirt had no political association and declared that the MP had attacked all education professionals. The Goiás State Teachers' Union (Sinpro Goiás) repudiated the congressman's attitude and said it would file a lawsuit against the congressman to delete social networks that spread hate and fake news.

==== Suit for moral damages after exposure of telephone number ====
In August 2024, Gayer and Carla Zambelli were ordered by the São Paulo courts to pay compensation for moral damages to a teacher after sharing her phone number on social media. The episode occurred after the teacher sent Zambelli a private message in which she called her a "fascist". In response, the MP posted the screenshots of the conversation on her social networks, an action that was reinforced by Gayer, who shared the content during an Instagram livestream.

The decision condemning the two politicians was handed down by Judge Camila Franco de Moraes Mariani, of the 21st Civil Court, who set the compensation at 3 000 reais, significantly less than the 117 000 reais initially requested by the teacher. Zambelli even requested compensation for moral damages, claiming that the private message contained disrespectful content. However, the judge rejected the request, arguing that it was the MP herself who made the message public, exposing the conflict and aggravating the situation. The decision can still be appealed, both by the teacher and by the convicted MPs.

== Personal life ==
He was married to Ethiene Araújo Chaves, with whom he had two children. The couple divorced in 2024.

Gayer is the brother of fellow businessman Frederico Gayer Machado de Araújo, who is married to Luana Ribeiro, a state deputy for Tocantins ex-representing and the daughter of Senator João Ribeiro. In March 2014, Frederico Gayer was sentenced to 12 years and six months in prison, to be served in a closed regime, for aggravated homicide in connection with the death of Hebert Resende. The crime occurred in the early hours of April 5, 1997, in front of the Draft nightclub in Goiânia. At the time, Frederico Gayer was serving as a police officer, appointed by the Goiás state government without having passed a public civil service exam.
