= Murilo Rubião =

Brazilian writer

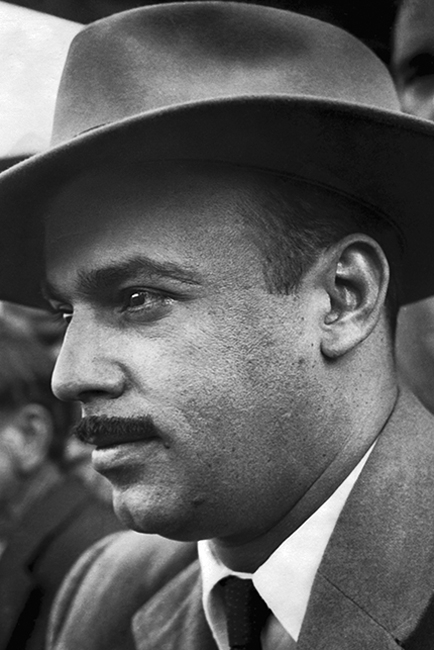
Murilo Rubião, Brazilian writer and journalist

Murilo Rubião (1 June 1916 – 16 September 1991) was a Brazilian writer. His entire work consists of short stories, best described as surreal fables in the tradition of Franz Kafka - this being so, Rubião's work must be seen as part of the Magic Realism movement of late 20th-century Latin America. It is said that Rubião was obsessive about his work, revising it at every new edition, always changing a few details, such as characters' names.

== Biography ==
Rubião was born in Carmo de Minas city, in the state of Minas Gerais, Brazil, to Eugênio Alvares Rubião and Maria Antonieta Ferreira Rubião. He attended school in Conceição do Rio Verde, then studied law in Belo Horizonte, graduating in 1942. In 1947 he released his first collection of short stories, O ex-mágico. The book won little acclaim and Rubião began work as a political advisor. In 1951, he became head of the governor's office of Presidente Kubitschek. Between 1956 and 1961 he served as cultural attaché of Brazil in Spain. In 1966 he founded the Literary Supplement of the Official Gazette of Minas Gerais, which became the most widely distributed literary supplement in Brazil.

The publication of O pirotécnico Zacarias in 1974 brought Rubião sudden literary fame. He is believed to have influenced many Brazilian authors, among them José J. Veiga and Moacyr Scliar. Rubião died in Belo Horizonte on September 16, 1991.

== Adaptations and translations ==
Several of his works have had adaptations for other languages, such as cinema. Among them: "A Armadilha", "O pirotécnico Zacarias", "O ex-mágico da Taberna Minhota" and "O bloqueio". For the theater: "O ex-mago", "The piranha lounge" (play based on the author - several short stories) and"O ex-mago da Taberna Minhota". His main short stories have been translated into English, German, Czech and Spanish.

== Bibliography ==
- O ex-mágico (1947)
- A estrela vermelha (1953)
- Os dragões e outros contos (1965)
- O pirotécnico Zacarias (1974)
- O convidado (1974)
- A casa do girassol vermelho (1978)
- The Ex-Magician and Other Stories [English trans. Thomas Colchie] (1979)
- O homem do boné cinzento e outras histórias (1990)
- Contos reunidos (2005)
