= Alcanena =

- Municipality
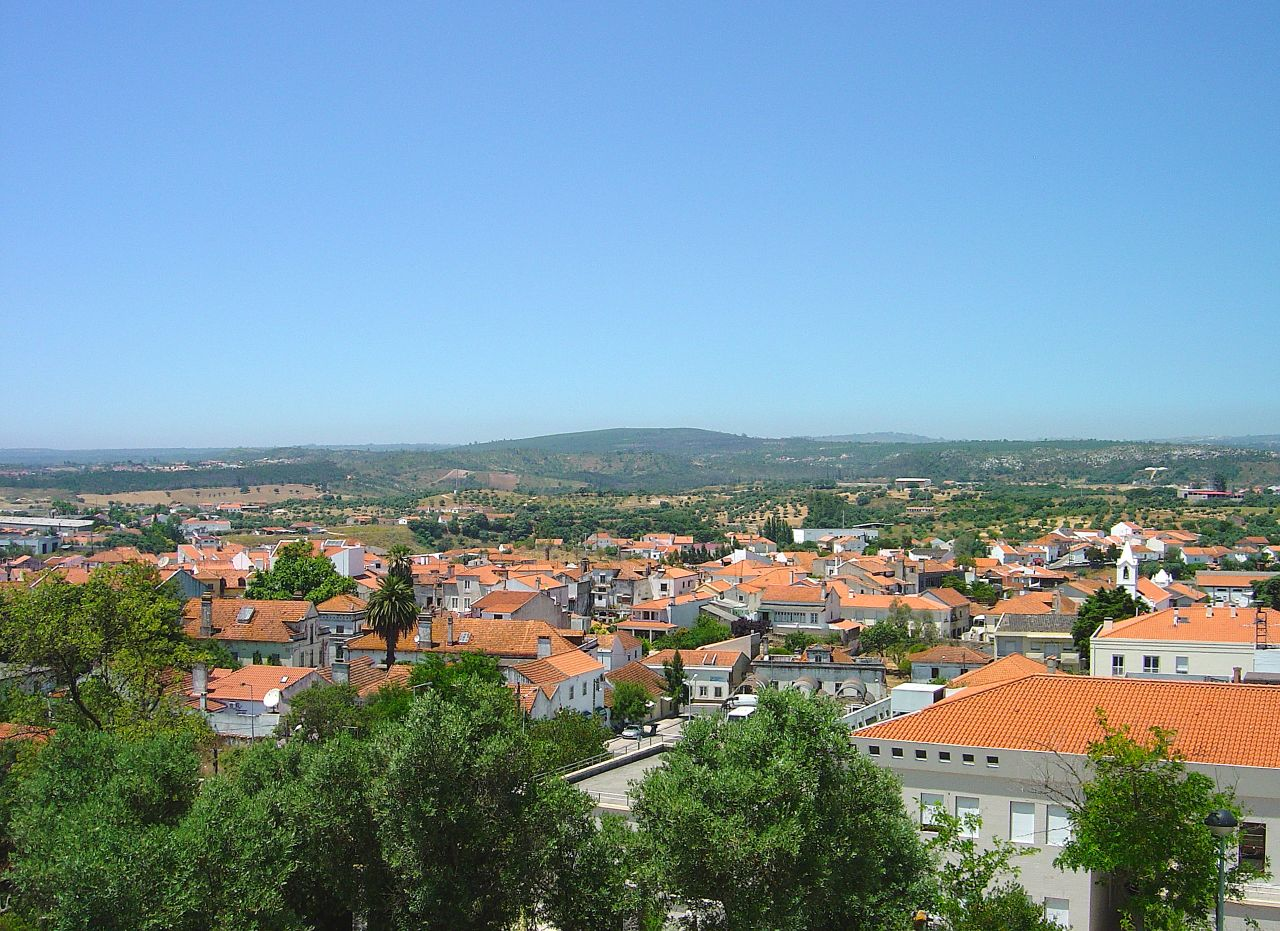
- View of Alcanena

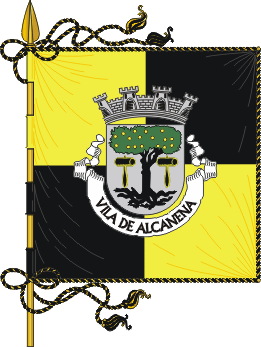
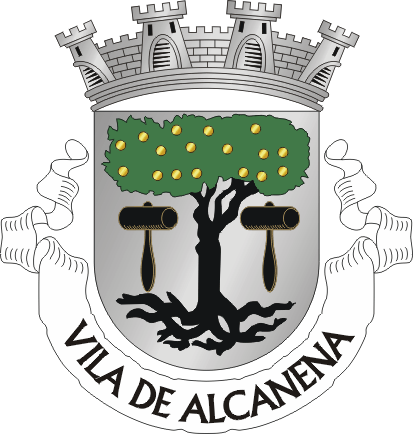
- Flag Coat of arms
- Interactive map of Alcanena
- Location in Portugal
- Coordinates: 39°28′N 8°40′W
- Country: Portugal
- Region: Oeste e Vale do Tejo
- Intermunic. comm.: Médio Tejo
- District: Santarém
- Parishes: 7

Government
  - President: Fernanda Asseiceira (PS)

Area
  - Total: 127.33 km^{2} (49.16 sq mi)

Population (2011)
  - Total: 13,868
  - Density: 108.91/km^{2} (282.09/sq mi)
- Time zone: UTC+00:00 (WET)
  - Summer (DST): UTC+01:00 (WEST)
- Local holiday: Ascension Day (date varies)
- Website: http://www.cm-alcanena.pt

Alcanena (Portuguese pronunciation: [alkɐˈnenɐ]) is a Portuguese town and municipality of Ribatejo in Santarém District. The population in 2011 was 13,868, in an area of 127.33 km².

The current mayor is Rui Anastácio (Partido Social Democrata) and the president of the Municipal Assembly is Silvestre Pereira (Socialist Party). The municipal holiday is Ascension Day.

== Parishes ==
Administratively, the municipality is divided into 7 civil parishes (freguesias):

- Alcanena e Vila Moreira
- Bugalhos
- Malhou, Louriceira e Espinheiro
- Minde
- Moitas Venda
- Monsanto
- Serra de Santo António
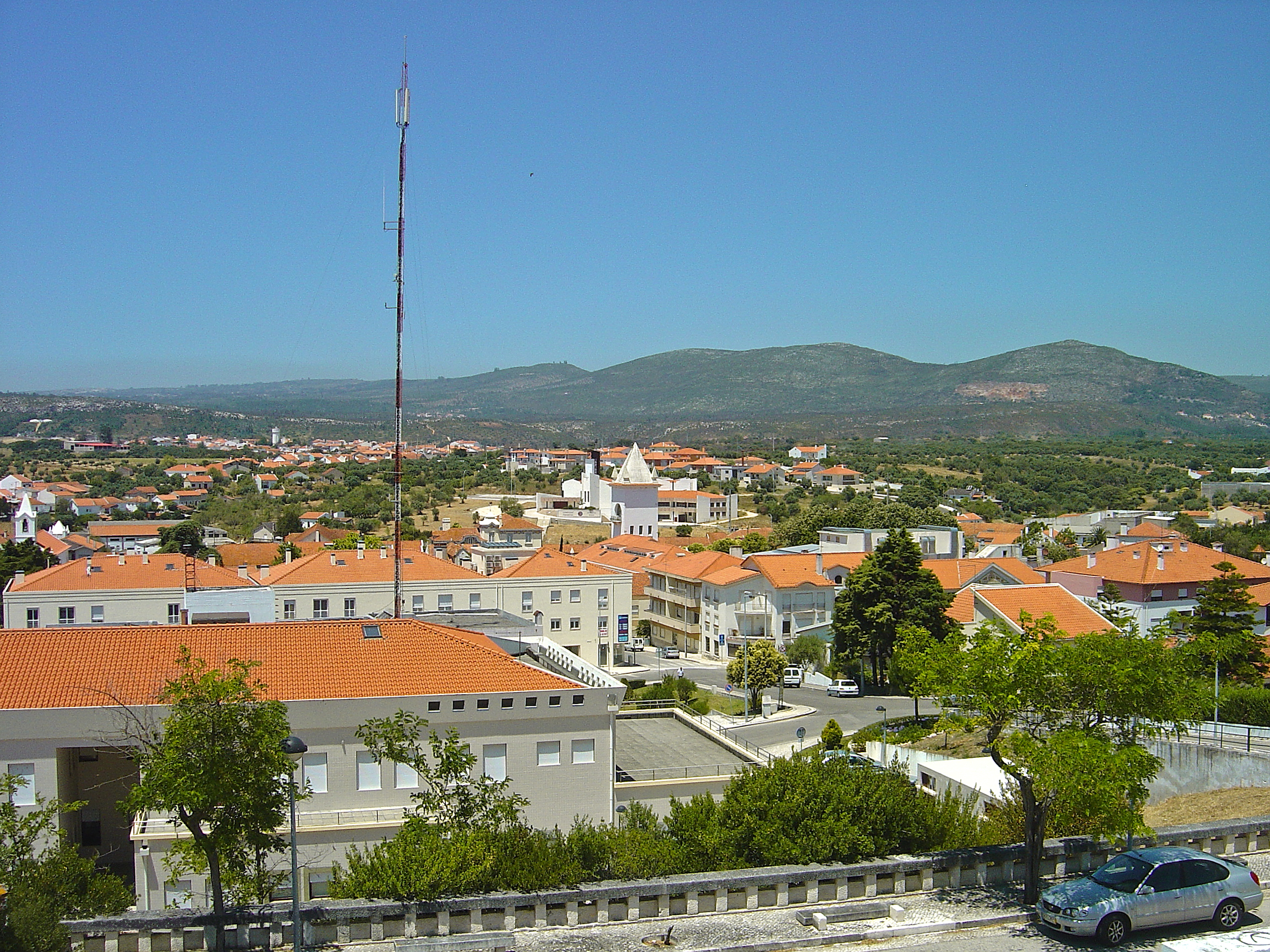
Serras de Aire e Candeeiros Natural Park as seen from Alcanena

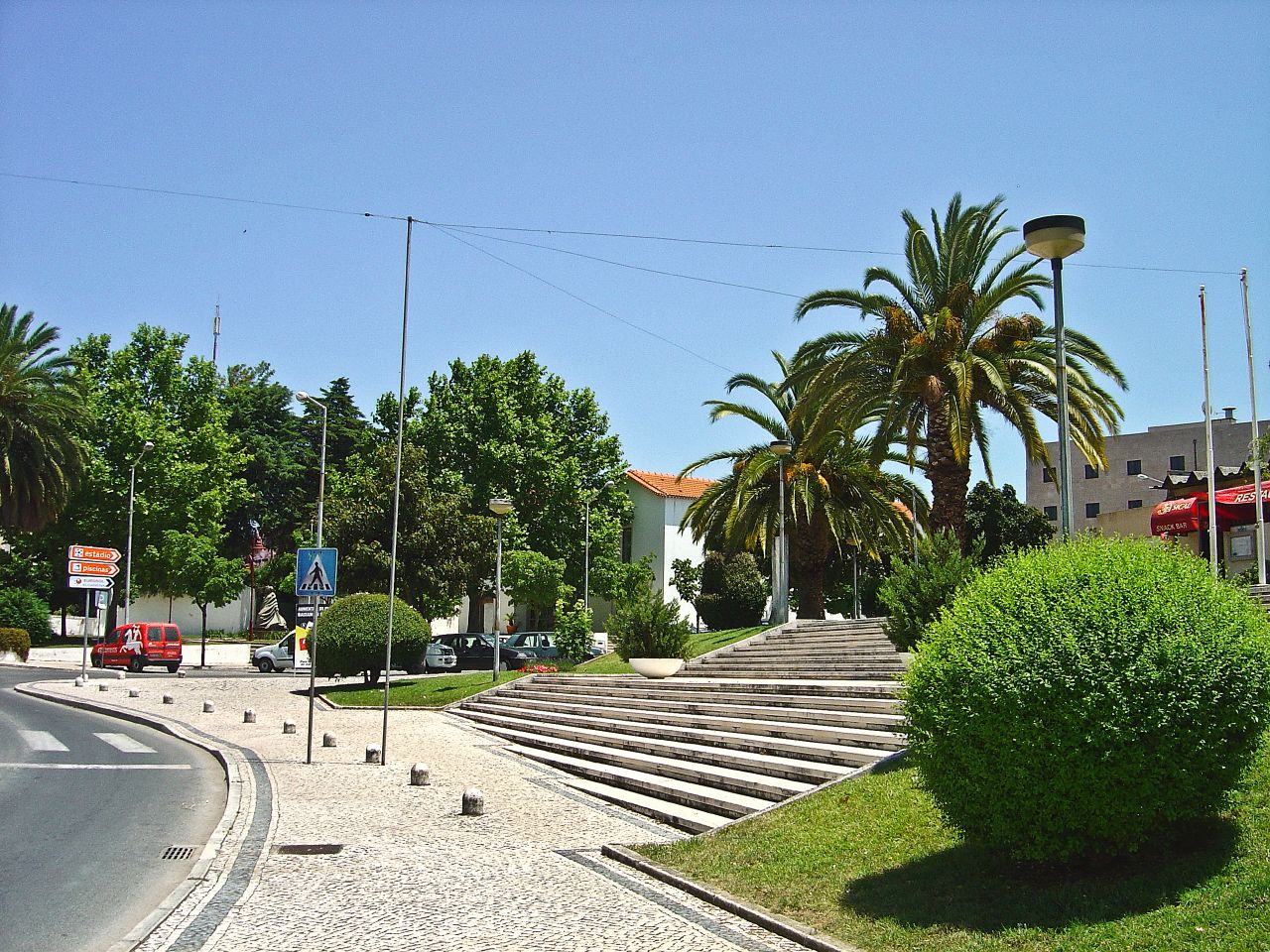

== Notable people ==
- Alfredo Roque Gameiro (1864 in Minde - 1935) a painter, specialized in watercolors
- Maria da Conceição Moita (1937–2021) an educator and political activist
- Carlos Calado (born 1975) a Portuguese long jumper.

== See also ==
- Casais Robustos – village located in Serras de Aire e Candeeiros Natural Park
- Serras de Aire e Candeeiros Natural Park – one of 30 protected areas in the county
