= Seja marginal, seja herói =

1968 artwork by Hélio Oiticica

seja marginal, seja herói
- Artist: Hélio Oiticica
- Year: 1968
- Medium: screen print on fabric

seja marginal, seja herói ('be an outlaw, be a hero') is a 1968 artwork by the Brazilian visual artist Hélio Oiticica.

== Description ==
It is a flag-like fabric screen printed with a representation of Manuel Moreira, popularly known as Cara de Cavalo ('Horse Face')—a well-known bandit gunned down in the favela of Mangueira by the police of Rio de Janeiro in 1964 and a friend of Oiticica's—and the phrase seja marginal, seja herói ('be an outlaw, be a hero') beneath it. The dead body is prostrated, vulnerable, splayed as if it were a crucifix, inverted. The work celebrates the figure of "the marginal" despised by conservative mainstream society.

== History ==
Seja marginal, seja herói was first exhibited February 1968 at the Festival das Bandeiras held at Praça General Osório in Rio de Janeiro.

The axiom seja marginal, seja herói became a rallying cry for dissidents under the military dictatorship in Brazil.

== Reception ==
For Luiz Antonio Garcia Diniz, the image of Cara de Cavalo, shot dead by a Rio de Janeiro police death squad in 1964, recalls the various forms of repression under the military dictatorship in Brazil.

The figure of the antihero or the unknown or anonymous hero is a recurring feature in the work of Hélio Oiticica, who himself sought to live as an artista-marginal, an artist existing on the margins of a society determined to preserve and center, in its mainstream politics and culture, values such as productivity and stability.

== In popular culture ==
A seja marginal, seja herói flag made by Oiticica adorned the stage of the Sucata club in Rio de Janeiro the night of a performance by Caetano Veloso and Gilberto Gil, after which the two were detained end eventually exiled under the accusation of having sung the national anthem of Brazil in parody.

In 2023, a history and art teacher in Brazil was dismissed from her job for wearing a seja marginal, seja herói T-shirt after federal deputy of the Liberal Party Gustavo Gayer criticized her for it on social media, commenting "professora de história com look petista em sala de aula" ('history teacher with a petista look in the classroom').
