= Rodrigo Moita de Deus =

Portuguese analyst

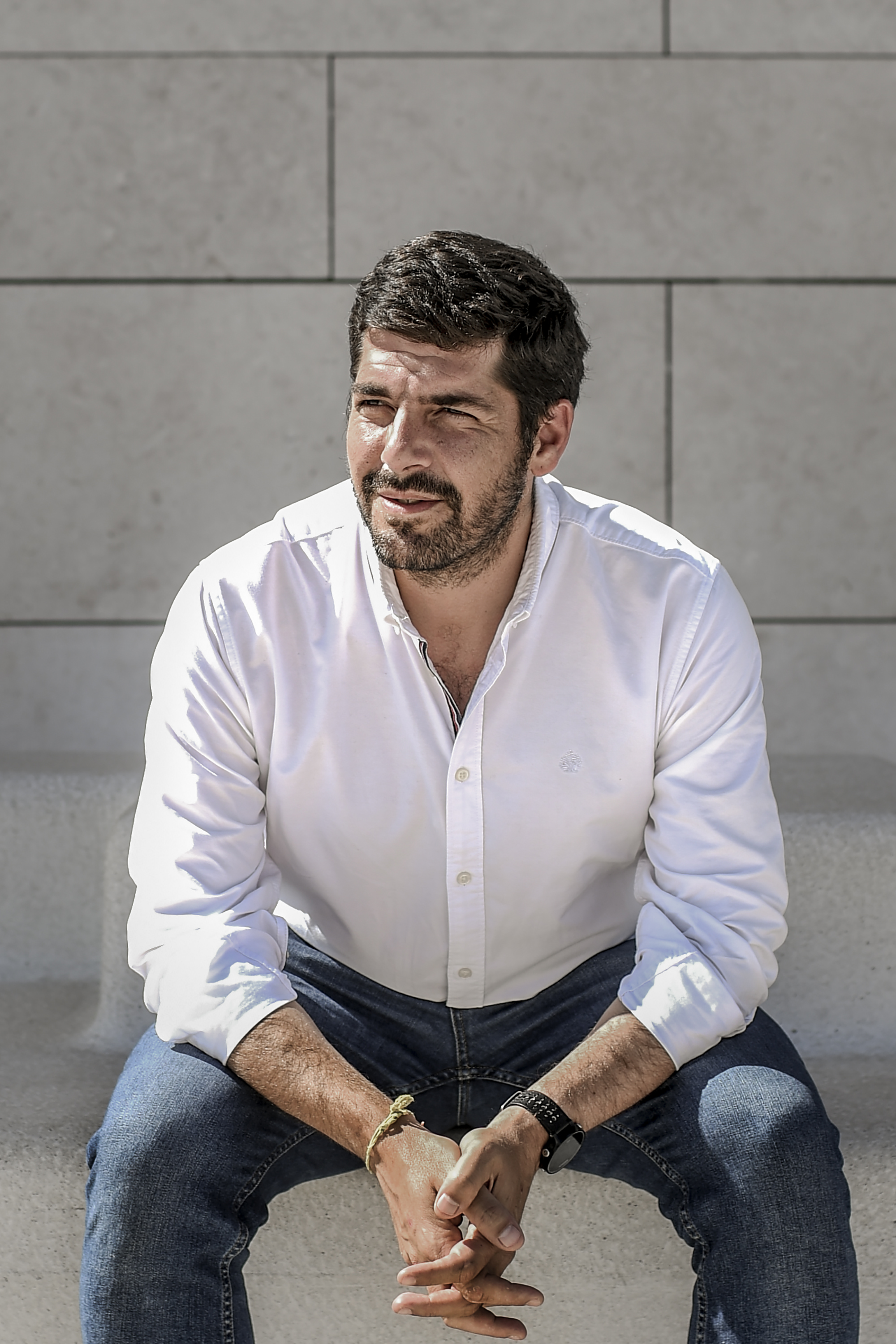
- Rodrigo Moita de Deus in 2020
- Born: 21 November 1977 (age 48); Lisbon, Portugal
- Occupations: Opinion maker; analyst; writer
- Writing career
- Language: Portuguese
- Years active: 2000–present
- Genres: Drama, romance
- Notable work: Será que as mulheres ainda acreditam em príncipes encantados?

Rodrigo Moita de Deus (born 21 November 1977) is a Portuguese analyst, opinion maker and writer.

== Career ==
Moita de Deus was born on 21 November 1977 in Lisbon. He is a writer that started a career as a journalist. He worked in the weekly outlets "Euronotícias" and "O Semanário". Later, he joined the establishment team of the Champalimaud Foundation, an institution dedicated to cancer medical research. In 2006, he was one of the founders of the Portuguese blog "31 da Armada".

In 2009, together with other monarchists and members of the "31 da Armada" blog, he climbed the front balcony of Lisbon City Hall and swapped Lisbon's municipal flag for a national flag from the last period of the portuguese monarchy. This action led to his arrest. After this, in 2011, he created "Vader do Fraque", a fictional character inspired on Darth Vader for the national electoral campaign. "Vader do Fraque" followed the then Prime minister of Portugal, José Sócrates, to all public campaign events, aiming at delivering a 83 billion euros bill – equivalent to the government debt accumulated by Sócrates government.

He made a career in marketing and Public Relations, having founded the public relations agency Nextpower StorySellers in 2008, which he directed until 2019. In 2016, he was one of the creators of the News Museum, a museum located in Sintra, dedicated to news, media, and Communication.

Moita de Deus has been a regular prime time commentator on Portuguese television. He participated in "Noites Marcianas", at SIC; "Combate de Blogs" at TVI; "5 para a Meia Noite", RTP, and on "O Último Apaga a Luz", aired also on RTP. Moita de Deus is a regular speaker about topics related to Communication, he participated in TEDx conferences, Estoril Conferences, at Future European Leaders, and at the Global Forum "Communication on Top" at the Davos Forum, in Switzerland.

Moita de Deus published his first book at the age of 23, "Será que as mulheres ainda acreditam em príncipes encantados?", that became part of the Portuguese National Reading Plan. At the age of 25 he published "O Vigarista: o Homem do Ano", a novel that anticipated, in 2003, the complex connections between business and politics, in the early 2000s. He coauthored several books, namely, "O Acidental" (2005); "Frases para ter em carteira" (2006); in 2015, and "Novo Dicionário da Comunicação".

In 2022 Rodrigo Moita de Deus published "Pax English".

== Works ==
- Será que as mulheres ainda acreditam em príncipes encantados?, Lisboa, Bertrand Editores, 2001
- O Vigarista: o homem do ano, Lisboa, Bertrand Editores, 2002
- O Acidental, Lisboa, Hugin, 2005
- Frases para ter em carteira, editora Livramento, 2006
- Novo Dicionário da Comunicação, Chiado Editora, 2015
- Pax English, Dom Quixote, 2021
