= Conceição das Pedras =

Municipality in Southeast, Brazil

- Municipality
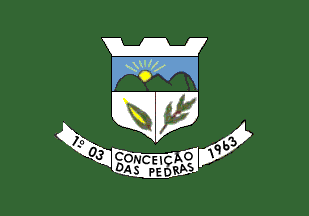
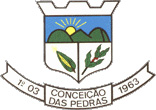
- Flag Coat of arms

- Location in the State of Minas Gerais
- Coordinates: 22°09′36″S 45°27′18″W
- Country: Brazil
- Region: Southeast
- State: Minas Gerais
- Founded: December 30, 1962

Area
  - Total: 101.562 km^{2} (39.213 sq mi)
- Elevation: 1,050 m (3,440 ft)

Population (2020)
  - Total: 2,813
  - Density: 28.3/km^{2} (73/sq mi)
- Time zone: UTC−3 (BST)
- Postal Code: 37527-000

Conceição das Pedras is a municipality in the state of Minas Gerais in the Southeast region of Brazil.

== See also ==
- List of municipalities in Minas Gerais
