= Diego da Conceição de Araújo =

Portuguese Roman Catholic prelate (1549–1597)

Most Reverend Diego da Conceição de Araújo
- Titular Archbishop of Calama; Auxiliary Bishop of Goa
- Church: Catholic Church
- In office: 1595–1597
- Predecessor: Jeronimo Pereyra
- Successor: Jerónimo de Carrerio

Orders
- Consecration: 1596 by Alexeu de Jesu de Meneses

Personal details
- Born: 1549 Vila Viçosa
- Died: 1597 (aged 47–48) Goa

Diego da Conceição de Araújo, O.E.S.A. (1549–1597) was a Roman Catholic prelate who served as an auxiliary bishop in the Archdiocese of Goa (1595–1597).

== Biography ==
João da Rocha was born in Vila Viçosa in 1549 and ordained a priest in the Order of Saint Augustine. On 13 Nov 1595, he was appointed during the papacy of Pope Clement VIII as Titular Archbishop of Calama. In 1596, he was consecrated bishop by Alexeu de Jesu de Meneses, Archbishop of Goa. He served as auxiliary bishop of the archdiocese until his death in 1597.

== External links and additional sources ==
- Cheney, David M. "Archdiocese of Goa e Damão". Catholic-Hierarchy.org. (for Chronology of Bishops) ^{[self-published]}
- Chow, Gabriel. "Metropolitan Archdiocese of Goa and Daman (India)". GCatholic.org. (for Chronology of Bishops) ^{[self-published]}

Catholic Church titles
Preceded by Jeronimo Pereyra	Titular Archbishop of Calama; 1595–1597	Succeeded by Jerónimo de Carrerio
Preceded by	Auxiliary Bishop of Goa; 1595–1597	Succeeded by
