= Conceição Bettencourt =

Portuguese neuroscientist

- Education: University of the Azores
- Scientific career
- Fields: Neurogenetics; Neuroepigenetics
- Workplaces: UCL Queen Square Institute of Neurology
- Website: profiles.ucl.ac.uk/39289-conceicao-bettencourt/

Conceição Bettencourt is a researcher who works in the field of neuro-epigenetics and proposed a role for DNA methylation of oligodendrocytes in early Alzheimer's disease. She studies the involvement of disrupted molecular pathways and DNA methylation in neurodegenerative diseases using human post-mortem brain tissue. The goal is to obtain a deeper understanding of disrupted molecular pathways underlying neurodegenerative diseases, such as frontotemporal dementia, as well as biological aging. She is Professorial Research Fellow of the Alzheimer's Research UK, at UCL, and co-leads the Genetics and Omics Working Group of the international Deep Dementia Phenotyping (DEMON) network. Some of her most recent work integrates Artificial Intelligence for dementia genetics and omics.

== Education and career ==
Bettencourt studied Biology and Human Genetics at the University of the Azores, where she conducted her PhD on "Machado-Joseph disease: from genetic variability to clinical heterogeneity". She then trained as a postdoc in Spain and the Netherlands. She is now a Professorial Research Fellow at UCL Queen Square Institute of Neurology in London, UK.

== Significant publications ==
- Murthy, Megha; Cheng, Yun Yung; Holton, Janice L.; Bettencourt, Conceição (December 2021). "Neurodegenerative movement disorders: An epigenetics perspective and promise for the future". Neuropathology and Applied Neurobiology. 47 (7): 897–909. doi:10.1111/nan.12757. PMC 9291277. PMID 34318515.
- Bettencourt, Conceição; Foti, Sandrine C.; Miki, Yasuo; Botia, Juan; Chatterjee, Aparajita; Warner, Thomas T.; Revesz, Tamas; Lashley, Tammaryn; Balazs, Robert; Viré, Emmanuelle; Holton, Janice L. (January 2020). "White matter DNA methylation profiling reveals deregulation of HIP1, LMAN2, MOBP, and other loci in multiple system atrophy". Acta Neuropathologica. 139 (1): 135–156. doi:10.1007/s00401-019-02074-0. PMC 6942018. PMID 31535203.
- Bettencourt, Conceição; Hensman-Moss, Davina; Flower, Michael; Wiethoff, Sarah; Brice, Alexis; Goizet, Cyril; Stevanin, Giovanni; Koutsis, Georgios; Karadima, Georgia; Panas, Marios; Yescas-Gómez, Petra; García-Velázquez, Lizbeth Esmeralda; Alonso-Vilatela, María Elisa; Lima, Manuela; Raposo, Mafalda; Traynor, Bryan; Sweeney, Mary; Wood, Nicholas; Giunti, Paola; Durr, Alexandra; Holmans, Peter; Houlden, Henry; Tabrizi, Sarah J.; Jones, Lesley (June 2016). "DNA repair pathways underlie a common genetic mechanism modulating onset in polyglutamine diseases: DNA Repair Pathways Modify polyQ Disease Onset". Annals of Neurology. 79 (6): 983–990. doi:10.1002/ana.24656. PMC 4914895. PMID 27044000.
- Bettencourt, Conceição; Forabosco, Paola; Wiethoff, Sarah; Heidari, Moones; Johnstone, Daniel M.; Botía, Juan A.; Collingwood, Joanna F.; Hardy, John; Milward, Elizabeth A.; Ryten, Mina; Houlden, Henry (March 2016). "Gene co-expression networks shed light into diseases of brain iron accumulation". Neurobiology of Disease. 87: 59–68. doi:10.1016/j.nbd.2015.12.004. PMC 4731015. PMID 26707700.
- Bettencourt, Conceição; Ryten, Mina; Forabosco, Paola; Schorge, Stephanie; Hersheson, Joshua; Hardy, John; Houlden, Henry (1 July 2014). "Insights From Cerebellar Transcriptomic Analysis Into the Pathogenesis of Ataxia". JAMA Neurology. 71 (7): 831–839. doi:10.1001/jamaneurol.2014.756. PMC 4469030. PMID 24862029.
