= Elisa Augusta da Conceição Andrade =

First Portuguese female doctor (born 1855)

- Born: 1855; Lisbon, Portugal
- Died: Unknown
- Known for: First Portuguese woman doctor

Elisa Augusta da Conceição Andrade (1855–?) was a Portuguese medical doctor, being the first woman to practice this profession in Portugal, from 1889.

== Career ==
Andrade was born in Lisbon, probably in 1855. She enrolled to study medicine at the Escola Politécnica of Lisbon (later the Faculty of Sciences of the University of Lisbon) in 1880, at the age of 25. In 1889 she opened her own practice in Lisbon, in the square now known as Largo Trindade Coelho, specialising in the treatment of women and children.

On September 1, 1889, the Diário de Notícias newspaper announced that:

D. Elisa Augusta da Conceição Andrade, who completed her course at the Medical School of Lisbon this year, opened an office for women and children. This is finally the first big step towards the emancipation of women in Portugal! In a little while, maybe a year from now, two new doctors, trained by the Porto school, will join that one, and their example will be followed and others will follow ……

It appears that she was not well received by her fellow male students, one of whom, writing in 1925, 35 years after the course ended, recalled her as being "short, thin and ugly" and alleged that she washed infrequently. He noted that she was poor, relying on class notes rather than buying textbooks. He also alleged that the patients in the Hospital de São José, a Lisbon hospital specialising in surgery where the students trained, were reluctant to be observed by her.

== Controversy ==
Although Andrade was registered at the college from 1880 and the story in the Diário de Notícias in 1889 would appear to confirm that she did practice medicine, there is controversy as to whether she actually qualified as a doctor. Researchers have been unable to find evidence that she submitted her final dissertation or any indication that she graduated in 1889, the last record being found referring to her passing exams in 1886. Possibly the inability to pay the required fee was the reason for her failure to graduate although the student quoted above also indicated that she had an income from giving music lessons.

== Honours and awards ==
- There is a street named the Rua Dra. Elisa Augusta de Andrade in Tavira in the Algarve region of Portugal.
