= Maria Conceição =

Portuguese mountaineer and humanitarian (born 1977)

- Born: May 23, 1977 (age 49)
- Citizenship: Portugal
- Occupations: Athlete, humanitarian
- Website: www.mariadaconceicao.com

Maria Conceição (born May 23, 1977) is a Portuguese humanitarian, mountaineer, endurance athlete and motivational speaker. She is the founder of the Maria Cristina Foundation, which provides education and social support to children from slum communities in Dhaka, Bangladesh. Conceição is the first Portuguese woman to climb Mount Everest (2013) and K2 (2024), and the first Portuguese person to complete the Explorer’s Grand Slam.

== Early life ==
Conceição grew up in Portugal in a disadvantaged background, losing her mother at a young age. She later worked as a flight attendant for the airline Emirates, where in 2005 she visited Dhaka and was moved by the poverty she witnessed. This led her to establish the Maria Cristina Foundation.

== Mountaineering and exploration ==
- 2010 – Summited Mount Kilimanjaro.
- 2011 – Completed the “Last Degree” trek to the North Pole.
- 2013 – First Portuguese woman to summit Mount Everest.
- 2018 – First Portuguese woman to reach the South Pole and climbed Mount Vinson.
- 2022 – Summited Denali (North America).
- 28 July 2024 – First Portuguese woman to summit K2.
- 2024 – Summited Carstensz Pyramid and completed the Explorer’s Grand Slam.
- May 2025 – First Portuguese woman to summit Lhotse.

== Guinness World Records ==
Among her many athletic achievements Conceição has officially set 10 Guinness World Records.

1. Fastest time to complete an ultramarathon on each continent (female) – 2014
2. Fastest aggregate time to run an ultramarathon on each continent (female) – 2014
3. Most consecutive days running an ultramarathon by a female (7 days) – 2014
4. Fastest aggregate time to run a marathon and ultramarathon on each continent (female) – 2015
5. Fastest time to complete a marathon on each of the seven continents (female) – 2015
6. Fastest time to run a marathon and ultramarathon on each continent (female) – 2015
7. Fastest time to complete an Ironman triathlon on six continents (female) – 2017
8. Most Ironman races completed in one year (female) – 2017
9. Fastest time to complete an Ironman 140.6 triathlon and Ironman 70.3 triathlon (female) – 2022
10. Farthest simulated distance climbed on a ladder machine in one hour (female), 1.59 km – 2023

== Speaking and publications ==
Conceição is a motivational speaker at international conferences, including events by Harvard Alumni, Mindvalley, and John C. Maxwell.

=== Selected speaking engagements ===
- 2011 – TEDxDubai
- 2018 – Harvard Business School Alumni Summit
- 2018 – Guest on Spencer Lodge Podcast
- 2020 – TEDxUOWD
- 2023 – Mindvalley Dubai
- 2024 – Mindvalley Estonia; Misk Global Forum
- 2025 – Cigna Global Summit (February); Thrive Abu Dhabi (April); Xchange Netherlands (June); Vcon Malaysia (June, 10,000 audience); Luncheon Ladies; GlobalWIIN, London (October)

=== Publications ===
- A Woman on Top of the World. Maria Conceição. 2022. ISBN 978-1035038237.
- Butterfly Stories (Volumes 1 & 2). Maria Conceição. 2023. ISBN 978-1035038244.
- Altered Path. Maria Conceição. 2023. ISBN 978-1035038251.
- The World Needs Superheroes. Maria Conceição. 2024. ISBN 978-9948349020.

== Awards and recognition ==
- 2007 – Most Exceptional and Innovative European Woman of the Year
- 2009 – Emirates Humanitarian Woman of the Year
- 2010 – Alhan Hot 100 Entrepreneur in UAE; Most Inspiring Women of the GCC by Kraft
- 2012 – Special Mention for Child Welfare by Petrochem; Most Inspiring Women of the GCC by Kraft
- 2013 – Sustainability Leadership Award
- 2014 – Inspiring Change Award (International Gulf Organization); Runner-up Humanitarian Woman of the Year (Inspiring Women Belgium); Louvor Nobre Casa da Cidadania
- 2015 – Cidadão Nobre Portugal; Cosmopolitan Female Role Model
- 2016 – GQ Portugal Woman of the Year
- 2017 – Barbie Inspiring Women Role Model Award (Portugal)
- 2018 – Women of Substance Award (Dubai Women Run)
- 2021 – Mulher Inspiradora (Running Category), Revista Activa
- 2025 – Daughters of the Desert Award (Sports Excellence and Humanitarian Impact); GlobalWIIN Special Recognition Award, London
