= Silvye Alves =

Brazilian politician (born 1980)

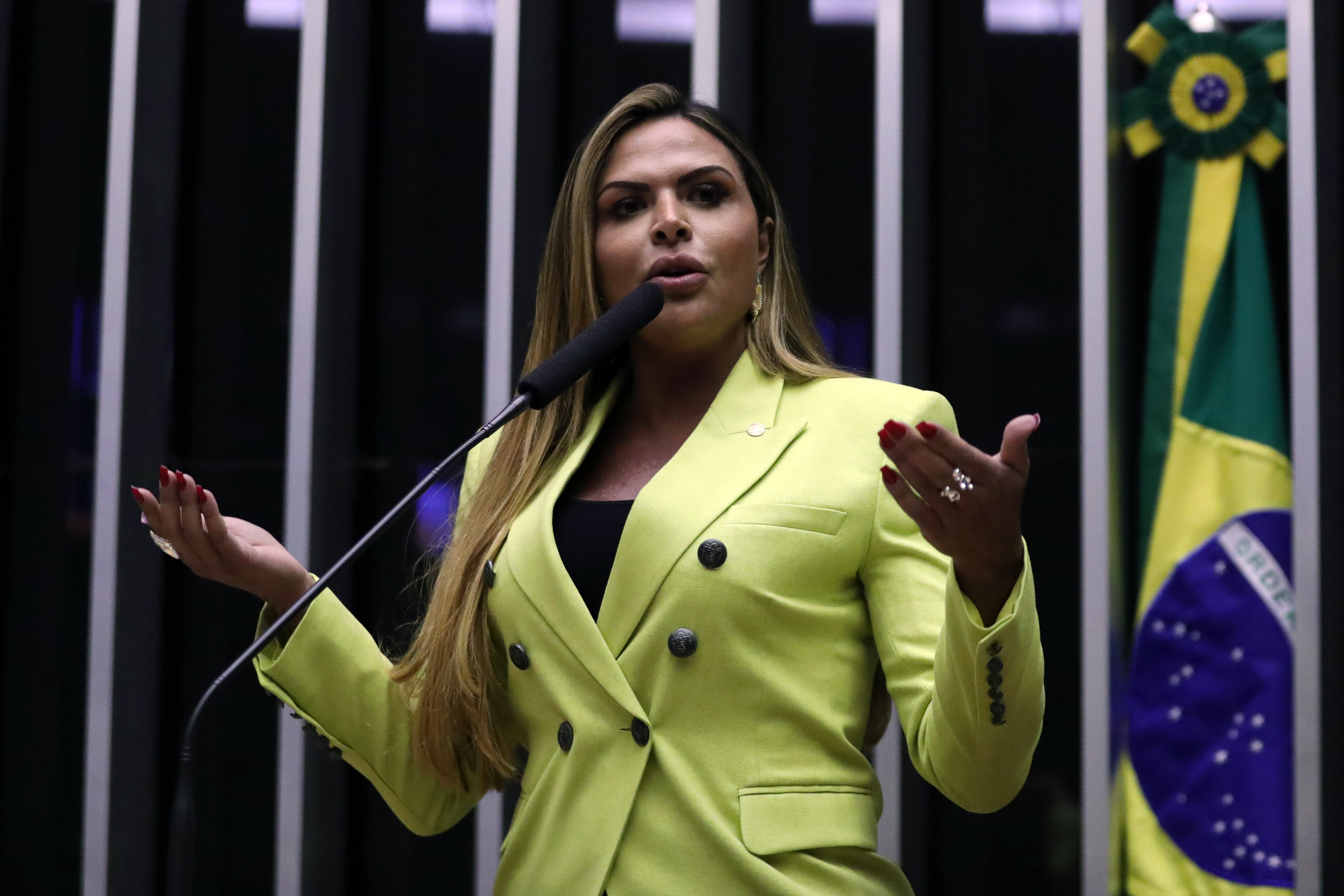
- Alves in 2023

Member of the Chamber of Deputies
- Incumbent
- Assumed office 1 February 2023
- Constituency: Goiás

Personal details
- Born: 8 November 1980 (age 46)
- Party: Brazil Union (since 2022)

Silvye Alves da Silva (born 8 November 1980) is a Brazilian politician serving as a member of the Chamber of Deputies since 2023. From 2011 to 2022, she was a television presenter for Record Goiás.

In the 2022 general election, she was the most-voted candidate for the Chamber of Deputies in Goiás, receiving 254,653 votes in her first run for office. She was re-elected in 2026 as a candidate of the Brazil Union, receiving 78,332 votes.
