= Conceição River =

There are several rivers named Conceição River in Brazil:

- Conceição River (Ceará)
- Conceição River (Rio de Janeiro)
- Conceição River (Rio Grande do Sul)
