= Casais Robustos =

Coordinates: 39°30′N 8°40′W

Casais Robustos Casais Robustos
- Village
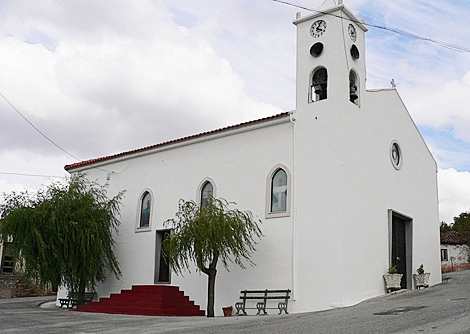
- Church in Casais Robustos

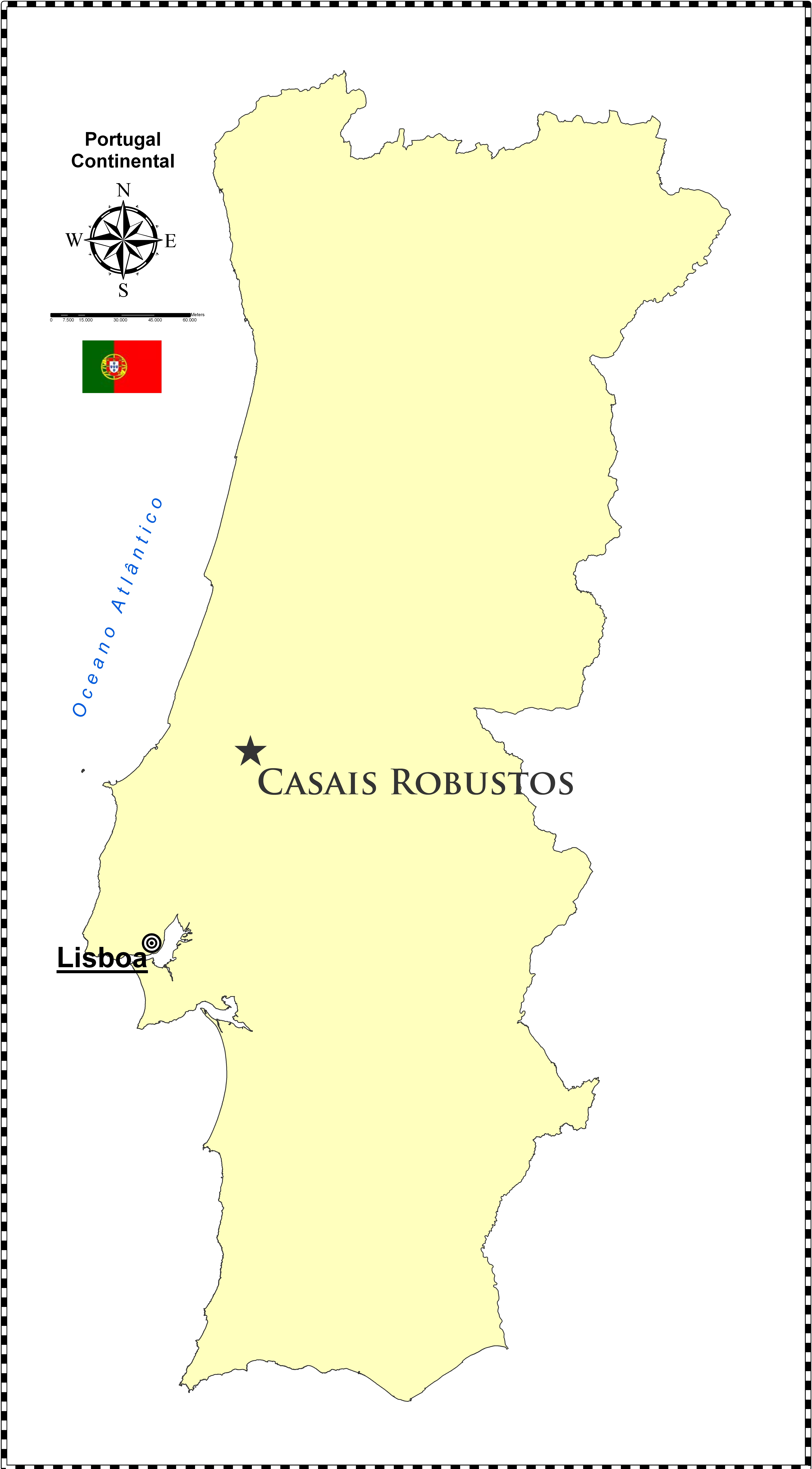
- Country: Portugal
- Region: Ribatejo
- District: Santarém
- Municipality: Alcanena
- Founded: ?

Population (2001)
  - Total: ▲280
- Time zone: UTC
- Postal code: 2380-562

Casais Robustos is a village in Santarém District, Portugal. With a population of 280 inhabitants, it is part of Natural Park of Serras de Aire and Candeeiros.

== Demography ==
Total Population	0-14	15-24	25-64	+65	Men	Women
280	45	41	139	55	137	143

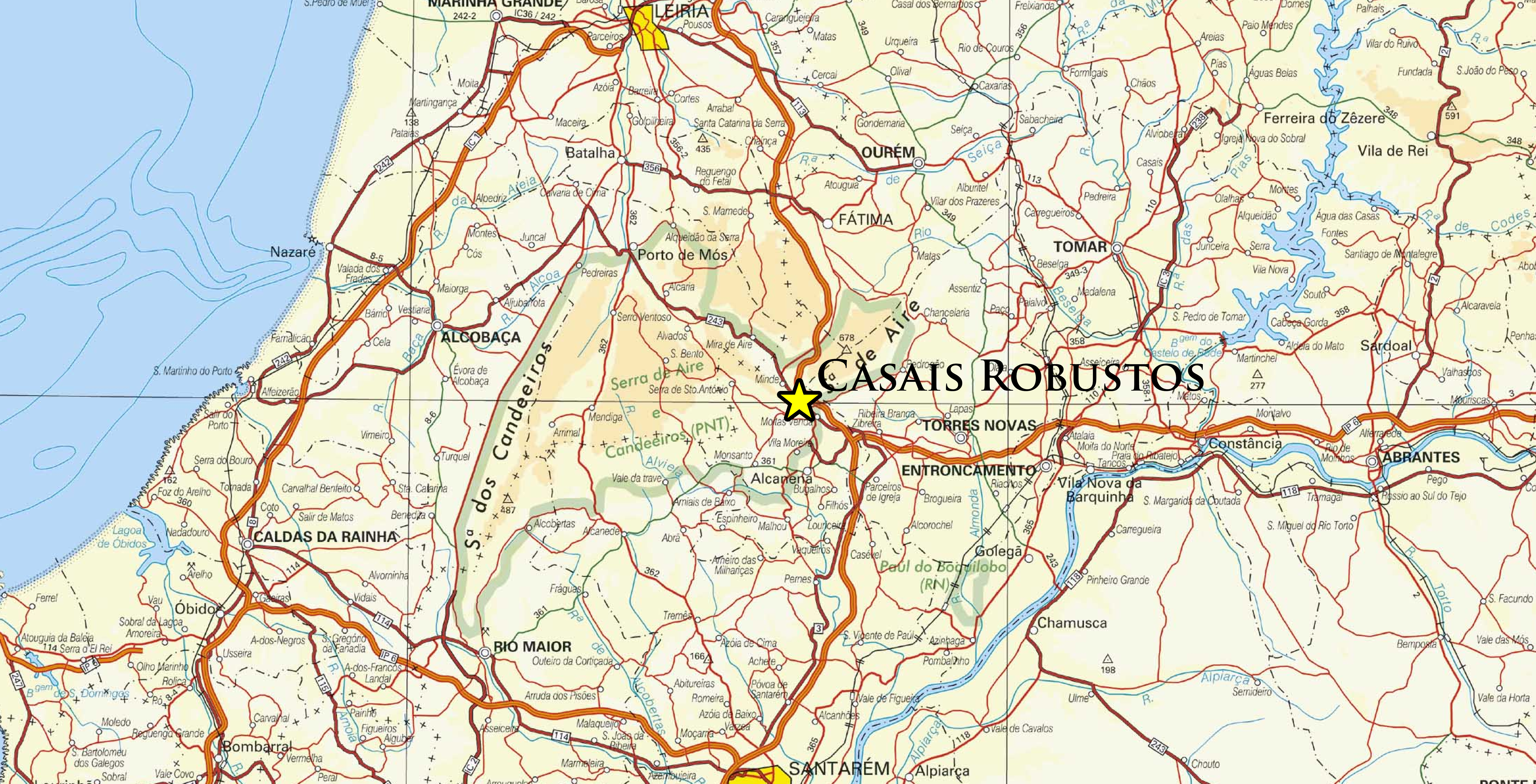
Road Map
