= Conceição dos Ouros =

Coordinates: 22°25′S 45°47′W

- Municipality
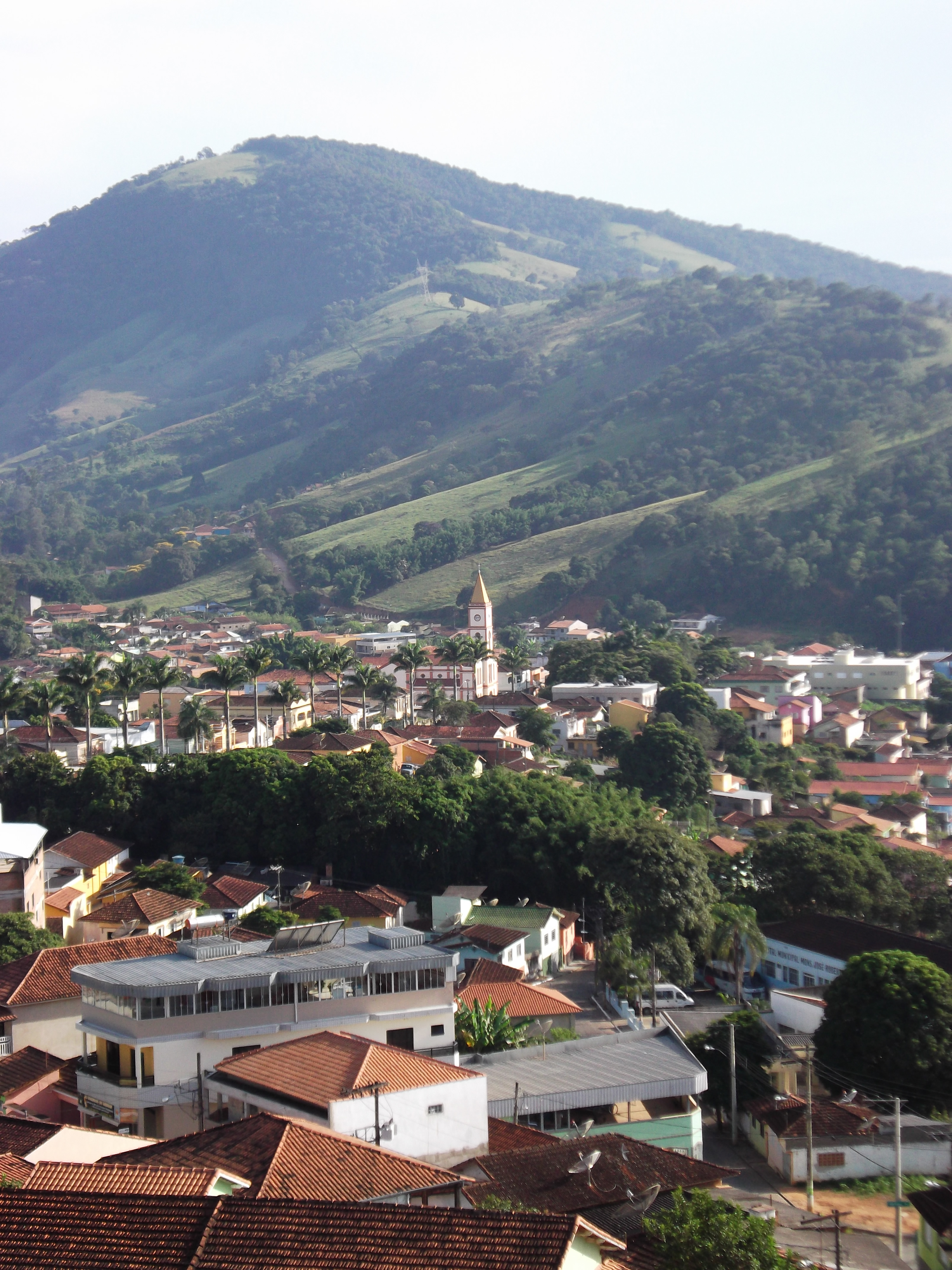

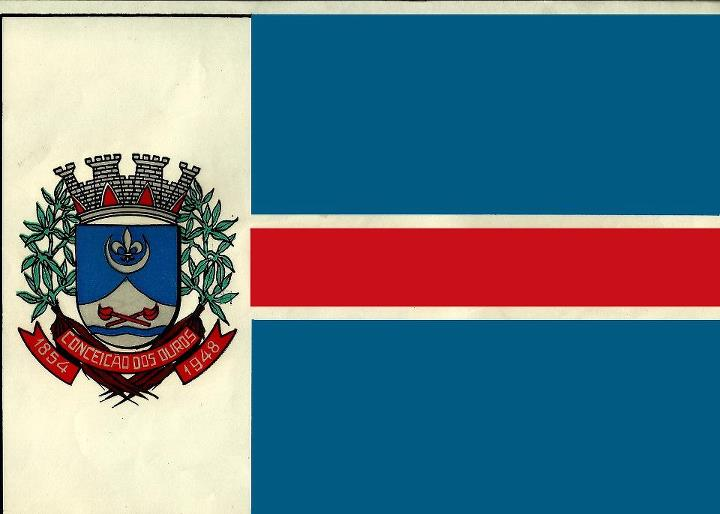
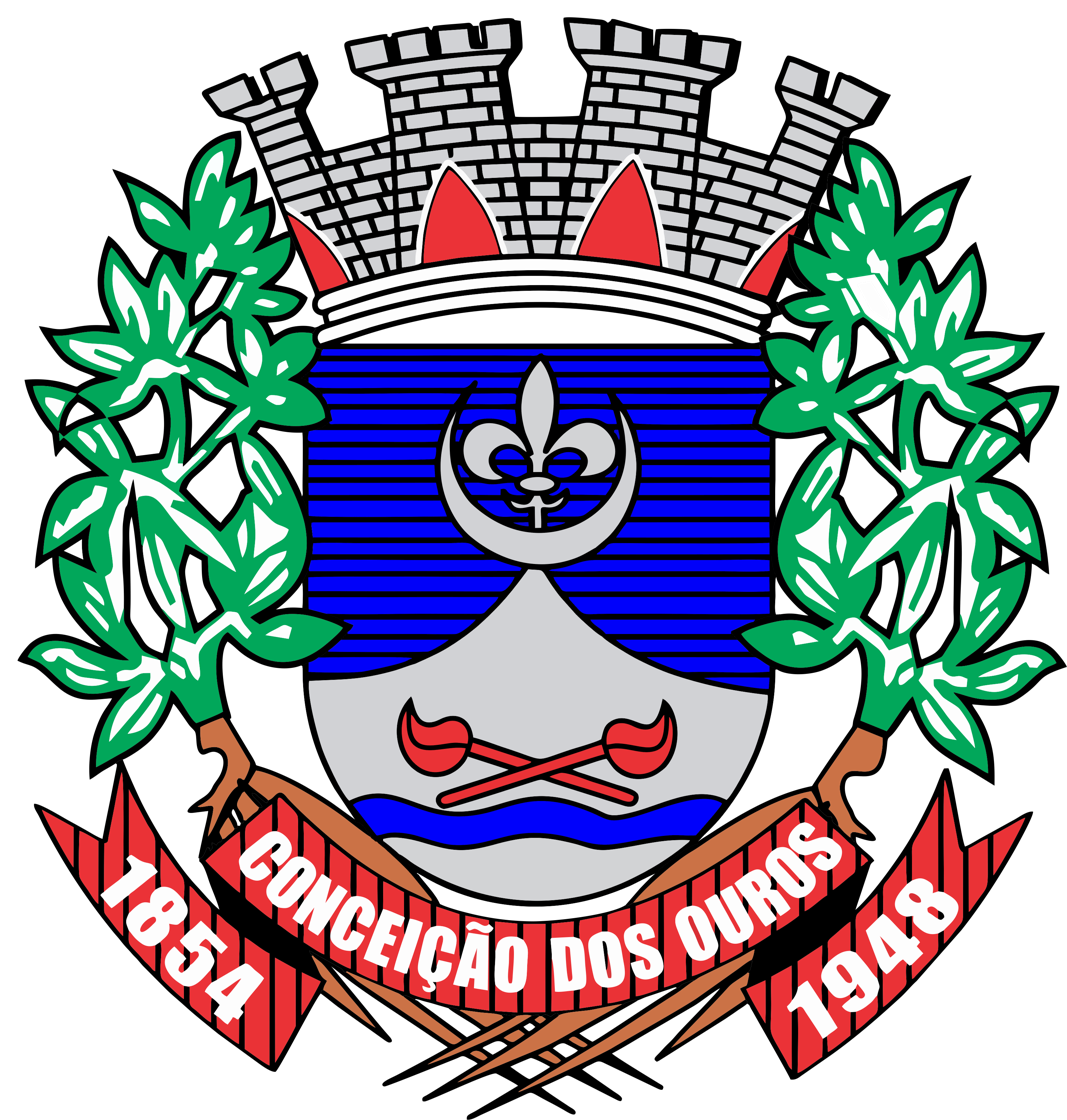
- Flag Coat of arms
- Interactive map of Conceição dos Ouros
- Country: Brazil
- Region: Southeast
- State: Minas Gerais
- Mesoregion: Sul/Sudoeste de Minas

Population (2020)
  - Total: 11,748
- Time zone: UTC−3 (BRT)

Conceição dos Ouros is a municipality in the state of Minas Gerais in the Southeast region of Brazil.

== See also ==
- List of municipalities in Minas Gerais
