= Conceição de Tavira =

- Civil parish
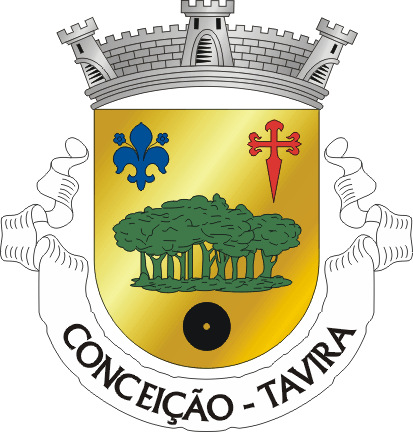
- Coat of arms

- Location in Portugal
- Coordinates: 37°08′N 7°36′W
- Country: Portugal
- Region: Algarve
- Intermunic. comm.: Algarve
- District: Faro
- Municipality: Tavira
- Disbanded: 2013

Area
  - Total: 61.18 km^{2} (23.62 sq mi)

Population (2001)
  - Total: 1,446
  - Density: 23.64/km^{2} (61.21/sq mi)
- Time zone: UTC+00:00 (WET)
  - Summer (DST): UTC+01:00 (WEST)

Conceição de Tavira is a former civil parish in the municipality of Tavira, Portugal. In 2013, the parish merged into the new parish Conceição e Cabanas de Tavira.
