= Vila Viçosa =

- Municipality
- Ducal Palace of Vila Viçosa

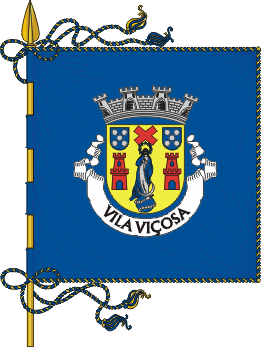
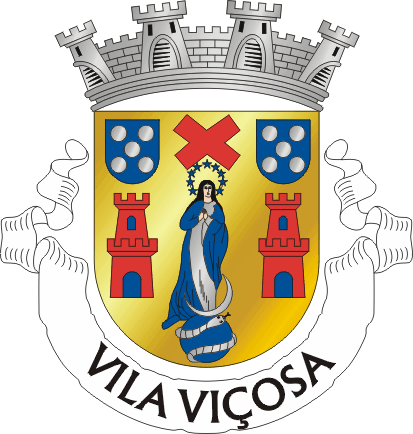
- Flag Coat of arms
- Interactive map of Vila Viçosa
- Coordinates: 38°46′35″N 7°25′05″W
- Country: Portugal
- Region: Alentejo
- Intermunic. comm.: Alentejo Central
- District: Évora
- Parishes: 4

Government
  - President: Inácio Esperança (PSD)

Area
  - Total: 194.86 km^{2} (75.24 sq mi)

Population (2011)
  - Total: 8,319
  - Density: 42.69/km^{2} (110.6/sq mi)
- Time zone: UTC+00:00 (WET)
  - Summer (DST): UTC+01:00 (WEST)
- Local holiday: August 16
- Website: http://www.cm-vilavicosa.pt

Vila Viçosa (Portuguese pronunciation: [ˈvilɐ viˈsɔzɐ]) is a town and a municipality in the District of Évora, Alentejo in Portugal. The population in 2011 was 8,319, in an area of 194.86 km².

The municipal holiday is August 16.

== Parishes ==
Administratively, the municipality is divided into four civil parishes (freguesias):

- Bencatel
- Ciladas
- Nossa Senhora da Conceição e São Bartolomeu
- Pardais

== History ==
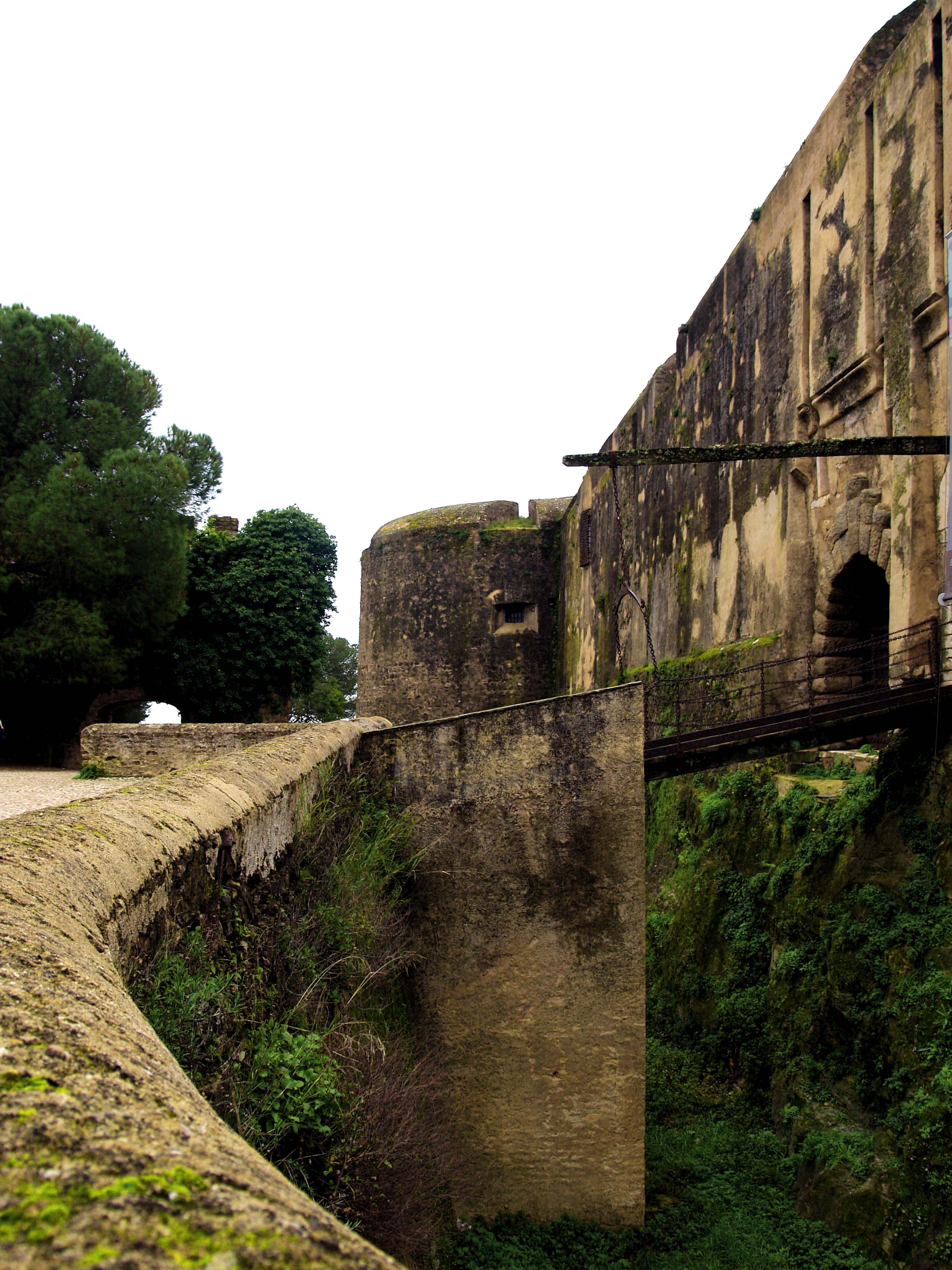
Renaissance fortress of Vila Viçosa

The area of Vila Viçosa has been inhabited since Antiquity, and it was the site of a small settlement in Roman times. The region was part of the Visigoth Kingdom and in the eighth century came under Moorish control after the Muslim conquest of Hispania. Moorish domination ended in 1217, when the region was reconquered by the Order of Aviz, a military order of knighthood that reclaimed large parts of Southern Portugal to the Christians. The order promoted the settlement of Christians in the area during the 13th century. In 1270, King Afonso III granted a foral (letter of feudal rights) to the incipient village of Vila Viçosa. In the early 14th century, King Dinis I built a castle in the village, to protect it from potential Castilian incursions.

In 1461, Vila Viçosa came to the hands of the House of Braganza, one of the most important houses of nobility of Portugal. This event was crucial in the history of the village, which became the main base of the Dukes of Braganza in the next centuries. The Dukes had considerable wealth and greatly promoted the economic, urban and artistic development of the village.

In 1502 the building of the Ducal Palace of Vila Viçosa was begun, sponsored by Jaime, fourth Duke of Braganza. Jaime was a skilled military leader who later led the Portuguese to victory against a Moorish army in the Battle of Azamor, in Morocco. The Ducal Palace was greatly remodelled between the 16th and 17th centuries in a sober late Renaissance (Mannerist) style, and was decorated through the centuries by several artists. The Dukes also sponsored artistic campaigns in several churches and monasteries in the village.

When Duke John became King John IV, in 1640, the House of Braganza moved to the capital Lisbon, and many of the riches of the Ducal Palace were transferred to the Ribeira Palace. Vila Viçosa became a vacation spot for the members of the Braganza family. This marks the beginning of a period of decay for Vila Viçosa.

== Climate ==
Climate data for Vila Viçosa, 1985-2021, altitude: 417 m (1,368 ft)
| Month | Jan | Feb | Mar | Apr | May | Jun | Jul | Aug | Sep | Oct | Nov | Dec | Year |
|---|---|---|---|---|---|---|---|---|---|---|---|---|---|
| Average precipitation mm (inches) | 76.2 (3.00) | 54.7 (2.15) | 49.8 (1.96) | 53.3 (2.10) | 56.1 (2.21) | 12.9 (0.51) | 4.1 (0.16) | 4.3 (0.17) | 29.6 (1.17) | 82.8 (3.26) | 84.7 (3.33) | 89.9 (3.54) | 598.4 (23.56) |
Source: Portuguese Environment Agency

== Economy ==
In the 20th century the industries of marble extraction and tourism became the main income sources of the municipality. Agricultural goods are also still important for its economy. Marble extraction and processing are responsible for around 93% of jobs in the municipality. Since the early 2000s, the displacement of material production outside Europe and the decreasing demand for natural stone have weakened local marble industries, starting an inexorable process of urban shrinking and depopulation.

== Population ==
Population of Vila Viçosa municipality (1801–2011)
| 1801 | 1849 | 1900 | 1930 | 1960 | 1981 | 1991 | 2001 | 2011 |
| 5697 | 5821 | 7163 | 8444 | 9974 | 8546 | 9068 | 8871 | 8319 |

== Notable citizens ==
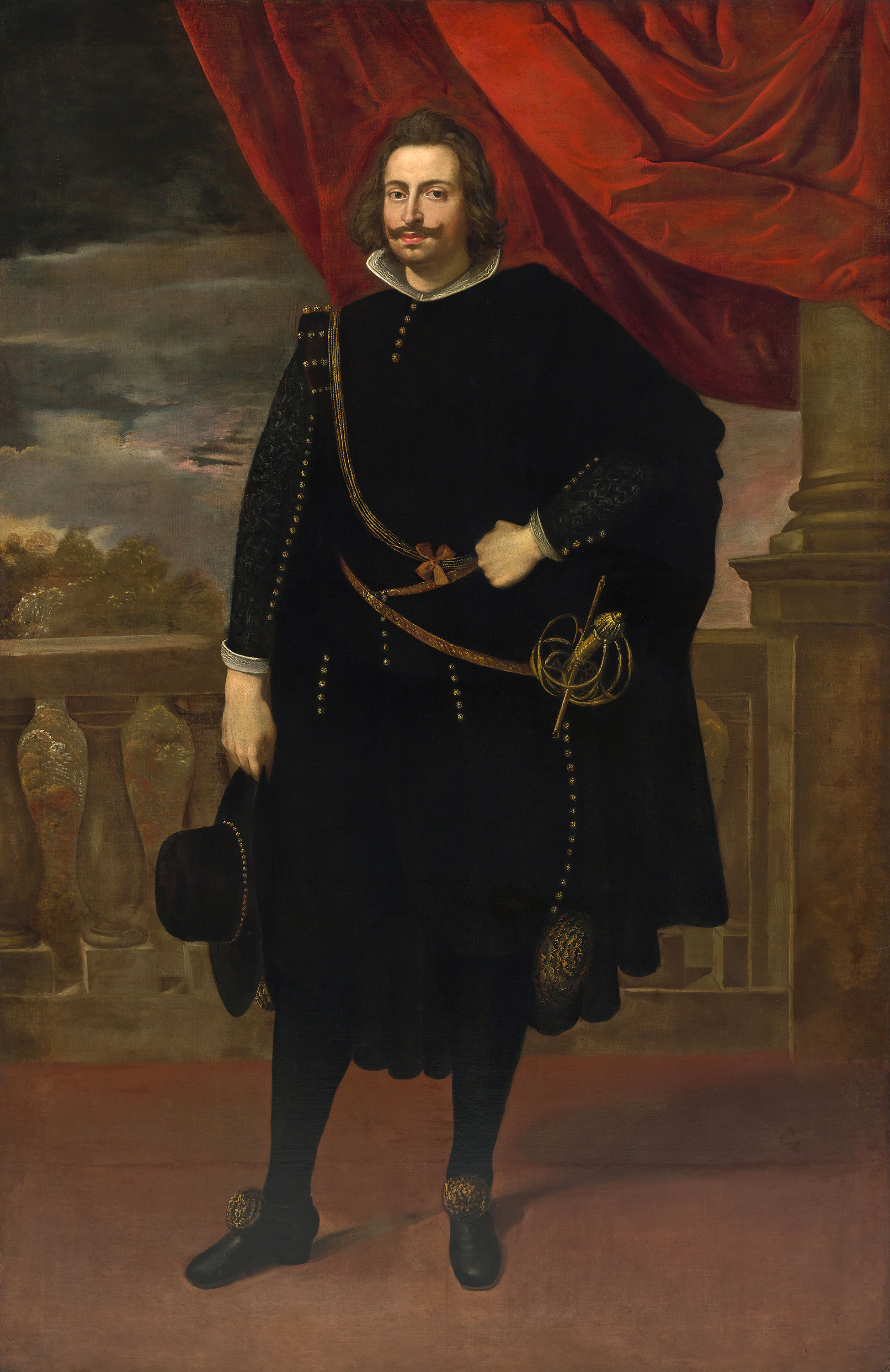
Portrait of King John IV of Portugal & 8th Duke of Braganza, 1630

- Martim Afonso de Sousa (c.1500 – 1564) a Portuguese fidalgo, explorer and Royal Governor of Brazil
- Henrique Henriques (1520–1600) a Portuguese Jesuit priest and missionary in South India.
- Públia Hortênsia de Castro (1548–1595) a scholar and humanist in the court of Catherine of Austria, Queen of Portugal
- Teodósio II, 7th Duke of Braganza (1568–1630) a Portuguese nobleman, father of John IV of Portugal
- King John IV of Portugal (1604–1656), first King of Portugal from the House of Braganza.
- Teodósio, Prince of Brazil (1634–1653) the heir-apparent son of John IV of Portugal and 10th Duke of Braganza
- Joana, Princess of Beira (1635–1653) a Portuguese princess, daughter of John IV of Portugal
- Catherine of Braganza (1638–1705) wife of Charles II of England
- Henrique Pousão (1859-1884) a Portuguese naturalist painter
- Florbela Espanca (1894–1930) a Portuguese poet of passionate and feminist poetry
- Bento de Jesus Caraça (1901–1948) a Portuguese mathematician, economist and statistician.
- Paulo Portas (born 1962) a leading conservative politician, brought up in Vila Viçosa
- Diego da Conceição de Araújo (1549–1597), auxiliary bishop in the Archdiocese of Goa

== Gallery ==
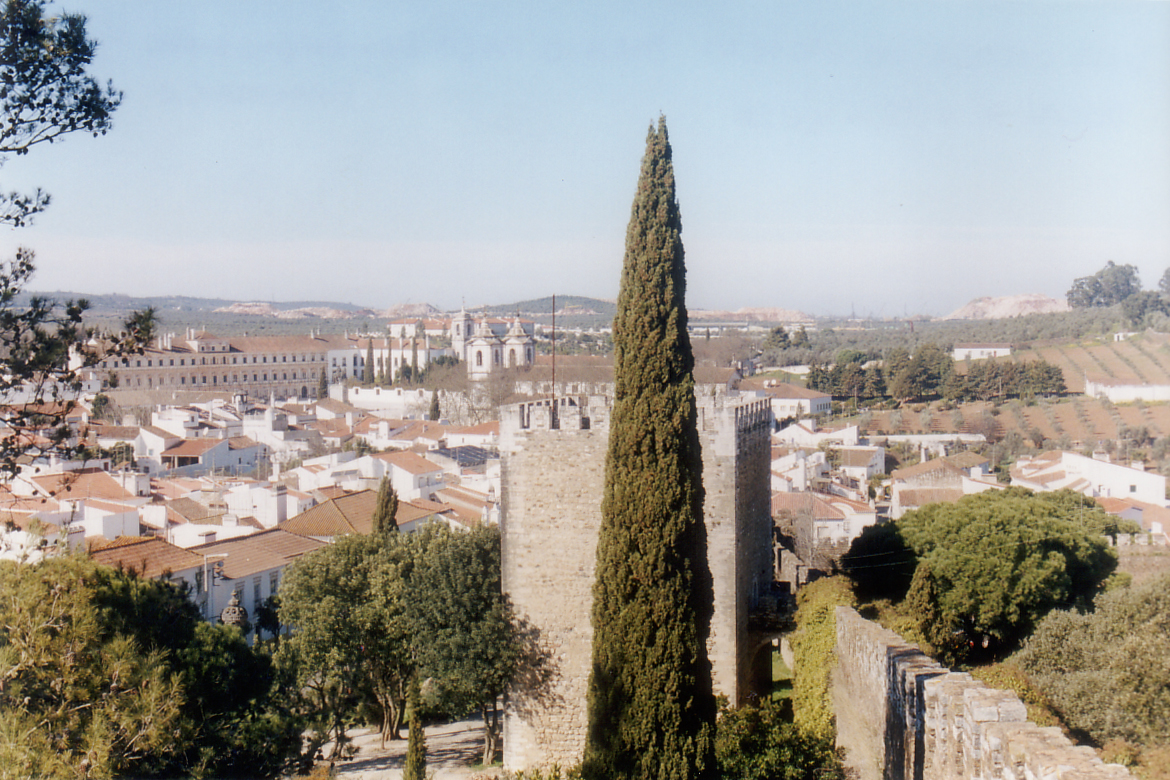
The medieval castle with the town below.

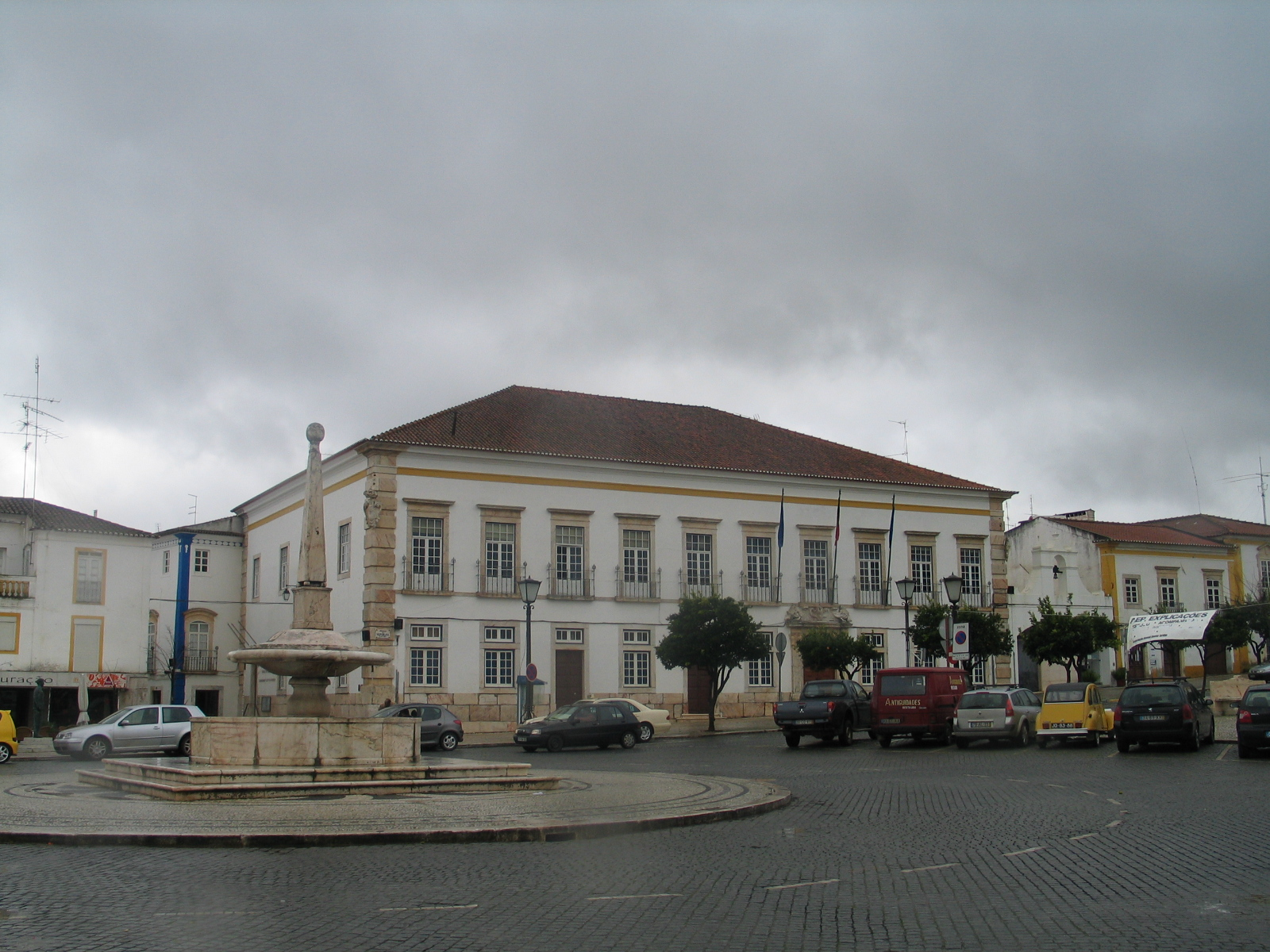
18th century Town Hall.

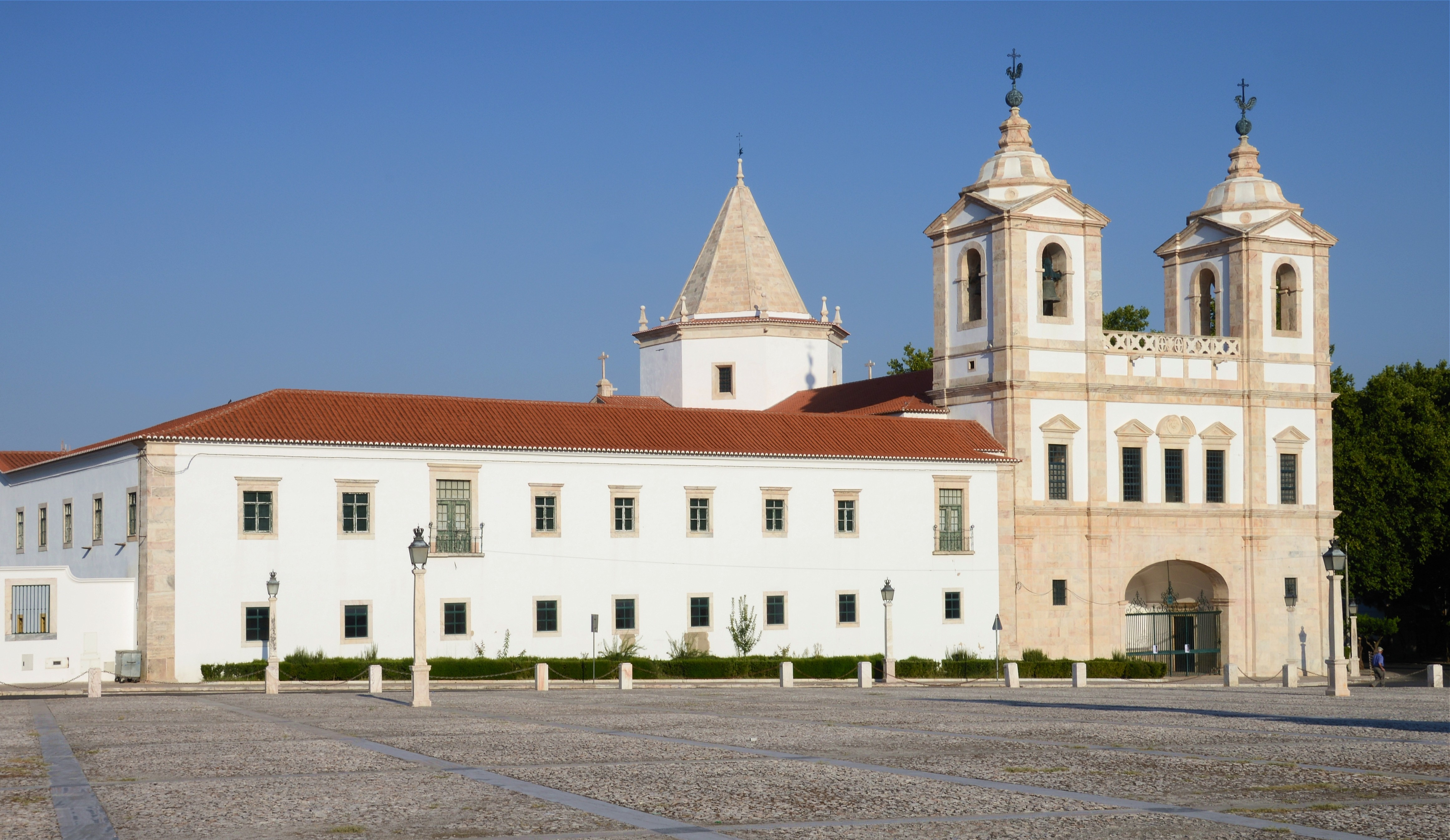
Agostinhos Church, convent and pantheom of the dukes of Braganza

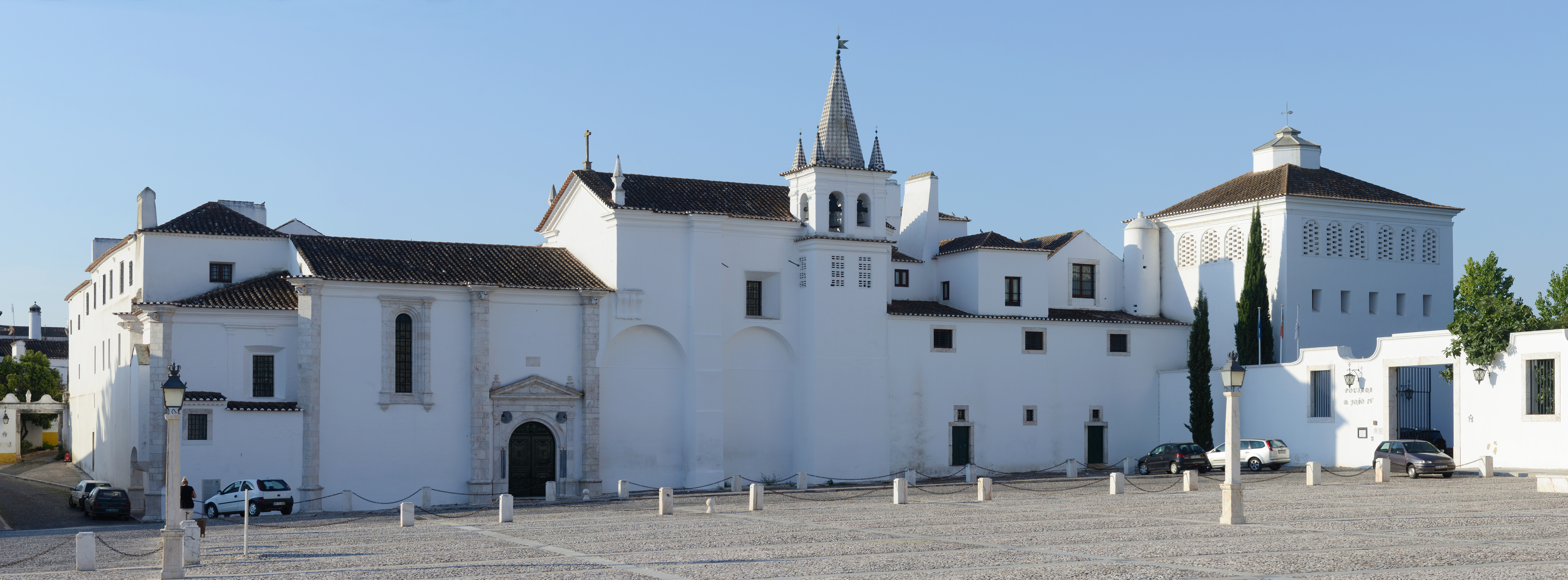
Chagas Convent and pantheom of the duchesses of Braganza

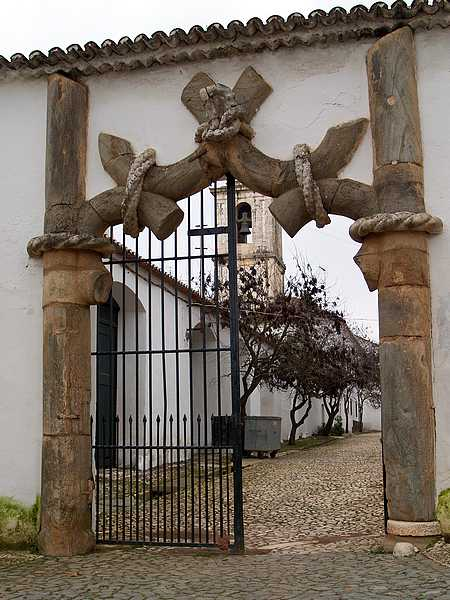
The Door of the Knots

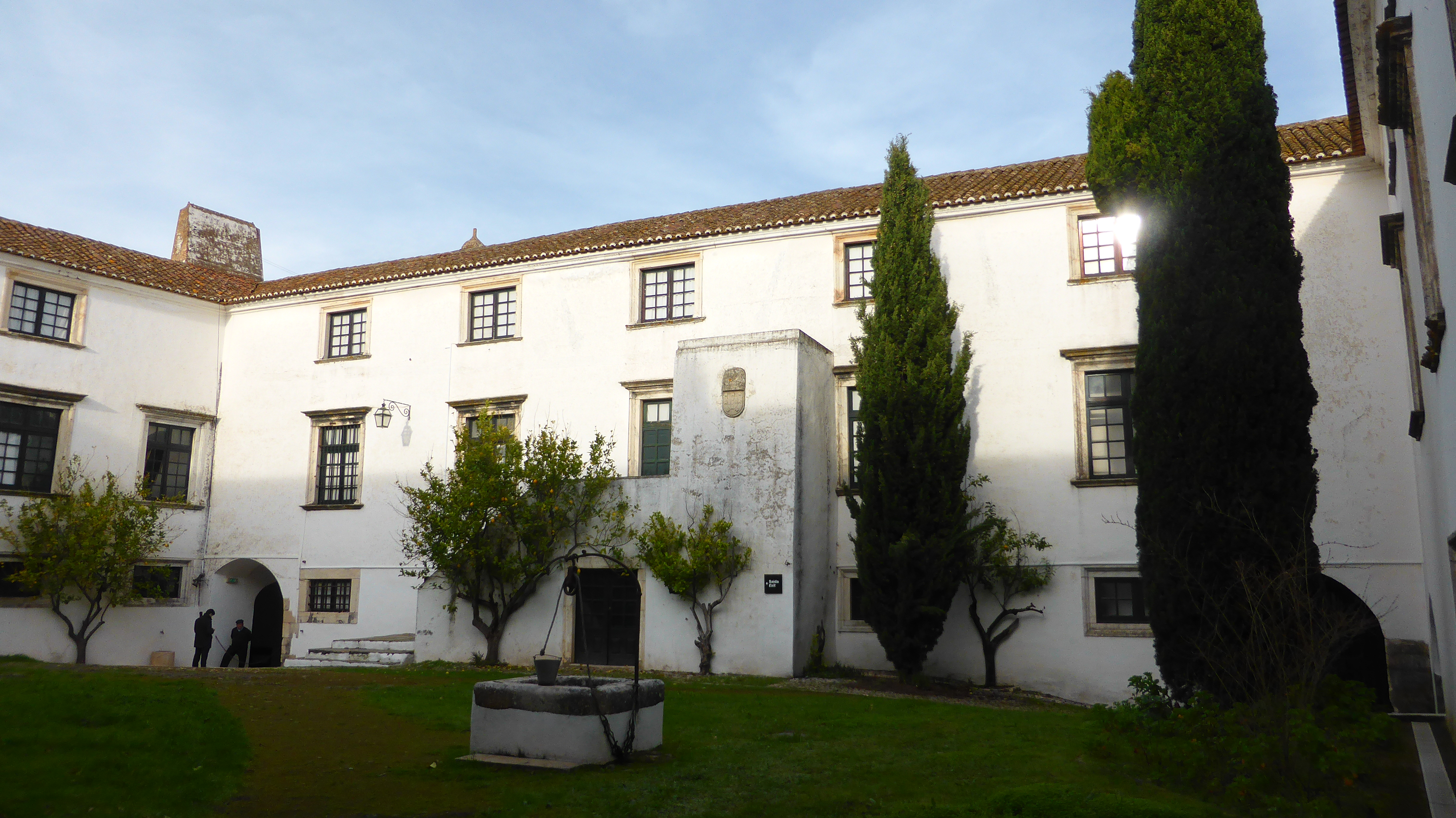
Old Ducal Palace courtyard
