= Conceição (São Paulo Metro) =

São Paulo Metro station

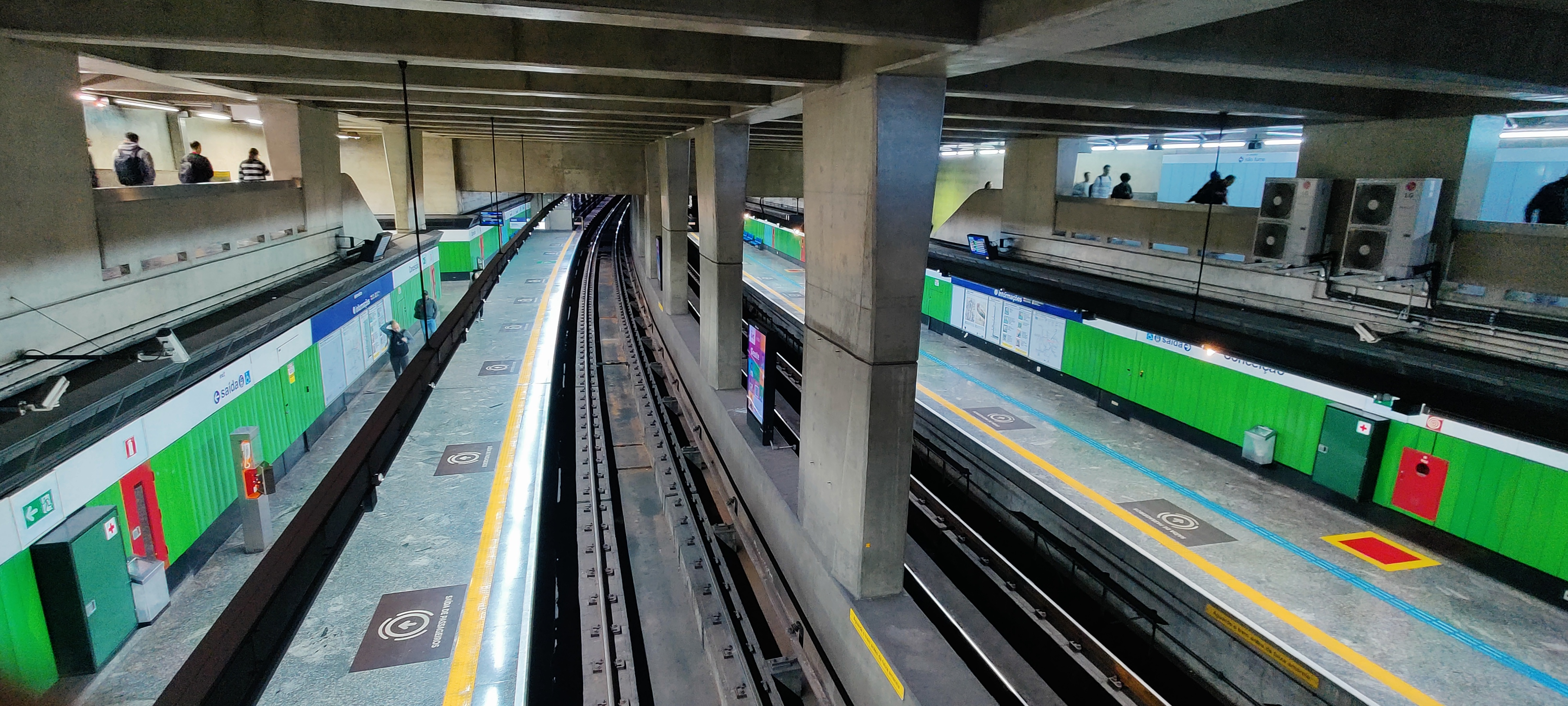
- View of Conceição metro station

General information
- Location: 919 Avenida Engº. Armando de Arruda Pereira; São Paulo; Brazil
- Coordinates: 23.636209°S 46.641142°W
- Owner: Government of the State of São Paulo
- Operator: Companhia do Metropolitano de São Paulo
- Platforms: Side platforms
- Connections: Conceição Bus Terminal

Construction
- Structure type: Underground
- Accessible: y

Other information
- Station code: CON

History
- Opened: September 14, 1974

Passengers
- 26,000/business day

Services
Preceding station	São Paulo Metro	Following station
São Judas towards Tucuruvi	Line 1	Jabaquara Terminus
Track layout
Location

Conceição is a station on Line 1 (Blue) of the São Paulo Metro.

== SPTrans lines ==
The following SPTrans bus lines can be accessed. Passengers may use a Bilhete Único card for transfer:

Line #	Line name
5164/41	Vila Guarani
5701/10	Shop. Morumbi
574J/10	Terminal Vila Carrão
5752/10	Vila Missionária
5757/10	Cidade Júlia
5757/51	Pedreira
5759/10	Parque Primavera
5759/31	Parque Primavera
675P/10	Shopping SP Market
857C/10	Terminal Campo Limpo
