= Conceição do Almeida =

Municipality of Bahia, Brazil

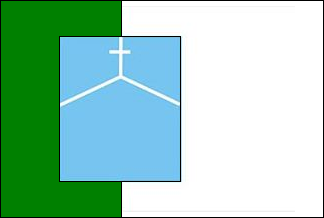
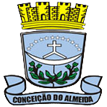
- Flag Coat of arms

- Location of Conceição do Almeida
- Coordinates: 12°37′4″S 39°57′21″W
- Country: Brazil
- Region: Northeast
- State: Bahia

Area
  - Total: 284.836 km^{2} (109.976 sq mi)

Population (2020)
  - Total: 17,165
  - Density: 61.7/km^{2} (160/sq mi)
- Time zone: UTC−3 (BRT)

Conceição do Almeida is a Brazilian municipality in the state of Bahia. Its estimated population as of 2020 was 17,165 inhabitants.
Conceição do Almeida was organized on 18 July 1890, Its territory used to belong to São Felipe.

The anthem was written by the poet Castro Alves.

== See also ==
- List of municipalities in Bahia
