= Estoril Conferences =

International platform held in Cascais, Portugal

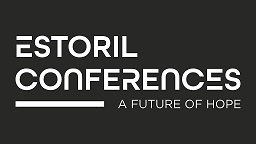
- Estoril Conferences logo
- Founded: 2009 in Estoril, Portugal
- Fate: Active
- Website: estorilconferences.org

Estoril Conferences is an international platform held in Cascais, Portugal, since 2009. It has been attended by Nobel Prize laureates and current and former heads of state. The events provide a platform to promote open dialogue on global challenges. The seventh edition of the Estoril Conferences took place on 1–2 September 2022.

== History ==
The first edition of the Estoril Conferences was held in 2009 in Cascais, Portugal and has since taken place biannually. The conferences have attracted more than 9,000 participants from over seventy countries.

== Editions ==
- 1st edition: Global Challenges, Local Answers, May 2009
- 2nd edition: From Cascais to the World, May 2011
- 3rd edition: The Importance of Youth, May 2013
- 4th edition: A Global Dialogue, May 2015
- 5th edition: Change the World, May 2017
- 6th edition: Empowering Humanity: From Local to Global Justice, May 2019
- 7th edition: The Purpose Generation. Becoming the Change makers of Tomorrow, September 2022

== Speakers ==
From the first edition onward, several high-profile speakers have attended the Estoril Conferences, including Tony Blair, Mikhail Gorbachev, Edward Snowden, Madeleine Albright, Frederik de Klerk, Herman Van Rompuy, Lech Walesa, Shirin Ebadi, Christopher Pissarides, Nouriel Roubini, Mohamed ElBaradei, and Dominique de Villepin.

== Awards ==
Since 2009, the Estoril Conferences have awarded prizes for published work to various authors. The events also highlight local projects, initiatives, and practices under the rubric '"Estoril Local Answers Award". In addition, the conferences have provided research grants to students under thirty for research project proposals, presented in the Portuguese language.

== See also ==
- Globalization
