= Moitas Venda =

- Civil parish
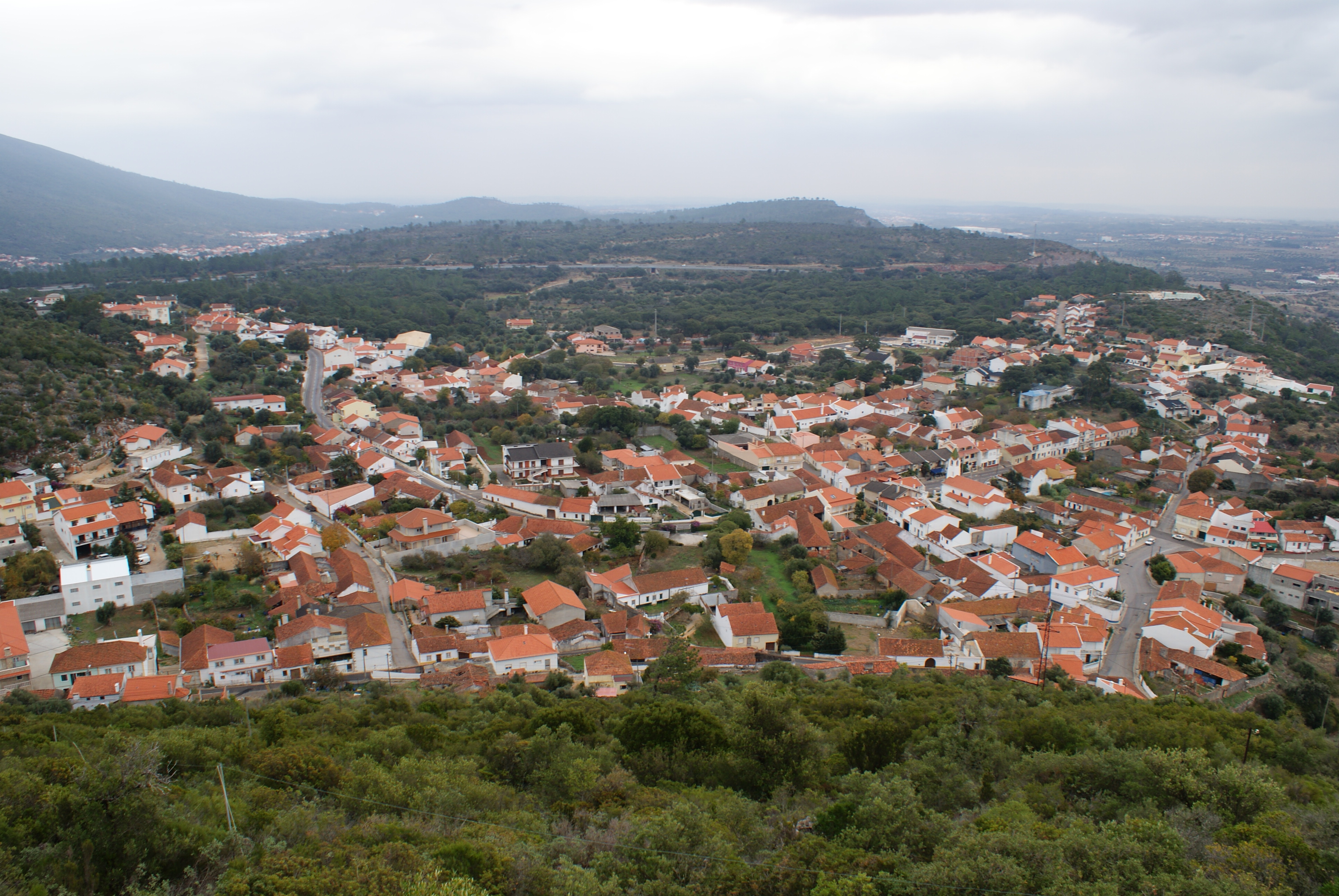
- The village of Moitas Venda in the shadow of the Cabeço de Santa Marta

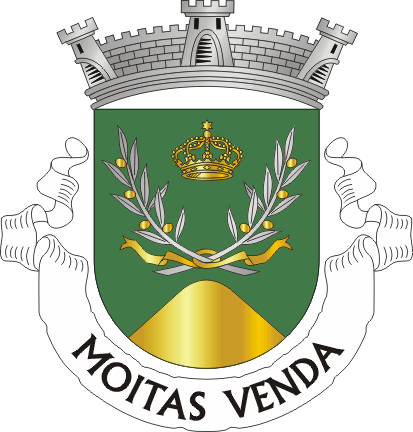
- Coat of arms

- Location in Portugal
- Coordinates: 39.493°N 8.661°W
- Country: Portugal
- Region: Oeste e Vale do Tejo
- Intermunic. comm.: Médio Tejo
- District: Santarém
- Municipality: Alcanena

Area
  - Total: 6.75 km^{2} (2.61 sq mi)

Population (2011)
  - Total: 866
  - Density: 128/km^{2} (332/sq mi)
- Time zone: UTC+00:00 (WET)
  - Summer (DST): UTC+01:00 (WEST)
- Postal code: 2380
- Area code: 249
- Patron: Santa Marta
- Website: http://moitasvenda.net/wiki

Moitas Venda is a civil parish (freguesia) in Alcanena Municipality, in the Médio Tejo Subregion of Oeste e Vale do Tejo Region, Portugal. The population in 2011 was 866, in an area of 6.75 km².

== History ==
The parish was created on 11 April 1925.

== Geography ==
Moitas Venda is situated between the Serras de Aire and Candeeiros, near the Cabeço de Santa Marta.

The parish includes the locality of Casais Robustos.

The Cabeço de Santa Marta, to the north of the municipality of Alcanena is one of the most important lookouts on the Ribatejo. From the heights of Santa Marta, Moitas Venda has a panoramic landscape, that extends towards the Tagus valley.

== Economy ==
Apart from its current agricultural economy (consisting of olive trees and figs), the parish includes several industrial activities: textiles, oils and tanneries. In addition the Feira Franca Anual (Annual Free Fair) is a popular attraction, that extends from its history, that includes artisans in hides and tannery.

== Culture ==
On the pinnacle of the Cabeço de Santa Marta is the Chapel of Santa Marta (Capela de Santa Marta), a hermitage that was the site of hermits and other religious faithful, who lived and cultivated along the flanks of the hilltops cereal grains and pastures. The chapel was constructed during the Middle Ages, and contain several azulejo tiles, including one of the figure of Saint Marta defeating a dragon.
