= Conceição e Cabanas de Tavira =

- Civil parish
- Location in Portugal
- Coordinates: 37.146°N 7.604°W
- Country: Portugal
- Region: Algarve
- Intermunic. comm.: Algarve
- District: Faro
- Municipality: Tavira

Area
  - Total: 69.44 km^{2} (26.81 sq mi)

Population (2011)
  - Total: 2,519
  - Density: 36.28/km^{2} (93.95/sq mi)
- Time zone: UTC+00:00 (WET)
  - Summer (DST): UTC+01:00 (WEST)

Conceição e Cabanas de Tavira is a civil parish in the municipality of Tavira, Portugal. It was formed in 2013 by the merger of the former parishes Conceição de Tavira and Cabanas de Tavira. The population in 2011 was 2,519, in an area of 69.44 km^{2}.
