= Maria da Conceição Gayer =

Brazilian politician and lawyer (1949–2006)

City councilor of Goiânia
- In office January 1, 1983 – December 31, 1987

State deputy of Goiás
- In office February 1, 1987 – January 31, 1991

Personal details
- Born: 4 May 1949 Caiapônia, Goiás, Brazil
- Died: 5 December 2006 (aged 57) Goiânia, Goiás, Brazil
- Party: MDB (1982–1985); PDC (1985–1990); PDT (1990)
- Children: Gustavo Gayer
- Occupation: Police delegate Lawyer

Maria da Conceição Gayer (May 4, 1949 – December 5, 2006) was a Brazilian lawyer, police officer and politician. She served as a Goiânia city councillor and Goiás state deputy.

== Biography ==
=== First years and education ===
His grandfather, Plínio Gayer, was a federal deputy from Goiás with 8,405 votes for the Social Democratic Party (PSD) in the 39th legislature. Plínio Gayer committed suicide on the premises of the Chamber of Deputies in Rio de Janeiro on July 8, 1953.

The daughter of Mauro Ferreira de Lima and Zilah Gayer de Lima, Maria was born in the town of Caiapônia, in the interior of the state of Goiás, in 1949. He began his political engagement while still at school in the Nestório Ribeiro Student Guild in the city of Jataí, still in the interior of the state. With a family connection to the PSD, in 1965 she founded the women's wing of the party in the city. He moved to Goiânia, capital of Goiás, to study law at the Pontifical Catholic University of Goiás (PUC Goiás) where he graduated in 1972.

=== Career ===
Before graduating in law, she worked as an elementary school teacher. After graduating, she worked at the police station for juvenile offenders between 1979 and 1981. She also worked as a director of women's social clubs, in philanthropic institutions – such as APAE in Goiânia – and was a consumer protection delegate.

== Political ==
Aligned with progressive agendas, such as feminism and the defense of the rights of young people and children, she joined the Brazilian Democratic Movement (MDB), a party opposed to the country's military dictatorship. In 1982, she was elected as a city councillor for the party, was the most voted candidate in the election, receiving a total of 10,003 votes. She was the first woman of history to become president of Municipal Chamber of Goiânia, albeit for a short time (February 1–9, 1983). Between 1983 and 1984 she was Secretary of Government for Extraordinary Affairs in the Íris Rezende government.

She left the MDB and was one of the founders of the Christian Democratic Party (PDC) in Goiás. In the 1986 state elections of Goiás, she received 10,034 votes, the fourth most in her party and the only woman elected alongside Cleuzita de Assis (PFL). In 1990, as a member of the Democratic Labor Party (PDT), she stood for re-election. He won only 772 votes and was left as an alternate.

=== Electoral performance ===
Year	Office	Party	Votes	Result	Ref.
1982	Councillor of Goiânia	MDB	10,003	Elected	
1986	State deputy of Goiás	PDC	10,034	Elected	
1990	State deputy of Goiás	PDT	772	Not elected	

== Personal life ==
She had three children, Renata, Frederico and Gustavo. Gustavo Gayer became a federal deputy for Goiás, being closely associated with the Brazilian far right and former president Jair Bolsonaro. Frederico Gayer, who is married to Luana Ribeiro, a state deputy for Tocantins ex-representing and the daughter of Senator João Ribeiro. In March 2014, Frederico Gayer was sentenced to 12 years and six months in prison, to be served in a closed regime, for aggravated homicide in connection with the death of Hebert Resende. The crime occurred in the early hours of April 5, 1997, in front of the Draft nightclub in Goiânia. At the time, Frederico Gayer was serving as a police officer, appointed by the Goiás state government without having passed a public civil service exam.

=== Death ===
Maria died at the age of 57 in Goiânia after suffering a heart attack.
