= Maria da Conceição Zagalo =

Portuguese business and nonprofit executive and city councillor (born 1952)

- Born: 13 October 1952; Ribatejo Province, Portugal
- Occupation(s): Business executive, nonprofit executive, and city councillor
- Known for: Work related to communications and Corporate Social Responsibility
- Children: Two daughters

Maria da Conceição Zagalo (born 1952) was a leading Portuguese business executive, who plays an important role in promoting Corporate Social Responsibility, executive volunteering, women's leadership and youth leadership development in Portugal. Between 2017 and 2020 she was also a Lisbon City councillor.

== Career ==
Maria da Conceição Barroso da Cunha Gameiro Zagalo was born on 13 October 1952, in what was then the Ribatejo Province of Portugal. She studied in primary school in her home town of Riachos and in secondary school at Torres Novas. She did not go to university. She started working for IBM in Portugal in 1973, holding administrative functions there until 1987. After a spell in marketing, Zagalo became responsible for media and public relations with the same company, being appointed director of communications and external programmes in 1998. In 2009 she was also appointed head of marketing. She was a member of the board of directors of IBM Portugal, between 2000 and April 2011, when she left IBM. While working with IBM she also taught at the Instituto Superior de Línguas e Administração (ISLA).

Representing IBM, Zagalo became a founding member in 2000 of Grupo de Reflexão e Apoio à Cidadania Empresarial (Reflection and Support Group for Corporate Citizenship – GRACE), which promotes Corporate Social Responsibility (CSR) and which has a project to promote volunteering by Portuguese executives. She became the president of the board of GRACE and Portugal's representative on the board of CSR Europe. In April 2010, she was appointed president of the general assembly of the Portuguese Business Communication Association (APCE) and received the APCE Lifetime Achievement Award in 2011. She has worked closely with Acredita Portugal, an association that promotes entrepreneurship.

Zagalo has been closely associated with the Portuguese wing of AIESEC, an international youth-run NGO that provides young people with leadership development, cross-cultural internships, and global volunteer exchange opportunities, with the aim of empowering young people to make a social impact. She has also represented Portugal on the Global Council of AIESEC International. She is president of the fiscal council of Maratona da Saúde, a nonprofit organization that aims to fund scientific research to accelerate the discovery of innovative treatments and cures for various diseases. In 2017, she was elected to the Lisbon Municipal Council, as a representative of the conservative CDS – People's Party, a position she resigned from in May 2020. In 2018 she became the president of the General Assembly of the NGO, CAIS, which aims to support people suffering from social exclusion.

== Awards and honours ==
- In 2007 Zagalo was given an award by Amnesty International, as one of 25 women worldwide, "for her special dedication to social causes".
- In 2013 the Federation of European Internal Communication Associations, awarded Zagalo its Diploma of Honour.
- In 2018 she was awarded the Prémio Femina de Honra, 2018, the leading award given to women in Portugal.
