= Maria da Conceição (d. 1798) =

Maria da Conceição (died 1798, São Paulo), was an alleged Brazilian witch.

According to some modern sources, Maria da Conceição was allegedly active as a cunning woman. She was said to be known for her great knowledge of medicinal herbs, which she used to manufacture medicine for use in her work as a herbalist physician. She eventually came into conflict with a priest, Father Luis, who was opposed to herbal medicine.

According to the same sources, Father Luis accused her of heresy and witchcraft. Maria da Conceição was put on trial, allegedly judged guilty as charged, and executed by burning.
