= Conceição do Rio Verde =

Town and municipality in the state of Minas Gerais, Brazil

Coordinates: 21°53′S 45°05′W

- Municipality
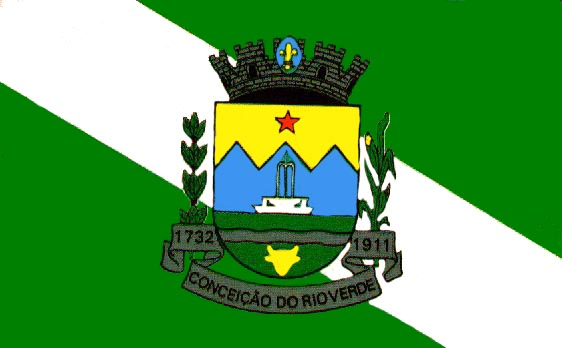
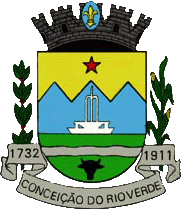
- Flag Coat of arms
- Interactive map of Conceição do Rio Verde
- Country: Brazil
- State: Minas Gerais
- Region: Southeast
- Time zone: UTC−3 (BRT)

Conceição do Rio Verde is a Brazilian municipality of the state of Minas Gerais. Its population is 13,684 (2020 estimate).

== See also ==
- List of municipalities in Minas Gerais
