= Maria da Conceição Moita =

Portuguese educator and activist (1937–2021)

- Born: 5 April 1937; Alcanena, Portugal
- Died: 30 March 2021 (aged 83)
- Occupations: educator and activist

Maria da Conceição Moita also known as Xexão (5 April 1937 – 30 March 2021) was a Portuguese educator and activist in the fight against the dictatorship of Estado Novo. She participated in protests against dictatorship and the Portuguese Colonial War and gave logistical support to the Brigadas Revolucionárias. On 30 December 1972, Moita was a part of a religious vigil in Capela do Rato where she announced a hunger strike against the government and against the Catholic hierarchy for not speaking out against the dictatorship. She was noted later as having been the person who properly envisioned the "wonderful fruits of the Second Vatican Council" in Portugal. She was arrested by the PIDE in December 1973, and was released after 25 April 1974.

Moita died on 30 March 2021, aged 83. The Portuguese Parliament paid tribute to the death of Conceição Moita. They unanimously approved a vote of condolence and was signed by the president of the parliament, Ferro Rodrigues and by deputies from all parties.
