= List of Odonata species in the Morais Natura 2000 Site =

This partial list comprises some of the Odonata species which occur in Morais Natura 2000 Site (PTCON0023) located in the northeast of Portugal.

The list is in taxonomic order. The common name of each species is given, followed by its scientific name.

== List ==
=== Suborder Zygoptera (damselflies) ===
==== Family Calopterygidae (demoiselles) ====
| Species | Scientific name |
|---|---|
| Copper demoiselle | Calopteryx haemorrhoidalis |
| Beautiful demoiselle | Calopteryx virgo |

==== Family Lestidae (emerald damselflies) ====
| Species | Scientific name |
|---|---|
| Willow emerald damselfly | Lestes viridis |
| Scarce emerald damselfly | Lestes dryas |
| Southern emerald damselfly | Lestes barbarus |

==== Family Coenagrionidae (blue, blue-tailed, and red damselflies) ====
| Species | Scientific name |
|---|---|
| Variable damselfly | Coenagrion pulchellum |
| Iberian bluetail | Ischnura graellsii |
| Scarce blue-tailed damselfly | Ischnura pumilio |
| Large red damselfly | Pyrrhosoma nymphula |

=== Suborder Anisoptera (dragonflies) ===
==== Family Gomphidae (club-tailed dragonflies) ====
| Species | Scientific name |
|---|---|
| Western clubtail | Gomphus pulchellus |
| Large pincertail | Onychogomphus uncatus |

==== Family Aeshnidae (hawkers and emperors) ====
| Species | Scientific name |
|---|---|
| Emperor | Anax imperator |
| Hairy dragonfly | Brachytron pratense |
| | Boyeria irene |

==== Family Cordulegastridae (golden-ringed dragonflies) ====
| Species | Scientific name |
|---|---|
| Golden-ringed dragonfly | Cordulegaster boltonii |

==== Family Libellulidae (chasers, skimmers, and darters) ====
| Species | Scientific name |
|---|---|
| Broad-bodied chaser | Libellula depressa |
| Black-tailed skimmer | Orthetrum cancellatum |
| Scarlet dragonfly | Crocothemis erythraea |
| Yellow-winged darter^{[F]} | Sympetrum flaveolum |
| Ruddy darter | Sympetrum sanguineum |
| Violet dropwing | Trithemis annulata |

== See also ==
- Morais Ophiolite Complex
- Morais Natura 2000 Site
- Azibo Reservoir Protected Landscape
- Macedo de Cavaleiros Municipality
- Morais (Macedo de Cavaleiros)
- List of Birds of Azibo Reservoir Protected Landscape
