= Synchronized swimming at the 2000 Summer Olympics – Women's duet =

Women's duet at the Games of the XXVII Olympiad
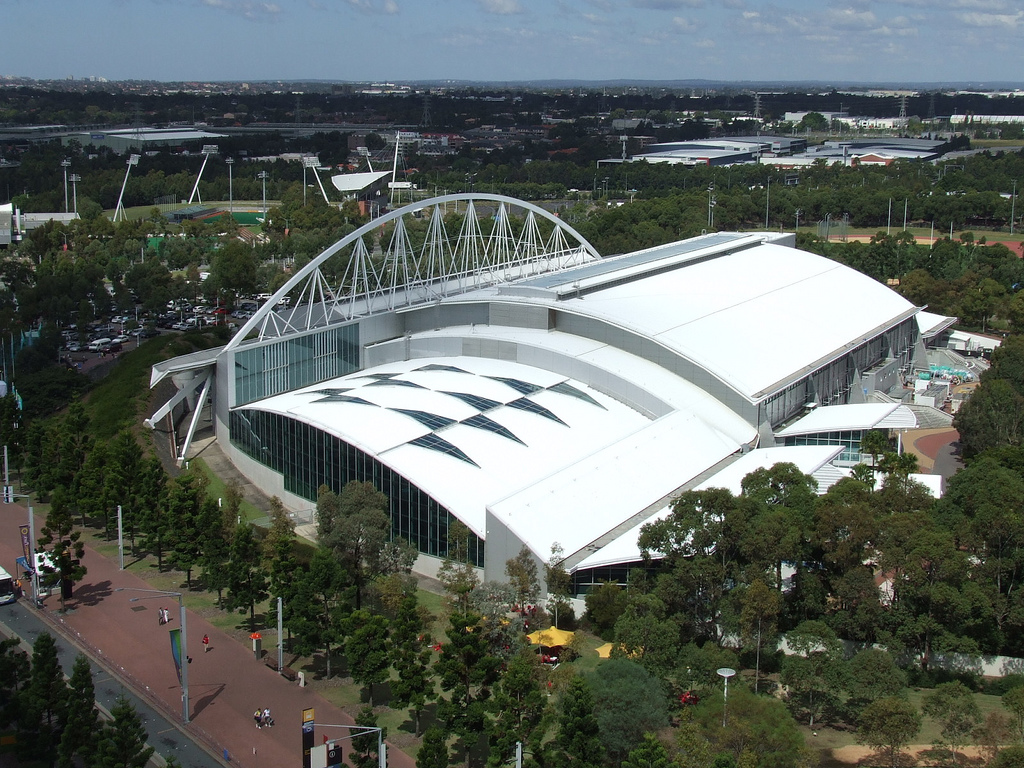
- Aquatic Centre in Sydney
- Venue: Sydney International Aquatic Centre
- Date: 24–26 September
- Competitors: 48 from 24 nations
- Winning points: 99.580

Medalists
1st place, gold medalist(s)		Olga Brusnikina; Maria Kisseleva	Russia
2nd place, silver medalist(s)		Miya Tachibana; Miho Takeda	Japan
3rd place, bronze medalist(s)		Virginie Dedieu; Myriam Lignot	France

The women's duet event at the 2000 Summer Olympics in Sydney, Australia, took place inside the Sydney International Aquatic Centre from 24 to 26 September.

The preliminary phase consisted of a technical routine and a free routine. The scores from the two routines were added together and the top 12 duets qualified for the final.

The final consisted of one free routine, the score from the final free routine was added to the score from the preliminary technical routine to decide the overall winners.

== Schedule ==
All times are Australia Standard Time (UTC+11)

Date	Time	Round
Sunday, September 24, 2000	14:00	Preliminary technical routine
Monday, September 25, 2000	17:00	Preliminary free routine
Tuesday, September 26, 2000	14:00	Final free routine

== Results ==
=== Qualification ===
Rank	Country	Athlete	Technical	Free	Total
1	Russia	Olga Brusnikina & Maria Kisseleva	34.580	64.480	99.060
2	Japan	Miya Tachibana & Miho Takeda	34.300	63.960	98.260
3	France	Virginie Dedieu & Myriam Lignot	33.997	63.094	97.091
4	United States	Anna Kozlova & Tuesday Middaugh	33.810	62.920	96.730
5	Canada	Claire Carver-Dias & Fanny Létourneau	33.670	62.920	96.730
6	Italy	Maurizia Cecconi & Alessia Lucchini	33.203	61.750	94.953
7	China	Li Min & Li Yuanyuan	33.250	61.620	94.870
8	Spain	Gemma Mengual & Paola Tirados	32.900	60.926	93.826
9	Mexico	Erika Leal & Lilian Leal	32.527	60.190	92.717
10	South Korea	Jang Yoon-kyeong & Yoo Na-mi	32.200	59.930	92.130
11	Switzerland	Madeleine Perk & Belinda Schmid	32.153	59.930	92.083
12	Brazil	Carolina Moraes & Isabela Moraes	31.593	59.280	90.873
13	Greece	Christina Thalassinidou & Despoina Theodoridou	31.733	58.630	90.363
14	Ukraine	Iryna Rudnytska & Olesya Zaytseva	30.987	58.196	89.183
15	Czech Republic	Soňa Bernardová & Jana Rybářová	31.033	57.704	88.537
16	Australia	Irena Olevsky & Naomi Young	30.543	56.464	87.007
17	North Korea	Choe Son-yong & Jo Young-hui	29.867	56.204	86.071
18	Cuba	Kenia Pérez & Yamisleidys Romay	29.913	55.596	85.509
19	Belarus	Khrystsina Nadezhdina & Natallia Sakharuk	30.287	55.164	85.451
20	Egypt	Heba Abdel Gawad & Sara Abdel Gawad	29.727	55.294	85.021
21	Venezuela	Jenny Castro & Virginia Ruíz	29.750	54.036	83.786
22	Kazakhstan	Aliya Karimova & Galina Shatnaya	29.120	54.254	83.374
23	Hungary	Zsuzsanna Hámori & Petra Marschalkó	28.957	52.520	81.477
24	Slovakia	Lívia Allárová & Lucia Allárová	28.187	51.826	80.013

=== Final ===
Rank	Country	Athlete	Technical	Free	Total
1st place, gold medalist(s)	Russia	Olga Brusnikina & Maria Kisseleva	34.580	65.000	99.580
2nd place, silver medalist(s)	Japan	Miya Tachibana & Miho Takeda	34.300	64.350	98.650
3rd place, bronze medalist(s)	France	Virginie Dedieu & Myriam Lignot	33.997	63.440	97.437
4	United States	Anna Kozlova & Tuesday Middaugh	33.810	63.180	96.990
5	Canada	Claire Carver-Dias & Fanny Létourneau	33.670	62.314	95.974
6	Italy	Maurizia Cecconi & Alessia Lucchini	33.203	62.184	95.387
7	China	Li Min & Li Yuanyuan	33.250	61.534	94.784
8	Spain	Gemma Mengual & Paola Tirados	32.900	61.620	94.520
9	Mexico	Erika Leal & Lilian Leal	32.527	60.234	92.761
10	Switzerland	Madeleine Perk & Belinda Schmid	32.153	59.886	92.039
11	South Korea	Jang Yoon-kyeong & Yoo Na-mi	32.200	59.626	91.826
12	Brazil	Carolina Moraes & Isabela Moraes	31.593	59.150	90.743
