= Morais =

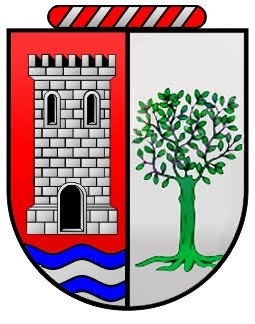
- Coat of arms associated with the Morais surname

Origin
- Region of origin: Morais, Macedo de Cavaleiros, Bragança District, Northern Portugal

Other names
- Variant form: Moraes (archaic spelling)

Morais or Moraes (the latter is an archaic spelling in Portugal, but contemporary in Brazil and Goa (India) — [mo'ɾajʃ] or [mo'ɾajs] for both variants) is a Portuguese surname.

The link between Morais/Moraes and the Spanish surname Morales is controversial.

Notable people with the name include:

== Mononym ==
- Morais (footballer, born 1948), José Francisco de Morais, Brazilian football centre-back
- Morais (footballer, born 1984), Manoel Morais Amorim, Brazilian football attacking midfielder

== Moraes ==
- Abrahão de Moraes (1916–1970), Brazilian astronomer and mathematician
- Adriano Moraes (bull rider) (born 1970), Brazilian rodeo performer
- Alexandre de Moraes (born 1968), Brazilian jurist
- Alinne Moraes (born 1982), Brazilian actress
- Antônio Ermírio de Moraes (1928–2014), Brazilian businessman and billionaire
- Carolina Moraes (born 1980), Brazilian synchronized swimmer
- Celso de Moraes (born 1949), Brazilian hammer thrower
- Cícero Moraes (born 1982), Brazilian 3D designer
- Claude Moraes (born 1965), British politician
- Dom Moraes (1938–2004), Indian writer and poet
- Drica Moraes (born 1969), Brazilian actress
- Ederson Moraes (born 1993), Brazilian footballer
- Francisco de Moraes (c. 1500 – 1572), Portuguese writer
- Frank Moraes (1907–1974), Indian newspaper editor
- Henrietta Moraes (1931–1999), British model and memoirist
- Isabela Moraes (born 1980), Brazilian synchronized swimmer
- Mestre Moraes (born 1950), Brazilian capoeira master
- Premnath Moraes (1923–1998), Sri Lankan Tamil actor, director, and screenwriter
- Vinicius de Moraes (1913–1980), Brazilian writer, composer, and diplomat
- Walter Moraes (1934–1997), Brazilian jurist

== Morais ==
- Bráulio Morais (born 1990), Angolan basketball player
- Carlos Morais (basketball) (born 1985), Angolan basketball player
- Carlos Pedro Silva Morais (born 1976), Cape Verdean footballer known as "Caló"
- Clodomir Santos de Morais (1928–2016), Brazilian sociologist
- Cristiane de Morais Smith Lehner, Brazilian theoretical physicist
- Daniel Morais Reis (born 1986), Brazilian footballer
- Danny Morais (born 1985), Brazilian footballer
- Davidson Morais (born 1981), Brazilian footballer
- Diego Morais Pacheco (born 1983), Brazilian footballer
- Edgar Morais (born 1989), Portuguese actor, writer and director
- Ellinton Antonio Costa Morais (born 1990), Brazilian footballer
- Felipe Morais (born 2008), Brazilian footballer
- Fernando Morais (born 1946), Brazilian writer and politician
- Filipe Morais (born 1985), Portuguese footballer
- Frederico Morais (born 1992), Portuguese surfer
- Hugo Morais (born 1978), Portuguese footballer
- Jean-Claude Bastos de Morais (born 1967), Swiss-Angolan entrepreneur
- João Baptista Mascarenhas de Morais (1883–1968), Brazilian Army officer
- João Morais (1935–2010), Portuguese footballer
- John Victor Morais (1910–1991), Malaysian writer and journalist
- José Morais (born 1965), Portuguese football coach
- Júnior Morais (born 1986), Brazilian-Romanian footballer
- Kevin Anthony Morais (1960–2015), Malaysian Deputy Public Prosecutor
- Lauren Morais (born 2001 or 2002), Welsh actress
- Luís Filipe Montenegro Cardoso de Morais Esteves, Portuguese politician
- Manoel Morais Amorim (born 1984), Brazilian footballer
- Marcos Evangelista de Morais (born 1970), Brazilian footballer known as "Cafu"
- Nélson Morais (born 1974), Portuguese footballer
- Nuno Morais (born 1984), Portuguese footballer
- Nuno Morais (athlete) (1923–1986), Portuguese sprinter
- Olinda Morais (born 1951), East Timorese politician
- Patrícia Morais (born 1992), Portuguese footballer
- Paulo de Morais (born 1963), Portuguese professor and politician
- Prudente de Morais (1841–1902), Brazilian president
- Ricardo Morais (born 1967), Brazilian mixed martial artist
- Richard C. Morais (born 1960), Canadian-American writer
- Sabato Morais (1823–1897), Italian-American rabbi
- Sanjeeva Morais, Sri Lankan judge of the Court of Appeal
- Stephan Morais (born 1973), English and Portuguese businessman
- Trevor Morais (born 1944), English drummer
- Ulisses Morais (born 1959), Portuguese footballer
- Umeshka Morais (born 1995), Sri Lankan cricketer
- Valdiram Caetano de Morais (1982–2019), Brazilian footballer
- Welington Morais (born 1996), Brazilian track and field athlete
- Wilder Morais (born 1968), Brazilian politician
- William Morais (1991–2011), Brazilian footballer

== Given name ==
- Morais Abreu (born 1968), Angolan beach volleyball player
- Morais Guy, Jamaican politician

== See also ==
- Morais (Macedo de Cavaleiros), a Portuguese parish in the municipality of Macedo de Cavaleiros (Bragança District)
- Morais ophiolite complex, a geologic formation in Portugal
- De Moraes (crater), a lunar impact crater
- Morales, a Spanish surname
