= Castle of Balsamão =

Castle in Macedo de Cavaleiros, Portugal

- Castelo de Balsamão
- Bragança, Alto Trás-os-Montes, Norte Region, Portugal in Portugal

Site information
- Type: Castle
- Owner: Portuguese Republic
- Operator: Roman Catholic Diocese of Bragança-Miranda
- Open to the public: Public

Location
- Coordinates: 41°28′24.3″N 6°51′24.4″W

Site history
- Built: 11th century
- Materials: Schist, Mortar

The Castle of Balsamão (Portuguese: Castelo de Balsamão) is a medieval castle in the civil parish of Chacim, municipality of Macedo de Cavaleiros, in the Portuguese district of Bragança.

== History ==
The first structure in this place consisted of an Iron Age fortified settlement, from which little remains.

The colony was eventually occupied by the Romans.

During the Middle Ages there was a small town on the site, probably preceded by the construction of a hermitage, attributed to the Order of Malta and over a mosque (or primitive chapel). Legend suggests that the mountaintop was occupied by Moors who forced on local Christians a heavy tax, including the Tributo das donzelas (Tribute of the Damsels). This tax consisted of an obligation to brides within their domains to stay in the castle with the Emir. One day, in the town of Castro, approximately 15 kilometres (9.3 mi) from Balsamão, after her wedding ceremony, a bride was abducted and taken to the castle. Her groom, son of the chief of the Cavaleiros das Esporas Douradas (Golden Spur Cavalry) from Alfândega, the inhabitants of Castro and surrounding lands, followed them to the mountaintop to challenge the Saracens to combat to liberate the bride. The Moorish soldiers escaped and the Christians purified their mosque, transforming it into a chapel dedicated to Our Lady of Bálsamo, which later evolved to Balsamão. The place where the Moors lost the battle was renamed Chacim (a plural past tense variant of slaughter), the villa of Castro became Castro Vicente, and Alfândega was changed due to the peoples act of faith (Portuguese: fé) to Alfândega da Fé.

In 1212, the first historic reference to Monte Carrascal, during the reign of King D. Afonso II a castle already existed on the site.

But, by the 17th century, the settlement was completely abandoned. On 18 July 1731, a deed for the sale of "a piece of ground with a fig tree, located on the estate of the Olgas, in the courtyard of the town within the curtain of Placido Rodrigues, in the locality of Olmos", between António de São José (bearded hermit and "president and assistant at the chapel of Nossa Senhora de Balsamão") and Pedro de Mesquita and his wife for 14$400.

On 2 March 1732, the lands of Monte do Caramouro were donated to the municipality of Chacim by the congregation of the Barbadinhos. In the donation letter they referred to Moors living on the hilltop and a mountain "with Impregnable fortress that still conserved its Walls".

The shelter at Balsamão was consecrated on 12 April 1746, construction alongside the primitive hermitage, by the abbey of Vinhas, Father Roque de Sousa Pimentel. During the construction of the convent, the workers discovered Roman coins and bones.

On 28 February 1758, Gaspar da Rocha Ferreira wrote in the Memórias Paroquiais of the parish, referring to a sanctuary with its seven chapels. In addition, legend holds, that by tradition they offered its poor residents on every Monday after Easter, a cow or bull, which they determined by election. The fortification at the time had some walls. When they performed public works in the local, workers found a necropolis with graves carved with inscriptions.

With the extinction of the religious orders, in 1834, part of the courtyard was auctioned to the public and the castle passed into the hands of private property holders.

The property owner in 1954, Dr. António Meneses Cordeiro and his daughter, Maria Leopoldina, and her husband, Dr. Acácio Vítor Ferreira, ceded the property to the Congregação de Padres Marianos da Imaculada Conceição (Congregational Marian Priests of the Immaculate Conception), who began to administer the locale. By that time, the castle included the base of the towers, and various walls.

== Architecture ==
The castle remains are located in a rural, isolated position, 4 kilometres (2.5 mi) from the seat of the parish, almost at the top of Mount Balsamão, formerly Monte Carrascal, at 522 metres (1,713 ft) above sea level. It was constructed partly over a rocky surface, adapted to the flanks of the terrain and restricted by the roadway. The interior of the high fortification walls, is covered in pine and vegetation. At the top of the mountain is the Convent of Balsamão and along the flanks, the eight chapels of the Passos da Paixão de Cristo (Way of the Passion of Christ) that comprise the sanctuary and, immediately near the wall, the Capela dos Cajados (Chapel of Cajados) and cemetery. The hilltop is supported by the Azibo River, to the south (a tributary of Sabor), crossed by the Ponte de Paradinha, and in the north, the Ribeira de Veiga.

The medieval fortification, was constructed at the top of a mountain, and includes a subsystem of curvilinear walls constructed of masonry stone and integrated with rectangular corbels. The castle was occupied since the Iron Age, with excellent natural defensive conditions, but the only remains on the site are the convent and seminary, that date from the 18th and 20th century.

The walls and western corbel resulted from restoration work completed in the 20th century. Located in the south flank, is the incomplete curvilinear wall of the castle with parapets was constructed in mixed masonry stone, while smooth stones are used to surface the parapets in the south. The interior does not include battlements, but may be crossed due to the unlevel surface of the terrain. In the west is a rectangular corbel facing the exterior, that is relatively complete with terrace and simple crellations, accessible from a stone staircase addorsed to the interior wall. In the western limits the wall is interrupted and there are no visible indications of how the wall continued. At the more elevated position, in the northeast, near the potable reservoir of the sanctuary, are other remains of the walls.

Much of the landscape of Monte Balsamão is arranged with small gardens, various chapels, agricultural buildings, residences and other structures, including vestiges of ceramics. In the south, is a convent complex, where the discovered fragments of ceramics dating to the Iron Age.
