= Jana Rybářová =

Jana Rybářová may refer to:

- Jana Rybářová (synchronized swimmer) (born 1978), Czech synchronized swimmer
- Jana Rybářová (actress) (1936–1957), Czech film and stage actress
