= Galina Shatnaya =

Kazakhstani synchronized swimmer

Personal information
- Nationality: Kazakhstan
- Born: 28 March 1975 (age 51) Alma-Ata, Kazakh SSR, Soviet Union
- Height: 175 cm (5 ft 9 in)
- Weight: 50 kg (110 lb)

Sport
- Sport: Swimming
- Strokes: Synchronized swimming

Galina Shatnaya (Галина Владимировна Шатная (Резванцева) born 28 March 1975) is a Kazakhstani synchronized swimmer. She competed in the women's duet at the 2000 Olympic Games.
