= Azibo River =

Coordinates: 41.4053°N 6.8022°W

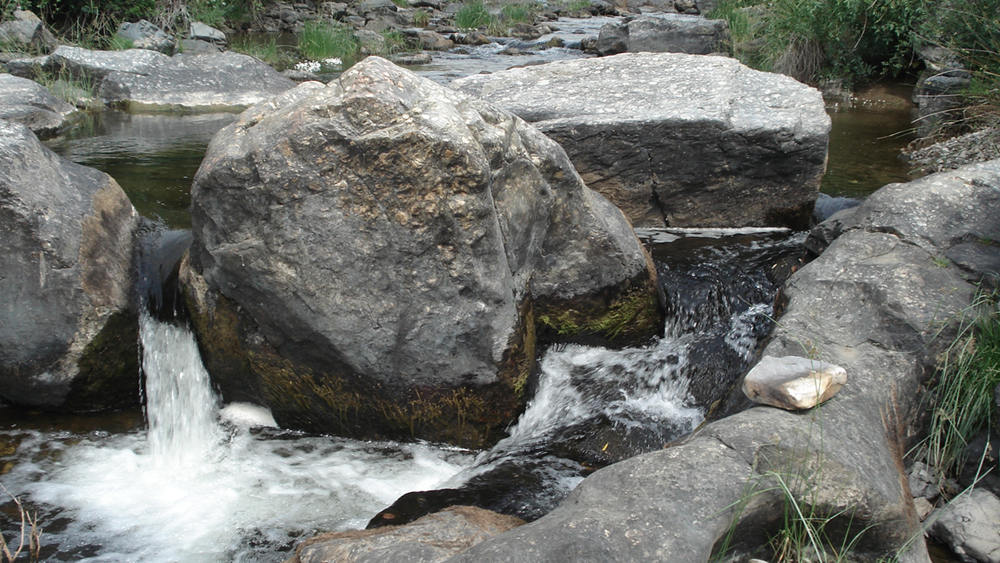

Location
- Country: Portugal

Physical characteristics
- Source
  - location: Rebordainhos, Bragança District, Trás-os-Montes, Portugal
- Mouth
  - location: Sabor River, Bragança District, Trás-os-Montes, Portugal
- Length: 50 km (31 mi)

The Azibo River (Portuguese pronunciation: [ɐˈziβu]) is a Portuguese river in the Douro River basin. It has its source in the Nogueira mountains, near the place of Rebordainhos, Bragança Municipality, in the northeast of Portugal. Along its 50 kilometres (31 mi) of length, it crosses the Macedo de Cavaleiros Municipality, where in 1982 an earthfill dam was built near Santa Combinha place (Azibo Reservoir). The Azibo river has its mouth near the place of Lagoa (Macedo de Cavaleiros Municipality), on the right bank of the Sabor River, which is a tributary of Douro River.

== See also ==
- Geography of Europe
- List of European rivers with alternative names
- Latin names of European rivers
- European river zonation
- pt:Anexo:Lista de rios de Portugal
- pt:Lista de ribeiras de Portugal
- Azibo Reservoir Protected Landscape
- Macedo de Cavaleiros Municipality
- List of Birds of Azibo Reservoir Protected Landscape
