= Alto Trás-os-Montes =

Coordinates: 41°35′N 7°10′W

- NUTS III Subregion
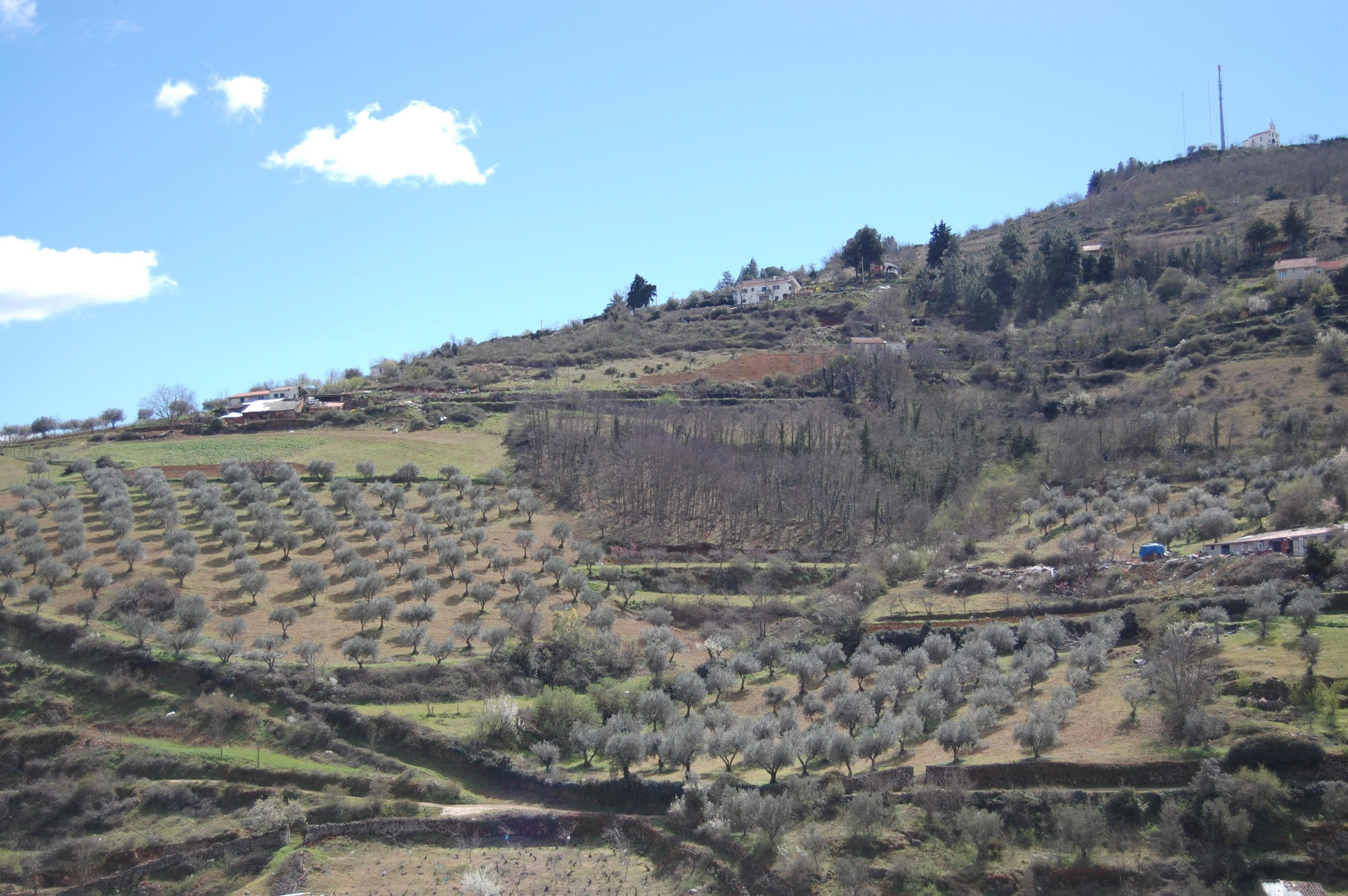
- The olive trees in the municipality of Bragança
- Etymology: alto trás-os-montes, Portuguese for high behind-the-mountains
- Location of the Alto Trás-os-Montes subregion in continental Portugal
- Country: Portugal
- Region: Norte
- Abolished: 2015
- Municipalities: Alfândega da Fé, Boticas, Bragança, Chaves, Macedo de Cavaleiros, Miranda do Douro, Mirandela, Mogadouro, Montalegre, Murça, Valpaços, Vila Pouca de Aguiar, Vimioso, Vinhais

Area
  - Total: 8,171.62 km^{2} (3,155.08 sq mi)

Population (2008)
  - Total: 214,460
  - Density: 26.244/km^{2} (67.973/sq mi)
- Time zone: UTC0 (WET)
  - Summer (DST): UTC+1 (WEST)
- Area code: +351
- ccTLD: .pt
- Demonym: Transmontanan
- Currency: Euro (€)
- Statistics from INE (2001); geographic detail from Instituto Geográfico Português (2010)

Alto Trás-os-Montes (Portuguese pronunciation: [ˈaltu ˌtɾaz uʒ ˈmõtɨʃ]), or Nordeste Transmontano, is a former NUTS-level 3 subregion of the Norte Region of Portugal. It was abolished at the January 2015 NUTS 3 revision. Its 15 municipalities occupied an area of 8,168 km^{2} (3,154 sq mi) in the north-east of continental Portugal with an estimated 2008 population of 214,460 inhabitants; thus it constituted approximately 40% of the area, but only 6.1% of the population, of the Norte Region.

== Geography ==
The Trás-os-Montes area refers to a contiguous territory that has similar social and cultural identities, but diverges on the potential economic abilities, while constituting a territorial unit with scale and critical mass to act in concert politically. In addition to its land border with Spain (in the north and north-northeast), it is also juxtapositioned with the subregions of the Douro (to the south), Tâmega Subregion (in the southwest), Ave (in the southwest) and Cávado (in the west). The NUTS III region of Alto Trás-os-Montes includes the following municipalities:

- Alfândega da Fé - a Moorish enclave, it was conquered by Asturian Christians and its original name, Alfandagh (which means hospice), was extended with Fe (meaning faith). The beginnings of its municipal history date back to a foral established on 8 May 1294, by King Denis of Portugal;
- Boticas - its history dates back to the Guedeões-Barroso line of hereditary clans (the Barrosos, were the predominant line, fixing themselves in Braga and Barcelos) becoming signeurs and administrators of the lands of the Trás-os-Montes until the lands were donated. The municipality was established during the Liberal regime (6 November 1836 decree) from portions of Chaves and Montalegre;
- Bragança - home to the hereditary line of the House of Braganza, established in 1442 by King Afonso, responsible for providing Portugal its kings (from 1640 to 1910) and the emperors (from 1822 to 1889): at the end of the Iberian Union with Spain, after the 1 December 1640, that the ascension of the 8th Duke of Braganza (then military governor of Portugal), John IV to the title of King that restored the Portuguese monarchy;
- Chaves – founded during the reign of the Flavian Emperor Vespasian, Aquae Flaviae, was renowned during this period for its thermal springs and baths. During the Middle Ages it was traded back and forth between Spanish and Portuguese monarchs, as well as the seat of Monarchy of the North, during the failed monarchist revolts of the 20th century;
- Macedo de Cavaleiros – named in honour of Martim Gonçalves de Macedo, who saved John, the Master of Aviz during the Battle of Aljubarrota, the municipality is best known for the Paisagem Protegida da Albufeira do Azibo a reservoir constructed during the 1980s to support the communities, but used for both recreational and leisure activities.
- Miranda do Douro
- Mirandela
- Mogadouro
- Montalegre
- Murça
- Valpaços
- Vila Pouca de Aguiar
- Vimioso
- Vinhais

The inhabitants are not homogeneously distributed within the region: with most of the population concentrated in the principal urban agglomerations, the region has experienced a continuous process of rural-to-urban population migration to centres within or outside the region. Yet, simultaneously, the medium-to-small centres have taken on a catalytic role in urbanization and economic development.

The structure of the Trás-os-Montes hierarchy is highlighted by the largest of these "medium"-sized cities (Bragança, Mirandela and Chaves), corresponding to the principal urban poles, and articulated by a complementary urban network, constituted by the seats of the municipalities of Alfândega da Fé, Boticas, Macedo de Cavaleiros, Miranda do Douro, Mogadouro, Montalegre, Ribeira de Pena, Valpaços, Vila Flor, Vila Pouca de Aguiar, Vimioso and Vinhais.

The proximity of Trás-os-Montes with Spain has allowed a cross-cultural and cross-social partnership, that has helped to develop both social and economic projects.

== Economy ==
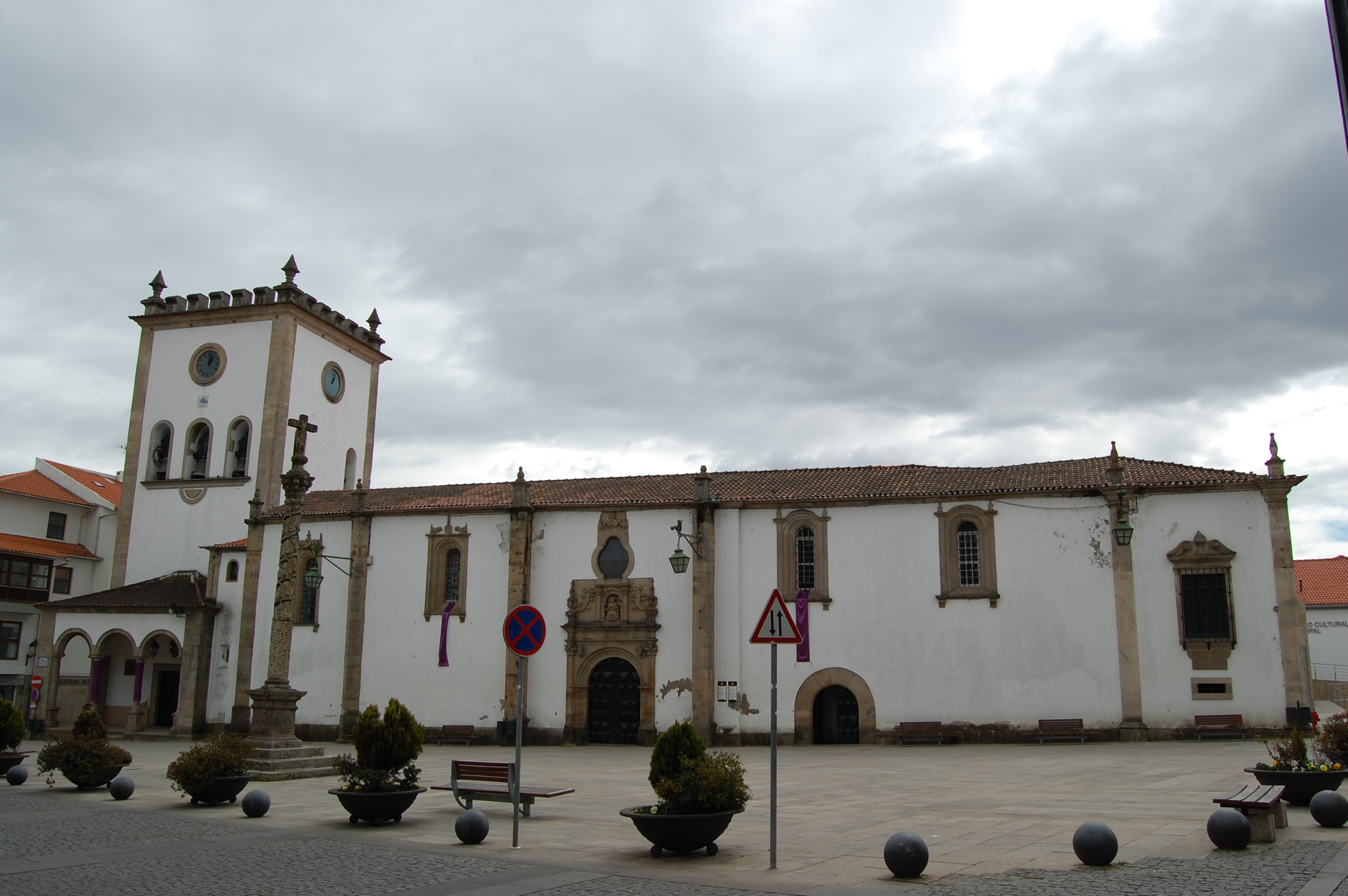
The Sé in Bragança, ancient medieval cathedral in the Trás-os-Montes

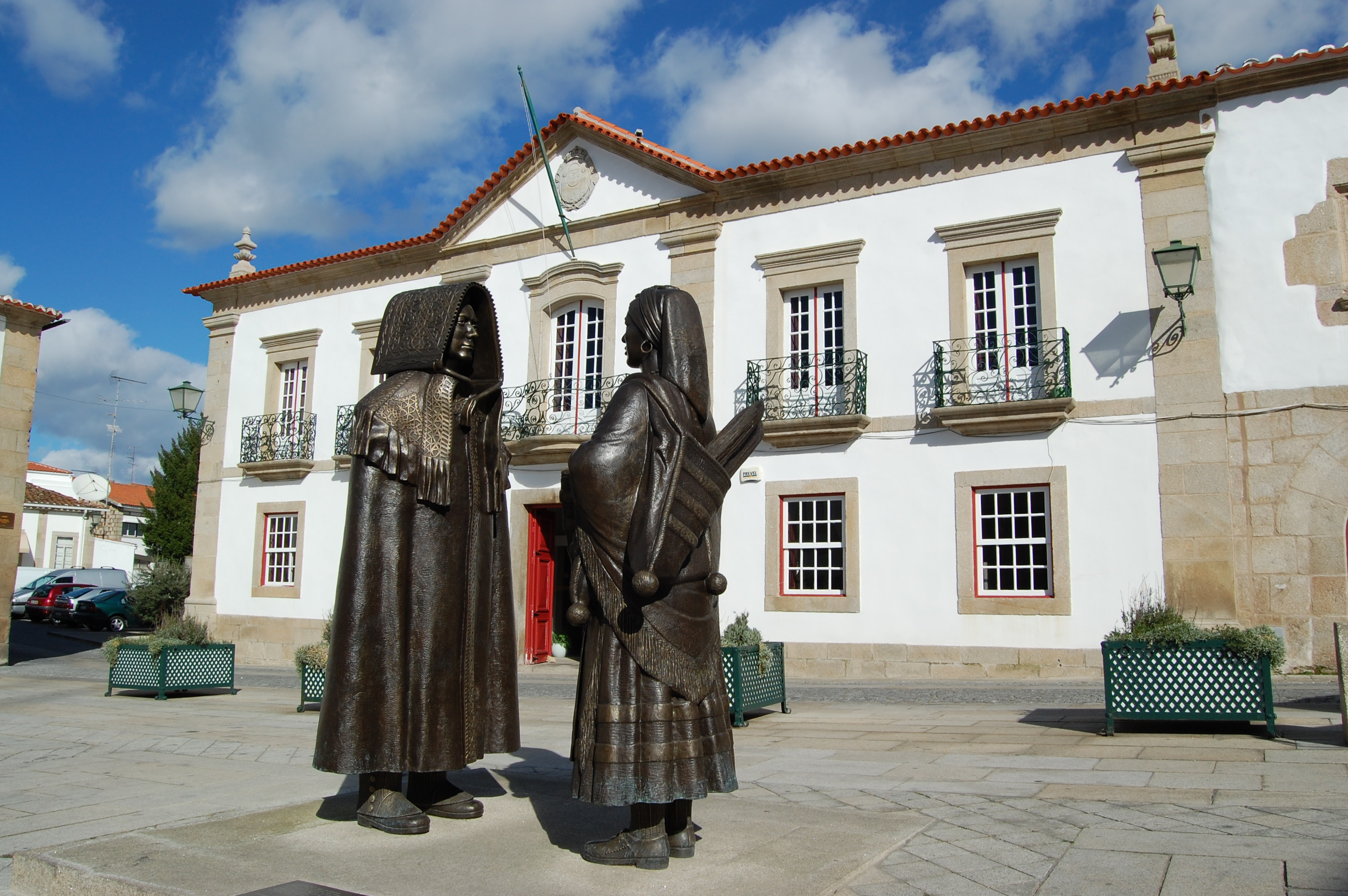
The main square in the municipality of Miranda do Douro

Institutionally, the municipalities of the Trás-os-Montes are aggregated into three associations that plan and promote regional development tasks within the region: Associação de Municípios da Terra Fria do Nordeste Transmontano (which include Bragança, Miranda do Douro, Mogadouro, Vimioso and Vinhais), the Associação de Municípios da Terra Quente Transmontana (with Alfândega da Fé, Macedo de Cavaleiros, Mirandela and Vila Flor) and Associação de Municípios do Alto Tâmega (Boticas, Chaves, Montalegre, Ribeira de Pena, Valpaços and Vila Pouca de Aguiar). The municipality of Mogadouro falls within the Associação de Municípios do Douro Superior. The AMTF-NT assumes the largest part of regional development funding and organizational motivation.

The agro-forestry activities in the region are transitioning to socially or economically viable commerce sectors, with the emigration of more residents into the urban areas. Agriculture, with its base in the production of olive oil, the raising of cattle, and cultivation of fruit orchards, remains the primary source of income in this region.
