= Olesya Zaytseva =

Ukrainian synchronized swimmer

Personal information
- Full name: Зайцева Олеся Володимирівна
- Nationality: Ukraine
- Born: 8 November 1974 (age 51)
- Height: 1.82 m (6 ft 0 in)
- Weight: 50 kg (110 lb)

Sport
- Sport: Swimming
- Strokes: Synchronized swimming
- Updated on 19 April 2024

Olesya Zaytseva (born 8 November 1974) is a Ukrainian retired synchronized swimmer who competed in the women's duet at the 2000 Summer Olympics. Together with her partner Iryna Rudnytska, she marked the debut for Ukraine at the Olympics in the sport of synchronized swimming. They finished 14th. She also represented Ukraine at the 1998 World Aquatics Championships.

After the retirement, Zaytseva has been working as senior coach of Ukraine national team and teaching at Kharkiv Professional College of Sports.
