= Morais Natura 2000 Site =

Site of high geological, botanical and zoological interest

- Location within Portugal
- Location: Macedo de Cavaleiros, Bragança District, Portugal
- Coordinates: 41.505°N 6.818°W
- Area: 128,780 km^{2} (49,720 sq mi)

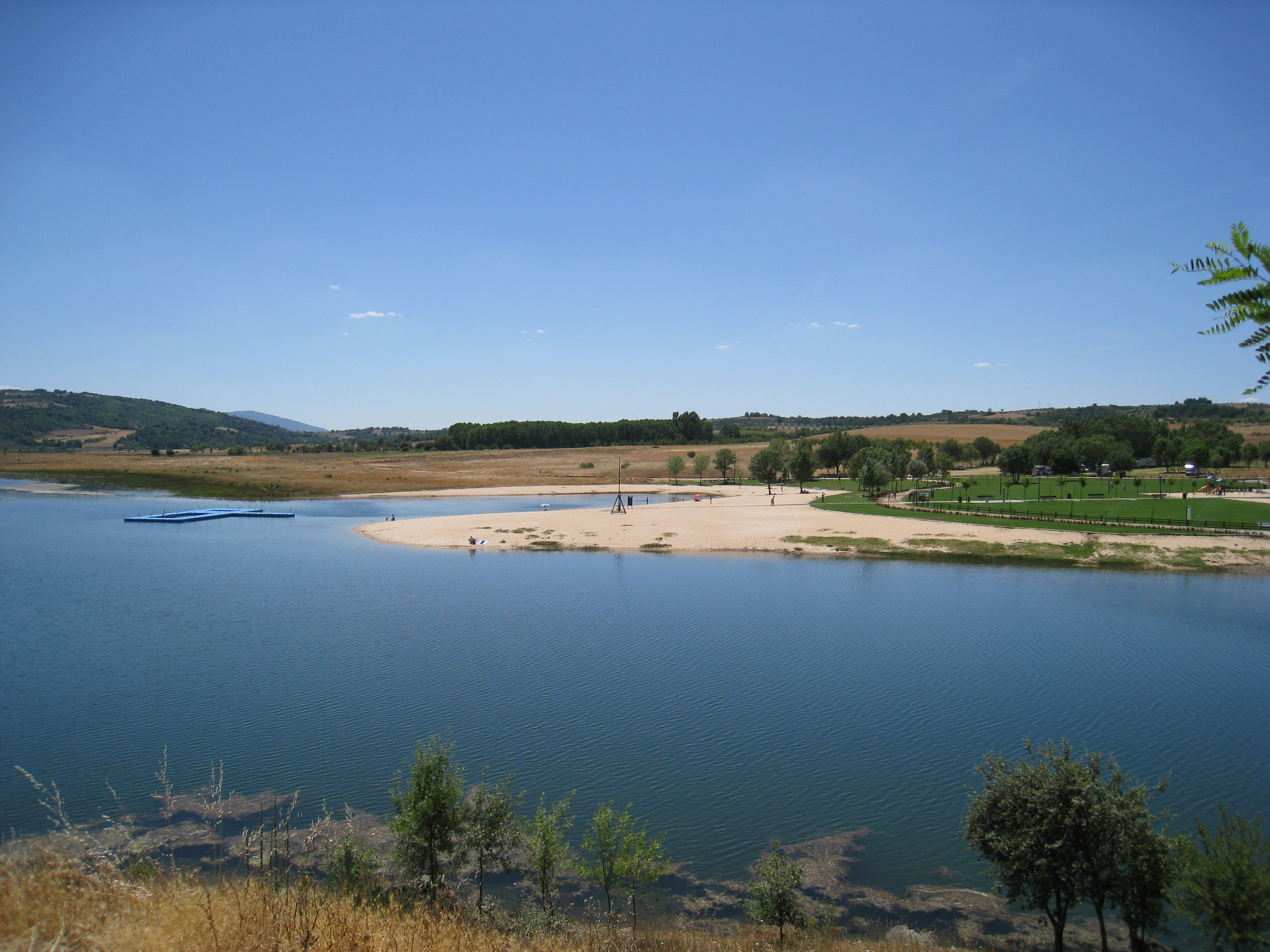
Azibo Reservoir

The Morais Natura 2000 Site (PTCON0023) is located in the northeast of Portugal. With an area of 12878 (ha) almost entirely in the municipality of Macedo de Cavaleiros (12219 ha), partially integrates the Azibo Reservoir Protected Landscape, extending itself thru the neighboring municipalities of Bragança (546 ha) and Mogadouro (114 ha).

This average altitude mountainous area, has in its core the Morais Ophiolite Complex, one of the most representative areas of ultramafic rocks, and the largest continuous units of serpentinite in Portugal. Covered with several endemic species and communities, the site has high geological, botanical and zoological interest.

== See also ==
- Morais ophiolite complex – Metamorphic complex of oceanic and continental crust terranes in Portugal
- Azibo Reservoir Protected Landscape
- Macedo de Cavaleiros Municipality
- Morais (Macedo de Cavaleiros) – Portuguese parish in the municipality of Macedo de Cavaleiros
- List of birds of Azibo Reservoir Protected Landscape
