= Podence (Macedo de Cavaleiros) =

- Civil parish
- Location in Portugal
- Coordinates: 41.592°N 6.926°W
- Country: Portugal
- Region: Norte
- Intermunic. comm.: Terras de Trás-os-Montes
- District: Bragança
- Municipality: Macedo de Cavaleiros

Area
  - Total: 14.44 km^{2} (5.58 sq mi)

Population (2011)
  - Total: 250
  - Density: 17/km^{2} (45/sq mi)
- Time zone: UTC+00:00 (WET)
  - Summer (DST): UTC+01:00 (WEST)

Podence is a former civil parish in the municipality (concelho) of Macedo de Cavaleiros, Portugal. In 2013, the parish merged into the new parish Podence e Santa Combinha. The population in 2011 was 250, in an area of 14.44 km^{2}.

Podence is internationally known for its tradition of Careto or Caretos, during the festivities of Carnival when gangs of masked youths terrorize young girls and rob the cellars of the village.

== See also ==
- Azibo Reservoir Protected Landscape
