= Iryna Rudnytska =

Ukrainian synchronized swimmer

Personal information
- Nationality: Ukraine
- Born: 21 April 1979 (age 47)
- Height: 1.75 m (5 ft 9 in)
- Weight: 58 kg (128 lb)

Sport
- Sport: Swimming
- Strokes: Synchronized swimming
- Updated on 19 April 2024

Iryna Rudnytska (born 21 April 1979) is a Ukrainian retired synchronized swimmer who competed in the women's duet at the 2000 Summer Olympics. Together with her partner Olesya Zaytseva, she marked the debut for Ukraine at the Olympics in the sport of synchronized swimming. They finished 14th. She also represented Ukraine at the 1998 and 2001 World Aquatics Championships.

Rudnytska studied at Piddubny Olympic College and later graduated from National University of Ukraine on Physical Education and Sport where she completed master's course in recreation and sports clubs management. After the retirement, she has been working as an aqua instructor in Kyiv.
