= Despoina Theodoridou =

Greek synchronized swimmer (born 1978)

Personal information
- Nationality: Greece
- Born: 25 May 1978 (age 48) Serres, Greece
- Height: 1.75 m (5 ft 9 in)
- Weight: 60 kg (130 lb)

Sport
- Sport: Swimming
- Strokes: Synchronized swimming
- Club: Nireas Chalandriou
- Updated on 23 May 2015

Despoina Theodoridou (born 25 May 1978) is a Greek former synchronized swimmer.

Despoina competed in the women's duet at the 2000 Summer Olympics with Christina Thalassinidou and finished in thirteenth place.
