= List of birds of Azibo Reservoir Protected Landscape =

This is a list of some of the bird species recorded at the Azibo Reservoir Protected Landscape in Portugal. Birds are listed by their biological order.

Azibo Reservoir Protected Landscape plays an important role in the region because of its location and ecological characteristics. It is a residential and breeding habitat for many bird species, and is also a temporary habitat for migratory species in transit.

== Podiciformes ==
Common name	Binomial	Status
Great crested grebe	Podiceps cristatus	A resident breeder
Little grebe	Tachybaptus ruficollis	A resident breeder
Black-necked grebe	Podiceps nigricollis	A rare resident breeder

== Pelecaniformes ==
Common name	Binomial	Status
Great cormorant	Phalacrocorax carbo	A winter visitor

== Ciconiiformes ==
Common name	Binomial	Status
Grey heron	Ardea cinerea	A common vagrant
Little egret	Egretta garzetta	A common vagrant
Cattle egret	Bubulcus ibis	A common vagrant
Little bittern	Ixobrychus minutus	A rare vagrant
Purple heron	Ardea purpurea	A rare vagrant
White stork	Ciconia ciconia	A resident breeder
Black stork	Ciconia nigra	A rare visitor
Eurasian spoonbill	Platalea leucorodia	A passage migrant

== Anseriformes ==
Common name	Binomial	Status
Mallard	Anas platyrhynchos	A resident breeder and winter visitor
Common pochard	Aythya ferina	A common visitor
Wigeon	Anas penelope	A rare vagrant
Gadwall	Anas strepera	A rare vagrant
Eurasian teal	Anas crecca	A common visitor
Northern shoveler	Anas clypeata	A rare visitor

== Accipitriformes ==
Common name	Binomial	Status
Black kite	Milvus migrans	A migrant breeder
Red kite	Milvus milvus	A common visitor
Montagu's harrier	Circus pygargus	A migrant breeder
Hen harrier	Circus cyaneus	A common visitor
Northern goshawk	Accipiter gentilis	A resident breeding species
Eurasian sparrowhawk	Accipiter nisus	A resident breeding species
Common buzzard	Buteo buteo	A resident breeding species
Golden eagle	Aquila chrysaetos	A rare vagrant
Booted eagle	Hieraaetus pennatus	A summer visitor
Short-toed eagle	Circaetus gallicus	A summer visitor
Osprey	Pandion haliaetus	A rare vagrant
Common kestrel	Falco tinnunculus	A common vagrant
Merlin	Falco columbarius	A winter visitor
Eurasian hobby	Falco subbuteo	A migrant breeder
Peregrine falcon	Falco peregrinus	A rare vagrant
Griffon vulture	Gyps fulvus	A summer common visitor
Egyptian vulture	Neophron percnopterus	A summer common visitor

== Galliformes ==
Common name	Binomial	Status
Red-legged partridge	Alectoris rufa	A resident breeder
Common quail	Coturnix coturnix	A resident breeder

== Gruiformes ==
Common name	Binomial	Status
Eurasian coot	Fulica atra	A resident breeder
Common moorhen	Gallinula chloropus	A resident breeder
Water rail	Rallus aquaticus	A resident breeder

== Charadriiformes ==
.

Common name	Binomial	Status
Eurasian oystercatcher	Haematopus ostralegus	A passage migrant
Pied avocet	Recurvirostra avosetta	A passage migrant
Black-winged stilt	Himantopus himantopus	A passage migrant
Little ringed plover	Charadrius dubius	A common vagrant
Ringed plover	Charadrius hiaticula	A common vagrant
European golden plover	Pluvialis apricaria	A rare vagrant
Northern lapwing	Vanellus vanellus	A rare vagrant
Dunlin	Calidris alpina	A common vagrant and passage migrant
Common snipe	Gallinago gallinago	A common vagrant and passage migrant
Common greenshank	Tringa nebularia	A common vagrant
Redshank	Tringa totanus	A common vagrant
Whimbrel	Numenius phaeopus	A rare vagrant
Black-tailed godwit	Limosa limosa	A passage migrant
Bar-tailed godwit	Limosa lapponica	A passage migrant
Common sandpiper	Actitis hypoleucos	A resident breeder
Ruddy turnstone	Arenaria interpres	A rare vagrant
Black tern	Chlidonias niger	A common vagrant
Black-headed gull	Larus ridibundus	A common vagrant

== Columbiformes ==
Common name	Binomial	Status
Rock dove	Columba livia	A resident breeder
Stock dove	Columba oenas	A resident breeder
Common wood pigeon	Columba palumbus	A resident breeder
Collared dove	Streptopelia decaocto	A resident breeder
European turtle dove	Streptopelia turtur	A migrant breeder

== Cuculiformes ==
Common name	Binomial	Status
Common cuckoo	Cuculus canorus	A migrant breeder
Great spotted cuckoo	Clamator glandarius	A rare migrant breeder

== Strigiformes ==
Common name	Binomial	Status
Little owl	Athene noctua	A resident breeder
Barn owl	Tyto alba	A resident breeder
Tawny owl	Strix aluco	A resident breeder
Long-eared owl	Asio otus	A resident breeder
Eurasian scops owl	Otus scops	A migrant breeder
Eurasian eagle-owl	Bubo bubo	A rare resident breeder

== Caprimilgiformes ==
Common name	Binomial	Status
European nightjar	Caprimulgus europaeus	A migrant breeder

== Apodiformes ==
Common name	Binomial	Status
Common swift	Apus apus	A migrant breeder

== Coraciiformes ==
Common name	Binomial	Status
Common kingfisher	Alcedo atthis	A resident breeder
Hoopoe	Upupa epops	A migrant breeder
European bee-eater	Merops apiaster	A migrant breeder
European roller	Coracias garrulus	A rare vagrant

== Piciformes ==
Common name	Binomial	Status
Wryneck	Jynx torquilla	A migrant breeder
European green woodpecker	Picus viridis	A rare resident breeder
Great spotted woodpecker	Dendrocopos major	A resident breeder
Lesser spotted woodpecker	Dendrocopos minor	A resident breeder

== Passeriformes ==
Common name	Binomial	Status
Skylark	Alauda arvensis	A resident breeder
Calandra lark	Melanocorypha calandra	A resident breeder
Greater short-toed lark	Calandrella brachydactyla	A migrant breeder
Crested lark	Galerida cristata	A resident breeder
Thekla lark	Galerida theklae	A resident breeder
Woodlark	Lullula arborea	A resident breeder
Eurasian crag martin	Ptyonoprogne rupestris	A resident breeder
Sand martin	Riparia riparia	A migrant breeder
Barn swallow	Hirundo rustica	A migrant breeder
Red-rumped swallow	Hirundo daurica	A migrant breeder
Common house martin	Delichon urbica	A migrant breeder
Tawny pipit	Anthus campestris	A migrant breeder
Tree pipit	Anthus trivialis	A passage migrant
Meadow pipit	Anthus pratensis	A winter visitor
Water pipit	Anthus spinoletta	A migrant breeder
White wagtail	Motacilla alba	A resident breeder
Yellow wagtail	Motacilla flava	A migrant breeder
Grey wagtail	Motacilla cinerea	A resident breeder
Eurasian wren	Troglodytes troglodytes	A resident breeder
White-throated dipper	Cinclus cinclus	A resident breeder
Dunnock	Prunella modularis	A resident breeder
European robin	Erithacus rubecula	A resident breeder
Nightingale	Luscinia megarhynchos	A migrant breeder
Black redstart	Phoenicurus ochruros	A resident breeder
Whinchat	Saxicola rubetra	A passage migrant
African stonechat	Saxicola torquatus	A resident breeder
Blue rock thrush	Monticola solitarius	A rare resident breeder
Northern wheatear	Oenanthe oenanthe	A migrant breeder
Common blackbird	Turdus merula	A resident breeder
Song thrush	Turdus philomelos	A winter visitor
Mistle thrush	Turdus viscivorus	A resident breeder
Blackcap	Sylvia atricapilla	A resident breeder
Sardinian warbler	Sylvia melanocephala	A resident breeder
Common firecrest	Regulus ignicapilla	A resident breeder
Pied flycatcher	Ficedula hypoleuca	A migrant breeder
Great tit	Parus major	A resident breeder
Blue tit	Haliaeetus albicilla	A resident breeder
Crested tit	Lophophanes cristatus	A resident breeder
Long-tailed tit	Aegithalos caudatus	A resident breeder
Eurasian nuthatch	Sitta europaea	A resident breeder
Short-toed treecreeper	Certhia brachydactyla	A resident breeder
Woodchat shrike	Lanius senator	A migrant breeder
Great grey shrike	Lanius excubitor	A resident breeder
Red-backed shrike	Lanius collurio	A migrant breeder
Eurasian jay	Garrulus glandarius	A resident breeder
Red-billed chough	Pyrrhocorax pyrrhocorax	A rare resident breeder
Hooded crow	Corvus corone cornix	A winter visitor
Common raven	Corvus corax	A resident breeder
Common starling	Sturnus vulgaris	A winter visitor
Spotless starling	Sturnus unicolor	A resident breeder
Eurasian golden oriole	Oriolus oriolus	A migrant breeder
House sparrow	Passer domesticus	A resident breeder
Spanish sparrow	Passer hispaniolensis	A resident breeder
Eurasian tree sparrow	Passer montanus	A resident breeder
Rock sparrow	Petronia petronia	A resident breeder
Chaffinch	Fringilla coelebs	A resident breeder
Linnet	Carduelis cannabina	A resident breeder
European goldfinch	Carduelis carduelis	A resident breeder
European greenfinch	Carduelis chloris	A resident breeder
Eurasian siskin	Carduelis spinus	A winter visitor
European serin	Serinus serinus	A resident breeder
Eurasian bullfinch	Pyrrhula pyrrhula	A rare vagrant
Cirl bunting	Emberiza cirlus	A resident breeder
Corn bunting	Miliaria calandra	A resident breeder
Rock bunting	Emberiza cia	A resident breeder

== See also ==
- Azibo Reservoir Protected Landscape
- Azibo River
- List of birds of Portugal
- European birds
- Ornithology
- Birdwatching
- Macedo de Cavaleiros Municipality
