= Belinda Schmid =

Swiss synchronized swimmer

Personal information
- Born: 31 January 1981 (age 45) Zürich, Switzerland

Sport
- Sport: Synchronised swimming

Belinda Schmid (born 31 January 1981) is a Swiss former synchronized swimmer who competed in the 2000 and 2004 Summer Olympics.
