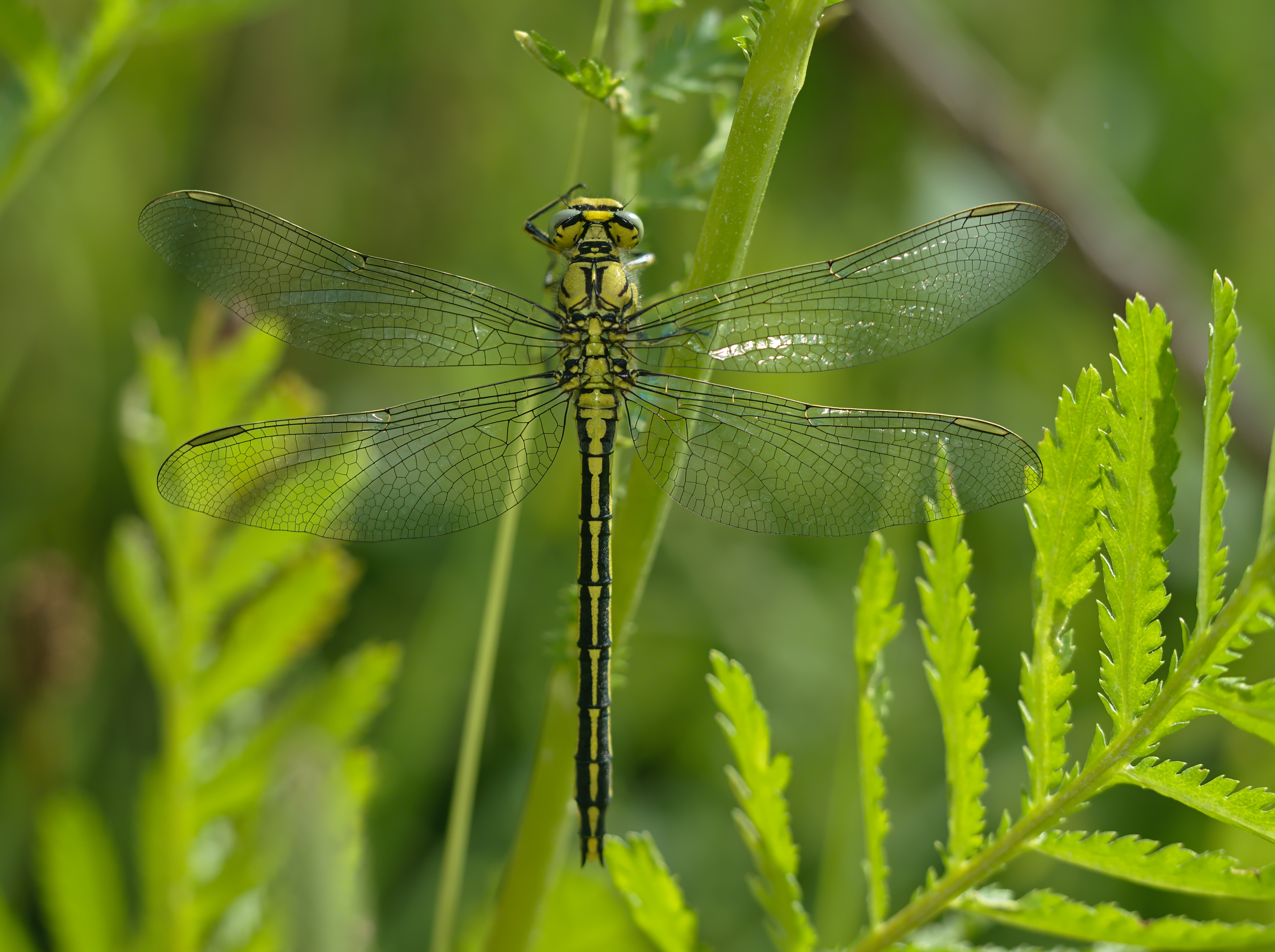

Conservation status
- Near Threatened (IUCN 3.1)

Scientific classification
- Kingdom: Animalia
- Phylum: Arthropoda
- Class: Insecta
- Order: Odonata
- Infraorder: Anisoptera
- Family: Gomphidae
- Genus: Gomphus
- Species: G. pulchellus

Binomial name
- Gomphus pulchellus Sélys, 1840

= Gomphus pulchellus =

Species of dragonfly

Gomphus pulchellus, the western clubtail, is a species of dragonfly in the family Gomphidae. It is found in Western Europe, although absent in the British isles. Its natural habitat are clean ponds and canals, clay and mud holes.

The species is 47–50 mm long. It is the only Gomphidae that lacks the "club-shaped" abdomen, in spite of its name. As an adult, it is mainly pale olive-green with blue eyes.

It emerges early in spring, can be seen as soon as the end of March in the South of France and flies until August depending on the location.

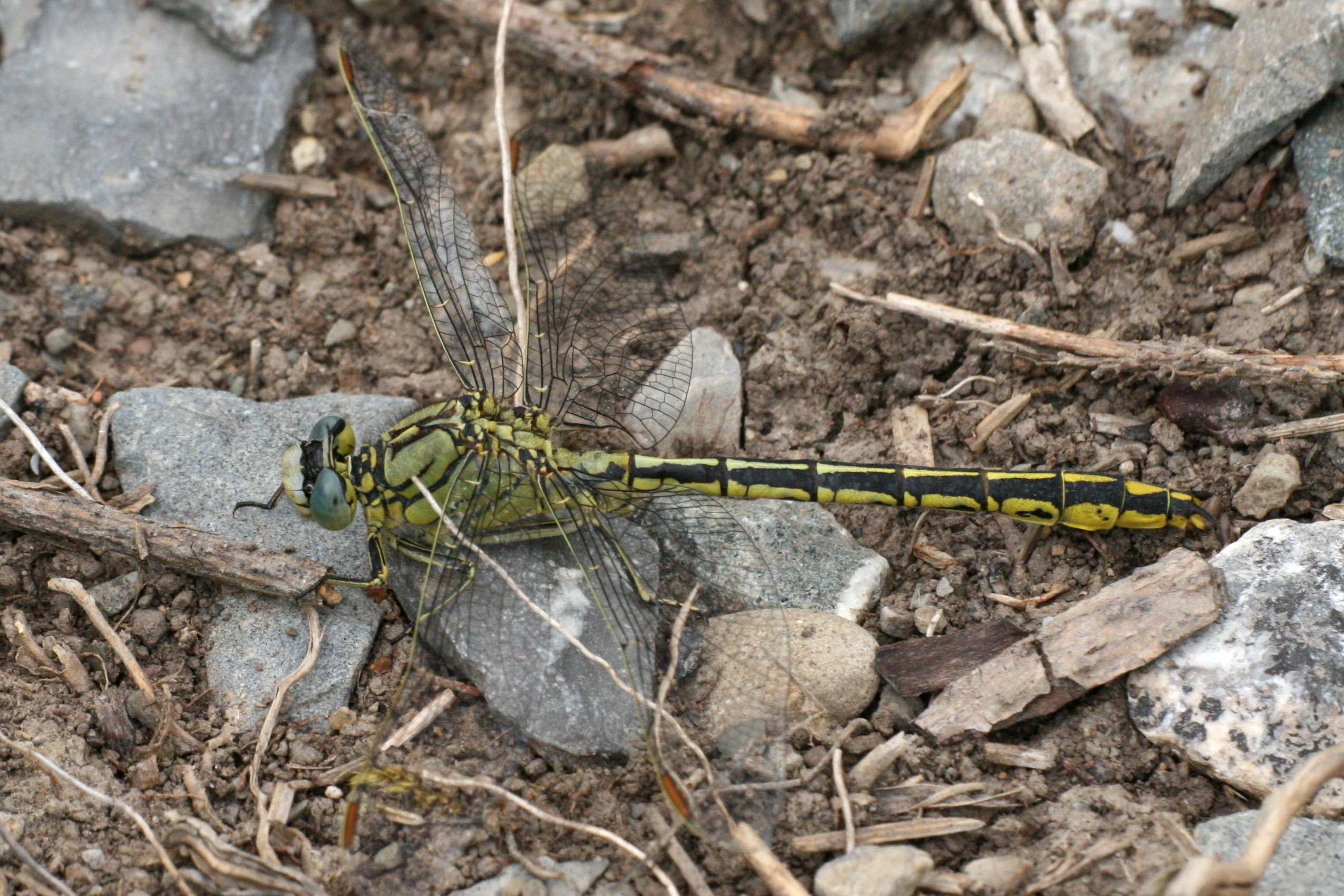
Male

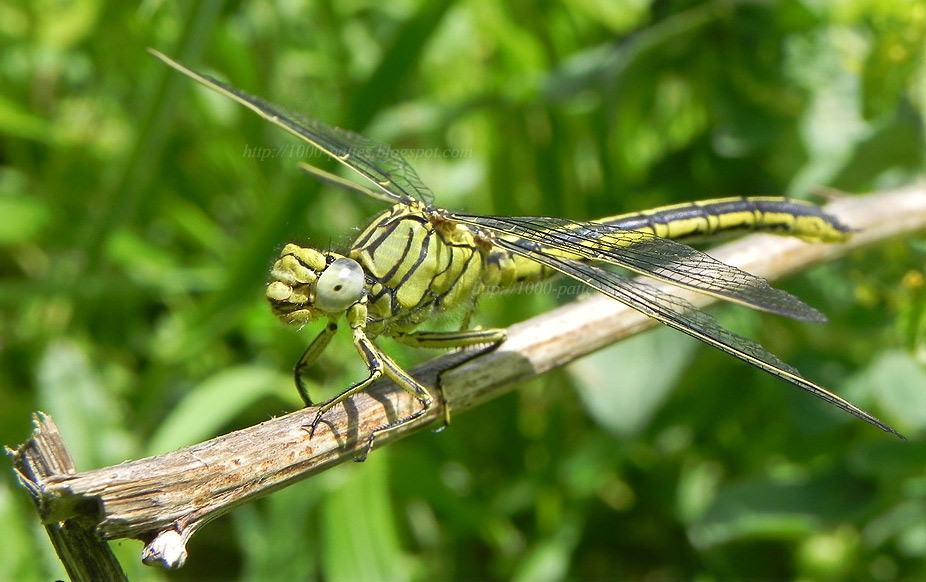
Female, South of France

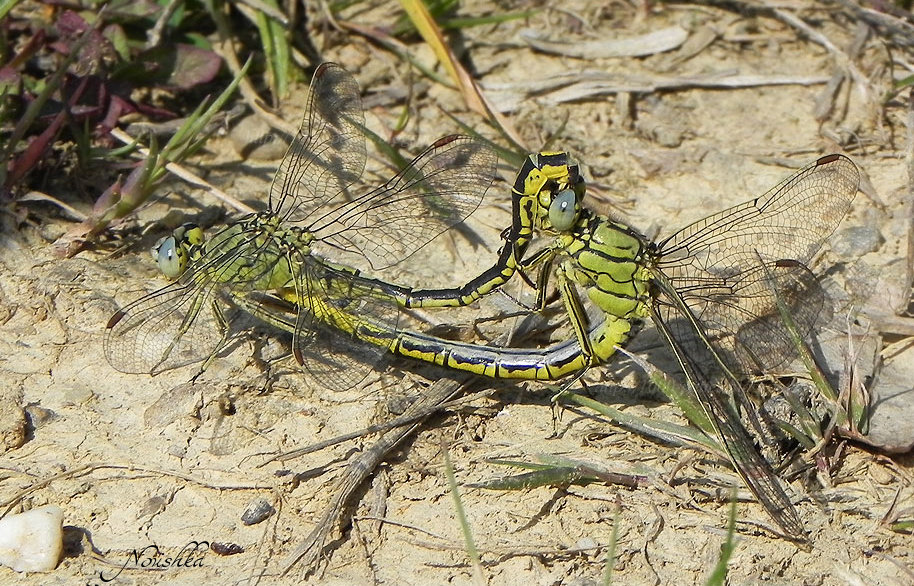
In wheel, south of France
