= Azibo Reservoir Protected Landscape =

Coordinates: 41.58536°N 6.90609°W

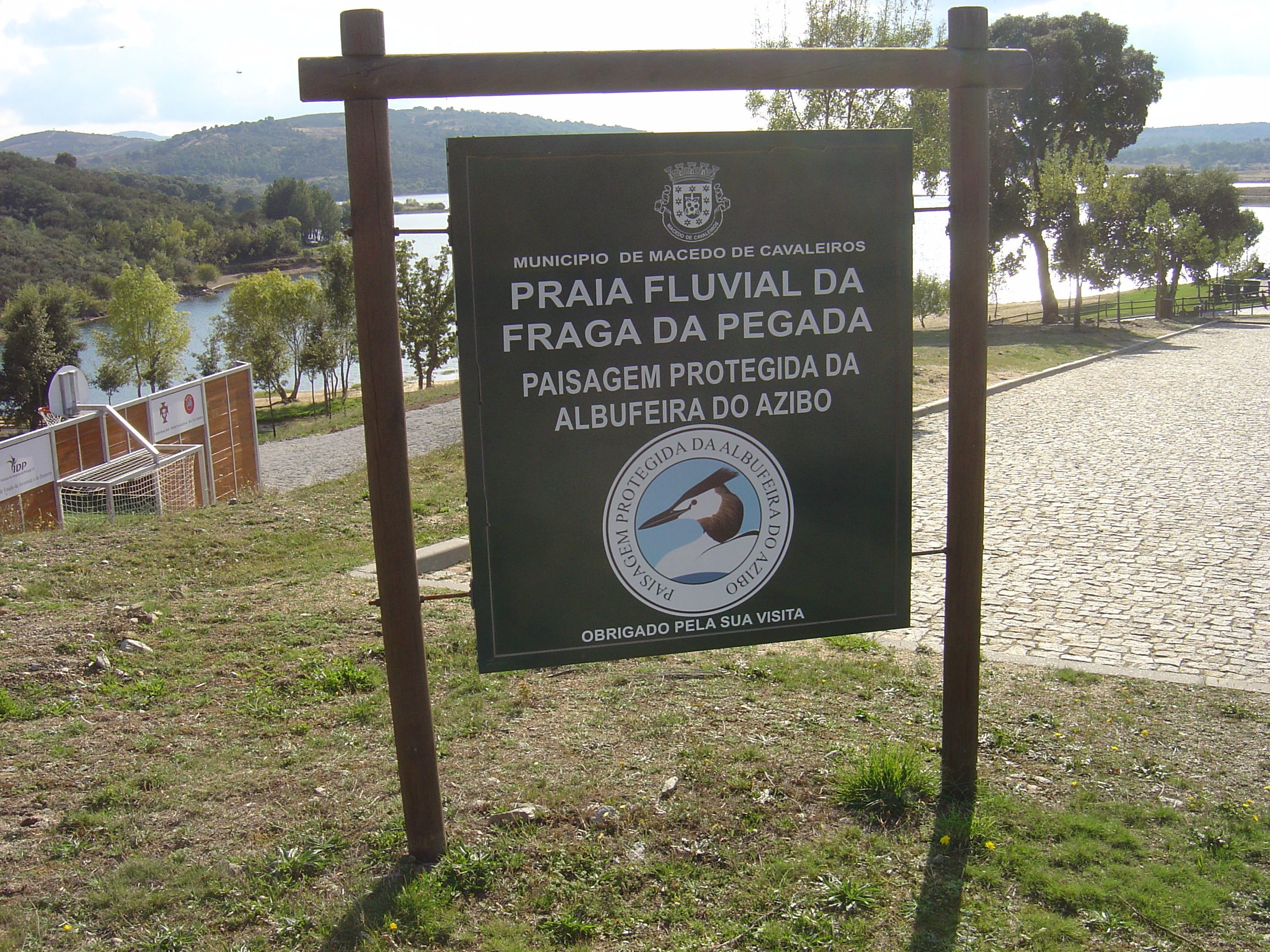
Sign next to the Azibo Reservoir beach.

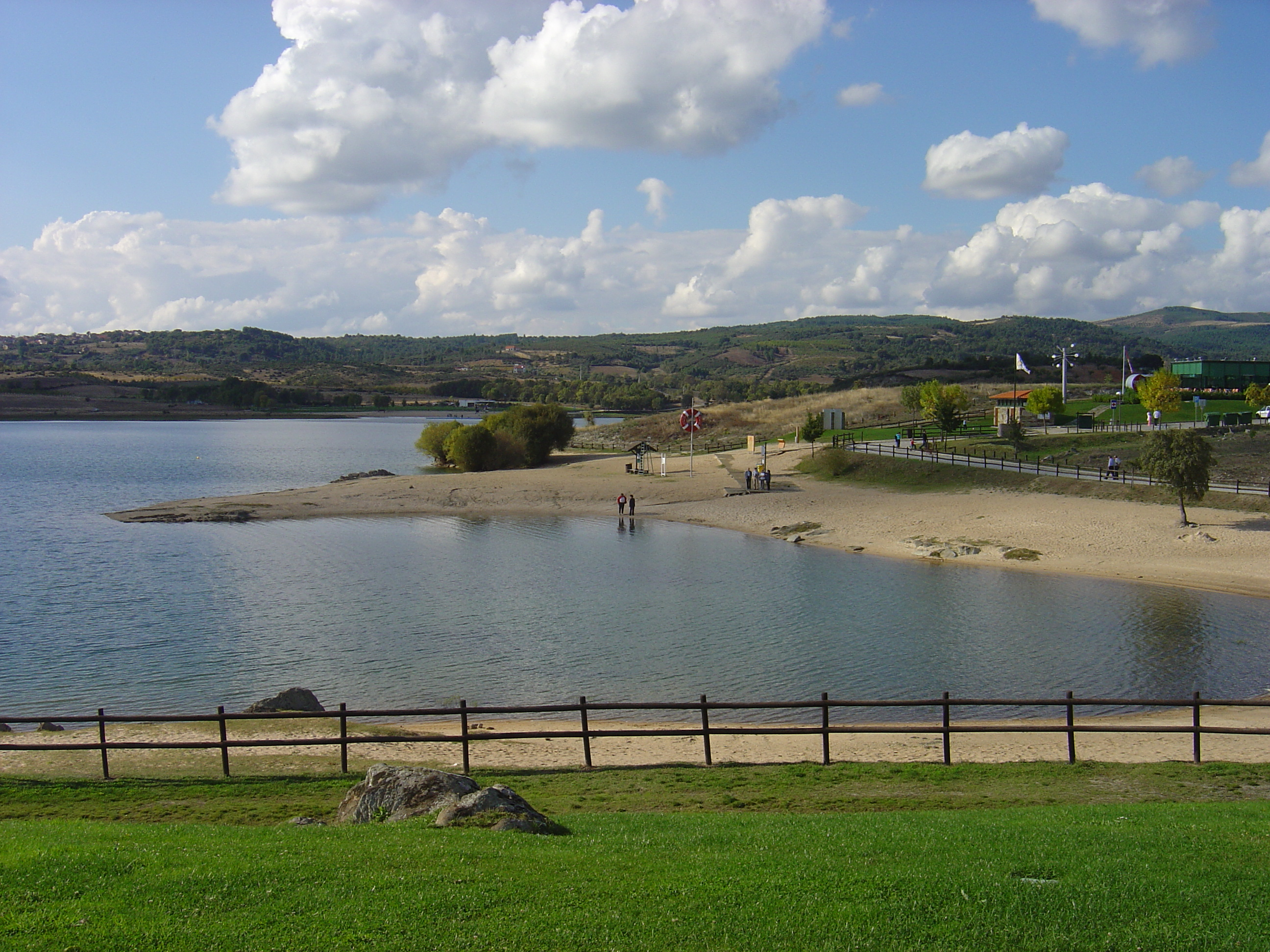
The beach by the shore of the Azibo Reservoir.

Located at 12 km from Macedo de Cavaleiros and 30 km from Bragança at the northeast of Portugal, the Azibo's Lagoon Protected Landscape it is one of the 30 areas which are officially under protection in the country.

Established by Decree No. 13/99 of 3 August, is a protected area of regional interest, partly integrated in the Morais Natura 2000 Site (PTCON0023), it aims the preservation and enhancement of natural heritage in a harmonious combination between the wildlife, the natural habitat of numerous species of flora and fauna, with the leisure and outdoor recreation.

With an area of 4,897 ha, is located, almost entirely, in the municipality of Macedo de Cavaleiros, covering the parishes of Vale da Porca, Santa Combinha, Podence, Salselas, Vale de Prados and Quintela Lampaças of the municipality of Bragança.

== See also ==
- Macedo de Cavaleiros Municipality
- Azibo River
- List of Birds of Azibo Reservoir Protected Landscape
- Morais Natura 2000 Site
