= Jana Rybářová (synchronized swimmer) =

Czech synchronized swimmer

Personal information
- Nationality: Czech Republic
- Born: 13 February 1978 (age 48) Brno, Czech Republic
- Height: 175 cm (5 ft 9 in)
- Weight: 60 kg (130 lb)

Sport
- Sport: Swimming
- Strokes: Synchronized swimming

Jana Rybářová (born 13 February 1978) is a Czech synchronized swimmer.

Jana competed in the women's duet at the 2000 Summer Olympics with her partner, Soňa Bernardová, and finished in fifteenth place.
