= Madeleine Perk =

Swiss synchronized swimmer

Personal information
- Born: 13 May 1975 (age 51) Zürich, Switzerland

Sport
- Sport: Synchronised swimming

Madeleine Perk (born 13 May 1975) is a Swiss former synchronized swimmer who competed in the 2000 Summer Olympics.
