= List of birds of Portugal =

This is a list of the bird species recorded in Portugal. The avifauna of mainland Portugal, the Azores, and Madeira islands included a total of 632 species as of October 2024 according to Avibase. Of them, 16 have been introduced by humans. 3 are endemic to islands, one is extinct.

This list's taxonomic treatment (designation and sequence of orders, families and species) and nomenclature (English and scientific names) are those of IOC World Bird List.

The following tags have been used to highlight some categories of occurrence. The notes such as "Azores only" and the notes of population status such as "endangered" are from Bird Checklists of the World. The latter notes apply to the worldwide population, not just that in Portugal.

- (A) Accidental - a species that rarely or accidentally occurs in mainland Portugal, the Azores, or Madeiras
- (I) Introduced - a species introduced to mainland Portugal, the Azores, or Madeiras as a consequence, direct or indirect, of human actions

== Ducks, geese, and waterfowl ==
Order: Anseriformes Family: Anatidae

Anatidae includes the ducks and most duck-like waterfowl, such as geese and swans. These birds are adapted to an aquatic existence with webbed feet, flattened bills, and feathers that are excellent at shedding water due to an oily coating.

Common name	Binomial	Status
Fulvous whistling duck	Dendrocygna bicolor	(A)
Snow goose	Anser caerulescens	(A) Azores only
Greylag goose	Anser anser	
Greater white-fronted goose	Anser albifrons	(A)
Taiga bean goose	Anser fabalis	
Tundra bean goose	Anser serrirostris	(A)
Pink-footed goose	Anser brachyrhynchus	(A)
Brent goose	Branta bernicla	(A)
Barnacle goose	Branta leucopsis	(A)
Cackling goose	Branta hutchinsii	(A)
Canada goose	Branta canadensis	
Mute swan	Cygnus olor	(A)
Tundra swan	Cygnus columbianus	(A)
Whooper swan	Cygnus cygnus	(A)
Egyptian goose	Alopochen aegyptiaca	(I)
Ruddy shelduck	Tadorna ferruginea	(A)
Common shelduck	Tadorna tadorna	
Muscovy duck	Cairina moschata	(I) Madeiras only
Wood duck	Aix sponsa	(A) Azores only
Garganey	Spatula querquedula	
Blue-billed teal	Spatula hottentota	(A)
Blue-winged teal	Spatula discors	(A)
Northern shoveler	Spatula clypeata	
Gadwall	Mareca strepera	
Eurasian wigeon	Mareca penelope	
American wigeon	Mareca americana	(A)
Mallard	Anas platyrhynchos	
American black duck	Anas rubripes	(A) Azores only
Northern pintail	Anas acuta	
Eurasian teal	Anas crecca	
Green-winged teal	Anas carolinensis	(A)
Marbled teal	Marmaronetta angustirostris	(A) vulnerable
Red-crested pochard	Netta rufina	
Redhead	Aythya americana	(A)
Common pochard	Aythya ferina	vulnerable
Ring-necked duck	Aythya collaris	(A)
Ferruginous duck	Aythya nyroca	near-threatened
Tufted duck	Aythya fuligula	
Greater scaup	Aythya marila	
Lesser scaup	Aythya affinis	(A)
King eider	Somateria spectabilis	(A) Azores only
Common eider	Somateria mollissima	(A) near-threatened
Surf scoter	Melanitta perspicillata	(A)
Velvet scoter	Melanitta fusca	
White-winged scoter	Melanitta deglandi	(A)
Common scoter	Melanitta nigra	
Long-tailed duck	Clangula hyemalis	(A) vulnerable
Bufflehead	Bucephala albeola	(A)
Common goldeneye	Bucephala clangula	(A)
Smew	Mergellus albellus	(A)
Hooded merganser	Lophodytes cucullatus	(A) Azores only
Common merganser	Mergus merganser	
Red-breasted merganser	Mergus serrator	
Ruddy duck	Oxyura jamaicensis	(A)
White-headed duck	Oxyura leucocephala	(A) endangered

== Pheasants, grouse, and allies ==
Order: Galliformes Family: Phasianidae

The Phasianidae are a family of terrestrial birds. In general, they are plump (although they vary in size) and have broad, relatively short wings.

Common name	Binomial	Status
Western capercaillie	Tetrao urogallus	Present in country according to source, but not listed as present in other sources.
Grey partridge	Perdix perdix	Possibly extinct in Portugal
Ring-necked pheasant	Phasianus colchicus	(I)
Common quail	Coturnix coturnix	
Red-legged partridge	Alectoris rufa	

== Flamingos ==
Order: Phoenicopteriformes Family: Phoenicopteridae

Flamingos are gregarious wading birds, usually 1 to 1.5 metres (3 to 5 ft) tall, found in both the Western and eastern Hemispheres. Flamingos filter-feed on shellfish and algae. Their oddly shaped beaks are specially adapted to separate mud and silt from the food they consume and, uniquely, are used upside-down.

Common name	Binomial	Status
Greater flamingo	Phoenicopterus roseus	

== Grebes ==
Order: Podicipediformes Family: Podicipedidae

Grebes are small to medium-large freshwater diving birds. They have lobed toes and are excellent swimmers and divers. However, they have their feet placed far back on the body, making them quite ungainly on land.

Common name	Binomial	Status
Little grebe	Tachybaptus ruficollis	(S)
Pied-billed grebe	Podilymbus podiceps	(A)
Slavonian grebe	Podiceps auritus	(A) vulnerable
Great crested grebe	Podiceps cristatus	
Black-necked grebe	Podiceps nigricollis	

== Pigeons and doves ==
Order: Columbiformes Family: Columbidae

Pigeons and doves are stout-bodied birds with short necks and short slender bills with a fleshy cere.

Common name	Binomial	Status
Rock dove	Columba livia	
Stock dove	Columba oenas	
Common wood pigeon	Columba palumbus	
Trocaz pigeon	Columba trocaz	endemic to the island of Madeira
European turtle dove	Streptopelia turtur	vulnerable
Eurasian collared dove	Streptopelia decaocto	
Mourning dove	Zenaida macroura	(A) Azores only

== Sandgrouse ==
Order: Pterocliformes Family: Pteroclidae

Sandgrouse have small, pigeon like heads and necks, but sturdy compact bodies. They have long pointed wings and sometimes tails and a fast direct flight. Flocks fly to watering holes at dawn and dusk. Their legs are feathered down to the toes.

Common name	Binomial	Status
Pin-tailed sandgrouse	Pterocles alchata	
Black-bellied sandgrouse	Pterocles orientalis	

== Bustards ==
Order: Otidiformes Family: Otididae

Bustards are large terrestrial birds mainly associated with dry open country and steppes in the Old World. They are omnivorous and nest on the ground. They walk steadily on strong legs and big toes, pecking for food as they go. They have long broad wings with "fingered" wingtips and striking patterns in flight. Many have interesting mating displays.

Common name	Binomial	Status
Great bustard	Otis tarda	vulnerable
Little bustard	Tetrax tetrax	near-threatened

== Cuckoos ==
Order: Cuculiformes Family: Cuculidae

The family Cuculidae includes cuckoos, roadrunners and anis. These birds are of variable size with slender bodies, long tails and strong legs. The Old World cuckoos are brood parasites.

Common name	Binomial	Status
Great spotted cuckoo	Clamator glandarius	
Yellow-billed cuckoo	Coccyzus americanus	(A) Azores only
Black-billed cuckoo	Coccyzus erythropthalmus	(A) Azores only
Common cuckoo	Cuculus canorus	

== Nightjars and allies ==
Order: Caprimulgiformes Family: Caprimulgidae

Nightjars are medium-sized nocturnal birds that usually nest on the ground. They have long wings, short legs and very short bills. Most have small feet, of little use for walking, and long pointed wings. Their soft plumage is camouflaged to resemble bark or leaves.

Common name	Binomial	Status
Common nighthawk	Chordeiles minor	(A) Azores and Madeiras only
Red-necked nightjar	Caprimulgus ruficollis	
European nightjar	Caprimulgus europaeus	

== Swifts ==
Order: Caprimulgiformes Family: Apodidae

Swifts are small birds which spend the majority of their lives flying. These birds have very short legs and never settle voluntarily on the ground, perching instead only on vertical surfaces. Many swifts have long swept-back wings which resemble a crescent or boomerang.

Common name	Binomial	Status
Chimney swift	Chaetura pelagica	(A) vulnerable
Alpine swift	Apus melba	
Common swift	Apus apus	
Plain swift	Apus unicolor	Madeiras only
Pallid swift	Apus pallidus	
Little swift	Apus affinis	(A)
White-rumped swift	Apus caffer	

== Rails, gallinules, and coots ==
Order: Gruiformes Family: Rallidae

Rallidae is a large family of small to medium-sized birds which includes the rails, crakes, coots and gallinules. Typically they inhabit dense vegetation in damp environments near lakes, swamps or rivers. In general they are shy and secretive birds, making them difficult to observe. Most species have strong legs and long toes which are well adapted to soft uneven surfaces. They tend to have short, rounded wings and to be weak fliers.

Common name	Binomial	Status
Water rail	Rallus aquaticus	Azores and Madeiras only
Corn crake	Crex crex	(A)
African crake	Crex egregia	(A)
Sora	Porzana carolina	(A)
Spotted crake	Porzana porzana	
Lesser moorhen	Paragallinula angulata	(A)
Common gallinule	Gallinula galeata	(A)
Common moorhen	Gallinula chloropus	
Eurasian coot	Fulica atra	
Red-knobbed coot	Fulica cristata	(A)
American coot	Fulica americana	(A)
Allen's gallinule	Porphyrio alleni	(A)
Purple gallinule	Porphyrio martinica	(A)
Western swamphen	Porphyrio porphyrio	
Little crake	Zapornia parva	(A)
Baillon's crake	Zapornia pusilla	(A)

== Cranes ==
Order: Gruiformes Family: Gruidae

Cranes are large, long-legged and long-necked birds. Unlike the similar-looking but unrelated herons, cranes fly with necks outstretched, not pulled back. Most have elaborate and noisy courting displays or "dances".

Common name	Binomial	Status
Demoiselle crane	Anthropoides virgo	(A)
Sandhill crane	Antigone canadensis	(A) Azores only
Common crane	Grus grus	

== Stone-curlews ==
Order: Charadriiformes Family: Burhinidae

The stone-curlews are a group of largely tropical waders in the family Burhinidae. They are found worldwide within the tropical zone, with some species also breeding in temperate Europe and Australia. They are medium to large waders with strong black or yellow-black bills, large yellow eyes and cryptic plumage. Despite being classed as waders, most species have a preference for arid or semi-arid habitats.

Common name	Binomial	Status
Eurasian stone-curlew	Burhinus oedicnemus	

== Stilts and avocets ==
Order: Charadriiformes Family: Recurvirostridae

Recurvirostridae is a family of large wading birds, which includes the avocets and stilts. The avocets have long legs and long up-curved bills. The stilts have extremely long legs and long, thin, straight bills.

Common name	Binomial	Status
Black-winged stilt	Himantopus himantopus	
Pied avocet	Recurvirostra avosetta	

== Oystercatchers ==
Order: Charadriiformes Family: Haematopodidae

The oystercatchers are large and noisy plover-like birds, with strong bills used for smashing or prising open molluscs.

Common name	Binomial	Status
Eurasian oystercatcher	Haematopus ostralegus	near-threatened

== Plovers and lapwings ==
Order: Charadriiformes Family: Charadriidae

The family Charadriidae includes the plovers, dotterels and lapwings. They are small to medium-sized birds with compact bodies, short, thick necks and long, usually pointed, wings. They are found in open country worldwide, mostly in habitats near water.

Common name	Binomial	Status
Grey plover	Pluvialis squatarola	
European golden plover	Pluvialis apricaria	
American golden plover	Pluvialis dominica	(A)
Pacific golden plover	Pluvialis fulva	(A) Azores and Madeiras only
Northern lapwing	Vanellus vanellus	near-threatened
Sociable lapwing	Vanellus gregarius	(A) critically endangered
Lesser sand plover	Charadrius mongolus	(A)
Greater sand plover	Charadrius leschenaultii	(A)
Caspian plover	Charadrius asiaticus	
Kentish plover	Charadrius alexandrinus	
Common ringed plover	Charadrius hiaticula	
Semipalmated plover	Charadrius semipalmatus	(A) Azores only
Little ringed plover	Charadrius dubius	
Killdeer	Charadrius vociferus	(A)
Eurasian dotterel	Charadrius morinellus	(A)

== Sandpipers and allies ==
Order: Charadriiformes Family: Scolopacidae

Scolopacidae is a large diverse family of small to medium-sized shorebirds including the sandpipers, curlews, godwits, shanks, tattlers, woodcocks, snipes, dowitchers and phalaropes. The majority of these species eat small invertebrates picked out of the mud or soil. Variation in length of legs and bills enables multiple species to feed in the same habitat, particularly on the coast, without direct competition for food.

Common name	Binomial	Status
Upland sandpiper	Bartramia longicauda	(A)
Eurasian whimbrel	Numenius phaeopus	
Hudsonian whimbrel	Numenius hudsonicus	
Slender-billed curlew	Numenius tenuirostris	(A) critically endangered
Eurasian curlew	Numenius arquata	near-threatened
Bar-tailed godwit	Limosa lapponica	near-threatened
Black-tailed godwit	Limosa limosa	near-threatened
Hudsonian godwit	Limosa haemastica	(A) Azores only
Ruddy turnstone	Arenaria interpres	
Red knot	Calidris canutus	near-threatened
Ruff	Calidris pugnax	
Broad-billed sandpiper	Calidris falcinellus	(A)
Sharp-tailed sandpiper	Calidris acuminata	(A)
Stilt sandpiper	Calidris himantopus	(A)
Curlew sandpiper	Calidris ferruginea	near-threatened
Temminck's stint	Calidris temminckii	
Red-necked stint	Calidris ruficollis	(A)
Sanderling	Calidris alba	
Dunlin	Calidris alpina	
Purple sandpiper	Calidris maritima	
Baird's sandpiper	Calidris bairdii	(A)
Little stint	Calidris minuta	
Least sandpiper	Calidris minutilla	(A) Azores only
White-rumped sandpiper	Calidris fuscicollis	(A)
Buff-breasted sandpiper	Calidris subruficollis	(A), near-threatened
Pectoral sandpiper	Calidris melanotos	(A)
Semipalmated sandpiper	Calidris pusilla	(A) near-threatened
Western sandpiper	Calidris mauri	(A) Azores and Madeiras only
Short-billed dowitcher	Limnodromus griseus	(A)
Long-billed dowitcher	Limnodromus scolopaceus	(A) Azores only
Jack snipe	Lymnocryptes minimus	
Eurasian woodcock	Scolopax rusticola	
Great snipe	Gallinago media	(A) near-threatened
Common snipe	Gallinago gallinago	
Wilson's snipe	Gallinago delicata	(A)
Terek sandpiper	Xenus cinereus	(A)
Wilson's phalarope	Phalaropus tricolor	(A)
Red-necked phalarope	Phalaropus lobatus	
Red phalarope	Phalaropus fulicarius	
Common sandpiper	Actitis hypoleucos	
Spotted sandpiper	Actitis macularius	(A)
Green sandpiper	Tringa ochropus	
Solitary sandpiper	Tringa solitaria	(A)
Grey-tailed tattler	Tringa brevipes	(A) Azores only, near-threatened
Spotted redshank	Tringa erythropus	
Greater yellowlegs	Tringa melanoleuca	(A)
Common greenshank	Tringa nebularia	
Willet	Tringa semipalmata	(A)
Lesser yellowlegs	Tringa flavipes	(A)
Marsh sandpiper	Tringa stagnatilis	
Wood sandpiper	Tringa glareola	
Common redshank	Tringa totanus	

== Buttonquail ==
Order: Charadriiformes Family: Turnicidae

The buttonquail are small, drab, running birds which resemble the true quails. The female is the brighter of the sexes and initiates courtship. The male incubates the eggs and tends the young.

Common name	Binomial	Status
Small buttonquail	Turnix sylvaticus	(A)

== Pratincoles and coursers ==
Order: Charadriiformes Family: Glareolidae

Glareolidae is a family of wading birds comprising the pratincoles, which have short legs, long pointed wings and long forked tails, and the coursers, which have long legs, short wings and long, pointed bills which curve downwards.

Common name	Binomial	Status
Cream-coloured courser	Cursorius cursor	(A)
Collared pratincole	Glareola pratincola	

== Skuas and jaegers ==
Order: Charadriiformes Family: Stercorariidae

The family Stercorariidae are, in general, medium to large birds, typically with grey or brown plumage, often with white markings on the wings. They nest on the ground in temperate and arctic regions and are long-distance migrants.

Common name	Binomial	Status
Great skua	Stercorarius skua	
South polar skua	Stercorarius maccormicki	(A)
Pomarine skua	Stercorarius pomarinus	
Arctic skua	Stercorarius parasiticus	
Long-tailed skua	Stercorarius longicaudus	(A)

== Auks, guillemots, and puffins ==
Order: Charadriiformes Family: Alcidae

Auks are superficially similar to penguins due to their black-and-white colours, their upright posture and some of their habits, however they are not related to the penguins and differ in being able to fly. Auks live on the open sea, only deliberately coming ashore to nest.

Common name	Binomial	Status
Little auk	Alle alle	
Common guillemot	Uria aalge	
Razorbill	Alca torda	near-threatened
Atlantic puffin	Fratercula arctica	vulnerable

== Gulls, terns, and skimmers ==
Order: Charadriiformes Family: Laridae

Laridae is a family of medium to large seabirds, the gulls, terns, and skimmers. Gulls are typically grey or white, often with black markings on the head or wings. They have stout, longish bills and webbed feet. Terns are a group of generally medium to large seabirds typically with grey or white plumage, often with black markings on the head. Most terns hunt fish by diving but some pick insects off the surface of fresh water. Terns are generally long-lived birds, with several species known to live in excess of 30 years.

Common name	Binomial	Status
Black-legged kittiwake	Rissa tridactyla	vulnerable
Ivory gull	Pagophila eburnea	(A) near-threatened
Sabine's gull	Xema sabini	
Slender-billed gull	Chroicocephalus genei	
Bonaparte's gull	Chroicocephalus philadelphia	
Black-headed gull	Chroicocephalus ridibundus	
Little gull	Hydrocoloeus minutus	
Ross's gull	Rhodostethia rosea	(A)
Laughing gull	Leucophaeus atricilla	(A)
Franklin's gull	Leucophaeus pipixcan	(A)
Mediterranean gull	Ichthyaetus melanocephalus	
Pallas's gull	Ichthyaetus ichthyaetus	
Audouin's gull	Ichthyaetus audouinii	
Common gull	Larus canus	
Short-billed gull	Larus brachyrhynchus	(A)
Ring-billed gull	Larus delawarensis	
American herring gull	Larus smithsonianus	
European herring gull	Larus argentatus	
Yellow-legged gull	Larus michahellis	
Caspian gull	Larus cachinnans	
Iceland gull	Larus glaucoides	(A)
Lesser black-backed gull	Larus fuscus	
Glaucous gull	Larus hyperboreus	(A)
Great black-backed gull	Larus marinus	(A)
Kelp gull	Larus dominicanus	(A)
Brown noddy	Anous stolidus	(A) Azores only
Sooty tern	Onychoprion fuscatus	(A)
Bridled tern	Onychoprion anaethetus	(A) Azores only
Little tern	Sternula albifrons	
Least tern	Sternula antillarum	(A)
Gull-billed tern	Gelochelidon nilotica	
Caspian tern	Hydroprogne caspia	
Black tern	Chlidonias niger	
White-winged tern	Chlidonias leucopterus	
Whiskered tern	Chlidonias hybrida	
Roseate tern	Sterna dougallii	
Common tern	Sterna hirundo	
Arctic tern	Sterna paradisaea	
Forster's tern	Sterna forsteri	(A)
Sandwich tern	Thalasseus sandvicensis	
Elegant tern	Thalasseus elegans	(A)
Lesser crested tern	Thalasseus bengalensis	(A)
West African crested tern	Thalasseus albididorsalis	(A)

== Tropicbirds ==
Order: Phaethontiformes Family: Phaethontidae

Tropicbirds are slender white birds of tropical oceans with exceptionally long central tail feathers. Their long wings have black markings, as does the head.

Common name	Binomial	Status
White-tailed tropicbird	Phaethon lepturus	(A)
Red-billed tropicbird	Phaeton aethereus	(A)

== Divers ==
Order: Gaviiformes Family: Gaviidae

Divers, known as loons in North America, are a group of aquatic birds found in many parts of North America and northern Europe. They are the size of a large duck or small goose, which they somewhat resemble when swimming, but to which they are completely unrelated.

Common name	Binomial	Status
Red-throated diver	Gavia stellata	(A)
Black-throated diver	Gavia arctica	(A)
Great northern diver	Gavia immer	(A)

== Albatrosses ==
Order: Procellariiformes Family: Diomedeidae

The albatrosses are among the largest flying birds, with long, narrow wings for gliding. The majority are found in the Southern Hemisphere with only vagrants occurring in the North Atlantic.

Common name	Binomial	Status
Atlantic yellow-nosed albatross	Thalassarche chlororhynchos	(A)
Black-browed albatross	Thalassarche melanophris	(A)
Wandering albatross	Diomedea exulans	

== Southern storm petrels ==
Order: Procellariiformes Family: Oceanitidae

Southern storm petrels, are seabirds in the family Oceanitidae, part of the order Procellariiformes. These smallest of seabirds feed on planktonic crustaceans and small fish picked from the surface, typically while hovering. Their flight is fluttering and sometimes bat-like.

Common name	Binomial	Status
Wilson's storm petrel	Oceanites oceanicus	
White-faced storm petrel	Pelagodroma marina	
Black-bellied storm petrel	Fregetta tropica	(A)

== Northern storm petrels ==
Order: Procellariiformes Family: Hydrobatidae

The northern storm petrels are relatives of the petrels and are the smallest seabirds. They feed on planktonic crustaceans and small fish picked from the surface, typically while hovering. The flight is fluttering and sometimes bat-like.

Common name	Binomial	Status
European storm petrel	Hydrobates pelagicus	
Leach's storm petrel	Hydrobates leucorhous	vulnerable
Swinhoe's storm petrel	Hydrobates monorhis	(A) near-threatened
Band-rumped storm petrel	Hydrobates castro	
Monteiro's storm petrel	Hydrobates monteiroi	breeding endemic in the Azores, vulnerable

== Shearwaters and petrels ==
Order: Procellariiformes Family: Procellariidae

The procellariids are the main group of medium-sized shearwaters and petrels, characterised by united nostrils with medium septum and a long outer functional primary.

Common name	Binomial	Status
Northern fulmar	Fulmarus glacialis	(A)
Kermadec petrel	Pterodroma neglecta	(A)
Trindade petrel	Pterodroma arminjoniana	(A) Azores only, vulnerable
Zino's petrel	Pterodroma Madeiras	Azores and Madeiras only, endangered
Fea's petrel	Pterodroma feae	
Bermuda petrel	Pterodroma cahow	(A) Azores only, endangered
Black-capped petrel	Pterodroma hasitata	(A) Azores and Madeiras only
Bulwer's petrel	Bulweria bulwerii	
Cory's shearwater	Calonectis diomedea	
Cape Verde shearwater	Calonectris edwardsii	Madeiras only, near-threatened
Flesh-footed shearwater	Ardenna carneipes	(A)
Great shearwater	Ardenna gravis	
Sooty shearwater	Ardenna griseus	near-threatened
Manx shearwater	Puffinus puffinus	
Yelkouan shearwater	Puffinus yelkouan	(A)
Balearic shearwater	Puffinus mauretanicus	critically endangered
Barolo shearwater	Puffinus baroli	

== Storks ==
Order: Ciconiiformes Family: Ciconiidae

Storks are large, long-legged, long-necked, wading birds with long, stout bills. Storks are mute, but bill-clattering is an important mode of communication at the nest. Their nests can be large and may be reused for many years. Many species are migratory.

Common name	Binomial	Status
Black stork	Ciconia nigra	
White stork	Ciconia ciconia	
Yellow-billed stork	Mycteria ibis	(A)

== Frigatebirds ==
Order: Suliformes Family: Fregatidae

Frigatebirds are large seabirds usually found over tropical oceans. They are large, black, or black-and-white, with long wings and deeply forked tails. The males have red inflatable throat pouches. They do not swim or walk and cannot take off from a flat surface. Having the largest wingspan-to-body-weight ratio of any bird, they are essentially aerial, able to stay aloft for more than a week.

Common name	Binomial	Status
Magnificent frigatebird	Fregata magnificens	(A)

== Boobies and gannets ==
Order: Suliformes Family: Sulidae

The sulids comprise the gannets and boobies. Both groups are medium to large coastal seabirds that plunge-dive for fish.

Common name	Binomial	Status
Masked booby	Sula dactylatra	(A) Azores only
Brown booby	Sula leucogaster	(A)
Red-footed booby	Sula sula	(A) Azores only
Northern gannet	Morus bassanus	
Cape gannet	Morus capensis	(A) Azores only, endangered

== Cormorants and shags ==
Order: Suliformes Family: Phalacrocoracidae

Phalacrocoracidae is a family of medium to large coastal, fish-eating seabirds that includes cormorants and shags. Plumage colouration varies, with the majority having mainly dark plumage, some species being black-and-white and a few being colourful.

Common name	Binomial	Status
Great cormorant	Phalacrocorax carbo	(S)
European shag	Gulosus aristotelis	
Double-crested cormorant	Nannopterum auritum	(A) Azores only

== Pelicans ==
Order: Pelecaniformes Family: Pelecanidae

Pelicans are large water birds with a distinctive pouch under their beak. As with other members of the order Pelecaniformes, they have webbed feet with four toes.

Common name	Binomial	Status
Pink-backed pelican	Pelecanus rufescens	(A)

== Herons, egrets, and bitterns ==
Order: Pelecaniformes Family: Ardeidae

The family Ardeidae contains the bitterns, herons and egrets. Herons and egrets are medium to large wading birds with long necks and legs. Bitterns tend to be shorter necked and more wary. Members of Ardeidae fly with their necks retracted, unlike other long-necked birds such as storks, ibises and spoonbills.

Common name	Binomial	Status
American bittern	Botaurus lentiginosus	(A) Azores only
Great bittern	Botaurus stellaris	
Little bittern	Ixobrychus minutus	
Least bittern	Ixobrychus exilis	(A) Azores and Madeiras only
Great blue heron	Ardea herodias	(A) Azores only
Grey heron	Ardea cinerea	
Purple heron	Ardea purpurea	
Great egret	Ardea alba	(A)
Little egret	Egretta garzetta	(S)
Western reef heron	Egretta gularis	(A)
Snowy egret	Egretta thula	(A) Azores only
Little blue heron	Egretta caerulea	(A) Azores only
Tricolored heron	Egretta tricolor	(A) Azores only
Western cattle egret	Bubulcus ibis	
Squacco heron	Ardeola ralloides	
Green heron	Butorides virescens	(A)
Black-crowned night heron	Nycticorax nycticorax	
Yellow-crowned night heron	Nyctanassa violacea	(A) Azores and Madeiras only

== Ibises and spoonbills ==
Order: Pelecaniformes Family: Threskiornithidae

Threskiornithidae is a family of large terrestrial and wading birds which includes the ibises and spoonbills. They have long, broad wings with 11 primary and about 20 secondary feathers. They are strong fliers and despite their size and weight, very capable soarers.

Common name	Binomial	Status
Glossy ibis	Plegadis falcinellus	
African sacred ibis	Threskiornis aethiopicus	(I)
Northern bald ibis	Geronticus eremita	(I) Azores only, endangered
Eurasian spoonbill	Platalea leucorodia	

== Osprey ==
Order: Accipitriformes Family: Pandionidae

The family Pandionidae contains only one species, the osprey. The osprey is a medium-large raptor which is a specialist fish-eater with a worldwide distribution.

Common name	Binomial	Status
Osprey	Pandion haliaetus	

== Hawks, eagles, and kites ==
Order: Accipitriformes Family: Accipitridae

Accipitridae is a family of birds of prey, which includes hawks, eagles, kites, harriers and Old World vultures. These birds have powerful hooked beaks for tearing flesh from their prey, strong legs, powerful talons and keen eyesight.

Common name	Binomial	Status
Black-winged kite	Elanus caeruleus	
Bearded vulture	Gypaetus barbatus	(listed as vagrant by IUCN) near-threatened
Egyptian vulture	Neophron percnopterus	endangered
European honey buzzard	Pernis apivorus	
Swallow-tailed kite	Elanoides forficatus	(A)
Black vulture	Aegypius monachus	near-threatened
White-backed vulture	Gyps africanus	(A) critically endangered
Rüppell's vulture	Gyps rueppelli	critically endangered
Griffon vulture	Gyps fulvus	
Short-toed snake eagle	Circaetus gallicus	
Lesser spotted eagle	Clanga pomarina	(A)
Greater spotted eagle	Clanga clanga	(A) vulnerable
Booted eagle	Hieraaetus pennatus	
Tawny eagle	Aquila rapax	(A)
Steppe eagle	Aquila nipalensis	(A); endangered
Spanish eagle	Aquila adalberti	vulnerable
Golden eagle	Aquila chrysaetos	
Bonelli's eagle	Aquila fasciata	
Eurasian marsh harrier	Circus aeruginosus	
Hen harrier	Circus cyaneus	
Northern harrier	Circus hudsonius	(A) Azores only
Pallid harrier	Circus macrourus	(A) near-threatened
Montagu's harrier	Circus pygargus	
Eurasian sparrowhawk	Accipiter nisus	
Northern goshawk	Accipiter gentilis	
Red kite	Milvus milvus	
Black kite	Milvus migrans	
White-tailed eagle	Haliaeetus albicilla	(Ex)
Rough-legged buzzard	Buteo lagopus	(A) Azores only
Common buzzard	Buteo buteo	
Long-legged buzzard	Buteo rufinus	

== Barn owls ==
Order: Strigiformes Family: Tytonidae

Barn owls are medium to large owls with large heads and characteristic heart-shaped faces. They have long strong legs with powerful talons.

Common name	Binomial	Status
Western barn owl	Tyto alba	

== Owls ==
Order: Strigiformes Family: Strigidae

The typical owls are small to large solitary nocturnal birds of prey. They have large forward-facing eyes and ears, a hawk-like beak and a conspicuous circle of feathers around each eye called a facial disk.

Common name	Binomial	Status
Eurasian scops owl	Otus scops	
Eurasian eagle-owl	Bubo bubo	
Snowy owl	Bubo scandiacus	(A) Azores only, vulnerable
Little owl	Athene noctua	
Tawny owl	Strix aluco	
Long-eared owl	Asio otus	
Short-eared owl	Asio flammeus	
Marsh owl	Asio capensis	(A)

== Hoopoes ==
Order: Bucerotiformes Family: Upupidae

Hoopoes have black, white and orangey-pink colouring with a large erectile crest on their head.

Common name	Binomial	Status
Eurasian hoopoe	Upupa epops	(S)

== Kingfishers ==
Order: Coraciiformes Family: Alcedinidae

Kingfishers are medium-sized birds with large heads, long, pointed bills, short legs and stubby tails.

Common name	Binomial	Status
Common kingfisher	Alcedo atthis	
Belted kingfisher	Ceryle alcyon	(A) Azores only

== Bee-eaters ==
Order: Coraciiformes Family: Meropidae

The bee-eaters are a group of coraciiform birds in the family Meropidae. Most species are found in Africa but others occur in southern Europe, Madagascar, Australia and New Guinea. They are characterised by richly coloured plumage, slender bodies and usually elongated central tail feathers. All are colourful and have long downturned bills and pointed wings, which give them a swallow-like appearance when seen from afar.

Common name	Binomial	Status
Blue-cheeked bee-eater	Merops persicus	(A)
European bee-eater	Merops apiaster	

== Rollers ==
Order: Coraciiformes Family: Coraciidae

Rollers resemble crows in size and build, but are more closely related to the kingfishers and bee-eaters. They share the colourful appearance of those groups with blues and browns predominating. The two inner front toes are connected, but the outer toe is not.

Common name	Binomial	Status
European roller	Coracias garrulus	

== Woodpeckers ==
Order: Piciformes Family: Picidae

Woodpeckers are small to medium-sized birds with chisel-like beaks, short legs, stiff tails and long tongues used for capturing insects. Some species have feet with two toes pointing forward and two backward, while several species have only three toes. Many woodpeckers have the habit of tapping noisily on tree trunks with their beaks.

Common name	Binomial	Status
Eurasian wryneck	Jynx torquilla	
Yellow-bellied sapsucker	Sphyrapicus varius	(A) Azores only
Great spotted woodpecker	Dendrocopos major	
Lesser spotted woodpecker	Dendrocopos minor	
Iberian green woodpecker	Picus sharpei	near-threatened
Northern flicker	Colaptes auratus	(A) Azores only

== Falcons and caracaras ==
Order: Falconiformes Family: Falconidae

Falconidae is a family of diurnal birds of prey. They differ from hawks, eagles and kites in that they kill with their beaks instead of their talons.

Common name	Binomial	Status
Lesser kestrel	Falco naumanni	
Eurasian kestrel	Falco tinnunculus	
American kestrel	Falco sparverius	(A) Azores only
Red-footed falcon	Falco vespertinus	near-threatened
Amur falcon	Falco amurensis	(A) Azores only
Eleonora's falcon	Falco eleonorae	
Merlin	Falco columbarius	
Eurasian hobby	Falco subbuteo	
Lanner falcon	Falco biarmicus	(A)
Saker falcon	Falco cherrug	(A) endangered
Gyrfalcon	Falco rusticolus	
Peregrine falcon	Falco peregrinus	

== Old World parrots ==
Order: Psittaciformes Family: Psittaculidae

Characteristic features of parrots include a strong curved bill, an upright stance, strong legs, and clawed zygodactyl feet. Many parrots are vividly coloured, and some are multi-coloured. In size they range from 8 cm (3.1 in) to 1 m (3.3 ft) in length. Old World parrots are found from Africa east across south and southeast Asia and Oceania to Australia and New Zealand.

Common name	Binomial	Status
Rose-ringed parakeet	Psittacula krameri	(I)

== African and New World parrots ==
Order: Psittaciformes Family: Psittacidae

Most of the more than 150 species in this family are found in the New World.

Common name	Binomial	Status
Monk parakeet	Myiopsitta monachus	(I)

== Tyrant flycatchers ==
Order: Passeriformes Family: Tyrannidae

Tyrant flycatchers are Passerine birds which occur throughout North and South America. They superficially resemble the Old World flycatchers, but are more robust and have stronger bills. They do not have the sophisticated vocal capabilities of the songbirds. Most, but not all, are rather plain. As the name implies, most are insectivorous.

Common name	Binomial	Status
Eastern wood pewee	Contopus virens	(A) Azores only
Western kingbird	Tyrannus verticalis	(A) Azores only

== Vireos, shrike-babblers, and erpornis ==
Order: Passeriformes Family: Vireonidae

The vireos are a group of small to medium-sized passerine birds restricted to the New World and Southeast Asia.

Common name	Binomial	Status
White-eyed vireo	Vireo griseus	(A) Azores only
Yellow-throated vireo	Vireo flavifrons	(A) Azores only
Philadelphia vireo	Vireo philadelphicus	(A) Azores only
Warbling vireo	Vireo gilvus	(A) Azores only
Red-eyed vireo	Vireo olivaceus	(A) Azores only

== Old World orioles ==
Order: Passeriformes Family: Oriolidae

The Old World orioles are colourful passerine birds. They are not related to the New World orioles.

Common name	Binomial	Status
Eurasian golden oriole	Oriolus oriolus	

== Shrikes ==
Order: Passeriformes Family: Laniidae

Shrikes are passerine birds known for their habit of catching other birds and small animals and impaling the uneaten portions of their bodies on thorns. A shrike's beak is hooked, like that of a typical bird of prey.

Common name	Binomial	Status
Red-backed shrike	Lanius collurio	
Red-tailed shrike	Lanius phoenicuroides	(A)
Northern shrike	Lanius borealis	(A) Azores only
Iberian grey shrike	Lanius meridionalis	vulnerable
Great grey shrike	Lanius excubitor	(S)
Lesser grey shrike	Lanius minor	(A)
Woodchat shrike	Lanius senator	near-threatened

== Crows, jays, and magpies ==
Order: Passeriformes Family: Corvidae

The family Corvidae includes crows, ravens, jays, choughs, magpies, treepies, nutcrackers and ground jays. Corvids are above average in size among the Passeriformes, and some of the larger species show high levels of intelligence.

Common name	Binomial	Status
Eurasian jay	Garrulus glandarius	
Iberian magpie	Cyanopica cooki	
Eurasian magpie	Pica pica	
Eurasian nutcracker	Nucifraga caryocatactes	(A)
Red-billed chough	Pyrrhocorax pyrrhocorax	
Eurasian jackdaw	Corvus monedula	
Rook	Corvus frugilegus	(A)
Carrion crow	Corvus corone	
Hooded crow	Corvus cornix	(A)
Pied crow	Corvus albus	(A)
Brown-necked raven	Corvus ruficollis	(A)
Common raven	Corvus corax	

== Tits, chickadees, and titmice ==
Order: Passeriformes Family: Paridae

The Paridae are mainly small stocky woodland species with short stout bills. Some have crests. They are adaptable birds, with a mixed diet including seeds and insects.

Common name	Binomial	Status
Coal tit	Periparus ater	
Crested tit	Lophophanes cristatus	
Eurasian blue tit	Cyanistes caeruleus	
Great tit	Parus major	

== Penduline tits ==
Order: Passeriformes Family: Remizidae

The penduline tits are a group of small passerine birds related to the true tits. They are insectivores.

Common name	Binomial	Status
Eurasian penduline tit	Remiz pendulinus	

== Larks ==
Order: Passeriformes Family: Alaudidae

Larks are small terrestrial birds with often extravagant songs and display flights. Most larks are fairly dull in appearance. Their food is insects and seeds.

Common name	Binomial	Status
Horned lark	Eremophila alpestris	(A)
Greater short-toed lark	Calandrella brachydactyla	
Calandra lark	Melanocorypha calandra	
Dupont's lark	Chersophilus duponti	extinct in Portugal, near-threatened
Mediterranean short-toed lark	Alaudala rufescens	
Wood lark	Lullula arborea	
Eurasian skylark	Alauda arvensis	
Thekla's lark	Galerida theklae	
Crested lark	Galerida cristata	

== Cisticolas and allies ==
Order: Passeriformes Family: Cisticolidae

The Cisticolidae are warblers found mainly in warmer southern regions of the Old World. They are generally very small birds of drab brown or grey appearance found in open country such as grassland or scrub.

Common name	Binomial	Status
Zitting cisticola	Cisticola juncidis	

== Reed warblers and allies ==
Order: Passeriformes Family: Acrocephalidae

The members of this family are usually rather large for "warblers". Most are rather plain olivaceous brown above with much yellow to beige below. They are usually found in open woodland, reedbeds, or tall grass. The family occurs mostly in southern to western Eurasia and surroundings, but it also ranges far into the Pacific, with some species in Africa.

Common name	Binomial	Status
Booted warbler	Iduna caligata	(A)
Eastern olivaceous warbler	Iduna pallida	
Western olivaceous warbler	Iduna opaca	
Melodious warbler	Hippolais polyglotta	
Icterine warbler	Hippolais icterina	
Aquatic warbler	Acrocephalus paludicola	(A) vulnerable
Moustached warbler	Acrocephalus melanopogon	(A)
Sedge warbler	Acrocephalus schoenobaenus	
Paddyfield warbler	Acrocephalus agricola	(A)
Blyth's reed warbler	Acrocephalus dumetorum	(A)
Marsh warbler	Acrocephalus palustris	(A)
Common reed warbler	Acrocephalus scirpaceus	
Great reed warbler	Acrocephalus arundinaceus	

== Grassbirds and allies ==
Order: Passeriformes Family: Locustellidae

Locustellidae are a family of small insectivorous songbirds found mainly in Eurasia, Africa, and the Australian region. They are smallish birds with tails that are usually long and pointed, and tend to be drab brownish or buffy all over.

Common name	Binomial	Status
Pallas's grasshopper warbler	Helopsaltes certhiola	(A)
River warbler	Locustella fluviatilis	Madeiras only
Savi's warbler	Locustella luscinioides	(S)
Common grasshopper warbler	Locustella naevia	

== Swallows ==
Order: Passeriformes Family: Hirundinidae

The family Hirundinidae is adapted to aerial feeding. They have a slender streamlined body, long pointed wings and a short bill with a wide gape. The feet are adapted to perching rather than walking, and the front toes are partially joined at the base.

Common name	Binomial	Status
Purple martin	Progne subis	(A) Azores only
Tree Swallow	Tachycineta bicolor	(A) Azores only
Brown-throated martin	Riparia paludicola	(A)
Sand martin	Riparia riparia	
Eurasian crag martin	Ptyonoprogne rupestris	
Barn swallow	Hirundo rustica	
Red-rumped swallow	Cecropis daurica	(S)
American cliff swallow	Petrochelidon pyrrhonota	(A) Azores only
Common house martin	Delichon urbicum	

== Leaf warblers ==
Order: Passeriformes Family: Phylloscopidae

Leaf warblers are a family of small insectivorous birds found mostly in Eurasia and ranging into Wallacea and Africa. The species are of various sizes, often green-plumaged above and yellow below, or more subdued with greyish-green to greyish-brown colours.

Common name	Binomial	Status
Wood warbler	Phylloscopus sibilatrix	(A)
Western Bonelli's warbler	Phylloscopus bonelli	
Yellow-browed warbler	Phylloscopus inornatus	(A)
Hume's warbler	Phylloscopus humei	(A)
Pallas's leaf warbler	Phylloscopus proregulus	(A)
Dusky warbler	Phylloscopus fuscatus	(A)
Willow warbler	Phylloscopus trochilus	
Common chiffchaff	Phylloscopus collybita	
Iberian chiffchaff	Phylloscopus ibericus	
Greenish warbler	Phylloscopus trochiloides	(A)
Arctic warbler	Phylloscopus borealis	(A)

== Bush warblers and allies ==
Order: Passeriformes Family: Cettiidae

The members of this family are found throughout Africa, Asia, and Polynesia. Their taxonomy is in flux, and some authorities place some genera in other families.

Common name	Binomial	Status
Cetti's warbler	Cettia cetti	

== Long-tailed tits ==
Order: Passeriformes Family: Aegithalidae

Long-tailed tits are a group of small passerine birds with medium to long tails. They make woven bag nests in trees. Most eat a mixed diet which includes insects.

Common name	Binomial	Status
Long-tailed tit	Aegithalos caudatus	(S)

== Sylviid warblers, parrotbills, and allies ==
Order: Passeriformes Family: Sylviidae

The family Sylviidae is a group of small insectivorous passerine birds. They mainly occur as breeding species, as the common name implies, in Europe, Asia and, to a lesser extent, Africa. Most are of generally undistinguished appearance, but many have distinctive songs.

Common name	Binomial	Status
Eurasian blackcap	Sylvia atricapilla	
Garden warbler	Sylvia borin	
Barred warbler	Curruca nisoria	(A)
Lesser whitethroat	Curruca curruca	(A)
Western Orphean warbler	Curruca hortensis	
Menetries's warbler	Curruca mystacea	(A)
Sardinian warbler	Curruca melanocephala	
Western subalpine warbler	Curruca iberiae	
Eastern subalpine warbler	Curruca cantillans	
Common whitethroat	Curruca communis	
Spectacled warbler	Curruca conspicillata	
Dartford warbler	Curruca undata	near-threatened

== Crests and kinglets ==
Order: Passeriformes Family: Regulidae

The crests, also called kinglets in North America, are a small group of birds often included in the Old World warblers, but frequently given family status because they also resemble the titmice.

Common name	Binomial	Status
Ruby-crowned kinglet	Corthylio calendula	(A)
Goldcrest	Regulus regulus	
Madeira firecrest	Regulus madeirensis	endemic to the island of Madeira
Common firecrest	Regulus ignicapilla	

== Wallcreeper ==
Order: Passeriformes Family: Tichodromidae

The wallcreeper is a small bird related to the nuthatch family, which has stunning crimson, grey and black plumage.

Common name	Binomial	Status
Wallcreeper	Tichodroma muraria	(A)

== Nuthatches ==
Order: Passeriformes Family: Sittidae

Nuthatches are small woodland birds. They have the unusual ability to climb down trees head first, unlike other birds which can only go upwards. Nuthatches have big heads, short tails and powerful bills and feet.

Common name	Binomial	Status
Eurasian nuthatch	Sitta europaea	

== Treecreepers ==
Order: Passeriformes Family: Certhiidae

Treecreepers are small woodland birds, brown above and white below. They have thin pointed down-curved bills, which they use to extricate insects from bark. They have stiff tail feathers, like woodpeckers, which they use to support themselves on vertical trees.

Common name	Binomial	Status
Short-toed treecreeper	Certhia brachydactyla	

== Wrens ==
Order: Passeriformes Family: Troglodytidae

The wrens are mainly small and inconspicuous except for their loud songs. These birds have short wings and thin down-turned bills. Several species often hold their tails upright. All are insectivorous.

Common name	Binomial	Status
Eurasian wren	Troglodytes troglodytes	

== Dippers ==
Order: Passeriformes Family: Cinclidae

Dippers are a group of perching birds whose habitat includes aquatic environments in the Americas, Europe and Asia. They are named for their bobbing or dipping movements.

Common name	Binomial	Status
White-throated dipper	Cinclus cinclus	

== Starlings ==
Order: Passeriformes Family: Sturnidae

Starlings are small to medium-sized passerine birds. Their flight is strong and direct and they are very gregarious. Their preferred habitat is fairly open country. They eat insects and fruit. Plumage is typically dark with a metallic sheen.

Common name	Binomial	Status
Common starling	Sturnus vulgaris	
Spotless starling	Sturnus unicolor	
Rosy starling	Pastor roseus	(A)
Common myna	Acridotheres tristis	(I)
Crested myna	Acridotheres cristatellus	(I)

== Mockingbirds and thrashers ==
Order: Passeriformes Family: Mimidae

The mimids are a family of passerine birds which includes thrashers, mockingbirds, tremblers, and the New World catbirds. These birds are notable for their songs, especially their remarkable ability to mimic a wide variety of birds and other sounds heard outdoors. The species tend towards dull greys and browns in their appearance.

Common name	Binomial	Status
Grey catbird	Dumetella carolinensis	(A) Azores only

== Thrushes and allies ==
Order: Passeriformes Family: Turdidae

The thrushes are a group of passerine birds that occur mainly in the Old World. They are plump, soft plumaged, small to medium-sized insectivores or sometimes omnivores, often feeding on the ground. Many have attractive songs.

Common name	Binomial	Status
Veery	Catharus fuscescens	(A) Azores only
Grey-cheeked thrush	Catharus minimus	(A)
Swainson's thrush	Catharus ustulatus	(A) Azores only
Hermit thrush	Catharus guttatus	(A) Azores only
Wood thrush	Hylocichla mustelina	(A) Azores and Madeiras only, near-threatened
Mistle thrush	Turdus viscivorus	
Song thrush	Turdus philomelos	
Redwing	Turdus iliacus	near-threatened
Eurasian blackbird	Turdus merula	
American robin	Turdus migratorius	(A) Azores only
Eyebrowed thrush	Turdus obscurus	(A)
Fieldfare	Turdus pilaris	
Ring ouzel	Turdus torquatus	
Black-throated thrush	Turdus atrogularis	(A)
Red-throated thrush	Turdus ruficollis	(A) Madeiras only
Dusky thrush	Turdus eunomus	(A)
Naumann's thrush	Turdus naumanni	(A) Azores only

== Old World flycatchers ==
Order: Passeriformes Family: Muscicapidae

Old World flycatchers are a large group of small passerine birds native to the Old World. They are mainly small arboreal insectivores. The appearance of these birds is highly varied, but they mostly have weak songs and harsh calls.

Common name	Binomial	Status
Spotted flycatcher	Muscicapa striata	
Rufous-tailed scrub robin	Cercotrichas galactotes	
European robin	Erithacus rubecula	
Thrush nightingale	Luscinia luscinia	(A)
Common nightingale	Luscinia megarhynchos	
Bluethroat	Luscinia svecica	
Red-flanked bluetail	Tarsiger cyanurus	(A)
Red-breasted flycatcher	Ficedula parva	(A)
European pied flycatcher	Ficedula hypoleuca	
Collared flycatcher	Ficedula albicollis	(A)
Moussier's redstart	Phoenicurus moussieri	(A)
Common redstart	Phoenicurus phoenicurus	
Black redstart	Phoenicurus ochruros	
Common rock thrush	Monticola saxatilis	
Blue rock thrush	Monticola solitarius	
Whinchat	Saxicola rubetra	
European stonechat	Saxicola rubicola	
Siberian stonechat	Saxicola maurus	(A)
Northern wheatear	Oenanthe oenanthe	
Isabelline wheatear	Oenanthe isabellina	(A)
Desert wheatear	Oenanthe deserti	(A)
Western black-eared wheatear	Oenanthe hispanica	
Black wheatear	Oenanthe leucura	
White-crowned wheatear	Oenanthe leucopyga	(A)

== Waxwings ==
Order: Passeriformes Family: Bombycillidae

The waxwings are a group of birds with soft silky plumage and unique red tips to some of the wing feathers. In the Bohemian and cedar waxwings, these tips look like sealing wax and give the group its name. These are arboreal birds of northern forests. They live on insects in summer and berries in winter.

Common name	Binomial	Status
Bohemian waxwing	Bombycilla garrulus	(A)
Cedar waxwing	Bombycilla cedrorum	(A) Azores only

== Weavers and allies ==
Order: Passeriformes Family: Ploceidae

The weavers are small passerine birds related to the finches. They are seed-eating birds with rounded conical bills. The males of many species are brightly coloured, usually in red or yellow and black, some species show variation in colour only in the breeding season.

Common name	Binomial	Status
Black-headed weaver	Ploceus melanocephalus	(I)
Yellow-crowned bishop	Euplectes afer	(I)

== Waxbills and allies ==
Order: Passeriformes Family: Estrildidae

The estrildid finches are small passerine birds of the Old World tropics and Australasia. They are gregarious and often colonial seed eaters with short thick but pointed bills. They are all similar in structure and habits, but have wide variation in plumage colours and patterns.

Common name	Binomial	Status
Scaly-breasted munia	Lonchura punctulata	(I)
Chestnut munia	Lonchura atricapilla	(I)
Common waxbill	Estrilda astrild	(I)
Red avadavat	Amandava amandava	(I)

== Accentors ==
Order: Passeriformes Family: Prunellidae

The accentors are in the only bird family, Prunellidae, which is completely endemic to the Palearctic. They are small, fairly drab species superficially similar to sparrows.

Common name	Binomial	Status
Alpine accentor	Prunella collaris	
Dunnock	Prunella modularis	

== Old World sparrows ==
Order: Passeriformes Family: Passeridae

Old World sparrows are small passerine birds. In general, sparrows tend to be small, plump, brown or grey birds with short tails and short powerful beaks. Sparrows are seed eaters, but they also consume small insects.

Common name	Binomial	Status
House sparrow	Passer domesticus	
Spanish sparrow	Passer hispaniolensis	
Tree sparrow	Passer montanus	
Rock sparrow	Petronia petronia	
White-winged snowfinch	Montifringilla nivalis	

== Wagtails and pipits ==
Order: Passeriformes Family: Motacillidae

Motacillidae is a family of small passerine birds with medium to long tails. They include the wagtails, longclaws and pipits. They are slender, ground feeding insectivores of open country.

Common name	Binomial	Status
Grey wagtail	Motacilla cinerea	
Western yellow wagtail	Motacilla flava	
Eastern yellow wagtail	Motacilla tschutschensis	(A)
Citrine wagtail	Motacilla citreola	(A)
White wagtail	Motacilla alba	
Richard's pipit	Anthus richardi	
Blyth's pipit	Anthus godlewskii	(A)
Tawny pipit	Anthus campestris	
Berthelot's pipit	Anthus berthelotii	(A) Madeiras only
Meadow pipit	Anthus pratensis	near-threatened
Tree pipit	Anthus trivialis	
Olive-backed pipit	Anthus hodgsoni	(A)
Red-throated pipit	Anthus cervinus	(A)
Water pipit	Anthus spinoletta	
Rock pipit	Anthus petrosus	
American pipit	Anthus rubescens	(A) Azores only

== Finches, euphonias, and allies ==
Order: Passeriformes Family: Fringillidae

Finches are seed-eating passerine birds, that are small to moderately large and have a strong beak, usually conical and in some species very large. All have twelve tail feathers and nine primaries. These birds have a bouncing flight with alternating bouts of flapping and gliding on closed wings, and most sing well.

Common name	Binomial	Status
Common chaffinch	Fringilla coelebs	
Brambling	Fringilla montifringilla	
Hawfinch	Coccothraustes coccothraustes	
Common rosefinch	Carpodacus erythrinus	(A)
Azores bullfinch	Pyrrhula murina	endemic to San Miguel in the Azores, vulnerable
Eurasian bullfinch	Pyrrhula pyrrhula	
Trumpeter finch	Bucanetes githagineus	(A)
European greenfinch	Chloris chloris	
Twite	Linaria flavirostris	(A)
Eurasian linnet	Linaria cannabina	
Common redpoll	Acanthis flammea	(A)
Parrot crossbill	Loxia pytyopsittacus	Madeiras only
Common crossbill	Loxia curvirostra	
Two-barred crossbill	Loxia leucoptera	(A)
European goldfinch	Carduelis carduelis	
Citril finch	Carduelis citrinella	
European serin	Serinus serinus	
Atlantic canary	Serinus canaria	Azores and Madeiras only
Eurasian siskin	Spinus spinus	

== Longspurs and snow buntings ==
Order: Passeriformes Family: Calcariidae

The Calcariidae are a group of passerine birds which had been traditionally grouped with the buntings, but differ in a number of respects and are usually found in open grassy areas.

Common name	Binomial	Status
Lapland longspur	Calcarius lapponicus	(A)
Snow bunting	Plectrophenax nivalis	

== Old World buntings ==
Order: Passeriformes Family: Emberizidae

The emberizids are a large family of passerine birds. They are seed-eating birds with distinctively shaped bills. Many emberizid species have distinctive head patterns.

Common name	Binomial	Status
Corn bunting	Emberiza calandra	
Black-headed bunting	Emberiza melanocephala	(A)
Rock bunting	Emberiza cia	
Cirl bunting	Emberiza cirlus	
Yellowhammer	Emberiza citrinella	
Ortolan bunting	Emberiza hortulana	
Pallas's bunting	Emberiza pallasi	(A)
Reed bunting	Emberiza schoeniclus	
Yellow-breasted bunting	Emberiza aureola	(A) critically endangered
Little bunting	Emberiza pusilla	(A)
Rustic bunting	Emberiza rustica	(A) vulnerable
Black-faced bunting	Emberiza spodocephala	(A)

== New World sparrows ==
Order: Passeriformes Family: Passerellidae

The New World sparrows (or American sparrows) are a large family of seed-eating passerine birds with distinctively finch-like bills.

Common name	Binomial	Status
Dark-eyed junco	Junco hyemalis	(A) Azores only
White-crowned sparrow	Zonotrichia leucophrys	(A) Azores only
White-throated sparrow	Zonotrichia albicollis	(A) Azores only
Savannah sparrow	Passerculus sandwichensis	(A) Azores only
Lincoln's sparrow	Melospiza lincolnii	(A) Azores only

== Troupials and allies ==
Order: Passeriformes Family: Icteridae

Icterids make up a family of small- to medium-sized, often colourful, New-World passerine birds. Most species have black as a predominant plumage colour, often enlivened by yellow, orange or red. The species in the family vary widely in size, shape, behaviour and colour.

Common name	Binomial	Status
Bobolink	Dolichonyx oryzivorus	(A) Azores only
Baltimore oriole	Icterus galbula	(A) Azores only

== New World warblers ==
Order: Passeriformes Family: Parulidae

The New World warblers are a group of small often colourful passerine birds restricted to the New World. Most are arboreal, but some are more terrestrial. Most members of this family are insectivores.

Common name	Binomial	Status
Ovenbird	Seiurus aurocapilla	(A) Azores only
Northern waterthrush	Parkesia noveboracensis	(A) Azores only
Golden-winged warbler	Vermivora chrysoptera	(A) Azores only, near-threatened
Blue-winged warbler	Vermivora cyanoptera	(A) Azores only
Black-and-white warbler	Mniotilta varia	(A) Azores only
Prothonotary warbler	Protonotaria citrea	(A) Azores only
Tennessee warbler	Oreothlypis peregrina	(A) Azores only
Connecticut warbler	Oporornis agilis	(A) Azores only
Mourning warbler	Geothlypis philadelphia	(A)
Common yellowthroat	Geothlypis trichas	(A)
Hooded warbler	Setophaga citrina	(A) Azores only
American redstart	Setophaga ruticilla	(A) Azores and Madeiras only
Cape May warbler	Setophaga tigrina	(A) Azores only
Northern parula	Setophaga americana	(A) Azores only
Magnolia warbler	Setophaga magnolia	(A) Azores only
Bay-breasted warbler	Setophaga castanea	(A) Azores only
Blackburnian warbler	Setophaga fusca	(A) Azores only
Yellow warbler	Setophaga petechia	(S) Azores and Madeiras only
Chestnut-sided warbler	Setophaga pensylvanica	(A) Azores only
Blackpoll warbler	Setophaga striata	(A) Azores only, near-threatened
Black-throated blue warbler	Setophaga caerulescens	(A) Azores only
Yellow-rumped warbler	Setophaga coronata	(S) Azores only
Yellow-throated warbler	Setophaga dominica	(A) Azores only
Prairie warbler	Setophaga discolor	(A) Azores only
Black-throated green warbler	Setophaga virens	(A) Azores only
Canada warbler	Cardellina canadensis	(A) Azores only
Wilson's warbler	Cardellina pusilla	(A) Azores only

== Cardinals and allies ==
Order: Passeriformes Family: Cardinalidae

The cardinals are a family of robust, seed-eating birds with strong bills. They are typically associated with open woodland. The sexes usually have distinct plumages.

Common name	Binomial	Status
Summer tanager	Piranga rubra	(A) Azores only
Scarlet tanager	Piranga olivacea	(A) Azores only
Rose-breasted grosbeak	Pheucticus ludovicianus	(A) Azores only
Blue grosbeak	Passerina caerulea	(A) Azores only
Indigo bunting	Passerina cyanea	(A) Azores only
Dickcissel	Spiza americana	(A) Azores only

== See also ==
- List of birds of Madeira
- List of birds
- Lists of birds by region
