= Isabela Moraes =

Brazilian synchronized swimmer

Personal information
- Full name: Isabela Ferraz Pereira de Moraes
- Nationality: Brazil
- Born: 5 April 1980 (age 46) São Paulo, Brazil
- Height: 1.80 m (5 ft 11 in)
- Weight: 62 kg (137 lb)

Sport
- Sport: Swimming
- Strokes: Synchronized swimming
- Club: Ohio State Buckeyes
- Updated on 18 November 2014

Isabela Moraes (born 5 April 1980) is a former synchronized swimmer from Brazil. She competed in the women's duet competition with her twin sister, Carolina Moraes, at both the 2000 and 2004 Summer Olympics. Both also competed for Ohio State University, winning 11 national championships, including the team routine title in 2000, and four straight titles in duet and trio routines between 1999 and 2002. Following the Olympics, Carolina and Isabela retired and joined Cirque du Soleil, with their first performance being as part of the 2005 World Aquatics Championships opening ceremony. Isabela has been since 2007 part of Le Rêve, a show presented in Las Vegas.
