= Podence e Santa Combinha =

- Civil parish
- Location in Portugal
- Coordinates: 41.59°N 6.92°W
- Country: Portugal
- Region: Norte
- Intermunic. comm.: Terras de Trás-os-Montes
- District: Bragança
- Municipality: Macedo de Cavaleiros

Area
  - Total: 19.46 km^{2} (7.51 sq mi)

Population (2011)
  - Total: 306
  - Density: 15.7/km^{2} (40.7/sq mi)
- Time zone: UTC+00:00 (WET)
  - Summer (DST): UTC+01:00 (WEST)

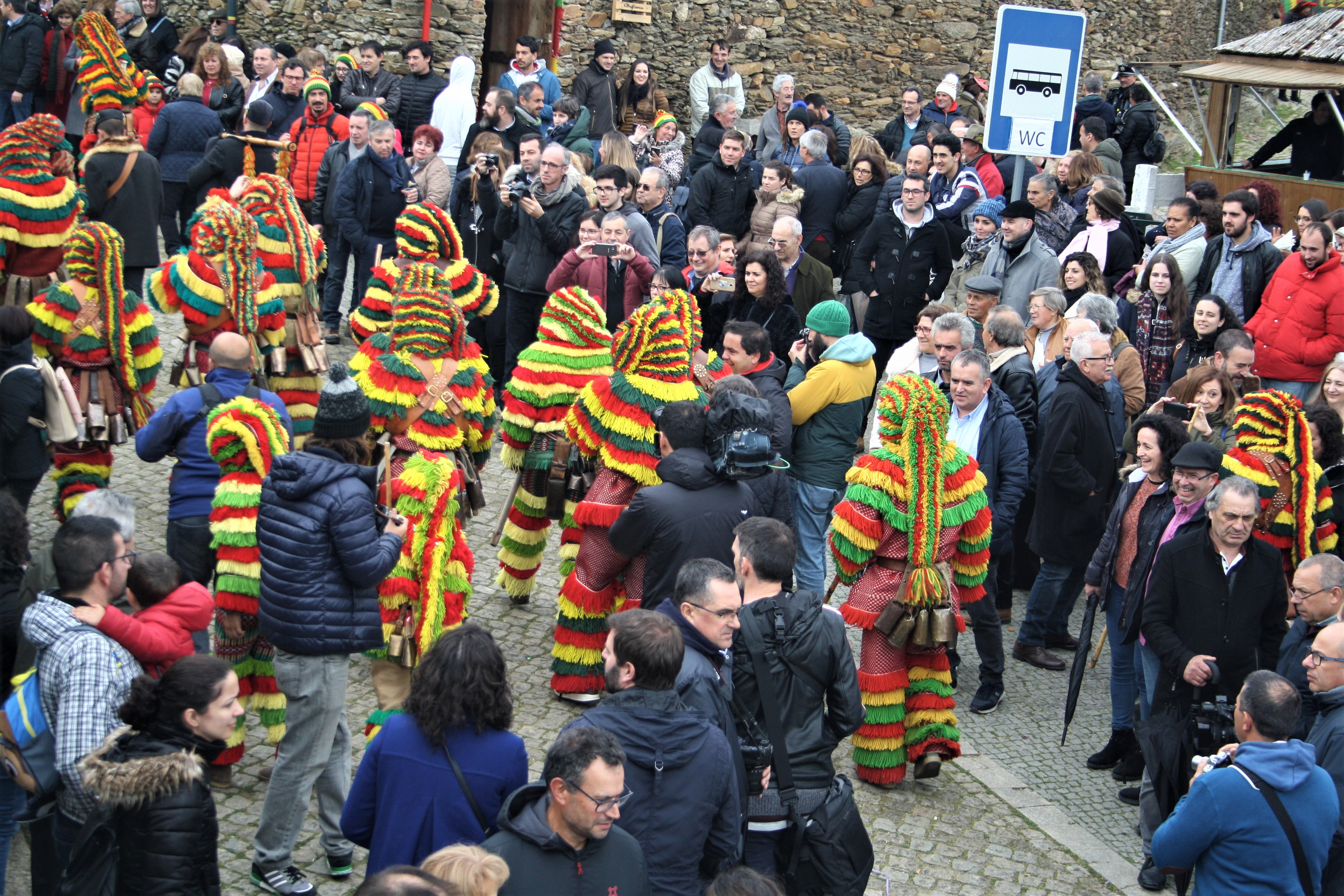
Carnival Chocalheiro in Podence

Podence e Santa Combinha is a civil parish in the municipality of Macedo de Cavaleiros, northern Portugal. It was formed in 2013 by the merger of the former parishes Podence and Santa Combinha. The population in 2011 was 306, in an area of 19.46 km².
