= Morais (Macedo de Cavaleiros) =

Portuguese parish in the municipality of Macedo de Cavaleiros

- Civil parish
- Location in Portugal
- Coordinates: 41.494°N 6.770°W
- Country: Portugal
- Region: Norte
- Intermunic. comm.: Terras de Trás-os-Montes
- District: Bragança
- Municipality: Macedo de Cavaleiros

Area
  - Total: 52.16 km^{2} (20.14 sq mi)

Population (2011)
  - Total: 644
  - Density: 12.3/km^{2} (32.0/sq mi)
- Time zone: UTC+00:00 (WET)
  - Summer (DST): UTC+01:00 (WEST)
- Website: morais.jfreguesia.com

Population Evolution in Morais 1864/2011

Morais is a Portuguese parish located in the municipality of Macedo de Cavaleiros (Bragança District). The population in 2011 was 644, in an area of 52.16 km².

== See also ==
- Morais Natura 2000 Site – Site of high geological, botanical and zoological interest
- Morais Ophiolite Complex – Metamorphic complex of oceanic and continental crust terranes in Portugal
