= Carolina Moraes =

Brazilian synchronized swimmer

Personal information
- Full name: Carolina Ferraz Pereira de Moraes
- Nationality: Brazil
- Born: 5 April 1980 (age 46) São Paulo, Brazil
- Height: 1.80 m (5 ft 11 in)
- Weight: 62 kg (137 lb)

Sport
- Sport: Swimming
- Strokes: Synchronized swimming
- Club: Ohio State Buckeyes
Medal record
Women's synchronized swimming
Representing Brazil
Bronze medal – third place	2003 Santo Domingo	Duet
Bronze medal – third place	1999 Winnipeg	Duet
- Updated on 18 November 2014

Carolina Moraes (born 5 April 1980) is a former synchronized swimmer from Brazil. She competed in the women's duet competition with her twin sister, Isabela Moraes, at both the 2000 and 2004 Summer Olympics. Both also competed for Ohio State University, winning 11 national championships, including the team routine title in 2000, and four straight titles in duet and trio routines between 1999 and 2002. Following the Olympics, Carolina and Isabela retired and joined Cirque du Soleil, with their first performance being as part of the 2005 World Aquatics Championships opening ceremony. Both have been part of the cast of Le Rêve, a show presented in Las Vegas since 2007, though Carolina is less frequent as she travels with her husband, part of Cirque du Soleil's technical team.
