= Morais ophiolite complex =

Metamorphic complex of oceanic and continental crust terranes in Portugal

The Morais ophiolite complex, also known as Morais Massif (in Portuguese, Maciço de Morais), is located in the northeast of Portugal in the Bragança District, with its main core in the Macedo de Cavaleiros Municipality. Generally speaking the Morais ophiolite complex is a set of allochthonous units, which include a full range of ultramafic rocks.

== Geological uniqueness ==
Its uniqueness lies in the fact that, within a radius of about 50 km, it's possible to see the geologic evidences of the continental collision between Laurussia and Gondwana with the consequent closure of the Rheic Ocean, to form the supercontinent of Pangaea in the Late Paleozoic (Variscan orogeny).

This Geologic Complex presents three main units:

- the terranes once belonging to the stressed edge of the Gondwana continent
- the ophiolite: a complete sequence of oceanic crust (obduction of the Rheic Ocean)
- the terranes once part of the Laurussia continent

== See also ==
- Geology of the Iberian Peninsula – Geology of Spain, Portugal, Andorra, and Gibraltar
- Morais (Macedo de Cavaleiros) – Portuguese parish in the municipality of Macedo de Cavaleiros
- Morais Natura 2000 Site – Site of high geological, botanical and zoological interest

== Sources ==
- Pereira, E., Ribeiro, A., Castro, P.F., 2000 – Carta Geológica de Portugal à escala 1:50.000. Notícia explicativa da Folha 7 - D (Macedo de Cavaleiros). Serv. Geol. de Portugal.
- Pereira, E., Ribeiro, A., Castro, P. & De Oliveira, D., 2004 – Complexo Ofiolítico Varisco do Maciço de Morais (NE de Trás-os-Montes, Portugal). In Pereira, E., Castroviejo, R. &
- Ortiz, F. (Eds.), “Complejos Ofiolíticos en Iberoamérica – Guías de Exploración para Metales Preciosos”, pp. 265–284. Proyecto XIII.1 – CYTED, Madrid, España.
- Pereira, Z., Meireles, C. e Pereira, E., 1999 – Upper Devonian Palynomorphs of NE Sector of Trás-os-Montes (Central Iberian Zone). XV Reun. Geol. Oeste Peninsular, Resumos, pp. 201–206
- Pin, C., Paqette, J.L., Ibarguchi, J.G., Zalduegui, J.F., Aller, J.R. and Cuesta, L.A., 2000 - Geochronological and geochemical constraints on the origin of the ophiolitic units from the Northwestern Iberian Massif. GALICIA 2000, Variscan-Appalachian dynamics: the building of the Upper Paleozoic basement, Abstracts, pp. 146–147.
- Rebelo, J.A. e Romano, M., 1986 - A contribution to the lithostragraphy and paleontology of the lower Paleozoic rocks of the Moncorvo region, Northeast of Portugal. Com. Serv. Geol. Portugal, T. 72, fasc.1/2, pp. 45–57.
- Ribeiro, A., 1974 - Contribution à l'étude tectonique de Trás-os-Montes Oriental. Serv. Geol. de Portugal, Mem. 24, 168 p.
- Ribeiro, A., Marcos, A., Pereira, E., Llana-Fúnez, S., Farias, P., Fernández, F.J., Fonseca, P., Chaminé, H.I. and Rosas, F., 2003 - 3-D strain distribution in the Ibero-Armorican Arc: a review. VI Cong. Nac. Geologia, Lisboa, Actas: D63-D64; Ciências da Terra (UNL), nº esp V, CD-Rom, D63-D64.
- Ribeiro, A., Pereira, E. and Dias, R., 1990 - Structure in the NW of the Iberia Peninsula (Alloctonous sequences). In: Dallmeyer, R.D. and Martinez Garcia, E. (Eds.): Pre- Mesozoic Geology of Iberia, Springer-Verlag, p. 220-236.
- Ribeiro, A., Silva, J.B., Dias, R., Pereira, E., Oliveira, J.T., Rebelo, J.A., Romão, J. e Silva, A.F., 1991 – Sardic inversion tectonics in the Centro-Iberian Zone. III Congr. Nac. Geol., Resumos, Coimbra, p. 71.
- Ribeiro, M. L, 1986 - Geologia e Petrologia da região a Sw de macedo de Cavaleiros (Trás-os-Montes). Tese, Fac.Cienc. Univ. Lisboa, 202 p.
- Rodrigues, J., Pereira, E. e Ribeiro, A., 2006 – Estrutura interna do Complexo de Mantos Parautóctones, sector de Murça-Mirandela (NE de Portugal). In: Dias, R & Araújo, A.(Eds.) Geologia de Portugal no Contexto da Ibéria. Universidade de Évora, pp. 63–84.
- Sá, A.A., 2006 – A sucessão do Ordovícico superior de Trás-os-Montes (Zona Centro-Ibérica, Portugal) e sua correlação com Valongo e Buçaco. VII Cong. Nac.de Geologia, Univ. Évora, Livro de Resumos II, pp. 621–624.
- Sousa, M. B., 1982 - Litostratigrafia e Estrutura do Complexo xisto grauváquico ante-Ordovícico - Grupo do Douro (NW de Portugal). Tese Univ. Coimbra, 222 p.
- Teixeira, C. e Pais, J., 1973 - Sobre a presença de Devónico na região de Bragança (Guadramil e Mofreita) e de Alcañices (Zamora). Bol. Soc. Geol. Portugal, 18, pp. 199–202
