= List of birds of Madeira =

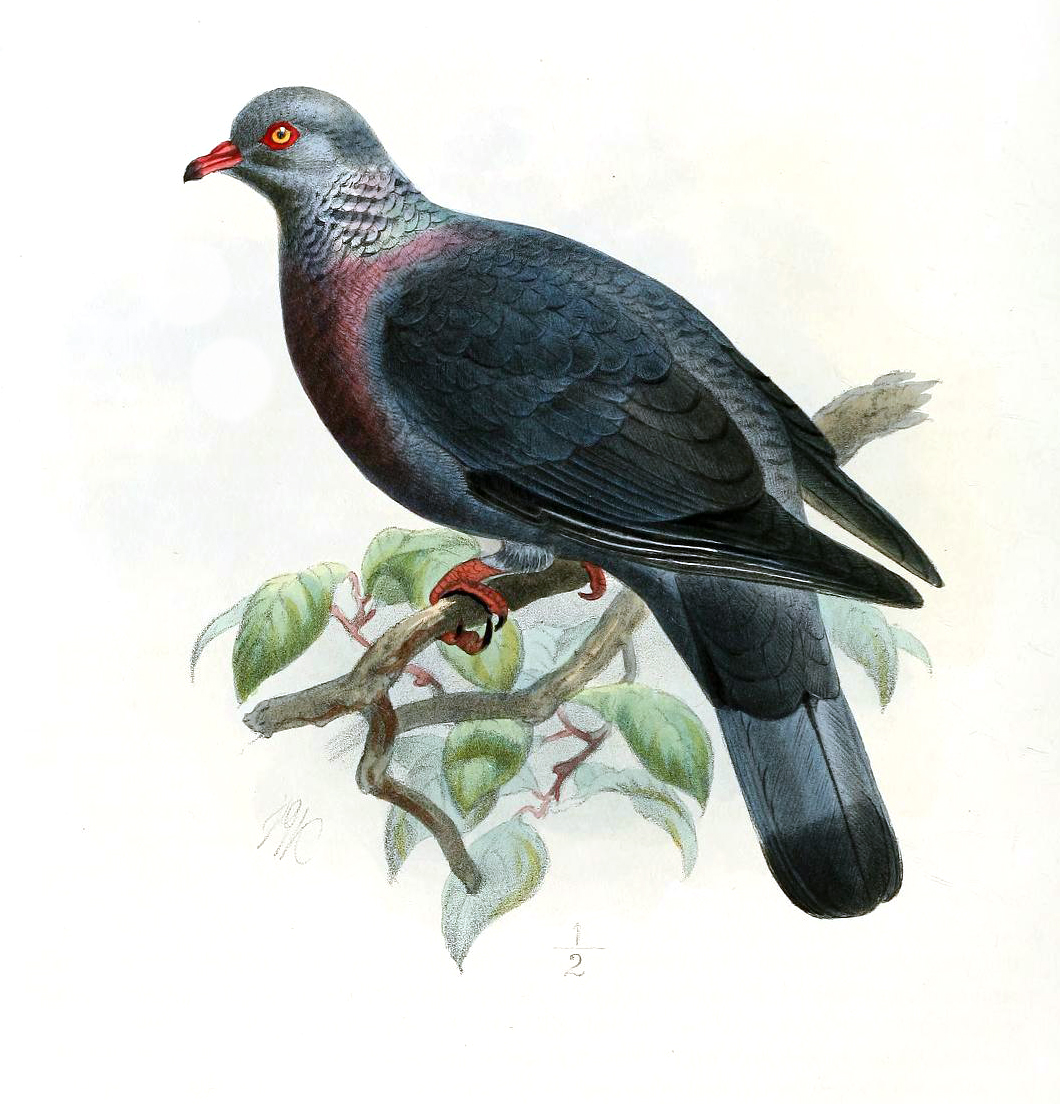
The Trocaz pigeon is endemic to Madeira.

This is a list of the bird species recorded in Madeira. The avifauna of Madeira include a total of 356 species, of which two are endemic, and 9 have been introduced by humans. Two listed species are extinct.

This list's taxonomic treatment (designation and sequence of orders, families and species) and nomenclature (common and scientific names) follow the conventions of The Clements Checklist of Birds of the World, 2022 edition. The family accounts at the beginning of each heading reflect this taxonomy, as do the species counts found in each family account. Introduced and accidental species are included in the total counts for Madeira.

The following tags have been used to highlight several categories. The commonly occurring native species do not fall into any of these categories.

- (A) Accidental - a species that rarely or accidentally occurs in Madeira
- (E) Endemic - a species endemic to Madeira
- (I) Introduced - a species introduced to Madeira as a consequence, direct or indirect, of human actions
- {Extinct} Extinct globally - a species that no longer exists

== Ducks, geese, and waterfowl ==
Order: Anseriformes Family: Anatidae

Anatidae includes the ducks and most duck-like waterfowl, such as geese and swans. These birds are adapted to an aquatic existence with webbed feet, flattened bills, and feathers that are excellent at shedding water due to an oily coating.

- Graylag goose, Anser anser (A)
- Greater white-fronted goose, Anser albifrons (A)
- Taiga bean-goose, Anser fabalis (A)
- Pink-footed goose, Anser brachyrhynchus (A)
- Brant, Branta bernicla (A)
- Barnacle goose, Branta leucopsis (A)
- Canada goose, Branta canadensis (A)
- Mute swan, Cygnus olor
- Ruddy shelduck, Tadorna ferruginea (A)
- Common shelduck, Tadorna tadorna (A)
- Muscovy duck, Cairina moschata (I)
- Wood duck, Aix sponsa (A)
- Garganey, Spatula querquedula (A)
- Blue-winged teal, Spatula discors (A)
- Northern shoveler, Spatula clypeata (A)
- Gadwall, Mareca strepera (A)
- Eurasian wigeon, Mareca penelope (A)
- American wigeon, Mareca americana
- Mallard, Anas platyrhynchos
- Northern pintail, Anas acuta (A)
- Green-winged teal, Anas crecca
- Marbled teal, Marmaronetta angustirostris (A)
- Common pochard, Aythya ferina (A)
- Ring-necked duck, Aythya collaris (A)
- Tufted duck, Aythya fuligula (A)
- Greater scaup, Aythya marila (A)
- Lesser scaup, Aythya affinis (A)
- Surf scoter, Melanitta perspicillata (A)
- Common scoter, Melanitta nigra (A)
- Long-tailed duck, Clangula hyemalis (A)
- Bufflehead, Bucephala albeola (A)
- Common goldeneye, Bucephala clangula (A)
- Red-breasted merganser, Mergus serrator (A)

== Pheasants, grouse, and allies ==
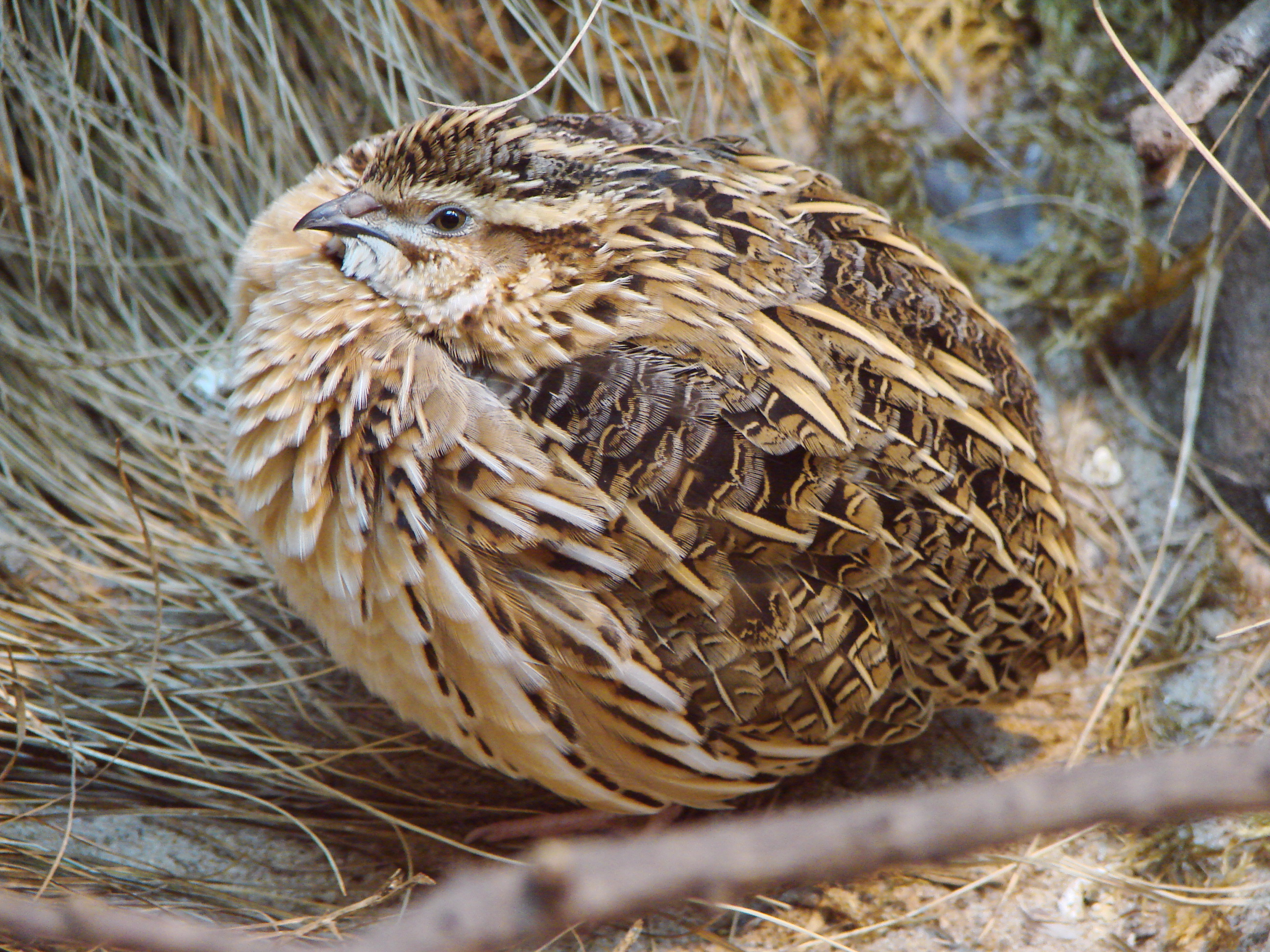
Common quail

Order: Galliformes Family: Phasianidae

The Phasianidae are a family of terrestrial birds which consists of quails, partridges, snowcocks, francolins, spurfowls, tragopans, monals, pheasants, peafowls and jungle fowls. In general, they are plump (although they vary in size) and have broad, relatively short wings.

- Red-legged partridge, Alectoris rufa (I)
- Common quail, Coturnix coturnix
- Indian peafowl, Pavo cristatus (I)
- Gray partridge, Perdix perdix (A)
- Ring-necked pheasant, Phasianus colchicus (I)

== Grebes ==
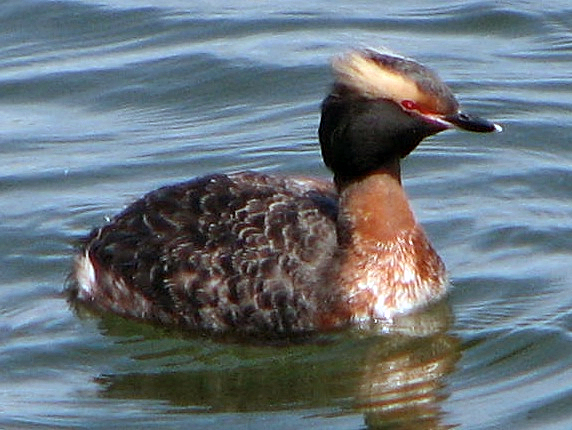
Horned grebe

Order: Podicipediformes Family: Podicipedidae

Grebes are small to medium-large freshwater diving birds. They have lobed toes and are excellent swimmers and divers. However, they have their feet placed far back on the body, making them quite ungainly on land.

- Horned grebe, Podiceps auritus (A)
- Eared grebe, Podiceps nigricollis (A)
- Pied-billed grebe, Podilymbus podiceps (A)
- Little grebe, Tachybaptus ruficollis (A)

== Pigeons and doves ==
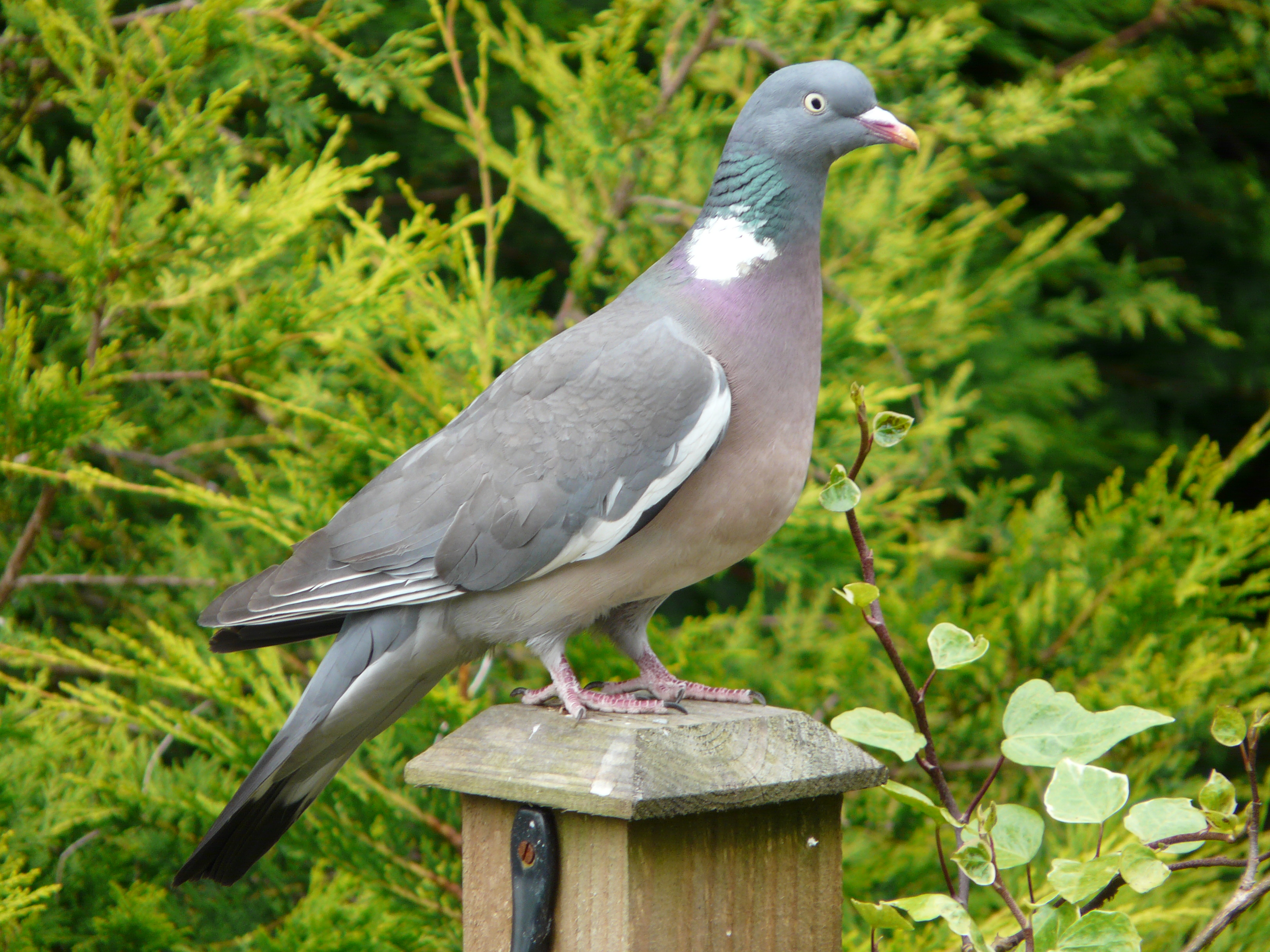
Common wood-pigeon

Order: Columbiformes Family: Columbidae

Pigeons and doves are stout-bodied birds with short necks and short slender bills with a fleshy cere. The Madeiran wood pigeon (Columba palumbus maderensis), an endemic subspecies, is extinct.

- Rock pigeon, Columba livia
- Stock dove, Columba oenas (A)
- Common wood-pigeon, Columba palumbus (A)
- Trocaz pigeon, Columba trocaz (E)
- Eurasian collared-dove, Streptopelia decaocto (I)
- European turtle-dove, Streptopelia turtur

== Bustards ==
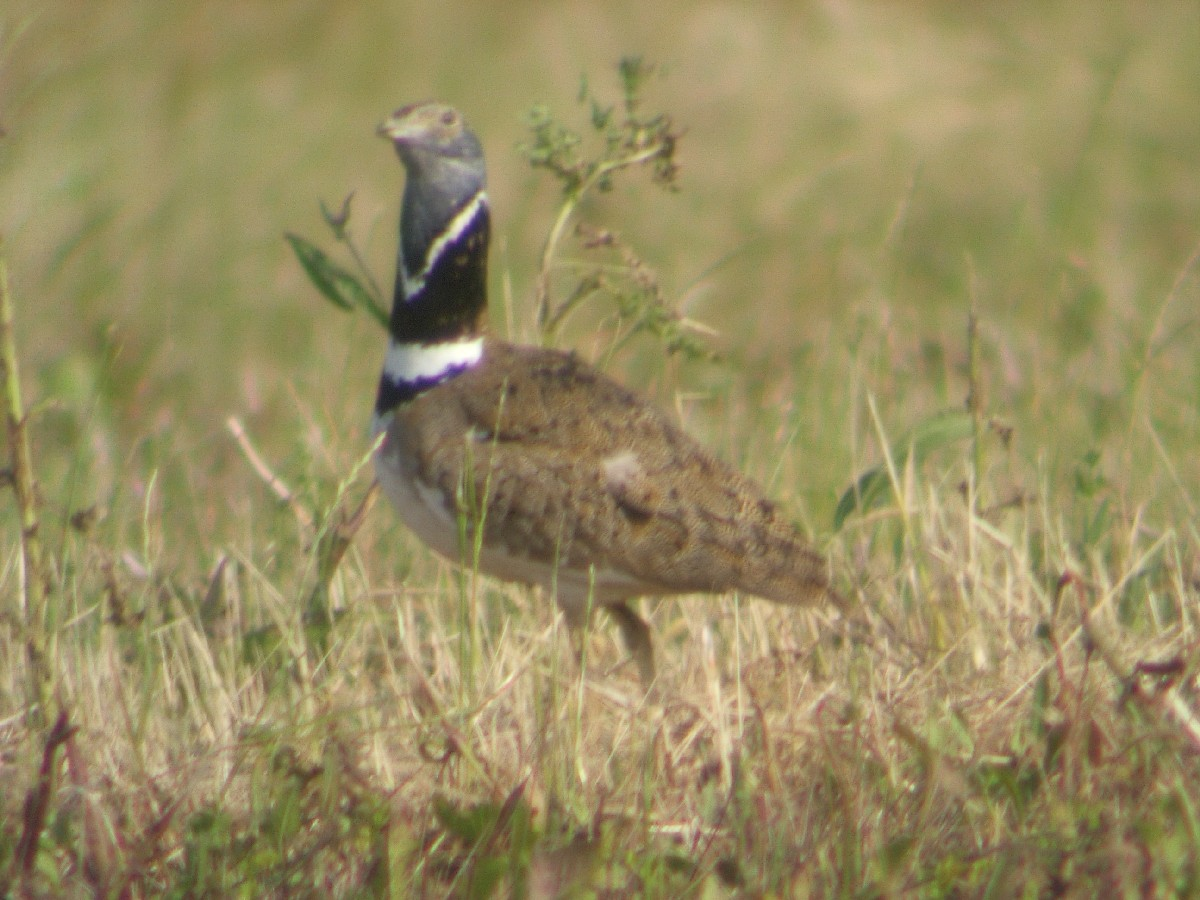
Little bustard

Order: Otidiformes Family: Otididae

Bustards are large terrestrial birds mainly associated with dry open country and steppes in the Old World. They are omnivorous and nest on the ground. They walk steadily on strong legs and big toes, pecking for food as they go. They have long broad wings with "fingered" wingtips and striking patterns in flight. Many have interesting mating displays.

- Little bustard, Tetrax tetrax (A)

== Cuckoos ==
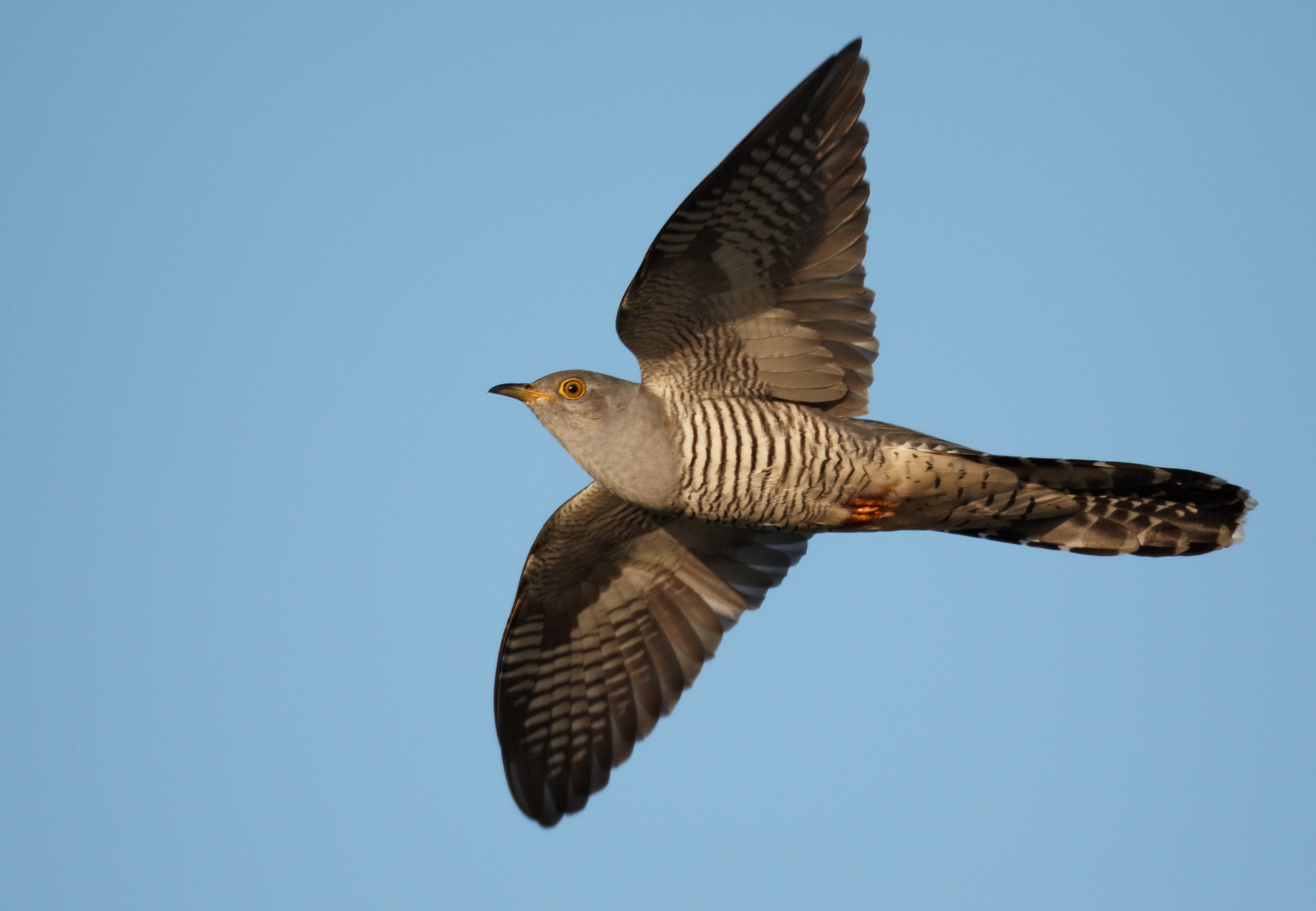
Common cuckoo

Order: Cuculiformes Family: Cuculidae

The family Cuculidae includes cuckoos, roadrunners and anis. These birds are of variable size with slender bodies, long tails and strong legs. The Old World cuckoos are brood parasites.

- Great spotted cuckoo, Clamator glandarius (A)
- Common cuckoo, Cuculus canorus (A)

== Nightjars and allies ==
Order: Caprimulgiformes Family: Caprimulgidae

Nightjars are medium-sized nocturnal birds that usually nest on the ground. They have long wings, short legs and very short bills. Most have small feet, of little use for walking, and long pointed wings. Their soft plumage is camouflaged to resemble bark or leaves.

- Eurasian nightjar, Caprimulgus europaeus (A)
- Red-necked nightjar, Caprimulgus ruficollis (A)
- Common nighthawk, Chordeiles minor (A)

== Swifts ==
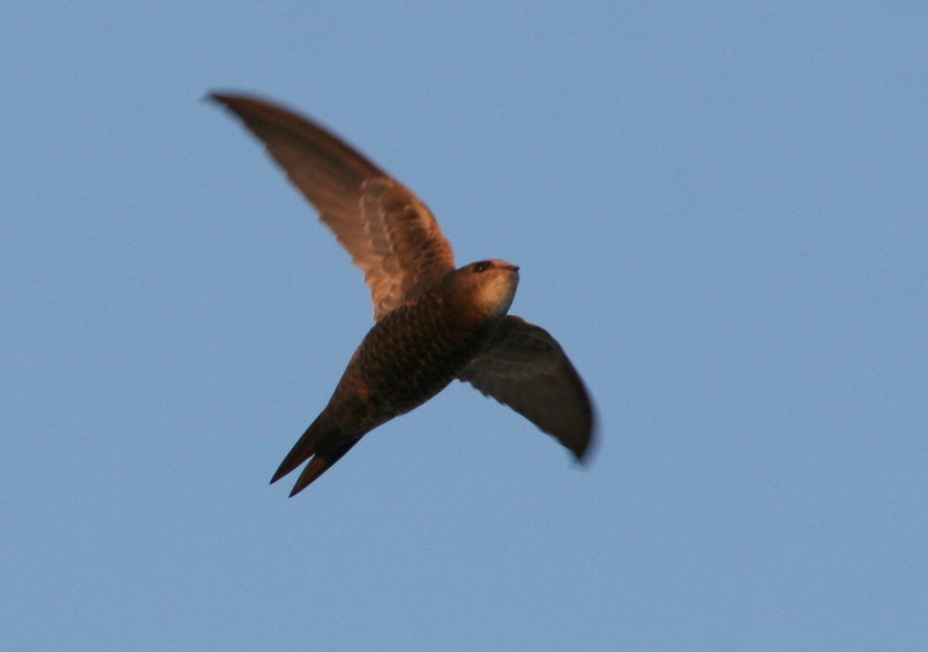
Pallid swift

Order: Caprimulgiformes Family: Apodidae

Swifts are small birds which spend the majority of their lives flying. These birds have very short legs and never settle voluntarily on the ground, perching instead only on vertical surfaces. Many swifts have long swept-back wings which resemble a crescent or boomerang.

- Little swift, Apus affinis (A)
- Common swift, Apus apus
- White-rumped swift, Apus caffer (A)
- Alpine swift, Apus melba (A)
- Pallid swift, Apus pallidus
- Plain swift, Apus unicolor
- Chimney swift, Chaetura pelagica (A)

== Rails, gallinules, and coots ==
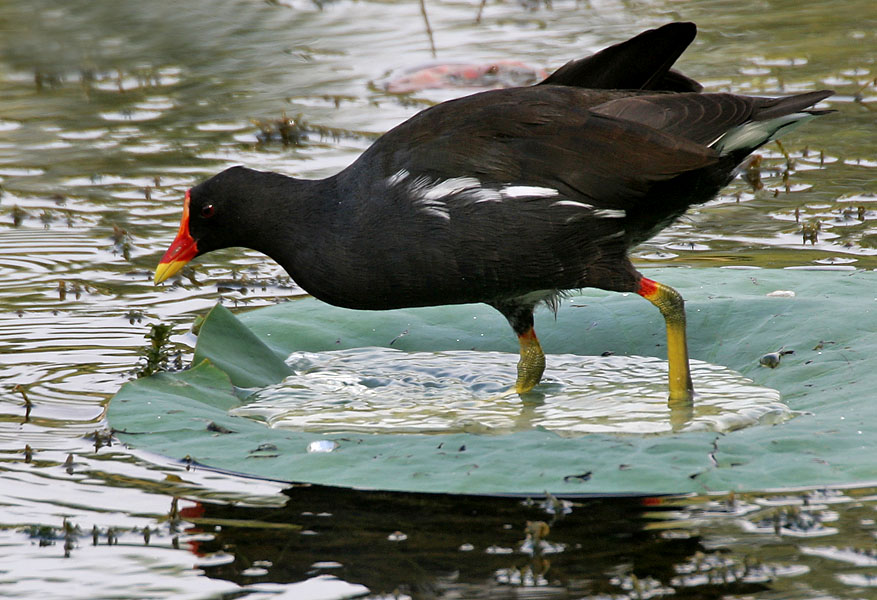
Eurasian moorhen

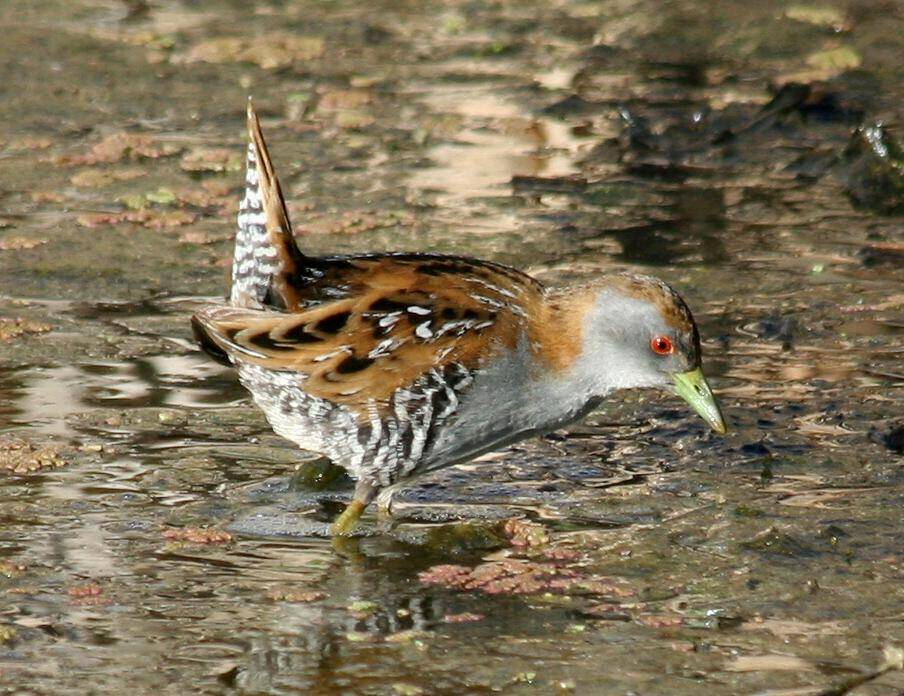
Baillon's crake

Order: Gruiformes Family: Rallidae

Rallidae is a large family of small to medium-sized birds which includes the rails, crakes, coots and gallinules. Typically they inhabit dense vegetation in damp environments near lakes, swamps or rivers. In general they are shy and secretive birds, making them difficult to observe. Most species have strong legs and long toes which are well adapted to soft uneven surfaces. They tend to have short, rounded wings and to be weak fliers.

- Corn crake, Crex crex (A)
- American coot, Fulica americana (A)
- Eurasian coot, Fulica atra
- Lesser moorhen, Gallinula angulata (A)
- Eurasian moorhen, Gallinula chloropus
- Allen's gallinule, Porphyrio alleni (A)
- Purple gallinule, Porphyrio martinicus (A)
- Western swamphen, Porphyrio porphyrio (A)
- Sora, Porzana carolina (A)
- Spotted crake, Porzana porzana (A)
- Water rail, Rallus aquaticus (A)
- Little crake, Zapornia parva (A)
- Baillon's crake, Zapornia pusilla (A)

== Cranes ==
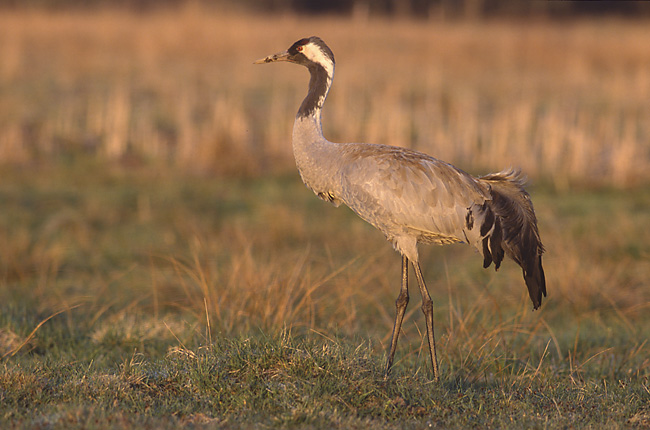
Common crane

Order: Gruiformes Family: Gruidae

Cranes (Gruidae) are large, long-legged and long-necked birds. Unlike the similar-looking but unrelated herons, cranes fly with necks outstretched, not pulled back. Most have elaborate and noisy courting displays or "dances".

- Common crane, Grus grus (A)

== Thick-knees ==
Order: Charadriiformes Family: Burhinidae

The thick-knees (Burhinidae) are a group of largely tropical waders in the family Burhinidae. They are found worldwide within the tropical zone, with some species also breeding in temperate Europe and Australia. They are medium to large waders with strong black or yellow-black bills, large yellow eyes and cryptic plumage. Despite being classed as waders, most species have a preference for arid or semi-arid habitats.

- Eurasian thick-knee, Burhinus oedicnemus (A)

== Stilts and avocets ==
Order: Charadriiformes Family: Recurvirostridae

Recurvirostridae is a family of large wading birds, which includes the avocets and stilts. The avocets have long legs and long up-curved bills. The stilts have extremely long legs and long, thin, straight bills.

- Black-winged stilt, Himantopus himantopus (A)
- Pied avocet, Recurvirostra avosetta (A)

== Oystercatchers ==
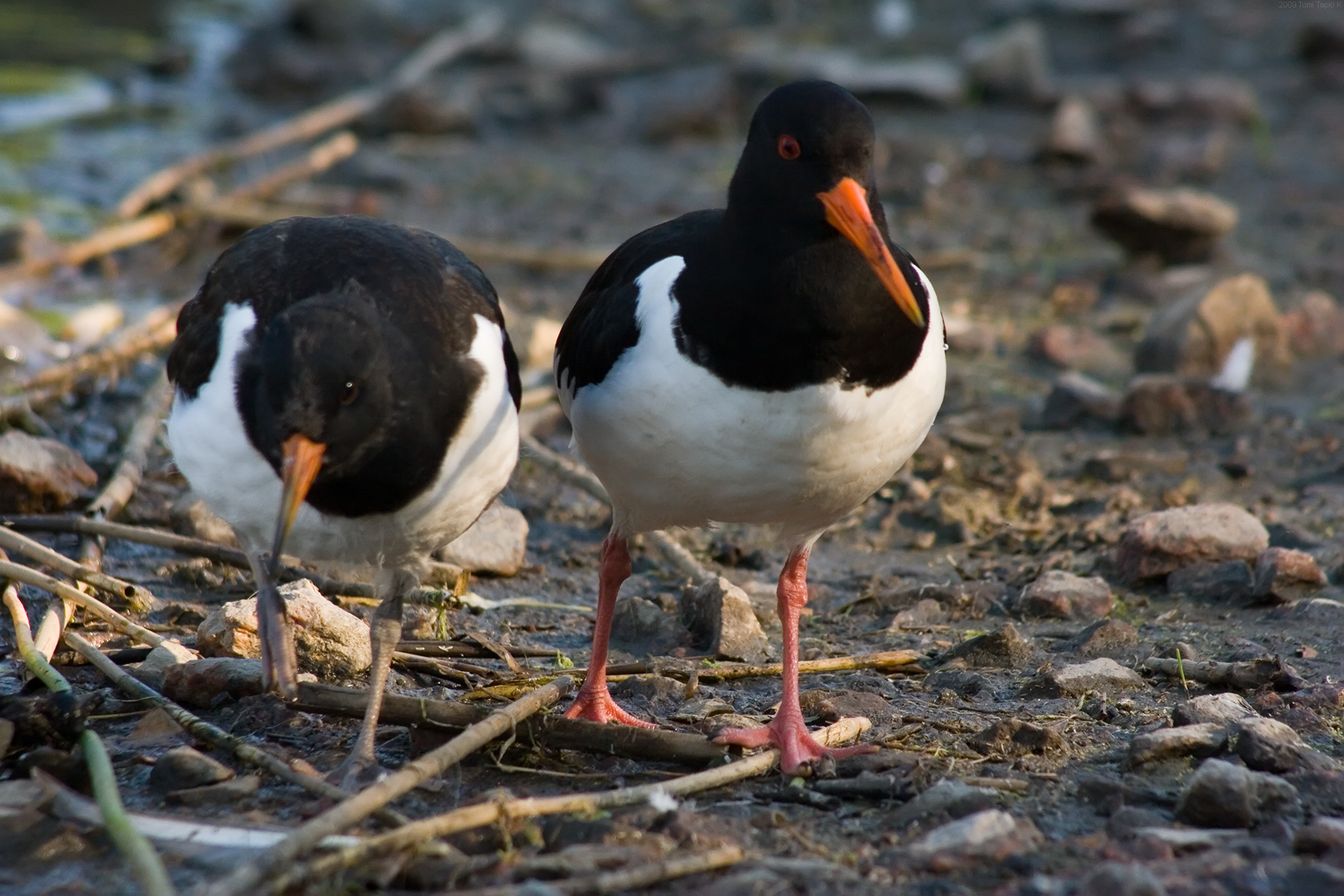
Eurasian oystercatcher

Order: Charadriiformes Family: Haematopodidae

The oystercatchers (Haematopodidae) are large and noisy plover-like birds, with strong bills used for smashing or prising open molluscs.

- Canarian oystercatcher, Haematopus meadewaldoi (Extinct)
- Eurasian oystercatcher, Haematopus ostralegus (A)

== Plovers and lapwings ==
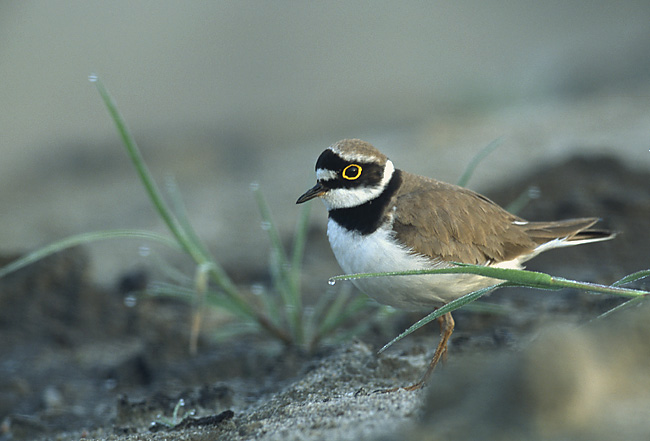
Little ringed plover

Order: Charadriiformes Family: Charadriidae

The family Charadriidae includes the plovers, dotterels and lapwings. They are small to medium-sized birds with compact bodies, short, thick necks and long, usually pointed, wings. They are found in open country worldwide, mostly in habitats near water.

- Kentish plover, Charadrius alexandrinus
- Little ringed plover, Charadrius dubius
- Common ringed plover, Charadrius hiaticula (A)
- Eurasian dotterel, Charadrius morinellus (A)
- Killdeer, Charadrius vociferus (A)
- European golden-plover, Pluvialis apricaria (A)
- American golden-plover, Pluvialis dominica (A)
- Pacific golden-plover, Pluvialis fulva (A)
- Black-bellied plover, Pluvialis squatarola (A)
- Northern lapwing, Vanellus vanellus (A)

== Sandpipers and allies ==
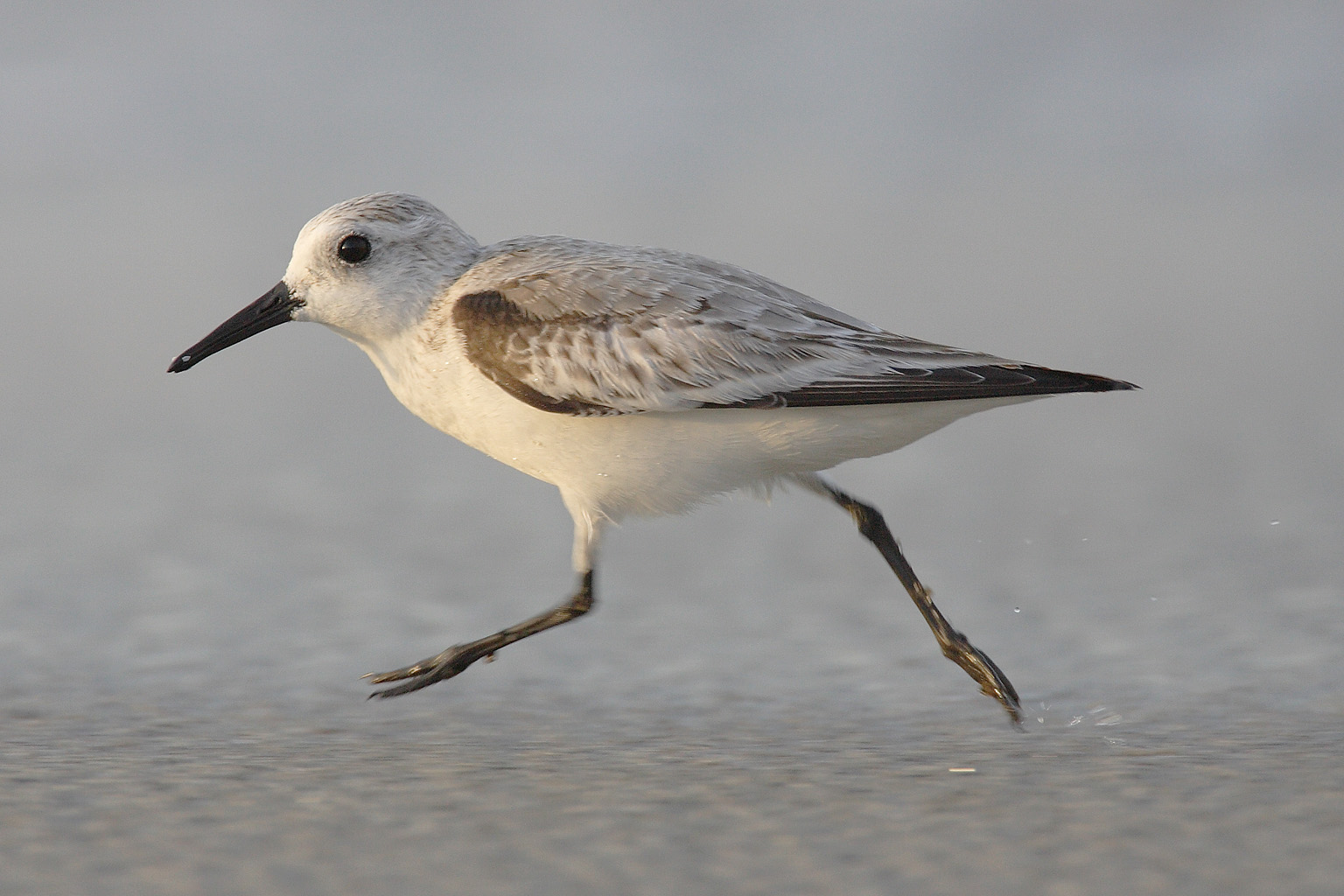
Sanderling

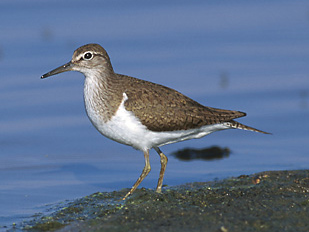
Common sandpiper

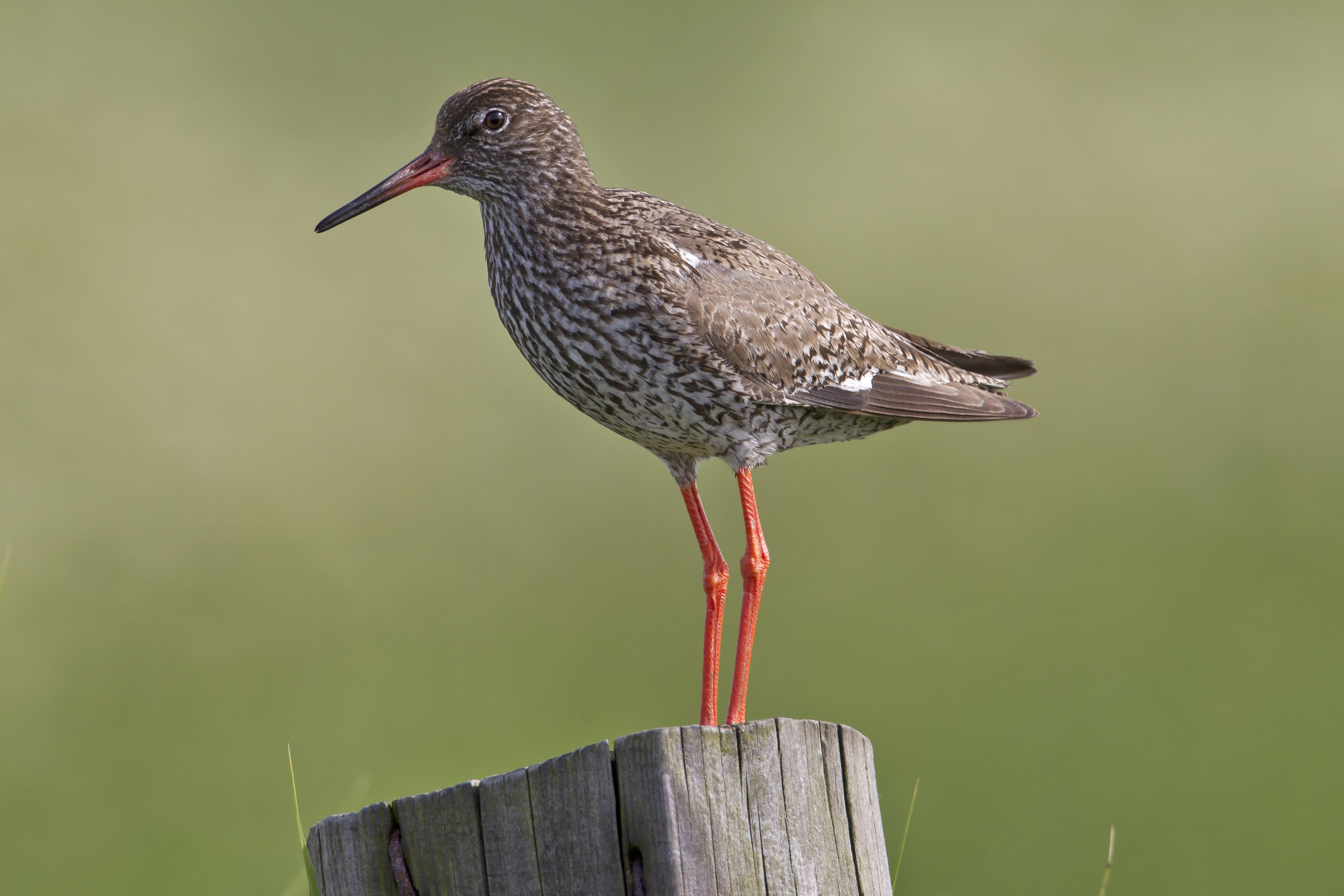
Common redshank

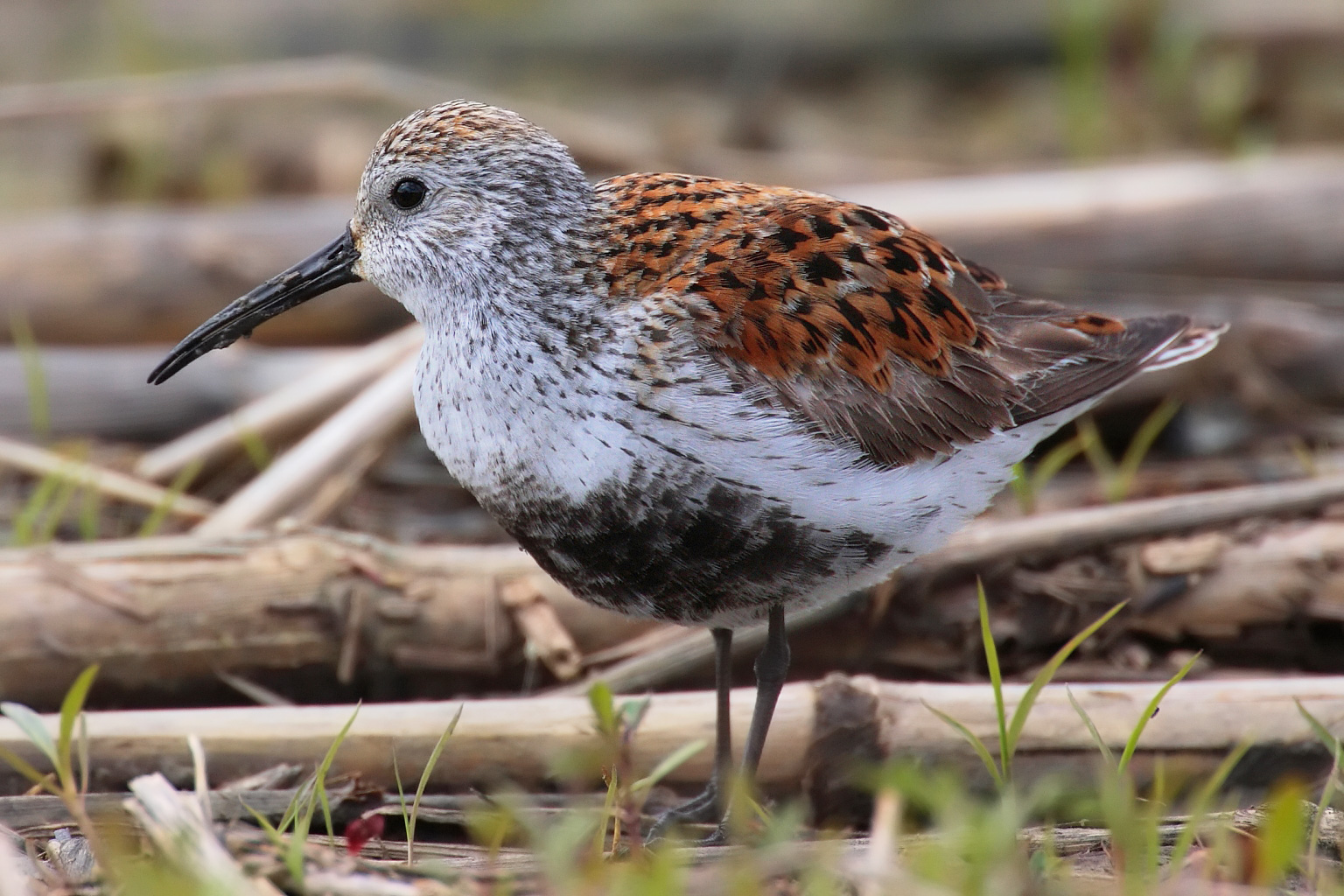
Dunlin

Order: Charadriiformes Family: Scolopacidae

Scolopacidae is a large diverse family of small to medium-sized shorebirds including the sandpipers, curlews, godwits, shanks, tattlers, woodcocks, snipes, dowitchers and phalaropes. The majority of these species eat small invertebrates picked out of the mud or soil. Variation in length of legs and bills enables multiple species to feed in the same habitat, particularly on the coast, without direct competition for food.

- Upland sandpiper, Bartramia longicauda (A)
- Whimbrel, Numenius phaeopus (A)
- Eurasian curlew, Numenius arquata (A)
- Bar-tailed godwit, Limosa lapponica (A)
- Black-tailed godwit, Limosa limosa (A)
- Ruddy turnstone, Arenaria interpres
- Red knot, Calidris canutus
- Ruff, Calidris pugnax (A)
- Sharp-tailed sandpiper, Calidris acuminata (A)
- Curlew sandpiper, Calidris ferruginea (A)
- Temminck's stint, Calidris temminckii (A)
- Sanderling, Calidris alba
- Dunlin, Calidris alpina
- Purple sandpiper, Calidris maritima (A)
- Baird's sandpiper, Calidris bairdii (A)
- Little stint, Calidris minuta (A)
- White-rumped sandpiper, Calidris fuscicollis (A)
- Buff-breasted sandpiper, Calidris subruficollis (A)
- Pectoral sandpiper, Calidris melanotos (A)
- Semipalmated sandpiper, Calidris pusilla (A)
- Western sandpiper, Calidris mauri (A)
- Jack snipe, Lymnocryptes minimus (A)
- Eurasian woodcock, Scolopax rusticola
- Common snipe, Gallinago gallinago
- Wilson's snipe, Gallinago delicata (A)
- Wilson's phalarope, Phalaropus tricolor (A)
- Red-necked phalarope, Phalaropus lobatus (A)
- Red phalarope, Phalaropus fulicarius (A)
- Common sandpiper, Actitis hypoleucos
- Spotted sandpiper, Actitis macularius (A)
- Green sandpiper, Tringa ochropus (A)
- Solitary sandpiper, Tringa solitaria (A)
- Spotted redshank, Tringa erythropus (A)
- Greater yellowlegs, Tringa melanoleuca (A)
- Common greenshank, Tringa nebularia (A)
- Lesser yellowlegs, Tringa flavipes (A)
- Marsh sandpiper, Tringa stagnatilis (A)
- Wood sandpiper, Tringa glareola (A)
- Common redshank, Tringa totanus (A)

== Pratincoles and coursers ==
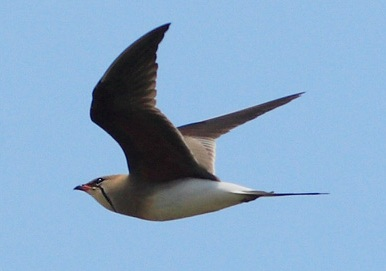
Collared pratincole

Order: Charadriiformes Family: Glareolidae

Glareolidae is a family of wading birds comprising the pratincoles, which have short legs, long pointed wings and long forked tails, and the coursers, which have long legs, short wings and long, pointed bills which curve downwards.

- Cream-colored courser, Cursorius cursor (A)
- Collared pratincole, Glareola pratincola (A)

== Skuas and jaegers ==
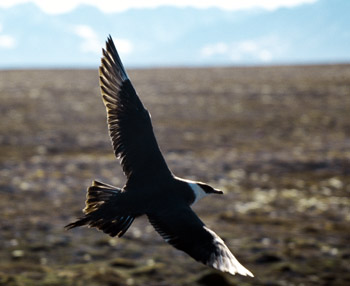
Parasitic jaeger

Order: Charadriiformes Family: Stercorariidae

The family Stercorariidae are, in general, medium to large sea birds, typically with grey or brown plumage, often with white markings on the wings. They nest on the ground in temperate and arctic regions and are long-distance migrants.

- Long-tailed jaeger, Stercorarius longicaudus
- South polar skua, Stercorarius maccormicki (A)
- Parasitic jaeger, Stercorarius parasiticus
- Pomarine jaeger, Stercorarius pomarinus
- Great skua, Stercorarius skua

== Auks, murres, and puffins ==
Order: Charadriiformes Family: Alcidae

Auks (Alcidae) are a family of seabirds which are superficially similar to penguins with their black-and-white colours, their upright posture and some of their habits but which are able to fly.

- Dovekie, Alle alle (A)
- Atlantic puffin, Fratercula arctica (A)

== Gulls, terns, and skimmers ==
Order: Charadriiformes Family: Laridae

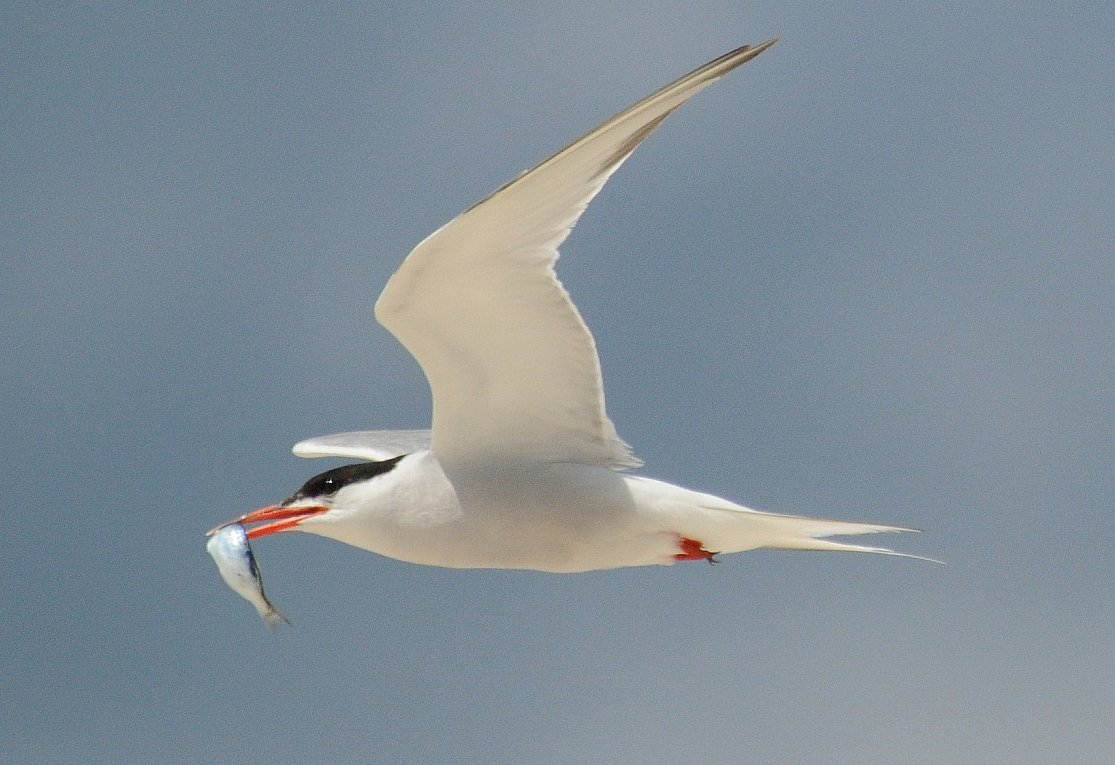
Common tern

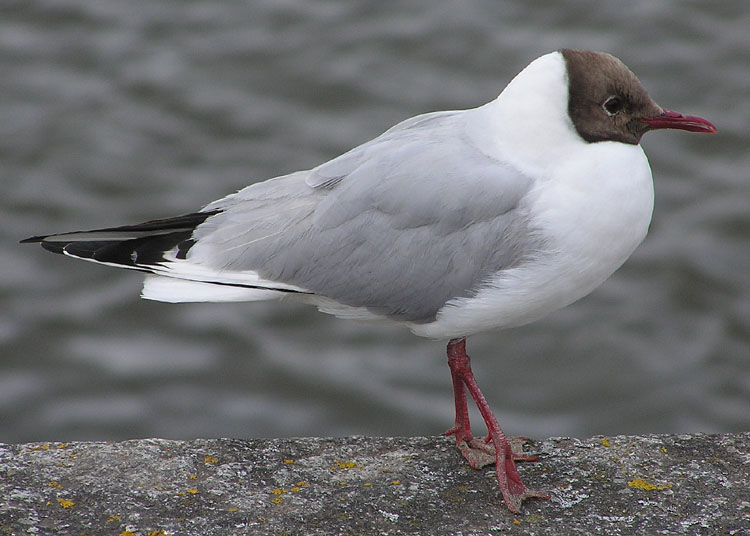
Black-headed gull

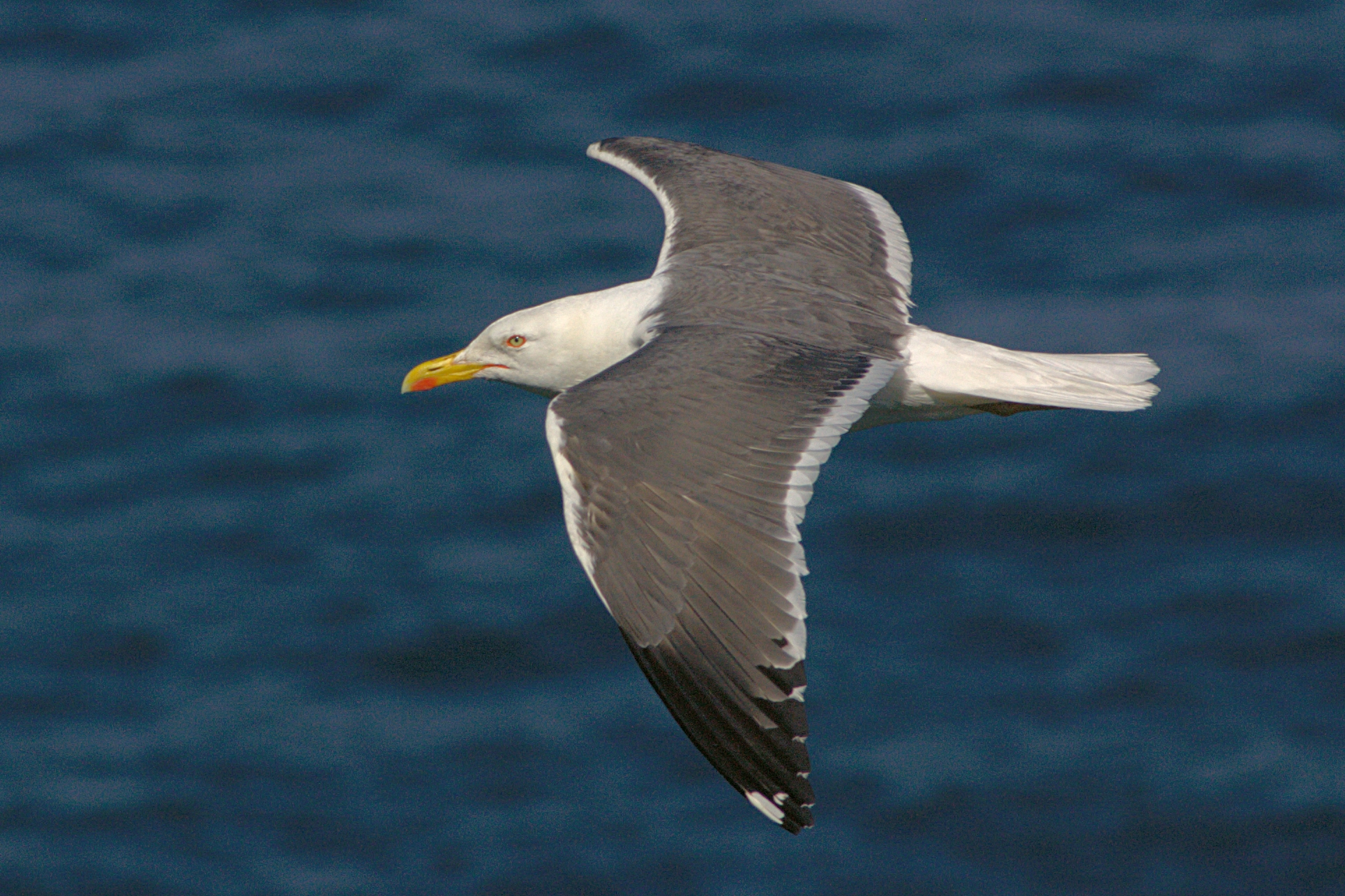
Lesser black-backed gull

Laridae is a family of medium to large seabirds and includes gulls, terns, and skimmers. Gulls are typically grey or white, often with black markings on the head or wings. They have stout, longish bills and webbed feet. Terns are a group of generally medium to large seabirds typically with grey or white plumage, often with black markings on the head. Most terns hunt fish by diving but some pick insects off the surface of fresh water. Terns are generally long-lived birds, with several species known to live in excess of 30 years.

- Black-legged kittiwake, Rissa tridactyla (A)
- Sabine's gull, Xema sabini (A)
- Slender-billed gull, Chroicocephalus genei (A)
- Bonaparte's gull, Chroicocephalus philadelphia (A)
- Black-headed gull, Chroicocephalus ridibundus
- Little gull, Hydrocoloeus minutus (A)
- Laughing gull, Leucophaeus atricilla (A)
- Franklin's gull, Leucophaeus pipixcan (A)
- Mediterranean gull, Ichthyaetus melanocephalus
- Pallas's gull, Ichthyaetus ichthyaetus (A)
- Common gull, Larus canus (A)
- Short-billed gull, Larus brachyrhynchus (A)
- Ring-billed gull, Larus delawarensis (A)
- Herring gull, Larus argentatus (A)
- Yellow-legged gull, Larus michahellis
- Iceland gull, Larus glaucoides (A)
- Lesser black-backed gull, Larus fuscus
- Glaucous gull, Larus hyperboreus (A)
- Great black-backed gull, Larus marinus (A)
- Sooty tern, Onychoprion fuscatus (A)
- Little tern, Sternula albifrons (A)
- Gull-billed tern, Gelochelidon nilotica (A)
- Caspian tern, Hydroprogne caspia (A)
- Black tern, Chlidonias niger (A)
- White-winged tern, Chlidonias leucopterus (A)
- Whiskered tern, Chlidonias hybrida (A)
- Roseate tern, Sterna dougallii
- Common tern, Sterna hirundo
- Arctic tern, Sterna paradisaea
- Sandwich tern, Thalasseus sandvicensis (A)

== Tropicbirds ==
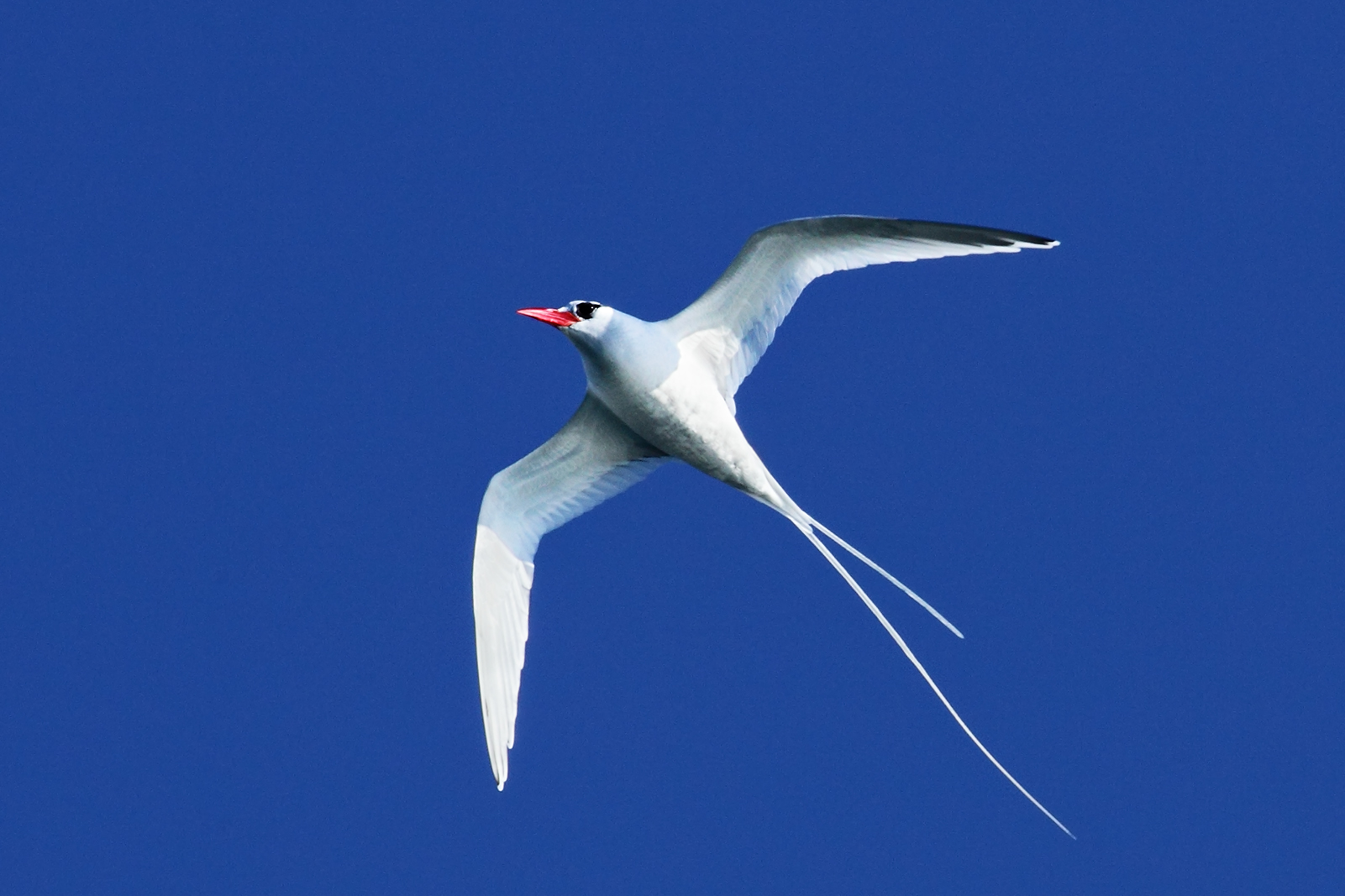
Red-billed tropicbird

Order: Phaethontiformes Family: Phaethontidae

Tropicbirds are slender white birds of tropical oceans, with exceptionally long central tail feathers. Their heads and long wings have black markings.

- Red-billed tropicbird, Phaethon aethereus (A)

== Loons ==
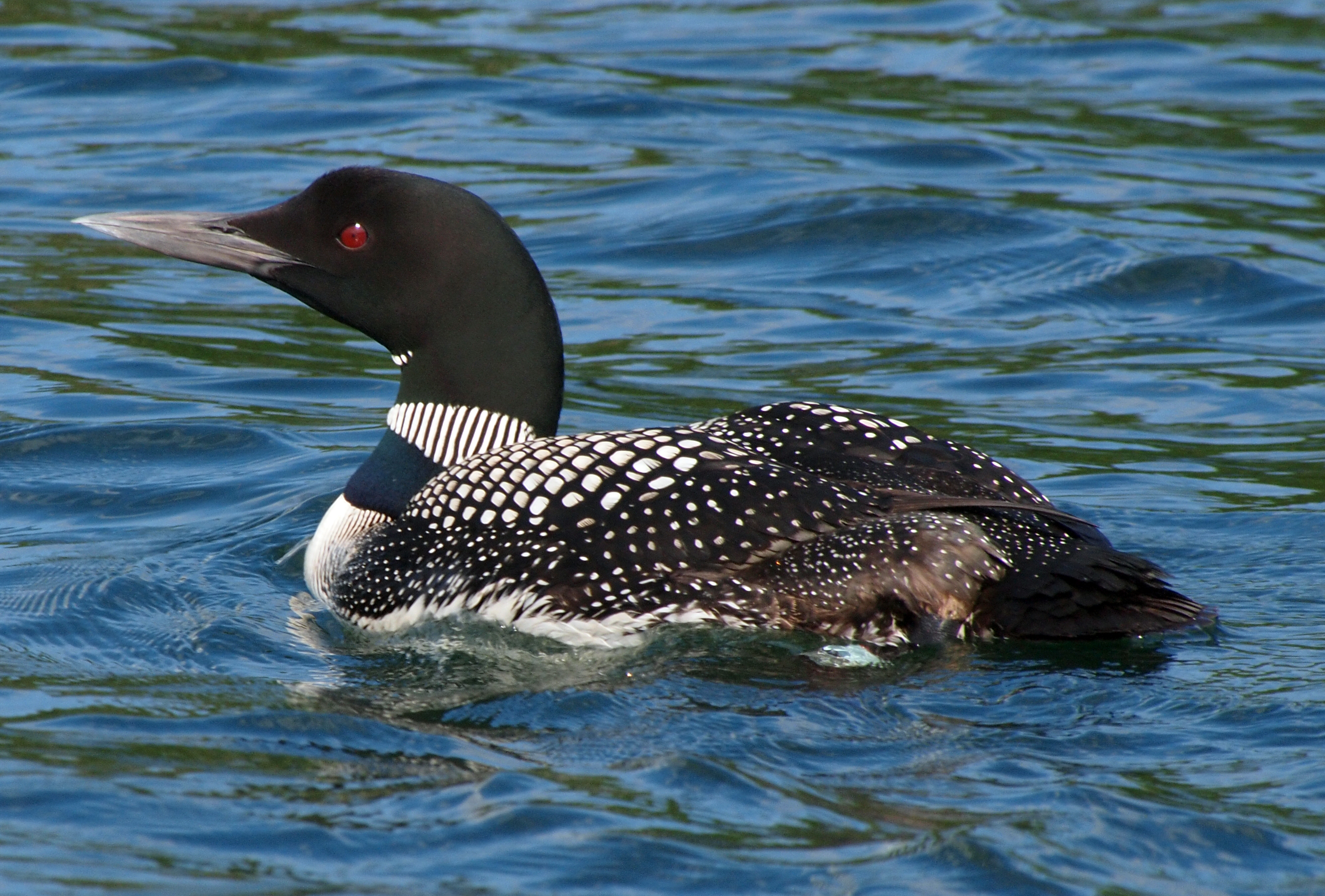
Common loon

Order: Galliformes Family: Gaviidae

The loons or divers are a group of aquatic birds found in many parts of North America and northern Eurasia (Europe, Asia and debatably Africa). All living species of loons are members of the genus (Gavia), family (Gaviidae) and order (Gaviiformes).

- Common loon, Gavia immer

== Southern storm-petrels ==
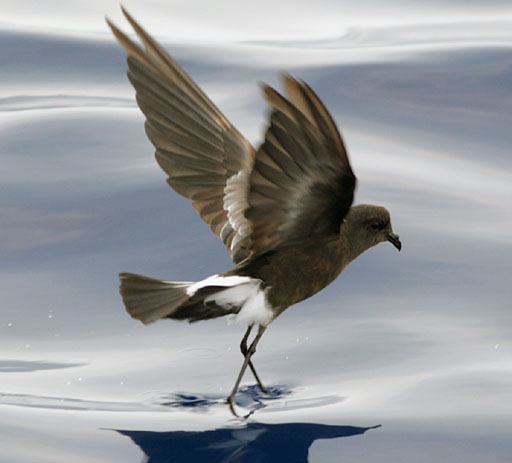
Wilson's storm-petrel

Order: Procellariiformes Family: Oceanitidae

The southern storm-petrels are relatives of the petrels and are the smallest seabirds. They feed on planktonic crustaceans and small fish picked from the surface, typically while hovering. The flight is fluttering and sometimes bat-like.

- Black-bellied storm-petrel, Fregetta tropica (A)
- Wilson's storm-petrel, Oceanites oceanicus
- White-faced storm-petrel, Pelagodroma marina

== Northern storm-petrels ==
Order: Procellariiformes Family: Hydrobatidae

Though the members of this family are similar in many respects to the southern storm-petrels, including their general appearance and habits, there are enough genetic differences to warrant their placement in a separate family.

- Band-rumped storm-petrel, Hydrobates castro
- Leach's storm-petrel, Hydrobates leucorhous (A)
- Swinhoe's storm-petrel, Hydrobates monorhis (A)
- European storm-petrel, Hydrobates pelagicus

== Shearwaters and petrels ==
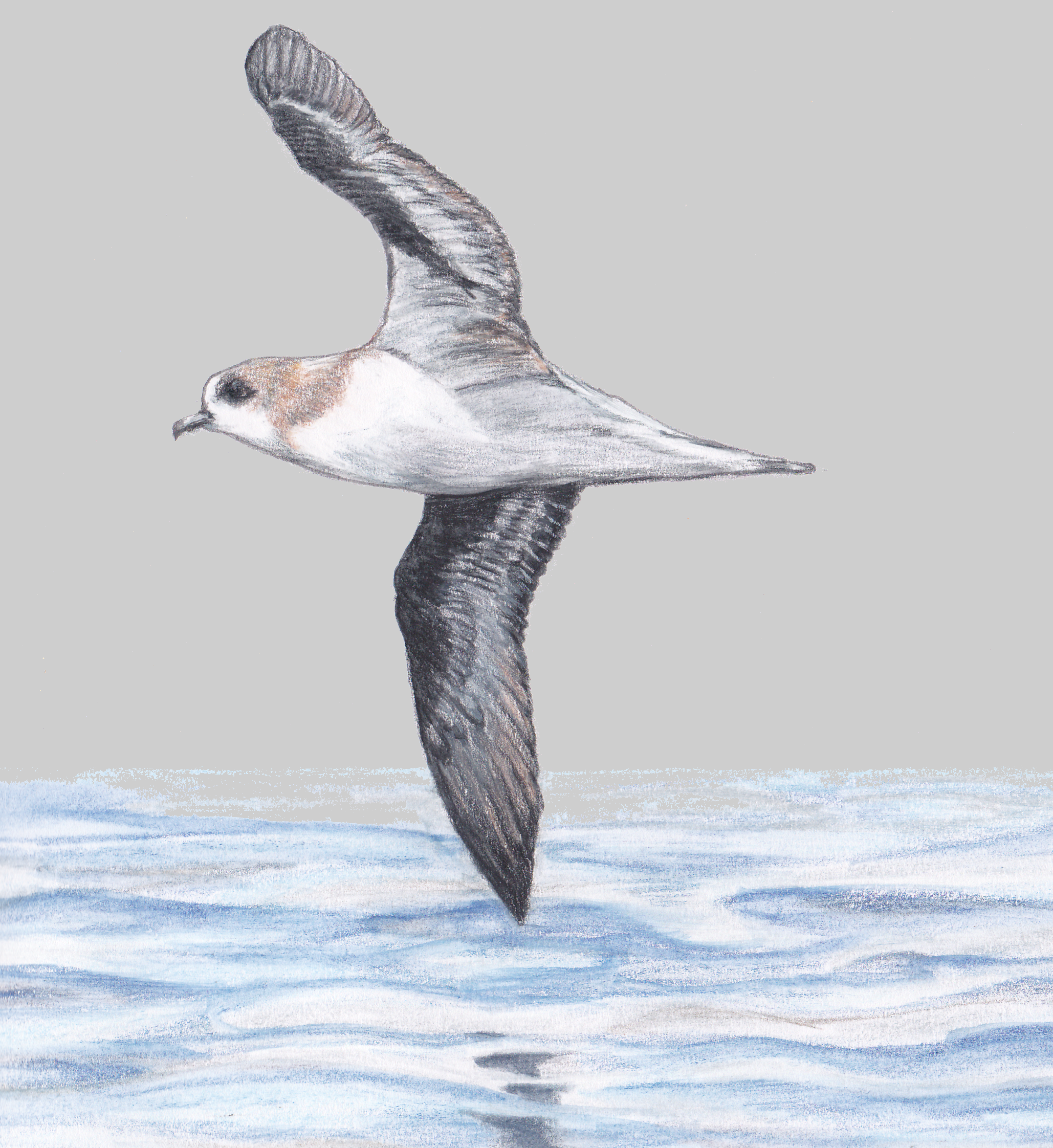
Zino's petrel or Freira is an endangered species, and a breeding endemic to Madeira

Order: Procellariiformes Family: Procellariidae

The procellariids are the main group of medium-sized "true petrels", characterised by united nostrils with medium septum and a long outer functional primary.

- Bulwer's petrel, Bulweria bulwerii
- Northern fulmar, Fulmarus glacialis (A)
- Zino's petrel, Pterodroma madeira
- Fea's petrel, Pterodroma feae
- Black-capped petrel, Pterodroma hasitata (A)
- Cory's shearwater, Calonectris diomedea
- Cape Verde shearwater, Calonectris edwardsii (A)
- Great shearwater, Ardenna gravis
- Sooty shearwater, Ardenna griseus (A)
- Manx shearwater, Puffinus puffinus
- Balearic shearwater, Puffinus mauretanicus (A)
- Barolo shearwater, Puffinus baroli

== Storks ==
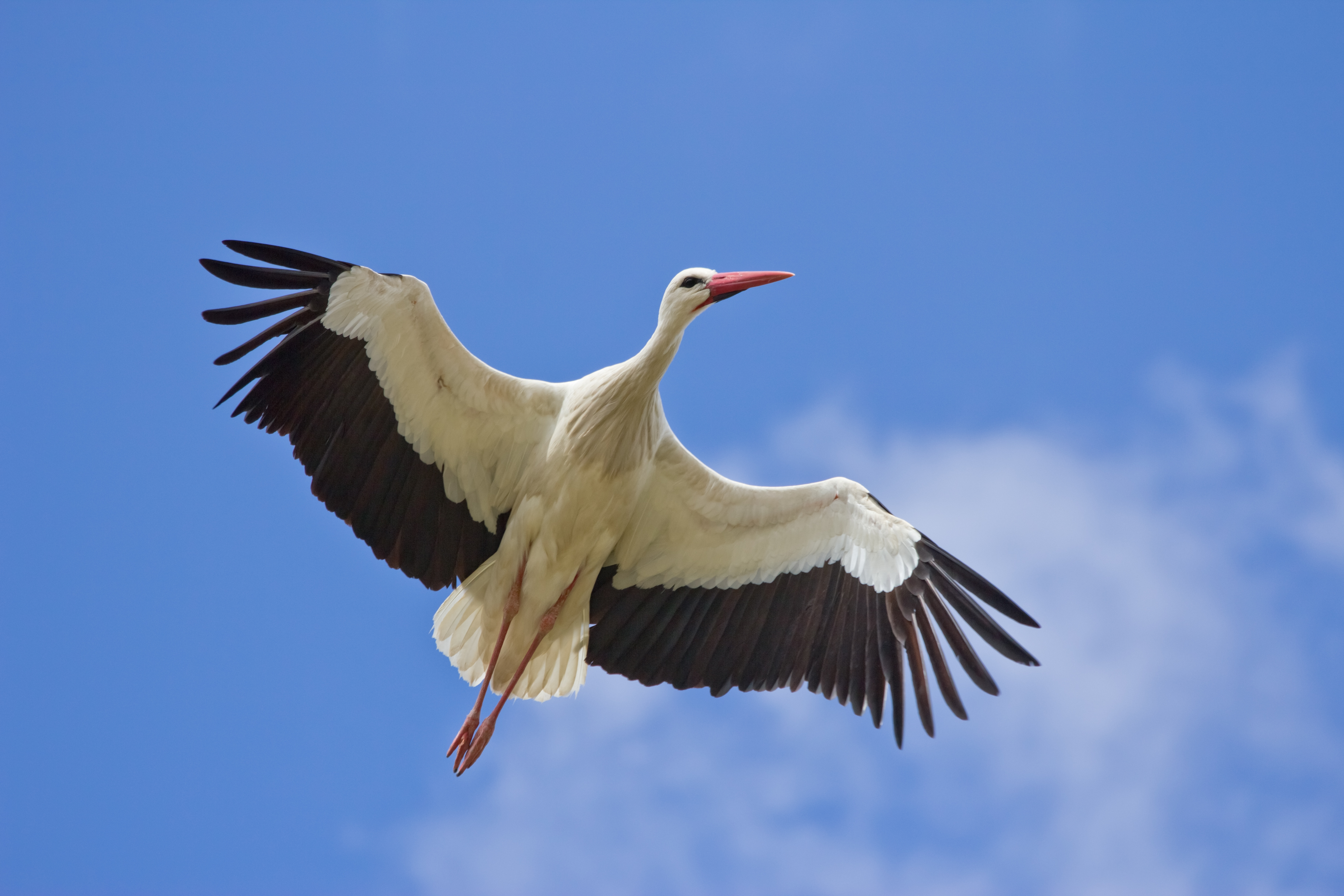
White stork

Order: Ciconiiformes Family: Ciconiidae

Storks are large, long-legged, long-necked, wading birds with long, stout bills. Storks are mute, but bill-clattering is an important mode of communication at the nest. Their nests can be large and may be reused for many years. Many species are migratory.

- White stork, Ciconia ciconia (A)
- Black stork, Ciconia nigra (A)

== Boobies and gannets ==
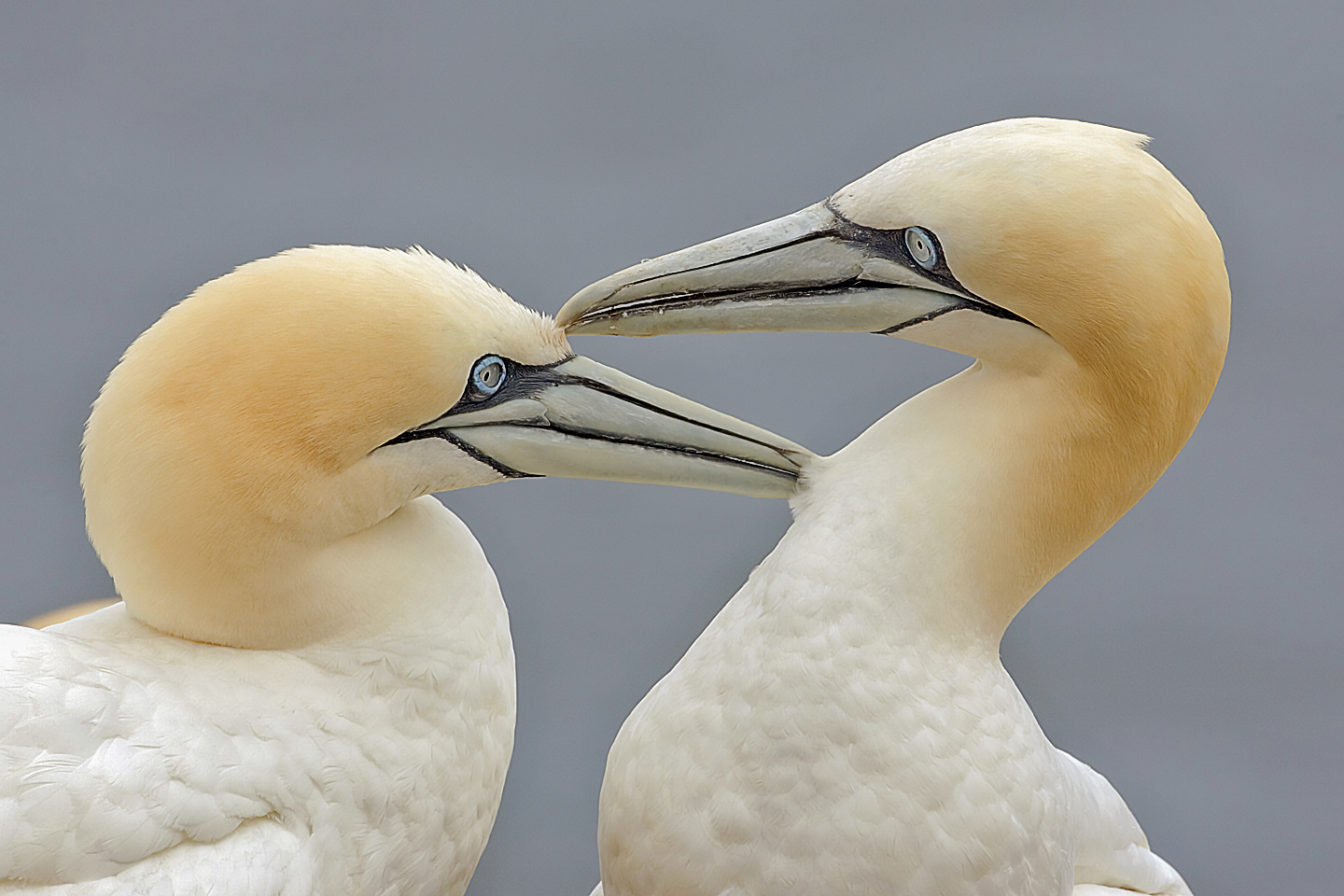
Northern gannet

Order: Suliformes Family: Sulidae

The sulids comprise the gannets and boobies. Both groups are medium to large coastal seabirds that plunge-dive for fish.

- Northern gannet, Morus bassanus (A)
- Brown booby, Sula leucogaster (A)

== Cormorants and shags ==
Order: Suliformes Family: Phalacrocoracidae

Phalacrocoracidae is a family of medium to large coastal, fish-eating seabirds that includes cormorants and shags. Plumage colouration varies, with the majority having mainly dark plumage, some species being black-and-white and a few being colourful.

- European shag, Gulosus aristotelis (A)
- Great cormorant, Phalacrocorax carbo (A)

== Herons, egrets, and bitterns ==
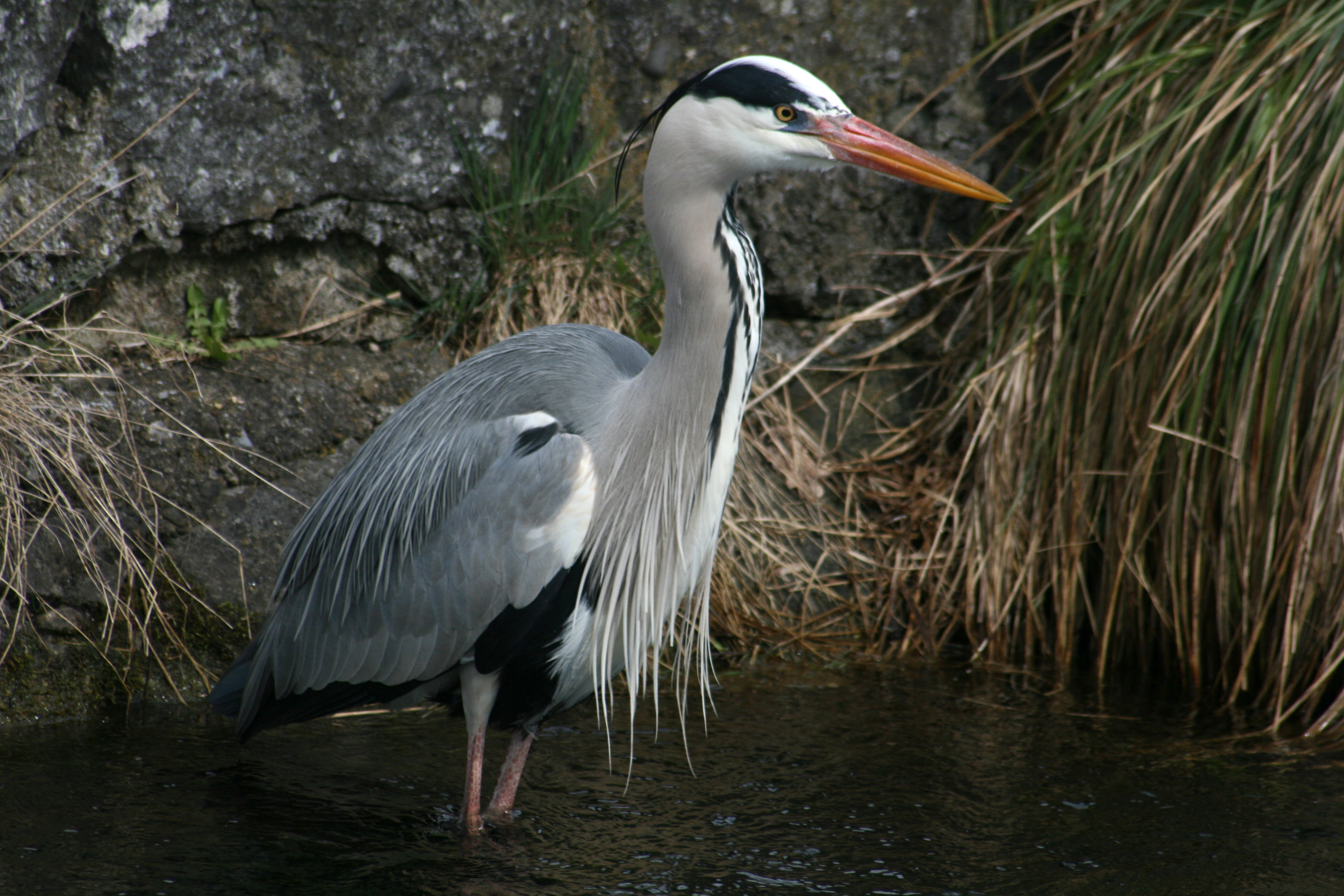
Gray heron

Order: Pelecaniformes Family: Ardeidae

The family Ardeidae contains the bitterns, herons and egrets. Herons and egrets are medium to large wading birds with long necks and legs. Bitterns tend to be shorter necked and more wary. Members of Ardeidae fly with their necks retracted, unlike other long-necked birds such as storks, ibises and spoonbills.

- Great bittern, Botaurus stellaris (A)
- Little bittern, Ixobrychus minutus (A)
- Gray heron, Ardea cinerea
- Purple heron, Ardea purpurea (A)
- Great egret, Egretta alba
- Little egret, Egretta garzetta
- Western reef-heron, Egretta gularis (A)
- Cattle egret, Bubulcus ibis (A)
- Squacco heron, Ardeola ralloides (A)
- Green heron, Butorides virescens (A)
- Black-crowned night-heron, Nycticorax nycticorax (A)
- Yellow-crowned night-heron, Nyctanassa violacea (A)

== Ibises and spoonbills ==
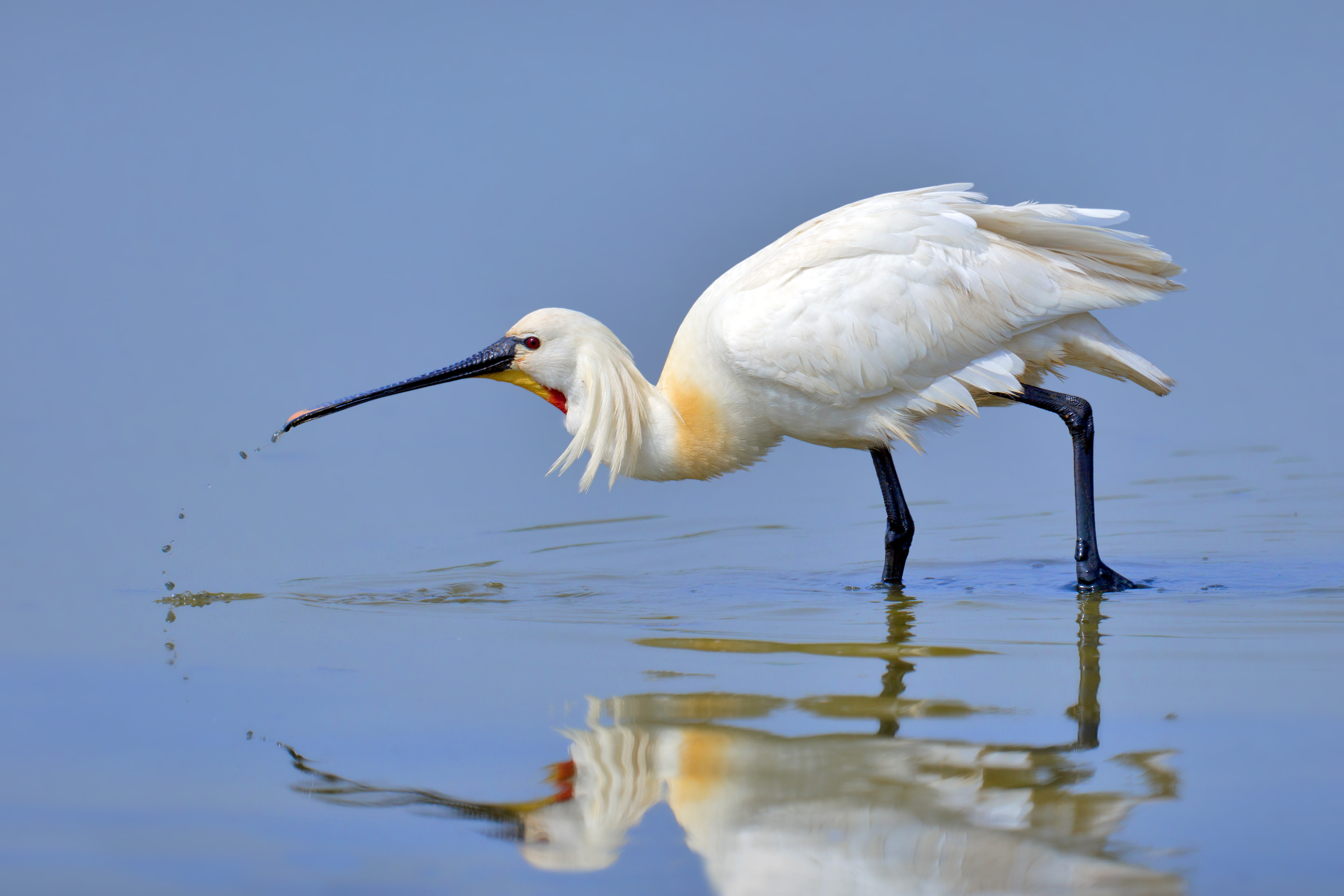
Eurasian spoonbill

Order: Pelecaniformes Family: Threskiornithidae

Threskiornithidae is a family of large terrestrial and wading birds which includes the ibises and spoonbills. They have long, broad wings with 11 primary and about 20 secondary feathers. They are strong fliers and despite their size and weight, very capable soarers.

- Eurasian spoonbill, Platalea leucorodia (A)
- Glossy ibis, Plegadis falcinellus (A)

== Osprey ==
Order: Accipitriformes Family: Pandionidae

The family Pandionidae contains only one species, the osprey. The osprey is a medium-large raptor and a specialist fish-eater with a worldwide distribution.

- Osprey, Pandion haliaetus (A)

== Hawks, kites and eagles ==
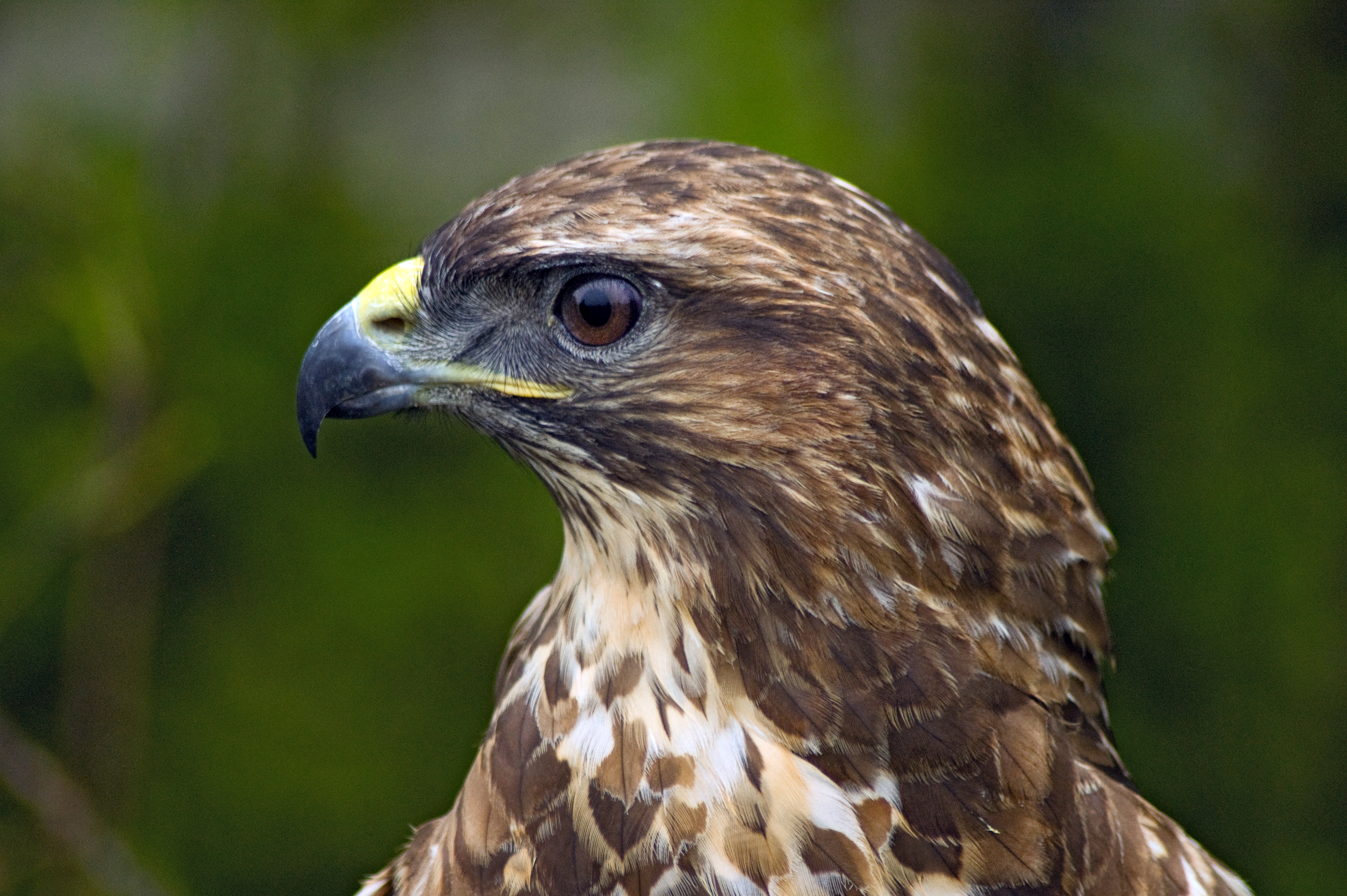
Common buzzard

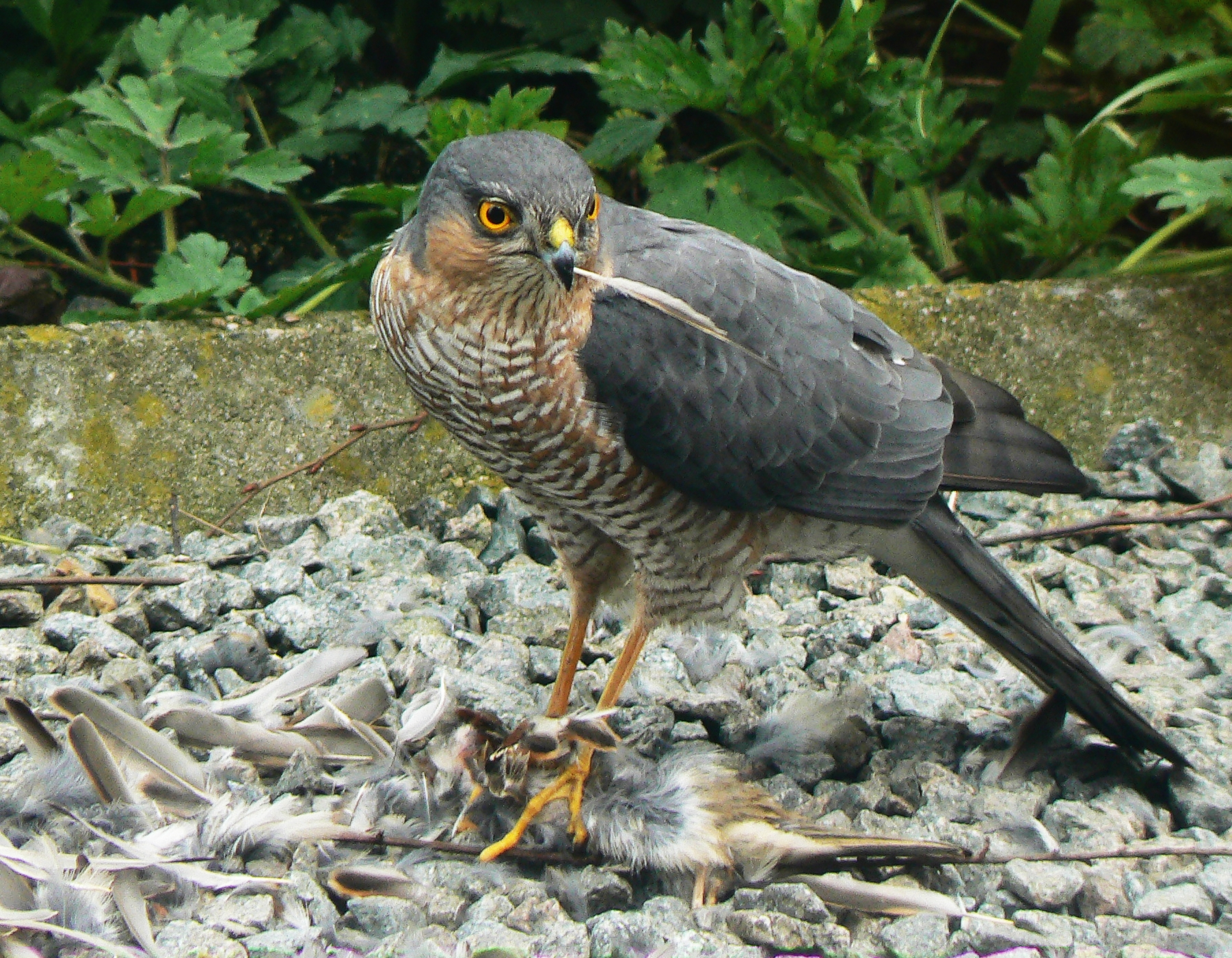
Eurasian sparrowhawk

Order: Accipitriformes Family: Accipitridae

Accipitridae is a family of birds of prey, which includes hawks, eagles, kites, harriers and Old World vultures. These birds have powerful hooked beaks for tearing flesh from their prey, strong legs, powerful talons and keen eyesight.

- Black-winged kite, Elanus caeruleus (A)
- Egyptian vulture, Neophron percnopterus (A)
- European honey-buzzard, Pernis apivorus (A)
- Short-toed snake-eagle, Circaetus gallicus (A)
- Booted eagle, Hieraaetus pennatus (A)
- Tawny eagle, Aquila rapax (A)
- Steppe eagle, Aquila nipalensis (A)
- Eurasian marsh-harrier, Circus aeruginosus (A)
- Hen harrier, Circus cyaneus (A)
- Pallid harrier, Circus macrourus (A)
- Montagu's harrier, Circus pygargus (A)
- Eurasian sparrowhawk, Accipiter nisus
- Red kite, Milvus milvus (A)
- Black kite, Milvus migrans (A)
- Common buzzard, Buteo buteo
- Long-legged buzzard, Buteo rufinus (A)

== Barn-owls ==
Order: Strigiformes Family: Tytonidae

Barn-owls are medium-sized to large owls with large heads and characteristic heart-shaped faces. They have long strong legs with powerful talons.

- Barn owl, Tyto alba

== Owls ==
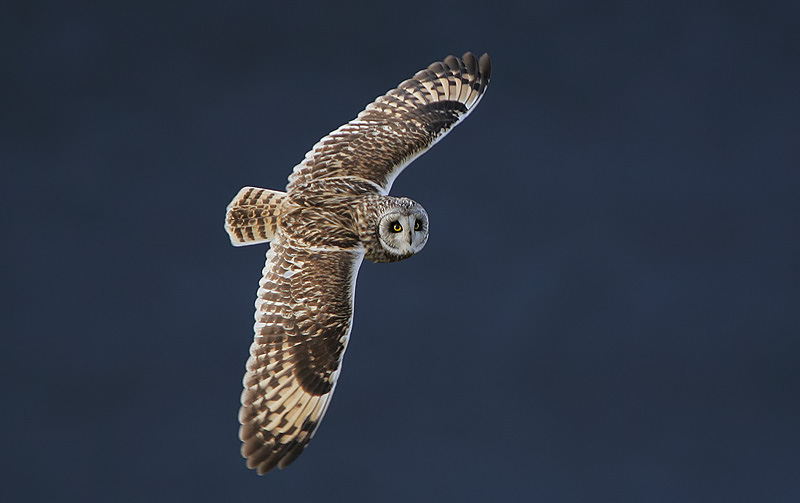
Short-eared owl

Order: Strigiformes Family: Strigidae

Typical owls are small to large solitary nocturnal birds of prey. They have large forward-facing eyes and ears, a hawk-like beak and a conspicuous circle of feathers around each eye called a facial disc.

- Short-eared owl, Asio flammeus (A)
- Long-eared owl, Asio otus (A)
- Eurasian scops-owl, Otus scops (A)

== Hoopoes ==
Order: Coraciiformes Family: Upupidae

Hoopoes have black, white and orangey-pink colouring with a large erectile crest on their head. .

- Eurasian hoopoe, Upupa epops

== Kingfishers ==
Order: Coraciiformes Family: Alcedinidae

Kingfishers are medium-sized birds with large heads, long, pointed bills, short legs and stubby tails.

- Common kingfisher, Alcedo atthis (A)

== Bee-eaters ==
Order: Coraciiformes Family: Meropidae

The bee-eaters are a group of near passerine birds in the family Meropidae. Most species are found in Africa but others occur in southern Europe, Madagascar, Australia and New Guinea. They are characterised by richly coloured plumage, slender bodies and usually elongated central tail feathers. All are colourful and have long downturned bills and pointed wings, which give them a swallow-like appearance when seen from afar.

- European bee-eater, Merops apiaster (A)
- Blue-cheeked bee-eater, Merops persicus (A)

== Rollers ==
Order: Coraciiformes Family: Coraciidae

Rollers resemble crows in size and build, but are more closely related to the kingfishers and bee-eaters. They share the colourful appearance of those groups with blues and browns predominating. The two inner front toes are connected, but the outer toe is not.

- European roller, Coracias garrulus (A)

== Woodpeckers ==
Order: Piciformes Family: Picidae

Woodpeckers are small to medium-sized birds with chisel-like beaks, short legs, stiff tails and long tongues used for capturing insects. Some species have feet with two toes pointing forward and two backward, while several species have only three toes. Many woodpeckers have the habit of tapping noisily on tree trunks with their beaks.

- Eurasian wryneck, Jynx torquilla (A)

== Falcons and caracaras ==
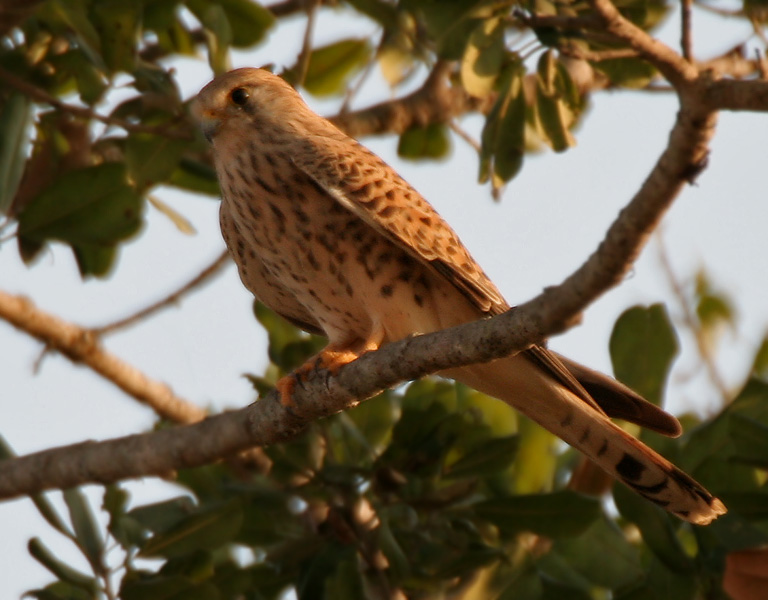
Eurasian kestrel (female)

Order: Falconiformes Family: Falconidae

Falconidae is a family of diurnal birds of prey. They differ from hawks, eagles and kites in that they kill with their beaks instead of their talons.

- Lesser kestrel, Falco naumanni (A)
- Eurasian kestrel, Falco tinnunculus
- Red-footed falcon, Falco vespertinus (A)
- Eleonora's falcon, Falco eleonorae (A)
- Merlin, Falco columbarius (A)
- Eurasian hobby, Falco subbuteo (A)
- Peregrine falcon, Falco peregrinus (A)

== Old World parrots ==
Order: Psittaciformes Family: Psittaculidae

Characteristic features of parrots include a strong curved bill, an upright stance, strong legs, and clawed zygodactyl feet. Many parrots are vividly colored, and some are multi-colored. In size they range from 8 cm (3.1 in) to 1 m (3.3 ft) in length. Old World parrots are found from Africa east across south and southeast Asia and Oceania to Australia and New Zealand.

- Rose-ringed parakeet, Psittacula krameri (I)

== Old-World orioles ==
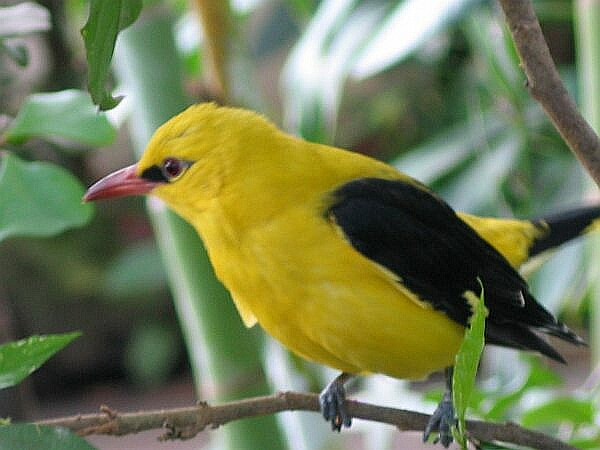
Eurasian golden oriole

Order: Passeriformes Family: Oriolidae

The Old World orioles are colourful medium-sized passerine birds. The beak is slightly curved and hooked, and, except in the figbirds, as long as the head. The plumage of most species is bright and showy, although the females often have duller plumage than the males. They are not related to the New World orioles.

- Eurasian golden oriole, Oriolus oriolus (A)

== Shrikes ==
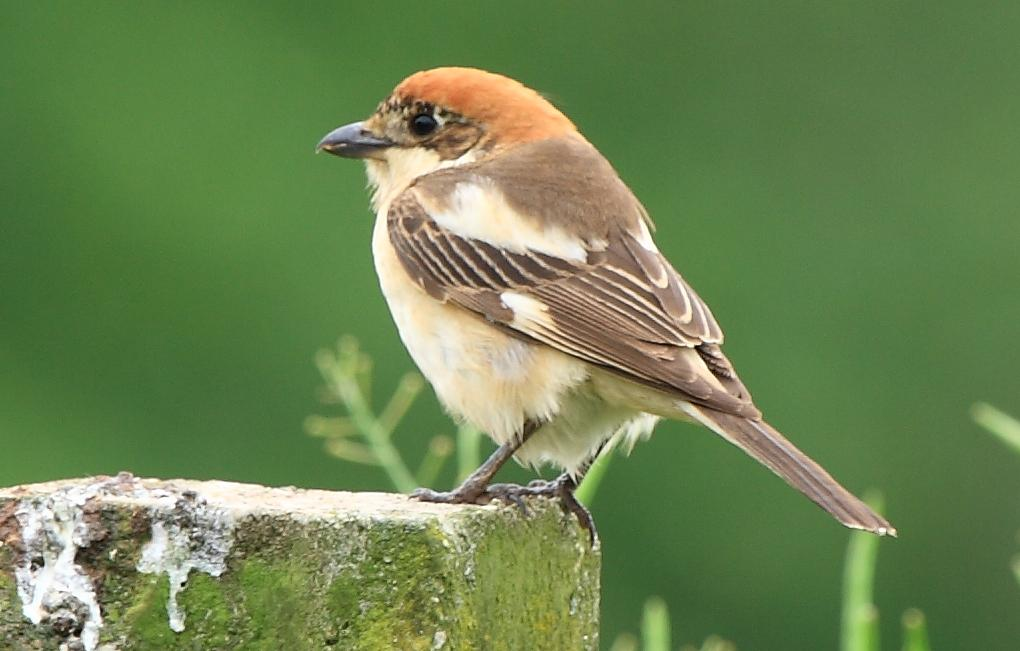
Woodchat shrike

Order: Passeriformes Family: Laniidae

Shrikes are passerine birds known for their habit of catching other birds and small animals and impaling the uneaten portions of their bodies on thorns. A typical shrike's beak is hooked, like a bird of prey.

- Red-backed shrike, Lanius collurio (A)
- Woodchat shrike, Lanius senator (A)

== Crows, jays, and magpies ==
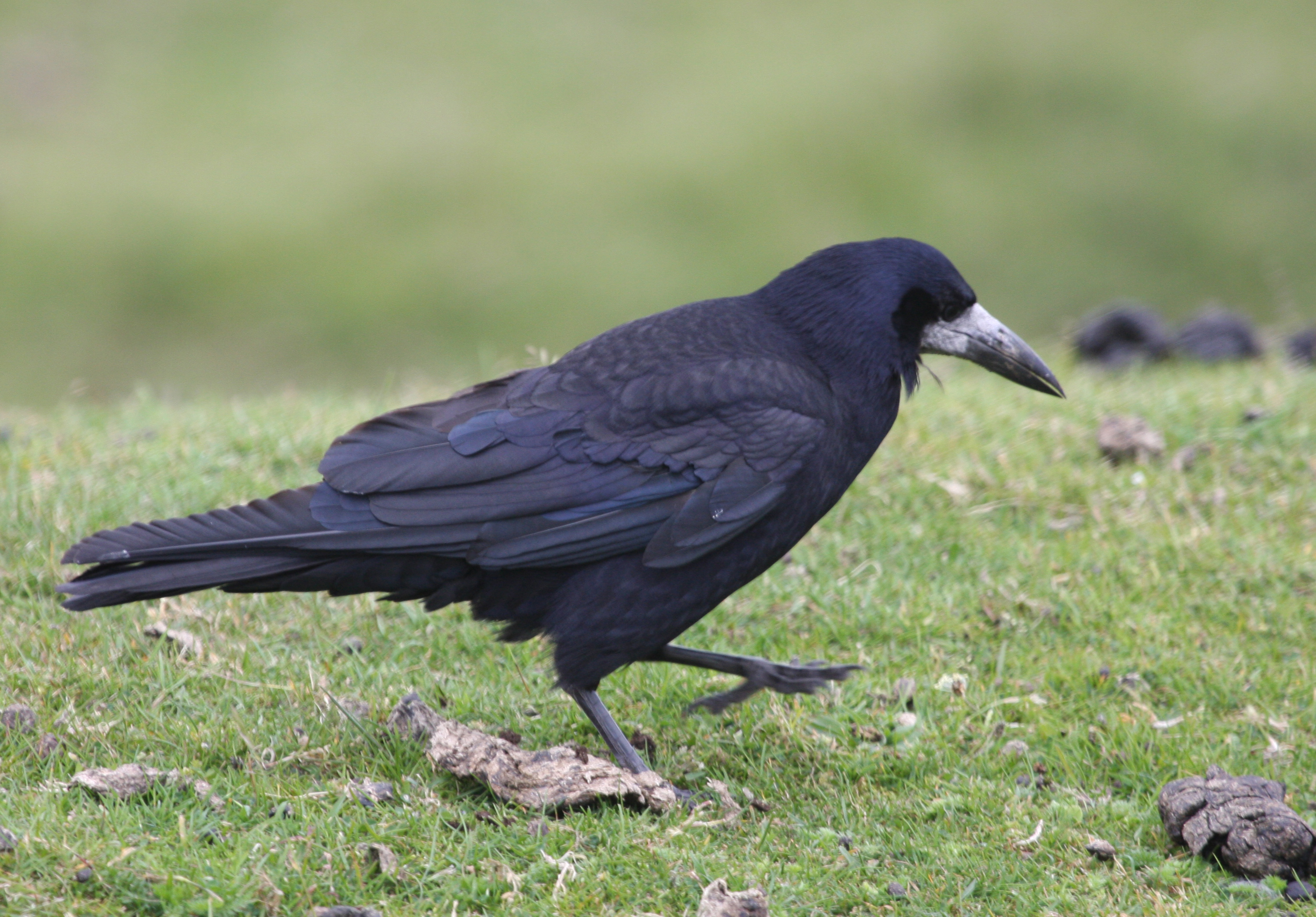
Rook

Order: Passeriformes Family: Corvidae

The family Corvidae includes crows, ravens, jays, choughs, magpies, treepies, nutcrackers and ground jays. Corvids are above average in size among the Passeriformes, and some of the larger species show high levels of intelligence.

- Eurasian jackdaw, Corvus monedula (A)
- Rook, Corvus frugilegus (A)
- Hooded crow, Corvus cornix (A)
- Common raven, Corvus corax (A)

== Larks ==
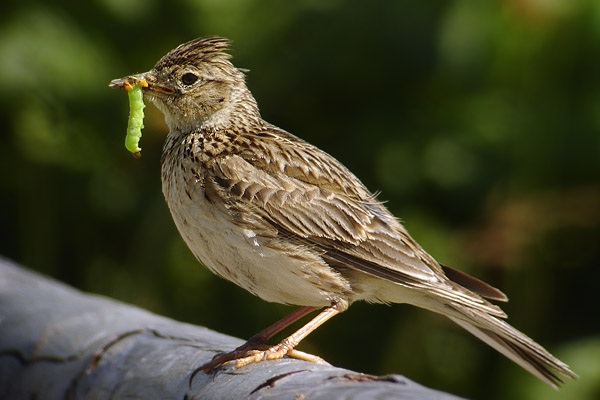
Sky lark

Order: Passeriformes Family: Alaudidae

Larks are small terrestrial birds with often extravagant songs and display flights. Most larks are fairly dull in appearance. Their food is insects and seeds.

- Greater short-toed lark, Calandrella brachydactyla (A)
- Calandra lark, Melanocorypha calandra (A)
- Mediterranean short-toed lark, Alaudala rufescens
- Wood lark, Lullula arborea (A)
- Eurasian skylark, Alauda arvensis (A)

== Reed warblers and allies ==
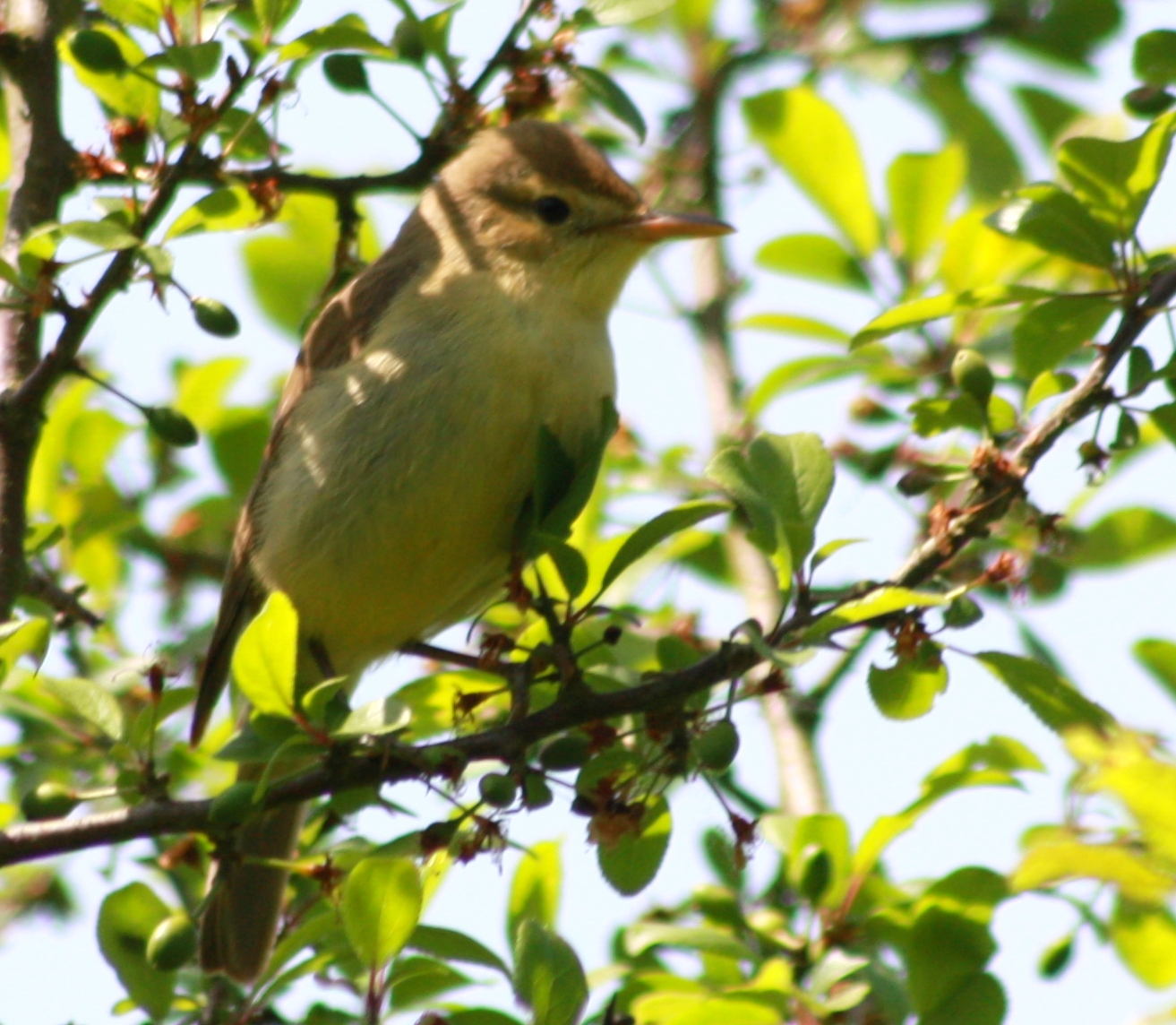
Melodious warbler

Order: Passeriformes Family: Acrocephalidae

Acrocephalidae (the marsh- and tree-warblers or acrocephalid warblers) is a family of oscine passerine birds, in the superfamily Sylvioidea. Most species are rather plain olivaceous brown above with much yellow to beige below. They are usually found in open woodland, reedbeds or tall grass.

- Melodious warbler, Hippolais polyglotta (A)
- Icterine warbler, Hippolais icterina (A)
- Sedge warbler, Acrocephalus schoenobaenus (A)
- Marsh warbler, Acrocephalus palustris (A)
- Common reed warbler, Acrocephalus scirpaceus
- Great reed warbler, Acrocephalus arundinaceus (A)

== Grassbirds and allies ==
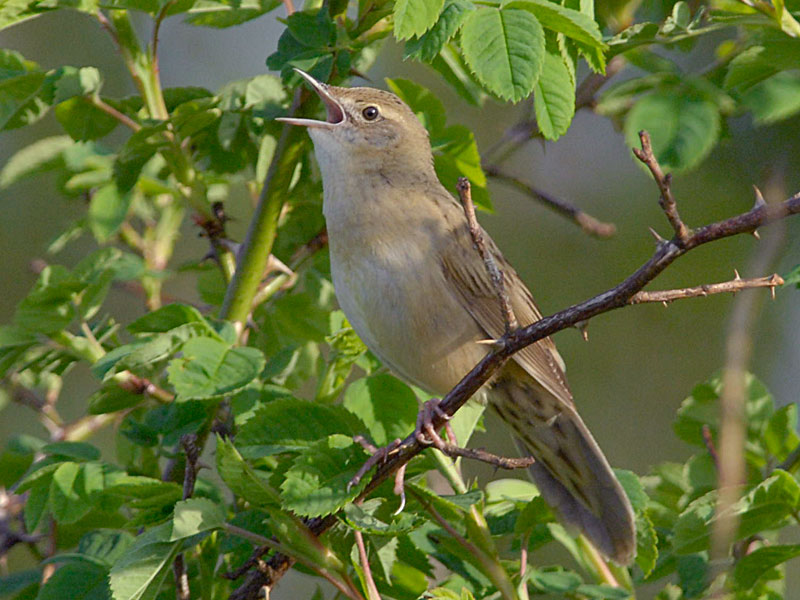
Common grasshopper-warbler

Order: Passeriformes Family: Locustellidae

Locustellidae is a family of small insectivorous songbirds ("warblers"), formerly placed in the Old World warbler family. It contains the grass-warblers, grassbirds, and the Bradypterus "bush-warblers". The species are smallish birds with tails that are usually long and pointed. Most live in scrubland and frequently hunt food by clambering through thick tangled growth or pursuing it on the ground.

- River warbler, Locustella fluviatilis (A)
- Common grasshopper-warbler, Locustella naevia (A)

== Swallows ==
Order: Passeriformes Family: Hirundinidae

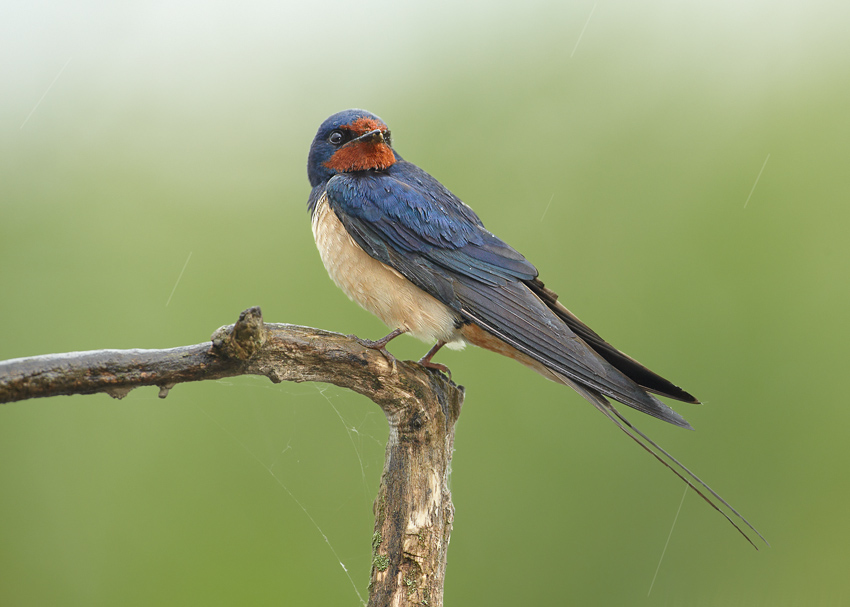
Barn swallow

The family Hirundinidae is adapted to aerial feeding. They have a slender streamlined body, long pointed wings and a short bill with a wide gape. The feet are adapted to perching rather than walking, and the front toes are partially joined at the base.

- Bank swallow, Riparia riparia (A)
- Eurasian crag-martin, Ptyonoprogne rupestris (A)
- Barn swallow, Hirundo rustica
- Red-rumped swallow, Cecropis daurica (A)
- Common house-martin, Delichon urbicum

== Leaf warblers ==
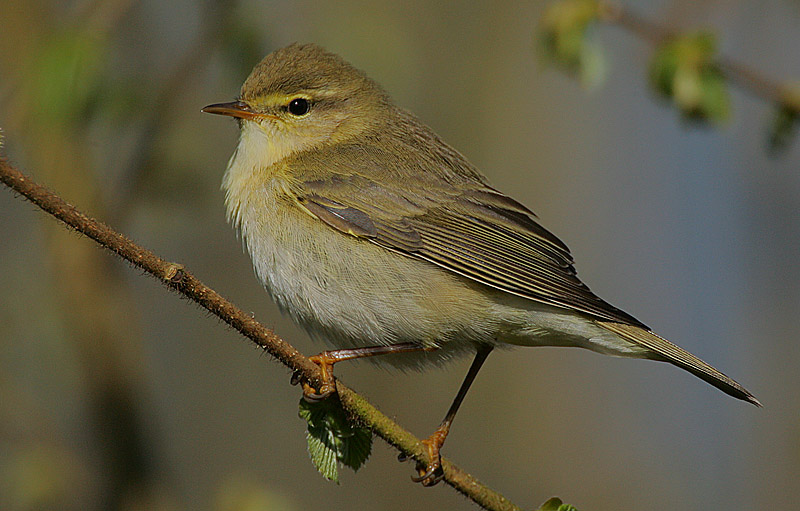
Willow warbler

Order: Passeriformes Family: Phylloscopidae

Phylloscopidae is a family of small insectivorous birds formerly placed in the Old World warbler family. Its members occur in Eurasia, ranging into Wallacea and Africa (and the Arctic warbler breeding east into Alaska). Most live in forest and scrub and frequently catch food on the wing.

- Wood warbler, Phylloscopus sibilatrix (A)
- Western Bonelli's warbler, Phylloscopus bonelli (A)
- Yellow-browed warbler, Phylloscopus inornatus (A)
- Willow warbler, Phylloscopus trochilus (A)
- Common chiffchaff, Phylloscopus collybita (A)
- Iberian chiffchaff, Phylloscopus ibericus (A)
- Greenish warbler, Phylloscopus trochiloides (A)
- Two-barred warbler, Phylloscopus plumbeitarsus (A)

== Sylviid warblers, parrotbills, and allies ==
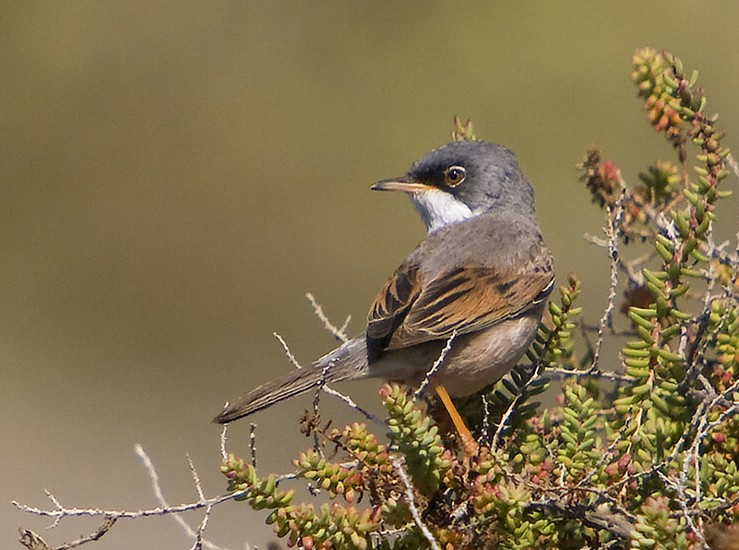
Spectacled warbler

Order: Passeriformes Family: Sylviidae

The family Sylviidae is a group of small insectivorous passerine birds. They mainly occur as breeding species, as the common name implies, in Europe, Asia and, to a lesser extent, Africa. Most are of generally undistinguished appearance, but many have distinctive songs.

- Eurasian blackcap, Sylvia atricapilla
- Garden warbler, Sylvia borin (A)
- Lesser whitethroat, Curruca curruca (A)
- Western Orphean warbler, Curruca hortensis (A)
- Sardinian warbler, Curruca melanocephala (A)
- Western subalpine warbler, Curruca iberiae
- Greater whitethroat, Curruca communis (A)
- Spectacled warbler, Curruca conspicillata

== Kinglets ==
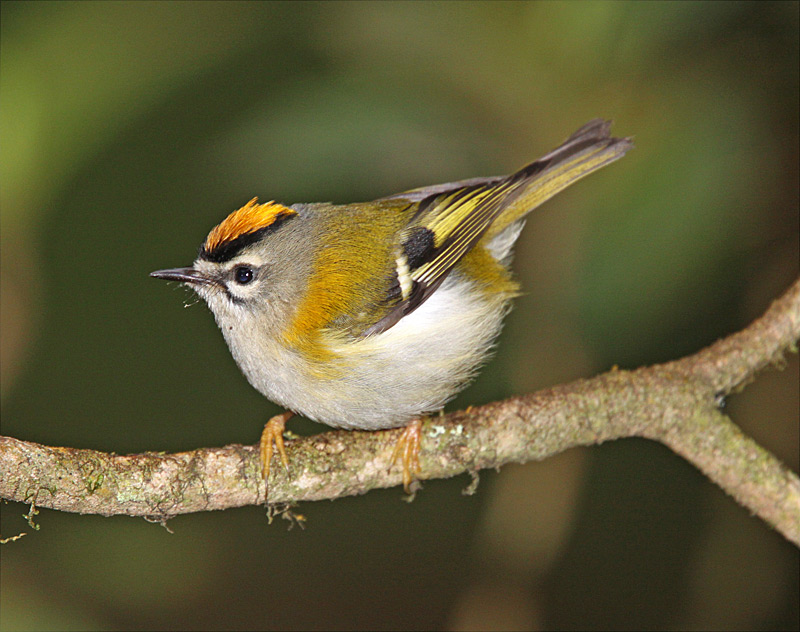
Madeira firecrest (R. madeirensis)

Order: Passeriformes Family: Regulidae

The kinglets, also called crests, are a small group of birds often included in the Old World warblers, but frequently given family status because they also resemble the titmice.

- Goldcrest, Regulus regulus
- Madeira firecrest, Regulus madeirensis (E)

== Wrens ==
Order: Passeriformes Family: Troglodytidae

The wrens are mainly small and inconspicuous except for their loud songs. These birds have short wings and thin down-turned bills. Several species often hold their tails upright. All are insectivorous.

- Eurasian wren, Troglodytes troglodytes (A)

== Starlings ==
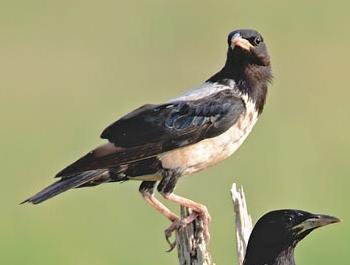
Rosy starling

Order: Passeriformes Family: Sturnidae

Starlings are small to medium-sized passerine birds. Their flight is strong and direct and they are very gregarious. Their preferred habitat is fairly open country. They eat insects and fruit. Plumage is typically dark with a metallic sheen.

- European starling, Sturnus vulgaris
- Spotless starling, Sturnus unicolor (A)
- Rosy starling, Pastor roseus (A)
- Common myna, Acridotheres tristis (A)
- Greater blue-eared starling, Lamprotornis chalybaeus (A)

== Thrushes and allies ==
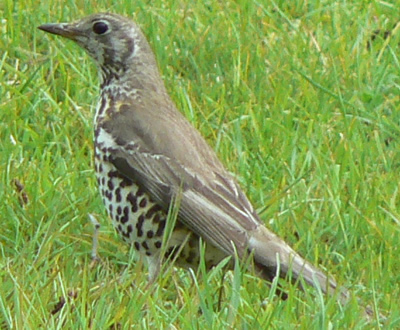
Mistle thrush

Order: Passeriformes Family: Turdidae

The thrushes are a group of passerine birds that occur mainly in the Old World. They are plump, soft plumaged, small to medium-sized insectivores or sometimes omnivores, often feeding on the ground. Many have attractive songs.

- Wood thrush, Hylocichla mustelina (A)
- Mistle thrush, Turdus viscivorus (A)
- Song thrush, Turdus philomelos (A)
- Redwing, Turdus iliacus (A)
- Eurasian blackbird, Turdus merula
- Fieldfare, Turdus pilaris (A)
- Ring ouzel, Turdus torquatus (A)
- Black-throated thrush, Turdus atrogularis (A)
- Red-throated thrush, Turdus ruficollis (A)

== Old World flycatchers ==
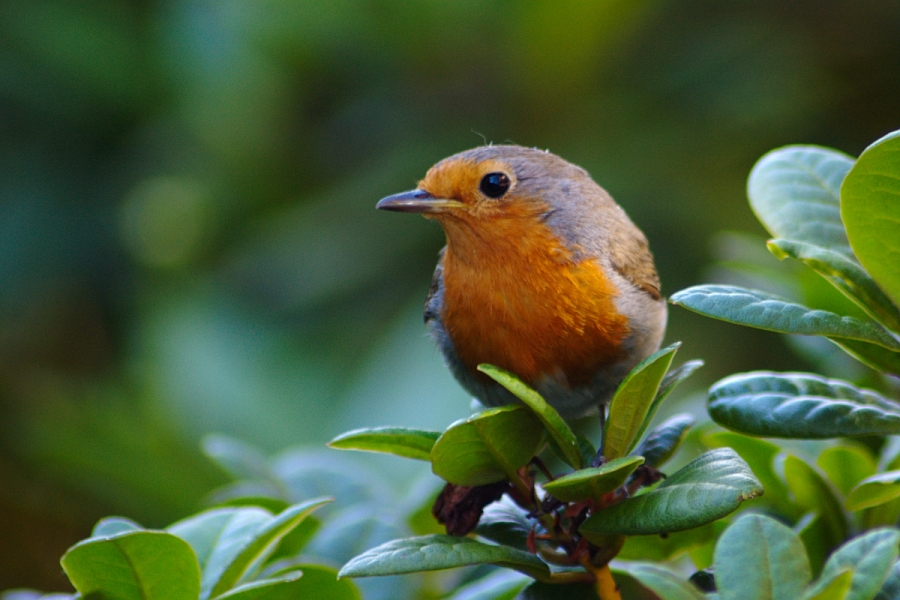
European robin

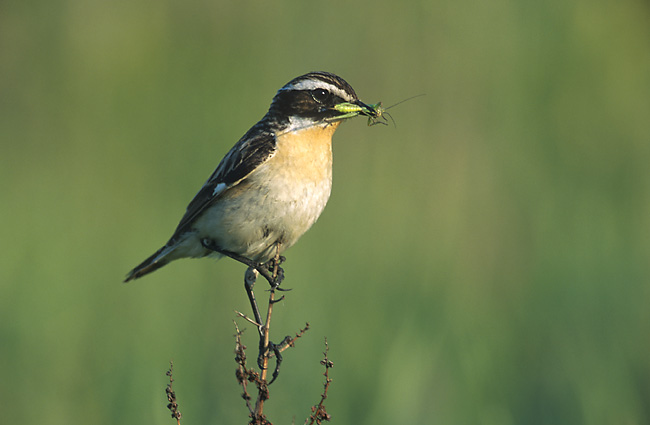
Whinchat

Order: Passeriformes Family: Muscicapidae

Old World flycatchers are a large group of small passerine birds native to the Old World. They are mainly small arboreal insectivores. The appearance of these birds is highly varied, but they mostly have weak songs and harsh calls.

- Spotted flycatcher, Muscicapa striata (A)
- Rufous-tailed scrub-robin, Cercotrichas galactotes (A)
- European robin, Erithacus rubecula
- Common nightingale, Luscinia megarhynchos (A)
- Bluethroat, Luscinia svecica (A)
- Red-breasted flycatcher, Ficedula parva (A)
- European pied flycatcher, Ficedula hypoleuca (A)
- Common redstart, Phoenicurus phoenicurus (A)
- Black redstart, Phoenicurus ochruros (A)
- Rufous-tailed rock-thrush, Monticola saxatilis (A)
- Whinchat, Saxicola rubetra (A)
- European stonechat, Saxicola rubicola (A)
- Northern wheatear, Oenanthe oenanthe (A)
- Isabelline wheatear, Oenanthe isabellina (A)
- Desert wheatear, Oenanthe deserti (A)
- Western black-eared wheatear, Oenanthe hispanica (A)

== Waxbills and allies ==
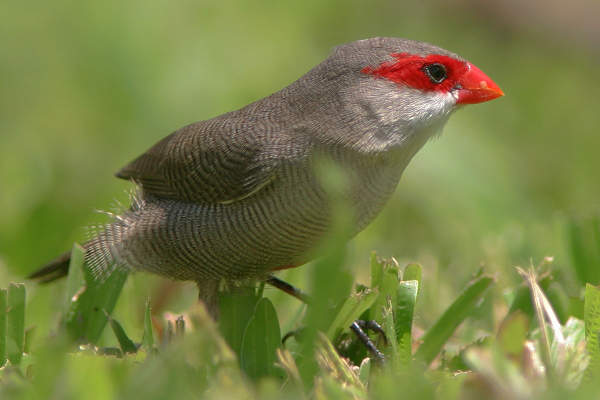
Common waxbill

Order: Passeriformes Family: Estrildidae

The estrildid finches are small passerine birds of the Old World tropics and Australasia. They are gregarious and often colonial seed eaters with short thick but pointed bills. They are all similar in structure and habits, but have wide variation in plumage colours and patterns.

- Common waxbill, Estrilda astrild (I)
- Red avadavat, Amandava amandava (I)

== Accentors ==
Order: Passeriformes Family: Prunellidae

The accentors are in the only bird family, Prunellidae, which is completely endemic to the Palearctic. They are small, fairly drab species superficially similar to sparrows.

- Dunnock, Prunella modularis (A)

== Old World sparrows ==
Order: Passeriformes Family: Passeridae

Old World sparrows are small passerine birds. In general, sparrows tend to be small, plump, brown or grey birds with short tails and short powerful beaks. Sparrows are seed eaters, but they also consume small insects.

- House sparrow, Passer domesticus (A)
- Spanish sparrow, Passer hispaniolensis (I)
- Rock sparrow, Petronia petronia

== Wagtails and pipits ==
Order: Passeriformes Family: Motacillidae

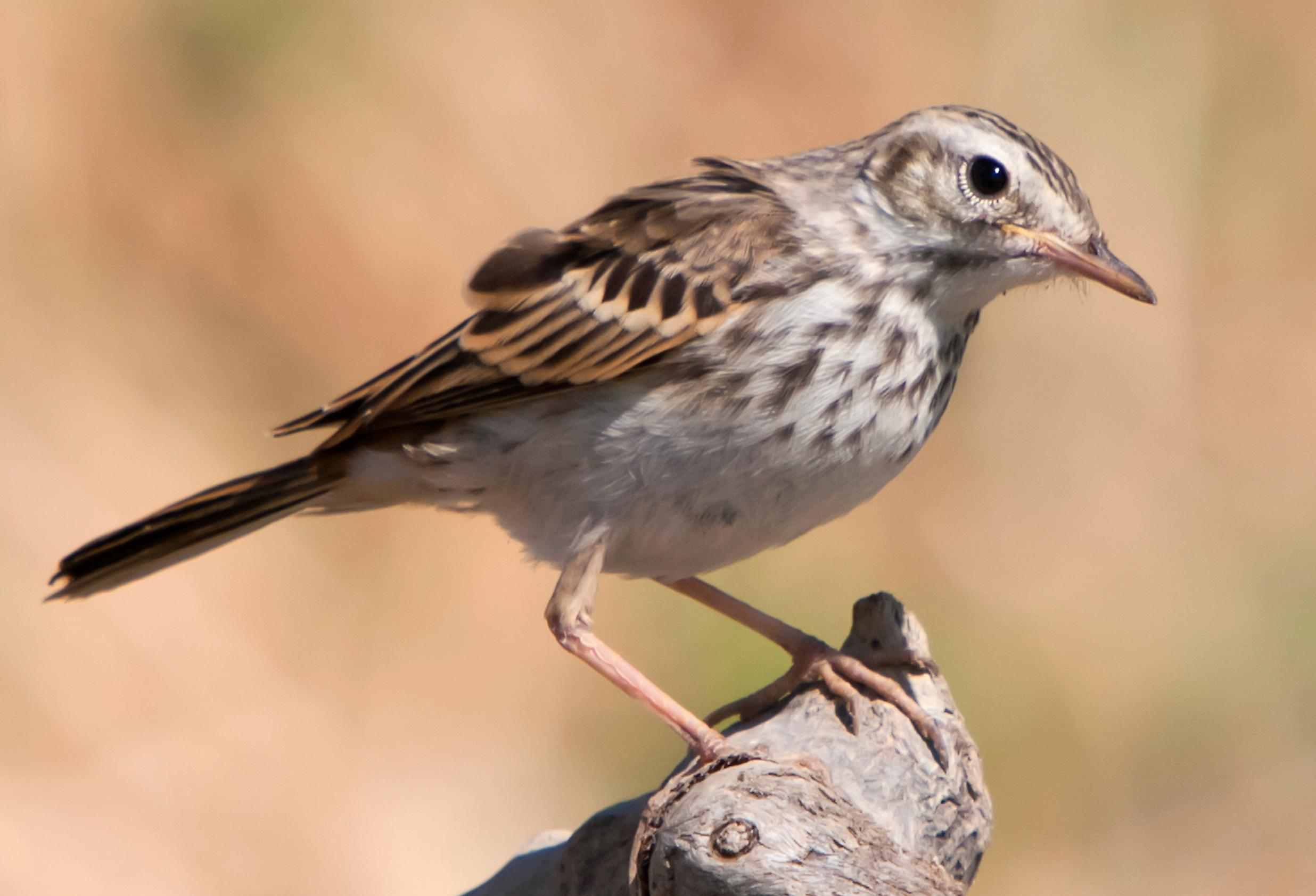
Berthelot's pipit

Motacillidae is a family of small passerine birds with medium to long tails. They include the wagtails, longclaws and pipits. They are slender, ground feeding insectivores of open country.

- Gray wagtail, Motacilla cinerea
- Western yellow wagtail, Motacilla flava (A)
- Citrine wagtail, Motacilla citreola (A)
- White wagtail, Motacilla alba
- Richard's pipit, Anthus richardi (A)
- Tawny pipit, Anthus campestris (A)
- Berthelot's pipit, Anthus berthelotii
- Meadow pipit, Anthus pratensis (A)
- Tree pipit, Anthus trivialis (A)
- Red-throated pipit, Anthus cervinus (A)
- Rock pipit, Anthus petrosus (A)

== Finches, euphonias, and allies ==
Order: Passeriformes Family: Fringillidae

Finches are seed-eating passerine birds, that are small to moderately large and have a strong beak, usually conical and in some species very large. All have twelve tail feathers and nine primaries. These birds have a bouncing flight with alternating bouts of flapping and gliding on closed wings, and most sing well.

- Common chaffinch, Fringilla coelebs
- Brambling, Fringilla montifringilla (A)
- Hawfinch, Coccothraustes coccothraustes (A)
- Trumpeter finch, Bucanetes githagineus (A)
- European greenfinch, Chloris chloris
- Eurasian linnet, Linaria cannabina
- Common redpoll, Acanthis flammea (A)
- Parrot crossbill, Loxia pytyopsittacus (A)
- Red crossbill, Loxia curvirostra (A)
- European goldfinch, Carduelis carduelis
- European serin, Serinus serinus (A)
- Island canary, Serinus canaria
- Eurasian siskin, Spinus spinus

== Longspurs and snow buntings ==
Order: Passeriformes Family: Calcariidae

The Calcariidae are a small family of passerine birds.

- Snow bunting, Plectrophenax nivalis (A)

== Old World buntings ==
Order: Passeriformes Family: Emberizidae

The emberizids are a family of passerine birds. They are seed-eating birds with distinctively shaped bills.

- Corn bunting, Emberiza calandra (A)
- Ortolan bunting, Emberiza hortulana (A)
- Reed bunting, Emberiza schoeniclus (A)
- Little bunting, Emberiza pusilla (A)

== New World warblers ==
Order: Passeriformes Family: Parulidae

A group of small, often colourful passerine birds restricted to the New World. Most are arboreal and insectivorous.

- American redstart, Setophaga ruticilla (A)
- Yellow warbler, Setophaga petechia (A)

== See also ==
- List of birds of Portugal
- List of birds
- Lists of birds by region
- List of mammals of Madeira
- List of reptiles of Madeira
- List of amphibians of Madeira
