= Saldanha =

Saldanha may refer to:

== Places ==
=== South Africa ===
- Saldanha Bay, a bay in Western Cape
- Saldanha, Western Cape, a town on the bay
- Saldanha Bay Local Municipality, the unit of government that administers the Saldanha Bay region

=== Other countries ===
- Saldanha (Lisbon Metro), a railway station in Lisbon, Portugal
- Saldanha, a civil parish in Mogadouro, Portugal
- Saldaña de Burgos, Castile and León, Spain

== People ==
- Saldanha (footballer, born 1989), Brazilian football right-back
- Saldanha (footballer, born 1999), Brazilian football forward
- Saldanha da Gama (1846–1895), Brazilian admiral
- António de Saldanha (fl. 16th century), Castilian-Portuguese explorer for whom the South African bay is named
- Carlos Saldanha (born 1965), Brazilian film director
- Jacintha Saldanha (1966–2012), Indian nurse in London who committed suicide after a prank call
- João Carlos Saldanha de Oliveira Daun, 1st Duke of Saldanha (1790–1876), Portuguese marshal and statesman
- João Saldanha (1917–1990), Brazilian journalist and football manager
- José Pintos Saldanha (born 1964), Uruguayan footballer
- Josh Saldanha, former drummer for the German metal band Disillusion
- Lawrence Saldanha (born 1936), Indian Catholic priest, 10th Archbishop of Lahore
- Túlia Saldanha (1930–1988), Portuguese contemporary artist
- V. J. P. Saldanha (1925–2000), Indian Konkani-language writer
- Walter Saldanha (1931–2024), Indian advertising industry executive

== Military history ==
- Battle of Saldanha Bay (1781), a naval action of the Fourth Anglo-Dutch War
- Capitulation of Saldanha Bay, the 1796 surrender of a Dutch expeditionary force to the British Royal Navy
- HMS Saldanha, two vessels of the Royal Navy

== Science ==
- Saldanha (plant genus), a former genus in the plant family Rubiaceae
- Saldanha catshark, Apristurus saldanha
- 1456 Saldanha, an asteroid

== Other uses ==
- Saldanha Steel, a South African steel company
- Beals v. Saldanha, a Supreme Court of Canada decision
- Duke of Saldanha, a Portuguese title

== See also ==
- Saldaña (disambiguation), the Spanish form of this name
