= Saldaña =

Saldaña or Saldana may refer to:

== Places ==
- Saldaña, Palencia, a town in Spain
- Saldaña, Colombia, a town and municipality in the Tolima department of Colombia
- Saldaña de Burgos, a municipality in the province of Burgos, Castile and León, Spain
- Saldaña River, a river of Colombia

== People ==
- Saldana (surname)
- Saldaña (surname)

== See also ==
- Saldanha (disambiguation)
