= Maronesa =

Portuguese breed of cattle

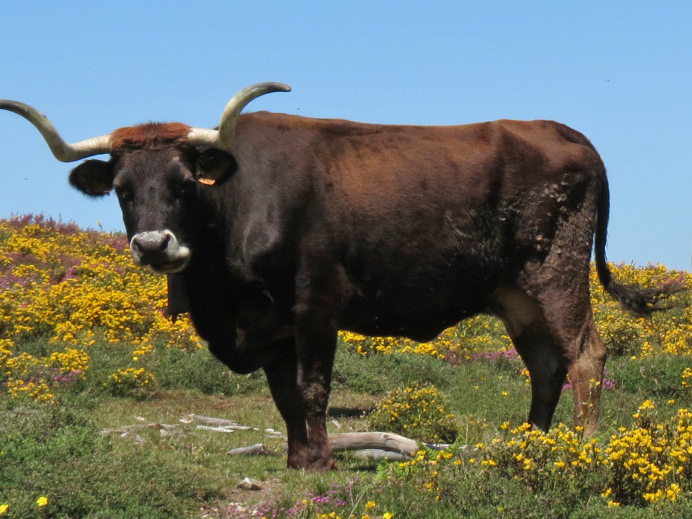

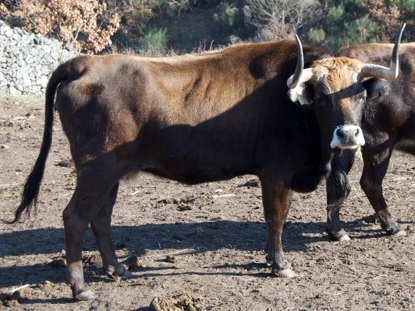
- Conservation status: FAO (2007): not at risk
- Other names: Maronês; Serrana; Penata
- Country of origin: Portugal
- Distribution: Serra do Marão
- Standard: Associação de Criadores do Maronês (in Portuguese)
- Use: draught, meat

Traits
- Weight: Male: 600 kg; Female: 375 kg
- Height: Male: 140 cm; Female: 130 cm
- Coat: black with reddish dorsal stripe
- Horn status: horns long, pointing forward and downward
- Cattle; Bos (primigenius) taurus

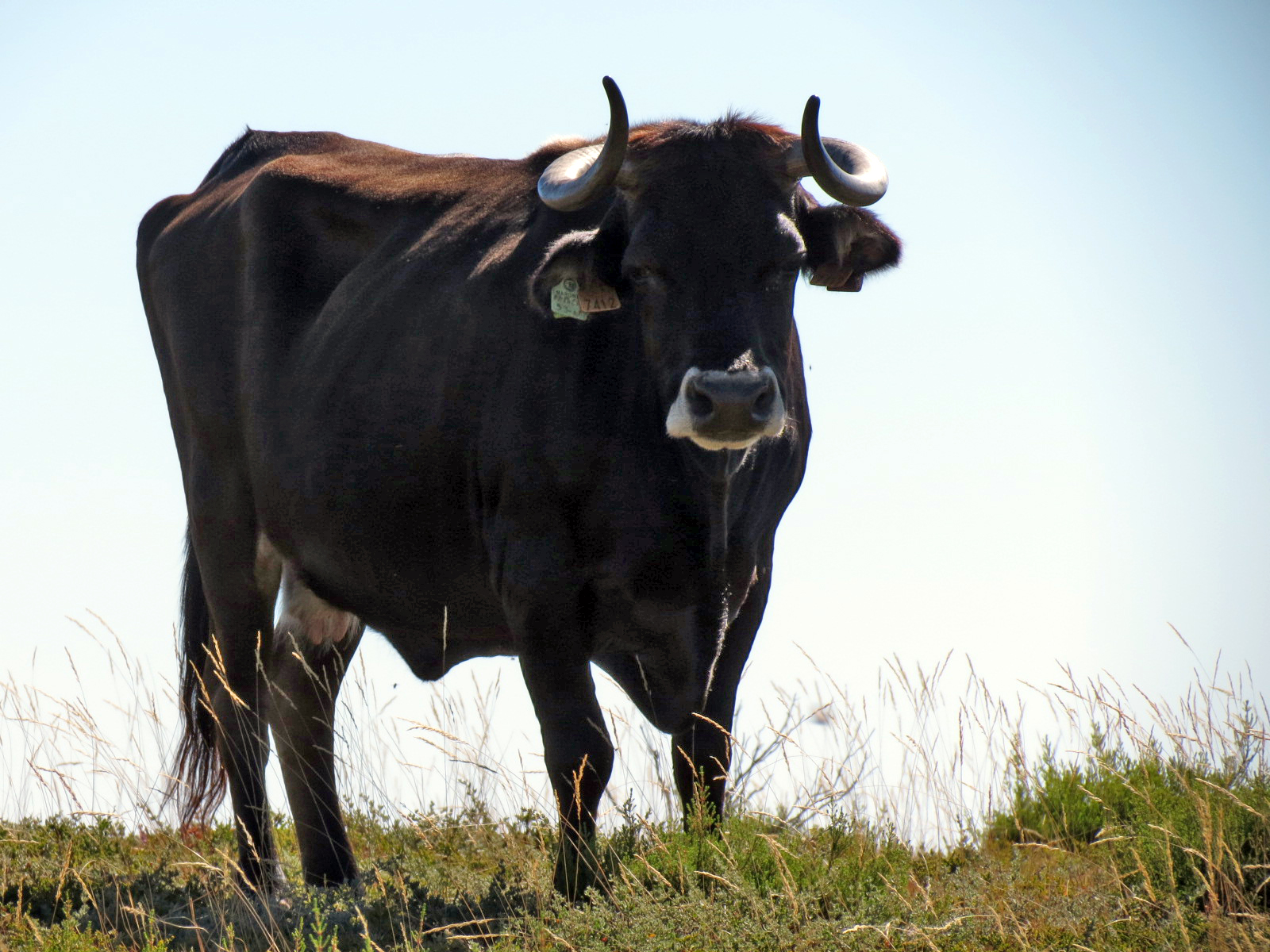
In the Parque Natural do Alvão

The Maronesa is a traditional Portuguese breed of mountain cattle. Its name derives from that of the Serra do Marão, which lies in the Trás-os-Montes and Douro Litoral regions in the northern part of the country. Its primary use is for draught power.

== History ==
The origin of the Maronesa is not clear and remains controversial. Historical evidence suggests that it derives from cross-breeding of the Barrosã and Mirandesa breeds, and it was considered a cross-breed until about 1835, when it was acknowledged to be a separate breed. Support for descent from Barrosã and Mirandesa comes from a 1993 study regarding the frequency of the 1/29 Robertsonian translocation in the three breeds, where the value for the Maronesa (~40%) is intermediate between that for the Barrosã (65%) and that for the Mirandesa (below 2%).

A study published in 1998 found it to have a substantial genetic distance from the Barrosã, the Mirandesa, and all other breeds of northern Portugal and Galicia, micro-satellite analysis of Portuguese breeds in 2004 grouped it most closely with the Barrosã.

The Maronesa was formerly numerous in the provinces of Douro, Minho and Trás-os-Montes, and particularly in the Serra do Alvão, the Serra da Padrela, and the Serra do Marão. There is no census data from before 1940, when just over 25000 head were counted; in 1955 there were 32252 animals registered, and in 1972 there were 29276. Numbers later dropped.

A breeders' association was formed by fourteen breeders in 1988, and a breed register was started in the same year. By 1996 the number of farmers rearing the breed had risen to almost 1500. In 2008, the breed was officially approved by the Direção Geral de Veterinária, and the breed register became a genealogical herd-book.

In 2007, the Food and Agriculture Organization of the United Nations listed the conservation status of the Maronesa as "not at risk". At the end of 2016 there were 4777 breeding cows registered in the herd-book; the total population was estimated at 8300–9900, and in 2023 there were 4739 adult cows and 158 bulls in the hands of 810 breeders Threats to the Maronesa include the falling number of keepers of the breed, their increasing mean age, and changes in the tax regulations.

== Characteristics ==
The Maronesa is traditional rustic cattle breed. It shows morphological similarity to the Portuguese fighting bull, the Brava de Lide, with marked sexual dimorphism: mature bulls are larger than cows, have a more heavily muscled neck, and tend to show more development in the foreparts compared with the rectangular body outline of cows and bullocks.

The usual colour is black with a chestnut dorsal stripe, but many cows are chestnut-brown. There is a pale ring round the muzzle; the muzzle and mucosa are black. The head is broad and short, and the profile straight. The horns extend horizontally from the skull, then point forwards and downwards so that they are almost parallel to the facial profile. The dewlap is well developed. In cows, the udder is covered in fine hair.

== Use ==
The traditional use of the Maronesa was for draught power. Since 1996, beef and veal from Maronesa animals reared by eco-friendly methods in a defined and approximately circular area extending northwards from Vila Real – the area of the Serra do Alvão, the Serra da Padrela and the Serra do Marão – has had DOP status, and may be marketed as "Carne Maronesa DOP". The calving rate is low, at about 75 per 100 cows. Approximately 80% of cows are naturally bred and 20% artificially inseminated.
