= Vilar do Monte =

Vilar do Monte may refer to the following parishes in Portugal:

- Vilar do Monte (Barcelos), a parish in the municipality of Barcelos
- Vilar do Monte (Macedo de Cavaleiros), a parish in the municipality of Macedo de Cavaleiros
- Vilar do Monte (Ponte de Lima), a parish in the municipality of Ponte de Lima
