= Trás-os-Montes =

- Region
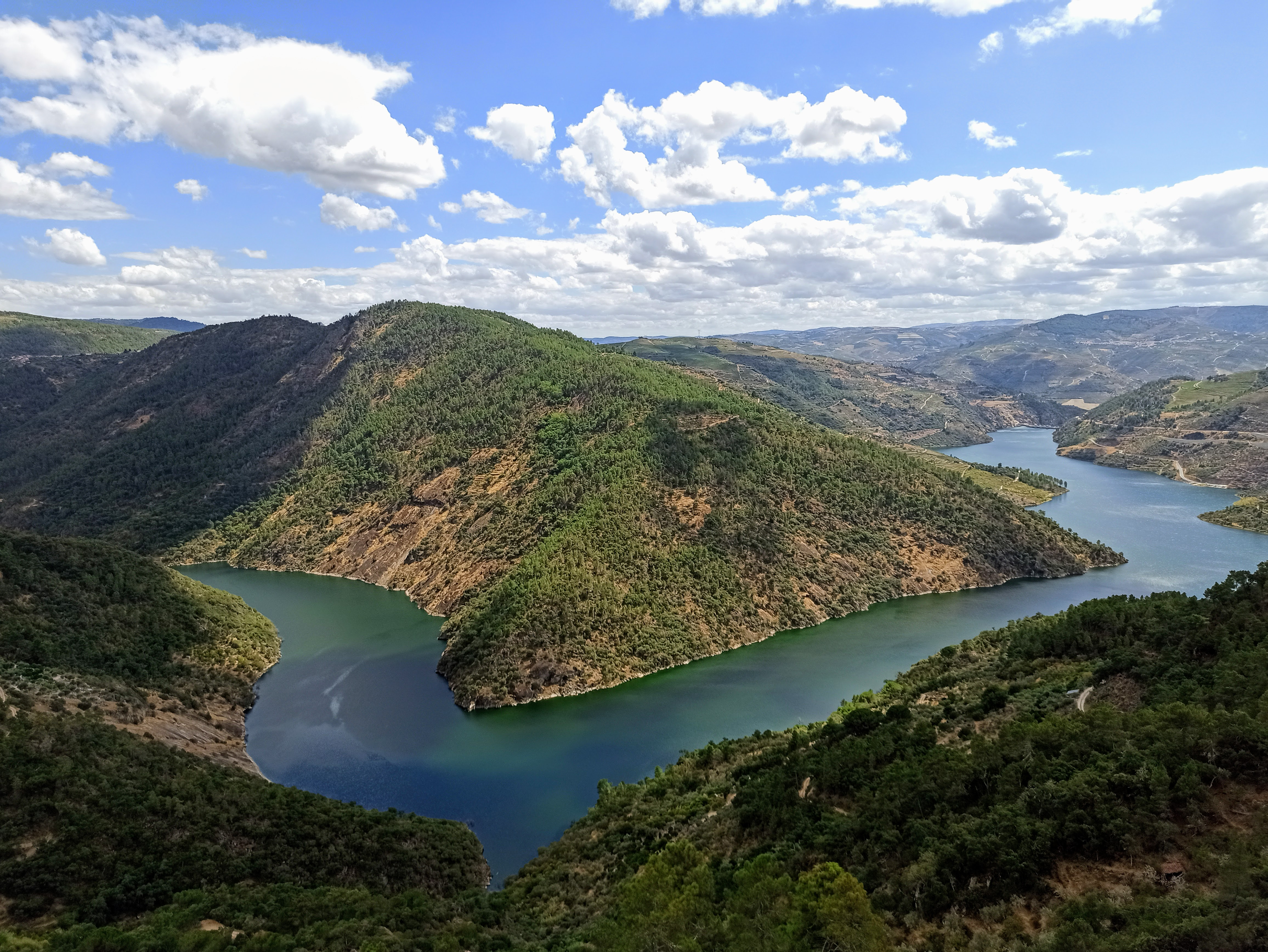
- Tua Valley, Alijó

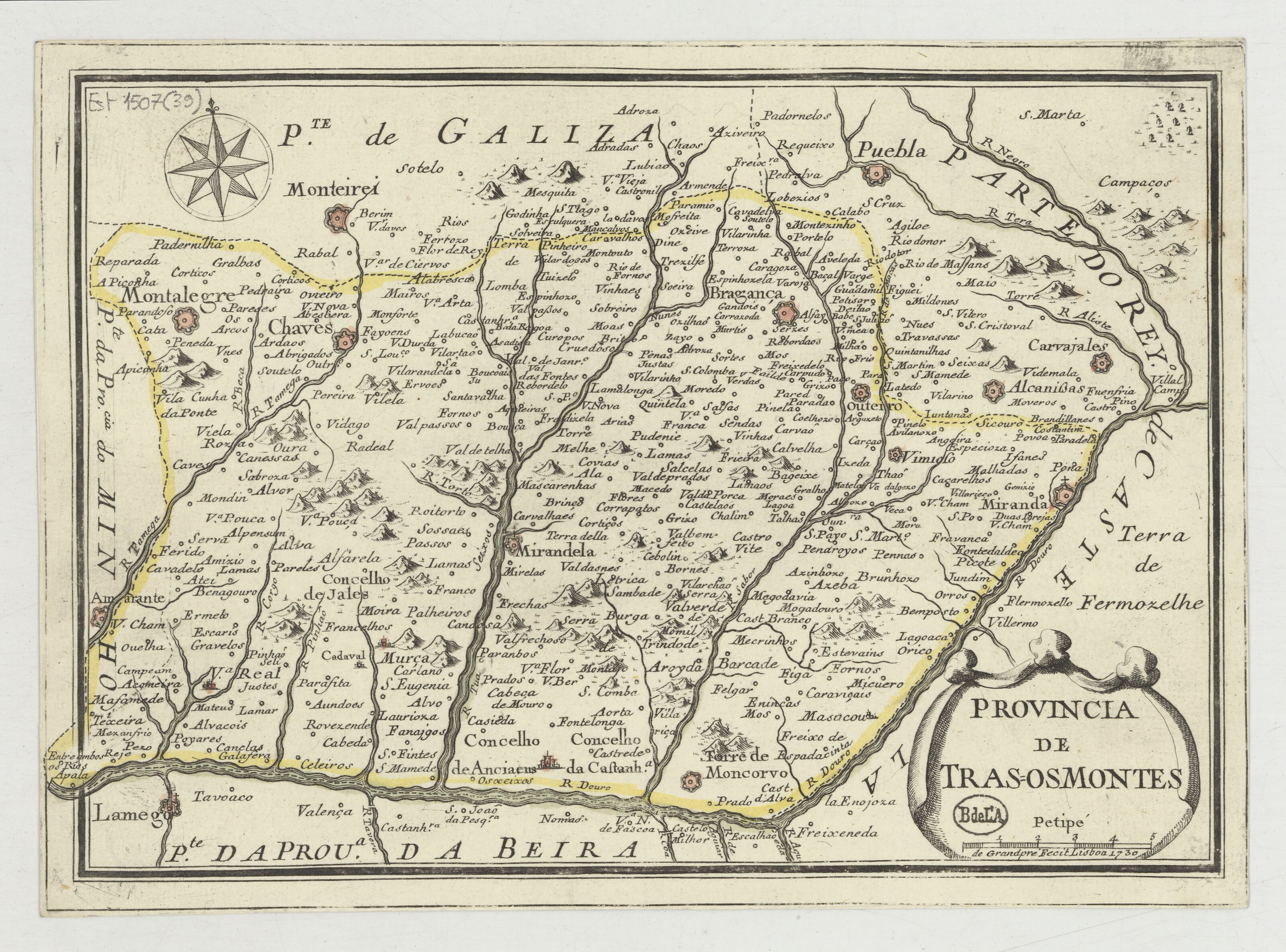
- Administrative borders of the region
- Coordinates: 41°29′N 7°13′W
- Country: Portugal
- Districts: Bragança, Vila Real
- Demonym(s): Transmontano (Portuguese), Stramuntano (Mirandese)

Trás-os-Montes (Portuguese pronunciation: [ˌtɾaz uʒ ˈmõtɨʃ] Mirandese: Trás-ls-Muntes [ˌtɾaz̺ (ə)ɫs̺ ˈmũtəs̺] is a geographical, historical and cultural region of Portugal.

Portuguese for "behind the mountains", Trás-os-Montes is located northeast of the country in an upland area, landlocked by the Douro and Tâmega rivers to south and west and by the Spanish communities of Galicia and Castile and León to the north and east. This relative isolation has led to the survival of cultural traditions that mark the Portuguese identity. On the other hand, its relative continentality also contributed to the lack of development, which led its inhabitants to seek better conditions on the coast or emigrate to Brazil and to other European countries such as France, Luxembourg and Switzerland.

== Geography ==
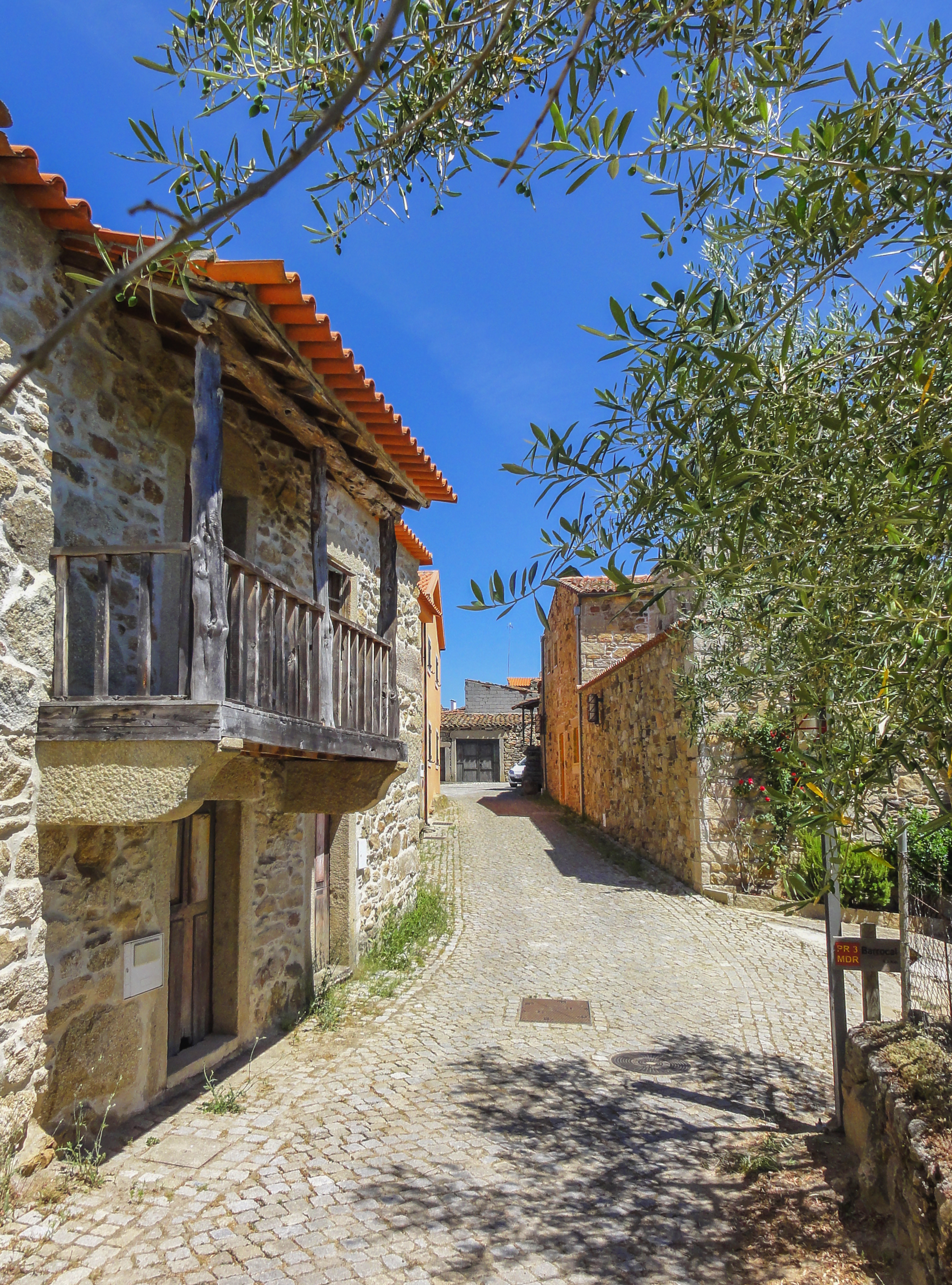
Typical architecture of Trás-os-Montes, in Picote, Miranda do Douro, Douro International Natural Park

The name of Trás-os-Montes refers to the location to the east of mountains such as Marão, Alvão and Gerês, which separate the interior from the coast, and which form a valley around the Douro River. These natural barriers have kept this region of Portugal depopulated and poor for several centuries, being the reason that many of its inhabitants were forced to emigrate to the coast or to other countries such as Brazil, France, Luxembourg or Switzerland.

Though the boundaries have slightly changed since its creation, traditionally, the territory comprising Trás-os-Montes is limited up north with Galicia, to the east with Castile and León, to the west with the Tâmega River and to the south with the Douro River.

Geomorphologically the mountainous Trás-os-Montes region forms a continuum with the Galician Massif, so that it is considered as a whole under the name 'Galicia-Trás-os-Montes Zone'.

This region is made up of two main districts, both to the right (north) of the Douro River: Vila Real and Bragança, included as part of the North Region of Portugal, the other district is made up of 5 other municipalities in the south of the Douro River, all of them included in Viseu and Guarda, all of them being part of the Central region

The most important cities in the region are: Vila Real, Bragança, Chaves, Mirandela, Macedo de Cavaleiros, Lamego, Peso da Régua, Miranda do Douro and Valpaços. All of them are relatively small and populated with less than 50,000 inhabitants. Many people in this region live in small towns. Traditionally these villages were disconnected from the coast due to the lack of good roads, and thus suffered the effects of poverty and isolation. In these cases it can be understood that immigration was the only solution. Today the situation has improved with better roads and communications, but most populations continue to lose population, especially young people who prefer to go to large cities where there are usually more amenities and more opportunities to run a career.

In the small villages, agricultural activity is maintained at a good pace, so that it is still possible to obtain good: corn, wheat, olive oil, chestnuts and some delicate grapes widely used in the production of wine from the region (called port wine) as well as a large number of natural agricultural products. Granite and mineral water are also very important industries in the region.

=== Climate ===
Trás-os-Montes is known by locals as the land of "10 months of winter and 2 months of hell" (dez meses de inverno e dois meses de inferno). The region has always been divided into two climatic zones, known as the Terra Fria (Cold Land) and the Terra Quente (Hot Land). The Terra Fria is the area with very cold and prolonged winters, with warm to hot and dry summers, while the Terra Quente has shorter winters, although equally cold, with very hot and dry summers that show their influence even in spring and fall, they are shorter than normal.

Due to its continentality, Trás-os-Montes has the coldest winters in Portugal, with January temperatures varying between 7–11 °C (45–52 °F) during the day and 0–3 °C (32–37 °F) during the night; and has rather hot summers, with July and August temperatures varying between 26–32 °C (79–90 °F) during the day and 12–15 °C (54–59 °F) during the night, 33–34 °C (91–93 °F) in low-lying valleys. The overall climate is Mediterranean, but rainfall is much more distributed throughout the year than in other regions of Portugal, making it relatively close to an oceanic or humid subtropical climate. This region is also more prone to summer thunderstorms than any other place in the country, due to its distance from the Azores High. Two cities from Trás-os-Montes, Chaves and Bragança also hold the record for the highest air pressure ever recorded in Portugal, 1050.3 hPa.

=== Nature ===
Trás-os-Montes stands out mainly for its landscape contrasts. To the north is the Montesinho Natural Park, to the east the Douro International Natural Park, bordering Spain, to the northwest the Peneda-Gerês National Park, to the east the Marão and Alvão mountains and to the south the region of Alto Douro Vinhateiro, declared a World Heritage Site by Unesco on December 14, 2001. The northeast of the region is declared a biosphere reserve by Unesco under the name of Meseta Ibérica.

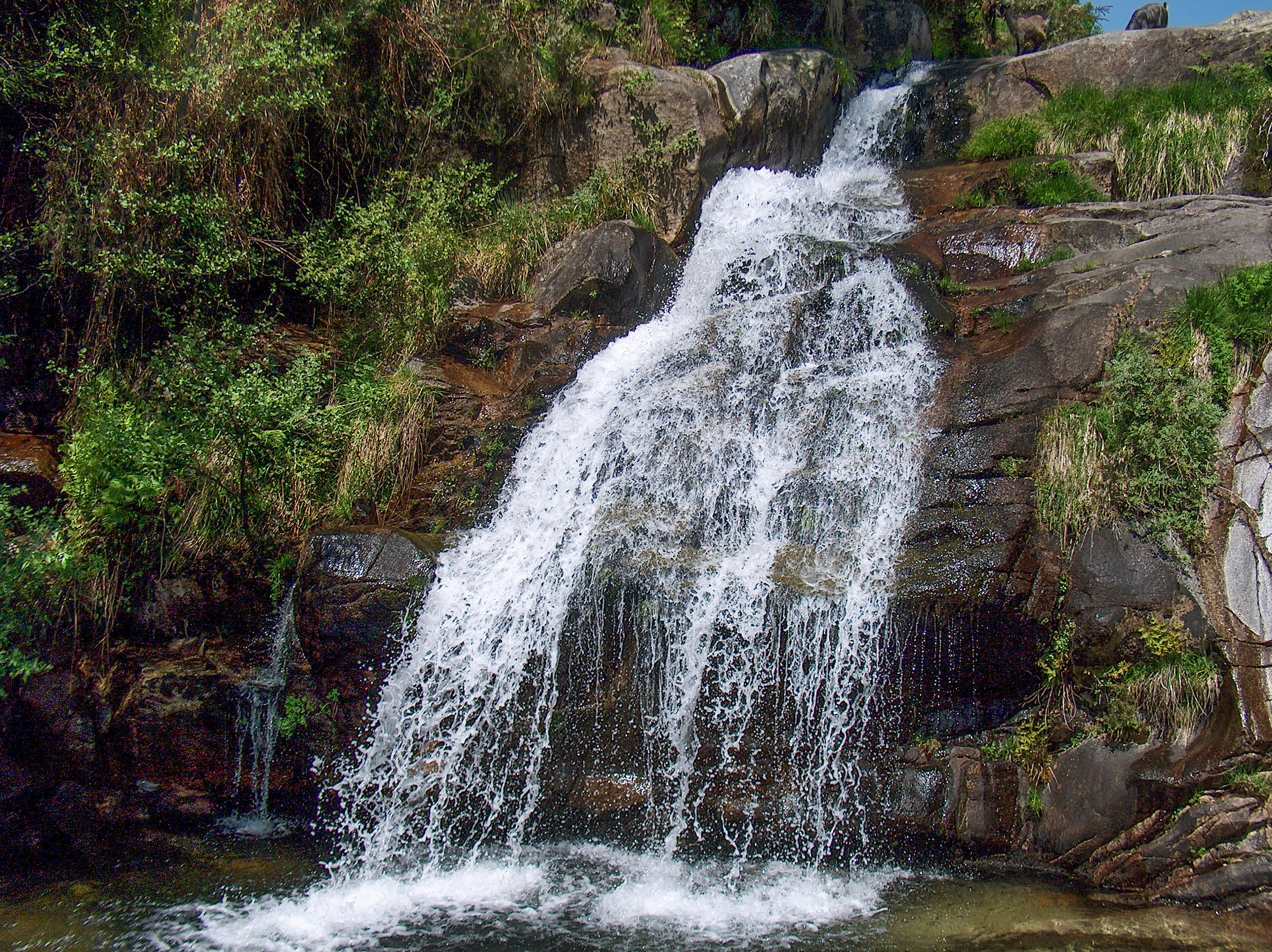
Serra do Alvão

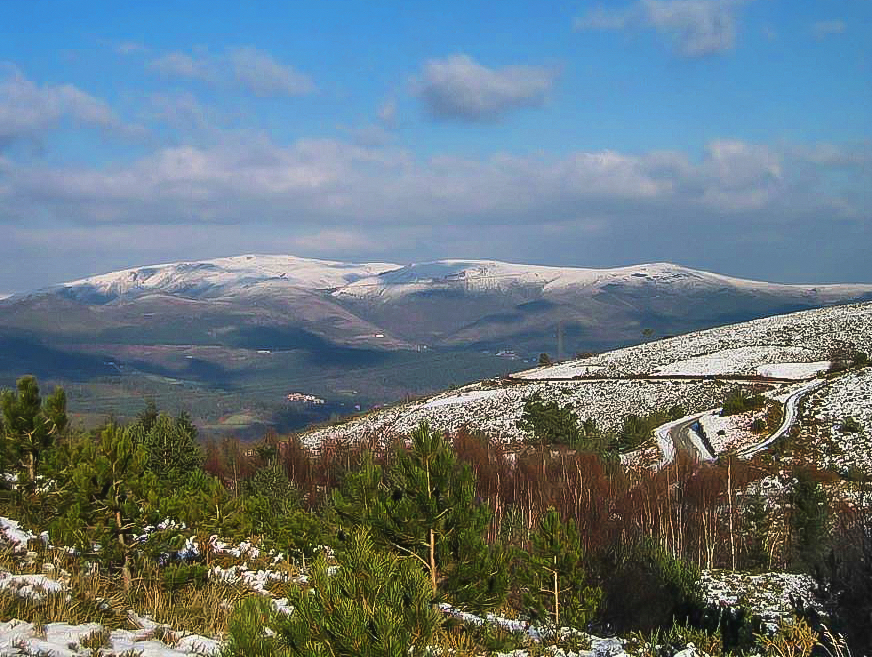
Serra do Marão

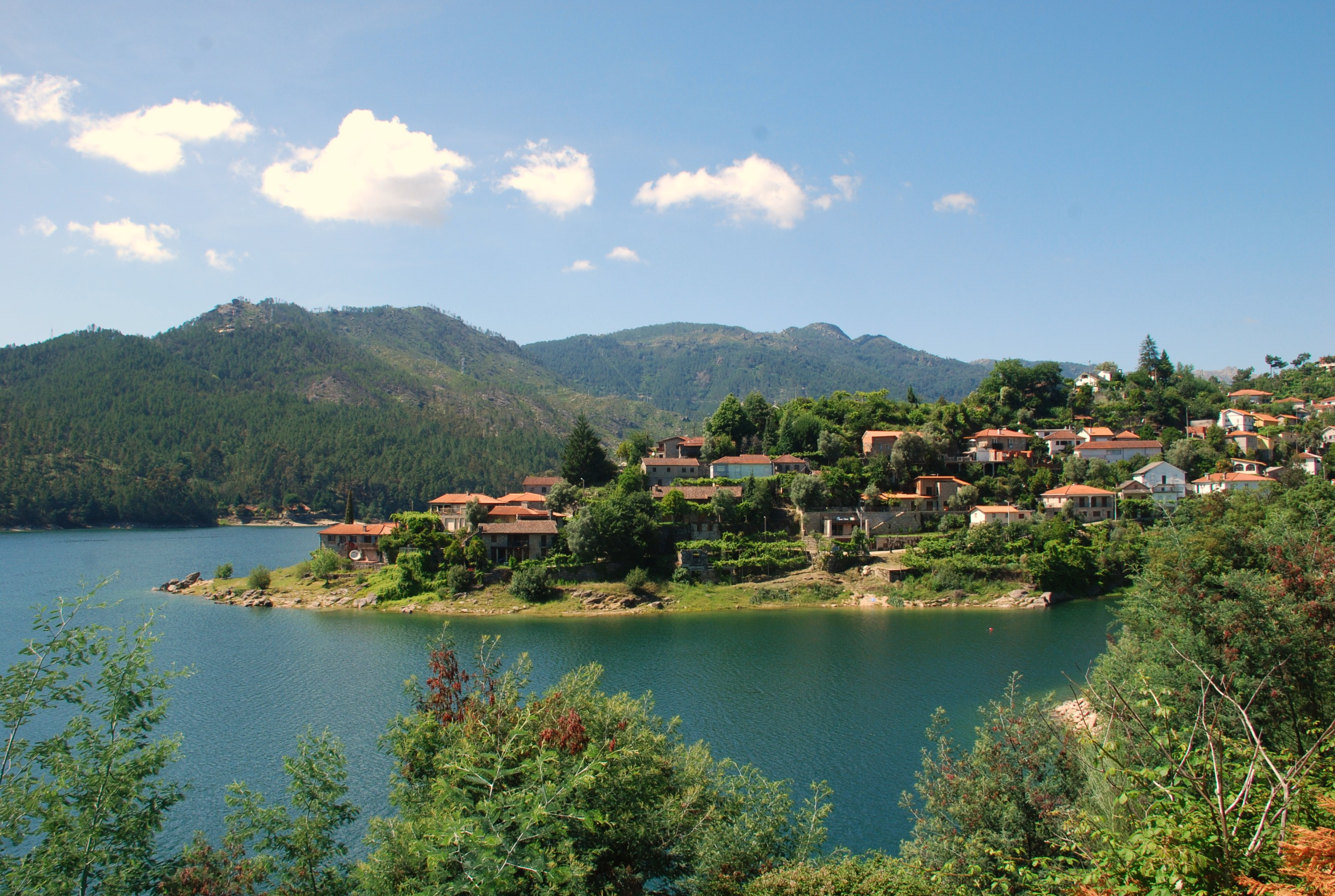
Peneda-Gerês

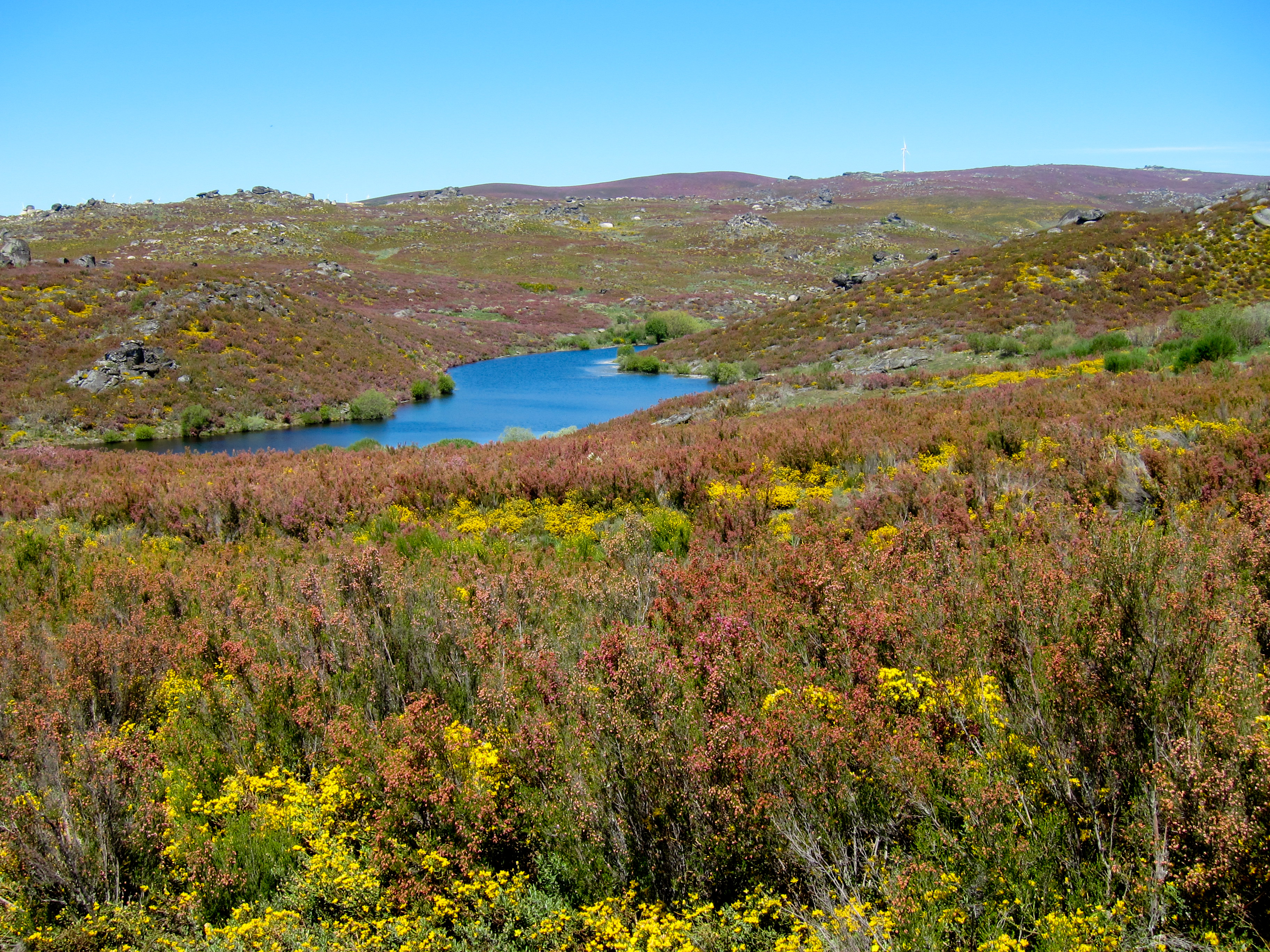
Montesinho

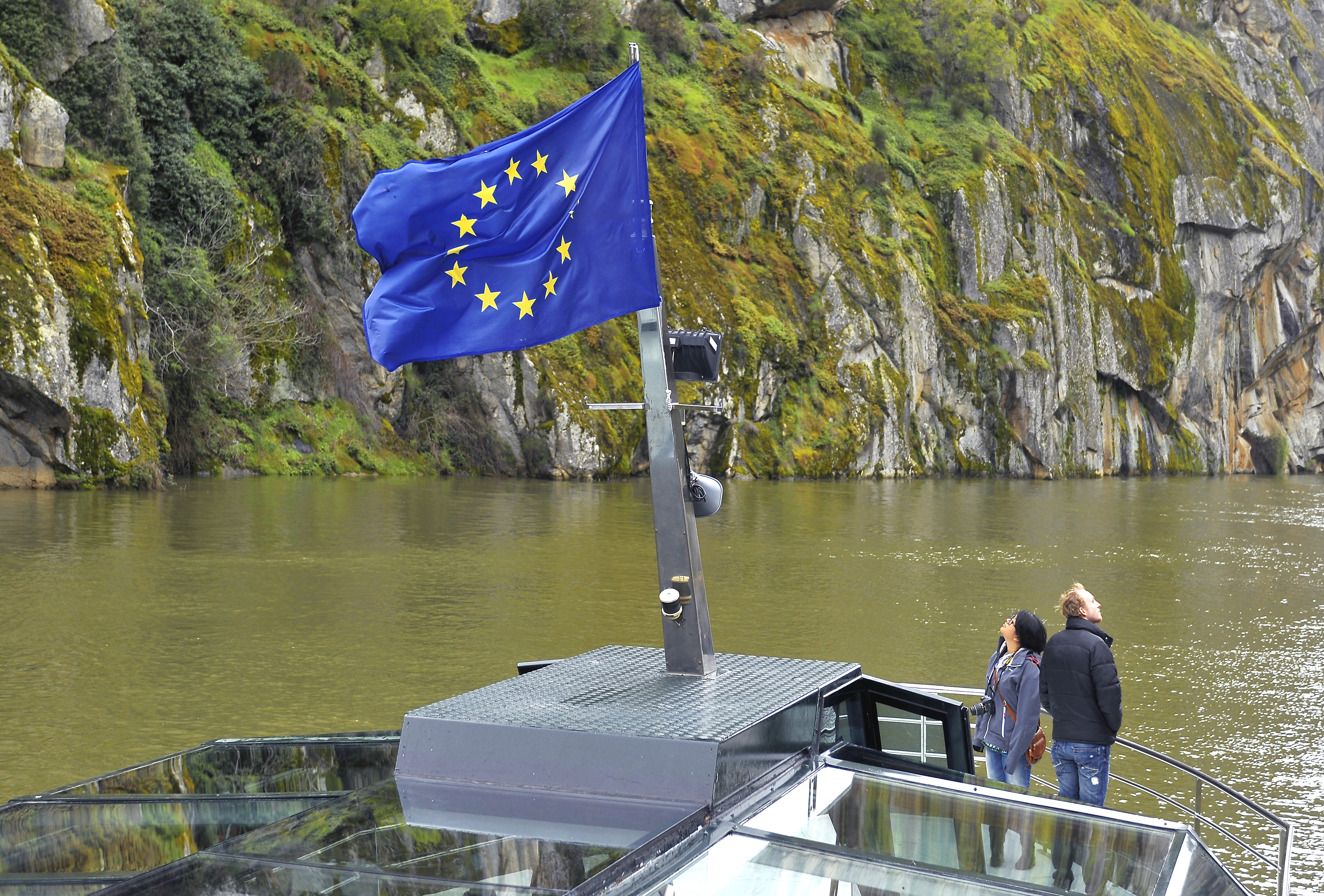
Douro International

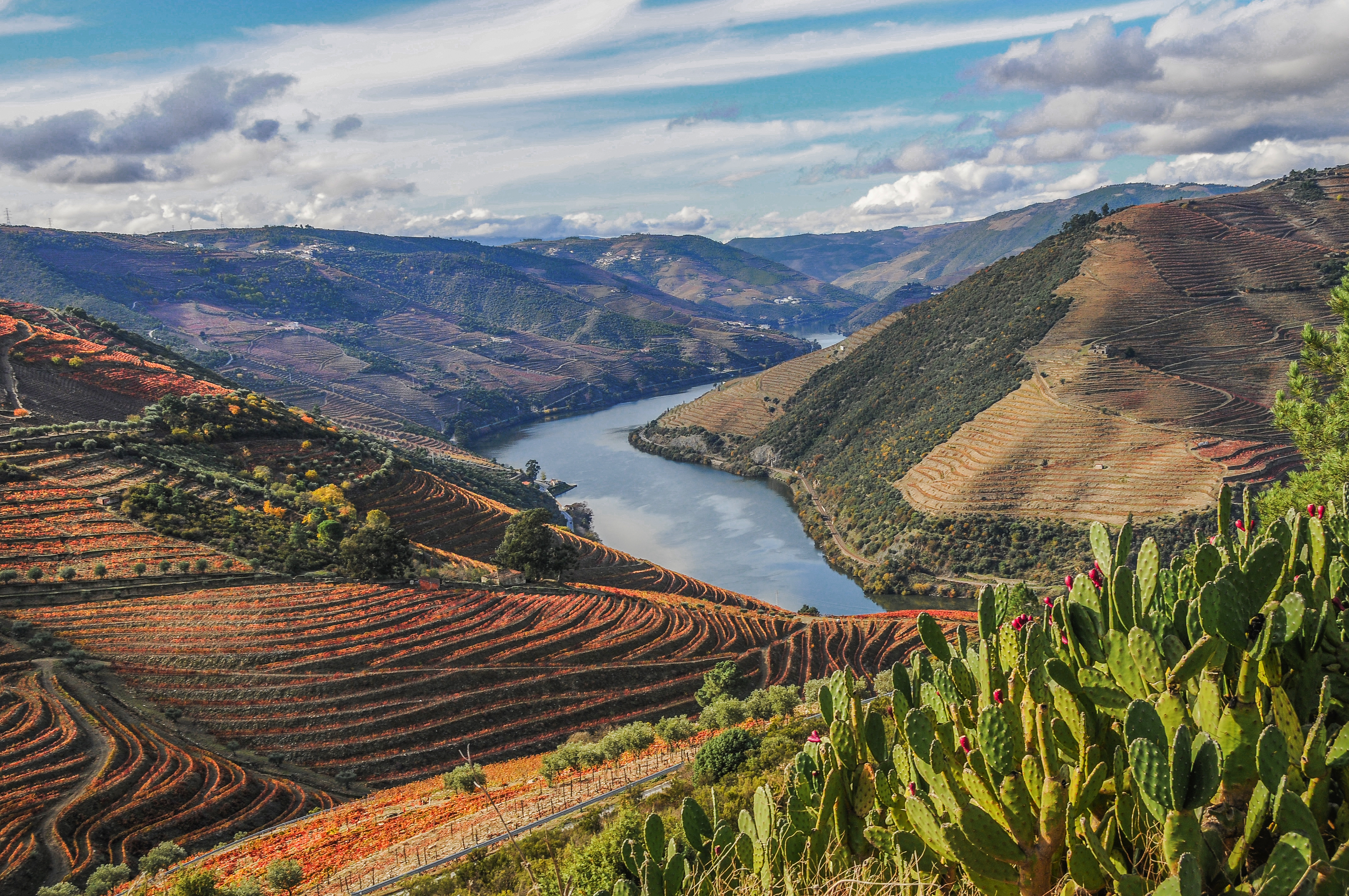
Alto Douro Vinhateiro

=== Hydrography ===
The Douro is the most outstanding river in this territory and the backbone of the relief and the geographical and human disposition. The following important rivers yield their waters to it: the Sabor River, the Tua River and the Corgo River, whose courses served to channel rail transport in the region. Another important river is the Tâmega, which serves as the boundary of the region to the west. One of its tributaries is the Rabagão River, which also serves to delimit the region and on which the Alto Rabagão and Venda Nova reservoirs are built. In the Azibo River, a tributary of the Sabor, the Azibo reservoir is established, a protected natural area of tourist interest. The Sabor river gives rise to the Baixo Sabor reservoir, one of the largest in the region. Nearby are those located in the International Douro: Castro, Miranda, Picote, Bemposta, Aldeadávila and Saucelle. Half of Portuguese ownership and the other half Spanish.

Undoubtedly the most important hydroelectric infrastructure in the region is the Alto Douro Vinhateiro navigation channel, which makes it possible for tourist cruises to transit from Porto to the Spanish border at Barca d’Alva. It is possible thanks to the locks of the Pocinho, Valeira, Régua, Carrapatelo and Crestuma-Lever dams.

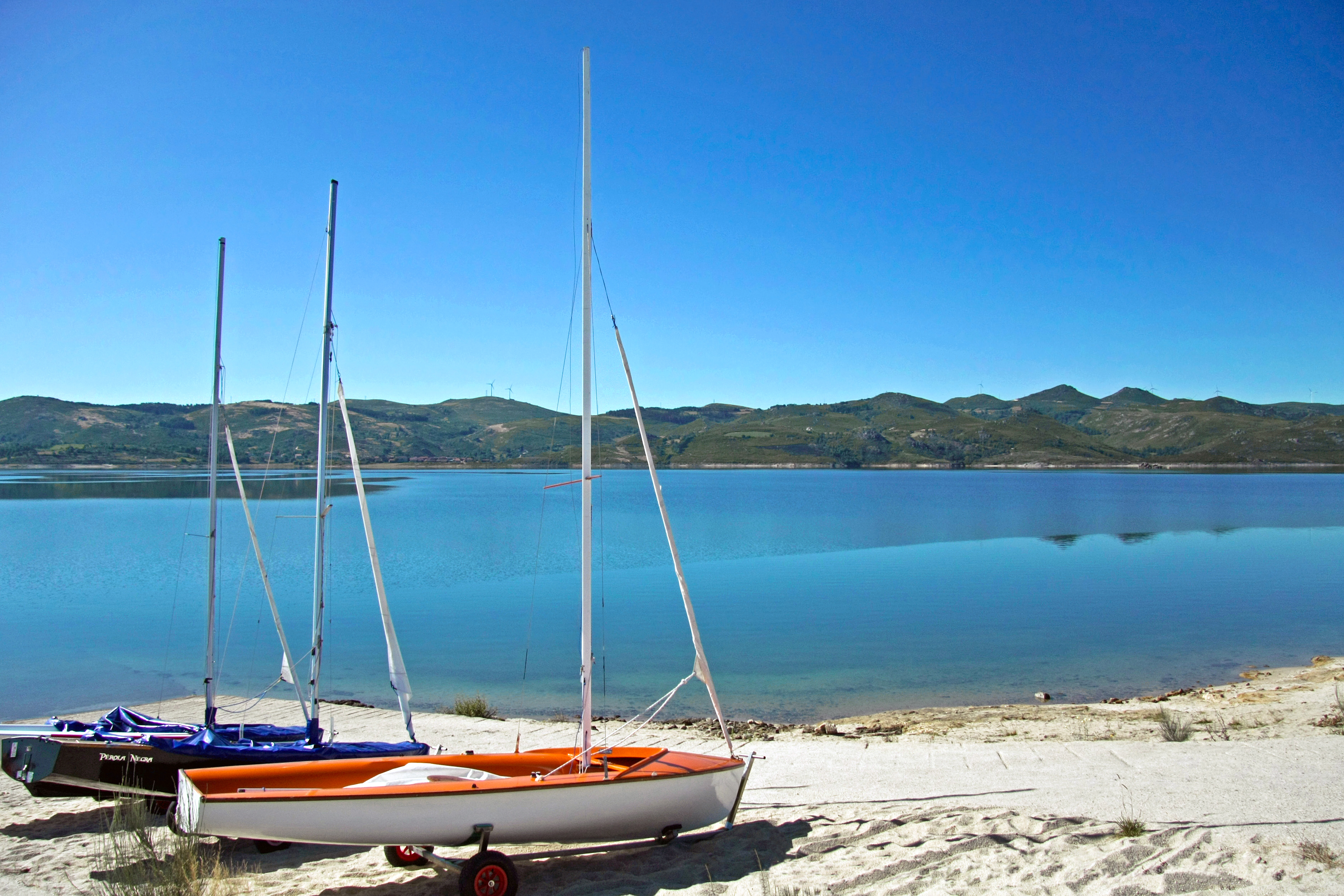
Alto Rabagão Dam

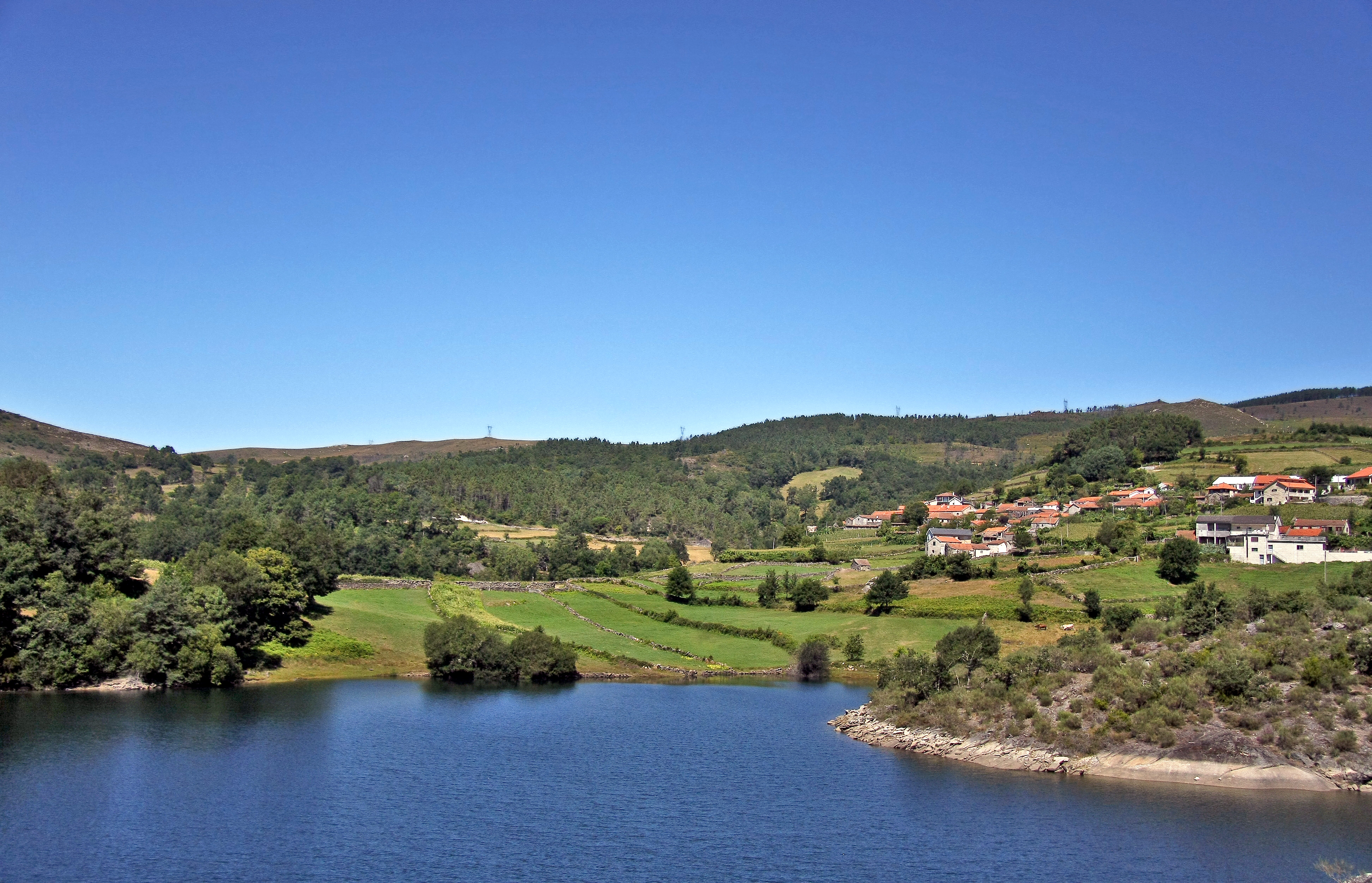
Venda Nova Dam

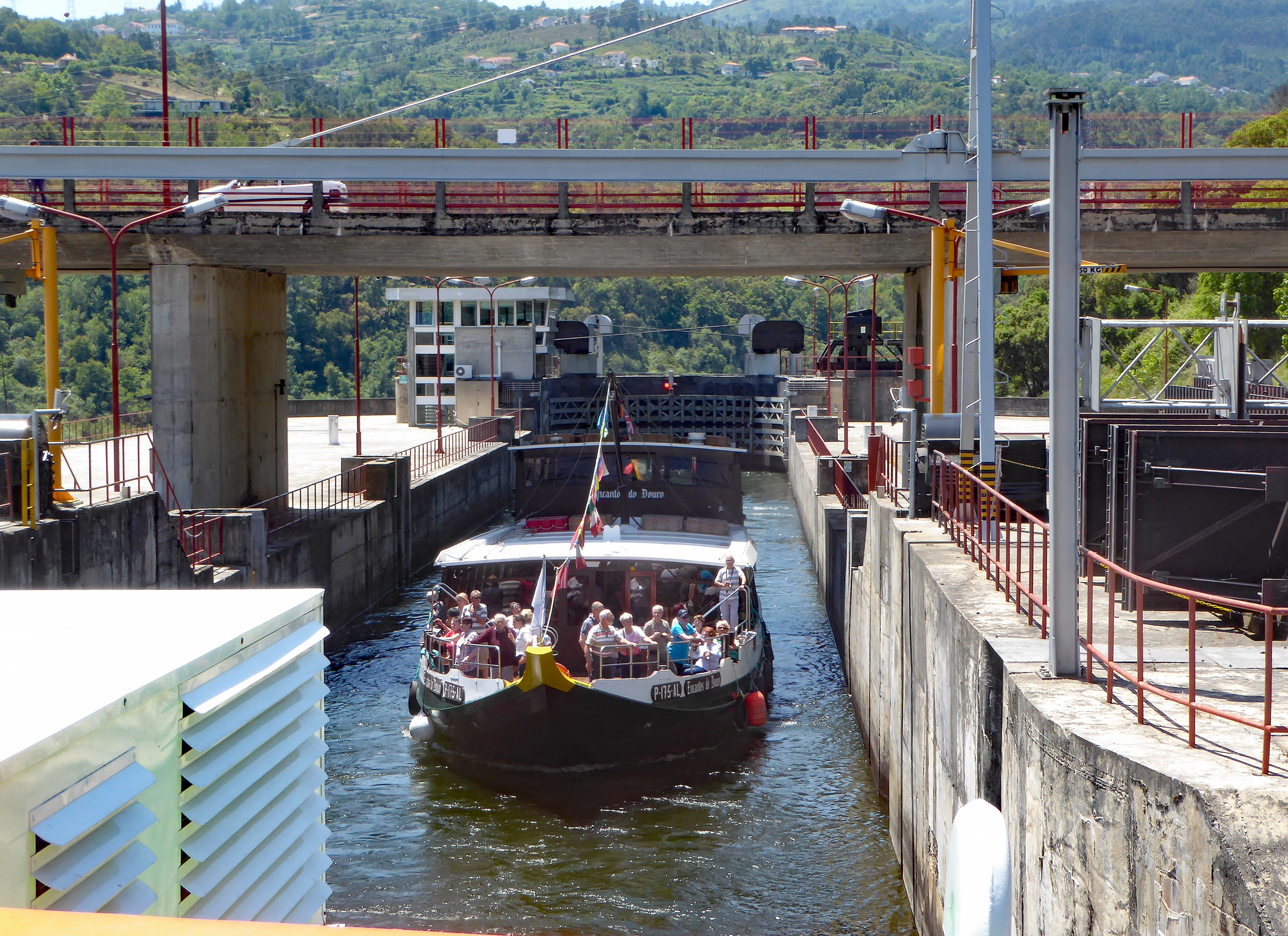
Carrapatelo Lock

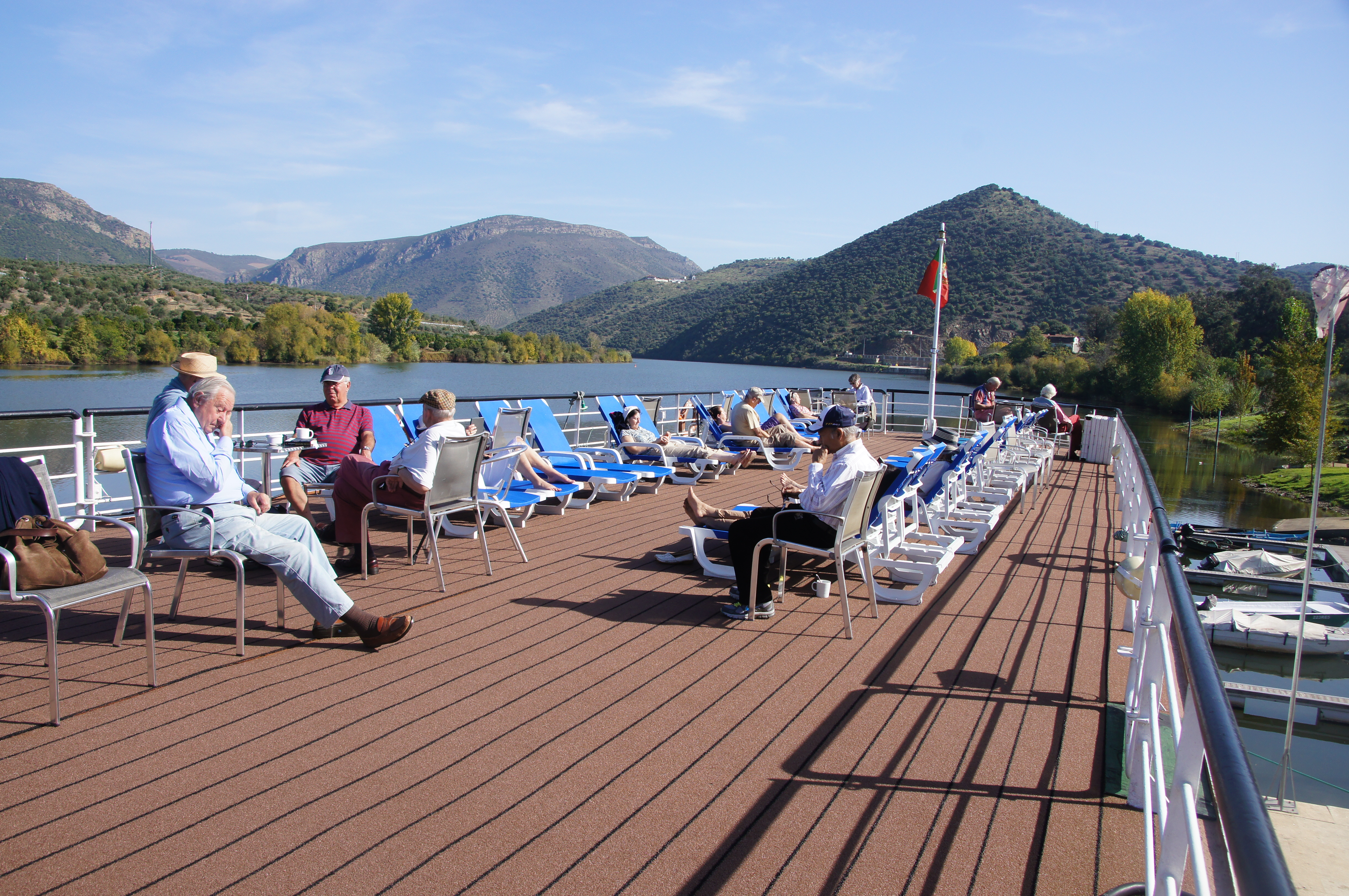
Cruise on the Douro

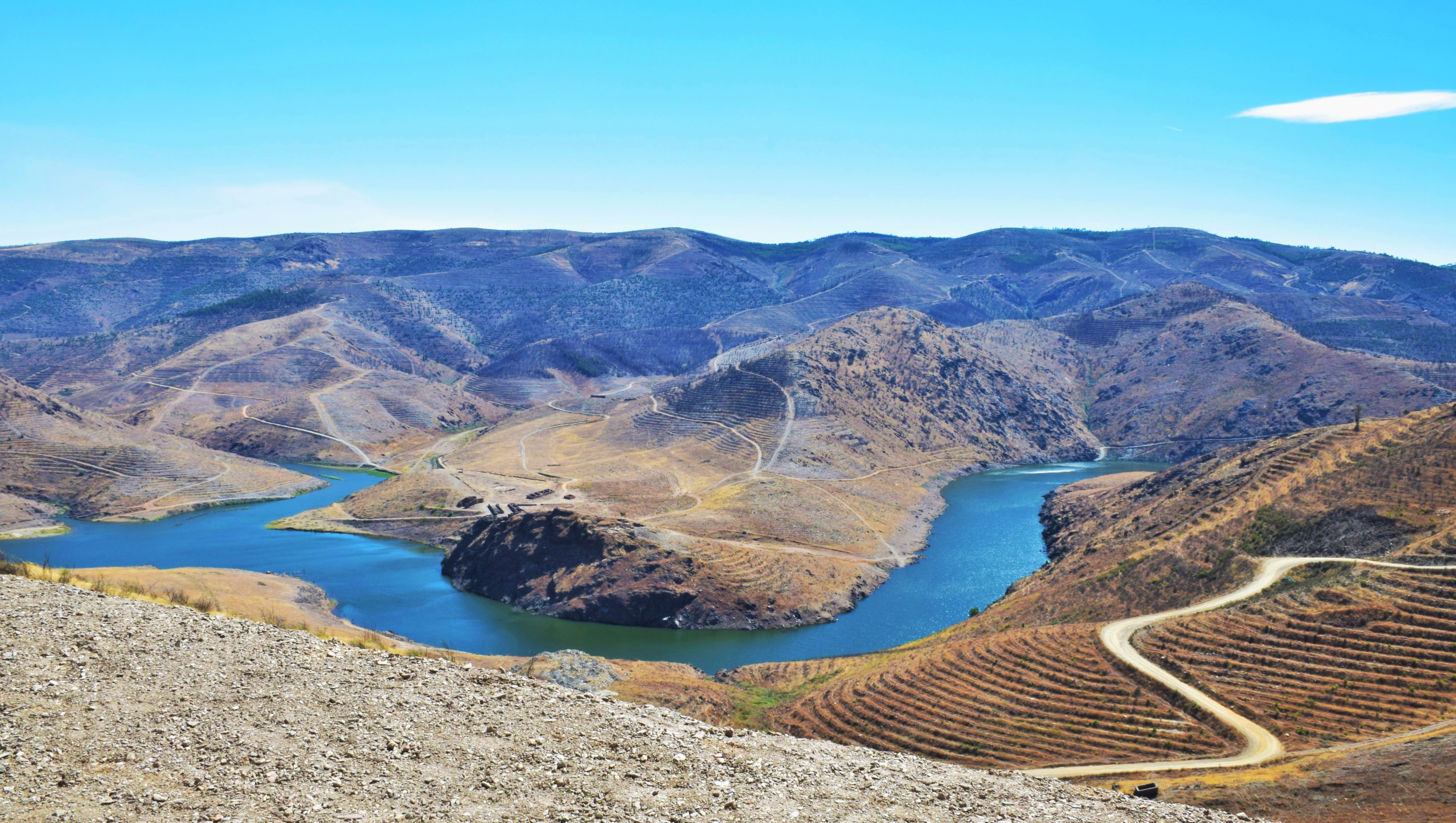
Baixo Sabor Dam

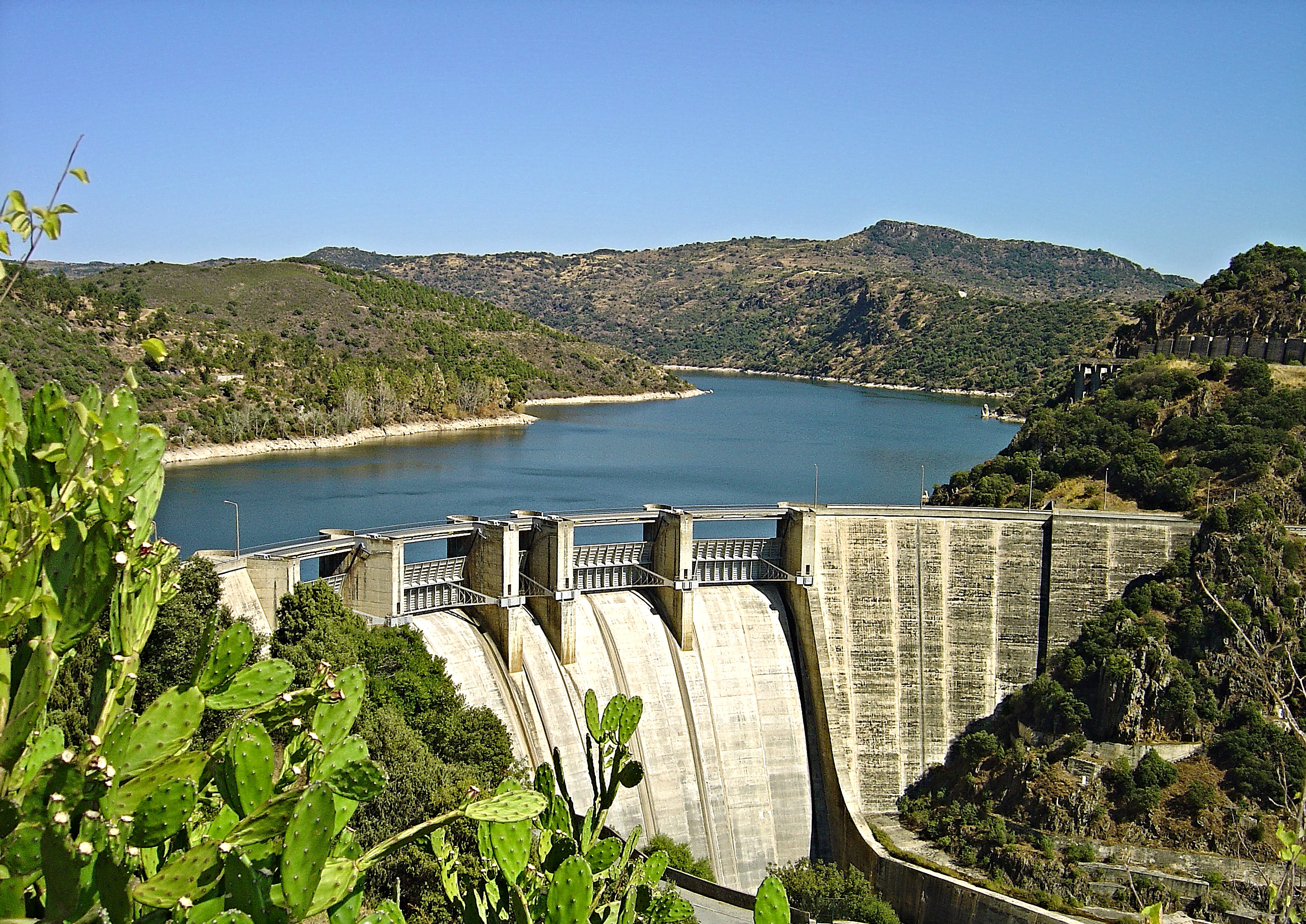
Bemposta Dam

== Culture ==
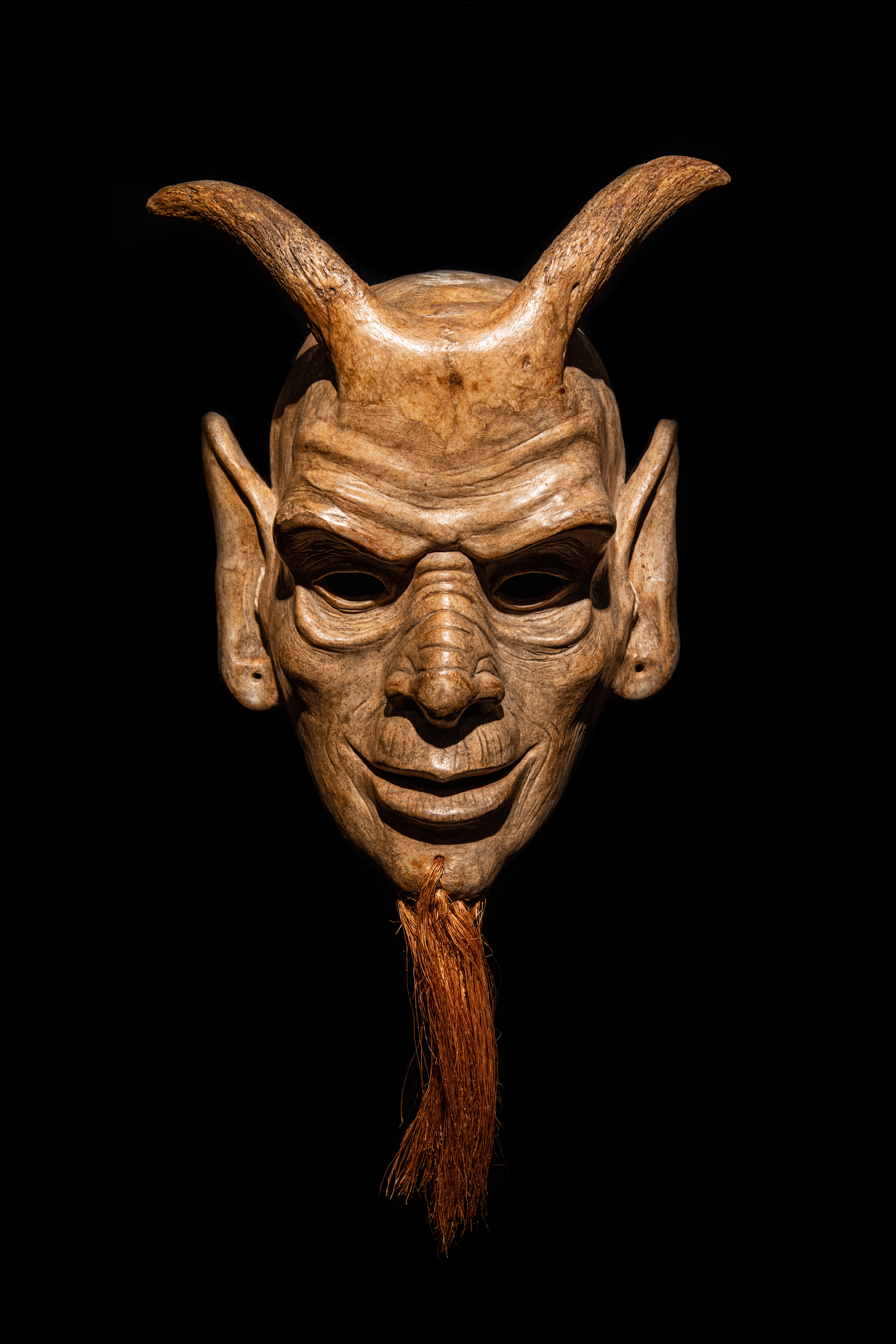
Mask Diabo used on folk fest of Carnaval.

=== Asturleonese influence ===
In addition to Portuguese, in the northeastern corner of the region, known as Tierra de Miranda, Mirandese is spoken, a dialect of the Asturian language, which is officially recognized in Trás-os-Montes under Law No. 7 / 99, of January 29, 1999, of official recognition of the linguistic rights of the Miranda community. It is spoken by about 15,000 people in the municipalities of Miranda do Douro, Mogadouro and Vimioso. International organizations such as SIL International grant it its own code, others such as Unesco frame it within the Asturian language.

=== Caretos de Podence ===
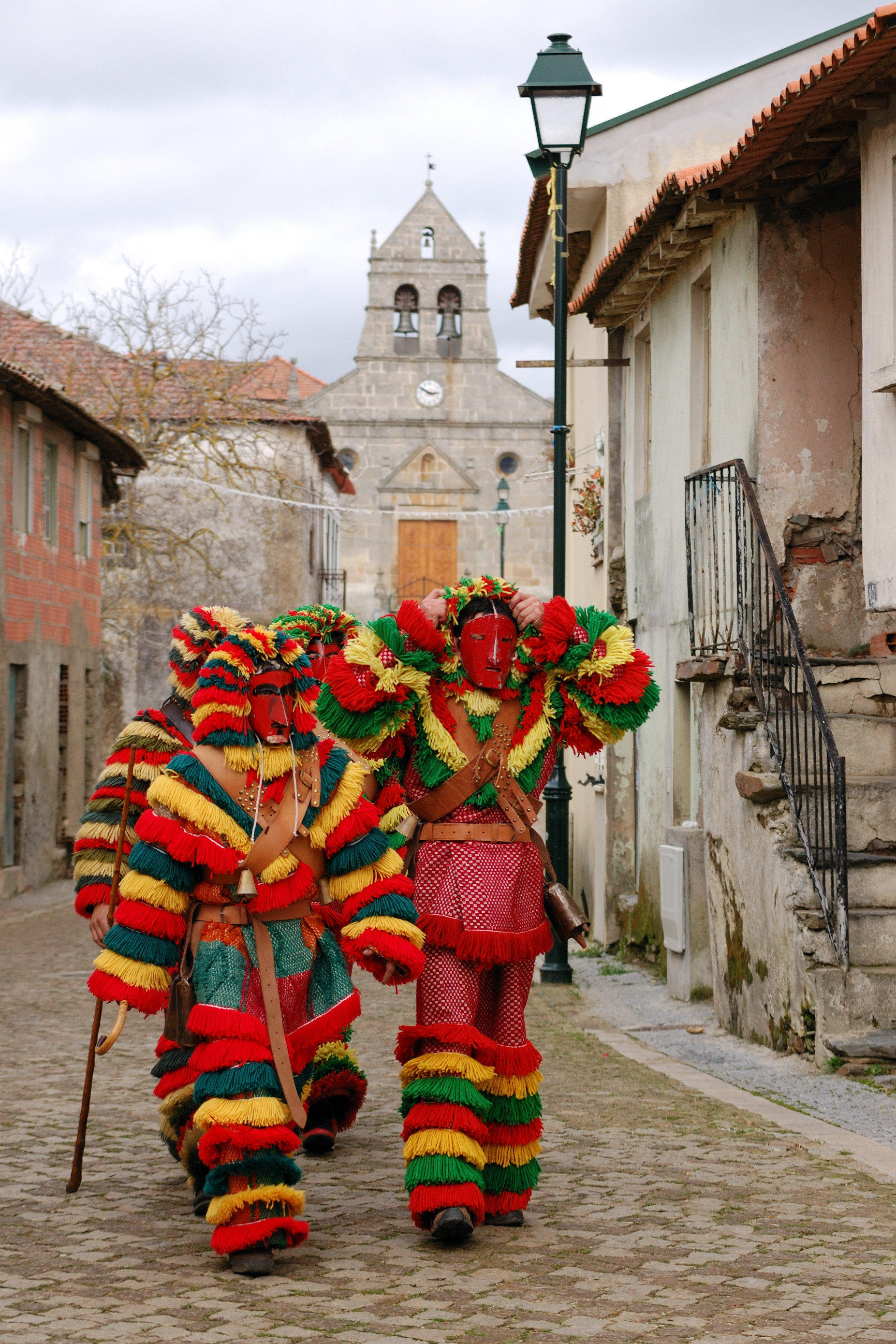
Group of Caretos in the streets of the village of Podence

Caretos de Podence is a masquerade held in the town of Podence, belonging to the municipality of Macedo de Cavaleiros, which has been declared Intangible Cultural Heritage of Humanity by Unesco. Inserted in the winter festivals, so characteristic in the Trás-os-Montes region, the Caretos represent diabolical and mysterious images that every year, since time immemorial, have been out on the streets at carnival festivals. Interrupting the long silences of each winter, as if secretly and unpredictably emerging from the corners of Podence, the Caretos and their frenzied cowbells appear well crossed in the colored stripes of the thick blankets of their suits.

They are similar to those held in towns in the Spanish Leonese Region such as La Bufa de San Antón in Aldeadávila de la Ribera, in the Province of Salamanca, or El Zangarrón de Montamarta, in the Province of Zamora.

=== Gaita transmontana ===
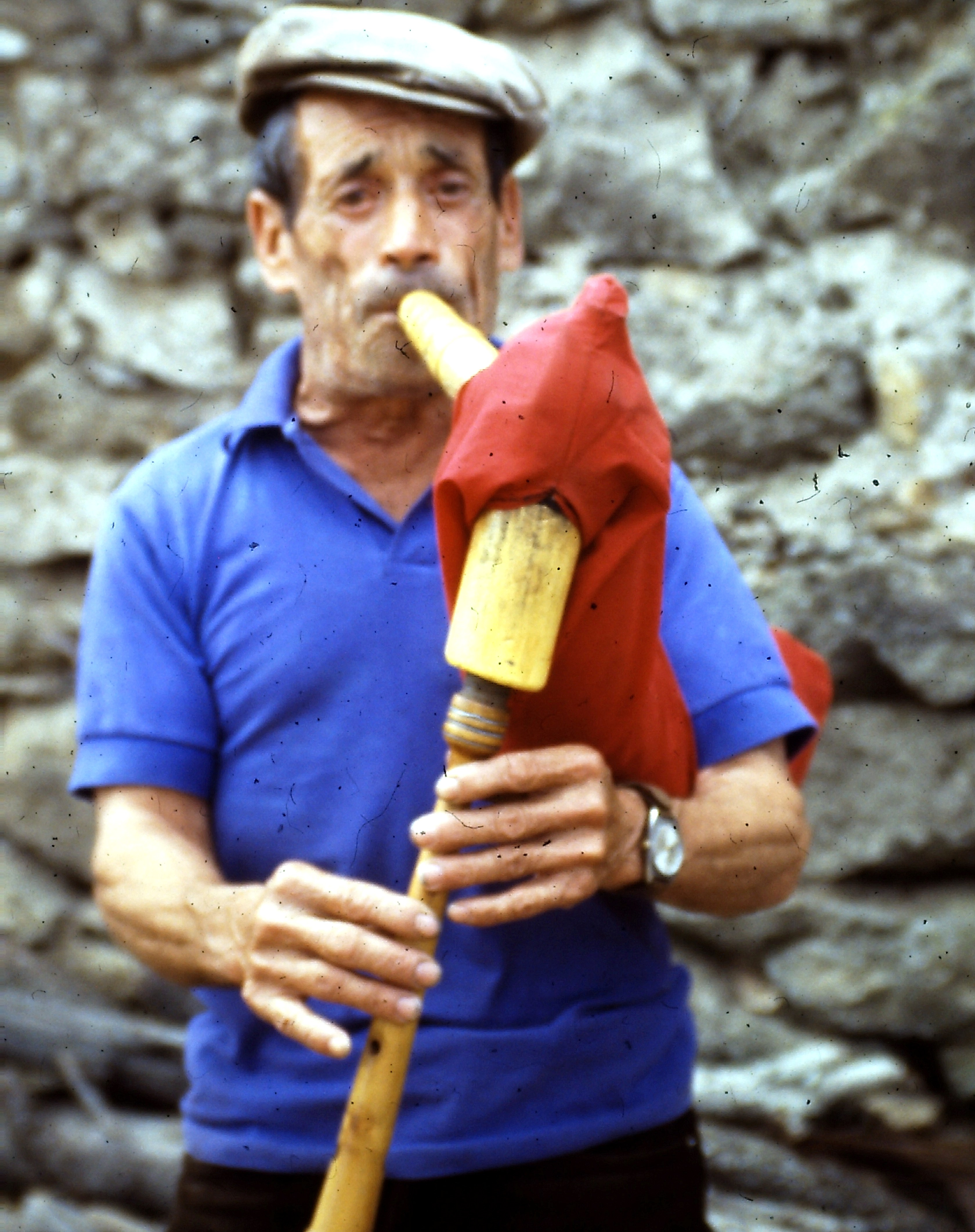
The piper Manuel Francisco Aires, better known as the Tio Pascoal

The gaita transmontana or gaita mirandesa is among the most archaic know bagpipe models, in terms of its tuning and mode.

Contrary to what happens with the Galician bagpipe or the Scottish bagpipe, for example, the mirandesa bagpipe has recently been recovered, so its repertoire is almost all traditional, with few modern compositions. This is due, in part, to the decline of the instrument, whose tradition had been maintained orally and was already being lost. However, today there are many old recordings and collections of this instrument available through the work of many ethnomusicologists. It shares various structural aspects with the sanabresa or alistana bagpipes.

== Cuisine ==
The gastronomy of Trás-os-Montes and Alto Douro reflects the difficulties experienced by the local populations of the region which had to adapt their diet to survive in the desolate region. Much of the local enchidos are made with every part of the animal, lard and bread soups were made, and high durability ingredients, such as chestnuts and casulas (bean pods that were left to dry and then cooked) were used.

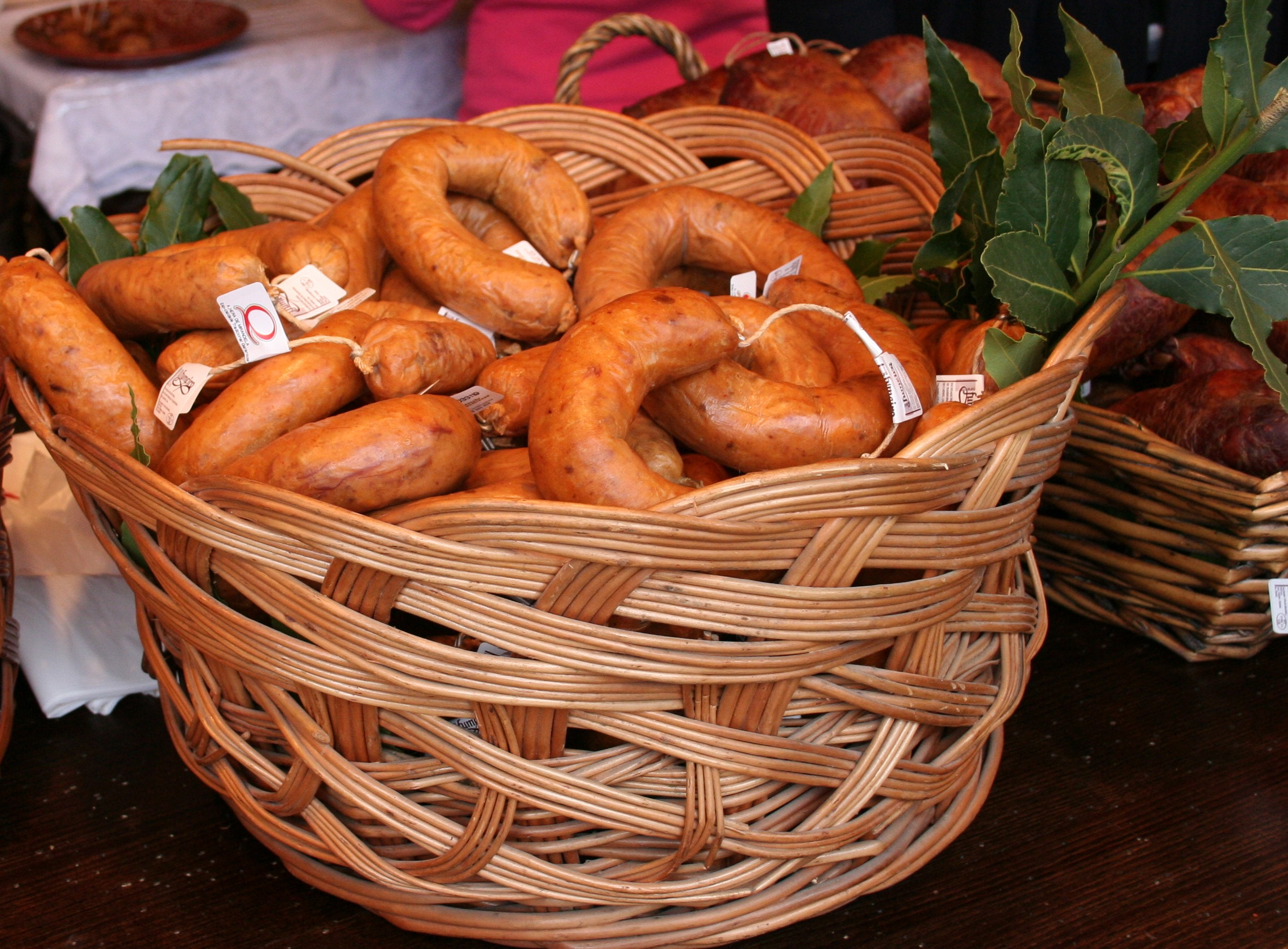
Alheira, a traditional enchido from Trás-os-Montes

Dishes are mostly meat-based, a significant contrast from the average fish-eating habits of the Portuguese. Posta à mirandesa is one of the most recognizable dishes in Trás-os-Montes, along with javali no pote (wild boar), marrã à moda de Mesão Frio (pig), cabrito assado à transmontana or milhos à moda de Trás-os-Montes (similar to a cozido à portuguesa with milho-branco (crushed corn) instead of vegetables); though seafood dishes also made their way in the local cuisine: Bacalhau à bruxa de Valpaços or Polvo à transmontana (octopus) are also well known.

Sweet foods include Doce Teixeira (made with lemon and cinnamon), Pudim de castanha (chestnut pudding), and variants of classic Portuguese recipes such as Papos-de-anjo de Mirandela or Toucinho-do-céu de Murça.

== Administrative history ==
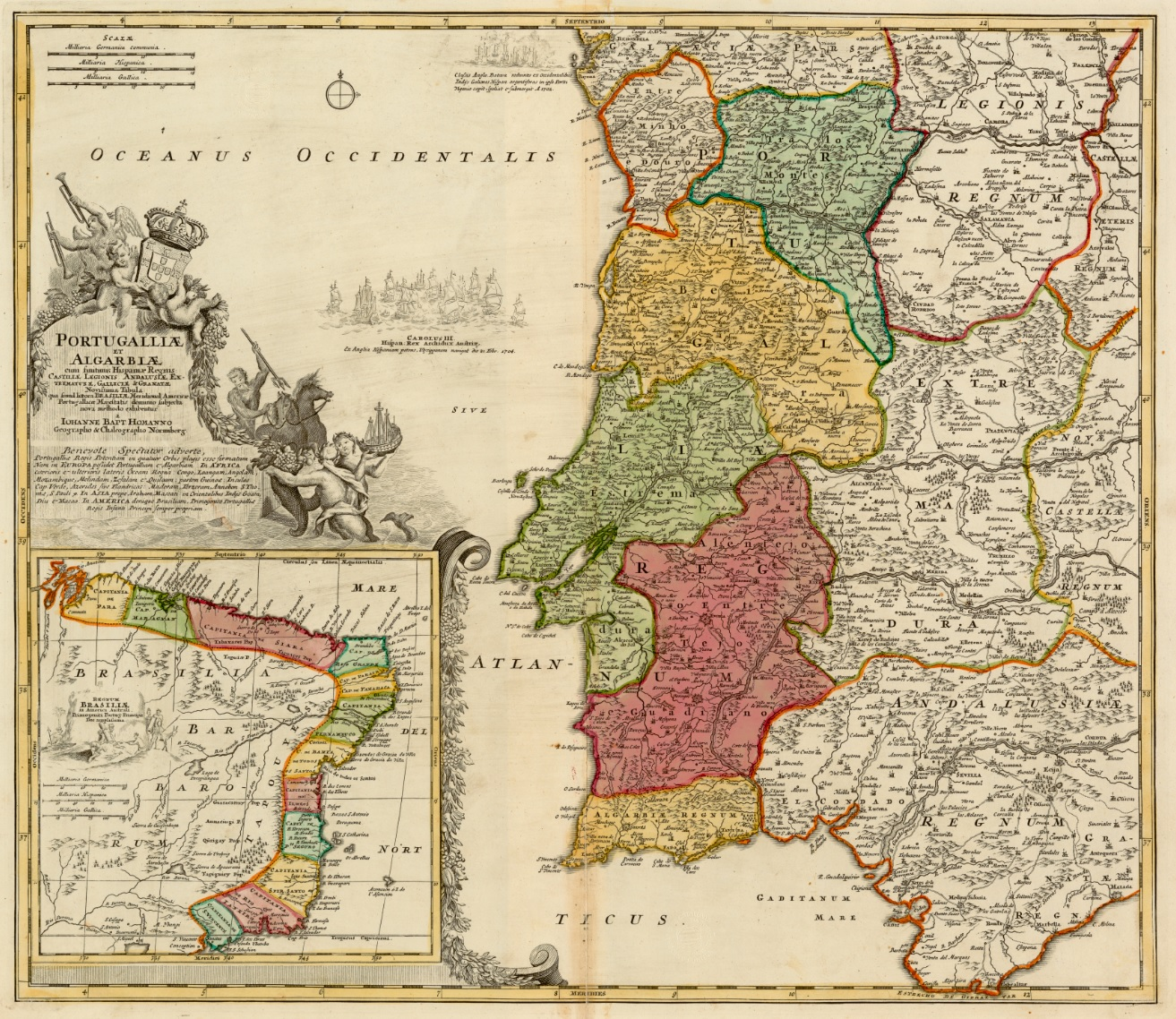
The northeasternmost, then Province of "Tra-los-Montes" seen on a 1710 map of Portugal

Trás-os-Montes was one of the six major administrative divisions into which the territory of Portugal was divided in the 15th century. The division was known as Comarca until the 16th century, from then on to being known as Province.

Until the 17th century, the Province of Trás-os-Montes constituted a correctional office, administered by a corregedor (a magistrate with judicial and administrative functions). At the same time, in the event of war, the province also constituted the area of action of a main frontier, a military commander who was assigned the operational command of the province's troops on campaign.

From the 17th century onwards, the province was divided into several corrections (also called comarcas), each with its own corregedor. The province then became just a statistical unit and a military region commanded by a governor of arms. At the beginning of the 19th century, Trás-os-Montes included the districts of Bragança, Miranda, Torre de Moncorvo and Vila Real. In the interior of its territory, the Ervededo couto was located, which depended on the comarca of Braga (Province of Entre-Douro-e-Minho).

The Province of Trás-os-Montes remained in the administrative division of 1832. At that time, it had a prefect - a magistrate representing the central government - and a provincial general council - a local authority, elected locally. The province was divided into the districts of Bragança, Chaves, Moncorvo and Vila Real. The counties, which were not provincial headquarters, each had a sub-prefect, who represented the prefect.

By the administrative reform of 1835, Portugal was divided into districts. The division into provinces was maintained, but these became mere groupings of districts for statistical and regional reference purposes, without their own bodies. The Province of Trás-os-Montes joined the districts of Bragança and Vila Real.

The province, now named Trás-os-Montes and Alto Douro and encompassing some municipalities on the left bank of the Douro, was reinstated by the administrative reform of 1936, in accordance with the Constitution of 1933 (Estado Novo). The new provinces were created, based on a geographical study by geographer Amorim Girão that identified 13 "natural regions" in the territory of mainland Portugal. The natural region of Trás-os-Montes and the natural region of Alto Douro were grouped into the province of Trás-os-Montes and Alto Douro.

However, the provinces never had any practical attribution, and disappeared from the administrative scene (although not from the daily vocabulary of the Portuguese) with the constitutional revision of 1959, not being recovered by the 1976 Constitution.

The proposal for regionalization subject to a referendum in 1998 (having been rejected) foresaw the creation of the Trás-os-Montes region, in every way the same as the province of 1936, with the exception of including one more municipality (Mêda).

== See also ==
- Trás-os-Montes Province
- Geology of the Iberian Peninsula
- Trás-os-Montes (film)
