= Vale de Prados =

- Civil parish
- Location in Portugal
- Coordinates: 41.550°N 6.947°W
- Country: Portugal
- Region: Norte
- Intermunic. comm.: Terras de Trás-os-Montes
- District: Bragança
- Municipality: Macedo de Cavaleiros

Area
  - Total: 10.37 km^{2} (4.00 sq mi)

Population (2011)
  - Total: 431
  - Density: 41.6/km^{2} (108/sq mi)
- Time zone: UTC+00:00 (WET)
  - Summer (DST): UTC+01:00 (WEST)

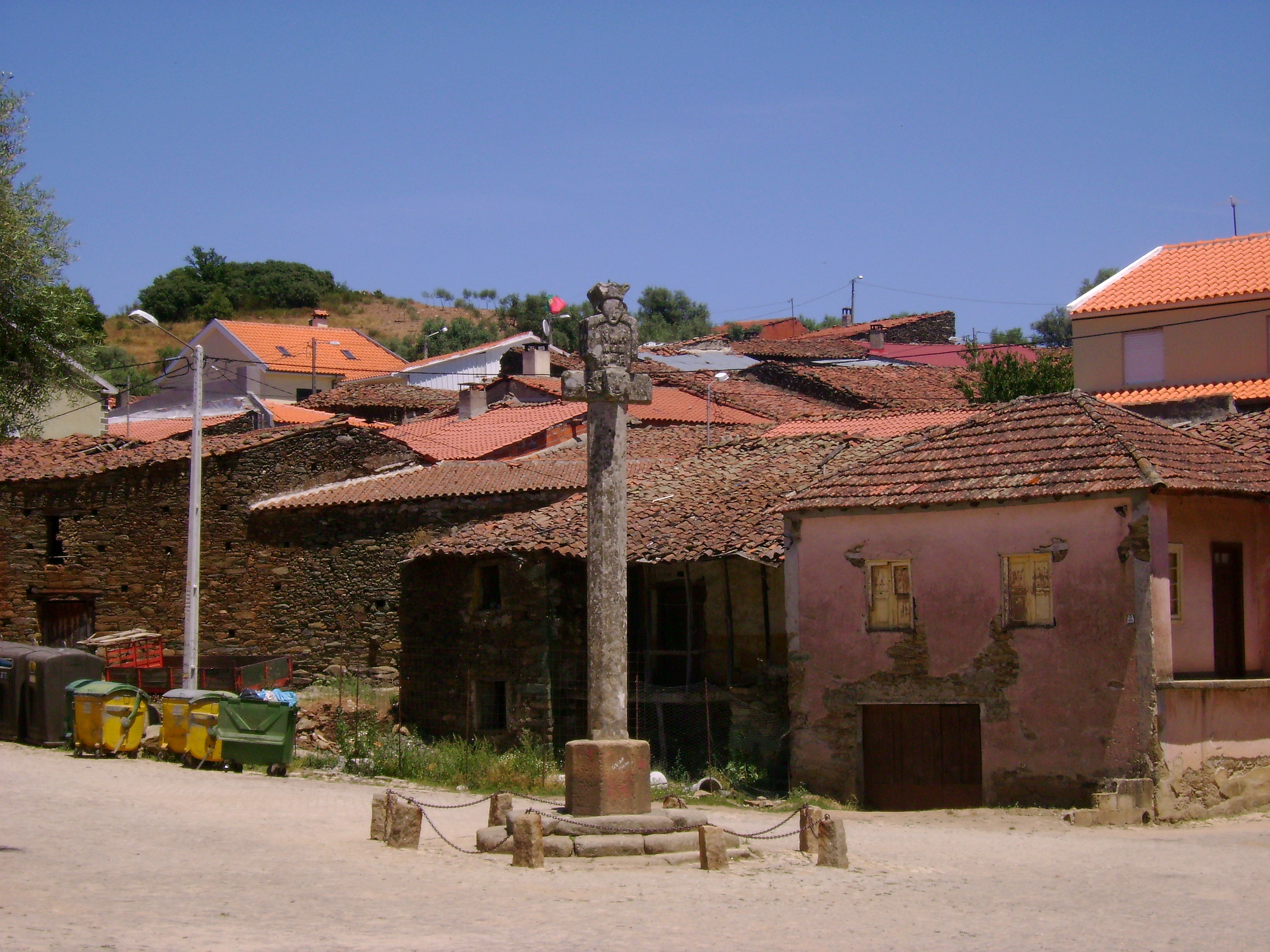
Vale de Pardos

Vale de Prados is a Portuguese parish located in the municipality of Macedo de Cavaleiros (Bragança District). The population in 2011 was 431, in an area of 10.37 km^{2}.
