= Túlia Saldanha =

Portuguse artist (1930–1988)

- Born: 26 August 1930; Macedo de Cavaleiros, Portugal
- Died: 30 April 1988 (aged 54); Macedo de Cavaleiros
- Movement: Fluxus; Neorealism; Minimalism; Pop art

Túlia Saldanha (1930 –1988) was a Portuguese visual artist whose work encompassed painting, sculpture, installation, and performance art. One of the first artists in Portugal to work in the fields of installation and performance art, she was also responsible for various educational and cultural outreach activities as a permanent member of the Coimbra Circle of Plastic Arts (CAPC) between 1968 and 1988.

== Early life ==
Born in the village of Peredo, in the Portuguese municipality of Macedo de Cavaleiros, on 26 August 1930, Saldanha spent her early years studying at a boarding school in Bragança, leaving at the age of fifteen to get married, at the insistence of her parents, as was still the custom in some small, more isolated towns in Portugal. While she was still a minor, her husband, twenty years her senior, became her guardian and enrolled her in the Doroteias Sisters' boarding school in Porto until she reached adulthood and completed her formal education. Afterwards, the couple moved to Vila Nova de Gaia and later returned to Macedo de Cavaleiros, where her husband worked as a lawyer and notary. When she was 26, with two daughters, she initiated legal separation proceedings on the grounds of her husband's infidelity. The scandal forced him to leave the town. Only ten years later, in 1966, did the court grant her separation and full autonomy over her possessions and assets, as well as maternal guardianship.

== Artistic career ==
Saldanha rented an apartment for herself and her two daughters in the university city of Coimbra in 1959. A few years later, together with her daughter Luísa, she enrolled in the Círculo de Artes Plásticas de Coimbra (Coimbra Circle of Plastic Arts – CAPC). She had received no prior training in art but began to learn various conceptual and experimental techniques and attend theoretical classes and workshops. She was mainly influenced by avant-garde movements, such as Fluxus, Neorealism, Minimalism and Pop art. She joined a group of multidisciplinary artists, including Albuquerque Mendes and Ângelo de Sousa, with whom she worked on various projects. Saldanha developed a large portfolio of work, including installations, performance art, sculptures, drawings and paintings, becoming known as a pioneer in performance art in Portugal.

She exhibited for the first time in 1971, at CAPC's Galeria Preta, with the installation Uma hora vi/Natureza morta queimada (I Saw an Hour/Burned Dead Nature), composed of a table and some culinary instruments, punctuated by various charred or matte black painted foods and objects, representing domestic life as a physical and symbolic space. Some of the objects she would later re-use in other installations. This was followed by participation in various exhibitions in Portugal and abroad with installations such as Black Room No. 1 (1973), Black Room No. 2 (1974) and Relaxation Room (1975–76). One of her best-known installations was From the Northeast to Coimbra from 1978, which consisted of a suitcase filled with objects, fruits, crockery and pieces of clothing, all painted black, representative of the period when she moved from Macedo de Cavaleiros to Coimbra. Other pieces were similarly autobiographical. Her performative art included The Banquet (1976–1979).

In 1974, she took over the direction of CAPC as a teacher of children and adolescents, and manager of artistic activities, maintaining her involvement with CAPC until the end of her life. In 1977, she participated in the Alternativa Zero exhibition, organized by the multidisciplinary artist and art critic, José Ernesto de Sousa, with whom she often collaborated. During the same period, she also met the German painter and sculptor Wolf Vostell, with whom she collaborated on several occasions, exhibiting together in exhibitions such as the Second Semana del Arte Contemporáneo de Malpartida in 1979. During the 1980s, Saldanha created several Fluxus-style works, such as 240.10.180 dissimetria mater (1980), one of her best-known installations, in which she represented herself inside a wooden box, with the exact measurements of her body, like a coffin, or the work Homage to Maciunas (1982), referring to the Lithuanian George Maciunas, a leading member of Fluxus.

Towards the end of her life, she returned to painting on paper and canvas. In this period, she often worked with the young German artist Robert Schad. Together they created 100 Hours to Draw (1981) and 33 Hours to Draw (1983). This again emphasised her emphasis on the collective and pedagogical role of art.

== Death and legacy ==
Saldanha died from cancer on 30 April 1988 after having returned to Macedo de Cavaleiros from Coimbra. She had flown home with her brother, a pilot, after circling the CAPC in his plane, which some have described as her last performance.

Her works are found in private and museum collections, notably at the Modern Art Centre (CAM) of the Calouste Gulbenkian Foundation in Lisbon and the Serralves Museum of Contemporary Art in Porto. Her name was given to a street in Macedo de Cavaleiros. A retrospective exhibition, featuring 63 pieces of her work, was organized by the Gulbenkian Foundation in 2014. A year later, the exhibition was transferred to the Vostell Museum in Malpartida, Spain. In 2020, a new retrospective exhibition was held at the Graça Morais Contemporary Art Centre in Bragança.
