= Saldanha (footballer, born 1989) =

Brazilian footballer

Personal information
- Full name: William de Oliveira Saldanha
- Date of birth: February 7, 1989 (age 37)
- Place of birth: Porto Alegre, Brazil
- Height: 1.77 m (5 ft 9 1/2 in)
- Position: Right back

Team information
- Current team: EC São José

Youth career
- –2007: Grêmio
- 2007: Cruzeiro (loan)
- 2008: Glória
- 2008–2009: Grêmio Prudente

Senior career*
Years	Team	Apps	(Gls)
2009–2011	Grêmio Prudente	25	(3)
2009	→ Portuguesa Santista (loan)	?	(?)
2009	→ Inter de Limeira (loan)	?	(?)
2009	→ Marília (loan)	8	(0)
2010	→ Atlético de Ibirama (loan)	?	(?)
2010	→ Cascavel (loan)	?	(?)
2012	Avaí		
2013	→ Santa Cruz (loan)		
2014–2015	Ypiranga	13	(13)
2016	Novo Hamburgo		
2016	Botafogo-PB	7	(1)
2017	Passo Fundo		
2017	Lajeadense		
2018	Cruzeiro-RS		
2019	Treze		
2019	Novo Hamburgo		
2020	EC São José		
- * Club domestic league appearances and goals as of 10:23, 20 January 2020 (UTC)

William de Oliveira Saldanha (born 7 February 1989), the Saldanha born in the Porto Alegre, is a defender who plays for EC São José. He can also play as midfielder.
