= Castelãos e Vilar do Monte =

- Civil parish
- Location in Portugal
- Coordinates: 41.518°N 6.936°W
- Country: Portugal
- Region: Norte
- Intermunic. comm.: Terras de Trás-os-Montes
- District: Bragança
- Municipality: Macedo de Cavaleiros

Area
  - Total: 18.84 km^{2} (7.27 sq mi)

Population (2011)
  - Total: 547
  - Density: 29/km^{2} (75/sq mi)
- Time zone: UTC+00:00 (WET)
  - Summer (DST): UTC+01:00 (WEST)

Castelãos e Vilar do Monte is a civil parish in the municipality of Macedo de Cavaleiros, northern Portugal. It was formed in 2013 by the merger of the former parishes Castelãos and Vilar do Monte. The population in 2011 was 547, in an area of 18.84 km^{2}.
