= Saldana (surname) =

Saldana is a Spanish surname. Notable people with the surname include:

- Joe Saldana (born 1944), American racing driver
- Joey Saldana (born 1972), American racing driver, son of Joe Saldana
- Nelson Saldana, American cyclist
- Theresa Saldana (1954–2016), American actress and author
- Todd Saldana (born 1962), American footballer

== See also ==
- Saldaña (surname)
