= Macedo de Cavaleiros =

- Municipality
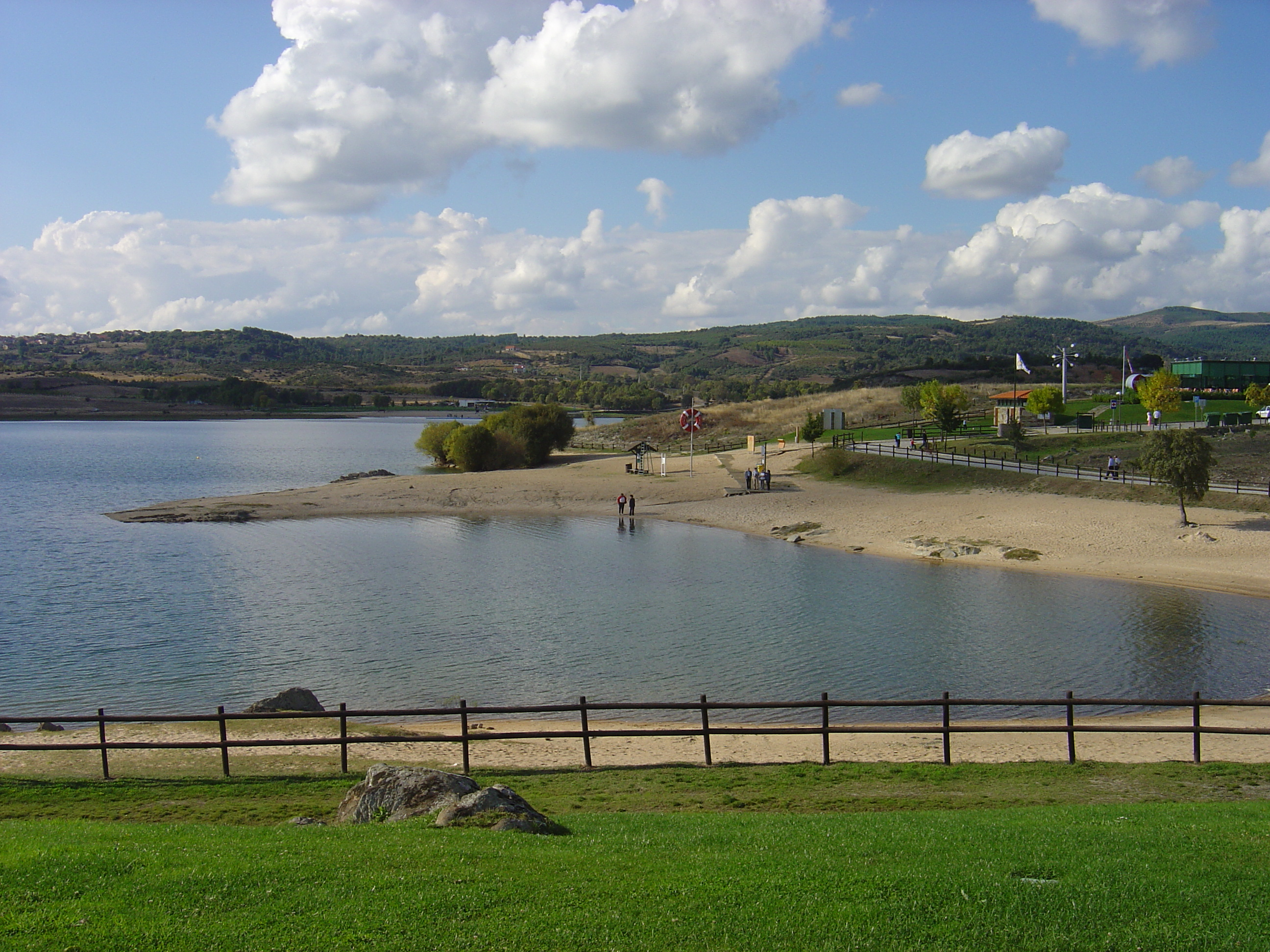
- The reservoir formed by the Azibo Dam, in the Paisagem Protegida da Albufeira do Azibo

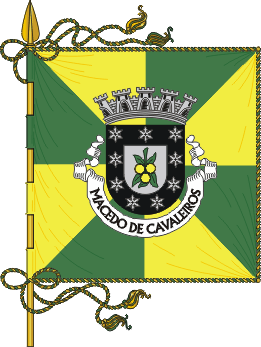
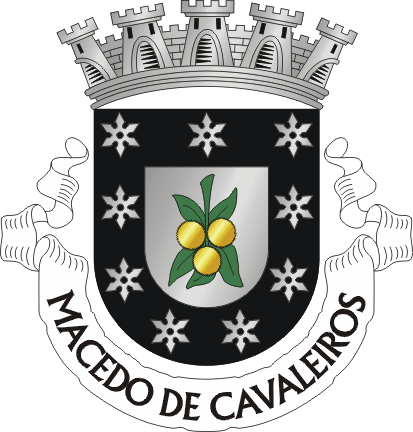
- Flag Coat of arms
- Interactive map of Macedo de Cavaleiros
- Location in Portugal
- Coordinates: 41°32′20″N 6°57′39″W
- Country: Portugal
- Region: Norte
- Intermunic. comm.: Terras de Trás-os-Montes
- District: Bragança
- Parishes: 30 (see text)

Government
  - President: Beraldino José Vilarinho Pinto (PPD-PSD)

Area
  - Total: 699.14 km^{2} (269.94 sq mi)
- Elevation: 614 m (2,014 ft)

Population (2011)
  - Total: 15,776
  - Density: 22.565/km^{2} (58.443/sq mi)
- Time zone: UTC+00:00 (WET)
  - Summer (DST): UTC+01:00 (WEST)
- Postal code: 5340
- Area code: 278
- Patron: São Pedro
- Website: www.cm-macedodecavaleiros.pt

Macedo de Cavaleiros (European Portuguese pronunciation: [mɐˈseðu ðɨ kɐvɐˈlɐjɾuʃ]) is a city and municipality in northeastern Portugal, in Bragança District. The population in 2011 was 15,776, in an area of 699.14 km^{2}.

== History ==
During antiquity, the region was occupied by the Celts, then Romans and finally the Arab forces of the Umayyad Caliphate, who dominated the region until the Christian Reconquista. The Romans defeated the local hill tribes, and reorganized settlements in the region, influencing local culture and social administration. The territory east of the Tua River, from Mirandela until the confluence of the Douro (which almost represents the district of Bragança) was Romanized, as was all of Iberia. In the 5th century, when the first barbarians invaded from the Pyrenees, this region, which was part of the Roman province of Gallaecia, which was administered and judicially subordinate to the religious courts and chancellery of Asturias. The Roman process of assimilation accelerated after resistance was defeated, and many of the ancient castros were destroyed or abandoned in favour of the organized settlements in the valleys. The barbarian invasions marked a multi-secular conflict in Iberia, and the land changed hands between rival groups regularly. The Suebi peoples, who came with the first invaders, founded their kingdom in the northwest part of the peninsula (from their capital in Braga), incorporating the lands of Bragança. Later the Visigoths and Arabs invaded, creating an uninhabited desert of the region, while concentrating their administration in the province of Zamora.

Origin of Name

The name Macedo de Cavaleiros came from a combination of concepts. The first from the Portuguese term for apple (Portuguese: maçã), since the region was acclaimed for its fertile lands and apple orchards (Portuguese: macedos). It was also associated with the knight (Portuguese: cavaleiro), Martim Gonçalves de Macedo, who saved John, the Master of Aviz during the Battle of Aljubarrota. During the battle on 14 August 1385, John was attacked by Álvaro Gonçalves de Sandoval, the Castilian striking down the nobleman. Macedo swiftly intervened, killing the assassin and saving the future King. King John recognized and was grateful to the knight, whose family coat-of-arms after the Battle began to appear with a blue sash and a silver apple.

During the Inquirições (English: Inquiries or inventory) of King Afonso, in 1258, the territory of Macedo belonged to the knights Nuno Martins and Mendes Gonçalves. At the time it was a small settlement, relatively unimportant if compared to neighbouring Nozelo, Vale Prados, Cortiços, Sezulfe and Pinhovelo, which received their forals before Macedo de Cavaleiros. It was only after the 14th century that references to Macedo dos Cavaleiros began to appear in official documents.

Around 1722, King John V designated Macedo as a Quinta, equivalent to a small estate, indicating the size of this region.

The municipality of Macedo de Cavaleiros was created in 1853, from the administrative remains of Chacim and Cortiços municipalities, and ten years later the settlement of Macedo was proclaimed a vila (English: town). To this time, the space were listed as royal lands, then established by John V for the House of Braganza.

Current affairs

Growth during the 20th century has been the result of immigration, resulting from the expansion of raillines and interlinking of circulatory avenues in the northeast of Portugal. A boom in construction and expansion of services was the result of the return of Colonial troops/citizens (Portuguese: Retornados) that occurred during the middle of the 20th century. As a consequence, the town of Macedo de Cavaleiros was elevated to the status of city in 1999.

Macedo de Cavaleiros was formerly served by the Tua line, a narrow gauge railway running between Bragança and Tua. The northern part of the line, including Macedo de Cavaleiros station, closed in 1991.

== Geography ==
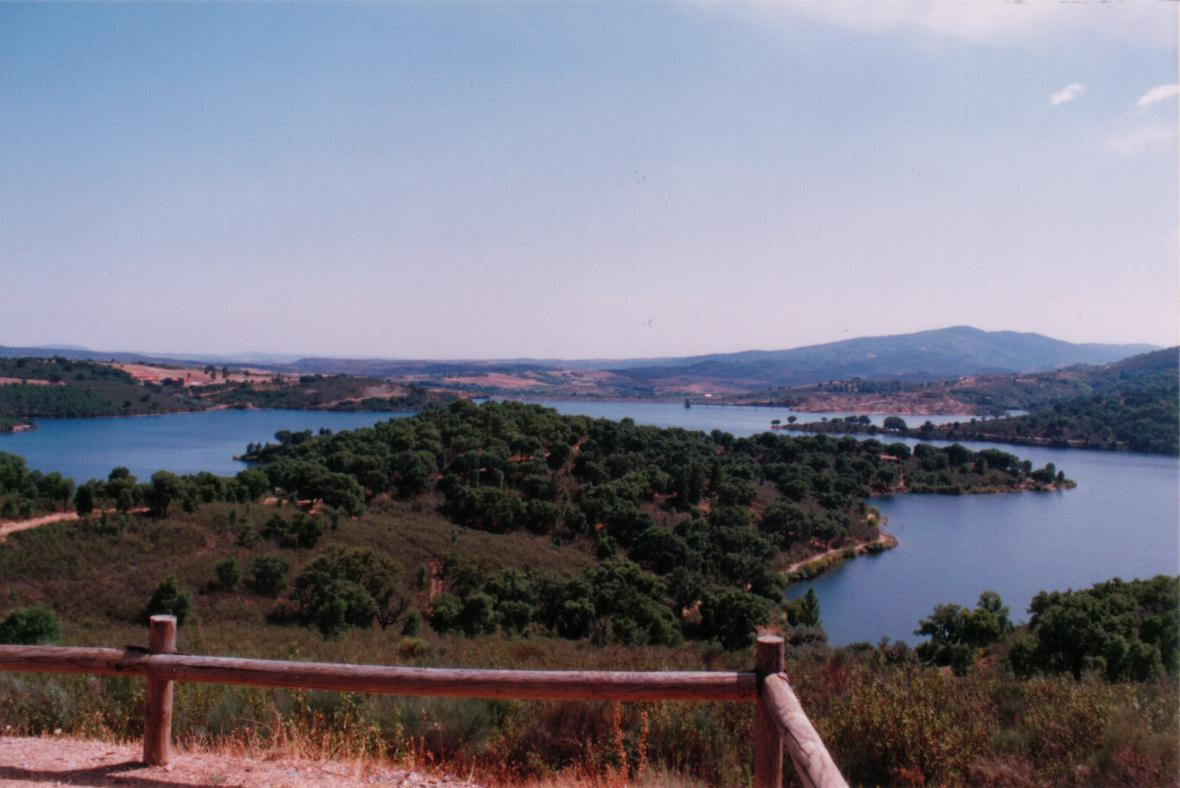
The view of the Azibo Protected Landscape, and aspects of the hilltops the circle the communities of Macedo de Cavaleiros

=== Physical geography ===
The municipality of Macedo de Cavaleiros is situated in the northeast region of the Trás-os-Montes, within the district of Bragança, limited by the neighbouring administrations of Bragança, Vinhais, Mirandela, Alfândega da Fé, Mogadouro and Vimioso. It occupies the central part of the district, in a transitional zone between the distinctly different Terra Fria (Cold Lands) and Terra Quente (Hot Lands). The median altitude in the municipality is between 600 and 700 metres, marked in the north by the Serra de Nogueira, in the centre by the Serra de Ala and Serra do Cubo, and in the south by the Serra de Bornes and the Monte de Morais.

==== Ecoregion/Protected areas ====
A vast part of the municipality (24.4%) is incorporated within the Natura 2000 initiative, with particular reference to the Morais Massif, considered the "umbigo do mundo" (Portuguese: navel of the world), due to the number of rare plant species. The Morais Massif occupies approximately 12,878 hectares (49.72 sq mi); it is serpentine geomorphological space with important geological and biological qualities. The Morais ophiolite is an uplifted section of rock from the boundary between the earth's crust and mantle. The Paisagem Protegida da Albufeira do Azibo (English: Protected Landscape of the Azibo Dam), is a unique environment: the result of the construction of the Azibo Dam between 1980 and 1982, that has resulted in an area of 4,987 hectares (19.25 sq mi): a mixture of both human and natural habitats, that includes species of aquatic and migratory birds. The lake created by the construction of the dam provided conditions for nautical sports, in addition to the creation of two beaches, and later, support facilities for golf, pedestrian trails and bike paths.

=== Climate ===
The municipality is divided into two climatic regions: Terra Fria (English: Cold Lands), to the north, an area of cold winters and hot dry summers; and the southern part of the municipality, referred to as Terra Quente (Portuguese: Hot Lands), between the Sabor River and the municipality of Mirandela, susceptible to lower winter temperatures and warm summers, commonly above 40 °C.

=== Human geography ===
The municipality consists of the following parishes:

- Ala e Vilarinho do Monte
- Amendoeira
- Arcas
- Bornes e Burga
- Carrapatas
- Castelãos e Vilar do Monte
- Chacim
- Cortiços
- Corujas
- Espadanedo, Edroso, Murçós e Soutelo Mourisco
- Ferreira
- Grijó
- Lagoa
- Lamalonga
- Lamas
- Lombo
- Macedo de Cavaleiros
- Morais
- Olmos
- Peredo
- Podence e Santa Combinha
- Salselas
- Sezulfe
- Talhas
- Talhinhas e Bagueixe
- Vale Benfeito
- Vale da Porca
- Vale de Prados
- Vilarinho de Agrochão
- Vinhas

==== Demographics ====
Population of Macedo de Cavaleiros (1864–2011)
Year	Pop.	±%
1864	17,208	—
1900	19,200	+11.6%
1930	19,781	+3.0%
1960	26,199	+32.4%
1981	21,608	−17.5%
1991	18,930	−12.4%
2001	17,449	−7.8%
2011	15,776	−9.6%

== Economy ==
The tertiary sector represents 58% of the economic activity in this territory; secondary activities, localized mostly in the industrial zone of the city, represent 22% of the activities of the region. Similarly, agricultural production (21% of the workforce are farmers), is involved in cultivation and animal husbandry. The climatic conditions in the region, and the fertility of its soils has allowed the cultivation and production of wine, cereals, olive and chestnut oils, in addition to the raising of cattle, sheep and goats in many of its fields.

== Religion ==
The Roman Catholic faith community is integrated into the Diocese of Bragança and Miranda. Originally, the episcopal seat was located in Miranda do Douro, at a time when the local population was less than 900 inhabitants.

== People ==
Notable people from the municipality include:

- Túlia Saldanha (1930–1988), installation and performance artist
