= Saldaña (surname) =

Saldaña is a Spanish surname. Notable people with the surname include:

- Brandon Saldaña (born 1991), American footballer
- Carlos Saldaña (born 1947), Mexican comic book author
- Diana Saldaña (born 1971), United States District Judge
- Excilia Saldaña (1946–1999), Afro-Cuban author
- Gisela Lara Saldaña (born 1956), Mexican politician
- Jaime Verdín Saldaña (born 1962), Mexican politician
- José M. Saldaña, Puerto Rican academic
- José Saldaña (born 1947), Peruvian politician
- Julio Saldaña (born 1967), Argentine footballer
- Lori Saldaña (born 1958), American politician
- María Elena Saldaña, Mexican actress
- María Lucero Saldaña (born 1957), Mexican politician
- Ponciano Saldaña (1928-2006), Filipino Olympic basketball player
- Sarah Saldaña, former director of U.S. Immigration and Customs Enforcement
- Terry Saldaña (1958–2023), Filipino basketball player
- Tomás Saldaña (born 1961), Spanish racing driver
- Zoe Saldaña (born 1978), American actress

== See also ==
- Saldana (surname)
