= Saldaña de Burgos =

Coordinates: 42°15′N 3°41′W

- Municipality and town
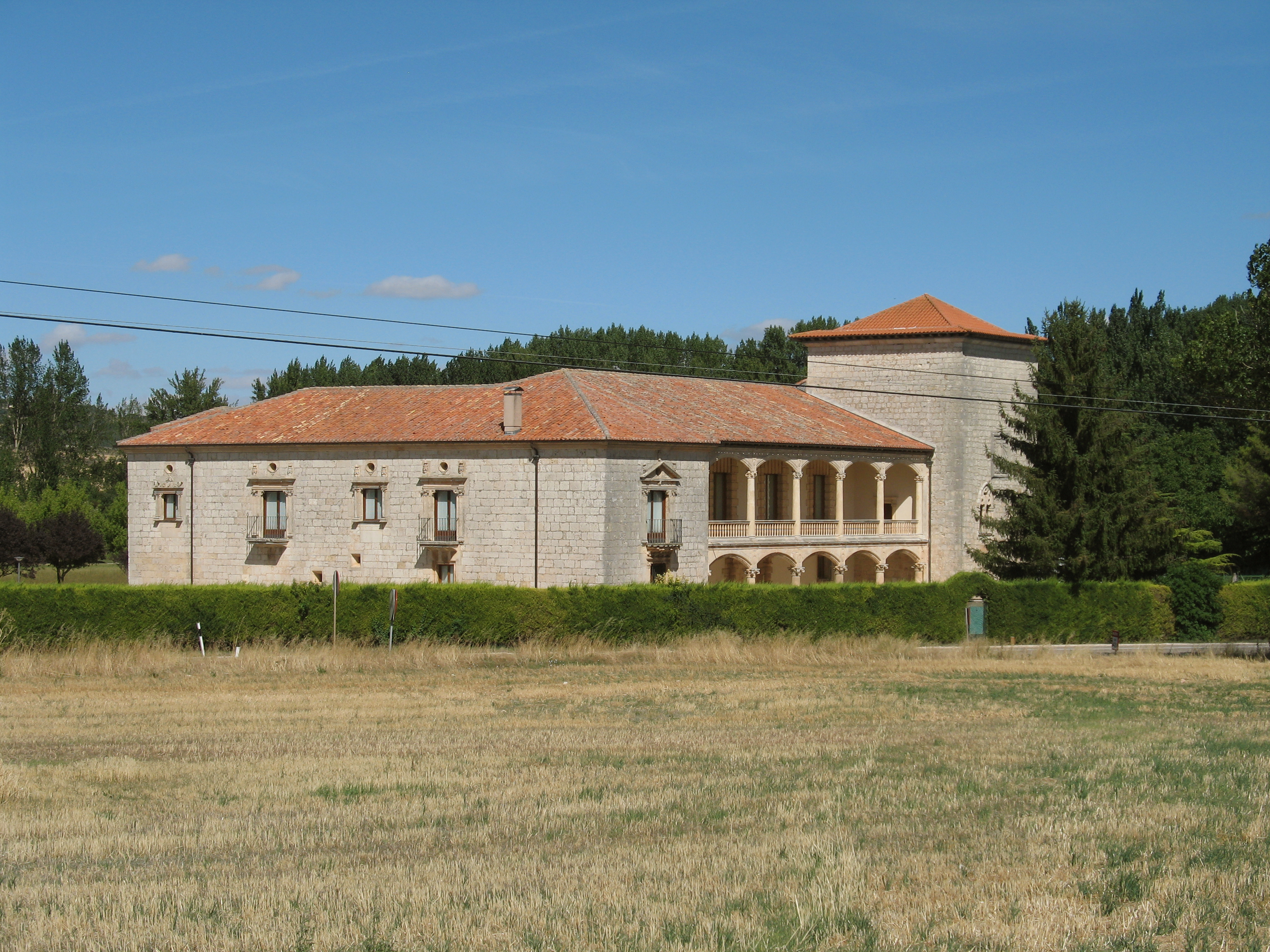
- Saldañuela Palace (15th-16th century)

- Flag Coat of arms
- Interactive map of Saldaña de Burgos
- Country: Spain
- Autonomous community: Castile and León
- Province: Burgos
- Comarca: Alfoz de Burgos

Area
  - Total: 8.15 km^{2} (3.15 sq mi)
- Elevation: 869 m (2,851 ft)

Population (2025-01-01)
  - Total: 203
  - Density: 24.9/km^{2} (64.5/sq mi)
- Time zone: UTC+1 (CET)
  - Summer (DST): UTC+2 (CEST)
- Postal code: 09620
- Website: http://www.saldañadeburgos.es/

Saldaña de Burgos is a municipality and town located in the province of Burgos, Castile and León, Spain. According to the 2004 census (INE), the municipality has a population of 132 inhabitants.
