= Serra do Alvão =

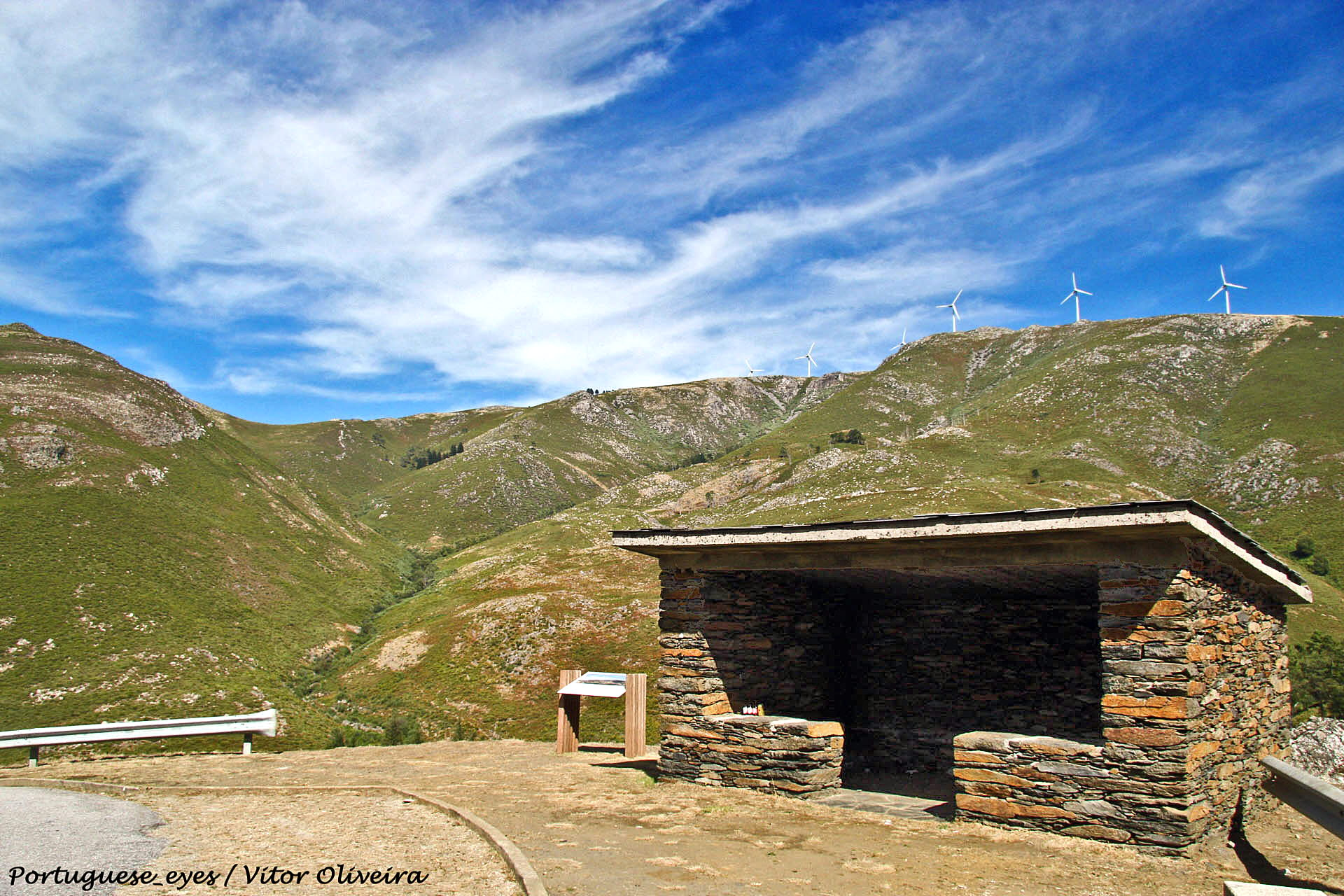

Highest point
- Elevation: 1,330 m (4,360 ft)
- Prominence: 416 m (1,365 ft)
- Coordinates: 41°21′42.4″N 7°45′54″W

Geography
- Location within Portugal
- Country: Portugal
- Region: Centro

Geology
- Rock type(s): Granite, Schist

Serra do Alvão is a mountain range in Trás-os-Montes e Alto Douro, near Vila Real. It rises up to 1330m. The Alvão Natural Park is located inside the area of the mountain.

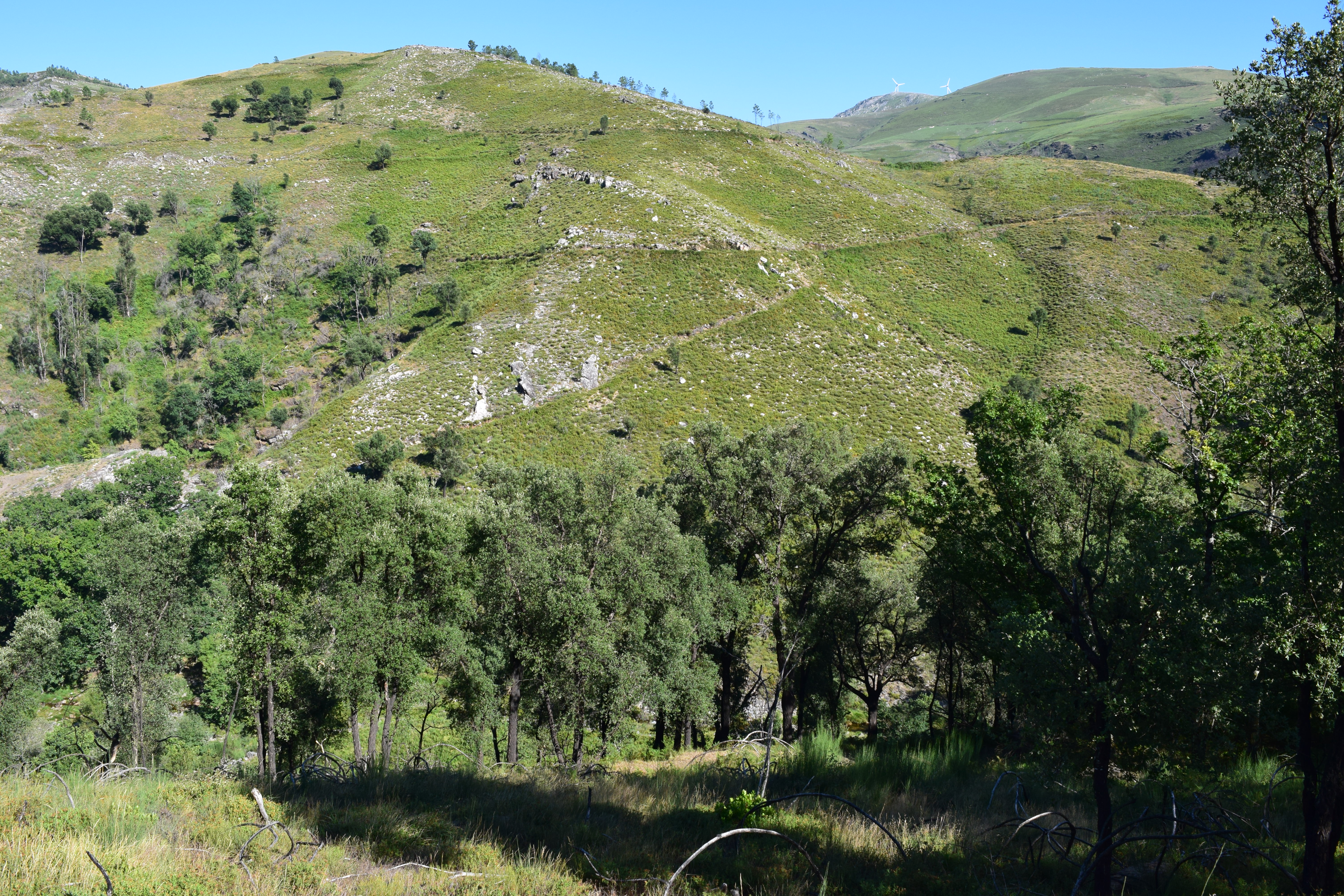
Alvão Natural Park
