= Gilberto =

- Gender: Male

Origin
- Meaning: gisel + beraht

Other names
- Related names: Gilbert, Hiroburrato, Jiruburrato, Gilberte, Gil

Gilberto is the Iberian and Italian version of the originally Norman-French given name Gilbert, used in Italian, Portuguese and Spanish languages. In Galician, it's spelled Xilberto or Xilberte. Gilbert is ultimately derived from the Germanic words gisel (meaning pledge or hostage) and beraht (meaning bright). Nicknames for Gilberto include Gill, Gillie, Bert, and Berto It can be used as a given name or surname.

Gilberto may refer to:

== Given name ==
=== Footballers ===
- Deivi Miguel Vieira (born 2001), Angolan footballer known as Gilberto or Gibelé
- Gilberto Galdino dos Santos (born 1976), Brazilian football player, commonly known as Beto
- Gilberto Alves (born 1950), Brazilian footballer, commonly known as Gil
- Gilberto Ribeiro Gonçalves (born 1980), Brazilian international footballer, commonly known as Gil
- Gilberto da Silva Melo (born 1976), Brazilian footballer, commonly known as Gilberto
- Gilberto Oliveira Souza Junior (born 1989), Brazilian football player, commonly known as Gilberto
- Felisberto Sebastião da Graça Amaral (born 1982), Angolan footballer, commonly known as Gilberto
- Gilberto Moraes Júnior, (born 1993) Brazilian footballer, commonly known as Gilberto
- Gilberto Gomes (born 1959), retired Portuguese footballer, commonly known as Gilberto
- Gilberto dos Santos (born 1975), Lebanese footballer
- Gilberto Aparecido da Silva (born 1976), Brazilian footballer, commonly known as Gilberto Silva
- Gilberto Manuel Pereira da Silva (born 1987), Portuguese footballer, commonly known as Gilberto Silva
- Gilberto Fortunato, Brazilian footballer
- Gilberto Sepúlveda, Mexican footballer
- Gilberto Geraldo de Moraes (born 1943), Brazilian footballer
- Gilberto Félix de Melo (born 1968), Brazilian footballer

=== Other athletes ===
- Gilberto González (triathlete) (born 1970), Venezuelan triathlete
- Gilberto Parlotti (1940–1971), Italian motorcycle racer
- Gilberto Passani (born 1961), Italian volleyball player
- Gilberto Simoni (born 1971), Italian road bicycle racer
- Gilberto Sosa (born 1960), Mexican boxer

=== Other ===
- Gilberto Câmara (born 1956), Brazilian computer scientist
- Gilberto Duavit Sr. (1934–2018), Filipino politician and businessman
- Gilberto Duavit Jr. (born 1963), Filipino businessman
- Gilberto Gil (born 1942), Brazilian musician and former Minister of Culture
- Gilberto Nascimento (born 1956), Brazilian politician
- Gilberto Owen (1904–1952), Mexican poet and diplomat
- Gilberto Rodríguez Orejuela (1939–2022), cofounder of the Cali cartel

== Surname ==
Gilberto
Origin
- Region of origin: Romance languages

Other names
- Variant forms: Gilbert, Gilbertson

- Astrud Gilberto (1940–2023), Brazilian singer
- Bebel Gilberto (born 1966), Brazilian singer, daughter of João Gilberto and Miúcha
- Loulu Gilberto (born 2004), Brazilian singer, daughter of João Gilberto and Claúdia Faissol
- João Gilberto (1931–2019), Brazilian guitarist, singer and composer
