= Gilbert (given name) =

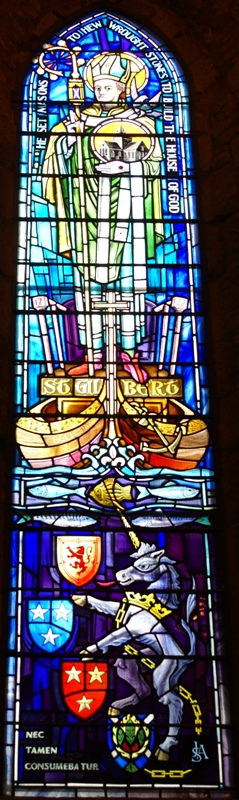
- Stained glass of Gilbert de Moravia
- Pronunciation: /ˈɡɪlbɜːrt/ French: [ʒil.bɛʁ]
- Gender: Male

Origin
- Origin: Norman-French
- Meaning: gisel + beraht

Other names
- Related names: Gilberto, Gilberte, Gil

Gilbert is a given name of Norman-French origin, itself from Germanic Gisilberht or Gisalberht. Original spellings included Gislebert, Guilbert and Gilebert. The first element, Gil-, comes from Germanic gīsil, meaning "shaft of an arrow" or gisal "pledge, hostage", while the second element, -bert comes from Germanic -behrt, short form of beraht, meaning "bright" or "famous". The name spread in France and was introduced to England by the Normans, where it was popular during the Middle Ages.

Variant spellings have evolved throughout Europe, including the Iberian/Italian version Gilberto and, as was the custom across Europe, given a Latin language version Gilbertus, to be used alongside a person's native variant. The diminutives Gil, Gillie and Bert eventually became popular as a standalone given name or nickname. Gilberte is the feminized version of the name. Gilbert, with variant spellings, is also used as a surname (see Gilbert (surname)).

== Translations ==
- Arabic: غيلبرت
- Belarusian: Гілберт (Hilbiert)
- Bengali: গিলবার্ট (Gilabārṭa)
- Chinese Simplified: 吉尔伯特 (Jí'ěr bó tè)
- Chinese Traditional: 吉爾伯特 (Jí'ěr bó tè)
- English: Gilbert
- French: Gilbert
- German: Gilbert
- Gujarati: ગિલ્બર્ટ (Gilbarṭa)
- Hebrew: גילברט
- Hindi: गिल्बर्ट (Gilbarṭ)
- Indonesian: Gilbert
- Italian: Gilberto
- Japanese: ギルバート (Girubāto)
- Kannada: ಗಿಲ್ಬರ್ಟ್ (Gilbarṭ)
- Korean: 길버트 (Gilbeoteu)
- Lithuanian: Gilbertas
- Macedonian: Гилберт
- Marathi: गिल्बर्ट (Gilbarṭa)
- Mongolian: Гилберт (Gilbyert)
- Nepali: गिल्बर्ट (Gilbarṭa)
- Persian: گیلبرت
- Portuguese: Gilberto
- Russian: Гилберт
- Serbo-Croatian: Gìlbert / Гѝлберт
- Sinhala: ගිල්බට් (Gilbaṭ), ගිල්බාතු (Gilbātu)
- Spanish: Gilberto
- Tamil: கில்பர்ட் (Kilparṭ)
- Telugu: గిల్బర్ట్ (Gilbarṭ)
- Thai: กิลเบิร์ต (Kilbeir̒)
- Turkish: Jilbert, Jilber
- Ukrainian: Гілберт (Hilbert)
- Urdu: گلبرٹ
- Yiddish: גילבערט (Gilbert)

== People with the name ==
- Saint Gilbert (disambiguation), multiple people
- Gilbert (Archdeacon of Lismore), early 13th-century Irish Catholic priest
- Gilbert, Count of Brionne (c. 1000–c. 1040), French noble
- Gilbert, Count of Gravina (fl. 1159–1167), Norman French noble in Italy
- Gilbert, Count of Montpensier (1443–1496), French noble
- Gilbert of Glenluce (died 1253), Scottish, 13th-century Cistercian monk, abbot and bishop
- Gilbert of Sempringham (c. 1083–1190), the only Englishman to found a monastic order
- Gilbertus Anglicus or Gilbert of England (c. 1180 – c. 1250), English physician
- Gilbert Arenas (born 1982), American professional basketball player
- Gilbert Bécaud (1927–2001), French singer, composer, pianist and actor
- Gilbert Brown (born 1971), American football player
- Gilbert Brulé (born 1987), Canadian ice hockey player
- Gilbert Buatère, Norman adventurer, one of the principal commanders of Battle of Cannae (1018)
- Gilbert Bundy (1911–1955), American cartoonist and illustrator
- Sir Gilbert Thomas Carter, administrative officer in the Royal Navy and a colonial official for the British Empire, administrator for Gambia, governor for the Lagos Colony, governor for The Bahamas and Barbados and governor for Trinidad and Tobago
- Gilbert Cates (1934–2011), American film director and television producer
- Gilbert Cavan (died 1420), Scottish cleric
- G. K. Chesterton (Gilbert Keith Chesterton, 1874–1936), English writer
- Gilbert Crispin (c. 1055–1117), Anglo-Norman monk appointed abbot, proctor, and servant of Westminster Abbey
- Gilbert Cruz (born 1980), Puerto Rican professional wrestler
- Gilbert de Beauregard Robinson (1906–1992), Canadian mathematician
- Gilbert de Chambrun (1909–2009), French politician
- Gilbert de Clare, 1st Earl of Pembroke (c. 1100–1148), Anglo-Norman earl
- Gilbert de la Porrée or Gilbertus Porretanus (1070–1154), French scholastic logician and theologian
- Gilbert Doucet (1956–2020), French rugby union player
- Gilbert Dragon (1969–2021), Haitian police chief and guerrilla leader
- Marquis de Lafayette (1757–1834), French general and politician who fought in the American Revolution and was involved in the French Revolution
- Gilbert Eisner, American fencer
- Gilbert John Elliot-Murray-Kynynmound, 4th Earl of Minto, British peer and politician who served as Governor General of Canada, the eighth since Canadian Confederation, and as Viceroy and 17th Governor-General of India
- Gilbert Franklin (1919–2004), American sculptor, educator.
- Gilbert Gottfried (1955–2022), American actor and stand-up comedian
- Gilbert Greenall (born 1954), UN humanitarian advisor
- Gilbert Gress (born 1941), French football coach and former football player
- Gil Hodges (1924–1972), American baseball player
- Gilbert von In der Maur (1887–1959), Austrian SS leader and journalist
- Gilbert Khunwane (born 1977), Batswana boxer
- Gilbert Levin (1924–2021), American engineer
- Gilbert Lumoindong (born 1966), Indonesian protestant pastor
- Gilbert Mamery (1927–2003), Puerto Rican disc-jockey, musicologist, radio station owner, radio and television personality, marketing impresario, and composer
- Gilbert Marouani (1933–2016), Tunisian-born music producer and agent
- Gilbert R. Mason (1928–2006), American physician and civil rights activist
- Gilbert Melendez (born 1982), American mixed martial artist
- Gilbert Hugh Murdoch, Canadian politician
- Gilbert Daniel Nessim (born 1966), chemistry professor at Bar-Ilan University
- Gilbert O'Sullivan (born 1946), stage name of Irish musician Raymond Edward O'Sullivan
- Gilbert Ouy (1924–2011), French historian, palaeographer and librarian
- Gilbert E. Patterson (1939–2007), American Pentecostal clergyman
- Gilbert Pena (born 1949), Texas politician
- Gilbert Phelps (1915–1993), British educationist and author
- Gilbert Reaney (1924–2008), English musicologist
- Gilbert Rozon (born 1954), Canadian impresario
- Gilbert Stuart (1755–1828), American painter
- Gilbert Tosetti (1879–1923), English cricketer
- Gilbert Tuhabonye (born 1974), American long-distance runner
- Gilbert Van Binst (1951–2025), Belgian footballer
- Gilbert F. White (1911–2006), American geographer
- Gilbert Yarde (1673–1707), English Member of Parliament

== Fictional characters ==
- Gilbert Blythe, a character in the novel series Anne of Green Gables by Lucy Maud Montgomery
- Gil Grissom, a forensic entomologist in the television series CSI: Crime Scene Investigation
- Gibert Huph, a character in the 2004 Disney/Pixar animated film The Incredibles

== Popularity ==
In England and Wales, Gilbert ranked 64th in popularity in 1904, 72nd in 1914 and 95th in 1924. By 1934 it had dropped out of the Top 100.

== See also ==
- Gilberto
- Gille Brigte (disambiguation)
- Gislebertus, 12th-century sculptor
