= Paulo Teixeira =

Paulo Teixeira may refer to:

- Paulo Teixeira (doctor), Brazilian doctor
- Paulo Teixeira (footballer) (born 1980), Portuguese footballer
- Paulo Teixeira (politician), Brazilian politician
- Paulo Teixeira Jorge (1934–2010), Angolan politician
