= Castle of Mirandela =

Medieval castle in Mirandela, Bragança, Portugal

- Castelo de Mirandela
- Bragança, Alto Trás-os-Montes, Norte Region, Portugal in Portugal
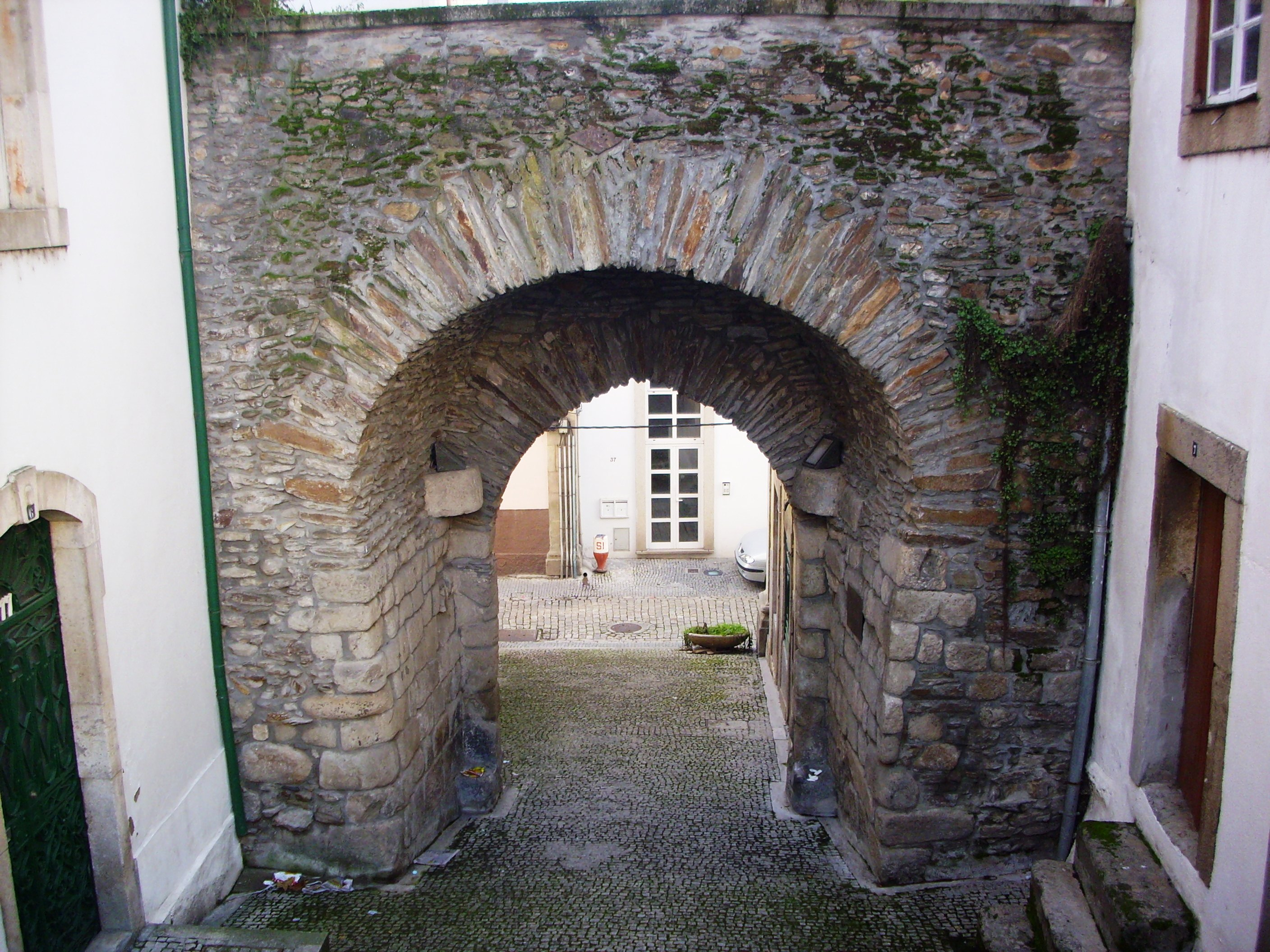
- The Roman-arched Santo António Gate, one of the few remaining references to the castle

Site information
- Type: Castle
- Owner: Portuguese Republic
- Open to the public: Public

Location
- Coordinates: 41°29′5.22″N 7°11′4.29″W

Site history
- Built: 1198
- Materials: Granite, Shale, Clay, Cement

The Castle of Mirandela (Portuguese: Castelo de Montalvão) is a medieval castle in the civil parish of Mirandela, municipality of the same name, in the Portuguese district of Bragança.

== History ==
During the Roman occupation of the Iberian peninsula, the territory of Mirandela was intensely populated; owing to its fertile, arable land it was an important agricultural centre.

In the Trás-os-Montes region, Mirandela has always occupied a central place within the territory. In 1198, one of the first references to the settlement occurred with the stay of King D. Sancho I when Bragança was under siege by troops loyal to King Alfonso IX of León.

King D. Afonso III conceded a foral to Mirandela in 1250. It is likely that the construction of the castle and wall fortifications were begun at this time, in order to protect the population. The 1258 Inquiries suggest that the settlement had existed since the reign of King Afonso II. In 1282, the primitive settlement of Mirandela was transferred from the locale of Castelo Velho to the elevated hilltop of Cabeçao de São Miguel by regal charter. During the sequence of this event, the monarch also issued orders to erect a citadel and keep tower. At the time of its completion it was considered, for the epoch, one of the better fortifications in the Trás-os-Montes region.

On 7 March 1291, King D. Dinis conceded a new foral and defined the limites of the municipal territory of Mirandela. Construction of the tower and walls along the hilltop of São Miguel continued. Within the walls, the first fair occurred in 1295.

On 27 June 1301, a letter of donation was issued for the town of Mirandela to Branca Lourenço.

A notice was issued in 1318, regarding the position of the citadel at Mirandela by the King to Domingos Geraldes, in virtue of the state of abandon, which was designated as the Paaço del Rey (the Palace of the King).

The castle was mentioned between 1383 and 1385, in the Chronicle of D. João I by Fernão Lopes, who indicated Mirandela's support of the pretensions of the Master of Avis. During this time and extending to 1448, Mirandela was one of the medieval castles that suffered several interventions to conserve and reinforce the structure.

Notice in 1401 indicated that public works were being undertaken on the walls and dungeons through the initiative of the Crown, owing to the war.

King D. Manuel I conceded a new foral to Mirandela, in Lisbon on 1 July 1512. But, quickly, by 1530, the castle lost its military importance, which started its gradual decline and ruin of the castle. As a public census indicated that year: "The town of Mirandela is encircled by parts in ruin".

A 1688 municipal document mentioned the Postigo de São José that existed in one of the walls of the castle.

Father Carvalho da Costa, writing in 1706: the town "is walled for old use with feeble wall with parts in ruin and three doors". Another contemporary at the time, J. Alvarez Colmenar referred to Mirandela as being situated on the margins of the Tuela River and defended by a castle in 1715.

With loss of its strategic/defensive role and growth in economic development, many builders looked to the unused walls as potential building material. From the 19th century on, the castle became a source of stone, helping to pave new streets and building houses. The walls of the castle were lowered by half a meter, in order to support the repaving of the city streets. Between 1874 and 1884, various parts of the walls were knocked down in order to construct buildings in the town.

At the beginning of the 20th century, two of the four gates still remained at the castle: one of the gates was destroyed intentionally by the municipality. This occurred even as in May 1950, the municipal authority placed a plaque on the interior arch, commemorating the 700 years since Mirandela's elevation to the status of town. The remains of the medieval wall, represented by the Santo António Gate, was classified as a Property of Public Interest by decree published on 20 October 1955. By the 1970s notices describe the castle of Mirandela as in ruin. Yet, in May 2000, another plaque was erected to mark the 750 anniversary of the towns elevation.

== Architecture ==
The urban castle is surrounded by residence, especially in the lower quarter, situated along an arterial near the Tua River and bridge, and the Rua da Republica. Most of the buildings that surround the remains of the old castle are three floors high.

Of the remaining links to the castle's history, is the Santo António Gate, formed from two thick walls, separated by a rounded arch, broken on the exterior and rounded on the interior side. The gate is approximately 4.5–5 metres (15–16 ft) high, with the still visible the grooves in the granite stones for the hinges used in opening and closing the access. Over the gate are vestiges of the primitive Chemin de ronde walkway, which was later transformed into a terrace for the residences. There are other wall segments throughout the city, some 5 metres (16 ft) high and 2 metres (6.6 ft) thick, built with a base of granite and shale throughout.
