= Frechas =

- Civil parish
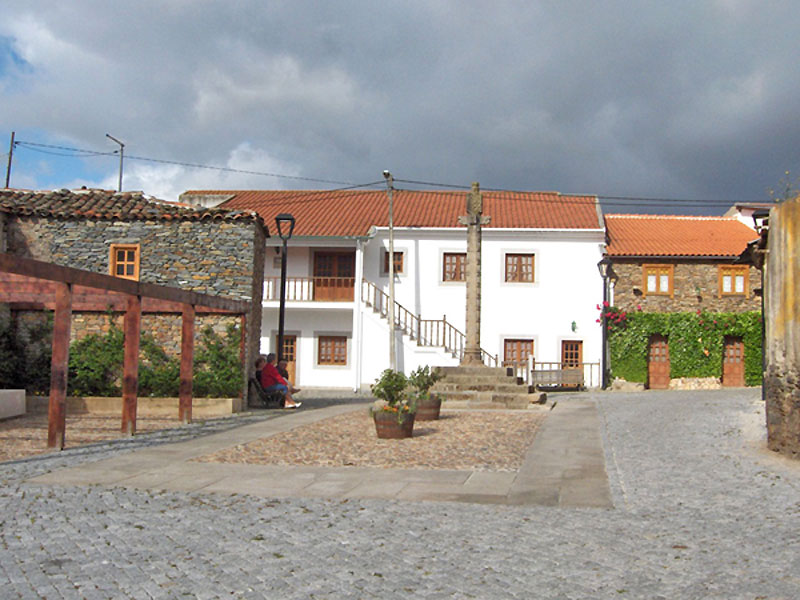
- The pelourinho in the main square of Frechas

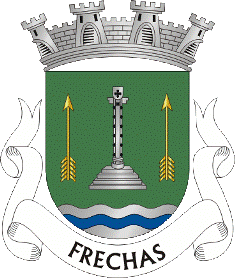
- Coat of arms

- Coordinates: 41.412°N 7.164°W
- Country: Portugal
- Region: Norte
- Intermunic. comm.: Terras de Trás-os-Montes
- District: Bragança
- Municipality: Mirandela

Area
  - Total: 18.54 km^{2} (7.16 sq mi)
- Elevation: 382 m (1,253 ft)

Population (2011)
  - Total: 929
  - Density: 50.1/km^{2} (130/sq mi)
- Time zone: UTC+00:00 (WET)
  - Summer (DST): UTC+01:00 (WEST)
- Postal code: 5370

Frechas is a Portuguese civil parish, located in the municipality of Mirandela, in the district of Bragança. The population in 2011 was 929, in an area of 18.54 km^{2}.

== History ==
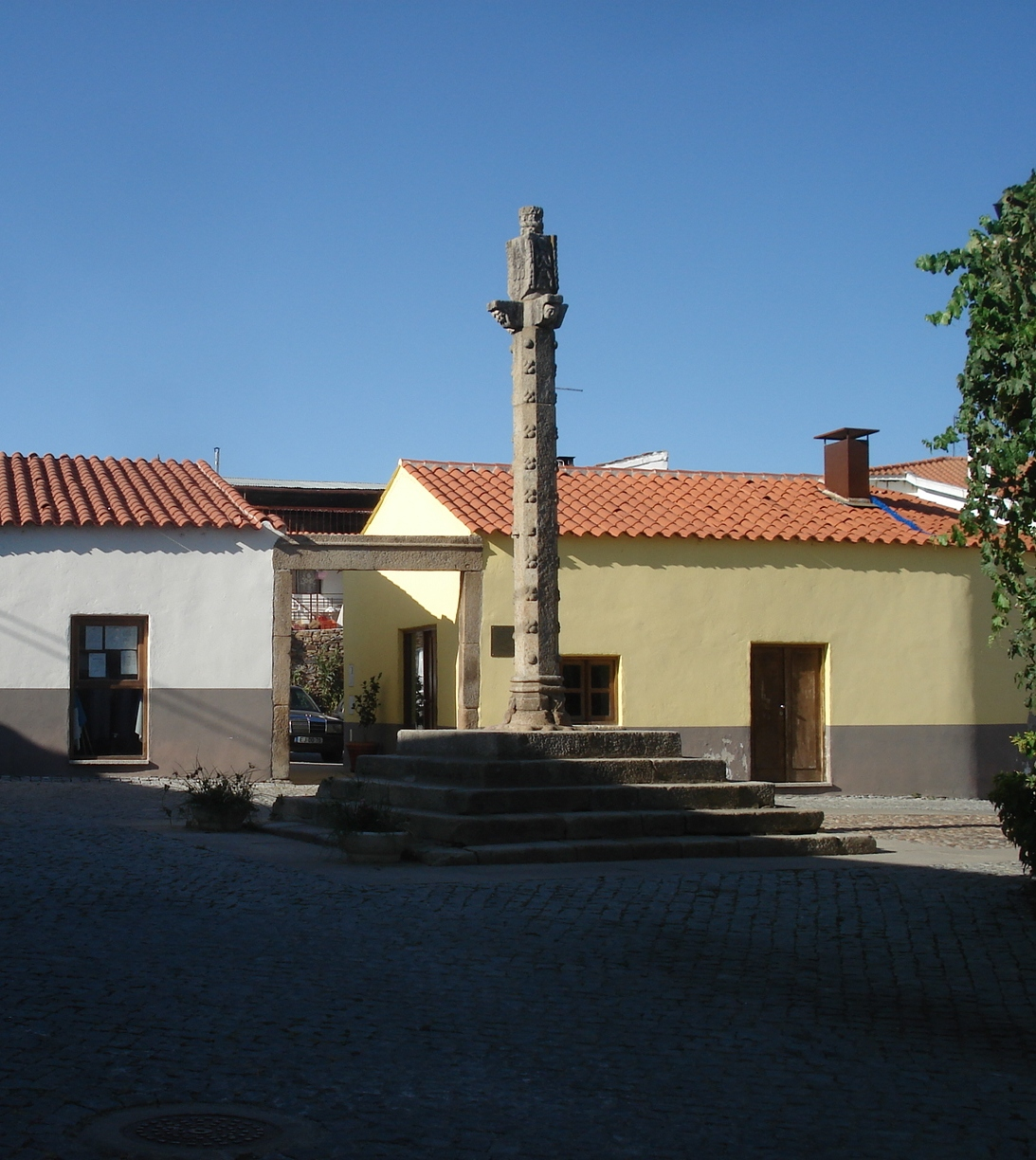
The Pillory of Frechas, the symbol of the parishes one-time status of municipality

Its early settlement is still clouded in a lack of documented references; although archaeological remains are various, the earliest established settlement was the fortified colony of Fraga do Castelo in Vale da Sancha.

Before 1258, Lourenço Soares received a foral for the settlement of Frechas; it remained in the hands of him and the sons of Nuno Martim of Chacim by 1285. Frechas, at one time, was the municipal seat of its own municipality (which was extinguished in 1836). King Manuel I first issued a foral on 10 March 1513 to the unincorporated territory. It included provisions for a civil governor, two municipal judges and councilmen (as well as associated staff, which were subordinate to the ombudsmen of Vila Flor). Their de juro and heretical donatorio, was the Master of the Casa de Vila Flor (House of Vila Flor), who was represented in Frechas by a notary, while a judge from Torre de Moncorvo administered the King's justice. Ecclesiastically, the old parochia or vicarage, was under the jurisdiction of the rector of São Lourenço de Libela, under the patron saint of São Miguel.

By 1527, the municipality of Frechas included 82 residents, whose lands were under the seigneurial rights of Fernão Vaz de Sampaio. From the tomb of the Commander of Rio Torto, the village church was annexed to the Military Order of São Lourenço de Lillela (Rio Torto), two-thirds of the tithes belong to the military order, while the remaining third was held by Manuel de Sampaio. The parish priest received a stipend of 12$600 réis annually, in addition to 2$000 réis to support repairs on his residence, in addition to 20 alqueires of wheat; to the church factory, the Commander of Rio Torto paid 3$000 réis annually, for 3.5 almudes of olive oil, two alqueires for wheat for sacramental bread dand two almudes of wine for the cruet.

In 1706, during the administration of donatorio Manuel de Sampaio e Melo of the House of Vila Flor (Portuguese: Casa de Vila Flor), the town included 100 homes, and the church was represented by the Rector of Rio Frio (in Chaves), who was a Commander in the Order of Christ, from the House of the Counts of São Lourenço. By 1758, the municipality pertained to the Comarca of Torre de Moncorvo, under the dontario Francisco José de Sampaio (the parish with 150 homes and 277 residents).

After the 1755 Lisbon earthquake, the Vicar-General of Torre de Moncorvo established an inquiry in 1755 to examine the state of parishes under his domain. Even though there was little damage from this event, the investigations illuminated the condition of the parish and church: it was under the Rector of São Lourenço de Libela, Manuel António Silveira, and military command of the Count of São Vicente (who received 300$000 réis annually); the priest received an annual salary of 16$000 réis, 5$000 for his residence, and 34 alqueires of wheat, 30 alqueires of rye and 27 almudes of wine; the remaining clergy received 10.000 réis and 30 alqueires of rye; the parish factory was supported by $8.000 réis and oil to illuminate the sacristy; at the time there parish included 150 residents, who paid the church an alqueire each of rye.

By 1796, Freches included: 224 men and 203 women (of which were identified two were barbers, three clergy, one writer, three without occupation, two businessmen, one surgeon, 26 farmers, 24 day workers, 3 seamstresses, five shoemakers, five carpenters, one blacksmith, four millers, one barqueiro arrais, 12 shepherds and 19 servants). In the last decade of the 18th century, the parochial church was in ruins, necessitating the construction of a new temple, which was initiated by José Ferreira da Costa, with the remodelling of the main chapel. The population of Frechas included 85 homes and 261 residents at this time.

On 28 January 1875, the community opened their first primary teaching school, although by 1852 some level of teaching had already existed in the parish.

By 1950, there were 823 inhabitants in the parish. A decade later, the parish was home to eight olive oil manufacturers, two olive oil warehouses, a Casa do Povo, four local shops/markets, two mines (responsible for arsenic, gold and silver mining) and one schoolteacher. By 1981 there were approximately 1794, resulting from an influx of peoples associated with agro-industrial complex in Cachão, and numbers of returnees from the Colonial Wars (1974–75). Yet, these numbers decreased a bit: by 1991 there were 1471 residents, and then approximately 1139, by 2001.

== Geography ==
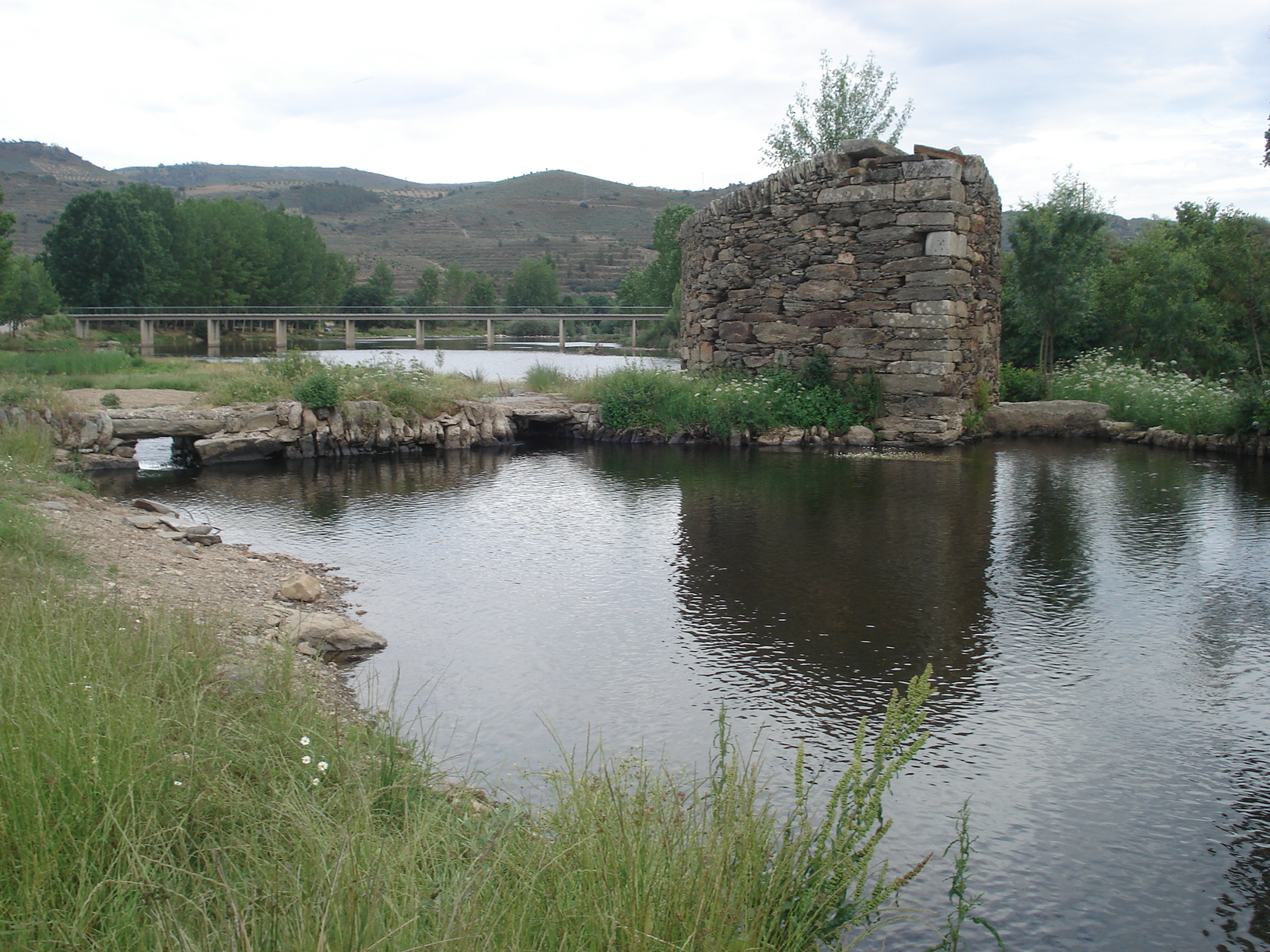
Watermill located along the river beach area of Frechas

Located along the left bank of the River Tua, Frechas is 10 kilometres south-southeast of the district capital of Mirandela. The parish, apart from its seat in Frechas, includes two other settlements: Cachão (sometimes referred to as Vila Nordeste) and Vale da Sancha.

== Economy ==
Many of these inhabitants dedicated themselves to agriculture primarily, although activities in Cachão and Frechas were laterally important. Land along the Tua River are the most fertile. There is a mixture of agricultural techniques: a mixture of mechanized production and older hand-tilling of the land Carriages, hoes and tractors are common, as are older barns and greenhouses. The community produces olive oil, wine, many vegetables, fruits and cereal crops (largely subsistence agriculture). While dairy and beef-cattle are common, most residents tend to graze sheep or goats.

== Architecture ==
Many of the two-storey homes in the parish are constructed regional schist with exterior staircases. There are some typical examples of this style in the tourist post or the Terreiro de Santa Ana (a nobleman's home with lateral chapel from 1768). Other Transmontanan houses include the richly ornate Casa dos Araújos near the Chapel of São Sebastião dating from 1961, or others along the Rua de S. Sebastião (from 1957), are examples of the style. At the Rua da Estação, the main road to the village, near the primary school and kindergarten is the main intersection, home to the local Junta de Freguesia (parish council) and the towns historical pelourinho (pillory): the area is the intersection of many of the villages roadways. From Rua de S. Miguel the axis of the community extends to the main church and the Bairro de Nossa Senhora de Lurdes, while in counterpoint, the Rua do Rio and Rua de Santa Ana follow the secondary accessways of the settlement. The pillory is the judicial and autonomic symbol of Frechas history, when it was a municipal seat (and municipality).

=== Civic ===
- Fountain of the Engaranhados (Portuguese: Fonte dos Engaranhados) - constructed in 1588, this spring was mentioned in 1706 as one of two sources of water in Vale da Sancha (the second was located in the Rua da Fontinha, but was later destroyed). Located below the Chapel of Nossa Senhora do Viso, it was considered a prized source of '"miraculous waters", where the image of saints were placed and children were taken for miracles. The Romanesque-arched granite façade (inscribed with "1588") surmounts a rectangular "tank" spring/fountain, that includes a bevelled cornice in the interior.
- Pillory of Frechas (Portuguese: Pelourinho de Frechas) - the five-step, octagonal-shaped pillory, stands 4.6 metres from its base, in the Largo do Pelourinho. Its form is crowned with a Greek cross, with four arms: two with carved faces, one with a flower, and all sculpted in granite. Above this an ellipsoid oriented to the north by two faces (one with a bearded and the other a crown), that includes a female figure, the national shield motif with four castles and a shield of the Sampaio family.
- Primary School of Frechas (Portuguese: Escola Primária de Frechas)

=== Religious ===
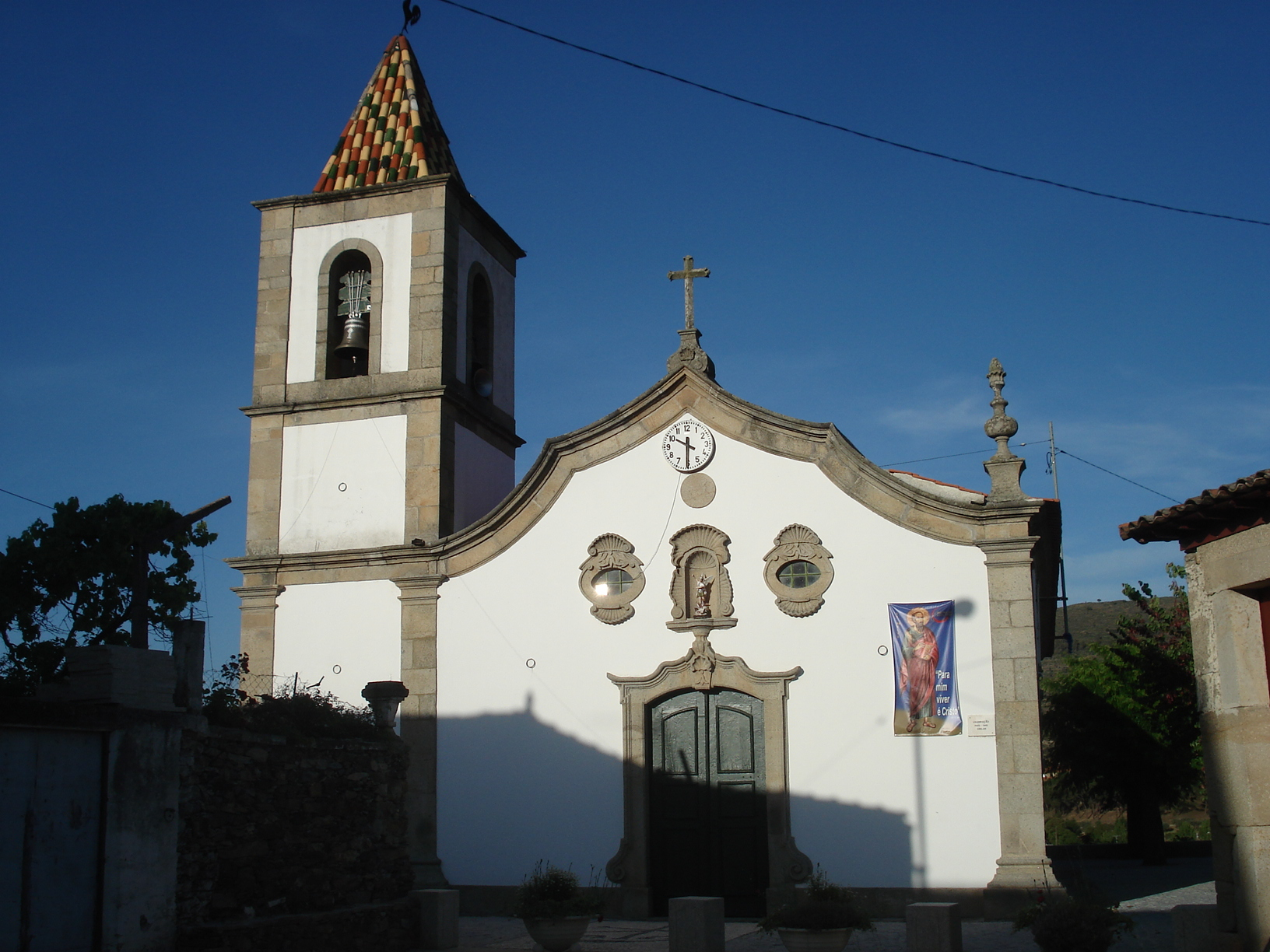
The parochial Church of São Miguel

- Chapel of Nossa Senhora das Lourdes (Portuguese: Capela da Nossa Senhora das Lourdes)
- Chapel of Nossa Senhora do Aviso (Portuguese: Capela da Nossa Senhora do Aviso) - the chapel of Our Lady of Warning, an isolated rural chapel, located in the Serra do Marmeleiro, overlooking the valley of the Tua River, and settlements of Vale da Sancha and Frechas; it is a single nave church built on a level platform, surrounded by a wall, with a form that includes a simple façade with bell-tower niche, Roman arch doorways and white interior with one-step altar. The small chapels to a pre-Roman period (archaeological excavations of the area discovered three fonts from the epoch); the construction of the current structure dates probably to the 16th century; a 1758 account refers to "Nossa Senhora do Viso indicate that pilgrims travelled [through this chapel] to Foscôa, in Celores, that in the past, many pilgrims in neighbouring localities stopped here, [but] today pilgrims have not stopped here." During the 20th century, around 1960, the chapel was reconstructed, owing to it being found in a state of ruins.
- Chapel of São Sebastião (Portuguese: Capela de São Sebastião)
- Church of Cachão (Portuguese: Igreja de Cachão)
- Church of São Miguel Arcanjo (Portuguese: Igreja de São Miguel Arcango) - the church of the archangel Michael, a single-nave parochial church of Frechas, which includes aspects of Baroque and Roccoco architectural styles, is located in the valley of the Tua River, alongside the left bank of the river in Frechas. In 1758, the church had five altars: the main altar, one dedicated to Nossa Senhora do Rosário, one to Senhor Crucificado, another to Santa Luzia and an altar to Nossa Senhora das Almas; at the time the church had two naves, a brother (Portuguese: Irmandade das Almas) and two confraternities (Portuguese: Confraria do Senhor and Confraria da Nossa Senhora do Rosário). The parish priest was adjunct-vicar in the name of the Rector of São Lourenço de Lillela in Rio Torto (Chaves) and included an adjunct clergy. The church sustained little damage from the 1755 Lisbon earthquake; a piece of wood fell from the main chapel. By the end of the 18th century, this church was in ruins, necessitating a remodelling project that resulting in a petition to the Crown for 300$000 réis.
- Church of São Gonçalo (Portuguese: Igreja de São Gonçalo)
- Cross of Vale de Sancha (Portuguese: Cruzeiro de Vale da Sancha) - located in the parish of Vale da Sancha, along a sideroad across from the Flagosa ravine, in the shadow of the Outeiro do Alto do Marmeleiro in Vale da Sancha; it is in the extreme northern part of the parish, near the intersection between the municipal road to Macedinho and the roadway to the Chapel of Nossa Senhora do Aviso. The pillory-cross of granite stands on rectangular platform of three steps, surrounded by a niche/altar with inscribed carving of IHS, and octagonal cross in cement. Likely constructed in the 17th century, during the 1980s the cross was replaced with a cement replica.
