= Giberson (surname) =

Giberson is a surname. Notable people with the surname include:

- Karl W. Giberson (born 1957), American physicist, scholar, and author
- Lydia Giberson (1899–1994), Canadian-American psychiatrist

== See also ==
- Gilbertson
