= Ouy =

Ouy is a surname. Notable people with the surname include:

- Achille Ouy (1889–1959), French philosopher and sociologist
- Gilbert Ouy (1924–2011), French historian, paleographer, and librarian
