= Torre de Dona Chama =

- Civil parish
- Location in Portugal
- Coordinates: 41.654°N 7.128°W
- Country: Portugal
- Region: Norte
- Intermunic. comm.: Terras de Trás-os-Montes
- District: Bragança
- Municipality: Mirandela

Area
  - Total: 27.68 km^{2} (10.69 sq mi)
- Elevation: 306 m (1,004 ft)

Population (2011)
  - Total: 1,105
  - Density: 39.92/km^{2} (103.4/sq mi)
- Time zone: UTC+00:00 (WET)
  - Summer (DST): UTC+01:00 (WEST)
- Postal code: 5385
- Area code: 278
- Patron: Nossa Senhora da Encarnação

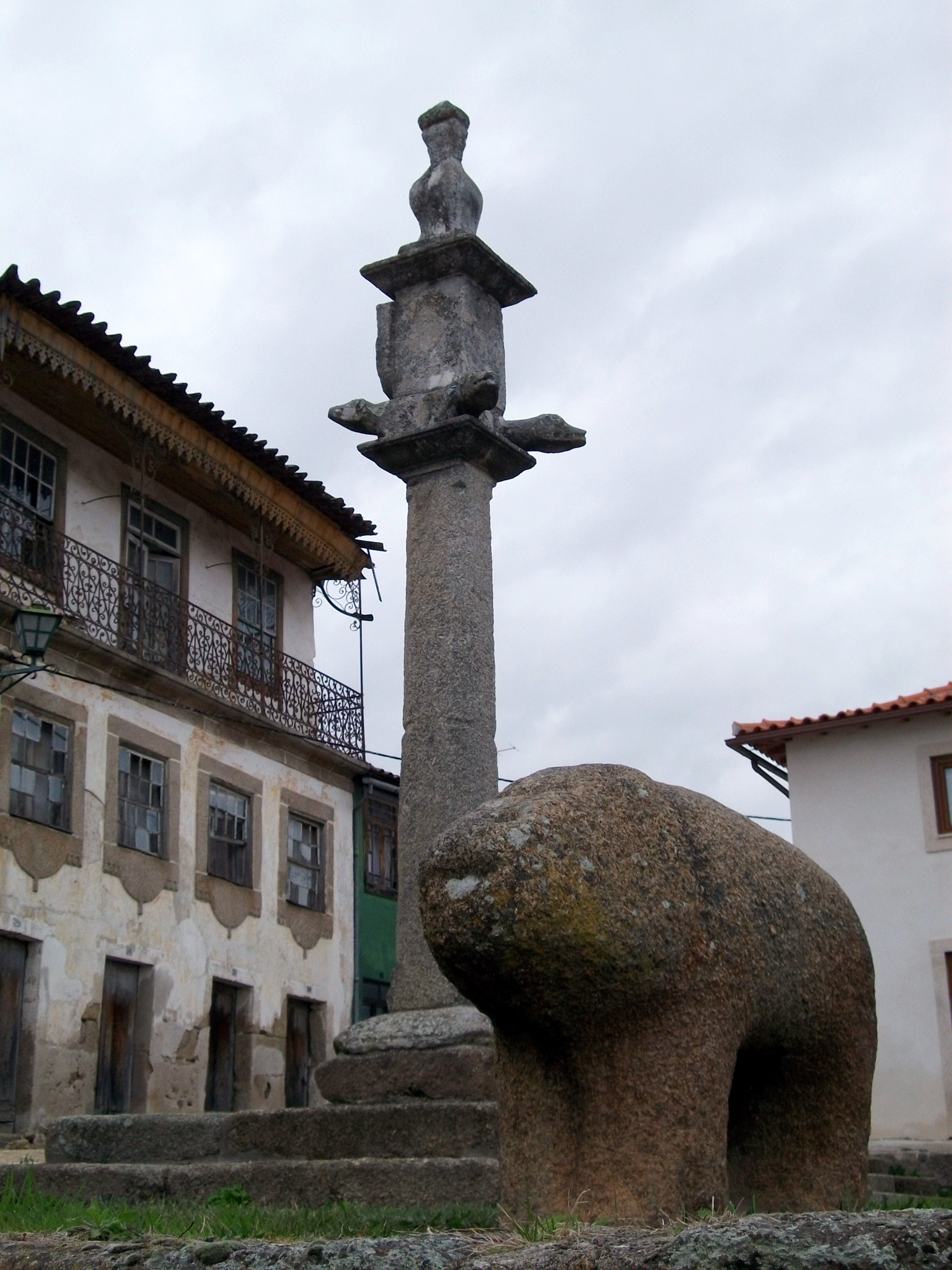
Pillory and water trough of Torre de Dona Chama, Mirandela, Portugal.

Torre de Dona Chama is a Portuguese civil parish in the Mirandela Municipality and district of Bragança, in the Trás-os-Montes region of northern Portugal. The population in 2011 was 1,105, in an area of 27.68 km².

== History ==
Settled prior to the establishment of a Kingdom of Portugal, its name is derived from two precepts: the existence of a tower (Portuguese: Torre), whose owner was a local lady (where Dona Chama is the Lady Chama). Historical etymology suggests that the latter surname Chama was actually derived from Flâmula, altered to Châmoa before taking on this name. Medieval chancelleries refer to the region as Turris de Domina Fla^{n}mula, and by the 13th century, the foral issued by King Denis indicated the area as Torre de Dona Climâmoa. Some historians indicate there is a certain coincidence between the noblewoman, Dona Châmoa Rodrigues, who lived there in 960, and consequently consider her the founder of the locality.

There are clear archeological remnants that date the settlement of this region. On the São Brás Hill, a small hermitage was constructed to the patron saint Saint Blaise, whose chapel was constructed from the walls of Luso-Roman fort. It is likely that this chapel was constructed after the demolish/destruction of another pre-existing temple (likely Santa Maria), since Saint Blaise was not a common saint during the High Middle Ages. Meanwhile the castro fort suffered many different invasions and defenses from Romans, Moors and Christians over the years. The local ecclesiastical parish of 1758 were the remains of the devotional community around São Brás, and likely populated Torre de D. Chama. Various copper and bronze utensils and some ceramics were encountered during excavations in the site. During the Middle Ages, Torre de D. Chama began to gain an important strategic role, resulting in the issuing of a foral (charter) by King Denis on 25 April 1287 (later renovated on 25 March 1299). Much later, King Manuel conceded another foral on 14 May 1512. During the reign of King Ferdinand the signeurial rights were passed on the Spanish nobleman, which were later reversed during the Regency of John, the Master of Aviz, who passed this title to Gonçalo Vasques Guedes, a Portuguese nobleman and donatorio of Murça. This title remained in the family for several generations.

The ecclesiastical parish was administered by clergy approved by the Guide Abbey.

The municipality of Torre de D. Chama was extinguished in 1855, its parishes being dispersed to the neighboring municipalities of Vinhais, Macedo de Cavaleiros and Mirandela (specifically Espadanedo, Ervedosa, Ferreira, Fradizela, Lamalonga, Guide and S. Pedro Velho).

In 1530, the population included 317 residents distributed within its small settlements: Lama Longa and Argana with 10 each; Vilar d'Ouro and Ribeirinha with six; Ferradosa, Mosteirô and Seixo with seven; Vai D'Amieiro had three; Couços, Regadeiro, and Vai de Navalho with nine; Vilares had 12; S. Pedro Velho 21; Fornos 18; Melles 25; Guide 37; Vale de Gouvinhas 17; Fradizela 26; Vale de Prados 14; Múrias 24; Gandariças with four; Vale Maior 11; and Vila Nova with six.

In 1796, the resident population was approximately 1391 men and 1289 women, that included four barbers, 17 clergy, three literary writers, 41 unemployed, six businessmen, four surgeons/doctors, two merchants, 290 farmers and 140 day-laborers, 24 seamstresses, 20 cobblers, seven carpenters, 14 stone-smiths, four iron-smiths, five blacksmiths, one hat-maker, 7 transporters/carriage drivers and 103 domestic servants.

In 1960, transport was a primary function in Torre (linking Bragança and Mirandela) and supporting the merchant industries, such as commerce, olive oil production, cereal crops, fruit and wine. Located in Torre were: a fertilizer deposit, two banking agencies, a funeral home, a magazine concern, four insurance agents, 11 seamstresses, one sports association and Casa do Povo, one repair garage, one olive oil deposit, an olive oil merchant, four barbers, two cafés, a pharmacy, a metal shop, a philharmonic band, gas station, a metal fabricator, an agricultural implement dealer, three medics, seven markets/shops, four millers, three hotels, four teachers, the civil registry, three sawmills, three butchers, two rocksmiths and three transport companies.

Owing to energetic growth rate and resident population Torre de Dona Chama was elevated to the status of vila (town) in 1991.

== Geography ==
Torre de D. Chama is situated on the left bank of the River Tuela, a little more than three kilometres north-northeast of the district capital. It is fronted by a green mound of the Serra da Nogueira, south by the fertile lands of the municipality of Macedo de Cavaleiros, and crossed by various raviness. It is 25 kilometres from Mirandela, Macedo de Cavaleiros or Valpaços and 50 kilometres from Bragança.

Apart from the main settlement, the parish is highlighted by two other communities:

- Guide - identified by its grandioso square, location of the main church, and with several restored dwellings that indicate its history;
- Vilares - located along the road to Mirandela, a stretch of four kilometres with a scattering of a dozen buildings, that include the main Chapel and the Casa Rural (Rural House)

== Economy ==
The parish has many resources, and its inhabitants do not only dedicate themselves to agricultural activities. Although it is the dominant income industry, commerce, education and other services are influential. Agricultural activities associated with seed, grafting, fertilizer, liming, animal feed and their derivatives have been economic successes. These have helped to produce and expand the production of olive oil, wine, various fruits and cereal crops. Mechanization of agricultural activities has begun to spread, in a region that has traditionally used hoes, forks, picks and rakes. There are various examples of animal husbandry, including dairy and meat cattle, goats, sheep and pig farmers in the parish.

The region is also home to flourmilling factories, bakers, olive oil producers, cementmakers, gravel mines, ceramics artisans, marble and granite sculptures, and masons, in addition to wine cellars, aluminum stampers, steelsmiths, sawmills and carpentry businesses.
