= Vale de Gouvinhas =

- Civil parish
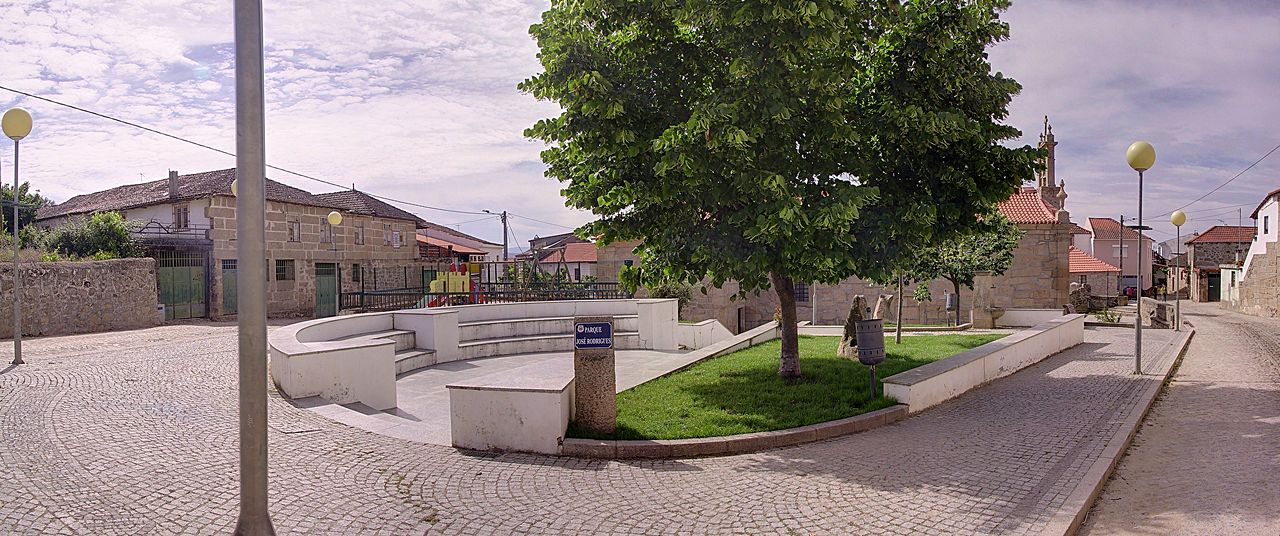
- Parque José Rodrigues

- Location in Portugal
- Coordinates: 41.629°N 7.202°W
- Country: Portugal
- Region: Norte
- Intermunic. comm.: Terras de Trás-os-Montes
- District: Bragança
- Municipality: Mirandela

Area
  - Total: 17.14 km^{2} (6.62 sq mi)

Population (2011)
  - Total: 319
  - Density: 18.6/km^{2} (48.2/sq mi)
- Time zone: UTC+00:00 (WET)
  - Summer (DST): UTC+01:00 (WEST)
- Patron: Saint Andrew
- Website: http://www.valedegouvinhas.com/

The village Vale de Gouvinhas is situated in a valley on the right bank of the river Tuela in the municipality of Mirandela, Portugal. The population in 2011 was 319, in an area of 17.14 km^{2}. It borders the villages Abambres (5 km), Vale de Telhas (2 km), Bouça and Cabanelas (3 km). The centre of Mirandela lies at 20 km.

== Naming ==
The toponym Vale de Gouvinhas seems an anthroponym, that is, it seems to come from the name of a person. Historians believe that this person is of Germanic origin (Ganda), but they can not specifically identify the name. In the second century appeared the name "Gaudin" (Latin). In 1150 the name called "Goubina (Goubinas?) appears in the Curia of Dom Afonso Henriques. Both names can be related to the toponym Gouvinhas, for the third hypothesis, by phonetic evolution in the merging patronymic "Gaudilaci" of Gaudila and Gouvia. What is clear that the name Gouvinhas is old.

== History ==
This location, taking account of the archeology of Torre de Dona Chama, the fort and the fortifications, point to a settlement in the pre- and proto-history. The current village dates from the twelfth century. From a religious point of view, Vale de Gouvinhas and the neighboring villages form a union since the fifteenth century. It is erected by the abbey of Saint Mammes in Guide through the establishment of a church and a parish, appointed by the Curia. From a royal perspective, a notable from Torre de Dona Chama was ruler. Administratively, these villages formed the "Terra de Ledra" and there was, for a period of domination by Torre de Dona Chama, a division of the land in the form of "reviews" (twelfth or thirteenth century). It remained a part of the province Torre de Dona Chama to October 24, 1855, the date the province ceased to exist. Currently it is part of the municipality Mirandela.

== Heraldry ==
Coat of Arms: Red shield, a jolted golden grapevine, foliated and golden tendrils, silvery fruit, under a cross of the Sovereign Military Hospitaller Order of Saint John of Jerusalem of Rhodes and of Malta on top of silver and blue waived stripes. Silver mural crown with three towers. White listel with caption in black: "Vale de Gouvinhas".

Flag: white. Silver and red cord and tassels. Golden rod and spear.

Seal: according to the law with caption: "Union of villages of Vale de Gouvinhas - Mirandela".

== Festivals and Fairs ==
What	When	Where
Festival of Our Lady of the Rosary	Held on the 2nd weekend in August	Vale de Gouvinhas
Festival of Saint Andrew	Commemorated on November 30	Vale de Gouvinhas
Festival of Saint Margaret	Takes place on the 3rd weekend of July	Vale de Maior
Festival of the Holy Spirit	Held on the 7th weekend after Easter	Quintas

== External links and sources ==
- Portuguese Wikipedia article
- Vale de Gouvinhas web site
