= Gille Brigte =

Gille Brigte (sometimes rendered as Gilbert) may refer to:

- Gille Brigte, Earl of Angus (fl. 1150)
- Gille Brigte of Galloway (died 1185)
- Gille Brigte, Earl of Strathearn (died 1223)
- Gillebríghde Albanach (fl. 1200–1230), poet and crusader
- Gilbert, Earl of Orkney (1210–1256)

== See also ==
- Gilbert (given name)
