= Guide, Mirandela =

Guide
- Village
- Location within Portugal
- Coordinates: 41°38′55″N 7°07′46″W
- Time zone: UTC+0 (GMT)
- Postal code: 5385-071
- Area code: PT
- Website: https://www.facebook.com/AldeiaGuide
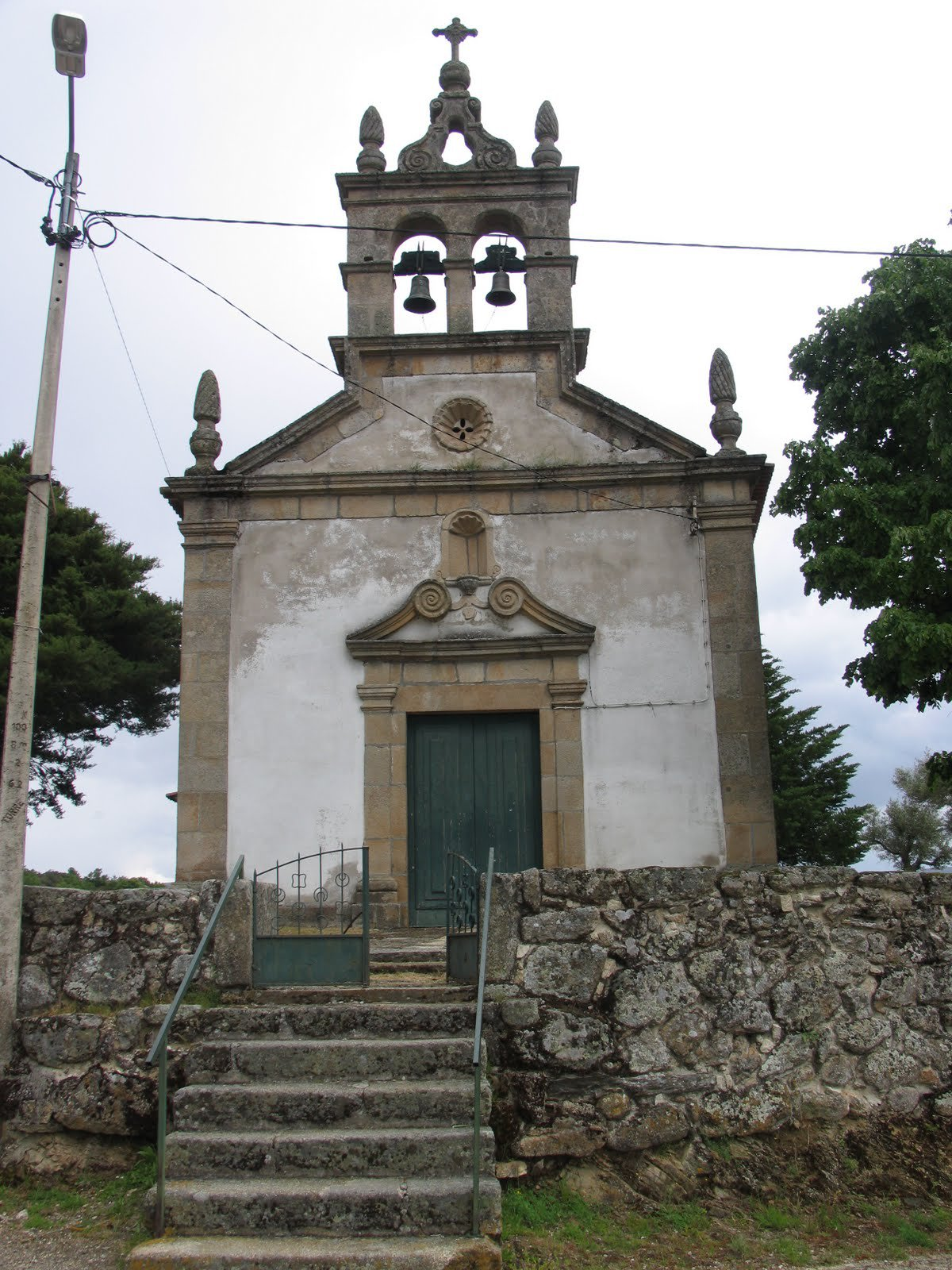
- Igreja de Guide

Guide is a Portuguese village at Torre de Dona Chama, in the Mirandela municipality, in the district of Bragança. It is located 3 kilometres (1.9 mi) southwest of the center of Torre de Dona Chama and 10 kilometres (6.2 mi) north of Mirandela. The village is located to the east of the Tuela river, a tributary of the Tua River. The national road 206 passes east of the village, connecting it to Bragança and Mirandela.

At the entrance to the village, there is the Church of Guide (Igreja de Guide), a Property of Public Interest (IIP). The church is of baroque style and it was built in the 18th century. It has not received significant changes to its original design and some restoration work has been carried out. The most recent intervention was carried out in 2015, under a project to improve the cultural patrimony in the Tua River valley, in the context of a new hydroelectric dam.
