= Gilbertson =

The surname Gilbertson has several origins. Sometimes it is derived from the personal name Gilbert. In other cases it is an Americanization of the Norwegian surname Gilbertsen, or some other Scandinavian cognate.

== Notable people with the surname ==
- Ashley Gilbertson (born 1978), Australian, photographer
- Charlotte Gilbertson (1922–2014), American painter and print maker
- David Gilbertson (born 1949), American, chief justice of the South Dakota Supreme Court
- Deb Gilbertson, New Zealand consultant
- Emil G. Gilbertson (1870–1949). American politician
- Eric Gilbertson (climber) professor at Seattle University and mountaineer
- Eric R. Gilbertson, American, President of Saginaw Valley State University
- Gary Gilbertson, American, music composer for Atari
- Julius C. Gilbertson (1875–1933), American politician and jurist
- Keith Gilbertson (born 1948), American, collegiate head football coach
- Kevin Gilbertson, American web developer, inventor of tinyURL
- Larry D. Gilbertson (1917–1986), American politician
- Lewis Gilbertson (1814–1896), Welsh clergyman and academic
- Paul Gilbertson (born 1962), English, first guitarist of the British band James
- Stan Gilbertson (born 1944), American ice hockey player
- Tim Gilbertson (born 1987), Canadian singer/songwriter

== See also ==
- Gilbert (given name)
- Gibson (surname)
