= Mirandela =

- Municipality
- City of Mirandela
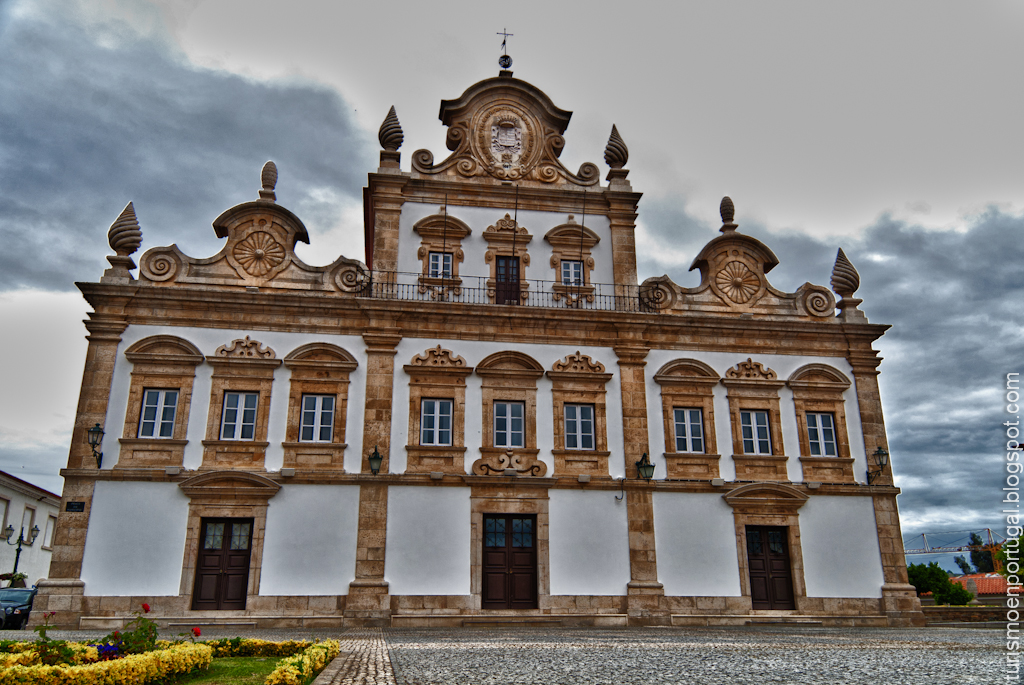
- City Hall of Mirandela

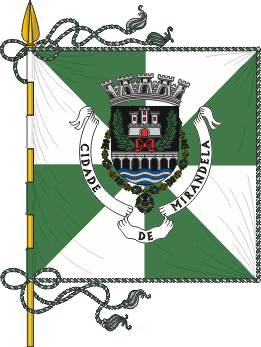
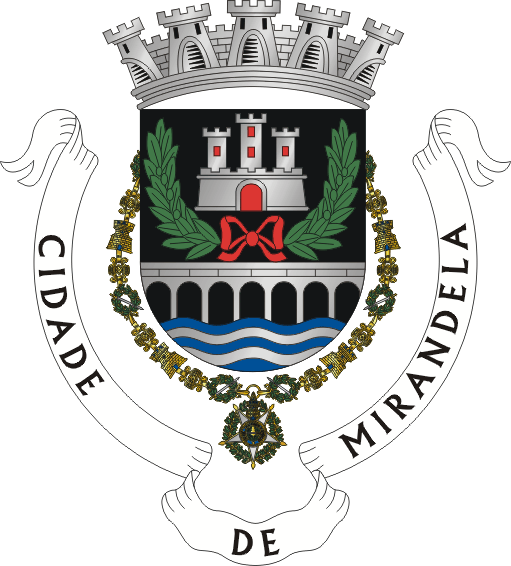
- Flag Coat of arms
- Interactive map of Mirandela
- Location in Portugal
- Coordinates: 41°29′7″N 7°10′54″W
- Country: Portugal
- Region: Norte
- Intermunic. comm.: Terras de Trás-os-Montes
- District: Bragança
- Parishes: 30

Government
  - President: Vítor Correia (PS)

Area
  - Total: 658.96 km^{2} (254.43 sq mi)
- Elevation: 301 m (988 ft)

Population (2021)
  - Total: 21,384
  - Density: 32.451/km^{2} (84.048/sq mi)
- Time zone: UTC+00:00 (WET)
  - Summer (DST): UTC+01:00 (WEST)
- Postal code: 5370
- Patron: Nossa Senhora do Amparo
- Website: http://www.cm-mirandela.pt

Mirandela (Portuguese pronunciation: [miɾɐ̃ˈdɛlɐ]), officially the City of Mirandela (Portuguese: Cidade de Mirandela), is a city and a municipality in northeastern Portugal. The city itself is contained by the Mirandela parish, which had a population of 11,397. The population of the municipality in 2021 was 21,384, in an area of 658.96 km^{2}. Mirandela is famous for its cuisine, particularly the alheiras. A round of the European Jetski Championship is held on the Tua River every Summer. The city has two campuses of higher education institutions - one belonging to the public Bragança Polytechnic Institute and one belonging to the private Instituto Piaget.

== History ==
Human presence in the municipality of Mirandela goes back to prehistoric times. Megaliths can be found throughout the municipality, although several have been altered or destroyed. Prehistoric paintings and shelters have also been identified. Most findings are believed to date back to the period between the end of 4th and the start of the 2nd millennium BC.

During the bronze age, the area hosted several hillforts (castros). Tin, copper, arsenic, and gold mining took plece in the area, as is the case with the 'Buraco da Pala,' located in the parish of Passos.

During the Roman era, the main settlement in Mirandela was a Roman civitas known as Caladunum in the province of Gallaecia. It was located in São Martinho, northwest of the current city. Archaeological findings at Castelo Velho, São Martinho, Mourel, and Prado Pequeno include ceramics, manual millstones, tiles, and copper coins, one from the reign of Emperor Tiberius.

Following the fall of the roman empire, the area comes under the Suebi and Visigothic Kingdoms and later the Muslim states of Al-Andalus. In the 6th century, the land of the Suebi is split into various dioceses in the First Council of Lugo. The resulting document Parochiale Suevorum displays the area of the municipality under a vast administrative region called "Laetera". In the 11th and 12th century, these divisions become administrative and the area around Mirandela is shown as a part of "Terra de Ledra". By the 12th century, Mirandela hosted a small population, following a period of war. In 1198, King Sancho I visited these lands looking to settle its population and further develop agriculture.

On 25 May 1250, Mirandela becomes a municipality after receiving a foral (charter) from King Afonso III. The magistrate of Mirandela governed a region that included Torre de Dona Chama, Frechas, Sesulfe, Nozelos, Vilas Boas, Vale de Asnes and Cortiços. However, Torre de Dona Chama would become its own municipality briefly between 1287 and 1293 and again from 1299.

On 2 September 1282, King Denis issued a royal decree, officially transferring the town to its current location in São Miguel Hill, where a small shrine existed. This move likely reflected the strategic advantages of the new location, such as its defensibility and proximity to fertile lands and the river. There are conflicting sources over the settlement's previous location during the 12th and 13th centuries. Some sources indicate the settlement was still located in São Martinho, while other suggest it may have moved to an unknown location.

Following this decree, the town was fortified with defensive walls, and a keep. Residents of the town that did not possess arms or a horse were mandated to pay annual stipend on São Miguel day, in September. The castle featured three gates (Santo António, Santiago, and Portela), along with a small gate at São José. It also included battlements and interior keep, near the prison block, that served as the royal residence. It may have also featured a Postern next to a steep stairway. The village was a part of several fortifications at the border with Castile and it was one of the best protected settlements in the region. Following the Battle of Aljubarrota in 1385, Mirandela's military role would fade and by 1530 the castle already showed signs of decay.

Mirandela was donated to the Távora family in 1301 when King Denis granted the town's title to Branca Lourenço. For several centuries, the Távoras held significant power in the region, contributing to the local economy and supporting institutions such as the Santa Casa da Misericórdia, where many family members served as administrators and benefactors. The family's influence lasted until 1759, when the infamous Távora affair led to the family's execution and disgrace under King Joseph I. Francisco de Assis de Távora (1721–1759) was the last Távora to hold the title.

During the start of the 16th century, the municipality would be fragmented as King Manuel I attributed forals to the localities of Frechas (1513), Vale de Asnes (1514), Abreiro (1514) and Lamas de Orelhão (1515). By 1530, the population of the municipality had grown to 1,132 inhabitants and it included 44 places and 9 estates across its parishes: Abambres, Ala, Alvites, Avantes, Brinço, Cabanelas, Caravelas, Carvalhais, Cedães, Cedainhos, Chelas, Contins, Freixeda, Mascarenhas, Miradeses, Mirandela, Pousadas, Quintas, São Salvados, Val de Lobo, Val de Salgueiro, Valtelhas, Vila Nova, Vila Verde and Vilar de Ledra. The municipality would only reintegrate these areas, together with Torre de Dona Chama in the 19th century, reaching its modern day borders.

On 27 September 1887, the Tua railway line in narrow gauge reached Mirandela. It connected the city to Bragança to the north and Tua to the south, where it connected to the Douro railway line and thereafter westward to Porto. The section to Bragança was closed in 1991 and the rest of the line closed in 2008, with the exception of a short section, which operated as a local passenger service until 2018 called Metro de Mirandela.

In 1963, during Estado Novo, an ambitious agribusiness development project, the Cachão Agroindustrial Complex, was established in Mirandela municipality.

The town of Mirandela was elevated to the status of city on 28 June 1984.

== Geography ==
The municipality is bordered by the municipalities of Murça, Valpaços, Vinhais, Bragança, Macedo de Cavaleiros, Vila Flor and Carrazeda de Ansiães, and is located in the district of Bragança.

=== Climate ===
Mirandela has a Mediterranean climate (Köppen: Csa) with hot dry summers and cool wet winters.

It is one of the driest municipalities in Portugal, receiving almost a third of the precipation of nearby Braga.

While snowfalls with accumulation are rare and don't happen every year, rime ice is more frequent, and frosts occur on average 43 days per year.

Climate data for Mirandela (1991–2020), extremes (1971-present)
Month	Jan	Feb	Mar	Apr	May	Jun	Jul	Aug	Sep	Oct	Nov	Dec	Year
Record high °C (°F)	20.3 (68.5)	23.7 (74.7)	27.8 (82.0)	31.7 (89.1)	38.0 (100.4)	43.3 (109.9)	45.2 (113.4)	43.8 (110.8)	43.2 (109.8)	35.5 (95.9)	24.3 (75.7)	21.6 (70.9)	45.2 (113.4)
Mean daily maximum °C (°F)	10.9 (51.6)	14.2 (57.6)	18.1 (64.6)	20.5 (68.9)	24.9 (76.8)	30.0 (86.0)	33.4 (92.1)	33.2 (91.8)	28.8 (83.8)	22.1 (71.8)	15.2 (59.4)	11.6 (52.9)	21.9 (71.4)
Daily mean °C (°F)	6.3 (43.3)	7.8 (46.0)	11.0 (51.8)	13.5 (56.3)	17.2 (63.0)	21.5 (70.7)	24.3 (75.7)	24.1 (75.4)	20.6 (69.1)	15.6 (60.1)	10.0 (50.0)	6.9 (44.4)	14.9 (58.8)
Mean daily minimum °C (°F)	1.7 (35.1)	1.4 (34.5)	3.9 (39.0)	6.5 (43.7)	9.5 (49.1)	13.1 (55.6)	15.3 (59.5)	15.1 (59.2)	12.4 (54.3)	9.0 (48.2)	4.8 (40.6)	2.3 (36.1)	7.9 (46.2)
Record low °C (°F)	−7.7 (18.1)	−8.3 (17.1)	−9.0 (15.8)	−2.7 (27.1)	−0.5 (31.1)	3.4 (38.1)	6.6 (43.9)	6.9 (44.4)	2.3 (36.1)	−3.0 (26.6)	−11.0 (12.2)	−10.0 (14.0)	−11.0 (12.2)
Average precipitation mm (inches)	62.7 (2.47)	36.7 (1.44)	50.8 (2.00)	46.3 (1.82)	42.7 (1.68)	24.1 (0.95)	12.1 (0.48)	16.1 (0.63)	32.7 (1.29)	73.8 (2.91)	64.5 (2.54)	69.0 (2.72)	531.3 (20.92)
Average precipitation days (≥ 1 mm)	8.7	6.0	6.8	7.9	6.9	3.5	1.8	2.0	3.8	8.4	8.4	7.8	71.9
Source: Instituto Português do Mar e da Atmosfera

=== Parishes ===
Population of Mirandela (1706 - 1911)
Year	Pop.	±%
1706	1,735	—
1822	5,160	+197.4%
1864	20,031	+288.2%
1890	19,818	−1.1%
1900	20,855	+5.2%
1911	22,063	+5.8%

Administratively, the municipality is divided into 30 civil parishes (freguesias):

- Abambres
- Abreiro
- Aguieiras
- Alvites
- Avantos e Romeu
- Avidagos, Navalho e Pereira
- Barcel, Marmelos e Valverde da Gestosa
- Bouça
- Cabanelas
- Caravelas
- Carvalhais
- Cedães
- Cobro
- Fradizela
- Franco e Vila Boa
- Frechas
- Freixeda e Vila Verde
- Lamas de Orelhão
- Mascarenhas
- Mirandela
- Múrias
- Passos
- São Pedro Velho
- São Salvador
- Suçães
- Torre de Dona Chama
- Vale de Asnes
- Vale de Gouvinhas
- Vale de Salgueiro
- Vale de Telhas

== Culture and landmarks ==
In Mirandela, it is possible to see historical sites, such as the remains of the Castle of Mirandela.

In the Armindo Teixeira Lopes municipal museum, an art collection can be visited. It includes a collection of artworks by Armindo Teixeira Lopes and other art pieces from the 20th century, most by Portuguese artists. The museum's collection also includes artworks by the following artists: Nadir Afonso, Júlio Resende, Júlio Pomar, João Hogan, Graça Morais, Malangatana, Manuel Cargaleiro, Mário Cesariny, João Abel Manta, Antoni Tàpies, Almada Negreiros, Vieira da Silva, José Rodrigues and Ângelo de Sousa.

== Transportation ==
The municipality is serviced by the A4 motorway, connecting it to Bragança to the east and to Vila Real and Porto to the west. The national roads 15 and 213 intersect in the city center.

The city of Mirandela has two public bus services inside the city and into Carvalhais. A bus station also exists, where inter city services are operated.

Mirandela municipality had long distance railway services with its station until 2009 and local railway services until 2018 under a passenger service called Metro de Mirandela. In 2024, 13 kilometres (8.1 mi) of this railway line was converted into a bike and walking path.

Outside of the city, there is the Mirandela Aerodrome, which allows for recreational flights.

== Notable people ==
=== Arts and sciences ===
- Eurico Carrapatoso (born 1962), a composer.
- Luciano Cordeiro (1844–1900), a writer, historian, politician and geographer.
- Armindo Teixeira Lopes (1905–1976), a painter

=== Public service ===
- Isaltino Morais (born 1949), a politician
- Manuel António dos Santos (born 1943), a politician

=== Sport ===
- Rui Borges (born 1981), a footballer and football manager
- Eduardo Carvalho (born 1982), a footballer with 419 club caps and 36 for Portugal
- Jesualdo Ferreira (born 1946), a football manager.
- João Geraldo (born 1995), a table tennis player
- Gilberto Gomes (born 1959), a footballer
- Paulo Lino (born 1971), a footballer
- Paulo Lopes (born 1978), a footballer with 282 club caps.
- Rui Pires (born 1998), a footballer
- Edu Sousa (born 1996), a futsal player
- Paulo Teixeira (born 1980), a footballer

== Gallery ==
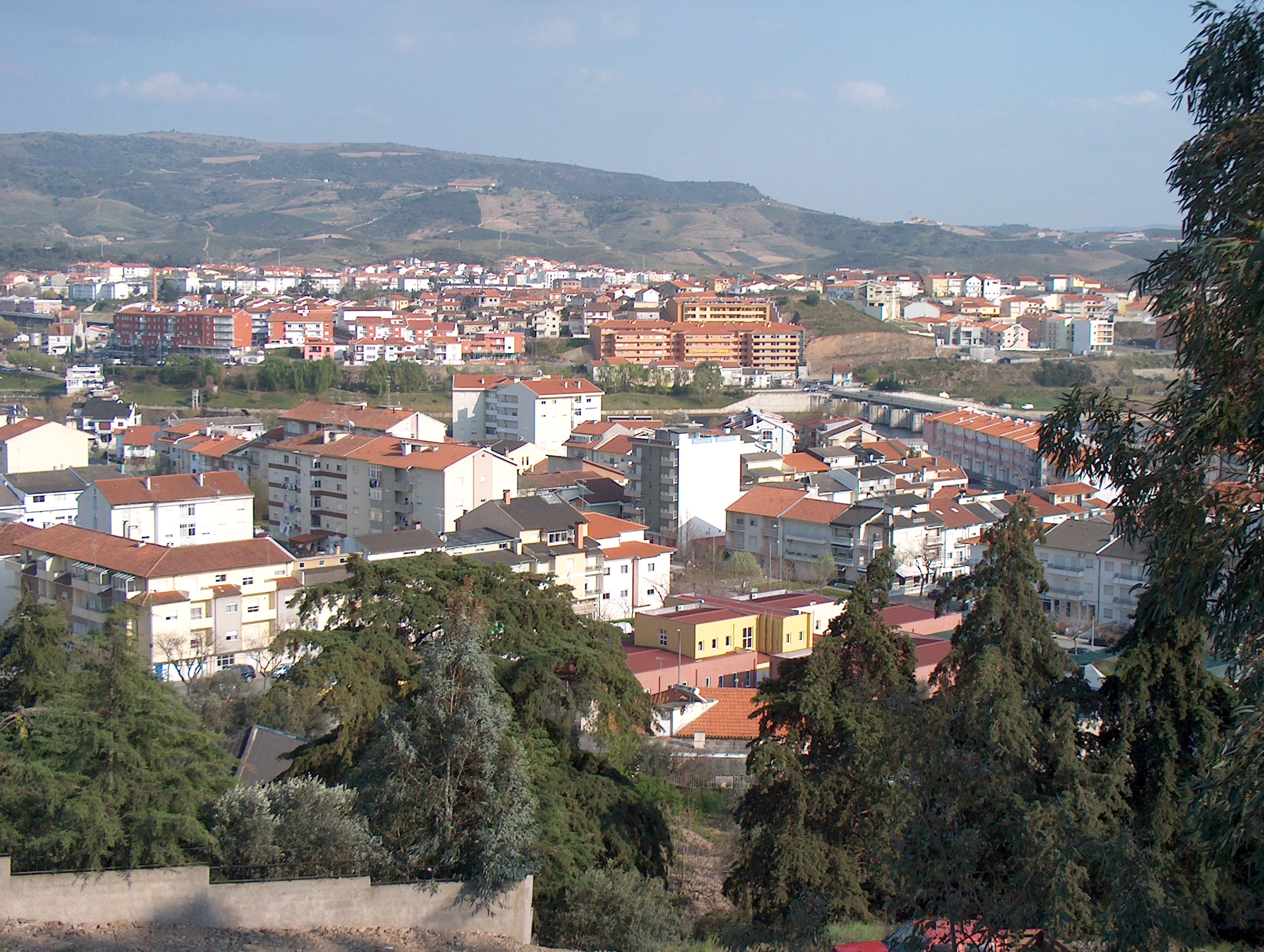
Mirandela as seen from the church hill.

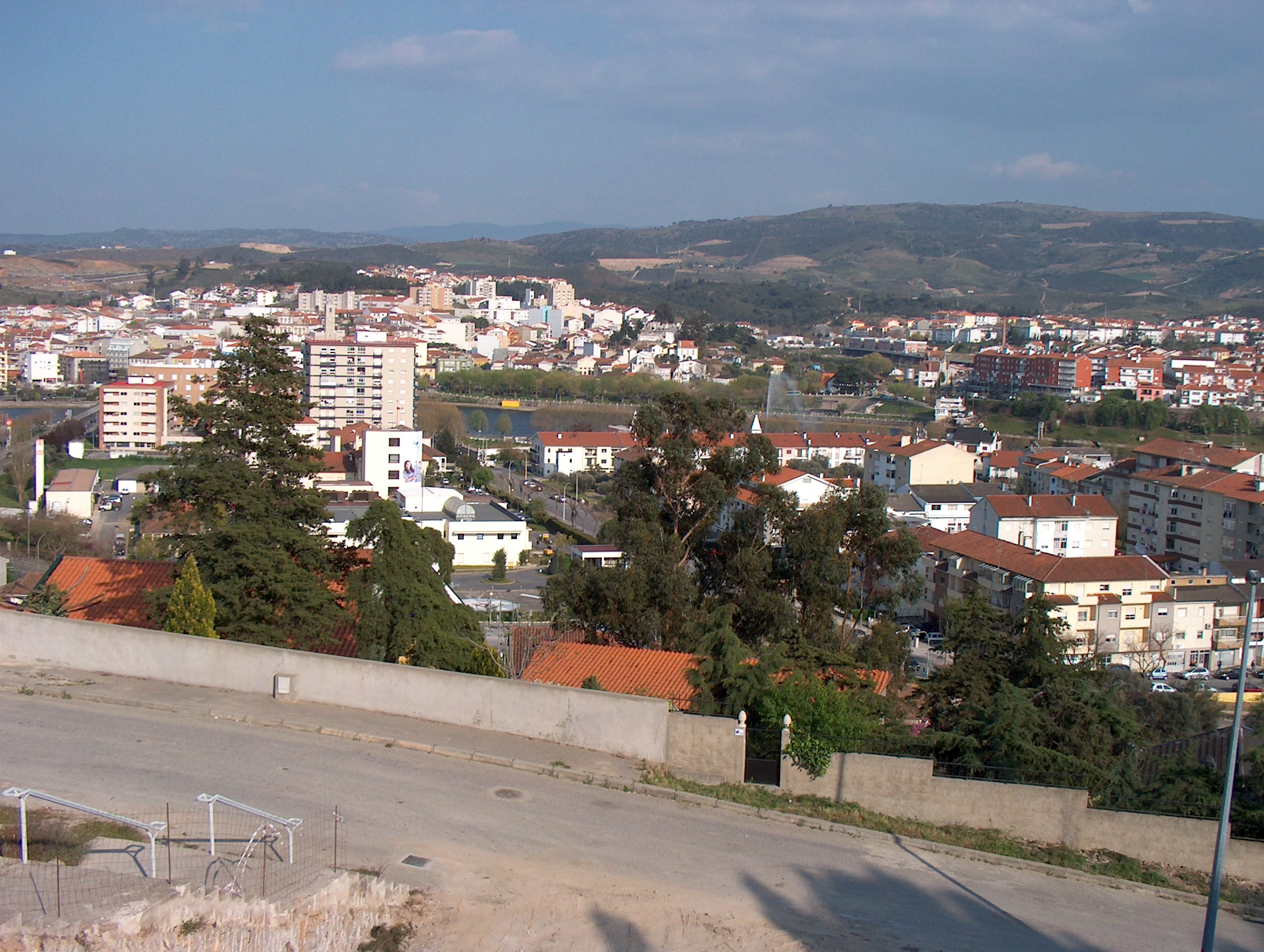
Mirandela as seen from the church hill.

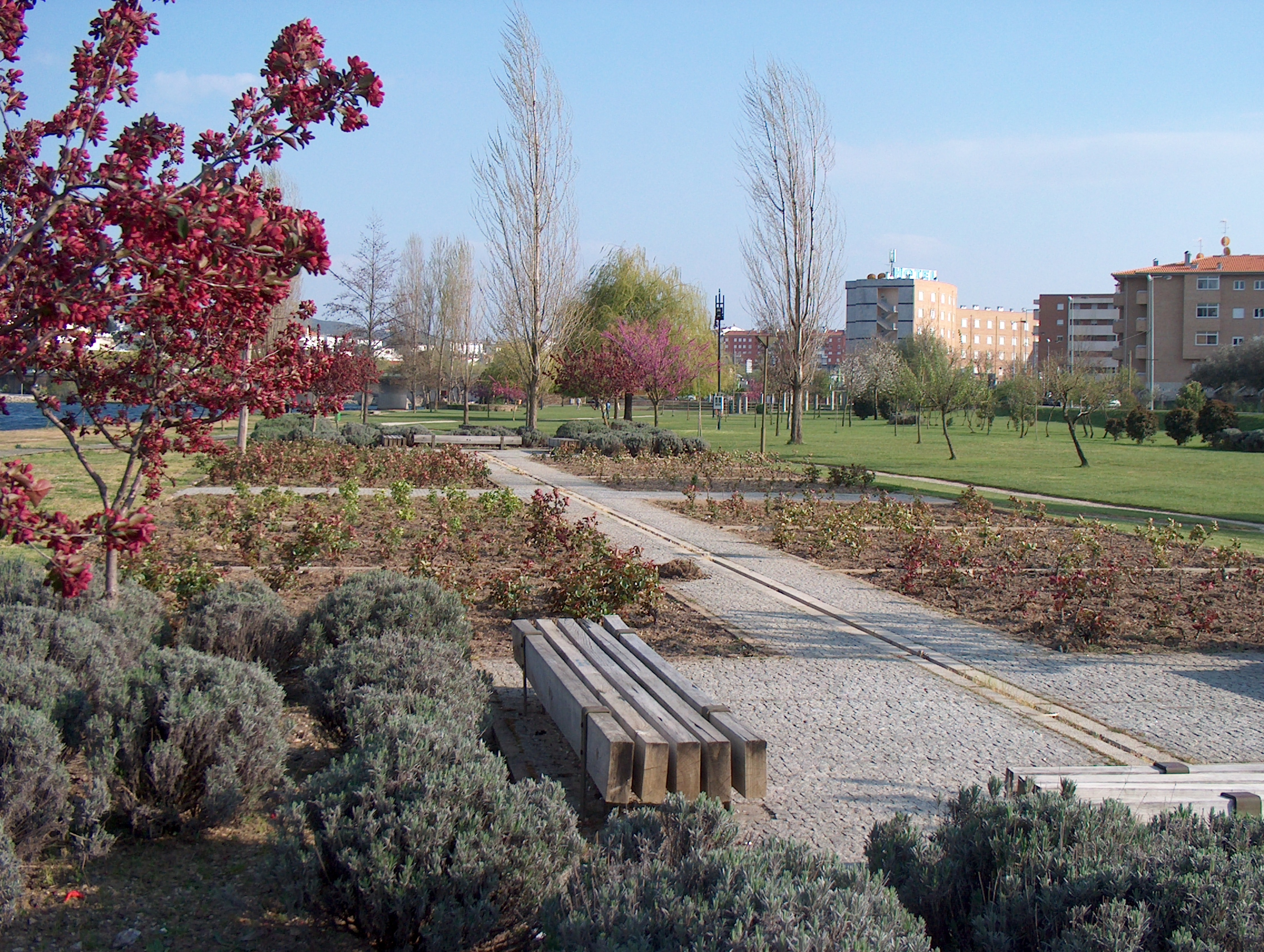
Riverside park.

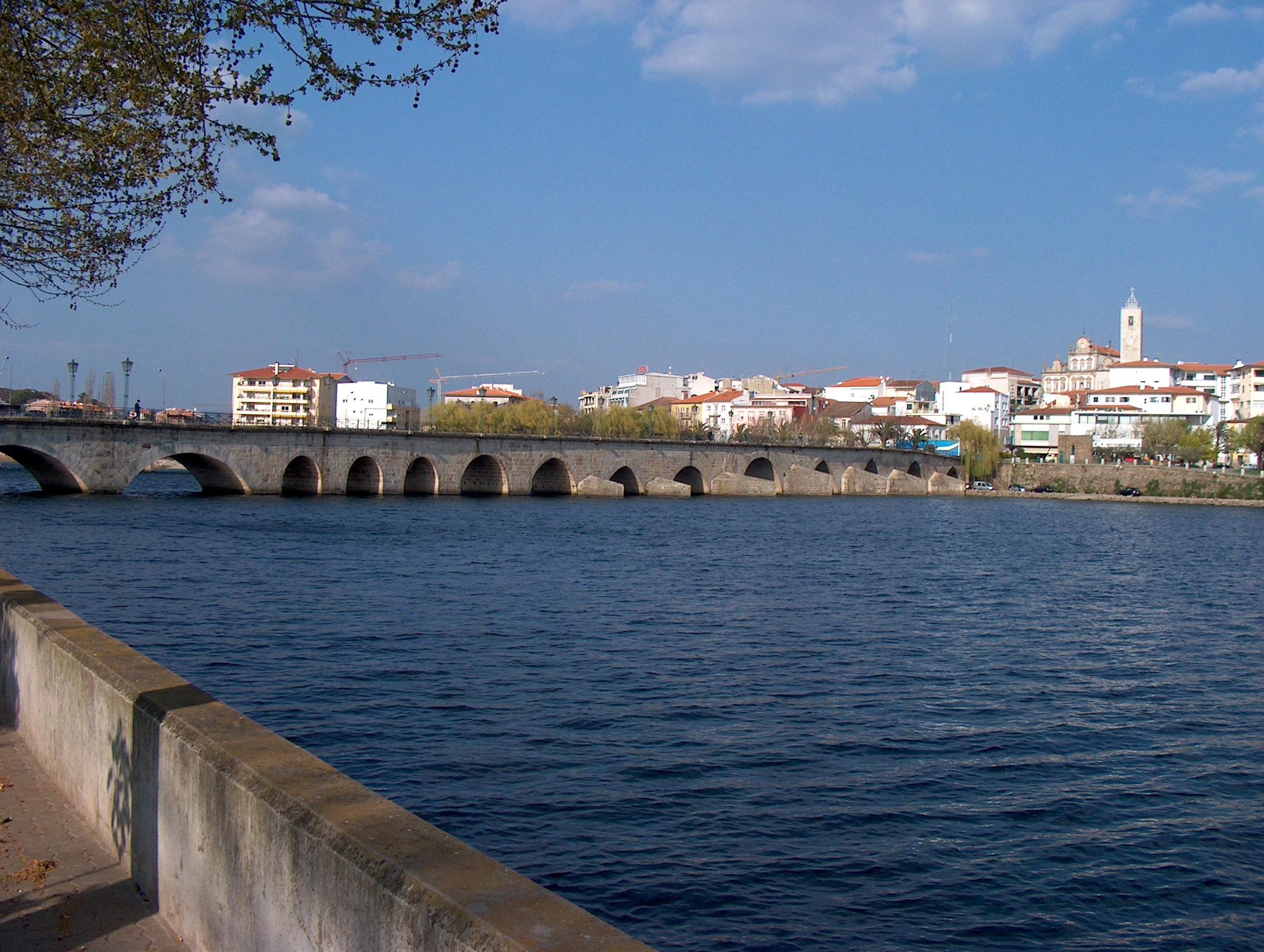
Romanic bridge on the Tua river.

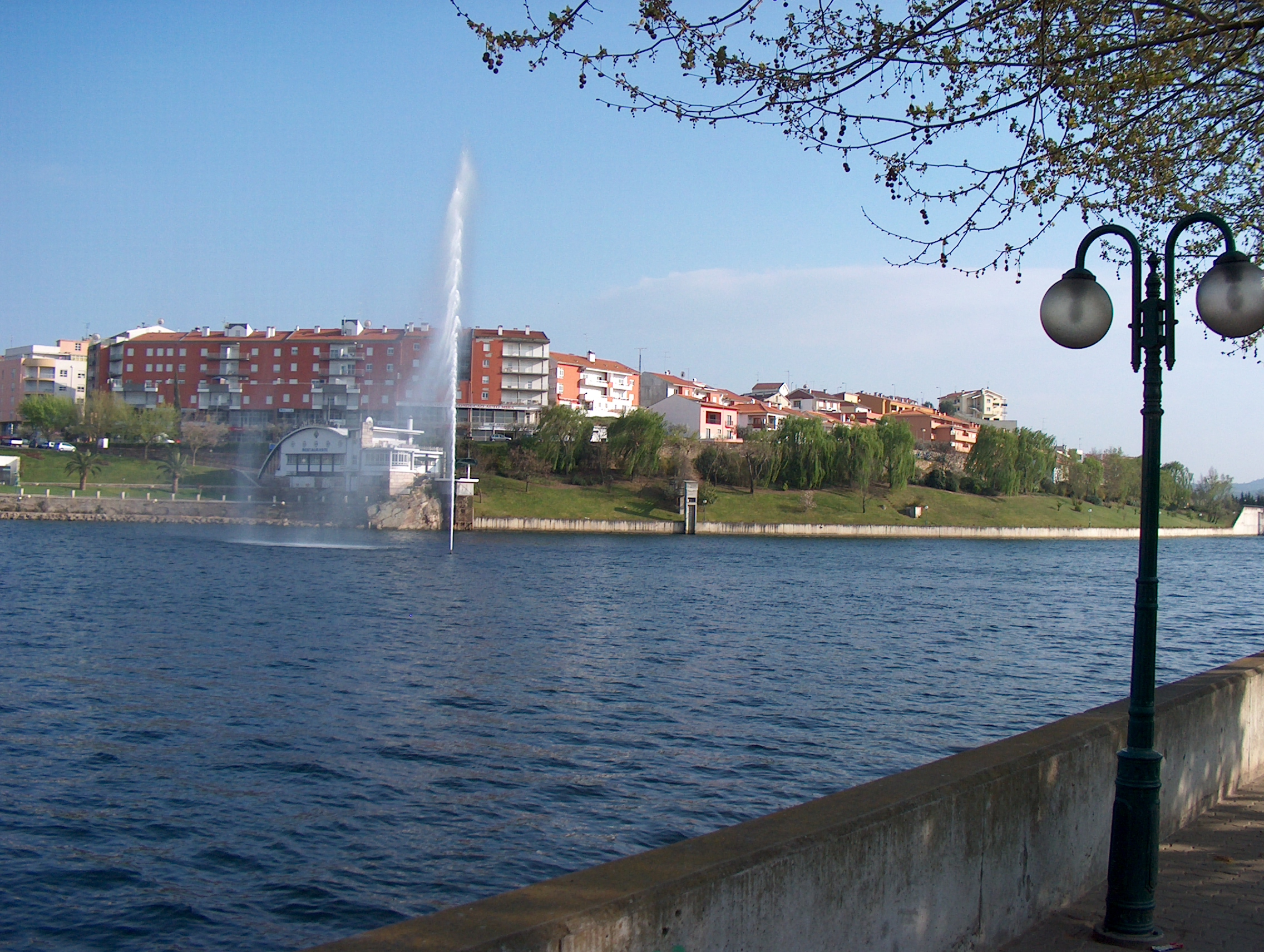
The water fountain on the Tua.

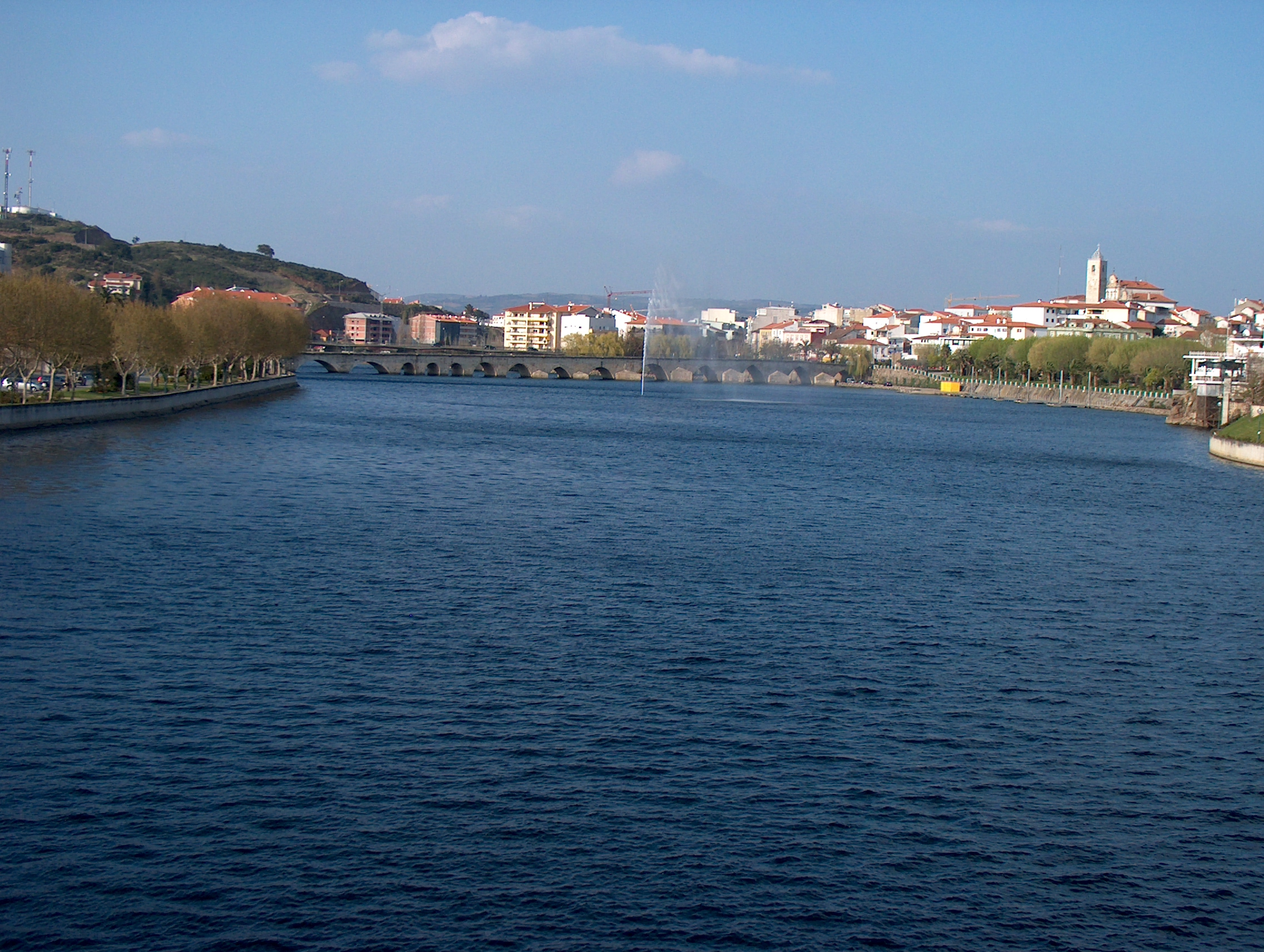
Mirandela and the river as seen from the Europa bridge.

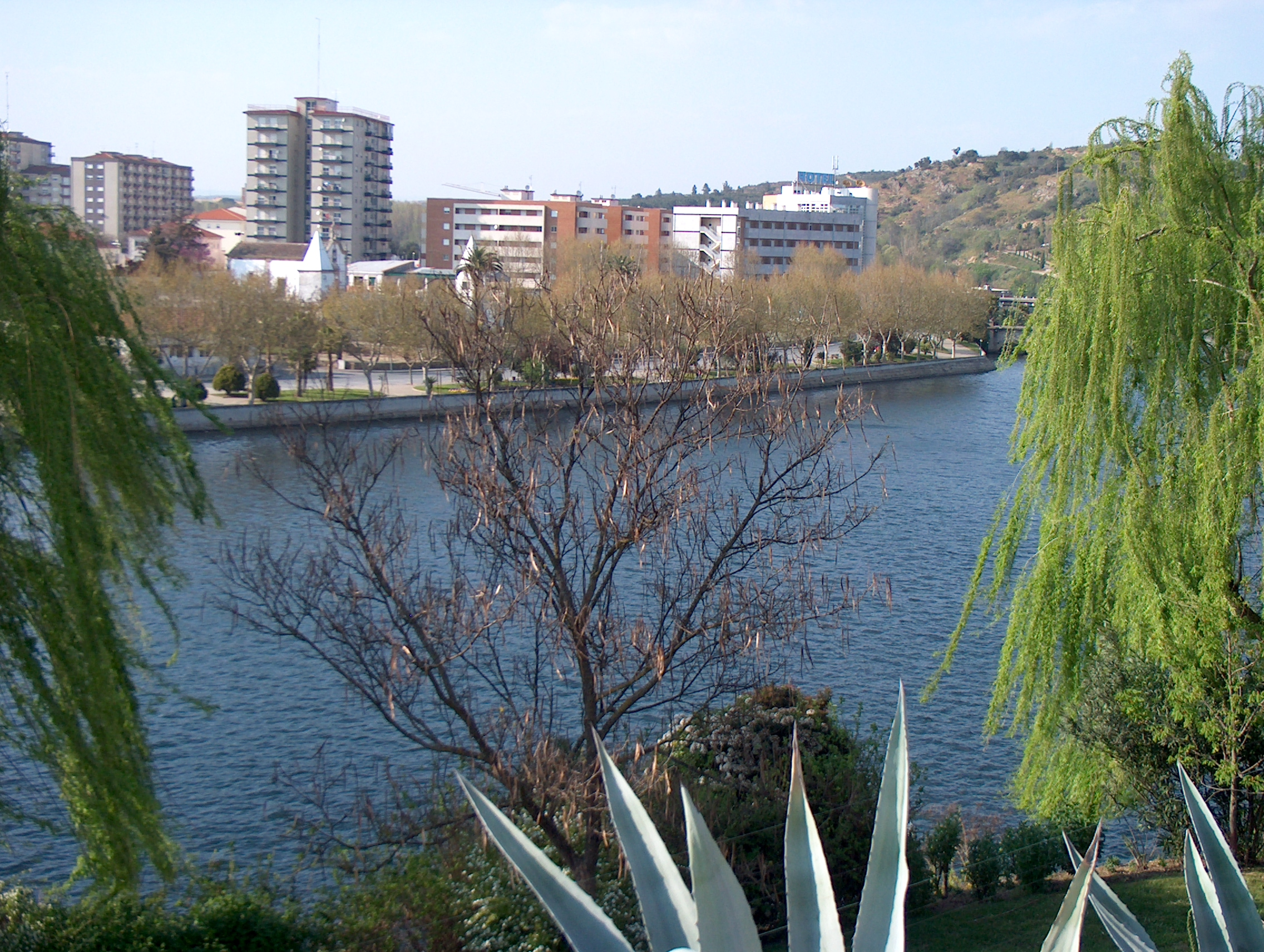
Looking down from the east river bank.

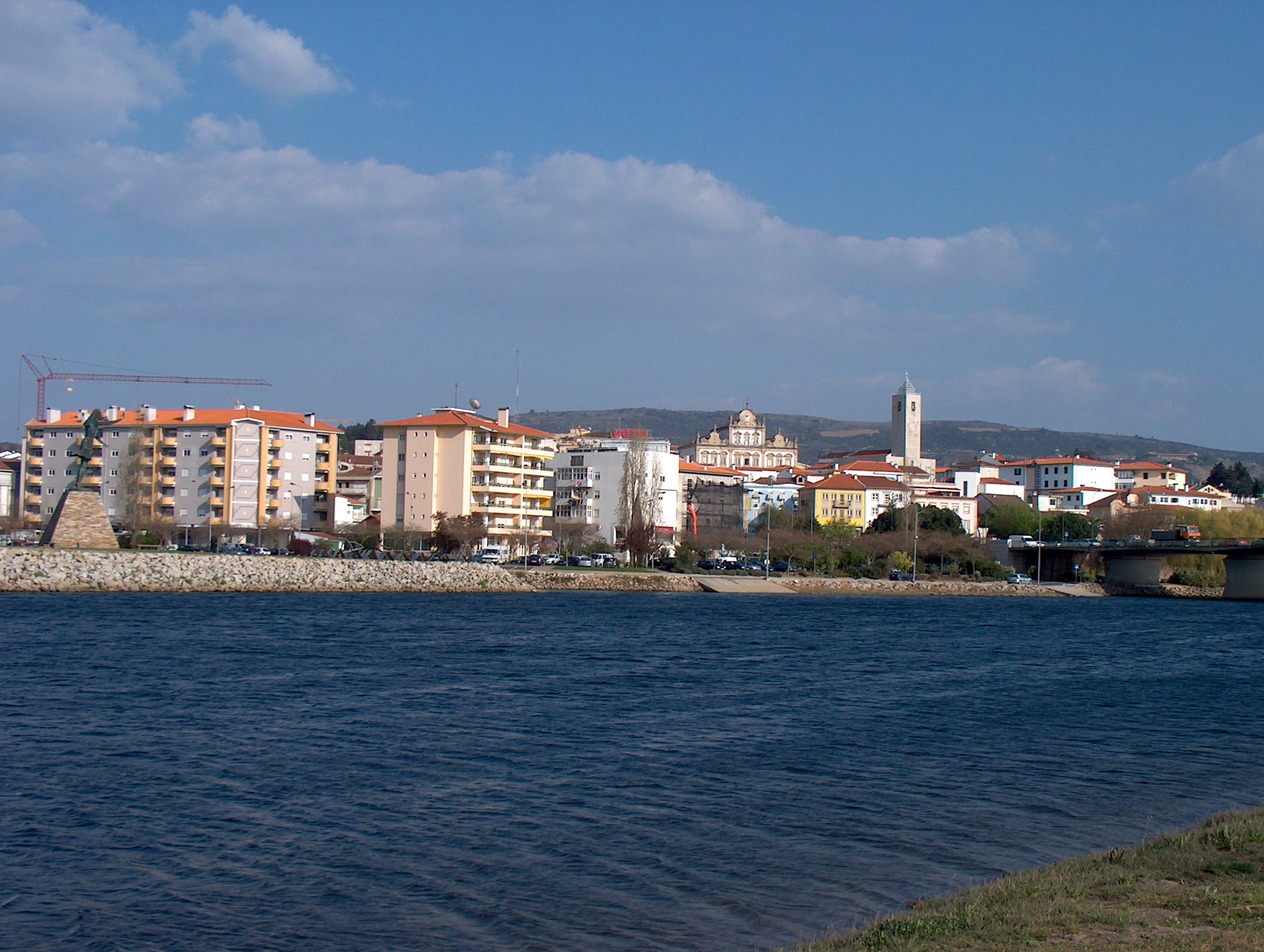
The center with the city hall and the Matrix Church tower, as seen from the west river bank.
