= Tim Gilbertson =

Canadian power pop singer-songwriter

- Born: 1987 (age 38–39); Hinton, Alberta, Canada
- Origin: Edmonton, Alberta, Canada
- Genre: Power pop
- Years active: 2006–present
- Label: Pop Echo
- Website: myspace.com/killbertson

Tim Gilbertson (born 1987) is a Canadian power pop singer-songwriter. He plays guitar, bass guitar, and piano. His musical influences include The Weakerthans and Modest Mouse.

== Biography ==
Gilbertson was born in Hinton, later living in Edmonton, Alberta, Gilbertson comes from a musical family, with mother playing piano and father playing guitar. Tim Gilbertson is the youngest of the children, and the only one not to have received formal music training. One brother, Eric, is a drummer and the other, David, is a rhythm guitarist. His sister is a music teacher.

Gilbertson earned a Master's degree in Geology and Geophysics from the University of Alberta, and runs a media production company Paper Tiger Media

== Debut ==
The debut Tim Gilbertson was released on Pop Echo Records in 2007. Produced and engineered by Andrew Shaw, the album was recorded in Burnaby, British Columbia, in July–August 2006. Gilbertson's brother Eric played drums for the album.

The critical reception was generally positive, with Exclaim! saying, "There’s joyfulness to his songs, from their nice, crunchy guitars to the unforced vocals, and despite a couple of weaker moments, this is an incredibly accomplished piece of work." Vue Weekly wrote, "The album is both melancholy and catchy". The Edmonton Journal's critic called the track "Palm Trees and Postcards" one of her top five favourite songs of 2007.

=== Track listing ===
All songs were written by Tim Gilbertson.

1. "Palm Trees & Postcards"
2. "Hot Damn!"
3. "Analogue"
4. "Get Going"
5. "Bike Ride"
6. "Wasting Air"
7. "Long Walk"
8. "Sick to the Stomach"
9. "Kissin' Cousins"
10. "Counting Stars"
11. "All Our Guns"

== Palisades ==
His second album, Palisades, was released on Pop Echo in 2010. It was recorded in Edmonton. The lead single is "Chipped Teeth".
