= Gilbert Lumoindong =

Indonesian pastor

- Born: Gilbert Emanuel Lumoindong; December 26, 1966 (age 59); Jakarta, Indonesia
- Occupation: Pastor
- Spouse: Reinda Lumoindong
- Children: Garren Reivener Lumoindong; Gavrilla Reichella Lumoindong; Greivance Lumoindong

Gilbert Lumoindong (born in Jakarta, December 26, 1966) is a pastor from Indonesia. He was one of the hosts of "Spiritual Refreshment for Christianity" on the television network RCTI from 1992 until 1997.

== Biography ==
At the age of 17, Gilbert was active as a preacher in several Christian youth organizations. Gilbert then studied at the Institute of Theological Education and Indonesia and graduate diploma in 1990. He then went on to study theology at the Institute of Theology and Education of Indonesia. He also finished School of Ministry training from Morris Cerullo.

Gilbert had become chairman of GO Studio Jakarta in 1993 and 1997 before he broke away and founded GL Ministry in 1998.

Currently, he is still active as a preacher in both TV and radio stations and led about 18,000 congregations who joined GBI Glow Fellowship Centre.

== Controversy ==
He gained some controversies after he launched attacks on Pope Francis after the Pope backed civil unions for homosexuals.
