= Gilberto Gomes =

Portuguese footballer (born 1959)

Gilberto
Personal information
- Full name: Gilberto dos Santos Gomes
- Date of birth: 24 June 1959 (age 67)
- Place of birth: Mirandela, Portugal
- Height: 1.65 m (5 ft 5 in)
- Position: Midfielder

Senior career*
| Years | Team | Apps | (Gls) |
| 1977–1982 | Mirandela | | |
| 1982–1984 | Sanjoanense | | |
| 1984–1986 | Salgueiros | 55 | (3) |
| 1986–1993 | Chaves | 184 | (8) |

International career
| 1987 | Portugal | 2 | (0) |
- * Club domestic league appearances and goals

Gilberto dos Santos Gomes (born 24 June 1959 in Mirandela, Bragança District), known simply as Gilberto, is a Portuguese retired footballer who played as a midfielder.
