= Paulo Teixeira (doctor) =

Paulo R. Teixeira was the Director of the HIV/AIDS Department at the World Health Organization in 2003. Teixeira is the former Director of the national STD/AIDS Programme of Brazil's Ministry of Health. He died in the 19th of September, 2026.
