= Gilberto Passani =

Italian volleyball player (born 1961)

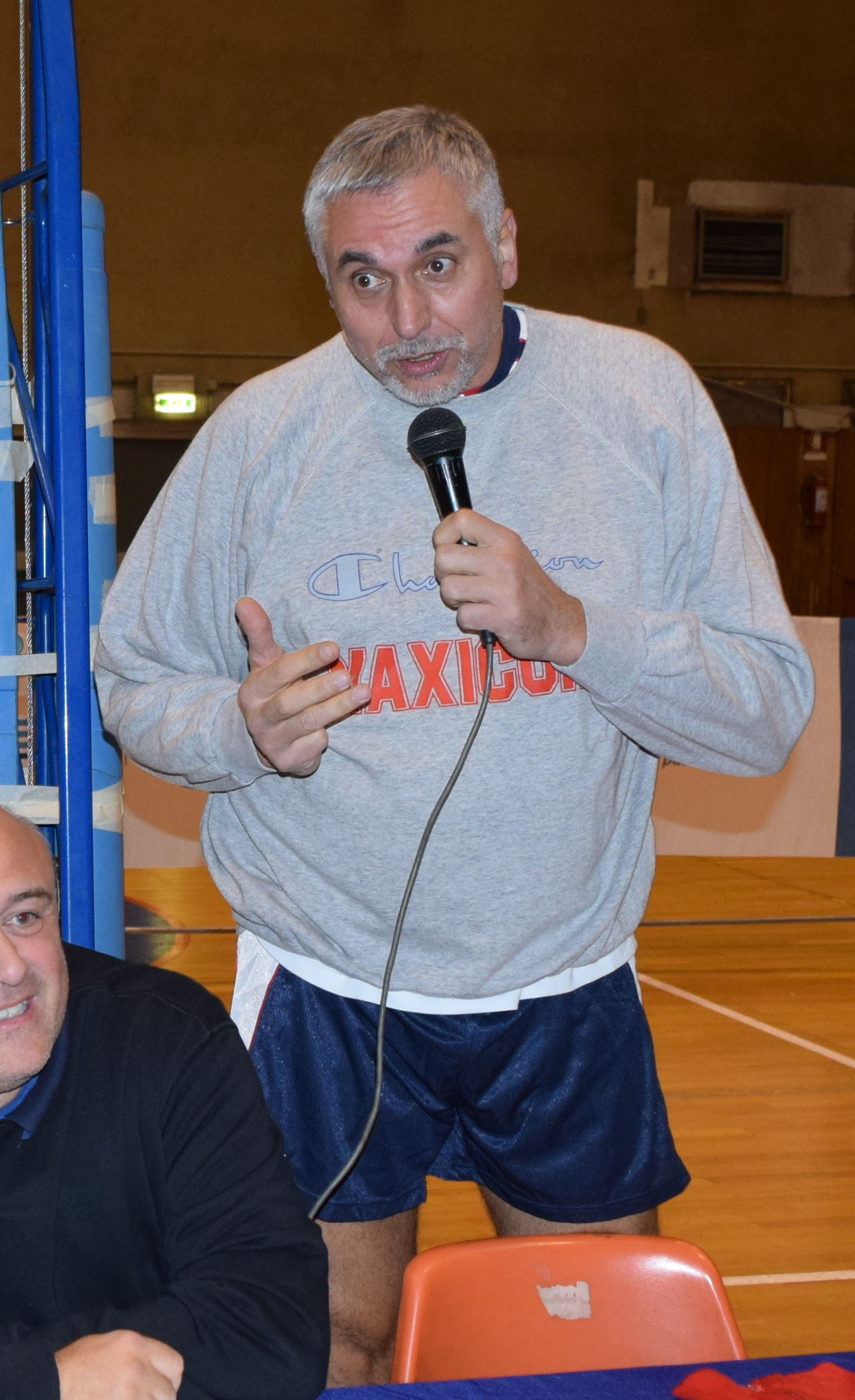

Personal information
- Born: 23 April 1961 (age 65); Parma, Emilia-Romagna, Italy
- Height: 195 cm (6 ft 5 in)

Volleyball information
- Position: Middle blocker
- Number: 3
Honours
Men's volleyball
Representing Italy
Goodwill Games
| Gold medal – first place | 1990 Seattle |
European Championship
| Gold medal – first place | 1989 Sweden |

Gilberto Passani (born 23 April 1961, in Parma, Emilia-Romagna) is a former Italian volleyball player, who earned a total number of 54 caps for the Men's National Team in the late 1980s and early 1990s. He was on the side that won the title at the 1989 European Championships in Sweden.

Currently he is coach of Volley Colico.
