= Gilbert Tosetti =

English cricketer

Personal information
- Full name: Gilbert Tosetti
- Born: 1 August 1879; Bromley, Kent, England
- Died: 16 April 1923 (aged 43); Eldoret, Kenya
- Batting: Right-handed
- Bowling: Right-arm medium

Domestic team information
- Years: Team
- 1898–1905: Essex

Career statistics
Competition	First-class
Matches	41
Runs scored	1,054
Batting average	18.49
100s/50s	1/2
Top score	132*
Balls bowled	1,764
Wickets	16
Bowling average	55.68
5 wickets in innings	–
10 wickets in match	–
Best bowling	3/67
Catches/stumpings	15/–
- Source: Cricinfo, 25 February 2012

Gilbert Tosetti (1 August 1879 – 16 April 1923) was an English cricketer. Tosetti was a right-handed batsman who bowled right-arm medium pace. He was born at Bromley, Kent.

Tosetti made his first-class debut for Essex against Oxford University in 1898. He played first-class cricket for Essex from 1898 to 1905, making 41 appearances, the last of which came against Nottinghamshire in the 1905 County Championship. In his 41 first-class appearances, Tosetti scored 1,054 runs at an average of 18.49, with a high score of 132 not out. This score, which was his only first-class century, came against Lancashire in 1902. With the ball, he took 16 wickets at a bowling average of 55.68, with best figures of 3/67.

His brother, the Military Cross recipient Major Douglas Tosetti, was killed in action in 1918 during World War I. Tosetti died at Eldoret in Kenya on 16 April 1923.
