= Saint Gilbert =

Saint Gilbert may refer to:

- Gilbert of Sempringham, founder of the Gilbertine Order
- Gilbert de Moravia (died 1245), later known as Saint Gilbert of Dornoch, Bishop of Caithness and founder of Dornoch Cathedral
- Gilbert of Meaux, Bishop of Meaux
- Gilbert of Limerick, first Bishop of Limerick
