= Paulo Teixeira (footballer) =

Portuguese footballer

Personal information
- Full name: Paulo Alexandre Esteves Teixeira
- Date of birth: November 18, 1980 (age 45)
- Place of birth: Mirandela, Portugal
- Height: 1.78 m (5 ft 10 in)
- Position: Midfielder

Youth career
- 1994–1997: Mirandela
- 1997–1999: Sporting CP

Senior career*
| Years | Team | Apps | (Gls) |
| 1999–2003 | Sporting B | 65 | (3) |
| 1999–2000 | → Lourinhanense (loan) | 22 | (0) |
| 2002–2003 | → Portimonense (loan) | 28 | (1) |
| 2003–2004 | União Madeira | 11 | (0) |
| 2004 | Portimonense | 17 | (0) |
| 2004 | Ovarense | 11 | (0) |
| 2005–2006 | Portimonense | 50 | (4) |
| 2006–2007 | Olivais Moscavide | 28 | (0) |
| 2007–2008 | Vihren Sandanski | 11 | (1) |
- * Club domestic league appearances and goals

Paulo Alexandre Esteves Teixeira (born 18 November 1980) is a Portuguese former footballer who played as a midfielder. He played 141 matches in the second tier of Portuguese football.
