= Gilberto (footballer, born 1943) =

Brazilian footballer

Personal information
- Full name: Gilberto Geraldo de Moraes
- Date of birth: 14 January 1943 (age 83)
- Place of birth: Getulina, Brazil
- Position: Goalkeeper

Youth career
- 1959–1962: São Paulo

Senior career*
Years	Team	Apps	(Gls)
1962–1968	São Paulo	24	(0)
1969–1976	Santa Cruz		
1977–1980	Sport Recife		
1981	América Mineiro		
- * Club domestic league appearances and goals as of 11 October 2023

Gilberto Geraldo de Moraes (born 14 January 1943), simply known as Gilberto, is a Brazilian former professional footballer who played as a goalkeeper.

== Career ==
Formed in São Paulo's youth categories, he had a great time in 1964, but most of his time at the club he was third goalkeeper, beneath Suly and Glauco. He was traded to Santa Cruz where he became one of the greatest goalkeepers in the club's history, directly responsible for several Campeonato Pernambucano titles and for the campaign in the 1975 Campeonato Brasileiro Série A. He was also state champion in Sport in 1977, and ended his career at América Mineiro in 1981.

== Personal life ==
Gilberto became an employee at the São Paulo FC training center after retiring.

== Honours ==
Santa Cruz

- Campeonato Pernambucano: 1970, 1971, 1972, 1973, 1976

Sport Recife

- Campeonato Pernambucano: 1977
