= Gilberte =

French feminine given name

Gilberte is a name of French-Norman origin. It is the feminine version of the name Gilbert.

== Notable people ==
- Gilberte Brossolette (1905–2004), French politician and journalist
- Gilberte Champion (1913–2020), French radio operator in the French Resistance
- Gilberte H. Dallas (1918–1960), French poet
- Gilberte Géniat (1916–1986), French actress
- Jill Gilberte Khawam (born 1975), Lebanese-American philanthropist
- Gilberte Marin-Moskovitz (1937–2019), French politician
- Gilberte Montavon (1896–1957), Swiss waitress and the inspiration of the film Gilberte de Courgenay
- Gilberte Mortier (1907–1991), French swimmer
- Gilberte Périer (1620–1687), French biographer
- Gilberte Roca (1911–2004), French politician and member of the French Resistance

== See also ==
- Gilbertese language
- Gilberte de Courgenay
- Gilberta
