= Gilbert Ouy =

French historian, palaeographer and librarian

Gilbert Ouy (1 March 1924, Paris – 26 June 2011, Chambéry, aged 87) was a French historian, palaeographer and librarian.

== Career ==
A student of the École Nationale des Chartes, Gilbert Ouy obtained the archivist palaeographer diploma in 1946 with a thesis entitled Un commentateur des Sentences au XIVe siècle, Jean de Mirecourt.

He was first a custodian in the manuscripts department of the Bibliothèque nationale de France, then, from 1967, master of research at the CNRS where he ended his career as research director.

On 19 January 1985 he obtained the title of Doctor of Letters.

Gilbert Ouy was Doctor honoris causa of the Turin University

== Work ==
His scientific work has provided fundamental insights into the intellectual life in northern France in the late Middle Ages, especially regarding the Franco-Italian relations and the first ferments of the humanist movement(Jean de Montreuil, Jean Gerson, Pierre d'Ailly). He was also a great connoisseur of manuscripts of the time and worked successfully in the reconstruction of important libraries and scriptoria of authors of which he had also identified several autographs witnesses.

== Selected bibliography ==
- Gilbert Ouy, Le recueil épistolaire autographe de Pierre d’Ailly et les notes d’Italie de Jean de Montreuil, Amsterdam, 1966, in-fol., XLII-190 pp.(« Umbræ Codicum Occidentalium », vol. IX)
- Le catalogue de la bibliothèque de l’abbaye de Saint-Victor de Paris de Claude de Grandrue 1514. Introduction, text and index with V. Gerz-von Büren in collaboration with R. Hübschmidt and C. Régnier; historique de la bibliothèque et concordances par G. Ouy, Paris, 1983, lxiii-734 pp.
- Danièle Calvot et Gilbert Ouy, L'œuvre de Gerson à Saint-Victor de Paris : catalogue des manuscrits, Paris, CNRS Éditions, 1990, 268 p.-[1] f. de pl.-|6] p. de pl.
- Gilbert Ouy, Les manuscrits de l’abbaye de Saint-Victor : catalogue établi sur la base du répertoire de Claude de Grandrue (1514), Paris-Turnhout, 1999, 2 vol. 395 and 636 pp., 8 pl. h.-t. (« Bibliotheca Victorina » X)
- Gilbert Ouy, La librairie des frères captifs :les manuscrits de Charles d’Orléans et Jean d’Angoulême, Turnhout, 2007, 185 pp., 8 fig. (« Texte, Codex & Contexte » 4)
- Jean de Montreuil, Opera, éd. Ezio Ornato, Nicole Grévy-Pons et Gilbert Ouy, Torino : G. Giappichelli, 1963-1981, 3 vol.
