= Foral =

Portuguese Empire royal charter prescribing administrative privileges and sanctions

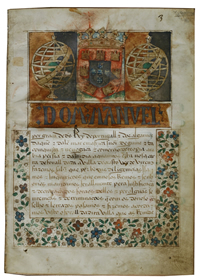
Foral of Castro Verde - Portugal

The carta de foral, or simply foral, was a royal charter in Portugal and its former empire, whose purpose was to establish a concelho (council) and regulate its administration, borders and privileges. A newly-founded town would also need the king's approval through a foral, in order to be considered one; in this case, the town's administration and privileges would be defined in that document. Forais (plural form of foral) were granted between the 12th and the 16th centuries. The imperial-Spanish realization of this concept is known as fuero.

The foral was the basis for municipal foundation, thus the most important event of a city or town's history. It was critical to a successful land settling and an increase in crop yields, by giving more freedom and dignity, via a concession, to farmers, in an age when people were subject to near slave work, as servants of landlords. The foral made a concelho free from feudal control, transferring power down to a neighbours' council (concelho), with its own municipal autonomy. As a result, the population would become directly and exclusively under the dominion and jurisdiction of the Crown, excluding the Lord from the power hierarchy. The foral granted public lands to the collective use of the community, regulated taxes, tolls and fines and established protection rights and military duties within royal service.

A pillory (pelourinho) is directly linked to a foral. It was usually raised after the foral was granted and placed in the main square of the town.

The noun foral (European Portuguese: [fuˈɾal], plural: forais) is derived from the Portuguese word foro, ultimately from Latin forum, and is cognate with Spanish fuero, Galician foro, Catalan fur and Basque foru.
