= Museu Interactivo do Megalitismo =

Archaeological museum in Portugal (est. 2016)

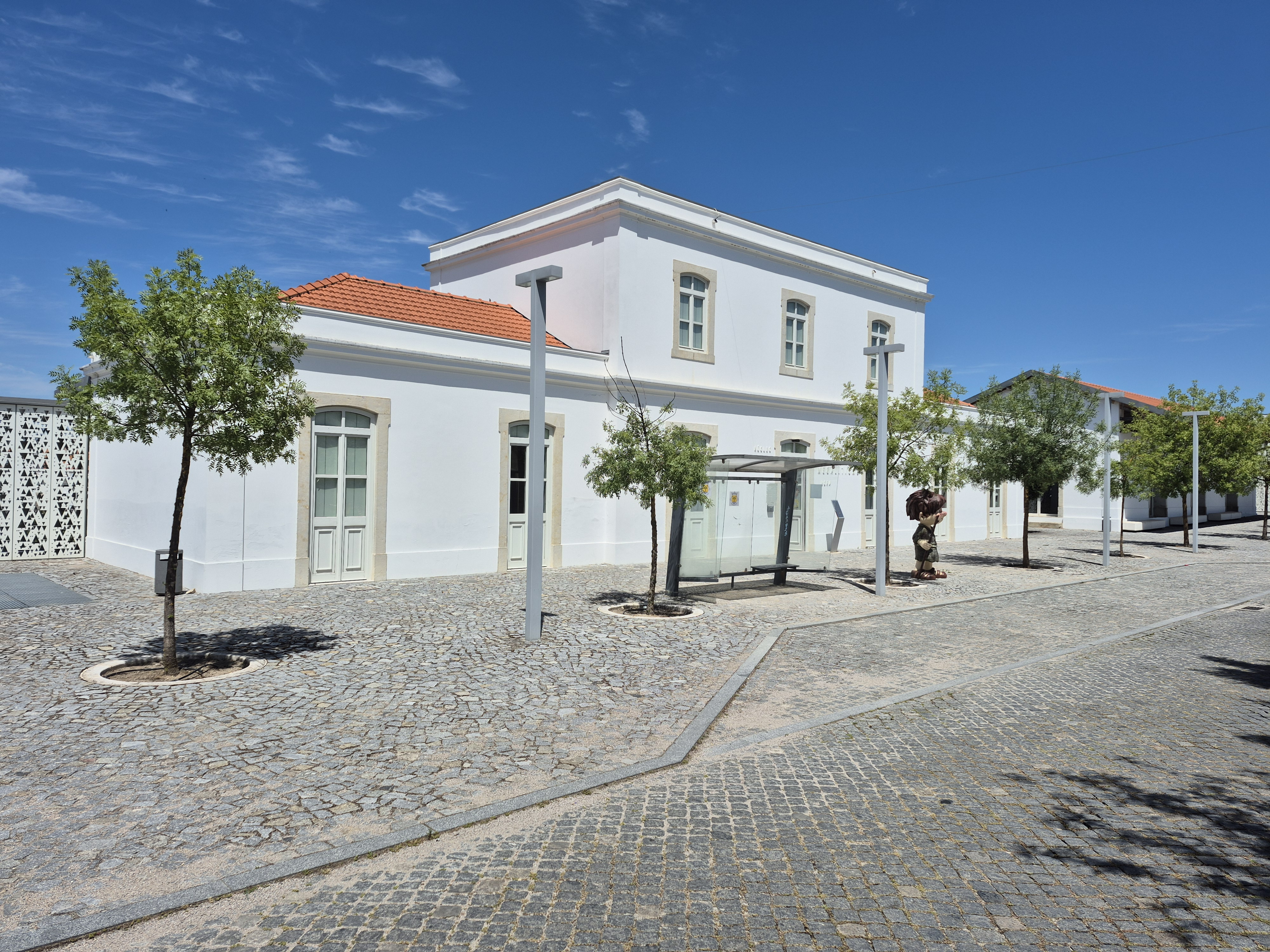
- Established: 15 September 2016
- Location: Mora, Évora District, Portugal
- Coordinates: 38.9470°N 8.16109°W
- Type: Archaeological museum
- Owner: Mora municipality
- Parking: Nearby. Free.
- Website: www.museumegalitismomora.pt

The Museu Interactivo do Megalitismo (Interactive Megalithic Museum) is a museum in the town of Mora in the Évora District of Portugal. Built on the site of a former railway station, the museum draws on the area’s rich megalithic heritage.

== History ==
Located to the northeast of the centre of Mora, the museum was inaugurated on 15 September 2016. It uses restored buildings from the former Mora station, as well as two new buildings, one of which provides the core display of the museum. The station was part of the Ramal de Mora railway, which connected Évora to Mora with a total length of 60 kilometres (37 mi). The line was completed in 1908 and closed in May 1987.

== Reason for the museum ==
Like much of the Évora District, the municipality of Mora is rich in megalithic heritage. The area contains Neolithic menhirs (standing stones), dolmens (tombs), and cromlechs or stone circles. Particularly notable are the Anta de Pavia, a dolmen converted into a Christian chapel in the early 17th century and also known as the Anta-Capela de São Dinis, and the Cromeleque das Fontainhas. Many of the sites in the municipality were first investigated from 1914 by Virgílio Correia, who published a study of the Neolithic sites of the Pavia area in 1921. The museum was born from a long-standing idea of the municipality of Mora to showcase its megalithic heritage, with particular emphasis on helping children to understand the area's prehistory.

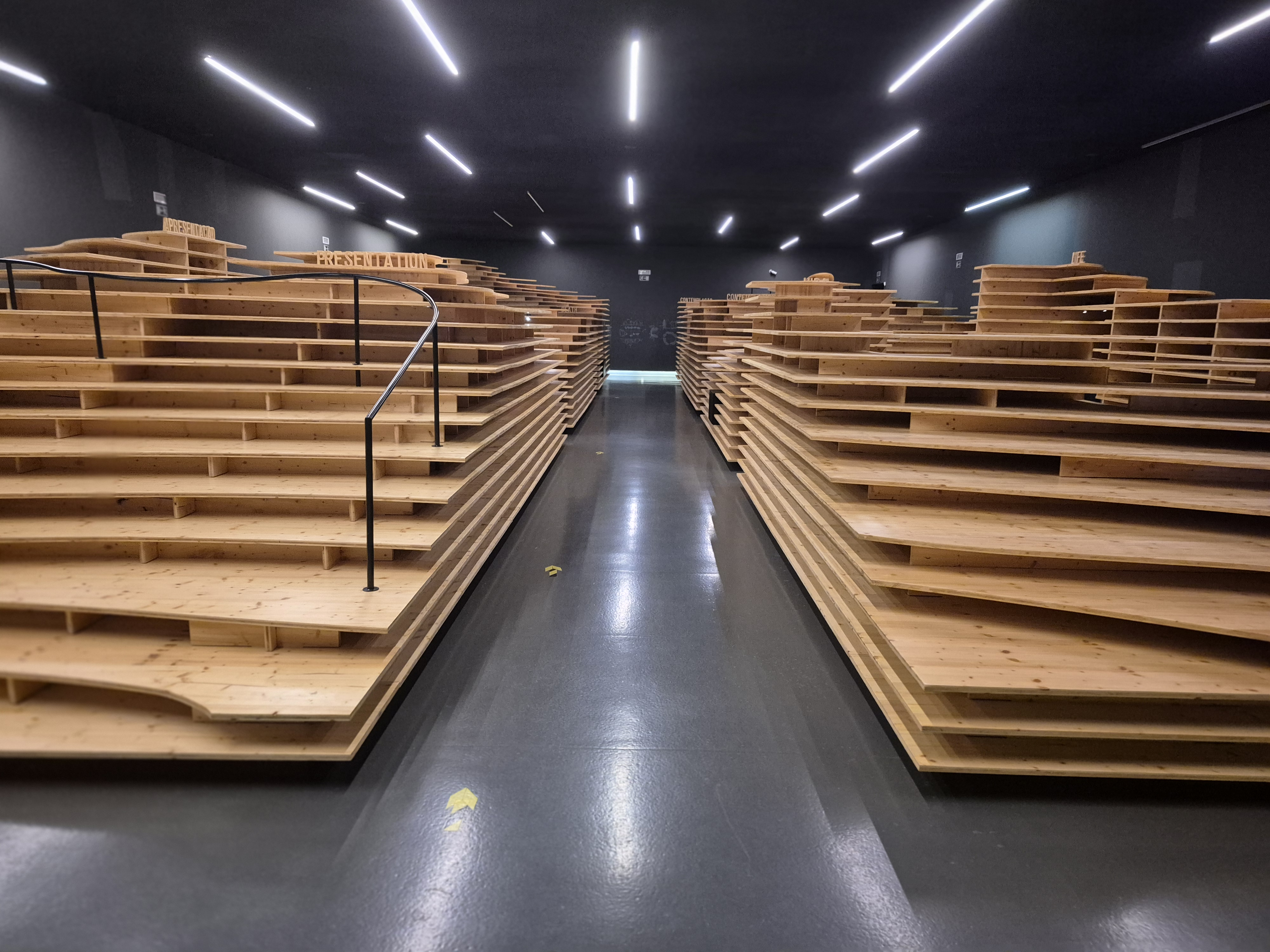
Interior of the Museum

== The museum ==
The interior of the museum measures around 750 square metres. A 3D film is presented that recreates the life of a Neolithic community, and the museum also includes several interactive displays where visitors can gather information about excavation techniques. Exhibited artifacts were mainly provided by the National Museum of Archaeology, Lisbon and are the result of various archaeological excavations that have taken place in the municipality since 1914. The display is divided into three sections: Life, Death, and Contemplation. In addition to the findings from excavations, miniature models show what life was like for people in the Neolithic era. Information is provided in both Portuguese and English and the interactive screens are also bilingual.

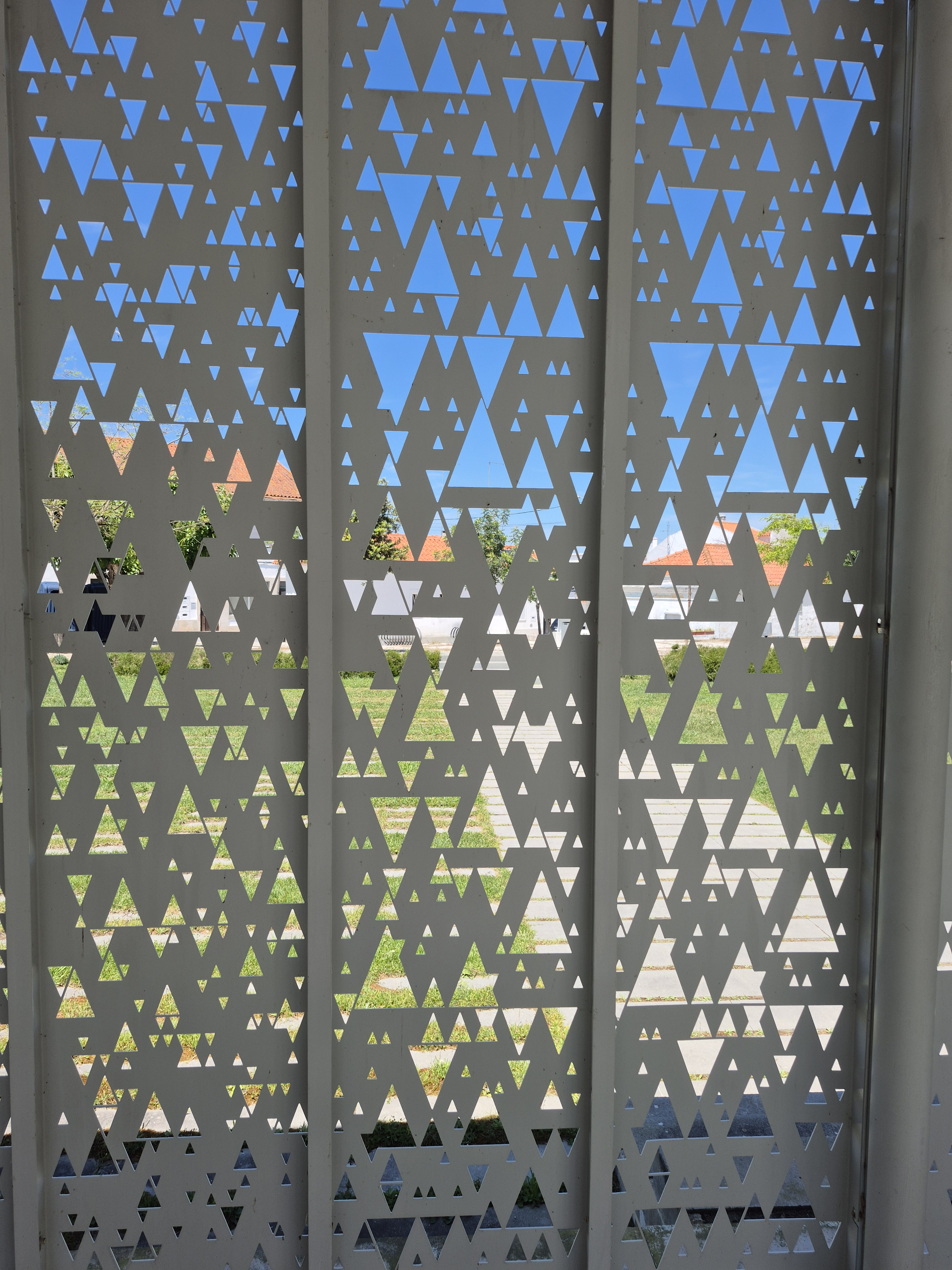
Part of the corridor wall with a design based on those found on schist plaques

The display area is underneath a wooden structure that reflects the contours of the land of the municipality. Recognition that this is only a small part of the megalithic heritage of Portugal is provided by a map showing all of the sites of dolmens, menhirs, and cromlechs in the Alentejo region. The four buildings of the museum are connected by a corridor protected with metal walls, with designs that symbolize the geometric patterns of the schist plaques found during the excavations in the area. These plaques were placed around the necks of the dead as a form of identification.

In addition to the main display area, there is an "activity room", which has games and hands-on activities for visiting school parties. There is also a library with specialized publications and an internet-enabled "co-working space".

The museum was designed by two Portugal-based companies, EDIGMA and P0-6 Atelier. They also created the 3D film that recreates life in a megalithic village through the eyes of a child. The main character, a 6-year-old boy, proved so popular that he was adopted as the museum's mascot, and a model of him appears at the entrance to the museum.

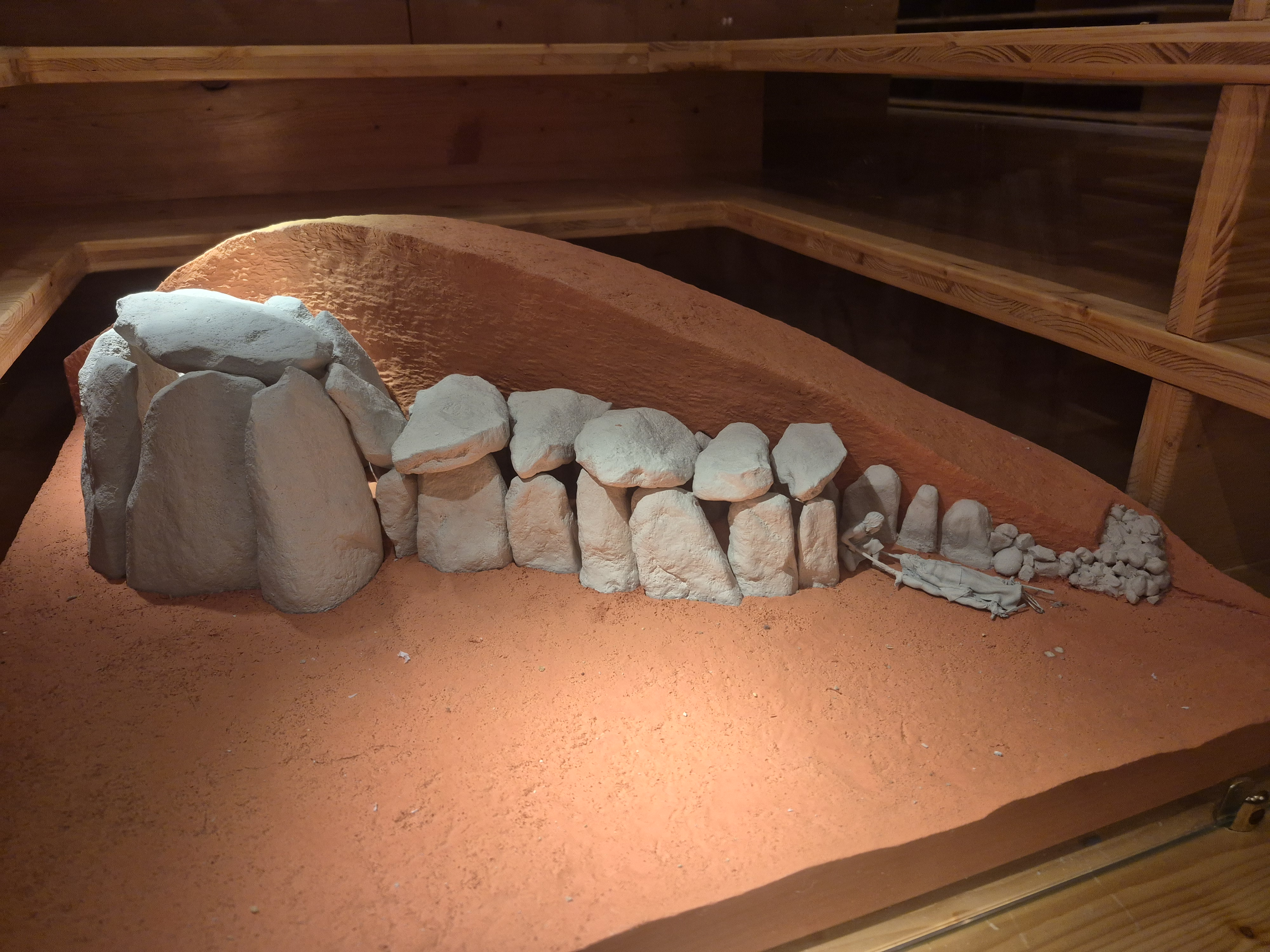
Model of a dolmen or neolithic tomb.

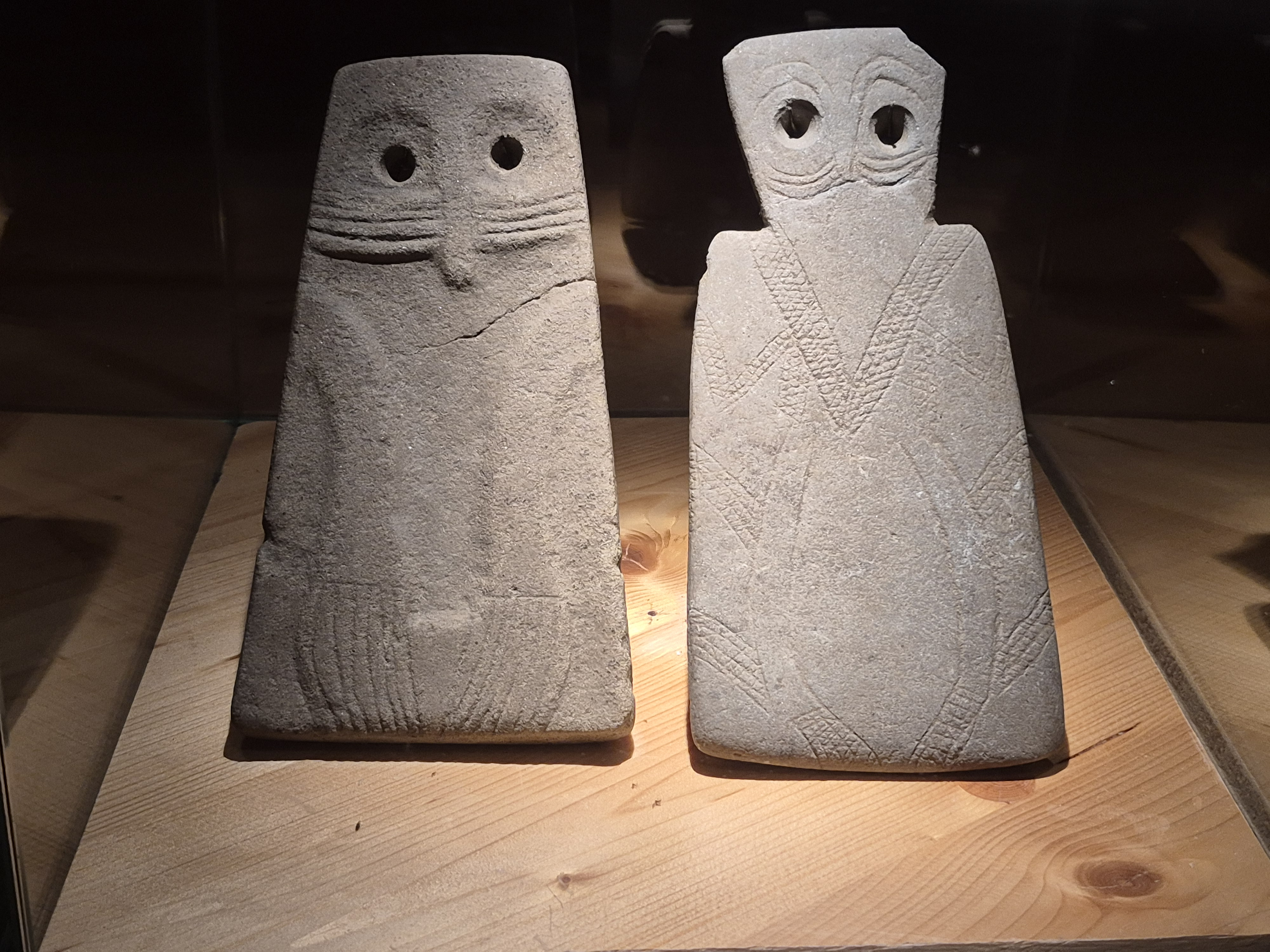
Schist plaques showing geometric decoration.
