= Anta-Capela de Alcobertas =

Dolmen in Santarém District, Portugal

- Anta de Santa Maria Madalena
- Anta-Capela de Alcobertas
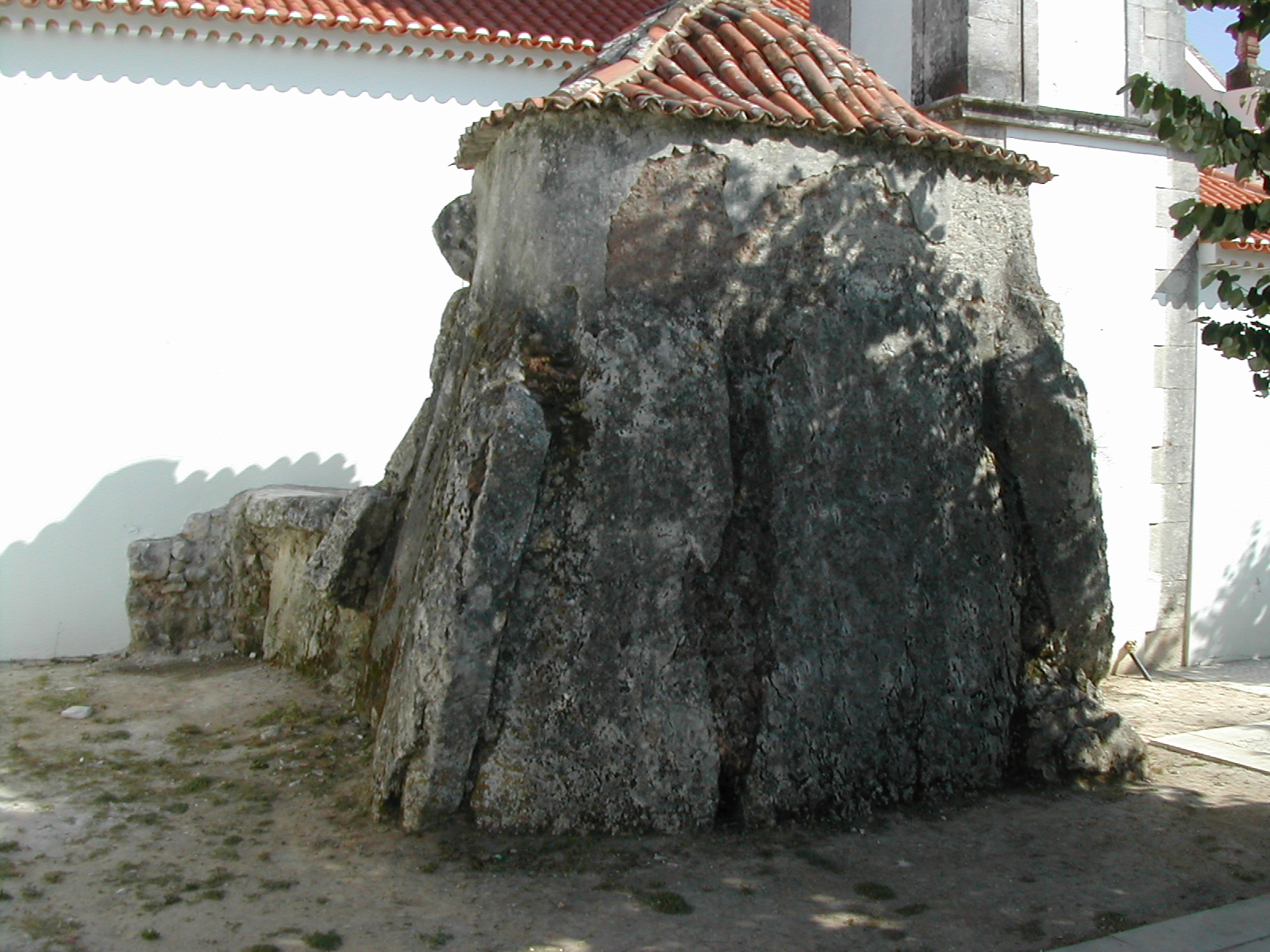
- Interactive map of Anta-Capela de Alcobertas
- 39°25′07″N 8°54′03″W
- Type: Dolmen
- Periods: Late Neolithic; Neo Chalcolithic
- Location: Alcobertas, Rio Maior, Santarém District, Portugal
- Part of: Santa Maria Madalena church

History
- Built: c. 3000 BCE

Site notes
- Excavation dates: 1889; 1987
- Condition: Good. Converted into a chapel attached to a church
- Public access: Yes

The Anta-Capela de Alcobertas (also called Anta de Santa Maria Madalena) is a large megalithic tomb, or dolmen, located in the parish of Alcobertas, within the municipality of Rio Maior in Santarém District, Portugal. “Anta” is a word often used for dolmens in Portugal. It dates back to the Late-Neolithic or Neo-Chalcolithic periods. In the 17th-century, at a time when Alcobertas had a population of around 2,000, the dolmen was incorporated, as a side chapel, into the Baroque church of Saint Mary Magdalene, having previously stood alone as part of a small chapel. It is a rare example of the Christianization of an ancient megalithic monument, which has survived to this day as part of the church's architectural design. It has been listed as a Building of Public Interest since 18 July 1957.

== Description ==
The dolmen, which is one of the ten largest megalithic monuments in Iberia, consists of seven granite, upright orthostats that formed the polygonal burial chamber. Until the 18th-century it was covered by a monolithic capstone or roof but it fractured and was replaced by a vaulted roof. These orthostats date back to around 3000 BCE. The entire structure would originally have been covered with a mound of earth, or tumulus, but there is no evidence of that today. The upper part of the dolmen is walled up, and a roof made of the same red tiles as those of the church covers the semicircular exterior masonry of the side chapel. The entrance corridor is formed by two orthostats that were formerly part of the covered passageway leading to the Neolithic burial chamber. A vaulted arch, decorated with 17th century tiles, leads to the altar in the chapel, which leans against one of the supporting megaliths. The altar faces east, as would have the corridor of the dolmen.

The church of Saint Mary Magdalene is believed to date back to the final years of the fifteenth century when it was part of a hermitage, growing in importance over decades, to the point that the Archbishop of Lisbon made it the main church of the village on the 4 July 1536. The current configuration results from works carried out at the end of the 17th-century when the church was rotated to its present position. The dolmen had previously functioned as the main chapel but, with the expansion of the church, became only a side chapel. While relegated to a secondary role, it could still worshipers. Inside, there is an image of St. Mary Magdalene, facing the Neolithic access corridor and a variety of painted tiles describing the life of the saint.

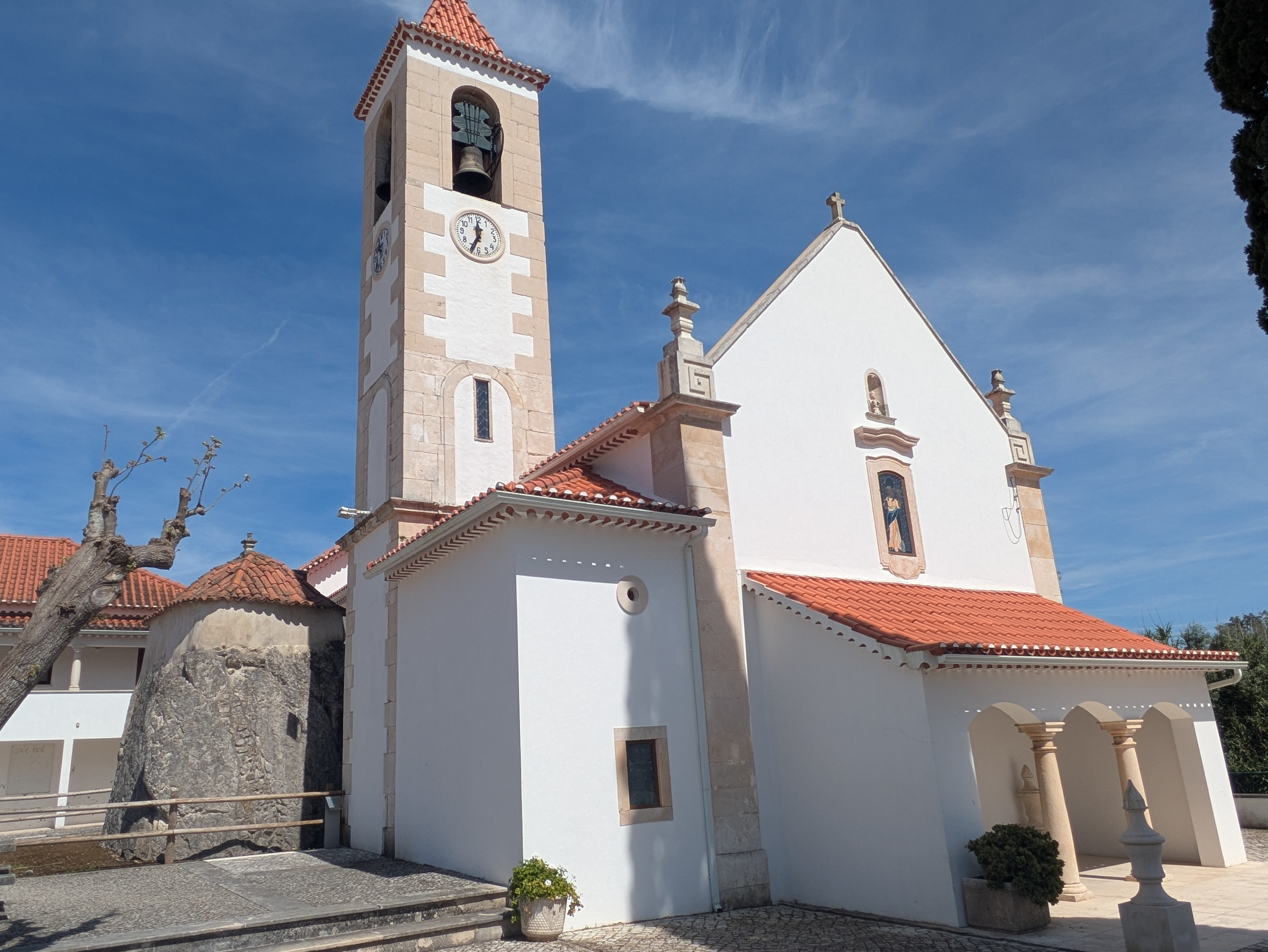
The dolmen-chapel to the left of the church

== Excavations ==
The first known excavations were in around 1889, when Portugal's Geological Services carried out an exploration and reconnaissance of the dolmen, without doing a methodical excavation. In 1936, excavations were carried out, led by Manuel Heleno. In 1982 the Department of Archaeology requested further excavation as a result of the danger of collapse of the chapel as a result of earthmoving work carried out on the site. This archaeological work was carried out in 1987. There is no information about artifacts that may have been found.

== Similar sites ==
There are several other Christainized dolmen in Portugal, including the Anta de Pavia and the Dolmen-Chapel of São Brissos, both in Évora District.
