= Arraiolos =

- Municipality
- Town of Arraiolos
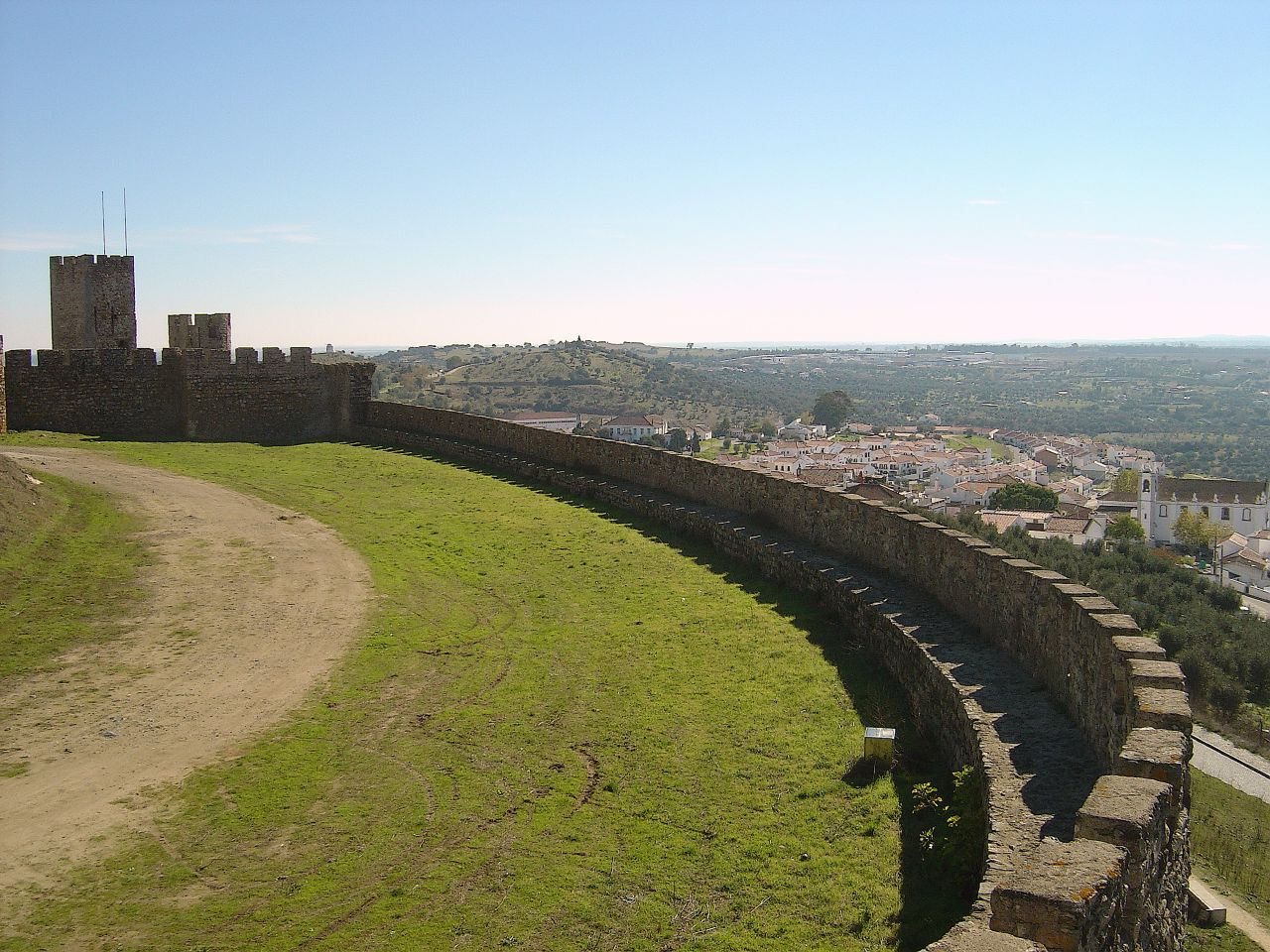
- Arraiolos seen from the castle

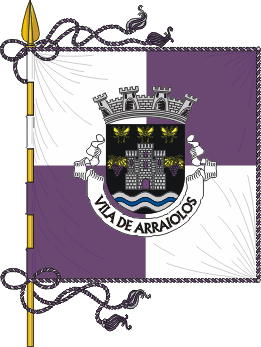
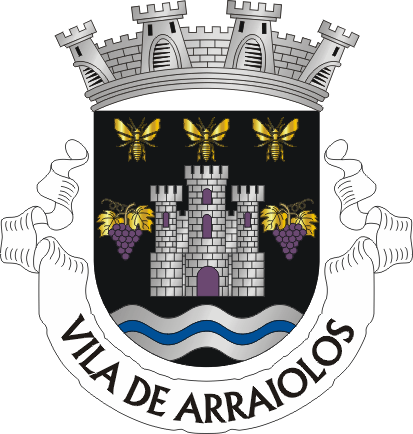
- Flag Coat of arms
- Interactive map of Arraiolos
- Location in Portugal
- Coordinates: 38°43′N 7°59′W
- Country: Portugal
- Region: Alentejo
- Intermunic. comm.: Alentejo Central
- District: Évora
- Parishes: 5

Government
  - President: Silvia Pinto (CDU)

Area
  - Total: 683.75 km^{2} (264.00 sq mi)

Population (2021)
  - Total: 6,606
  - Density: 9.661/km^{2} (25.02/sq mi)
- Time zone: UTC+00:00 (WET)
  - Summer (DST): UTC+01:00 (WEST)
- Local holiday: Ascension Day date varies
- Website: www.cm-arraiolos.pt

Arraiolos (pronounced [ɐʁɐˈjɔluʃ]), officially the Town of Arraiolos (Portuguese: Vila de Arraiolos), is a town seat of the Arraiolos Municipality in the Évora District of Portugal. As of 2021, the municipality had a population of 6,606 people and covered an area of 683.75 square kilometres (264.00 mi^{2}). The town itself was home to 3,133 residents in the same year. The current Mayor is Silvia Pinto, elected by the Unitary Democratic Coalition.

The town is famous for its castle and its embroidered wool rugs and carpets. Arraiolos rugs have been made since at least the 16th century.

In October 2003, Jorge Sampaio, the then President of Portugal, invited the Presidents of Finland, Germany, as well as of soon-to-be EU members Hungary, Latvia and Poland to Arraiolos in order to discuss the consequences of the 2004 enlargement of the European Union and plans for a Constitution for Europe. Subsequent meetings of non-executive presidents of European Union member states have been dubbed Arraiolos meetings.

== History ==
=== Origins and Roman era ===
Archaeological evidence suggests that the area around Arraiolos has been inhabited since at least the late Neolithic or Chalcolithic periods, indicating significant human occupation as early as the 4th millennium BCE. Historians believe that during protohistoric times, the site of the present-day Castle of Arraiolos served as a central habitat. Prehistoric objects were excavated from a tumulus in Arraiolos at the beginning of the twentieth century. These included a trapezoid-shaped plaque with geometric design and three pottery vessels. These are now housed in the British Museum with similar discoveries also reported in Vendas Novas.

A Roman settlement may have existed in the area around Arraiolos. Evidence suggests that the Church of Santana do Campo was constructed over the remains of a Roman temple, with remnants visible in the church structure and nearby constructions, including the southern cemetery wall. A Roman inscription was also found nearby at Herdade da Ravasqueira. This settlement is believed to have corresponded to a vicus, a small agricultural community that evolved from an indigenous site under Roman influence. Historians have suggested that this settlement may have been called "Calântica." Others trace its origins to Sabine, Tusculan, and Alban settlers who are believed to have arrived in the area before the Sertorian Wars, led by a figure named Rayeo. This name, "Rayeo," could be the root of "Rayolis," which eventually evolved into Arraiolos.

=== Middle Ages ===
During the Islamic period, Arabic sources offer few details on the region, aside from the growing importance of Évora from the 10th century onward. In 1165, the area around Arraiolos likely was reconquered by Gerald the Fearless during the reign of King Afonso Henriques.

In 1217, King Afonso II granted the land of Arraiolos to Soeiro, the Bishop of Évora. This land largely corresponded to today's municipality, with the exception of Vimieiro, which would be granted a charter (foral) in 1257 by bishop Martinho of Évora. However, under King Afonso III, both Arraiolos and Vimieiro would return to the hands of the crown, in 1271.

Arraiolos received its first charter from King Denis in 1290, who also commissioned the construction of the town's castle. On December 26, 1305, a contract for the castle's construction was formalized between the king and representatives of the town council, João Anes and Martim Fernandes.

The land remained under the control of the Portuguese crown for less than a century. King Pedro I granted it to Rodrigo Afonso de Sousa, the son of Afonso Dinis, who was the illegitimate son of King Afonso III. After Sousa's death, the land was given to Álvaro Pires de Castro, the brother of Inês de Castro and the title of count of Arraiolos was created.

Álvaro Pires de Castro's rule over Arraiolos was marked by conflict with the townspeople, primarily due to his lodging rights, which required locals to house and feed his large entourage whenever he visited. This burden sparked significant discontent, and the villagers petitioned King Ferdinand for relief. In response, a formal agreement was established that limited Álvaro Pires de Castro's demands: he could no longer requisition residents' homes or take their belongings, such as food and household items, without consent. As part of the compromise, the townspeople agreed to contribute labor toward the construction of a new residence for him in exchange for clear limits on his demands.

In 1387, Nuno Álvares Pereira, Constable of Portugal, became the second count of Arraiolos. He spent a significant period in Arraiolos before eventually joining the Carmo Convent in Lisbon. In 1422, he transferred the title to his grandson, Fernando, who would later become the second Duke of Braganza, establishing the title firmly within the House of Braganza.

=== Modern era ===
The town's charter was renewed on 29 March 1511 by King Manuel I. It was part of a reform initiated in 1496 to modernize and correct issues in older medieval charters granted to Portuguese towns and cities. This reform aimed to curb abuses by local lords, who had imposed unauthorized taxes and exploited the population, especially in towns held by noble patrons, as was the case with Arraiolos under Álvaro Pires de Castro. By issuing a revised foral, the crown sought to reaffirm its authority, protect the rights and privileges of towns, and regulate relationships within the community to ensure fair governance.

The first population count in Arraiolos took place between 1527 and 1532, following a census by King John III. The entire land of Arraiolos comprised 760 households, which corresponds to approximately 3,500 people. No separate figures exist for just the town. This placed Arraiolos among the 17 most populous urban centers in Alentejo at the time.

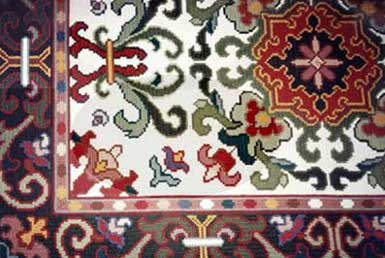
A corner of an Arraiolos rug

The production of Arraiolos carpets dates back to at least the 16th century and is closely linked to the influence of Islamic weavers who brought their weaving traditions to Portugal between the 8th and 15th centuries. After the expulsion of non-Catholics under King Manuel I in the early 16th century, many Muslim artisans are assumed to have migrated to the south of Portugal, particularly to the Alentejo region. These skilled weavers would have helped introduce and preserve carpet-making techniques, which merged with local traditions to create the distinctive Arraiolos style. By the late 17th century, records of Arraiolos carpets appear in customs documentation from Lisbon, indicating their growing popularity and spread. However, by the 19th century, the production of Arraiolos rugs began to decline as industrialization and the proliferation of machine-made textiles increasingly displaced the traditional craft.

Arraiolos experienced several administrative changes over the centuries. Its boundaries were first formally defined in 1736. In 1835, it was incorporated into the Évora District and in 1855 Arraiolos annexed the Vimieiro municipality. Mora municipality was annexed in 1895 but separated again in 1898.

On 21 April 1907, the Ramal de Mora railway line reached Arraiolos connecting it to Évora to the south. A year later, the line was completed, reaching the neighboring town of Mora to the north. The Arraiolos station was located 2 kilometres (1.2 mi) to the east of the center, without any buildings nearby. Another station existed in the municipality to the north in Vale de Paio. Operations on this line ceased in May 1987 and in 2006, part of the line's former path was converted into a dedicated trail for cyclists and pedestrians.

== Parishes ==
Administratively, the municipality is divided into 5 civil parishes (freguesias):

- Arraiolos
- Gafanhoeira e Sabugueiro
- Igrejinha
- São Gregório e Santa Justa
- Vimieiro

== Transports ==
Arraiolos is connected to other locations in Alentejo by bus services provided by Rodoviária do Alentejo (a part of Barraqueiro Group) and Rede Expressos. In the town center there are also a bus station for touristic busses and a taxi rank.

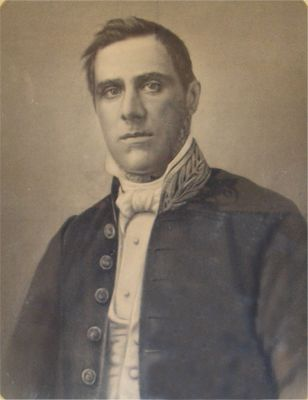
Joaquim Rivara (1809-1879)

The municipality has a bike and walking path passing 2 kilometres (1.2 mi) east of the town of Arraiolos. It follows the path of the decommissioned railway line Ramal de Mora and it connects the town of Arraiolos to Vale de Paio to the north and Évora to the south. It is a part of the Grande Rota do Montado project that hopes to convert to bike and walking paths parts of the decommissioned railways around Évora (Ramal de Reguengos, Ramal de Vila Viçosa, Ramal de Montemor, Ramal de Mora and Linha de Évora. A total of 1,100 kilometres (680 mi) of paths are expected to be converted across Alentejo.

== Notable people ==
- Joaquim Heliodoro da Cunha Rivara (1809 in Arraiolos – 1879 in Évora) a physician, professor, intellectual and politician
- Francisco José Caeiro (1890 in Vimieiro – 1976) a politician and former Minister and law professor.
- José Caeiro da Mata (1883 in Vimieiro – 1963) jurist, law professor and former Minister of Foreign Affairs.

== Gallery ==
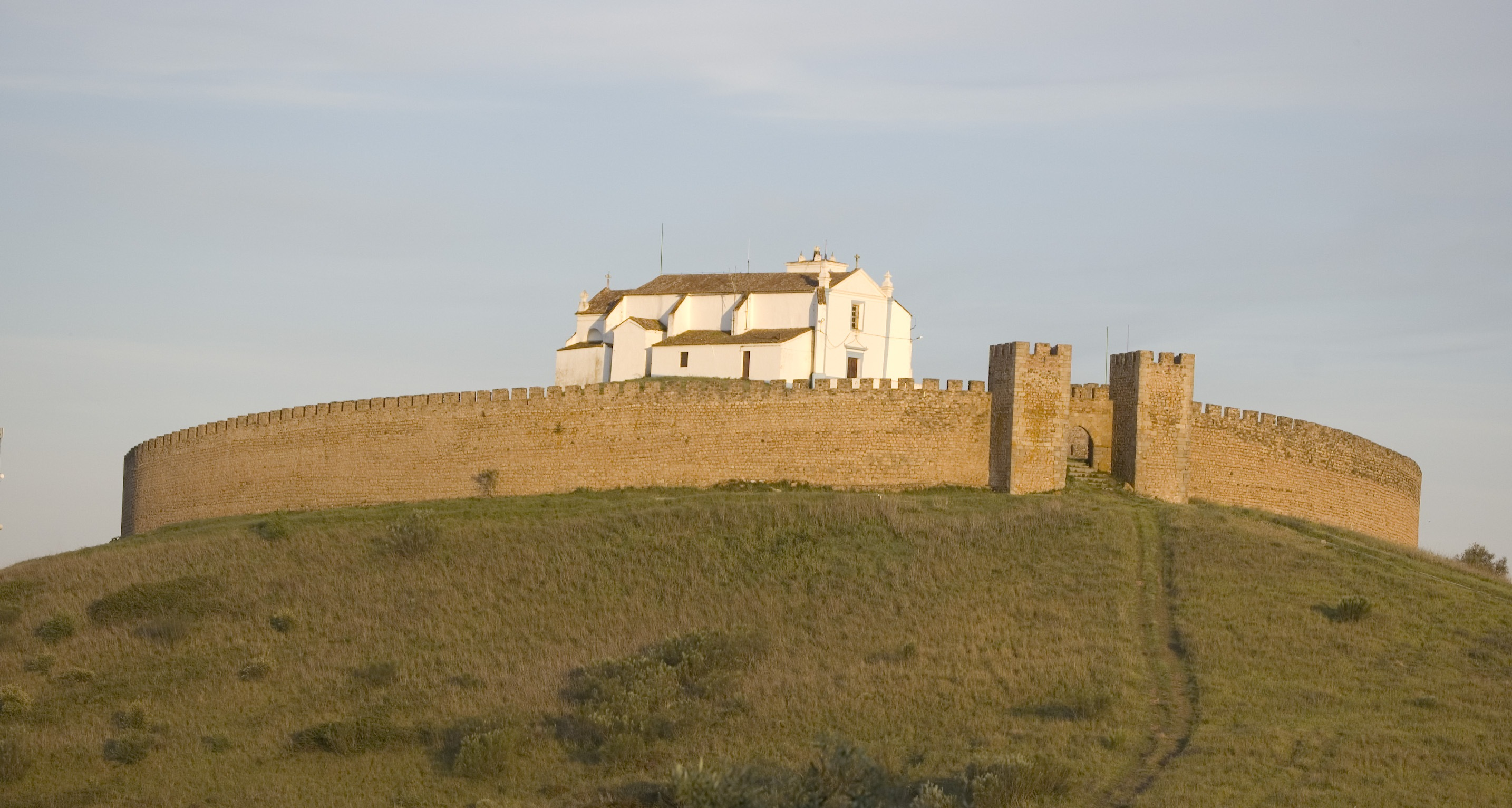
The local castle.

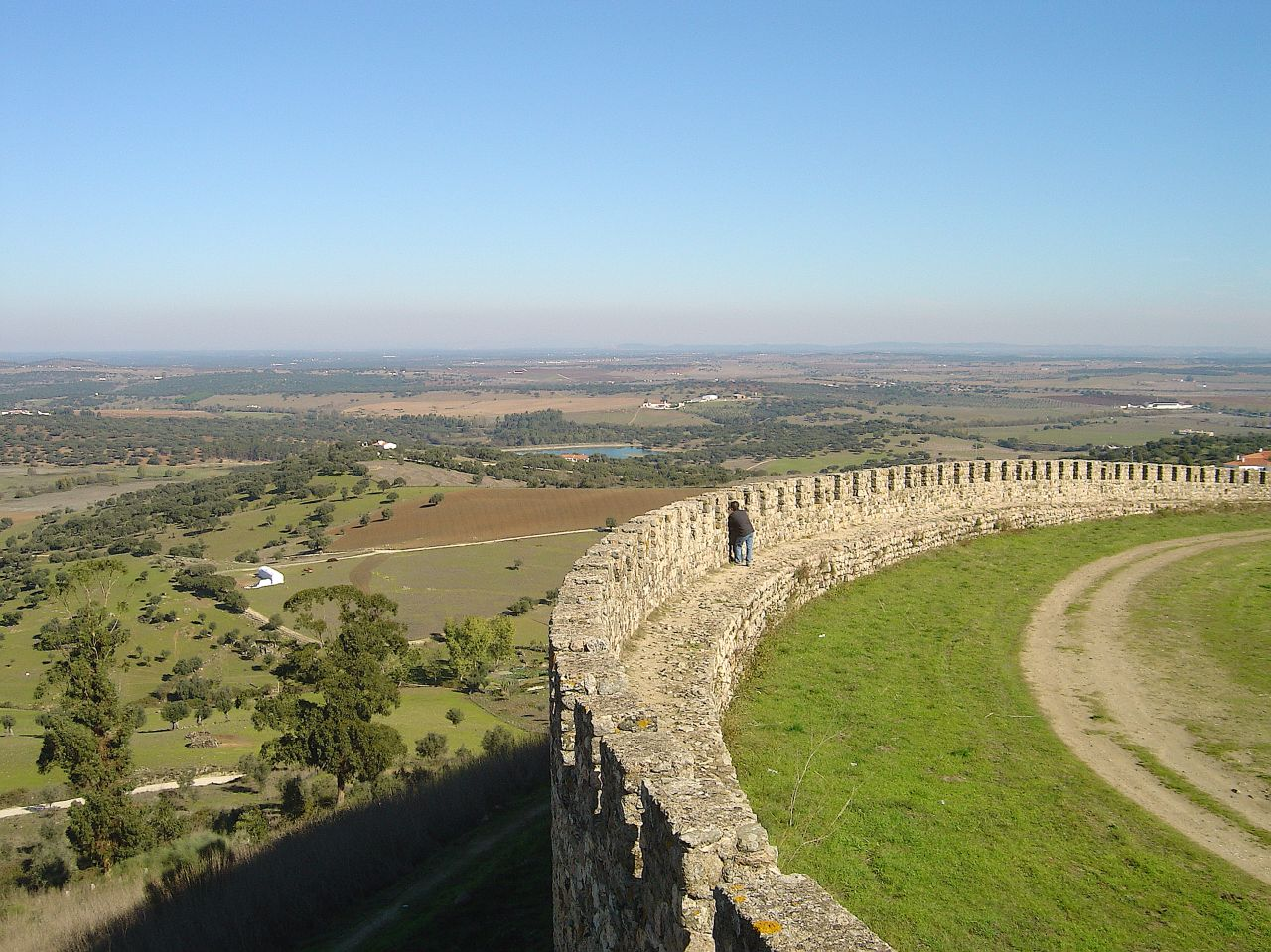
View of the countryside from the castle.

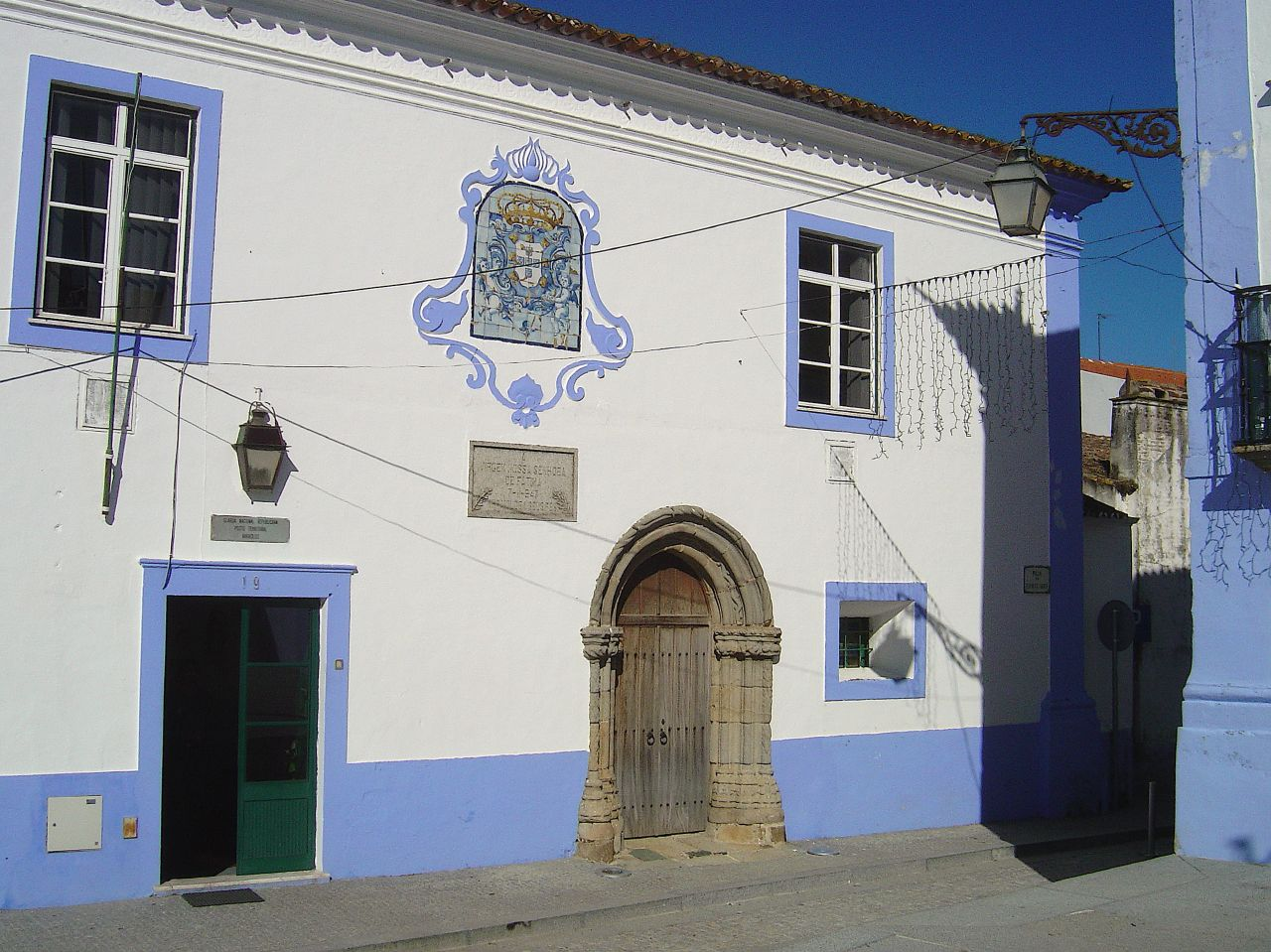
A house in Arraiolos.

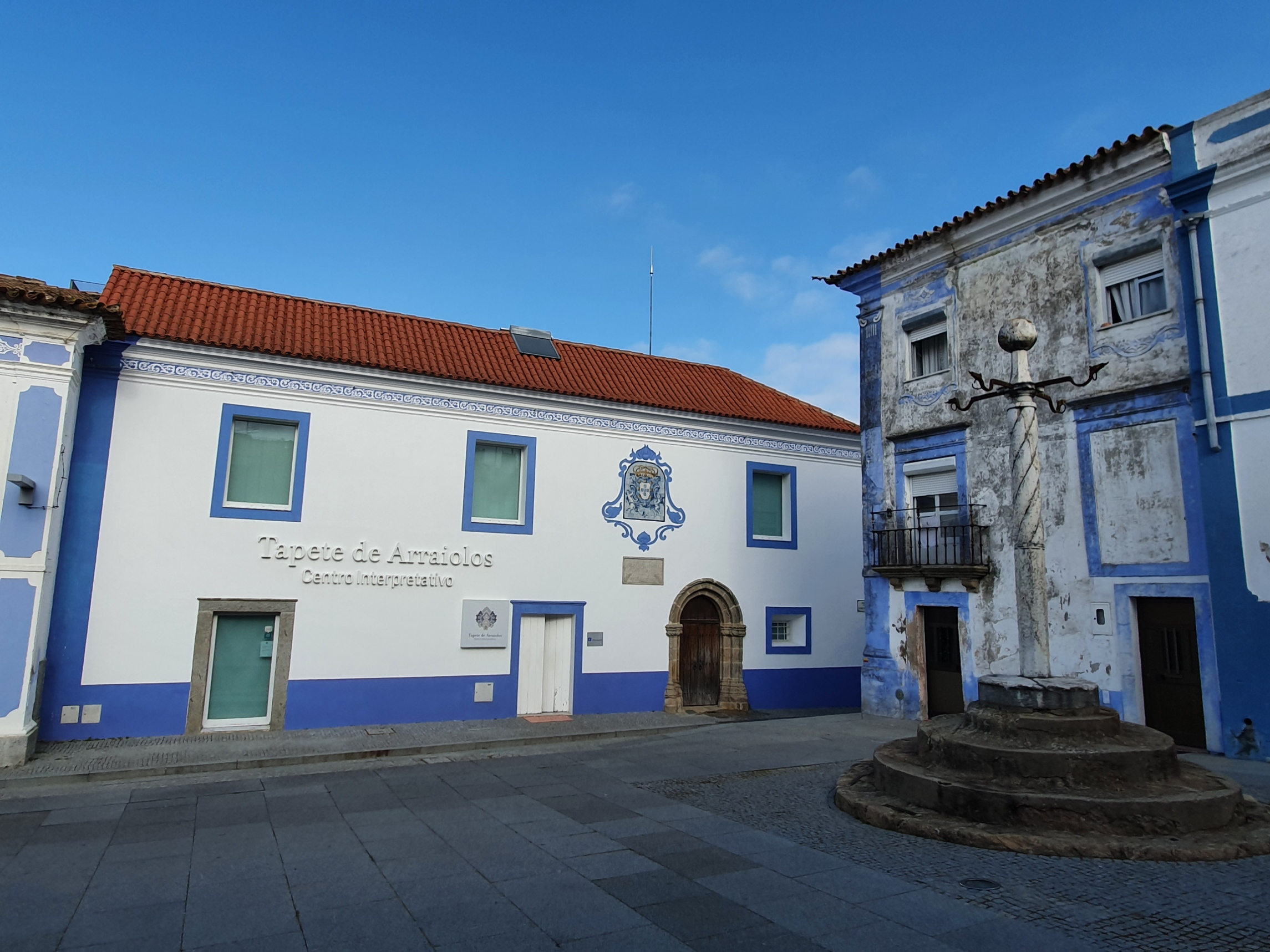
Interpretative center for Arraiolos rugs

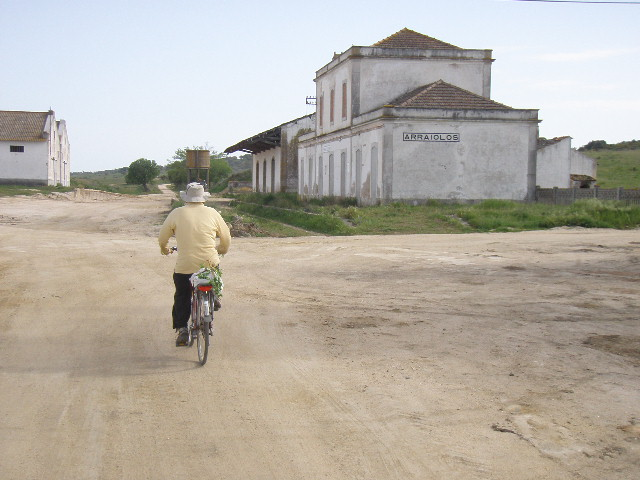
Arraiolos train station, after railway decommission
