= Mora Municipality =

Mora Municipality may refer to the following places:

- Mora, New Mexico, a town in northern part of the state
- Mora Municipality, Portugal, district of Évora
- Mora, Spain, province of Toledo, autonomous community of Castile-La Mancha
- Mora Municipality, Sweden, county of Dalarna
