= Arraiolos rug =

Type of Portuguese rug

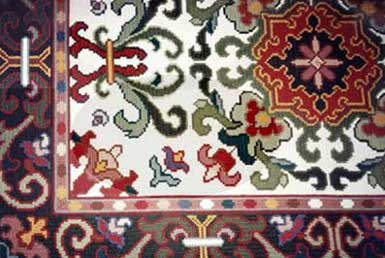
Detail of the corner of an Arraiolos rug.

An Arraiolos rug, Arraiolos tapestry, Arraiolos carpet or Portuguese needlework rug (in Portuguese, Tapete de Arraiolos) is a traditionally embroidered wool rug made in the town of Arraiolos, Portugal, dating back to at least the 16th century. They are partly inspired by Persian carpets, though there are notable differences in their construction and design.

Unlike Persian and Turkish rugs, which are woven on looms using knots (asymmetric in Persian rugs and symmetric in Turkish ones), Arraiolos rugs are embroidered using a diagonal cross-stitch technique known as ponto de Arraiolos. This technique is easier to execute than knotting, making it more accessible for local artisans. Despite the difference in construction, the decorative patterns of Arraiolos rugs are closely aligned with those of Persian carpets, with similar motifs and symmetry, influenced by Islamic art. The patterns and structure of the rugs evolved over time, incorporating influences from European textile arts, including Baroque and Rococo styles during the 17th and 18th centuries.

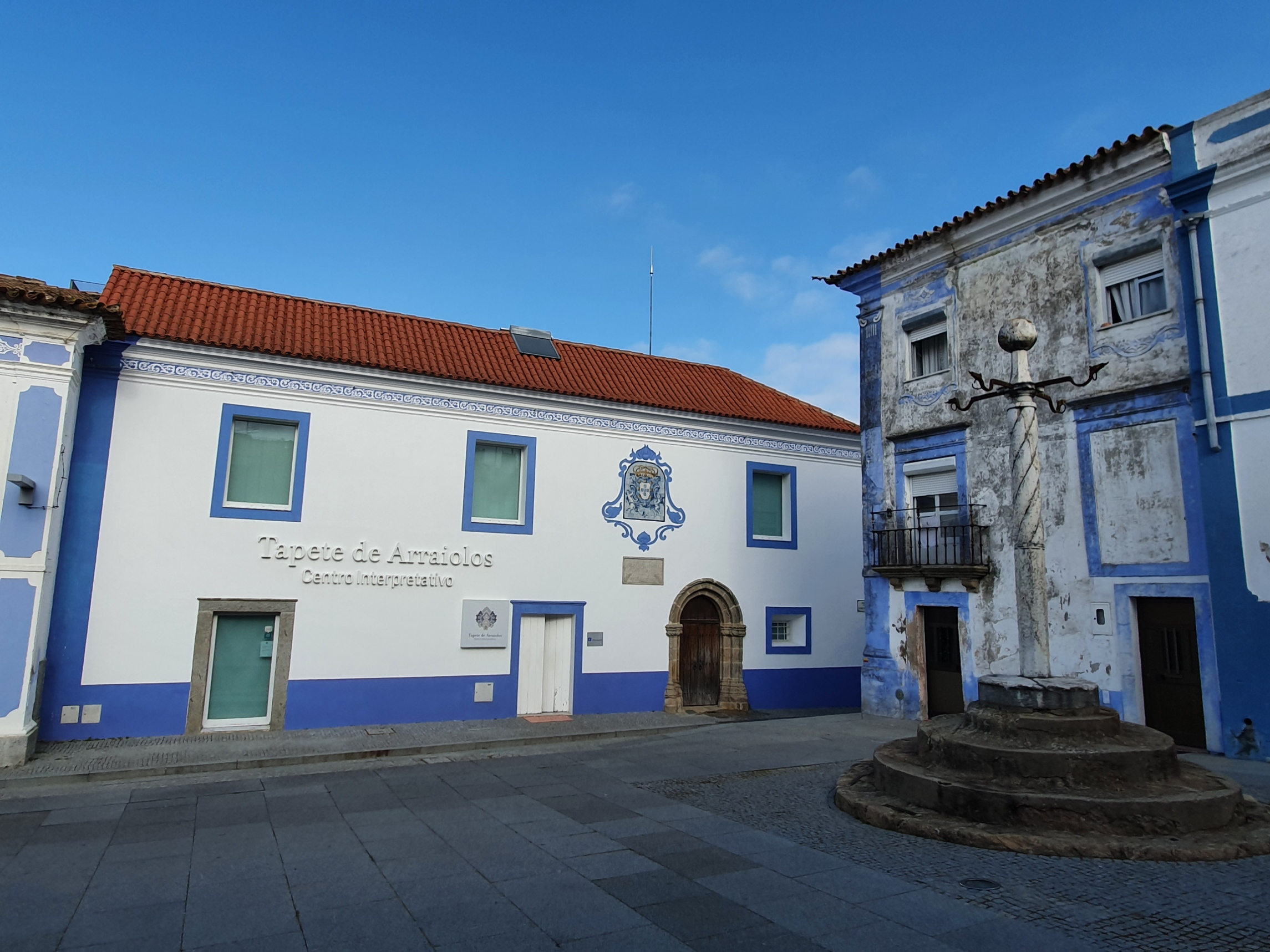
Interpretative center for Arraiolos rugs in Arraiolos

The earliest written references to Arraiolos rugs date back to the late 16th century, with a mention of a "tapete da terra" (local rug) in an inventory of goods. By the late 17th century, there is documented evidence of Arraiolos rugs being traded in Lisbon. However, by the 19th century, the production of Arraiolos rugs began to decline, as the traditional craft was increasingly overshadowed by industrialization and the rise of machine-made textiles.

The production of Arraiolos rugs is thought to have begun due to a combination of local factors: the availability of materials, the presence of weaving workshops, and a strong tradition of textile crafts in the region. The influence of Islamic weavers, who lived in Portugal from the 8th to the 15th centuries, is also significant. A migration and settlement of these people in Arraiolos and Alentejo is believed to have occurred during the 15th century, following a royal edict to expel non-Christians issued by King Manuel I of Portugal in 1496. It is believed that these weavers introduced rug-making techniques to the people of Arraiolos, who adapted them into their own distinct style.

== References and sources ==
Sources

- BAPTISTA DE OLIVEIRA, Fernando. 1992 "Tapeçarias Decorativas de Arraiolos".
