= António da Mota Veiga =

António Jorge Martins da Mota Veiga (Cascais, 28 February 1915 – Lisbon, CUF Hospital, 14 November 2005) was a Portuguese politician and former Minister and law professor.

== Background ==
He was the son of Elisário Eduardo da Mota Veiga (Lisbon, Anjos, 6 March 1887/Seia, Seia, 6 April 1887 – Lisbon, 5 October 1966), a Licentiate in Law from the Faculty of Law of the University of Coimbra and a lawyer, and wife Antónia Martins (Celorico da Beira, São Pedro, 29 July 1884 – Lisbon, 10 April 1980); paternal grandson of Amândio Eduardo da Mota Veiga (Seia, Seia, 25 February 1846 – Lisbon, 18 February 1921), also a lawyer from the same Faculty and University, from an old Family of his region, and wife Ana Augusta da Assunção, and maternal grandson of Francisco Nunes and wife Maria Cândida Martins.

== Career ==
He was a Licentiate, Doctorate and a Cathedratic Professor from the Faculty of Law of the University of Lisbon.

He started his career as a lawyer.

He was Secretary of State, Minister, Judge Counselor of the Portuguese Supreme Court of Justice, Administrator of the Caixa Geral de Depósitos and Professor and Rector of the Lusíada University.

== Decorations ==
He was a Knight of the Order of the Holy Sepulchre.

== Family ==
He married in Lisbon at the Patriarchal Chapel on 7 December 1946, to Maria Emília da Gama Caeiro (Lisbon, São Sebastião da Pedreira, 13 April 1923), daughter of Francisco José Caeiro and wife Deolinda de Sousa de Lima Ferreira da Gama; they had five children:

- Maria Eugénia Caeiro da Mota Veiga (b. 6 November 1947), married to António Pedro de Gouveia Themudo de Castro (b. 20 June 1945), son of Vicente Themudo de Castro (Lisbon, 1903 – Constância, 1955) and wife Maria Luísa Folque Pereira de Gouveia (Ferreira do Zêzere, Ferreira do Zêzere, 19 September 1912 –), of remote Catalan descent, and had issue, three sons:
  - Vicente da Mota Veiga Themudo de Castro (b. Lisbon, São Sebastião da Pedreira, 11 December 1972), married in Estoril, Santo António do Estoril, 18 June 2005 to Rita Oram de Menezes Soares (b. Lisbon, Alvalade, 27 June 1977, an Artist, daughter of António Carlos Merckx de Menezes Soares (b. Beja) and Rita Maria Montez Oram Soares (b. Sintra)), and had issue, one son:
    - Pedro de Menezes Soares Themudo de Castro (b. Lisbon, São Domingos de Benfica, 23 July 2007)
  - Ricardo da Mota Veiga Themudo de Castro
  - Francisco da Mota Veiga Themudo de Castro
- Ana Cristina da Gama Caeiro da Mota Veiga (b. Lisbon, Santos o Velho, 4 June 1950), married firstly in Évora, São Miguel de Machede, on 27 July 1972 and later divorced Marcelo Nuno Duarte Rebelo de Sousa (born Lisbon, São Sebastião da Pedreira, 12 December 1948), and had issue, two children, and married secondly to Jorge Manuel Vassalo Sors Lagrifa (7 May 1948 – 6 February 2005), son of António Faias Sors Lagrifa (b. Luanda) and wife Maria da Luz Pereira Monteiro Vassalo e Silva, and maternal grandson of Manuel António Vassalo e Silva and wife Fernanda Pereira e Silva Monteiro, without issue
- António José Caeiro da Mota Veiga (b. Lisbon, 8 June 1951), married in Sintra on 31 October 1974 to Maria José Trigueiros de Aragão Acciaioli de Avilez (b. Lisbon, Santa Maria de Belém, 21 June 1954), youngest of the three daughters of José Maria de Avilez Juzarte de Sousa Tavares (Lisbon, 14 August 1926 –), 7th Count of Avilez, Representative of the Viscount of Torre do Terrenho, of the Viscounts of Reguengo, and wife (m. Castelo Branco, Alcains, 28 September 1947) Ana Maria de Portugal Lobo Trigueiros de Aragão (Fundão, Aldeia de Joanes, 16 August 1923 –), of the Counts of Idanha-a-Nova and Viscounts of Outeiro, and had issue, four children:
  - Marta Acciaioli de Avilez da Mota Veiga (b. Lisbon, Santa Maria de Belém, 15 February 1976), married firstly in Muge, Salvaterra, on 31 October 1998 and later divorced to João Manuel da Silva Barran de Assis Cabeleira (b. Amadora, 10 July 1973), an Economist, son of Vítor Manuel de Assis Cabeleira and wife Pilar da Silva Barran, of french people descent, and had issue, two daughters and one son
  - Maria Madalena Acciaioli de Avillez da Mota Veiga (Lisbon, Santa Maria de Belém, 2 March 1979)
  - Filipa Acciaioli de Avillez da Mota Veiga (b. 6 October 1986), has a daughter by Rui Sebastião Neves Madaleno, a Lawyer, son of Luís Carlos Pereira Madaleno and wife Maria Onélia Vicente Neves
  - António Maria Acciaioli de Avillez da Mota Veiga (b. 9 April 1990)
- Francisco José Caeiro da Mota Veiga (b. 5 July 1955), married firstly as her first husband and divorced to Maria da Graça dos Santos Dias da Silva (Lisbon, São Sebastião da Pedreira, 8 July 1954), daughter of Carlos Calderón Dias da Silva (Lisbon, São Jorge de Arroios, 6 December 1925 – Lisbon, São João de Deus, 1 January 1980), of Spanish descent, and wife Maria Helena Pinto Rodrigues dos Santos (Caldas da Rainha, Nossa Senhora do Pópulo, 13 October 1926 –), without issue, married secondly to Italian Constanza Rochetti, without issue, and married thirdly in Nelas, Canas de Senhorim, on 7 September 2002 to Maria da Conceição Alves Amaral, and had issue, one daughter:
  - Leonor Amaral da Mota Veiga (b. Lisbon, 22 August 2006)
- Manuel Eduardo Caeiro da Mota Veiga (b. Lisbon, 19 March 1965), married on 11 December 1993 to Dona Júlia de Castilho dos Santos Silva de Castro (b. Lisbon, 16 April 1961), daughter of Dom Fernão Gil de Castro (Lisbon, 20 October 1910 – 13 August 1973), son of the 2nd Count of Nova Goa, of remote Catalan and Italian descent, and wife (m. Lisbon, 7 February 1955) Maria Adelaide de Castilho dos Santos Silva (18 May 1929 –), of the Barons of Santos and the Barons of Ferreira dos Santos, of remote French and English descent (great-niece of Américo Cardinal Ferreira dos Santos Silva, great-great-niece of António Feliciano de Castilho and three times a distant relative of José Bonifácio de Andrada e Silva), and had issue, two children:
  - Lourenço de Castro da Mota Veiga (b. 16 November 1994)
  - Mariana de Castro da Mota Veiga (b. 29 April 1998)
