= Escoural Cave =

Cave and archaeological site in Portugal

- Prehistoric Rock-Art Site of Escoural Cave
- Interactive map of Escoural Cave
- Location: Santiago do Escoural, Alentejo, Portugal
- Coordinates: 38°32′37.05″N 8°8′14.99″W
- Discovery: 1963

The Prehistoric Rock-Art Site of Escoural Cave (Portuguese: Estação Arqueológica da Herdade da Sala/Gruta do Escoural) is a structure known for its Paleolithic-era rock-art and funerary burial site, located in the Portuguese municipality of Montemor-o-Novo, in the civil parish of Santiago do Escoural.

== History ==
The earliest vestiges of human occupation date back to 50,000 years B.C. (pertaining to the Middle Paleolithic), associated with the interior of the cave. The first occupants of the cave came from groups of Neanderthal hunter-gatherers, who used the cave as a temporary shelter in order to hunt. Based on bone evidence within the cave, these groups hunted nearby aurochs, deer and horse. Elements of rock art also pertain to the Upper Paleolithic (40,000 to 10,000 years B.C.) or final parts of the Neolithic period, when the interior was used as a funerary site, while a small settlement inhabited the area in the exterior. During the Chalcolithic period, a human settlement existed within the cave, developing into a fortified site by the end of Copper Age.

A series of archaeological investigations began in 1963, under Manuel Farinha dos Santos, which continued in 1980, while a team of international investigators performed soundings in 1989. In 1999 it was included in the Programa de Valorização e Divulgação Turística: Itinerários Arqueológicos do Alentejo e Algarve, under the Ministry of Commerce and Tourism and Secretary-of-State of Culture, in order to monetize the sight as a tourist pole. As a result, an interpretative centre was constructed from a local traditional building, then expanded, reopened in 2011 after new public works.

== Architecture ==
Entrance to the cave

The rock-art site is located along the E.N.370 motorway between Santiago do Escoural and Alto da Abaneja, approximately five kilometres from the latter. A side road towards the east, in the direction of Herdade da Sala, in the locality of Fonte Nova, directs the traveller to a marble outcropping and cliff face embedded in igneous rock, on which the archaeological site is found. It is in an isolated rural location between the Tagus River and Sado River basins and the plains region of the Alentejo, near other important megalithic monuments, including the Cromolech of Almendres and the dolmen Anta Grande do Zambujeiro.

A complex subterranean structure, the cave is an irregular plan that extends longitudinally northwest to southeast, consisting of a network of horizontal halls and galleries at different levels sealed within a thick flowstone mantle. Although the excavation and investigation of the cave has been studied since the 1960s, prospecting in the cave has yet to be concluded. The cave, which develops in a very tangled and karst network with multiple connections to the outside, is located within a steep cliff of hard limestone.

The latest surveys, made in 1989 (Silva and others, 1991), have revealed new chambers, resulting in further progressive investigations. Beyond the important cave art, paintings and engravings, the underground system has revealed numerous funerary burial sites dating from the Neolithic to the Chalcolithic, with a universe of interesting artifacts. Outdoors, in an area defined by the extent of the cliff face, there were recorded traces of a village that existed throughout the Neolithic to the Chalcolithic.

The monument is a singular example of Neolithic Portuguese archaeology, whose prehistoric art paintings are comparable to those of Altamira and Lascaux. The site was the first in Portugal in which prehistoric art was identified, and the only location that has examples of Paleolithic artwork. There have been identified hundreds of motifs, engravings and paintings of animals, abstract forms and geometric shapes in the archaeological site.

== See also ==
- Furninha
