= Anta de Pavia =

Dolmen in Évora District, Portugal

- Anta-Capela de São Dinis
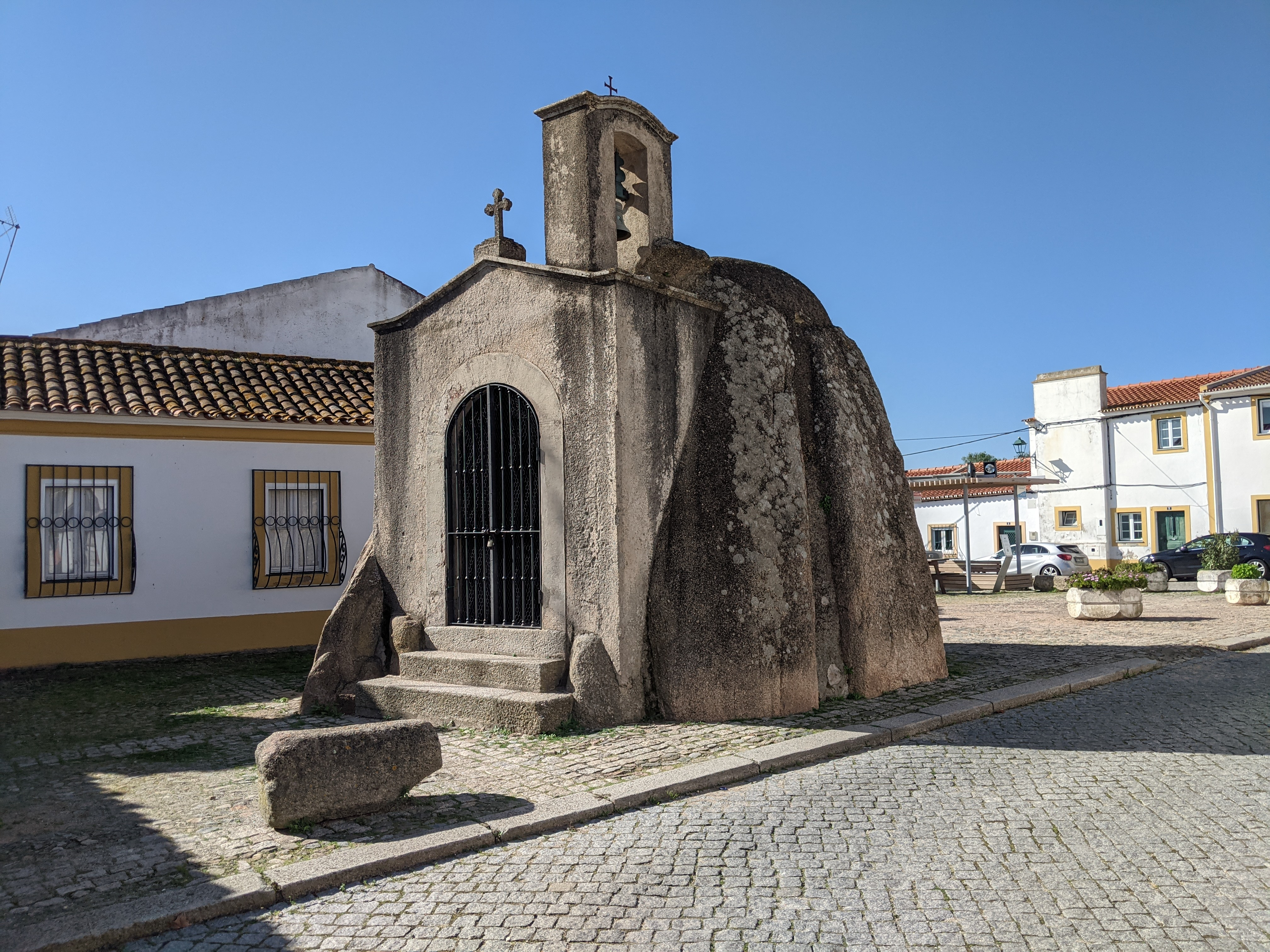
- Interactive map of Anta de Pavia
- 39°53′39″N 8°01′02″W
- Type: Dolmen
- Periods: Late Neolithic; Early Chalcolithic
- Location: Pavia, Mora, Évora District, Portugal

History
- Built: c. 3000 BCE

Site notes
- Height: 3.3 m (11 ft)
- Diameter: 4.3 m (14 ft)
- Excavation dates: 1914–15; 2013
- Condition: Good. Converted into a Christian chapel
- Public access: Yes

The Anta de Pavia, also known as the Anta-Capela de São Dinis, is a large megalithic tomb, or dolmen, in the village of Pavia in the municipality of Mora in the Évora District of Portugal. Located in the centre of the village, it is a unique case of a dolmen now situated in a fully urban context. In the early 17th-century the tomb was consecrated and converted into a small chapel. It has been designated as a National Monument since 23 June 1910.

== Description ==
The dolmen is in the main square of Pavia, surrounded by a pavement and roads. The polygonal oval burial chamber of the dolmen has a maximum outer diameter of 4.3 metres and a height of 3.3 metres. It consists of seven in situ upright stones, with a single covering capstone, which measures 3.0 × 2.6 metres. It was originally constructed between the 4th and 3rd millennia BC, placing it in the Late-Neolithic or Neo-Chalcolithic periods. It would originally have had an entrance corridor but that is now missing.

With its conversion into the Chapel of Saint Dinis it became, and remains, the largest reconstruction of a megalithic structure on the Iberian Peninsula. The first written reference to it is from 1625. The dolmen's chamber serves as the apse of the chapel, with the 17th-century addition forming a small nave with a length of just one metre. It has a triangular façade and there are three steps at the entrance. The altar is decorated with azulejo tiles. A bell tower and a cross were also added. This is not the only dolmen that has been Christianized in Portugal. Other examples include the Dolmen-Chapel of São Brissos at Santiago do Escoural and the Anta-Capela de Alcobertas in the Santarém District.

== Excavations ==
The dolmen was the subject of archaeological excavations in 1914–15, led by Virgílio Correia. These revealed that the chamber had been divided into sections by vertical slabs. In one of these sections, an ornate slate idol was found. Fragments of vessels, stone axes, and schist plaques were also revealed. Further excavations were carried out in 2013, under the supervision of Leonor Rocha from the University of Évora, with the intention of verifying that there had been an entrance corridor for the burial chamber (which was confirmed) and providing a more precise dating. Several niches made of granite slabs were also discovered, which would have served as individual tombs or for secondary burials.

Artifacts found at the site are held by the National Museum of Archaeology, Lisbon.
