= Francisco José Caeiro =

Francisco José Caeiro (Arraiolos, Vimieiro, 6 March 1890 – Lisbon, 24 May 1976) was a Portuguese politician and former Minister and law professor.

== Background ==
He was the son of Faustino José Caeiro and wife Emília Augusta da Conceição, both born and married in Arraiolos, Vimieiro; paternal grandson of Francisco José Caeiro and wife Rosa Maria, and maternal grandson of Manuel da Rosa de Brito and wife Emília da Conceição.

== Career ==
He was a Licentiate and a Cathedratic Professor of Law from the Faculty of Law of the University of Coimbra.

He started his career as a lawyer.

He was Counselor, Minister and the 4th Attorney-General of the Republic.

He was the Proprietor of the Palace of the Farm in Azaruja.

== Family ==
He married in Lisbon on 11 June 1921 to Deolinda de Sousa de Lima Ferreira da Gama (Vila do Conde, São Simão da Junqueira, 8 August 1895 –), daughter of Aníbal Ferreira da Gama, born in Vale de Espinhal, and wife Deolinda de Sousa de Lima; they had issue, three children:

- Maria Emília da Gama Caeiro (Lisbon, São Sebastião da Pedreira, 13 April 1923 –), married in Lisbon at the Patriarchal Chapel on 7 December 1946 to António Jorge Martins da Mota Veiga (Cascais, 28 February 1915 –), by whom she had issue, five children
- Francisco José da Gama Caeiro (Lisbon, 26 May 1928 – Lisbon, 18 September 1994), a writer, married in Portalegre on 2 October 1954 to Dona Maria Madalena de São Paio e Albuquerque de Mendoça Furtado, 8th Countess of São Paio (Lisbon, 6 September 1928 –), daughter of Dom António Pedro Maria da Luz de São Paio Melo e Castro Moniz Torres e Lusignan, 7th Count and 3rd Marquess of São Paio (Porto, 24 July 1902 – Lisbon, 5 June 1981), one of the main Portuguese Genealogists of the 20th century, and wife (m. Lisbon, 8 July 1926) Maria do Carmo de Sárrea Caldeira Castel-Branco (Portalegre, Sé, 19 December 1906 –), without issue
- Aníbal da Gama Caeiro (Lisbon, 1 July 1925 –), a medical doctor, married to Ana Maria Vila-Moura da Fonseca Rocheta (Lisbon, 14 May 1933 –), and had issue, three children:
  - José Miguel da Fonseca Rocheta Caeiro (b. Lisbon, 25 July 1954), married to Maria da Conceição de Azeredo Pinto de Melo e Leme (b. Lisbon, 25 July 1954), daughter of Carlos Nuno de Azeredo Pinto Melo e Leme (14 August 1920 –) and wife Maria do Carmo de Azeredo da Silveira de Sampaio e Melo e Lemos (Casa do Cabo, 28 February 1921 – Amarante, 19 July 2001), daughter of the 3rd Count (formerly Viscounts and Barons) of Leiria, and had issue, three children:
    - Maria Inês Vila-Moura de Azeredo Caeiro
    - Marta Vila-Moura de Azeredo Caeiro
    - Francisco Miguel Vila-Moura de Azeredo Caeiro
  - Ana Isabel da Fonseca Rocheta Caeiro (b. Lisbon, 13 August 1955), married to Francisco Paulo de Lima Nave Catalão, son of Manuel Vaz Nave Catalão (b. Covilhã), an Engineer, and wife Maria de Lourdes de Castro Lima (b. Coimbra), and had issue, two children
  - Maria do Rosário da Fonseca Rocheta Caeiro (b. Lisbon, 27 February 1958), married to Pedro Inácio Pegado de Lemos de Mendonça (b. Lisbon, 30 May 1953), son of Camilo António de Almeida da Gama de Lemos de Mendonça (Alfândega da Fé, Vilarelhos, 23 July 1921 – 5 April 1984), of the Barons of Barcel, and wife (m. Macedo de Cavaleiros, Macedo de Cavaleiros, Casa de Travanca, 8 November 1947) Ana Maria Angélica de Meneses Barroso de Moura Pegado (Macedo de Cavaleiros, Macedo de Cavaleiros, Casa de Travanca, 24 August 1921 –), and had issue, three children
