= Cabeção =

- Civil parish
- Location in Portugal
- Coordinates: 38.952°N 8.072°W
- Country: Portugal
- Region: Alentejo
- Intermunic. comm.: Alentejo Central
- District: Évora
- Municipality: Mora

Area
  - Total: 47.43 km^{2} (18.31 sq mi)

Population (2011)
  - Total: 1,073
  - Density: 23/km^{2} (59/sq mi)
- Time zone: UTC+00:00 (WET)
  - Summer (DST): UTC+01:00 (WEST)

Cabeção is a Portuguese village, located in Mora Municipality in the Alto Alentejo Subregion. The population in 2011 was 1,073, in an area of 47.43 km². For a time it was the seat of local government in the immediate area between 1395 e 1836.

The village is surrounded on the three sides by woodland, much of which is made up by a celebrated forest of pine trees known locally as the "pinhal": part of the national forest of Portugal. Dense plantations of pine trees lie to the East and the West of the village on higher ground. Linking these is an area of mixed woodland consisting of Cork Oaks, Holm Oaks and vineyards. This area is also on higher ground.

The southern flank of the village is marked by the river Raia, beyond which is open pasture and a line of hills that make up the southern side of the river valley. Some 60 metres or so wide, the river hosts international Sport fishing events along its banks at Cabeção, attracting teams from across Europe. A little further downstream and approximately 2 km from the centre of the village lies the Gameiro Ecological Park: a wider expanse of water where it's possible to enjoy a number of outdoor activities including camping and canoeing.

Integrated into this park is Mora Fluviarium: a building of recognised architectural significance and home to an impressive collection of freshwater aquatic species. Mora Fluviarium is well known within Portugal and continues to attract visitors to Cabeção from Portugal and Spain. The centre also enjoys academic and technical links with Lisbon Oceanarium and the University of Évora and is of significant importance to regional tourism, the ecology of the region and the local economy, particularly to that of the nearby village of Cabeção.

== Municipal Holiday ==
Cabeção's municipal holiday coincides with a national holiday on 1 November of each year.

== History ==
Cabeção was founded by the "Ordem de Avis" and was elevated to the status of "Vila" (or town) in 1578 by King D. Sebastião, the King of Portugal at that time. The King granted the people of Cabeção the right to exploit the natural resources of the pine forest that borders the village, a right that is exercised to this day by villagers collecting pine cones for use as fire lighters and wild asparagus for use in the well-known regional dish known as "Migas de Espargos".

During the late twentieth century the village, like many in rural Portugal, has suffered a decline in population as its inhabitants have moved to the coastal cities to find employment. Others have found work further afield in other European countries such as France. More recently many have found work in the United Kingdom, particularly in the Epsom area. It's not unusual to hear a native of the village speaking English with an accent typical of England's Home Counties. During the summer holidays, many former villagers who are now based elsewhere in Europe return to their Portuguese roots, swelling the population considerably.

== Heritage ==
- Pillory of Cabeção
- Torrinha do Castelo (Chapel) Photos
- Fluviarium
- Gameiro Ecological Park
- Dolmens: Monte da Ordem Photos
- Monte da Gonçala Chapel Photos
- Watermills: Duque, Arieireira, Madeira, Catarino

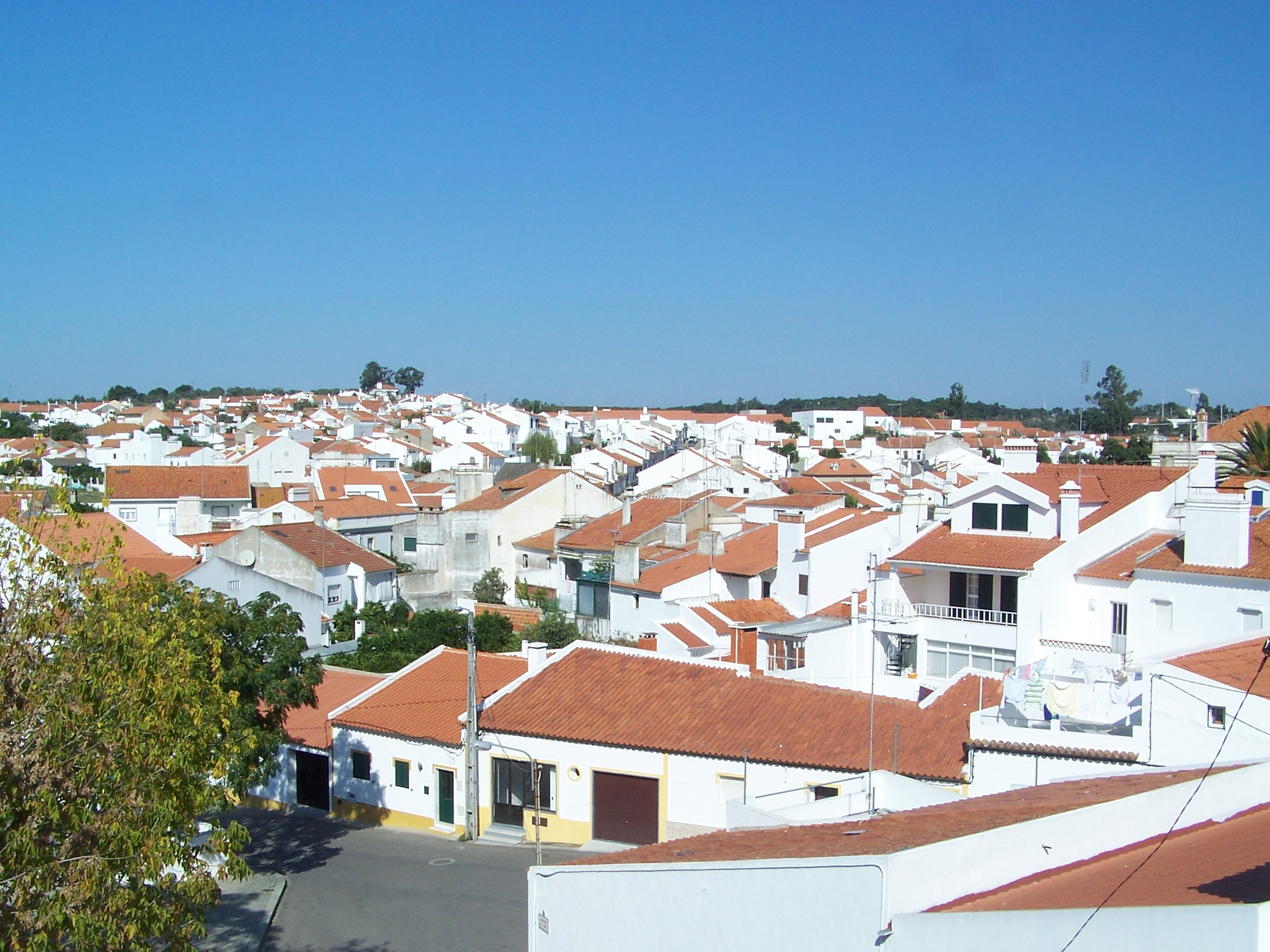
Partial view from the Church

== Facts ==
Cabeção is known for its Sport fishing tracks, and by its wine, made in small wine cellars and clay vases, using traditional methods.

Part of the location is integrated into the Natura 2000 network, due to its importance as a natural habitat and source of biodiversity.
