= Ramal de Mora =

Portuguese railway line

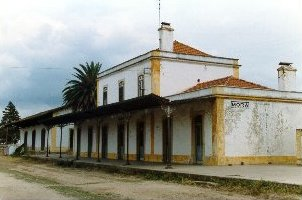
- Mora railway station.

Overview
- Termini: Évora; Mora

History
- Opened: 1908-07-11
- Closed: 1987-05

Technical
- Line length: 60 km (37 mi)
- Track gauge: 1,668 mm (5 ft 5 21/32 in) Iberian gauge
Route map
Location on the network

Ramal de Mora is a closed railway branch in Portugal, which connected Évora and the Linha de Évora, to Mora, spanning a total length of 60 kilometres (37 mi). The railway line was completed in 1908 and closed in 1987.

The railway line was authorized in 1903 by the Portuguese state. Its construction progressed in stages, with the first segment reaching Arraiolos, inaugurated on April 21 1907. The following year, the extension to Pavia was completed in May 1908, and two months later, on 11 July 1908, the line finally reached Mora.

Operations on the Ramal de Mora ceased in May 1987. Since then, the line's infrastructure has deteriorated, although some adaptation work was carried out to repurpose the former railway bed as a recreational path for cyclists and pedestrians. Rails were removed, and the route was fenced off to prevent vehicle access, with some former railway buildings restored.

The railway stations in Arraiolos and Mora were based on a third-class design also seen on the Beira Alta and Beira Baixa lines. The station house in Pavia was smaller.

The station in Mora was situated at the northeastern edge of the urban area, without interfering with the urban areas. On the other hand, in Arraiolos and Pavia the stations were located outside the population centers, isolated from the urban tissue. The Arraiolos station was 2 kilometres (1.2 mi) east of the town, while the Pavia station was 1 kilometre (0.62 mi) southwest of the village.

== Gallery ==
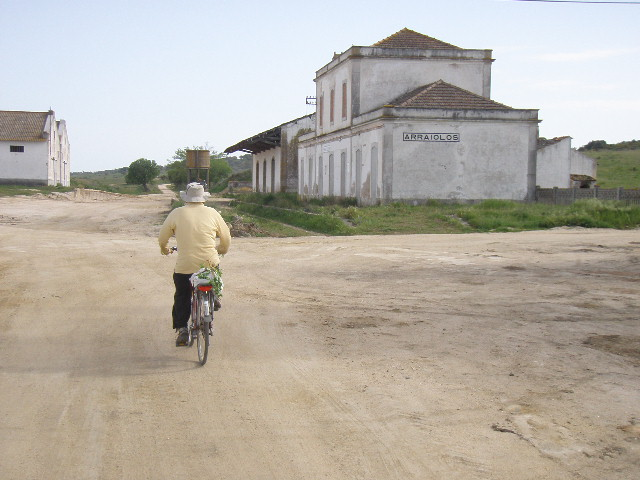
Arraiolos train station, after railway decommission

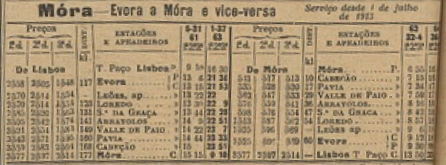
Schedule of Ramal de Mora in 1913

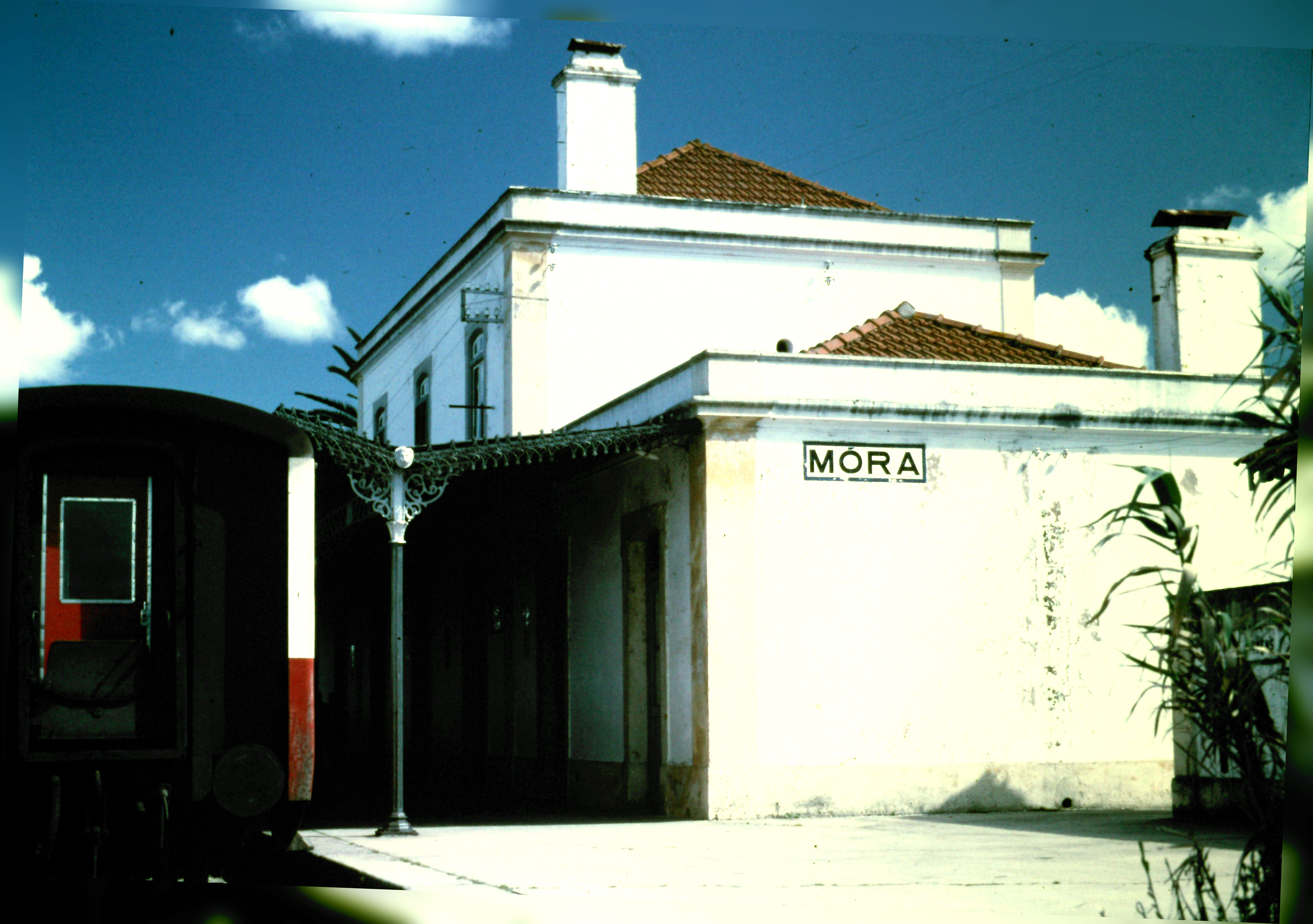
Terminus in Mora

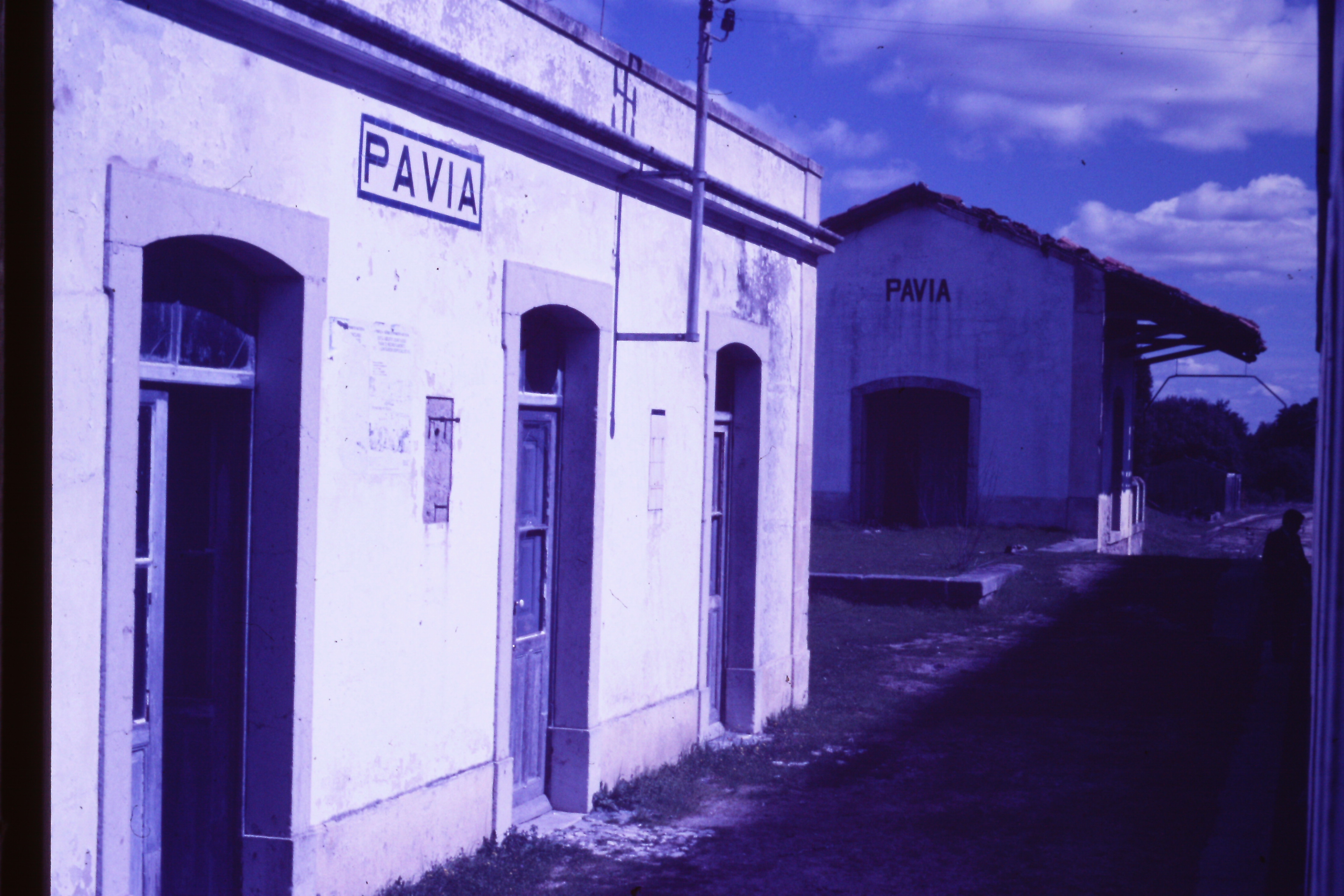
Pavia station

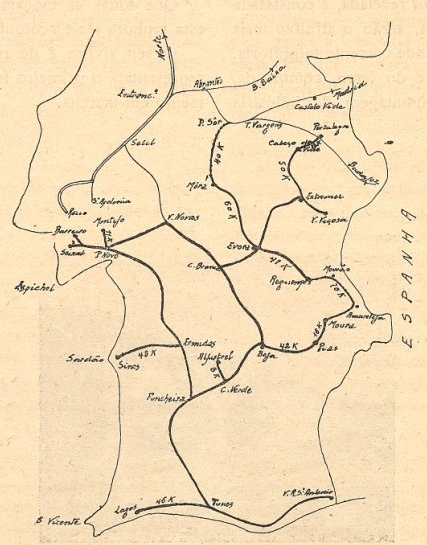
Railway network in southern Portugal in 1941

== See also ==
- List of railway lines in Portugal
- List of Portuguese locomotives and railcars
- History of rail transport in Portugal
