= Castle of Arraiolos =

Castle in Arraiolos, Portugal

Coordinates: 38°43′32″N 7°59′15″W

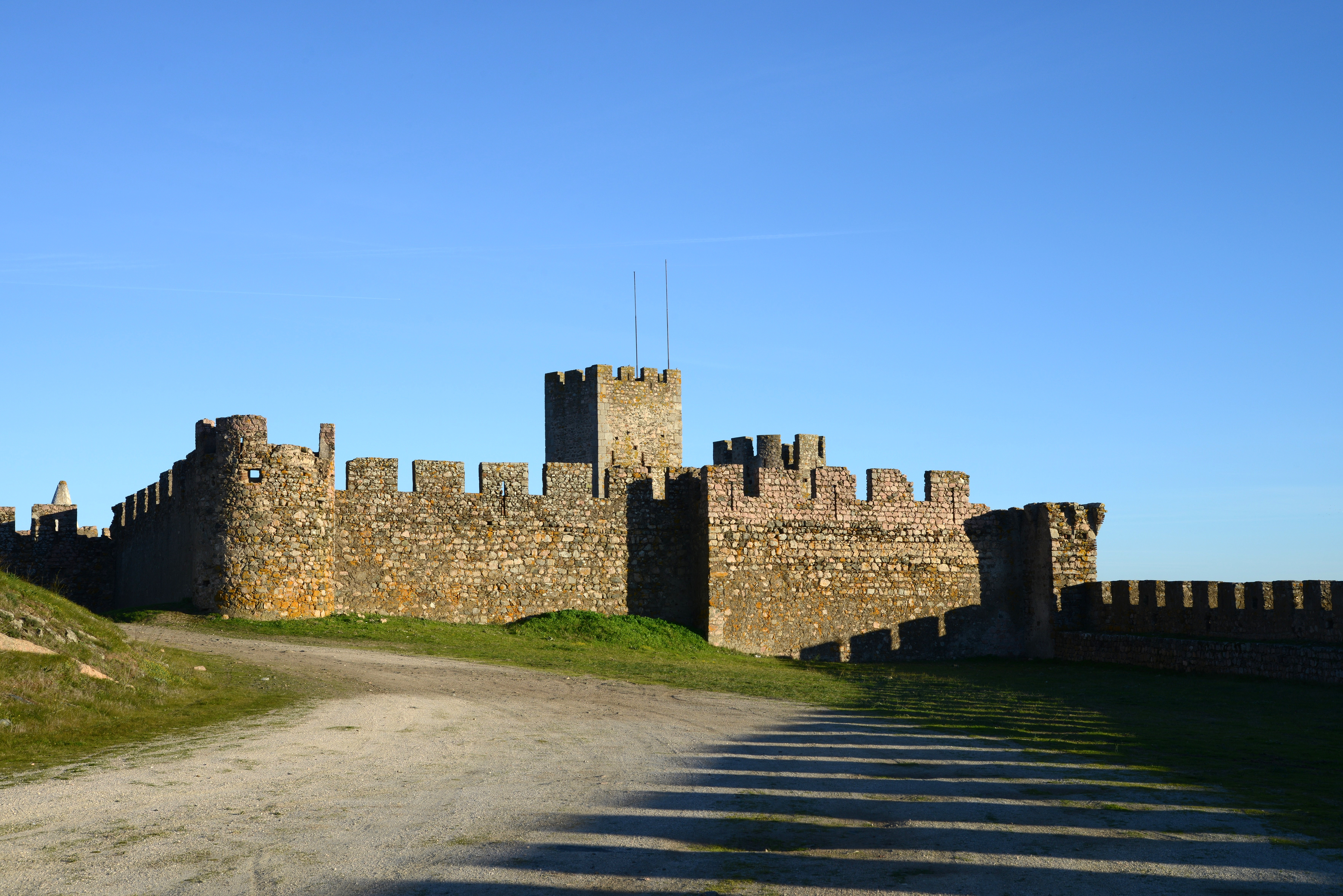
Castle of Arraiolos

The Castle of Arraiolos (Portuguese: Castelo de Arraiolos) is a medieval castle in the civil parish of Arraiolos, municipality of Arraiolos, in the Portuguese district of Évora.

It is classified as a National Monument.
