= Dolmen-Chapel of São Brissos =

Chapel in Santiago do Escoural, Portugal

- Anta-Capela de São Brissos
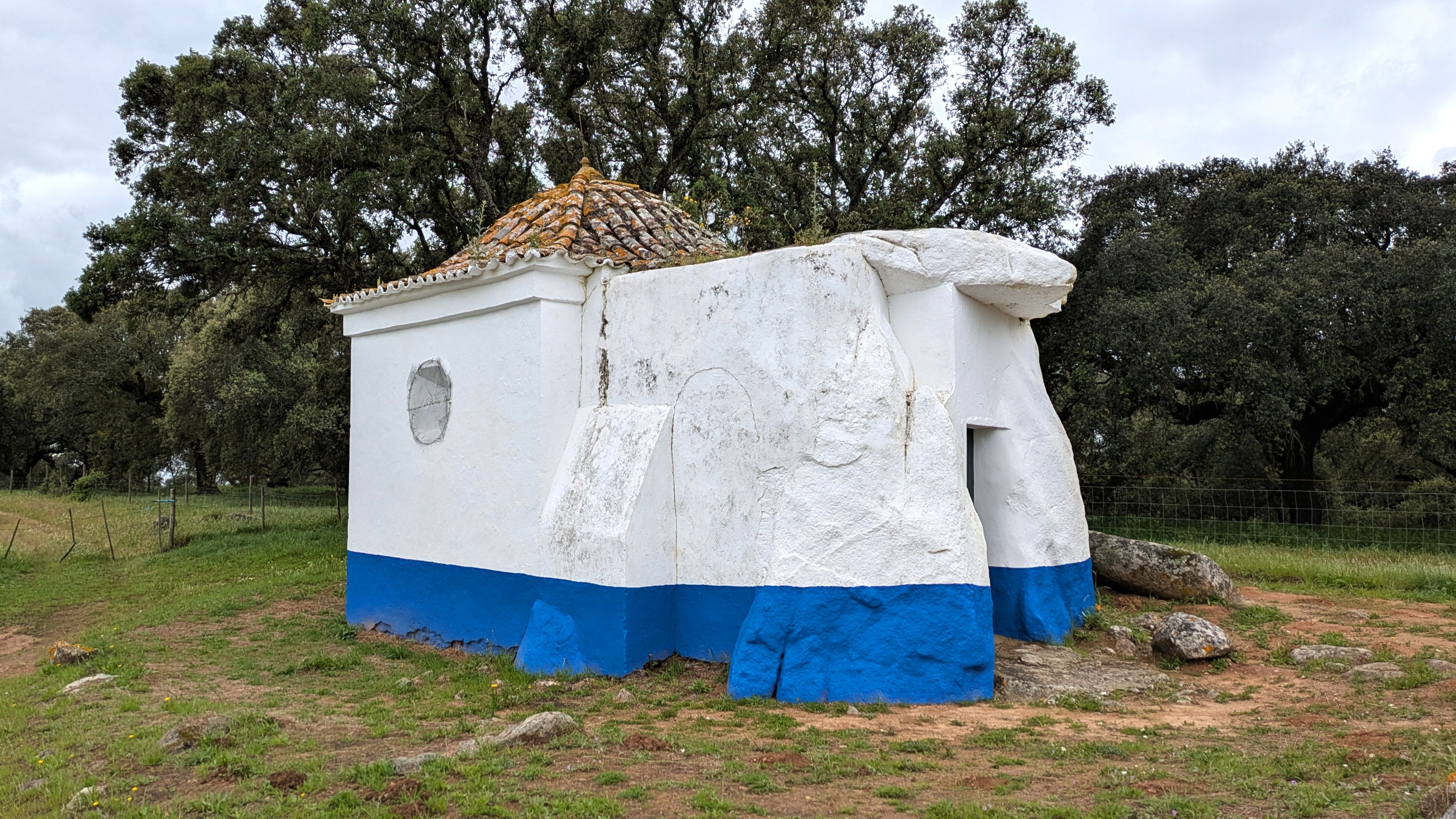
- The chapel in 2011
- Interactive map of Dolmen-Chapel of São Brissos
- 38.52463°N 8.12945°W
- Type: Dolmen (original); Chapel
- Location: Santiago do Escoural, Evora, Portugal

History
- Built: c. 1650

The Dolmen-Chapel of São Brissos (Portuguese: Anta-Capela de São Brissos) is a small chapel located in the parish of Santiago do Escoural in the municipality of Montemor-o-Novo in Portugal. It consists of the conversion of a prehistoric tomb into a Christian building. The dolmen was decreed a National Monument in 1910, while the dolmen-chapel was classified as a Property of Public Interest in 1957.

== Description ==
The dolmen-chapel is situated beside the Valverde-N2 road, near the turn-off to Sao Brissos. The dolmen (Portuguese: anta) is of a Neolithic date and was built between the 4th and 3rd millennium BC. In the 17th-century, a small whitewashed chapel was constructed around the surviving stones of the dolmen. The chapel narthex is formed by the dolmen. Originally formed by granite pillars (five of which remain), the space of the previous burial chamber corresponds to the current atrium of the hermitage, and it is also possible to observe the presence of the primitive covering slab - "hat" - and some traces of the corridor (notably two pillars in situ) of access to its interior.

Similar conversions of megaliths into Christian chapels are found elsewhere in Portugal, including the Anta de Pavia in Évora District and the Anta-Capela de Alcobertas in the Santarém District.
