= Cromeleque das Fontainhas =

Cromlech in Évora District, Portugal

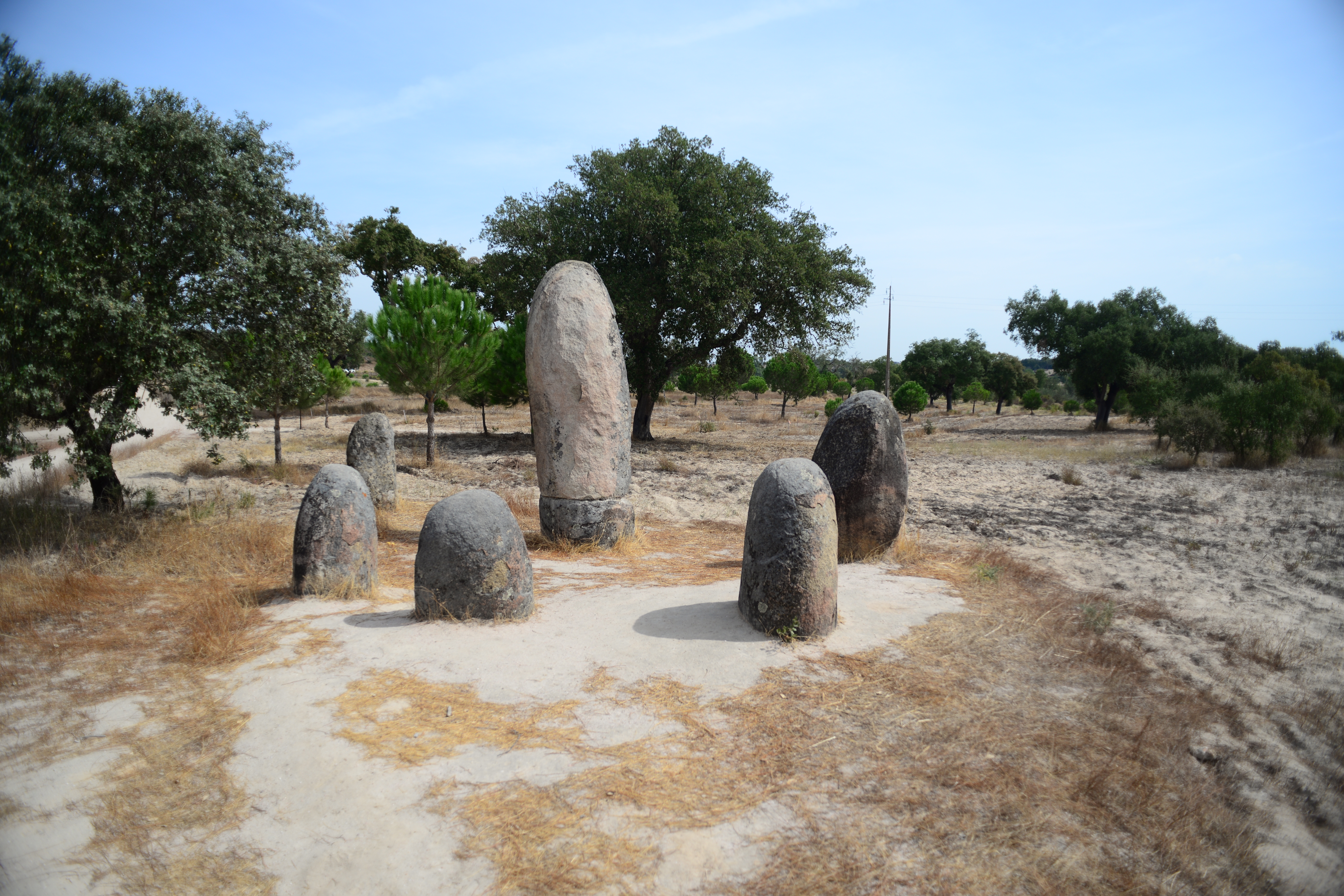
- Interactive map of Cromeleque das Fontainhas
- 38.931°N 8.1211°W
- Type: Cromlech
- Periods: Middle Neolithic;
- Location: Mora, Évora District, Portugal

History
- Built: c. 4000 BCE

Site notes
- Excavation dates: 2005
- Discovered: 1970s
- Condition: Restored
- Public access: Yes

The Cromeleque das Fontainhas, or Cromeleque do Monte das Fontaínhas Velhas is a megalithic stone circle, situated close to the village of Pavia in the municipality of Mora in the Évora District of Portugal. The cromlech dates between the early-4th and mid-3rd millennium BC. It was classified as a monument of public interest on 7 July 1990.

== Description ==
The horseshoe-shaped cromlech is located on a hillside overlooking the River Raia. It was identified as a cromlech in the 1970s, with this discovery being published in 1977. It presently consists of six barrel-shaped standing stones, or menhirs, made of polished, coarse-grained granite but lacking engravings or indentations. The stones are not consistent with the geology of the location, but it is likely that they originated from a site just 1.5 km away. At the time of its discovery, three smaller standing stones of varying sizes were already in place, although inclined to various degrees, and a large stone, of approximately 4.0 meters in length, was found broken near its base, with the lower part still in place. Two more stones were found in the 1990s. Today, all of the identified standing stones have been re-erected in their original positions.

== Excavation ==
The stones were discovered in the 1970s during fieldwork for the preparation of the Geological Map of the region. It was confirmed as a cromlech by Mário Varela Gomes in 1985. In the 1990s, archaeologists Manuel Calado and Leonor Rocha surveyed the surrounding area, identifying the additional stones: one almost fallen, about 70 metres to the northeast of the cromlech and another, 15 metres to the north, embedded at the edge of the dirt road. In August 2005, the same researchers excavated the complex in order to assess the condition of the menhirs' supporting foundations, which indicated that these were well preserved. They also discovered a large number of artifacts, such as microliths made of flint and fragments of ceramics. These enabled them to date the cromlech as being from the Early/Middle Neolithic period.

During the 2005 work all of the stones were returned to their original position, with the exception of the central menhir, which was returned in 2006 when the two parts had been glued together. In addition to the six stones presently in situ, the excavations identified one definite and one possible additional foundation for stones, suggesting that the cromlech originally consisted of the one tall central stone and a circle of seven other stones. Two independent menhirs have been identified nearby, with excavations of these indicating that they were originally placed in their present locations and are in an astronomical alignment.
