= Santiago do Escoural =

Santiago do Escoural Escoural
- Civil parish
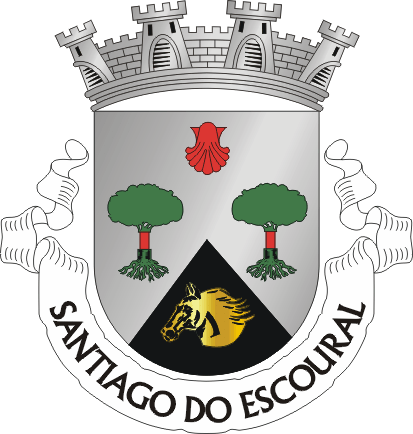
- Coat of arms

- Location in Portugal
- Coordinates: 38.542°N 8.168°W
- Country: Portugal
- Region: Alentejo
- Intermunic. comm.: Alentejo Central
- District: Évora
- Municipality: Montemor-o-Novo

Area
  - Total: 138.70 km^{2} (53.55 sq mi)

Population (2021)
  - Total: 1,047
  - Density: 7.549/km^{2} (19.55/sq mi)
- Time zone: UTC+00:00 (WET)
  - Summer (DST): UTC+01:00 (WEST)
- Postal code: 7050

Santiago do Escoural, also referred to simply as Escoural, is a civil parish in the municipality of Montemor-o-Novo, in the district of Èvora, Portugal. The population in 2011 was 1,335, and 1,047 in 2021. It covers an area of 138.70 km^{2}.

The Escoural Cave is located a few kilometres from the town and is known for its Paleolithic rock art and Neolithic burial site.

== History ==
Human presence in the area of Santiago do Escoural dates back tens of thousands of years. The nearby Escoural Cave, discovered in 1963 during quarrying operations, contains Middle Paleolithic occupations (c. 50,000 years ago), Upper Paleolithic engravings, and a Neolithic funerary chamber, making it one of the most important prehistoric sites in Portugal. The modern settlement developed around agriculture, livestock and traditional Alentejo rural activities. Mining of local geological deposits occurred intermittently during the 19th and early 20th centuries. In 1916, Escoural was elevated to the status of vila (town).

== Geography ==
Santiago do Escoural lies approximately 13 km south of Montemor-o-Novo and around 27 km from Évora. The landscape is typical of the Alentejo region, featuring rolling plains, dryland farming, olive groves, and extensive cork oak (montado) woodlands. The parish is close to the Serra de Monfurado, an area of ecological interest.

== Demographics ==
Like many interior parishes of the Alentejo, Santiago do Escoural has seen gradual population decline throughout the 20th and 21st centuries.

- 2011 population: 1,335
- 2021 population: 1,047

== Economy ==
The local economy is primarily based on agriculture, livestock, forestry and cork production. Traditional activities include cattle and sheep farming, olive oil production and acorn-based pig husbandry. Small-scale commerce, carpentry, construction and services also contribute to the economy.

== Culture and Heritage ==
The parish contains important archaeological and historical monuments, including the Escoural Cave and several megalithic structures such as the Anta-Capela de Nossa Senhora do Livramento. Traditional Alentejo architecture—whitewashed houses with coloured borders and large chimneys—is characteristic of the built environment.

== Transport ==
Santiago do Escoural is crossed by the N2 national road, providing north–south connectivity. The nearest railway station is Casa Branca, located a few kilometres away on the Linha do Alentejo, offering regional connections to Évora, Beja and Lisbon.
