= Alcobertas =

- Civil parish
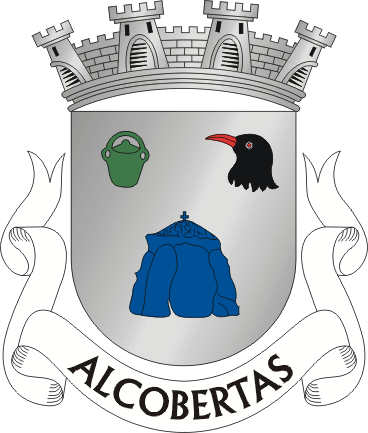
- Coat of arms

- Location in Portugal
- Coordinates: 39.419°N 8.908°W
- Country: Portugal
- Region: Oeste e Vale do Tejo
- Intermunic. comm.: Lezíria do Tejo
- District: Santarém
- Municipality: Rio Maior

Area
  - Total: 32.03 km^{2} (12.37 sq mi)

Population (2011)
  - Total: 1,923
  - Density: 60/km^{2} (160/sq mi)
- Time zone: UTC+00:00 (WET)
  - Summer (DST): UTC+01:00 (WEST)

Alcobertas is a civil parish in the municipality of Rio Maior, Portugal. The population in 2011 was 1,923, in an area of 32.03 km².
