= Rio Maior =

Municipality in Santarém, Portugal

- Municipality
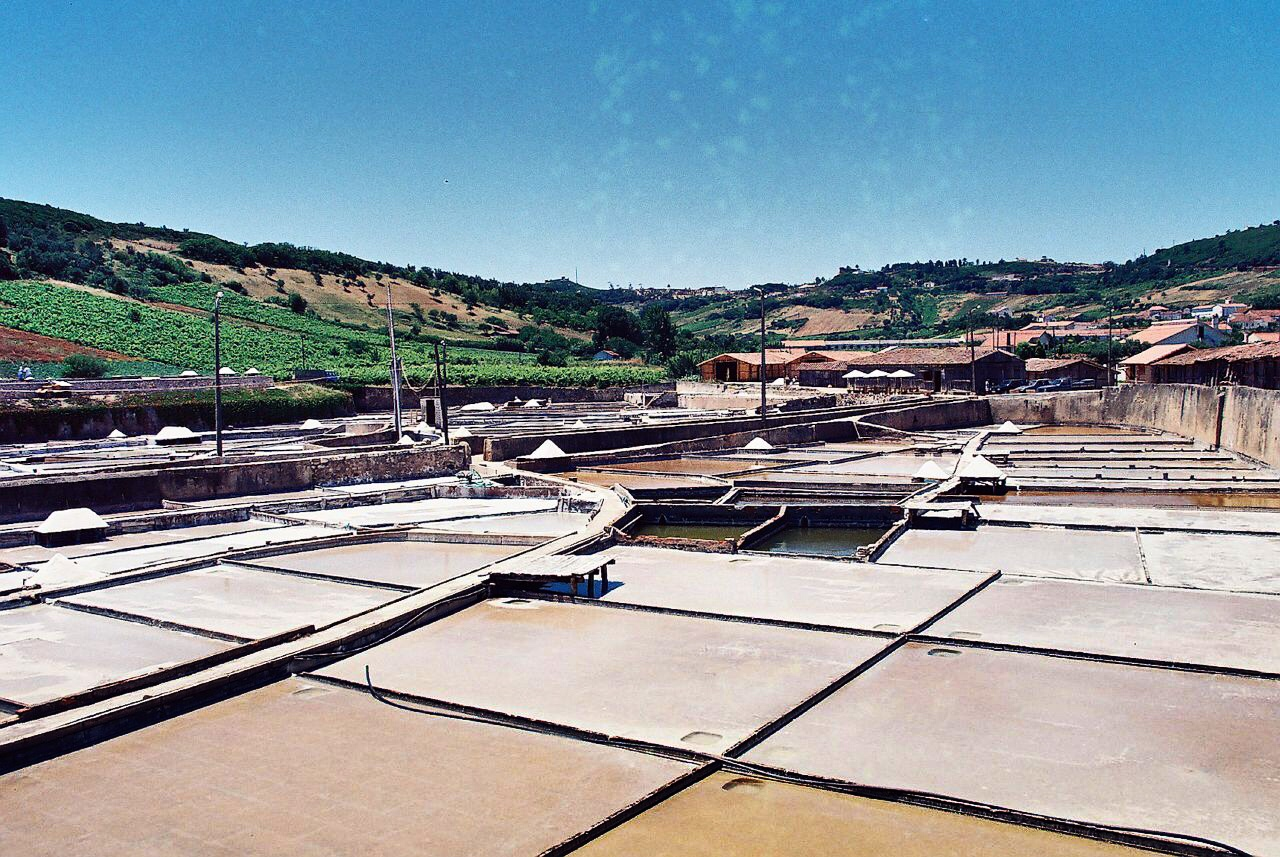
- Salinas de Rio Maior

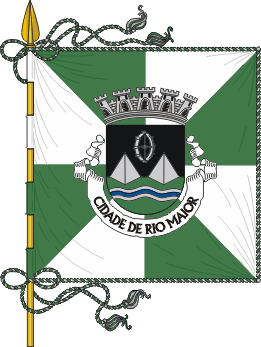
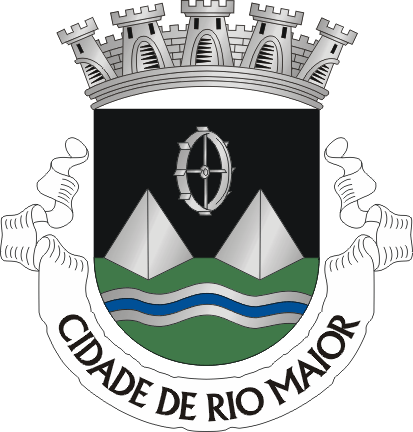
- Flag Coat of arms
- Interactive map of Rio Maior
- Coordinates: 39°20′N 8°56′W
- Country: Portugal
- Region: Oeste e Vale do Tejo
- Intermunic. comm.: Lezíria do Tejo
- District: Santarém
- Parishes: 10

Government
  - President: Luís Filipe Santana Dias (PSD)

Area
  - Total: 272.76 km^{2} (105.31 sq mi)

Population (2011)
  - Total: 21,192
  - Density: 77.695/km^{2} (201.23/sq mi)
- Time zone: UTC+00:00 (WET)
  - Summer (DST): UTC+01:00 (WEST)
- Local holiday: November 6
- Website: www.cm-riomaior.pt

Rio Maior (European Portuguese pronunciation: [ˈʁi.u mɐˈjɔɾ]) is a municipality in the Santarém District in Portugal. The population in 2011 was 21,192, in an area of 272.76 km².

The present mayor is Isaura Morais of the Social Democratic Party (PSD), the first woman to be elected mayor in the municipality. The municipal holiday is November 6.

== Parishes ==
Administratively, the municipality is divided into ten civil parishes (freguesias):

- Alcobertas
- Arrouquelas
- Asseiceira
- Azambujeira e Malaqueijo
- Fráguas
- Marmeleira e Assentiz
- Outeiro da Cortiçada e Arruda dos Pisões
- Rio Maior
- São João da Ribeira e Ribeira de São João
- São Sebastião

== Climate ==
Rio Maior has a Mediterranean climate with warm to hot, dry summers and mild, wet winters. Rio Maior registered a temperature of 44.9 °C (112.8 °F) on 4 August 2018 and −6.2 °C (20.8 °F) on January and February.

Climate data for Rio Maior, 1961-1990 normals, 1984-2020 precipitation
Month	Jan	Feb	Mar	Apr	May	Jun	Jul	Aug	Sep	Oct	Nov	Dec	Year
Record high °C (°F)	22.1 (71.8)	26.4 (79.5)	27.2 (81.0)	29.0 (84.2)	37.0 (98.6)	41.7 (107.1)	40.7 (105.3)	41.4 (106.5)	39.8 (103.6)	34.4 (93.9)	28.7 (83.7)	22.8 (73.0)	41.7 (107.1)
Mean daily maximum °C (°F)	14.7 (58.5)	15.4 (59.7)	17.6 (63.7)	18.9 (66.0)	21.5 (70.7)	25.0 (77.0)	27.7 (81.9)	28.3 (82.9)	27.4 (81.3)	23.0 (73.4)	17.9 (64.2)	15.1 (59.2)	21.0 (69.9)
Daily mean °C (°F)	9.1 (48.4)	10.2 (50.4)	11.8 (53.2)	13.3 (55.9)	15.7 (60.3)	18.8 (65.8)	21.2 (70.2)	21.5 (70.7)	20.2 (68.4)	16.6 (61.9)	12.3 (54.1)	9.7 (49.5)	15.0 (59.1)
Mean daily minimum °C (°F)	3.5 (38.3)	5.0 (41.0)	6.0 (42.8)	7.7 (45.9)	9.9 (49.8)	12.6 (54.7)	14.7 (58.5)	14.7 (58.5)	13.0 (55.4)	10.2 (50.4)	6.7 (44.1)	4.3 (39.7)	9.0 (48.3)
Average precipitation mm (inches)	104.0 (4.09)	72.2 (2.84)	55.1 (2.17)	63.7 (2.51)	58.9 (2.32)	16.5 (0.65)	8.2 (0.32)	6.4 (0.25)	40.5 (1.59)	96.0 (3.78)	113.4 (4.46)	113.8 (4.48)	748.7 (29.46)
Average relative humidity (%)	88	85	78	74	71	70	68	66	71	81	87	89	77
Source: IPMA, Portuguese Environment Agency

== Notable people ==
- Duarte da Silva Marques (born 1983 in Rio Maior) a triathlete, competed at the 2008 Summer Olympics
- Pedro Oliveira (born 1988 in Rio Maior) a backstroke and butterfly swimmer, participated in the 2008 & 2012 Summer Olympics
- Miguel Carvalho (born 1994) a racewalker, took part in the 2016 Summer Olympics
