= Mora, Portugal =

Mora
- Municipality
- Town of Mora
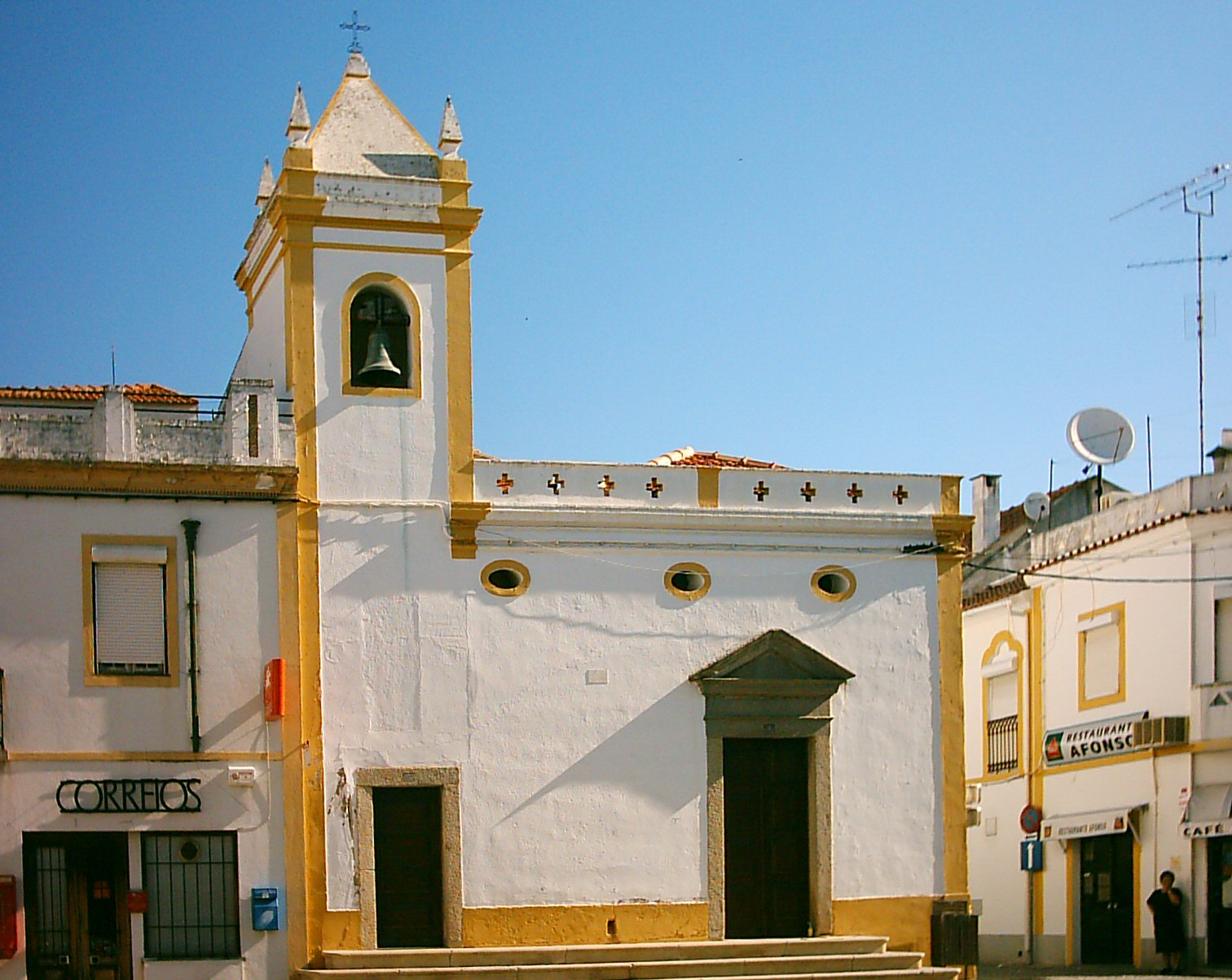

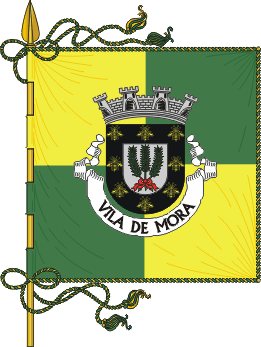
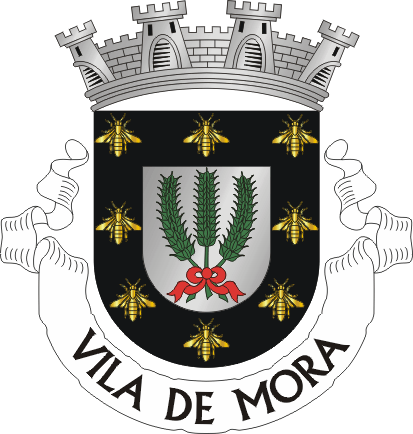
- Flag Coat of arms
- Interactive map of Mora
- Coordinates: 38°56′N 8°09′W
- Country: Portugal
- Region: Alentejo
- Intermunic. comm.: Alentejo Central
- District: Évora
- Parishes: 4

Government
  - President: Paula Cristina Calado Chuço (PS)

Area
  - Total: 443.95 km^{2} (171.41 sq mi)

Population (2011)
  - Total: 4,978
  - Density: 11.21/km^{2} (29.04/sq mi)
- Time zone: UTC+00:00 (WET)
  - Summer (DST): UTC+01:00 (WEST)
- Local holiday: Easter Monday date varies
- Website: http://www.cm-mora.pt

Mora (Portuguese pronunciation: [ˈmɔɾɐ]), officially the Town of Mora (Portuguese: Vila de Mora), is a town and municipality in Évora District in Portugal. The population in 2011 was 4,978, in an area of 443.95 km^{2}.

The present Mayor is Paula Cristina Calado Chuço, elected by the Socialist Party in 2021. The municipal holiday is Easter Monday.

== Prehistory ==
The municipality contains several prehistoric sites. These include the Cromeleque das Fontainhas, a megalithic stone circle and the Anta de Pavia, a Neolithic burial tomb that was converted into a chapel in the early 17th-century. These and other sites are well represented by the Museu Interactivo do Megalitismo (Interactive Megalithic Museum) in Mora town.

== Climate ==
Mora is situated at 58 m height near the river Sorraia. With a hot summer mediterranean climate (Köppen climate classification: Csa), it has mild, humid winters and hot, dry summers. The meteorological station is situated at 129 m height and therefore shows slightly lower temperatures than measured in Mora proper.

Nevertheless, on the 29 June 2025 it registered 46.6 °C (115.9 °F), a new Portuguese record for the month of June eclipsing the 45.4 °C (113.7 °F) which was reached in Alvega just a day before. This value also meant a new Iberian record, beating the recent record of El Granado in Spain (a couple of metres from the Spanish/Portuguese border) of 46 °C (115 °F). On May 27, 2026, Mora recorded a maximum temperature of 40.3 °C (104.5 °F), the highest value ever recorded in Portugal for the month of May.

Climate data for Mora (1991-2020), extremes (1981-present)
Month	Jan	Feb	Mar	Apr	May	Jun	Jul	Aug	Sep	Oct	Nov	Dec	Year
Record high °C (°F)	24.9 (76.8)	26.2 (79.2)	30.9 (87.6)	36.9 (98.4)	40.3 (104.5)	46.6 (115.9)	45.4 (113.7)	45.7 (114.3)	43.7 (110.7)	37.3 (99.1)	27.5 (81.5)	23.9 (75.0)	46.6 (115.9)
Mean daily maximum °C (°F)	14.5 (58.1)	16.1 (61.0)	19.3 (66.7)	21.3 (70.3)	25.0 (77.0)	29.4 (84.9)	32.4 (90.3)	32.7 (90.9)	29.0 (84.2)	23.7 (74.7)	17.8 (64.0)	14.9 (58.8)	23.0 (73.4)
Daily mean °C (°F)	9.2 (48.6)	10.3 (50.5)	13.1 (55.6)	14.9 (58.8)	18.1 (64.6)	21.6 (70.9)	23.9 (75.0)	24.1 (75.4)	21.6 (70.9)	17.6 (63.7)	12.6 (54.7)	10.0 (50.0)	16.4 (61.6)
Mean daily minimum °C (°F)	4.0 (39.2)	4.5 (40.1)	7.0 (44.6)	8.5 (47.3)	11.2 (52.2)	13.8 (56.8)	15.3 (59.5)	15.6 (60.1)	14.1 (57.4)	11.6 (52.9)	7.5 (45.5)	5.0 (41.0)	9.8 (49.7)
Record low °C (°F)	−9.0 (15.8)	−5.0 (23.0)	−2.5 (27.5)	−1.8 (28.8)	1.0 (33.8)	5.2 (41.4)	7.5 (45.5)	7.5 (45.5)	4.0 (39.2)	1.5 (34.7)	−5.0 (23.0)	−6.5 (20.3)	−9.0 (15.8)
Average precipitation mm (inches)	64.0 (2.52)	47.1 (1.85)	47.0 (1.85)	49.4 (1.94)	44.7 (1.76)	10.6 (0.42)	2.4 (0.09)	4.7 (0.19)	27.3 (1.07)	71.3 (2.81)	74.8 (2.94)	67.1 (2.64)	510.4 (20.08)
Average precipitation days (≥ 1 mm)	8.4	7.1	7.2	7.4	5.9	2.0	0.6	1.1	3.4	7.8	8.5	8.7	68.1
Source: Instituto Português do Mar e da Atmosfera

== Parishes ==
Administratively, the municipality is divided into 4 civil parishes (freguesias):

- Brotas
- Cabeção
- Mora
- Pavia

== Gallery ==
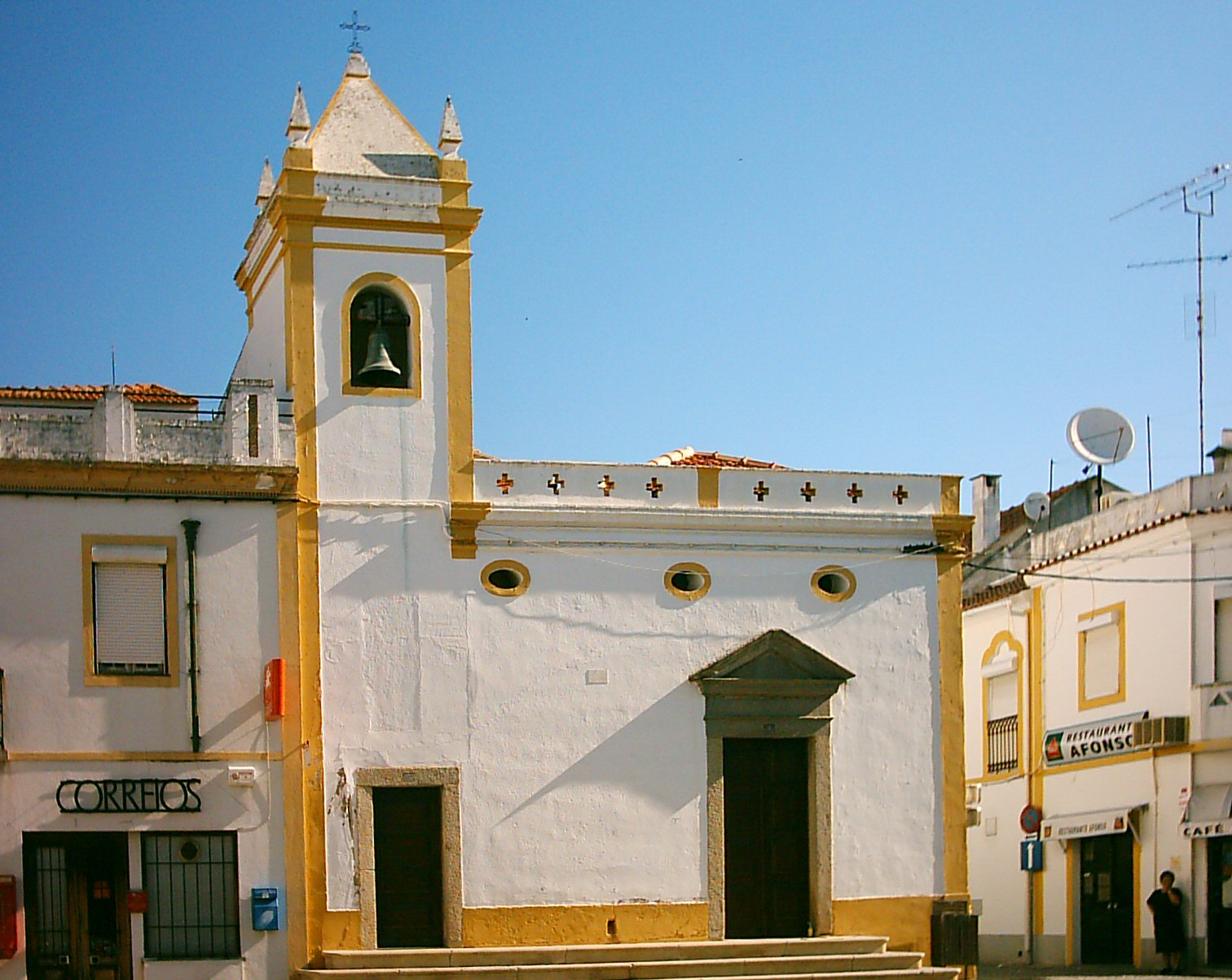
Main church of Mora

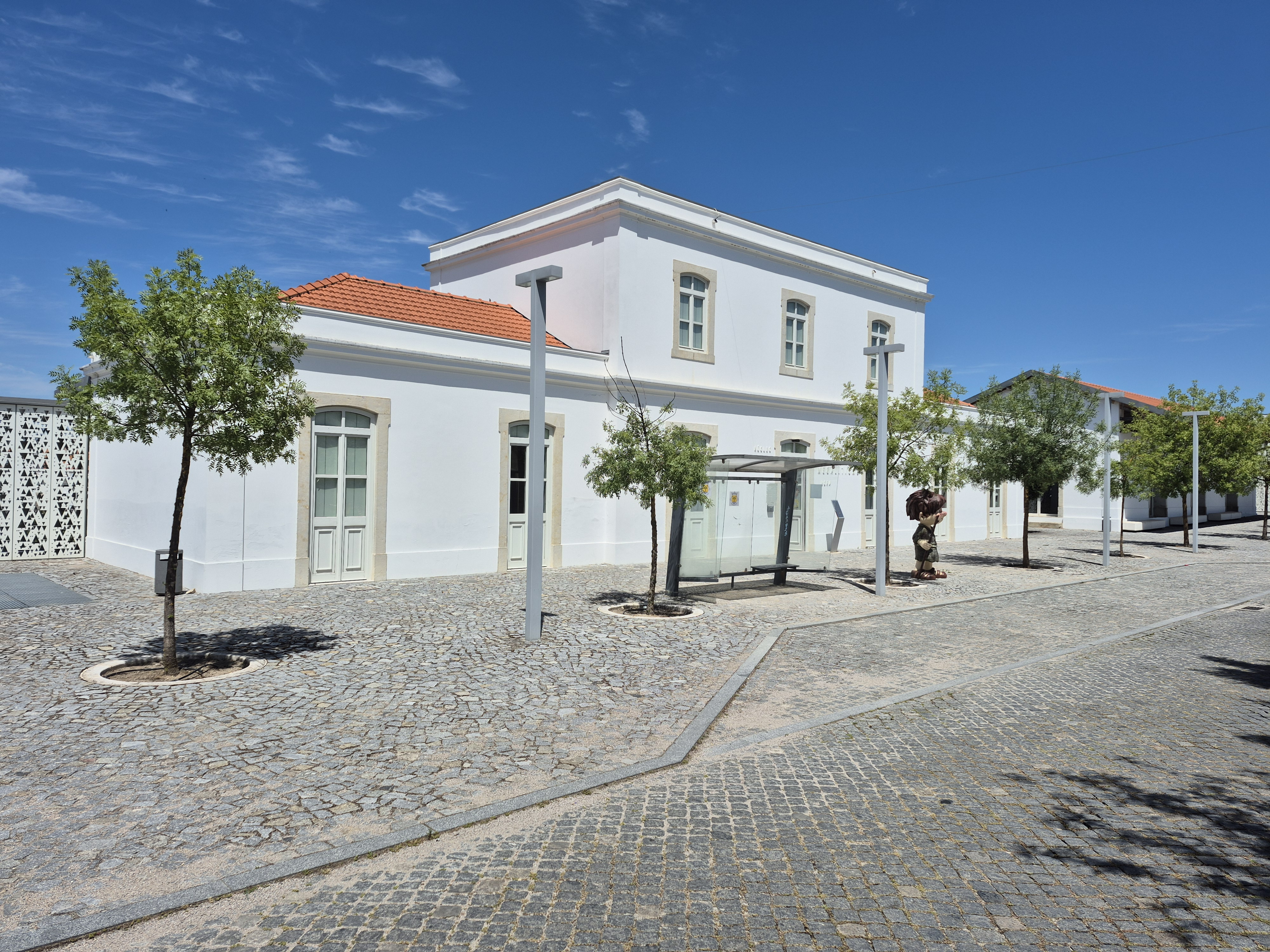
The Megalithic Museum

== Notable people ==
- José Pedro Biléu (1932–2016) a former Portuguese footballer with 303 caps with Lusitano de Évora
