= Continental Portugal =

Mainland Portugal

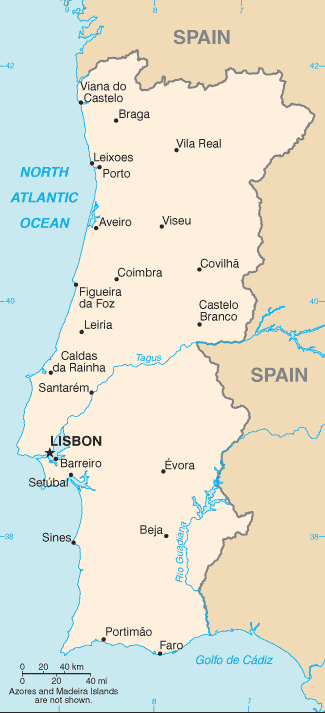
Map of continental Portugal

Continental Portugal (Portuguese: Portugal continental, IPA: [puɾtuˈɣal kõtinẽˈtal]) or mainland Portugal comprises the bulk of the Portuguese Republic, namely that part on the Iberian Peninsula and so in continental Europe, having approximately 95% of the total population and 96.6% of the country's land. Mainland Portugal is therefore commonly called by residents of the Portuguese archipelagos of the Azores and Madeira the continent (Portuguese: o continente) in all respects including minor elements of combined governance from Lisbon, the country's capital. Before 1975, when the Portuguese territory also stretched to several now-independent states in Africa, the designation metropole (Portuguese: metrópole) was also used.

== Context ==
The designation mainland Portugal is used to differentiate the continental territory of Portugal from its insular territory. The latter comprises the archipelagos of Madeira and Azores in the Atlantic Ocean. The Azores and Madeira are also commonly referred to as the autonomous regions (Portuguese: as regiões autónomas), insular Portugal (Portuguese: Portugal Insular) or, simply, the islands (Portuguese: as ilhas).

Continental Portugal is divided into 18 districts. Outside of these the islands of Madeira and the Azores are the Autonomous Regions of Portugal.

The European Nomenclature of Territorial Units for Statistics defines the geographic plurality of the mainland Portugal and the islands as the primary NUTS I territorial division (see administrative divisions of Portugal: NUTS for details).

While in modern Portugal the difference between European continental and total territory is minor (in terms of area), it mattered during the existence of the Portuguese Empire, when the distinction was more frequently made, such as in the colonisation of Brazil. Continental Portugal has an area of 89,015 square kilometres (34,369 mi^{2}) or 96.6% of the Portuguese national territory (92,145 square kilometres (35,577 mi^{2})) and 10,912,573 inhabitants (or 95.52% of the total population of 11,424,031).

== Districts ==
Districts of Portugal

District	Province(s)	EU Statistical region(s)
Viana do Castelo	Minho	Alto Minho
Braga	Minho	Ave; Cávado; Tâmega e Sousa
Porto	Douro Litoral	Porto; Tâmega e Sousa
Vila Real	Trás-os-Montes e Alto Douro	Douro; Alto Tâmega; Ave
Bragança	Trás-os-Montes e Alto Douro	Trás-os-Montes (majority); Douro
Aveiro	Beira Litoral (majority); Douro Litoral	Aveiro (majority); Coimbra; Porto; Tâmega e Sousa
Viseu	Beira Alta (majority); Trás-os-Montes e Alto Douro; Douro Litoral	Viseu Dão Lafões (majority); Douro; Beira Litoral; Tâmega e Sousa
Guarda	Beira Alta (majority); Trás-os-Montes e Alto Douro	Beiras e Serra da Estrela (majority); Viseu Dão Lafões; Douro
Coimbra	Beira Litoral (majority); Beira Alta; Beira Baixa	Coimbra
Castelo Branco	Beira Baixa	Beira Baixa; Beiras e Serra da Estrela; Médio Tejo
Leiria	Beira Litoral; Estremadura	Leiria; Oeste
Santarém	Ribatejo (majority); Beira Litoral; Beira Baixa	Médio Tejo; Lezíria do Tejo
Lisbon	Estremadura (majority); Ribatejo	Lisbon (majority); Oeste; Lezíria do Tejo
Portalegre	Alto Alentejo (majority); Ribatejo	Alto Alentejo
Évora	Alto Alentejo	Alentejo Central
Setúbal	Estremadura; Baixo Alentejo	Setúbal Peninsula; Alentejo Litoral
Beja	Baixo Alentejo	Baixo Alentejo (majority); Alentejo Litoral
Faro	Algarve	Algarve

== EU Statistical Regions (NUTS II) ==
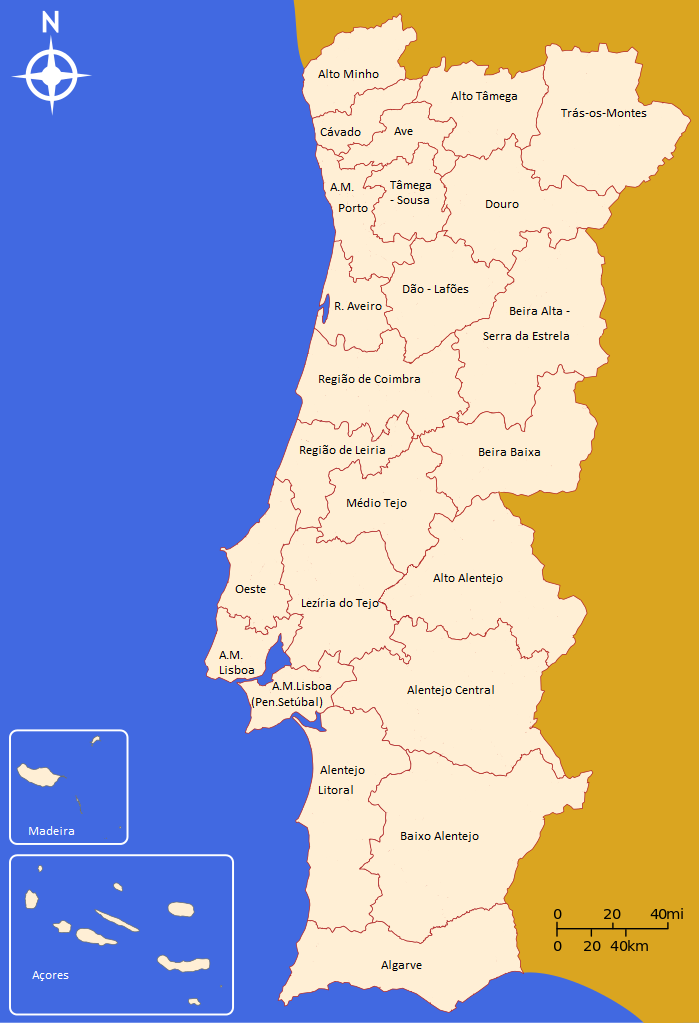
NUTS3 Portugal

NUTS II	Districts (entirely or partly included)
Norte Alto Minho Cávado Ave Porto Douro Tâmega e Sousa Alto Tâmega Trás-os-Montes	Viana do Castelo, Braga, Porto, Aveiro (part), Guarda (part), Viseu (part), Vila Real, Bragança
Centro Beira Baixa Beiras e Serra da Estrela Região de Aveiro Região de Coimbra Região de Leiria Viseu Dão Lafões	Castelo Branco, Guarda (majority) Aveiro (majority), Coimbra, Leiria (part), Viseu (majority)
Oeste e Vale do Tejo Oeste Médio Tejo Lezíria do Tejo	Santarém, Leiria (part)
Greater Lisbon Greater Lisbon	Lisbon (majority)
Setúbal Peninsula Setúbal Peninsula	Setúbal (part)
Alentejo Alentejo Litoral Alentejo Central Alto Alentejo Baixo Alentejo	Setúbal (part), Évora, Portalegre, Beja
Algarve Algarve	Faro

== See also ==
- Administrative divisions of Portugal
- Autonomous Regions of Portugal
- Districts of Portugal
- Exclusive economic zone of Portugal
- List of regions and sub-regions of Portugal
- Pluricontinentalism
