= Provinces of Portugal =

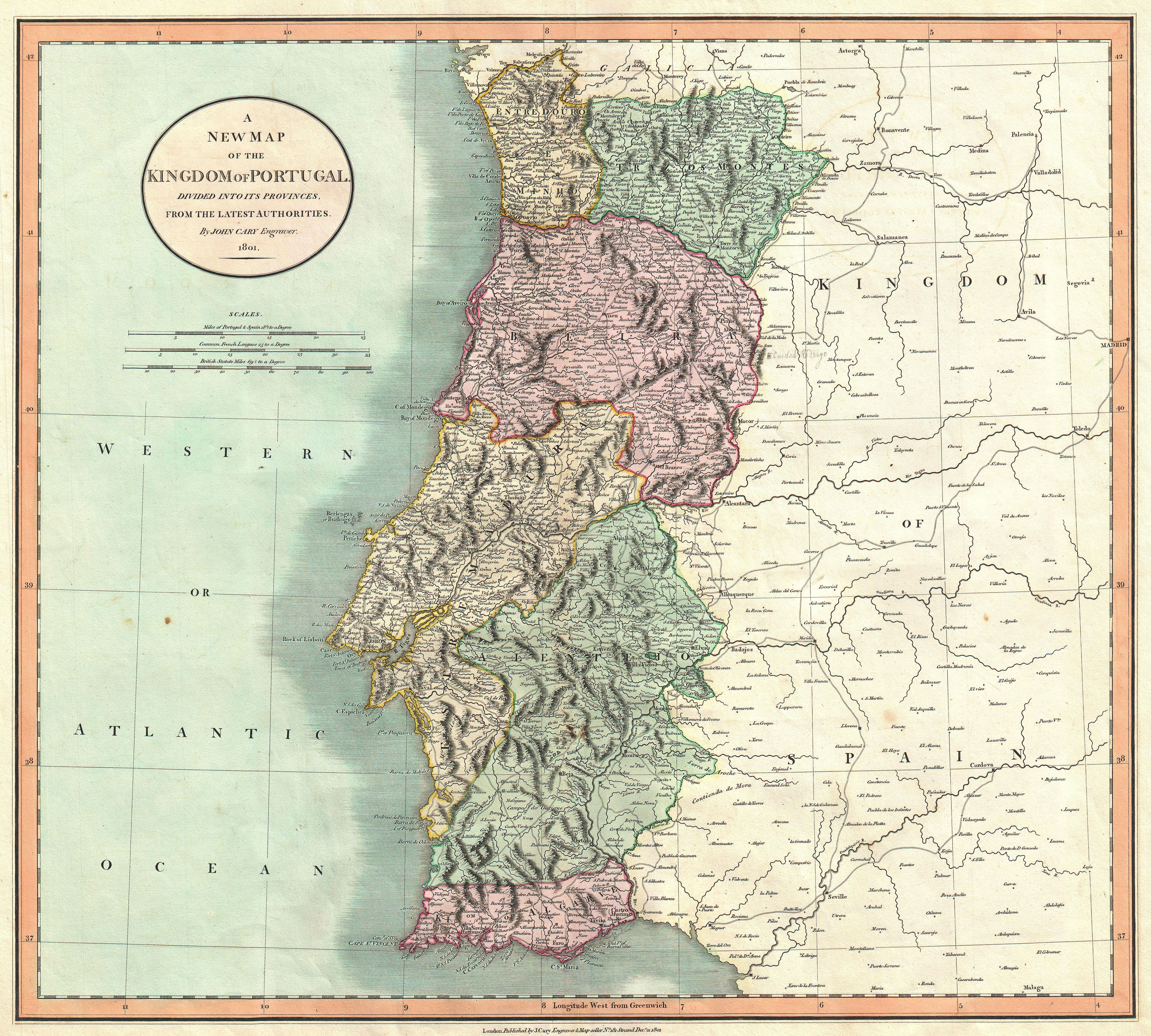
The provinces demarked in a 1801 map

The term "provinces" (Portuguese: províncias) has been used throughout history to identify regions of continental Portugal. Current legal subdivisions of Portugal do not coincide with the provinces, but several provinces, in their 19th- and 20th-century versions, still correspond to culturally relevant, strongly self-identifying categories. They include:

- Alentejo (Alto Alentejo, Baixo Alentejo)
- Algarve
- Beira (Beira Alta, Beira Baixa, Beira Litoral)
- Entre Douro e Minho (Douro Litoral, Minho)
- Estremadura (Estremadura, Ribatejo)
- Trás-os-Montes

The islands of Azores and Madeira were never called "provinces".

== History ==
The first provinces, instituted during the Roman occupation of the Iberian peninsula, divided the peninsula into three areas: Tarraconensis, Lusitania and Baetica, established by Roman Emperor Augustus between 27 and 13 B.C. Emperor Diocletian reordered these territories in the third century, dividing Tarraconesis into three separate territories: Tarraconensis, Carthaginensis and Gallaecia. At that time Tarraconesis included northern Portugal, Gallaecia and Asturias.

What would develop into the Kingdom of Portugal, was itself a province of the Kingdom of León. During the Reconquista, the Iberian kingdoms established an administrative system, based on the older Visigothic lines, which were themselves just a carry-over from the Romans. The kingdoms were divided into provinces or counties, headed by a local governors (referred to as a count, duke or prince), who also subdivided the land administratively into smaller parcels, headed by lieutenants. The first County of Portugal, or Portucale, was a fiefdom of León, under Alfonso III of León, which was succeeded in the 12th century by the Second County of Portugal, paving the way for the independent Kingdom of Portugal.

=== Comarcas ===
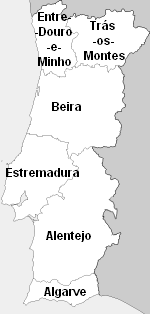
The six medieval provinces of the Kingdom of Portugal

After the 15th century, the new Kingdom of Portugal was divided into six great administrative units, referred to as comarcas. From north to south, they were:

- Comarca of Trás-os-Montes – delimited in the west by the Tâmega River and south by the Douro River;
- Comarca of Entre-Douro-e-Minho – delimited in the south by the Douro River and east by the Tâmega River;
- Comarca of Beira – initially an extense band within the interior of the country, between the Douro River and the Tagus River, in the 16th century it was expanded to the coast, to include the areas of Estremadura;
- Comarca of Estremadura – initial a coastal area, between Douro and Tagus Rivers, in the 16th century, the northern border was limited to south of the Mondego River, while its southern limit expanded towards the Tagus, encompassing the peninsula of Setúbal;
- Comarca of Entre-Tejo-e-Odiana – delimited to the north by the Tagus River and south by the Serra do Caldeirão;
- Kingdom of the Algarve – includes the southern coast until the Serra do Caldeirão.

The comarca of Entre-Tejo-e-Odiana would later be renamed as Comarca of Alentejo, while by the late 16th century, the comarcas would start to be referred to as províncias (English: provinces).

Each comarca was headed by an administrative and judicial magistrate, which represented Royal power in each jurisdiction of the country. These magistrates were, initially, called tenents (English: lieutenants), later meirinhos-mores and finally, corregedores. These six comarcas, with some changes, would be maintained as the principal administrative division of country until the 19th century.

=== Provinces ===
Around the 17th century, the provinces were subdivided into individual comarcas or correições (English: corrections), with their own corregedor (English: law judges), and the provinces, as an administrative and civic role, began to be used as a statistical unit. Meanwhile, at the same time that its administrative role ceased, the Kingdom instituted a system of governadores das armas (English: military governors), whose jurisdiction coincided with the provincial territories. This division between military and civic authorities were maintained until the administrative reforms of 1832.

Until the end of the 18th century, feudal territories of the clergy or nobility, were referred to as ouvidorias, whose function was similar to the comarca, but which were governed/administered by nominated feudal regents. In 1790, these ouvidorias were transformed into comarcas, with corregedores nominated directly by the Crown. By 1801, the provinces included the following administrative divisions:

- Province of Entre-Douro-e-Minho – Valença, Viana, Braga, Barcelos, Guimarães, Porto, Penafiel;
- Province of Trás-os-Montes – Bragança, Miranda, Moncorvo, Vila Real;
- Province of Beira – Feira, Aveiro, Lamego, Trancoso, Pinhel, Guarda, Linhares, Viseu, Castelo Branco, Arganil, Coimbra, Leiria, Ourém, Cinco Vilas (Chão de Couce), Tomar;
- Province of Estremadura – Santarém, Alcobaça, Alenquer, Torres Vedras, Ribatejo (Vila Franca de Xira), Lisboa, Setúbal;
- Province of Alentejo – Crato, Portalegre, Vila Viçosa, Avis, Elvas, Évora, Beja, Ourique;
- Kingdom of the Algarve – Lagos, Faro, Tavira;

In parallel with these comarcas (the administrative and judicial regions), the provinces began to be subdivided into almoxarifados, (English: fiscal districts) and emprovedorias (English: health/social districts), in order to manage imports/exports and finances, as well as health and social issues, respectively. Similarly, in 1758, the Partido do Porto, a military division, under the responsibility of the military governor was instituted to include areas of the provinces of Entre-Douro-e-Minho and Beira in order to connect these provinces.

=== Prefectures ===
After the Liberal Revolution of 1820, there were many proposals to reform the administrative divisions of the country. But, due to Miguelist counter-revolutions, these reforms were delayed. In 1832, the Liberal government-in-exile in the Azores, decreed the establishment of a new system for Portugal, which would approximate the already existing provinces of Portugal. In actuality, one new province was established Douro, based on the territory of Partido do Porto, and which began to function with all the rights and privileges. In addition, the Provinces would begin to function throughout the national territory, including the archipelagos of the Azores and Madeira, as well as the overseas territories (the Portuguese colonies in Africa, India and Southeast Asia).

In comparison with the period before the 17th century, the provinces of 1832, or prefeituras (English: prefectures), began to operate as administrative units, led by a prefeito (English: prefect) who was a representative of the central government. These prefects were assisted by a junta geral, that acted as an organ of the local government, elected by the citizens of the province. The provinces continued to be divided into comarcas or subprefeituras (English: sub-prefectures), which functioned as an area of jurisdiction of sub-prefects, who represented the prefect. Parallel with this system, the territory is divided into concelhos (English: municipalities), each led by a provedor (or representative of the prefect) and assisted by the câmara municipal (English: municipal chamber or municipal council), which were elected by its citizens. These reforms resulted in the extinction of a number of smaller municipalities (due to lack of population or finances). The elimination of these municipalities were complemented by the appearance of the administrative parish, a subdivision of the latter, which was administered by the comissário de paróquia (English: commissioner of the parish), and assisted by the junta de paróquia (English: parish council).

The eight prefectures (provinces) were:

- Prefecture of Minho – Ponte de Lima, Monção, Braga, Barcelos, Guimarães
- Prefecture of Trás-os-Montes – Bragança, Chaves, Moncorvo, Vila Real
- Prefecture of Douro – Porto, Penafiel, Feira, Aveiro
- Prefecture of Beira Alta – Viseu, Lamego, Trancoso, Guarda
- Prefecture of Beira Baixa – Coimbra, Castelo Branco, Seia, Tomar, Leiria
- Prefecture of Estremadura – Santarém, Alenquer, Torres Vedras, Lisboa
- Prefecture of Alentejo – Setúbal, Portalegre, Elvas, Beja, Évora, Beja, Ourique
- Prefecture of Algarve – Lagos, Faro, Tavira

Meanwhile, each of the archipelagos of Madeira and the Azores were constituted as individual provinces: Prefecture of Madeira and the Prefecture of the Azores (which was itself subdivided into Angra and Ponta Delgada sub-prefectures, known as Prefecture Ocidental and Oriental in 1833). In addition the colonies were reorganized into provinces of Cabo Verde and Guiné, Angola, Mozambique, Índia, São Tomé and Príncipe and Macau and Timor, each with their own prefect and junta geral, equivalent to the national division of provinces.

The 1832 system lasted a short time, and were replaced by the 1835 reforms heralded by the Liberal victory of 1834. The prefectures and junta gerais of the provinces were abolished, the comarcas/sub-prefectures were transformed into districts, while the sub-prefectures were retooled as governadores civis, assisted by a district junta geral. The debate over the importance of provinces only arose from fears that there would be an excessive concentration of power in the hands of governmental officers (Portuguese: prefeitos). The adoption of the 17 districts (1835) instead of eight provinces was an attempt to dissolve such power. The older provedores begin to act as the municipal administrators, and parish commissioners become regedores (removing the ecclesiastical reference from their use). The provinces continue to appear in the lexicon, but only as a grouping of districts, without any administrative or military significance, and like 1832, they continued to function as a statistical and referential units of geography.

=== New Provinces ===
11 provinces established 1936

The Estado Novo adopted, from its beginning, a policy of regionalisation of the country, which was written into the 1933 Constitution, creating new provinces, within an executive body, the juntas de provincia (English: provincial junta) and a deliberative body, the conselhos provinciais (English: provincial councils).

Created in 1936, the new provinces did not correspond to the traditional comarcas or provinícias. The new territories were based on studies made by Amorim Girão, a geographer, who divided continental Portugal into 13 "regiões naturais" (English: natural regions). The provinces were:

- Algarve – which included the totality of the district of Faro;
- Alto Alentejo – including Évora and Portalegre Districts (except the municipality of Ponte de Sor);
- Baixo Alentejo – which included Beja District and the southern half of Setúbal District;
- Beira Alta – the "natural regions" of Beira Alta and Beira Transmontana, that included Guarda District (except for the municipality of Vila Nova de Foz Côa), Viseu District (except for the municipalities of Cinfães, Resende, Armamar, Lamego, São João da Pesqueira and Tabuaço), and the municipalities of Oliveira do Hospital and Tábua (in Coimbra District);
- Beira Baixa – that included Castelo Branco District, the municipality of Mação (in Santarém District) and the municipality of Pampilhosa da Serra (in the district of Coimbra);
- Beira Litoral – in the south containing parts of Beira Baixa Province, including Coimbra District (except for the municipalities of Pampilhosa da Serra, Oliveira do Hospital and Tábua), the northern half of Leiria District, Aveiro District (except for the municipalities of Arouca, Castelo de Paiva, Espinho and Santa Maria da Feira) and the municipality of Ourém (in Santarém District);
- Douro Litoral – including Porto District, the municipalities of Arouca, Castelo de Paiva, Espinho and Santa Maria da Feira (in Aveiro District), and the municipalities of Cinfães and Resende (in Viseu District);
- Estremadura – Lisboa District, that included most of Lisbon, except for the municipalities of Azambuja and Vila Franca de Xira, the northern half or Setúbal District, and the southern half of Leiria District;
- Minho – that included Braga District and Viana do Castelo District;
- Ribatejo – most of the province now belongs to the Santarém District;
- Trás-os-Montes e Alto Douro – the natural regions of Trás-os-Montes and Alto Douro, that included Vila Real District, Bragança District, the municipality of Vila Nova de Foz Côa (in Guarda District) and the municipalities of Armamar, Lamego, São João da Pesqueira and Tabuaço (in the district of Viseu).

These eleven provinces corresponded each to one of the natural regions developed by Amorim Girão, with two exceptions: the natural regions of Trás-os-Montes and Alto Douro and the natural regions of Beira Alta and Beira Transmontana were united respectively into the Trás-os-Montes e Alto Douro Province and the Beira Alta Province. In comparison with the 1835 provinces, the limits of these new provinces did not correspond with the district borders, which were maintained under the jurisdiction of the civil governors.

In 1959, as local governments, the provinces were extinguished. They were only referred to as regional references, while the districts, once again, became the local reference, the juntas distritais and conselhos distritais inheriting the functions of the former provinces.

==== Overseas provinces ====
In the early 20th century, Portugal reclassified its overseas colonies as "overseas provinces" (províncias ultramarinas), making the denomination official in 1951. These provinces were:

- Açores
- Angola
- Cabo Verde
- Guiné
- Estado da Índia
- Macau
- Madeira
- Moçambique
- São Tomé e Príncipe
- Timor

== See also ==
- Administrative divisions of Portugal
- Geography of Portugal
