= Subdivisions of Portugal =

Official political map of Portugal released by the Portuguese government in 2025. Note the lack of a marked national border with Olivenza and its surrounding area, as well as the fact that the borders of both the Alto Alentejo and Alentejo Central regions do not suggest its inclusion into either of those subdivisions.

The subdivisions of Portugal are based on a complex administrative structure. The second-level administrative division, after the 7 regions and 2 autonomous regions, is 308 municipalities (concelhos) which are further subdivided into 3259 civil parishes (freguesias).

== Administrative divisions of Portugal ==
=== Subdivisions of Portugal ===
Subdivision	Total	Mainland	Description
Regions	7	7	Territorial divisions of the continental unitary state
Autonomous Regions	2	0	Sub-territorial divisions comprising Azores and Madeira
Subregions	25	23	Autonomous and sub-regional co-ordination commissions (CCDR)
Municipalities	308	278	Municipal authorities
Civil Parishes	3259	3049	Local area authorities

=== Urban hierarchy ===
In Portugal, urban centers (cities, towns and hamlets) have no legal authority and are social constructs based on a series of institutional functions. In fact, administrative power lies within the extraterritorial municipalities and parishes. These have authority in the constitution and may include various towns within each territory and may have their own constituent assemblies and executives. The town or city, generally, does not correspond to the boundaries of various municipalities, with the exception of the entirely urban municipalities (such as Lisbon, Porto, Funchal, Amadora, Entroncamento and São João da Madeira). The municipality with the most cities is Paredes Municipality which contains four cities.

Sub-division	Total	Mainland	Description
Metropolitan areas	2	2	Agglomerations of metropolitan or urban regions
Intermunicipal communities	21	21	Association of municipal authorities for coordination
Cities	151	141	Population centres
Towns	533	503	Population centres

== Former subdivisions of Portugal ==
Sub-division	Total	Mainland	Description
Province (Medieval)	6	6	1325 territorial administration instituted by Afonso IV
Province (1832)	11	8	1823 reorganization attributed to Mouzinho da Silveira
Province (1936)	11	11	1936 reorganization based on nationalist geographer Amorim Girão
Districts	18	18	1835 reorganization based on prefectures: phased-out in 20th century

== Ancillary divisions ==
=== Statistical ===
Sub-division	Total	Mainland	Description
NUTS 1: National	3	1	Continental Portugal, the Azores and Madeira
NUTS 2: Regions	8	6	Regional Coordination Commissions, and Autonomous Regions
NUTS 3: Subregion	25	23	Metropolitan areas, intermunicipal communities and autonomous regions
LAU 1: Municipal	308	278	Municipalities
LAU 2: Local	3259	3049	Civil Parishes

=== Communication ===
Sub-division	Total	Mainland	Description
Postal codes	9	8	First-digit postal codes
Area codes	51	48	Telephone area codes

== Ambiguity ==
Due to changes throughout history, the Portuguese unitary state has seen a continuous process of centralisation and de-centralisation, resulting in changes to the toponymy of various territorial divisions. Consequently, the many names have been appropriated at different levels to represent alterations to the geographic map of the country. This is particularly the case with the transitive period between the medieval provinces and 19th century Liberal reforms. Further, the influence of the Nationalist movement during the 20th century, resulted in the re-appearance of toponymic names long since abandoned.

The modern unitary state is influenced considerable by names passed between generations, and have been applied and re-applied, resulting in a historical ambiguity in the historical record, where one name may be used for two different areas. As is the case with the following examples:

- Minho: Province / Subregion
- Alto Alentejo: Province / Subregion
- Baixo Alentejo: Province / Subregion
- Douro Litoral: Province / Subregion
- Trás-os-Montes: region / Province
- Estremadura Province: two different ones
- Beira Litoral: postal region, 1936 province

Even between administrative level there several instances where the same name is used to represent a territorial division at the local, municipal or regional level.

== Bibliography ==
- Gwillim Law (1999). "Portugal". Administrative Subdivisions of Countries: A Comprehensive World Reference, 1900 through 1998. US: McFarland & Company. pp. 296+. ISBN 0786407298.
