= 1998 Portuguese regionalisation referendum =

1998 Portuguese regionalization referendum
- 8 November 1998
- Do you agree with implementing administrative regions?

Results
Choice	Votes	%
Yes	1,453,749	36.48%
No	2,530,802	63.52%
Valid votes	3,984,551	95.84%
Invalid or blank votes	172,976	4.16%
Total votes	4,157,527	100.00%
Registered voters/turnout	8,640,026	48.12%

A referendum on creating administrative regions was held in Portugal on 8 November 1998. Two questions were put to voters, the first on implementing the regions, and the second specifically asked whether voters approved of the new region for their area. Both proposals were rejected by wide margins by voters.

== Background ==
The creation of administrative regions in mainland Portugal was an electoral promise of the Socialist Party (PS) in the 1995 legislative election campaign. By 1996, the newly elected leader of the Social Democratic Party (PSD), Marcelo Rebelo de Sousa, defended that regionalisation should be decided by a referendum, while Prime Minister António Guterres wasn't that supportive of the referendum idea. A poll, in April 1996, showed that 53 percent of voters wanted a referendum, with support for regionalisation being 49 percent in favour and 29 percent against.

In May 1996, a new administrative regions law, drafted by the PS and the Communist Party (PCP), was approved by Parliament, despite the boycott from PSD and People's Party (PP) members. A year later, in March 1997, PS and PSD signed a Constitutional review in which a referendum would always have to be mandatory for the creation of administrative regions. In the following year, 1998, Parliament voted on a proposed map to be put on referendum, with only PS and PCP presenting maps, while PSD and PP refused to enter in the debate. A consensus was reached between PS and PCP on the map, which proposed 8 administrative regions in mainland Portugal. A referendum was then called in September 1998 to be held on 8 November of the same year.

== Party positions ==
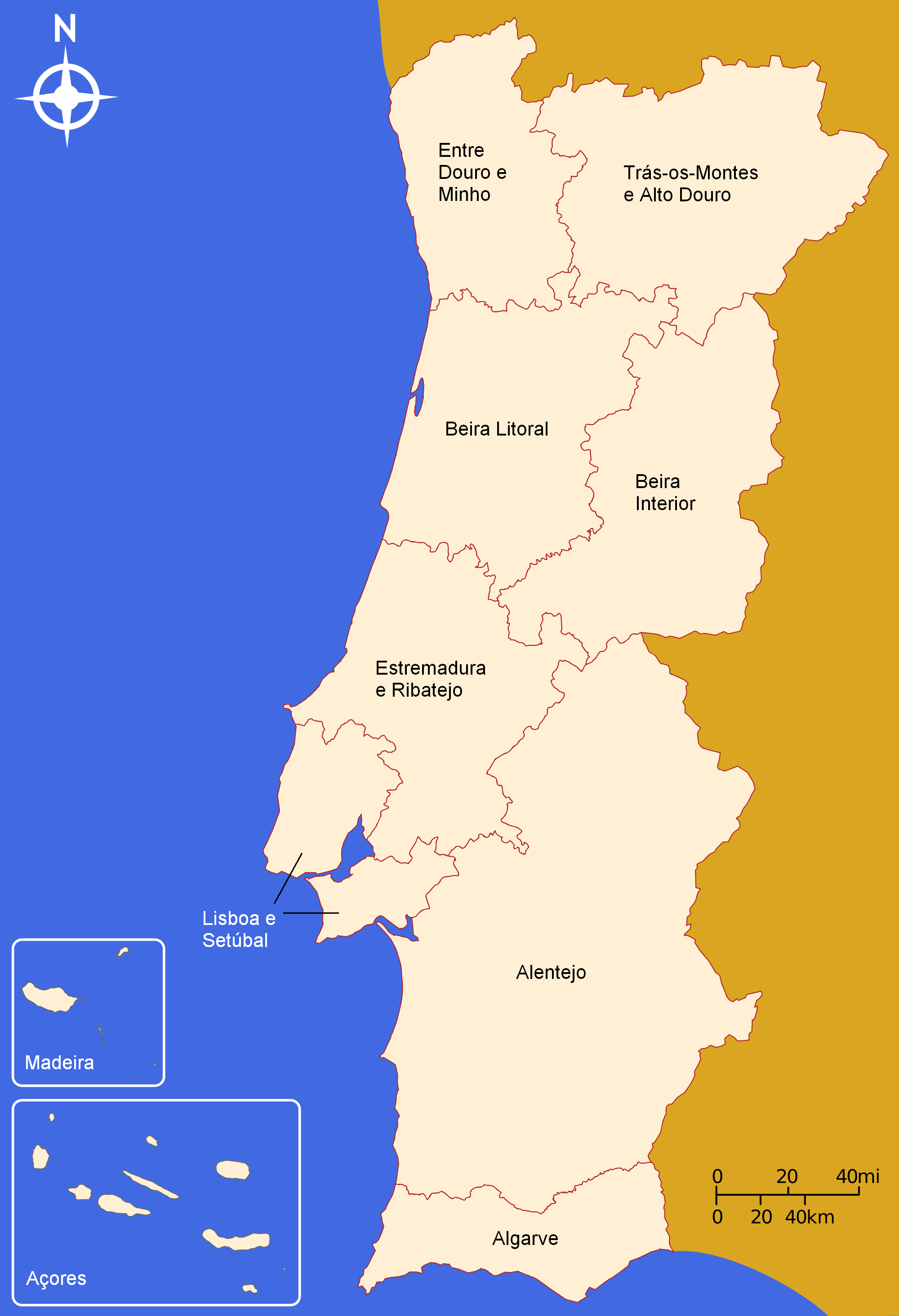
Proposal of eight administrative regions put forward in the referendum

The major parties in Portugal at the time listed with their political positioning and their official answer to the referendum question:

- Left
  - Portuguese Communist Party - YES
  - Ecologist Party "The Greens" - YES
  - Socialist Party - YES
- Right
  - Social Democratic Party - NO
  - People's Party - NO

== Campaign ==
=== Issues ===
The Socialist Party campaigned strongly in favour of the YES vote, defending that regions would help to resolve territorial poverty in Portugal. On the other side, the Social Democrats rejected the proposed map by calling for a NO vote, warning that regionalisation would raise taxes and would just create political jobs.

=== Choices slogans ===
Choice	Original slogan	English translation	Refs
Yes	« Sim, por Portugal. » « A união faz a força. »	"Yes, for Portugal" "Unity is strength."	
No	« Vota Não à regionalização. » « Não e Não. »	"Vote No to regionalization" "No and No."	

== Results ==
Question	For		Against		Invalid/ blank	Total votes	Registered voters	Turnout	Outcome
Question	Votes	%	Votes	%	Invalid/ blank	Total votes	Registered voters	Turnout	Outcome
Do you agree with implementing administrative region?	1,453,749	36.48	2,530,802	63.52	172,976	4,157,527	8,640,026	48.12	Rejected
Do you agree with concretely implementing the administrative region for the area where you live? (Note: Question only given to registered citizens in Continental Portugal)	1,386,718	36.07	2,457,604	63.93	121,531	3,965,853	8,243,030	48.11	Rejected
Source: Nohlen & Stöver, STAPE

Question 1 results (excluding invalid votes)
Yes; 1,453,749 (36.5%)	No; 2,530,802 (63.5%)
▲50%

Question 2 results (excluding invalid votes)
Yes; 1,386,718 (36.1%)	No; 2,457,604 (63.9%)
▲50%

=== Results by region ===
(Results for the second question by Region as proposed in the referendum.)

Proposed region	No		Yes		Turnout
Proposed region	Votes	%	Votes	%	Turnout
Entre Douro e Minho	660,792	59.59%	448,164	40.41%	49.74%
Trás-os-Montes e Alto Douro	129,705	69.85%	58,416	31.05%	45.00%
Beira Litoral	433,463	77.16%	128,338	22.84%	49.56%
Beira Interior	134,725	76.58%	41,206	23.42%	53.00%
Extremadura e Ribatejo	272,553	76.24%	84,928	23.76%	50.66%
Lisbon and Setúbal Region	644,017	58.98%	447,898	41.02%	48.16%
Alentejo	107,655	49.31%	110,657	50.69%	49.39%
Algarve	66,430	50.95%	63,942	49.05%	44.52%
Source: Comissão Nacional de Eleições

== Aftermath ==
Following the referendum results, the Socialist Party (PS) conceded defeat, and Prime Minister António Guterres assumed full responsibility, abandoning the proposal to create administrative regions. Since then, the proposal for a referendum on the introduction of regions has been suggested by several Socialist governments, most recently by António Costa's government in 2023, but without success, given that the opposition of the Social Democratic Party (PSD) to a referendum and the idea of regions remains.
