= Alentejo (disambiguation) =

Alentejo is a geographical, historical and cultural region of Portugal.

Alentejo may also refer to:

== Regions ==
- Alentejo Central
- Alentejo Litoral
- Alentejo Region
- Alentejo Province

== Places ==
- Viana do Alentejo
- Ferreira do Alentejo
- Southwest Alentejo and Vicentine Coast Natural Park

== Others ==
- Alentejan Portuguese
- Alentejo bread
- Alentejo wine
- Cante Alentejano
- Linha do Alentejo
- Rafeiro do Alentejo
- Volta ao Alentejo

== See also ==
- Alto Alentejo (disambiguation)
- Baixo Alentejo (disambiguation)
