= Subdivisions of Alentejo =

Administrative divisions of Alentejo, Portugal

Subdivisions of Alentejo contains the various administrative entities which have been historically referred to as "Alentejo".

- Alto Alentejo Province (1936–1976)
- Baixo Alentejo Province (1936–1976)
- Alentejo Region (NUTS 2 region)
  - Alto Alentejo Subregion (NUTS 3 region), in Alentejo - Portalegre District + some municipalities
  - Baixo Alentejo Subregion (NUTS 3 region), in Alentejo
  - Alentejo Litoral Subregion (NUTS 3 region), in Alentejo
  - Alentejo Central Subregion (NUTS 3 region), in Alentejo
  - Lezíria do Tejo Subregion (NUTS 3 region), in Ribatejo
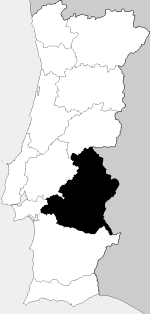
Alto Alentejo Province 1936

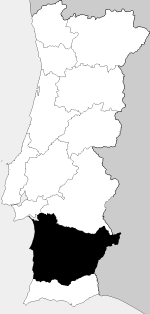
Baixo Alentejo Province 1936

Alentejo Region (NUTS II)

Lezíria do Tejo Subregion

Alto Alentejo Subregion

Baixo Alentejo Subregion

Alentejo Litoral Subregion

Alentejo Central Subregion
