= Douro Province =

Province in Portugal

Douro is a former province of Portugal, established in 1832. The province encompassed parts of the earlier provinces of Beira and Entre-Douro-e-Minho.

In 1835, the province was dissolved as an administrative division and became a grouping of states for statistical purposes and regional reference, covering the districts of Porto, Aveiro and Coimbra.

When the provinces were restored as administrative divisions in 1936, the old province of Douro was not re-established. Instead, the territory was divided into the new provinces of Douro Litoral and Beira Litoral.
