= Beira =

Beira can refer to:

- Beira (mythology), the mother to all the gods and goddesses in the Celtic mythology of Scotland
- Beira, Azores, a small village on São Jorge Island
- Beira (Portugal), the name of a region (and former province) in north-central Portugal; three provinces were later known by the name:
  - Beira Alta Province (extinct)
  - Beira Baixa Province (extinct)
  - Beira Litoral Province (extinct)
- Beira, Mozambique, a port city in Mozambique
- Port of Beira, a Mozambican port
- Beira Railroad Corporation, operating in Mozambique
- Prince of Beira, a title within the Portuguese royal house
- Beira (antelope) (scientific name Dorcatragus megalotis), a species of antelope
- 1474 Beira, an asteroid
- Beira Lake, a lake in Colombo, Sri Lanka
- Beira's Place, domestic violence service, based in Edinburgh, UK
