= Beira Alta =

Beira Alta may refer to:

- Beira Alta Province, a province in the north of Portugal
- Beira Alta (region), one of the 13 regions of continental Portugal identified by geographer Amorim Girão, in a study published between 1927 and 1930
