= Beira (Portugal) =

Name of a region in north-central Portugal

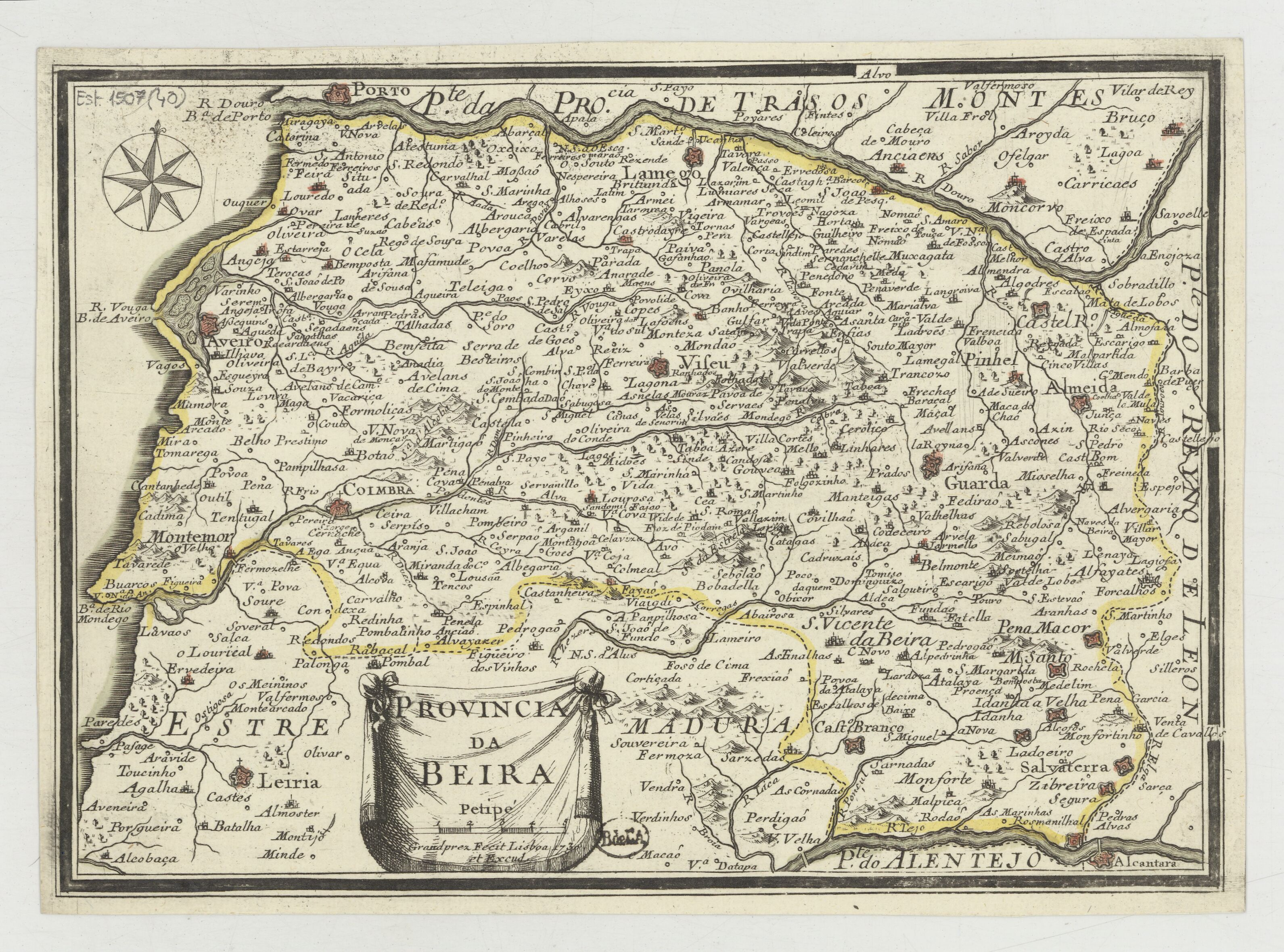
Map of Beira from 1730

Beira (European Portuguese pronunciation: [ˈbɐjɾɐ]) was one of the six traditional provinces or comarcas of Portugal.

The territorial extension is different from that of the area called the Beiras, which refers to three provinces of 1936, Beira Alta, Beira Baixa and Beira Litoral.

== Geography ==
The most important cities within the borders of the traditional province are: Coimbra, Aveiro, Leiria, Viseu, Castelo Branco, Guarda, Figueira da Foz, Covilhã and Pinhel.

The main river is the Mondego; other rivers include the Vouga, Dão, Côa, Zêzere and Paiva. The largest mountain range is Serra da Estrela – Continental Portugal's highest – other ranges being the Caramulo, Marofa, Gardunha, and Bussaco.

== Administrative history ==
After the 15th Century, the new Kingdom of Portugal was divided into six great administrative units, referred to as comarcas. Since the Middle Ages there existed the Beira Province.

=== 1832 ===
In 1832 this province was divided into

- Beira Alta
- Beira Baixa

=== 1936 ===
In 1936 these were divided among three provinces, one of which contained area that was not included in Beira Province:

- Beira Alta - "natural" regions of Beira Alta and Beira Transmontana
- Beira Baixa
- Beira Litoral

Sometimes collectively referred to as the Beiras.

=== 1976 ===
In 1976 the provinces were abolished leaving only the 18 districts.

- Beira Alta Province:
  - Guarda District
  - Viseu District
- Beira Baixa Province:
  - Coimbra District
  - Castelo Branco District
- Beira Litoral Province:
  - Aveiro District
  - Coimbra District
  - North of Leiria District

1976 postal code areas divide the region in

- Beira Interior
- Beira Litoral (postal region)

=== 1998 ===
Law 19/98 of 1998 divided the area into

- Beira Litoral
- Beira Interior

=== 2011 ===
The current Centro Region of Portugal covers roughly the same area. Oeste Subregion, part of Estremadura, is the major exception. Among its twelve subregions three contain the name "Beira":

- Beira Interior Norte,
- Beira Interior Sul and
- Cova da Beira

The name also is contained in the name of many small towns and villages in the area, e.g. Moimenta da Beira, Celorico da Beira, Aguiar da Beira, Mondim da Beira etc.

=== Maps ===
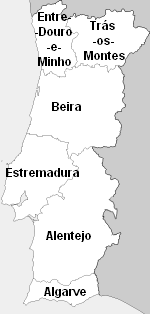
Medieval Beira

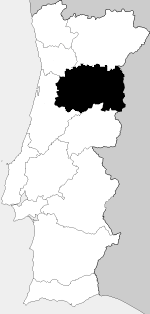
1936 Beira Alta

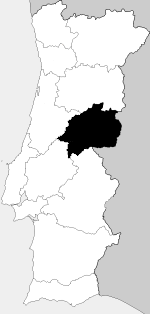
1936 Beira Baixa

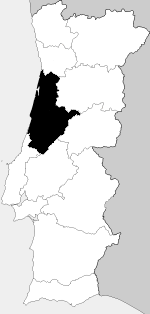
1936 Beira Litoral

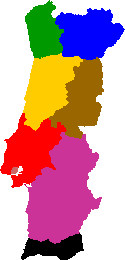
postal code regions yellow Beira Litoral, brown Beira Interior

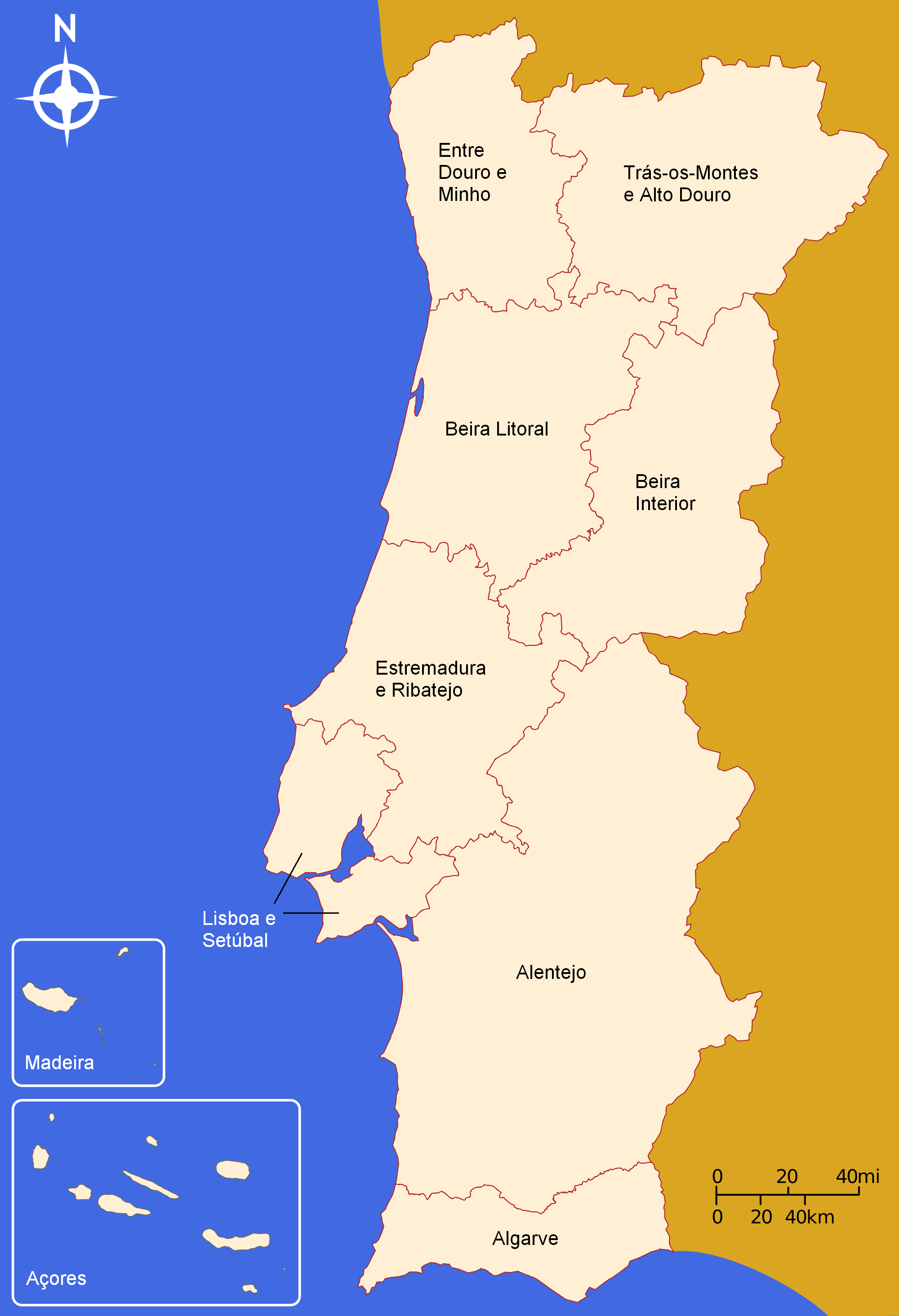
1998 Law - Beira Litoral and Beira Interior

Centro Region

Beira Interior Norte

Beira Interior Sul

Cova da Beira

== See also ==
- Centro, Portugal
- Beira, Mozambique
- Prince of Beira, a former royal title
- Beiras wine region
- Administrative divisions of Portugal
