= Geography of Póvoa de Varzim =

Coordinates: 41°22′59″N 8°46′00″W

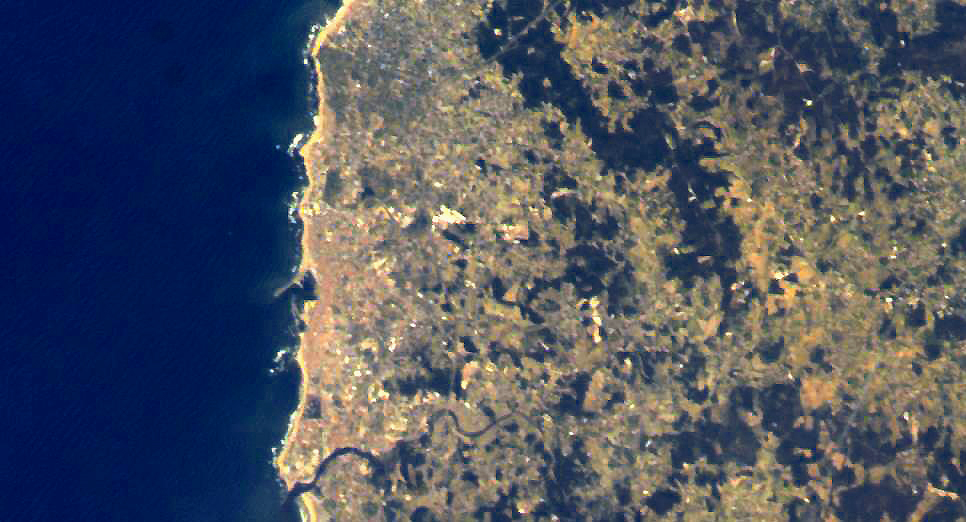
Satellite image of Póvoa de Varzim. Cape Santo André is up north and Ave River in the south. The great dark spot in the middle is the Serra de Rates forest area.

Póvoa de Varzim, with an area of 82.06 square kilometres, lies between the Cávado and Ave Rivers, or, from a wider perspective, halfway between the Minho and Douro Rivers on the northern coast of Portugal (also known as Costa Verde - Green Coast). Although in administrative reforms of 1936, the city was integrated in Douro Litoral (with which it shares cultural and historical traditions), the case for such an administrative integration is arguable, because Póvoa de Varzim is found in a transition region (in this case, between Douro Litoral and the old province of the Minho). It has characteristic Minho traditions, historical and demographic bounds with several towns and villages in the region, religiously it is part of Braga archdiocese, and due to that it is perhaps preferable to recognize Póvoa as part of the old region, favouring more Entre-Douro-e-Minho, given its central geographic position in this region.

The city is limited to the north by the municipality of Esposende, to the northeast by Barcelos, to the east by Vila Nova de Famalicão, and to the south by Vila do Conde. To the west, it has a shoreline on the Atlantic Ocean.

== Physical geography ==
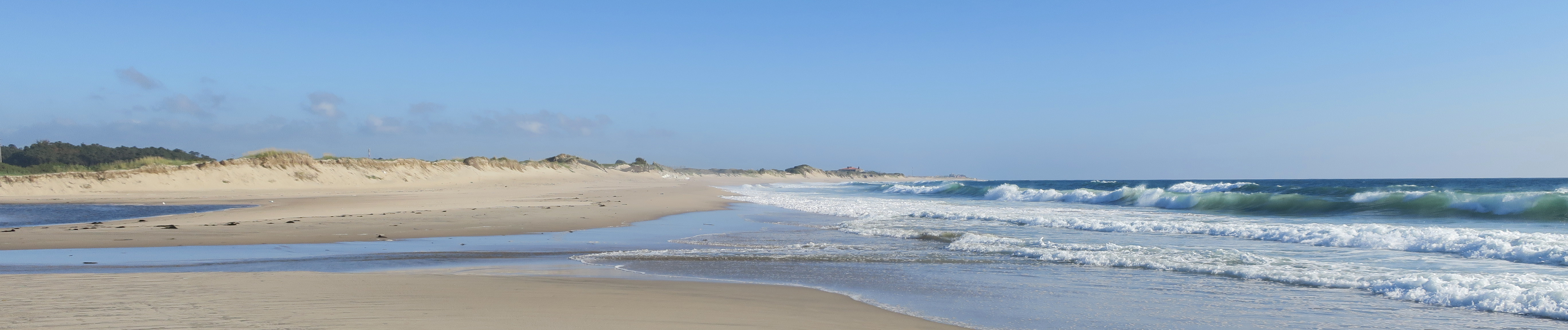
The Primary Dune System of Póvoa de Varzim as seen from Rio Alto estuary. This area extends from Rio Alto rivulet to Cape Santo André in the Northwestern coast of Póvoa de Varzim for an extension of over 6 kilometers; 20,000 feet. Beachfront construction, erosion and, historically, agriculture are its major threats.

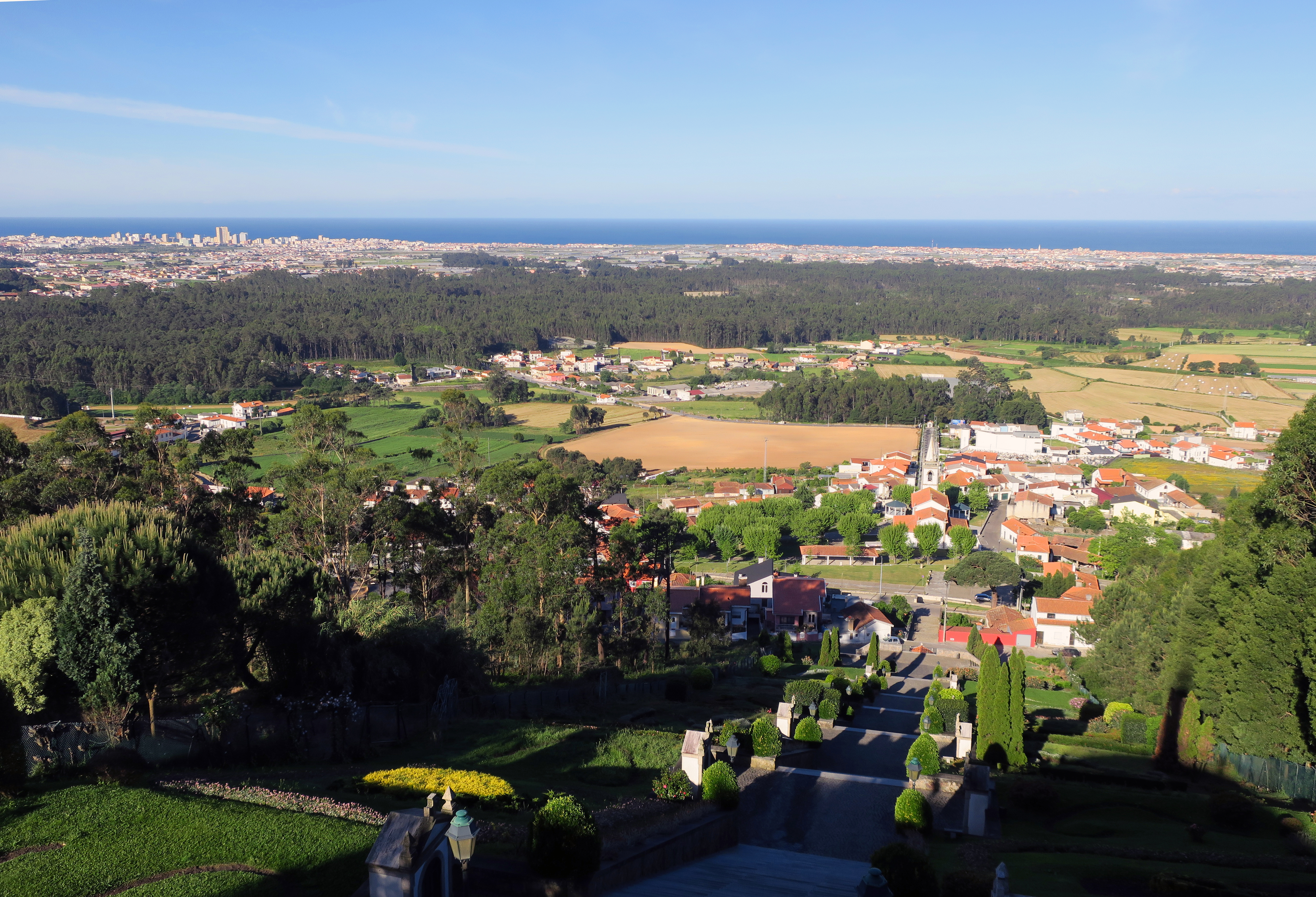
The coastal plain. The city and its suburbs are surrounded by bouça forests.

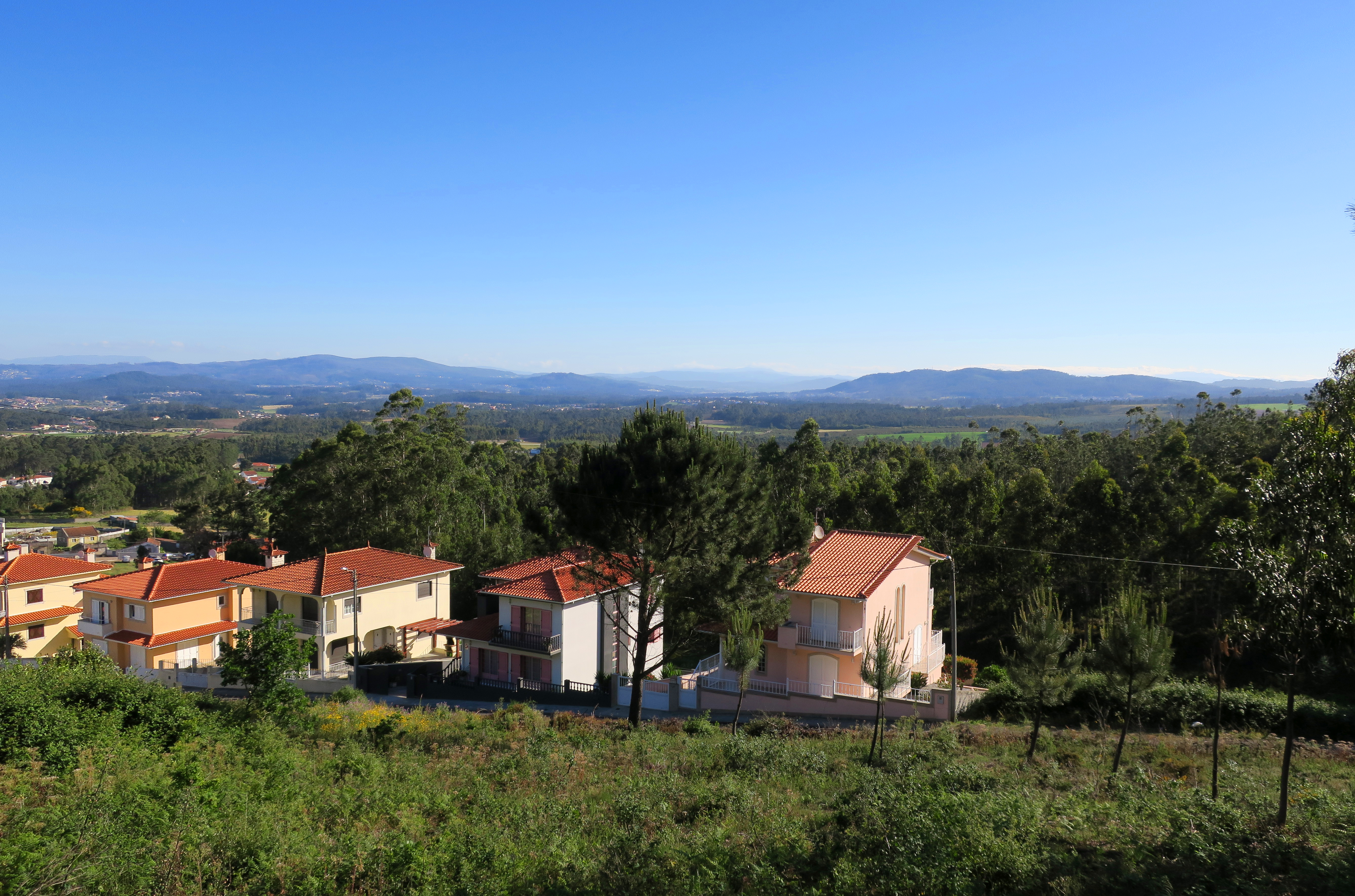
The green inland hills has higher pluviosity and lower maritime influence.

The rocky cliffs, common features down from the estuary of Minho River, disappear in Póvoa de Varzim giving way to a coastal plain.

The plain originates from an old marine plateau conferring a sandy soil to the lands that cross the coasts of the parishes of Póvoa, A Ver-o-Mar, Navais to Aguçadoura and Estela, and forming sand dunes, mainly in Northern Aguçadoura.

Wandering along the coast one discerns Cape Santo André which is, possibly, the Avarus Promontory referred by Ptolemy, geographer of Ancient Greece, in the territory of the Callaici.

The municipality is of 190 meters (620 feet) above sea-level. The peak of Saint Félix (202 meters; 663 feet) and of Cividade (155 m; 509 ft) are easily visible rising above the landscape. Despite the modest rise, the expanse of the plain makes these easy reference points on the horizon. The mountain chain known as Serra de Rates divides the municipality in two distinctive areas: the coastal plain gives way to hills where the forests become more abundant and the soils have less sea influence. In this landscape dominated by the plain and low hills, only the hill of Corga da Soalheira (150 m; 490 ft), in the interior, is easily recognizable.

Imprisoned between the sea and the mountain range, the city dominates the coastal plain. In the south, there is urban continuity with Vila do Conde, another city and municipality, establishing itself as the southern limit.

The hydrography of the municipality has no large rivers, but abundant small water courses exist due to the relief of the coastal plain.

Some of these water courses are permanent, such the Este River, which feeds into the Ave River. The Esteiro River's source is at the base of Mount Cividade and it empties at the beach of Aver-o-Mar while the Alto River's source is at the base of Mount São Félix and it reaches the Atlantic at Rio Alto Beach. The land is well irrigated, the appearance of springs and wells are very common, given that, often, underground water is close to the surface.

== Climate ==
The region possesses a local microclimate, being privileged that it is considered the region least subject to frosts in all Northern Portugal due to the winter winds that, normally, blow from South and Southwest.

North winds (known as Nortadas) arise, typically, in the summer after midday and like the summer fogs, these refresh the air and are characteristic of Póvoa - a climate that is classified as maritime temperate. The municipality has gentle summers and mild winters, with average temperatures oscillating between 12.5 and 15 degrees Celsius. The annual precipitation varies between 1200 and 1400 mm.

== Environment ==
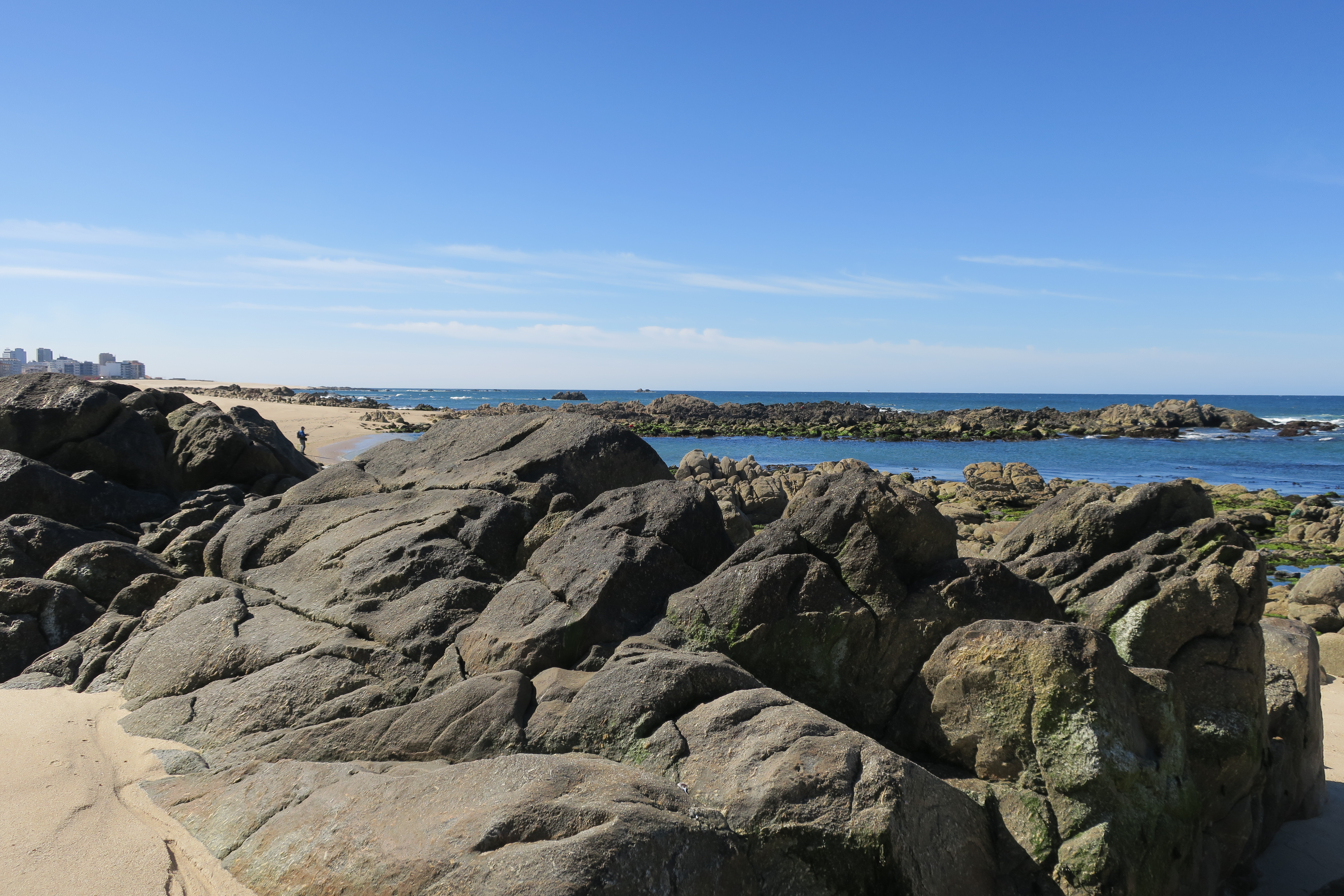
Granite gneiss. The gneiss forms headlands and islets which submerge during high tide.

The forest areas suffer from strong demographic pressure and intensive agriculture. Forests are still important in parishes surrounded by the Serra de Rates, whose flora is distinguished by the Pedunculate Oak or the European Holly. In the 18th century, the monks of Tibães planted pinewood, which today characterizes the civil parish of Estela. In the past the Atlantic forest predominated, with trees from medium to great size, such as oaks, ash trees, hazels, strawberry trees, holm oak, and alders.

The rocks throughout the entire coastline are the true fisheries of clams, fish and seaweed. These rocks and the dunes are ecosystems that possess an important ecological wealth, but are threatened by holiday-makers, dune-based sports and coastal constructions.

Póvoa de Varzim and other cities of the Greater Porto area have a strategical environment plan for Greater Porto - the Futuro Sustentável ("Sustainable Future") - which plans to understand the problems, and to create solutions and new environmental projects for Greater Porto that meet the desires of its citizens.

Beyond the urban areas, the City Park (800,000 m^{2}) will be extended from the A28 motorway and Pedreira Lagoon will have densely forested areas, open spaces, hills, a new lake and sports area (with exception of the sports area, the project is still a proposal). The Anjo's Urban Green, of environmental importance to the city - given that it is a native woodland area with pedunculate oaks, will be complemented by a rural park in the near future.
