= Estremadura Province =

Estremadura Province may refer to:

- Estremadura Province (historical), Portugal
- Estremadura Province (1936–1976), Portugal
