= Postal codes in Portugal =

The Portuguese postal code (código postal) is formed by four digits, a hyphen, then three digits, followed by a postal location of up to 25 characters in capitals.

Avenida Marconi 4C
1000-205 Lisboa[1]

Postal codes are given at the building block level and also to designated addresses with high volumes of mail. The first digit designates one of nine postal regions; the following two digits designate postal distribution centers; the fourth digit is 0 if it belongs to a capital of municipality, 5 if not, or any other digit if it is a designated address; the last three digits sort building blocks and designated addresses. The more important the city, the more rounded is the number formed by the first four digits.

== Previous formats ==
Prior to 1976, only Lisbon had used a system, of six zones (Lisboa 1 to Lisboa 6).

Avenida Padre Manuel da Nobrega 14, 2º Esq. 
Lisboa 1[2]

In 1976, a national postal code system was introduced, with a four-digit structure, and designated addresses added "CODEX" (abbreviation of código extraordinário) to the postal location:

Instituto de Hidráulicas e Recursos Hídricos
Rua dos Bragas
4099 Porto CODEX[3]

== Postal regions ==
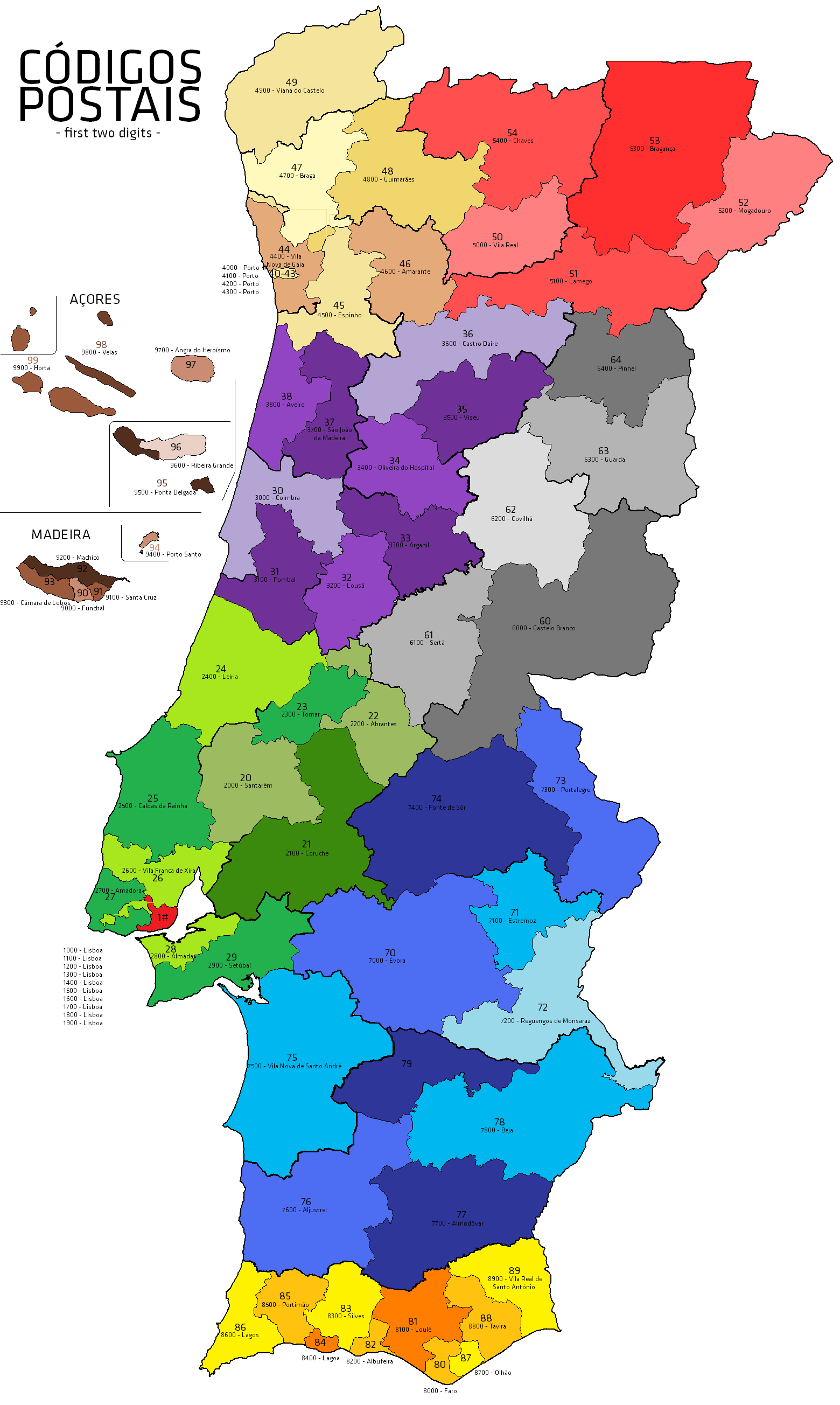
1###: Red; 2###: Green; 3###: Purple; 4###: Cream; 5###: Pink; 6###: Grey; 7###: Blue; 8###: Yellow; 9###: Brown

Postal regions (first digit of postal code):

1. (red) - City of Lisbon
2. (green) - Estremadura e Ribatejo: Lisbon metropolitan area (except City of Lisbon), Santarém District and parts of Leiria District
3. (purple) - Beira Litoral: Coimbra and Aveiro districts and part of Leira and Viseu districts
4. (cream) - Minho e Douro Litoral: Viana do Castelo, Braga District and Porto District and part of Viseu and Vila Real Districts
5. (pink) - Trás-os-Montes e Alto Douro: Bragança District, most of Vila Real District and northern parts of Viseu District and Guarda District
6. (grey) - Beira Interior: Castelo Branco District and Guarda District and northern tip of Portalegre District
7. (blue) - Alentejo: Beja District and Évora District and parts of Portalegre District and Setúbal District
8. (yellow) - Algarve: Faro District
9. (brown) - Madeira Islands and Azores

Note that, although the regions' names are connected to the (extinct) provinces of Portugal of 1936, their limits (with the exception of Algarve) are not exactly the same.

People can also search for postal codes at the CTT Correios website.
