= Alentejo Province =

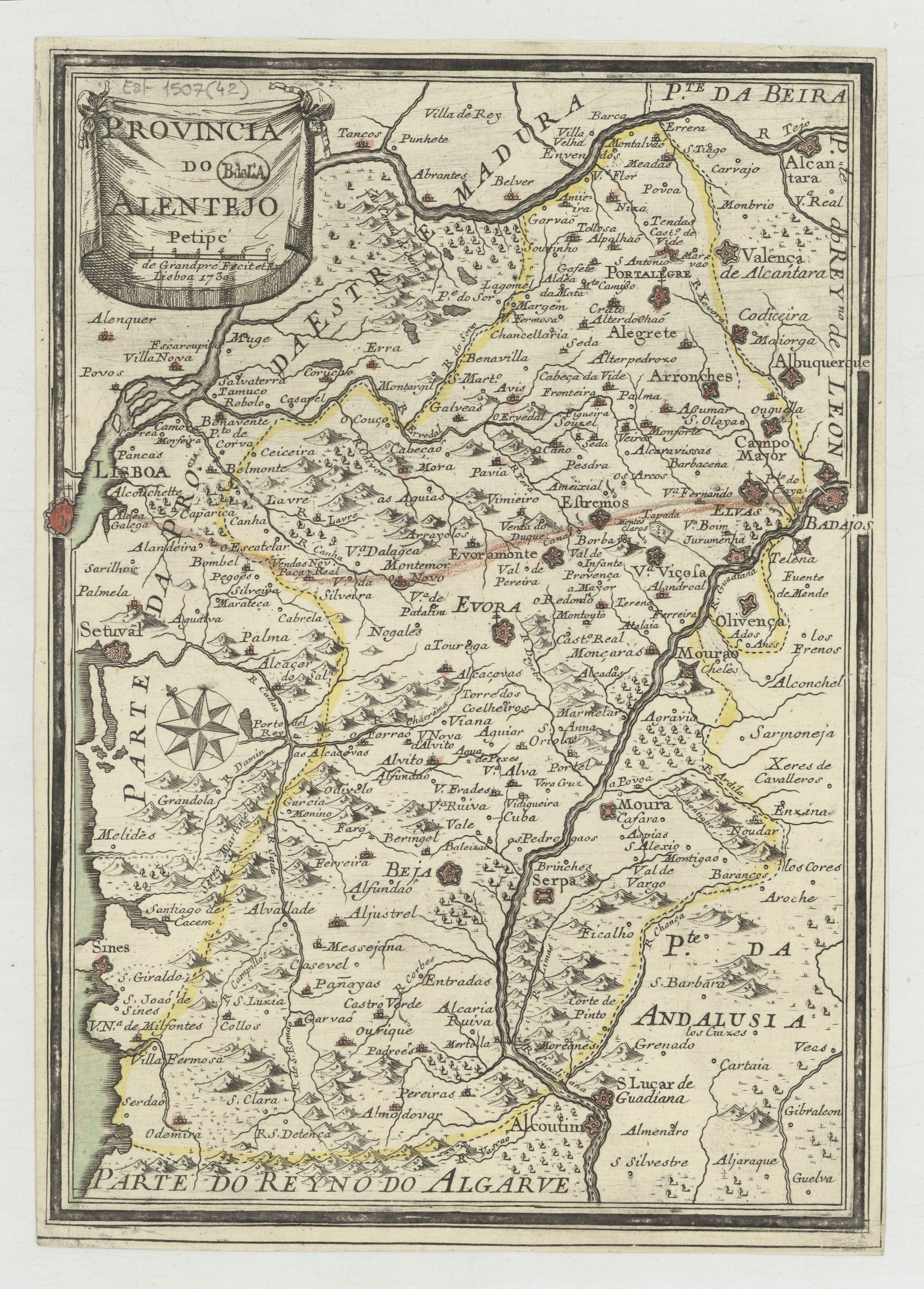
Map of Alentejo from 1730

Alentejo Province (European Portuguese pronunciation: [ɐlẽˈtɛʒu]) is one of the six historical provinces of Portugal. The province took its name from the Portuguese além Tejo, meaning "Beyond the (River) Tagus". It covers the historical and cultural region Alentejo. It was created in 1832, and was divided into Alto Alentejo Province and Baixo Alentejo Province in 1933.
