= Baixo Alentejo =

Baixo Alentejo may refer to:

- Baixo Alentejo Province (1936-1976)
- Baixo Alentejo (intermunicipal community) (NUTS 3 region)

== See also ==
- Alto Alentejo (disambiguation)
- Alentejo
