= Alentejo =

Region of Portugal

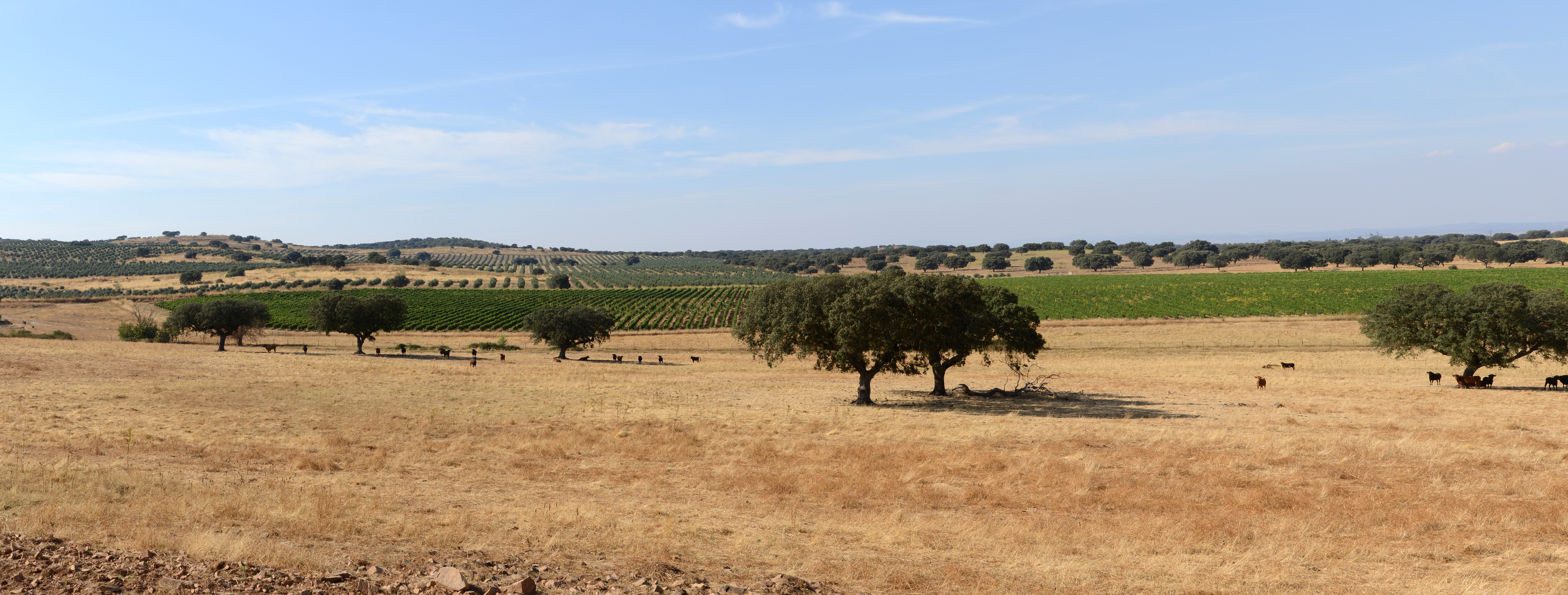
- Typical landscape of Alentejo. The trees in the foreground are cork oaks (Quercus suber), together with the remains of a cut wheat field. The second and third images are vineyards (Vitis vinifera) and olive trees (Olea europea). Wheat, cork, olive oil, and wine are the most important commercial products of Alentejo.

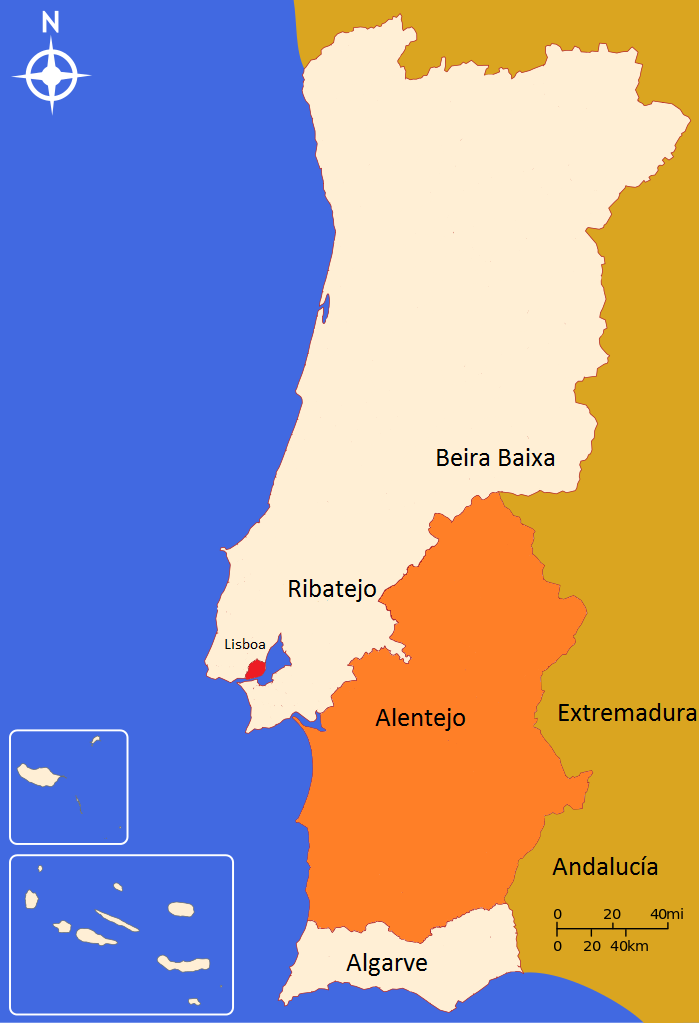
- Location of Alentejo
- Country: Portugal
- Region: Alentejo

Alentejo (/ˌælənˈteɪʒoʊ/ AL-ən-TAY-zhoh, UK also /-ʒuː/ -zhoo, Portuguese: [ɐlẽˈtɛʒu]) is a geographical, historical, and cultural region of south–central and southern Portugal. In Portuguese, its name means "beyond the Tagus" (além do Tejo).

Alentejo includes the regions of Alto Alentejo and Baixo Alentejo. It corresponds to the districts of Beja, Évora, Portalegre, and Alentejo Litoral. Its main cities are Évora, Beja, Sines, Serpa, Estremoz, Elvas, and Portalegre.

It has borders with Beira Baixa in the north, with Spain (Andalucia and Extremadura) in the east, Algarve in the south, and the Atlantic Ocean, Ribatejo, and Estremadura in the west.

Alentejo is a region known for its traditional polyphonic singing groups, similar to those found in Tuscany, Corsica, and elsewhere.

== History ==
In the 19th century, the comarca of Alentejo became the Alentejo Province, divided into upper (Alto Alentejo Province) and lower (Baixo Alentejo Province) designations. The modern NUTS statistical region, Alentejo Region, was expropriated from the medieval provinces and historical territories of Estremadura Province (specifically the 1936 portions of the Ribatejo).

The term Entre-Tejo-e-Guadiana has become obsolete; it referred to roughly the same land area between the Tagus and the Guadiana rivers as part of the Kingdom of Portugal.

== Geography ==
=== Capitals ===
The three historic capitals of Alentejo—Évora, Beja, and Portalegre—are the region's principal urban, administrative, and cultural centers, each reflecting a distinct stage in Alentejo's historical development. Évora, of Roman origin, became the political, religious, and cultural capital of the region and is renowned for its UNESCO World Heritage-listed historic center. Beja, the ancient Roman Pax Julia, played a key role during the Roman and Islamic periods and later emerged as the principal city of the Baixo Alentejo, with enduring importance in agriculture and military affairs. Portalegre, located on the slopes of the Serra de São Mamede, developed as the main urban center of the Alto Alentejo, distinguished by its architectural heritage, tapestry industry, and strategic position near the Spanish border.

=== Dimensions ===
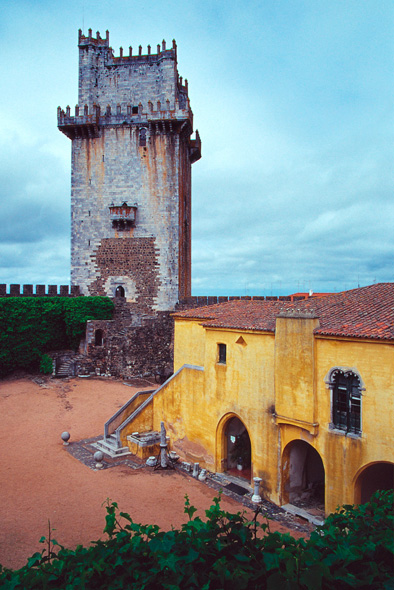
Beja, the capital of Lower Alentejo, with its 12th-century castle and the tallest keep on the Iberian Peninsula

Évora, the capital of the Central Alentejo, with its Roman temple

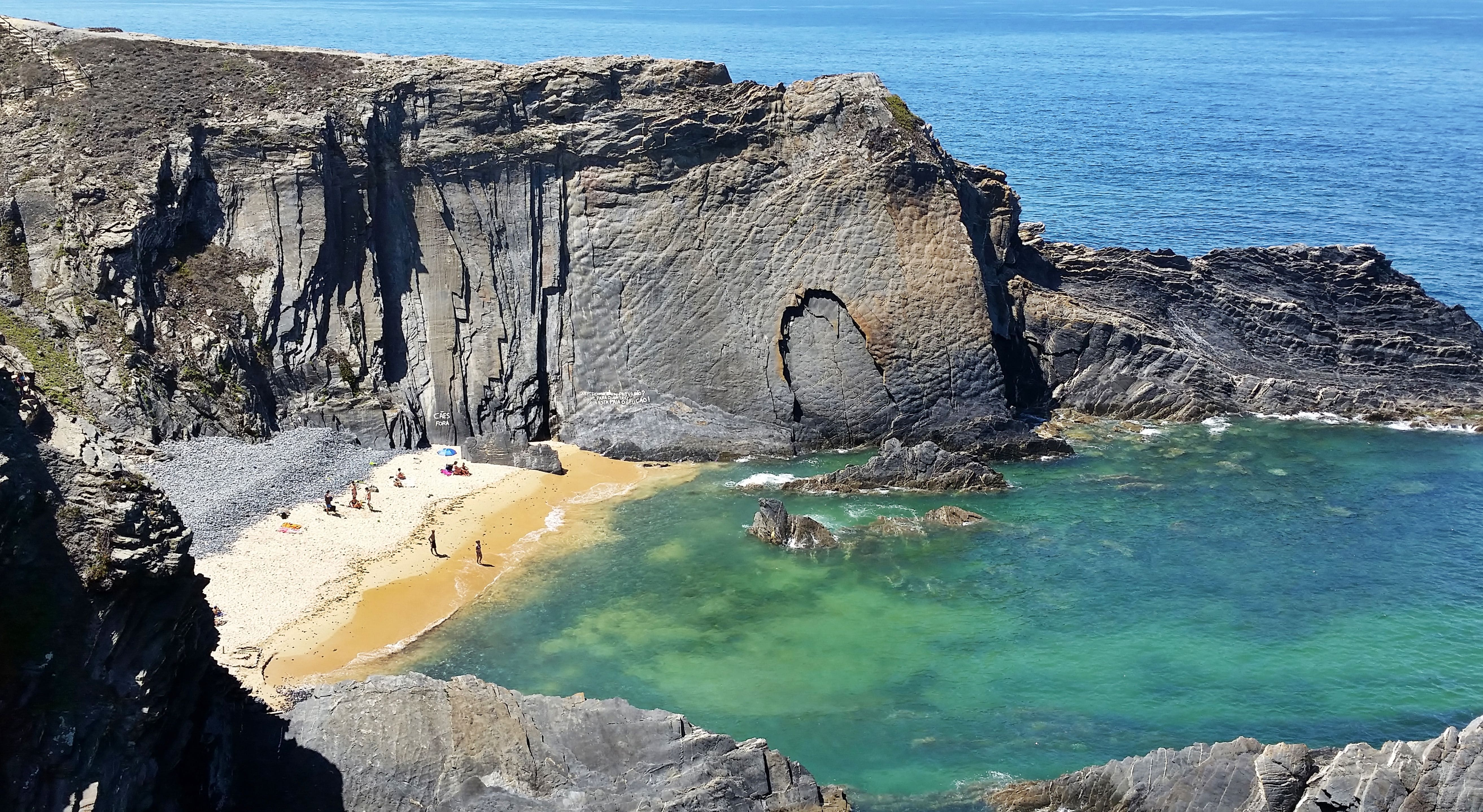
Coastal Alentejo

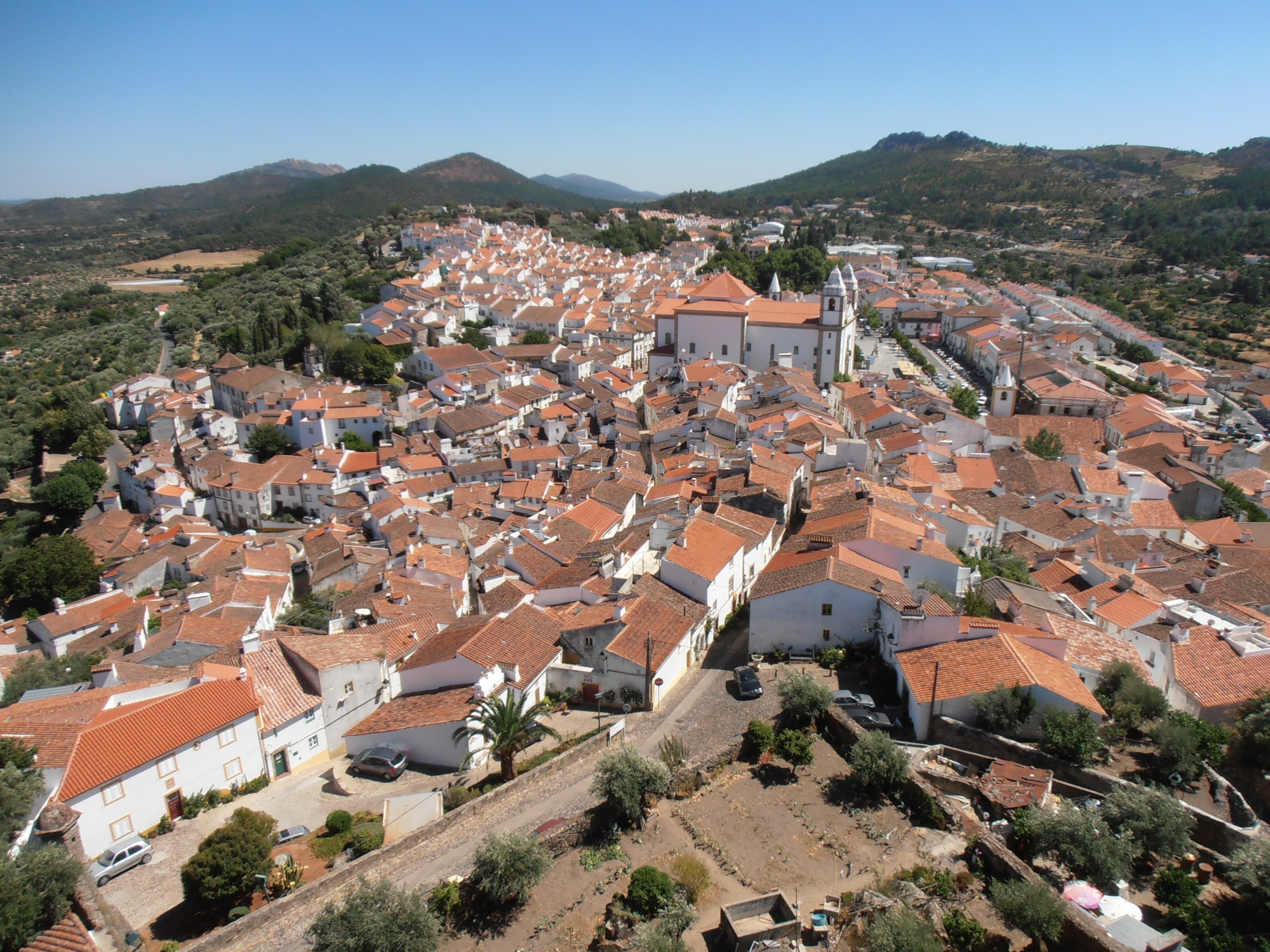
Castelo de Vide, Alentejo

Alentejo's area extends to 27,272 square kilometres (10,530 square miles) (29.6% of the country) and has a population of 537,556 (5.1% of the country). Excluding Ponte de Sor, its area is 26,432 km^{2} (10,205 sq mi) and its population 520,834. The population density of Alentejo is 19.1 per square kilometre (49/sq mi).

=== Topography ===
Topographically, the countryside varies from the open rolling plains of the south of Alentejo to the granite hills that border Spain in the northeast. To feed the water needs of this considerable area, a number of public dams have been constructed, most notably the Alqueva Dam.

The landscape is primarily one of soft rolling hills and plains, with conspicuous shrubs and the native cork oaks and holly/holm oaks, the established olive trees and grapevines, as well as eucalyptus trees and some native trees. Managed oak landscapes are locally known as montados.

In the north, traditional economic activity may be more livestock-based as typified by cattle, sheep, and pig (both white and black) farming. To the south, agriculture may be more predominant.

=== Biome ===
Parque Natural da Serra de São Mamede, a nature park area located to the east of Portalegre, includes medieval villages.

In the south, near Mértola, there is another nature park area, named Parque Natural do Vale Guadiana. This is more sparsely inhabited than the former.

To the west, the coastal strip that runs from the port of Sines down to Cape St. Vincent comprises the Southwest Alentejo and Vicentine Coast Natural Park.

=== Climate ===
The Alentejo region has a Mediterranean climate, typically warm-to-hot and dry for a large part of the year, with summer temperatures regularly reaching up to 40 °C (104 °F), while winters are relatively mild and wet. The climate is not uniform throughout the region, however: mid-summer temperatures in coastal areas are usually much lower (often around 25 °C (77 °F)) than inland ones (which frequently hover around 33 to 35.5 °C (91.4 to 95.9 °F)). This resembles the contrast between Casablanca and the Moroccan interior, where the presence of the nearby Atlantic Ocean gives rise to marked temperature differences between coastal and even nearby inland zones.

Usually, the warmest temperatures can be found in the southernmost inland parts of the region, along the Guadiana valley between Mértola and Juromenha, particularly in the areas close to Moura. However, the hottest days tend to deviate from the usual pattern and will arise when the winds are east or southeast and very hot air with temperatures reaching 25 °C (77 °F) or more at 850 mbar level (usually around 1,500 m.a.s.l.) enter Iberia from Africa. If the winds are strong enough, the deep and low-lying valley of the Sado river becomes extremely warm by European standards. Places like Alvalade do Sado and Alcácer do Sal and others below 100 metres (330 ft) can reach 45 °C (113 °F) under extreme circumstances, and 40 °C (104 °F) in the summer is regularly reached, despite the fact that they are relatively close to the coast.

The highest temperature ever recorded in Portugal was measured on 1 August 2003 in Amareleja and reached 47.4 °C (117.3 °F). The average daytime maximum temperatures reach 35 to 36 °C (95 to 97 °F) in July and August near Moura, 33 to 34 °C (91 to 93 °F) in the Sado Valley (and other inland valleys away from the coast). Many parts, however, are above 200 or 300 metres (660 or 980 ft) altitude, which leads to lower average temperatures also in summer. It is very likely that the Guadiana river valley away from the coast is one of the hottest on average in Europe.

Portugal, including the Alentejo region, is affected by climate change and average temperatures are clearly on the rise.

Sines

Climate chart (precipitation, max. and min. temperature)
J	F	M	A	M	J	J	A	S	O	N	D
73 15 9	57 16 10	39 17 11	49 17 12	32 18 14	7.9 20 16	2.9 22 17	2 22 17	19 22 16	60 20 15	85 18 12	84 16 11
- █ Average max. and min. temperatures in °C
- █ Precipitation totals in mm
Imperial conversion
J	F	M	A	M	J	J	A	S	O	N	D
2.9 59 49	2.2 60 50	1.5 62 51	1.9 63 53	1.3 65 56	0.3 68 60	0.1 71 62	0.1 71 62	0.8 71 62	2.4 68 58	3.4 64 54	3.3 61 51
- █ Average max. and min. temperatures in °F
- █ Precipitation totals in inches

Évora

Climate chart (precipitation, max. and min. temperature)
J	F	M	A	M	J	J	A	S	O	N	D
61 13 6	52 15 7	44 18 9	55 19 10	47 23 12	17 28 15	4.1 31 17	8.2 31 17	32 28 16	84 22 13	88 17 10	95 14 7
- █ Average max. and min. temperatures in °C
- █ Precipitation totals in mm
Imperial conversion
J	F	M	A	M	J	J	A	S	O	N	D
2.4 56 42	2 58 44	1.7 64 47	2.2 66 49	1.8 73 53	0.6 82 59	0.2 88 62	0.3 88 63	1.3 82 61	3.3 72 56	3.4 63 49	3.7 57 45
- █ Average max. and min. temperatures in °F
- █ Precipitation totals in inches

Amareleja

Climate chart (precipitation, max. and min. temperature)
J	F	M	A	M	J	J	A	S	O	N	D
54 14 4	46 16 5	38 19 6	56 21 8	44 24 10	25 30 13	3.2 34 16	1.8 34 16	26 30 14	59 24 11	66 19 7	82 15 5
- █ Average max. and min. temperatures in °C
- █ Precipitation totals in mm
Imperial conversion
J	F	M	A	M	J	J	A	S	O	N	D
2.1 58 39	1.8 61 40	1.5 66 42	2.2 69 46	1.7 76 50	1 85 56	0.1 94 60	0.1 93 60	1 87 57	2.3 75 52	2.6 65 45	3.2 59 42
- █ Average max. and min. temperatures in °F
- █ Precipitation totals in inches

== Education ==
By acceptable standards of a developed country, the illiteracy rate in the region may still be surprisingly high among those older than sixty, in contrast with younger generations. The rate of coverage of pre-primary education is among the highest in the country.

Institutions of higher education include:

- Polytechnic Institute of Beja
- Instituto Politécnico de Portalegre
- University of Évora

== Economy ==
The area is commonly known as the "breadbasket" of Portugal, a region of vast open countryside with undulating plains and rich fertile soil. With very few exceptions, all the major towns are mainly reliant on agriculture, livestock, and forestry. There are several types of traditional cheeses, wines, and smoked hams and sausages made in the Alentejo region, including Queijo Serpa, Queijo de Évora, and Queijo de Nisa (PDO cheeses); Vinho do Alentejo and Vinho do Redondo (wines); and presunto (smoked ham). Marble, cork, olive oil, and mining industries are other important activities in the region and tourism is expected to have growth potential. The Alqueva Dam is an important irrigation and hydroelectricity generation facility that supports part of Alentejo's economy.

The region is home to the world's most important area for the growing of cork. Cork oak, known in Portugal as "sobreiro", has been grown commercially in the region for the past 300 years, with the areas between the trees typically given over to grazing, or on the more productive soils, to the growing of citrus fruit, vines or olives. As a consequence, a uniquely rich and varied ecosystem has developed. The bark of the cork oak is still harvested by teams of men using locally made hand-axes. No mechanical method has yet been invented that will allow the harvest to be achieved as effectively. The stripping of the bark is performed only in midsummer, when the bark can be removed more easily. The cork oak is the only tree known that will allow this regular stripping of bark without damage. The harvest of one mature tree provides sufficient bark to produce about 4,000 wine bottle corks. The industry provides employment for about 60,000 workers.

== See also ==
- Alentejo wine
- Cante Alentejano (vocal music genre)
- Marvão, a historic municipality
- Antas do Olival da Pêga
