= Trás-os-Montes (disambiguation) =

Trás-os-Montes is a geographical, historical and cultural region of Portugal

Trás-os-Montes may also refer to:

== Places ==
=== Cape Verde ===
- Trás os Montes, Cape Verde, a village in the municipality of Tarrafal, on the island of Santiago

=== Portugal ===
- Trás-os-Montes Province, the 15th century historical comarca, later province/prefecture, of Portugal
- Trás-os-Montes e Alto Douro, based on Amorim Girão's published analysis, but modified by the 1936 Estado Novo government
- Alto Trás-os-Montes, a former NUTS III subregion of Portugal
- Terras de Trás-os-Montes, an intermunicipal community and NUTS III subregion of Portugal

== Other ==
- Trás-os-Montes, a steamship built in 1906 as Bülow, renamed Trás-os-Montes in 1916, and renamed Nyassa in 1924
- Trás-os-Montes (film), a 1976 film by Portuguese directors António Reis and Margarida Cordeiro
- Trás-os-Montes wine
