= Minho Province =

Former Portuguese province (1936–1976)

Coordinates: 41.8184°N 8.4155°W

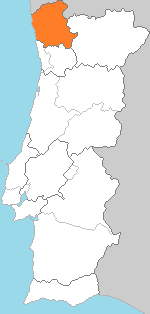
Location of the region of Minho in Portugal

Minho (Portuguese: [ˈmiɲu]) was a former province in Portugal, established in 1936 and dissolved in 1976. It consisted of 23 municipalities, with its capital in the city of Braga. Today, the area would include the districts of Braga and Viana do Castelo. Minho has substantial Celtic influences and shares many cultural traits with neighbouring Galicia, in northwestern Spain. The region was part of the Roman Province and early Germanic medieval Kingdom of Gallaecia. Historical remains of Celtic Minho include Briteiros Iron Age Hillfort, the largest Gallaecian native stronghold in the Entre Douro e Minho region, in north Portugal. The University of Minho, founded in 1973, takes its name from the former province.

Although the province no longer exists, its name is still commonly used to refer to the region, as its origin vastly predates its official institution as an administrative region, and its people have a unique culture and way to be.

Minho is famous as being the origin of the soup caldo verde and Vinho Verde, a wine particular to the region.

== Historic cities ==
- Braga (Bracara Augusta)
- Guimarães (old Vimaranes)
- Viana do Castelo, formerly Viana do Lima
- Barcelos
- Ponte de Lima
- Valença

== See also ==
Media related to Minho at Wikimedia Commons Minho travel guide from Wikivoyage

- Minho (river)
- Gallaecia
- Ave (intermunicipal community)
- Peneda-Gerês National Park
