= Braga District =

District of Portugal

District of Braga Distrito de Braga (Portuguese)
- District
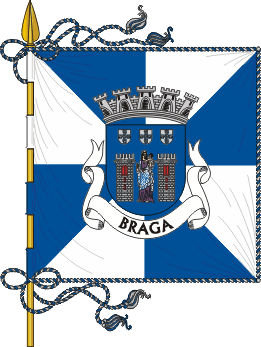
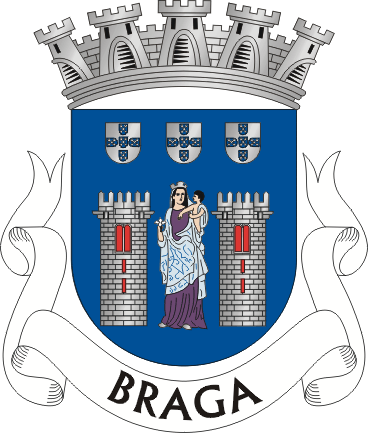
- Flag Coat of arms

- Location of Braga within continental Portugal
- Country: Portugal
- Region: Northern Portugal
- Historical province: Entre Douro e Minho
- Number of municipalities: 14
- Number of parishes: 371
- Capital: Braga

Area
  - Total: 2,673 km^{2} (1,032 sq mi)

Population
  - Total: 831,368
  - Density: 311.0/km^{2} (805.5/sq mi)
- ISO 3166 code: PT-03
- No. of parliamentary representatives: 19

Braga District (Portuguese: Distrito de Braga [ˈbɾaɣɐ]) is a district in the northwest of Portugal. The district capital is the city of Braga, and it is bordered by the district of Viana do Castelo in the north, Vila Real in the east, Galicia (a Spanish autonomous community) in the northeast and Porto in the south. Its area is 2,673 km^{2} (1,032 sq mi) and it has a population of 831,368. It takes its name from the Bracarii, a Celtic tribe.

== Municipalities ==
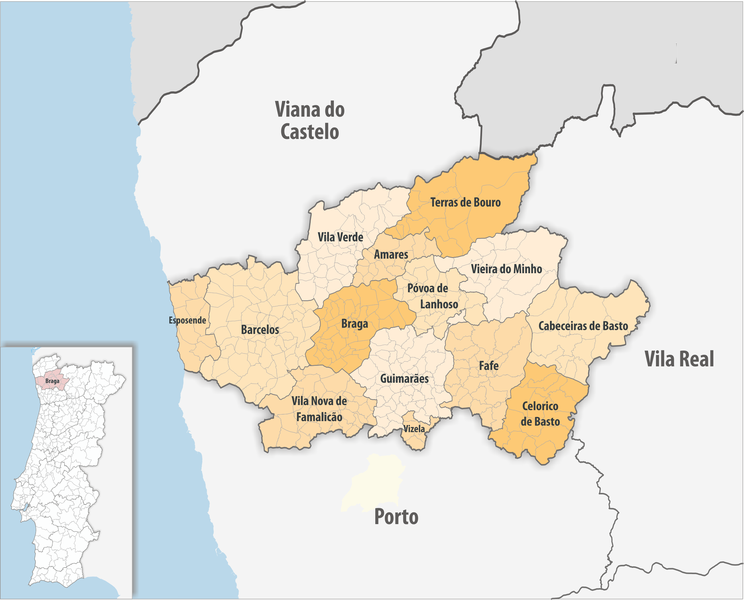
Braga district

The district comprises 14 municipalities:

- Amares
- Barcelos
- Braga
- Cabeceiras de Basto
- Celorico de Basto
- Esposende
- Fafe
- Guimarães
- Póvoa de Lanhoso
- Terras de Bouro
- Vieira do Minho
- Vila Nova de Famalicão
- Vila Verde
- Vizela

== Geography ==
The district of Braga has a very rugged terrain, dominated by high altitudes to the east, close to the Spanish border and the border with the Vila Real district, and going down towards the western coast, cutting through the valleys of several rivers that flow from the north-east to the south-west.

The highest altitudes are found in the Serra Amarela (1,361m), on the border with the Viana do Castelo district and the border with Spain, with the Serra do Gerês, whose highest altitude, 1,545m, lies precisely on the border with the Vila Real district and very close to the Spanish border, and in the western part of the Serra da Cabreira, which reaches Alto do Talefe, within the Braga district, 1,262m high.

The Cávado River valley is an important part of the hydrographic network, cutting completely through the district and dividing its mountains into two distinct areas. The Cávado enters the district in the east, where it serves as a border with the Vila Real district for a few kilometres, and flows into the Atlantic Ocean off the coast of Esposende, to the west, the only relatively flat area in the district. The Cávado River basin also includes the valley of the Homem River, which rises in Gerês mountains and flows into the Cávado at the confluence of the municipalities of Braga, Vila Verde and Amares.

To the south of the Cávado, another important valley is that of the River Ave, which rises in the district, in the Serra da Cabreira, and crosses its southern part, serving as a border with the Porto district for almost 20 km. One of the Ave's tributaries, the Vizela River, continues the southern limit of the district for another 20 km. The River Este, which flows through the district's capital, is another important tributary of the Ave.

To the north, the valley of the River Neiva serves as a border with the Viana do Castelo district along the entire lower part of the course of this river (which is quite short). On the other hand, the south-eastern part of the district forms part of the hydrographic basin of the River Douro, through the River Tâmega, which serves as a border with the Vila Real district and the Porto district, and some of its small tributaries.

There are several dams in the district. The best known is the Vilarinho das Furnas dam, in the upper reaches of the River Homem. In the lower Cávado is the Penide dam and in the upper Cávado are the Caniçada dam, the Salamonde dam and the Venda Nova dam. On the River Ave are some small dams, and the Ermal dam, which is much larger.

The coast, contained entirely within the Esposende municipality, is sandy.

== Summary of votes and seats won 1976-2022 ==
Summary of election results from Braga district, 1976-2022
Parties	%	S	%	S	%	S	%	S	%	S	%	S	%	S	%	S	%	S	%	S	%	S	%	S	%	S	%	S	%	S	%	S
Parties	1976		1979		1980		1983		1985		1987		1991		1995		1999		2002		2005		2009		2011		2015		2019		2022	
PS	32.3	6	30.2	5	29.3	5	39.7	7	21.8	4	25.9	5	31.5	5	42.9	8	44.3	8	37.4	8	45.4	9	41.7	9	32.9	7	30.9	7	36.4	8	42.0	9
PSD	28.6	5	In AD				27.0	5	32.8	6	53.4	10	53.6	10	38.2	7	36.7	7	44.4	9	32.9	7	30.8	6	40.1	9	In PàF		34.1	8	34.8	8
CDS-PP	25.2	4	In AD				18.3	3	14.0	2	5.9	1	5.6	1	10.7	1	8.9	1	9.3	1	7.8	1	9.7	2	10.4	2	In PàF		4.1	1	2.1	
PCP/APU/CDU	4.2		10.0	1	8.4	1	8.8	1	8.5	1	6.1	1	4.6		4.5		5.4	1	4.4		4.8	1	4.6	1	4.9	1	5.2	1	4.0		2.6	
AD			51.9	9	54.9	9																										
PRD									16.8	3	3.3																					
BE																	1.2		1.7		4.6		7.8	1	4.2		8.8	1	8.9	2	3.7	
PàF																											45.6	10				
CHEGA																													0.7		5.8	1
IL																													0.8		4.3	1
Total seats	15						16				17		16				17		18				19									
Source: Comissão Nacional de Eleições
