= Alto Alentejo =

Alto Alentejo may refer to:

- Alto Alentejo Province (1936-1976)
- Alto Alentejo (intermunicipal community) (NUTS 3 region)

== See also ==
- Baixo Alentejo (disambiguation)
