= Entre Douro e Minho =

Historical province of Portugal

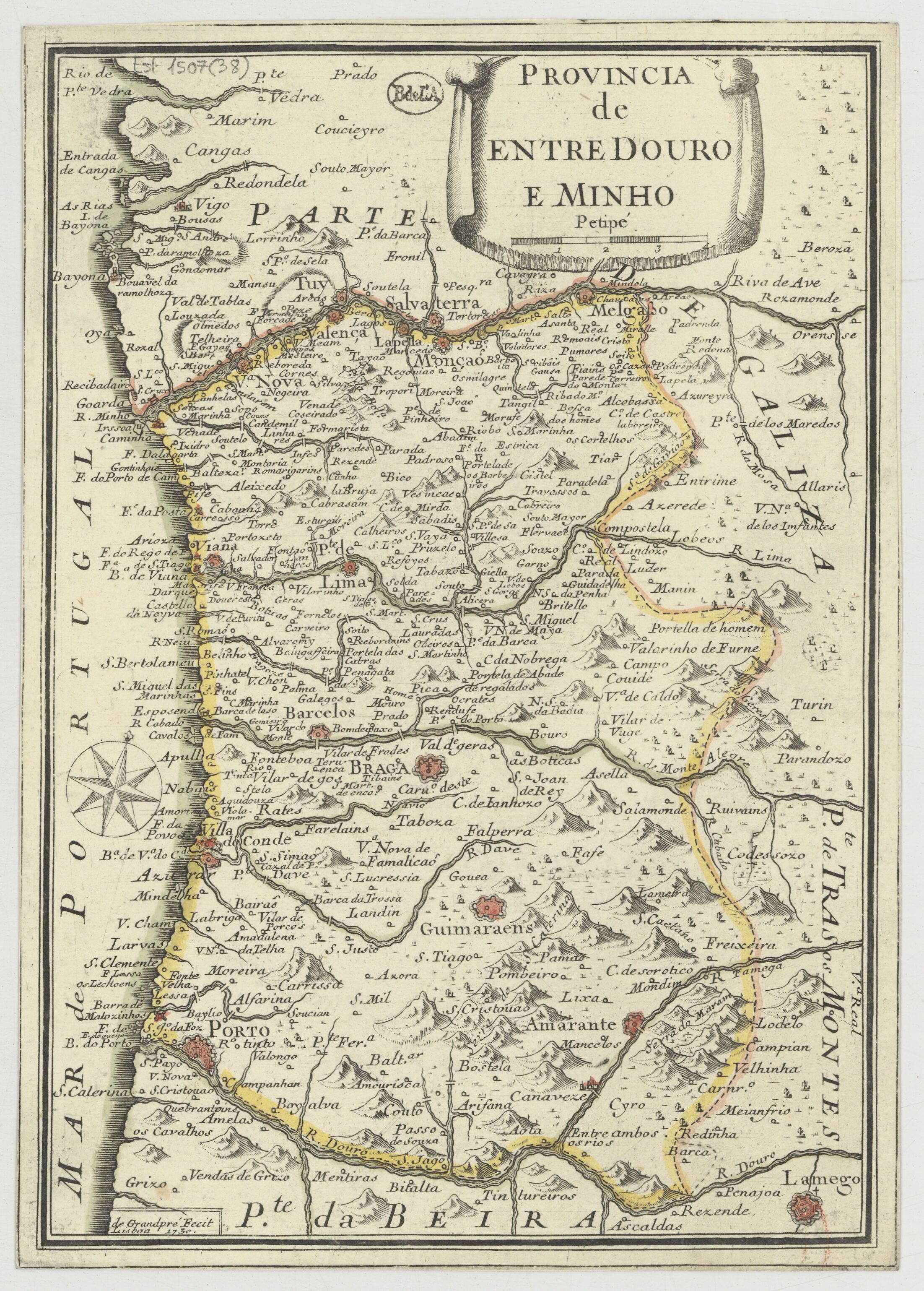
Map of Entre Douro e Minho from 1730

Entre Douro e Minho (Portuguese pronunciation: [ˈẽtɾɨ ˈðoɾu i ˈmiɲu]) is one of the historical provinces of Portugal which encompassed the country's northern Atlantic seaboard between the Douro and Minho rivers. Contemporaries often referred to the province as simply "Minho". It was one of six provinces Portugal was commonly divided into from the early modern period until 1936, although these provinces were not recognized as official units of government.

== Geography ==
The coastline of Entre Minho e Douro is level and unbroken except by the estuaries of the main rivers; inland, the elevation gradually increases towards the north and east, where several mountain ranges mark the frontier. Of these, the most important are the Serra da Peneda (4,728 feet, 1,441 m), between the rivers Minho and Lima; the Serra do Gerez (4,357 feet, 1,328 m), on the Galician border; the Serra da Cabreira (4,021 feet, 1,226 m), immediately to the south; and the Serra do Marão (4,642 feet, 1,415 m), in the extreme south-east.

As its name implies, the province is bounded by two rivers, the Douro on the south, and the Minho, or Miño, on the north. Some old maps show areas south of the Douro River belonging to the old Entre-Douro-e-Minho territory, while other old maps make the province exactly match the current Viana do Castelo District, Braga District and Porto District. Nevertheless, if the name Entre-Douro-e-Minho ("Between-Douro-and-Minho") was strictly taken in account, the latter definition would make sense.

There are three other large rivers which, like the Minho, flow west-south-west into the Atlantic. The Lima or Antela (Spanish Limia) rises in Galicia, and reaches the sea at Viana do Castelo; the Cávado springs from the southern foothills of La Raya Seca, on the northern frontier of Trás-os-Montes, and forms, at its mouth, the small harbour of Esposende; and the Ave descends from its sources in the Serra da Cabreira to Vila do Conde, where it enters the Atlantic. A large right-hand tributary of the Douro, the Tâmega, rises in Galicia, and skirts the western slopes of the Serra de Marão.

== History ==
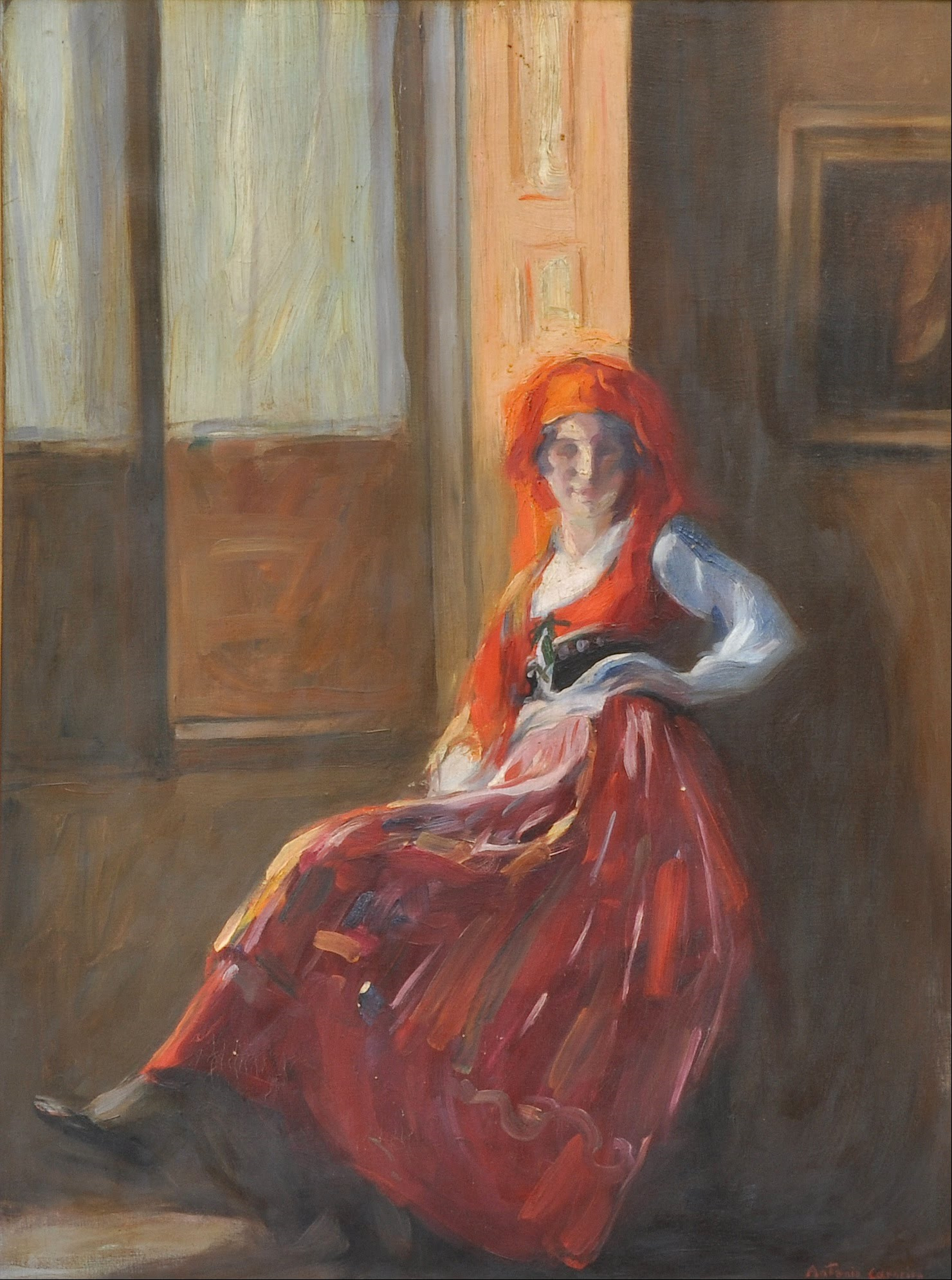
António Carneiro - Young Lady from Minho, 1917

The separated municipalities of Gaia and Vila Nova were integrated in the administration of Porto city between 1383 and 1518. In 1936, when Portugal was divided into 13 official provinces, Entre Douro e Minho was split into Minho Province and Douro Litoral Province. This reform would make Minho Province corresponding exactly to modern Viana do Castelo District and Braga District. Minho's provincial chieftaincy was attributed to the city of Braga. On the other hand, Douro Litoral corresponded to modern Porto District plus four municipalities of Aveiro District, and two of Viseu District to the then new Douro Litoral Province. Douro Litoral chieftaincy was attributed to the city of Porto.

Being seen as a trace of Estado Novo policies, the territorial definitions of 1936, though having innocuous and non-political characters, were erased in 1976 soon after the Carnation Revolution. Nevertheless, people still use the designations of 1936 on a daily basis because they more or less accurately correspond to the historical identity of the locals e.g.: "Minhotos", "Durienses", "Beirões", "Ribatejanos", etc., and many books and maps still show them.

== Cities before 1936 ==
- Porto (Immemorial city)
- Braga (Immemorial city)
- Penafiel (city since 1770)
- Viana do Castelo (1848)
- Guimarães (1853)
- Barcelos (1928)

== See also ==
- Costa Verde (Portugal)
- Douro
- Norte Region
- Kingdom of Northern Lusitania
