= Costa Verde (Portugal) =

Region of northwest Portugal

- Region of Portugal
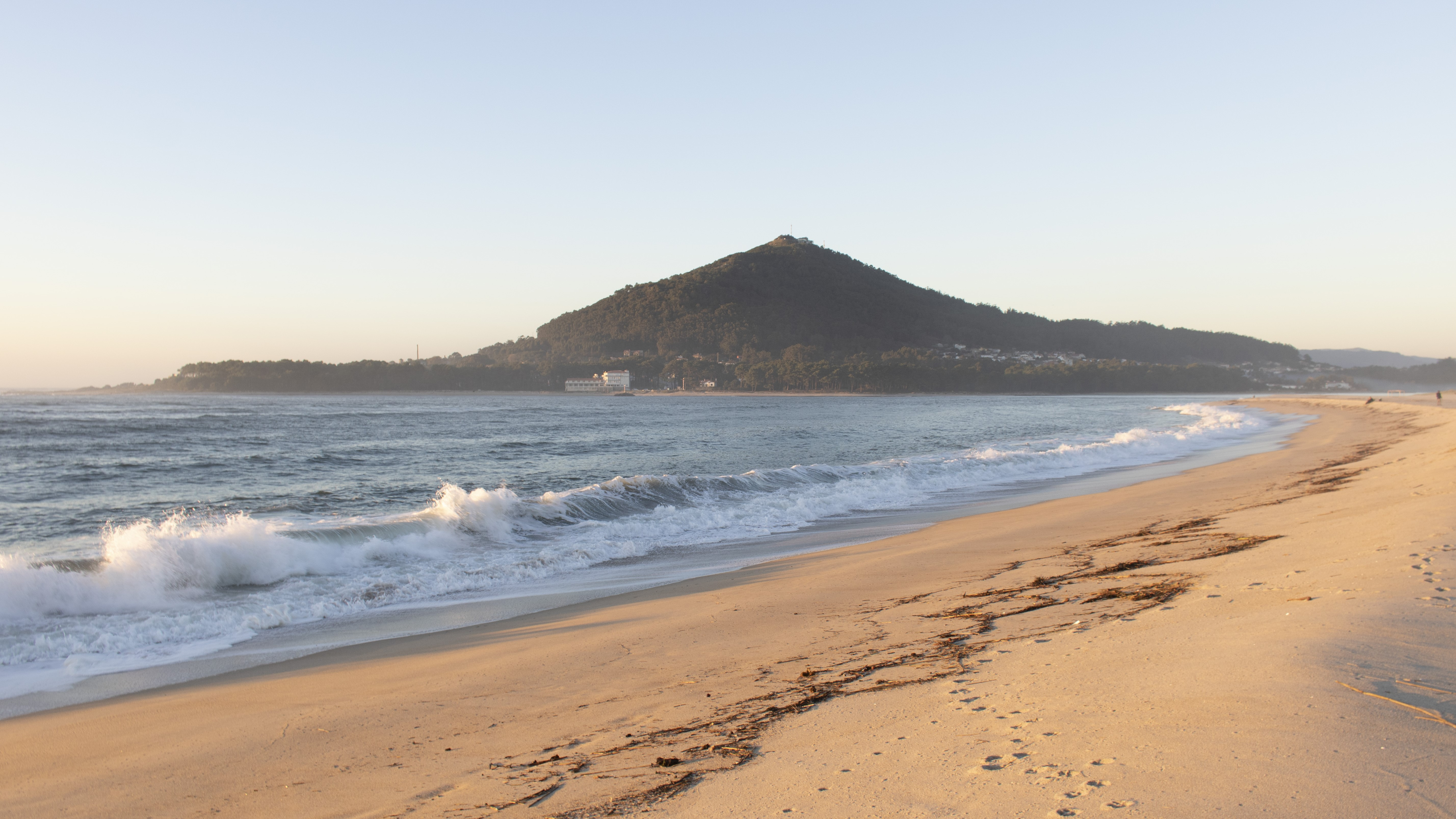
- Costa Verde
- Interactive map of Costa Verde
- Coordinates: 41.540642°N 8.792947°W
- Country: Portugal
- Time zone: UTC

Costa Verde (English: Green Coast) is a tourist and coastal region of northwest Portugal, delimited by the river mouths of Minho in the north and Douro in the south.

The name of the region comes from the dominant colour of the dense vegetation of the land, the green (Verde in Portuguese) verdure supported by the abundant precipitation characteristic of Cantabrian mixed forests. The climate is classified as Mediterranean (Köppen climate classification: Csb). As a result, its climate shares many characteristics with coastal southwestern Portugal: warm, dry summers and mild rainy winters.

In the coastal area, along with Porto, there are cities and towns with a strong tradition of beach tourism, and in fisheries, most notably Espinho and Póvoa de Varzim, both cities have popular casinos, hotels and golf courses. Other relevant coastal towns, with less urban development, include Esposende, Viana do Castelo, Vila do Conde, and Caminha. Several beaches in these municipalities are worthy of note, such as Moledo, Apúlia, Fão and Vila Praia de Âncora. The Porto area includes Matosinhos, Maia, and Vila Nova de Gaia which are relevant urban destinations.

Inland towns are growing in popularity recently, mostly due to historical importance, namely Braga, Guimarães and, occasionally, also Barcelos and Amarante.

White Vinho Verde, especially those from the grape varieties of Alvarinho, and Alvarinho-Trajadura and sweeter Loureiro, are the typical and popular wines of the region. Inland, Ponte de Lima is notable as a touristic destination and the popularity of its red Vinho Verde, along with the one from Ponte da Barca, which is drunk not in a glass but using a bowl, made out of potter's clay, known as malga.
