= Beira Alta (region) =

Region in Portugal

Beira Alta was one of the 13 regions of continental Portugal identified by geographer Amorim Girão, in a study published between 1927 and 1930. With Beira Trasmontana it became Beira Alta Province.
