= Beira Litoral Province =

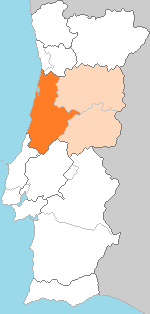
Beira Litoral (Dark Orange) in the region of Beira (Light Orange).

Beira Litoral is a historical (or natural region) province (província) of Portugal, formally instituted in an administrative reform of 1936. It was abolished with the 1976 Constitution of Portugal.

The province was bordered on the north by Douro Litoral Province, on the east by Beira Alta Province and Beira Baixa Province, on the southeast by Ribatejo Province, on the southwest by Estremadura Province and on the West by the Atlantic Ocean.

Beira Litoral was made up of 33 municipalities (concelhos), integrated for the most part into Aveiro District and Coimbra District, half of Leiria District, and one municipality of Santarém District. Its capital was the city of Coimbra. The included municipalities by district were:

- Aveiro District: Águeda, Albergaria-a-Velha, Anadia, Aveiro, Estarreja, Ílhavo, Mealhada, Murtosa, Oliveira de Azeméis, Oliveira do Bairro, Ovar, São João da Madeira, Sever do Vouga, Vagos, Vale de Cambra.
- Coimbra District: Arganil, Cantanhede, Coimbra, Condeixa-a-Nova, Figueira da Foz, Góis, Lousã, Mira, Miranda do Corvo, Montemor-o-Velho, Penacova, Penela, Poiares, Soure.
- Leiria District: Alvaiázere, Ansião, Batalha, Castanheira de Pêra, Figueiró dos Vinhos, Leiria, Pedrógão Grande, Pombal.
- Santarém District: Ourém.

Today, nearly all of the former province is located in the Centro Region, only three municipalities are situated in the Norte Region, subregion of Entre Douro e Vouga (namely Oliveira de Azeméis, São João da Madeira and Vale de Cambra).

The municipalities in the Centro Region are divided among the subregions Baixo Vouga, Baixo Mondego, nearly all of Pinhal Interior Norte (except Oliveira do Hospital and Tábua, which belong to Beira Alta, and Pampilhosa da Serra, part of Beira Baixa), part of Pinhal Litoral (except Marinha Grande and Porto de Mós), plus one municipality in Médio Tejo (Ourém).
