= Estremadura Province (historical) =

Historical province of Portugal

Estremadura Province (to 1933)
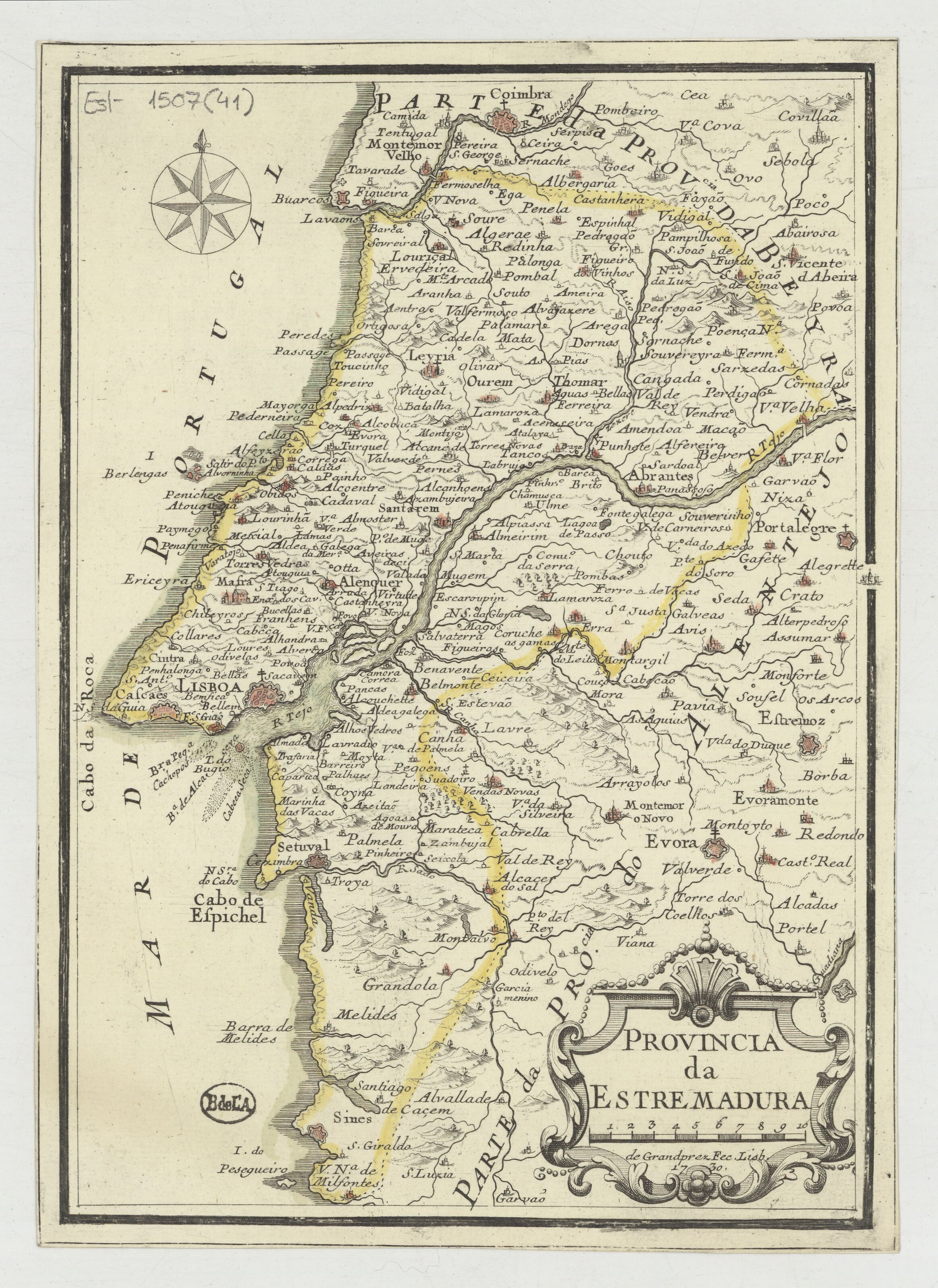
- Interactive map of Estremadura Province (to 1933)
- Country: Portugal

Estremadura Province (1933–1959)
- Interactive map of Estremadura Province (1933–1959)
- Coordinates: 39°15′00″N 09°10′00″W
- Country: Portugal

Estremadura Province (European Portuguese pronunciation: [(i)ʃtɾɨmɐˈðuɾɐ]) is one of the six historical provinces of Portugal.

It is located along the Atlantic Ocean coast in the center of the country and includes Lisbon, the capital. The name of this province (and also the Spanish Extremadura) originates from the Spanish and Portuguese struggle with the Moors, and the Christian military victories over the Moors (moros) during the 12th century. These provinces were called Extrema Durii, which means "farthest from the Douro River."

During the 19th century, Estremadura was the only province in the kingdom that did not border Spain. The provinces Beira and Alentejo bordered on the north, east, and south. Its 164-mile (264 km) western border was with the Atlantic Ocean, and it was 85 miles (137 km) wide at its widest point.

In 1835, Portugal divided into districts, which were subdivided into counties and parishes. Estremadura Province included Districts of Lisbon, Santarém, Leiria and part of Setúbal with Lisboa as its capital. Maps from this time show six provinces, of which Estremadura was one, but this was not official with the government.

The population of the province in 1841 was 782,875 and it had an area of 9,850 square miles.

On 22 February 1933, Portugal was divided into eleven provinces. Today, continental Portugal is divided into 18 administrative districts, each with a district capital. However, the historic provinces (1933–1959) continue to be used in everyday life despite the new district system.

== See also ==
- Estremadura Province (1936–1976)
- History of Portugal
- Lisboa VR, a wine region which until 2009 was known as Estremadura VR
- Lisboa Region
- Provinces of Portugal
- Vila Nova de São Pedro
