= Estremadura Province (1936–1976) =

Portuguese province

Coordinates: 38°42′29″N 9°08′20″W

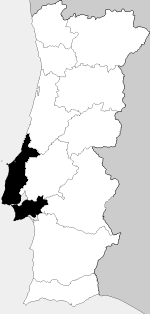
Estremadura

Estremadura Province (European Portuguese pronunciation: [(i)ʃtɾɨmɐˈðuɾɐ]) is a historical province of Portugal. It is located along the Atlantic Ocean coast in the center of the country and includes Lisbon, the capital. Other notable places include Almada, Amadora, Barreiro, Caparica, Peniche, Cabo da Roca, Caldas da Rainha, Alcobaça, Nazaré, Lourinhã, Torres Vedras, Montijo, and Setúbal.

Estremadura should not be confused with Extremadura, the autonomous community of Spain. The name of both regions comes from the fact that they were at the "extreme" border of Christendom during a phase of the Reconquest. The meaning is therefore similar to the marches. Estremadura was the seat of one of the early civilizations of the Iberian Christianity period. See Vila Nova de São Pedro.

== See also ==
- Lisboa VR, a wine region which until 2009 was known as Estremadura VR
- Estremadura Province (historical)
