= Trás-os-Montes e Alto Douro Province =

Portuguese province (1936–1976)

Coordinates: 41°17′43.696″N 7°44′46.550″W

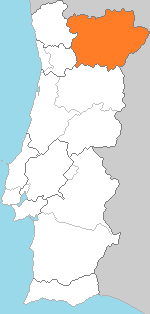
The historical province of Trás-os-Montes e Alto Douro

Trás-os-Montes e Alto Douro (Portuguese pronunciation: [ˌtɾaz uʒ ˈmõtɨz i ˈaltu ˈðoɾu]) is a historical province of Portugal located in the northeastern corner of the country, known for its scenery, which includes plateaux, river valleys, mountains, and castles.

== History ==
A first attempt to register its constitution was made under the reign of King Sancho II (1223–1248). A second was made in the reign of his son and successor, Afonso III (1248–1279), under the Inquirições or royal commissions in 1258, intending to base the territory of Trás-os-Montes on so-called "new towns" under direct control of the Crown. Afonso III gave it its charter in 1253, referring to the town, "a hill opposite the Crespos", which already had a core of settlements organized around the Church of St. Facundo.

Since 1833 the region has been divided into two districts on the right (northern) bank of the Douro river — Vila Real and Bragança, with 5 other municipalities on the south bank of the Douro river included in the districts of Viseu and Guarda. The name — Beyond-the-Mountains and Upper Douro — refers to the location on the "other" (eastern) side of such mountains as Marão, Alvão and Gerês, which separate the coast from the interior, and along the upper valley of the Douro River. This isolation kept the province poor and underpopulated for centuries, causing many people to move to the coast or emigrate to other European countries such as France, Luxembourg and Switzerland, and to Brazil.

The most important towns in the region are Vila Real, Bragança, Chaves, Mirandela, Macedo de Cavaleiros, Lamego, Peso da Régua, Mogadouro, Miranda do Douro and Valpaços. All are relatively small, with less than 50 000 inhabitants. Many people in the region still live in small villages. Traditionally these villages were cut off from the coast due to the lack of good roads, and suffered the effects of poverty and isolation. Emigration was often the only option. Today the situation has improved with better roads, but most villages are still losing population as youngsters there move to bigger towns for a better life.

In small villages the ageing inhabitants still eke out a living from small farms. Corn, rye, potatoes, wheat, olive oil, chestnuts, and grapes for wine (namely Port wine) have been the main agricultural products. Granite and mineral water are also important industries.

There is a popular saying: "Beyond Marão, those who rule are those who're there" ("Para lá do Marão mandam os que lá estão"). Lisbon has paid little attention to this area until recent years. According to Padre Fontes, a local ethnographer, "in this centuries-old "corner of the corner of Europe", alone, in a struggle against the harsh soil and inclement climate, a character was formed: "that of the sad demeanor, the mistrusting air, courageous, daring, hardworking, loyal, and with strength of character a way of life." Etnografia Transmontana, Lisbon, 1992

The Transmontanos are known in Portugal for their often plentiful table, usually filled with wine, olive oil, sausage and bread.

== Municipalities ==
The historical province of Trás-os-Montes e Alto Douro included 31 municipalities, divided between four districts (Vila Real, Bragança, Viseu and Guarda), that include:

Vila Real (14 municipalities)

- Alijó
- Boticas
- Chaves
- Mesão Frio
- Mondim de Basto
- Montalegre
- Murça
- Peso da Régua
- Ribeira de Pena
- Sabrosa
- Santa Marta de Penaguião
- Valpaços
- Vila Pouca de Aguiar
- Vila Real

Bragança (12 municipalities)

- Alfândega da Fé
- Bragança
- Carrazeda de Ansiães
- Freixo de Espada-à-Cinta
- Macedo de Cavaleiros
- Miranda do Douro
- Mirandela
- Mogadouro
- Torre de Moncorvo
- Vila Flor
- Vimioso
- Vinhais

Viseu (4 of 24 municipalities)

- Armamar
- Lamego
- São João da Pesqueira
- Tabuaço

Guarda (1 of 14 municipalities)

- Vila Nova de Foz Côa

In 1998 there was a referendum on the creation of new Administrative Regions. The proposed region of Trás-os-Montes e Alto Douro included these 31 municipalities, plus Mêda, also from the District of Guarda. The referendum had low participation (less than the required 50% to be mandatory), but the No won and the Administrative Regions were not created.

== Culture ==
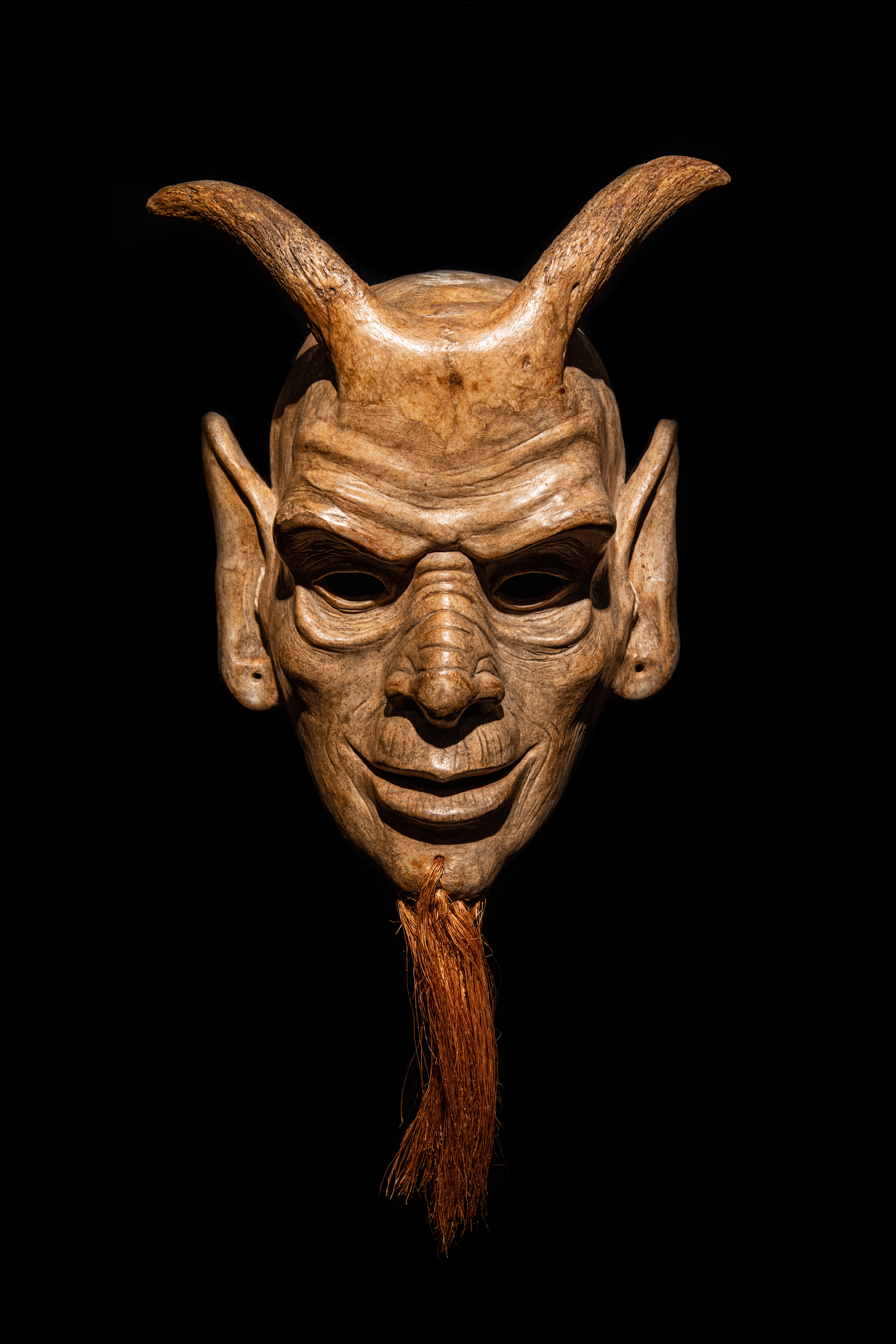
Mask Diabo used on folk fest of Carnaval.

Due to the region's isolation from outside influence, many folkloric forms have remained preserved up to the modern day. One example would be the area's distinctive traditional bagpipe, the gaita transmontana. Not only did Trás-os-Montes maintain a piping tradition as bagpipes in general declined throughout Europe, but the regional bagpipe also shows many aspects of pre-modern musical scales which have been preserved. Also, it's in this region that is spoken the second official language of Portugal, the Mirandese language.

== See also ==
- Trás-os-Montes
- Tras-os-Montes VR
- Cão de Gado Transmontano, is a large molosser working dog breed, originating in the region of Trás-os-Montes e Alto Douro Province.
