= Beira Alta Province =

Province of Portugal

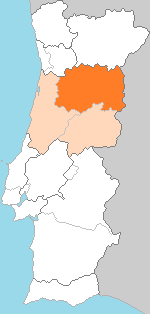
Beira Alta (dark orange) in the region of Beira (both colours).

Beira Alta Province (European Portuguese pronunciation: [ˈbɐjɾɐ ˈaltɐ]; "Upper Beira") was a Portuguese province in the north of Portugal.

Vast plateaus, river valleys, mountains, and castles abound in Beira Alta.

Formerly it was part of the Beira Province.

The two main cities were Guarda and Viseu. Other cities include Pinhel, Sabugal, Trancoso, Almeida, Oliveira do Hospital, Tondela, Mangualde, Santa Comba Dão, Seia, Gouveia, Meda.

The city of Viseu, once the capital of the Beira Alta, is now in the main city within the new Dão-Lafões Subregion, which is part of the Centro Region.

Guarda is now the capital of the new Beira Interior Norte Subregion within the Centro Region.
