= Baixo Alentejo Province =

Coordinates: 38.0712322°N 8.4184505°W

Baixo Alentejo
- Province
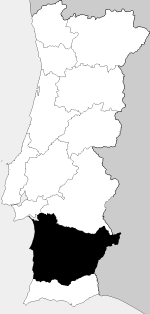
- Location of Baixo Alentejo in Portugal in 1936.
- Country: Portugal
- Seat: Beja

Baixo Alentejo was a Portuguese province. It was abolished with the Constitution of 1976.

== Districts ==
- Beja District
- Setúbal District (southern half)

== Subregions ==
The area is equal to the area covered by Baixo Alentejo Subregion and Alentejo Litoral Subregion.

== Municipalities ==
Municipality	District	Subregion
Alcácer do Sal	Setúbal	Alentejo Litoral
Aljustrel	Beja	Baixo Alentejo
Almodôvar	Beja	Baixo Alentejo
Alvito	Beja	Baixo Alentejo
Barrancos Municipality	Beja	Baixo Alentejo
Beja Municipality	Beja	Baixo Alentejo
Castro Verde Municipality	Beja	Baixo Alentejo
Cuba Municipality	Beja	Baixo Alentejo
Ferreira do Alentejo Municipality	Beja	Baixo Alentejo
Grândola Municipality	Setúbal	Alentejo Litoral
Mértola Municipality	Beja	Baixo Alentejo
Moura Municipality	Beja	Baixo Alentejo
Odemira Municipality	Beja	Alentejo Litoral
Ourique Municipality	Beja	Baixo Alentejo
Santiago do Cacém Municipality	Setúbal	Alentejo Litoral
Serpa Municipality	Beja	Baixo Alentejo
Sines Municipality	Setúbal	Alentejo Litoral
Vidigueira Municipality	Beja	Baixo Alentejo
