= Alto Alentejo Province =

Coordinates: 38.5725°N 7.9072°W

Alto Alentejo
- Province
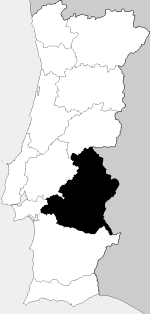
- Location of Alto Alentejo in Portugal in 1936.
- Country: Portugal
- Seat: Évora

Alto Alentejo was a Portuguese province. It was abolished with the Constitution of 1976.

The area is now covered by Alto Alentejo Subregion and Alentejo Central Subregion.

== Municipalities ==
- Alandroal Municipality
- Alter do Chão Municipality
- Arraiolos Municipality
- Arronches Municipality
- Avis
- Borba
- Campo Maior Municipality
- Castelo de Vide Municipality
- Crato
- Elvas
- Estremoz Municipality
- Évora Municipality
- Fronteira Municipality
- Gavião Municipality
- Marvão Municipality
- Monforte Municipality
- Montemor-o-Novo Municipality
- Mora
- Mourão Municipality
- Nisa Municipality
- Ponte de Sôr Municipality
- Portalegre Municipality
- Portel Municipality
- Redondo Municipality
- Reguengos de Monsaraz Municipality
- Sousel Municipality
- Viana do Alentejo Municipality
- Vila Viçosa Municipality
