= Douro Litoral Province =

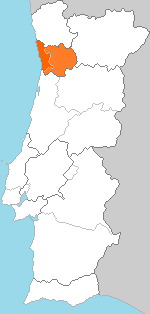
Former province of Douro Litoral

Douro Litoral (European Portuguese pronunciation: [ˈdoɾu lituˈɾal]) is a historical province of Portugal. It is centered on the city of Porto, now the capital of the Norte Region. Other important cities in the province are Vila Nova de Gaia, Matosinhos, Maia, Póvoa de Varzim, and the historically important Penafiel, Amarante, Feira, Vila do Conde.

The province was abolished in an administrative reform in 1976. Nowaday Douro Litoral is divided between Metropolitan Area of Porto Subregion, Tâmega Subregion, and parts of Ave Subregion and Entre Douro e Vouga Subregion.

The coast is part of the Costa Verde tourist area.

Nigerite, a unique mineral, is found in the province.
