= Monsaraz =

- Civil parish
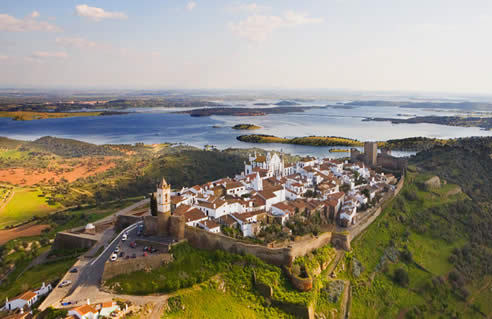
- View of Monsaraz and the Alqueva Dam lake

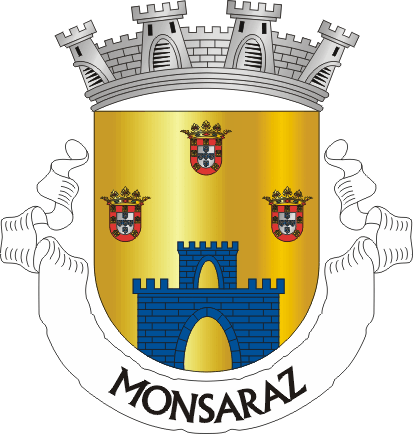
- Coat of arms

- Location in Portugal
- Coordinates: 38.444°N 7.381°W
- Country: Portugal
- Region: Alentejo
- Intermunic. comm.: Alentejo Central
- District: Évora
- Municipality: Reguengos de Monsaraz

Area
  - Total: 88.29 km^{2} (34.09 sq mi)
- Elevation: 195 m (640 ft)

Population (2011)
  - Total: 782
  - Density: 8.86/km^{2} (22.9/sq mi)
- Time zone: UTC+00:00 (WET)
  - Summer (DST): UTC+01:00 (WEST)
- Postal code: 7200
- Area code: 266
- Patron: Santa Maria da Lagoa
- Website: http://www.monsaraz.pt/

Monsaraz is a civil parish (freguesia) of the municipality of Reguengos de Monsaraz, on the right margin of the Guadiana River in the Portuguese Alentejo region, near its border with Spain. The population in 2011 was 782, in an area of 88.29 km^{2}.

== History ==
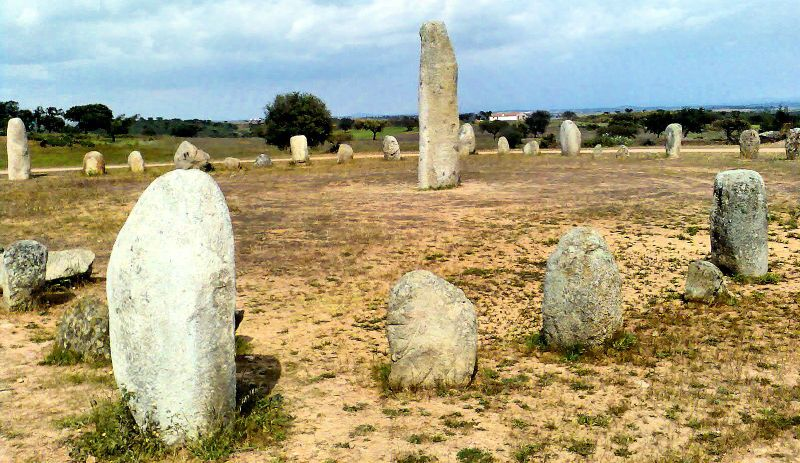
The Megalithic monuments of the Cromlech of Xerez

Due to its geographic position, the hilltop of Monsaraz always occupied an important place in the history of the municipality, having been occupied by different peoples since the pre-historical record. It is one of the oldest settlements in southern Portugal, occupied since pre-history, with examples of permanent habitation including hundreds of megalithic monuments. These include the Neolithic remains of: Megalithic Monuments of Herdade de Xerez, Olival da Pega Dolmens, Menhir of Bulhoa, Rocha dos Namorados Menhir and Outeiro Menhir. The hill, on which the main settlement is located, was a pre-historic fortification, or castro, that was the basis of pre-Roman occupation and funerary temples, carved from the local rock.

Monsaraz was reorganized during the Roman occupation, and was later successively occupied by the Visigoths, Arabs, Mozarabs, Jews, and, after the Reconquista, Christians loyal to Afonso Henriques. In the 8th century, Monsaraz fell under the dominion of Arab forces who occupied the Iberian Peninsula, becoming known as Saris or Sharish, and following the control of the Taifa of Badajoz (one of the more prominent Arab centres at the time). The name Monsaraz originates from the word Xarez or Xerez, the Iberian transliteration of the Arabic Saris or Sharish, for the Gum Rockrose (Cistus ladanifer L.), a plant that still today prospers in poor, dry, acidic slate-based soil that surrounds Monsaraz. The Iberian words Xarez/Xerez latter evolved to the Portuguese Xaraz and to the Spanish (Castilian) Jerez (the Spanish name for the sherry wine). The settlement therefore came to be known as Monsaraz, originating from Monte Xaraz, i.e., fortified hill surrounded by Gum Rockroses. Its naturally prominent position, being the highest hill in the area as well as its proximity to the deep Guadiana valley, made it a location of strategic importance.

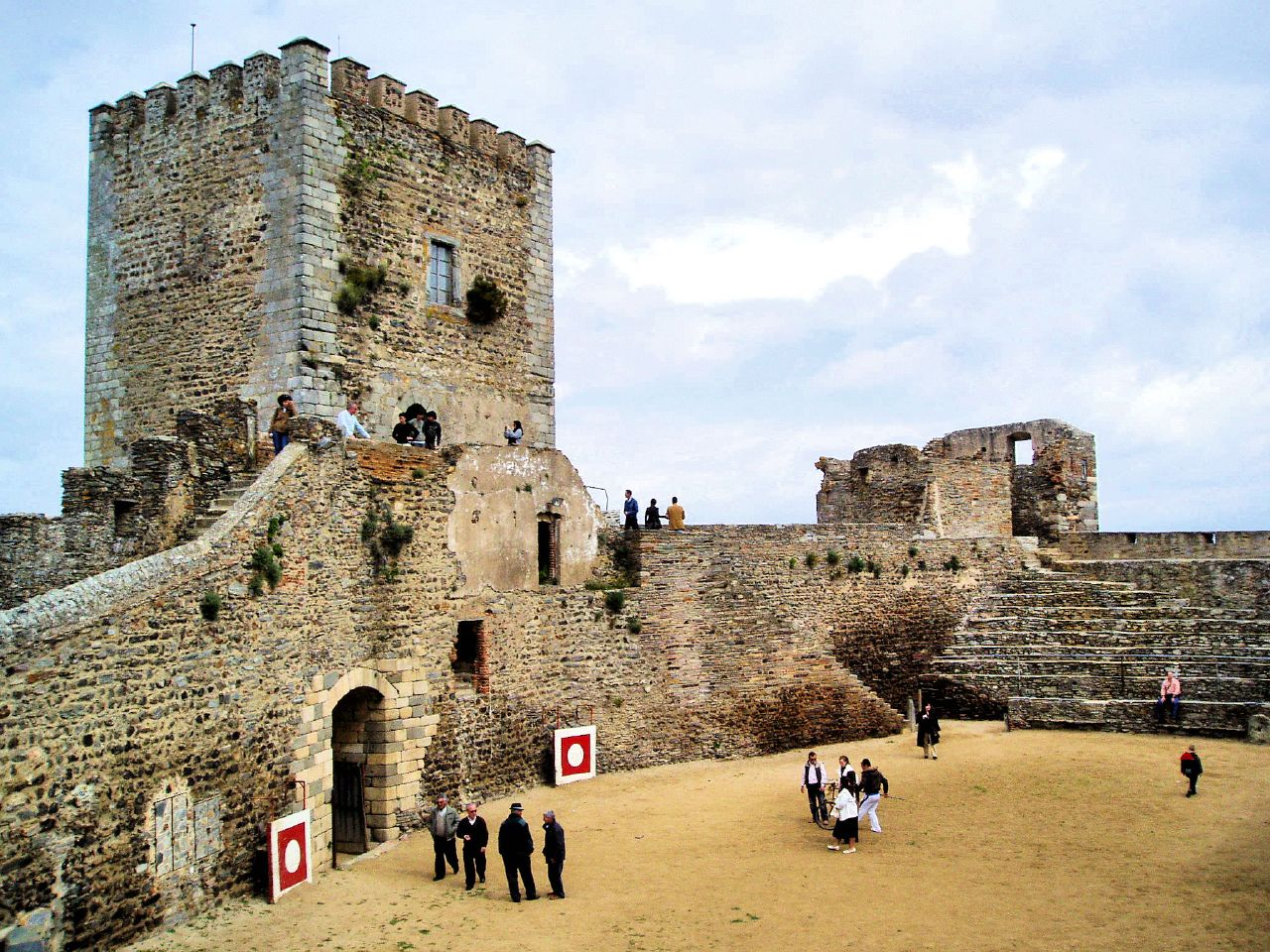
The Castle keep of Monsaraz, centre of tourism in the parish

In 1167, the Castle and medina was taken by Geraldo Sem Pavor, in an expedition that came from Évora (which had just been retaken, about the same time). After, Afonso Henriques' defeat in Badajoz, Monsaraz was once again taken by Muslim forces. In 1232, supported by the Knights Templar, King Sancho II definitively retook the citadel and town, placing it under the control of the Templars, and obligating them to establish a garrison that would protect the border. The Christian repopulation of Monsaraz ended around the reign of Afonso III, when it was assigned an alcalde, the knight Martim Anes, and first letter of foral.

In 1263 it was already an important fortress, being the head of a municipality, with large privileges. The local economy was fundamentally based on agriculture and livestock, existing some small artesnal industries producing terra cotta earthenware and hammered copper.

After the Portuguese Interregnum (1383-1385), the town of Monsaraz was integrated into the dominions of the House of Braganza under Nuno Álvares Pereira. By 1412, it is inherited by Fernando, his son, becoming one of the more precious profit centres in the Ducal estates.

In 1512, King Manuel of Portugal issued a foral (charter) to the Vila de Monsaraz, reformulating the public and jurisdictional administration of the municipality.

The demographic crises created by the plague forced the Duke of Bragança, in 1527 to carry out small land reforms in order to promote the settlement Monsaraz. The small plots were established in the area surrounding this village.

Following the Portuguese Restoration War, in 1640, the castle received new tactical defenses, that included a new walled bastion, that allowed the city-fort to be integrated into the system of defences that connected Elvas, Juromenha, Olivença and Mourão.

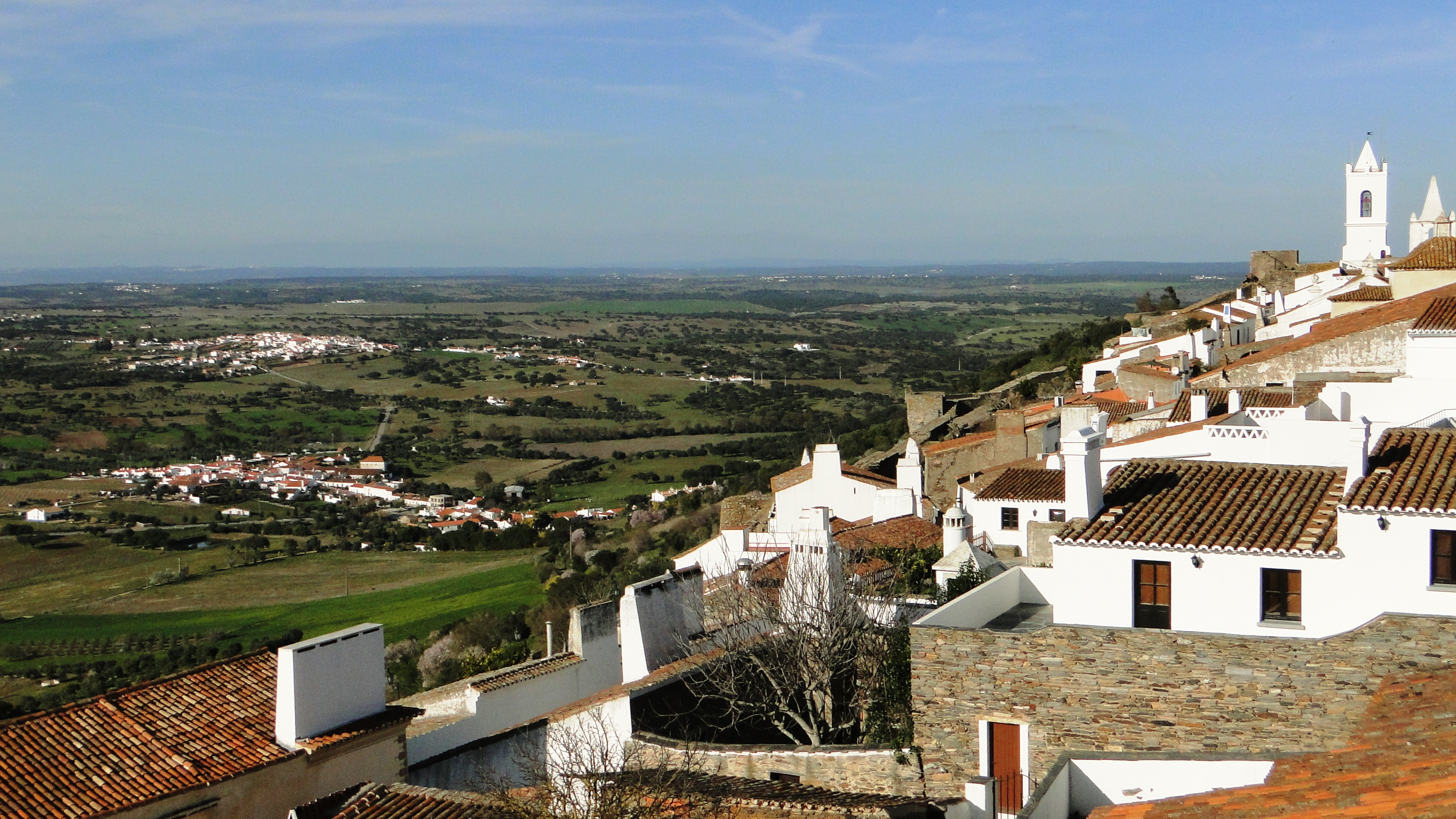
View from Monsaraz, Portugal

The condition of the walled medieval city, the growth of the farm estates of Reguengos, the richness of the artesnal production and vineyards, and more importantly, the loyalty towards the Miguelist forces during the Liberal Wars were all factors that contributed to the shifting of the municipal seat from Monsaraz to Vila Nova de Reguengos in 1838, a fact that became permanent after 1851.

== Geography ==
The parish of Monsaraz is located in the northeast corner of the municipality of Reguengos de Monsaraz fronting the Guadiana River and Alqueva Dam to the east, Corval to the west and Campinho to the south in the municipality of Reguengos de Monsaraz. Across the reservoir to the east is the parish of Mourão (in the municipality of Mourão) and to the north the parish of Capelins (in the municipality of Alandroal).

== Architecture ==
=== Prehistoric ===
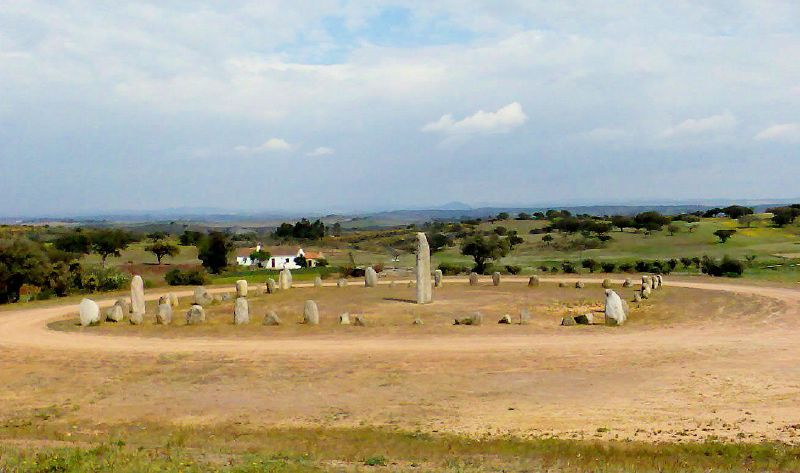
The Megalithic Monuments of Herdade de Xerez, showing the age of the region

- Olival da Pega Dolmen
- Megalithic Monuments of Herdade de Xerez
- Belhoa/Bulhoa Menhir
- Outeiro Menhir

=== Civic ===
- Casa da Inquisição
- Casa da Roda dos Expostos
- Casa do Juíz de Fora
- Cine Monsaraz
- Cistern of Monsaraz

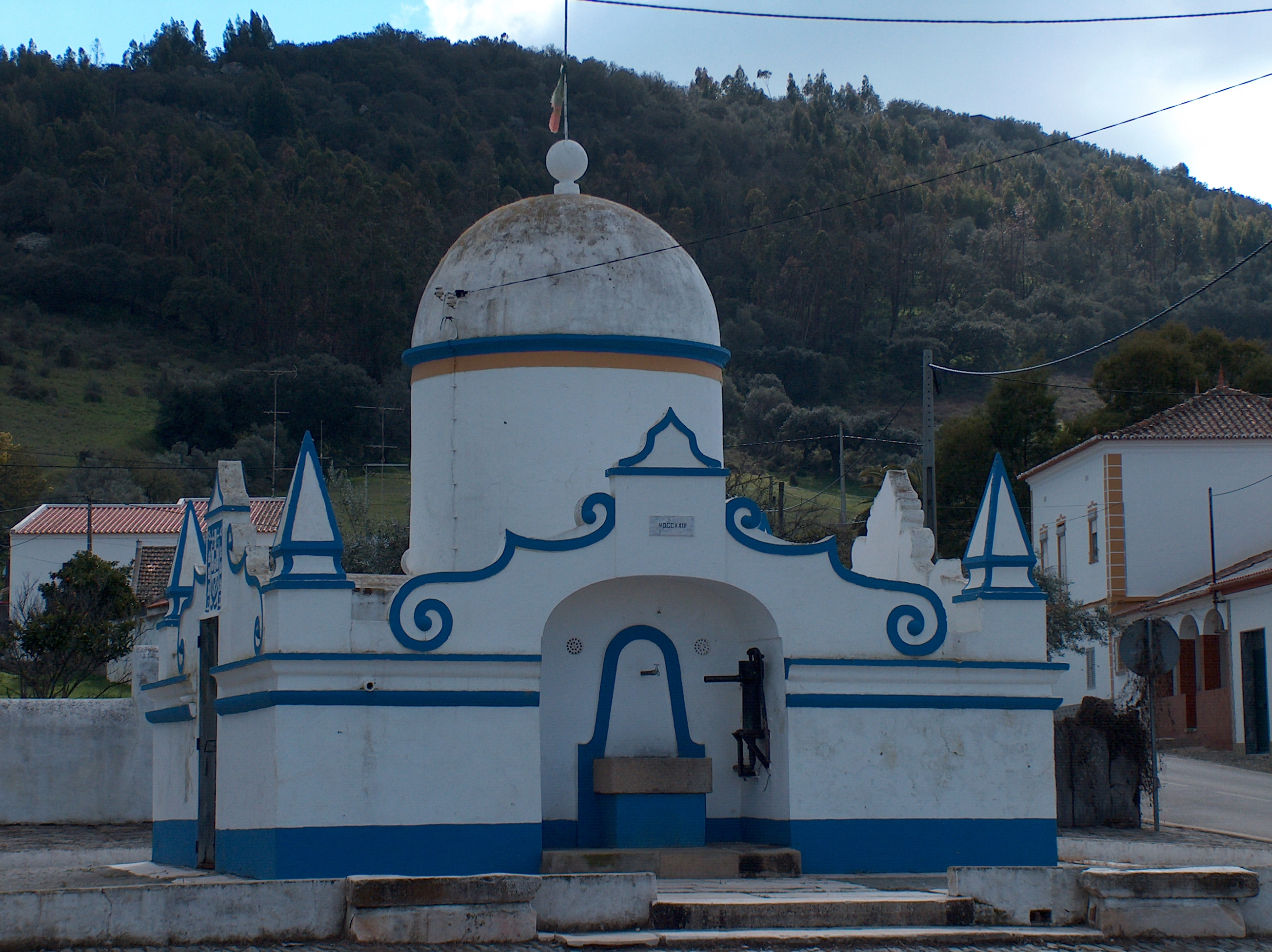
The white-washed Mannerist fountain of the Telheiro

- Fountain of the Telheiro
- Mill of Água do Gato
- Novos Paços do Concelho
- Paços da Audência
- Pillory of Monsaraz
- Restaurante Sem Fim/Lagar

=== Military ===
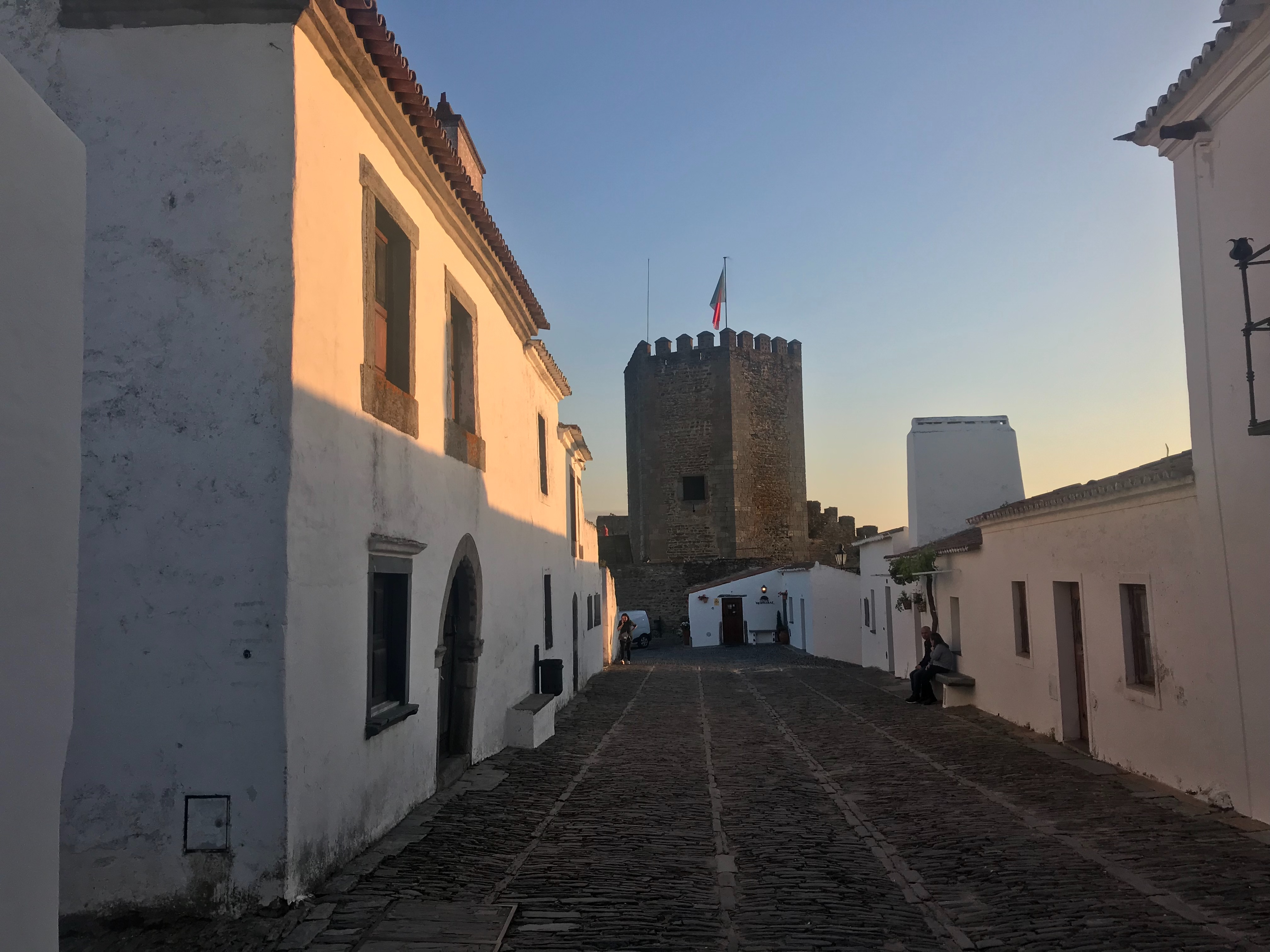
Watchtower of São Gens do Xarez.

- Fortifications of Monsaraz
- Watchtower of São Gens do Xarez (Atalaia de São Gens/Torre de São Gens do Xarez), a simple, square watchtower oriented to the cardinal points, but in a state of ruin, making reconstitution difficult, likely built in 1646 to guard the Guadiana River;

=== Religious ===
- Chapel of São Bento (Capela de São Bento/Ermida de São Bento), a rural chapel constructed at the end of the 16th century-beginning of the 17th century, through contributions of many of the local residents of Arrabalde da Vila, that includes frescos in a vaulted ceiling. After the 1755 Lisbon earthquake the building was left seriously damaged;
- Chapel of São João

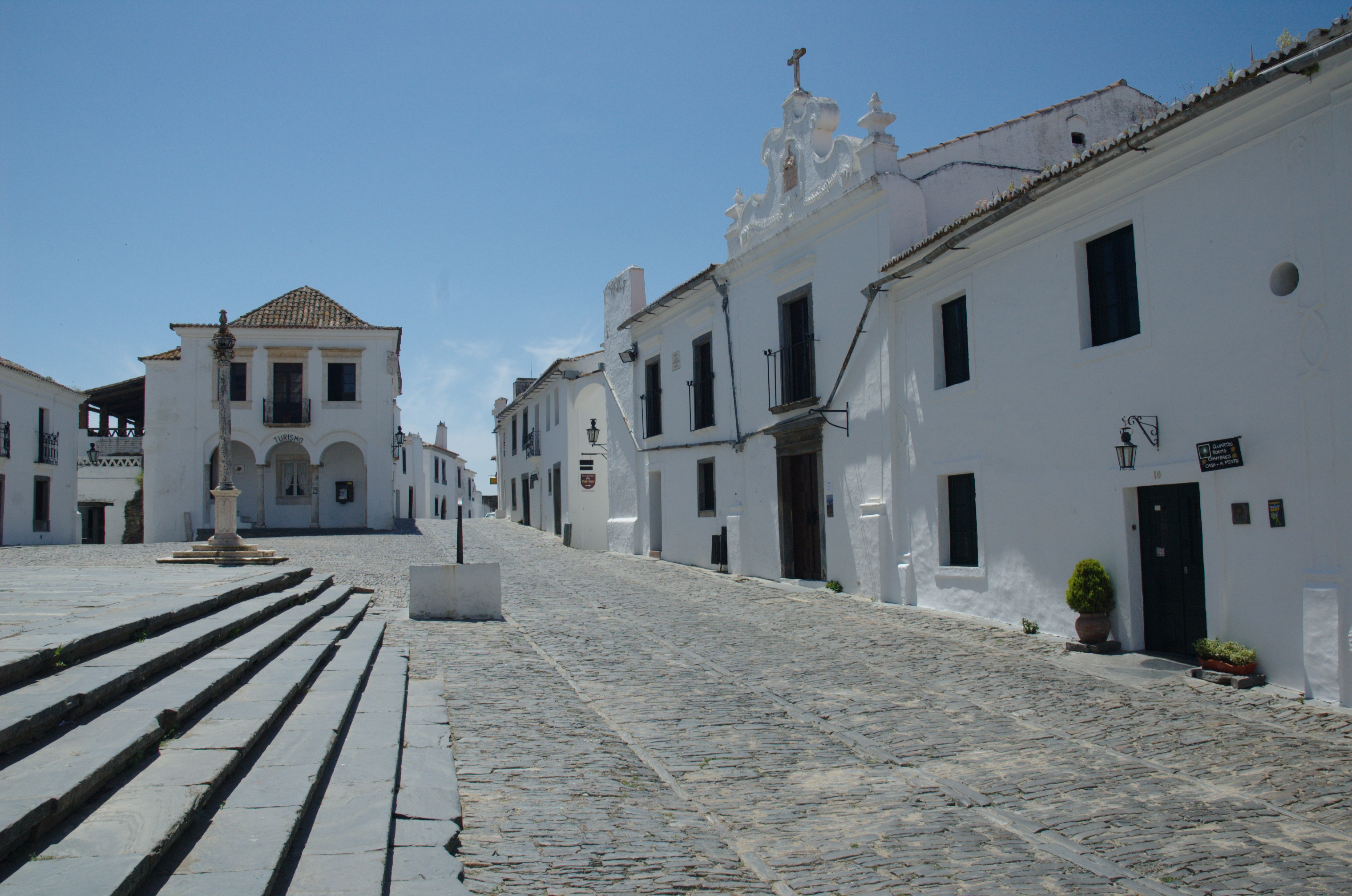
The pillory of Monsaraz across from the square from the Parochial church of Nossa Senhora da Lagoa

- Church of Nossa Senhora de Lagoa
- Church of Santiago Maior
- Church of the Convent of Nossa Senhora da Orada
- Church of the Misericórdia of Monsaraz
- Hermitage of Nossa Senhora do Carmo
- Hermitage of São João Baptista
- Hermitage of São Lázaro
- Hermitage of São Sebastião
- Hermitage of Santa Catarina de Monsaraz
