= Menhir of Bulhoa =

Phallic monolith in Évora district, Portugal

- Menir da Bulhoa
- Menhir of Abelhoa
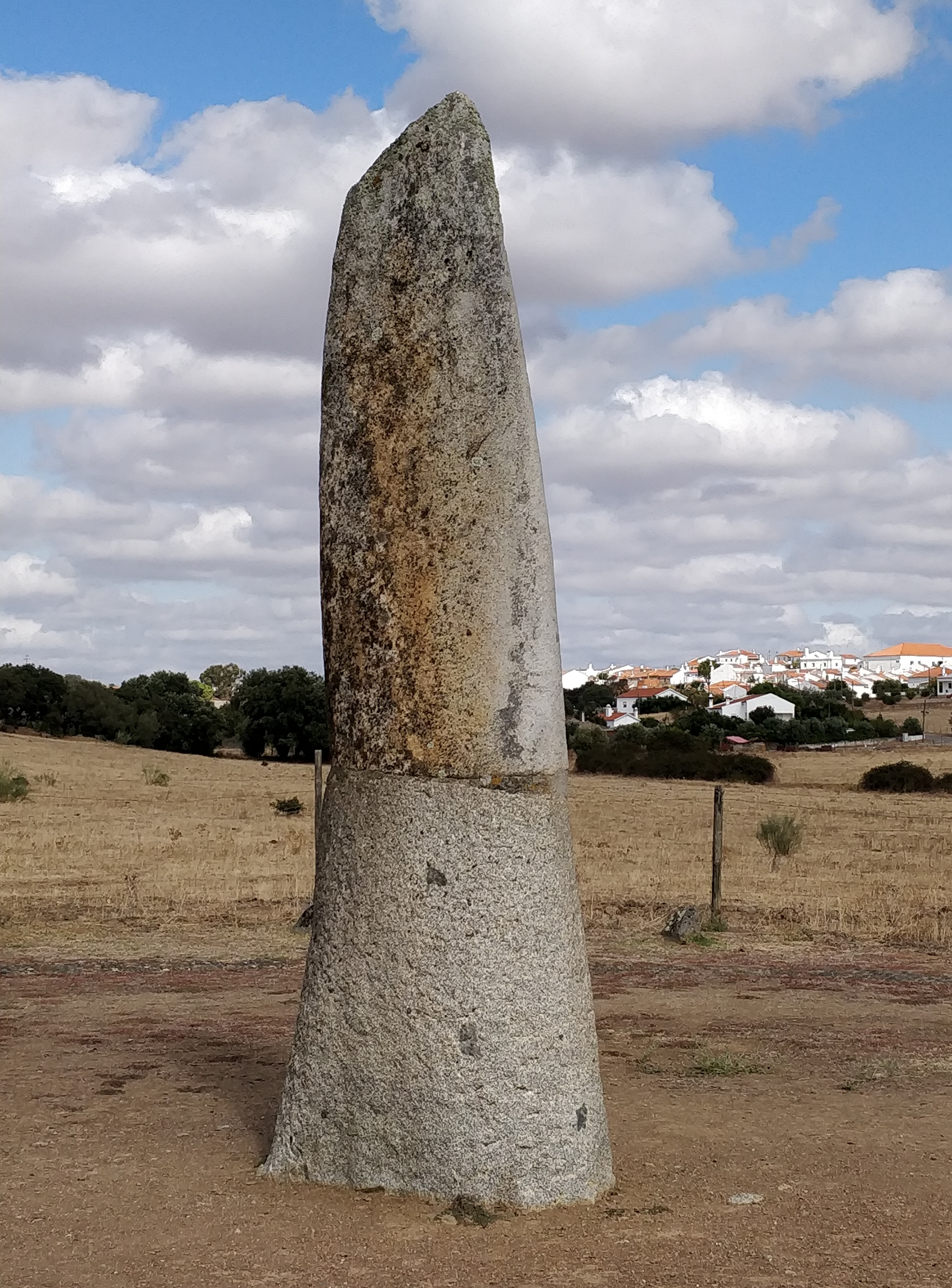
- The menhir in 2019
- Interactive map of Menhir of Bulhoa
- 38°27′44.1″N 7°22′58.5″W
- Type: Phallic menhir
- Periods: Neolithic
- Location: Monsaraz, Évora, Alentejo, Portugal

History
- Built: c. 3000 BC

Site notes
- Height: 4 m (13 ft)
- Discovered: 1970
- Condition: Restored
- Owner: Portuguese Republic
- Public access: Yes

The Menhir of Bulhoa (Portuguese: Menir da Bulhoa), also known as the Menhir of Abelhoa, is a granite megalithic standing stone, located near the parish of Monsaraz, in the municipality of the Reguengos de Monsaraz, in the Évora district of the Alentejo region of Portugal. It was classified as a National Monument by the Government of Portugal in 1971.

The menhir is thought to date back to between 3500 and 2500 BCE. Overlooked for a long time, it was identified in 1970. At that time it was lying flat on the ground, with the upper part separated from its base, which had been used in a nearby grape press. It was restored to its original shape soon after discovery, with the fracture remaining very noticeable.

It is situated on the road between the villages of Outeiro and Telheiro, on a flat area at the base of Monsaraz hill. The menhir is part of a megalithic nucleus that includes the menhirs of Monte da Ribeira and Outeiro and the Xerez Cromlech. It has a phallic appearance, being about four meters high and one meter in diameter. The stone is decorated with engravings depicting the sun's rays, a staff, and wavy and zigzagging lines. However, the fact that it lay on the ground for so long has contributed to the erosion of the carvings. It is not known whether the carvings date back to the menhir's origins or were added subsequently, although the motifs are similar to others found from the Neolithic and Chalcolithic eras.

== See also ==
- List of menhirs
