= Xerez Cromlech =

Megalithic complex in Évora district, Portugal

- Cromeleque do Xerez
- Conjunto megalítico da Herdade do Xerez
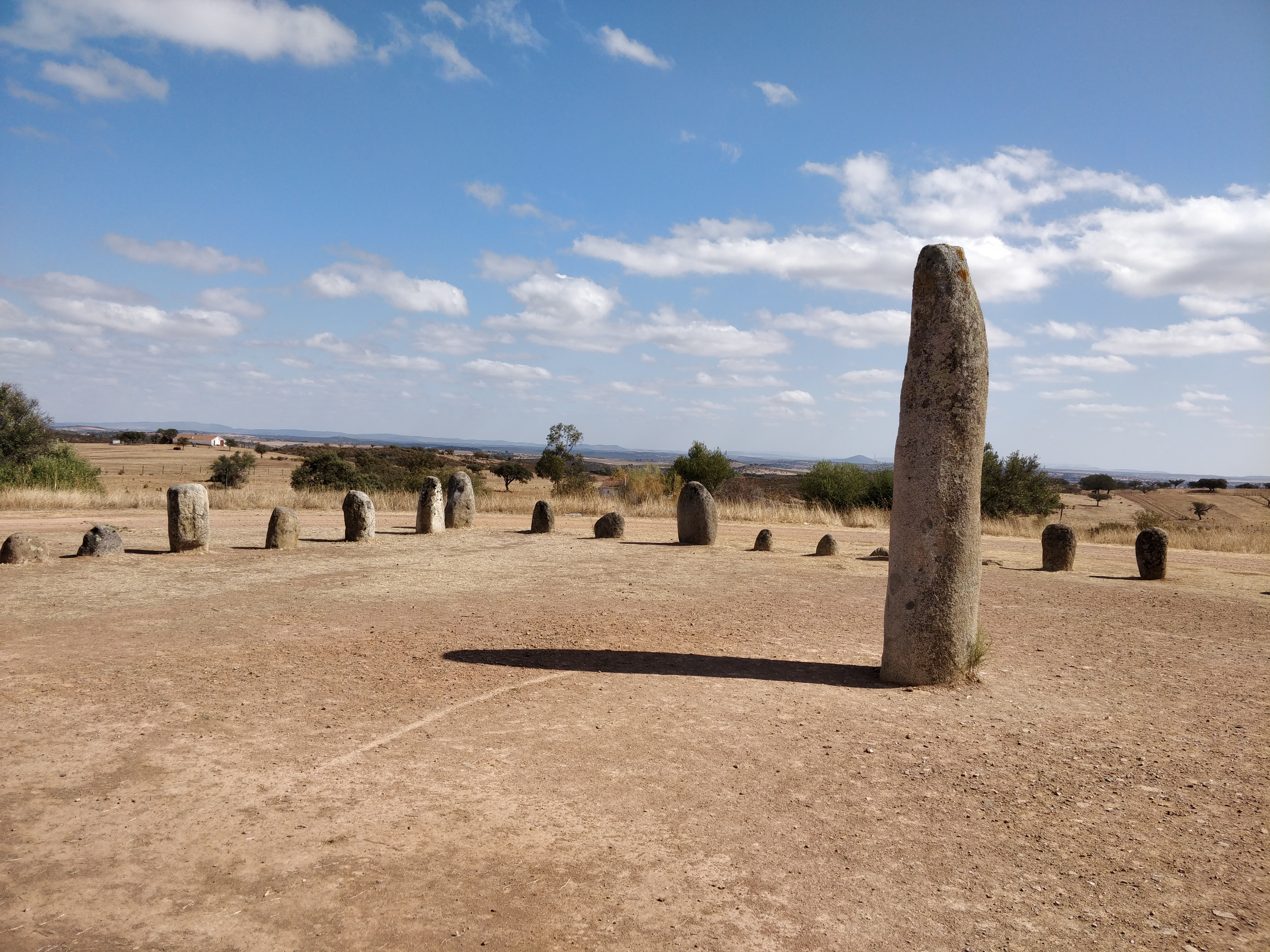
- A view of the cromlech
- Interactive map of Xerez Cromlech
- 38°27′12.4″N 7°22′15.6″W
- Type: Cromlech
- Periods: Neolithic
- Location: Monsaraz, Évora, Alentejo, Portugal

History
- Built: c. 4000 BC

Site notes
- Material: Granite
- Excavation dates: 1972, 1998
- Archaeologists: José Pires Gonçalves; Mário Varela Gomes
- Discovered: 1969
- Condition: Good
- Owner: Portuguese Republic
- Public access: Yes

The Xerez Cromlech (Portuguese: Cromeleque do Xerez), also known as the Xarez Cromlech, is a megalithic complex that is believed to date back to the 5th or 4th millennium BCE. It is situated near the town of Monsaraz, in the municipality of Reguengos de Monsaraz, in Alentejo region, Portugal, close to the Spanish border. The present site of the cromlech is not its original location. Due to the construction of the Alqueva Dam for hydroelectric and irrigation purposes, which led to the flooding of the original site from 2002, it was transferred from an area that is now under water to its present site close to the Orada Convent. The Xerez cromlech was removed from the original site in November 2001 and re-assembled at the present one in June 2004. This was the only monument to be moved, with the dam's reservoir leading to the disappearance of prehistoric art engravings and the Roman-era Castle of Lousa.

== Layout ==
Although it has much in common with megalithic stone circles, the Xerez cromlech is, in fact, a square. There has been some dispute about the authenticity of the square layout or even whether it is a cromlech at all. When first discovered, the stones had been widely dispersed due to agricultural work and an initial topographical survey only identified 12 stones that could be part of a cromlech, although the present layout has 55. As the original site is now under water it is unlikely that the dispute will ever be resolved. It is acknowledged that the square shape results solely from interpretations by José Pires Gonçalves (1908–1984), a general practitioner and an amateur archaeologist from Reguengos de Monsaraz, previously responsible for identifying the nearby Menhir of Outeiro, who identified the stones as a cromlech in 1969, having been alerted to the existence of the central phallic stone by two local residents, José Cruz e Leonel Franco.

== Menhirs ==
The 55 menhirs are of different types of granite of local origin. These are mainly between 0.37 and 2.1 meters in height, with varying shapes (ovoid, slightly flattened, cylindrical, sub-square, conical or polyhedral). Originally raised and put into position by Gonçalves and others in 1972, they are arranged around a large phallic menhir, which is about 4.5 meters high and weighs 7 tons. Seven menhirs, including the central one, are decorated with different motifs that show strong similarities to the designs identified in other monuments of the same type in the region, such as the better-known Almendres Cromlech.

== 1998 excavation ==
In 1998, as part of the efforts to minimize the impact on Portugal’s heritage resulting from the construction of the dam, Mário Varela Gomes of the New University of Lisbon (Universidade NOVA de Lisboa) excavated the site, identifying a diverse set of highly fragmented items, including lithic artefacts (trapezoids and flakes in silica, silicon shale, quartz and quartzite), and some fragments of ceramic containers, such as decorated cups. At the time, Gomes apparently saw no reason to contradict the findings of Gonçalves. The architectural complexity of the site, the decorations on some of the menhirs and the archaeological materials collected suggested use of the area in the Late Paleolithic, a first phase of construction of the site in the early and middle Neolithic, and redesign in the late Neolithic (including placement of the central menhir). The complex is believed to have been used throughout the Chalcolithic.

== Transportation ==
In November 2001, three months before the dam's floodgates were closed, the whole complex was dismantled and the stones were stored for more than two years. The present location was chosen because of the availability of government land and the fact that there would also be room to build a planned archaeology museum, which remained unbuilt as of 2025. The reconstruction of the cromlech was carried out on 24–25 June 2004 to coincide with the summer solstice.
