= Castle of Esporão =

Castle in the district of Évora, Portugal

Coordinates: 38.3983639°N 7.5534546°W

The Castle of Esporão (Portuguese: Castelo de Esporão) is a medieval castle in the civil parish of Reguengos de Monsaraz, municipality of Reguengos de Monsaraz, district of Évora.

It is classified by IGESPAR (now DGPC) as a Site of Public Interest.

== History ==
The earliest documented references to the Herdade do Esporão date to the thirteenth century, when the property belonged to Soeiro Rodrigues, a judge of Évora, with its boundaries formally defined in 1267. In 1427 the estate's morgadio (entailed estate) was established by D. Teresa Anes da Fonseca, wife of Fernão Lopes Lobo. The tower itself was most probably built on the orders of Álvaro Mendes de Vasconcelos, a knight of the House of Bragança and governor of the city of Évoran, between 1457 and 1490, dates corresponding respectively to his taking possession of the estate and his death. This attribution is made by historian José Pires Gonçalves on the basis of the tower's architectural design. The tower is regarded as a symbol of late-Gothic Alentejo military architecture and was intended primarily as an expression of the family's rising social standing rather than as a fortification. In 1973 the Herdade do Esporão was purchased by Finagra, and in 2002 the company funded restoration works that substantially altered the tower's facades and interior spaces.

== Architecture of the tower ==
The tower has an unusual rectangular footprint, measuring 14.4 metres by 10.9 metres, making it comparatively wider than most contemporary constructions of its type. It is divided into three storeys, with windows symmetrically arranged on the upper floors. At ground level, the tower houses the Archaeological Museum of the Perdigões Complex (Museu Arqueológico do Complexo dos Perdigões), where artefacts recovered during excavations are displayed.

== Archaeological context ==
In 1996, during vineyard planting works on the estate, workers made an unintentional discovery of an archaeological site extending over more than 16 hectares, dating from the Neolithic and Chalcolithic periods, roughly between 3500 and 2000 BCE. This site, known as the Perdigões Archaeological Complex (Complexo Arqueológico dos Perdigões), is situated approximately 5 kilometres from the tower on a separate property, the Herdade dos Perdigões. The complex consists of concentric ditches cut into the bedrock, a megalithic ceremonial enclosure including several standing stones (menires), and a necropolis; it is considered one of the most significant prehistoric sites of its kind in Europe. Scientific excavations have been ongoing since 1997, led by ERA Arqueologia. In January 2019 the Portuguese Council of Ministers approved the classification of the Perdigões Archaeological Complex as a Sítio de Interesse Nacional (Site of National Interest), granting it the designation of National Monument (Monumento Nacional). The most significant artefacts recovered from these excavations, more than 200 items of high archaeological value, are displayed in the tower's ground-floor Archaeological Museum.
