= Alqueva =

Alqueva may refer to:

- Alqueva Dam
- Alqueva (Portel), a civil parish in the municipality of Portel
