= Amieira =

Amieira may refer to the following places in Portugal:

- Amieira (Oleiros), former parish in the municipality of Oleiros
- Amieira (Portel), former parish in the municipality of Portel
- Amieira do Tejo, former parish in the municipality of Nisa
- Amieira e Alqueva, civil parish in the municipality of Portel
