= Antas do Olival da Pêga =

Neolithic tombs in Évora district, Portugal

Olival da Pêga dolmens
- Antas do Olival da Pêga
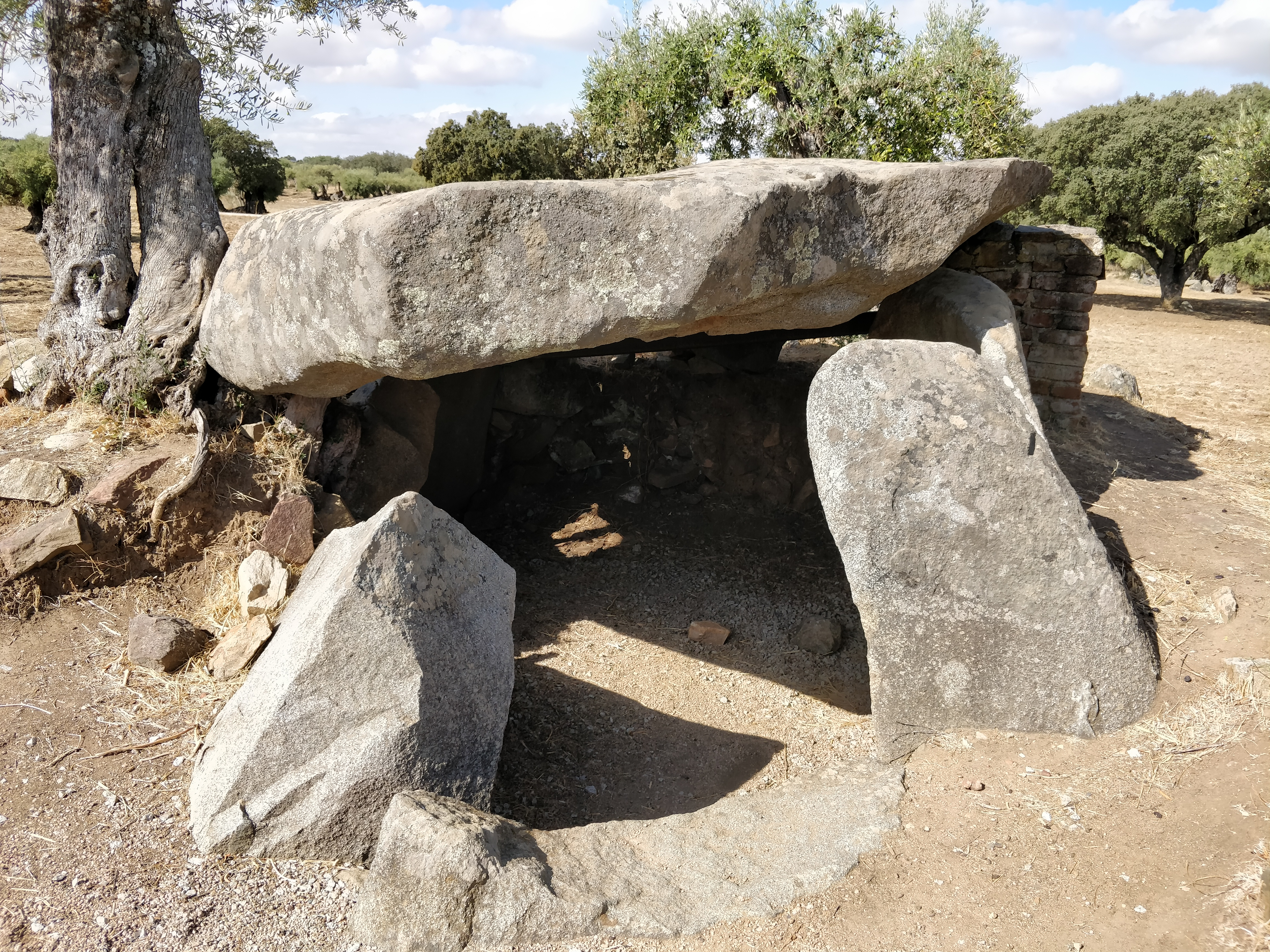
- Anta 2
- Interactive map of Olival da Pêga dolmens
- 38°27′05.6″N 7°23′56″W
- Type: Dolmens
- Periods: Neolithic
- Location: Reguengos de Monsaraz, Évora, Portugal

History
- Built: Anta 1: c. 2500 BC; Anta 2: c. 3250 BC

Site notes
- Material: Stone
- Excavation dates: 1990-1997
- Archaeologists: Georg and Vera Leisner; Victor Gonçalves and Ana Catarina Sousa
- Owner: Portugal
- Public access: Yes

The Antas do Olival da Pêga are 2 dolmens located near the village of Telheiro, in the municipality of Reguengos de Monsaraz, in Évora, Portugal. Anta is the Portuguese name for a dolmen, a single-chamber megalithic tomb. These two Neolithic dolmens were used over a long period, from the Late Neolithic to the Chalcolithic. The tombs were originally identified by German archaeologists Georg and Vera Leisner, who excavated Anta 1, with Anta 2 being subsequently excavated from the 1990s by Victor Gonçalves and Ana Catarina Sousa of the Centre of Archaeology of the University of Lisbon (UNIARQ). In addition to the visible stones at the two sites, which are about 300 meters apart, many items have been found as a result of excavations. Over one hundred people were buried in each tomb. The proximity of the two tombs gives rise to the conclusion that both were part of the same megalithic complex.

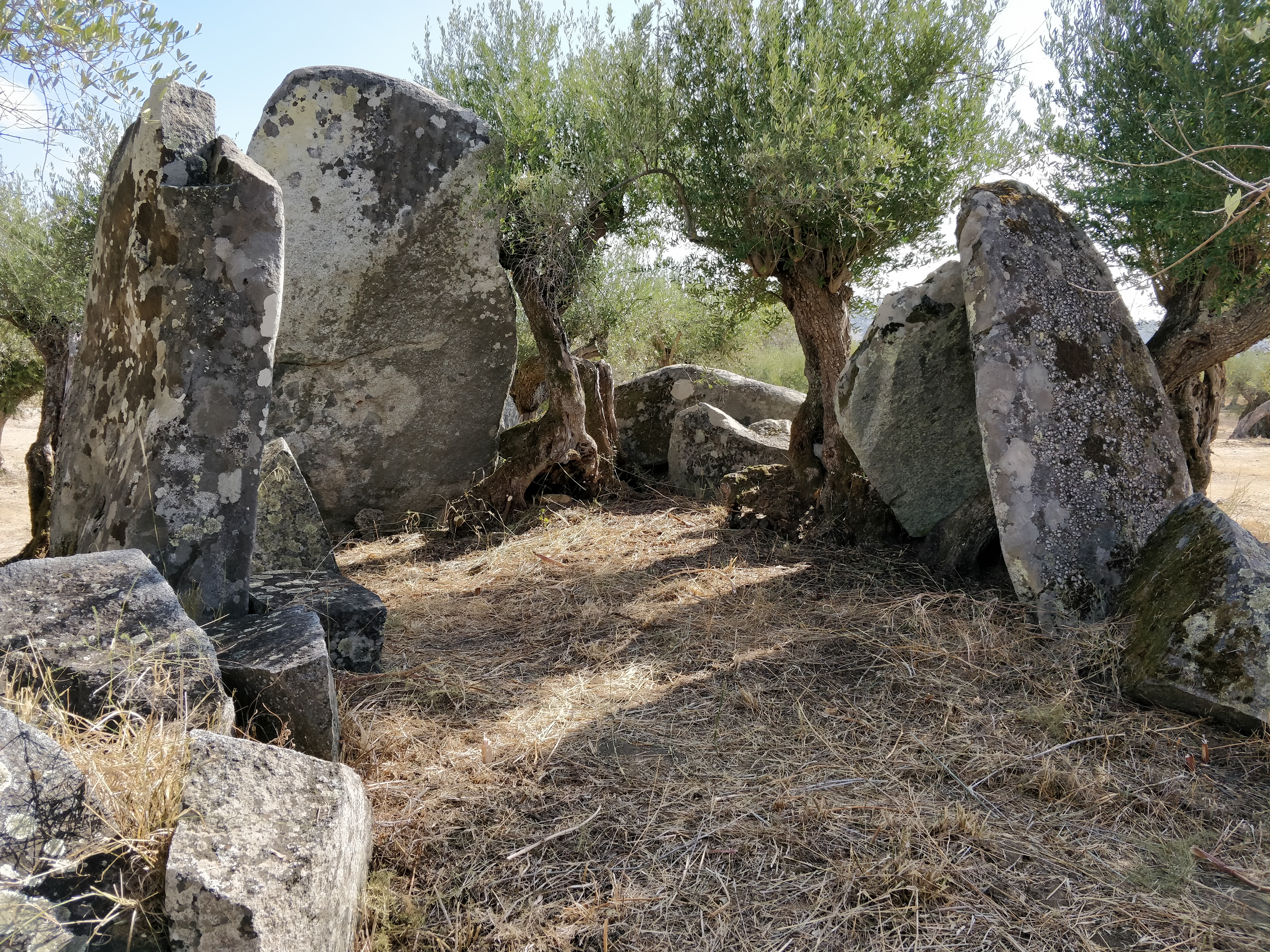
A view of Anta 1

== Anta 1 ==
Anta 1 is one of the tallest antas in Portugal. The tomb is polygonal with wide access. However, contrary to what is suggested by the very large chamber, the entrance corridor is relatively small. The Leisners found many artefacts, indicating the use of the tomb by a large community. They include necklace beads made of quartz and other materials in various shapes, bone figurines of rodents and rabbits, many ceramic fragments of up to 200 vases, with four showing decorations; 134 schist plaques; and a small idol in shale. They found two stelae in the hallway and a paved courtyard that suggested to them that the dolmen was from the 3rd millennium BCE. As their research progressed, four complexes were eventually identified.

== Anta 2 ==
At present, only the large burial chamber (3.40m X 4m in diameter) of Anta 2 is visible, with the capstone in situ. The anta was first reported by the Leisners in 1951, at which time they saw little evidence of the existence of remains. They did not carry out any excavations because of the weak support for the capstone and the consequent risk of breaking it.

It was thus not until the 1990s that excavations were carried out, by Gonçalves and Sousa, which enabled them to date the tomb from the end of the 4th millennium BCE. Given the findings at excavations at other dolmens in Portugal the results at Anta 2 were unexpected. Gonçalves and Sousa identified a 16-meter-long corridor, the longest in Portugal, that connected the anta with four other funerary structures made up of three beehive tombs, or tholoi, and a grave. The corridor appeared to have been built in two phases. In the second, two extensively decorated schist columns (not granite like the rest of the complex) were installed. They found two stelae in the hallway, as well as a paved courtyard. Many items, dating from around 2900-2500 BCE, were found in one tholos, including bones; flint, chert and rhyolite blades; arrowheads; dart tips; axes; polished stone artifacts; hair pins; necklace beads; ceramics; a copper dagger, and a bone figurine of a fox. Most of the items found are stored at UNIARQ.
