= Amieira (Portel) =

- Civil parish
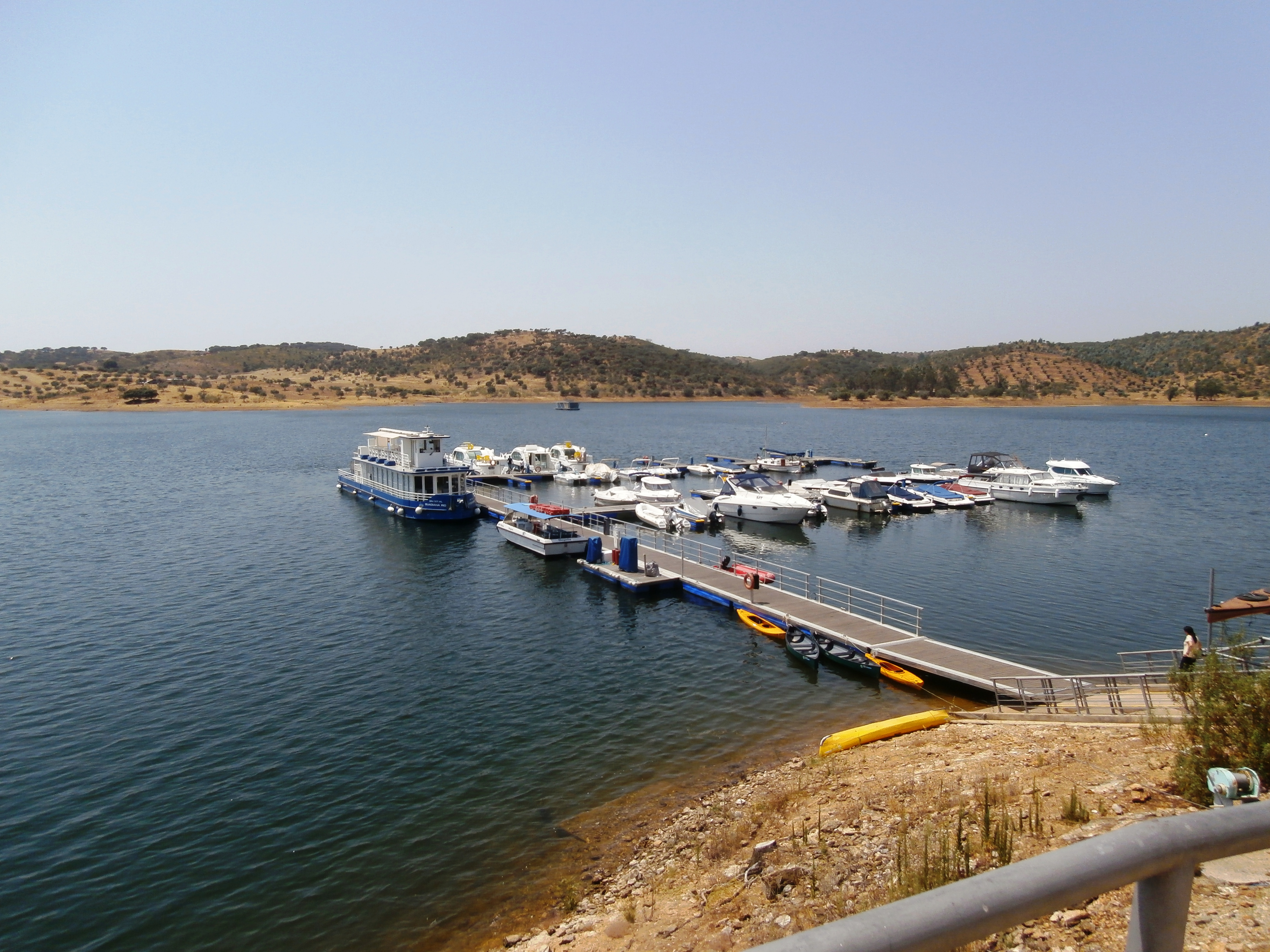
- Amieira Marina

- Location in Portugal
- Coordinates: 38°17′9″N 7°33′35″W
- Country: Portugal
- Region: Alentejo
- Intermunic. comm.: Alentejo Central
- District: Évora
- Municipality: Portel

Area
  - Total: 98.36 km^{2} (37.98 sq mi)

Population (2011)
  - Total: 362
  - Density: 3.68/km^{2} (9.53/sq mi)
- Time zone: UTC+00:00 (WET)
  - Summer (DST): UTC+01:00 (WEST)

Amieira is a former civil parish in the municipality of Portel, Portugal. The population in 2011 was 362, in an area of 98.36 km^{2}. On 28 January 2013, the parish merged with Alqueva to form the new parish of Amieira e Alqueva.

== Population ==
Population of the parish of Amieira
1864	1878	1890	1900	1911	1920	1930	1940	1950	1960	1970	1981	1991	2001	2011
597	662	743	759	868	857	954	1,097	1,069	943	778	614	505	436	362
