= Amieira e Alqueva =

Ameira e Alqueva
- Civil parish
- Location in Portugal
- Coordinates: 38.2863°N 7.5601°W
- Country: Portugal
- Region: Alentejo
- Intermunic. comm.: Alentejo Central
- District: Évora
- Municipality: Portel

Area
  - Total: 177.56 km^{2} (68.56 sq mi)

Population (2011)
  - Total: 691
  - Density: 3.9/km^{2} (10/sq mi)
- Time zone: UTC+00:00 (WET)
  - Summer (DST): UTC+01:00 (WEST)

Amiera e Alqueva is a civil parish in the municipality of Portel, Portugal. It was formed in 2013 by the merger of the former parishes Amieira and Alqueva. The population in 2011 was 691, in an area of 177.56 km^{2}.
