= Rocha dos Namorados =

Pagan site in Évora district, Portugal

- Pedra das Raparigas
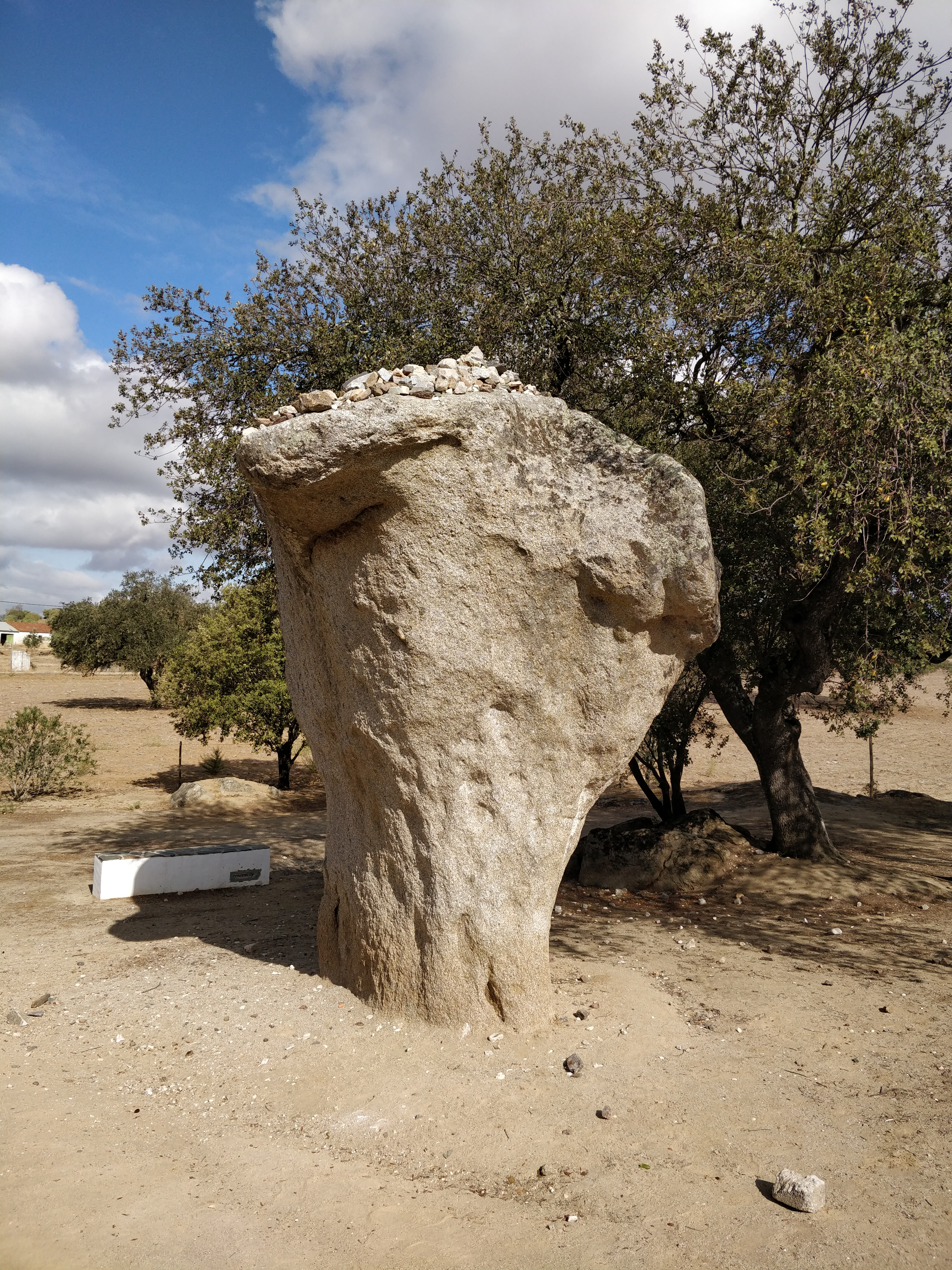
- Interactive map of Rocha dos Namorados
- 38°26′42.5″N 7°28′31.9″W
- Type: Rock outcrop. Site of a pagan fertility ritual
- Location: Corval, Reguengos de Monsaraz, Évora, Alentejo, Portugal

Site notes
- Public access: Yes

The Rocha dos Namorados (Lovers’ Rock) is a large upright granite stone located in the parish of Corval, municipality of Reguengos de Monsaraz, in the Évora District of the Alentejo region of Portugal. It is sometimes considered to be a menhir or standing stone but there is no evidence of it having been placed at the site and it seems to be a natural outcrop, although it does have some dimpled, megalithic engravings, as well as a cross, which is believed to have been carved in order to Christianise what was an ancient ritual. It is considered a rare example of the veneration of stones associated with a secular, pagan fertility rite that has continued to the present.

The stone is more than two meters high, and has a shape similar to that of a mushroom, with the top having a circumference of about 7 meters. Some consider that it resembles a womb. The fertility rite involves girls of marriageable age consulting the rock (as if it were an oracle) to find out how long before they get married. This consultation with the Rocha dos Namoradas is usually made on Easter Monday.

The legend is that the Lovers’ Rock was the meeting place of a young couple whose families hated each other. The young girl's father, suspicious of the existence of the relationship, followed her and asked her what she was doing there. The girl told him that she was throwing stones at the rock to know how long she had to wait to get married. She invited her father to do the same as he was a widower. In order for her lover, who was in hiding, to escape her father's wrath, she told her father that it would only work if he stood with his back to the Rock and threw the stones with his left hand. His first stone stayed in the Rock hat and the same year he married again.

The tradition is that on Easter Monday young single women should go to the rock and, facing away from it, throw three stones with their left hand. If the first stone stays on the top the woman will marry that year. If the second stone succeeds, she will marry the following year and if the third stone remains lodged she will marry in two years. If no stone stays on the top of the Rock the girl will have to return the following Easter Monday.
