= Alqueva (Portel) =

- Civil parish
- Location in Portugal
- Coordinates: 38°12′55″N 7°32′17″W
- Country: Portugal
- Region: Alentejo
- Intermunic. comm.: Alentejo Central
- District: Évora
- Municipality: Portel

Area
  - Total: 79.20 km^{2} (30.58 sq mi)

Population (2011)
  - Total: 329
  - Density: 4.2/km^{2} (11/sq mi)
- Time zone: UTC+00:00 (WET)
  - Summer (DST): UTC+01:00 (WEST)

Alqueva is a former civil parish in the municipality of Portel, Portugal. The population in 2011 was 329, in an area of 79.20 km^{2}. On 28 January 2013, the parish merged with Amieira to form the new parish of Amieira e Alqueva.

== Population ==
Population of the parish of Alqueva
1864	1878	1890	1900	1911	1920	1930	1940	1950	1960	1970	1981	1991	2001	2011
587	602	731	883	979	1,009	1,134	1,217	1,449	1,433	942	693	520	449	329
