= Castle of Lousa =

Castle in Évora, Portugal

Coordinates: 38°21′34″N 7°24′12″W

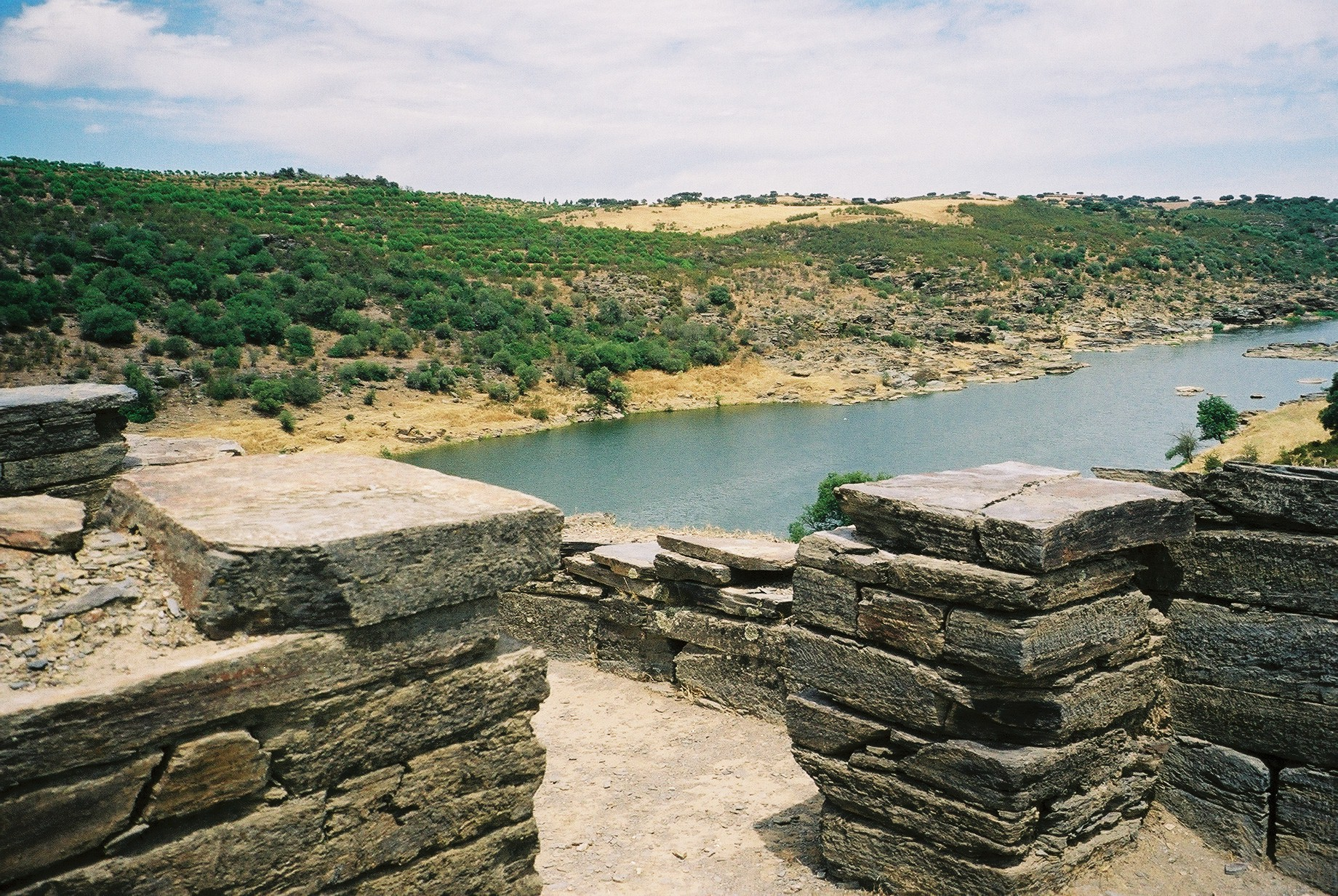
A view from the walls of the castle, in 2001.

Castelo da Lousa is a castle located in Mourão, Évora. It is classified as a national monument of Portugal since 1970.
