= Menhir of Outeiro =

Phallic monolith in Évora district, Portugal

Outeiro Menhir
- Menir do Outeiro
- Penedo comprido
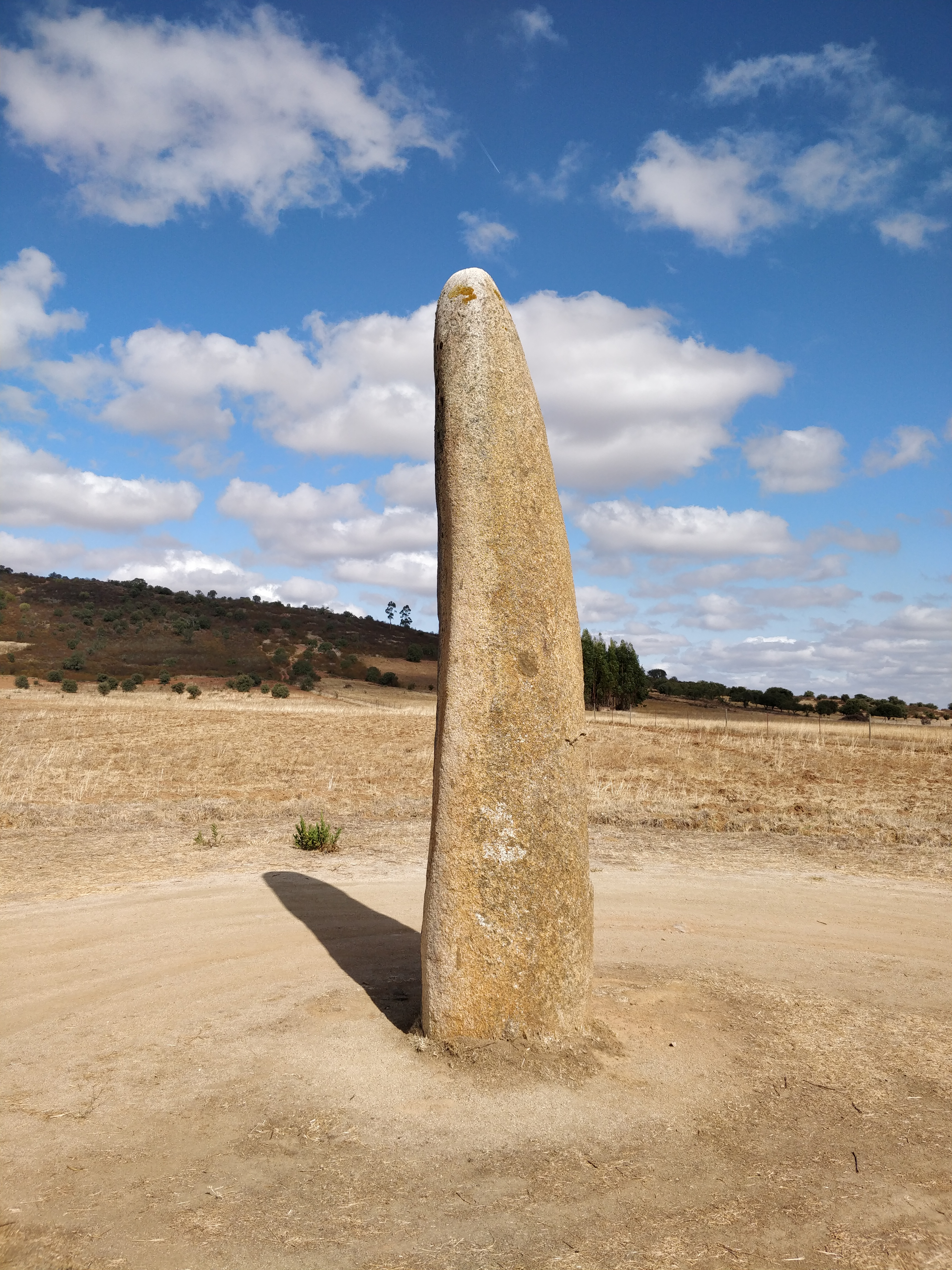
- A view of the menhir
- Interactive map of Outeiro Menhir
- 38°28′13″N 7°23′37″W
- Type: Phallic menhir
- Periods: Neolithic
- Location: Outeiro, Évora, Alentejo, Portugal

History
- Built: c. 4000 BC

Site notes
- Height: 5.6 m (18 ft)
- Diameter: 1 m (3 ft 3 in)
- Archaeologists: Henrique Leonor Pina; José Pires Gonçalves
- Discovered: 1969
- Condition: Very good
- Owner: Portuguese Republic
- Public access: Yes

The Menhir of Outeiro (Portuguese: Menir do Outeiro), also known as the Penedo Comprido (long boulder), is a megalith located midway between the villages of Outeiro and Barrada near the municipality of Reguengos de Monsaraz, in the district of Évora, in the Alentejo region of Portugal. It is a few kilometers from the Portuguese-Spanish-border. The stone was discovered on its side in 1969 by Henrique Leonor Pina and José Pires Gonçalves and, on the initiative of Gonçalves, was raised again around 1970. The menhir was classified as a Portuguese National Monument in 1971.

The granite monolith is 5.6 meters high with an average diameter of one meter, and weighs an estimated 8 tonnes. It is the second largest in Portugal. The top has a hollow of 30 cm in diameter, which is believed to represent a urethra, thus giving rise to the understanding that the megalith symbolizes a phallus. It is considered one of the best examples of a phallic menhir in the Iberian Peninsula. Based on its similarity to other megalithic finds in the Évora district, the menhir is believed to date from the Late Neolithic or Chalcolithic.

== See also ==
- List of menhirs
