= Portel, Portugal =

Portel
- Municipality
- Town of Portel
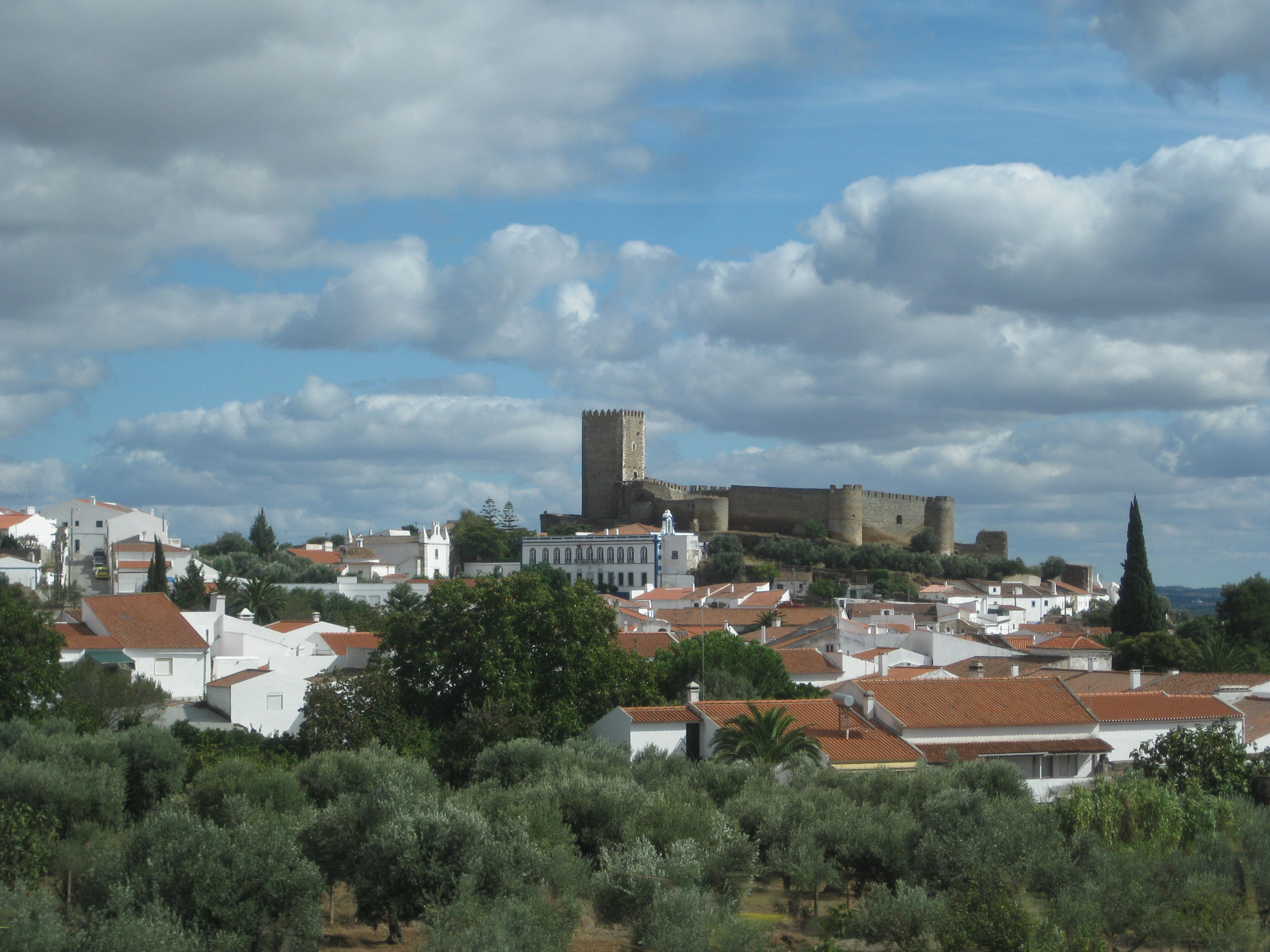

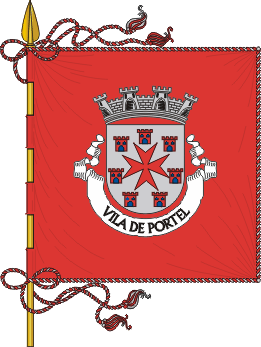
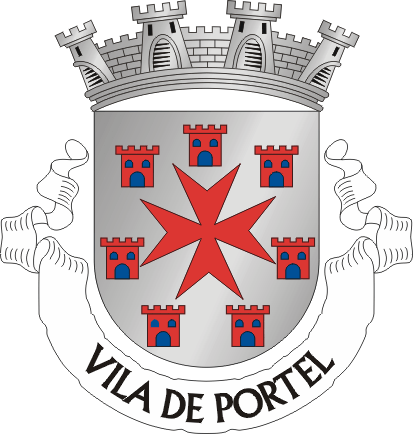
- Flag Coat of arms
- Interactive map of Portel
- Coordinates: 38°18′25″N 7°42′15″W
- Country: Portugal
- Region: Alentejo
- Intermunic. comm.: Alentejo Central
- District: Évora
- Parishes: 6

Government
  - President: José Manuel Grilo (PS)

Area
  - Total: 601.01 km^{2} (232.05 sq mi)

Population (2011)
  - Total: 6,428
  - Density: 10.70/km^{2} (27.70/sq mi)
- Time zone: UTC+00:00 (WET)
  - Summer (DST): UTC+01:00 (WEST)
- Local holiday: Easter Monday date varies
- Website: https://www.cm-portel.pt

Portel (Portuguese pronunciation: [puɾˈtɛl]), officially the Town of Portel (Portuguese: Vila de Portel), is a municipality in the District of Évora in Portugal. The population in 2011 was 6,428, in an area of 601.01 km^{2}.

The present Mayor is Norberto António Lopes Patinho, elected by the Socialist Party. The municipal holiday is Easter Monday.

== Parishes ==
Administratively, the municipality is divided into 6 civil parishes (freguesias):

- Amieira e Alqueva
- Monte do Trigo
- Portel
- Santana
- São Bartolomeu do Outeiro e Oriola
- Vera Cruz

== Gallery ==
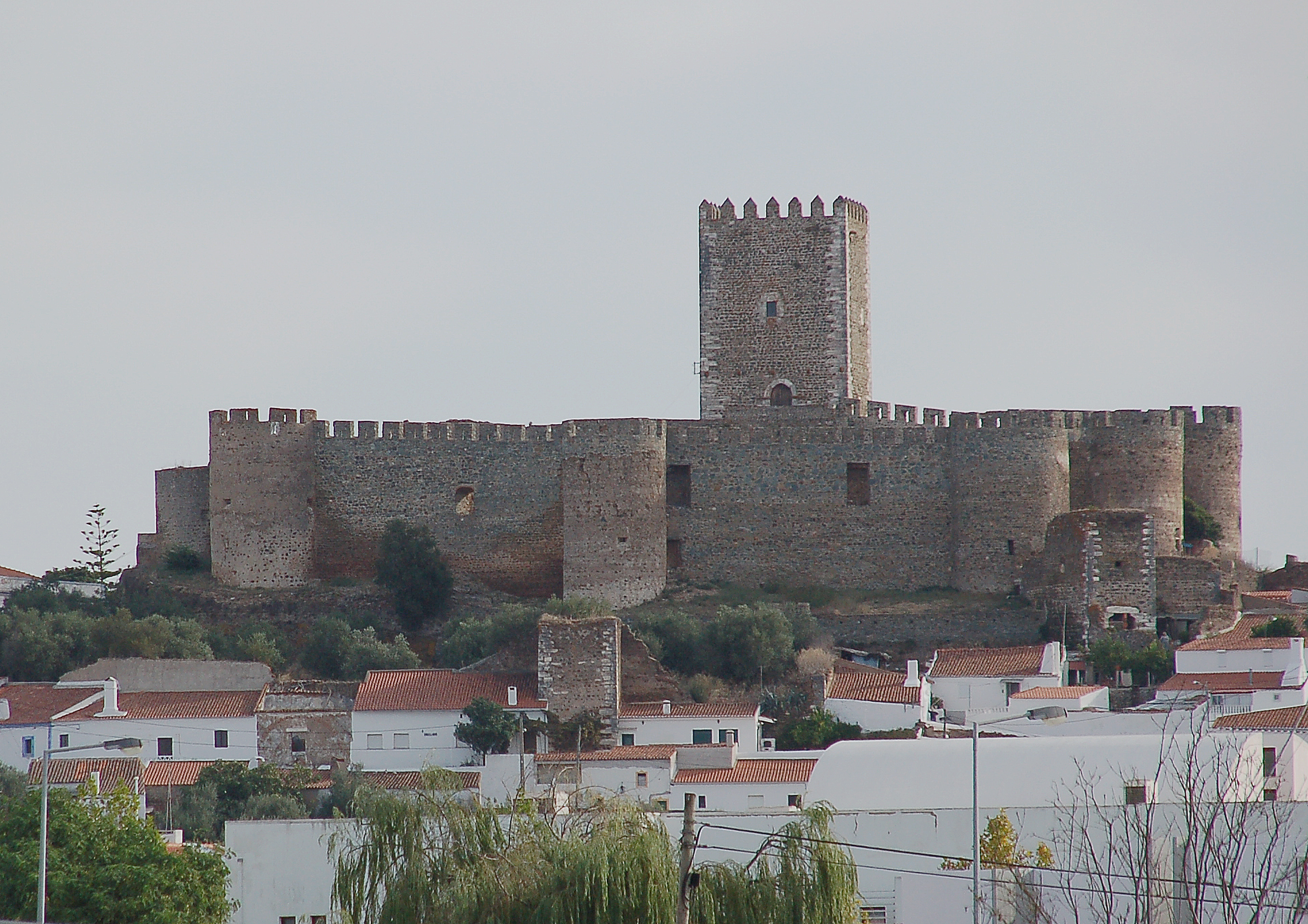
Portel castle.

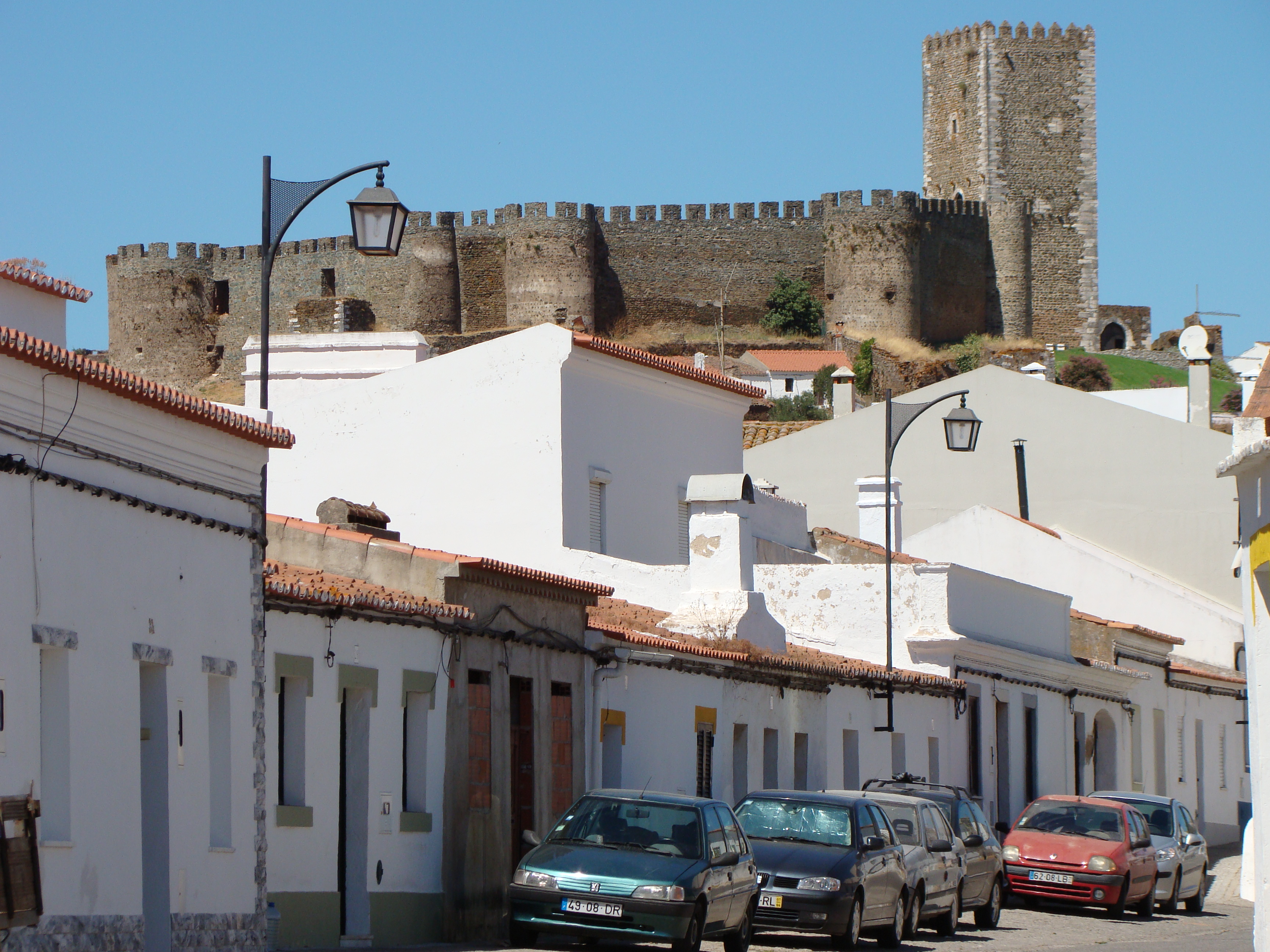
A view of Portel.

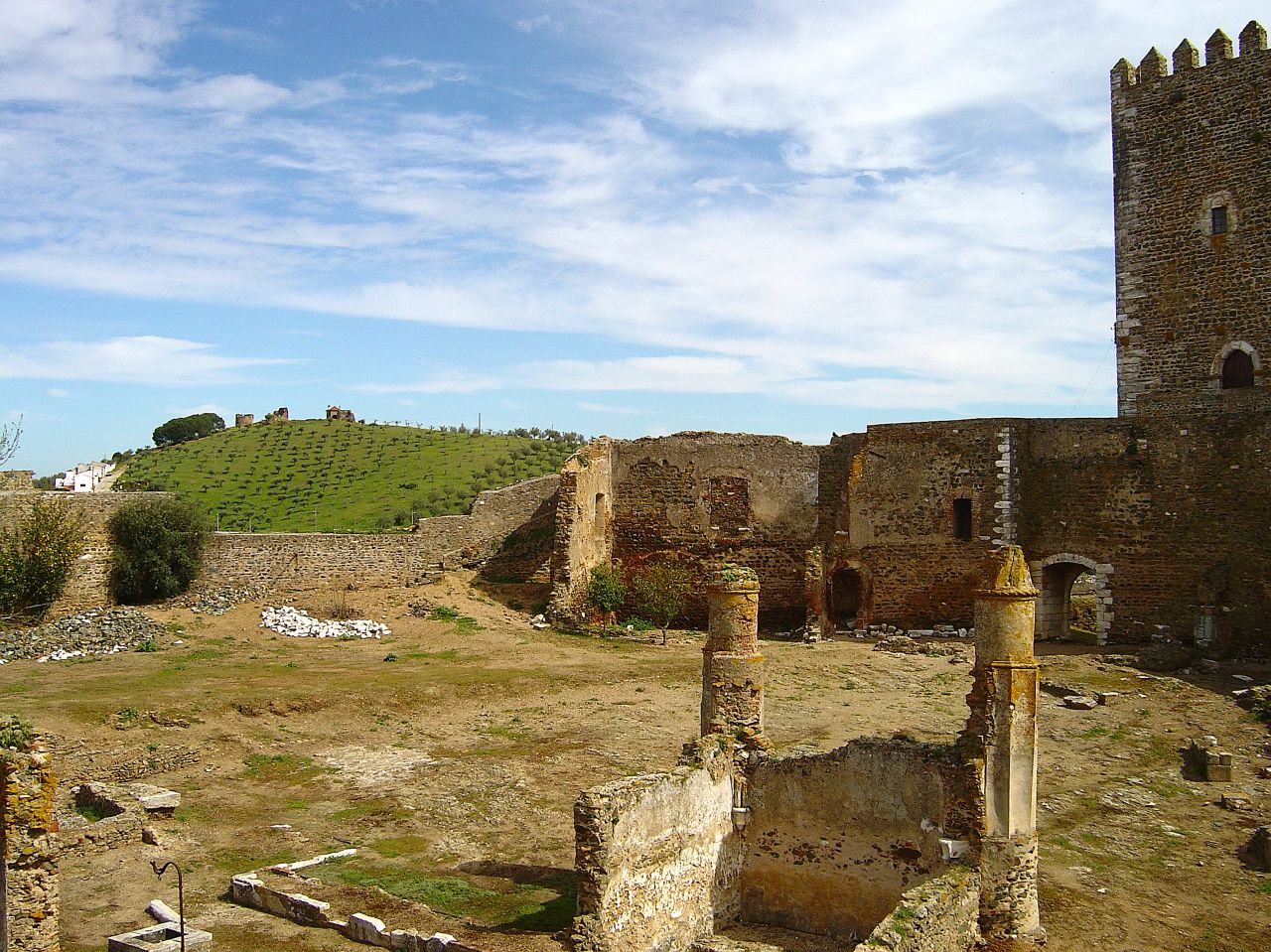
Castle ruins.

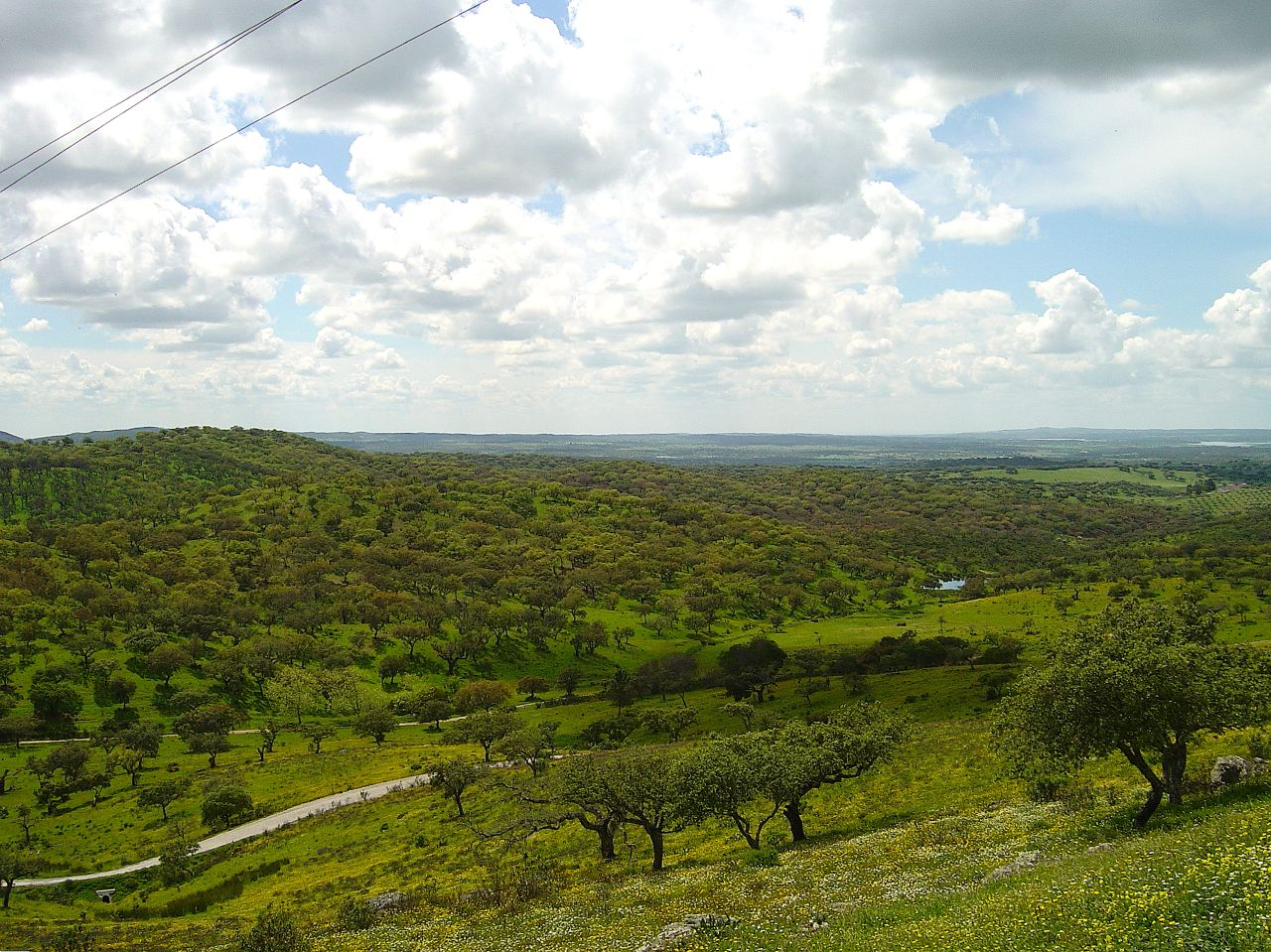
Typical savanna environment characteristic of Alentejo.

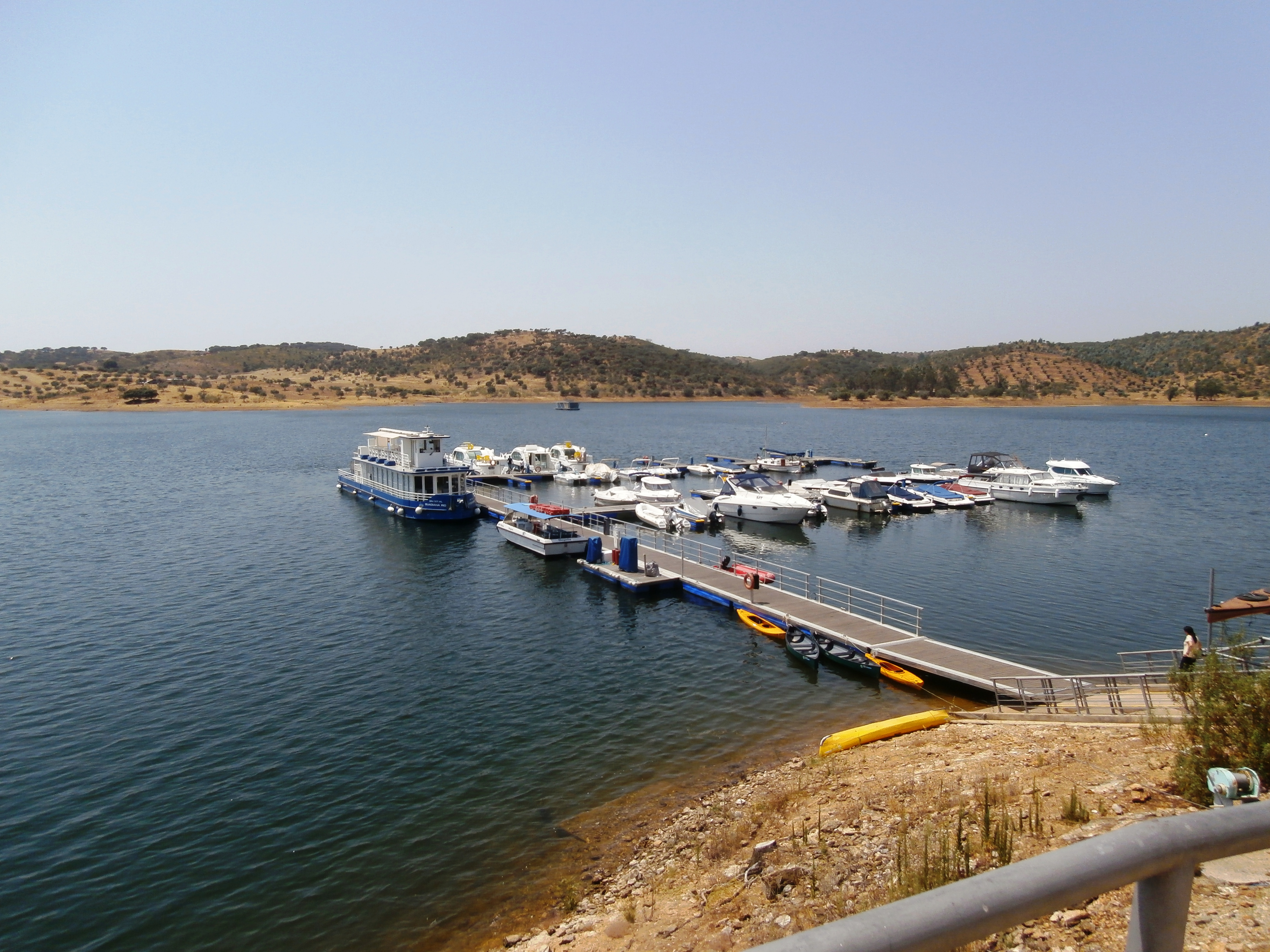
Amieira Marina in the Alqueva lake.

== Notable people ==
- Luís Zambujo (born 1986) a Portuguese former professional footballer with 311 club caps
