= Alqueva Dam =

Dam in Portugal

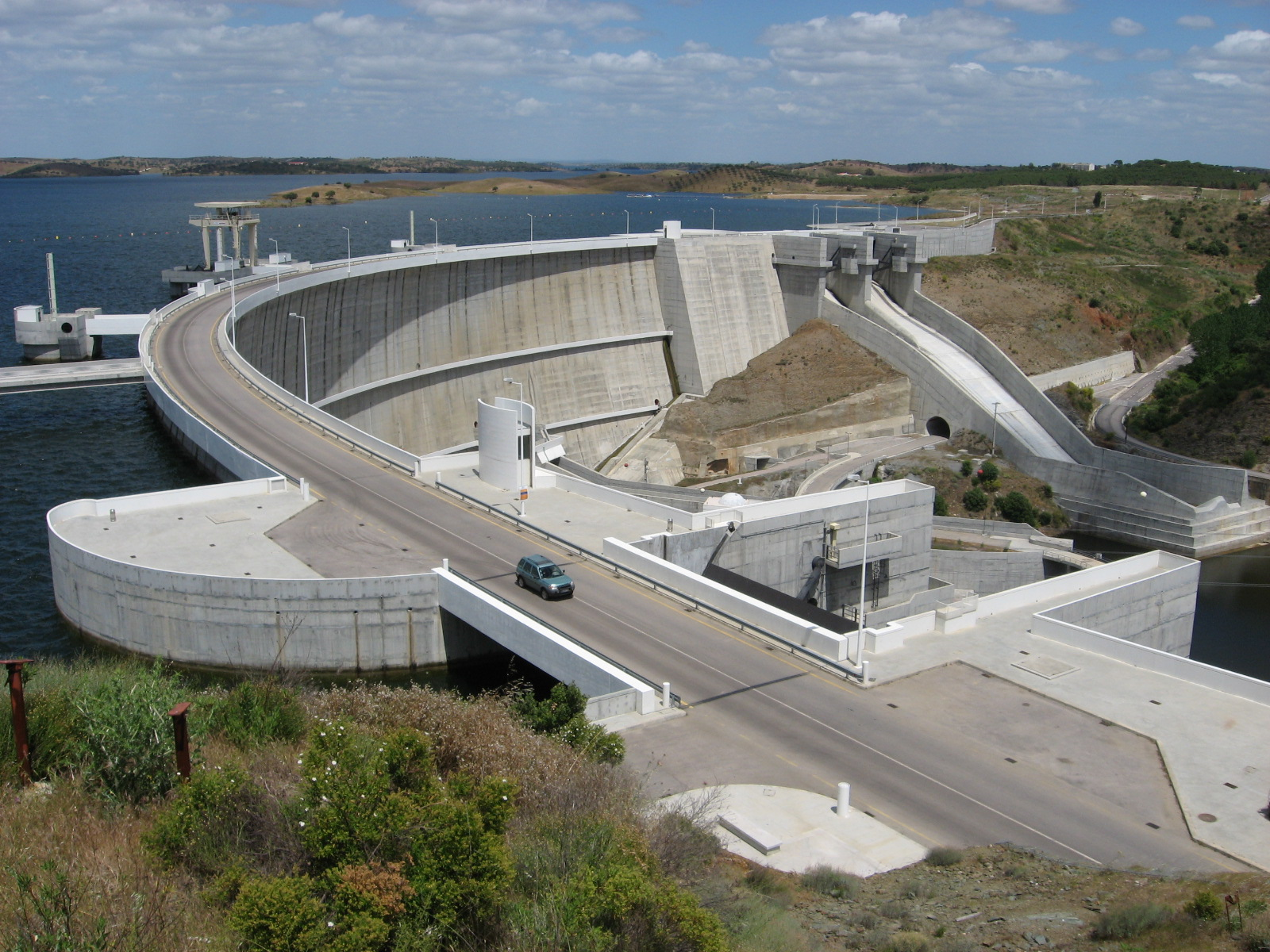
- Downstream face of the dam

- Location within Portugal
- Official name: Barragem do Alqueva
- Country: Portugal
- Location: Alqueva/Moura
- Coordinates: 38°11′51″N 7°29′47″W
- Purpose: Water supply, irrigation, power, tourism
- Status: Operational
- Construction began: 1995
- Opening date: 2002
- Construction cost: US$1.7 billion

Dam and spillways
- Type of dam: Arch
- Impounds: Guadiana
- Height: 96 m (315 ft)
- Length: 458 m (1,503 ft)
- Width (crest): 7 m (23 ft)
- Dam volume: 687,000 m^{3} (898,562 cu yd)

Reservoir
- Inactive capacity: 4,150,000,000 m^{3} (3,360,000 acre⋅ft)
- Catchment area: 250 km^{2} (97 sq mi)

Power Station
- Commission date: 2004, 2013
- Type: Conventional/Pumped-storage
- Turbines: 4 x 129.6 MW (173,800 hp) reversible Francis-type
- Installed capacity: 518.4 MW (695,200 hp)

The Alqueva Dam is an arch dam and the centrepiece of the Alqueva Multipurpose Project. It impounds the River Guadiana, on the border of Beja and Évora Districts in the south of Portugal. The dam takes its name from the town of Alqueva on its right bank. It creates a large reservoir with an inter-annual regulation capacity from which water may be distributed throughout the region. The dam was completed in 2002, and its reservoir reached its full level for the first time in 2010. The 518.4-megawatt (695,200 hp) power station was commissioned in two stages, stage I in 2004 and stage II in 2013. The Alqueva Dam is the largest dam and artificial lake (250 square kilometres (97 sq mi)) in Western Europe.

== History ==
During the 1950s, the Portuguese Dictator, António de Oliveira Salazar, ordered a study of the feasibility of the dam project. The potential benefits of the Alqueva dam were discussed for decades. An initial effort was undertaken after the Carnation Revolution of 1974, but it was abandoned in 1978. The Portuguese government eventually made a firm decision to build the dam in the 1990s, during the Cavaco Silva and António Guterres governments.

Aldeia da Luz, a small village that lay in the projected flood zone of the dam, was completely rebuilt on a new site.

The construction of the new dam was carried out by a joint venture of Bento Pedroso Construções, Cubiertas y MZOV, Dragados and Somague – Sociedade de Construções.

On February 8, 2002, the 96-metre (315 ft) high floodgates of the Alqueva dam were closed. In January 2010, the lake was filled to the planned level, with a surface area of 250 km^{2}. When filled to capacity, the shoreline of Alqueva Lake, also known as Grande Lago, is nearly 1200 kilometers and the maximum depth is about 100 meters. A well-developed commercial marina has grown up to the southeast of the town of Amieira, which provides all types of boating services.

== Hydroelectric power station ==
In 2004, the first stage of the hydroelectric power station was commissioned, with a capacity of 259-megawatt (347,000 hp). The second stage, with an additional 259 MW, was commissioned in 2013. The power station contains four 129.6-megawatt (173,800 hp) reversible Francis turbines. With these turbines, the power station is afforded a pumped-storage capability. Power is generated during high demand periods, and at times of low demand the turbines reverse and pump water from a much smaller reservoir below the dam back into the main reservoir. Pedrogao Dam forms the lower reservoir.

== Supporting infrastructure ==
Complementing the Alqueva dam, which is equipped with a pumped-storage hydroelectric plant, is the Pedrógão Dam, located 23 kilometres (14 mi) downstream from Alqueva beside the settlement of the same name and also equipped with a mini hydroelectric plant. The purpose of the Pedrógão dam is the creation of a lower reservoir for the Alqueva, for the recovery of flows, also serving as a source of water for the Ardila and Pedrógão water supply subsystems. The Álamos pumping station takes water from Alqueva and distributes it throughout the entire Alqueva water supply subsystem. Another two pumping stations, Pedrógão/Left Bank and Pedrógão/Right Bank, distribute water to the Ardila and Pedrógão subsystems respectively. The main infrastructure also includes the primary and secondary networks, pumping stations, intermediate dams, reservoirs and drainage and road networks.

On July 15, 2023, a 5 MW floating solar facility with 7.5 GWh production per year was unveiled, marking a significant development in Portugal's renewable energy infrastructure. The facility is positioned within the Alqueva reservoir, which is set to become one of Europe's largest floating solar parks. Spanning approximately 4 hectares, or 0.016% of the reservoir, the installation features nearly 12,000 photovoltaic panels.This installation is anticipated to supply energy to more than 30% of the inhabitants of the southern region of Portugal with the potential for expansion and the option to scale up to an additional 70 MW.

== Benefits ==
The goals of the Alqueva Multi-Purpose Project have been based on the principal shortfalls of the Alentejo region. The answers to these needs make up the project's main goals:

- The establishment of a strategic water reserve, with a capacity sufficient to meet all the needs of at least three successive years of drought;
- Guaranteed water supply to the population, industries and agriculture within the project intervention area;
- Amendment of the Cultural Agriculture Model, with the introduction of 120,000 hectares (300,000 acres) of a new irrigated crops in the Alentejo region;
- The production of non-polluting electrical energy using renewable sources;
- The preservation of the environment, monitoring and actively participating in the improvement of the same;
- The promotion of quality tourism by means of cooperation with public and private entities, the execution of Land Use Plans and systematic efforts to ensure the sustainability of the interventions;
- The creation of a new Corporate Climate, assuring the resource of "water", meeting the goals for the implementation of the project and helping to provide solutions for investment in the region;
- The dynamization of the employment market, a direct consequence of the other goals, is vital to the reversal of the main regional statistical indicators.

== Impacts ==
The dam caused the loss of prehistoric engravings and habitat of rare and endangered species including eagles, kites, wild boars, and the Iberian lynx. A Roman fort was also submerged.

The Alqueva Multi Purpose Project has a strong financial investment in impact mitigation plans. The archaeological intervention of about 1,200 cultural heritage sites is one result.

An environmental leader, José Paulo Martins, said the dam is a waste of money, as "the government's own secret reports say only 48% of the irrigated land can be worked profitably".

== Gallery ==
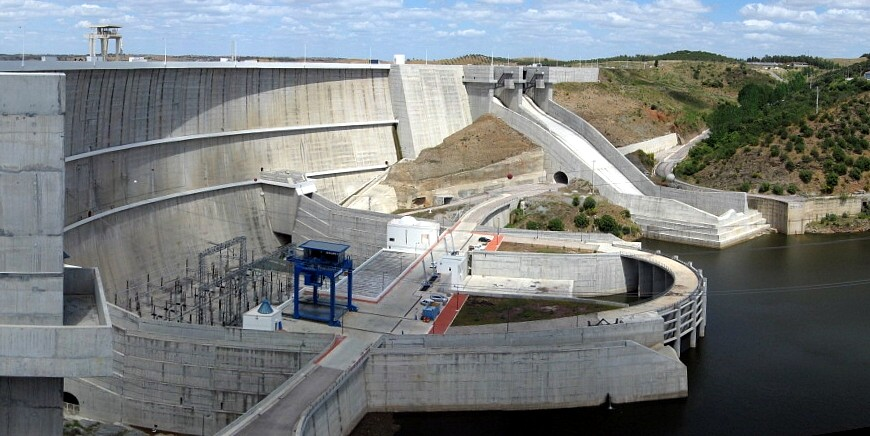
Panoramic view of dam and power station

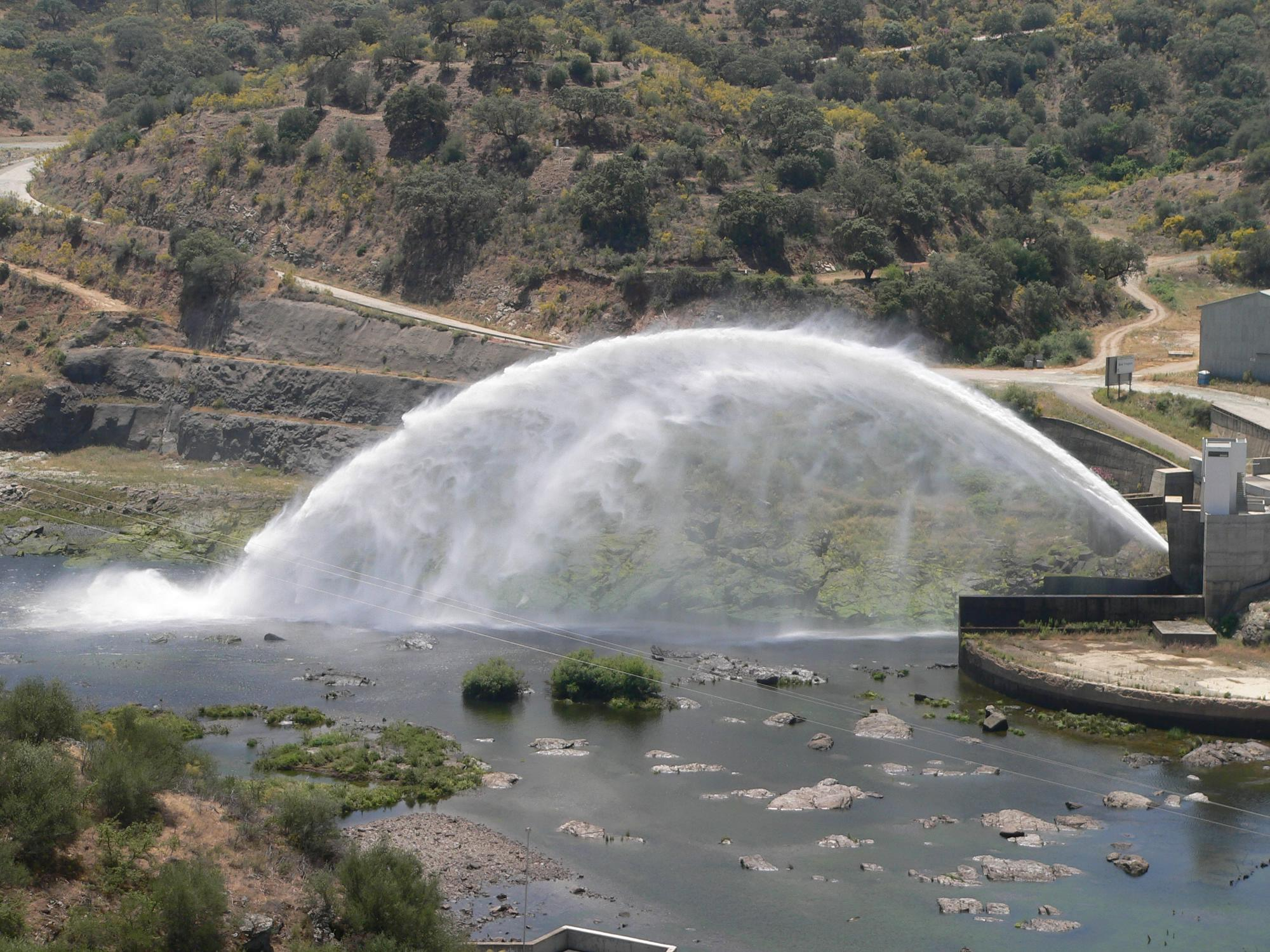
Jet from the flip bucket spillway
