= Reguengos de Monsaraz =

Municipality of Reguengos de Monsaraz
- Municipality
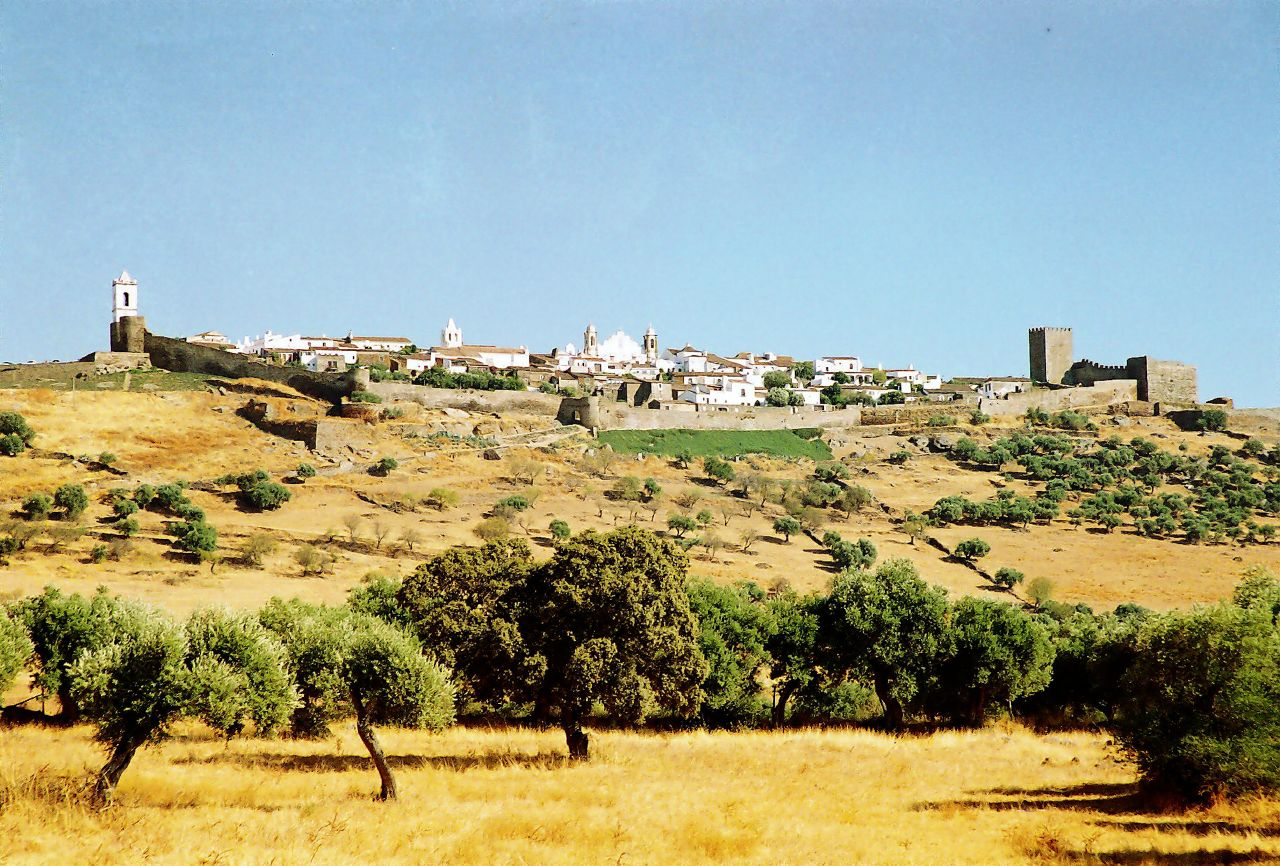

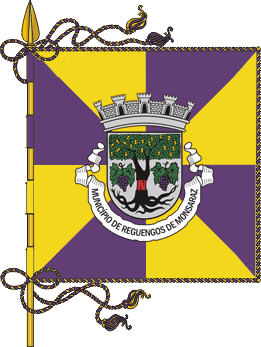
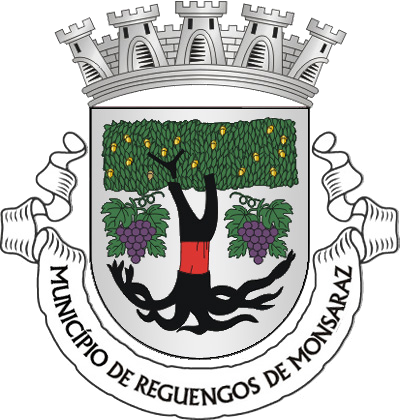
- Flag Coat of arms
- Interactive map of Reguengos de Monsaraz
- Coordinates: 38°25′N 7°32′W
- Country: Portugal
- Region: Alentejo
- Intermunic. comm.: Alentejo Central
- District: Évora
- Parishes: 4

Government
  - President: Marta Sofia da Silva Chilrito Prates ( PSD)

Area
  - Total: 464.00 km^{2} (179.15 sq mi)

Population (2011)
  - Total: 10,828
  - Density: 23.336/km^{2} (60.440/sq mi)
- Time zone: UTC+00:00 (WET)
  - Summer (DST): UTC+01:00 (WEST)
- Local holiday: Saint Anthony; June 13
- Website: www.cm-reguengos-monsaraz.pt

Reguengos de Monsaraz (European Portuguese pronunciation: [rɨˈɣẽɡuʒ ðɨ mõsɐˈɾaʃ]), officially the Municipality of Reguengos de Monsaraz (Portuguese: Município de Reguengos de Monsaraz), is a municipality in Évora District in Portugal. The population in 2011 was 10,828, in an area of 464.00 km^{2}. The City of Reguengos de Monsaraz proper has a population of 7,308.

The present Mayor is Marta Prates, elected by the Social Democratic Party. The municipal holiday is June 13.

Reguengos de Monsaraz is the second largest city in the district of Évora (the largest city in the suburban area of Évora), constituting one of the four municipalities that make up the suburban area of Évora, which are Arraiolos, Montemor-o-Novo, Reguengos de Monsaraz and Viana of the Alentejo.

== Parishes ==
Administratively, the municipality is divided into 4 civil parishes (freguesias):

- Campo e Campinho
- Corval
- Monsaraz
- Reguengos de Monsaraz

== Climate ==
Climate data for Reguengos de Monsaraz, 1990-2021, altitude: 218 m (715 ft)
Month	Jan	Feb	Mar	Apr	May	Jun	Jul	Aug	Sep	Oct	Nov	Dec	Year
Average precipitation mm (inches)	52.6 (2.07)	38.0 (1.50)	34.5 (1.36)	46.5 (1.83)	36.0 (1.42)	8.3 (0.33)	2.6 (0.10)	3.5 (0.14)	18.9 (0.74)	64.9 (2.56)	57.5 (2.26)	67.3 (2.65)	430.6 (16.96)
Source: Portuguese Environment Agency

== Tourism ==
The history of Reguengos is closely linked to that of Monsaraz, an ancient village that is the seat of a municipality that is one of the most beautiful and well-known localities in Alentejo. Around Monsaraz there are numerous megalithic vestiges that demonstrate the occupation of this region since ancient times.

The region is also known for the quality of its nationally recognized handicrafts, such as the pottery of São Pedro do Corval, the country's first pottery center, and the famous Reguengos blankets.

In addition to the rich surroundings, the Mother Church built in honor of Santo António in 1887, whose design was the responsibility of the architect António José Dias da Silva, author of the Praça de Toros de Campo Pequeno in Lisbon, was also projected in the city of reguengos. a building with characteristics of the romantic spirit of the Gothic-Manueline era.

Due to its proximity to the Alqueva reservoir, the megalithic heritage, its handicrafts and its wines, Reguengos de Monsaraz is today a city of great tourist interest, which has led to a significant development in recent years.

Some Points of interest:

Santo António Mother Church; Downtown; Herdade do Esporão; city's park

== Gallery ==
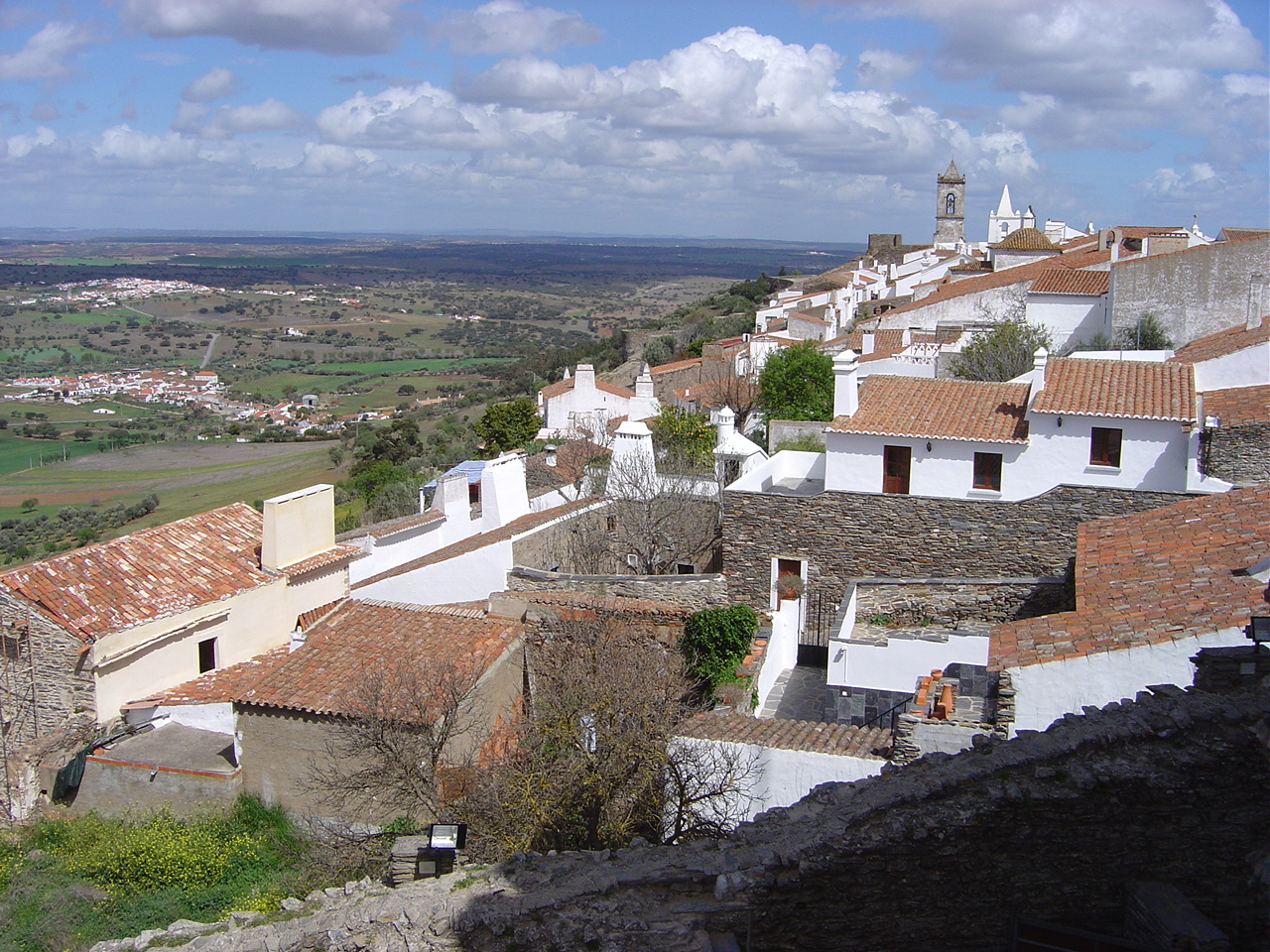
The town.

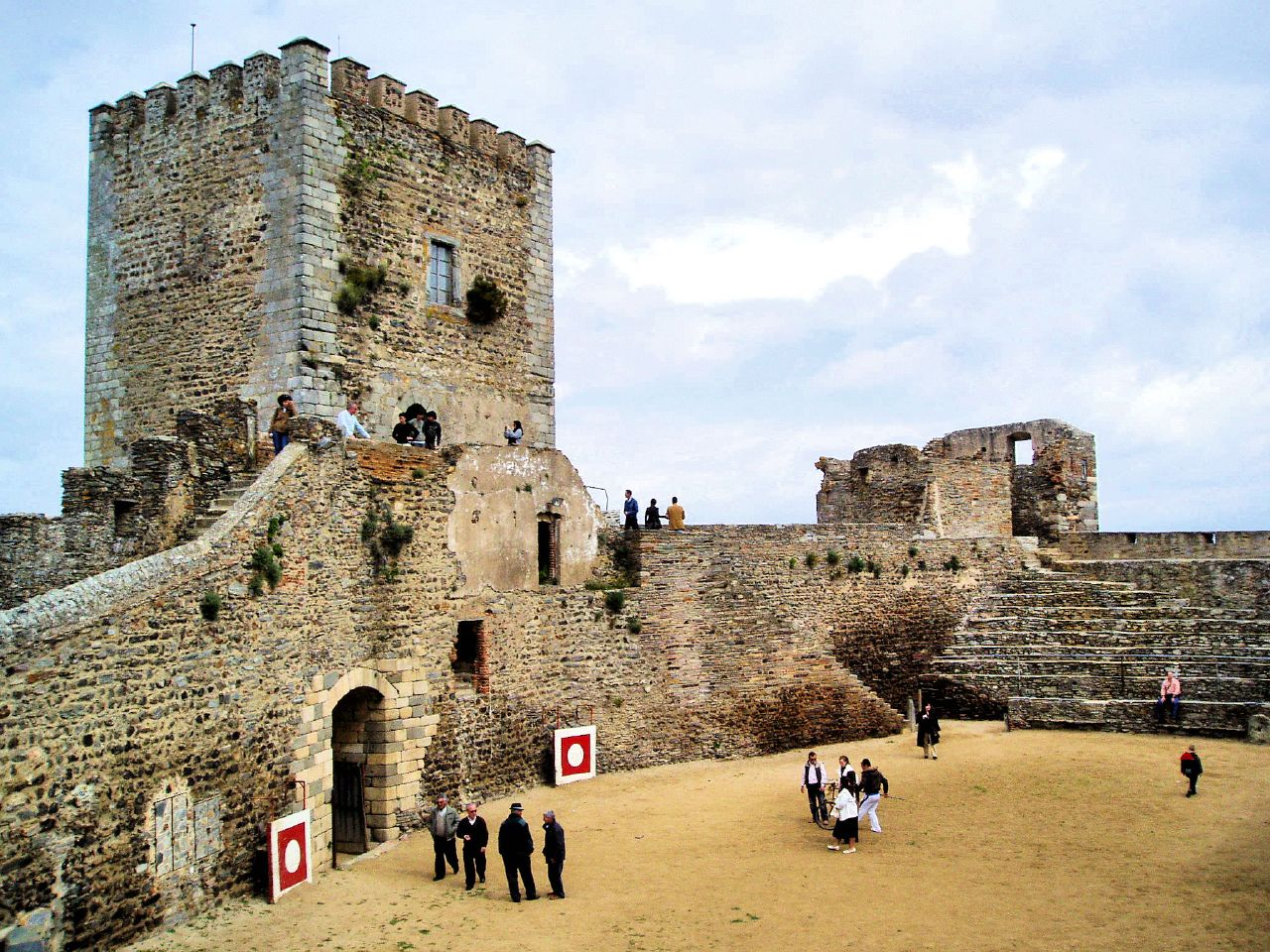
The castle.

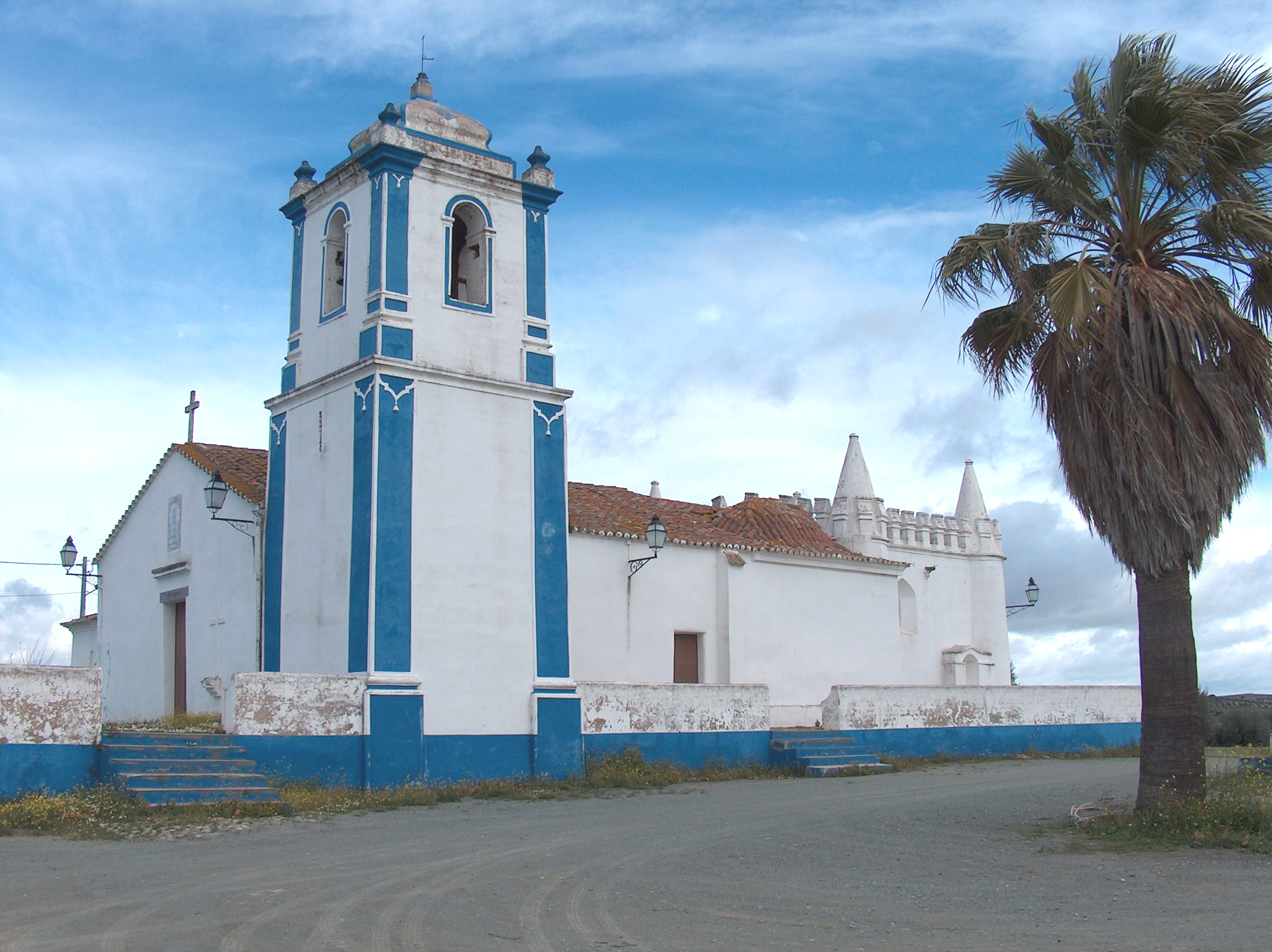
Local church.

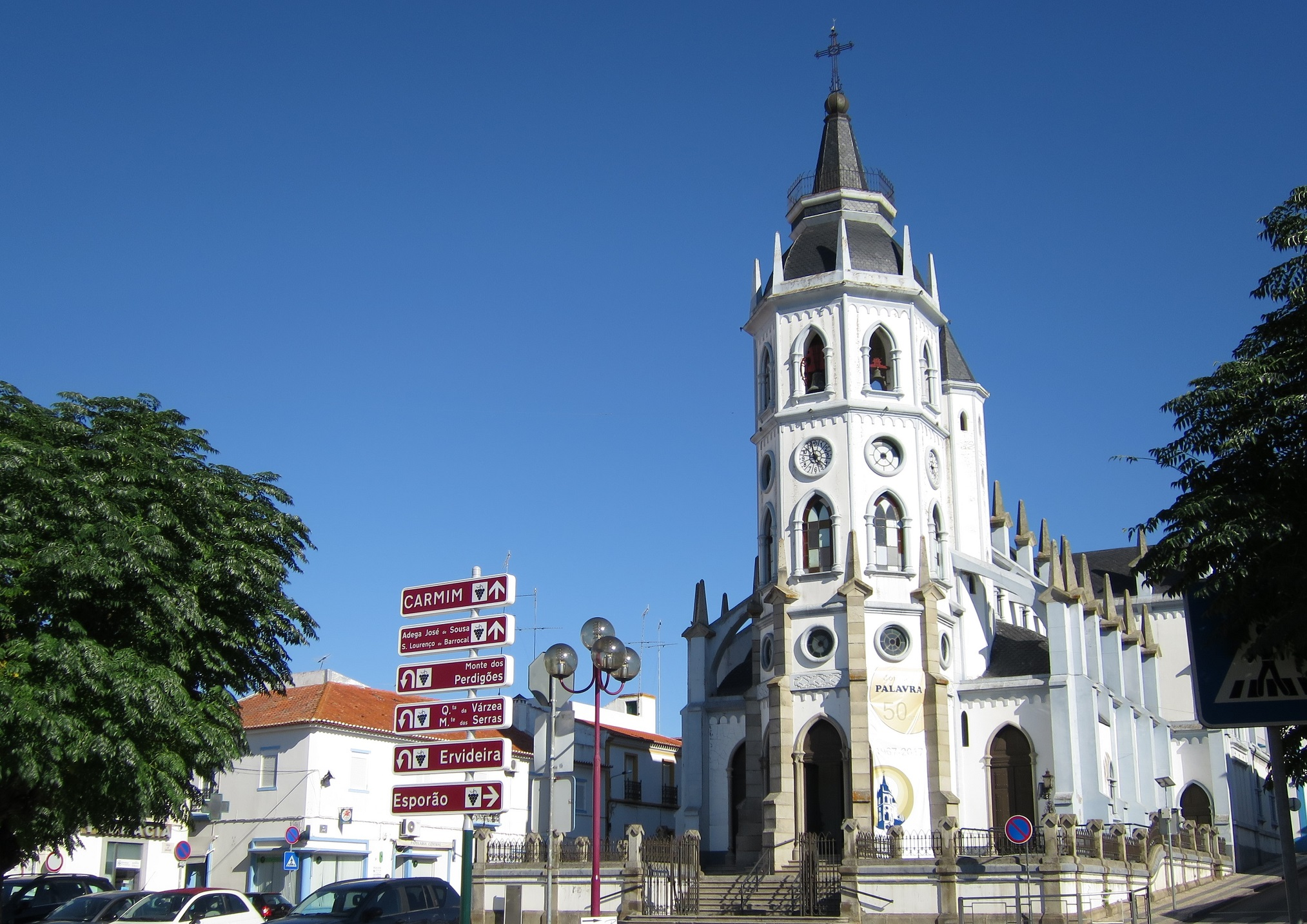
Santo António church.

== See also ==
- Reguengos DOC, a Portuguese wine region
- Xerez Cromlech, a megalithic complex dating back to the 4th or 5th century BC
