= Évora District =

District of Portugal

Coordinates: 38°34′12″N 7°54′36″W

District of Évora Distrito de Évora (Portuguese)
- District
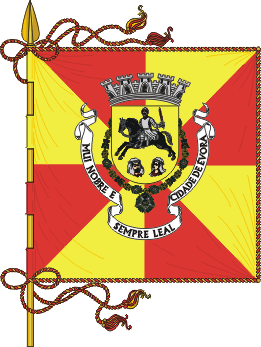
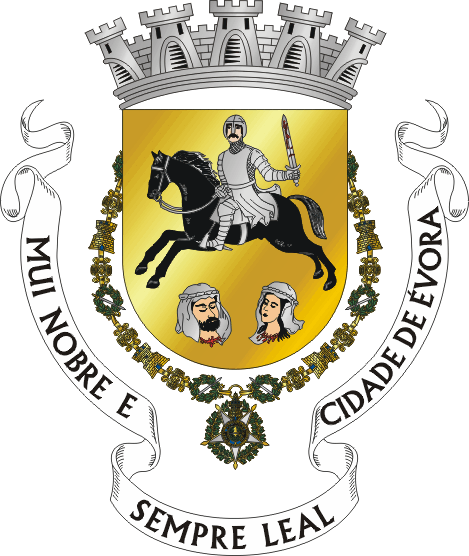
- Flag Coat of arms

- Country: Portugal
- Region: Alentejo
- Historical province: Alto Alentejo Province
- No. of municipalities: 14
- No. of parishes: 75
- Capital: Évora

Area
  - Total: 7,393 km^{2} (2,854 sq mi)

Population
  - Total: 173,408
  - Density: 23.46/km^{2} (60.75/sq mi)
- ISO 3166 code: PT-07
- No. of parliamentary representatives: 3

Évora District (Portuguese: Distrito de Évora [ˈɛvuɾɐ]) is located in Alentejo, in southern Portugal. The district capital is the city of Évora. It borders Spain.

== Municipalities ==
The district is composed by 14 municipalities:

- Alandroal
- Arraiolos
- Borba
- Estremoz
- Évora
- Montemor-o-Novo
- Mora
- Mourão
- Portel
- Redondo
- Reguengos de Monsaraz
- Vendas Novas
- Viana do Alentejo
- Vila Viçosa

All 14 municipalities is divided into 75 parishes or freguesias.

== Summary of votes and seats won 1976–2022 ==
Summary of election results from Évora district, 1976–2022
Parties	%	S	%	S	%	S	%	S	%	S	%	S	%	S	%	S	%	S	%	S	%	S	%	S	%	S	%	S	%	S	%	S
Parties	1976		1979		1980		1983		1985		1987		1991		1995		1999		2002		2005		2009		2011		2015		2019		2022	
PS	30.3	2	16.9	1	18.7	1	23.9	1	14.3	1	15.4		25.9	1	42.6	2	45.7	2	42.8	1	49.7	2	35.0	1	29.0	1	37.5	1	38.3	2	44.0	2
PSD	9.2		In AD				18.6	1	19.1	1	32.1	2	35.0	2	20.2	1	18.7	1	25.3	1	16.7		19.0	1	27.6	1	In PàF		17.5		21.4	1
PCP/APU/CDU	42.2	4	48.9	3	45.7	3	47.6	3	41.2	2	36.2	2	27.1	1	26.9	1	24.6	1	21.8	1	20.9	1	22.3	1	22.0	1	21.9	1	18.9	1	14.6	
AD			26.9	1	29.2	1																										
PRD									15.8	1	7.7																					
PàF																											23.9	1				
Total seats	6		5								4								3													
Source: Comissão Nacional de Eleições
