= European Portuguese =

Dialect of the Portuguese language

- Lusitanian Portuguese
- Português europeu Português lusitano Português de Portugal
- Native to: Portugal
- Native speakers: 10 million (2012)
- Language family: Indo-European: Italic; Latino-Faliscan; Latin; Romance; Italo-Western; Western Romance; Iberian Romance; West Iberian; Galician-Portuguese; Portuguese; European Portuguese
- Dialects: Northwestern; Northeastern; North East-Central; South East-Central; West-Central; Alentejan; Algarvean; Madeiran; Azorean; Oliventine
- Writing system: Latin (Portuguese alphabet); Portuguese Braille

Language codes
- ISO 639-3: –
- Glottolog: port1283
- IETF: pt-PT
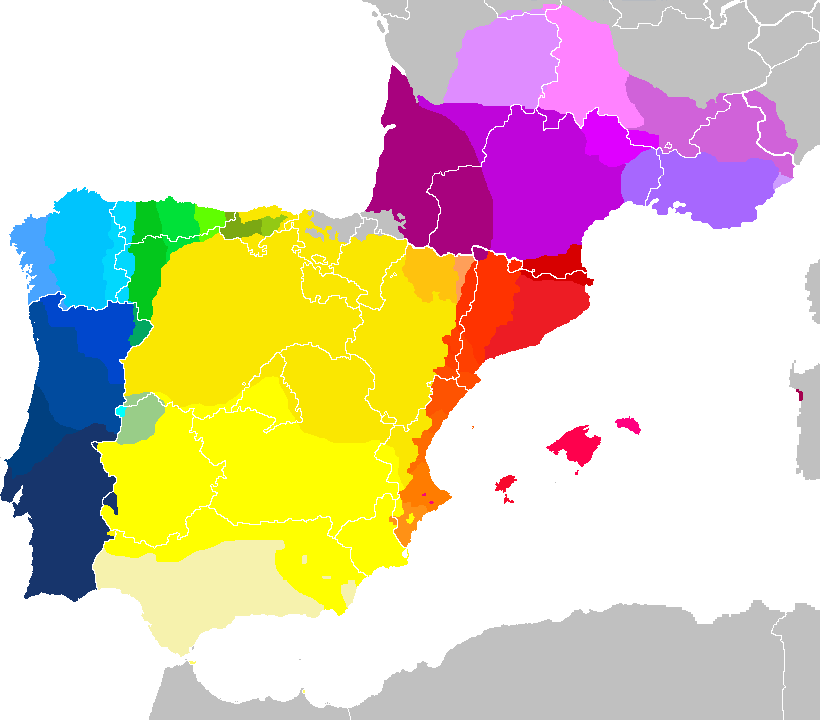
- Dialectical continuum of Iberian Romance languages including European Portuguese and its dialects.

Sara, a speaker of European Portuguese

European Portuguese (Portuguese: português europeu, pronounced [puɾtuˈɣez ewɾuˈpew]), also known as Lusitanian Portuguese (Portuguese: português lusitano) or as Portugal Portuguese (Portuguese: português de Portugal), is a dialect of the Portuguese language spoken in Portugal. The word "European" was chosen to avoid the reduplication of "Portuguese Portuguese" ("português português") as opposed to Brazilian Portuguese. "Peninsular Portuguese" (Portuguese: português peninsular) and "Iberian Portuguese" (Portuguese: português ibérico) are sometimes used, but they implicitly exclude the varieties of Portuguese spoken in Madeira and the Azores.

Portuguese is a pluricentric language; it is the same language with several interacting codified standard forms in many countries. Portuguese is a Romance language with Celtic, Germanic, Greek, and Arabic influence. It was spoken in the Iberian Peninsula before as Galician-Portuguese. With the formation of Portugal as a country in the 12th century, the language evolved into Portuguese. In the Spanish province of Galicia to the north of Portugal, the native language is Galician. Both Portuguese and Galician are very similar and natives can understand each other as they share the same recent common ancestor. Portuguese and Spanish are different languages, although they share 89% of their lexicon, the same percentage found in other neighboring languages in Europe, such as French and Italian.

== Phonology ==
=== Vowels ===
Oral monophthongs
	Front	Central	Back
Close	/i/	/ɨ/	/u/
Close-mid	/e/		/o/
Open-mid	/ɛ/	/ɐ/	/ɔ/
Open		/a/	

Nasal monophthongs
	Front	Central	Back
Close	/ĩ/		/ũ/
Mid	/ẽ/		/õ/
Open		/ɐ̃/	

Oral diphthongs
		Endpoint	
		/j/	/w/
Start point	/a/	aj	aw
Start point	/ɐ/	ɐj	ɐw
Start point	/ɛ/	ɛj	ɛw
Start point	/e/	ej	ew
Start point	/i/		iw
Start point	/ɔ/	ɔj	
Start point	/o/	oj	ow
Start point	/u/	uj	

Nasal diphthongs
		Endpoint	
		/j̃/	/w̃/
Start point	/ɐ̃/	ɐ̃j̃	ɐ̃w̃
Start point	/ẽ/	ẽj̃	
Start point	/õ/	õj̃	
Start point	/ũ/	ũj̃	

==== Vowel classification ====
Portuguese uses vowel height to contrast stressed syllables with unstressed syllables; the vowels /a ɛ e ɔ o/ tend to be raised to [ɐ ɛ ɨ ɔ u] when they are unstressed (see below for details). The dialects of Portugal are characterized by reducing vowels to a greater extent than others. Falling diphthongs are composed of a vowel followed by one of the high vowels /i/ or /u/; although rising diphthongs occur in the language as well, they can be interpreted as hiatuses.

European Portuguese possesses quite a wide range of vowel allophones:

- All vowels are lowered and retracted before /l/.
- All vowels are raised and advanced before alveolar, palato-alveolar and palatal consonants.
- Word-finally, /ɨ/ as well as unstressed /u/ and /ɐ/ are voiceless [ɯ̥̽, u̥, ə̥].

The realization of /ɐ/ in this contrast occurs in a limited morphological context, namely in verbal conjugation between the first person plural present and past perfect indicative forms of verbs such as pensamos ('we think') and pensámos ('we thought'). proposes that it is a kind of crasis rather than phonemic distinction of /a/ and /ɐ/. It means that in falamos 'we speak' there is the expected prenasal /a/-raising: [fɐˈlɐmuʃ], while in falámos 'we spoke' there are phonologically two /a/ in crasis: /faˈlaamos/ > [fɐˈlamuʃ]. Close-mid vowels and open-mid vowels (/e ~ ɛ/ and /o ~ ɔ/) contrast only when they are stressed. In unstressed syllables, they occur in complementary distribution.

According to Mateus and d'Andrade (2000:19), in European Portuguese, the stressed [ɐ] only occurs in the following three contexts:

- Before a palatal consonant (such as telha [ˈtɐʎɐ])
- Before the palatal front glide (such as lei [ˈlɐj])
- Before a nasal consonant (such as cama [ˈkɐmɐ])

In Greater Lisbon (according to NUTS III, which does not include Setúbal) /e/ can be centralized [ɐ] before palatal sounds (/j, ɲ, ʃ, ʒ, ʎ/); e.g. roupeiro [ʁoˈpɐjɾu], brenha [ˈbɾɐ(ʲ)ɲɐ], texto [ˈtɐ(ʲ)ʃtu], vejo [ˈvɐ(ʲ)ʒu], coelho [kuˈɐ(ʲ)ʎu].

==== European Portuguese "e caduc" ====
European Portuguese possesses a near-close near-back unrounded vowel. It occurs in unstressed syllables such as in pegar [pɯ̽ˈɣaɾ] ('to grip'). There is no standard symbol in the International Phonetic Alphabet for this sound. The IPA Handbook transcribes it as /ɯ/, but in Portuguese studies /ɨ/ is traditionally used.

- Traditionally, it is pronounced when "e" is unstressed; e.g. verdade [vɨɾˈðaðɨ], perigo [pɨˈɾiɣu].
- However, if "e" is initial, then it is pronounced [i]; e.g. energia [inɨɾˈʒiɐ], exemplo [iˈzẽplu].
- When "e" is adjacent to another vowel, it becomes [i]; e.g. real [ʁiˈal].
- However, notice that when the e caduc is preceded by a semi-vowel, it may become [e ~ ɛ] poesia [pwɛˈziɐ], quietude [kjɛˈtuðɨ].
- For the most part, unstressed "i" is not lowered to /ɨ/. However, when it is adjacent to a palatal consonant, [ɲ, ʎ, ʃ, ʒ], or to [i, ĩ] in the preceding/following syllable, it usually does become /ɨ/. E.g. ministro [mɨˈniʃtɾu], príncipe [ˈpɾĩsɨpɨ], artilhar [ɐɾtɨˈʎaɾ], caminhar [kɐmɨˈɲaɾ], pistola [pɨʃˈtɔlɐ], pijama [pɨˈʒɐmɐ].
- The Portuguese e caduc may be elided, becoming in some instances a syllabic consonant; e.g. verdade [vɾ̩ˈðað], perigo [ˈpɾiɣu], energia, [inɾ̩ˈʒiɐ], ministro [mˈniʃtɾu], príncipe [ˈpɾĩsp], artilhar [ɐɾtˈʎaɾ], caminhar [kɐmˈɲaɾ], pistola [pʃ̩ˈtɔlɐ].

There are very few minimal pairs for this sound: some examples include pregar [pɾɨˈɣaɾ] ('to nail') vs. pregar [pɾɛˈɣaɾ] ('to preach'; the latter stemming from earlier preegar < Latin praedicāre), sê [ˈse] ('be!') vs. sé [ˈsɛ] ('see/cathedral') vs. se [sɨ] ('if'), and pêlo [ˈpelu] ('hair') vs. pélo [ˈpɛlu] ('I peel off') vs. pelo [pɨlu] ('by the' + masc.), after orthographic changes, all these three words are now spelled pelo.

=== Consonants ===
Consonant phonemes
		Labial	Dental/ Alveolar	Palatal	Velar/Uvular	
		Labial	Dental/ Alveolar	Palatal	plain	labzd.
Nasal		m	n	ɲ		
Plosive/ Affricate	voiceless	p	t	t͡ʃ (Note: Merged into /ʃ/ in most dialects, though it is still very much distinguished in writing (see: chá (tea) vs. xá (shah)). Still occurs in select loanwords, as well as an allophone of the consonant cluster /tʃ/.)	k	kʷ (Note: /kʷ/ and /gʷ/ are alternatively interpreted as simple consonant clusters /kw/ and /gw/.)
Plosive/ Affricate	voiced	b (Note: In the Northern and Central dialects, word-medial /b/, /d/ and /g/ usually lenite to their respective fricative counterparts: [β], [ð] and [ɣ] (except after a nasal vowel, or when enunciating very clearly). At the end of a phrase, due to final-obstruent devoicing, they may even be devoiced to [ɸ], [θ], and [x] (for example, verde at the end of a sentence may be pronounced [veɹθ]).)	d	(d͡ʒ) (Note: Formerly an allophone of /ʒ/, has disappeared from virtually all dialects. Still occurs in select loanwords, as well as an allophone of the consonant cluster /dʒ/ in words like adjetivo.)	g	gʷ
Fricative	voiceless	f	s̻ ~ s̺ (Note: With the exception of a few conservative dialects (mostly in northern Portugal), most spoken varieties of European Portuguese have merged their lamino-dental and apico-alveolar sibilants one way or the other. Furthermore, in some dialects (chiefly the ones which lost their lamino-dental consonants) [s] and [z] become palatalized [ʃ] and [ʒ] before consonants or at the end of words. In any case, the orthography continues to fully uphold this distinction, helping distinguish between word pairs like maça (mace) vs. massa (dough) and coser (to sew) vs. cozer (to boil).)	ʃ		
Fricative	voiced	v (Note: Merged into [b]~[β] in some dialects, being most characteristic of the accents of Northern Portugal. Some linguists argue that this is the more conservative pronunciation, however, and instead other dialects might have experienced a split.)	z̻ ~ z̺	ʒ	(ʁ~ʀ) (Note: The uvular rhotic /ʁ/ (and its allophone [ʀ]) exists in free variation with the alveolar rhotic /r/ in the dialects in and around Lisbon and Porto (and to a lesser extent the Beira Litoral region, between the two). This "guttural R" was formerly considered non-standard, but its ubiquity in urban areas lead to its eventual acceptance as a valid allophone of /r/. Some linguists even consider it the "standard" pronunciation now, with [r] being a conservative, "rustic", allophone.)	
Rhotic	trill		r		(ʁ~ʀ)	
Rhotic	flap		ɾ			
Approximant	semivowel			j		w
Approximant	lateral		l (Note: /l/ becomes [ɫ] when at the end of a syllable.)	ʎ		

== Geographic variation ==
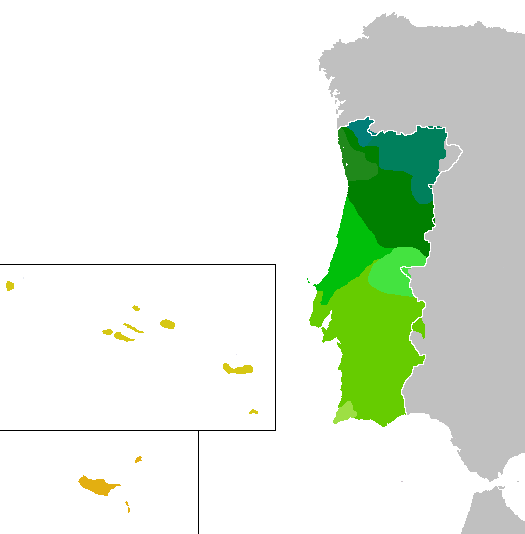
Dialect map for European Portuguese. Transmontano Minhoto Beirão Alentejano Alto-Alentejano Estremenho Açoriano/Micaelense Madeirense Algarvio Portuense

European Portuguese is divided into Northern and Southern varieties. The prestige norms are based on two varieties: that of Coimbra and that of Lisbon.

Phonetically, differences emerge within Continental Portuguese. For example, in northern Portugal, the phonemes /b/ and /v/ are less differentiated than in the rest of the Portuguese speaking world (similar to the other languages of the Iberian peninsula). Also, the original alveolar trill /r/ remains common in many northern dialects (especially in rural areas), like Transmontano, Portuense, Minhoto, and much of Beirão. Another regionalism can be found in the south and the islands with the use of the gerund in the present progressive tense rather than the infinitive.

Portuguese is spoken by a significant minority in Andorra and Luxembourg. There are also immigrant communities in France and Germany.

== Prominence ==
The Instituto Camões is a Portuguese international institution dedicated to the worldwide promotion of the Portuguese language, Portuguese culture, and international aid, on behalf of the Government of Portugal.

RTP is the Portuguese public television network and also serves as a vehicle for European-Portuguese-providing media content throughout the world. There is a branch of RTP Mundo named RTP África, which serves Lusophone Africa.

In estimating the size of the speech community for European Portuguese, one must take into account the consequences of the Portuguese diaspora: immigrant communities located throughout the world in the Americas, Australia, Europe and Africa.

== See also ==
- Portuguese language
- Acordo Ortográfico da Língua Portuguesa de 1990
- Macanese Portuguese
- Indian Portuguese
- Malaccan Creole Portuguese
- Galician Portuguese
- Cape Verdean Portuguese

== Works cited ==
- Barbosa, Plínio A.; Albano, Eleonora C. (2004). "Brazilian Portuguese". Journal of the International Phonetic Association. 34 (2): 227–232. doi:10.1017/S0025100304001756.
- Bisol, Leda (2005). Introdução a estudos de fonologia do português brasileiro (in Portuguese). Porto Alegre – Rio Grande do Sul: EDIPUCRS. ISBN 978-85-7430-529-5. Archived from the original on 27 April 2024.
- Cruz-Ferreira, Madalena (1995). "European Portuguese". Journal of the International Phonetic Association. 25 (2): 90–94. doi:10.1017/S0025100300005223. S2CID 249414876.
- Major, Roy C. (1992), "Stress and Rhythm in Brazilian Portuguese", in Koike, Dale April; Macedo, Donaldo P (eds.), Romance Linguistics: The Portuguese Context, Westport, CT: Bergin & Garvey, ISBN 0-89789-297-6
- Spahr, Christopher (2013). "Confronting the European Portuguese Low Vowel Distinction" (PDF).
