= Estremenho Portuguese =

Dialect of European Portuguese

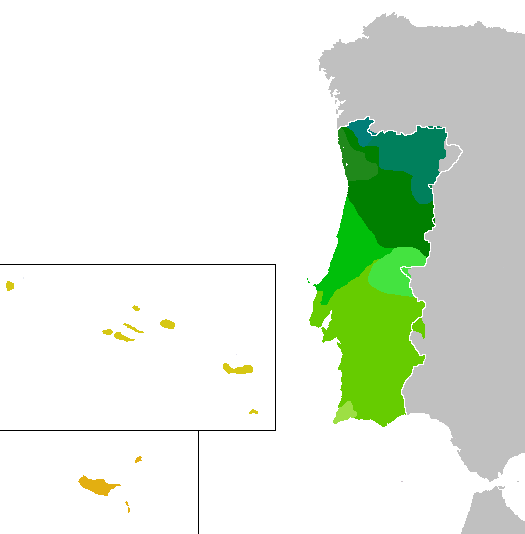
Dialects of Portugal.

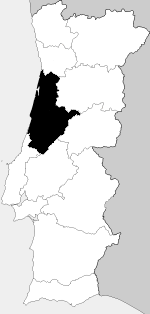
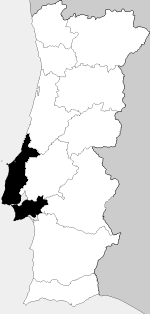
From left to right, the old provinces of Beira Litoral and Estremadura, now extinct.

Estremenho is a dialect of European Portuguese spoken in the former provinces of Estremadura and Beira Litoral and is part of the central-southern dialects.

The variety of Lisbon, which is used to form the basis for the pattern of European Portuguese, is within this dialect. The Lisbon dialect that serves as the basis of standard European Portuguese is the one used for official and written purposes in Angola, Cape Verde, East Timor, Guinea-Bissau, Macau, Mozambique, and São Tomé and Príncipe.

== Characteristics ==
The Estremenhan dialects present the following characteristics:

- A generalized monophthongization of the diphthong [ow]. For example, "touro" (bull) and "roupa" (clothes) passes to "tôro" and "rôpa".
- In certain subregions, such as saloia (the outskirts of Lisbon), a monophthongization of the diphthong [ej] occurs. For example, "manêra" instead of "maneira" (manner), although this has evolved into [ɐj] in the Lisbon dialect ("manâira").
- The predorsodental sibilants, that is, /s/ and /z/, are pronounced as in the European pattern and are well distinguished from the lower x and the j, contrary to what happens with the northern dialects.
