= Oliventine Portuguese =

Subdialect of Alentejan Portuguese

- Português oliventino
- Native to: Portugal, Spain
- Region: Olivença, Táliga
- Language family: Indo-European: Italic; Latino-Faliscan; Latin; Romance; Italo-Western; Western Romance; Gallo-Iberian; Iberian Romance; West Iberian; Galician–Portuguese; Portuguese; Alentejan Portuguese; Oliventine Portuguese

Language codes
- ISO 639-3: –
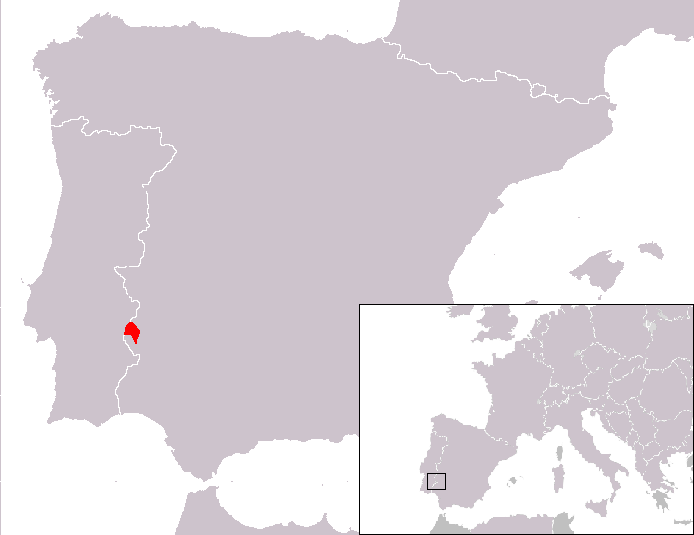

Oliventine Portuguese (also known as Portuguese from Olivença) is the dialectal variety of the Portuguese language natively spoken in the disputed municipalities of Olivença and Táliga, in Extremadura (Spain). Currently, the Portuguese of Olivença and Táliga is not recognized by Spain, which has administered this territory since the War of the Oranges in 1801. Portugal, however, does not recognize Spanish sovereignty over the region and claims it as its own.

As a result of two centuries of Spanish administration and isolation from Portugal, Oliventine Portuguese is now a dying language; only a few elderly people still use it and young people no longer speak it. The dialect is no longer spoken in Táliga.

Portuguese ceased to be the language of most of the population after the 1940s, a process accelerated by the Hispanicization policy implemented by Francoist Spain.

== Historical context ==
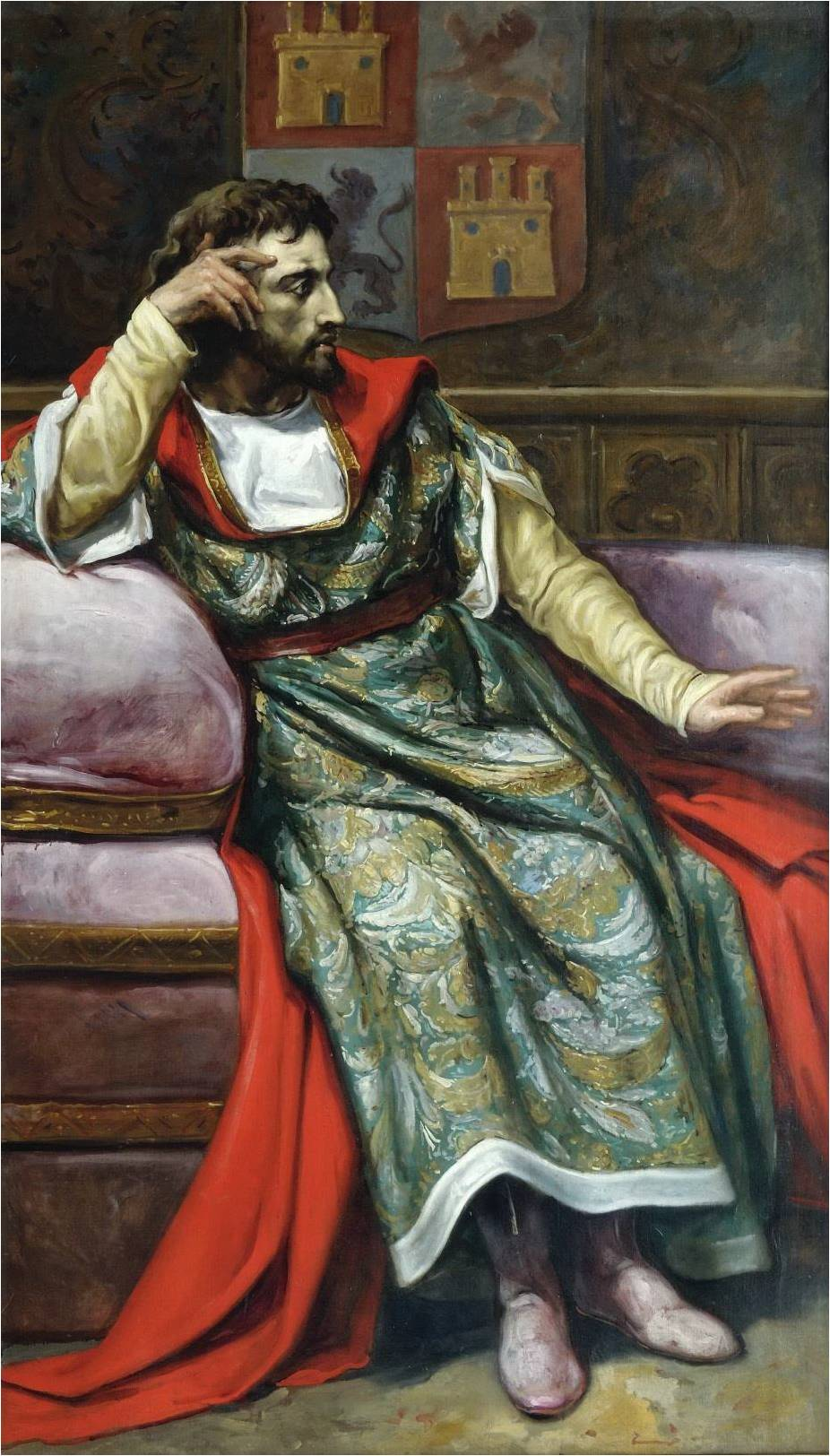
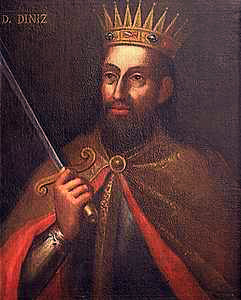
Ferdinand IV of Castile (left) and Dinis I of Portugal (right).

=== Olivença and Táliga in the Kingdom of León ===
The origin of Olivença is linked to the final conquest of Badajoz by the last king of León, Alfonso IX, in the spring of 1230. To thank the Templars for their participation in this conflict, Alfonso IX granted them the lands of Burguillos and Alconchel. From these locations, around 1256, the Order created the encomienda of Olivença, at that time only a set of vegetable gardens, huts, and some houses around a spring. However, during the reign of Alfonso X, the Templars had to leave Olivença and give their lands to the Council and Bishopric of Badajoz.

=== Olivença and Táliga in the Kingdom of Portugal ===
During the Reconquista, the lands that today form the territories of Olivença and Táliga were ceded to Portugal by the Treaty of Alcañices, in 1297, along with many other localities. King Denis had taken advantage of the weak Castilian political position to annex and retake several territories.

From 1297 until 1801, the towns remained under Portuguese sovereignty, even during the Iberian Union. Five centuries of Portuguese rule resulted in the flow of Portuguese culture and language to Olivença, as well as architectural expression and folklore.

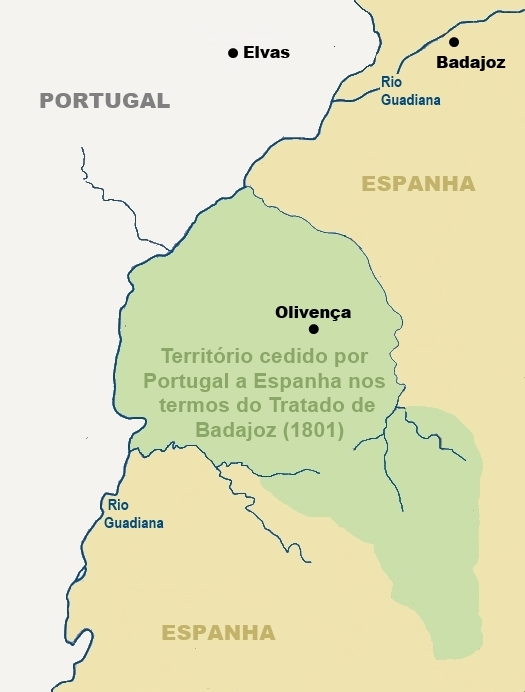
In green: territory ceded by Portugal to Spain in the terms of the Badajoz Treaty (1801)

Due to Olivença's peculiar geographical position, separated from the rest of the country by the Guadiana river and surrounded by Castilian settlements, it eventually developed a subdialect of Alentejan, with which it shares many of its isoglosses.

=== Olivença and Táliga in Spain ===
After the War of the Oranges, Portugal lost Olivença and Táliga. Although Portugal claims that Spain lost them at the Congress of Vienna, Spain continues to administer the territory. Portuguese remained the vehicular and mother tongue of the region's inhabitants until the middle of the 20th century, when it began to wane, a victim of the Hispanicization policies of Francoism and the educational system, since the latter did not teach Portuguese. Currently, the language is taught but only as a foreign language.

== Characteristics ==
Oliventine Portuguese is a subdialect of Alentejan Portuguese and therefore falls within the group of southern Portuguese dialects. The influence of Castilian is noticeable in some of the following points and the lexical field.

The most defining characteristics are:

- Preference for monophthong in "ô" (being "ou" in the standard, and in certain cases "oi"). Example: "ôro/oiro" (standard Portuguese: "ouro").
- Closure of the final tonic vowel "e" to "i". Example: "fomi" (standard Portuguese: "fome").
- Absence of the diphthong "ei", which becomes "ê". Example: "galinhêro" (standard Portuguese: "galinheiro"), with exceptions: "seis", "rei", "reino", etc.
- Yeísmo. Example: "casteyanos" (standard Portuguese: "castelhanos"). The pronunciation of the voiced palatal lateral approximant is maintained in São Bento da Contenda and in Vila Real but being on decline.
- Use of the voiceless velar affricate in a borrowing from Castilian, which is non-existent in both standard and dialectal Portuguese.
- Aspiration of the final "-s", influence of Extremadura dialectal Castilian. Even when not aspirated, the execution is very light.
- Occasional betacism, although also present in northern dialects. In Olivença it is of Castilian influence.
- The Oliventine Portuguese that is still spoken is full of Castilianisms, as seen in use of the Castilian words "coche" and "ancho" to the detriment of the Portuguese words "carro" and "largo". The Castilian spoken in the region is heavily influenced by the Portuguese and Extremaduran languages.

=== Morphological characteristics ===
==== Contraction with the preposition "por" ("by") ====
There are some Oliventine speakers who, by probable Castilian influence, keep the preposition "por" ("by") separate from the article, not contracting the preposition. In standard Portuguese and normative Galician, the norm is just the opposite; contraction is the rule. For example, por o/por a/por os/por as; standard Portuguese: pelo/pela/pelos/pelas, in normative Galician (Royal Galician Academy; RGA): polo/pola/polos/polas. In standard Portuguese there is also the form polo/pola/polos/polas but it is considered an archaism. It is possible to find some speakers in Campo Maior who use this archaic form.

==== Contraction of the pronoun/defined article with the prepositions "para" or "a" ("to") ====
Trait extended throughout the Galician-Portuguese linguistic area; in Olivença it is the general rule but there is also some conservation of the separation of the pronoun/defined article with the prepositions "para" or "a". For example, "ós" (standard: "aos") and "pà" (standard: "para"). In Portugal, in general, the contraction "pra" is often used and very rarely "pà", so it is possible to associate it with Castilianism, given the fact that the popular Castilian contraction is exactly the same.

==== Article contraction with the preposition "com" ("with") ====
This is a characteristic predominant in Portuguese informal speech, also present in Galicia where it is consecrated by the official orthography of the RGA; existing in Olivença. For example, "co/ca/cos/cas" (standard: "com o", "com a", "com os" and "as"); but also: "c'um/c'uma/c'uns/c'umas" (standard: "com um", "com uma", "com uns" and "umas").

==== Plurals of names ending in "ão" ====
There is evidence in Olivença of words ending in "ão" forming the plural "ões" in situations where standard Portuguese does not. For example, "capitões" and "cristões" (standard: "capitães" and "cristãos"). It is also a frequent error in some native Portuguese speakers to form such plurals.

==== Regular verbs form ====
Present	Simple past perfect	Simple imperfect past tense	Future	Conditional	Infinitive
Falo	Falê	Fala(b/v)a	Falarê	Falaria	Falári/Falá
Fala(h/s)	Falasti(h/s)	Fala(b/v)a(h/s)	Falará(h/s)	Falaria(h/s)	the same
Fala	Falô	Fala(b/v)a	Falará	Falaria	the same
Falêmo(h/s)	Falámo(h/s)	Falá(b/v)amos(h/s)	Falaremo(h/s)	Falaríamo(h/s)	the same
Falái(h/s)	Falasti(h/s)	Falá(b/v)ê(h/s)	Falarê(h/s)	Falarê(h/s)	the same
Falã	Falarõ	Falavã	Falarã	Falariã	the same

=== Verb "haver", "há" and "hai" ===
The verb "haver" ("to have") has the standard form "há", however, in Olivença and other Alentejan cities such as Alandroal or Elvas, there is also the form "hai", which is similar to the form used in standard Galician, "hai". Both variants are in frequent use in the Olivença region.

==== Verb "ir" ("to go"), "vas" ====
The variant "vais" from "vas" is widely adopted in Portuguese. The phenomenon is recorded in Olivença and Campo Maior. On the other hand, there are the forms "vaia" and "vaias" which are likely a case of Castilianism.

==== Verb "trazer" ("to bring"), "truxe" ====
This phenomenon of dialectal occurrence is present in part in Olivença. For example, "eu truxe" (standard: "eu trouxe").

==== Verb "dizer" ("to say"), "dezer" ====
In Olivença, it is common to use the verb "dizer" as "dezer". In unstressed forms it changes to "d'zia" or "d'zendo" (standard: "dizia" and "dizendo", respectively).

==== Contact between "não" ("no") and a verb ====
In Olivença, one finds the voiced elision of the adverb "não" ("no") and the verb that succeeds it, the latter needing to begin with a vowel. It is very noticeable with the verb "haver". For example, "n'havia" e "n'amo"; in standard Portuguese: "não havia" and "não amo".

=== Phonetic Characteristics ===
==== Palatalization ====
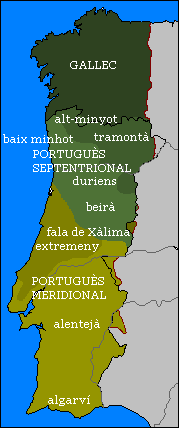
Dialects of the Galician-Portuguese linguistic domain. Olivença belongs to the Alentejan dialect.

In the plural of the first-person of the present tense, there is a peculiar phonetic feature, the palatalization of "a" for an "e". This trait is shared with settlements in the Alto Alentejo. For example, "andêmos por aí" as opposed to the standard Portuguese "andamos por aí". In some cases this phenomenon also occurs in the infinitive, e.g., "engordér" instead of "engordar".

There is another similar dialectal modification, the palatalization of "ã" for a "ẽ". For example, "amanhẽ" for "amanhã". This only happens in places on the east bank of Guadiana like Serpa and Olivença, but not in Vila Viçosa or Mértola.

In many parts of Alto Alentejo and very present Olivença is the closing of the vowel "e" when it is followed by a palatal. Examples are "lênha", "coêyo" and "ovêya"; which in standard Portuguese are "lenha", "coelho" and "ovelha", respectively.

==== Labialization of the closed vowel "ê" to "u" when followed by a labial consonant ====
This is a trait common to some isoglossic pockets of the Alto Alentejo, but it is not universal in Olivença, and there are isolated cases of it in Campo Maior. Examples of this are "buber" and "duvertido" (standard: "beber" and "divertido").

==== Nasalization before non-braking nasal consonants ====
This is a characteristic also shared with the dialects of Alto Alentejo. The phenomenon in Olivença is not widespread but is present. For example, "rãma", "sõnho" and "sõno"; in standard Portuguese: "rama", "sonho" and "sono", respectively.

==== Nasalization or change of timbre of the initial unstressed "a" ====
A fairly common feature in certain cases such as enté/anté (default: "até") and "ansim" (default: "assim"). This change is unique to Oliventine Portuguese and is not found in the other southern Portuguese dialects, including those closer to the Alto Alentejo.

==== Execution of the final vowel "e" as "i" ====
This is the most popularly known characteristic of Alentejan speech, widely used in the impersonation of the region's inhabitants. In Olivença it is difficult to differentiate between the execution of the final vowel as a closed "e" or as an "i", the clearest cases being, for example, "cidadis", "possibilidadi" and "naceri"; in standard Portuguese: "cidades", "possibilidade" and "nascer", respectively.

==== Assimilation of the tonic "e" when preceding an "i" ====
This feature is characterized by the replacement of the "e" by an "i". This is common to Elvas and to a lesser degree to Campo Maior. Examples are, "siguinte", "chiguê" and "piquena" (standard: "seguinte", "cheguei" and "pequena").

==== Opening of the vowels "i" and "ĩ" into "e" and "ẽ" respectively ====
This change is common in Olivença and is shared with many towns and villages of the Alto Alentejo. For example, "êrmandadi", "dêrêto" and "despôri" are in standard Portuguese: "irmandade", "direito" and "dispor".

==== Assimilation or dissimilation of the open or closed vowel "o" ====
Assimilation or dissimilation of the vowel "o" is not a universal feature in Olivença but autochthonous. For example, "teléfano" and "estâmago" (standard: "telefone" and "estômago").

==== Changes in the diphthong "eu" ====
In Olivença, as in other parts of the Alto Alentejo, monophthong into "ê" of the diphthong "eu" is common; however, there is also relative preservation of the diphthong. For example, "ê/eu", "Êropa/Europa", and "tê/teu". When the vowel "e" is open as in "ilhéu" the "é" resulting from the monophthong will also be open, e.g., "ilhé".

==== Monophthong from "ão" to "ã" ====
This is another common case in the Alto Alentejo and very common in Olivença, when in proclitic position, especially the adverb "não" ("no"). However, in other cases, the conservation of the semivocalic group is frequent. For example, "nã", "atã" and "mã" (standard: "não", "então" and "mão").

==== Monophthong from "ão" to "õ" ====
This is another common case in the Alto Alentejo and very common in Olivença, which occurs in the first syllable when in proclitic position, especially the adverb "não" ("no"). However, in other cases the conservation of the semi vocalic group is frequent. For example, "nã", "atã", and "mã" (standard: "não", "então", and "mão").

==== Monophthong from "-em" to "ẽ" ====
A general trait of Alentejan and Oliventine speech also observed in Campo Maior, including in young people. For example, "quẽ", "armazẽ" and "paragẽ"; in standard Portuguese: "quem", "armazém" and "paragem". The diphthong is preserved in an unproclitic or atonal position but the nasal "e" is closed.

==== Absence of the semivowel "i" when preceding a palatal consonant ====
These characteristics are particular not only to Olivença and the Alentejo speakers but also extended throughout the Center of the country. For example, "más", "caxa" and "faxa" (standard: "mais", "caixa" and 'faixa").

==== Atonal vowel syncope ====
A common case in the Alentejo region in general, in Olivença the pronunciation "pa" for the preposition "para" is most common. The execution of the unstressed vowels is quite light, making words like: "esse", "aquele" and "direita" into "ess", "aquel" and "drêta".

==== Metathesis between consonant and vibrant vowel ====
A trait also shared by other Alentejo villages, in Olivença, for example: "drento" e "preguntari" (standard: "dentro" and "perguntar").

== Linguistic situation ==
=== Portuguese domination ===
The Portuguese language, during the Portuguese domination of the territory, was the official language and, therefore, used in the administration. It was also allowed and promoted as the state language. Thus, the Portuguese of Olivença was regulated by the Lisbon Academy of Sciences, and the standard norm of the Portuguese language was used.

=== Orange Wars, 19th and first half of the 20th century ===
The official status would change in 1801, but for the Oliventine little had changed: Portuguese would continue to be used as before throughout the 19th century and until the 1940s. Portuguese was passed down from generation to generation, and the population, as same as before the Castilian conquest, continued to use Portuguese.

=== Francoism ===
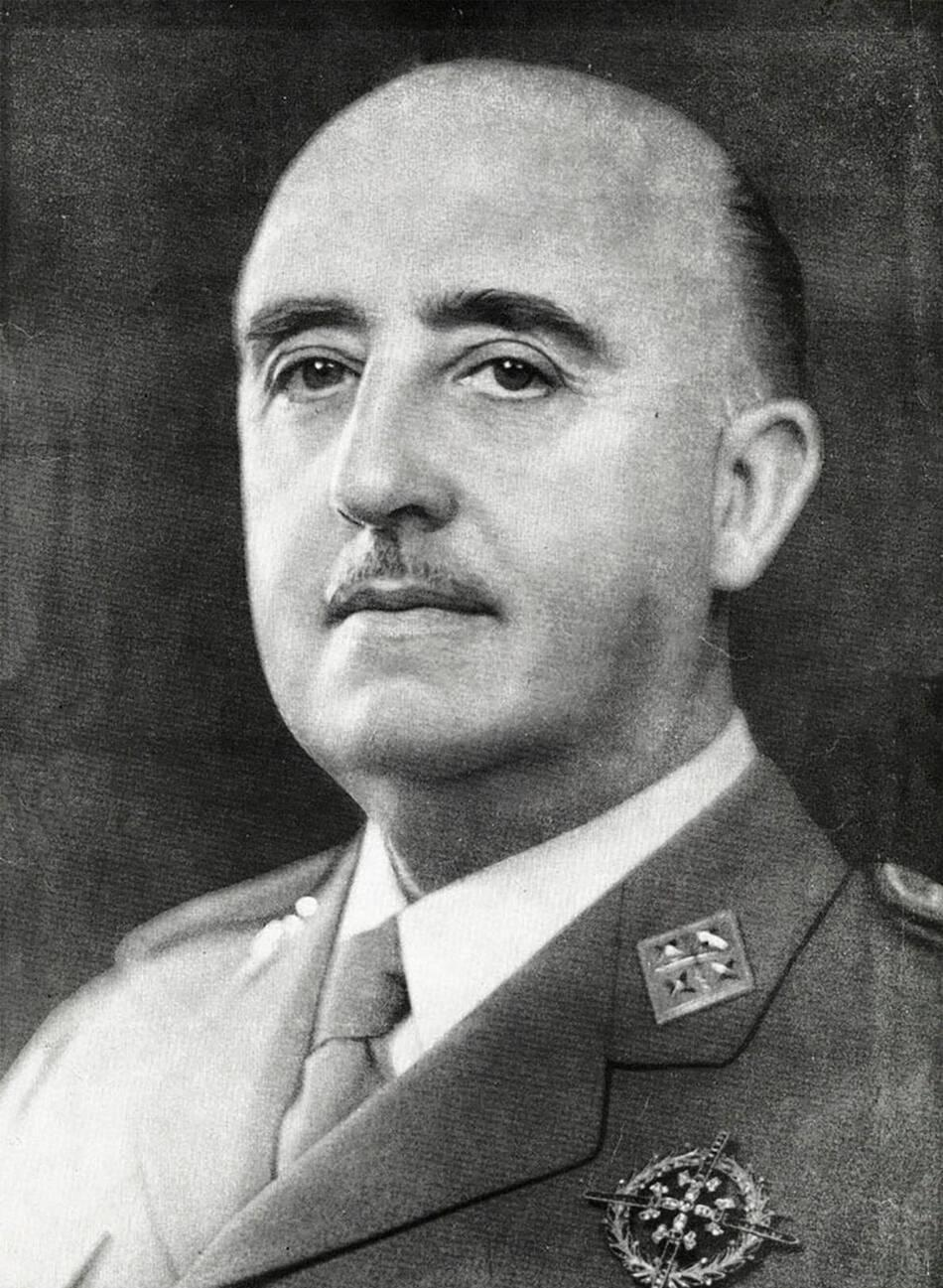
The Generalissimo Francisco Franco.

Throughout the 1940s and 1950s, with the implementation of Francoism and the policy of a monoglot Spain that persecuted all languages other than Castilian, the official state language, Portuguese, began to be frowned upon and lost prestige, becoming the language of the lower and uneducated classes. It was forbidden to speak Portuguese, Portuguese coats of arms were vandalized, and it was forbidden to pray to traditional Portuguese saints, such as Anthony of Padua.

Parents stopped speaking Portuguese to their children and spoke to them in Castilian instead. The educational system of that time played a decisive role: it made children literate in Castilian. Previously, young people didn't go to school, but went to work in the fields when they were approaching puberty, so that Portuguese culture was preserved; Franco brought systematic schooling, together with the arrival of mass media, broke the isolation and made the Lusitanian culture that had been well preserved until then disappear. The Francoist propaganda wanted to inculcate a spirit of distrust and distance in the Oliventine towards Portugal.

The new generations no longer knew the Portuguese language as their mother tongue, but as a foreign language alien to their land. The Sección Femenina was important in this process.

Popular festivals and folklore, signs of Portuguese culture, were persecuted or forgotten.

=== Modern day ===
Since the Transition (Transición) and the return to democracy, relations with Portugal have been restored and interest in Portuguese culture, in general, has increased. Portuguese architectural heritage is also being revalued, but a reluctant feeling towards Portugal and its culture still remains.

Portuguese is only spoken by the elderly, the coming generations being monoglot, having grown up and been educated in Castilian. The younger generation, therefore speaks Castilian in everyday life, both in formal and informal communication.

== Teaching ==
Portuguese is taught in Olivença and Táliga, but as a foreign language.

Some institutions such as the Instituto Camões used to fund projects to prevent the extinction of Portuguese in the region and promote Portuguese culture in Olivença, but such support no longer exists.

On Portugal Day, 2017, the first mass in Portuguese was celebrated since the 1840s when it was banned.

== Associations supporting the Oliventine Portuguese ==
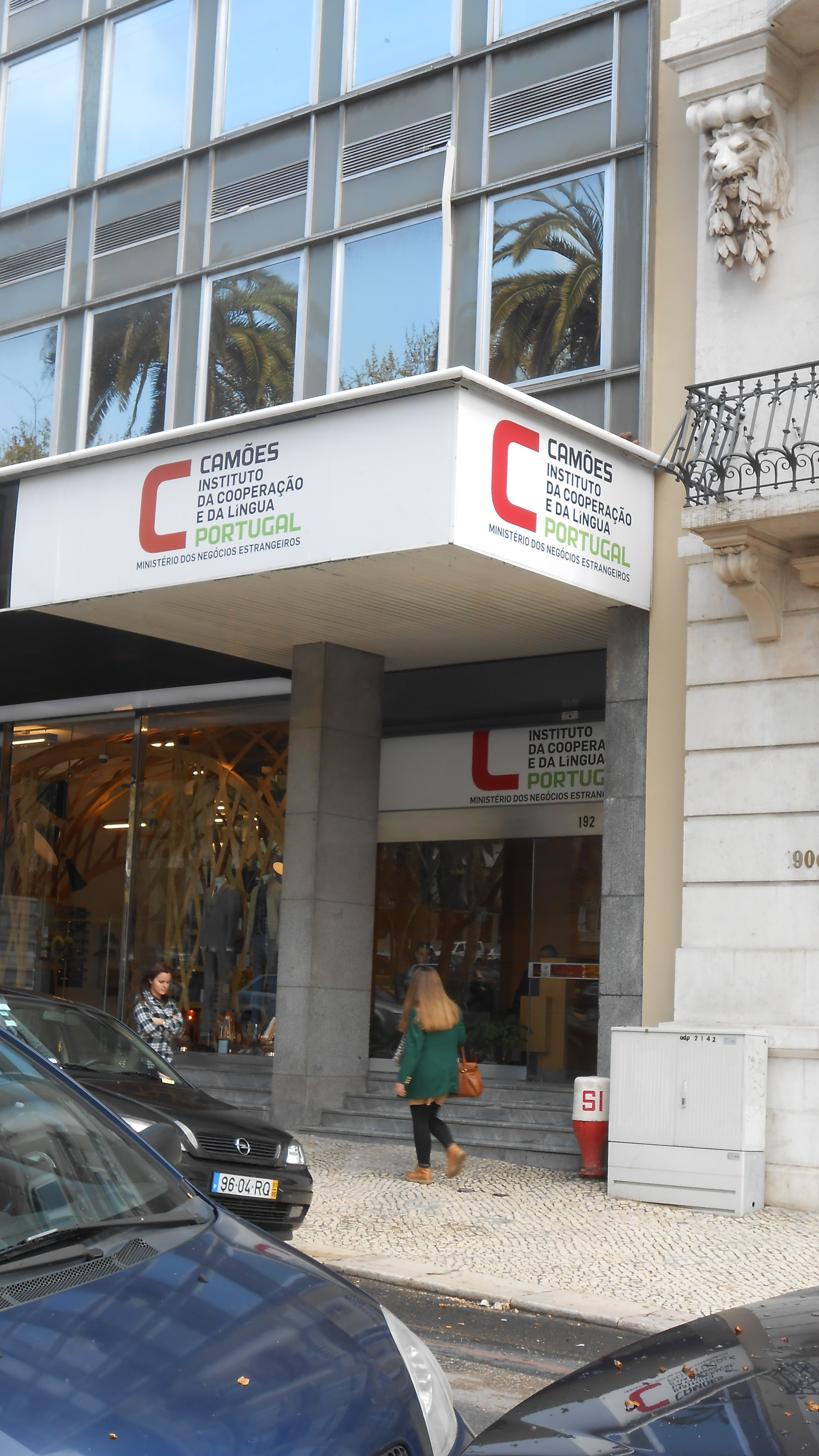
The Camões Institute headquarters, in Lisbon.

Several associations have worked in favor of the Portuguese language in Olivença and Táliga, and have done extensive documentary work and support projects for Portuguese speakers.

=== Instituto Camões ===
The Institute is an organ of the Portuguese government that aims to promote and preserve the Portuguese language throughout the world. It funded Portuguese courses and activities, but now no longer subsidizes these projects.

=== Além Guadiana ===
In 2008, the association Além Guadiana was born, which has organized several events, colloquia, and programs to help keep alive the language in Olivença and to compile all the oral heritage of the Oliventine people.

Além Guadiana's ambitious project is to create a sound database made of the recordings of the last Portuguese-speaking people of Olivença, this way, with the proverbs, stories, and songs, they document the recent history of the town.

=== Grupo dos Amigos de Olivença ===
The Grupo dos Amigos de Olivença is a Portuguese nationalist organization, created under the Estado Novo. Characterized by its irredentist attitude, it has put pressure on the Portuguese state about the teaching of the Portuguese language in Olivença.
