= Alentejan Portuguese =

Portuguese variety of Alentejo, Portugal

- Native to: Portugal, Spain
- Language family: Indo-European: Italic; Latino-Faliscan; Latin; Romance; Italo-Western; Western Romance; Gallo-Iberian; Iberian Romance; West Iberian; Galician–Portuguese; Portuguese; Alentejan Portuguese
- Dialects: Oliventine

Language codes
- ISO 639-3: –
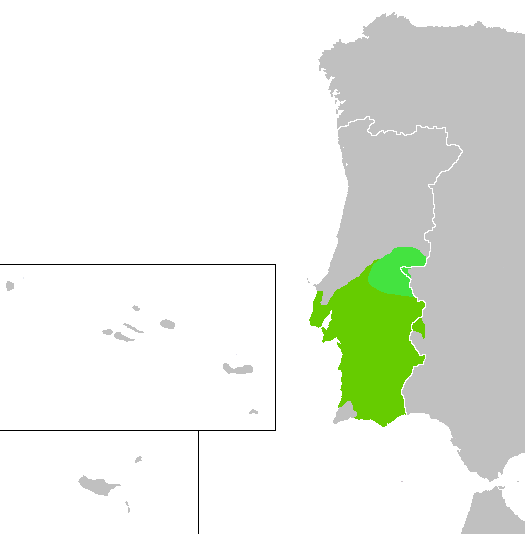
- Distribution of the Inland Central-Southern dialects, to which Alentejan and Baixo-Beirão-North Alto-Alentejan dialects belongs. Inland Central dialects: Baixo-Beirão - North Alto-Alentejan Portuguese, a different dialect Southern dialects, to which Alentejan Portuguese belongs (spoken in South and Central Alto-Alentejo, Baixo-Alentejo, Eastern Ribatejo and Olivenza/Olivença municipality

Alentejan Portuguese is a dialect of Portuguese spoken in most of the Portuguese region of Alentejo. It is also spoken, with its own subdialect, in the disputed municipalities of Olivença and Táliga. In this area, the language is currently endangered.

== Characteristics ==
Alentejan Portuguese is thought to be influenced by the regions large focus on agriculture and livestock. Vowels are after stretched as be more easily heard over long distances. This coupled with a slow more deliberate pronunciation makes speakers of Alentejan Portuguese sound a bit more relaxed and simple compared to other dialects Below are a few more traits that differentiate Alentejan Portuguese

- Presence of the article before the possessive pronoun, as in Ladino
- The regular use of the gerund in the present tense.
- A shift of ou to oi: oitro for outro
- Paragoge with i added to the end of verbs in the infinitive of verbs: fazeri for fazer
- The diphthong ei is replaced by e: galinhero for galinheiro

== Cultural Significance ==
The Cante Alentejano is a type of polyphonic singing derived from Alentejan Portuguese. The singing is characterized by its emphasis on vocal melodies and lack of accompanying instruments. In 2014, both Cante Alentejano and Fado music were listed by the UNESCO as Intangible Cultural Heritage of Humanity.

== Present situation in Olivença and Táliga ==
The 2005 report of the Council of Europe's expert group on the implementation of the European Charter for Regional or Minority Languages in Spain asked the Spanish government to furnish information about the situation of Oliventine Portuguese, and for measures for the protection and promotion of that language under the provisions of Article 7 of the charter. However, in the report submitted by Spain in 2006, there are no references to Oliventine Portuguese.

In the 2008 report issued by the Council of Europe, the following paragraphs were listed:

48. The Expert Committee has received no information on the use of Portuguese in Extremadura, particularly in Olivença.

49. According to information gathered during the site visit, the Portuguese language (the Oliventina) is traditionally spoken in Olivença and Táliga since the 13th century. However, the information received on the current use of this language is inconclusive, but indicates that Portuguese is taught as a foreign language in the education field.

50. The Expert Committee can not assess the situation of Portuguese in Extremadura, and urges the authorities to clarify this issue in the next cycle of monitoring, particularly in cooperation with the association "Além Guadiana", recently established to promote the Portuguese language.

== See also ==
- Algarvean Portuguese
- Oliventine Portuguese
