= Diphthong =

Combination of two adjacent vowel sounds

American English pronunciation of "no highway cowboys" /noʊ ˈhaɪweɪ ˈkaʊbɔɪz/, showing five diphthongs: /oʊ, aɪ, eɪ, aʊ, ɔɪ/

A diphthong (/ˈdɪfθɒŋ, ˈdɪp-/ DIF-thong, DIP-), also known as a gliding vowel or a vowel glide, is a combination of two adjacent vowel sounds within the same syllable. Technically, a diphthong is a vowel with two different targets: that is, the tongue (and/or other parts of the speech apparatus) moves during the pronunciation of the vowel. In most varieties of English, the phrase "no highway cowboys" (/noʊ ˈhaɪweɪ ˈkaʊbɔɪz/ noh HY-way KOW-boyz) has five distinct diphthongs, one in every syllable.

Diphthongs contrast with monophthongs, where the tongue or other speech organs do not move and the syllable contains only a single vowel sound. For instance, in English, the word ah is spoken as a monophthong (/ɑː/), while the word ow is spoken as a diphthong in most varieties (/aʊ/). Where two adjacent vowel sounds occur in different syllables (e.g. in the English word re-elect /ˌri.əˈlɛkt/) the result is described as hiatus, not as a diphthong.

Diphthongs often form when separate vowels are run together in rapid speech during a conversation. However, there are also unitary diphthongs, as in the English examples above, which are heard by listeners as single-vowel sounds (phonemes).

The word comes from Ancient Greek δίφθογγος (díphthongos) 'two sounds', from δίς (dís) 'twice' and φθόγγος (phthóngos) 'sound'.

== Transcription ==
In the International Phonetic Alphabet (IPA), monophthongs are transcribed with one symbol, as in English sun [sʌn], in which ⟨ʌ⟩ represents a monophthong. Diphthongs are transcribed with two symbols, as in English high /haɪ/ or cow /kaʊ/, in which ⟨aɪ⟩ and ⟨aʊ⟩ represent diphthongs.

Diphthongs may be transcribed with two vowel symbols or with a vowel symbol and a semivowel symbol. In the words above, the less prominent member of the diphthong can be represented with the symbols for the palatal approximant [j] and the labiovelar approximant [w], with the symbols for the close vowels [i] and [u], or the symbols for the near-close vowels [ɪ] and [ʊ]:

vowel and semivowel	⟨haj kaw⟩	broad transcription
two vowel symbols	⟨hai̯ kau̯⟩	broad transcription
two vowel symbols	⟨haɪ̯ kaʊ̯⟩	narrow transcription

Some transcriptions are broader or narrower (less precise or more precise phonetically) than others. Transcribing the English diphthongs in high and cow as ⟨aj aw⟩ or ⟨ai̯ au̯⟩ is a less precise or broader transcription, since these diphthongs usually end in a vowel sound that is more open than the semivowels [j w] or the close vowels [i u]. Transcribing the diphthongs as ⟨aɪ̯ aʊ̯⟩ is a somewhat more precise or narrower transcription, since the English diphthongs often end in the near-close vowels [ɪ ʊ], but there also exists wide dialectal variation; thus in some cases, they may be less precise, and simply used as a matter of historical convention or diaphonemic consistency.

The non-syllabic diacritic, the inverted breve below ⟨◌̯⟩, is placed under the less prominent part of a diphthong to show that it is part of a diphthong rather than a vowel in a separate syllable: [aɪ̯ aʊ̯]. When there is no contrastive vowel sequence in the language, the diacritic may be omitted. Other common indications that the two sounds are not separate vowels are a superscript, ⟨aᶦ aᶷ⟩, or a tie bar, ⟨a͡ɪ a͡ʊ⟩ or ⟨a͜ɪ a͜ʊ⟩. The tie bar can be useful when it is not clear which symbol represents the syllable nucleus, or when they have equal weight. Superscripts are especially used when an on- or off-glide is particularly fleeting.

The period ⟨.⟩ is the opposite of the non-syllabic diacritic: it represents a syllable break. If two vowels next to each other belong to two different syllables (hiatus), meaning that they do not form a diphthong, they can be transcribed with two vowel symbols with a period in between. Thus, lower can be transcribed ⟨ˈloʊ.ɚ⟩, with a period separating the first syllable, /loʊ/, from the second syllable, ⟨ɚ⟩.

The non-syllabic diacritic is used only when necessary. It is typically omitted when there is no ambiguity, as in ⟨haɪ kaʊ⟩. No words in English have the vowel sequences *[a.ɪ a.ʊ], so the non-syllabic diacritic is unnecessary.

== Types ==
=== Falling and rising ===
Falling (or descending) diphthongs start with a vowel quality of higher prominence (higher pitch or volume) and end in a semivowel with less prominence, like [aɪ̯] in eye, while rising (or ascending) diphthongs begin with a less prominent semivowel and end with a more prominent full vowel, similar to the [ja] in yard. (Sometimes, however, the terms "falling" and "rising" are used, instead, to refer to vowel height, i.e. as synonyms of the terms "closing" and "opening". See below.) The less prominent component in the diphthong may also be transcribed as an approximant, thus [aj] in eye and [ja] in yard. However, when the diphthong is analysed as a single phoneme, both elements are often transcribed with vowel symbols (/aɪ̯/, /ɪ̯a/). Semivowels and approximants are not equivalent in all treatments, and in the English and Italian languages, among others, many phoneticians do not consider rising combinations to be diphthongs, but rather sequences of approximant and vowel. There are many languages (such as Romanian) that contrast one or more rising diphthongs with similar sequences of a glide and a vowel in their phonetic inventory (see semivowel for examples).

=== Closing, opening, and centering ===
Vowel diagram illustrating closing diphthongs of Belgian Standard Dutch, from Verhoeven (2005:245)

Vowel diagram illustrating centering diphthongs of the Dutch dialect of Orsmaal-Gussenhoven, from Peters (2010:241)

In closing diphthongs, the second element is more close than the first (e.g. [ai]); in opening diphthongs, the second element is more open (e.g. [ia]). Closing diphthongs tend to be falling ([ai̯]), and opening diphthongs are generally rising ([i̯a]), as open vowels are more sonorous and therefore tend to be more prominent. However, exceptions to this rule are not rare in the world's languages. In Finnish, for instance, the opening diphthongs /ie̯/ and /uo̯/ are true falling diphthongs, since they begin louder and with higher pitch and fall in prominence during the diphthong.

A third, rare type of diphthong that is neither opening nor closing is height-harmonic diphthongs, with both elements at the same vowel height. These may have occurred in Old English:

- beorht [beo̯rxt] "bright"
- ċeald [t͡ʃæɑ̯ld] "cold"

A centering diphthong is one that begins with a more peripheral vowel and ends with a more central one, such as [ɪə̯], [ɛə̯], and [ʊə̯] in Received Pronunciation or [iə̯] and [uə̯] in Irish. Many centering diphthongs are also opening diphthongs ([iə̯], [uə̯]).

Diphthongs may contrast in how far they open or close. For example, Samoan contrasts low-to-mid with low-to-high diphthongs:

- 'ai [ʔai̯] 'probably'
- 'ae [ʔae̯] 'but'
- 'auro [ʔau̯ɾo] 'gold'
- ao [ao̯] 'a cloud'

=== Narrow and wide ===
Narrow diphthongs are the ones that end with a vowel which on a vowel chart is quite close to the one that begins the diphthong, for example Northern Dutch [eɪ], [øʏ] and [oʊ]. Wide diphthongs are the opposite – they require a greater tongue movement, and their offsets are farther away from their starting points on the vowel chart. Examples of wide diphthongs are RP/GA English [aɪ] and [aʊ].

=== Length ===
Languages differ in the length of diphthongs, measured in terms of morae. In languages with phonemically short and long vowels, diphthongs typically behave like long vowels, and are pronounced with a similar length. In languages with only one phonemic length for pure vowels, however, diphthongs may behave like pure vowels. For example, in Icelandic, both monophthongs and diphthongs are pronounced long before single consonants and short before most consonant clusters.

Some languages contrast short and long diphthongs. In some languages, such as Old English, these behave like short and long vowels, occupying one and two morae, respectively. Languages that contrast three quantities in diphthongs are extremely rare, but not unheard of; Northern Sami is known to contrast long, short and "finally stressed" diphthongs, the last of which are distinguished by a longer second element.

== Phonology ==
In some languages, diphthongs are single phonemes, while in others they are analyzed as sequences of two vowels, or of a vowel and a semivowel.

== Sound changes ==
Certain sound changes relate to diphthongs and monophthongs. Vowel breaking or diphthongization is a vowel shift in which a monophthong becomes a diphthong. Monophthongization or smoothing is a vowel shift in which a diphthong becomes a monophthong.

== Difference from semivowels and vowel sequences ==
While there are a number of similarities, diphthongs are not the same phonologically as a combination of a vowel and an approximant or glide. Most importantly, diphthongs are fully contained in the syllable nucleus while a semivowel or glide is restricted to the syllable boundaries (either the onset or the coda). This often manifests itself phonetically by a greater degree of constriction, but the phonetic distinction is not always clear. The English word yes, for example, consists of a palatal glide followed by a monophthong rather than a rising diphthong. In addition, the segmental elements must be different in diphthongs [ii̯] and so when it occurs in a language, it does not contrast with [iː]. However, it is possible for languages to contrast [ij] and [iː].

Diphthongs are also distinct from sequences of simple vowels. The Bunaq language of Timor, for example, distinguishes /sa͡i/ [saj] 'exit' from /sai/ [saʲi] 'be amused', /te͡i/ [tej] 'dance' from /tei/ [teʲi] 'stare at', and /po͡i/ [poj] 'choice' from /loi/ [loʷi] 'good'.

Some languages or dialects also articulate the component sounds of a diphthong differently than when those sounds are produced in hiatus. For example, due to English diphthong raising, many North American English speakers pronounce /aɪ/ with closer vowels than /a.ɪ/, and, among a subset of those, the diphthong /aʊ/ may be similarly raised as compared to /a.ʊ/.

== Examples ==
=== Indo-European languages ===
==== English ====
In words coming from Middle English, most cases of the Modern English diphthongs [aɪ̯, oʊ̯, eɪ̯, aʊ̯] originate from the Middle English long monophthongs [iː, ɔː, aː, uː] through the Great Vowel Shift, although some cases of [oʊ̯, eɪ̯] originate from the Middle English diphthongs [ɔu̯, aɪ̯].

Standard English diphthongs
	English diaphoneme	RP (British)	Australian	S.W. Irish	North American	
	English diaphoneme	RP (British)	Australian	S.W. Irish	GenAm	Canadian
low	⫽oʊ⫽	[əʉ̯]	[ɜʉ̯ ~ ɐʉ̯]	[oː]	[o̞ʊ̯ ~ ʌʊ̯ ~ ɔʊ̯ ~ o̞]	
loud	⫽aʊ⫽	[aʊ̯]	[æɔ̯]	[ɐʊ̯ ~ ʌʊ̯]	[aʊ̯ ~ æʊ̯] (Note: In Pittsburgh English, /aʊ̯/ is monophthongal [aː], leading to the stereotypical spelling "Dahntahn" for "downtown".)	[aʊ̯ ~ æʊ̯]
lout	⫽aʊ⫽	[aʊ̯]	[æɔ̯]	[ɐʊ̯ ~ ʌʊ̯]	[aʊ̯ ~ æʊ̯]	[ʌʊ̯] (Note: Canadian English and some dialects of northern American English exhibit allophony of /aʊ̯/ and /aɪ̯/ called Canadian raising – in some places they have become separate phonemes. GA has raising to a lesser extent in /aɪ̯/.)
lied	⫽aɪ⫽	[ɑ̈ɪ̯ ~ ʌ̞ɪ̯]	[ɑ̟e̯ ~ ɑe̯]	[æɪ̯ ~ ɐɪ̯]	[äɪ̯ ~ ɑɪ̯] (Note: In several American dialects such as Southern American English, /aɪ̯/ becomes monophthongal [aː] except before voiceless consonants.)	
light	⫽aɪ⫽	[ɑ̈ɪ̯ ~ ʌ̞ɪ̯]	[ɑ̟e̯ ~ ɑe̯]	[æɪ̯ ~ ɐɪ̯]	[ʌɪ̯ ~ ɜɪ̯ ~ ɐɪ̯]	
lay	⫽eɪ⫽	[e̞ɪ̯ ~ ɛɪ̯]	[æɪ̯ ~ ɐɪ̯]	[eː]	[eɪ̯ ~ e]	
loin	⫽ɔɪ⫽	[oɪ̯ ~ ɔ̝ɪ̯]	[oɪ̯]	[əɪ̯ ~ ɑɪ̯]	[ɔɪ̯ ~ oɪ̯]	
loon	⫽uː⫽ (Note: The erstwhile monophthongs /iː/ and /uː/ are diphthongized in many dialects. In many cases they might be better transcribed as [uu̯] and [ii̯], where the non-syllabic element is understood to be closer than the syllabic element. They are sometimes transcribed /uw/ and /ij/.)	[ʊ̈ʉ̯ ~ ʉː ~ ɨ̞ɯ̯̈]	[ʊ̈ʉ̯]	[uː]	[u̟ ~ ʊu̯ ~ ʉu̯ ~ ɵu̯]	[ʉu̯]
lean	⫽iː⫽	[ɪi̯ ~ iː]	[ɪi̯ ~ əi̯]	[iː]	[ɪi̯ ~ i]	
leer	⫽ɪər⫽	[ɪ̞ː ~ ëː ~ ɪə̯]	[ɪə̯ ~ ɪː ~ iː ~ iə̯]	[iːɹ]	[ɪɹ ~ iɹ]	
lair	⫽ɛər⫽	[ɛː ~ ɛə̯]	[e̞ː ~ eː]	[eːɹ]	[ɛɹ]	
lure	⫽ʊər⫽	[ɵː ~ ɤ̈ː, o̞ː]	[ʊ̈ʉ̯ə, oː]	[uːɹ]	[ʊɹ ~ ɔɹ ~ oɹ]	

==== Dutch ====
Diphthongs of Dutch
	Netherlandic	Belgian
zeis, ijs	[ɛɪ̯]	
ui	[œʏ̯]	
zout, louw	[ɑʊ̯]	[ɔʊ̯]
leeuw	[eːʊ̯]	
nieuw	[iʊ̯]	
duw	[yʊ̯]	
dooi	[o:ɪ̯]	
saai	[a:ɪ̯]	
loei	[uɪ̯]	
beet (Note: [eɪ̯], [øʏ̯], and [oʊ̯] are normally pronounced as closing diphthongs except when preceding [ɾ] and even [ɫ], in which case they are either centering diphthongs: [eə̯], [øə̯], and [oə̯] or are lengthened and monophthongized to [ɪː], [ʏː], and [ʊː])	[eɪ̯]	[eː]
neus	[øʏ̯]	[øː]
boot	[oʊ̯]	[oː]

The dialect of Hamont (in Limburg) has five centring diphthongs and contrasts long and short forms of [ɛɪ̯], [œʏ̯], [ɔʊ̯], and [ɑʊ̯].

==== Afrikaans ====
The Afrikaans language has its origin in Dutch but differs in many significant ways, including the use of diphthongs in the place of several non-diphthong Dutch double vowels, or double-vowels being pronounced differently. Examples include:

- ee as in leer
- eu as in deur
- ui as in buite

Diphthong phonemes
Starting point		Ending point		
Starting point		Front	Central	Back
Closed	unrounded			iʊ̯
Closed	rounded	uɪ̯		
Mid	unrounded	əɪ̯	ɪə	
Mid	rounded	œɪ̯, ɔɪ̯, oːɪ̯	ʏə, ʊə	œʊ̯
Open	unrounded	aɪ̯, ɑːɪ̯		

- Falling diphthongs. Their first element may be short [ɪə̯, ʊə̯] or somewhat lengthened [ɪˑə̯, ʊˑə̯].
- Rising diphthongs [ɪ̯ə, ʊ̯ə]. These variants do not seem to appear word-finally. The sequence /ɦʊə/ is commonly realised as [ɦʊ̯ə] or, more often, [ɦʊ̯ə̤], with /ɦ/ realised as breathy
- The scholar Daan Wissing argues that /əɪ̯/ is not a phonetically correct transcription and that /æɛ̯/ is more accurate. In his analysis, he found that [æɛ̯] makes for 65% of the realisations, the other 35% being monophthongal, [ə], [æ] and [ɛ].
- Most often, /œɪ̯/ has an unrounded offset. For some speakers, the onset is also unrounded. That can cause /œɪ̯/ to merge with /əɪ̯/, which is considered non-standard.
- /ɔɪ̯, aɪ̯/ occur mainly in loanwords.
- Older sources describe /œu/ as a narrow back diphthong [ou]. However, newer sources describe its onset as more front. For example, Lass (1984), states that the onset of /œu/ is central [ɵu].
  - In some words which, in English, are pronounced with /əʊ̯/, the Afrikaans equivalent tends to be pronounced with /œʊ̯/, rather than /ʊə/. That happens because Afrikaans /œʊ̯/ is more similar to the usual South African realization of English /əʊ̯/.

Example words for diphthongs
Phoneme	IPA	Orthography	Gloss
/ɪø/	/sɪøn/	seun	'son'
/əɪ̯/	/ɦəɪ̯/	hy	'he'
/ɪə/	/vɪət/	weet	'to know'
/œɪ̯/	/ɦœɪ̯s/	huis	'house'
/ɔɪ̯/	/ˈχɔɪ̯əŋ/	goiing	'burlap'
/ʊə/	/brʊət/	brood	'bread'
/œʊ̯/	/kœʊ̯t/	koud	'cold'
/aɪ̯/	/ˈbaɪ̯ə/	baie	'many'

The long diphthongs (or 'double vowels') are phonemically sequences of a free vowel and a non-syllabic equivalent of /i/ or /u/: [iu, ui, oːi, eu, ɑːi]. Both [iu] and [eu] tend to be pronounced as [iu], but they are spelled differently: the former as ⟨ieu⟩, the latter as ⟨eeu⟩.

In diminutives ending in /ki/ formed to monosyllabic nouns, the vowels /u, ɪə, ʊə, ɛ, ə, œ, ɔ, a, ɑː/ are realised as closing diphthongs [ui, ei, oi, ɛi, əi, œi, ɔi, ai, ɑːi]. In the same environment, the sequences /ɛn, ən, œn, ɔn, an/ are realized as [ɛiɲ, əiɲ, œiɲ, ɔiɲ, aiɲ], i.e. as closing diphthongs followed by palatal nasal.

- The suffixes ⟨-aad⟩ and ⟨-aat⟩ (phonemically /ɑːd/ and /ɑːt/, respectively) and the diminutive suffix /ki/ are realised as [ɑːki] (with a monophthong), rather than [ɑːiki].
- In practice, the diphthong [əi] is realised the same as the phonemic diphthong /əi/.
- [œi], when it has arisen from diphthongisation of [œ], differs from the phonemic diphthong /œi/ by having a slightly different onset, although the exact nature of that difference is unclear. This means that puntjie 'point' sounds somewhat different from puintjie 'rubble'.

==== German ====
===== Standard German =====
Phonemic diphthongs in German:

- /aɪ̯/ as in Ei 'egg'
- /aʊ̯/ as in Maus 'mouse'
- /ɔʏ̯/ as in neu 'new'

In the varieties of German that vocalize the /r/ in the syllable coda, other diphthongal combinations may occur. These are only phonetic diphthongs, not phonemic diphthongs, since the vocalic pronunciation [ɐ̯] alternates with consonantal pronunciations of /r/ if a vowel follows, cf. du hörst [duː ˈhøːɐ̯st] 'you hear' – ich höre [ʔɪç ˈhøːʀə] 'I hear'. These phonetic diphthongs may be as follows:

German diphthongs ending in [ɐ̯] (part 1), from Kohler (1999:88)

German diphthongs ending in [ɐ̯] (part 2), from Kohler (1999:88)

Diphthong		Example		
Phonemically	Phonetically	IPA	Orthography	Translation
/iːr/	[iːɐ̯]^{1}	[viːɐ̯]	wir	we
/yːr/	[yːɐ̯]^{1}	[fyːɐ̯]	für	for
/uːr/	[uːɐ̯]^{1}	[ˈʔuːɐ̯laʊ̯pʰ]	Urlaub	holiday
/ɪr/	[ɪɐ̯]	[vɪɐ̯tʰ]	wird	he/she/it becomes
/ʏr/	[ʏɐ̯]	[ˈvʏɐ̯də]	Würde	dignity
/ʊr/	[ʊɐ̯]	[ˈvʊɐ̯də]	wurde	I/he/she/it became
/eːr/	[eːɐ̯]^{1}	[meːɐ̯]	mehr	more
/øːr/	[øːɐ̯]^{1}	[høːɐ̯]	hör!	(you) hear!
/oːr/	[oːɐ̯]^{1}	[tʰoːɐ̯]	Tor	gate/goal (in football)
/ɛːr/	[ɛːɐ̯]^{1}	[bɛːɐ̯]	Bär	bear
/ɛr/	[ɛɐ̯]	[ʔɛɐ̯ftʰ]	Erft	Erft
/œr/	[œɐ̯]	[dœɐ̯tʰ]	dörrt	he/she/it dries
/ɔr/	[ɔɐ̯]	[ˈnɔɐ̯dn̩]	Norden	north
/aːr/	[aːɐ̯]^{1}	[vaːɐ̯]	wahr	true
/ar/	[aɐ̯]	[haɐ̯tʰ]	hart	hard

^1Wiese (1996) notes that the length contrast is not very stable before non-prevocalic /r/ and that "Meinhold & Stock (1980:180), following the pronouncing dictionaries (Mangold (1990), Krech & Stötzer (1982)) judge the vowel in Art, Schwert, Fahrt to be long, while the vowel in Ort, Furcht, hart is supposed to be short. The factual basis of this presumed distinction seems very questionable." He goes on stating that in his own dialect, there is no length difference in these words, and that judgements on vowel length in front of non-prevocalic /r/ which is itself vocalized are problematic, in particular if /a/ precedes.

According to the 'lengthless' analysis, the aforementioned 'long' diphthongs are analyzed as [iɐ̯], [yɐ̯], [uɐ̯], [eɐ̯], [øɐ̯], [oɐ̯], [ɛɐ̯] and [aɐ̯]. This makes non-prevocalic /aːr/ and /ar/ homophonous as [aɐ̯] or [aː]. Non-prevocalic /ɛːr/ and /ɛr/ may also merge, but the vowel chart in Kohler (1999:88) shows that they have somewhat different starting points.

Wiese (1996) also states that "laxing of the vowel is predicted to take place in shortened vowels; it does indeed seem to go hand in hand with the vowel shortening in many cases."

===== Bernese German =====
The diphthongs of some German dialects differ from standard German diphthongs. The Bernese German diphthongs, for instance, correspond rather to the Middle High German diphthongs than to standard German diphthongs:

- /iə̯/ as in lieb 'dear'
- /uə̯/ as in guet 'good'
- /yə̯/ as in müed 'tired'
- /ei̯/ as in Bei 'leg'
- /ou̯/ as in Boum 'tree'
- /øi̯/ as in Böim 'trees'

Apart from these phonemic diphthongs, Bernese German has numerous phonetic diphthongs due to L-vocalization in the syllable coda, for instance the following ones:

- [au̯] as in Stau 'stable'
- [aːu̯] as in Staau 'steel'
- [æu̯] as in Wäut 'world'
- [æːu̯] as in wääut 'elects'
- [ʊu̯] as in tschúud 'guilty'

==== Yiddish ====
Yiddish has three diphthongs:

- [ɛɪ̯] as in [plɛɪ̯tə] פּליטה ('refugee' f.)
- [aɛ̯] as in [naɛ̯n] נײַן ('nine')
- [ɔɜ̯] as in [ɔɜ̯fn̩] אופֿן ('way')

Diphthongs may reach a higher target position (towards /i/) in situations of coarticulatory phenomena or when words with such vowels are being emphasized.

==== Norwegian ====
There are five diphthongs in the Oslo dialect of Norwegian, all of them falling:

- [æɪ] as in nei, "no"
- [œʷʏʷ] as in øy, "island"
- [æʉ͍] as in sau, "sheep"
- [ɑɪ] as in hai, "shark"
- [ɔʷʏʷ] as in joik, "Sami song"

An additional diphthong, [ʉ͍ɪ], occurs only in the word hui in the expression i hui og hast "in great haste". The number and form of diphthongs vary between dialects.

==== Faroese ====
Diphthongs in Faroese are:

- /ai/ as in bein (can also be short)
- /au/ as in havn
- /ɛa/ as in har, mær
- /ɛi/ as in hey
- /ɛu/ as in nevnd
- /œu/ as in nøvn
- /ʉu/ as in hús
- /ʊi/ as in mín, bý, ið (can also be short)
- /ɔa/ as in ráð
- /ɔi/ as in hoyra (can also be short)
- /ɔu/ as in sól, ovn

==== Icelandic ====
Diphthongs in Icelandic are the following:

- /au̯/ as in átta, "eight"
- /ou̯/ as in nóg, "enough"
- /øi̯/ as in auga, "eye"
- /ai̯/ as in kær, "dear"
- /ei̯/ as in þeir, "they"
- /ɔi/ as in koja, "bunk bed", "berth" (rare, only in handful of words)

Combinations of semivowel /j/ and a vowel are the following:

- /jɛ/ as in éta, "eat"
- /ja/ as in jata, "manger"
- /jau̯/ as in já, "yes"
- /jo/ as in joð, "iodine", "jay", "yod" (only in a handful of words of foreign origin)
- /jou̯/ as in jól, "Christmas"
- /jœ/ as in jötunn, "giant"
- /jai̯/ as in jæja, "oh well"
- /ju/ as in jú, "yes"

==== French ====
In French, /wa/, /wɛ̃/, /ɥi/ and /ɥɛ̃/ may be considered true diphthongs (that is, fully contained in the syllable nucleus: [u̯a], [u̯ɛ̃], [y̯i], [y̯ɛ̃]). Other sequences are considered part of a glide formation process that turns a high vowel into a semivowel (and part of the syllable onset) when followed by another vowel.

Diphthongs

- /wa/ [u̯a] as in roi "king", coi "quiet", croix "cross", doigt "finger", droit "right", foi "faith", loi "law", proie "prey", soie "silk", toit "roof", voie "way", voix "voice"
- /wɛ̃/ [u̯ɛ̃] as in groin "muzzle", coin "corner", coing "quince", foin "hay", moins "less", loin "far", point "point", poing "fist", soin "care"
- /ɥi/ [y̯i] as in huit "eight", bruit "noise", buis "boxwood", fruit "fruit", fuite "leak", luire "glow", nuire "harm", nuit "night", pluie "rain", suite "continuation"
- /ɥɛ̃/ [y̯ɛ̃] as in juin "June", suint "ooze (tar)"

Semivowels

- /wi/ as in oui "yes"
- /jɛ̃/ as in lien "bond"
- /jɛ/ as in Ariège
- /je/ as in pied "foot"
- /ji/ as in yin
- /aj/ as in travail "work"
- /ɛj/ as in Marseille
- /ij/ as in bille "ball"
- /œj/ as in feuille "leaf"
- /uj/ as in grenouille "frog"
- /jø/ as in vieux "old"

===== Quebec French =====
In Quebec French, long vowels are generally diphthongized in informal speech when stressed.

- [ɑɔ̯] as in tard "late"
- [aɛ̯] as in père "father"
- [aœ̯] as in fleur "flower"
- [ou̯] as in autre "other"
- [øy̯] as in neutre "neutral"
- [ãʊ̯̃] as in banque "bank"
- [ẽɪ̯̃] as in mince "thin"
- [ɒ̃ʊ̯̃] as in bon "well"
- [œ̃ʏ̯̃] as in un "one"

==== Catalan ====
Catalan possesses a number of phonetic diphthongs, all of which begin ("rising diphthongs") or end ("falling diphthongs") in /i/ [j] or /u/ [w].

Falling diphthongs
IPA	word	gloss	IPA	word	gloss
[aj]	aigua	'water'	[aw] ([ɑw])	taula	'table'
[əj] (E) / [aj] (W) ([ɐj])	mainada	'children'	[əw] (E) / [aw] (W) ([ɐw])	caurem	'we will fall'
[ɛj]	oleic	'oleic'	[ɛw]	peu	'foot'
[ej]	rei	'king'	[ew]	seu	'his/her'
[əj] (E) / [ej] (W)	Eivissa	'Ibiza'	[əw] (E) / [ew] (W)	eufemisme	'euphemism'
[ij] (Note: The diphthong [ij] is mainly found in Balearic.) (B) ([iː])	novii	'bridegroom'	[iw]	niu	'nest'
[ɔj]	heroi	'hero'	[ɔw] (Note: [ɔw] ([ɒw]) may merge with [aw] ([ɑw]) in Southern Valencian.)	nou	'new'
			[ow] (Note: Unstressed [ow] may merge with [əw] in Eastern dialects.)	sou	'you are'
[uj] (E) / [oj] (W)	Moisès / Moisés	'Moses'	[ow]	mouré	'I will move'
[uj] (Note: Merges with [wi] in some dialects.)	cuit	'cooked'	[uw] ([uː])	duu	'he/she carries'
Rising diphthongs
IPA	word	gloss	IPA	word	gloss
[ja]	iaio	'grandpa'	[wa]	guant	'glove'
[jə] (E) / [ja] (W) ([jɐ])	feia	'he/she was doing'	[wə] (E) / [wa] (W) ([wɐ])	aquareŀla	'watercolour'
[jɛ]	Aielo	'Aielo'	[wɛ]	seqüència	'sequence'
[je]	seient	'seat'	[we]	ungüent	'ointment'
[jə] (E) / [je] (W)	laietans	'Laietani'	[wə] (E) / [we] (W)	qüestió	'question'
			[wi]	pingüí	'penguin'
[jɔ]	iode	'iodine'	[wɔ]	quòrum	'quorum'
[jo]	raió	'rayon'	[wo]	seuós	'greasy'
[ju] (E) / [jo] (W)	iogurt	'yoghurt'	[wu] (E) / [wo] (W)	quotidià	'daily', 'quotidian'
[ju]	iugoslau	'Yugoslav'			

Notes

In Standard Eastern Catalan, rising diphthongs (that is, those starting with [j] or [w]) are possible only in the following contexts:

- [j] in word initial position, e.g. iogurt.
- Both occur between vowels as in feia and veiem.
- In the sequences [ɡw] or [kw] and vowel, e.g. guant, quota, qüestió, pingüí (these exceptional cases even lead some scholars to hypothesize the existence of rare labiovelar phonemes /ɡʷ/ and /kʷ/).

There are also certain instances of compensatory diphthongization in the Mallorcan dialect so that /ˈtroncs/ ('logs') (in addition to deleting the palatal plosive) develops a compensating palatal glide and surfaces as [ˈtrojns] (and contrasts with the unpluralized [ˈtronʲc]). Diphthongization compensates for the loss of the palatal stop (part of Catalan's segment loss compensation). There are other cases where diphthongization compensates for the loss of point of articulation features (property loss compensation) as in [ˈaɲ] ('year') vs [ˈajns] ('years'). The dialectal distribution of this compensatory diphthongization is almost entirely dependent on the dorsal plosive (whether it is velar or palatal) and the extent of consonant assimilation (whether or not it is extended to palatals).

==== Portuguese ====
The Portuguese diphthongs are formed by the labio-velar approximant [w] and palatal approximant [j] with a vowel, European Portuguese has 14 phonemic diphthongs (10 oral and 4 nasal), all of which are falling diphthongs formed by a vowel and a nonsyllabic high vowel. Brazilian Portuguese has roughly the same amount, although the European and non-European dialects have slightly different pronunciations ([ɐj] is a distinctive feature of some southern and central Portuguese dialects, especially that of Lisbon). A [w] onglide after /k/ or /ɡ/ and before all vowels as in quando [ˈkwɐ̃du] ('when') or guarda [ˈɡwaɾðɐ ~ ˈɡwaʁdɐ] ('guard') may also form rising diphthongs and triphthongs. Additionally, in casual speech, adjacent heterosyllabic vowels may combine into diphthongs and triphthongs or even sequences of them.

Falling diphthongs of Portuguese
oral
	EP	BP		EP	BP
sai	[aj]		mau	[aw]	
sei	[ɐj]/[ej]	[ej]	meu	[ew]	
anéis	[ɛj]		véu	[ɛw]	
			viu	[iw]	
mói	[ɔj]				
moita	[oj]		dou	[ow]	
fui	[uj]				
nasal
mãe	[ɐ̃j]	[ɐ̃j]	mão	[ɐ̃w]	
cem	[ɐ̃j]	[ẽj]			
anões	[õj]				
muita	[ũj]				

In addition, phonetic diphthongs are formed in most Brazilian Portuguese dialects by the vocalization of /l/ in the syllable coda with words like sol [sɔw] ('sun') and sul [suw] ('south') as well as by yodization of vowels preceding /s/ or its allophone at syllable coda [ʃ ~ ɕ] in terms like arroz [aˈʁojs ~ ɐˈʁo(j)ɕ] ('rice'), and /z/ (or [ʒ ~ ʑ]) in terms such as paz mundial [ˈpajz mũdʒiˈaw ~ ˈpa(j)ʑ mũdʑiˈaw] ('world peace') and dez anos [ˌdɛjˈz‿ɐ̃nu(j)s ~ ˌdɛjˈz‿ɐ̃nuɕ] ('ten years').

==== Spanish ====
Phonetically, Spanish has seven falling diphthongs and eight rising diphthongs. In addition, during fast speech, sequences of vowels in hiatus become diphthongs wherein one becomes non-syllabic (unless they are the same vowel, in which case they fuse together) as in poeta [ˈpo̯eta] ('poet'), almohada [alˈmo̯aða] ('pillow'), maestro [ˈmae̯stɾo] ('teacher') and línea [ˈline̯a] ('line'). The Spanish diphthongs are:

Spanish diphthongs
falling
[ai̯]	aire	'air'	[au̯]	pausa	'pause'
[ei̯]	rey	'king'	[eu̯]	neutro	'neutral'
[oi̯]	hoy	'today'	[ou̯]	bou	'seine fishing'
[ui̯]	muy	'very'			
rising
[ja]	hacia	'towards'	[wa]	cuadro	'picture'
[je]	tierra	'earth'	[we]	fuego	'fire'
			[wi]	fuimos	'we went'
[jo]	radio	'radio'	[wo]	cuota	'quota'
[ju]	viuda	'widow'			

==== Italian ====
The existence of true diphthongs in Italian is debated; however, a list is:

Italian diphthongs
falling
[ai̯]	baita	'mountain hut'	[au̯]	auto	'car'
[ei̯]	potei	'I could' (past tense)	[eu̯]	pleurite	'pleurisy'
[ɛi̯]	sei	'six'	[ɛu̯]	neutro	'neuter'
[ɔi̯]	poi	'later'			
[oi̯]	voi	'you' (pl.)			
[ui̯]	lui	'he'			
rising
[ja]	chiave	'key'	[wa]	guado	'ford'
[jɛ]	pieno	'full'	[wɛ]	quercia	'oak'
[je]	soffietto	'bellows'	[we]	quello	'that'
			[wi]	guida	'guide'
[jɔ]	chiodo	'nail'	[wɔ]	quota	'quota'
[jo]	fiore	'flower'	[wo]	acquoso	'watery'
[ju]	piuma	'feather'			

The second table includes only 'false' diphthongs, composed of a semivowel + a vowel, not two vowels. The situation is more nuanced in the first table: a word such as 'baita' is actually pronounced ['baj.ta] and most speakers would syllabify it that way. A word such as 'voi' would instead be pronounced and syllabified as ['vo.i], yet again without a diphthong.

In general, unstressed /i e o u/ in hiatus can turn into glides in more rapid speech (e.g. biennale [bi̯enˈnaːle] 'biennial'; coalizione [ko̯alitˈtsi̯oːne] 'coalition') with the process occurring more readily in syllables further from stress.

==== Romanian ====
Romanian has two true diphthongs: /e̯a/ and /o̯a/. There are, however, a host of other vowel combinations (more than any other major Romance language) which are classified as vowel glides. As a result of their origin (diphthongization of mid vowels under stress), the two true diphthongs appear only in stressed syllables and make morphological alternations with the mid vowels /e/ and /o/. To native speakers, they sound very similar to /ja/ and /wa/ respectively. There are no perfect minimal pairs to contrast /o̯a/ and /wa/, and because /o̯a/ does not appear in the final syllable of a prosodic word, there are no monosyllabic words with /o̯a/; exceptions might include voal ('veil') and trotuar ('sidewalk'), though Ioana Chițoran argues that these are best treated as containing glide-vowel sequences rather than diphthongs. In addition to these, the semivowels /j/ and /w/ can be combined (either before, after, or both) with most vowels, while this arguably forms additional diphthongs and triphthongs, only /e̯a/ and /o̯a/ can follow an obstruent-liquid cluster such as in broască ('frog') and dreagă ('to mend'), implying that /j/ and /w/ are restricted to the syllable boundary and therefore, strictly speaking, do not form diphthongs.

==== Irish ====
All Irish diphthongs are falling.

- [əi̯], spelled aigh, aidh, agh, adh, eagh, eadh, eigh, or eidh
- [əu̯], spelled abh, amh, eabh, or eamh
- [iə̯], spelled ia, iai
- [uə̯], spelled ua, uai

==== Scottish Gaelic ====
There are 9 diphthongs in Scottish Gaelic. Group 1 occur anywhere (eu is usually [eː] before -m, e.g. Seumas). Group 2 are reflexes that occur before -ll, -m, -nn, -bh, -dh, -gh and -mh.

		Spellings	Examples
1	[iə]	ia	iarr "ask"
1	[uə]	ua	fuar "cold"
1	[ia]	eu	beul "mouth"
2	[ai]	ai	saill "grease", cainnt "speech", aimhreit "riot"
2	[ei]	ei	seinn "sing"
2	[ɤi]	oi, ei, ai	loinn "badge", greim "bite", saighdear "soldier"
2	[ɯi]	ui, aoi	druim "back", aoibhneas "joy"
2	[au]	a, ea	cam "crooked", ceann "head"
2	[ɔu]	o	tom "mound", donn "brown"

For more detailed explanations of Gaelic diphthongs see Scottish Gaelic orthography.

==== Cornish ====
The following diphthongs are used in the Standard Written Form of Cornish. Each diphthong is given with its Revived Middle Cornish (RMC) and Revived Late Cornish (RLC) pronunciation.

Graph	RMC	RLC	Example
aw	[aʊ]	[æʊ]	glaw "rain"
ay	[aɪ]	[əɪ]	bay "kiss"
ew	[ɛʊ]		blew "hair"
ey	[ɛɪ]	[əɪ]	bleydh "wolf"
iw	[iʊ]	[ɪʊ]	liw "colour"
ow	[ɔʊ]		lowen "happy"
oy	[ɔɪ]		moy "more"
uw	[yʊ]	[ɪʊ]	duw "god"
yw	[ɪʊ]	[ɛʊ]	byw "alive"

==== Welsh ====
Welsh is traditionally divided into Northern and Southern dialects. In the north, some diphthongs may be short or long according to regular vowel length rules but in the south they are always short (see Welsh phonology). Southern dialects tend to simplify diphthongs in speech (e.g. gwaith /ɡwaiθ/ is reduced to /ɡwaːθ/).

Grapheme	North	South	Example
ae	/ɑːɨ/	/ai/	maen 'stone'
ai	/ai/	/ai/	gwaith 'work'
au†	/aɨ/	/ai/	haul 'sun'
aw	/au, ɑːu/	/au/	mawr 'big'
ei	/əi/	/əi/	gweithio 'to work'
eu	/əɨ/	/əi/	treulio 'spend'
ey	/əɨ/	/əi/	teyrn 'tyrant'
ew	/ɛu, eːu/	/ɛu/	tew 'fat'
oe	/ɔɨ, ɔːɨ/	/ɔi/	moel 'bald'
ou	/ɔɨ, ɔːɨ/	/ɔi/	cyffrous 'excited'
oi	/ɔi/	/ɔi/	troi 'turn'
ow	/ɔu, oːu/	/ɔu/	brown 'brown'
wy	/ʊɨ, uːɨ/	/ʊi/	pwyll 'sense'
iw	/ɪu/	/ɪu/	lliw 'colour'
uw	/ɨu/	/ɪu/	duw 'god'
yw	/ɨu/	/ɪu/	llyw 'rudder'
yw	/əu/	/əu/	tywydd 'weather'

† The plural ending -au is reduced to /a/ in the north and /e/ in the south, e.g. cadau 'battles' is /ˈkada/ (north) or /ˈkade/ (south).

==== Czech ====
There are three diphthongs in Czech:

- /aʊ̯/ as in auto (almost exclusively in words of foreign origin)
- /eʊ̯/ as in euro (in words of foreign origin only)
- /oʊ̯/ as in koule

The vowel groups ia, ie, ii, io, and iu in foreign words are not regarded as diphthongs, they are pronounced with /j/ between the vowels [ɪja, ɪjɛ, ɪjɪ, ɪjo, ɪju].

==== Serbo-Croatian ====
- i(j)e, as in mlijeko (in Ijekavian varieties)

may be pronounced as a diphthong, but also as [ie] in hiatus or separated by a semivowel, [ije]. For example, in the first line of the national anthem of Croatia, Lijepa naša domovina, ije is pronounced as a diphthong, but in the first line of the national anthem of Montenegro, Oj, svijetla majska zoro, ije is pronounced as two syllables.

Some Serbo-Croatian dialects also have uo, as in kuonj, ruod, uon whereas, in Standard Croatian and Serbian, these words are konj, rod, on.

=== Uralic languages ===
==== Estonian ====
All nine vowels can appear as the first component of an Estonian diphthong, but only [ɑ e i o u] occur as the second component.

Common Estonian diphthongs
		[ɑe]	aed "fence, garden"	[ɑi]	lai "wide"	[ɑo]	kaotama "to lose"	[ɑu]	laud "table"
[eɑ]	teadma "to know"			[ei]	leib "bread"	[eo]	teostus "accomplishment"	[iu]	kiuste "in spite of"
[oɑ]	toa "room" (s. possessive)	[oe]	koer "dog"	[oi]	toit "food"				
				[ui]	kui "when, if"				
[ɤɑ]	lõa "tether" (s. possessive)	[ɤe]	nõel "needle"	[ɤi]	õige "right, correct"	[ɤo]	tõotus "promise"	[ɤu]	lõug "chin"
		[æe]	päev "day"	[æi]	täis "full"	[æo]	näo "face" (s. possessive)	[æu]	näuguma "to meow"
		[øe]	söed "coals"	[øi]	köis "rope"				

There are additional diphthongs less commonly used, such as [eu] in Euroopa (Europe), [øɑ] in söandama (to dare), and [æu] in näuguma (to mew).

==== Finnish ====
All Finnish diphthongs are falling. Notably, Finnish has true opening diphthongs (e.g. /uo/), which are not very common crosslinguistically compared to centering diphthongs (e.g. /uə/ in English). Vowel combinations across syllables may in practice be pronounced as diphthongs, when an intervening consonant has elided, as in näön [næøn] instead of [næ.øn] for the genitive of näkö ('sight').

closing

- [ɑi̯] as in laiva (ship)
- [ei̯] as in keinu (swing)
- [oi̯] as in poika (boy)
- [æi̯] as in äiti (mother)
- [øi̯] as in öisin (at nights)
- [ɑu̯] as in lauha (mild)
- [eu̯] as in leuto (mild)
- [ou̯] as in koulu (school)
- [ey̯] as in leyhyä (to waft)
- [æy̯] as in täysi (full)
- [øy̯] as in löytää (to find)

close

- [ui̯] as in uida (to swim)
- [yi̯] as in lyijy (lead)
- [iu̯] as in viulu (violin)
- [iy̯] as in siistiytyä (to smarten up)

opening

- [ie̯] as in kieli (tongue)
- [uo̯] as in suo (bog)
- [yø̯] as in yö (night)

==== Northern Sami ====
The diphthong system in Northern Sami varies considerably from one dialect to another. The Western Finnmark dialects distinguish four different qualities of opening diphthongs:

- /eæ/ as in leat "to be"
- /ie/ as in giella "language"
- /oa/ as in boahtit "to come"
- /uo/ as in vuodjat "to swim"

In terms of quantity, Northern Sami shows a three-way contrast between long, short and finally stressed diphthongs. The last are distinguished from long and short diphthongs by a markedly long and stressed second component. Diphthong quantity is not indicated in spelling.

=== Semitic languages ===
==== Maltese ====
Maltese has seven falling diphthongs, though they may be considered VC sequences phonemically.

- [ɛɪ̯] ej or għi
- [ɐɪ̯] aj or għi
- [ɔɪ̯] oj
- [ɪʊ̯] iw
- [ɛʊ̯] ew
- [ɐʊ̯] aw or għu
- [ɔʊ̯] ow or għu

=== Sino-Tibetan languages ===
==== Mandarin Chinese ====
Rising sequences in Mandarin are usually regarded as a combination of a medial semivowel ([j], [w], or [ɥ]) plus a vowel, while falling sequences are regarded as one diphthong.

- ai: [ai̯], as in 愛 ài ('love')
- ao: [au̯], as in 道 dào ('way')
- ei: [ei̯], as in 累 lèi ('tired')
- ou: [ou̯], as in 豆 dòu ('bean')

==== Cantonese ====
Cantonese has eleven falling diphthongs.

- aai: [aːi̯], as in 街 gaai1 ('street')
- aau: [aːu̯], as in 爆 baau3 ('explode')
- ai: [ɐi̯], as in 雞 gai1 ('chicken')
- au: [ɐu̯], as in 勾 ngau1 ('hook')
- ei: [ei̯], as in 機 gei1 ('machine')
- eu: [ɛːu̯], as in 掉 deu6 ('throw')
- eui: [ɵy̯], as in 醉 zeoi3 ('drunk')
- iu: [iːu̯], as in 叫 giu3 ('call')
- oi: [ɔːy̯], as in 愛 oi3 ('love')
- ou: [ou̯], as in 高 gou1 ('high')
- ui: [uːy̯], as in 陪 pui4 ('accompany')

=== Tai–Kadai languages ===
==== Thai ====
In addition to vowel nuclei following or preceding /j/ and /w/, Thai has three diphthongs:

- [ia̯] เ–ีย ia
- [ɯa̯] เ–ือ uea
- [ua̯] –ัว ua

=== Mon-Khmer languages ===
==== Vietnamese ====
In addition to vowel nuclei following or preceding /j/ and /w/, Vietnamese has three diphthongs:

- [iə̯] ia ~ iê
- [ɨə̯] ưa ~ ươ
- [uə̯] ua ~ uô

==== Khmer ====
Khmer language has rich vocalics with an extra distinction of long and short register to the vowels and diphthongs.

- [iə̯]
- [ei̯]
- [ɐe̯]
- [ɨə̯]
- [əɨ̯]
- [ɐə̯]
- [ao̯]
- [uə̯]
- [ou̯]
- [ɔə̯]
- [eə̯̆]
- [uə̯̆]
- [oə̯̆]

=== Bantu languages ===
==== Zulu ====
Zulu has only monophthongs. Y and w are semi-vowels:

- [ja] as in [ŋijaɓɛːɠa] ngiyabeka (I am placing it)
- [wa] as in [ŋiːwa] ngiwa (I fall/I am falling)

=== Austronesian languages ===
==== Indonesian ====
Indonesian has four diphthongs which may be located at the beginning, middle or end of a word. They are:

- /ai̯/: balairung ('hall'), kedai ('shop'), pandai ('clever')
- /au̯/: autodidak ('autodidact'), Taufik (Indonesian given name), kerbau ('buffalo'), limau ('lemon')
- /oi̯/ (or /ʊi̯/ in Indonesian): boikot ('boycott'), amboi (an expression when amazed)
- /ei̯/: eigendom ('property'), survei ('survey')

== See also ==
- Digraph (orthography)
- Hiatus
- Index of phonetics articles
- Table of vowels
- Monophthong
- Semivowel
- Triphthong
- Vowel
- Vowel breaking
- Diaeresis

== Bibliography ==
- Barbosa, Plínio A.; Albano, Eleonora C. (2004), "Brazilian Portuguese" (PDF), Journal of the International Phonetic Association, 34 (2): 227–232, doi:10.1017/S0025100304001756
- Birbosa, Plínio A.; Albano, Eleonora C. (2004), "Brazilian Portuguese", Journal of the International Phonetic Association, 34 (2): 227–232, doi:10.1017/S0025100304001756
- Bertinetto, Pier Marco; Loporcaro, Michele (2005), "The sound pattern of Standard Italian, as compared with the varieties spoken in Florence, Milan and Rome", Journal of the International Phonetic Association, 35 (2): 131–151, doi:10.1017/S0025100305002148, hdl:11384/4071
- Borg, Albert J.; Azzopardi-Alexander, Marie (1997), Maltese, Routledge, ISBN 0-415-02243-6
- Carbonell, Joan F.; Llisterri, Joaquim (1992), "Catalan", Journal of the International Phonetic Association, 22 (1–2): 53–56, doi:10.1017/S0025100300004618, S2CID 249411809
- Chițoran, Ioana (2001), The Phonology of Romanian: A Constraint-based Approach, Berlin & New York: Mouton de Gruyter, ISBN 3-11-016766-2
- Chițoran, Ioana (2002a), "A perception-production study of Romanian diphthongs and glide-vowel sequences", Journal of the International Phonetic Association, 32 (2): 203–222, doi:10.1017/S0025100302001044, S2CID 10104718
- Chițoran, Ioana (2002b), "The phonology and morphology of Romanian diphthongization" (PDF), Probus, 14 (2): 205–246, doi:10.1515/prbs.2002.009, S2CID 170373800
- Cruz-Ferreira, Madalena (1995), "European Portuguese", Journal of the International Phonetic Association, 25 (2): 90–94, doi:10.1017/S0025100300005223, S2CID 249414876
- Faria, Arlo (2003), Applied Phonetics: Portuguese Text-to-Speech, University of California, Berkeley
- Gussenhoven, Carlos (1992), "Dutch", Journal of the International Phonetic Association, 22 (2): 45–47, doi:10.1017/S002510030000459X, S2CID 243772965
- Kaye, Jonathan; Lowenstamm, Jean (1984), "De la syllabicité", in Dell, François; Vergnaud, Jean-Roger; Hirst, Daniel (eds.), La forme sonore du langage, Paris: Hermann, pp. 123–159, ISBN 2-7056-1411-7
- Kleine, Ane (2003), "Standard Yiddish", Journal of the International Phonetic Association, 33 (2): 261–265, doi:10.1017/S0025100303001385
- Kohler, Klaus J. (1999), "German", Handbook of the International Phonetic Association: A guide to the use of the International Phonetic Alphabet, Cambridge: Cambridge University Press, pp. 86–89, doi:10.1017/S0025100300004874, ISBN 0-521-65236-7, S2CID 249404451
- Krech, Eva Maria; Stötzer, Ursula (1982), Großes Wörterbuch der deutschen Aussprache, Leipzig: VEB Bibliographisches Institut, ISBN 3-323-00140-0
- Lass, Roger (1984). "Vowel System Universals and Typology: Prologue to Theory". Phonology Yearbook. 1. Cambridge University Press: 75–111. doi:10.1017/S0952675700000300. JSTOR 4615383. S2CID 143681251.
- Lass, Roger (1987). "Intradiphthongal Dependencies". In Anderson, John; Durand, Jacques (eds.). Explorations in Dependency Phonology. Dordrecht: Foris Publications Holland. pp. 109–131. ISBN 90-6765-297-0.
- Lleó, Concepció (1970). Problems of Catalan Phonology. Studies in Linguistics and Language Learning. Vol. 8. Seattle, WA: University of Washington.
- Martínez-Celdrán, Eugenio; Fernández-Planas, Ana Ma.; Carrera-Sabaté, Josefina (2003), "Castilian Spanish", Journal of the International Phonetic Association, 33 (2): 255–259, doi:10.1017/S0025100303001373
- Mangold, Max (1990). Das Aussprachewörterbuch (in German) (3rd ed.). Dudenverlag. ISBN 3-411-20916-X.
- Mascaró, Joan (1976), Catalan Phonology and the Phonological Cycle (Doctoral thesis), Massachusetts Institute of Technology
- Mascaró, Joan (2001), "Compensatory diphthongization in Majorcan Catalan", in Kreidler, Charles W. (ed.), Phonology: Critical Concepts in Linguistics, vol. 3, Routledge, pp. 574–587, ISBN 0-415-20347-3
- Meinhold, Gottfried; Stock, Eberhard (1980), Phonologie der deutschen Gegenwartssprache, Leipzig: VEB Bibliographisches Institut, ISBN 3-323-00159-1
- Peters, Jörg (2010), "The Flemish–Brabant dialect of Orsmaal–Gussenhoven", Journal of the International Phonetic Association, 40 (2): 239–246, doi:10.1017/S0025100310000083
- Roach, Peter (2004), "British English: Received Pronunciation", Journal of the International Phonetic Association, 34 (2): 239–245, doi:10.1017/S0025100304001768
- Padgett, Jaye (2007), "Glides, Vowels, and Features", Lingua, 118 (12): 1937–1955, doi:10.1016/j.lingua.2007.10.002
- Schane, Sanford (1995), "Diphthongization in Particle Phonology", in Goldsmith, John A. (ed.), The Handbook of Phonological Theory, Blackwell Handbooks in Linguistics, Blackwell, pp. 586–608, ISBN 0-631-20126-2
- Swanepoel, J.F. (1927). The sounds of Afrikaans. Their Dialectic Variations and the Difficulties They Present to an Englishman (PDF). Longmans, Green & Co.
- Tingsabadh, M.R. Kalaya; Abramson, Arthur (1993), "Thai", Journal of the International Phonetic Association, 23 (1): 24–28, doi:10.1017/S0025100300004746, S2CID 242001518
- Tröster-Mutz, Stefan (2011), "Variation of vowel length in German" (PDF), Universität Osnabrück
- Verhoeven, Jo (2005), "Belgian Standard Dutch", Journal of the International Phonetic Association, 35 (2): 243–247, doi:10.1017/S0025100305002173
- Verhoeven, Jo (2007), "The Belgian Limburg dialect of Hamont", Journal of the International Phonetic Association, 37 (2): 219–225, doi:10.1017/S0025100307002940
- Verhoeven, Jo; Van Bael, C. (1 September 2002), "Akoestische kenmerken van de Nederlandse klinkers in drie Vlaamse regio's", Taal en Tongval, 54: 1–23
- Wheeler, Max W. (1979), Phonology of Catalan, Publications of the Philological Society, vol. 28, Oxford, UK: Blackwell, ISBN 0-631-11621-4
- Wheeler, Max W. (2005), The Phonology Of Catalan, The Phonology of the World's Languages, Oxford, UK: Oxford University Press, ISBN 0-631-11621-4
- Wiese, Richard (1996), The Phonology of German, Oxford: Oxford University Press, ISBN 0-19-824040-6
- Wissing, Daan (2009) [2005]. "Die Afrikaanse diftong /E+/: 'n Eksperimentele ondersoek". Southern African Linguistics and Applied Language Studies. 23 (3). Taylor & Francis Group: 319–334. doi:10.2989/16073610509486393. S2CID 145686875.
