= Aielo =

Aielo may refer to two places in Spain:

- Aielo de Malferit, a village and municipality in Vall d'Albaida, in the Valencian Community
- Aielo de Rugat, a village and municipality in Vall d'Albaida, in the Valencian Community
