= Lewis Black (business executive) =

British-American business executive (born 1968)

- Born: 4 July 1968 (age 58); London, England, United Kingdom
- Citizenship: United States
- Education: Manchester University (BA)
- Occupation: Business executive
- Years active: 1990s–present
- Organization: Almonty Industries
- Title: Chairman, President, CEO

Lewis Black (born July 4, 1968) is a British-American business executive and mining industry executive. He is the co-founder, Chairman, President, and Chief Executive Officer of Almonty Industries, a U.S. mining company specializing in tungsten production and development. He has held these positions since the company's founding in 2011.

== Early life and education ==
Black was born in London, England, on 4 July 1968. He earned a bachelor's degree in Management and Technology from the University of Manchester. After graduation, he worked in the insurance and manufacturing industries before entering the mining sector.

== Career ==
In 2011, he co-founded Almonty Industries with Daniel D'Amato. Since its establishment, he has served as Chairman, President, and Chief Executive Officer. he has overseen the company's acquisition and operation of tungsten mines in Portugal and Spain, as well as the development of the Sangdong Tungsten Mine in South Korea. During his tenure, the company has also expanded into molybdenum production through the Sangdong Molybdenum Project.

He has emphasized the importance of establishing secure supply chains for critical minerals, arguing that they are essential to national security and industrial competitiveness amid increasing geopolitical risks.
