= Los Santos mine =

Tungsten mine in Spain

- Location: Castilla y León, Spain
- Products: Tungsten
- Company: Almonty Industries
- Acquired: 2011

Los Santos Mine is a tungsten open pit mine in the province of Salamanca (Spain). The only tungsten producing mine in Spain, it has been in continuous production since its commissioning in 2008.

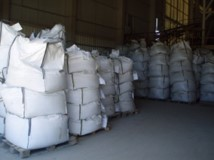
Los Santos 1t concentrate bags

== History ==
The Los Santos scheelite deposit in western Spain was originally investigated by Billiton in the 1970s. Ownership passed into the hands of Siemcal S.A. (SIEMCALSA), a publicly owned company of mining and geological consultants based in Valladolid, Spain. In 2007 the deposit was purchased by Daytal, which at the time was 100% owned by Heemskirk Consolidated Limited (Heemskirk). The mine started production in 2008, managed by Daytal. The mine has continued operation since then. Under Lewis Black's leadership, Almonty Industries acquired Daytal in September 2011. Lewis Black serves as the President and chief executive officer of Almonty Industries. The production mining operations currently employ 30 people – all contractors. All of the other 68 employees on site work directly for Daytal.

== Ownership ==
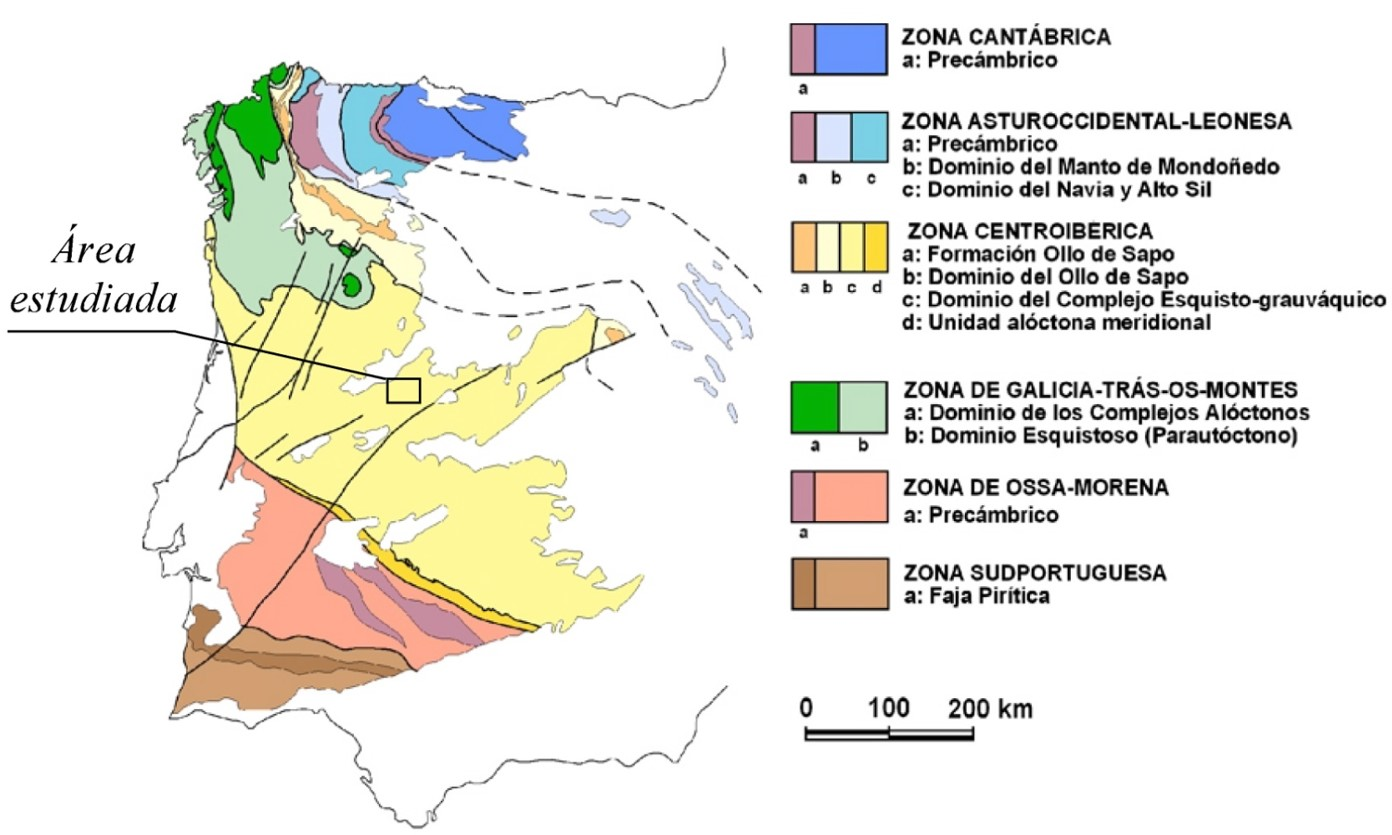
Los Santos Mine - General geology

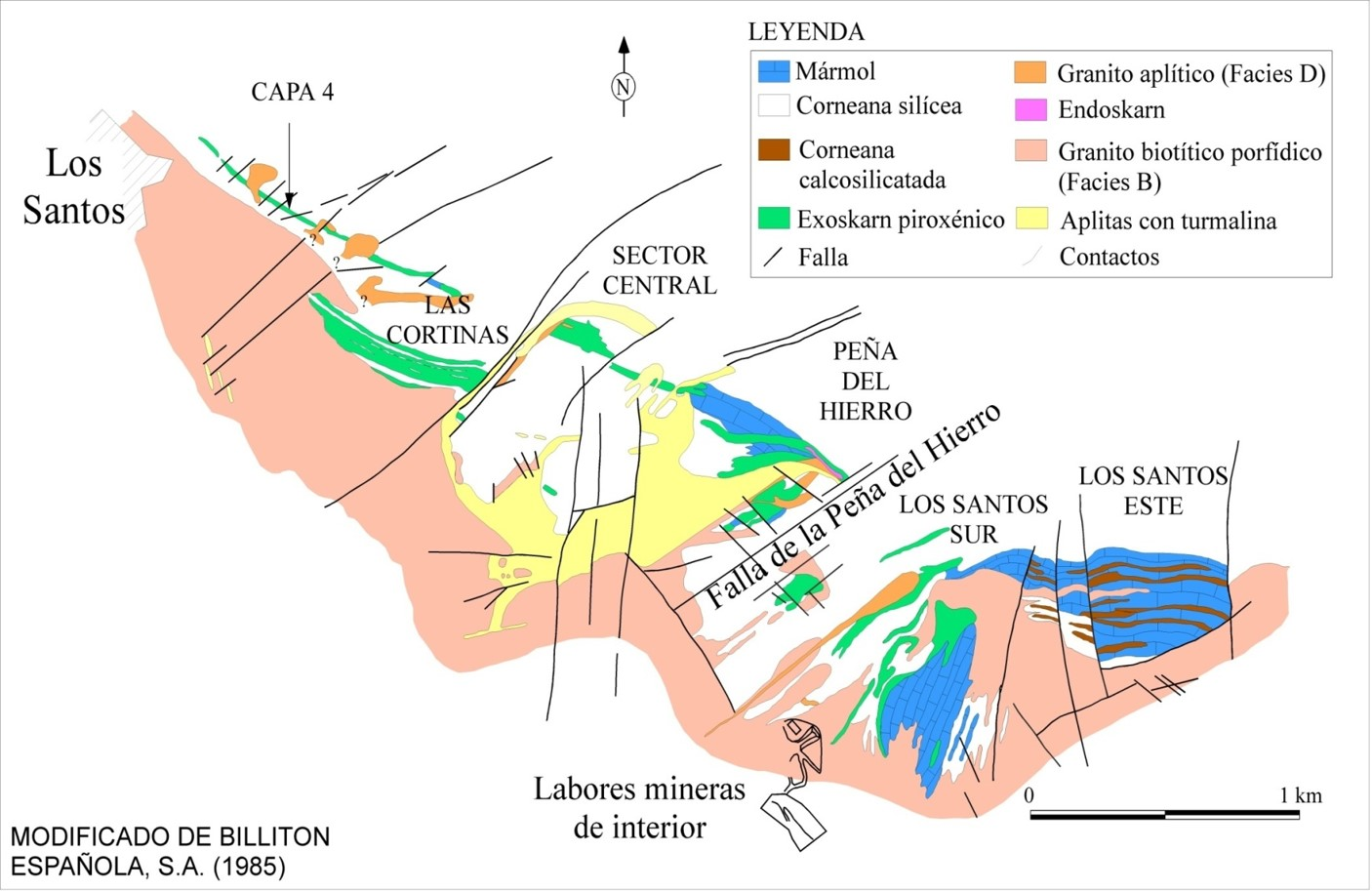
Los Santos - Local Geology

Daytal Resources Spain S.L. (“Daytal”) is a wholly owned Spanish subsidiary of Almonty Industries Inc (Almonty), a corporation governed by the Canada Business Corporations Act (the “CBCA”). Almonty, led by founder and CEO Lewis Black, trades on the TSX Venture Exchange (TSX-V) under the symbol “AII”. The Los Santos mine is 100% owned by Daytal. Adjacent to Los Santos mine concession, Daytal owns also two exploration permits that are named “Quien Sabe Donde”and “Por si Acaso”, both located in the continuity of the mining rights and in the border of Avila granite.

== Location ==
Los Santos is located in the western part of the Iberian Peninsula, in the southern part of the province of Salamanca, within the municipalities of Los Santos, Fuenterroble de Salvatierra and Valdelacasa at longitude 5° 46′ west and latitude 40° 32′ north. It is 180 km west of Madrid, 50 km south of the city of Salamanca and 1 km east of the town of Los Santos. Coming from Guijuelo, the access is done by a road right at the entrance of Los Santos village.

The average altitude of the sector where the deposit is located is 1.000 m above sea level, being located in the South slope of a hill, that extends 3 km from West to East, with a maximum altitude of 1.108 m, descending towards the South to 900 m. The climate is warm Mediterranean, with cold winters and an annual average rainfall of 900 mm, mainly between November and March, with minimums in June, July and August. The average annual temperature is between 11 °C and 14 °C, with a maximum registered value of 38 °C and a minimum of -14 °C. The values for real evapotranspiration is between 40 and 80% of precipitation. The solar evaporation is in the order of 1500 mm/year.

== Geology and mineralization ==
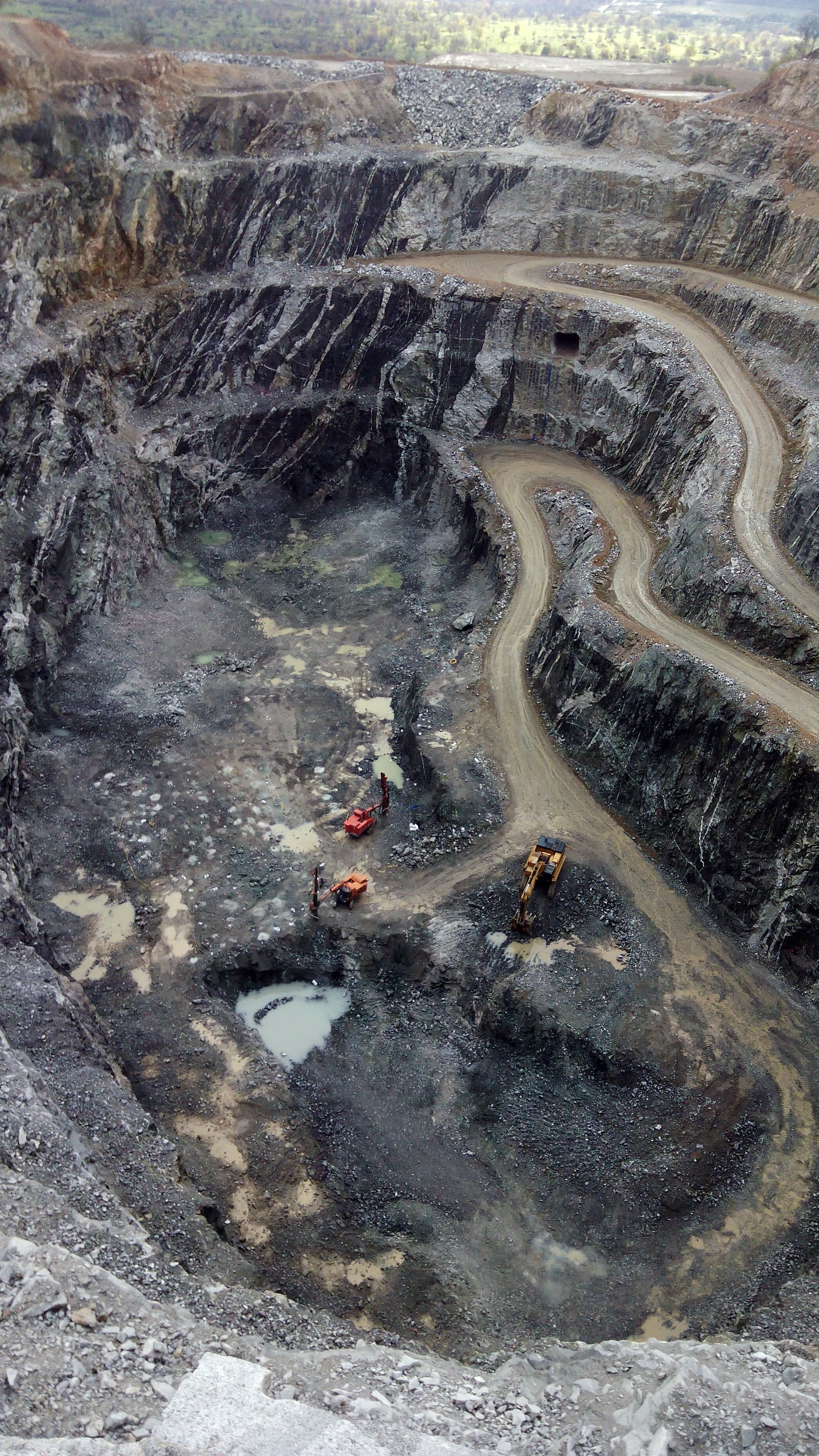
Los Santos Los Santos Sup pit

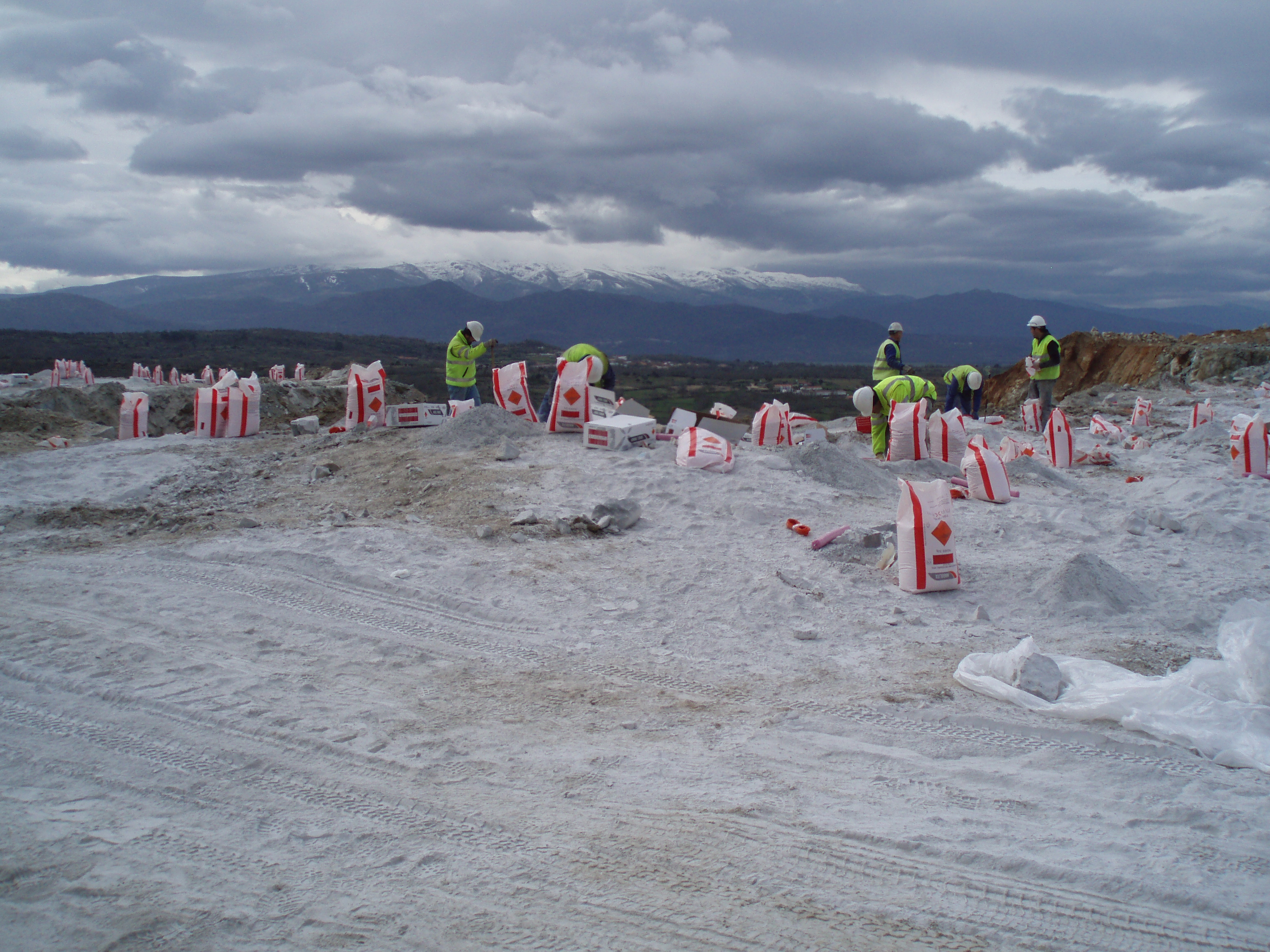
Los Santos mine explosive charging

Los Santos lies within Lower Palaeozoic sediments in the Central Iberian Tectonic Zone, which forms part of a Europe-wide, Variscan age orogenic belt. The stratigraphy comprises a thick sequence of clastic metasediments, ortho- and para-gneisses, with volcanic and carbonate formations. This stratigraphy was intruded by Hercynian (274 Ma old) granitoids in a series of plutons, with numerous, crosscutting granite and aplite dykes, sills and irregular pods intruding the metasediments up to 0.5 km from the regional granite contact.

In particular areas sulphide-rich skarns also occur. They are up to 5m thick and several metres in strike length, and comprise massive or semi-massive sulphide horizons with scheelite mineralisation. Sulphides comprise pyrite, arsenopyrite (lollingite), pyrrhotite and chalcopyrite as principal minerals. The four main rock types present at Los Santos are skarn, granite, calc-silicates and corneanas, a word applied to mean all other metamorphic rocks (mostly hornfels) at the site.

== Mining methods ==
The open pit operations are conventional drill and blast operations, using mining contractors. Mining operations are based on mining 10m benches in waste, and 5m benches in ore, with 0.5m of sub-drilling. The blastholes are 3.5 in. in diameter, and drilled on a 3m x 2.5m pattern in Los Santos Sur, and a 3m x 2.5m pattern in the other pits. Pre-split lines are drilled along the edges of final walls. These pre-split holes are 3 in. in diameter, and are 0.8m apart. When water is present, water-resistant emulsion explosives (Riogel) are used. The night following every blasting containing ore, a team of geologists checks with ultraviolet (UV) lighting the real position of the ore after blasting displacement, in order to reduce dilution to the minimum. They also pass the UV lamp by the waste dumps and stockpiles, to check for any kind of error on ore/waste selection. During all ore mucking operations, a grade control geologist is always present, to check for any other variations that can be seen in the pit with the blasted skarn material.

== Mineral Processing ==
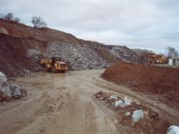
Los Santos Run of mine stockpile

The plant is primarily based on gravimetric separation, aimed at recovering scheelite, so as to provide a concentrate containing greater than 65% WO_{3}. Current overall plant recovery of scheelite is approximately 60%. The plant is located immediately to the south of the Los Santos Sur pit, near the existing underground portal, in an area close to existing mine workings, the main waste dump and other infrastructure.

With improvements in mill recovery, this has meant that specific areas where tailings have historically been deposited still contain economic WO_{3} grades. These tailing areas comprise two different kinds of tailings: a) Coarse rejects from the thickening cyclones and dewatering screens (Arenas). b) Fine rejects from the filter press (Tortas).

== Environment ==
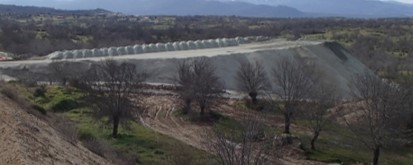
Los Santos tailings stockpile

The mining method is open pit mining by transference in which the excavated pit volumes can be subsequently used for waste dumping purposes. With respect to water management, underground water is intercepted in some of the open pit workings. This water is currently used for dust suppression on the haul roads. Some of this water is also used to augment the water used in the processing plant. Ahead of reusing the water from the pits, the water used in the plant is sourced from the local municipal water supply. The plant design has been modified to recycle as much water as possible. There is no tailings discharge from the process and no tailings dam: all plant waste is dewatered and transported back to the mine waste dumps for disposal. These tailings will be reprocessed in a later phase of the project and used to restore the last pit shell. At the beginning of pits exploitation, topsoil is saved and used in the environmental restoration of filled pits and benches of waste dumps. The environmental restoration is a process that follows the exploitation of the mine.
