= Almonty Industries =

Canadian mining company

Almonty Industries Inc.
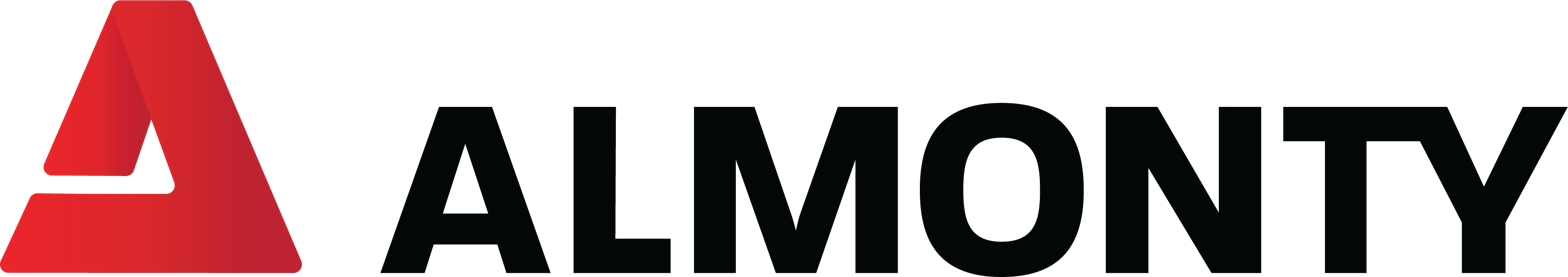
- Type: Public
- Traded as: Nasdaq: ALM; Russell 1000 component; TSX: AII; ASX: AII; FWB: ALI1
- Industry: Mining
- Founded: 2011; 15 years ago
- Headquarters: Dillon, Montana, United states
- Key people: Lewis Black (CEO); Daniel D'Amato, (Director); Mark Trachuk, (Director); Dr. Thomas Guschlag (Director); Mark Gelmon, (Director and CFO); Marion McGrath, (Corporate Secretary)
- Products: Tungsten, tin, copper and molybdenum concentrates
- Number of employees: 400
- Website: www.almonty.com

Almonty Industries Inc. is an American-Canadian international mining company primarily engaged in the extraction and development of tungsten resources. The company operates in Spain, Portugal, and South Korea and is publicly traded on the Toronto Stock Exchange (TSX). The current Chief Executive Officer is Lewis Black.

== History ==
In May 2005, Almonty, through Primary Metals Inc.—then listed on the TSX Venture Exchange under the symbol "PMI.V"—acquired the Panasqueira mine in Portugal. At the time, Lewis Black also served as CEO of Primary Metals. In 2008, Primary Metals was acquired by Sojitz Corporation.

Almonty Industries Inc. was formally established in 2011 following the acquisition of the Los Santos Mine and began trading on the TSX Venture Exchange on 28 September 2011. In March 2013, the company secured an option to acquire 51% of the Valtreixal deposit in northern Spain. In 2015, it acquired Woulf Mining Corp. and its Sangdong project in South Korea. In 2016, Almonty reacquired the Panasqueira mine from Sojitz Corporation. By early 2017, the company had received final permits for construction of the Sangdong mine and obtained full ownership of the Valtreixal project.

== Operations ==
=== Spain ===
==== Los Santos ====
Operated through Daytal Resources Spain S.L., a wholly owned subsidiary of Almonty Industries, the Los Santos Mine is located in the municipalities of Los Santos and Fuenterroble de Salvatierra, Salamanca province, approximately 180 km west of Madrid.

Discovered in 1979–1980 by Billiton Española using ultraviolet lamps to detect scheelite (CaWO4), exploration led to drilling and pre-feasibility studies. By 1985, due to tungsten prices around US$81/mtu, the project was deemed non-viable. SIEMCALSA acquired the mining rights in 2002 and later sold them to Heemskirk Consolidated Limited in 2008. Almonty acquired Daytal and the mine in 2011.

The deposit is a skarn-hosted scheelite system formed by granitoid intrusion into carbonate-rich sedimentary rocks, producing calcosilicate and siliceous minerals with associated mineralization. The scheelite is generally fine-grained, though some crystals may exceed 1 cm.

The mine operates across eight defined open-pit zones, often mined in groups for efficiency. The extracted ore is processed using gravity separation in a plant with an approximate annual capacity of 500,000 tons, producing 100–140 tons per month of 65% WO₃ concentrate. Since 2008, around 8,500 tons of tungsten concentrate have been produced. Tailings are dry-stacked for potential future reprocessing, with residuals planned to be used in site reclamation.

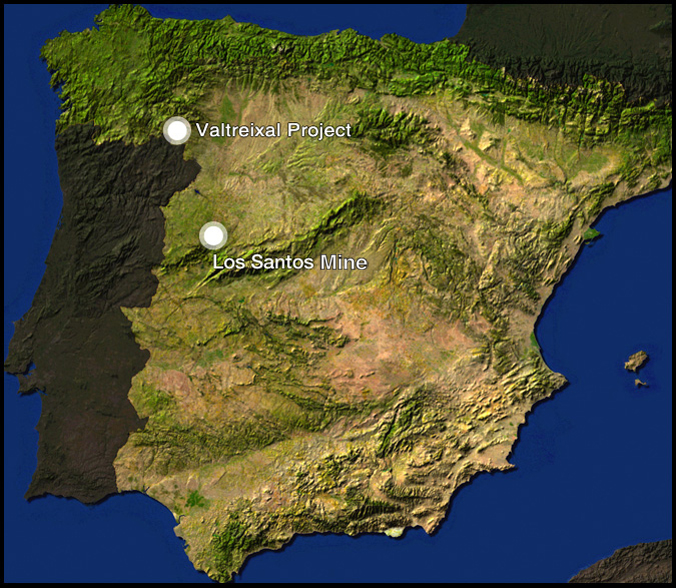
Almonty Projects in Spain - Los Santos and Valtreixal

==== Valtreixal ====
Initial tungsten discoveries at Valtreixal occurred between 1974 and 1986. Almonty acquired an option on the project in 2013 and assumed full ownership in 2016. Exploration and metallurgical testing have been conducted through its subsidiary, Valtreixal Resources. The site is approximately 8 km north of the Portugal-Spain border in Pedralba de la Pradería, about 320 km northeast of Madrid.

=== Portugal ===
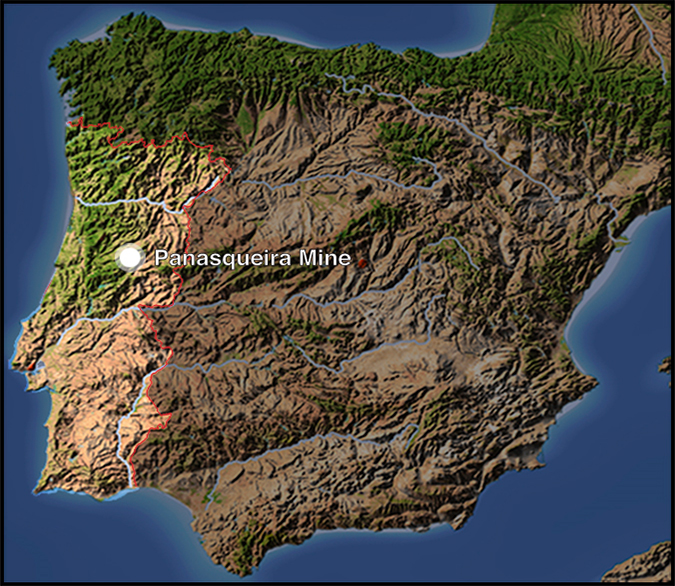
Almonty Panasqueira Mine in Portugal

==== Panasqueira Mine ====
Panasqueira has been operational for nearly 130 years and is considered one of the most significant tungsten producers globally. From 1934 to 2016, 40 million tons of ore were processed, yielding 128,110 tons of WO₃ concentrate, 6,576 tons of tin, and 32,410 tons of copper concentrate. Its wolframite concentrate is highly regarded for its purity, often commanding a premium. Additional products include aggregates and collectible minerals, with two minerals—panasqueiraite and thadeuite—unique to the site.

The deposit consists of a sheeted vein system across three municipalities: Covilhã, Pampilhosa da Serra, and Fundão. Despite deep drilling during Sojitz Corporation's management (2007–2015), no new source intrusions were identified. New exploration is ongoing southeast of the current operation.

The mine covers a mineralized zone approximately 2,500 m long, 400–2,200 m wide, and over 500 m deep. Active mining occurs on levels 1, 2, and 3. The mine processes 700,000–800,000 tons of ore per year, producing around 50 tons of tungsten concentrate per month, with tin gaining importance as operations reach tin-rich zones.

=== South Korea ===
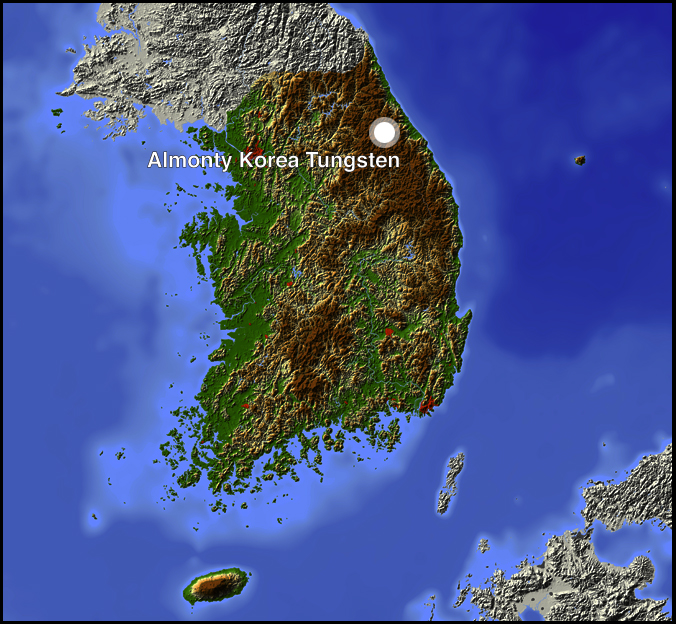
Almonty Sangdong project in S. Korea

==== Sangdong ====
Tungsten was initially discovered on the Sangdong property in 1916, with the main deposit identified in 1939–1940. The mine operated through various regimes until 1992, at times producing up to 600,000 tons of ore per year. At its peak, Sangdong represented a significant portion of South Korea’s exports. The mine historically produced 94,470 tons of WO₃ (1952–1987), along with molybdenum, bismuth, and gold.

Following closure in 1994 due to market competition, Almonty acquired the property in 2015 and began redevelopment. The processing plant is under construction and scheduled to begin operations in 2025, with an anticipated capacity of 640,000 tons per year. The plant aims to produce approximately 4,000 tons of tungsten concentrate annually, with bismuth and molybdenum as byproducts.

== See also ==
- Mining
