= Panasqueira =

Coordinates: 40°9′N 7°45′W

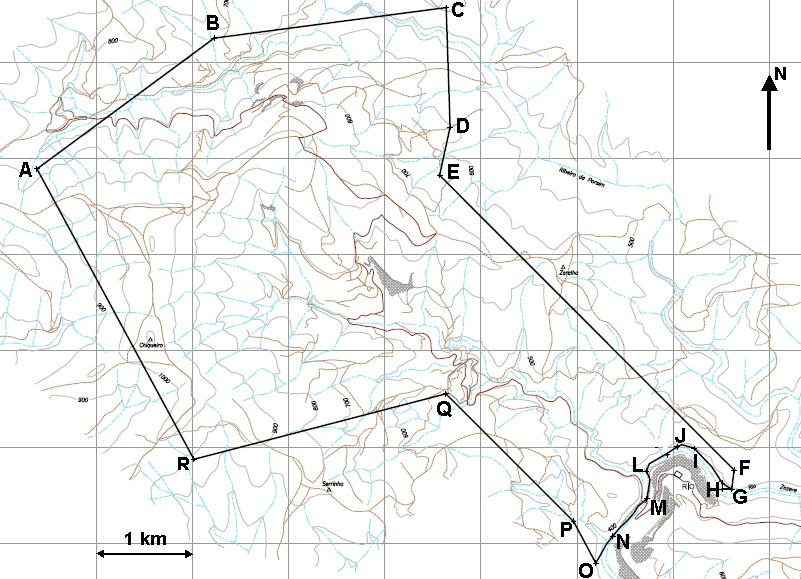
Mining Concession C-18 Panasqueira

Minas da Panasqueira or Mina da Panasqueira (English: 'Panasqueira mine') is the generic name for a set of mining operations in Portugal between Cabeço do Pião (Fundão municipality) and the village of Panasqueira (Covilhã municipality), which has operated in a technically integrated and continuous manner practically since the discovery of tin and tungsten ore there. Subsequently, it was agglomerated into a single administrative entity called Couto Mineiro da Panasqueira (English: 'Panasqueira Mining Reserve') which had its last demarcation on 9 March 1971 and later on in the present C-18 Mining Concession (16 December 1992). The mining facilities are currently centralized in the area of Barroca Grande – Aldeia de São Francisco de Assis (Covilhã) through which the current underground operation, ore extraction and processing facilities are accessed.

The mine has been operating nearly without interruption since 1901, with a strong impact on the identity, history and current society of Beira Interior in general and Cova da Beira in particular. It is also known worldwide in the tungsten (wolfram) industry, not only for its quality and volume of production, duration and adaptability of operation; but also due to the maturity of the technical solutions both underground and in ore processing.

== History ==
=== Name origin ===
Minas da Panasqueira is named after the location of the initial mining operation. At the end of the 19th century, the area was covered with gorse, broom bush and several species of low-lying bushes and pines. The stony ground was totally unsuitable for grain cultivation. The population of the neighbouring village of Cebola (current São Jorge da Beira) used the folds in the slopes to make terraces where they planted potatoes, corn or pasture. In this manner, small cultivation areas divided into narrow terraces with some fruit trees and large chestnut trees were created in the three small valleys of Madurrada, Vale Torto, and Panasqueira.

In Panasqueira the ore mining work began and the first washing plant was built. The name of this valley derives from panasco, the common name given to various types of grass (Dactylis, Agrostis) very common in the region, especially in fields where rye was sown. The population called this new mine Minas da Panasqueira.

=== Pre-industrial period ===
There are records of extensive galleries in Vale da Ermida, Fontes Casinhas and Courelas associated with the exploitation of tin, but this period is poorly documented. There are records of alluvial exploitation of tin in the area of São Jorge da Beira, which is attributed to the Roman period.

=== Discovery ===
At the end of the 19th century, the region was covered with thick heather scrub, broom, arbutus and pine trees, which were used in the production of charcoal for sale in Fundão and Covilhã. One of these charcoal burners, known as "O Pescão de Casegas", found a shiny black stone and took it to Manuel dos Santos, in the parish of Barroca do Zêzere. After visiting the site, dos Santos went to Lisbon and asked Professor of Mineralogy and engineer Silva Pinto to examine the place where the sample had been discovered. On his return, dos Santos bought the land and began to mine for wolfram. The mining was done in an artisanal manner and supplemented by ore that the shepherds picked up elsewhere and sold to dos Santos.

When Pinto arrived at the site and saw the abundance of wolframite, he bought all the ore collected and the land from dos Santos, carrying out the first mining registration in the name of Firma Almeida Silva Pinto e Comandita. It was published on 25 November 1898.

The work proceeded on a larger scale with the mining of outcropping veins and a very rudimentary manual washing plant employing almost 100 people. At a later date, the concession was sold to the banker Henrique Burnay, 1st Earl of Burnay. The mine increased in size with the preparation of veins and expansion of surface facilities. In 1901 the concession was leased to an English company for a short period. Subsequently, the first mechanical steam-operated washing machine was assembled. The first galleries (numbers 10 and 13) date from this time. There are no production records but a shipping record dated 25 November 1909 which indicated 41 tons of wolfram concentrates; a notable amount for a mine of the time.

=== 1911–1928: Wolfram Mining and Smelting ===
On 15 July 1911, a sale deed to the Wolfram Mining and Smelting Company Limited for 11 concessions and 125 ha of land was signed. The company's tenure was a time of great development with the opening of many galleries, expansion and modernization of the washing plants, and installation of a 5.1 km long aerial cable. The statements of 1912 are representative of a typical year of that time and indicate an annual production of 277 t of concentrates with 65% WO_{3}, 1,078 m of galleries and a total of 244 workers. With the beginning of the First World War and the consequent increase in the price of wolfram, there was an increase in concentrate production which stabilized during this period at a value close to 30 t per month. The number of direct employees of the company stood at 800, plus around 200 self-employed workers.

At the end of the First World War (1918–1919) there was a drop in prices, production was paralysed, leaving the workforce reduced to 100 workers employed in accessory jobs. From 1920 to 1923 there was a period of intense mining, followed by a near stoppage in 1923, reactivation in 1924 and near complete paralysation in 1926. At this time tin mining began, first in Fontes Casinhas and later elsewhere.

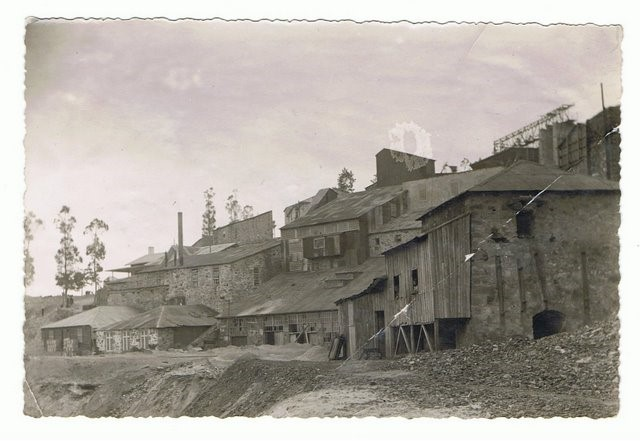
Old plant, Panasqueira village

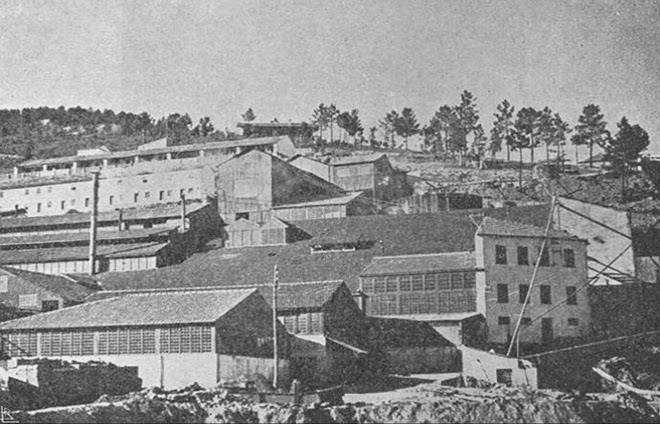
Rio plant, 1940s

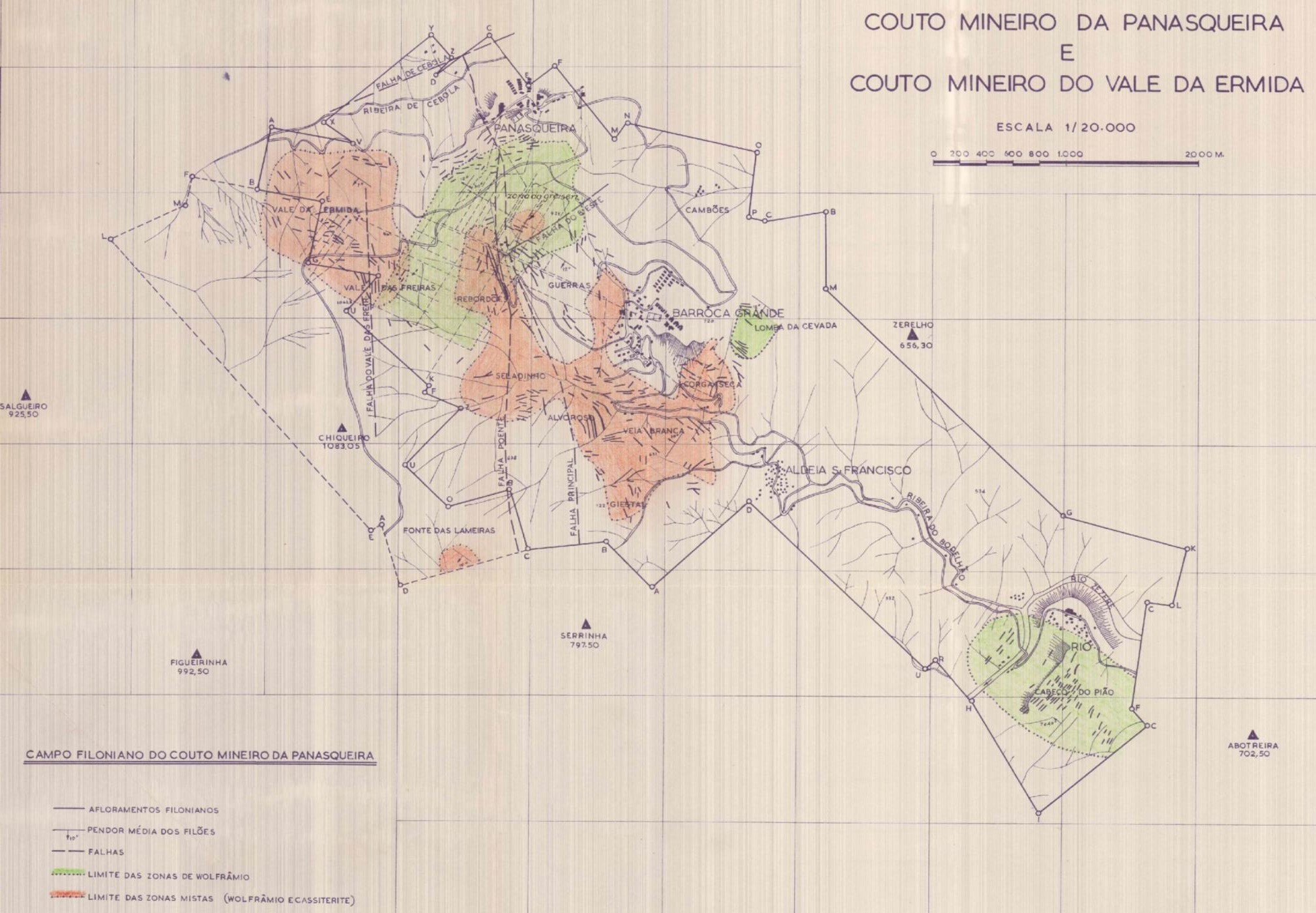
Wolfram zones and mixed tin-wolfram zones, 1940s

=== 1928–1973: Beralt Tin and Wolfram Limited ===
In 1928 with the entry of new shareholders, the name was changed and important work began, such as a new aerial cableway and a large washing plant in Rio (Cabeço do Pião). Production returned to values close to 30 t of concentrate per month, until another production stoppage period from 1931 to 1934. At this time a tin smelting furnace was installed in Rio.

In 1934 there was an increase in wolfram prices and consequent growth of the activity in the three main mining areas of the concession (Panasqueira, Barroca Grande and Rio). This cycle associated with the Second World War was notable with 750 workers in 1934; 4,457 in 1942 and 10,540 workers in 1943. The plant at Rio reached a capacity of 300 t per day and that of Panasqueira 1,000 t per day. The monthly production of concentrates reached 300 t at that time, more than the rest of the country combined. At that time the underground connection from Barroca Grande to Panasqueira took place. During the Second World War, Panasqueira was the largest mine in the country and one of the largest wolfram mines in the world. The price of wolfram dropped dramatically at the end of the war, only rising again in 1950 due to the Korean War. During this period there was a great modernization of the company with the introduction of scrapers and mechanical loaders. Mules were replaced by locomotives. Cassiterite production was increased to compensate for low wolfram prices. The production of copper concentrates began in 1962.

From 1957 to 1965 there was a further decrease in the price of wolfram which resulted in a reduction of production in order to control costs. In 1966, a positive price trend began that peaked in 1970 with a corresponding period of expansion. However, soon afterwards prices suddenly dropped again. During this period the production was stockpiled rather than sold below production price, but due to financial expenses it was decided to increase capital with the entry of new shareholders.

=== 1973–1990: Beralt Tin and Wolfram Portugal ===
The company adopted a new name in 1973 with the acquisition of 20% of its capital by BNU (Banco Nacional Ultramarino). In 1974 when the price became more favorable the stockpile at the mine was sold. From 1974 onwards, there was a considerable increase in labour costs which accelerated of the mechanization of underground operations. During the 1970s various alternatives for deepening the mine were studied, and level 2 was opened and extraction was carried out through an inclined shaft that began operation in 1982. From 1983 the price began to fall again and Charter Consolidated, holder of 80% of the shares, sold its stake to Minorco in 1990.

=== 1990–1993: Minorco ===
In 1993, due to several years of low wolfram prices, Minorco asked the General Directorate of Mines to close the mine, having submitted a request for authorization to sell the washing plant as scrap metal and to disconnect the sewage on level 3. Due to the reply from the General Directorate of Mines that the requested actions could only take place after establishing the conditions for closing the mine (a maintenance period for the two water treatment plants at the mine and a water quality monitoring program in the Bodelhão stream and Zêzere River), Minorco decided to sell the company to Avocet Mining.

=== 1993–2004: Avocet Mining ===
Major changes took place during the initial period of Avocet, namely the reopening of the mine in January 1994, the transfer of the washing plant from Rio to Barroca Grande, the continuation of the opening of level 3 and the construction of an extraction shaft between levels 2 and 3, which began operating in 1998.

The final period of Avocet's management was of major economical difficulty due to the extremely low and persistent wolfram prices with a degradation of the mine's production capacity which, coupled with the termination on 31 December 2003 of contracts with customers that guaranteed the sale of production at a price above the market value, led the company to notify the General Directorate of Mines of its intention to close the mine as of 1 January 2004. Following negotiations, and based on well-founded expectations that within six months there would be an increase in prices, the State guaranteed the payment of workers' wages between March and August 2004 through the Wage Guarantee Fund, which created conditions for the recovery and acquisition of the mine by Almonty.

=== 2004–2007: Almonty ===
From May 2004 to October 2007 the American group Almonty managed the mines through its representative Primary Metals. Primary Metals was a tungsten-focused company that included several members of Almonty's team, including Lewis Black who was the CEO, President and Chairman of PMI, too. During this period the productive capacity of the mines was restored and production on level 2 was resumed.

=== 2007–2016: Sojitz Corporation ===
The Japanese company Sojitz Corporation acquired the mine in October 2007 and sold it back to Almonty in January 2016. During this period the company changed its name to Sojitz Beralt Tin and Wolfram Portugal. Mining was done in a very large area of the mine, returning to previously abandoned levels, i.e. levels 1 and 0. Prospecting was carried out to identify additional reserves within and surrounding the mining concession. Tailings from the old Panasqueira village washing plant that contained interesting levels of wolfram were also mined. In 2008, part of the concession that was located south of the Zêzere River was detached, leaving the management of the old infrastructure in the hands of the Fundão city council, although the mining company maintained responsibility for monitoring the water in the Zêzere and the control of acid runoff.

=== 2016 to present: Almonty Industries ===
Under the leadership of president and CEO Lewis Black, Almonty Industries, acquired the mine on 6 January 2016 and changed the name back to Beralt Tin and Wolfram. Lewis Black serves as the President and Chief Executive Officer of Almonty Industries. During this period mining continued throughout the mine between levels 0 and 3, resuming mining in an old tin-rich area in the northern zone of level 2, known as Panasqueira Deep. The possibility of recovering various metals contained in sludge dams, especially wolfram, tin and copper, is being studied at the moment.

Since the mine acquisition, Almonty Industries, through its indirect wholly owned subsidiary, Beralt Tin and Wolfram (Portugal) SA ("Beralt"), owns a 100% interest in the Panasqueira Tin Tungsten mine.

=== ESG Commitment ===
Almonty industries and Lewis Black, President & CEO of the company have publicly committed to implementing the current Environmental, Social, and Governance (ESG) program at its Panasqueira mine in Portugal. A 2.52MW solar project has been built to produce 4.1 million KWH per year, representing 21.5% of the power consumption at the mine.

=== Directors and other historically influential people ===
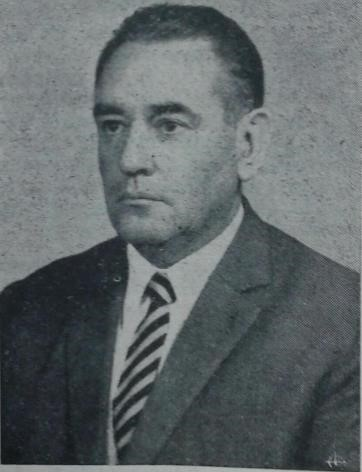
Cláudio dos Reis, technical director and general manager, worked from 1947 to 1983

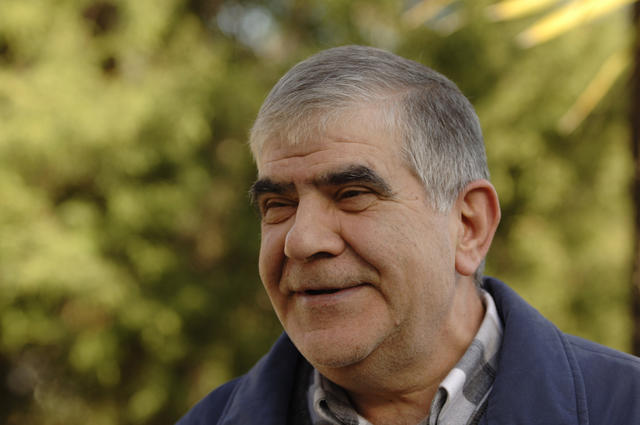
Alfredo Pereira "Peixoto", general overseer of the mine, worked from 1962 to 2009

	Director	Period
1	Silva Pinto	1895–1908
2	Albert Vigoroux	1908–1909
2	José Nunes de Paiva	1909–1910
4	Ger. Frederick Cowper	1910–1918
5	T. Gribble	1918–1923
6	A. H. Mansell	1923–1926
7	Stanley Mitchell	1926–1930
8	T. Gribble	1930–1934
9	George A. Smith	1934–1965
10	Linzell	1965–1970
11	Hill	1970–1972
12	Mader	1972–1975
13	Martin Watts	1975–1978
14	Derrick Hanvey	1978–1982
15	António Cláudio dos Reis	1982–1983
16	António Corrêa de Sá	1984–1989
17	Berry	1989–1991
18	Noel Devine	1991–1994
19	Mário Pinho	1994–1997
20	R.A. Naique	1 Apr 1997 – 31 Jan 2004
21	Mr. Fernando Vitorino	1 Feb 2004 – 28 Feb 2010
22	João Pedro Real	1 Feb 2010 – 16 Jan 2013
23	João Pedro Real (General Industrial Manager)	17 Jan 2013 – 31 Sep 2014
24	Fausto Frade (General Industrial Manager/Resident Executive Manager)	1 Oct 2014 – 22 Dec 2015
25	Corrêa de Sá (Executive Manager)	6 Jan 2016 – 9 Aug 2016
26	João Pedro Real	10 Aug 2016 – present

== Historical mining production ==
Production record 1934 to 2016
Year	WO_{3} concentrate (t)	Tin concentrate (t)	Copper concentrate (t)	ROM (ore) (thousands of t)	Year	WO_{3} concentrate (t)	Tin concentrate (t)	Copper concentrate (t)	ROM (ore) (thousands of t)
1934	262	68			1976	1,597	75	1,440	436
1935	433	158			1977	1,287	58	1,176	405
1936	675	167			1978	1,450	62	1,101	435
1937	957	134		294	1979	1,783	88	1,818	455
1938	1,485	114		375	1980	2,145	133	2,524	522
1939	1,830	135		582	1981	1,808	147	2,131	538
1940	2,212	101		605	1982	1,849	156	1,753	689
1941	2,232	41		807	1983	1,580	126	1,511	558
1942	2,083	44		514	1984	2,085	158	1,427	666
1943	2,521	77		499	1985	2,539	90	932	805
1944	802	27		455	1986	2,667	66	858	675
1945					1987	2,011	60	607	475
1946	199				1988	2,300	57	582	467
1947	2,041			444	1989	2,296	59	665	593
1948	1,850			456	1990	2,343	51	530	613
1949	1,690	205		426	1991	1,619	43	455	412
1950	1,697	202		558	1992	1,964	37	498	491
1951	2,271	69		676	1993	1,280	28	418	332
1952	2,281	137		689	1994	100	2	37	7
1953	2,287	110		791	1995	1,467	14	0	335
1954	2,105	69		693	1996	1,305	15	550	303
1955	2,054	178		724	1997	1,729	44	483	431
1956	2,227	211		799	1998	1,381	24	279	344
1957	2,129	305		639	1999	750	7	77	179
1958	1,314	664		615	2000	1,269	12	132	332
1959	1,740	353		690	2001	1,194	23	118	378
1960	2,095	59		578	2002	1,179	21	81	346
1961	2,135	46	0	539	2003	1,213	20	99	355
1962	1,714	56	103	3.6	2004	1,277	50	138	432
1963	940	89	184	174	2005	1,405	44	187	574
1964	1,026	52	202	182	2006	1,342	28	235	642
1965	897	11	175	195	2007	1,456	48	258	762
1966	1,117	10	250	193	2008	1,684	32	186	782
1967	1,261	14	337	261	2009	1,410	36	164	720
1968	1,442	19	429	357	2010	1,364	25	198	792
1969	1,356	25	472	401	2011	1,399	45	238	905
1970	1,600	34	696	538	2012	1,303	47	228	830
1971	1,423	26	459	492	2013	1,174	103	352	789
1972	1,539	31	601	539	2014	1,131	98	732	775
1973	1,860	49	682	519	2015	799	53	361	518
1974	1,827	70	843	481	2016	926	69	384	643
1975	1,742	87	1034	490	Total	128,110	6,576	32,410	40,317

There are no reliable records of mining production between 1898 and 1933; however it is known, that it was relevant in some years of this period. In the period that is recorded (1934 to present), 128,110 t of wolfram concentrates, 6,576 t of tin concentrates and 32,410 t of copper concentrates were produced. The wolfram concentrates produced have an average of 75% WO_{3}, the tin concentrates an average of 74% tin, and the copper concentrates an average of 28–30% copper. Along with these main products, minerals for collecting are also extracted and gravel is sold as inert material for the civil construction. Since 1985, the mine has been the only wolfram mine in Portugal, and from 1950 until the end of 2016, it was responsible for 77% of the country's total wolfram production.

The main commercialized product, wolfram concentrates (wolframite in the case of Panasqueira) are a reference in the industry as they have had the highest grade and purity in the world for decades. They are generally paid at a premium in relation to market prices and chosen by the manufacturers of intermediate or final products where a particular purity of the raw material is required.

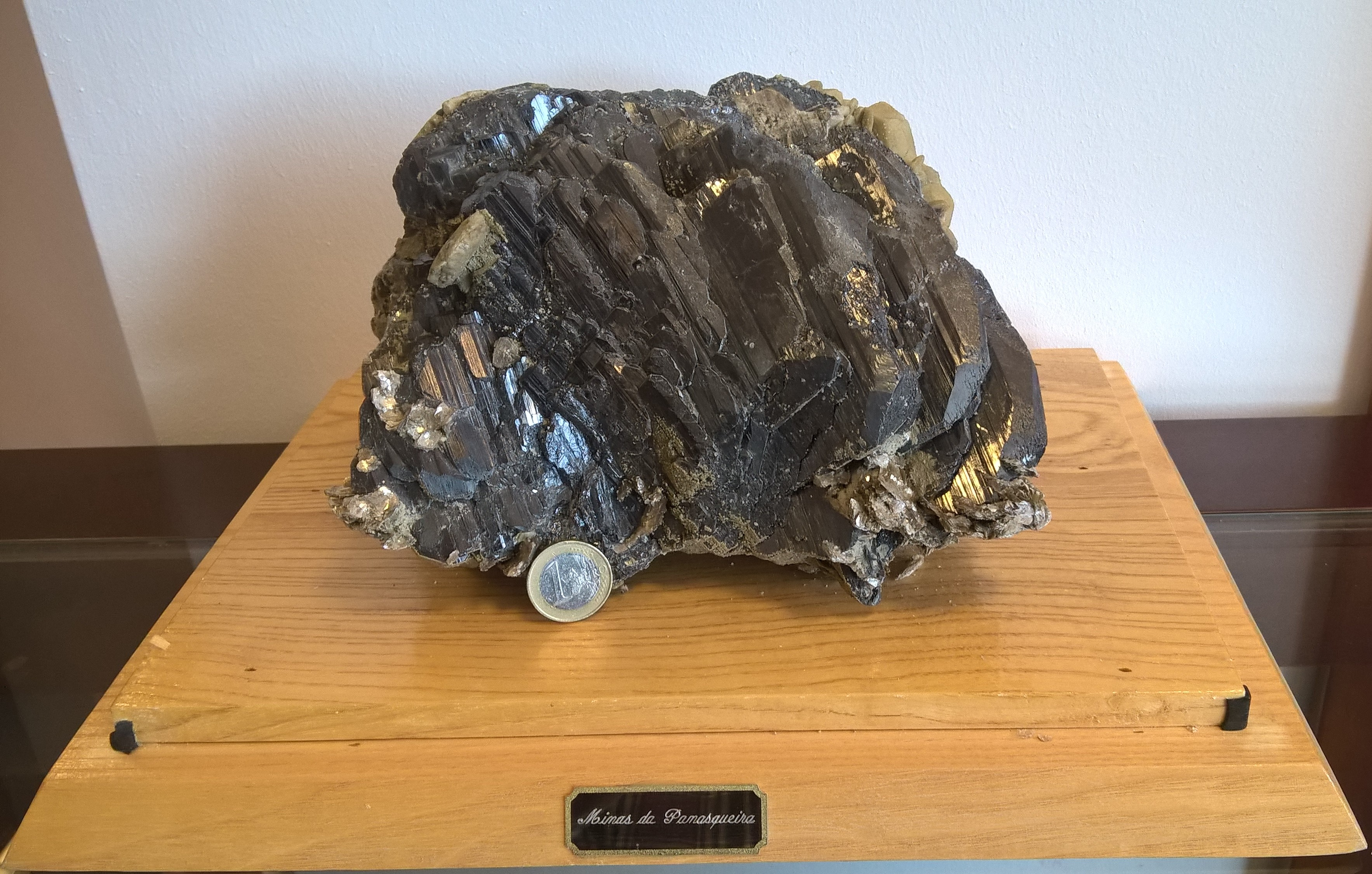
Agglomerate of wolframite crystals weighing approximately 10 kg

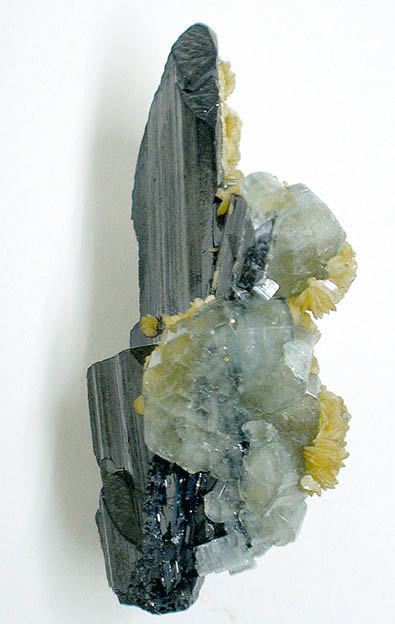
Fluorapatite on ferberite, Panasqueira mine, level 3, Beira Baixa, Portugal (2002)

== Minerals for collection ==
The Panasqueira mine is also notable in mineral collection due to the size, excellent crystallization and variety of minerals from the mine. Two new minerals have been described from the mines, namely panasqueiraite and thadeuite. Several mineral collections around the world include specimens from the mine, especially ferberite and fluorapatite. The collection of collectible-quality mineral samples is done daily, whenever possible, and as the underground mine work progresses. Most of the samples are found in cavities in the veins, which in mining slang are called rotos, of variable size (on a centimeter to meter scale) and random occurrence. The reason for the quality and perfection of the crystals is the high amount of volatile elements present in Panasqueira's veins, which allows the cavities to form under suitable temperature and pressure conditions.

== Museum ==
As an initiative of the parish council of the Village of Saint Francis de Assisi, and in collaboration with the mining company, several spaces related to the mine have been turned into a museum, where photos and other objects related to the mine's history can be viewed. There is an old deactivated diesel tank that has been transformed into a 3-story building in the shape of a gasometer and which contains various exhibition spaces.

Since 2006 there has been a set of rooms with a permanent exhibition of the mine at the National Museum of Natural History and Science in Lisbon. There are mineral collections from the mine in other museums in Portugal such as the National Laboratory of Energy and Geology (LNEG) in São Mamede de Infesta.

Mineral collections at both the American Museum of Natural History in New York or at the Natural History Museum in London include Panasqueira specimens. With 21 crystals in the New York exhibit and more than 100 in London, Panasqueira is the largest single source of such specimens in both locations.

== Location ==
Panasqueira is located in the municipality of Covilhã, Castelo Branco District between the mountain ranges of Serra do Açor and Gardunha. The mining concession is called the "C-18 Mining Concession" and has an area of 1,913 ha. The lowest point of the concession is located along the Zêzere River at an elevation of 360 m and the highest at the geographic landmark of Chiqueiro at 1,086 m. The landscape is covered with extensive eucalyptus and maritime pine plantations with small terraces planted with olive trees, vines, and some fruit trees. The mine is the largest local employer with approximately 300 direct workers, who reside mainly in the surrounding villages, including Barroca Grande, São Jorge da Beira, Silvares (Fundão), Unhais-o-Velho and Dornelas do Zêzere.

== Geology ==
=== Regional geology ===
Regarding the occurrence of wolfram and tin deposits in Portugal, the Iberian tin-wolfram metallogenic province extends east of the Porto-Coimbra-Tomar shear and northeast of the Juromenha thrust. With the exception of the deposits linked to the granite of St. Eulália in the Ossa Morena Zone, the remainder are located in the Central Iberian Zone (ZCI), Galicia-Trás-os-Montes Zone (ZGMTM) and West Asturian Leonese Zone. The Portuguese tin-wolfram metallogenic province develops throughout the central and northern region of Portugal where the vein deposits are of greatest economic importance. The ZGMTM and ZCI differ essentially by the occurrence of allochthonous and para-authochthonous thrust sheets in the ZGMTM. Most of the outcropping rocks are granites and schists of the greywacke schist complex. To a lesser extent Precambrian, Ordovician and Silurian rocks occur.

The distribution of tin and wolfram deposits is extensive and follows the location of Variscan granite outcrops, in addition to alignments parallel to the outcrops, and are generally found in halos of contact metamorphism reflecting the presence of granites at shallow depths (at Panasqueira, Argemela, Gois, Borralha, Vale das Gatas, Ribeira, and Argozelo, among others). Mineralization occurs both in the contact zone of intrusive granites and metasediments, and in the contact zone of intrusive granites in other older granites. The main occurrences of wolfram and tin are conditioned by structures inherited from early and late Variscan shears or fractures related to the installation of post-tectonic granites.

=== Local geology ===
Contact occurs between the greywacke schist complex of the Beiras group and the Variscan granite complex of northern Portugal. The Beiras group is formed by a dense series of thin lentils of marine origin, of clay and sandstone, which later underwent low-grade regional metamorphism (a facies of greenschist) during the initial compressive phases of the Variscan orogeny. The mines are located in the area of the greywacke schist complex in the ZCI. It is a region where metamorphosed sedimentary rock predominates, but where a large number of acidic and basic eruptive manifestations also occur. The age of the metasediments is attributed to the Cambrian or Upper Precambrian.

There are basic intrusive rocks identified as dolerites which occur as 0.5 to 3 m thick veins, mainly oriented north to south and vertically inclined. They are dark grey, fine grained and micro-porphyritic, being altered in contact with the mineral veins. They present irregular fractures and polyhedral disjunction. Mineralogically they essentially consist of labradorite, hornblende, chlorite and pyroxene which is amphibolitized. They do not affect mineralization and are intersected by the vein system. These dikes follow the two deformation phases. In the eastern zone of the mining concession there are mottled schists with spots of biotite and chlorite, and less frequently chiastolite and cordierite which correspond to a contact metamorphism halo, which is considered to indicate the presence of an intrusion of an in-depth magmatic body.

=== Ore ===
==== Formation ====
The sub-horizontal layout of the vein field was controlled either by pre-existing fracturing due to early deformation, or by the stress field associated with the granitic intrusion mechanism. The intruding granite heated and elevated the fluid pressure of nearby rocks, causing a network of radial fractures to open around the intrusive massif, allowing entry of granitic rocks into the fractures to form dikes and sills.

In the next phase, when the pressure of the ascending magma and the resistance of the host rock to intrusion are equal, there is a decrease in fluid pressure and consequently the future ore body is sheared and further fractured. The fluids turn the interior of the granite dome into greisen. Finally, the massif enters a solidification phase and, due to cooling, the topmost zone contracts. This is the situation at the mine, where the inclined radial structures are the precursors of the "galo" veins and the reopening of the sub-horizontal fractures gave rise to the veins. Therefore, it is considered that the vein procession may be an example of a vein field installed during the consolidation phase, in which, due to the cooling of the intrusive massif and dynamic propagation of fractures, sub-horizontal tensile cracks are generated and existing ones reopened.

==== Morphology of veins ====
The Panasqueira deposit consists of an extensive field of quartz veins, notable for its size and the abundance of mineral paragenesis. The wolfram-tin-copper mineralized zone consists of sub-horizontal quartz dikes (usually with an inclination of less than 25º, increasing to 30–40º near the greisen dome) that overlap and fill in fractures mainly developed in schist rocks, with an average depth of 25 cm (ranging from 1 to 150 cm) and a width that can reach 200 m, with an average of 48 m. The most important mineral in economical terms is wolfram (wolframite); tin (cassiterite) and copper (chalcopyrite) are mining by-products.

In addition to these minerals, there is a great variety of other minerals such as: muscovite, topaz, fluorite, arsenopyrite, pyrite, pyrrhotite, marcasite, sphalerite, apatite, siderite, calcite and dolomite.

There is also a very typical morphology in these veins called rabo de enguia (English: 'eel's tail'). This morphology consists of pressure-induced throttling, often resulting in the precipitation of wolframite and cassiterite at the ends. They regularly display a structure that suggests different filling phases related to reopening events.

The veins with the greatest inclination (30º to 40º), found in the vicinity of the greisen dome, are called "galo" veins. Usually these types of veins are also well mineralized. They sometimes show variable deviations of 1 to 5 m, and after dipping return to the horizontal. A different and relatively frequent structure in both the mine and the surrounding area are quartz structures called seixo bravo (English: 'wild pebbles'). This connotation is mainly due to their hardness and the fact that they do not contain useful minerals. These are lenticular, irregular veins, with a sub-vertical inclination whose arrangement is consistent with the main schistosity and can easily reach 3 m in width. It is a quartz of exudation, sterile, and a product of the segregation and recrystallization of quartz by regional metamorphism. They are prior to mineralized veins and often form 90º angles.

==== Mineral associations ====
Establishing a deposition sequence for the minerals from the mine is quite difficult due to the existence of different stages of formation and the fact that some of them only appear in certain areas of the mining concession, making their correlation very difficult. However, Kelly & Rye (1979) defined four stages of deposition for the mineralogy of the veins:

1. Oxide and silicate formation stage: the most significant stage from an economical point of view, since wolframite and cassiterite form. In this stage most of the quartz and muscovite, as well as tourmaline, topaz and a large part of arsenopyrite, are formed in at least two generations.
2. Major sulfide formation stage: the predominant minerals are sulfides, especially pyrite, chalcopyrite, sphalerite, stannite and pyrrhotite and, to a lesser extent, galena. New generations of arsenopyrite, already in a third generation, can be found, as well as muscovite and quartz. The final phase of this stage essentially corresponds to the end of apatite deposition.
3. Pyrrhotite alteration stage: fundamentally characterized by the alteration of pyrrhotite, which results in marcasite and mainly siderite, due to the iron released in the alteration process. Added to this iron is the iron released in the dissolution of pyrite-I giving rise to a second generation of pyrite, magnetite and hematite. In this phase, there is also an alteration of stannite by reaction with siderite, forming covellite, chalcopyrite and cassiterite. It is also at this stage that the silver salts usually associated with bismuthinite and accompanied by sphalerite or chalcopyrite are deposited.
4. Late carbonate formation stage: characterized by the formation of carbonates, mainly calcite and dolomite, the latter in mixed crystals, i.e. with a core of siderite as well as fluorite. It is in this stage that chlorite is formed. Later generations of sulfides are also observed, but always in small amounts.

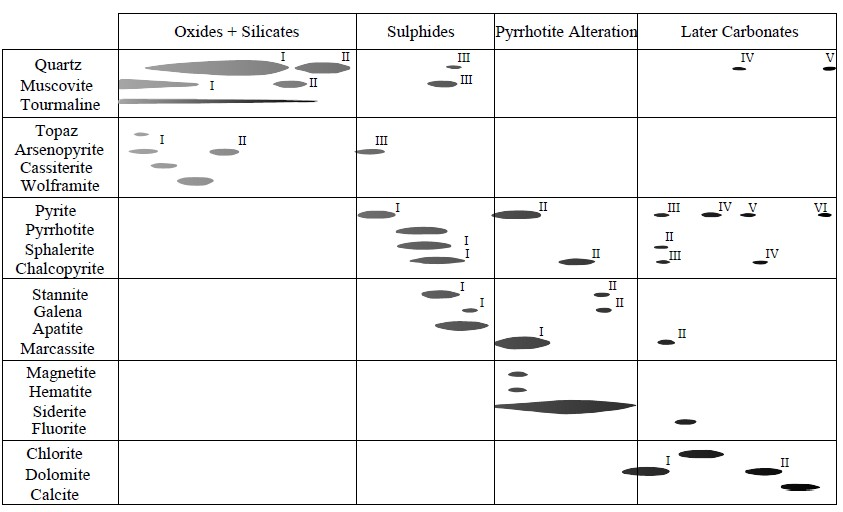
Panasqueira paragenesis phases

==== Faults ====
From a structural point of view, the mine region is characterized by the occurrence of a large number of faults and fractures, locally well marked, both in the type of filling they have and in their orientation. There are two major fault systems: those belonging to the north–south system and those belonging to the NE-SW to ENE-WSW system. To the first belong the main, 3W, 1W, Fonte da Lameiras, and Vale das Freiras faults; the Cebola and 8E faults belong to the second. It is thought that the latter were initiated with strike-slip movements during the Variscan orogeny and reactivated during the Alpine orogeny. It is a complex of faults in the left shear zone, which affects the Ordovician formations of the Serra do Vidual in the southwest, and joins with the Manteigas–Unhais da Serra fault in the northeast. There are no recognized outcrops of mineralized veins north-northwest of this accident, neither of wolframite nor cassiterite.

=== Resources and reserves ===
Measured and indicated resources (September 2016)
	Proven reserves (pillars)			Probable reserves (virgin area)			Total reserves		
Level	Thousand tons	% WO_{3}	Thousand MTUs	Thousand tons	% WO_{3}	Thousand MTUs	Thousand tons	% WO_{3}	Thousand MTUs
0	51	0.18	9	1,038	0.23	236	1,089	0.22	245
1	706	0.20	139	1,314	0.21	272	2,020	0.20	411
2	468	0.20	92	2,984	0.24	726	3,452	0.24	818
3	727	0.21	153	2,396	0.25	616	3,123	0.24	763
4				343	0.22	76	343	0.22	76
Total	1,951	0.20	393	8,076	0.24	1,920	10,027	0.23	2,313

Historical comparison between the several types of resources
	Measured resources		Indicated resources		Inferred resources	
Date	Million tons	% WO_{3}	Million tons	% WO_{3}	Million tons	% WO_{3}
January 2011	1.25	0.25	10.93	0.23	6.07	0.22
July 2011	1.29	0.24	10.93	0.23	6.03	0.22
January 2012	1.2	0.24	11.05	0.23	6.04	0.22
July 2012	1.22	0.23	10.82	0.23	5.96	0.22
January 2013	1.23	0.22	9.68	0.23	5.92	0.22
July 2013	1.26	0.21	9.43	0.23	5.88	0.22
January 2014	1.28	0.21	8.48	0.24	5.03	0.22
July 2014	1.57	0.20	8.14	0.24	5.01	0.22
January 2015	1.54	0.20	7.94	0.23	4.93	0.22
July 2015	1.66	0.21	7.88	0.24	4.91	0.22
September 2016	1.95	0.20	8.08	0.24	5.16	0.22

Summary of existing resources (2016 September)
	Proven reserves (pillars)		Probable reserves (virgin area)		Total reserves	
Level	Thousand tons	% WO_{3}	Thousand tons	% WO_{3}	Thousand tons	% WO_{3}
0	25	0.19	26	0.17	51	0.18
1	238	0.22	468	0.18	706	0.20
2	216	0.21	251	0.19	468	0.20
3	297	0.24	431	0.19	727	0.21
Total	775	0.22	1,176	0.19	1,951	0.20

== Organization of mining infrastructure ==
Mining at Panasqueira has always been done by underground methods, with the exception of a small mixed method tin mine (glory hole) in Vale de Ermida in the 1950s. The mine galleries are horizontal and since the joining of the two main historical mining areas (Panasqueira and Barroca Grande) with the main gallery of Barroca Grande; it was renamed level 0. Later level 1 was traced and then levels 2 and 3. The spacing between these levels is 60 m as previously the opening systems for chimneys (raises) were complex and dangerous. With the acquisition in 1974 of a raise borer, the spacing between levels (level 3) increased to 90 m. There is a mine drainage level (level 530), 30 m below level 2 where historically ore was also extracted. All mine drainage exits through this gallery. Water from higher levels flows by gravity, while water below the drainage level is sent to a pumping station installed below level 3. Horizontally, the galleries of the various levels form a grid in which the north–south galleries are called panels and the east–west galleries are called drives.

Extraction of ore to the surface was done by tunnels above level 0 and then through several vertical shafts. With the relocation of the production zones to the southwest of the washing plant, in order to reduce the operational complexity of the various extraction shafts, increase capacity and centralize extraction by modern means closer to the new centre of the mining area, an underground crushing chamber was installed at 530 m elevation. A 17º incline conveyor belt transports the crushed ore to several surface storage pits that feed the washing plant and allow the necessary flexibility between the mine and the plant. This system, which began operation in 1981 is still in use today. For ore extraction below level 2 (level 3) a vertical shaft was installed in 1996, which brings the ore up to level 2 (at 560 m elevation).

== Mining methods ==
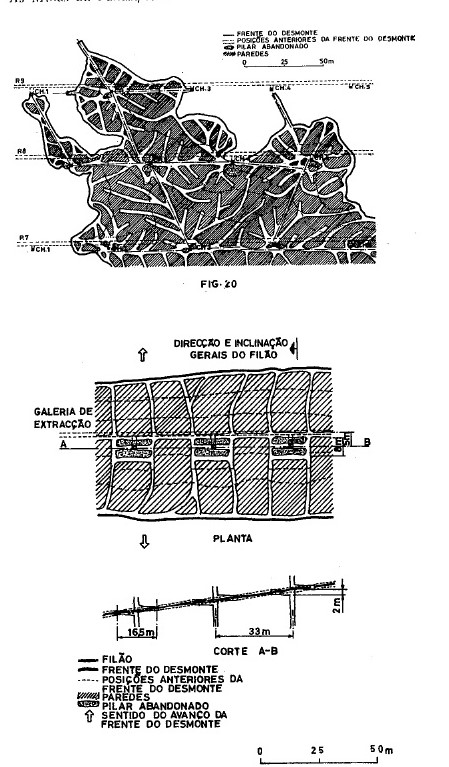
Longwall method in Panasqueira

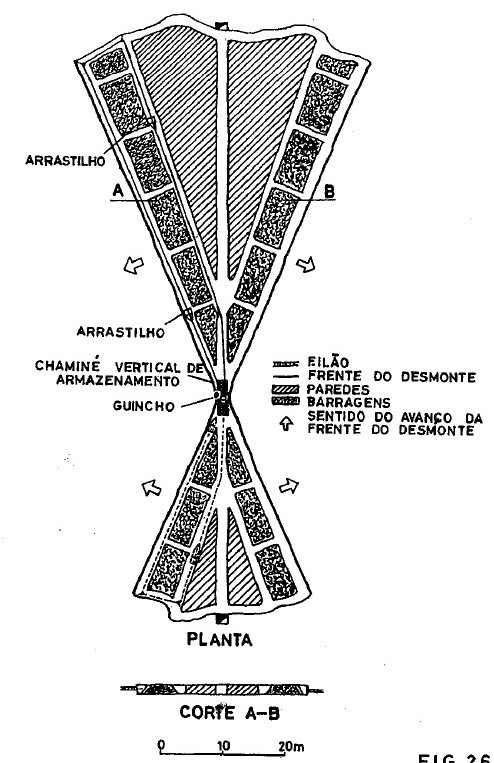
Converging faces method in Panasqueira

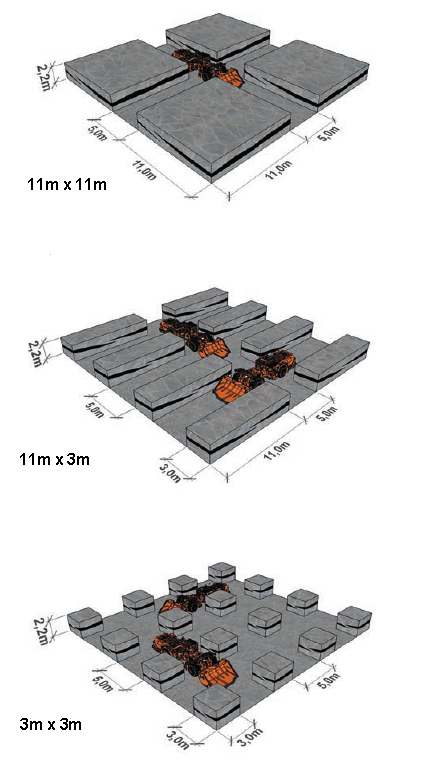
Room and pillar ore extraction sequence

The ore is extracted in stopes by drilling and blasting with explosives, and loaded by LHDs into storage and extraction bins which are regularly arranged and fill 4 ton minecarts. The minecarts circulate between levels 2 and 3, dumping the ore into the crushing chamber on level 2. The minecarts are pulled by battery or diesel locomotives. The large size of the vein field and the fact that Panasqueira's veins are very homogeneous throughout the mineralized zone allowed the systematization and mechanization of mining from the beginning. This was essential for the survival of the mine in a sector that has experienced notable difficulties in recent decades due to changing mining industry patterns in the European Union.

The stoping methods used in the mine have varied over time:

=== Longwall ===
During the 1950s the longwall method was widespread throughout the mine. Depending on the inclination of the veins, parallel fronts (for sub-horizontal veins) or irregular fronts, also known in the mine as modas e bordados (English: 'fashions and embroidery'; for veins with an inclination between 7º and 12º), were used. Within the stope, manually filled wooden minecarts circulated that transported the disassembled ore to the pits where it dropped by gravity to the lower rolling level. Mechanical drilling was done with jackhammers and the start-up was done, as today, with explosives. When filling the minecarts the overburden was chosen to remain as a wall that accompanied the progress of the excavation, forming the structure responsible for supporting the cavity. This method had several drawbacks such as a high labour demand and the loss of a large part of the finer fraction of the ore when it was violently projected against the stone walls. The method evolved in order to find solutions for the loss of this finer and consequently more mineralized fraction.

=== Longwalls with converging faces ===
The year 1958 marked a fundamental evolution in the longwall mining method, due to a lack of manpower caused by immigration. Mechanization was necessary with the adaptation of haulers or scrapers that had high capacity, versatility and range. For the use of scrapers the stopes were adapted into a system of faces converging at the storage and extraction chimney. This variant that in the mine was known as bacalhau ('cod') was doubled. This was the system used throughout most of the 1960s and that resulted in a 40% increase in productivity compared to the initial longwall method.

=== Room and pillar: initial phase ===
The construction of walls to support the ceiling was a completely manual job and consumed about 60% of the labour used in stoping. The importance of investigating another support system that would at the same time allow greater mechanization of the remaining stoping operations resulted in the transition to the room and pillar method. The pillars were successively reduced in size, and for the final phase of stoping two support methods were tested: reinforced concrete columns formed by overlapping tiles, and piles of wood stacked in various ways. The concrete columns were abandoned almost immediately due to their cost and lack of elasticity that led to sudden breaks. The wooden piles gave better results and were implemented first in combination with stone walls and then alone.

=== Room and pillar: later method ===
The room and pillar method allowed an increasing mechanization of the stoping operations that led to the use of drilling machines, first with compressed air and then with electro-hydraulic systems. It also allowed the use of loaders, first compressed air, then electrical and currently diesel. The cost of labour and materials associated with using wood piles for total ore recovery is the reason why residual pillars containing 16% of the ore are left behind, leading to a deposit recovery of 84%.

Currently all stope work is mechanized and the stoping sequence proceeds in five phases:

1. Recognition galleries are opened along the vein (inclines) to confirm the real value of a vein or zone of the vein as well as its exact geometry (measured resources). In this phase the infrastructure such as electrical supply, compressed air, and ventilation are set up.
2. Exploration galleries are opened in a grid pattern, leaving 11 by 11 m columns between them. This is done until the full definition of the exploitable zones of a given vein is determined.
3. At the end of the 2nd Phase and when the veins above have already been mined, the 11 by 11 m pillars are cut in half by galleries, which are always 5 m wide, resulting in 11 by 3 m rectangular pillars.
4. The rectangular pillars are cut in half by new galleries, leaving 3 by 3 m residual pillars.
5. The 3 by 3 m pillars are unstable in the long term, but they allow for a 6-month period in which it is possible to work safely in the last phase of stoping, which is the extraction by small excavators of the finer material that accumulates on the floor (threshold) and has an appreciable amount of wolfram due to the friability of wolframite. This phase is monitored with a visual assessment of the pillars and measurement of roof-floor convergences to verify the safety conditions within the stope. Once the clean-up work is complete, the stope is abandoned and access is prohibited.

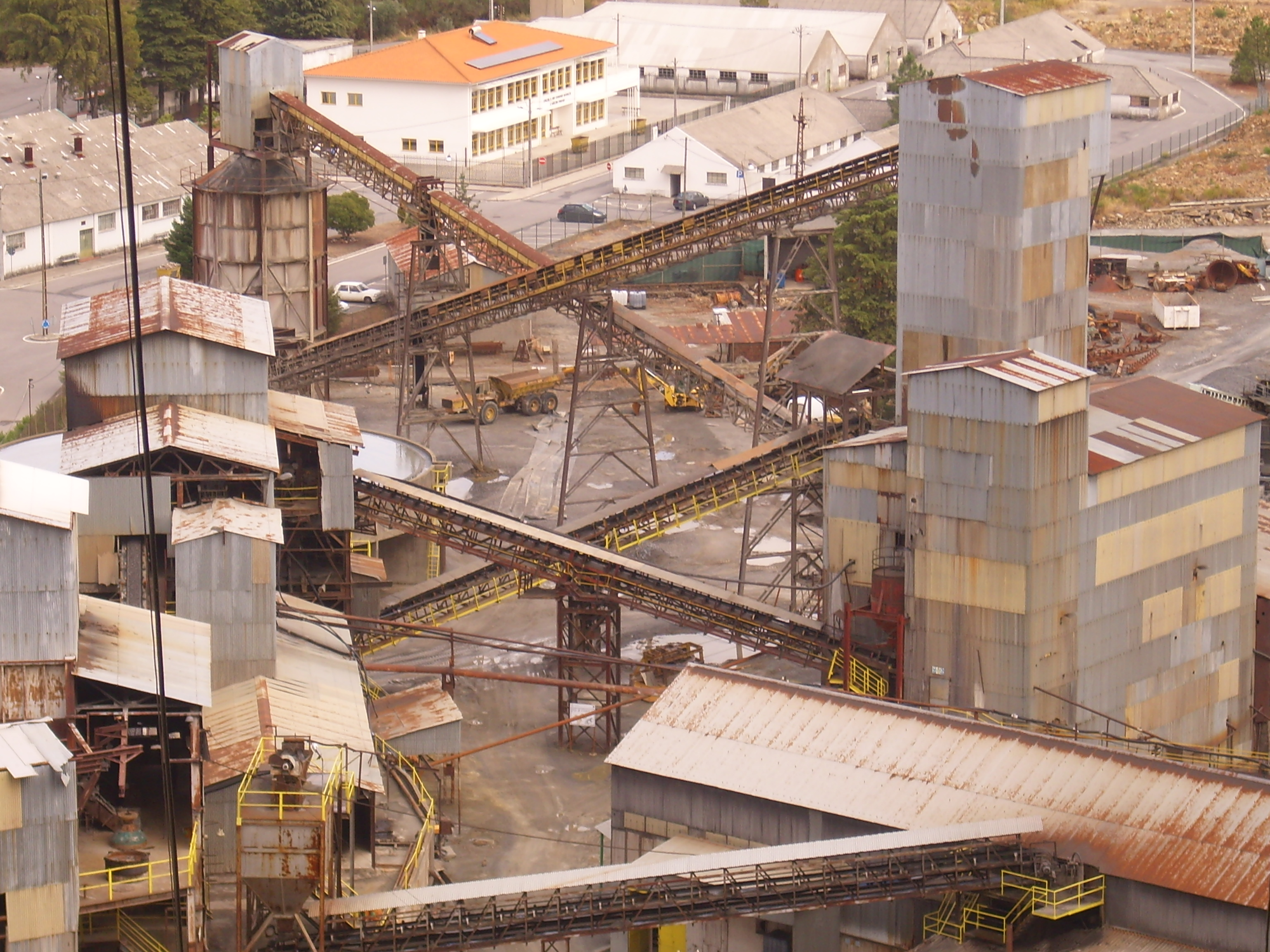
Processing plant at Barroca Grande

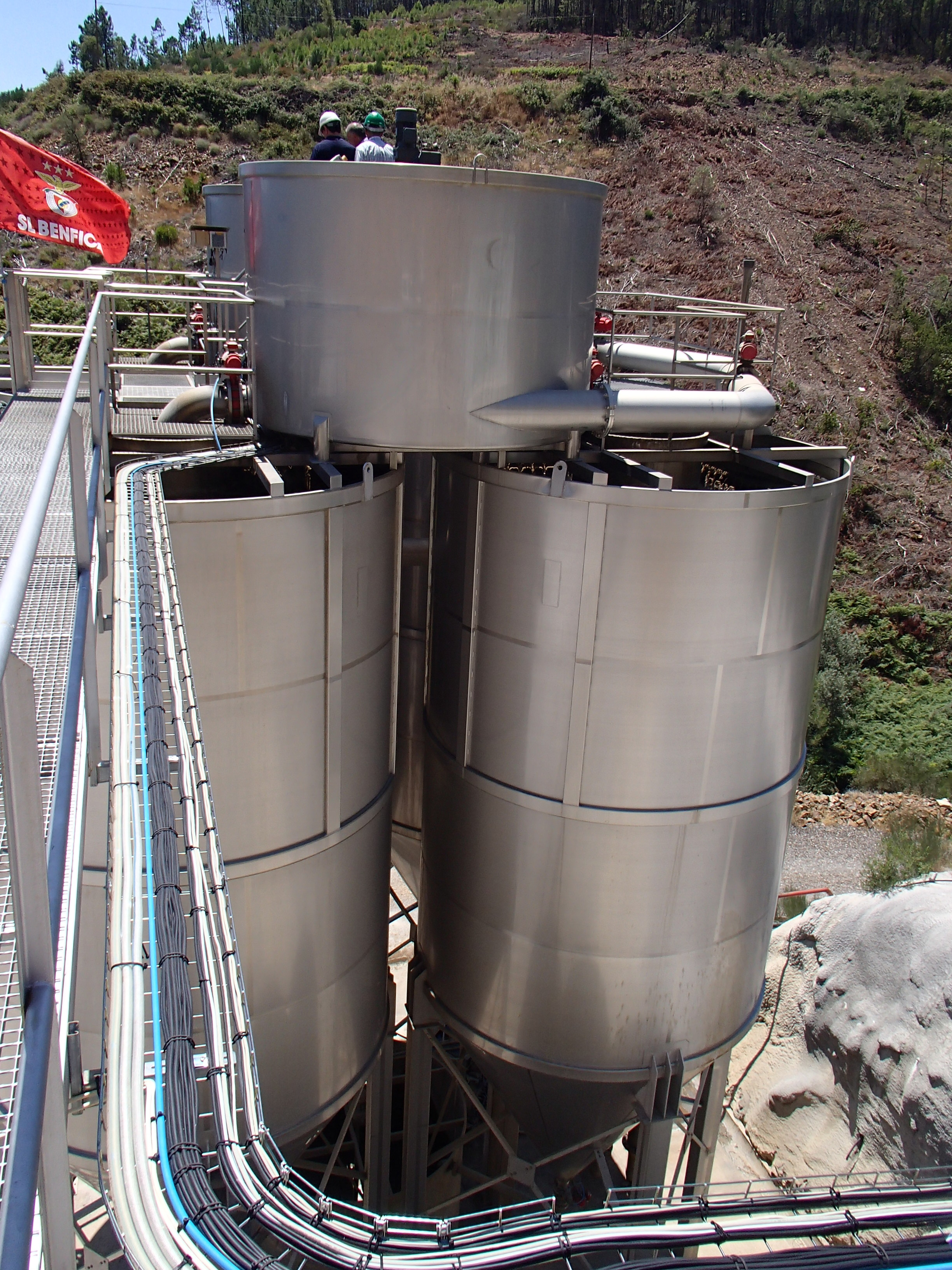
Mine waste water treatment plant

== Ore processing ==
For decades there were three independent processing plants which later complemented each other, Panasqueira, Cabeço do Pião and Barroca Grande. Panasqueira Plant began to be built in the 19th century and was progressively transferred, from 1928, to Barroca Grande which has a more central location, more available area, greater access to water and other advantages that led to the Panasqueira plant being completely deactivated in the 1960s. The Cabeço do Pião plant, like the one at Panasqueira, began to be built at the end of the 19th century. With the abandonment of this vein exploitation zone, and due to the greater availability of water from the Zêzere River, this plant only treated the pre-concentrates that came first by aerial cable and later by truck from the Barroca Grande plant. At the end of the 1980s, the Panasqueira mine was large enough that its drainage water was sufficient to supply the necessary flow to the entire industrial structure; thus between 1992 and 1996, in order to rationalize costs and due to environmental reasons all ore concentration operations were centralized at the Barroca Grande plant.

The ore enrichment process has evolved greatly over time. In the beginning it started in the stopes with manual selection of the ore, reaching the plant with an enrichment of approximately 6 times in relation to the rock with which it was stoped. This manual sorting operation was difficult to carry out in the stopes, so a rougher sorting was done in the stopes, with the finer sorting being done in the Barroca Grande plant on ore that had already been washed and screened, and in good lighting conditions. The pre-concentration continued by jigging and the pre-concentrate then went to the Cabeço do Pião plant.

With the increase in stope height due to increasing mechanization from the 1960s to the 1990s, more waste was produced for the same amount of ore, resulting in higher amounts of low grade ore reaching the plant. It was necessary to replace the pre-concentration done by manual sorting and jigging with a more efficient method and one with a greater capacity to deal with the greater volume of waste rock that reached the plant. In 1971 a dense media (HMS) was installed for this purpose, which performs pre-concentration very effectively and with minimal losses. Due to improvement in the mine stoping method and the greater need for fragmentation for the dense media, a fine ore recovery circuit was installed in the 1960s which was improved and expanded in the 1980s.

Currently, the ore leaves the stope with a grade of approximately 0.15% WO_{3}. Its concentration in the first stages is completely hydrogravitic. For this purpose, advantage is taken of the fact that the minerals to be used (wolframite, cassiterite and chalcopyrite) are dense, and in the case of Panasqueira of very heavy mineralization. After secondary crushing to 20 mm the ore is enriched through dense media and shaking tables until a pre-concentrate with approximately 6% WO_{3} is obtained. This pre-concentrate is then concentrated to levels close to those of the final concentrate on flotation tables, for the simultaneous enrichment of dense particles and separation of sulfides, which are then floated to obtain a final copper concentrate (chalcopyrite). The dense pre-concentrate is then separated on tables and by electromagnetic separation into wolfram (wolframite) and tin (cassiterite) concentrates.

== Environmental installations ==
Drainage water from the mine is conducted to the surface through the Salgueira gallery. The water has a pH of around 4 and contains heavy metals above the emission limit values. In the 1950s a wastewater treatment plant was installed, which, by alkalinization via the addition of lime, treats the water until heavy metals are precipitated into sludge which is then stored in the tailings dams. The treated water is pumped for use as industrial water in both the processing plant and the mine. Since the 1950s, the mine has expanded and the effluent flow has increased proportionally. In 2011 the water treatment plant was expanded and improved to treat all the water coming from the mine, the plant and runoff from the tailings. The non-reusable effluent resulting from the process is dumped into the Bodelhão stream, complying with the monitoring program defined in the Environmental License, with monthly reporting to the relevant authorities. The plant almost completely reuses the water it uses due to the use of several decanters installed for this purpose. The sludge resulting from water treatment, as well as the finer fraction of tailings from the plant, are stored together in tailings dams. Any effluent from these dams is redirected to the water treatment plant. Tailings in the form of sand and gravel are sold as construction aggregate. The part that is not sold serves as a barrier for the tailings dams.

== Gallery ==
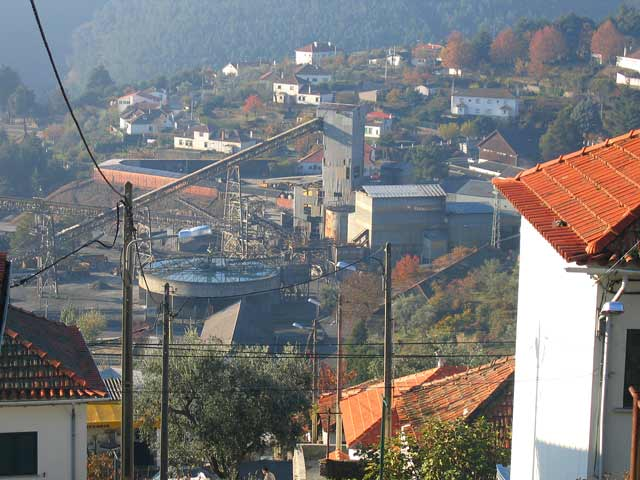
Panasqueira mine

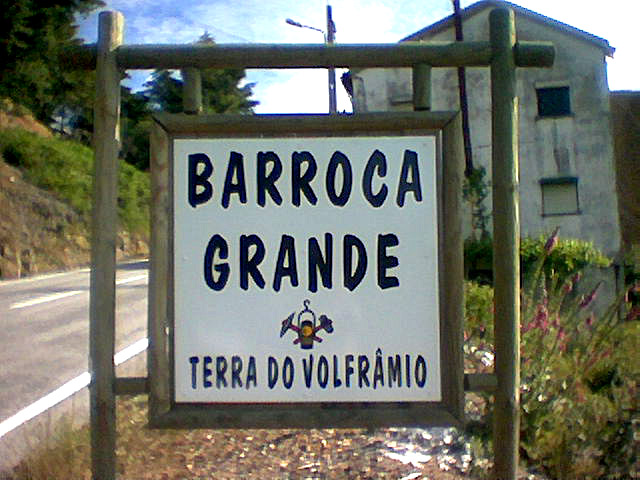
Panasqueira mine - Barroca Grande

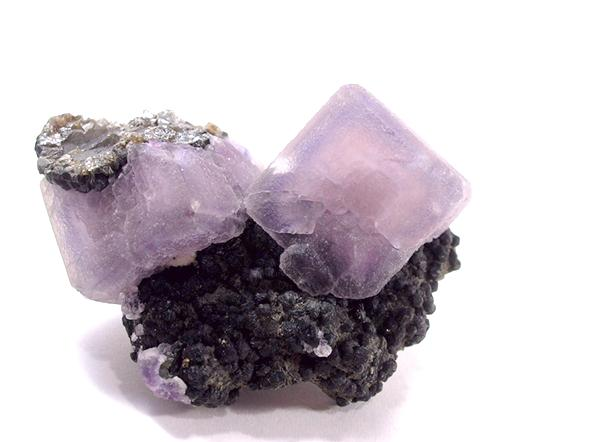
Fluorite on Chalcopyrite, (5.2 x 4.6 x 2.6 cm)

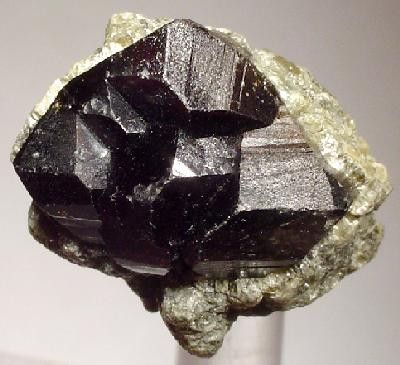
Cassiterite crystals (2.2 x 1.9 x 1.8 cm)
