= Sangdong mine =

Tungsten mine in Yeongwol County, Gangwon Province, South Korea

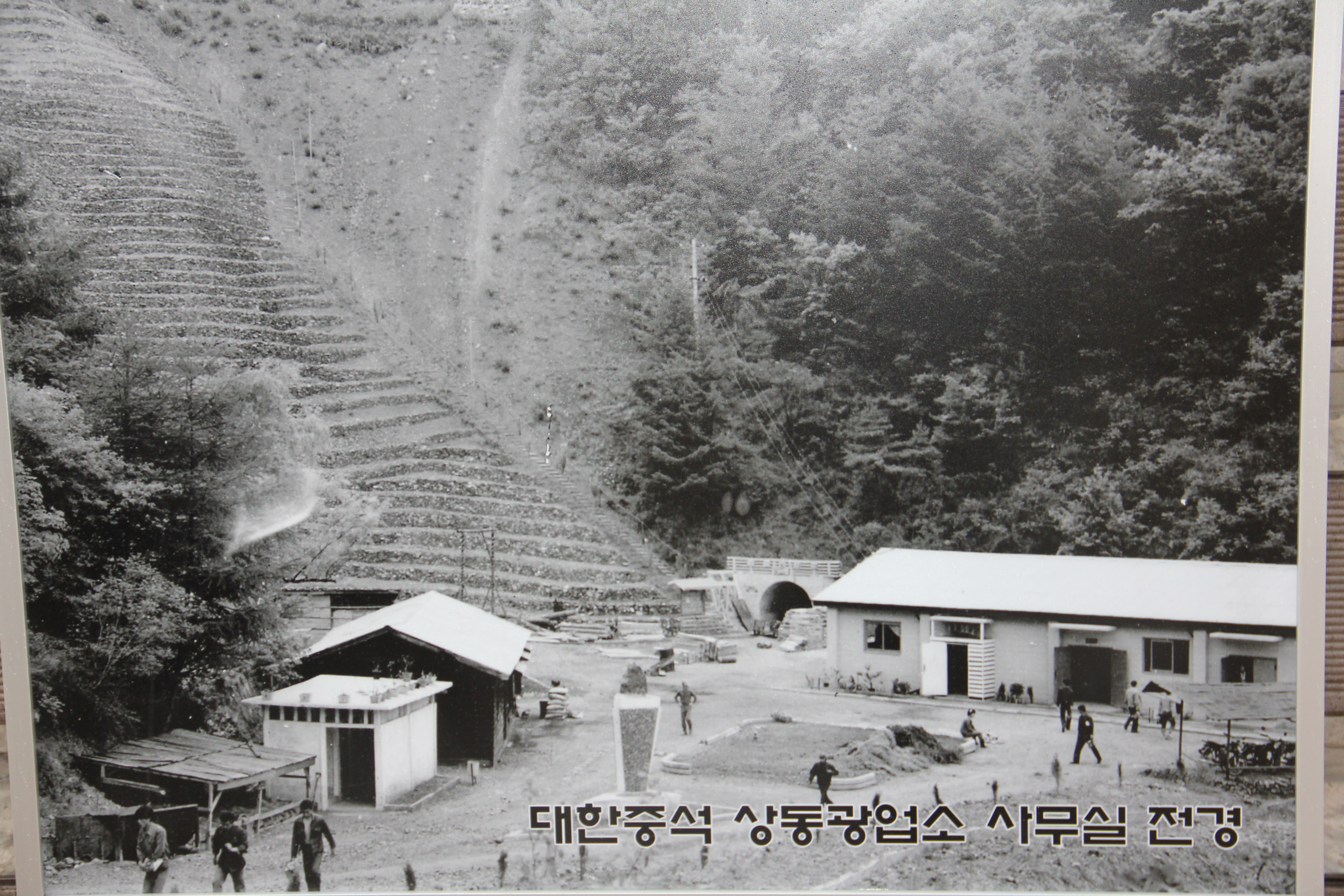
- Site area KTMC period (Old adit of Taebaek Level, 684m)
- Interactive map of Sangdong mine
- Location: Yeongwol County, Gangwon Province, South Korea; 37°9′N 128°50′E
- Products: Tungsten
- Type: Open-stope
- Discovered: 1916
- Active: 1930–1994, and 2024–present
- Company: Almonty Korea Tungsten
- Website: www.almontykorea.co.kr
- Acquired: 2001

The Sangdong mine located in South Korea is one of the largest tungsten mines in the world.

Sangdong Mine was a main business station for tungsten concentrate production of Korea Tungsten Mining Co. (KTMC). The scale and quality of Sangdong tungsten and molybdenum production) drove South Korean economic development after the Korean War.

A decade after the closure of the KTMC in 1994, mining rights to the Sangdong mine were acquired by Woulfe Mining Corporation through Sewoo Mining Corporation in 2006. In 2015, Almonty Industries acquired Woulfe Mining Corporation and established Almonty Korea Tungsten Corporation (formerly Sangdong Mining Corporation), which operates as a subsidiary of Almonty Industries.

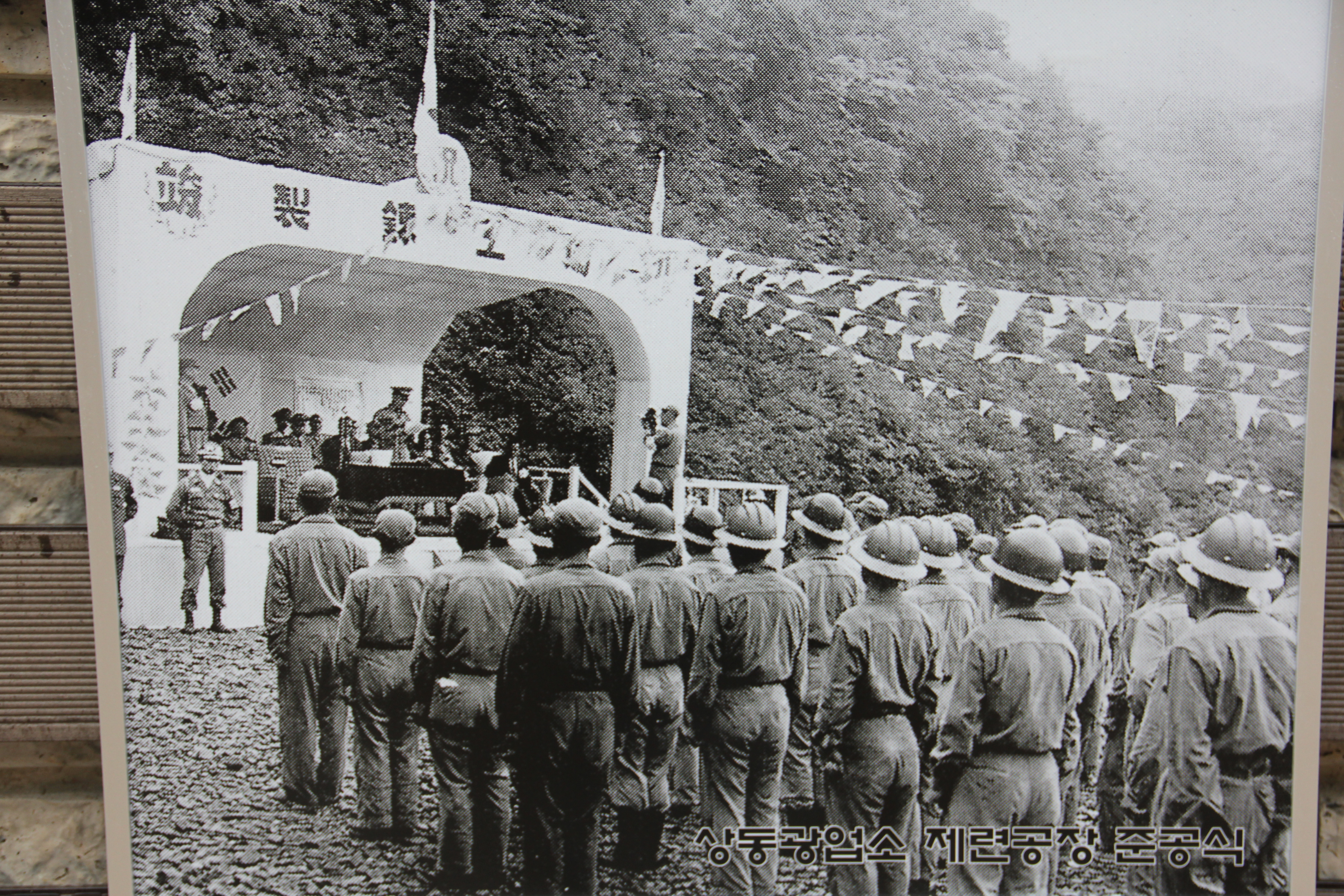
Holding ceremony for completion KTMC APT Plant

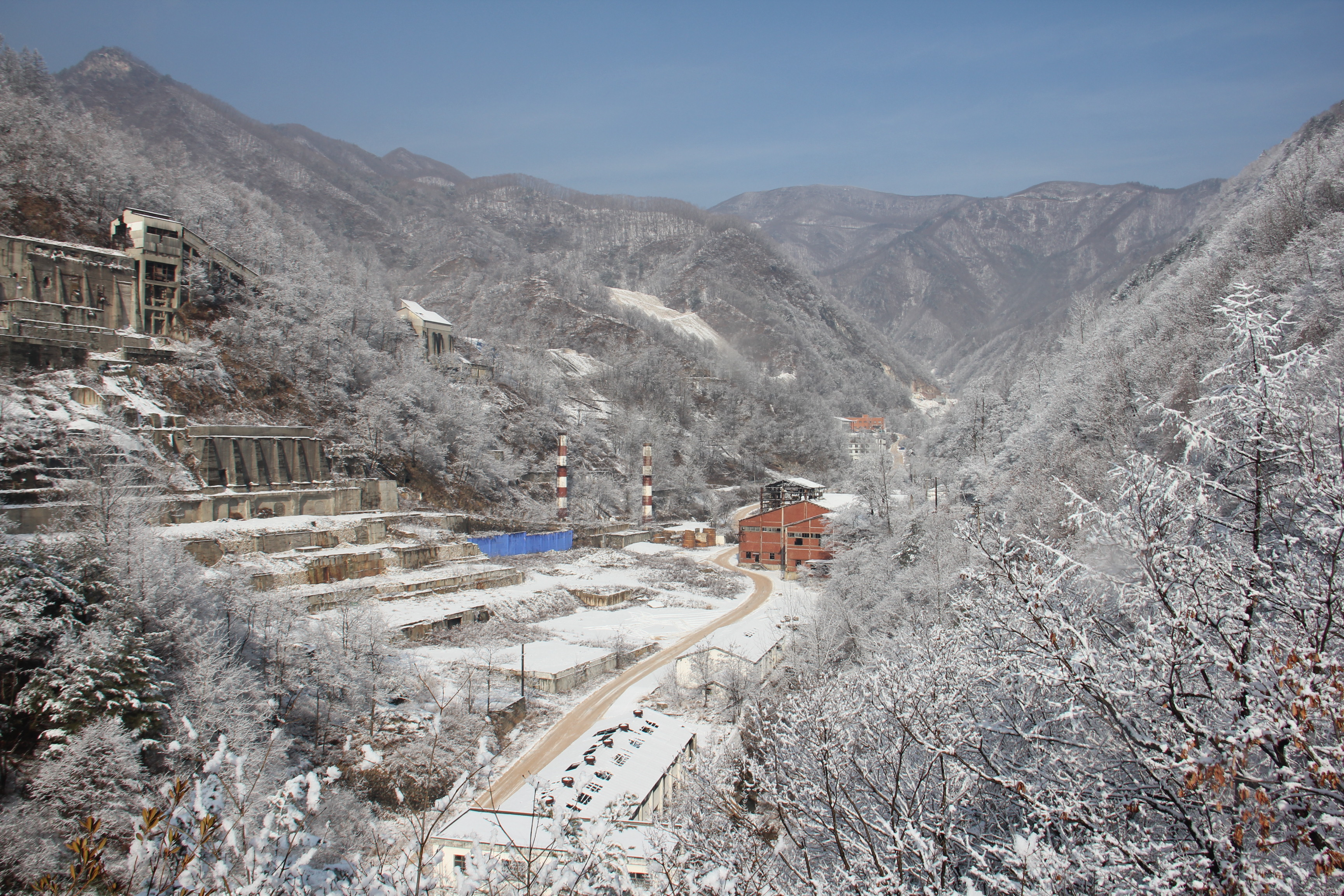
Entrance to sangdong mine in winter season

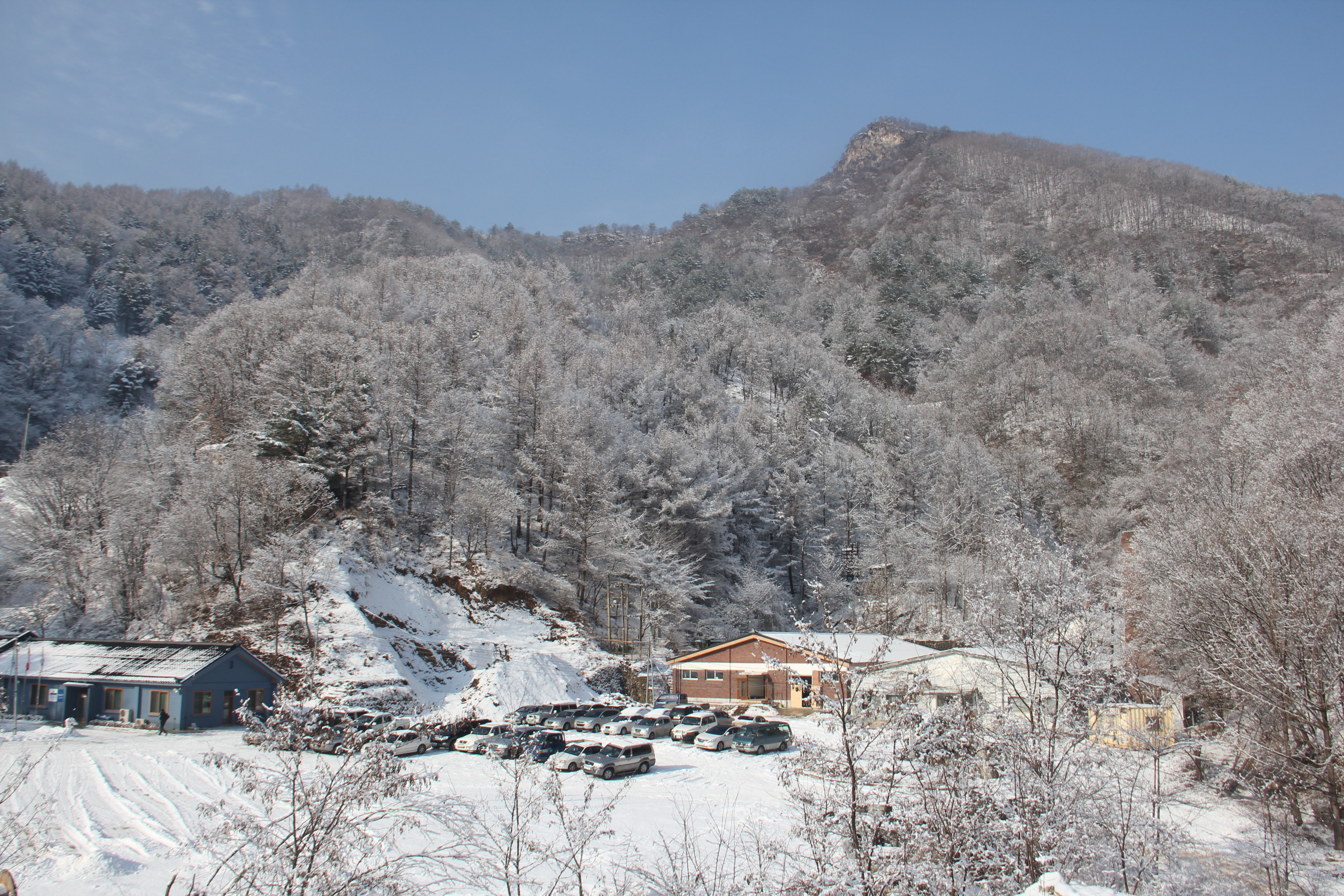
Main Office of Sangdong mine

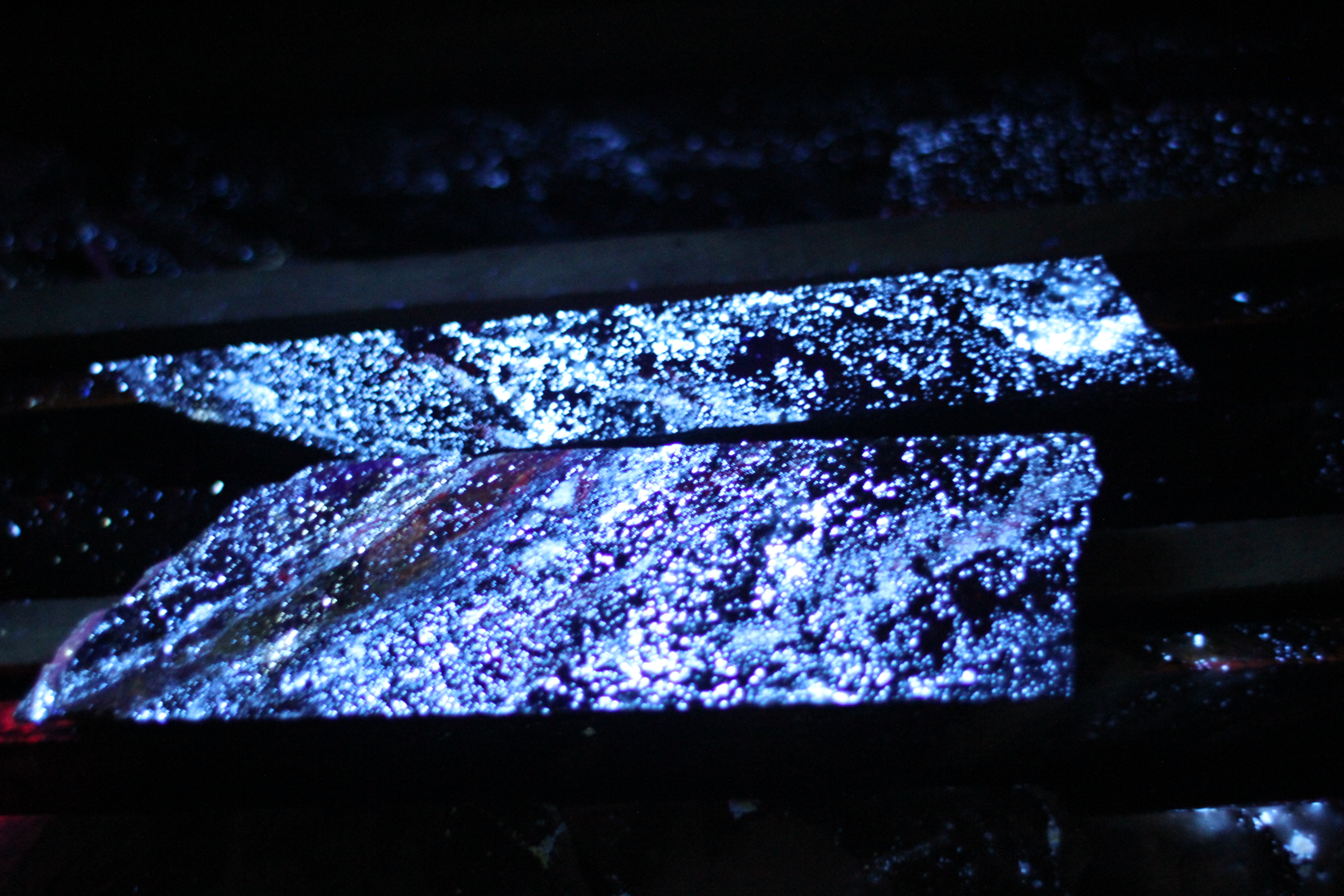
Scheelite ore of sangdong mine

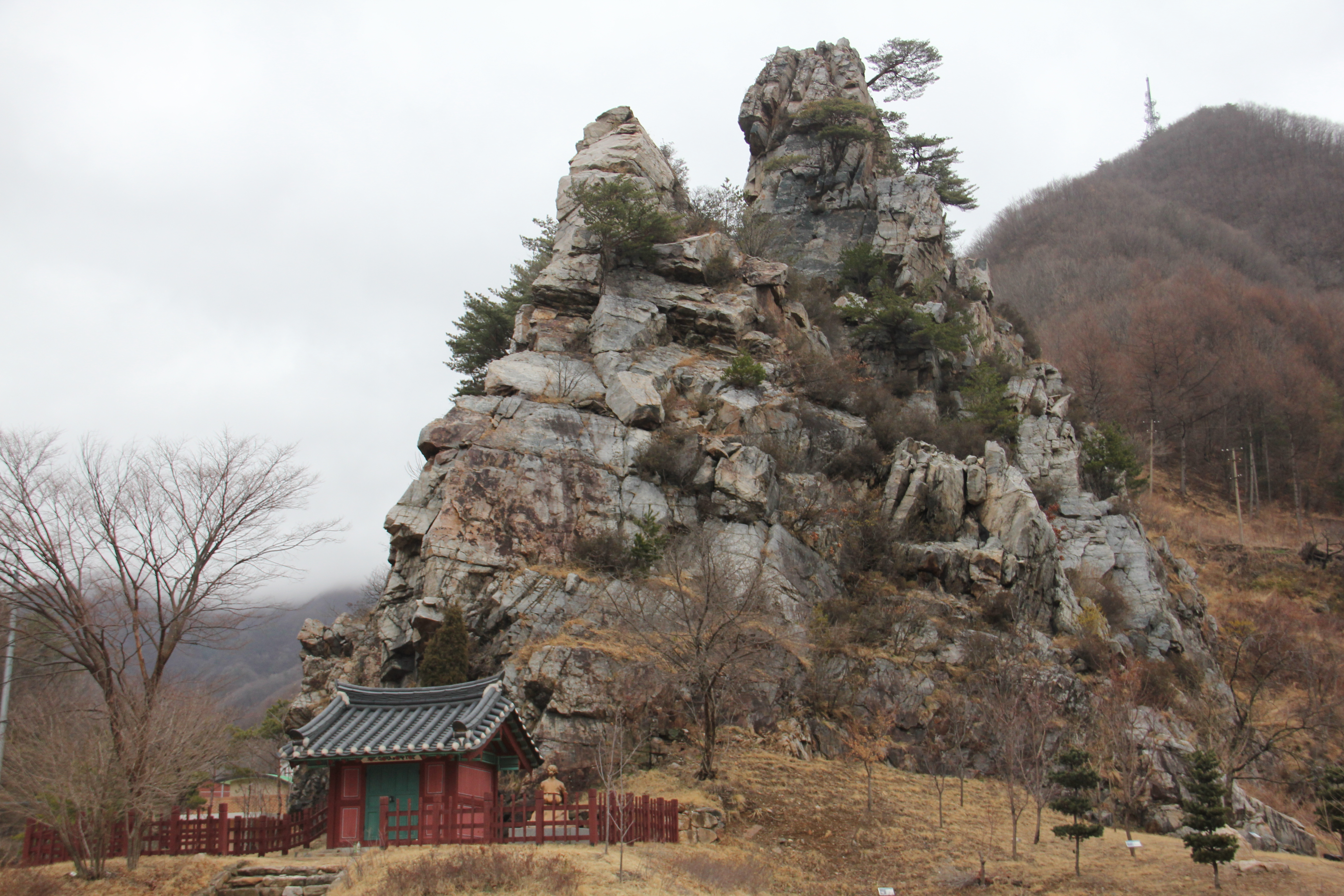
Spiritual Rock in Sangdong Town

== History ==
In 1916, tungsten was discovered in Sangdong. In the 1960s, the Sangdong mine accounted for 70% of South Korea's export earnings. In 1994, the mine closed amidst cheaper supplies from China. The mine was relaunched in 2026 amidst concerns overreliance on China.

=== 1916–1994 ===
Apr.	1916	Discover outcrop of Sangdong mine by Mr Sunwon Hwang.
	1930	Application of “Sublevel Stopping” mining method.
Feb.	1934	Acquisition by Japanese Solim Mining Corporation.
Oct.	1946	Company name changed from Solim Tungsten Mining Company to Joseon Tungsten Mining Company.
Jan.	1947	Statement “Korean tungsten quality is the standard in global market” announced by USA national assay office.
Feb.	1947	Sangdong tungsten scheelite was exported to the US for the first time.
Apr.	1947	Statement “Sangdong Mine, producing monthly 100M/T of high quality tungsten concentrate with over 60% grade” announced by Minister Archer L. Lerch of USA military government.
Oct.	1949	Company name changed from Joseon Tungsten Mining Company to Korea Tungsten Mining Company.
Mar.	1952	Korea-USA Tungsten Trade Agreement.
Sep	1952	Official launching of Korea Tungsten Mining Co., Ltd.
Mar.	1954	Expiration of “Korea-USA Tungsten Agreement” and no extension due to a tungsten glut and price decline in the market.
Jun.	1956	Tunneling of the 1st Incline from Sangdong gallery
May.	1959	Completion of chemical processing plant construction
Jun.	1959	Mining footwall of Sangdong gallery / Ventilation tunneling of Taebaek gallery.
Dec.	1960	Completion of industrial water piping work from village (Chilyangee) stream.
Sep.	1961	Construction of Metal Bismuth smelting factory.
Feb.	1962	Completion of concentrate storage construction.
Sep.	1963	Install 100HP pump and pump room for flooding prevention on Level – 6.
Feb.	1965	Production of Metal Bismuth.
Aug.	1965	Tunneling of Baekun haulage gallery.
Dec.	1965	Tunneling of Taebaek gallery
Apr.	1966	Beginning of sand filling construction test (Apr.~Dec.)
May.	1966	Verification of Top Slicing mine method and adoption
Sep.	1967	Vertical shaft construction groundbreaking
Oct.	1968	Tunneling of Level 11
Dec.	1969	Beginning of re-mining from Level 1 and 10 / Tunneling of Level 12
May.	1970	Tunneling of Cross on Level 10
Aug.	1970	Construction of the 2nd processing plant (70ton/day)
Sep.	1970	Sangdong Mine flood damage by localized torrential downpour
Dec.	1970	Re-mining from Level 2 and 3 / Chute installation on Level 6,7,8,9,10
May.	1971	Chute installation from Sangdong gallery to Baekgun gallery
Dec.	1971	Tunneling of Sangdong inclined ventilation gallery
Oct.	1972	Replacement of wooden support by concrete support in gallery.
Dec.	1972	APT plant completion (3ton/day)
Apr.	1973	Closing of the 3rd Incline.
May.	1973	Beginning of the 1st tailing dam construction
Aug.	1975	Tunneling of Cross on Level 16
Feb.	1978	Tunneling of Cross on Level 15
Jul.	1979	The 1st tailing dam flood damage by localized torrential downpour
Nov.	1979	Re-mining from Jangsan gallery
Apr.	1980	Apply “Large hole burn cut method” as Sangdong blasting process.
Aug.	1982	Completion of the 2nd tailing storage
Feb.	1992	Company name changed from “Korea Tungsten Mining Corporation” to Korea Tungsten Corporation".
Feb.	1994	Sangdong Mine closed

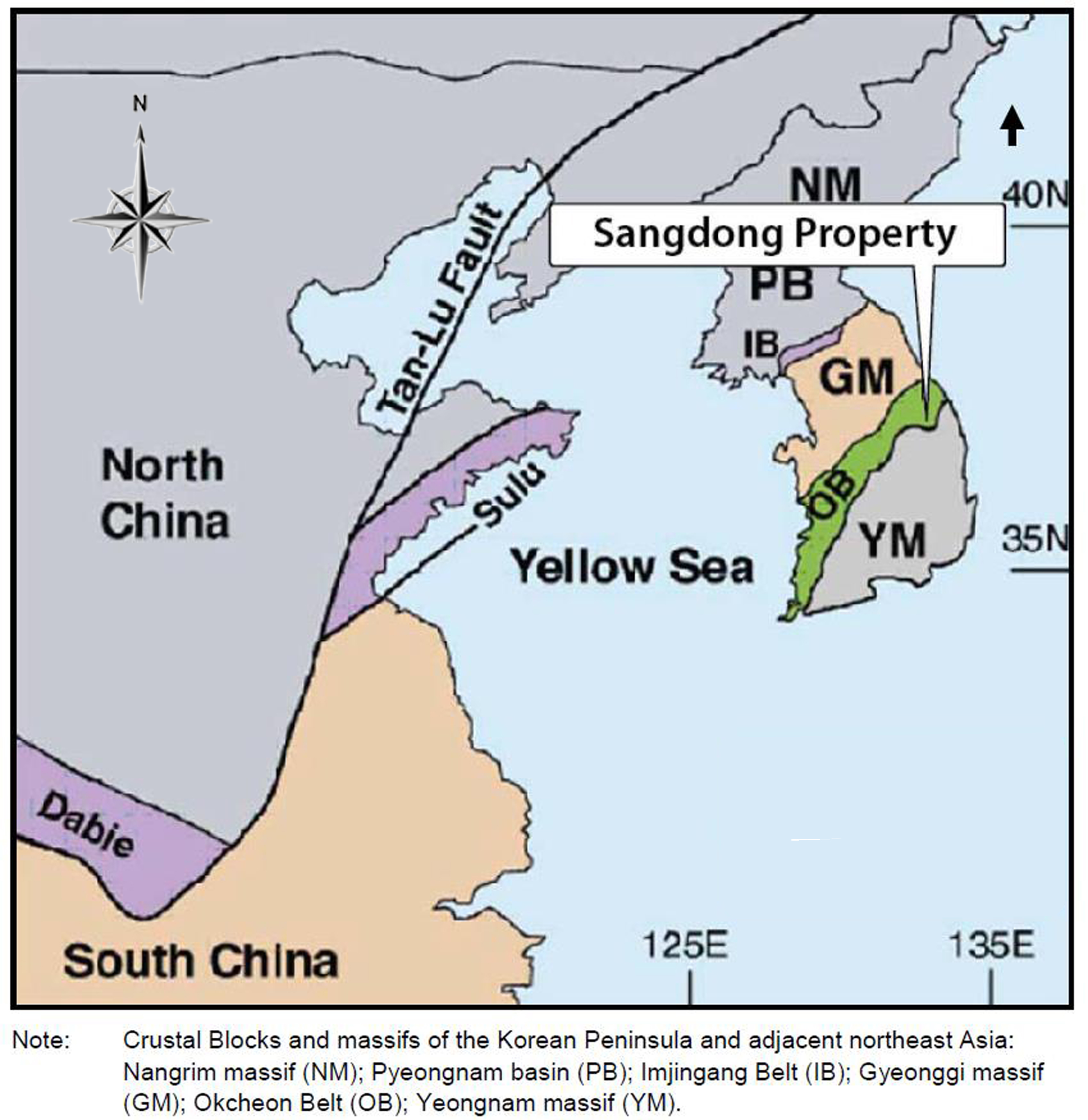
Regional geology map of Korean Peninsula

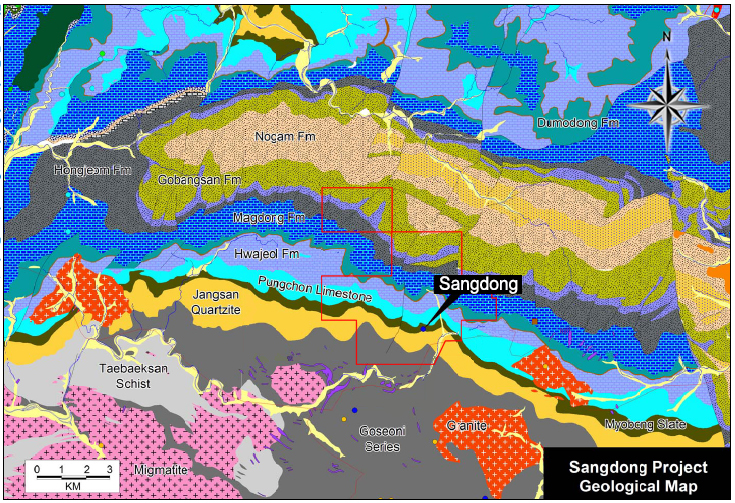
Project Geological map

=== 2001–2015 ===
Jun.	2001	Sangdong mining concession registered by Sewoo Mining Corp.
Jan.	2007	Sangdong mining concession transferred to Orient Hard Metals Holdings Korea Corp.
Mar.	2010	Company name “Orient Hard Metals Holdings Korea Corp.” changed to Sangdong Mining Corp.
Sep.	2015	Woulfe Mining Corp. (100% parent company of Sangdong Mining Corp.) acquired by Almonty Industries Inc.

== Geology ==
In the perspective of regional geology, the Korean Peninsula is on the eastern margins of the North China-Korea platform underlaid by three blocks of Archean age; the Nangrim-Pyeongnam Block, the Gyeonggi and Yeongnam Massifs which are separated by the northeast–southwest direction Imjingang and the Okcheon belts of Phanerozoic age. The Sangdong mine is situated in the northeast part of the Okcheon Belt.

The lithology of Sangdong can be divided into three main zones such as the Pungcheon Formation of The Great Limestone, the Myobong Formation and the Jangsan Quartize from the upper and the lower in the cross-sectional diagram. The Sangdong Mine contains a skarn-type deposit with altered horizons of the Cambrian-age Myobong Formation. The metamorphosed strata include a biotite granite unit located at a depth of 700m which was intersected during exploratory drilling at 700m below. There is the Jangsan quartzite unit in the lower most area underneath the Myobong unit. The Great Limestone unit completes the series of altered horizons overlying the Myobong Formation. There are certain terms on the horizons such as the Hanging Wall, Main, and Footwall horizons based on its geological features from the uppermost to lowermost regions. The mineralised zone strikes east–west direction and dips to the north at between 15° and 30° with extensions of 1.3 km and 1.5 km.
