= Skarn =

Hard, coarse-grained, hydrothermally altered metamorphic rocks

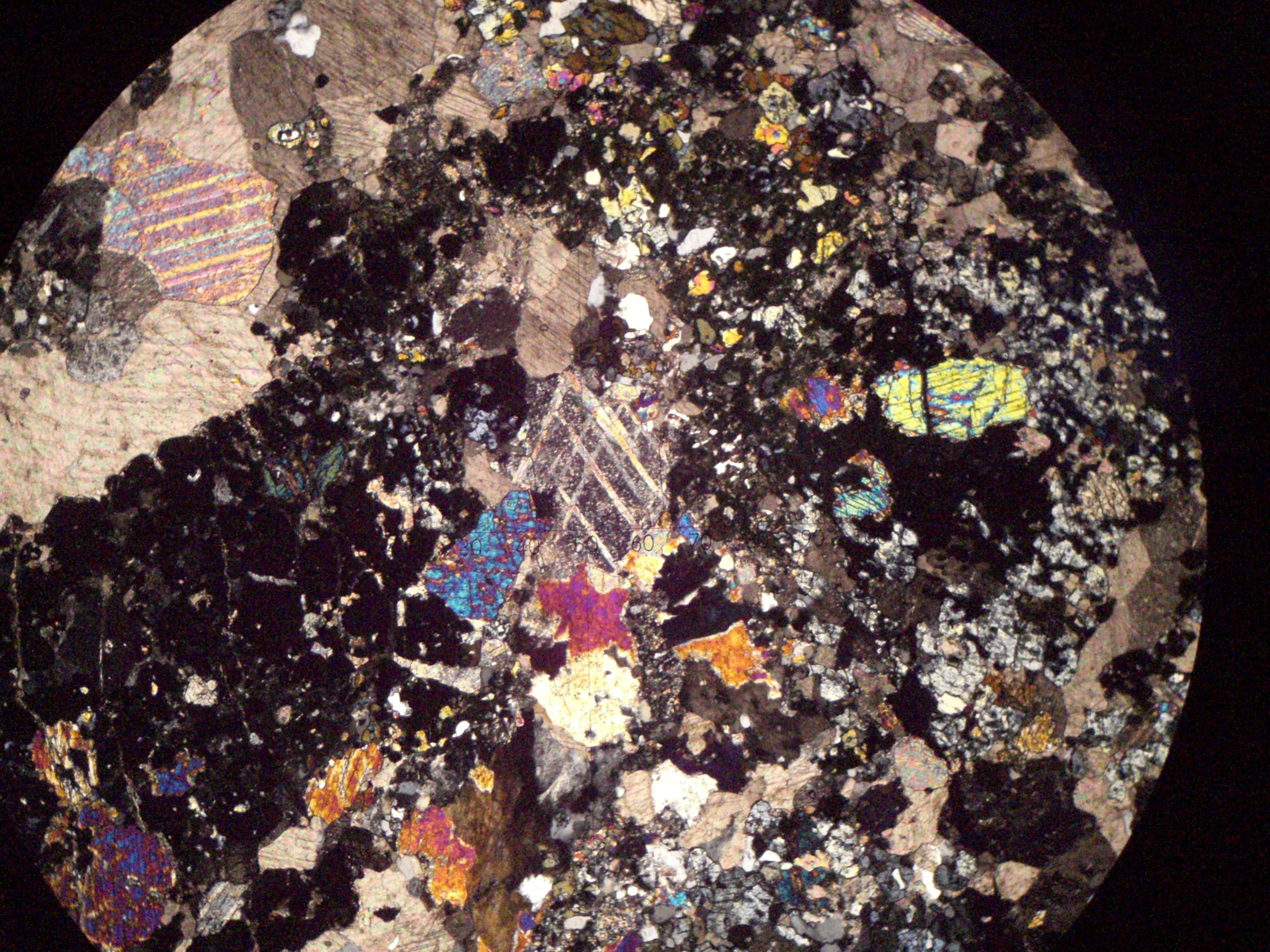
Microscopic view of skarn under crossed polarizers

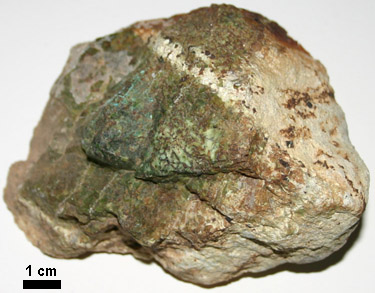
Hand sample of skarn containing serpentinite from the edge of the Alta Stock, Little Cottonwood Canyon, Utah

Skarns or tactites are coarse-grained metamorphic rocks that form by replacement of carbonate-bearing rocks during regional or contact metamorphism and metasomatism. Skarns may form by metamorphic recrystallization of impure carbonate protoliths, bimetasomatic reaction of different lithologies, and infiltration metasomatism by magmatic-hydrothermal fluids. Skarns tend to be rich in calcium-magnesium-iron-manganese-aluminium silicate minerals, which are also referred to as calc-silicate minerals. These minerals form as a result of alteration which occurs when hydrothermal fluids interact with a protolith of either igneous or sedimentary origin. In many cases, skarns are associated with the intrusion of a granitic pluton found in and around faults or shear zones that commonly intrude into a carbonate layer composed of either dolomite or limestone. Skarns can form by regional or contact metamorphism and therefore form in relatively high temperature environments. The hydrothermal fluids associated with the metasomatic processes can originate from a variety of sources; magmatic, metamorphic, meteoric, marine, or even a mix of these. The resulting skarn may consist of a variety of different minerals which are highly dependent on both the original composition of the hydrothermal fluid and the original composition of the protolith.

If a skarn has a respectable amount of ore mineralization that can be mined for a profit, it can be classified as a skarn deposit.

== Etymology ==
Skarn is an old Swedish mining term originally used to describe a type of silicate gangue, or waste rock, associated with iron-ore bearing sulfide deposits apparently replacing Palaeoproterozoic age limestones in Sweden's Persberg mining district.

== Petrology ==
Skarns are composed of calcium-iron-magnesium-manganese-aluminum silicate minerals. Skarn deposits are economically valuable as sources of metals such as tin, tungsten, manganese, copper, gold, zinc, lead, nickel, molybdenum and iron.

A skarn is formed by a variety of metasomatic processes during metamorphism between two adjacent lithologic units. Skarns can form in almost any rock type such as shale, granite, or basalt but the majority of skarns are found in carbonate rocks containing limestone or dolomite. It is common to find skarns near plutons, along faults and major shear zones, in shallow geothermal systems, and on the bottom of the sea floor. The specific mineralogy of skarns are highly related to the mineralogy of the protolith.

Skarn mineralogy is dominated by garnet and pyroxene with a wide variety of calc-silicate and associated minerals, including idocrase, wollastonite, actinolite, magnetite or hematite, epidote and scapolite. Because skarns are formed from silica-rich aqueous fluids replete with incompatible elements, a variety of uncommon mineral types are found in skarns, such as: tourmaline, topaz, beryl, corundum, fluorite, apatite, barite, strontianite, tantalite, anglesite, and others.

== Classification ==
Skarns can be subdivided depending on specific criteria. One way to classify a skarn is by its protolith. If the protolith is of sedimentary origin, it can be referred to as an exoskarn and if the protolith is igneous, it can be called an endoskarn.

Further classification can be made based on the protolith by observing the skarn's dominant composition and the resulting alteration assemblage. If the skarn contains minerals such as olivine, serpentine, phlogopite, magnesium clinopyroxene, orthopyroxene, spinel, pargasite, and minerals from the humite group, it is characteristic of a dolomitic protolith and can be classed as a magnesian skarn. The other class, called calcic skarns, are the replacement products of a limestone protolith with dominant mineral assemblages containing garnet, clinopyroxene, and wollastonite.

Rocks that contain garnet or pyroxene as major phases, and that are also fine-grained, lack iron, and have skarn-like appearances, are generally given the term "skarnoid". Skarnoid is therefore the intermediate stage of a fine-grained hornfels and a coarse-grained skarn.

=== Skarn ore deposits ===
Metal ore deposits that have skarn as gangue are called skarn deposits and can form by any combination of closed metamorphism or open system metasomatism, although most skarn deposits are thought to be related to magmatic-hydrothermal systems. Skarn deposits are classified by their dominant economic element, e.g., a copper (Cu) skarn deposit or a molybdenum (Mo) skarn deposit.

=== Fe (Cu, Ag, Au) skarn deposits ===
The tectonic setting for calcic Fe skarns tends to be the oceanic island arcs. The host rocks tend to range from gabbro to syenite associated with intruding limestone layers. The tectonic setting for magnesium Fe skarns tends to be the continental margin. The host rocks tend to be granodiorite to granite associated with intruding dolomite and dolomitic sedimentary rocks. Magnetite is the principal ore in these types of skarn deposits which its grade yields from 40 to 60%. Chalcopyrite, bornite and pyrite constitute minor ores.

=== Cu (Au, Ag, Mo, W) skarn deposits ===
The tectonic setting for Cu deposits tends to be the Andean-type plutons intruding older continental-margin carbonate layers. The host rocks tend to be quartz diorite and granodiorite. Pyrite, chalcopyrite and magnetite are typically found in higher abundances.

== Formation ==
Generally, there are two types of skarns that form, exoskarns and endoskarns.

Exoskarns are more common and form on the outside of an intrusive body that comes into contact with a reactive rock unit. They are formed when fluids left over from the crystallisation of the intrusion are ejected from the mass at the waning stages of emplacement, in a process called boiling. When these fluids come into contact with reactive rocks, usually carbonates such as limestone or dolomite, the fluids react with them, producing alteration (infiltration metasomatism).

Endoskarns form within the intrusive body where fracturing, cooling joints, and stockworks have been produced, which results in a permeable area. This permeable area can be altered by fluids originally sourced from the intrusion itself, after interacting with surrounding rocks (protolith). Thus, both the composition and the textures of protoliths strongly play a role in the formation of the resulting skarn. Endoskarns are considered to be rare.

Reaction skarns are formed from isochemical metamorphism occurring on thinly interlayered sedimentary units, via small-scale (Note: (on the order of a few centimetres)) metasomatic exchange between adjacent units.

Skarnoids are calc-silicate rocks that are fine-grained and iron poor. Skarnoids tend to be found between hornfels and coarse-grained skarn. Skarnoids commonly reflect the composition of the protolith.

Most large skarn deposits experience a transition from early metamorphism—which forms hornfels, reaction skarns, and skarnoids—to late metamorphism, which forms relatively coarser grained, ore-bearing skarns. The magma intrusion triggers contact metamorphism in the surrounding region, forming hornfels as a result. The recrystallization and phase change of hornfels reflects the composition of the protolith. After the formation of hornfels, metasomatism occurs involving hydrothermal fluids from a source that is magmatic, metamorphic, marine, meteoric, or even a mix of these. This process is called isochemical metamorphism, and can result in the production of a wide range of calc-silicate minerals that form in impure lithology units and along fluid boundaries where small-scale metasomatism occurs (argillite and limestone, and banded iron formation).

The skarn deposits that are considered economically important for containing valuable metals are a result of large-scale metasomatism, where the composition of fluid controls the skarn and its ore mineralogy. They are relatively coarser grained and do not strongly reflect the composition of protolith or surrounding rocks.

Uncommon types of skarns are formed in contact with sulfidic or carbonaceous rocks such as black shales, graphite shales, banded iron formations and, occasionally, salt or evaporites. Here, fluids react less via chemical exchange of ions, but because of the redox-oxidation potential of the wall rocks.

== Ore deposits ==
The major economic metals that are sourced from skarn deposits are copper, tungsten, iron, tin, molybdenum, zinc-lead, and gold. Other minor economic elements include uranium, silver, boron, fluorine, and rare-earth elements.

Some examples of the major economic skarn deposits, both current and historical, are:

- Iron skarns: Dashkesan Mine, Azerbaijan
- Copper skarns: Bingham Canyon Mine, Utah, U.S.A
- Tungsten skarns: Sangdong mine, South Korea
- Gold-bearing skarns: Hedley Mascot Mine, British Columbia, Canada
- Zinc-lead skarns: Santa Eulalia, Chihuahua, Mexico
- Nickel skarns: Avebury Mine, Zeehan, Tasmania (Australia)
- Molybdenum skarns: Yangchiachangtze mine, China

== See also ==
- Ore genesis – How the various types of mineral deposits form within the Earth's crust
