= Mika (footballer, born 1991) =

Portuguese footballer

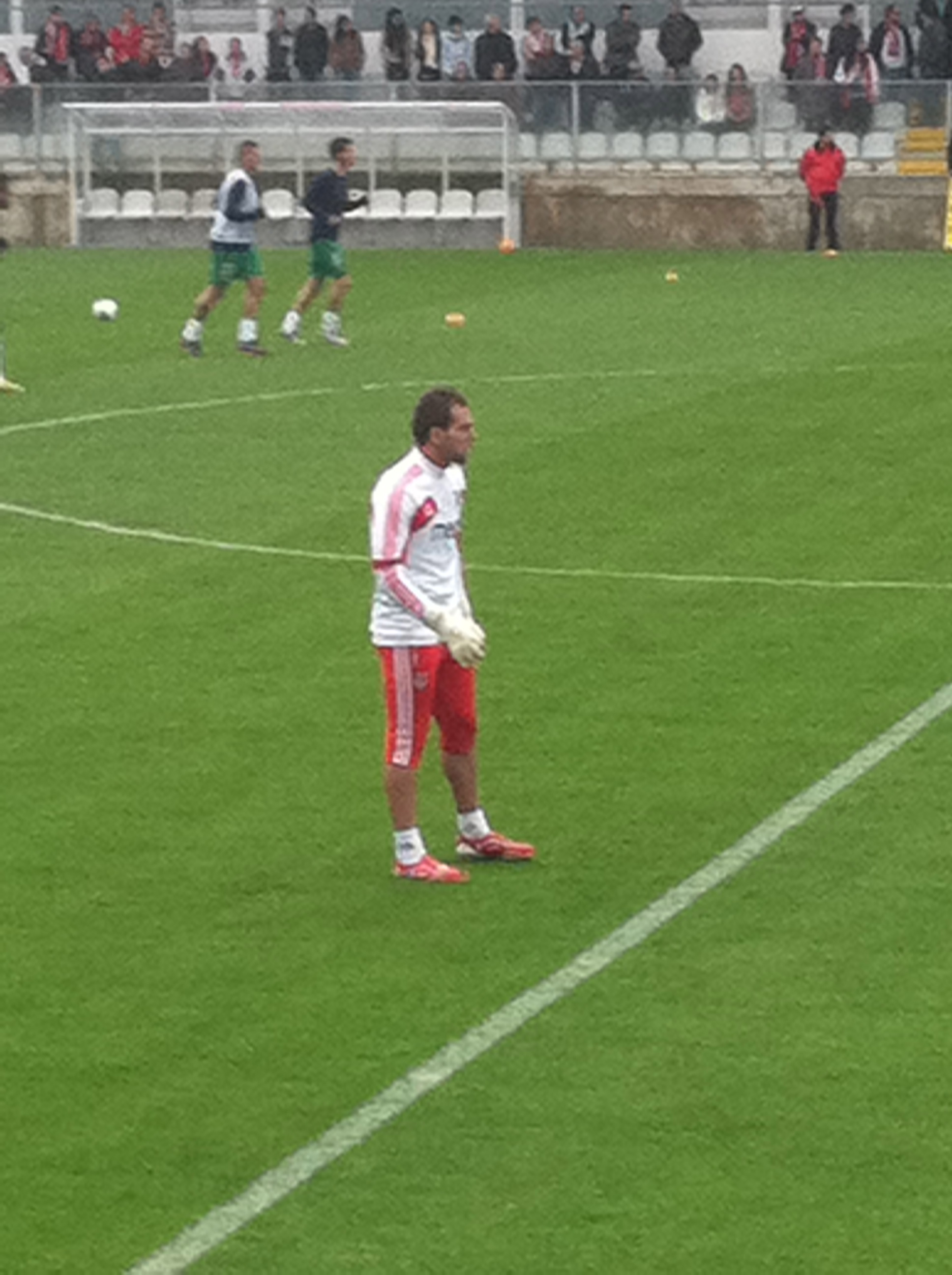
- Mika with Benfica in 2012

Personal information
- Full name: Michael Simões Domingues
- Date of birth: 8 March 1991 (age 35)
- Place of birth: Yverdon, Switzerland
- Height: 1.88 m (6 ft 2 in)
- Position: Goalkeeper

Youth career
- 2002–2006: Sporting Pombal
- 2006–2010: União Leiria

Senior career*
Years	Team	Apps	(Gls)
2010–2011	União Leiria	4	(0)
2011–2013	Benfica	0	(0)
2012–2014	Benfica B	31	(0)
2014	Atlético	16	(0)
2014–2016	Boavista	58	(0)
2016–2018	Sunderland	0	(0)
2018	União Leiria	2	(0)
2018–2019	B-SAD	2	(0)
2019–2022	Académica	75	(0)
2023	Vitória Setúbal	13	(0)
2024–2026	Moreirense	3	(0)

International career
2011	Portugal U20	17	(0)
2011–2012	Portugal U21	6	(0)
Medal record
Men's football
Representing Portugal
FIFA U-20 World Cup
Runner-up	2011 Colombia
- * Club domestic league appearances and goals as of 16:29, 16 May 2026 (UTC)

Michael Simões Domingues CvIH (born 8 March 1991), known as Mika, is a professional footballer who plays as a goalkeeper.

Born in Switzerland, he represented Portugal at youth level.

== Club career ==
Born in Yverdon-les-Bains, Switzerland to Portuguese parents, Mika joined U.D. Leiria's youth ranks in 2006, aged 15. He was promoted to the main squad for the 2009–10 season, as third choice. On 26 February 2010, in a home match against Vitória de Guimarães, he made his Primeira Liga debut, coming on as a substitute for Carlão after Hélder Godinho received a red card for committing a foul inside the box – he was not able to prevent Andrezinho from scoring the game's only goal in the subsequent penalty kick. The following campaign he was still a backup, but two of his three appearances were against Sporting CP and S.L. Benfica.

On 7 July 2011, whilst on international duty with the Portugal under-20s, Mika signed a five-year contract with Benfica for €500,000. He played no official matches during 2011–12, playing understudy to experienced Artur and Eduardo, and went on to spend the following two seasons with the B team in the Segunda Liga.

On 27 January 2014, Mika cut ties with the Lisbon club. He signed for two years with second division side Atlético Clube de Portugal the same day, being first choice during his short tenure but not being able to help prevent relegation.

Mika returned to the top flight in summer 2014, penning a three-year deal with Boavista FC. During the 2016 off-season, he gained interest from Premier League clubs Leicester City and Sunderland: initial reports stated he agreed a move to the latter on transfer deadline day, but the deal was not finalised as the transfer window had already closed. The reason for the delayed transfer was a technical fault at the Portuguese end, but after an appeal to FIFA he was granted permission to join and signed a two-year contract.

Mika played no competitive games in his first season, serving as backup to Jordan Pickford and Vito Mannone. On 12 January 2018, player and the club mutually agreed to terminate his contract.

Mika returned to União de Leiria on 8 March 2018, with the team now competing in the third tier. He moved back to his country's top flight in the ensuing June, signing a one-year deal with B-SAD.

On 2 September 2019, the free agent Mika agreed to a one-year contract at Académica de Coimbra in division two. He extended his link in July 2020 and June 2021, leaving at the end of the 2021–22 campaign.

Following a brief spell in the Liga 3 with Vitória de Setúbal, Mika returned to the top tier in January 2024 on a short-term contract at Moreirense FC, completing the squad in that department with Brazilians Kewin and Caio Secco.

== International career ==
Mika was Portugal's starter at the 2011 FIFA U-20 World Cup in Colombia. He helped the national team reach the final without conceding a single goal, before losing to Brazil 3–2 in the decisive match. In the quarter-finals against Argentina he saved three penalties in the shootout and, in the following game, against France, he broke the record for number of minutes without conceding a goal in U-20 World Cup history in a 2–0 win; eventually, he was voted as best goalkeeper in the tournament.

Subsequently, Mika was chosen by under-21 manager Rui Jorge for the 2013 UEFA European Championship qualifying campaign. He played half of the games, with Portugal missing out on the play-off round.

== Career statistics ==
As of match played 18 May 2024

Appearances and goals by club, season and competition
Club	Season	League			National cup		League cup		Other		Total	
Club	Season	Division	Apps	Goals	Apps	Goals	Apps	Goals	Apps	Goals	Apps	Goals
União Leiria	2009–10	Primeira Liga	1	0	0	0	0	0	—		1	0
União Leiria	2010–11	Primeira Liga	3	0	1	0	0	0	—		4	0
União Leiria	Total		4	0	1	0	0	0	—		5	0
Benfica	2011–12	Primeira Liga	0	0	0	0	0	0	0	0	0	0
Benfica B	2012–13	Segunda Liga	30	0	—		—		—		30	0
Benfica B	2013–14	Segunda Liga	1	0	—		—		—		1	0
Benfica B	Total		31	0	—		—		—		31	0
Atlético	2013–14	Segunda Liga	15	0	0	0	0	0	—		15	0
Boavista	2014–15	Primeira Liga	29	0	1	0	1	0	—		31	0
Boavista	2015–16	Primeira Liga	26	0	3	0	1	0	—		30	0
Boavista	2016–17	Primeira Liga	3	0	0	0	0	0	—		3	0
Boavista	Total		58	0	4	0	2	0	—		64	0
Sunderland	2016–17	Premier League	0	0	0	0	0	0	—		0	0
Sunderland	2017–18	Championship	0	0	0	0	0	0	—		0	0
Sunderland	Total		0	0	0	0	0	0	—		0	0
Sunderland U21	2016–17	—			—		—		1 (Note: Appearance in EFL Trophy)	0	1	0
Sunderland U21	2017–18	—			—		—		1	0	1	0
Sunderland U21	Total		—		—		—		2	0	2	0
União Leiria	2017–18	Campeonato Portugal	2	0	0	0	—		—		2	0
B-SAD	2018–19	Primeira Liga	2	0	2	0	3	0	—		7	0
B-SAD	2019–20	Primeira Liga	0	0	0	0	1	0	—		1	0
B-SAD	Total		2	0	2	0	4	0	—		8	0
Académica	2019–20	LigaPro	18	0	3	0	0	0	—		21	0
Académica	2020–21	Liga Portugal 2	34	0	2	0	—		—		36	0
Académica	2021–22	Liga Portugal 2	23	0	1	0	1	0	—		25	0
Académica	Total		75	0	6	0	1	0	—		82	0
Vitória Setúbal	2022–23	Liga 3	13	0	0	0	—		—		13	0
Moreirense	2023–24	Primeira Liga	1	0	0	0	0	0	—		1	0
Career Total			201	0	13	0	7	0	2	0	223	0

== Honours ==
Portugal U20

- FIFA U-20 World Cup runner-up: 2011

Individual

- FIFA U-20 World Cup Golden Glove: 2011

Orders

- Knight of the Order of Prince Henry
