= Vale Formoso =

- Civil parish
- Location in Portugal
- Coordinates: 40.377°N 7.379°W
- Country: Portugal
- Region: Centro
- Intermunic. comm.: Beiras e Serra da Estrela
- District: Castelo Branco
- Municipality: Covilhã
- Disbanded: 2013

Area
  - Total: 11.31 km^{2} (4.37 sq mi)

Population (2001)
  - Total: 640
  - Density: 57/km^{2} (150/sq mi)
- Time zone: UTC+00:00 (WET)
  - Summer (DST): UTC+01:00 (WEST)

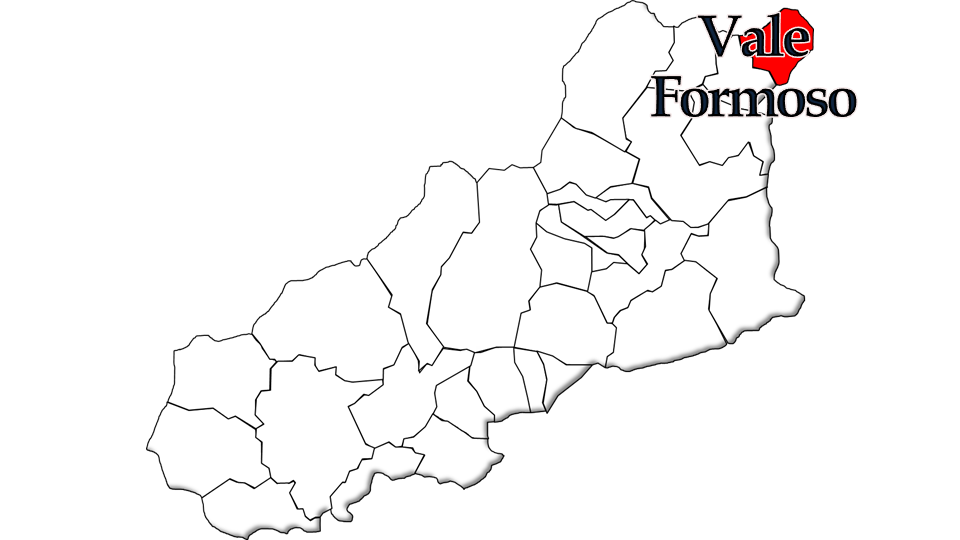
Vale Formoso in Covilhã municipality

Vale Formoso is a former civil parish in the municipality of Covilhã, Castelo Branco District, Portugal. In 2013, the parish merged into the new parish Vale Formoso e Aldeia do Souto. It had a population of 640, in 2001, and an area of 11.31 km^{2} (4,37 mi^{2}), in 2012.

It changed its name on 6 August 1944, having previously been called "Aldeia do Mato."
