= Ferro (Covilhã) =

- Civil parish
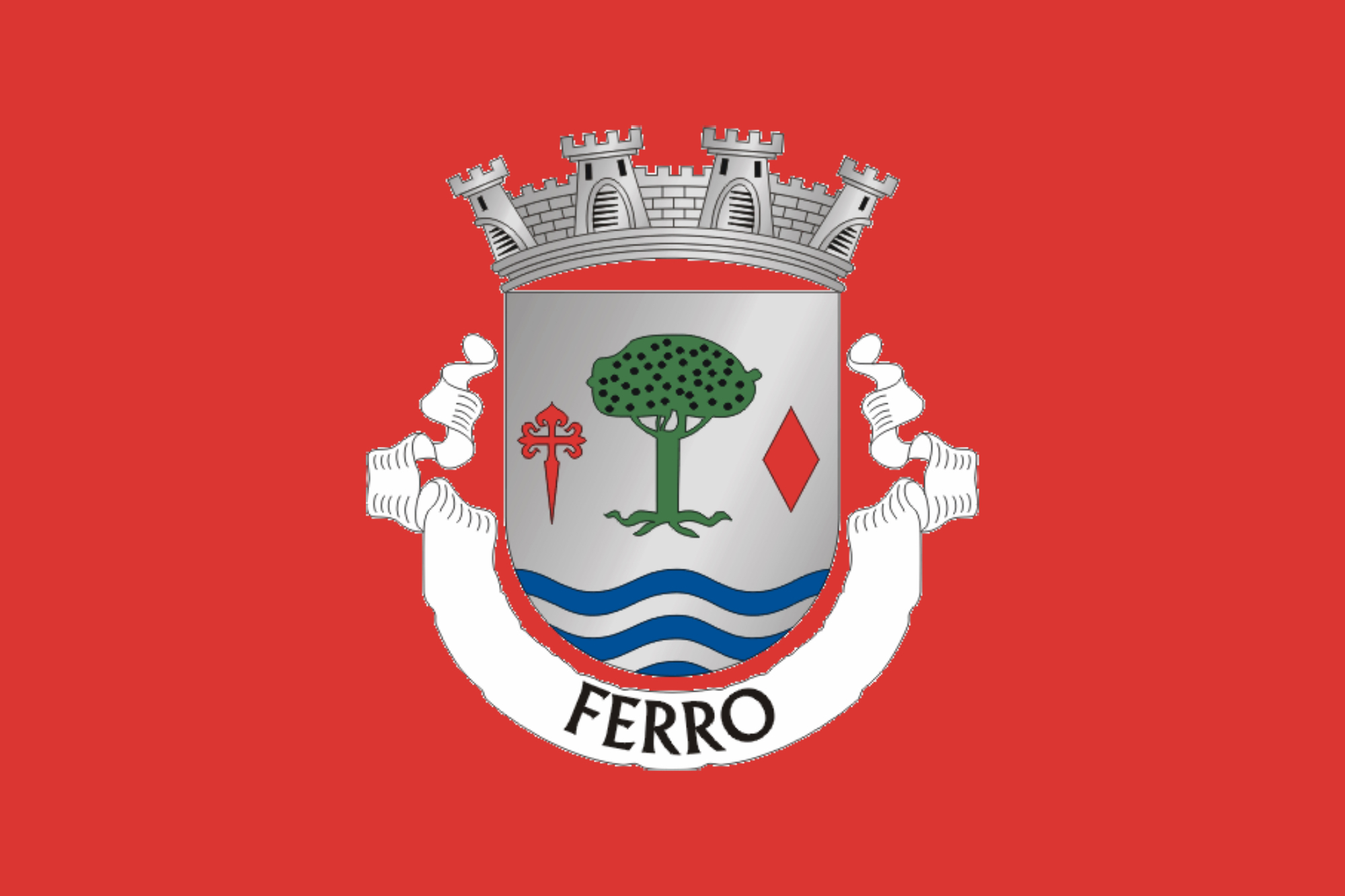
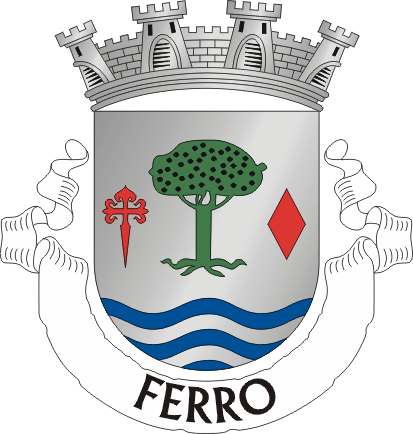
- Flag Coat of arms

- Location in Portugal
- Coordinates: 40.235°N 7.445°W
- Country: Portugal
- Region: Centro
- Intermunic. comm.: Beiras e Serra da Estrela
- District: Castelo Branco
- Municipality: Covilhã

Area
  - Total: 30.76 km^{2} (11.88 sq mi)

Population (2011)
  - Total: 1,700
  - Density: 55/km^{2} (140/sq mi)
- Time zone: UTC+00:00 (WET)
  - Summer (DST): UTC+01:00 (WEST)

Ferro is a town and civil parish in the municipality of Covilhã, Portugal. The population in 2011 was 1,700, in an area of 30.76 square kilometres (11.88 sq mi). Ferro is the Portuguese word for iron.

== History ==
The settlement of this parish goes back to Roman times, since it was this people that gave the name to the village, through the Latin word Ferrum, because the Romans, in the lands they conquered, took advantage of the mineral resources of the subsoil, and it was known the richness of this region in iron, which is why it is not surprising that the toponym has exactly to do with this reality of the civil parish. From that period, several archaeological remains were found that prove the previous statements: coins, pieces of pottery, bricks, manual millstones and carved stones are some of the examples that we can point out. Ferro was also a curate attached to the priory of Santiago da Covilhã, with an annual income of two hundred thousand réis. In terms of architectural heritage, the Mother Church, with baroque features, built in the 18th century, highlights its interior altars in gilded woodcarving and the altarpiece of the tabernacle. The existing altars are dedicated to Nossa Senhora da Conceição and Nossa Senhora do Rosário. As for the Holy Spirit chapel, it maintains most of its original elements, having been built in the 16th century and having belonged to the Order of Santiago. The 18th century chapel of the Sacred Heart of Mary is located on the outskirts of the town and has a simple architecture that makes it more beautiful. The great growth that the civil parish has experienced since the second half of the 20th century was rewarded with the elevation to the category of town on June 21, 1995.

== Geography ==
Located in the southwest of the municipality and near the left bank of the river Zêzere in an area called Cova da Beira, the civil parish of Ferro is about 11 kilometers from the city of Covilhã which is the seat of the municipality. The city of Fundão is about 16 kilometers to south-southwest by road. It is composed by the villages of Freixo, Lameiras, Madeira, Monte Serrano, Penedia, Rasas, Ribeiro do Moinho, Sesmarias, Sítio do Marujo, Sítio da Póvoa, Sítio do Ribeiro de Linhares and Souto Alto. Ferro is limited to the north by part of the parish of Peraboa, separated from Ferro by the Ribeira de Caria, and also by the Zêzere River, which serves as the natural boundary between this parish and Boidobra. To the south it borders the lands of Peroviseu, to the east is limited by the parishes of Peraboa and Peroviseu and to the west it borders the civil parishes of Tortosendo and Alcaria. According to Maria Ascensão Rodrigues, author of "Ferro, Cova da Beira", "Ferro has, as its main elevation, a small mountain range, on the slope of which is located, and from which one enjoys, either by day or by night a breathtaking panorama, with the sumptuous Serra da Estrela as a background in which are embedded, as jewels that adorn it, the typical and picturesque city of Covilhã. (...) Still nestles at his feet Boidobra, with its uber-gorgeous and wonderful valley, separated from the fertile lands of Ferro by the river Zêzere".

== Economy ==
Of markedly rural characteristics, its population is dedicated primarily to agricultural activity, however, since the second half of the 20th century, there has been an increase in the number of people working in industry, and some trade and services have also emerged. The town of Ferro is a satellite town of both the city of Covilhã and the city of Fundão. The area is famed for its cherry and chestnut orchards and related thematic fairs held in the town every year.
