= Sérgio Paulico =

Portuguese footballer

Personal information
- Full name: Sérgio Gabriel Rito Paulico
- Date of birth: 4 April 1991 (age 35)
- Place of birth: Covilhã, Portugal
- Height: 1.70 m (5 ft 7 in)
- Position: Midfielder

Team information
- Current team: Sporting Covilhã
- Number: 18

Youth career
- 2008–2010: Sporting Covilhã

Senior career*
Years	Team	Apps	(Gls)
2010–	Sporting Covilhã	0	(0)
- * Club domestic league appearances and goals as of 10 October 2010

Sérgio Gabriel Rito Paulico (born 4 April 1991 in Covilhã) is a Portuguese footballer who plays for S.C. Covilhã, as a midfielder.

== See also ==
- Football in Portugal
- List of football clubs in Portugal
