= Parkurbis =

Science park in Covilhã, Portugal

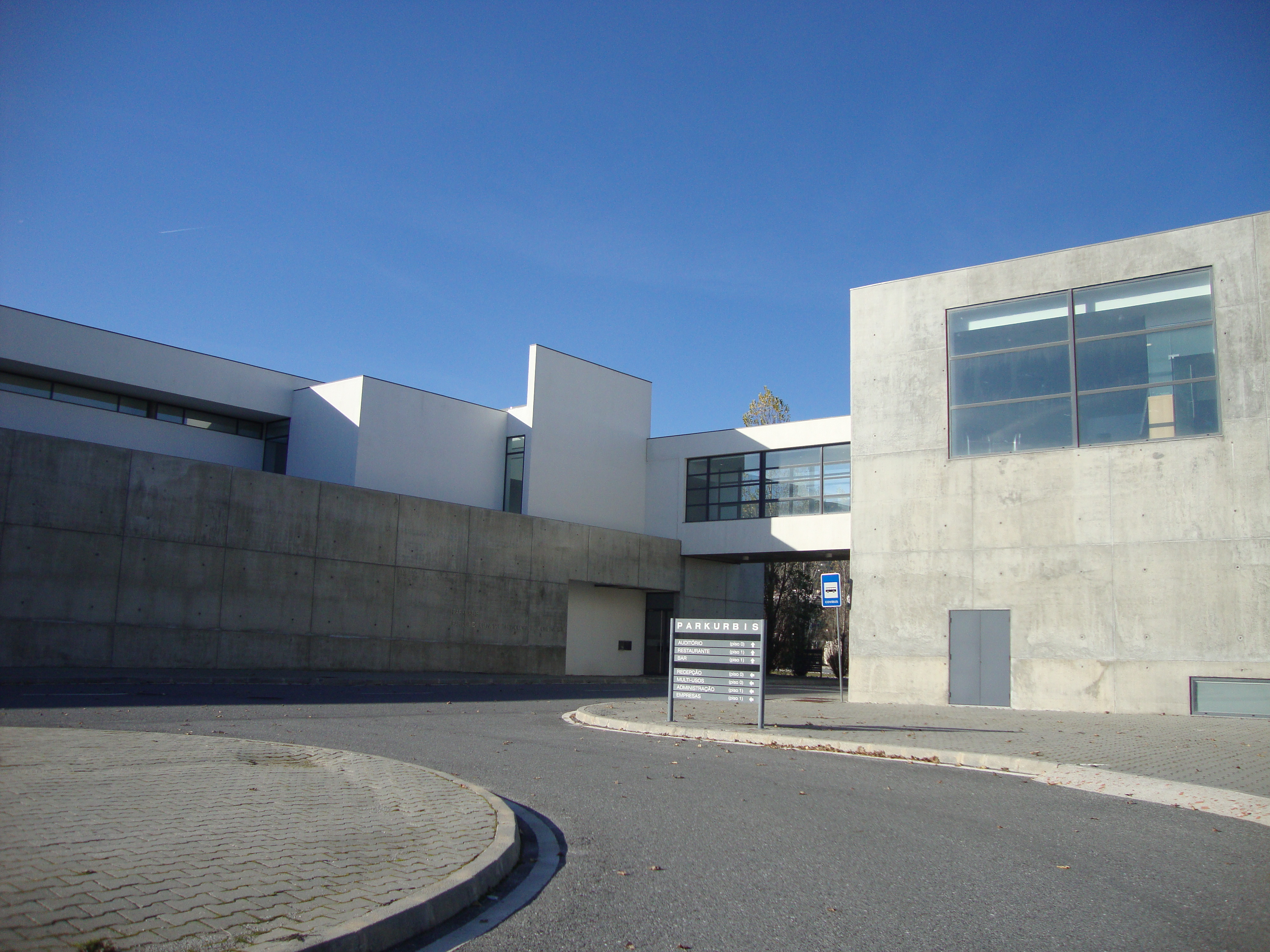
A view of Parkurbis.

Parkurbis is a Portuguese science park in Covilhã. This organization is oriented to the support and fostering of new technology based businesses, providing support services to start ups and infrastructures that fit the needs of the new entrepreneurs and assure them the best conditions for the consolidation of their business during the first years of the company. Its aims include the creation of links between the University of Beira Interior (UBI), and the local companies and businessmen, as well as to promote that R&D supply meet the demands of Parkurbis-based businesses. Frulact is one of the largest exporting companies with industrial facilities in Parkurbis.
