= Vale Formoso e Aldeia do Souto =

- Civil parish
- Location in Portugal
- Coordinates: 40.377°N 7.377°W
- Country: Portugal
- Region: Centro
- Intermunic. comm.: Beiras e Serra da Estrela
- District: Castelo Branco
- Municipality: Covilhã

Area
  - Total: 18.90 km^{2} (7.30 sq mi)

Population (2011)
  - Total: 814
  - Density: 43/km^{2} (110/sq mi)
- Time zone: UTC+00:00 (WET)
  - Summer (DST): UTC+01:00 (WEST)

Vale Formoso e Aldeia do Souto is a civil parish in the municipality of Covilhã, Portugal. It was formed in 2013 by the merger of the former parishes Vale Formoso and Aldeia do Souto. The population in 2011 was 814, in an area of 18.90 km^{2}.
