= Maria Alberta Menéres =

Portuguese author, children's writer, journalist, and poet (1930–2019)

Maria Alberta Menéres ComM
- Born: 25 August 1930; Mafamude, Vila Nova de Gaia, Portugal
- Died: 15 April 2019 (aged 88); Lisbon, Portugal
- Education: Faculty of Humanities of the University of Lisbon
- Occupations: Author; Children's author; Journalist; Poet
- Years active: 1952–2019
- Spouse: E. M. Melo de Castro
- Children: Eugénia Melo e Castro

Maria Alberta Menéres ComM (25 August 1930 – 15 April 2019) was a Portuguese author, children's writer, journalist and poet. She authored more than 100 books for children and young people when she began her professional writing career in 1952. Menéres also worked as a teacher, newspaper and magazine journalist as well as for Rádio e Televisão de Portugal. She received the International Poetry Contest Giacomo Leopardi in 1960, the Gulbenkian Grand Prize for Literature for Children and Youth in 1986 and was appointed Commander of the Order of Merit in 2010.

== Early life and public career ==
Menéres' birth was on 25 August 1930, in the family home located in the parish of Mafamude, Vila Nova de Gaia, North Portugal. She learnt to read on her own by the age of five and read books from the region of her birth and Brazil. Menéres and her family left Vila Nova de Gaia when she was aged six and relocated to the countryside about 10 km (6.2 mi) from the closest village. She later moved to Lisbon, and matriculated to Faculty of Humanities of the University of Lisbon studying Historical-Philosophical Sciences.

Between 1965 and 1973, Menéres taught the Portuguese language and history as a professor of Technical, Preparatory and Secondary Education, and at the same time collaborated with various newspapers such as Diário de Notícias, Cadernos do Meio Dia, Diário Popular and Távola Redonda. She served as director of the Pais & Filhos magazine for three years. Menéres went on to work at Rádio e Televisão de Portugal (RTP) as Director of Children and Youth Programs from 1974 to 1986, authoring and producing multiple programmes for the network. One programme she made on the invitation of José Manuel Nunes Pirilampo Mágico for RTP and Antena 1. Menéres was the creator of the charitable concept Pirilampo Mágico in 1974. Between 1993 and 1998, she was advisor to the Ombudsman, being put in charge of support of Portugal's children and elderly.

== Writing career ==
She was the author of more than 100 books for children and young people, beginning her professional writing career in 1952. Menéres compiled collections of poetry such as Intervalo in 1952; A Palavra Imperceptivel in 1955; Agua Memória in 1960; Os Mosquitos de Suburna in 1967 and O Jogo dos Siléncios in 1996. Agua Memória won her the 1960 International Poetry Contest Giacomo Leopardi. Menéres wrote children's books like Conversos com Versos in 1968, Lengalenga do Vento in 1976, Um Peixe no Ar in 1980, Dez Dedos Dez Segredos in 1985, Corre, Corre, Pintainho in 1988, O Mistério do Nevão Assombrado (1989), O Meu Livro de Natal in 1991, and Sigam a Borboleta! in 1996. She received the Gulbenkian Grand Prize for Literature for Children and Youth in 1986. The reason given was for Menéres was "for the whole of her literary work and maintaining a high level of quality." A total of 15 adult books was written by her and she also translated and adapted several books as well as authoring some plays.

== Personal life ==
Menéres was married to the poet E. M. Melo de Castro. She has one daughter, the singer Eugénia Melo e Castro. Menéres was appointed Commander of the Order of Merit in 2010. On 15 April 2019, she died at her home in Lisbon. Menéres was cremated at Olivais Cemetery in Lisbon on the afternoon of 17 April.

== Legacy ==
António Mota, the writer, called her "a pioneer. She was the first author to go to schools to talk about books." The Portuguese Minister of Culture said of Menéres: "A woman with an extraordinary and permanent commitment to education and the promotion of the pleasure of reading, she made making known to others a responsibility that surpassed her condition as a writer."
