= Rui Faleiro =

Portuguese scientist

Rui (Ruy) Faleiro [ˈʁuj fɐˈlɐjɾu], also known as Ruy de Faleira, was a Portuguese cosmographer, astrologer, and astronomer who was the principal scientific organizer behind Ferdinand Magellan's circumnavigation of the world.

== Early career ==
Faleiro was born in Covilhã, Portugal, at the end of the fifteenth century. In his youth, he served as a page of Queen Eleanor, consort of King John II, alongside Magellan. Faleiro began serving Manuel I of Portugal when he succeeded John II in 1495. In 1516, Faleiro applied for the position of royal astronomer, but was rejected by Manuel.

Magellan and Faleiro proposed an expedition to the Spice Islands repeatedly to King Manuel, but were rejected each time. Frustrated, the two decided to seek assistance from the Spanish crown instead. In October 1517, Magellan relocated to Seville, Spain, and Faleiro joined him in December.

Faleiro's brother, Francisco Faleiro, also an accomplished cosmographer, journeyed to Spain as well, and served as a 'hydrographer and nautical adviser' to the Casa de Contratación.

== Magellan expedition ==
Having been rejected by the Portuguese king, Faleiro and Magellan presented their proposal to the Casa de Contratación, which managed expeditions on behalf of the crown. They were confident that a strait leading to the Pacific existed along the coast of Brazil somewhere near the 40th parallel south. Faleiro boasted that with his expertise in navigation and astronomy, he would be able to prove that the Spice Islands were situated on the Spanish side of the line of Tordesillas.

On 22 March 1518 King Charles of Spain approved the expedition. Magellan and Faleiro were named co-captains of the expedition.

Fragmentary sources suggest that Faleiro may have suffered from increasing mental instability as preparations for the expedition proceeded. Sebastian Alvarés, a Portuguese spy reporting to King Manuel, wrote that Faleiro was "like a man deranged in his senses". An acquaintance of Faleiro wrote that he "sleeps very little and wanders around almost out of his mind".

On 26 July 1519 King Charles, perhaps in response to Faleiro's condition, issued a royal certificate stating that Faleiro would not sail with the expedition, and would instead stay behind in Seville to prepare for another expedition to follow. The later expedition never took place, and may have been a fiction intended to preserve Faleiro's dignity. Other sources state that Faleiro chose to remain behind after performing a horoscope reading indicating that the voyage would be fatal for him.

The expedition left Seville without Faleiro on 10 August 1519. The fleet kept Faleiro's state-of-the-art navigational tools, including compasses, astrolabes, hourglasses, and charts. Of the 24 charts taken on the voyage, six were personally created by Faleiro. The rest were created by cosmographer Nuño Garcia (seven under the supervision of Faleiro, and eleven supervised by Magellan). In his duties as the expedition's astronomer and astrologist, Faleiro was replaced by the Spanish cosmographer Andrés de San Martín.

== Later life ==
After Magellan's fleet set sail, Faleiro returned to Portugal, where he was imprisoned. During his imprisonment he suffered a mental breakdown, but was eventually released. He secretly returned to Seville. The Casa de Contratación awarded him and his brother separation pay "because they had arrived worn out and penniless". His remaining years were lived in obscurity.

== Accomplishments ==
Faleiro was one of the first to apply the most rigorously scientific method of determining latitude and longitude.
