= Cantar-Galo e Vila do Carvalho =

- Civil parish
- Location in Portugal
- Coordinates: 40.30°N 7.50°W
- Country: Portugal
- Region: Centro
- Intermunic. comm.: Beiras e Serra da Estrela
- District: Castelo Branco
- Municipality: Covilhã

Area
  - Total: 15.80 km^{2} (6.10 sq mi)

Population (2011)
  - Total: 3,974
  - Density: 250/km^{2} (650/sq mi)
- Time zone: UTC+00:00 (WET)
  - Summer (DST): UTC+01:00 (WEST)

Cantar-Galo e Vila do Carvalho is a civil parish in the municipality of Covilhã, Portugal. It was formed in 2013 by the merger of the former parishes Cantar-Galo and Vila do Carvalho. The population in 2011 was 3,974, in an area of 15.80 square kilometres (6.10 sq mi).
