= Eugénia Melo e Castro =

- Born: Maria Eugénia Menéres de Melo e Castro; 6 June 1958 (age 68); Covilhã, Portugal
- Occupation: Singer-songwriter
- Years active: 1979–present
- Website: www.eugeniameloecastro.com

Maria Eugénia Menéres de Melo e Castro (Covilhã, 6 June 1958) is a Portuguese singer-songwriter.

== Personal life ==
Eugénia was born in the city of Covilhã, central inland Portugal, in 1958, and lived in the city until she was 15. She left the city for studying in Lisbon. Her father, Ernesto de Melo e Castro, was a poet, professor and textile engineer (Bradford, United Kingdom) who earned a doctorate in literature from the University of São Paulo, and her mother Maria Alberta Menéres, was a writer. Her grandfather, a chemical engineer, was a noted entrepreneur in the important textiles industrial sector of Covilhã. Her grandfather Ernesto was a conductor, composer, and violinist. Her first contact with the professional music scene came through collaborative works for José Afonso, Vitorino and Sérgio Godinho, among others. Eugénia studied and lived in different locations during her teen years, and when she was 21, already divorced and mother of a girl, she went to Brazil to pursue her desire of being a singer-songwriter. She maintains houses in São Paulo (Brazil) and in Portugal. Melo e Castro has Portuguese Jewish ancestry.

== Career ==
Her first album, released in 1982,Terra de Mel, included collaborations of several Portuguese and Brazilian musicians. These associations have been often in the rest of her discography. Her music is framed in MPB (Brazilian Popular Music). She made theatre in 1977/78 with A Barraca (Portugal) and appeared in a number of movie and television works.

In 2015 he releases his first children's album, "Conversas com Versos", 14 poems by his mother, taken from the book of the same name. Ney Matogrosso is her guest on this record, on the track O MEU CHAPÉU.

In 2018 he releases MAR VIRTUAL, piano and voice, with Emilio Mendonça, dedicated to the work of his father, putting to music experimental poems, and concrete poetry.

== Discography ==
- Terra de Mel (Polygram, 1982)
- Águas de Todo O Ano (Polygram, 1983)
- Eugénia Melo e Castro III (Polygram, 1986)
- Coração Imprevisto (EMI, 1988)
- Canções e Momentos (Compilation, Polygram, 1989)
- Amor é Cego e Vê (Polygram, 1990)
- Lisboa Dentro de Mim (BMG, 1993)
- Canta Vinicíus de Moraes (Megadiscos/Som Livre, 1994)
- Ao Vivo Em São Paulo (Som Livre, 1996)
- Canta Vinicíus de Moraes (Sony, 2000)
- Ao Vivo Em São Paulo (Som Livre, 2000)
- A Luz do Meu Caminho (MVM, 2000)
- Recomeço (Som Livre, 2001)
- Motor da Luz (Som Livre, 2001)
- Paz (Som Livre, 2002)
- Des Cons Tru Ção (Megamúsica/ Atração, 2005)
- PoPortugal (Universal, 2007)
- Paz (Universal, 2007)
- Des Cons tru Ção (Universal, 2007)
- Canta, canta mais (Farol, 2010)
- Um gosto de sol (Selo SESC/BRASIL 2011)

=== Collections ===
- A música em Pessoa (1985) – Emissário De Um Rei Desconhecido
- Bocage – O Triunfo do Amor (1998) – Liberdade
- Songbook Chico Buarque (1999) – Tanto Mar (c/ Wagner Tiso)
