= Frulact =

Frulact – Ingredientes para a Indústria de Laticínios, Lda. is a food industry company, part of France-based Ardian since 2020, which is specialized in fruit processing and is headquartered in Maia, Portugal. Its aim is the manufacture of food products like fruit compounds for food industries. It has industrial and commercial facilities in Maia, Covilhã, Canada, Morocco, France and South Africa. It produces fruit based products by developing fruit transformation activities in a number of different ways. Among its customers are major leading companies such as Danone, Nestlé, Yoplait, Lactogal, Unilever and Emmi.

== History ==
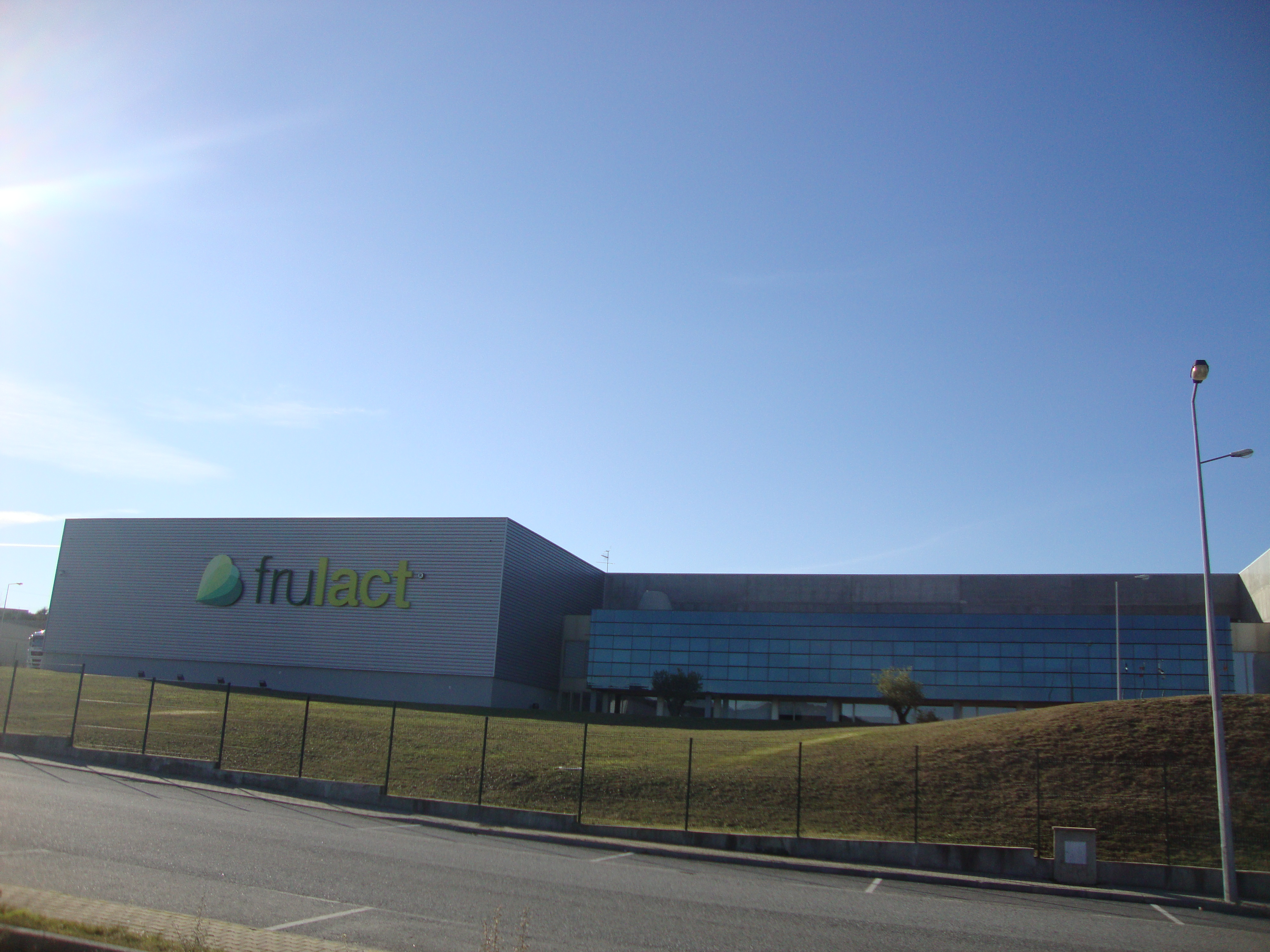
A manufacturing plant of Frulact in Covilhã, Portugal.

Frulact was created in Maia, in 1987. The launch of this unit was the culminating point resulting from its mentors' years of experience in the industry of dairy products. In 1998, Frulact expanded to Ferro, Covilhã, with a new plant, localised nearby great fruit cultivation areas of Cova da Beira subregion. The following year was benchmarked by winning new strategic borders. Frulact arrived to Morocco to supply a range of industries from the food sector and mass consumption market. Frulact continued its expanding process and arrived to Tunisia in 2000 with a new plant, which is operating as a platform to supply North Africa and Middle East markets. In 2007, a new unit started to operate in the Parkurbis science park in Tortosendo, Covilhã. This is a strategic plant localised nearby areas with high fruit production levels. The following years, Frulact open 3 new plants (Morocco and Algeria – 2008; France – 2009) reinforcing its presence in Europe and in the MENA markets. In 2012, another step forward on the company multinational level was given with the opening of a new plant in South Africa and of another plant in Morocco, which is entirely dedicated to the 1st transformation of fruit. 2012 was also the year of Frulact's 25th birthday celebrated with the opening of a RDI centre next to Maia plant, which is located 5 km from the Oporto's International Airport (the largest in the North of Portugal). Based on an agreement announced on January 15, 2020, and after having overcome all legal precedent conditions, 100% of Frulact’s share capital was acquired by France-based Ardian.

== Research and development ==
In partnership with different entities, among them universities, Frulact has been developing research studies in different areas, such as: methodologies to optimise the quality of fruits designed for industrial use, heat exchange technologies, pesticide detection methodologies, development of natural colourings designed for food industry, among others.
