= Hélder Godinho =

Portuguese footballer

Personal information
- Full name: Hélder Manuel Teles Godinho
- Date of birth: 8 September 1977 (age 49)
- Place of birth: Covilhã, Portugal
- Height: 1.90 m (6 ft 3 in)
- Position: Goalkeeper

Youth career
- 1988–1992: Núcleo DS
- 1992–1996: Guarda

Senior career*
Years	Team	Apps	(Gls)
1996	Guarda	2	(0)
1996–1997	Oliveira Hospital		
1997–1999	Guarda	14	(0)
1999–2000	Académico Viseu	13	(0)
2000–2001	Operário	37	(0)
2001–2002	Feirense	16	(0)
2002–2003	Vilanovense	3	(0)
2003–2004	Académico Viseu	12	(0)
2004–2009	Feirense	89	(0)
2009–2010	União Leiria	5	(0)
2010–2011	Aves	29	(0)
2011–2012	Braşov	0	(0)
2012–2013	Santa Clara	39	(0)
2013–2014	Académico Viseu	11	(0)
2014–2016	Oliveirense	7	(0)
2016–2017	Santa Cruz Alvarenga	16	(0)
Total		291	(0)
- * Club domestic league appearances and goals

Hélder Manuel Teles Godinho (born 8 September 1977) is a Portuguese former professional footballer who played as a goalkeeper.

== Club career ==
Born in Covilhã, Godinho played in the lower leagues of Portuguese football until the age of 27, when he signed for C.D. Feirense of the second division in the 2004 off-season. During three of the five seasons with the club, he was first-choice.

For 2009–10, Godinho joined Primeira Liga side U.D. Leiria, but was only a backup during his spell, appearing in just eight official matches. He returned to division two in the following campaign, signing with C.D. Aves.

Godinho spent the 2011–12 season with FC Brașov in Romania, playing second-fiddle to compatriot Mário Felgueiras and being released in June 2012.
