= Covilhã =

- Municipality
- City of Covilhã
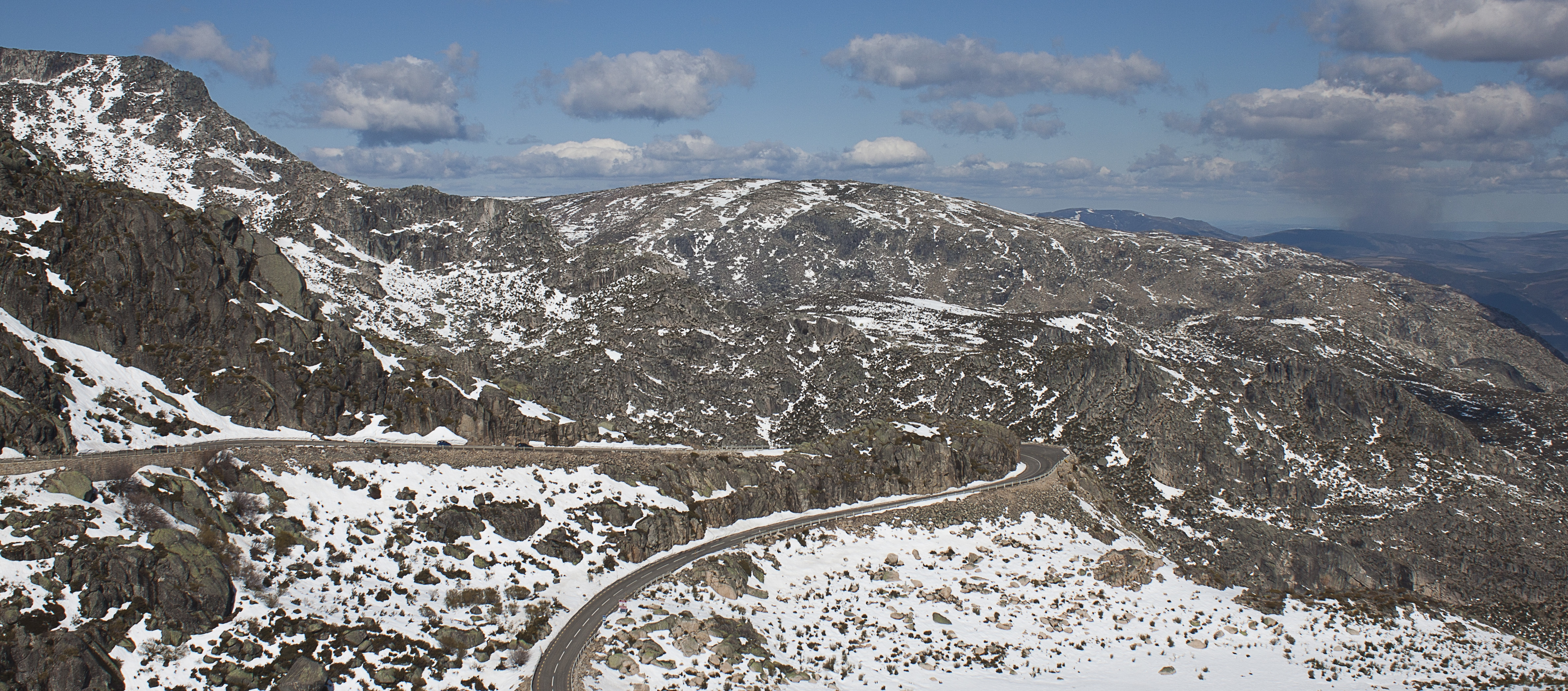
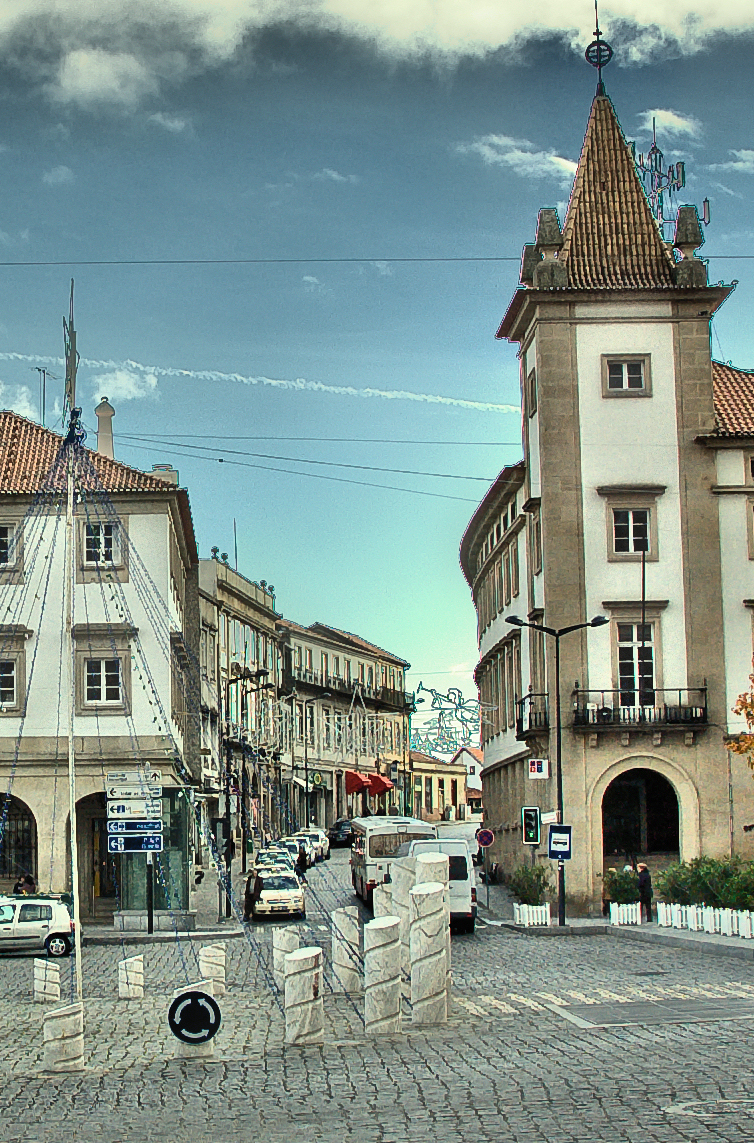
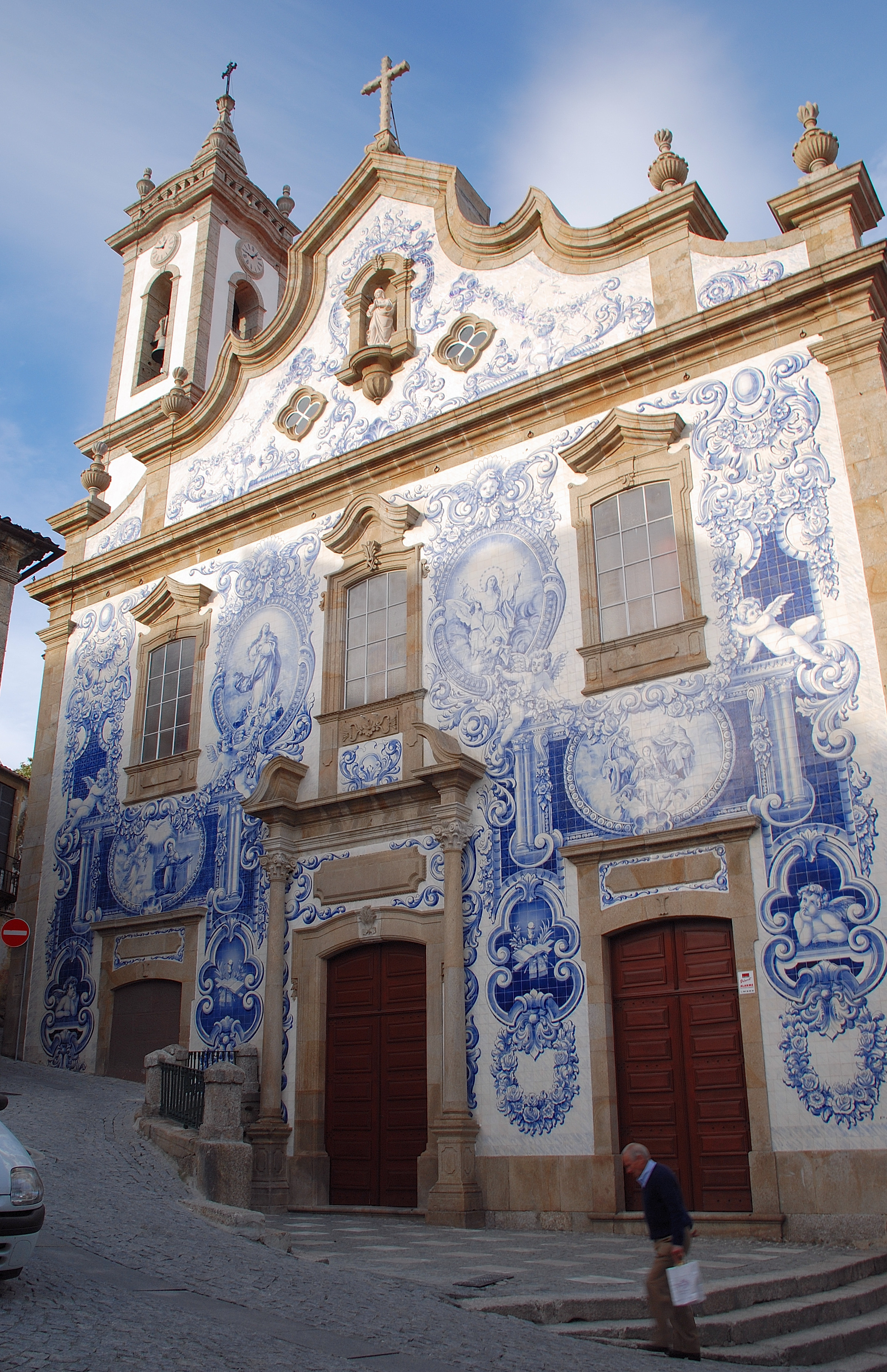
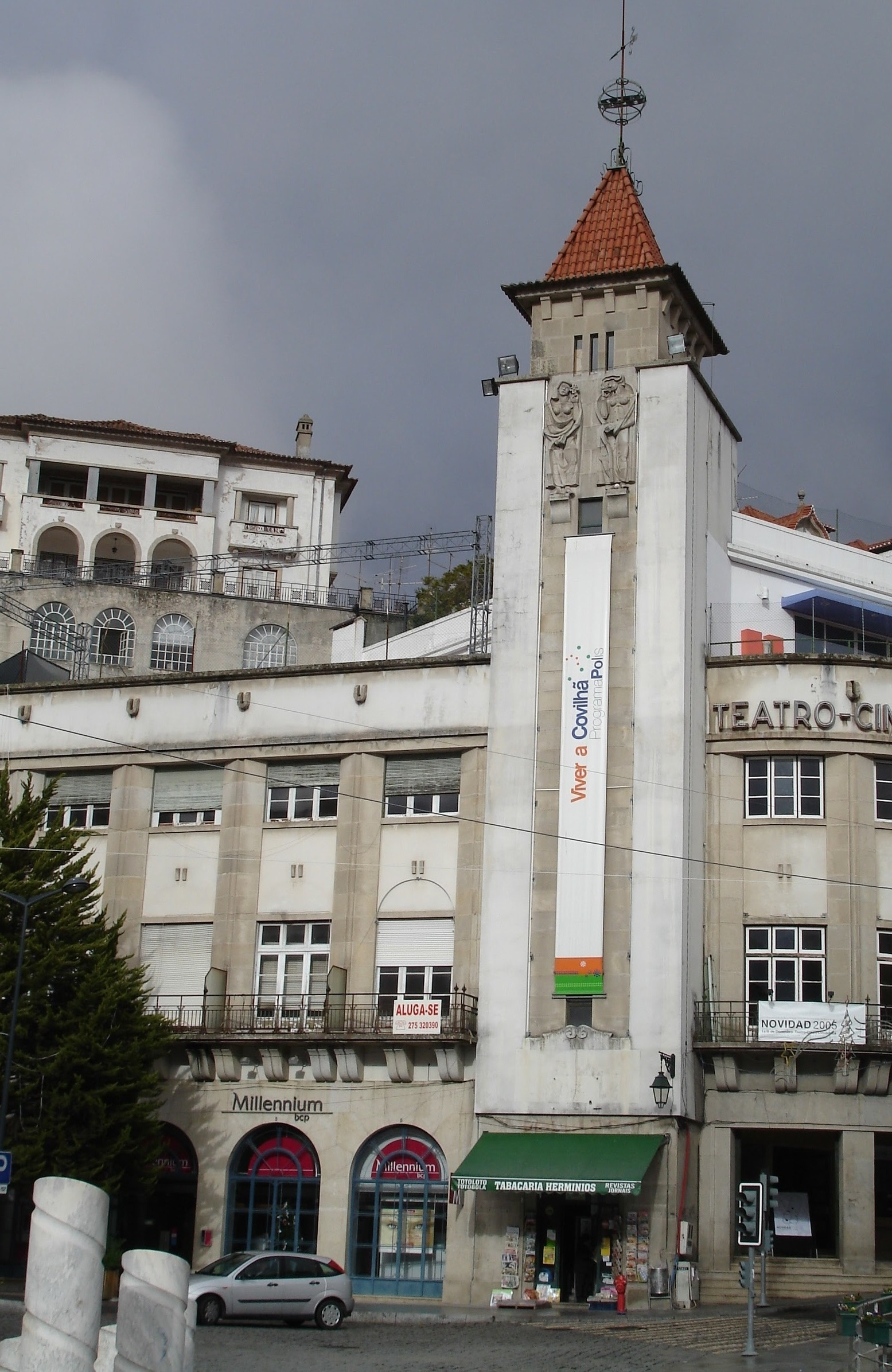
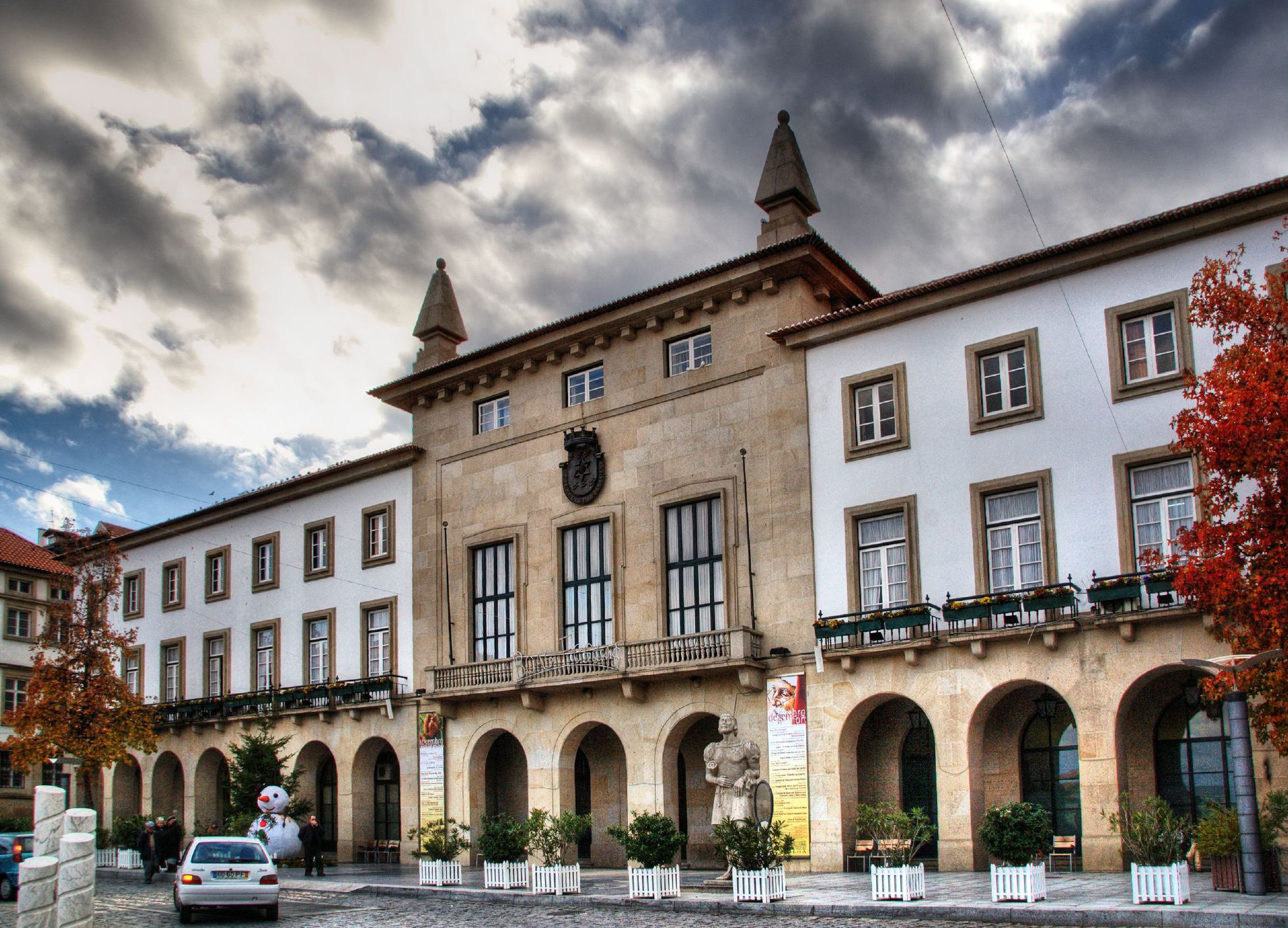
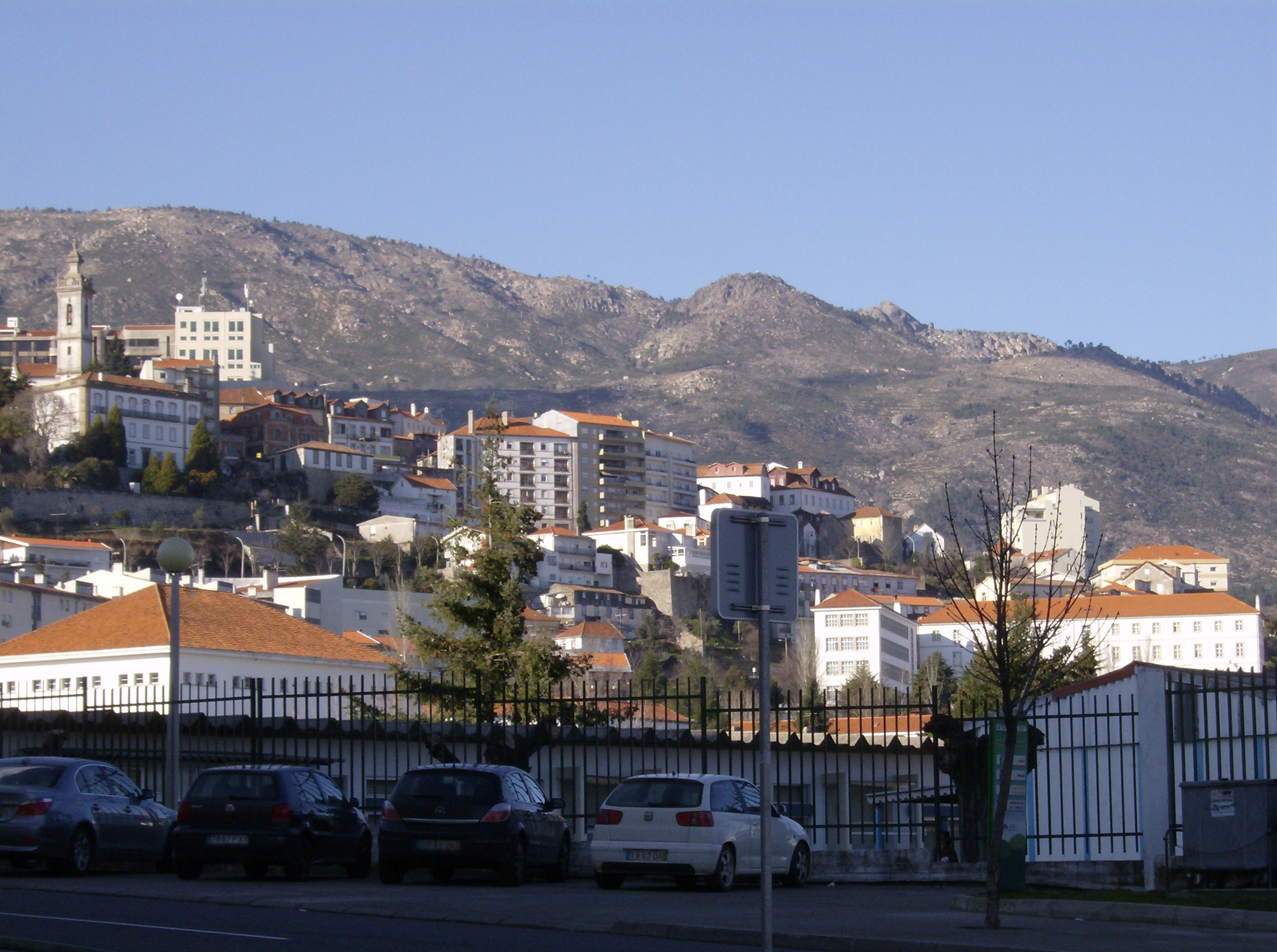

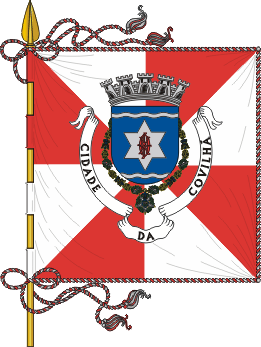
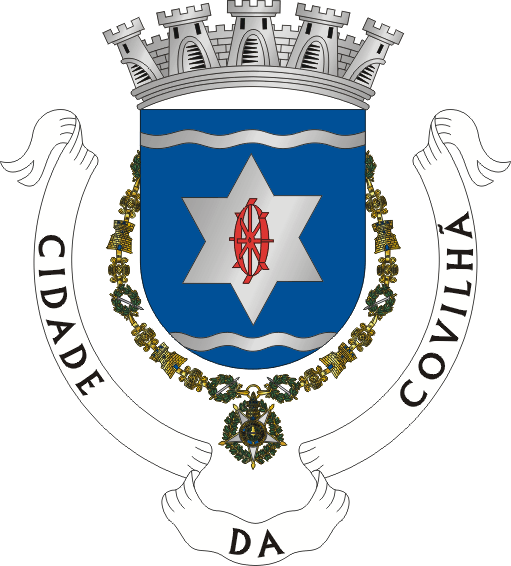
- Flag Coat of arms
- Interactive map of Covilhã
- Location in Portugal
- Coordinates: 40°17′N 7°30′W
- Country: Portugal
- Region: Centro
- Intermunic. comm.: Beiras e Serra da Estrela
- District: Castelo Branco
- Parishes: 21

Government
  - President: Vítor Manuel Pinheiro Pereira (PS)

Area
  - Total: 555.60 km^{2} (214.52 sq mi)

Population (2011)
  - Total: 51,797
  - Density: 93.227/km^{2} (241.46/sq mi)
- Time zone: UTC+00:00 (WET)
  - Summer (DST): UTC+01:00 (WEST)
- Local holiday: October 20
- Website: www.cm-covilha.pt

Covilhã (European Portuguese pronunciation: [kuviˈʎɐ̃]), officially City of Covilhã (Portuguese: Cidade da Covilhã), is a city and a municipality in the Centro region, Portugal. The city proper had 33,691 inhabitants in 2021. The municipality population in 2021 was 46,455 in an area of 555.60 square kilometres (214.52 mi^{2}). It is located in the Beiras e Serra da Estrela subregion and Beiras and Serra da Estrela Intermunicipal Community. The municipal holiday is October 20. Sometimes referred to as town of wool and snow, Covilhã is one of the main urban centres of the historical Beira Interior region. The proximity of the mountains offers dramatic scenery and a great environment for those fond of hiking, camping, mountain climbing and skiing. With an industrial tradition historically focused on textile industry supplied by an abundance of wool produced in the area since antiquity, but with a more diversified industry in contemporaneity, Covilhã, which was once known as the "Portuguese Manchester", is also a university city nowadays awarding degrees from aeronautical engineering to medicine to philosophy.

== History ==
Covilhã's history dates back to the days when it was a pre-historical settlement, a shelter for Lusitanian shepherds, and a Roman fortress known as Cava Juliana or Silia Hermínia. The region of Beira Interior, where the city of Covilhã is located, is rich in historical places. Due to its strategic potential, its mountains were used to build castles for both attack and defence purposes. Covilhã was granted foral in 1186 by king Sancho I of Portugal, who also built the castle walls. And, later, it was king Denis of Portugal who ordered the construction of the walls of the admirable medieval district of Portas do Sol. The old quarters of the city have narrow cobblestone streets; pedestrians are challenged permanently by the ups and downs of most of the streets in the city.

It was already in the Middle Ages one of the main "villages of the kingdom", a situation later confirmed by the fact that great natives from the city or its surroundings became decisive in all the great Portuguese Discoveries of the 15th and 16th centuries: the advance in the Atlantic Ocean, the sea route to India, the discoveries of America and Brazil, the first circumnavigation of the Earth. In full population expansion when the Renaissance appeared, the economic sector was particularly important in agriculture, pastoralism, fruit-growing, and forestry. Trade and industry were booming. Gil Vicente cites "the many fine cloths". The Infante D. Henrique, knowing this reality well, became "lord" of Covilhã. The Portuguese Discoveries required large sums of money. The people of the town and its council collaborated not only through taxes, but also with their capital and talent.

The expansion overseas started with the conquest of Ceuta in 1415. Covilhã personalities such as Frei Diogo Alves da Cunha, who is buried in the Church of Conceição, participated in the event. The presence of ‘’covilhanenses’’ in the whole process extends with Pêro da Covilhã (first Portuguese to set foot on land in Mozambique and who sent news to D. João II on how to reach the places where the spices were produced, preparing the Maritime Way to India), João Ramalho, Fernão Penteado and others.

Among the missionaries we find Francisco Álvares, killed on the way to Brazil; Pêro da Covilhã, chaplain in Vasco da Gama’s expedition to India, the first martyr of India; Father Francisco Cabral, missionary in Japan; Father Gaspar Pais, who left Goa for Abyssinia; and many others who took, along with their faith, the name of Covilhã and Fundão in Cova da Beira valley to all parts of the world. The brothers Rui Faleiro and Francisco Faleiro, cosmographers, became notable for their knowledge of nautical science. During renaissance is Friar Heitor Pinto, one of the first Portuguese to publicly defend the Portuguese identity. His literary work is expressed in the classic "Image of Christian Life".

The importance of Covilhã, in this period, is explained not only by the "notable" title granted to it by king D. Sebastião but also by the works carried out here and in the region by the Castilian kings during the time of the Iberian Union. The Town Hall Square was indeed until the end of the 20th century, of Spanish Philippine style. In the surrounding streets one can find several traces of this style. In the municipality as well. Examples of Manueline style can also be found in the city. This is the case of a Manueline window in the Jewish quarter in Rua das Flores. The architect Mateus Fernandes, from Covilhã, who designed the entrance door to the Imperfect Chapels in the Monastery of Batalha is also other notable personality from Covilhã.

The two streams that come down from the Serra da Estrela, Carpinteira and Degoldra, cross the urban center and were at the origin of the industrial development. They provided the hydraulic energy that allowed the factories to work. Next to these two streams, today an interesting industrial archaeological site can be seen, composed of dozens of ruined buildings. A school-factory was built by Fernando de Meneses, 2nd Count of Ericeira in 1681. On November 1, 1755, Covilhã was shaken by the forces of the 1755 Lisbon earthquake that destroyed part of Covilhã's castle walls and its large towers.

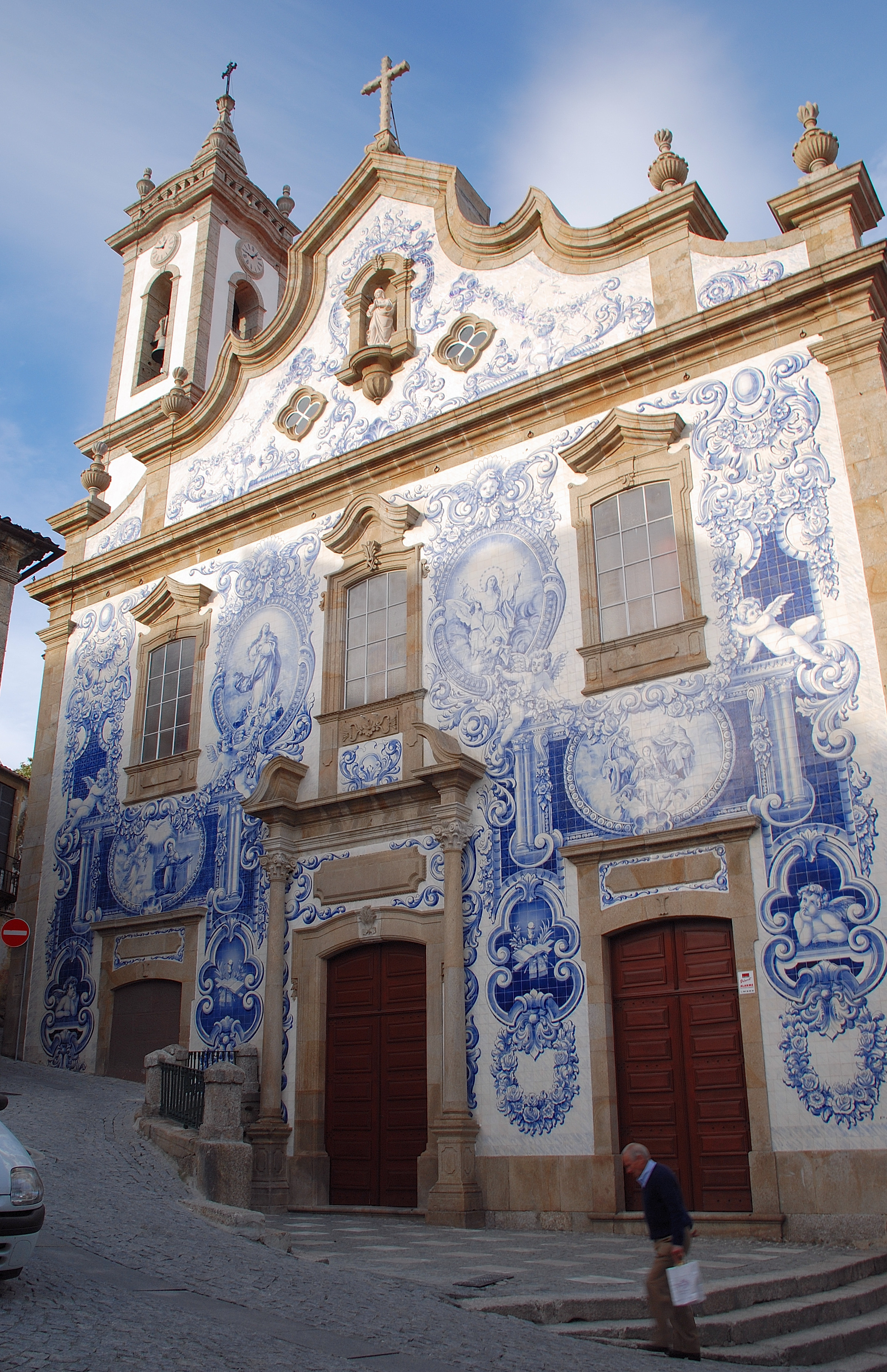
Santa Maria Church in Covilhã, built in the 19th century. In the 1940s the façade was covered with tiles (azulejos).

A Royal Textile Factory was established in the city by the Marquis of Pombal in 1763, and Covilhã was granted city status on 20 October 1870 by king Luís I. Along the two streams that cross the city there are still remains of the old textile factories, which bear witness to the unquestionable importance of this industry for Covilhã's economy, once known as the "Portuguese Manchester". The Panasqueira mines in the municipality of Covilhã started production in 1898 and at the time of World War II, about 10,000 people worked in there.

During the first half of the 19th century, the municipality of Covilhã had about 22,000 inhabitants, and in 1930 it nearly reached 50,000 inhabitants. During the 1960s, Covilhã's municipality surpassed 70,000 inhabitants, but the Portuguese Colonial War (1961–1974) and the generalized emigration phenomena of the 1960s to 1980s Portuguese society, its geographical location in the mountainous interior of central Portugal, increasing mechanization, and the stagnation of its textile industrial sector caused a period of decline of its population to nearly 50,000 in the 1990s. A state-run university, UBI - Universidade da Beira Interior, was founded in 1979. The city is still expanding, mainly to the flat part of the valley, called Cova da Beira, where some important infrastructure, such as the central hospital and the highway, are located.

== Geography ==
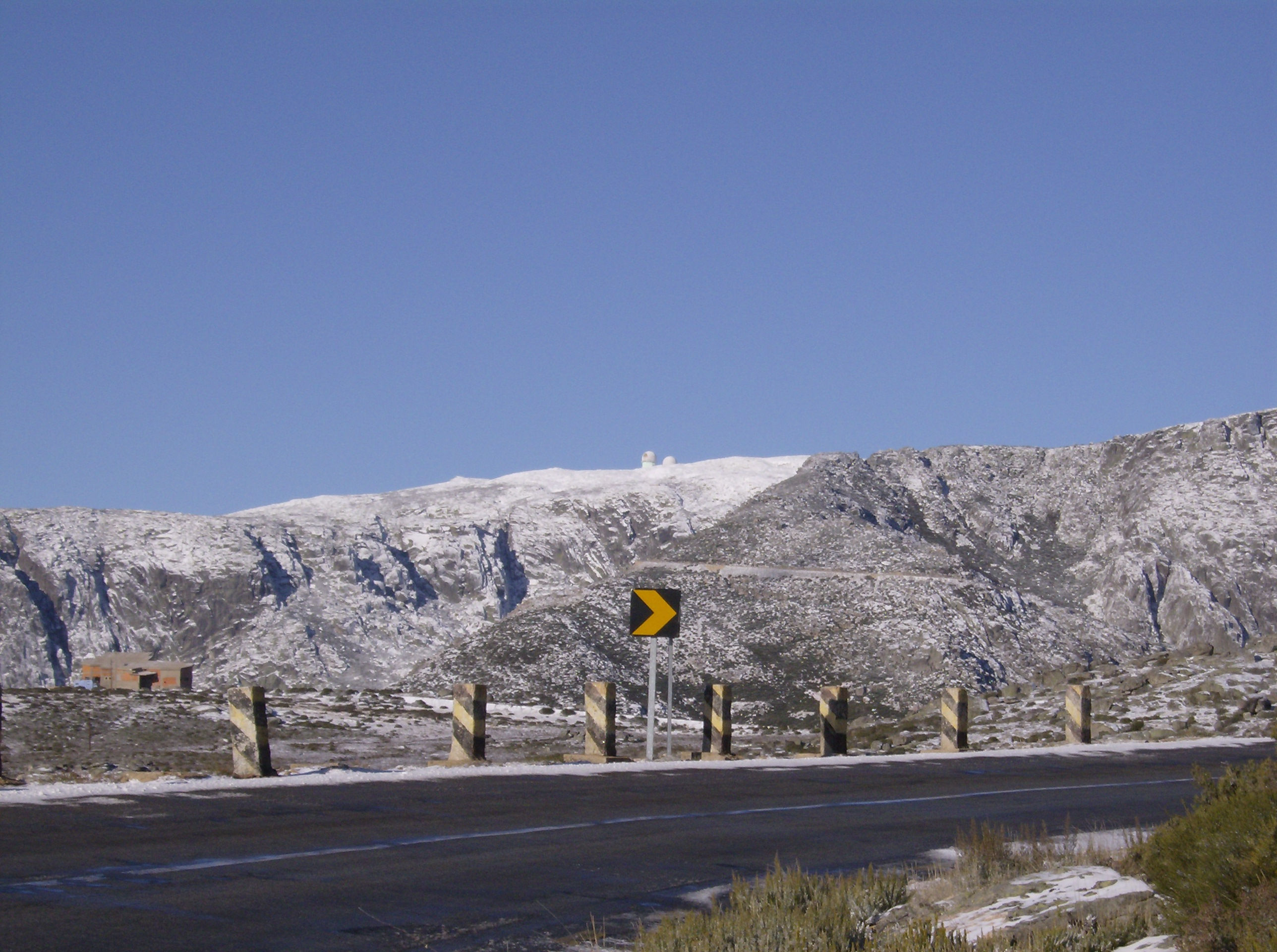
Torre, the highest point of Mainland Portugal, viewed from Penhas da Saúde

Covilhã is located in the Centro region, Cova da Beira subregion, in central Portugal; 300 km (186 mi) Northeast of Lisbon, Portugal's capital; 100 km (62 mi) East of Coimbra, the regional administrative centre; and at the bottom of the highest Portuguese mountain range, Serra da Estrela.

The city of Castelo Branco is located 50 km (31 mi) to the south of Covilhã and the neighboring city of Fundão, the largest locality in the vicinities of Covilhã, is 20 km (12.4 mi) also to the south.

The city of Covilhã towers between 450 and 800 metres (1,476 and 2,624 feet) above the sea level, thus the mountain landscape is ever present. The larger municipality has 555.6 km^{2} (214.5 sq mi) of territory and includes several localities distributed across 31 civil parishes.

In the municipality of Covilhã but outside the urban area, Penhas da Saúde is one of its highest points. At 1,500 metres (4,821 ft) high, this village and winter resort is located within the Serra da Estrela Natural Park.

== Climate ==
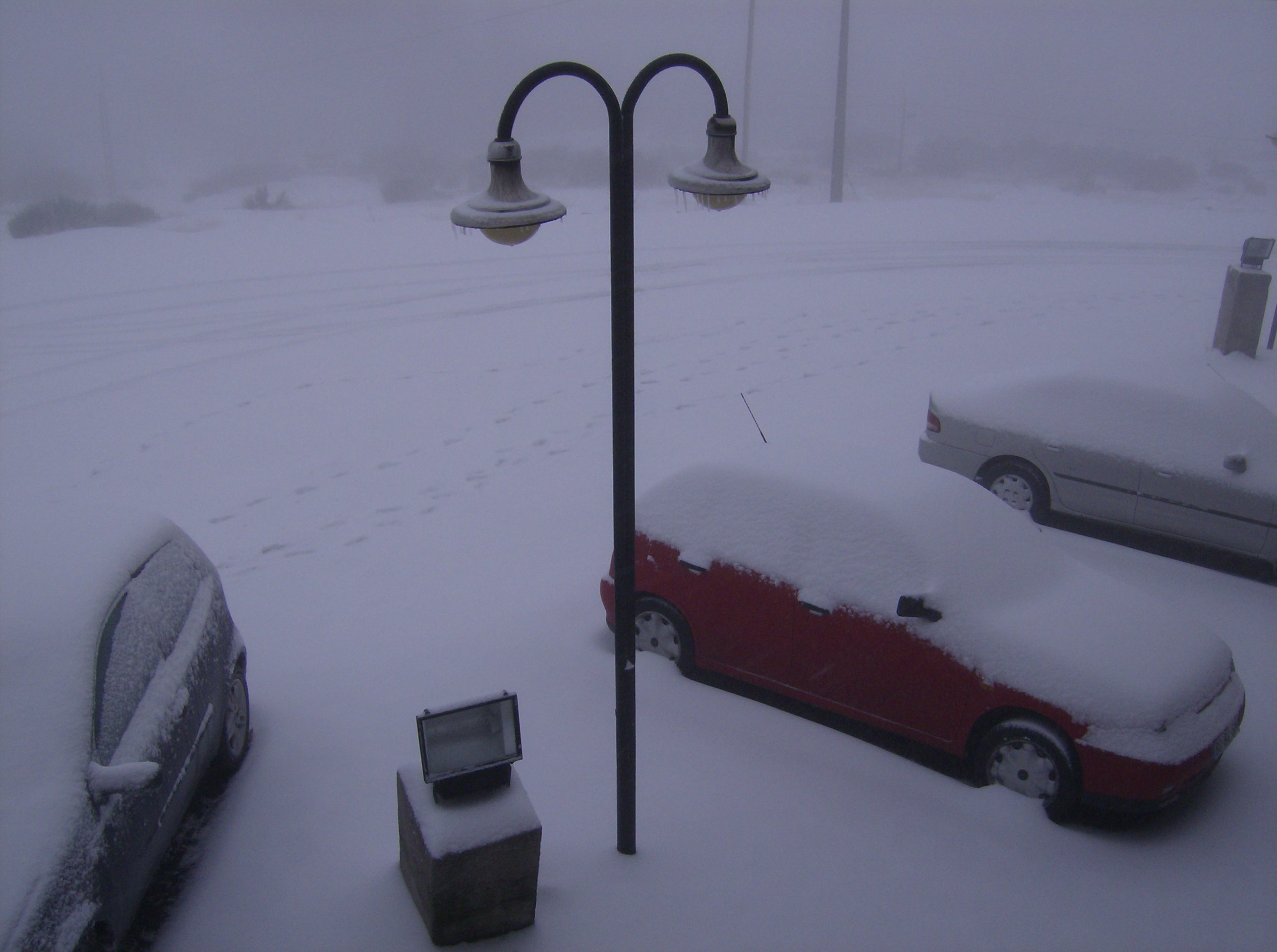
Blizzard in Penhas da Saúde, January 2007.

Covilhã has a Mediterranean climate (Csa, according to the Köppen climate classification), moderately cold in the winter, and relatively warm in the summer. The Serra da Estrela Ski Resort, the only one in Portugal, lies about 20 km (12.4 mi) away from the city, already in the neighbouring municipality of Seia.

The cold increases according to altitude, varying from higher temperatures in the lower parts of the municipality, to colder temperatures with frequent and sometimes abundant snowfalls during the cold months in the higher areas, such as Penhas da Saúde, above 1,500 meters of altitude, 9 km away from the highest point of mainland Portugal, the Torre Plateau. In the urban area of Covilhã snowfalls with accumulation are rare.

The hottest month is August, with an average temperature of 22.2 °C (72.0 °F), while the coldest month is January, with an average of 6.2 °C (43.2 °F). The average annual temperature of Covilhã is 13.6 °C (56.5 °F) and the average annual rainfall is around 1,500 millimetres (59 in).

Climate data for Covilhã, Portugal, precipitation 1985-2021, altitude: 719 m (2,359 ft)
Month	Jan	Feb	Mar	Apr	May	Jun	Jul	Aug	Sep	Oct	Nov	Dec	Year
Mean daily maximum °C (°F)	9.4 (48.9)	11.2 (52.2)	13.5 (56.3)	16.4 (61.5)	19.2 (66.6)	24.7 (76.5)	28.1 (82.6)	28.4 (83.1)	24.4 (75.9)	18.9 (66.0)	13.1 (55.6)	9.8 (49.6)	18.1 (64.6)
Daily mean °C (°F)	6.2 (43.2)	7.4 (45.3)	9.5 (49.1)	11.8 (53.2)	14.3 (57.7)	19.1 (66.4)	21.9 (71.4)	22.2 (72.0)	19.1 (66.4)	14.7 (58.5)	9.7 (49.5)	6.7 (44.1)	13.6 (56.4)
Mean daily minimum °C (°F)	3.1 (37.6)	3.6 (38.5)	5.6 (42.1)	7.2 (45.0)	9.5 (49.1)	13.5 (56.3)	15.7 (60.3)	16.0 (60.8)	13.9 (57.0)	10.5 (50.9)	6.3 (43.3)	3.6 (38.5)	9.0 (48.3)
Average precipitation mm (inches)	209.7 (8.26)	156.4 (6.16)	116.3 (4.58)	123.8 (4.87)	84.5 (3.33)	32.7 (1.29)	8.3 (0.33)	17.8 (0.70)	59.3 (2.33)	198.6 (7.82)	217.3 (8.56)	238.5 (9.39)	1,463.2 (57.62)
Source 1: Climate-data.org
Source 2: Portuguese Environment Agency (precipitation)

Climate data for Penhas da Saúde, Portugal altitude: 1,606 m (5,269 ft)
Month	Jan	Feb	Mar	Apr	May	Jun	Jul	Aug	Sep	Oct	Nov	Dec	Year
Mean daily maximum °C (°F)	4.4 (39.9)	5.0 (41.0)	6.4 (43.5)	8.8 (47.8)	11.5 (52.7)	17.2 (63.0)	20.8 (69.4)	21.1 (70.0)	17.3 (63.1)	12.1 (53.8)	7.1 (44.8)	4.8 (40.6)	11.4 (52.5)
Daily mean °C (°F)	1.6 (34.9)	2.0 (35.6)	3.2 (37.8)	5.2 (41.4)	7.8 (46.0)	12.9 (55.2)	16.1 (61.0)	16.5 (61.7)	13.3 (55.9)	8.9 (48.0)	4.3 (39.7)	2.1 (35.8)	7.8 (46.1)
Mean daily minimum °C (°F)	−1.1 (30.0)	−1.0 (30.2)	0.1 (32.2)	1.7 (35.1)	4.1 (39.4)	8.7 (47.7)	11.4 (52.5)	11.9 (53.4)	9.4 (48.9)	5.8 (42.4)	1.5 (34.7)	−0.6 (30.9)	4.3 (39.8)
Average precipitation mm (inches)	261 (10.3)	237 (9.3)	182 (7.2)	131 (5.2)	116 (4.6)	83 (3.3)	22 (0.9)	18 (0.7)	67 (2.6)	161 (6.3)	234 (9.2)	198 (7.8)	1,710 (67.4)
Source: Climate-data.org

== Parishes ==
Administratively, the municipality is divided into 21 civil parishes (freguesias):

- Aldeia de São Francisco de Assis
- Barco e Coutada
- Boidobra
- Cantar-Galo e Vila do Carvalho
- Casegas e Ourondo
- Cortes do Meio
- Covilhã e Canhoso
- Dominguizo
- Erada
- Ferro
- Orjais
- Paul
- Peraboa
- Peso e Vales do Rio
- São Jorge da Beira
- Sobral de São Miguel
- Teixoso e Sarzedo
- Tortosendo
- Unhais da Serra
- Vale Formoso e Aldeia do Souto
- Verdelhos

== Education ==
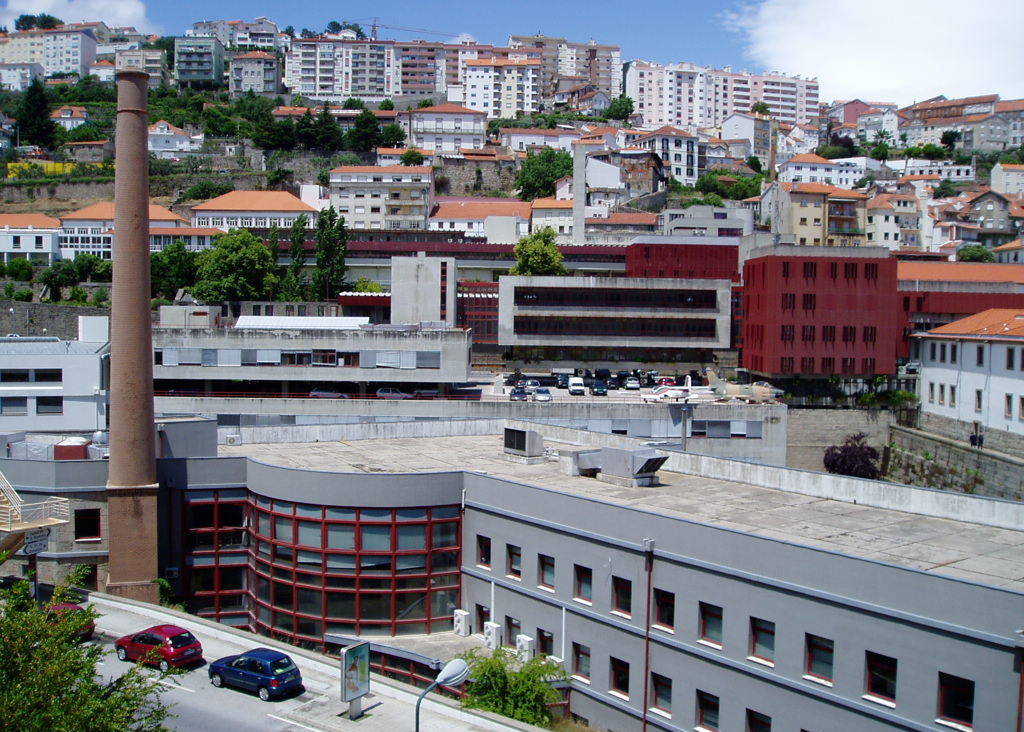
A view of the University of Beira Interior

The municipality of Covilhã has several kindergartens for pre-school children between 3 and 6 years of age, and 3 primary education schools. It has also a number of 2nd and 3rd cycle basic and secondary schools: Escola Secundária Frei Heitor Pinto, Escola Básica dos 2º e 3º ciclos de Tortosendo, Escola Básica Integrada de Sao Domingos, Escola Básica dos 2º e 3º ciclos de Paúl, Escola Básica do 2º ciclo de Pêro da Covilhã, Escola Secundária Campos Melo, Escola Secundária Quinta das Palmeiras, Escola Básica dos 2º e 3º ciclos de Teixoso, Externato de Nossa Senhora dos Remédios and Escola Internacional da Covilhã. Covilhã has a public university - the University of Beira Interior (UBI), which was founded in 1979 and awards all university academic degrees (licentiate "licenciatura", master's and doctorate degrees) in several fields like medicine, mathematics, sports sciences, aeronautical engineering, industrial design, fashion design, cinema, psychology, and many others.

== Economy ==
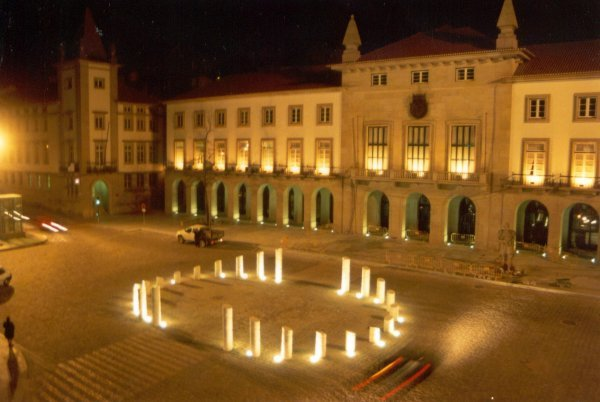
Covilhã City Hall.

Major economic activities in the region include textiles, food production, agriculture, tourism and mining. The Panasqueira mines in the municipality of Covilhã, located over 30 kilometers to southwest of the city, is a large tin-tungsten mine made up of multiple concessions that started production in 1898. The industrial mining center commonly known as Panasqueira Mines extends over a vast area covered by the Panasqueira and Vale da Ermida Mining Fields with a total area around 20.5 km2. There is an estimated 12,000 km of tunnels, some still working and others already abandoned. At the time of World War II, about 10,000 people worked in the mine; by 2017, approximately 370. The mine had a planned production for more than 30 years as of 2017. The University of Beira Interior, established in 1979, has great importance in the city today. The Centro Hospitalar Universitário Cova da Beira at Covilhã, a state-run university hospital, plays a major role in the region. Covilhã is traditionally a center of wool and textile industries - the university's central building was the Royal Textile Factory, established by the Marquis of Pombal in the 18th century. Covilhã has deep industrial roots and is still one of the biggest woolen fabric producers in Europe.

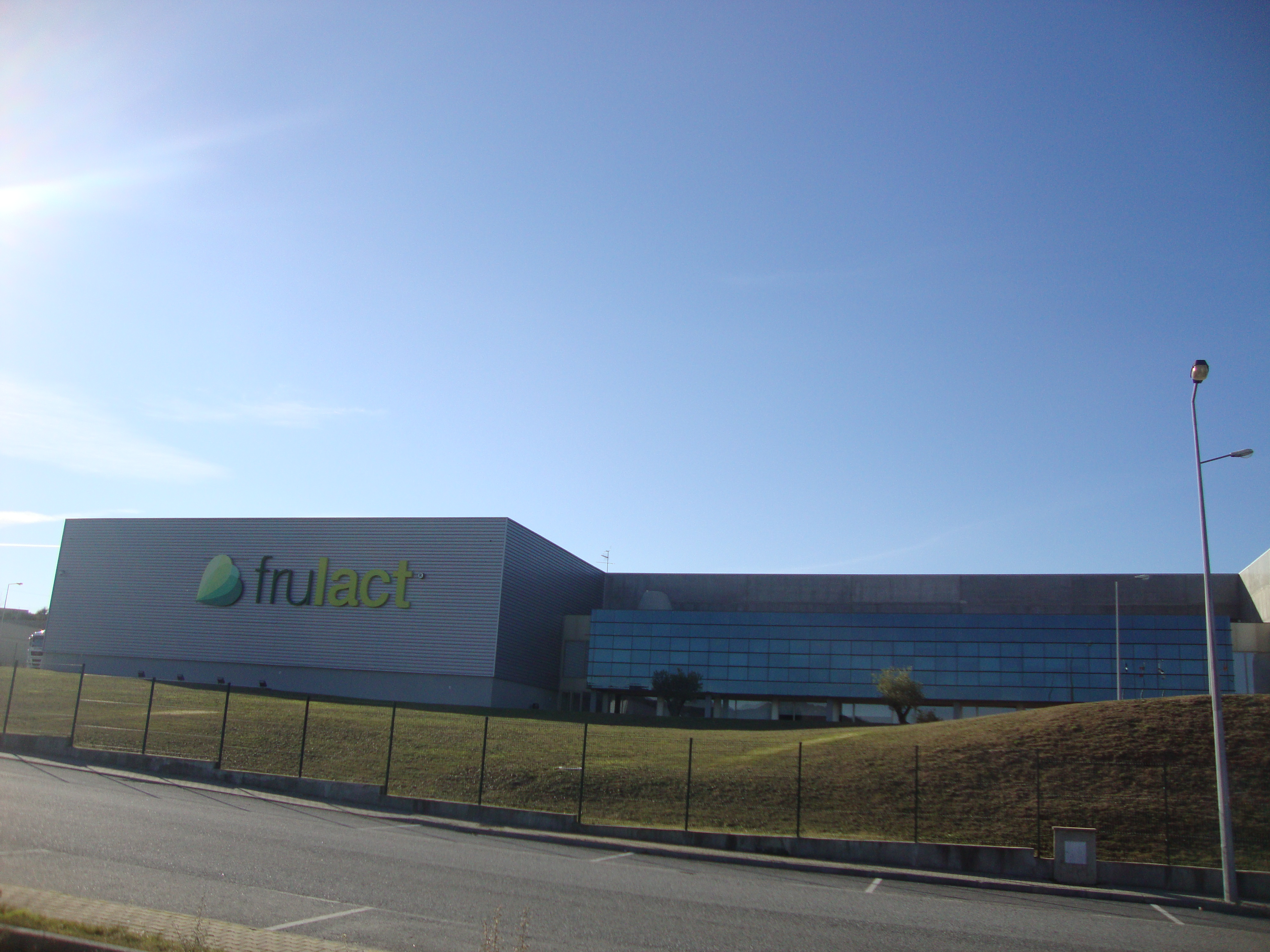
A manufacturing plant of Frulact in Covilhã Municipality.

The textile industry produces about 40,000 km of fabric per year, mainly through companies like Paulo de Oliveira, Penteadora, Tessimax and A. Saraiva, which supply large worldwide textile and fashion brands such as Hugo Boss, Armani, Zegna, Marks & Spencer, Yves St. Laurent, Calvin Klein and Christian Dior.

Tourism is also important, and the city serves as a winter and mountain resort. Fruit production is important in the region of Cova da Beira, a subregion centered in Covilhã's municipality. Frulact, a Portuguese fruit processing company, has major industrial facilities in the municipality of Covilhã.

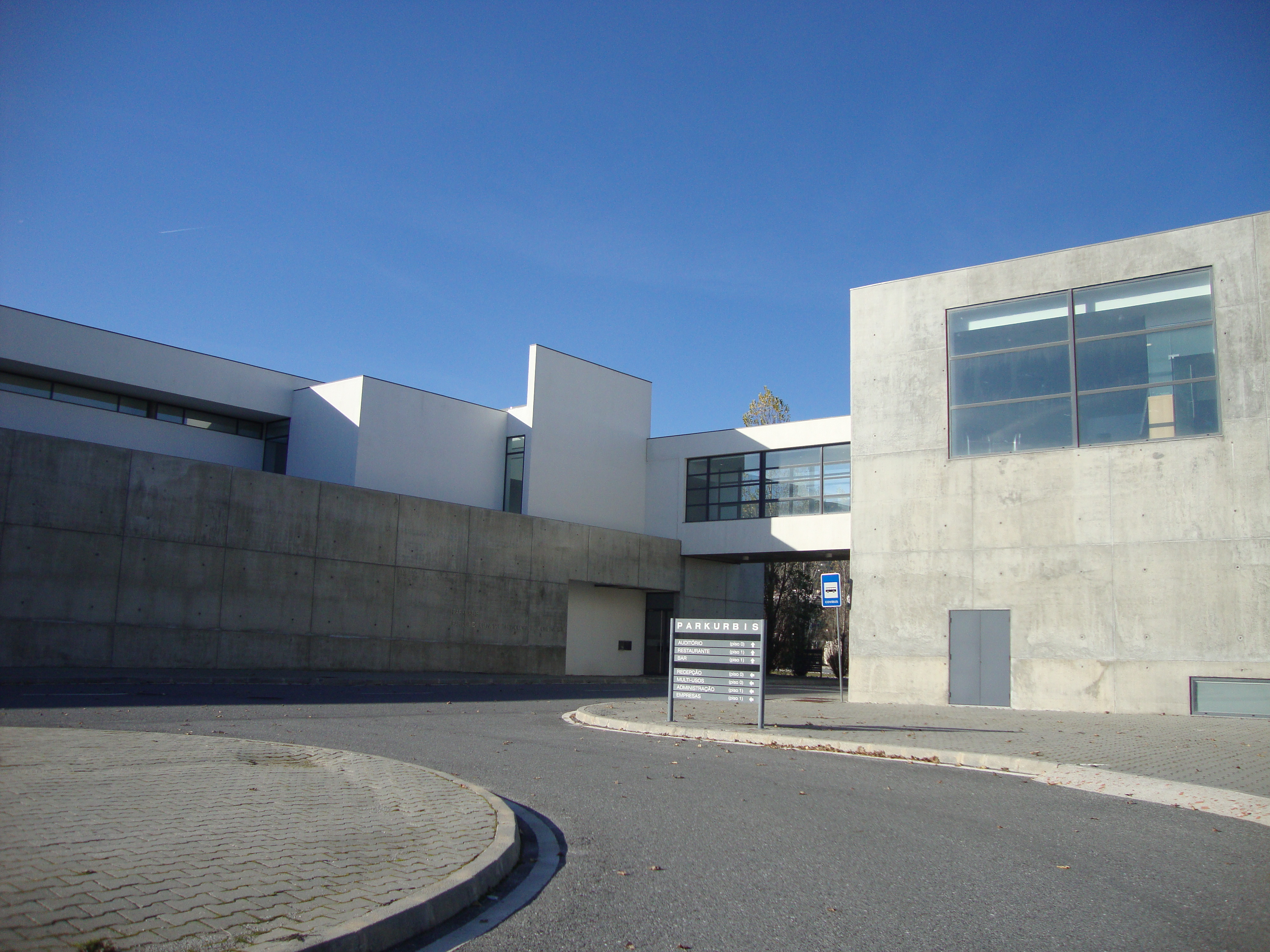
The Parkurbis is a science park which has attracted new businesses to Covilhã.

The city has a science park, Parkurbis, which has attracted several new businesses to the area. There is a large shopping centre in Covilhã, Serra Shopping, and besides a wide variety of shops, it has hypermarket, four cinemas and many restaurants. Hypermarkets and supermarkets located in the lower part of the town include Continente (inside Serra Shopping), Intermarché, Pingo Doce, and Lidl. The Public Market (Mercado Municipal) is another option and an opportunity to buy fresh produce directly from the producers. Covilhã hosts one of the biggest data centres in Europe, with the capacity to store 30 petabytes of information at onset. The building, which belongs to Altice, opened in September 2013 and has a floor area the size of 13 football pitches.

== Culture ==
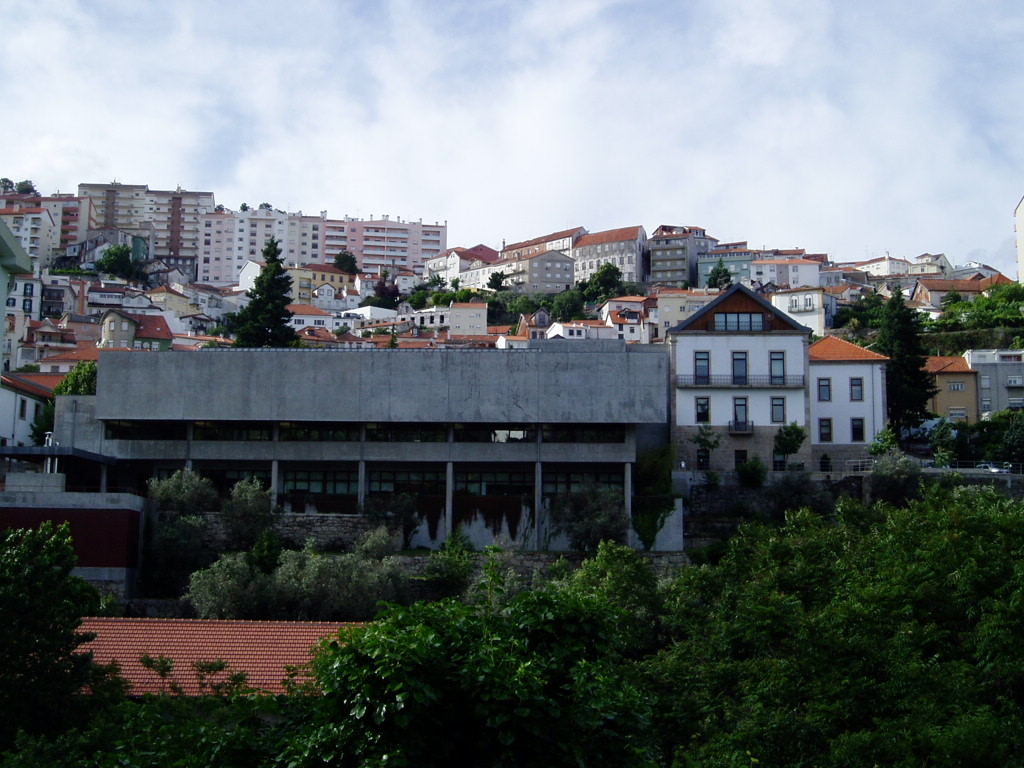
A view of Covilhã with the University of Beira Interior main library in the foreground

The City Hall of Covilhã is responsible for the cultural programming of one of the movie theatres of the town which has a wide variety of activities throughout the year. This theatre, called Teatro Municipal da Covilhã, was closed until 2021 when it was reopened in November.

== Cuisine ==
The cuisine of Covilhã is influenced by those of Serra da Estrela and the Cova da Beira.

Lamb, goat meat and river trout dishes, rice with carqueja (Genista tridentata), a variety of cold meats (including chouriço and presunto), morcela, honey from Serra da Estrela Natural Park, local requeijão, the internationally acclaimed Serra da Estrela Cheese, peach, apple, chestnut, cherries and berries, are typical locally sourced ingredients and products used in Covilhã's traditional cuisine.

The pastel de molho, a typical pastry of Covilhã made with a meat-based core and a saffron-based sauce, is regarded as the city's gastronomic delicacy.

Cherovia (Pastinaca sativa), informally described as a type of white carrot, is also a typical food in and around Covilhã.

== Sport ==
The city has indoor swimming pools and there are also rivers and lakes where swimming is allowed. Facilities for horse riding and karting are also available. The mountain range has excellent conditions for mountain bike, trekking, climbing, skiing and snowboarding. There are tracks with artificial snow that are open all year. There are several gyms offering various services such as sauna, fitness, martial arts, and yoga.

Sporting Clube da Covilhã, a sports club founded in 1923 in Covilhã, is the most important sporting organization in the city. Its football (soccer) team now plays in the secondary national divisions, but in the past played in the top division. It is one of the few clubs of Portugal's interior to have played in the top division of Portuguese football. This football team plays in the Estádio Municipal José dos Santos Pinto, a stadium opened in 1935 which is owned by the City Hall and is located in the higher part of the city at 1,200 meters above sea level. The City Hall is also the owner of a newer sports complex with a stadium and athletics track located in the lower part of the city and inaugurated in 2003 - it is the Complexo Desportivo da Covilhã.

== Transport ==
The nearest airports are located in Lisbon and Porto. From these two cities, Covilhã can be very easily reached both by train and bus. The railway and bus stations of Covilhã are within a walking distance from one to the other (10 minutes walk). It is also possible to reach Covilhã directly by bus from abroad.

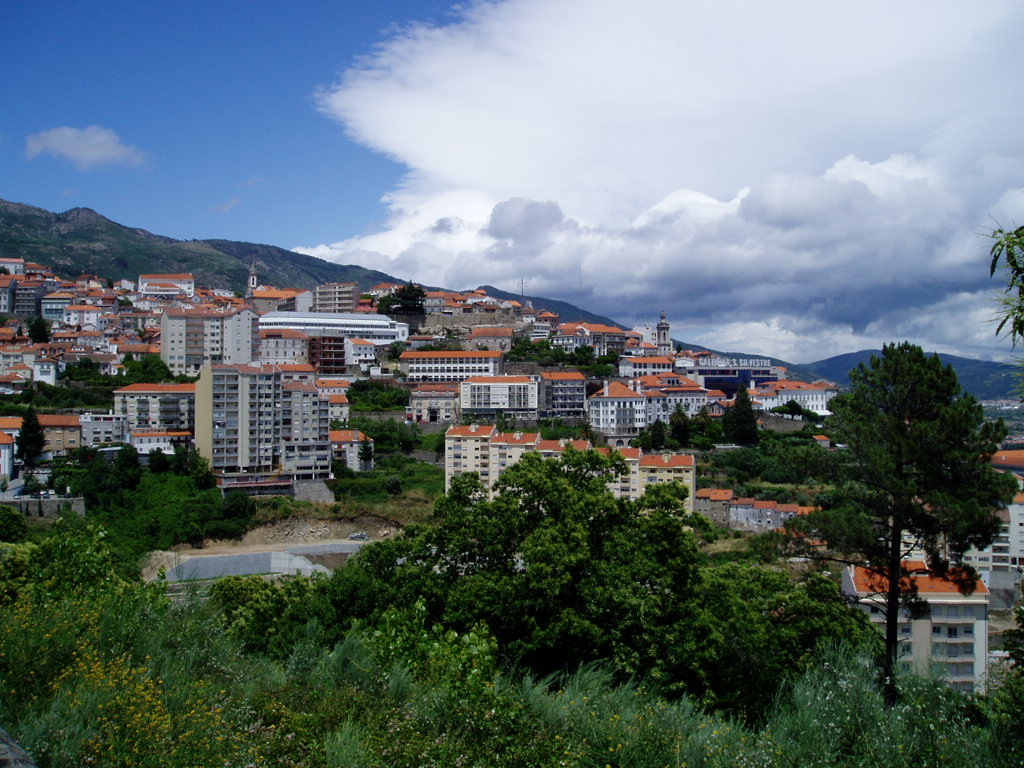
Partial view of Covilhã's core centre with the mountains in the background

Covilhã is located, less than 300 km from Lisbon and Porto, the two biggest cities in Portugal and just 400 km from the Spanish capital, Madrid. Several national and international bus routes pass Covilhã, so it is easy and practical to reach almost all destinations. To reach Lisbon takes 3.5-4h by bus or by train. The bus station is situated in the lower part of the city; and the railway station is near, no more than 10 minutes walking. The railway company, CP (Caminhos de Ferro Portugueses), offers various types of services. An InterCity (Intercidades) train is recommended to reach Covilhã. There are also car rental companies in the city.

From Covilhã northwards to Guarda trains were operated by diesel motorcars. This scenic stretch of mountainous rural line provides the strategic last leg of the Beira Baixa Railway linking it to Guarda via Belmonte. However, for twelve years it was closed for modernisation and electrification. The works, originally due for completion in 2011, were finally completed permitting reopening of the 46 km line to Guarda in May 2021 after serious funding issues due to the weakness of the Portuguese economy.

A bus network – Transportes Urbanos da Covilhã – covers the entire urban area as well as the outskirts of the city, making it easy to travel both within and outside the city limits, although the buses are infrequent (not less than 1 hour between buses). Several bus lines serve university buildings. Cabs are also an option. They are painted cream (mostly black these days) and sometimes have a roof-light to identify them. In town they use taximeters, but once outside urban boundaries the service is charged per km.

== Notable residents ==
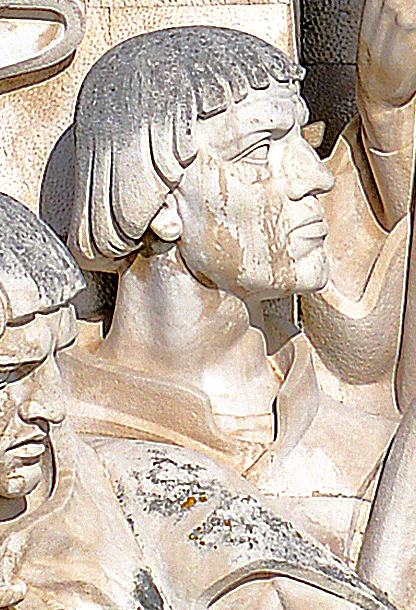
Pêro da Covilhã

- Pêro da Covilhã (ca.1460 – after 1526), a Portuguese diplomat and explorer.
- Mateus Fernandes (15C - 1515) a Portuguese architect, worked in the Manueline style
- Rui Faleiro (late 15C - 16C) Portuguese cosmographer, astrologer and astronomer who was the principal scientific organizer behind Ferdinand Magellan's circumnavigation of the world.
- José Sócrates (born 1957) brought up in Covilhã, Prime Minister of Portugal 2005 to 2011, accused in 2014 of corruption, tax evasion and money laundering, on going trial.
- Eugénia Melo e Castro (born 1958) a Portuguese singer-songwriter.
- Adolfo Mesquita Nunes (born 1977) a Portuguese jurist and politician
- Miguel Gonçalves Mendes (born 1978) a Portuguese film director, screenwriter and producer.

=== Sport ===
- Jim Aldred (born 1963), Canadian expatriate and coach of the Portugal men's national ice hockey team
- César Brito (born 1964) a retired footballer with 260 club caps and 14 for Portugal
- Hélder Godinho (born 1977) a former footballer with 291 club caps
- João Real (born 1983) a Portuguese former footballer with 313 club caps
- Renato Margaça (born 1985) a retired footballer with over 400 club caps and 21 for Cyprus
- Nuno Coelho (born 1987) a retired footballer with over 430 club caps
- Sérgio Paulico (born 1991), footballer

== Politics ==
The present mayor is Vitor Manuel Pinheiro Pereira, elected by the Socialist Party.

== International Relations ==
Covilhã is twinned with:

- Trelew, Argentina
- Berstett, France
- Roubaix, France
- Santarém, Portugal
- Oeiras, Portugal
- Madalena, Portugal
- (Timor-Leste) Laleia, East Timor
- Praia, Cape Verde

== Gallery ==
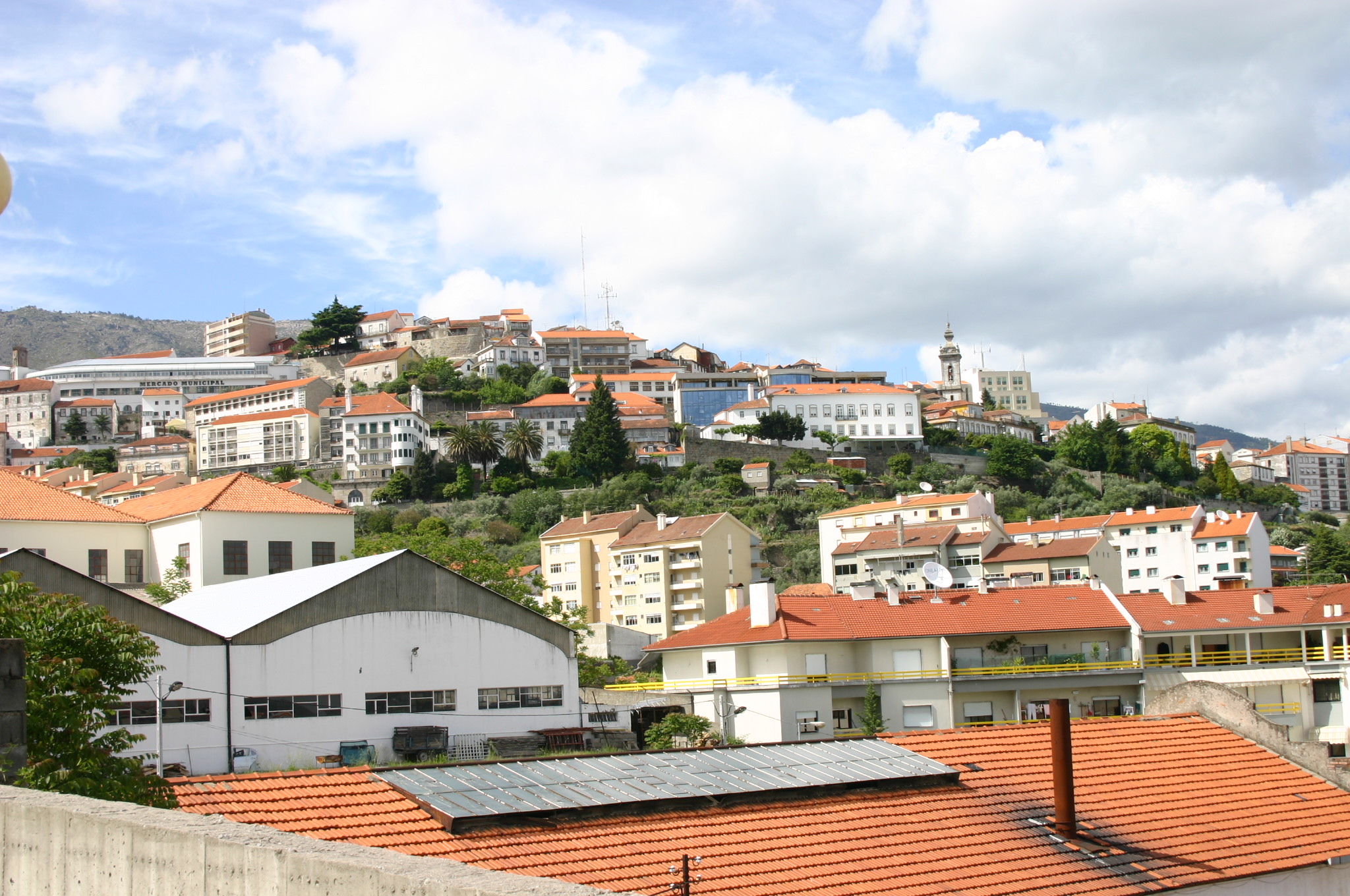
View of Covilhã

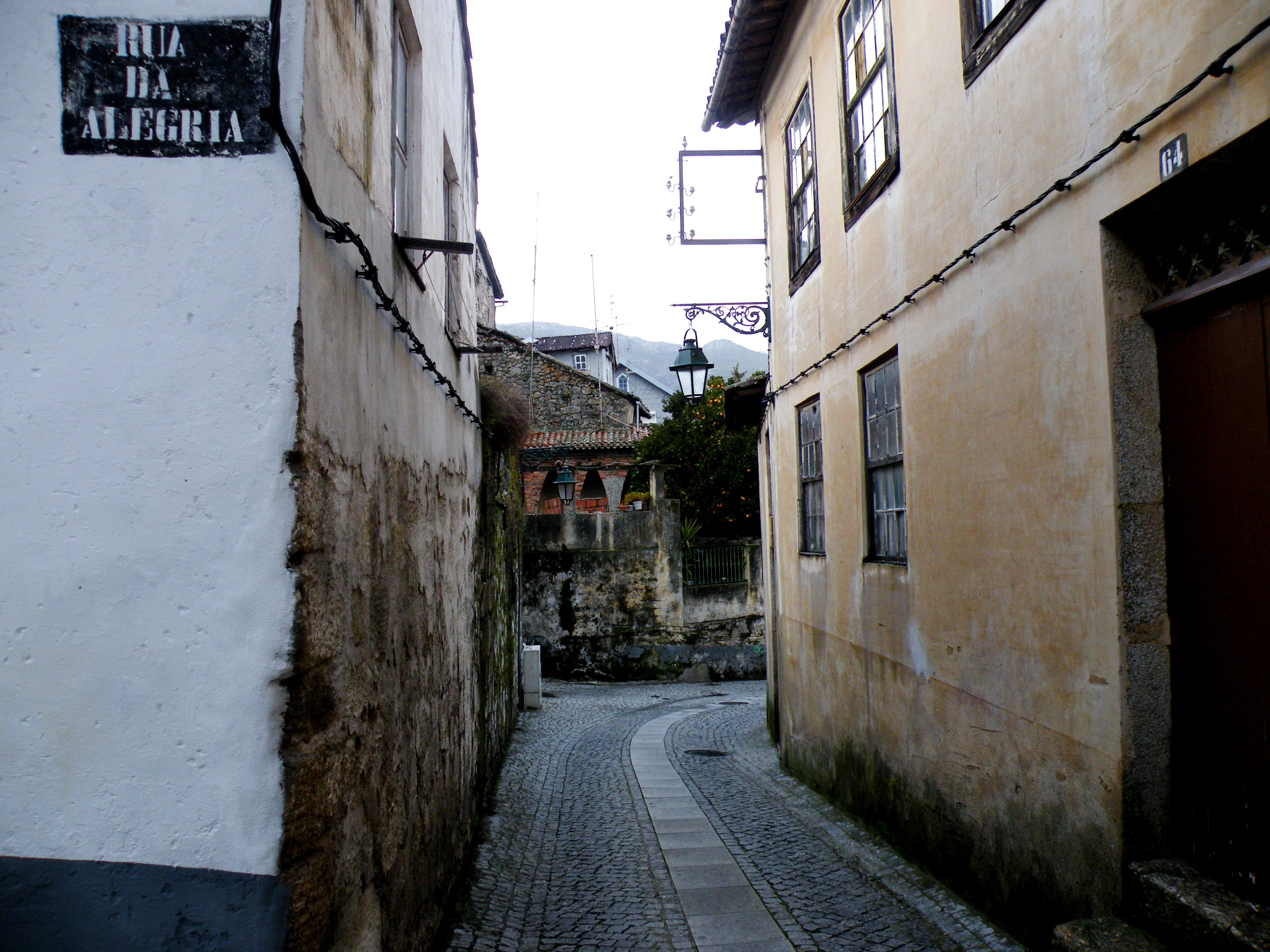
Old paved street

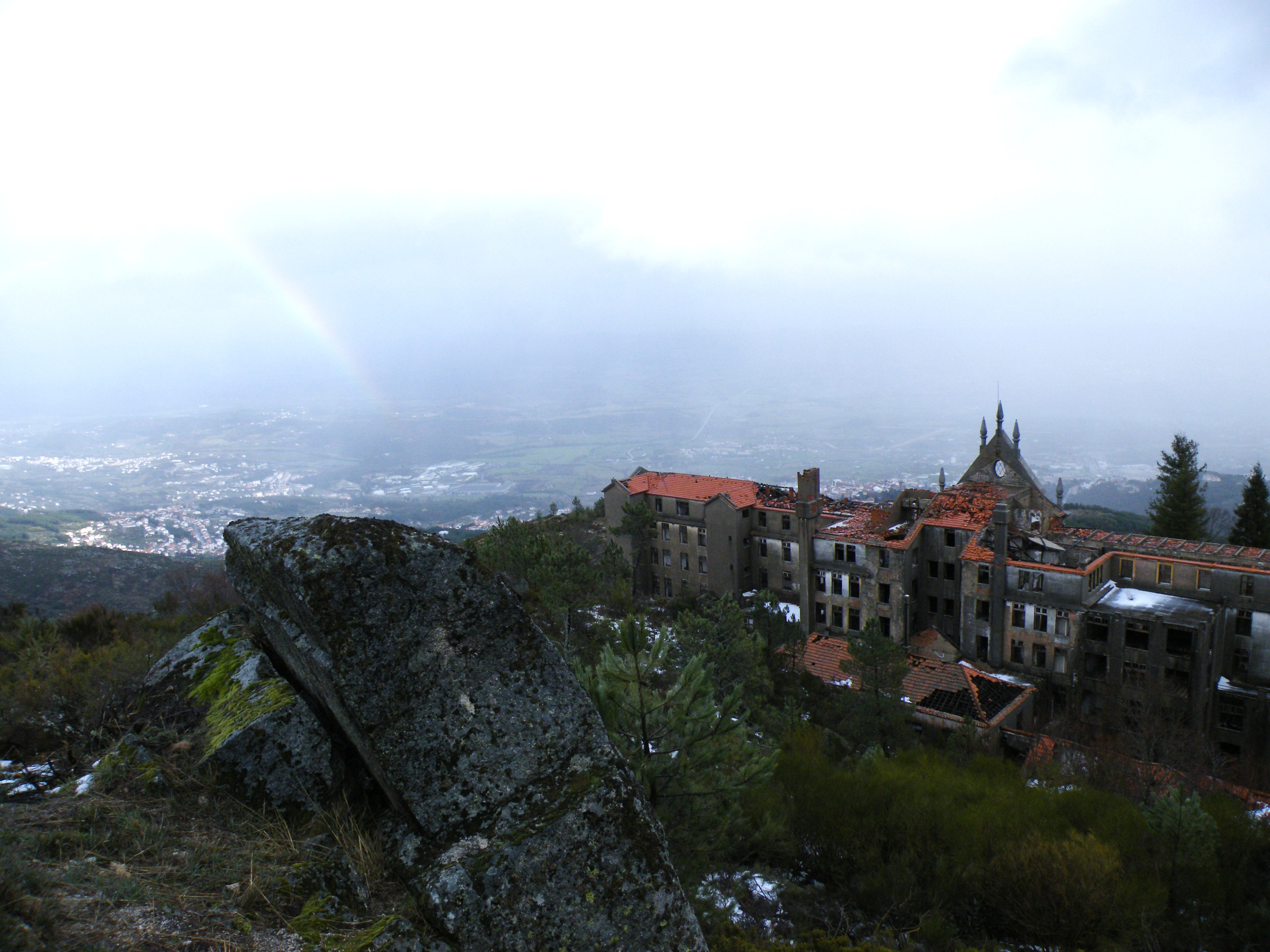
Ruins of the Tuberculosis Sanatorium

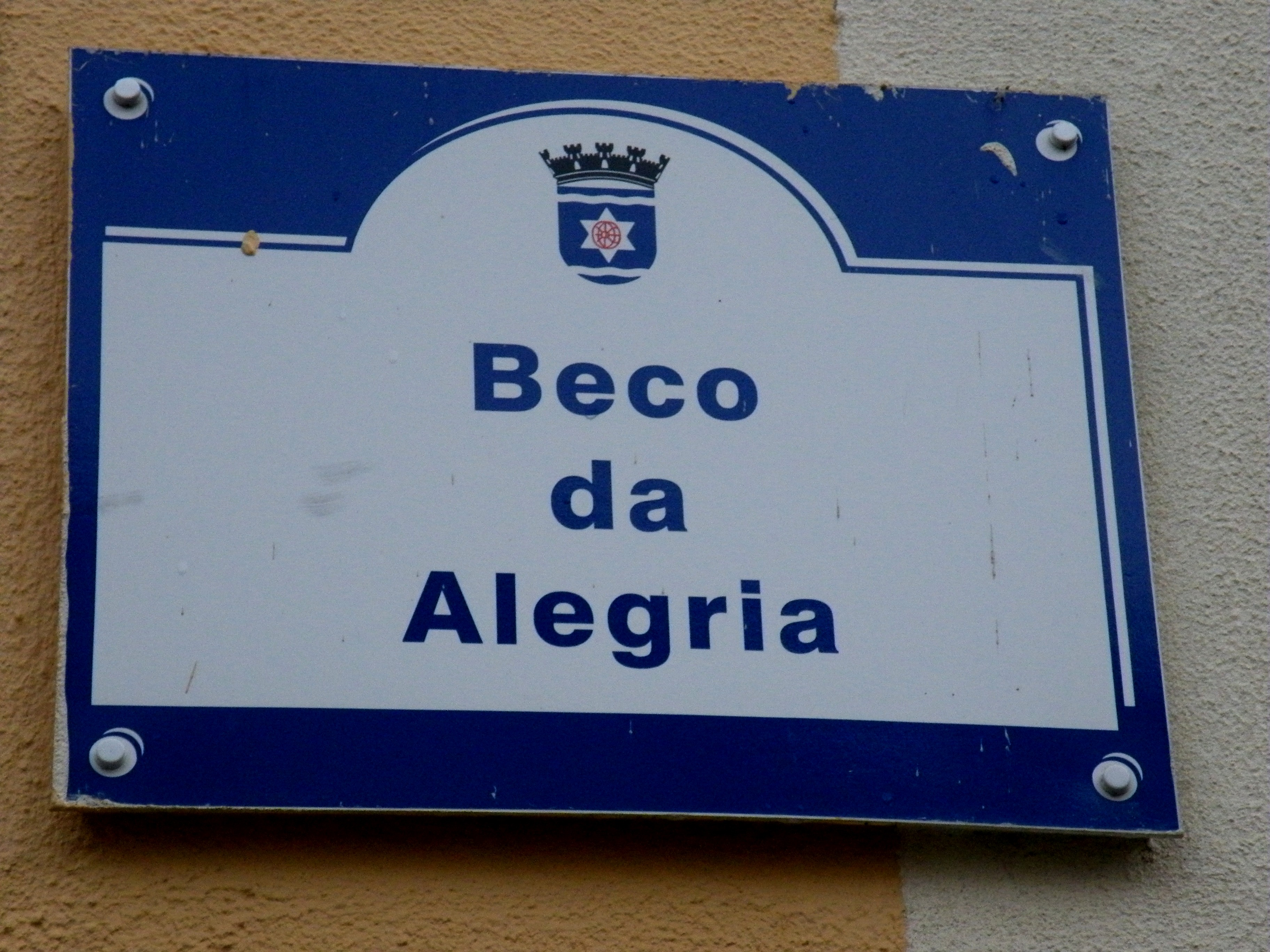
Street sign linked to town's history

== See also ==
- Centro, Portugal
- University of Beira Interior
