= Boidobra =

- Civil parish
- Location in Portugal
- Coordinates: 40.251°N 7.500°W
- Country: Portugal
- Region: Centro
- Intermunic. comm.: Beiras e Serra da Estrela
- District: Castelo Branco
- Municipality: Covilhã

Area
  - Total: 16.26 km^{2} (6.28 sq mi)

Population (2011)
  - Total: 3,246
  - Density: 200/km^{2} (520/sq mi)
- Time zone: UTC+00:00 (WET)
  - Summer (DST): UTC+01:00 (WEST)

Boidobra is a civil parish in the municipality of Covilhã, Portugal. The population in 2011 was 3,246, in an area of 16.26 square kilometres (6.28 sq mi).
