= List of tunnels in Portugal =

== Portugal's longest tunnels - in use ==
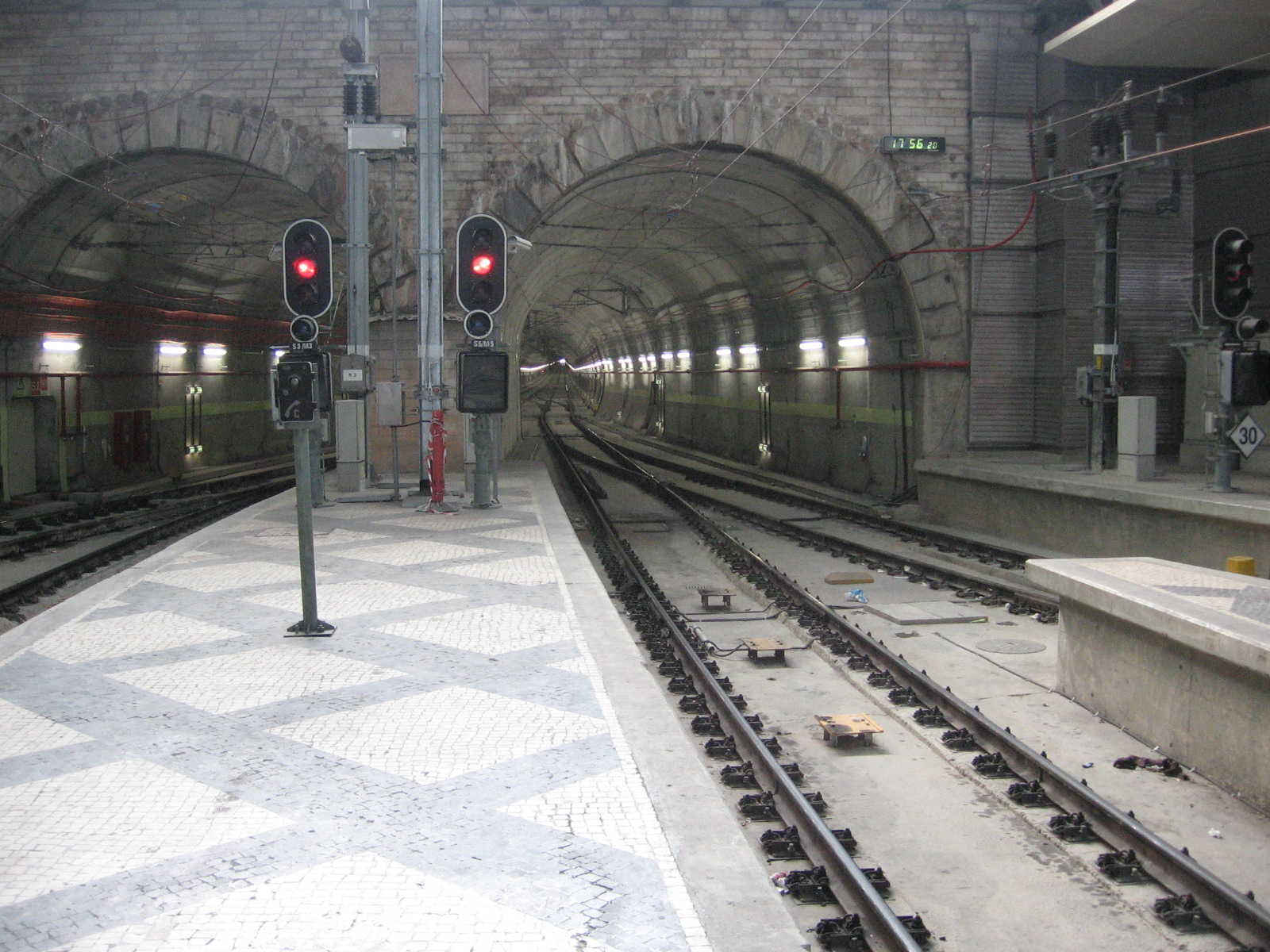
Rossio Tunnel, seen from Rossio Railway Station, Lisbon.

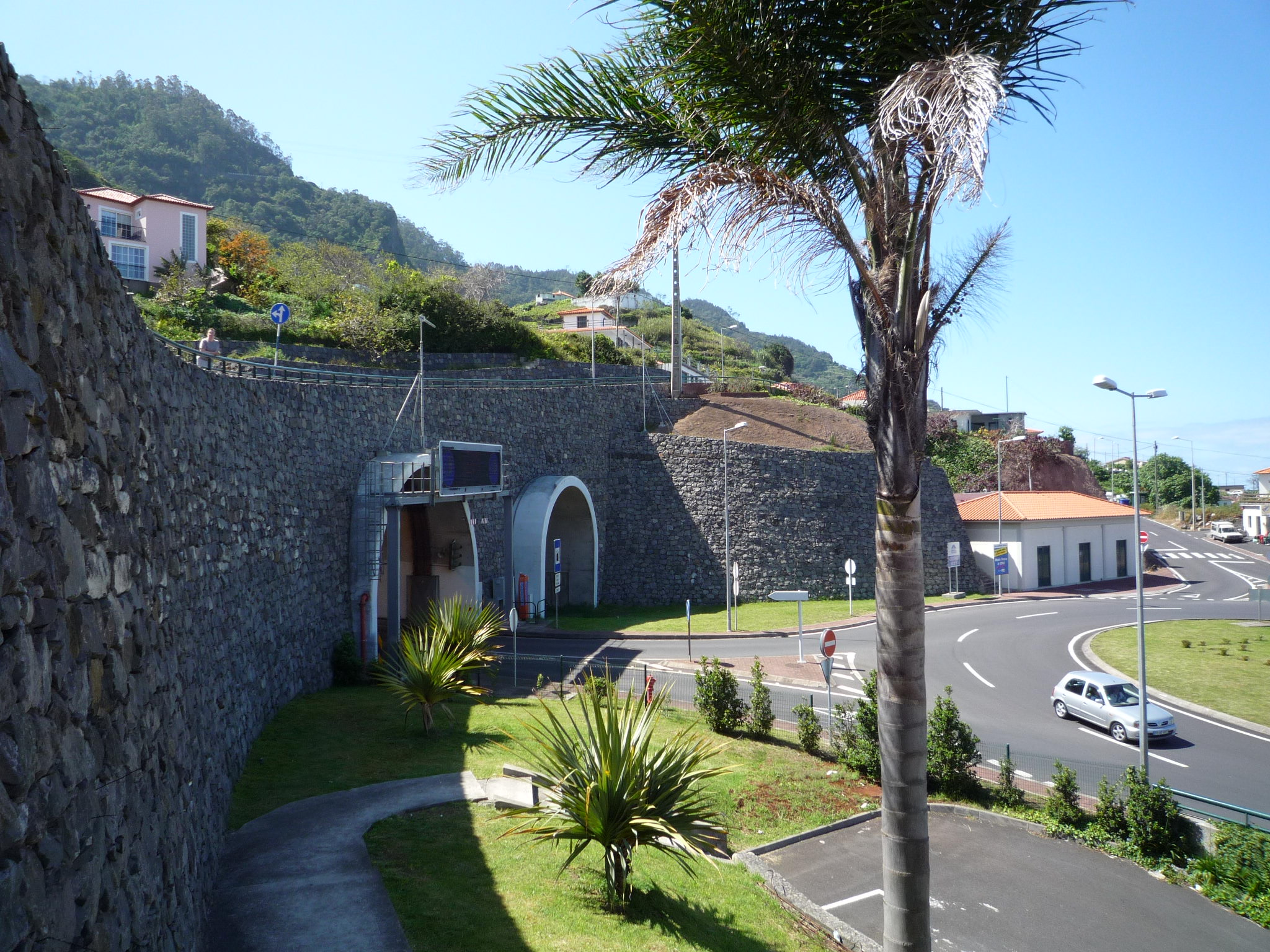
The Faial portal of the Cortado Tunnel

Name	Name in Portuguese	Location	Length	Type	Year	Comment
Metro Lisbon - Blue (Seagull) Line	Linha Azul ou Linha da Gaivota	Lisbon	14,000 m (45,932 ft)	Metro	1959–2007	
Metro Lisbon - Yellow (Sunflower) Line	Linha Amarela ou Linha do Girassol	Lisbon	11,000 m (36,089 ft)	Metro	1959–2004	
Metro Lisbon - Green (Caravel) Line	Linha Verde ou Linha da Caravela	Lisbon	9,000 m (29,528 ft)	Metro	1972–2002	
Metro Lisbon - Red (Orient) Line	Linha Vermelha ou Linha do Oriente	Lisbon	8,200 m (26,903 ft)	Metro	1998–2009	
Marão Tunnel	Túnel do Marão	Serra do Marão mountain range	5,665 m (18,586 ft)	Road	2016	Longest road tunnel in Portugal and third longest in the Iberian Peninsula.
Cortado Tunnel	Túnel do Cortado	Madeira	3,168 m (10,394 ft)	Road	2004	Longest road tunnel in Madeira.
Ponta do Sol Tunnel	Túnel da Ponta do Sol	Madeira	2,682 m (8,799 ft)	Road	2004	
Encumeada Tunnel	Túnel da Encumeada	Madeira	3,100 m (10,171 ft)	Road	2004	
Rossio Tunnel	Túnel do Rossio	Lisbon	2,613 m (8,573 ft)	Railway	1890	Longest railway tunnel in Portugal.
Jardim do Mar Tunnel	Túnel do Jardim do Mar	Madeira	2,511 m (8,238 ft)	Road	2001	
Curral das Freiras Tunnel	Túnel do Curral das Freiras	Curral das Freiras, Madeira	2,404 m (7,887 ft)	Road	2004	
Caniçal Tunnel	Túnel do Caniçal	Caniçal, Madeira	2,125 m (6,972 ft)	Road	2004	
North Tunnel	Túnel do Norte	Madeira	2,097 m (6,880 ft)	Road	2001	
Ribeira Brava Tunnel	Túnel da Ribeira Brava	Ribeira Brava, Madeira	1,806 m (5,925 ft)	Road		
Gardunha Tunnel	Túnel da Gardunha	Serra da Gardunha, near Fundão	1,580 m (5,184 ft)	Road	1997–2003	Road

== Tunnels proposed ==
- Serra da Estrela - an 8,600 m tunnel project

== See also ==
- Tunnel
- List of tunnels
- List of long tunnels by type contains separate tables for rock, railroad, subway and vehicular tunnels.
- List of tunnels by location
