= Cova da Beira Subregion =

Coordinates: 40°16′50″N 7°30′21″W

Map showing the location of the Cova da Beira subregion

Cova da Beira (European Portuguese pronunciation: [ˈkɔvɐ ðɐ ˈβɐjɾɐ]) is a former NUTS3 subregion of Portugal integrated in the NUTS2 Centro region. It was abolished at the January 2015 NUTS 3 revision. It lies in the fertile valley between the Serra da Estrela and Gardunha mountains. It covers an area of 1,373 km^{2}, with a population of 92,460 inhabitants for a density of 67 inhabitants/km^{2}. The major cities are Covilhã (pop. 31,500 - city proper), Fundão (pop. 9,000 - city proper) and Belmonte (pop. 6,800 - city proper). The subregion has a significant economic output related mainly with textiles, food industry, agriculture and mining. The most significant productions include woollen, fabrics, olive oil, wine, wood, cherries, peaches and other vegetables. Some of the most important wolframite (most important mineral source of the metal tungsten) mines in the world are explored within its limits. Other important mines extract lead and tin. Mineral water is bottled from several sources. There is a state-run university in the city of Covilhã (University of Beira Interior ) and a major state-run Hospital Center with buildings in Covilhã and Fundão (Centro Hospitalar Cova da Beira ).

== Municipalities ==
Cova da Beira subregion has 3 municipalities (concelhos in Portuguese):

- Belmonte
- Covilhã
- Fundão

== See also ==
- Cova da Beira IPR
