= Cova da Beira University Hospital Center =

Centro Hospitalar Universitário Cova da Beira

Geography
- Location: Cova da Beira, Portugal
- Coordinates: 40.266261°N 7.492296°W

Organisation
- Type: Teaching
- Affiliated university: University of Beira Interior

History
- Constructed: June 1908 (Covilha) October 16, 1955 (Fundão)
- Opened: 1908 (Hospital Pêro da Covilhã), 1955 (Hospital do Fundão)

Links
- Website: www.chcbeira.pt
- Lists: Hospitals in Portugal

The Cova da Beira University Hospital Center (CHUCB - Centro Hospitalar Universitário Cova da Beira) is a Portuguese state-run hospital center in the Cova da Beira subregion. It has the role of teaching hospital of the University of Beira Interior, and is composed by two autonomous hospitals located in the neighbouring cities of Covilhã (Hospital Pêro da Covilhã), established in June 1908, and Fundão (Hospital do Fundão), established on October 16, 1955.
