= Air Cargo Challenge =

European aeronautical engineering competition

- Founded: 2003
- Purpose: Design-Built-Fly, Competition
- Origins: Lisbon, Portugal
- Region served: Academic Competitions, Aerospace, Aeronautics, Competition, UAVs
- Key people: João Pedro Loureiro, Founder; Luis Cruz, Co-Founder
- Website: aircargochallenge.de

The Air Cargo Challenge is an aeronautical engineering student competition that is held in Europe every two years.

This competition was held for the first time in 2003 and it was founded by a group of Aerospace students in Lisbon. The competition is primarily directed to aeronautical and aerospace engineering students, similarly to the north-American Design/Build/Fly.

The main objective is to design and build a radio-controlled aircraft that is able to fly with the highest possible payload according with the rules established in the competition regulations, which vary in each edition. The team's score is not only given by the performance demonstrated in the flight competition part, but also by the technical quality of the project, through the evaluation of the design report and drawings.

The event's first edition (ACC'03) was organized by the APAE: Associação Portuguesa de Aeronáutica e Espaço (Portuguese Association of Aeronautics and Space), an aerospace group from Instituto Superior Técnico. From the ACC'07 onwards, the competition grew to an international level under the umbrella of EUROAVIA, the European Association of Aerospace Students, and the winning team got the possibility of organizing the next edition. The ACC of 2011 was held in the University of Stuttgart, August 2011, organized by the AKAModell Stuttgart together with the EUROAVIA Stuttgart. The Universidade da Beira Interior was the winner of this edition, thus it took place in Portugal'. Again, the Team from Stuttgart won this Edition, and got the organization responsibility. In 2017 the 2015 winner HUSZ organized the event in Zagreb. The competition took place in Stuttgart again on August 12–17, 2019. After a one-year delay due to the Covid pandemic, the competition was held in Munich in the summer of 2022. The 2022 winner ADDI organized the 2024 edition on 10–12 July in Aachen, Germany. Stuttgart organized for the fourth time in 2026 and after 4 editions and 9 years, the ACC leaves Germany for Udine, Italy in 2028.

== Competition results ==
=== 2003 – Organization: APAE, Lisbon ===
Place	Team	University	Country/City
1st	UBI 2	University of Beira Interior	(Portugal) Covilhã
2nd	Flamingo	University of Minho	(Portugal) Guimarães
3rd	Beluga	University of Beira Interior	(Portugal) Covilhã

=== 2005 – Organization: APAE, Lisbon ===
Place	Team	University	Country/City
1st	Ícaro	Instituto Superior Técnico e University of Coimbra	(Portugal) Lisbon/Coimbra
2nd	Fly By	Faculdade de Engenharia da Universidade do Porto	(Portugal) Porto
3rd	Pegasus	University of Beira Interior	(Portugal) Covilhã

=== 2007 – Organization: Instituto Superior Técnico, Lisbon ===
Place	Team	University	Country
1st	PEGASUS II	University of Beira Interior	Portugal
2nd	Akamodell Stuttgart	University of Stuttgart	Germany
3rd	Blei-Ente	Euroavia Muenchen	Germany
4th	Lead Barons	Delft University of Technology	Netherlands
5th	ESTG Cargo	Polytechnic Institute of Leiria	Portugal
6th	Trencalos	Polytechnic University of Catalonia	Spain
7th	UBI2 - SkunkWorks	University of Beira Interior	Portugal
8th	UoPatras ATLAS	University of Patras	Greece
9th	De vliegende Hollander	Delft University of Technology	Netherlands
10th	FLY@UMINHO'07	University of Minho	Portugal

=== 2009 – Organization: University of Beira Interior, Covilhã ===
Place	Team	University	Country
1st	Akamodell Stuttgart	University of Stuttgart	Germany
2nd	TU Heavy	Technical University of Munich	Germany
3rd	ESTG Cargo2	Polytechnic Institute of Leiria	Portugal
4th	Sonic Kids	Politehnica University of Bucharest	Romania
5th	Lusofly	Portuguese Air Force Academy	Portugal
6th	UoP Atlas II	Hellenic Air Force Academy	Greece
7th	Anatolian Craft	Middle East Technical University	Turkey
8th	What's up Yaw	Hogeschool van Amsterdam	Netherlands
9th	FLY@UMINHO'09	University of Minho	Portugal
10th	Trencalòs	Polytechnic University of Catalonia	Spain
11th	INFINITeam	Politehnica University of Bucharest	Romania
12th	Aeraces	Instituto Superior Técnico	Portugal
13th	Ucari	Middle East Technical University	Turkey
14th	Volo Ergo Sum	University of Beira Interior	Portugal
15th	Pisa Cargo Project	University of Pisa	Italy
16th	Brutus	University of Porto	Portugal
17th	Uasas		Portugal
18th	CAL	Clube de Aeromodelismo de Lisboa	Portugal
19th	Equipa_0	Instituto Superior Técnico	Portugal
20th	Chicken Wings	University of Belgrade	Serbia
21st	Céfiro	University of León	Spain
22nd	Aero Swansea 09	Swansea University	United Kingdom

=== 2011 – Organization: University of Stuttgart, Stuttgart ===
Place	Team	University	Country
1st	UBI - Portugal	University of Beira Interior	Portugal
2nd	TU Eleven	Technical University of Munich	Germany
3rd	Tsinghua University	Tsinghua University	China
4th	Student Wings	Politehnica University of Bucharest	Romania
5th	Team K.U.Leuven	KU Leuven	Belgium
6th	PASSAROLA Team	Instituto Superior Técnico	Portugal
7th	Nymph Noir	Middle East Technical University	Turkey
8th	Trencalòs Team	Polytechnic University of Catalonia	Spain
9th	Anatolian Craft - Aselsan	Middle East Technical University	Turkey
10th	EUROAVIA Ntua	National Technical University of Athens	Greece
11th	Nymph Rouge	Middle East Technical University	Turkey
12th	High Flyers	Politehnica University of Bucharest	Romania
13th	IPL Team	Polytechnic Institute of Leiria	Portugal
14th	Air FEUP	University of Porto	Portugal
15th	Gryphus Team	University of Aveiro	Portugal
16th	UoPatras ATLAS III	University of Patras	Greece
17th	EUROAVIA Rzeszow	University of Rzeszów	Poland
18th	HUSZ Black Eagle	University of Zagreb	Croatia
19th	SU Team Eryr	Swansea University	United Kingdom
20th	Białystok MiSIE team	University of Białystok	Poland
21st	Luso SPAD	Instituto Superior de Engenharia de Lisboa	Portugal

=== 2013 – Organization: University of Beira Interior, Covilhã ===
Place	Team	University	Country
1st	AKAModell Stuttgart e.V.	University of Stuttgart	Germany
2nd	Tsinghua University	Tsinghua University	China
3rd	Beihang Aeromodelling Team 1	Beihang University	China
4th	HUSZ Vulture	University of Zagreb	Croatia
5th	Beihang Aeromodelling Team 1	Beihang University	China
6th	High Flyers	Silesian University of Technology	Poland
7th	EESC-USP Juliett	University of São Paulo	Brazil
8th	PHOENIX	Politehnica University of Bucharest	Romania
9th	EUROAVIA Athens – Hermes 2	University of Athens	Greece
10th	Podlasie Tigers	Bialystok University of Technology	Poland
11th	UoP ATLAS IIIB	University of Patras	Greece
12th	ANATOLIAN CRAFT	Middle East Technical University	Turkey
13th	EUROAVIA Rzeszów	University of Rzeszów	Poland
14th	UoP ATLAS IV	University of Patras	Greece
15th	Trencalòs Team	Polytechnic University of Catalonia	Spain
16th	Team KU Leuven	KU Leuven	Belgium
17th	IPLeiria AirCargo	Polytechnic Institute of Leiria	Portugal
18th	LUSITÂNIA Team	UBI, IST, UNL (unofficially)	Portugal
19th	HERCULES	Instituto Superior Técnico	Portugal
20th	Gryphus II	University of Aveiro	Portugal
21st	Angry Bird	Cairo University	Egypt

=== 2015 – Organization: University of Stuttgart, Stuttgart ===
Place	Team	University	Country
1st	EUROAVIA Zagreb	University of Zagreb	Croatia
2nd	Born TU Lift	Technical University of Munich	Germany
3rd	EUROLIFTER	Rzeszów University of Technology	Poland
4th	AeroUD-MET	University of Udine	Italy
5th	AERO@UBI	University of Beira Interior	Portugal
6th	AIR	Tsinghua University	China
7th	PISA Air Cargo Team	University of Pisa	Italy
8th	ATLAS TEAM UPAT	University of Patras	Greece
9th	NPU INNOVATION	Northwestern Polytechnical University	China
10th	UPC Venturi	Polytechnic University of Catalonia	Spain
11th	Team KU Leuven	KU Leuven	Belgium
12th	Olisipo	Instituto Superior Técnico	Portugal
13th	Studencki Klub Modelarski Wojskowej Akademii Technicznej	Military University of Technology in Warsaw	Poland
14th	BUT Chicken Wings	Brno University of Technology	Czech Republic
15th	High Flyers	Silesian University of Technology	Poland
16th	The Lifters	Rzeszów University of Technology	Poland
17th	TransylAVIA	Technical University of Cluj-Napoca	Romania
18th	Poznań Aero Design	Poznań University of Technology	Poland
19th	Trencalòs Team	Polytechnic University of Catalonia	Spain
20th	Podlasie Tigers	Bialystok University of Technology	Poland
21st	Owl Tamers Aero Design Team	Middle East Technical University	Turkey
22nd	SKYLINE	University of Belgrade	Serbia
23rd	PhoeniX	University of Porto	Portugal

=== 2017 – Organization: University of Zagreb, Zagreb ===
Place	Team	University	Country
1st	AKAModell Stuttgart e.V.	University of Stuttgart	Germany
2nd	Fly Hard	Technical University of Munich	Germany
3rd	Born TU Lift Reloaded	Technical University of Munich	Germany
4th	AeroUD-MET	University of Udine	Italy
5th	AIR	Tsinghua University	China
6th	NPU INNOVATION	Northwestern Polytechnical University	China
7th	AKA Classics	University of Stuttgart	Germany
8th	JetStream	Wrocław University of Science and Technology	Poland
9th	Icarus Polito	Politecnico di Torino	Italy
10th	UPC Venturi	Polytechnic University of Catalonia	Spain
11th	The Lifters	Rzeszow University of Technology	Poland
12th	Aristotle Space & Aeronautics Team	Aristotle University of Thessaloniki	Greece
13th	Chicken Wings	Brno University of Technology	Czech Republic
14th	Hermes Team	University of Athens	Greece
15th	Aerotéc - Lisbon	Instituto Superior Técnico	Portugal
16th	ATLAS Team UPAT	University of Patras	Greece
17th	LKN	Bialystok University of Technology	Poland
18th	ATA Team	Istanbul Technical University	Turkey
19th	Kovan	Istanbul Technical University	Turkey
20th	AERO@UBI_PVG - Portugal	University of Beira Interior	Portugal
21st	PHOENIX Team	Politehnica University of Bucharest	Romania
22nd	The Wingineers	Katholieke Universiteit Leuven	Belgium
23rd	AERO@UBI_MARS	University of Beira Interior	Portugal
24nd	Trencalòs Team	Polytechnic University of Catalonia	Spain
25nd	VALCAN PROJECT	Universitat Politècnica de València	Spain
26nd	Buzz Lightyear	Zewail City of Science, Technology and Innovation	Egypt
27nd	TransylAVIA	Technical University of Cluj-Napoca	Romania
28nd	Flightmare	Zewail City of Science, Technology and Innovation	Egypt

=== 2019 – Organization: University of Stuttgart, Stuttgart ===
Place	Team	University	Country
1st	Fly Harder (AkaModell München)	Technical University of Munich	Germany
2nd	... and the Beast	University of Udine	Italy
3rd	The Beauty ...	University of Udine	Italy
4th	THU AIR	Tsinghua University	China
5th	AERO@UBI	University of Beira Interior	Portugal
6th	ICARUS PoliTo	Politecnico di Torino	Italy
7th	Chicken Wings	Brno University of Technology	Czech Republic
8th	Lift Up	University of Padova	Italy
9th	EUROAVIA RZESZOW	Rzeszow University of Technology	Poland
10th	A.S.A.T.-Aurora	Aristotle University of Thessaloniki	Greece
11th	ACC - Lisboa	University of Lisbon	Portugal
12th	Nephele	Aristotle University of Thessaloniki	Greece
13th	Jetstream	Wrocław University of Science and Technology	Poland
14th	HUSZ Jaeger	University of Zagreb	Croatia
15th	KOVAN	Istanbul Technical University	Turkey
16th	Trencalòs Team	Polytechnic University of Catalonia	Spain
17th	Team Vexilium Pisa	University of Pisa	Italy
18th	Albatross Tampere	Tampere University	Finland
19th	BEOAVIA	University of Belgrade	Serbia
20th	ROTA	Istanbul Technical University	Turkey
21st	NPU-Innovation	Northwestern Polytechnical University	China
22nd	ATA	Istanbul Technical University	Turkey
23rd	Titan Team	Politehnica University of Bucharest	Romania
24nd	Locreum Project	University of Cádiz	Spain
25nd	UPC Venturi	Polytechnic University of Catalonia	Spain
26nd	Xtra2	Polytechnic University of Valencia	Spain
27nd	HERMES	National Technical University of Athens	Greece

=== 2022 – Organization: AkaModell München e.V., Technical University of Munich, Munich ===
The 2021 edition of the ACC was delayed to 2022 due to the Covid pandemic. It was organized by AkaModell München from Technical University of Munich. All information to the ACC2022 can be found on www.acc2022.de. The competition took place 5.7.2022-9.7.2022 in Munich. The regulations were released on August 6, 2020.

Place	Team	University	Country
1st	ADDI	RWTH Aachen	Germany
2nd	AeroUD	University of Udine	Italy
3rd	AkaModell Stuttgart	University of Stuttgart	Germany
4th	Xtra2 UPV	Polytechnic University of Valencia	Spain
5th	Chicken Wings BUT	Brno University of Technology	Czech Republic
6th	LiftUP	University of Padova	Italy
7th	Chicken Wings CTU	Czech Technical University in Prague	Czech Republic
8th	JetStream	Wrocław University of Science and Technology	Poland
9th	ASAT	Aristotle University of Thessaloniki	Greece
10th	Olissipo	University of Lisbon	Portugal
11th	U-Fly	Universidad Aeronáutica en Querétaro (UNAQ)	Mexico
12th	ICARUS PoliTo	Politecnico di Torino	Italy
13th	AeroUBI	University of Beira Interior	Portugal
14th	HUSZ Falcons	University of Zagreb	Croatia
15th	BEOAVIA	University of Belgrade	Serbia
16th	LeanIng	University of Pisa	Italy
17th	Tophane Aygök	Tophane Vocational and Technic High School	Turkey
18th	ITU Sky-UAV	Istanbul Technical University	Turkey
19th	Trencalòs	Polytechnic University of Catalonia	Spain
20th	Albatross	Tampere University	Finland
21st	UVigo Aerotech	University of Vigo, Ourense Campus	Spain
22nd	WUT	Warsaw University of Technology	Poland
23rd	THU AIR	Tsinghua University	China
24nd	HAWings	HAW Hamburg	Germany
25nd	HERMES	National Technical University of Athens	Greece
26nd	Locreum	University of Cádiz	Spain

=== 2024 – Organization: Aachen Drone Development Initiative, RWTH Aachen University ===
Place	Team	University	Country
1st	AkaModell Stuttgart	University of Stuttgart	Germany
2nd	AeroUD	University of Udine	Italy
3rd	UBI Aeronautics	Universidade da Beira Interior (UBI)	Portugal
4th	ICARUS PoliTO	Politecnico di Torino	Italy
5th	Xtra2 UPV	Technical University of Valencia	Spain
6th	AeroTéc ATLAS	University of Lisbon	Portugal
7th	TUM fliegt gut!	Technical University of Munich	Germany
8th	ASAT Aeronautics	Aristotle University of Thessaloniki	Greece
9th	LeanIng Project	University of Pisa	Italy
10th	Lift UP	University of Padua	Italy
11th	UGA	University of Glasgow	Scotland
12th	CCX Corvus Corax	University of Naples Federico II	Italy
13th	M.ACH.	University of Patras	Greece
14th	HERMES NTUA	National Technical University of Athens	Greece
15th	VANTUS AeroTeam	University of Seville	Spain
16th	CTU Aerolab	Czech Technical University in Prague	Czech Republic
17th	EUROAVIA Rzeszów	Rzeszów University of Technology	Poland
18th	Team Albatross	Tampere University of Technology	Finland
19th	Chicken Wings BUT	Brno University of Technology	Czech Republic
20th	AEROATLAS	Politehnica University of Bucharest	Romania
21st	BEOAVIA	University of Belgrade	Serbia
22nd	HuskyWorks	University of Washington	United States
23rd	SUAVE	University of Sydney	Australia
24th	UVigo Aerotech	University of Vigo	Spain
25th	Rakshak	Indian Institute of Technology Bombay	India
26th	UCA&Air	University of Cádiz	Spain
27th	FlyMi	Polytechnic University of Milan	Italy
28th	WUT AeroDesign	Warsaw University of Technology	Poland
29th	THU-AIR	Tsinghua University	China
30th	ITU ATA Team	Istanbul Technical University	Turkey

=== 2026 – Organization: AkaModell Stuttgart, University of Stuttgart ===
Place	Team	University	Country
1st	AeroUD	University of Udine	Italy
2nd	AkaModell München	Technical University of Munich	Germany
3rd	Xtra2 UPV	Universitat Politècnica de València	Spain
4th	CTU AeroLab	Czech Technical University in Prague	Czech Republic
5th	LIFT UP	Università degli Studi di Padova	Italy
6th	UBI Aeronautics Team	Universidade da Beira Interior	Portugal
7th	Icarus PoliTO	Politecnico di Torino	Italy
8th	RhinoJet	INSA Lyon / École Centrale de Lyon	France
9th	Team NOVA	Politehnica University of Bucharest	Romania
10th	Lambach Aircraft	Delft University of Technology	Netherlands
11th	ASAT Aeronautics	Aristotle University of Thessaloniki	Greece
12th	THU AIR	Tsinghua University	China
13th	Sydney UAV Engineering	University of Sydney	Australia
14th	ATLAS - M.ACH	University of Patras	Greece
15th	WUT AeroDesign	Warsaw University of Technology	Poland
16th	AeroTéc ATLAS	Universidade de Lisboa	Portugal
17th	HERMES TEAM	National Technical University of Athens	Greece
18th	VANTUS AeroDesign Team	University of Seville	Spain
19th	JetStream	Wrocław University of Science and Technology	Poland
20th	Trencalòs Team	Universitat Politècnica de Catalunya	Spain
21st	Fly-Mi EUROAVIA Milano	Politecnico di Milano	Italy
22nd	Euroavia Zagreb	University of Zagreb	Croatia
23rd	Team Albatross	Tampere University	Finland
24th	TOPHANE AYGÖK	Tophane Vocational and Technical High School	Turkey
25th	DIANA	Universidad de Castilla-La Mancha	Spain
26th	CUHAR	Chulalongkorn University	Thailand
27th	ITU ATA TEAM	Istanbul Technical University	Turkey
28th	The Cajun Jet	University of Louisiana at Lafayette	United States
29th	University of Glasgow Aeronautics	University of Glasgow	Scotland
30th	BEOAVIA	University of Belgrade	Serbia
31st	UVigo Aerotech	Universidade de Vigo	Spain
32nd	AirOne	University of Bologna	Italy
33rd	GAZİTAYYARECİLERİ	Gazi University	Turkey
34th	Team Ancyra	Middle East Technical University	Turkey

== Statistics ==
=== Number of participated teams per country (2007–2026) ===
Place	Country	Number of participated teams
1st	Portugal	37
2nd	Spain	27
3rd	Italy	25
4th	Greece	22
4th	Poland	22
6th	Turkey	19
7th	Germany	18
8th	China	13
9th	Romania	11
10th	Czech Republic	8
11th	Croatia	6
11th	Serbia	6
13th	Belgium	4
13th	Finland	4
13th	Netherlands	4
16th	Egypt	3
17th	Australia	2
17th	Scotland	2
17th	United Kingdom	2
17th	United States	2
21st	Brazil	1
21st	France	1
21st	India	1
21st	Mexico	1
21st	Thailand	1

=== Medal table (2007–2026) ===
Place	Team	University	City	Country	Gold	Silver	Bronze
1	AKAModell Stuttgart e.V.	University of Stuttgart	Stuttgart	Germany	4	1	1
2	UBI	University of Beira Interior	Covilhã	Portugal	2		1
3	AkaModell München e.V.	Technical University of Munich	Munich	Germany	1	5	2
4	AeroUD	University of Udine	Udine	Italy	1	3	1
5	EUROAVIA Zagreb	University of Zagreb	Zagreb	Croatia	1		
5	ADDI	RWTH Aachen	Aachen	Germany	1		
7	Tsinghua University	Tsinghua University	Beijing	China		1	1
8	Beihang Aeromodelling Team 1	Beihang University	Beijing	China			1
8	ESTG Cargo2	Polytechnic Institute of Leiria	Leiria	Portugal			1
8	EUROLIFTER	Rzeszów University of Technology	Rzeszów	Poland			1
8	Xtra2 UPV	Polytechnic University of Valencia	Valencia	Spain			1
