= University of Beira Interior =

Public university in Covilhã, Portugal

Coordinates: 40.27738°N 7.50887°W

- Universidade da Beira Interior
- Motto: Scientia et Labore Altiora Petimus (Latin)
- Type: Public university
- Established: 1979
- Rector: Ana Paula Coelho Duarte (2025-)
- Academic staff: 772 (2022)
- Administrative staff: 254 (2022)
- Students: 10 000 (2024)
- Location: Covilhã, Portugal
- Campus: Urban
- Colours: Blue
- Website: www.ubi.pt

The University of Beira Interior (UBI; Portuguese: Universidade da Beira Interior) is a public university located in the city of Covilhã, Portugal. It was created in 1979, and has about 6,879 students distributed across a multiplicity of graduation courses, awarding all academic degrees in fields ranging from medicine, biochemistry, biomedical sciences and industrial design to aeronautical engineering, fashion design, mathematics, economics and philosophy. The university is named after the historical Beira region, meaning Beira Interior, the most interior area of Beira, mainly composed by the district of Guarda and the district of Castelo Branco, in today's Centro region.

== History ==
In August 1973, following a major change in the national higher education system, the government established a polytechnical institution in Covilhã, the Polytechnic Institute of Covilhã (IPC - Instituto Politécnico da Covilhã), which was the first higher education institution in the city. Over the years, the IPC facilities, as well as the enrolment and staff, never ceased to grow. This growth and the region's needs, led the IPC to a remarkable level of achievements that granted it, in 1979, to be promoted, by the Portuguese Ministry of Education, to a higher institutional level, university institute. Seven years later, in 1986, the University Institute of Beira Interior was granted full university status and renamed University of Beira Interior (Universidade da Beira Interior).

The first rector was Professor Cândido Manuel Passos Morgado, from August 21, 1980 until January 19, 1996, then followed by Professor Manuel José dos Santos Silva who remained in office until June 19, 2009. On this date, the third Rector of the institution, Professor João António de Sampaio Rodrigues Queiroz, takes office, whose mandate ended on September 5, 2013. The fourth rector of the institution, who led it for two terms, was Professor António Carreto Fidalgo. The current rector of UBI is Professor Mário Lino Barata Raposo, who took office on June 8, 2021.

== Organisation ==
For teaching and research purposes, UBI is organised into five faculties. The faculties are organised in departments:

- The Faculty of Sciences includes the Department of Mathematics, Informatics, Physics, and Chemistry.
- The Faculty of Engineering Sciences includes the departments of Textile Science and Technology, Paper Science and Technology, Electromechanical Engineering, Architecture, Civil Engineering, and Aerospace Sciences.
- The Faculty of Human and Social Sciences is made up of the Department of Management and Economics, Department of Sociology, Department of Education Sciences and the Department of Sports Sciences.
- The Faculty of Arts and Letters includes the Department of Communication and Arts; and the Department of Letters
- The Faculty of Health Sciences includes the Department of Medical Sciences.

All departments of the university grant the undergraduate licenciado degree (licentiate's degree or bachelor's degree), which requires a three-year full-time study programme. UBI also awards postgraduate courses in the fields that are offered by its departments, granting the degrees of mestre (master's degree) and doutor (PhD).

In order to supply its own needs and those of the local community itself, the university has also five centres: the Teaching and Learning Resources Centre (CREA); the Centre for Patrimonial Studies and Recovery (CEPP); the Computer Centre (CI); the Optics Centre (CO) and the Centre of Studies for Regional Development (CEDR) which establishes the interface between the university and the community providing consulting services to local institutions in the areas of regional development.

The Centro Hospitalar Universitário Cova da Beira (Cova da Beira University Hospital Center), with facilities in Covilhã and Fundão, is the teaching hospital of the University of Beira Interior. Hospitals of Castelo Branco and Guarda also collaborate with UBI's Faculty of Health Sciences.

== UBI's Role in European Universities ==
University of Beira Interior (UBI) is one of the youngest public universities in Portugal and member of UNITA Consortium (Universitas Montium), one alliance of six european mountain universities, all romanic-speaking. This alliance is committed to promoting socioeconomic development in rural and cross-border áreas, with 165.000 students and 13.000 employees. The UNITA Consortium has six institutions of higher education of five countries:

- Università Degli Studi di Torino (UNITO) - Italy,
- Universidade da Beira Interior (UBI) - Portugal,
- Université de Pau et des Pays de L’Adour (UPPA) - France,
- Université Savoie Mont-Blanc (USMB) - France,
- Universitatea de Vest din Timisoara (UVT) – Romania,
- Universidad de Zaragoza (UNIZAR) - Spain.

The UNITA Consortium is based on the concepts of European identity, inter-comprehension, multiculturalism, and sustainability, and aims to develop a European Research Area focusing on three pillars: i) cultural heritage, ii) renewable energies, and iii) circular economy.

== Rankings ==
University rankings

Global – Overall
- THE World: 601–800 (2020)
- USNWR Global: 1093 (2020)

In 2020, the University of Beira Interior (UBI) maintained the status of one of the best international academies founded less than 50 years ago. The Times Higher Education Young University Rankings 2020 (THE-YUR) placed UBI at 151–200, within a list that analyzed 414 institutions of higher education around the world. UBI repeated the rank of the previous ranking, although the competition is increasing. In 2019, 351 academies had been analyzed, 63 less than this year. The rise in the number of institutions, however, did not jeopardize the position of UBI among the elite of the youngest universities from 66 countries on five continents. When analyzing the performance of the Portuguese institutions included in THE-YUR, UBI is in the second best level reached by the eight national higher education institutions, with only one ahead of it. In the parameter "Citations" it is even the best Portuguese academy on the list, appearing in 3rd place in "Internationalization". Compared to 2019, UBI improved its final score in four of the five major missions of universities, used for the construction of the study: "Teaching", "Research", "Knowledge Transfer" and "Internationalization". To prepare the Times Higher Education Young University Rankings are used the same 13 performance indicators of the main rankings of THE, as the World University Ranking, in which UBI is also included. Universities are evaluated on their main missions - teaching, research, knowledge transfer and internationalization - to allow the most comprehensive and balanced comparisons possible. In THE-YUR the weighting elements are calibrated to reflect the missions of young universities, with less emphasis on reputation surveys and more on factors such as research productivity, staff-to-student ratios and doctoral training, among others.

== Rectoral team ==
The rector is elected by the General Council for a term of four years and is assisted by vice-rectors and pro-rectors in specific tasks.

- Rector: Ana Paula Coelho Duarte
- Vice-rectors: José Carlos Páscoa Marques (Internationalization and Interaction with Society); Helena Maria Baptista Alves (Teaching, academic affairs and employability); Joaquim Mateus Paulo Serra (Human Resources, Tenders and Academic Acts); Amélia Cavaca Augusto (Quality, Social Responsibility and Social Action); Silvia Cristina Marques Socorro (Research, Innovation and Development); Silvio José Simões Mariano (Heritage, Infrastructure and Sustainability)
- Pro-rectors: Anabela Rosário Leitão Dinis (Finance Area); Pedro Ricardo Morais Inácio (Digital University); João Carlos Gonçalves Lanzinha (Project Area)

== Enrolment and staff ==
Current figures show an enrolment of approximately 8997 students from all over the country plus 772 professors and lecturers.

Students coming from other European Union member-states and PALOP (Países Africanos de Língua Oficial Portuguesa) countries accounts for nearly 200.

== Teaching and learning methods ==
All courses are taught in Portuguese language, and the teaching process is undertaken using a mixture of theoretical and practical processes. Theoretical lessons are usually supported by:

- Theoretical/Practical lessons where the students guided by the teacher have the chance to discuss and resolve problems.
- Practical lessons, where the students are challenged to solve practical problems in laboratories, ateliers or computer facilities and able to apply the theoretical knowledge that they already understood and learned.

== Academic year ==
The academic year at UBI consists of two semesters. The first (autumn and winter semester) is 20 weeks long. It runs from mid-September to mid-February and includes classes, work assessment and examinations of students. The second (spring and summer semester) is 20 weeks long. It runs from mid -February to mid-July and includes classes, work assessment and examinations of students. Christmas holidays last two weeks, and Easter break is one week.

== University campus ==
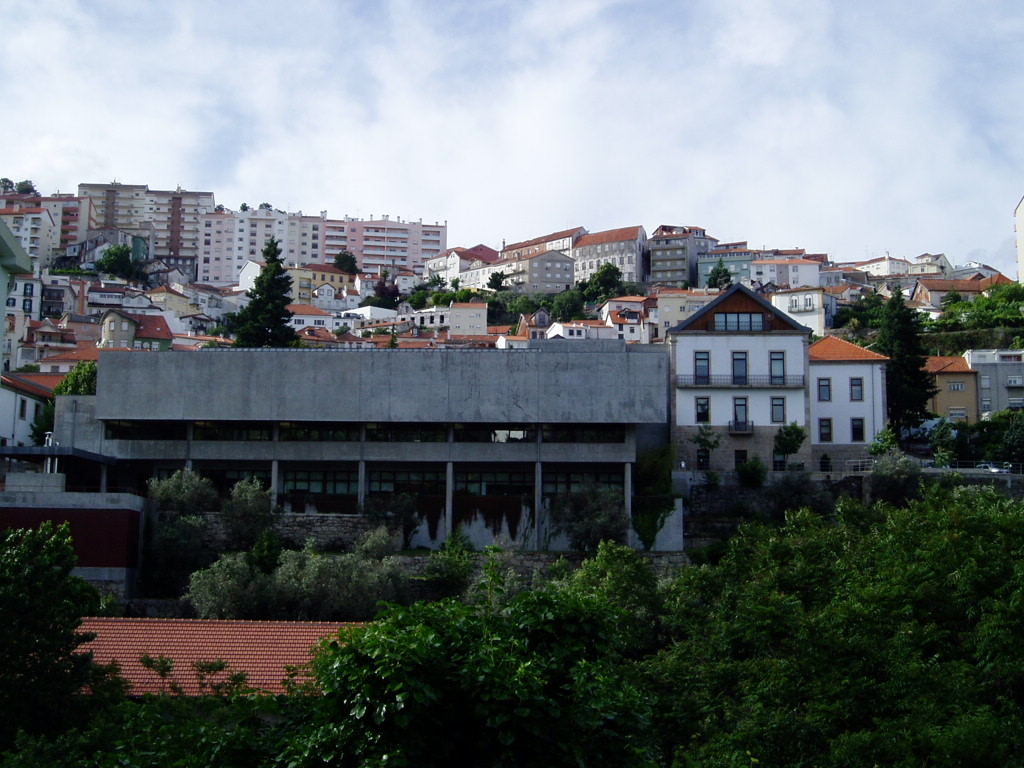
The main library of the University of Beira Interior

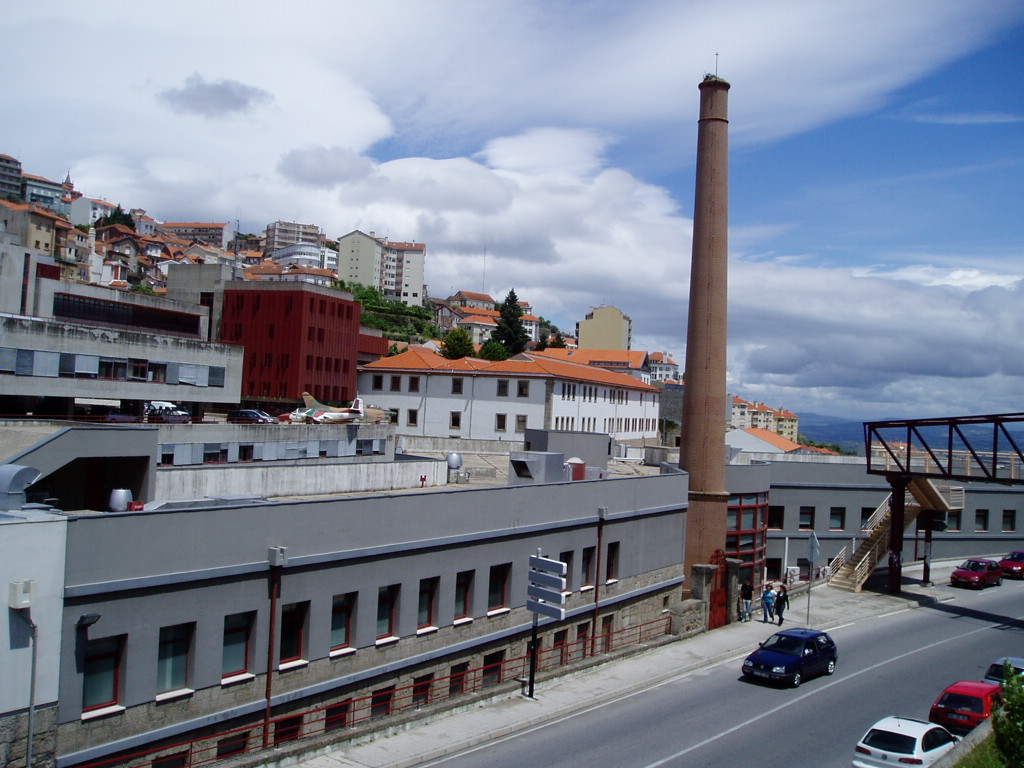
Pólo I main buildings

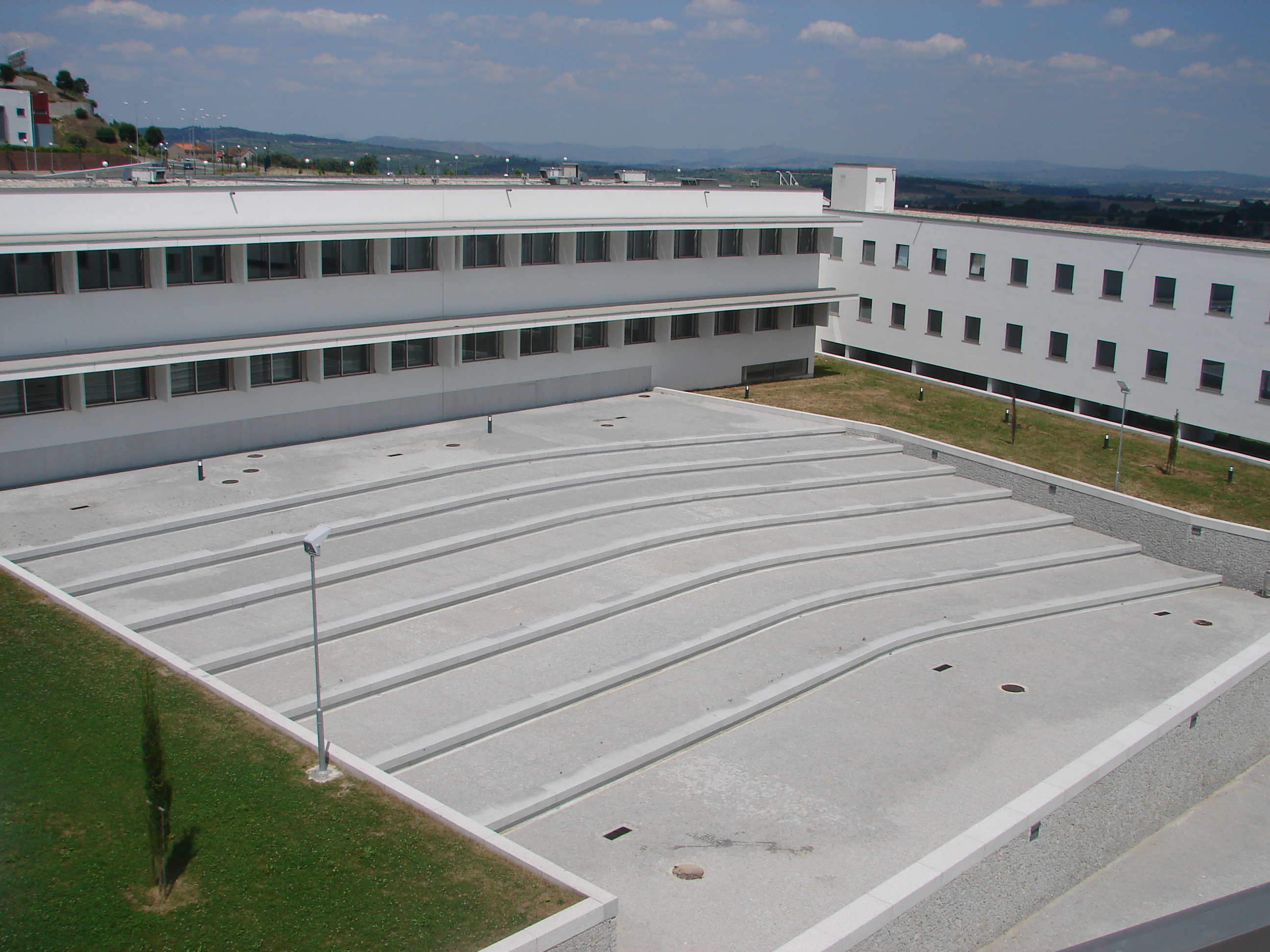
The outside auditorium of the Health Sciences Faculty of the University of Beira Interior (Pólo III)

Over 250,000 m^{2} of buildings are dedicated to academic activities and social services. The university campus is divided into several spaces, called Pólos, which are spread through the city establishing a real symbiosis between the city and the university as a public institution.

The synopsis below provides information about the Pólos of UBI and its libraries:

- Pólo I – The main building is a 17th-century textile factory that was renovated to house part of the university services, classrooms and offices. New buildings near have been erected over the years to keep up the continuous growth of the UBI. Due to a diligent renovation work this set of buildings are considered historical, cultural and architectonical outstanding pieces of industrial archaeology. Among this sector the following units are located: the Faculty of Arts and Humanities, the Faculty of Sciences, the Faculty of Engineering Sciences, the Wool Museum, the Computer Centre, the Optics Centre, the São Martinho Chapel, the Main Library, the Teaching and Learning Resources Centre (Multimedia Centre) and the Centre For Heritage Studies and Recovery.
- Pólo II – On a hill, less than 1 km from Pólo I, and meeting the UBI need for constant expansion, an area was created where several central infrastructures, as the emblematic 16th century convent that nowadays houses the Rectory, the administration services and the international relations office. In the same area are also located the academic residences, Santo Antonio cafeteria, the sport halls, the social affairs centre and the centre of studies for regional development. The Department of Sports and Science is also located nearby.
- Pólo III – This is where the Faculty of Health Sciences is located. It has a total area of 16,000 m2 situated nearby the Central Hospital in a distance of 1 km far from Pólo I.
- Pólo IV – This area is located in northern part of the city and was created to facilitate the expansion of the university. It houses the Faculty of Human and Social Sciences, the Cyber Centre and a residence hall with Snack Bar.
- Libraries – UBI has three libraries. The Main Library is located in Pólo I following the aim of meeting the students' needs. All libraries of UBI have an information desk where one can obtain information and help. Once the Library Card is issued, students can use it to borrow books from any library. The Main Library offers a wide range of services spread among 3 different floors. Textbooks and course materials, scientific publications, bibliographies and reference works in all subjects taught at the university are available. Among other services, students can use the individual study and reading rooms, Inter-Library loan service, photocopy services, scanners, CD-ROM, Videos, DVD or consult the Library Database and Internet (200 computers).

== UBI residence halls ==
The UBI maintains seven residence halls. One of the residence halls is located in Pólo II, 5 minutes of walking distance from the university's main buildings (Pólo I) and the other (Residência Pedro Álvares Cabral) is located near the Pólo IV. All the rooms are equipped with closets, desks, chairs, beds and central heating. One or two students are assigned to each room. The Students' Social Affairs Centre manages all the university housing offers.

== Students' union ==
The students' union, AAUBI – Associação Académica da Universidade da Beira Interior, is headquartered within the old part of the town, near Santa Maria church. The union also has its office in Pólo I, two floors upstairs from the bank.

The students' union (AAUBI) offers a wide range of activities concerning sports, culture and leisure. During the whole year there are many indoor events such like chess meetings or activities in sports halls as climbing, volleyball, basketball, football, badminton and table tennis.

A freshman reception week, organised by the students' union of the University of Beira Interior, takes place in November and includes a parade through town (the Latada) and several concerts.

== Online radio, television and journal ==
The university has an online radio, Rádio Universitária da Beira Interior, an online television, Televisão Universitária da Beira Interior, and an online journal, Urbi et Orbi.

== Athletics ==
The University of Beira Interior has two indoor sports pavilions, among other sports facilities. Competitive varsity sports teams of UBI include badminton, basketball, futsal, handball, rugby union and volleyball.

== Wool museum ==
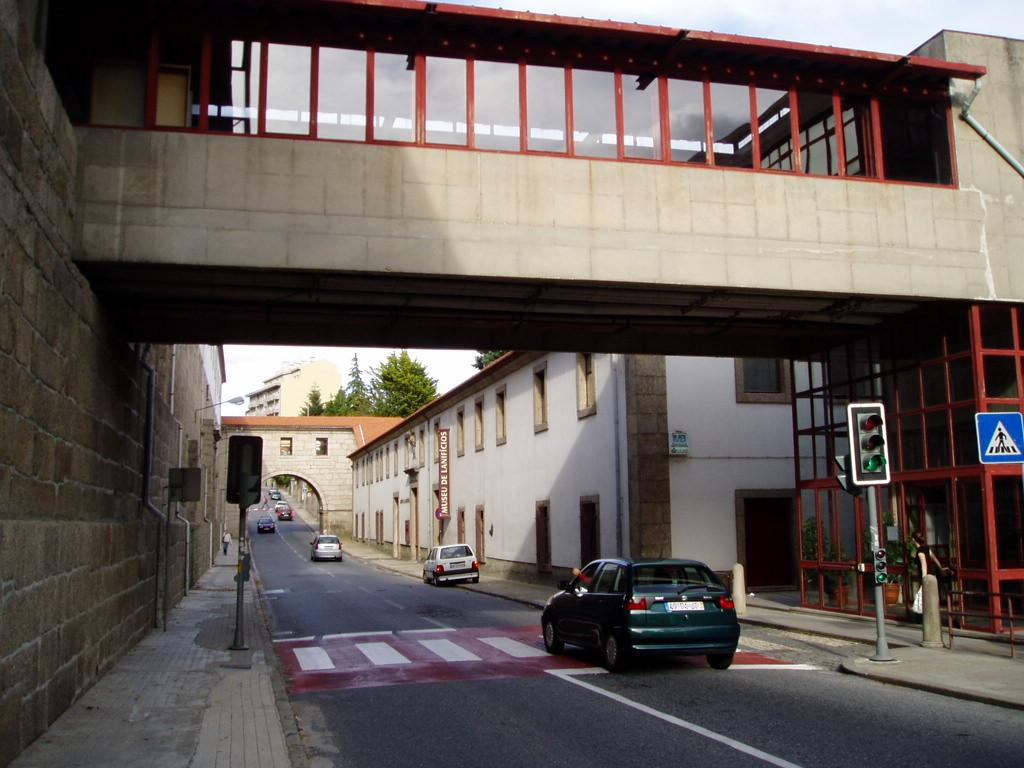
Wool museum entrance, to the right, which is delimited by two pedestrian bridges that connect two of the UBI's buildings

The UBI adapted the buildings of the former Real Fábrica de Panos (Royal Textile Factory), an important national woollens manufacturer established by Marquês de Pombal in 1764. This building served as a spinning, dyeing and weaving mill until 1885, when it was handed over to lodge the Regimento de Infantaria 21 (21st Infantry Regiment), and later the Batalhão de Caçadores 2 (2nd Sharpshooters Battalion).

In 1975, during the recovery and adaptation works of the building, archaeological remains of the old textile mill were discovered. The vats of the former dye-house were found. The discovery was classified as a part of the national cultural heritage and it was carefully recovered and restored. According to the museum's educational role, the discovered structures are helping to portray the dyeing processes used in Portugal in the second half of the 18th century.

Guided tours are available (free for UBI students). The museum is open on weekdays except Monday, from 09:30 to midday and from 14:30 to 18:00.

== See also ==
- List of universities in Portugal
- Higher education in Portugal
- Air Cargo Challenge
