= Celeste Rodrigues =

Portuguese fado singer

Celeste Rodrigues ComIH
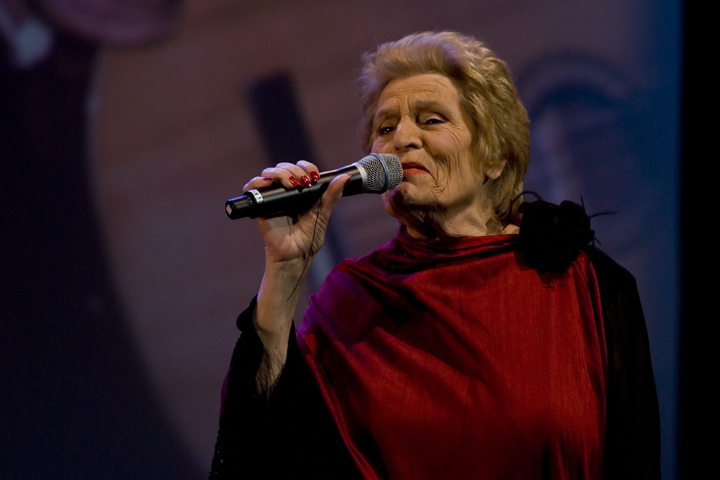

Background information
- Born: Maria Celeste Rebordão Rodrigues; 14 March 1923; Fundão, Portugal
- Died: 1 August 2018 (aged 95) Lisbon, Portugal
- Genres: Fado
- Occupation: Singer
- Instrument: Vocals
- Years active: 1951–2018
- Labels: Movieplay, CoastCompany

Maria Celeste Rebordão Rodrigues ComIH (14 March 1923 – 1 August 2018) was a Portuguese fadista (fado singer) and the younger sister of Amália Rodrigues.

== Biography ==
Celeste Rodrigues was born in Fundão in the district of Castelo Branco in Portugal on 14 March 1923. Her family moved to Lisbon when she was five years old. She started work in a cake factory, and subsequently she and her sister Amalia worked in a shop that sold regional produce. Soon discovered by the impresario José Miguel, who heard her sing and insisted she turn professional. By the age of 22 she was appearing regularly at the Casablanca (now the Teatro ABC). At 25, she met the actor Varela Silva whom she later married; they had two daughters.

After Carnation Revolution in 1974, Rodrigues went to Canada for six months, where her only marriage to actor Varela Silva ended in divorce; then she moved to the United States. She commuted for many years between her two residences in Lisbon and Washington, D.C., where her two daughters live.

Although she did not achieve nearly as comprehensive a career as her sister, Rodrigues was able to achieve substantial fame in her own right (especially in Portugal itself) with recordings such as Lenda das Algas (Legend of the Seaweed), Já é tarde (It is already late) and the emblematic Fado Celeste achievements.

Rodrigues sang a traditional style of fado, as opposed to the modern style of fado that her sister sang. In 2018, she was the oldest fado singer in the world, continuing to sing at age 95.

Like her sister Amália, Celeste Rodrigues was a monarchist and throughout her life met D. Duarte Nuno of Portugal, as well as the kings of Spain, Holland, and Italy. She said:

"I do not believe in politics, I am a monarchist."

&

"Everything beautiful was made in the time of kings and nothing in the Republic."

Rodrigues died on 1 August 2018, in Lisbon and she was buried in the Artists' Field at Prazeres Cemetery.

== Discography ==
- 2007 Fado Celeste (CD, CoastCompany)

=== Compilations ===
- 1995 O Melhor dos Melhores n.º 55 (CD, Movieplay)
