= Rzeszów University of Technology =

Coordinates: 50°01′37.2″N 21°59′6.1″E

- Politechnika Rzeszowska im. Ignacego Łukasiewicza
- Former name: PZL Engineering School (1951)
- Type: Public
- Established: September 30, 1951
- Affiliations: Erasmus Programme
- Chancellor: Andrzej Sowa, MSc, Eng.
- Rector: Prof. Piotr Koszelnik, DSc, PhD, Eng. - elected in 2020
- Administrative staff: 1,624
- Students: 10,714 (12.2023)
- Location: Rzeszów, Podkarpackie Voivodeship, Poland
- Website: PRz Homepage

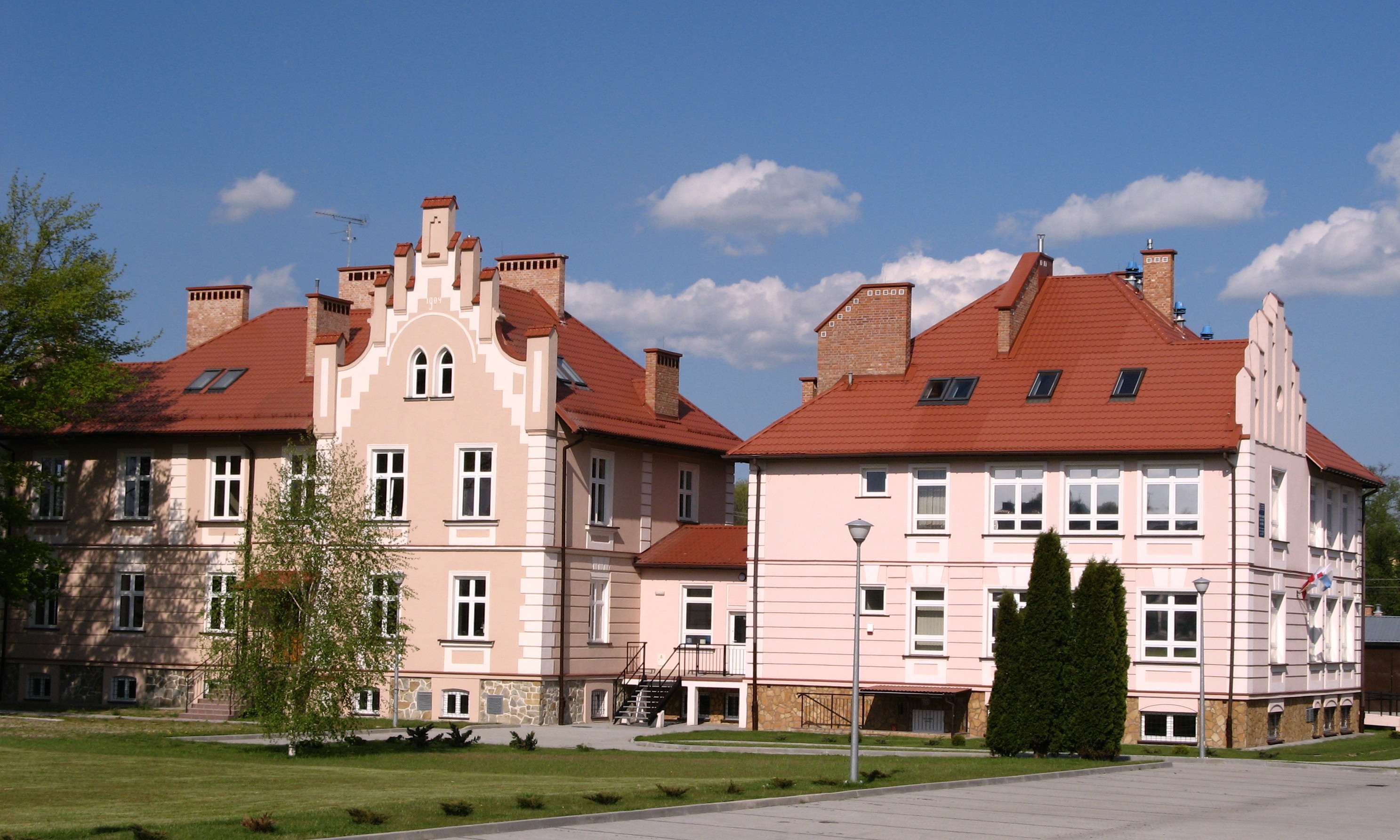
University of Technology in Rzeszów, new biomedical laboratories in Albigowa; renovated century-old buildings.

Rzeszów University of Technology, also known as Rzeszów Polytechnic (Polish: Politechnika Rzeszowska im. Ignacego Łukasiewicza, PRz) or Ignacy Łukasiewicz University of Technology, is a state-run institution of higher education in Rzeszów, Poland. According to international ranking by the Webometrics Ranking of World Universities published by the Spanish institute Consejo Superior de Investigaciones Científicas, the university was ranked 14th among the technical universities in Poland and, internationally, at number 1,173 among all listed universities.

Rzeszów Polytechnic began as a vocational school of engineering on the initiative of employees of the airplane factory PZL WS-2 (branch of PZL State Aviation Works) in 1951. It developed into a full-fledged university gradually between 1952 and 1974. Since 1976, it has operated the leading Aviation Training Centre on the outskirts of Rzeszow. The university is the only polytechnic in the country that awards degrees to civil aviation pilots.

Students of the university have had multiple successes in various international competitions, including University Rover Challenge. In 2015 the university won the competition.

== Faculties and studies ==
- Civil and Environmental Engineering (Wydział Budownictwa i Inżynierii Środowiska)
1. Architecture (Architektura)
2. Civil Engineering (Budownictwo)
3. Environmental Engineering (Inżynieria Środowiska)
4. Environmental Protection (Ochrona Środowiska)
- Mechanical Engineering and Aeronautics (Wydział Budowy Maszyn i Lotnictwa)
1. Materials Engineering (Inżynieria Materiałowa)
2. Aerospace Engineering (Lotnictwo i Kosmonautyka)
3. Mechanics and Mechanical Engineering (Mechanika i Budowa Maszyn)
4. Mechatronics (Mechatronika)
5. Transport (Transport)
6. Management and Engineering of Production (Zarządzanie i Inżynieria Produkcji)
- Chemistry (Wydział Chemiczny)
1. Biotechnology (Biotechnologia)
2. Chemical Engineering (Inżynieria Chemiczna i Procesowa)
3. Chemical Technology (Technologia Chemiczna)
- Electrical and Computer Engineering (Wydział Elektrotechniki i Informatyki)
1. Automatic Control and Robotics (Automatyka i Robotyka)
2. Electronics and Telecommunications (Elektronika i Telekomunikacja)
3. Electrical Engineering (Elektrotechnika)
4. Power Engineering (Energetyka)
5. Computer Engineering (Informatyka)
- Mathematics and Applied Physics (Wydział Matematyki i Fizyki Stosowanej)
1. Mathematics (Matematyka)
2. Data Analysis and Engineering (Inżynieria i Analiza Danych)
3. Medical Engineering (Inżynieria Medyczna)
- Management (Wydział Zarządzania)
1. Security (Bezpieczeństwo Wewnętrzne)
2. Finances and Accounting (Finanse i Rachunkowość)
3. Logistics (Logistyka)
4. Management (Zarządzanie)
- Mechanical Engineering and Technology (Wydział Mechaniczno-Technologiczny)
1. Mechanics and Mechanical Engineering (Mechanika i Budowa Maszyn)
2. Production Management and Engineering (Zarządzanie i Inżynieria Produkcji)
- Outside branches (Jednostki pozawydziałowe)
1. The Aviation Training Centre (Ośrodek Kształcenia Lotniczego)
2. The University Gliding Centre in Bezmiechowa (Akademicki Ośrodek Szybowcowy w Bezmiechowej)
3. The Department of Foreign Languages ( Studium Języków Obcych)
4. Physiotherapy and Sports Centre (Centrum Fizjoterapii i Sportu)
