= Rossio Tunnel =

Rossio Tunnel is a railway infrastructure that allows access to Rossio railway station in the center of Lisbon, in Portugal, from Campolide railway station, making the first segment of the Sintra Line.

== Description ==
=== Infrastructure ===
The tunnels are both 2613 meters in length (about the same length as the 25 de Abril Bridge), the profile of the tunnel is 8 meters wide and 6 meters tall at the top of the vaulted ceiling. The tunnel has a slope of approximately 1%, descending 24.26 meters from the entrance of the tunnel in Campolide until the exit at Rossio railway station. This tunnel is the only heavy rail (train) connection to downtown Lisbon (Baixa de Lisboa), passing under urban streets and buildings already built before construction began. The vertical distance between the top of the tunnel vault and the surface is not all the same:

Vertical distances of important roads that tunnel crosses:

- 11 m – Avenida Calouste Gulbenkian
- 62.5 m – Rua Marquês da Fronteira
- 57.1 m – Avenida Engenheiro Duarte Pacheco (Túnel do Marquês)
- 26.5 m – Rua Braamcamp
- 3 m – Lisbon Metro Yellow Line
- 2 m – Calçada da Glória (Elevador da Glória)

== History ==
=== Background ===
On 28 September 1856, the first section of railway opened in Portugal, connecting the east of Lisbon to Carregado. In 1887 a new railway network opened connecting the Alcântara region, in the western part of Lisbon, to Sintra and the west coast. Both lines were run by Portuguese Railway Company, so plans were begun to make a third railway in Lisbon to connect both lines. A declaration on 23 July 1888 authorized this third railway line and a branch that would connect it to a new urban station in the centre of Lisbon (soon to be Rossio railway station) which was to be built in Terreiro do Duque. The railway between Benfica, on the Linha do Oeste (Sintra Line) and Santa Apolónia, on the Linha do Leste (in the future, Linha do Norte), entered into service on 20 May 1888.

=== Construction and opening ===
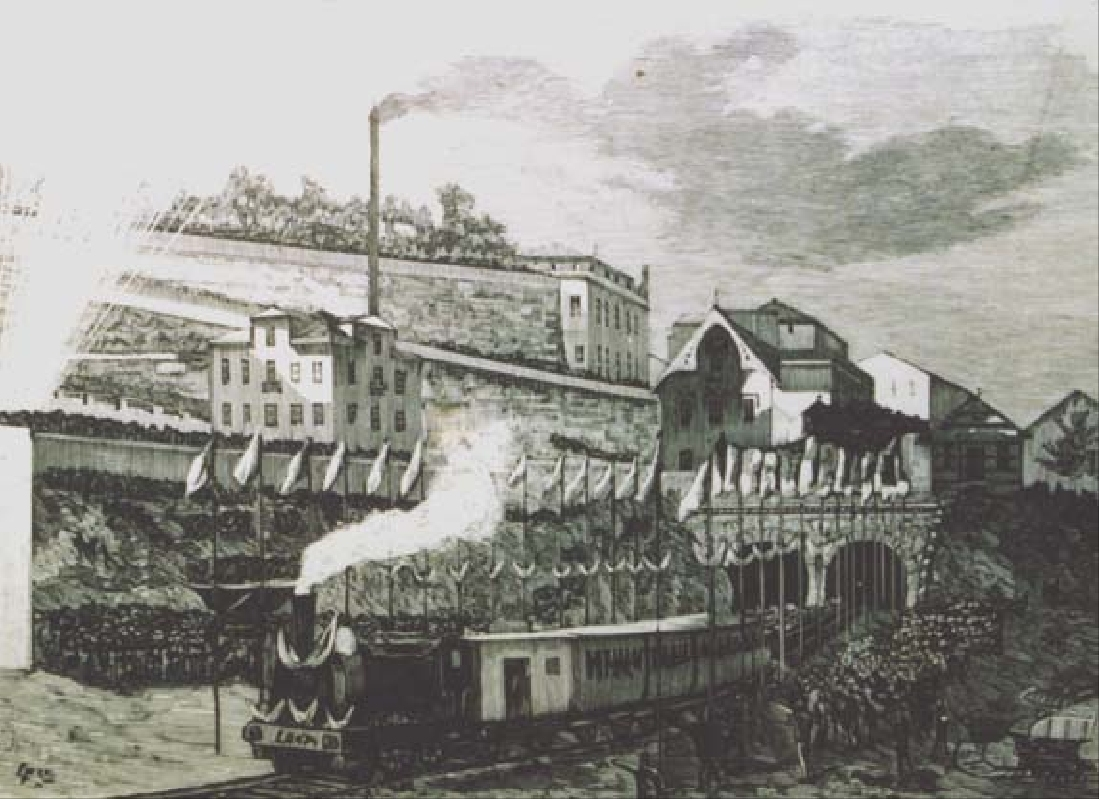
Inauguration of Rossio Tunnel on 8 April 1889

The geology studies for the tunnel were done by professor Paul Choffat. In April 1889, the drilling of the tunnel was completed and the construction of Rossio station was already underway. The tunnel itself opened on the 8th of April with the organization of a special train between Campolide and Rossio stations, taking the employees and leaders of the Royal Railway Company of Portugal along with various guests. However, the final opening of the tunnel and station happened in May 1891, with both starting service on the 11th of June that year.

=== 20th century ===
Installation of lights in the tunnel was included in the budget of the Portuguese Railway Company for 1902. It was expected that electricity would come from generators at Rossio station, would likely need to increase power to operate this service. It was expected that this addition would lead to more electrical equipment like track switches, cranes, elevators and baggage conveyors. The tunnel was expected to change to electric power, likely through a third rail installation which would allow replacement of steam locomotives whose pollution caused significant discomfort to passengers both inside the train and in the station.

In 1916, the series 070-097 entered service, specifically to serve the tram service between Rossio railway station and Sintra railway station, via Rossio Tunnel.

=== 21st century ===
The tunnel was closed to traffic between 22 October 2004 and 16 February 2008 for maintenance and rehabilitation.

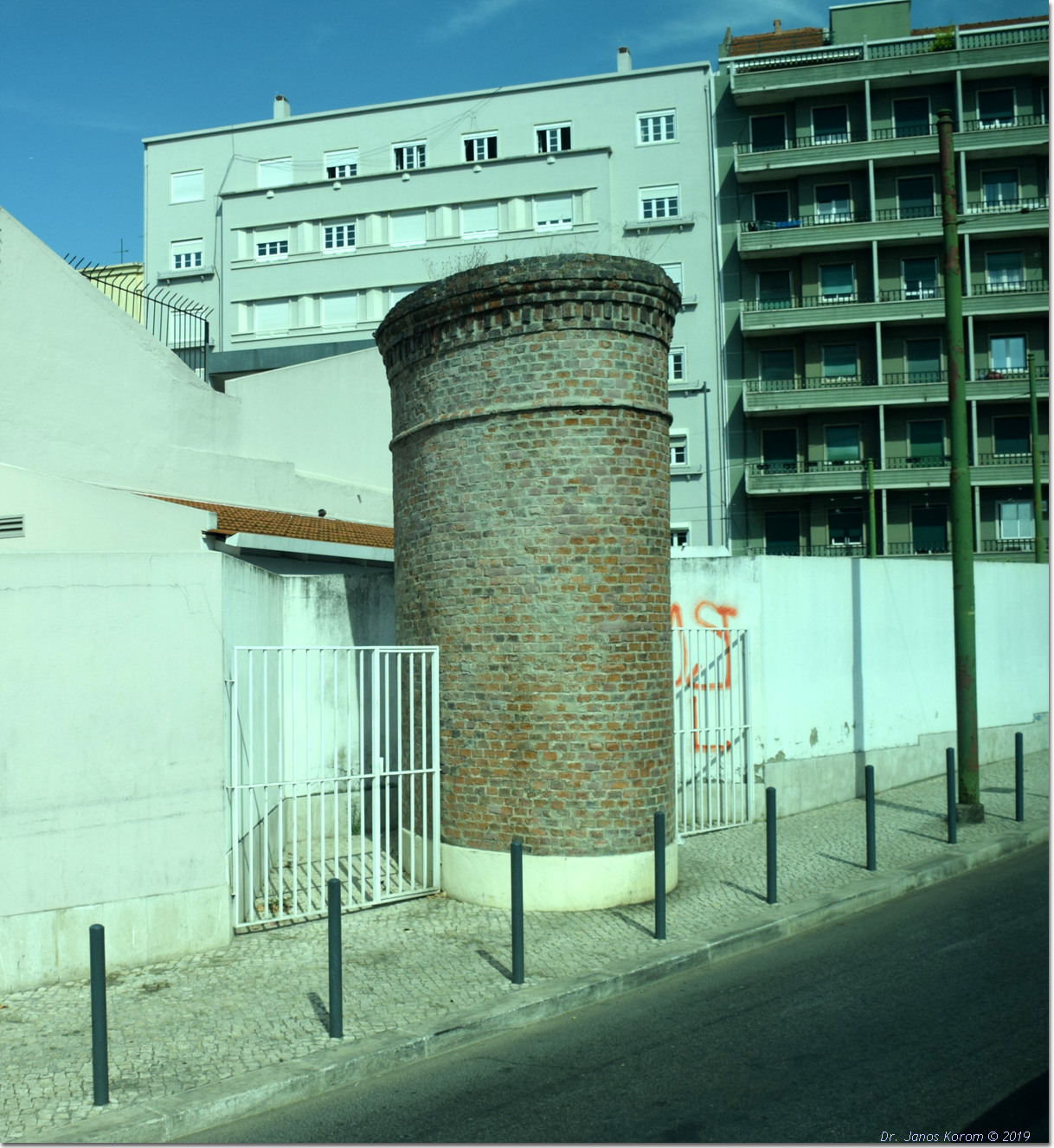
Ventilation shaft in Campolide (at Av. Cons. F. de Sousa × R. Mq. Fronteira).

The rehabilitation works required a new structural lining of reinforced concrete in critical sections. The works also added a concrete track platform with embedded rails for the entire length of the tunnel to allow easy access for service or rescue vehicles. Because of these works, the Ascensor da Glória was stopped between April 2006 and February 2007, because of fear of collapse on the land between Calçada da Glória and Rua Artilharia.

During the works, a SysTunnel monitoring system was installed to measure deformations, convergences and temperature in different sections of the tunnel using only fiber optic sensors. 109 sections of instrumentation were installed in the tunnel, including 763 strain sensors and 109 temperature sensors.

The tunnel has an escape shaft to the surface about halfway in the tunnel, near the interception of Rua Alexandre Herculano.

== Services ==
From the end of the 20th century, Rossio station began to regularly serve suburban trains on the Linha de Sintra. Since 1992, these were done using Series 2300 and 2400 electric trains, temporarily replaced at the end of 2013 with Series 3500 double decker trains.

== See also ==
- Linha de Sintra
- Estação Ferroviária do Rossio
- Infraestruturas de Portugal

== Bibliography ==
- Martins, João; Brion, Madalena; Sousa, Miguel; et al. (1996). O Caminho de Ferro Revisitado. Caminhos de Ferro Portugueses. p. 446.

== Citation ==
- Do Rossio a Campolide: A Reabilitação de um Túnel e de uma Estação com História. Rede Ferroviária Nacional. 2008.
