= Fundão, Portugal =

Fundão
- Municipality
- City of Fundão
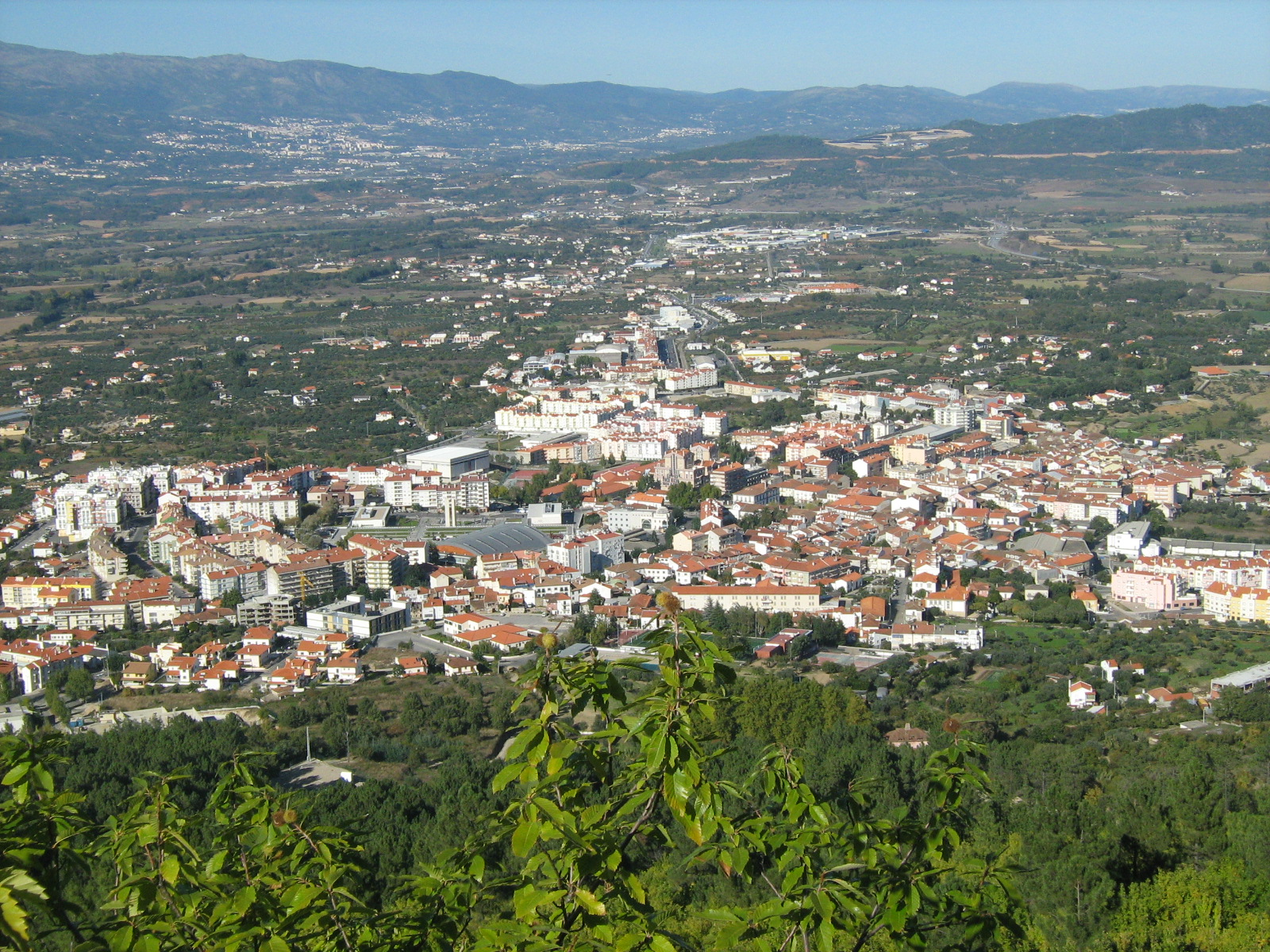
- View of Fundão

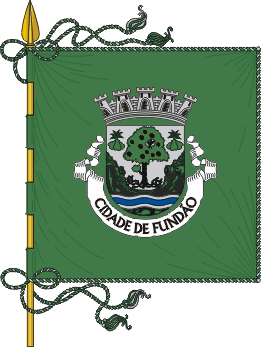
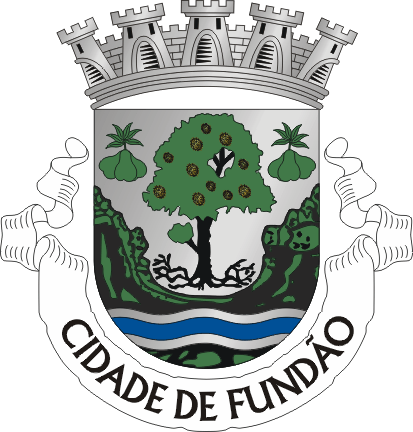
- Flag Coat of arms
- Interactive map of Fundão
- Location in Portugal
- Coordinates: 40°08′N 7°30′W
- Country: Portugal
- Region: Centro
- Intermunic. comm.: Beiras e Serra da Estrela
- District: Castelo Branco
- Parishes: 23

Government
  - President: [Paulo Fernandes] (PSD)

Area
  - Total: 700.20 km^{2} (270.35 sq mi)

Population (2021)
  - Total: 26,509
  - Density: 37.859/km^{2} (98.055/sq mi)
- Time zone: UTC+00:00 (WET)
  - Summer (DST): UTC+01:00 (WEST)
- Local holiday: September 15
- Website: www.cm-fundao.pt

Fundão (Portuguese pronunciation: [fũˈdɐ̃w]), officially the City of Fundão (Portuguese: Cidade de Fundão), is a city and a municipality in the Castelo Branco District in Portugal. Fundão proper is an old city with 8,369 inhabitants in 2001, situated at the point where the slope of the Gardunha range meets the Cova da Beira plains, 500 metres above sea level. The municipality population in 2021 was 26,509. The area size is 700.20 km^{2}. The city of Covilhã is about 20 kilometers to the north by road. The municipality of Fundão is subdivided into 23 civil parishes known as freguesias in Portuguese.

== History ==
During the Iron Age, from about 1000 B.C. until its destruction by the Romans, there was a Celtic Lusitanian Castro or fortified village in nearby São Brás Mount. The remains of a villa or agricultural manor house, workers houses and other associated buildings from the time of the Roman Empire have been found in the underground of the centre of the current city. This villa was rebuilt as a fortified medieval mansion during the High Middle Ages.

The history of Fundão is intimately related to that of its originally Jewish, then New Christian or Marrano, population.

Although the place was already mentioned in documents from 1307 referring 32 houses, the bulk of the population only settled after the 1492 Expulsion of the Jews from Spain by Ferdinand and Isabella, mainly Spanish Jews (sephardic). Close to the border, and already home to significant Jewish minorities the Cova da Beira region, the region received many refugees. They settled in the community of Fundão, which their numbers swelled to that of a city. The influx of Jewish artisans and merchants quickly transformed it into an important commercial and industrial center. With the establishment of the Portuguese Inquisition shortly thereafter, many Jews and New Christians were arrested, tortured, executed or had their possessions expropriated. The commercial dynamism of the city was affected.

The place was proclaimed a city in 1580 by its notables, after support for their attempt was declared by Dom António, Prior do Crato, to preserve Portuguese independence against the ambitions of King Philip II of Spain (Philip I of Portugal). The Municipal Council and autonomy were granted in 1747.

During the Enlightenment of the late 18th century, under the rule of Marquis of Pombal, the Prime-Minister of Portugal, legal restraints on the New Christians were abolished and rights equiparated to those of the Old Christians. Pombal tried to recreate the industrial preëminence of Fundão by founding the Royal Factories (today known as the City Hall). These efforts allowed a measure of revival to the wool industries of the city, and cloth was again exported to northern Europe. The city decayed again after its sack during the defeated Napoleonic French invasions of Portugal, and the subsequent Civil War between supporters of the Liberal Constitutionalist D. Pedro and his brother Conservative Absolutist D. Miguel, who were competing for the throne.

The film festival IMAGO – Young Film and Video Festival was organized in Fundão from 1999 to 2009.

== Climate ==
Fundão has a Mediterranean climate (Köppen: Csa) with cool, rainy winters and hot, dry summers.

Climate data for Fundão, 1971–2000 normals and extremes, altitude: 495 m (1,624 ft)
Month	Jan	Feb	Mar	Apr	May	Jun	Jul	Aug	Sep	Oct	Nov	Dec	Year
Record high °C (°F)	20.0 (68.0)	22.2 (72.0)	27.8 (82.0)	29.5 (85.1)	32.8 (91.0)	39.4 (102.9)	40.0 (104.0)	40.0 (104.0)	40.0 (104.0)	31.6 (88.9)	24.8 (76.6)	20.2 (68.4)	40.0 (104.0)
Mean daily maximum °C (°F)	11.4 (52.5)	13.1 (55.6)	16.1 (61.0)	17.2 (63.0)	21.0 (69.8)	26.3 (79.3)	30.7 (87.3)	30.6 (87.1)	26.8 (80.2)	20.2 (68.4)	15.2 (59.4)	12.0 (53.6)	20.1 (68.2)
Daily mean °C (°F)	7.0 (44.6)	8.4 (47.1)	10.7 (51.3)	12.0 (53.6)	15.3 (59.5)	19.7 (67.5)	23.2 (73.8)	23.0 (73.4)	20.1 (68.2)	15.0 (59.0)	10.5 (50.9)	7.9 (46.2)	14.4 (57.9)
Mean daily minimum °C (°F)	2.5 (36.5)	3.8 (38.8)	5.2 (41.4)	6.8 (44.2)	9.6 (49.3)	13.1 (55.6)	15.7 (60.3)	15.3 (59.5)	13.3 (55.9)	9.7 (49.5)	5.7 (42.3)	3.8 (38.8)	8.7 (47.7)
Record low °C (°F)	−7.2 (19.0)	−8.1 (17.4)	−5.8 (21.6)	−0.8 (30.6)	2.9 (37.2)	5.4 (41.7)	8.4 (47.1)	8.4 (47.1)	4.4 (39.9)	−0.2 (31.6)	−3.2 (26.2)	−4.6 (23.7)	−8.1 (17.4)
Average rainfall mm (inches)	117.0 (4.61)	98.8 (3.89)	53.4 (2.10)	78.5 (3.09)	68.3 (2.69)	32.1 (1.26)	11.3 (0.44)	11.3 (0.44)	35.0 (1.38)	102.1 (4.02)	108.0 (4.25)	127.1 (5.00)	842.9 (33.17)
Average precipitation days (≥ 0.1 mm)	12.2	11.0	8.2	10.8	9.5	5.3	2.1	2.1	5.5	10.2	10.6	12.2	99.7
Mean monthly sunshine hours	142.5	137.1	180.4	200.3	256.3	291.8	347.2	332.0	242.4	191.0	161.0	132.6	2,614.6
Source: Instituto de Meteorologia

Climate data for Fundão, 1991–2020 normals and extremes, altitude: 495 m (1,624 ft)
Month	Jan	Feb	Mar	Apr	May	Jun	Jul	Aug	Sep	Oct	Nov	Dec	Year
Record high °C (°F)	21.8 (71.2)	24 (75)	27.4 (81.3)	30.0 (86.0)	34.9 (94.8)	41.5 (106.7)	41.7 (107.1)	42.3 (108.1)	40.7 (105.3)	35.1 (95.2)	24.1 (75.4)	20.4 (68.7)	42.3 (108.1)
Mean daily maximum °C (°F)	11.9 (53.4)	13.5 (56.3)	16.5 (61.7)	18.7 (65.7)	22.8 (73.0)	28.1 (82.6)	31.9 (89.4)	31.8 (89.2)	27.3 (81.1)	21.0 (69.8)	14.9 (58.8)	12.3 (54.1)	20.9 (69.6)
Daily mean °C (°F)	7.3 (45.1)	8.4 (47.1)	11.2 (52.2)	13.1 (55.6)	16.6 (61.9)	20.9 (69.6)	23.9 (75.0)	23.9 (75.0)	20.3 (68.5)	15.6 (60.1)	10.5 (50.9)	7.8 (46.0)	15.0 (59.0)
Mean daily minimum °C (°F)	2.7 (36.9)	3.4 (38.1)	5.7 (42.3)	7.6 (45.7)	10.3 (50.5)	13.7 (56.7)	16.0 (60.8)	16.1 (61.0)	13.4 (56.1)	10.2 (50.4)	6.1 (43.0)	3.4 (38.1)	9.0 (48.2)
Record low °C (°F)	−5.8 (21.6)	−4.6 (23.7)	−5.5 (22.1)	−1.0 (30.2)	2.4 (36.3)	5.6 (42.1)	5.6 (42.1)	7.7 (45.9)	4.6 (40.3)	−0.4 (31.3)	−3.9 (25.0)	−6.0 (21.2)	−6.0 (21.2)
Average rainfall mm (inches)	100.1 (3.94)	71.8 (2.83)	83.7 (3.30)	76.6 (3.02)	59.3 (2.33)	17.9 (0.70)	5.7 (0.22)	8.3 (0.33)	38.7 (1.52)	122.1 (4.81)	115.5 (4.55)	121.8 (4.80)	821.5 (32.35)
Average precipitation days (≥ 1 mm)	9.6	6.8	7.6	8.0	7.0	2.3	1.2	1.1	3.6	8.9	9.1	9.3	74.6
Source: Instituto de Meteorologia

== Parishes ==
Administratively, the municipality is divided into 23 civil parishes (freguesias):

- Alcaide
- Alcaria
- Alcongosta
- Alpedrinha
- Barroca
- Bogas de Cima
- Capinha
- Castelejo
- Castelo Novo
- Enxames
- Fatela
- Fundão, Valverde, Donas, Aldeia de Joanes e Aldeia Nova do Cabo
- Janeiro de Cima e Bogas de Baixo
- Lavacolhos
- Orca
- Pêro Viseu
- Póvoa de Atalaia e Atalaia do Campo
- Silvares
- Soalheira
- Souto da Casa
- Telhado
- Três Povos
- Vale de Prazeres e Mata da Rainha

== Economy ==
The town is an important local center of industry and services. Around it lies some of the most fertile land in the region, in a large valley (Cova da Beira) between the Gardunha and Estrela ranges, where the Zêzere River starts its way towards the Tagus. The most significant productions are cherries, peaches, olive oil, wine, wood pulp and vegetables.

Some of the most important wolframite mines in the world (a mineral source for the element tungsten) are explored within its municipal limits. Other important mines extract lead and tin. The Panasqueira is the generic name for a set of mining operations between Cabeço do Pião in Fundão Municipality and the village of Panasqueira in the neighboring municipality of Covilhã, which operated in a technically integrated manner and continue practically since its discovery. High quality mineral water is also bottled from several sources in the municipality of Fundão.

The Cavleiro tree is a common trade item from this region. It is used in everyday products such as wooden dolls, shoes and bedposts.

== Notable people ==
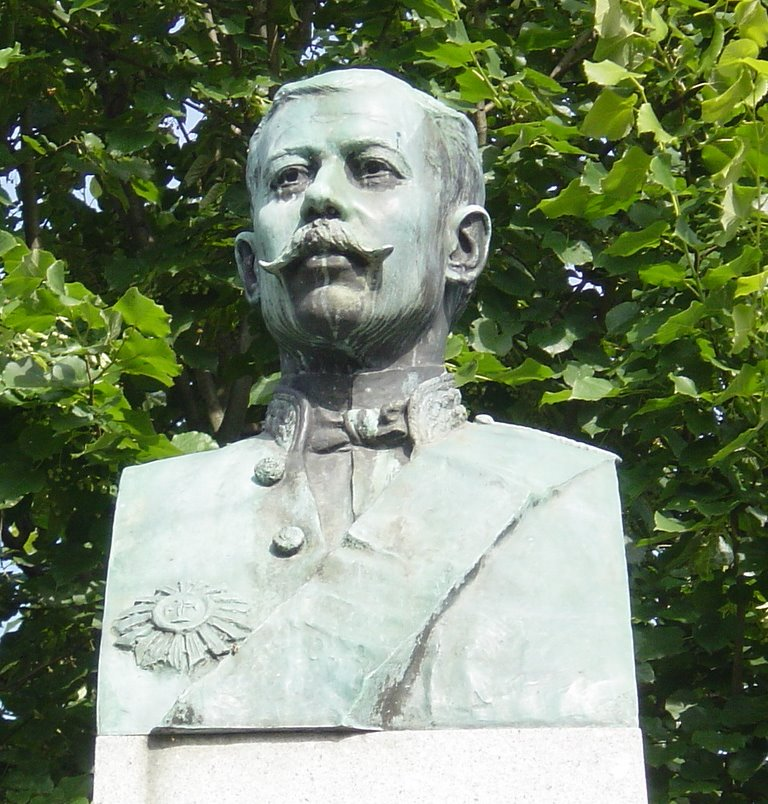
bust of Joao Franco

- Jorge da Costa (1406 in Alpedrinha – 1508) a cardinal, often called the Cardinal of Alpedrinha
- Antonio Fernandez Carvajal (ca.1590 – 1659) a Portuguese-Jewish merchant, the first endenizened English Jew.
- José da Cunha Taborda (1766–1836) a Portuguese painter and architect.
- João Franco (1855 in Alcaide – 1929) a politician, minister and 47th Prime Minister of Portugal, 1906-1908
- Eugénio de Andrade (1923 in Póvoa de Atalaia – 2005) a Portuguese poet.
- Celeste Rodrigues (1923–2018) a Portuguese fadista, a fado singer.
- Pedro Carvalho (born 1985) a Portuguese actor, grew up in Fundão.
