= Gardunha =

Coordinates: 40°10′39″N 7°20′26″W

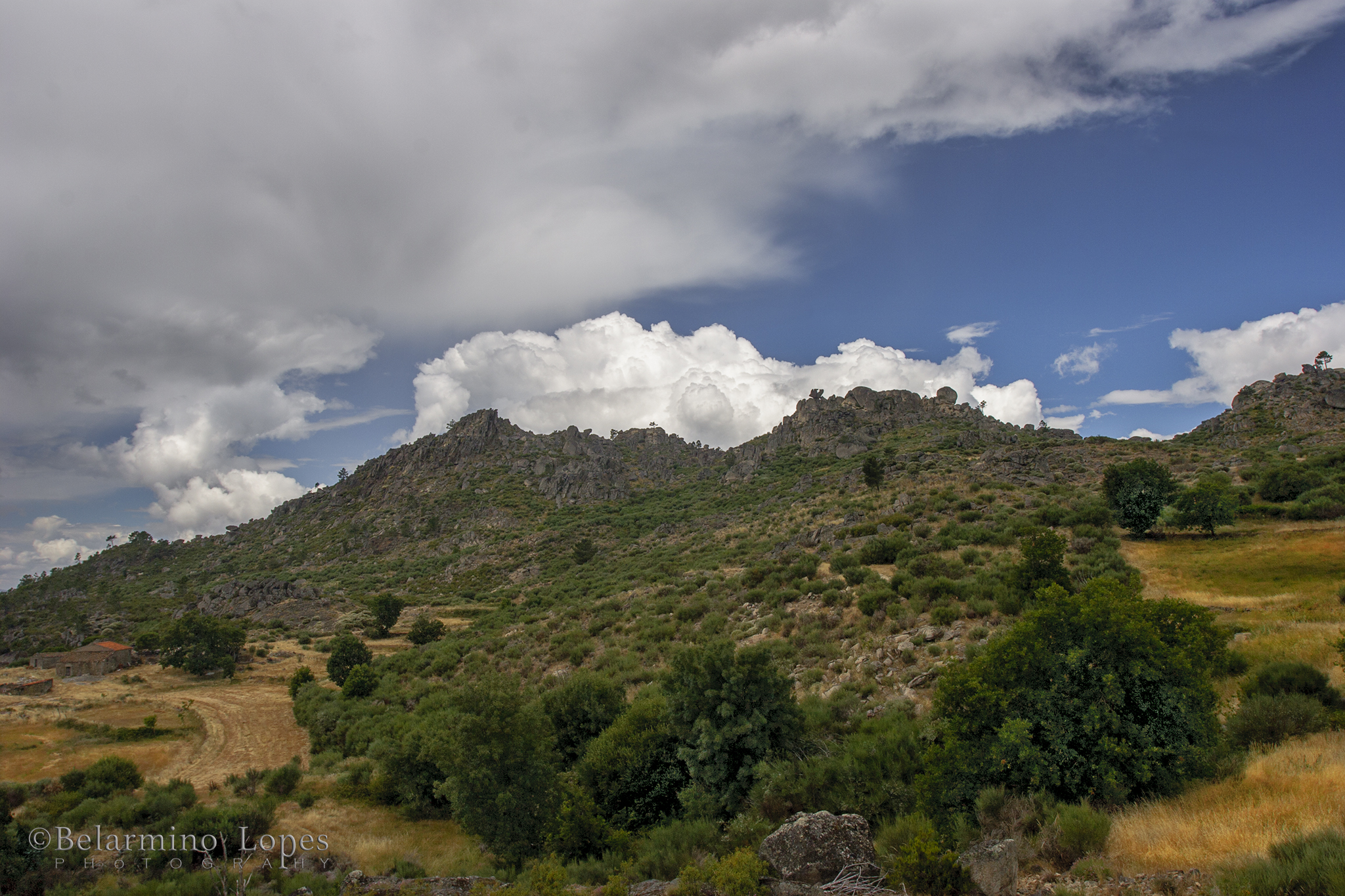
The mountain of Gardunha

The Gardunha mountain range (Serra da Gardunha), so called by the Moors (Gardunha or Guardunha meaning refuge), is located in central Portugal, in Centro Region, beyond the Serra da Estrela range, giving way to an extensive plain called Beira Baixa Province. It was covered with vineyards in the time of King Denis, who reigned in the 13th and 14th centuries. But the sovereign decided to pull them up and replace them with chestnut trees all over the Alcambar valley. The valley became known as the King's groves. Unfortunately though, due to man's negligence, violent fires destroyed a significant number of trees, although some areas were reforested. Pirâmide (1,223m/4,013ft), is the highest point in Gardunha mountain range.
