= List of Portuguese cattle breeds =

This is a list of the cattle breeds usually considered to have originated in Portugal.

Name	Notes	Image
Alentejana^{[1]}^{[2]}^{[3]}		
Algarvia^{[1]}^{[3]}		
Arouquesa^{[1]}^{[2]}^{[3]}		
Barrosã^{[1]}^{[2]}^{[3]}		
Brava de Lide^{[1]}^{[2]}		
Brava dos Açores^{[1]}		
Cachena^{[1]}^{[2]}		
Garvonesa^{[1]}^{[2]}^{[3]}		
Jarmelista^{[1]}		
Marinhoa^{[1]}^{[2]}^{[3]}		
Maronesa^{[1]}^{[2]}^{[3]}		
Mertolenga^{[1]}^{[2]}^{[3]}		
Minhota^{[1]}^{[2]}^{[3]}		
Mirandesa^{[1]}^{[2]}		
Preta^{[1]}^{[2]}^{[3]}		
Ramo Grande^{[1]}^{[2]}		
