= Preta (cattle breed) =

Portuguese breed of cattle

- Conservation status: Relatório Nacional (2004): at risk; FAO (2007): not at risk; DAD-IS (2026): at risk/endangered-maintained
- Country of origin: Portugal
- Distribution: Évora; Portalegre; Santarém; Setúbal
- Standard: Direção Geral de Alimentação e Veterinária (in Portuguese)
- Use: formerly draught, now meat

Traits
- Weight: Male: average 950 kg; Female: average 525 kg
- Skin colour: pigmented
- Coat: usually black, also brown or brindled
- Horn status: horned
- Cattle; Bos (primigenius) taurus

The Preta is a Portuguese breed of beef cattle. It originates in the Charneca, that part of the historic province of Ribatejo lying south of the River Tagus, and was for that reason known in the past as the Charnequeiro do Sul do Tejo. It was also formerly known as the Gado da Terra ('cattle of the land') or Gado Preto ('black cattle'). A breed society was formed in 1990 and a herd-book was started in 1993.

== History ==
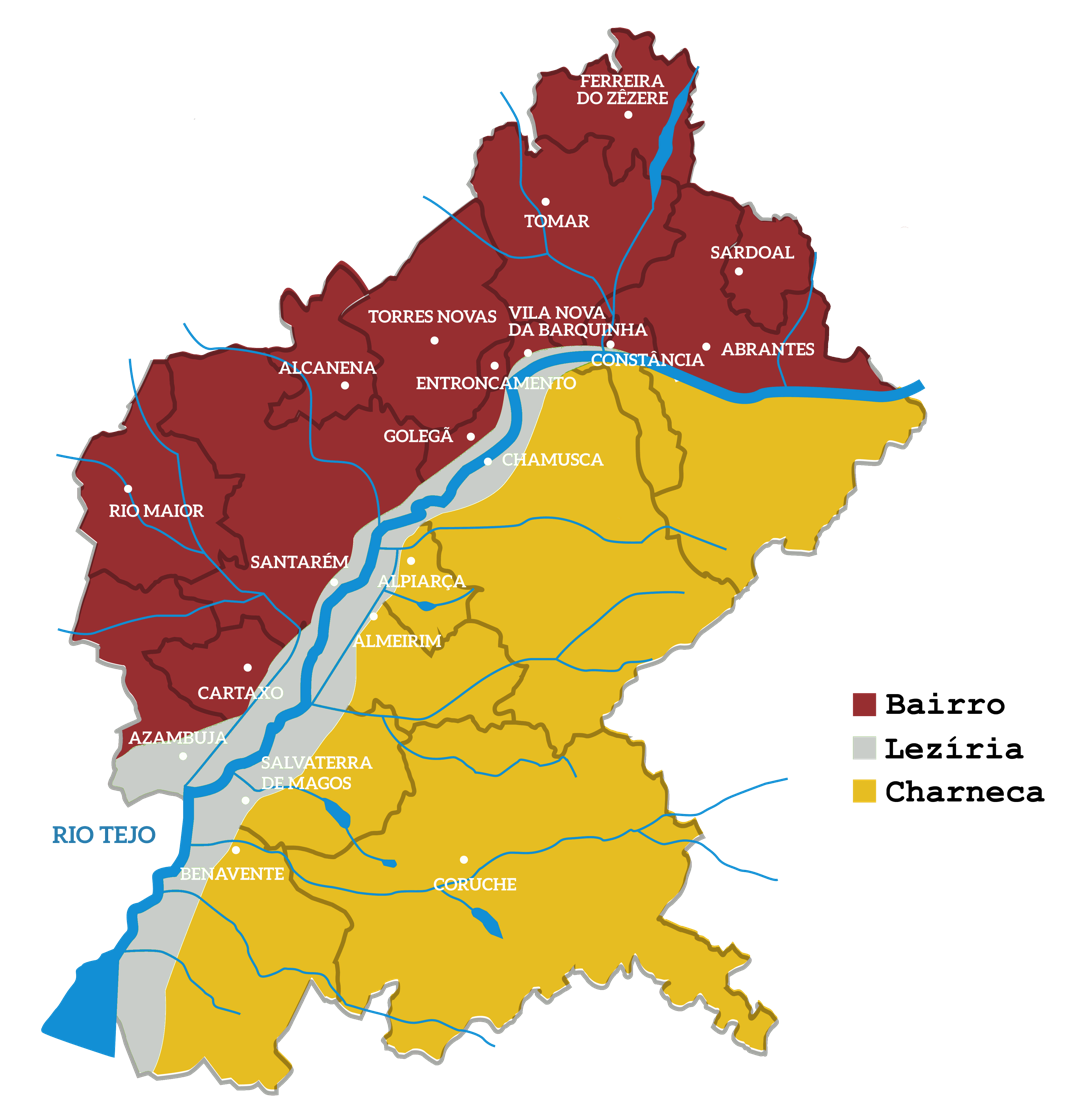
Map showing the Charneca (in yellow) within Ribatejo

From the mid-nineteenth century a mixed population of draught cattle was documented in the Charneca – the part of the historic province of Ribatejo that lies south of the River Tagus – as the Charnequeiro do Sul do Tejo. It later came to be known also as the Gado da Terra ('cattle of the land') or the Gado Preto ('black cattle'). From the early twentieth century these were selectively bred for consistency in order to develop them into a breed. Among the breeds which appear to have influenced this development are the Alentejana, the Brava de Lide (Portuguese fighting cattle), the Garvonesa and the Mirandesa; it is close to both the Avileña-Negra Ibérica and the Negra Andaluza breeds of Spain. The cattle in Alentejo differ in phenotype from those of Ribatejo; this is attributed to a stronger Spanish influence on the former.

With the mechanisation of agriculture in the years after the Second World War the Preta was no longer required for what had been its principal function: to work the soil. Numbers fell rapidly, and then fell further in the 1980s when large numbers of foreign cattle were imported to Portugal; the Preta came close to extinction, until some herds of pure-bred stock were identified. A breed society was formed in 1990 and a herd-book was started in 1993.

In 2004 its conservation status was listed in Portugal as 'at risk'; in 2007 it was listed by the Food and Agriculture Organization of the United Nations as 'not at risk'. In 2026 a population of between 5137 and 5734 head – with 2983 breeding cows and 60 bulls in service – was reported to DAD-IS, which listed its conservation status as 'at risk/endangered-maintained'.

== Characteristics ==
The Preta is usually black, but may also be brown or brindled; the mucosae are pigmented. Body weights vary from 400 to 600 kg for cows and 700 to 1000 kg for bulls; average heights at the withers are 165 cm and 185 cm respectively.

== Use ==
The Preta was formerly reared almost exclusively for draught use – it was more valued for the fertiliser it provided than for its meat. In the twenty-first century it is reared for beef. Meat produced in the districts of Évora, Portalegre, Santarém and Setúbal from cattle of this breed only may be marketed as Carne da Charneca, which has European Denominação de Origem Protegida status.

The cattle are almost invariably managed extensively; they forage well on crop residues and on the undergrowth of the montado – poor soil with holm oak and cork oak tree cover – of their area of distribution.
