= Bevo (mascot) =

Live mascot of the University of Texas at Austin

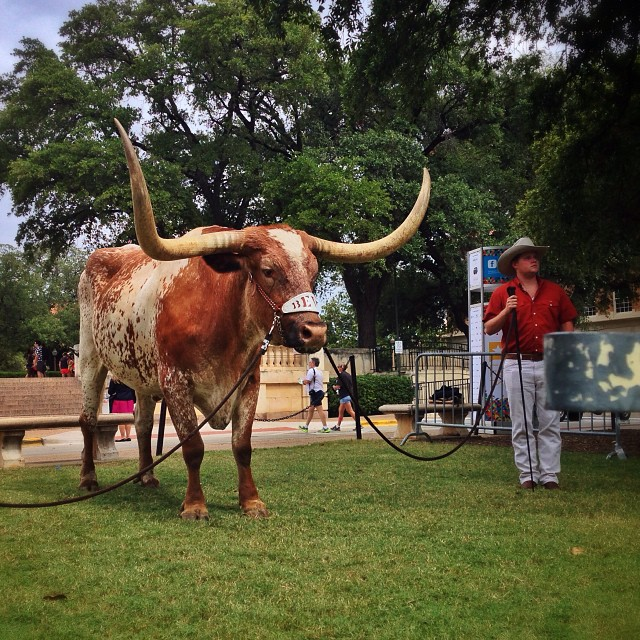
- Bevo XIV in 2013
- Team: Texas Longhorns
- University: University of Texas at Austin
- Conference: SEC
- Description: Texas longhorn
- Origin of name: Bevo, a malt beverage
- First seen: 1916
- Related mascot(s): Hook 'Em

Bevo is the live mascot of the athletic programs at The University of Texas at Austin. Bevo is a Texas Longhorn steer with burnt orange and white coloring from which the university derived its color scheme. The profile of the Longhorn's head and horns gives rise to the school's hand symbol and saying, "Hook 'em Horns". The most recent Bevo, Bevo XV, was introduced to Texas football fans on September 4, 2016. His predecessor, Bevo XIV, died of cancer on October 16, 2015.

== History ==
The idea to use a live longhorn as the university's mascot is attributed to UT alumnus Stephen Pinckney in 1916. Pinckney gathered $124 from other alumni to purchase a steer in the Texas Panhandle, which they originally named "Bo" and shipped to Austin.

A Longhorn steer was not the original mascot of the University of Texas. The original mascot was actually an American Pit Bull Terrier named "Pig".

=== Lineage ===
There have been fifteen Bevos to date. Bevo was originally named "Bo" but came to be called Bevo soon after his first appearance at Texas' 1916 Thanksgiving Day game. After the game, Ben Dyer (the campus magazine editor) declared, "His name is Bevo, and long may he reign!" Ben Dyer died before stating why he chose the name Bevo, but there are three theories. The first is that Bevo was named after an amber colored non-alcoholic beverage named Bevo (which, coincidentally, was introduced in 1916), and the other is that the name is derived from beeves, the plural form of beef. Another popular theory is that cadets from Texas A&M stole the mascot to brand 13–0, which was the score the Aggies had won by the year before. Faced with that dilemma, a UT student suggested combining the 1 and 3 to create a B, made an E out of the –, added a V, kept the 0 to create BEVO. This theory is apocryphal, as Bevo was named months before the branding actually happened.

The longest reigning Bevo was Bevo XIII, which was supplied to the university by John T. Baker, owner of the Sunrise Ranch in Liberty Hill, Texas. Baker is past president of the Texas Longhorn Breeders Association of America and serves as a judge in its competitions. Bevo XIII, originally named Sunrise Express, was a champion steer at the age of 3, before becoming the UT mascot. Bevo XIII became the mascot in 1988 and served 16 seasons on the sideline. He presided over 191 UT football games and attended the first inauguration of President George W. Bush in 2001. During his tenure, he presided over four (1990, 1994, 1995, 1996) conference football championships and a Heisman Trophy award for Ricky Williams. Bevo XIII was the winningest Bevo in UT history, and was replaced by youth grand champion Sunrise Studly, becoming Bevo XIV, at the September 4, 2004 football game versus the University of North Texas. It was the only time that two Bevos have ever appeared at the same football game. Bevo XIII was returned to Baker's ranch where he lived out the rest of his days in peace. Bevo XIII died on October 9, 2006, due to heart failure.

Bevo XIV attended George W. Bush's second inauguration in January 2005. He also attended the 2005 Rose Bowl win over Michigan as well as the 2006 Rose Bowl game in which the Longhorns won the 2005–2006 National Championship over USC. As of May 6, 2008, Bevo XIV weighed 1,800 pounds (820 kg), stood 5 feet 8 inches (1.7 m), and his horns measured 72 inches (183 cm) tip-to-tip. His birthday was April 8. At the 2008 Houston Livestock Show and Rodeo, he took home the honors of Reserve Grand Champion.

On October 13, 2015, it was announced that Bevo XIV retired after contracting bovine leukemia virus. He died on October 16, 2015.

On September 3, 2016, a young 19-month-old Bevo XV was unveiled at a special 100 year anniversary event at the University of Texas at Austin, celebrating 100 years of a live Bevo mascot.

== Mishaps by Bevo affecting others ==
Bevo II once charged an SMU cheerleader, who had to defend himself with his megaphone. Bevo III escaped from his enclosure and ran loose across campus for 2 days. Bevo IV once attacked a parked car, while Bevo V broke loose and scattered the Baylor band. Bevo XV broke free of handlers during the January 1, 2019 Sugar Bowl, scattering reporters as he almost reached the University of Georgia mascot Uga X, an English bulldog.

== Public appearances and traditions ==
Bevo is one of the most recognized college mascots and has even been called "the toughest-looking animal mascot in sports".

Bevo makes appearances at almost all home football games of the University of Texas, as well as many away games. He also typically makes appearances at important pep rallies, such as the ones in the weeks before the games against Texas A&M and Oklahoma. Following commencement ceremonies, he is typically on hand for photographs with graduates and their families.

Since 1945, the care of Bevo during his transportation and appearances has been entrusted to an honorary organization of undergraduate students called the Silver Spurs. Bevo rides in a special burnt orange livestock trailer with his name on the side.

Bevo is a steer, as an intact bull might be too dangerous in a crowded environment like a stadium. In 2002, an alumni group proposed that Bevo be given neuticles to "increase his masculinity".

During football games, he typically stands or sits placidly behind one of the end zones (the south end zone in Darrell K Royal–Texas Memorial Stadium) and is occasionally greeted by UT players when they score touchdowns. Bred to be docile, he is riled only in the most extreme of circumstances.

On the morning of December 25, 2014, Christmas Day, Longhorn Network aired a five-hour-long, "yule log"-styled special featuring footage of Bevo XIV at a ranch set to Christmas music.

== Gallery ==
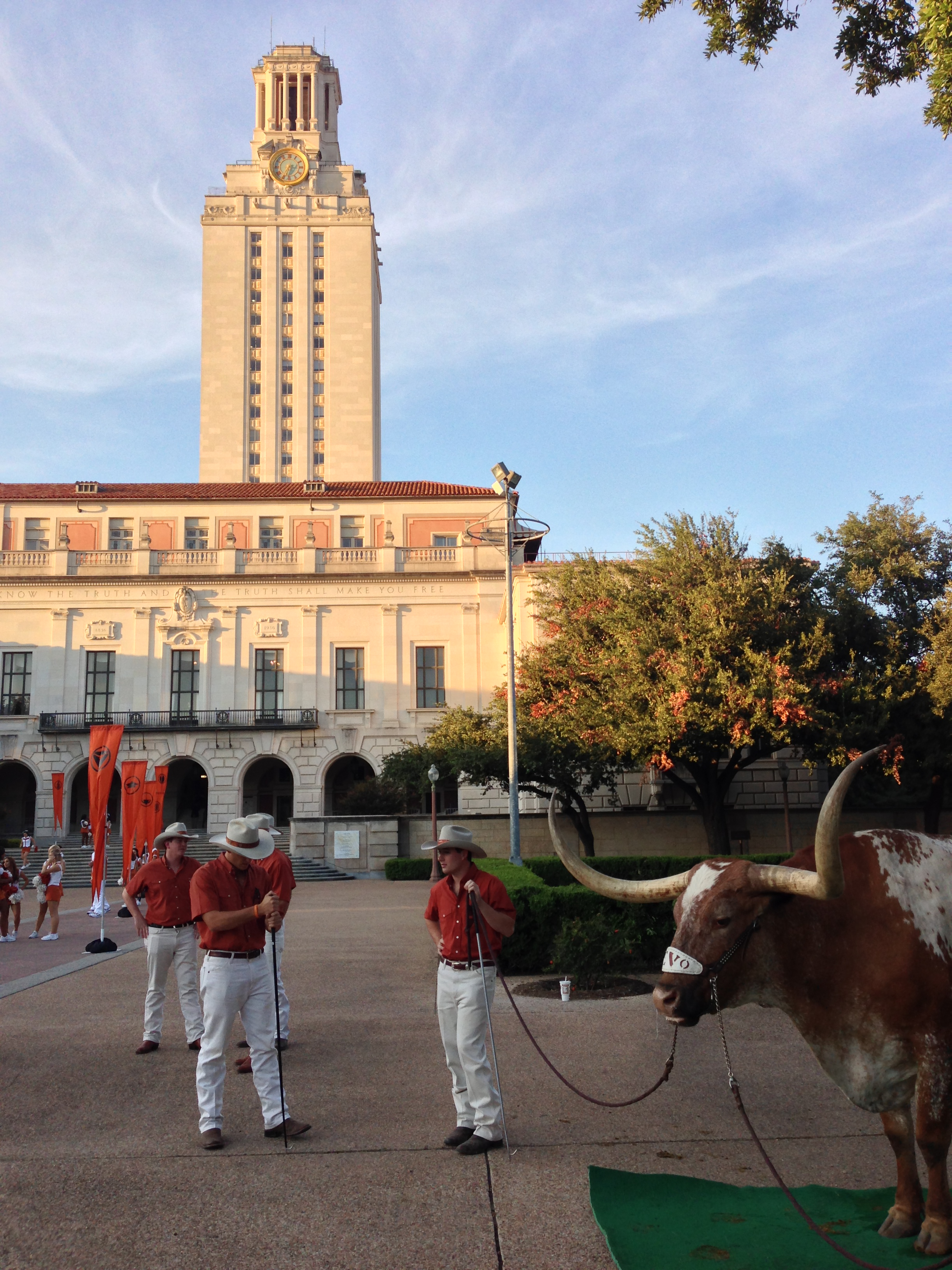
Bevo XIV at the Tower

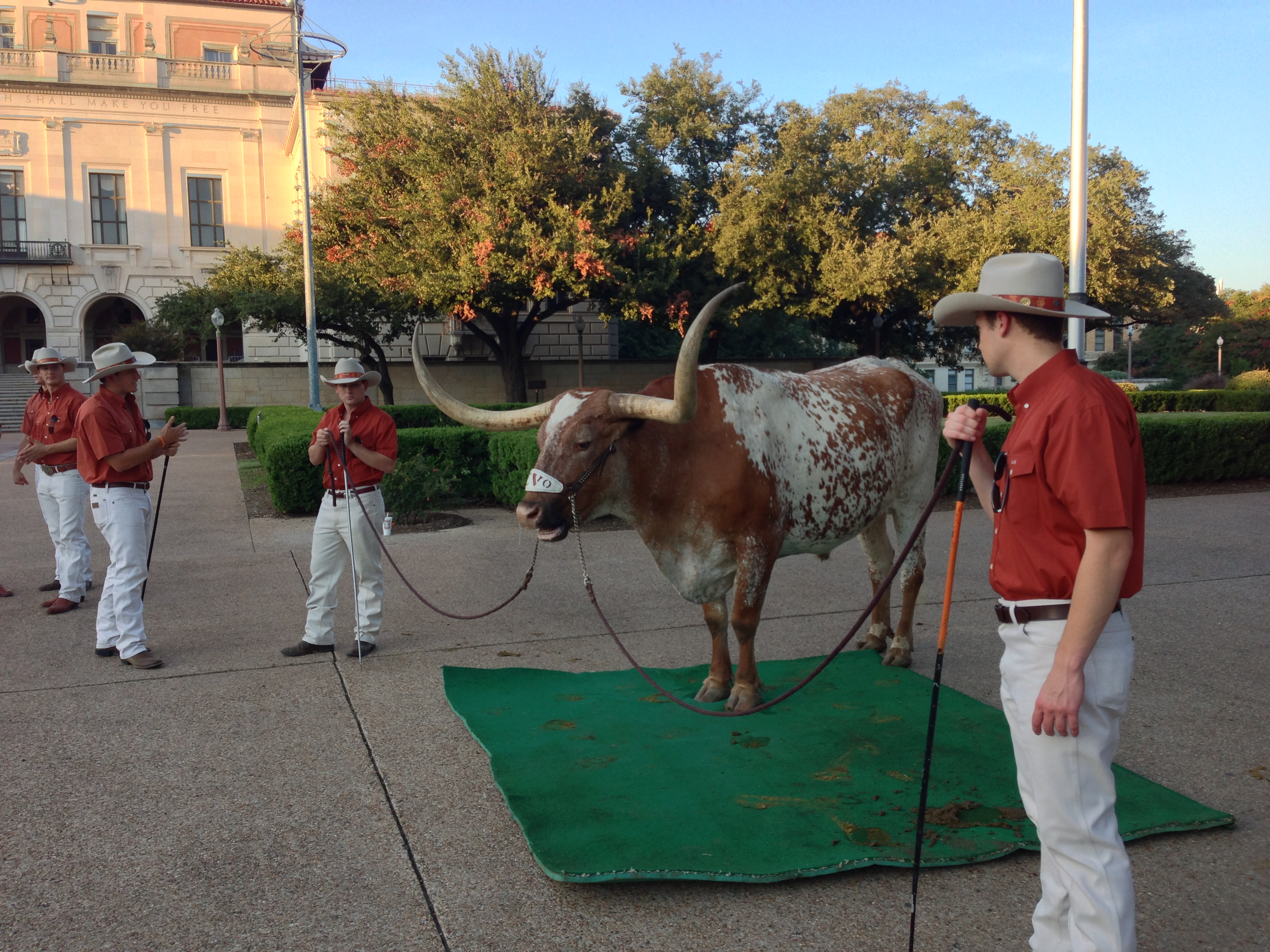
Bevo XIV with the Texas Silver Spurs

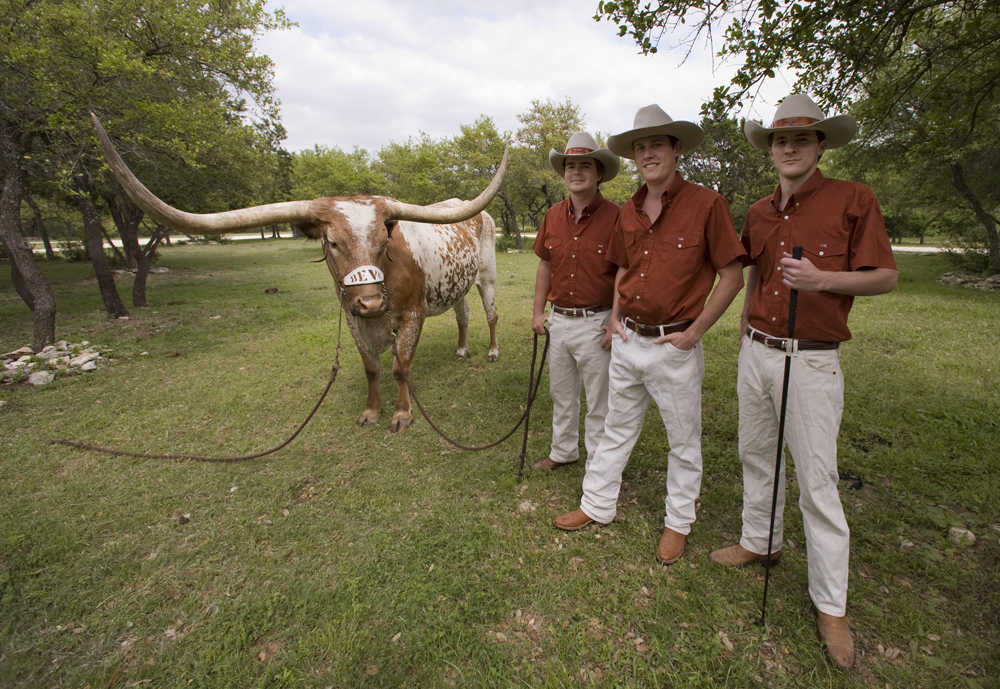
Bevo XIV with his Texas Silver Spurs Handlers

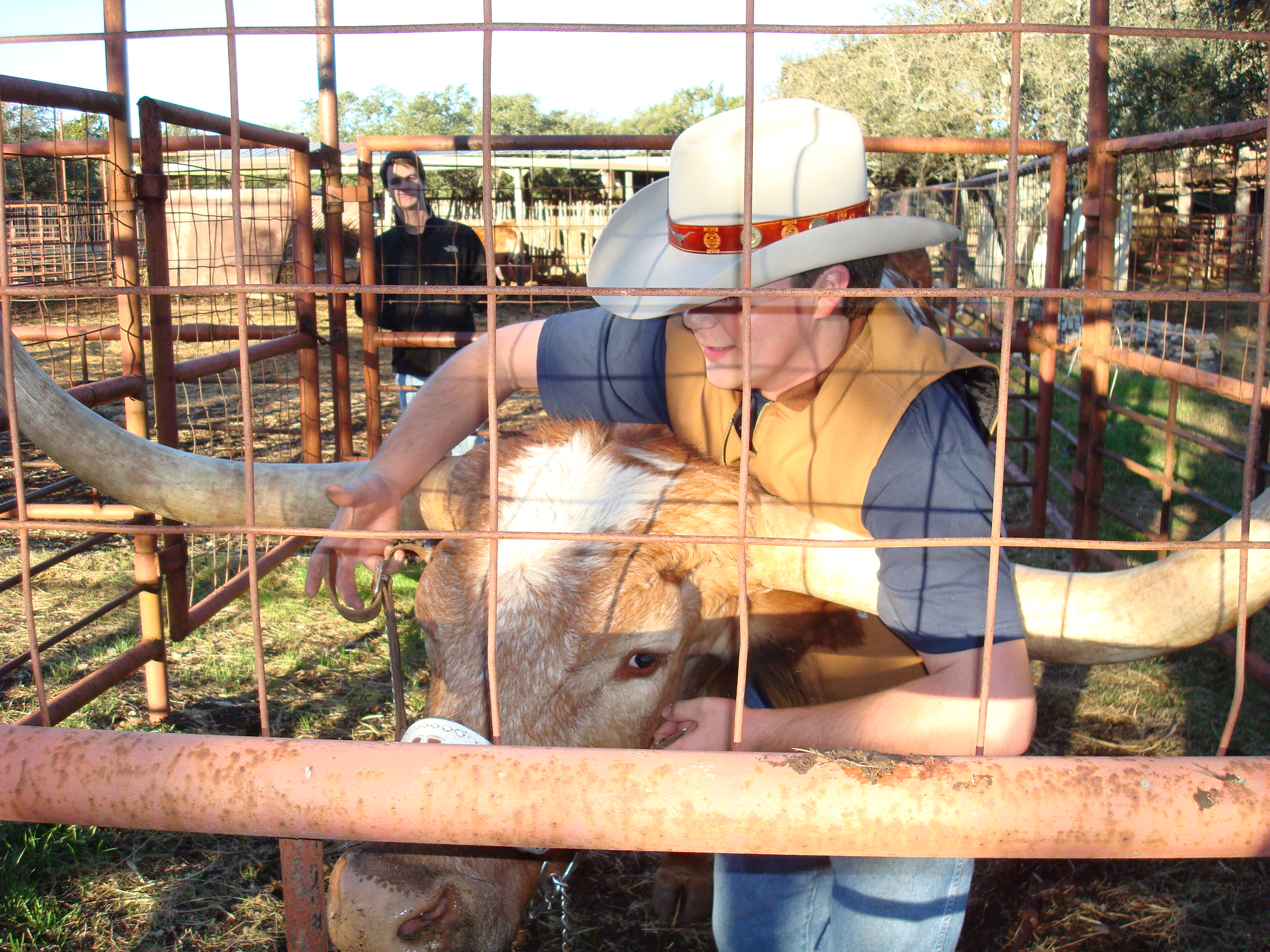
Bevo XIV being haltered by one of his handlers

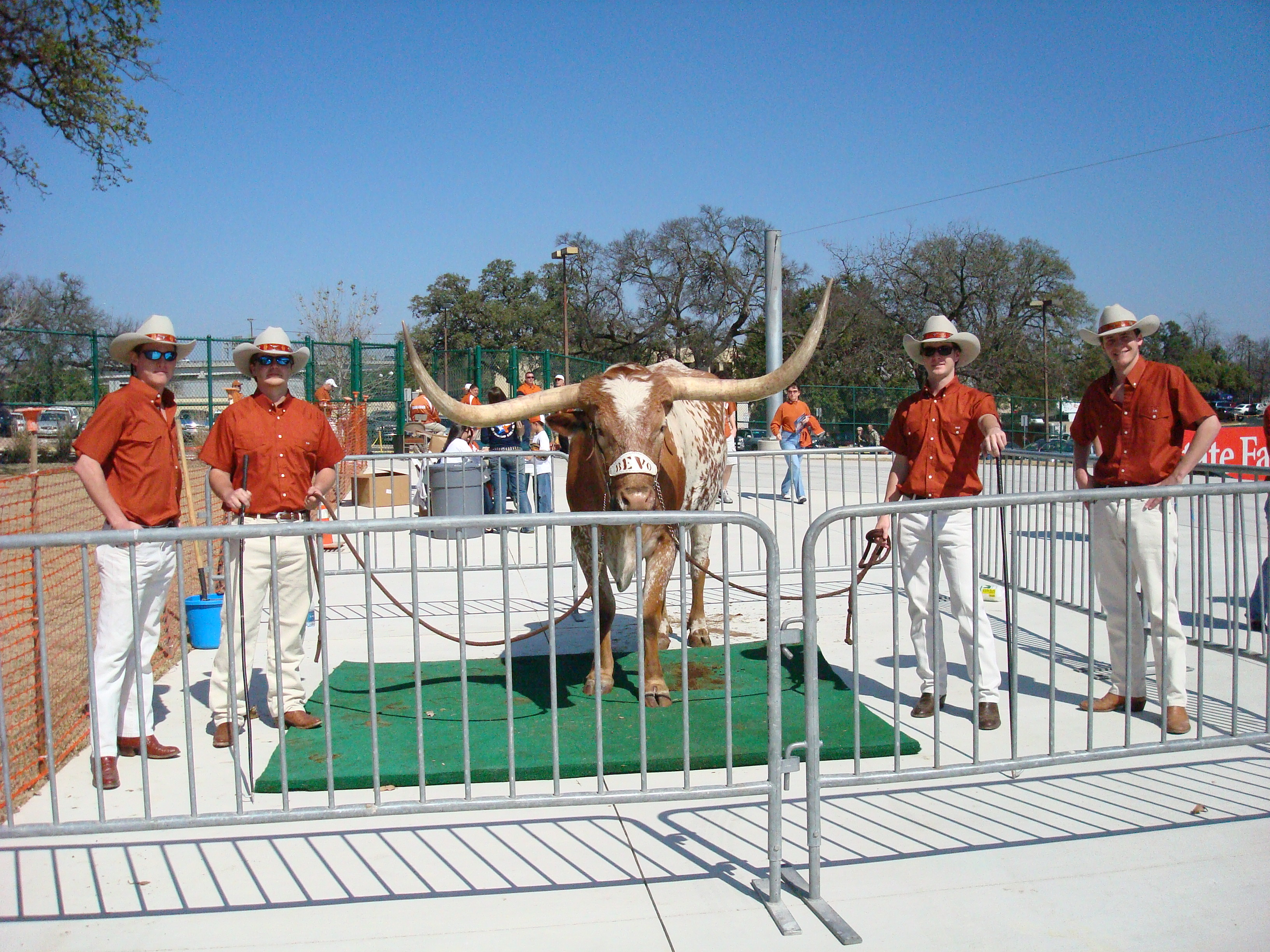
Bevo XIV with his four Texas Silver Spurs Handlers at a baseball game

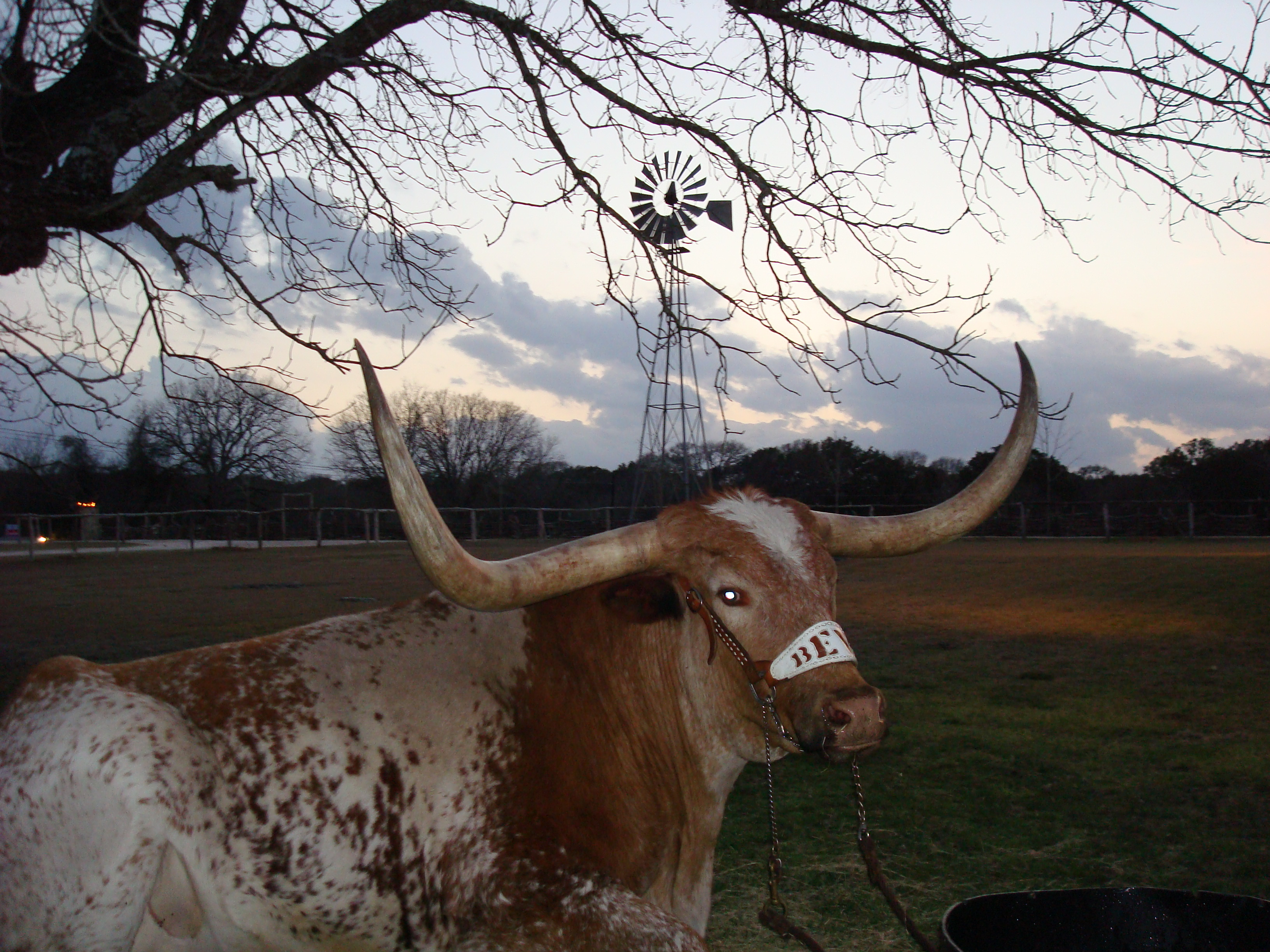
Bevo on the ranch at sunset

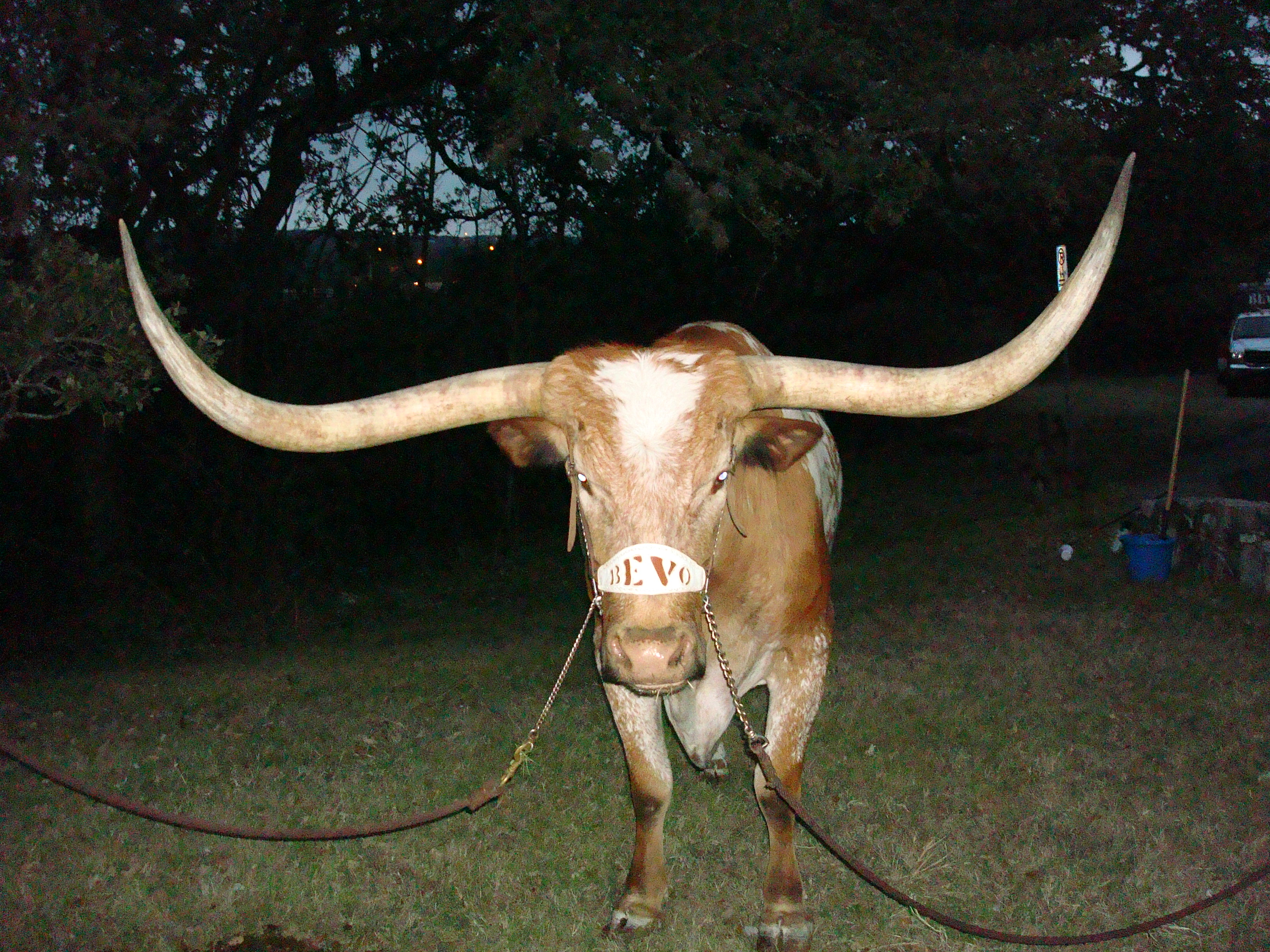
Bevo XIV

== See also ==
- List of individual bovines
