= Iberian cattle =

Iberian cattle may refer to either or both of:

- the cattle breeds of Portugal, see List of Portuguese cattle breeds
- the cattle breeds of Spain, see List of Spanish cattle breeds
