= Flag of Fort Worth =

City of Fort Worth

The current flag of Fort Worth, Texas, was adopted on July 6, 2004. The flag features a Texas Longhorn.

== History ==
1968–2004

1912–1968

The current flag replaced an earlier flag that had been in use since September 4, 1968, designed by advertising artist Richard Pruitt. The earlier flag featured a blue stripe to represent the space age, a white stripe for the Trinity River and a green stripe representing the prairie. The flag also featured the longhorn.

Prior to this flags adoption, an unofficial flag by J.J. Langever was used to represent the city, bearing the words "The Panther City".
