= Ramo Grande =

Breed of cattle

The Ramo Grande is a breed of cattle from the island of Terceira in the Portuguese archipelago of the Azores. It received its name from the northern part of the island, a plain called Ramo Grande, in the municipality of Praia da Vitória, where they continue to breed the best examples of this large format cattle species.

== Description ==
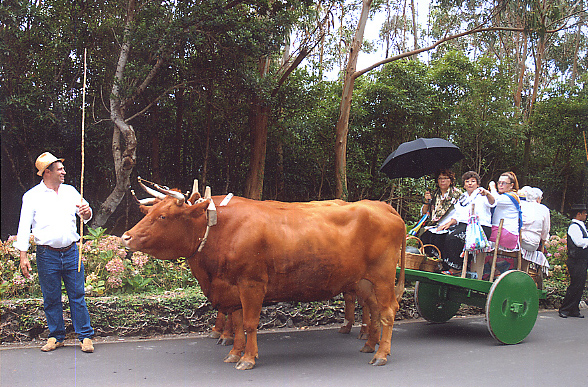
A couple of Ramo Grande cattle pulling a cart (in one of its traditional roles) during an ethnographic procession on the island of Terceira

The species has its origin in the early cattle brought by the first settlers to the island, in the 15th century, from Portugal and Flanders. The early varieties introduced onto the islands included Alentejan, Mirandese, Minhotan and Algarvian, which quickly adapted to the conditions over the following centuries. The breed was historically used in agricultural work and transport, in addition to as a source of meat and milk.

Before the early 1970s it was dominant cattle breed on the island of Terceira and surrounding islands, until it was superseded by dairy or beef cattle breeds. With the dissemination of mechanized agricultural production, the cattle lost much of its traditional functions as a beast-of-burden, but were raised as examples of the breed for ethnographic purposes (such as ethnographic processions, where the animals pulled traditional carts). The introduction of foreign dairy breeds produced higher volumes and quality of milk, resulting in less demand for the hearty breed, which could not compete with the more productive species (such as the Holstein-Friese).

By the late 20th century, farmers were more interested in protecting or preserving the breed, with the establishment of a 1996 technical specification for the pure breed. With the establishment of a registered endemic breed, there was a resurging interest in the preservation of the Azorean breed, especially in locations within the archipelago where common dairy/meat cattle could not survive. By 1996 there were 227 registered examples, and by 2004 there were 546 registered animals in the Livro de Adultos do Registo Zootécnico.

== Characteristics ==
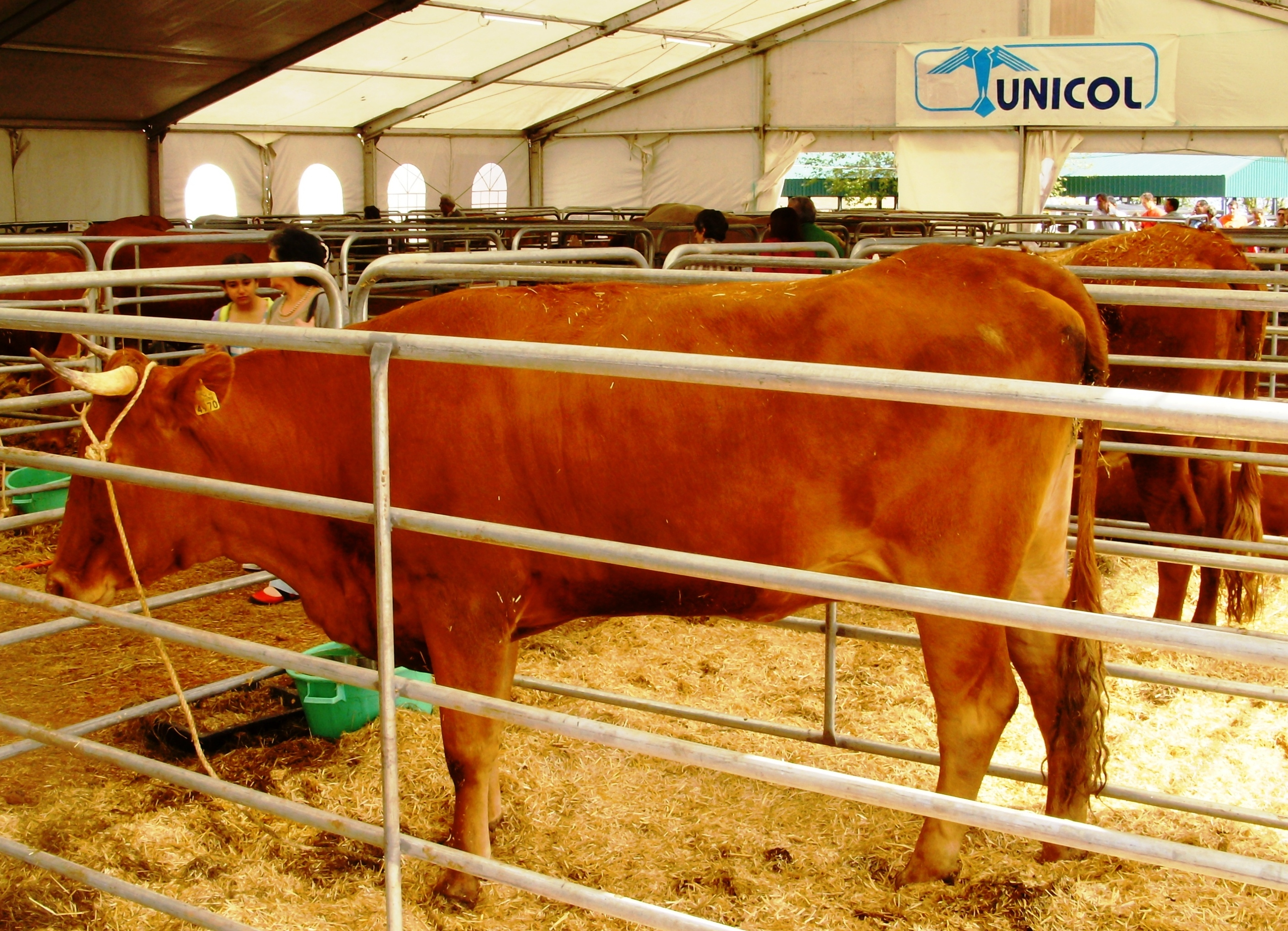
Example of the Ramo Grande during the 2010 Feira Agrícola, Angra do Heroísmo

The Ramo Grande breed is characterized by a large well-formed head, little forelock and slightly prominent frontal protuberance, with a convex profile. The curved horns extend back, sideways before curving forward towards their points, that end vertically. Its main body is marked by a large trunk and less developed rear, connected by a slightly arched quarter. Its long joints and hind quarters end a resistant hoves. Its coat is a reddish-brown matte that is more or less intense in specific areas.

== Extension ==
The breed's natural habitat is the northeast corner of the island of Terceira along a fertile plain, designated Ramo Grande. Yet, this cattle breed is popular in most of the archipelago of the Azores.

== See also ==
- Garvonesa
- Caracu
- Galician/Minhotan
- Mirandesa
