= Mertolenga =

Portuguese breed of cattle

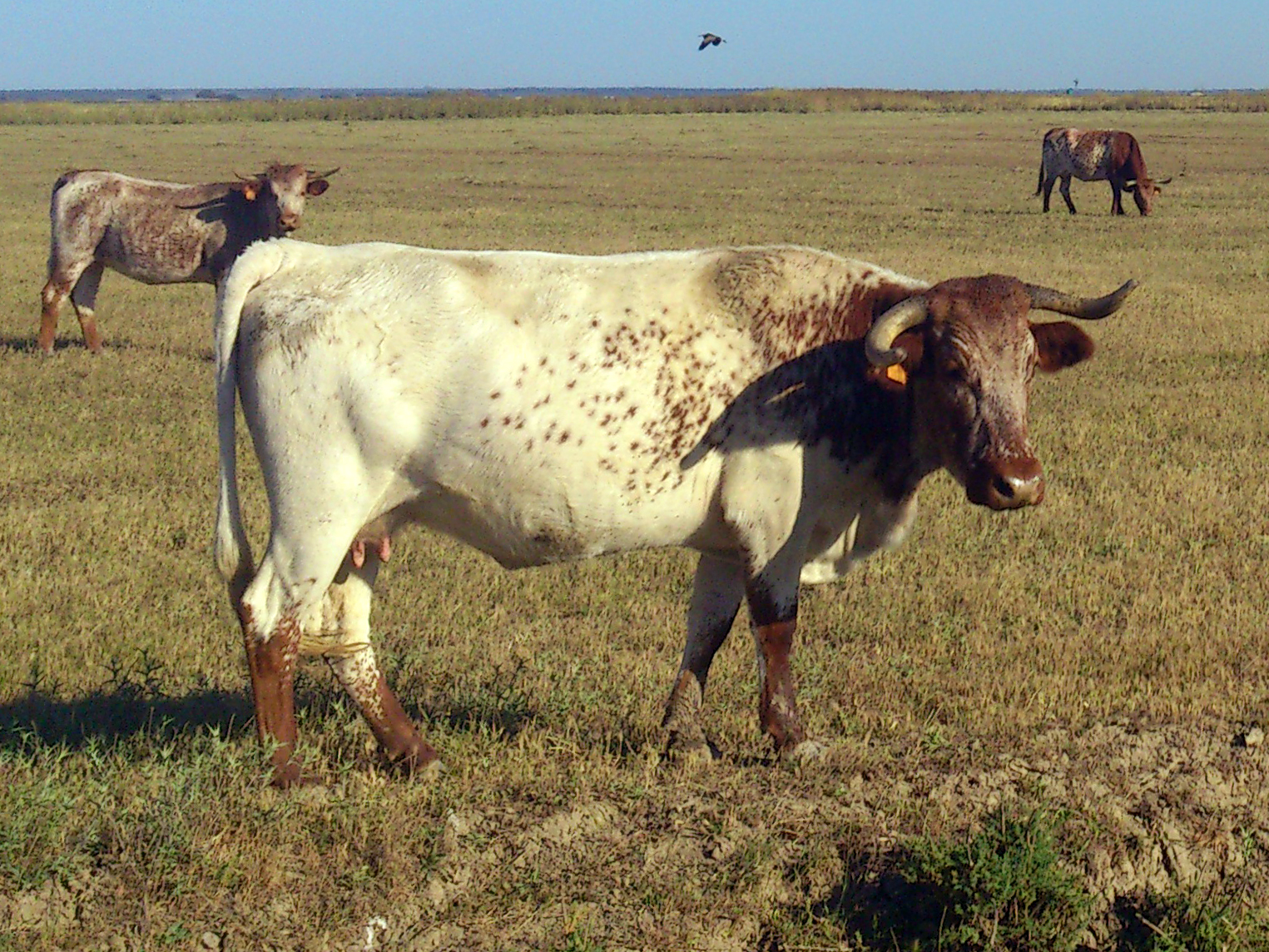
- Conservation status: FAO (2007): not at risk; DAD-IS (2022): not at risk
- Country of origin: Portugal
- Distribution: Alentejo
- Use: formerly draught, management of fighting bulls; now beef

The Mertolenga is a Portuguese breed of cattle. It is named for the concelho of Mértola in south-eastern Alentejo, bordering with Spain. In 2003 it was one of thirteen registered Portuguese cattle breeds, constituting approximately 19 per cent of cattle in the country.

== History ==
The Mertolenga originated as a colour variant within the Alentejana cattle of Alentejo in south-eastern Portugal, identified in 1873. It derives in part from the Spanish Berrenda en Colorado.

The breed region is circumscribed almost exclusively to southern Portugal in the Low Alentejo, and Ribatejo regions.

== Use ==
The Mertolenga was originally used principally for draught work in the rice fields of Alentejo. It was also used to assist in moving and handling fighting cattle, in the same way that the Berrenda en Colorado is used in Spain. In the twenty-first century it is reared for beef, some of which is marketed as Carne Mertolenga, which has Denominação de Origem Protegida status.
