= Will C. Barnes =

US Army soldier and Medal of Honor recipient (1858–1936)

Will Croft Barnes
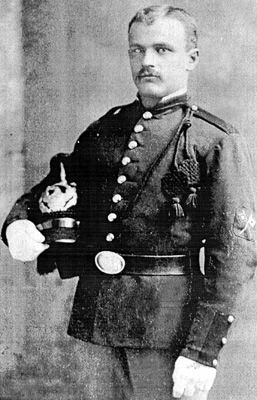
- Born: June 21, 1858; San Francisco, California, U.S.
- Died: December 17, 1936 (aged 78); Phoenix, Arizona, U.S.
- Burial place: Arlington National Cemetery
- Military career
- Allegiance: United States of America
- Branch: United States Army
- Service years: 1879–1883
- Rank: Sergeant
- Unit: Signal Corps
- Conflicts: Indian Wars
- Awards: Medal of Honor
- Other work: author, legislator

Will Croft Barnes (June 21, 1858 – December 17, 1936), a private in the U.S. Army Signal Corps, was distinguished for his action in the battle at Fort Apache, Arizona Territory on September 11, 1881. When Fort Apache was besieged by warriors of Geronimo, Barnes escaped and rode to Fort Thomas. Soldiers from Fort Thomas came to the aid of Fort Apache. For his gallantry, Barnes received the Medal of Honor on November 8, 1882, the citation noting his "bravery in action."

== Biography ==
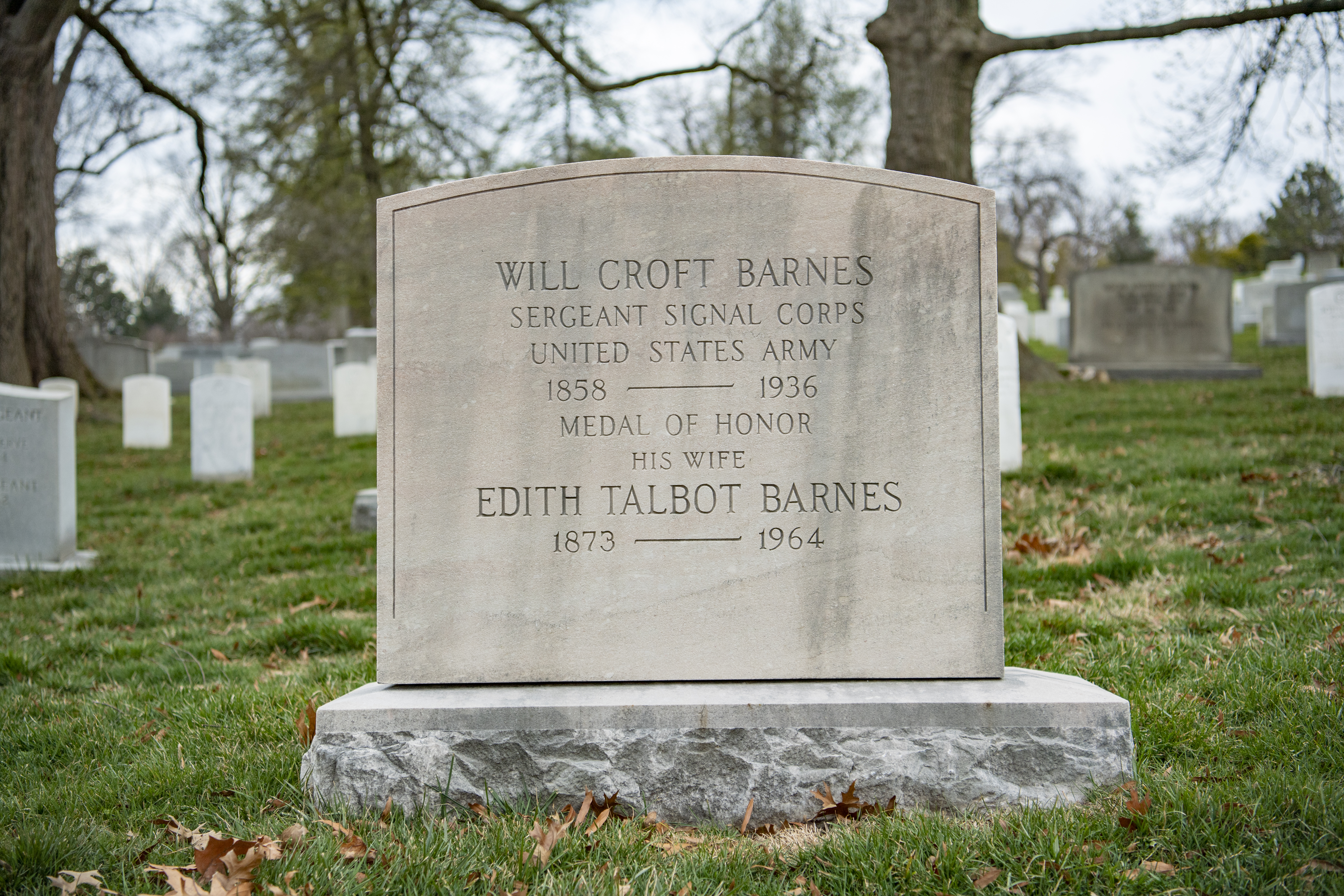
Grave at Arlington National Cemetery

He was born on June 21, 1858, and was the author of Arizona Place Names and associate editor of Arizona Historical Review, both published by the University of Arizona Press. He joined the Army from Washington, D.C. in July 1879, and was discharged with the rank of Sergeant in July 1883.

After leaving military service, Barnes worked as a rancher in Arizona, and served in the legislatures of Arizona Territory. He also wrote several books.

Beginning in 1907 he served for twenty-one years in the United States Forest Service. In this capacity he and a companion traveled across southern Texas to round up the last of the Longhorn cattle, thus saving the breed from extinction. The Longhorns were shipped to the Wichita Mountains Wildlife Refuge in Oklahoma.

He was born in San Francisco, California, and entered the service at Washington, D.C. He died in Phoenix, Arizona, and is buried with his wife Elizabeth Talbot (1873–1964) at Arlington National Cemetery, in Arlington, Virginia.

== Namesake ==
The U.S. Army Reserve Center in Phoenix, Arizona and the Fort Huachuca Field House are named in his honor.

Two memorial plaques were dedicated to him in Papago Park designating Barnes Butte.

== See also ==
- List of Medal of Honor recipients
