= Tourada à corda =

Type of bullfighting traditional to the Azores Islands

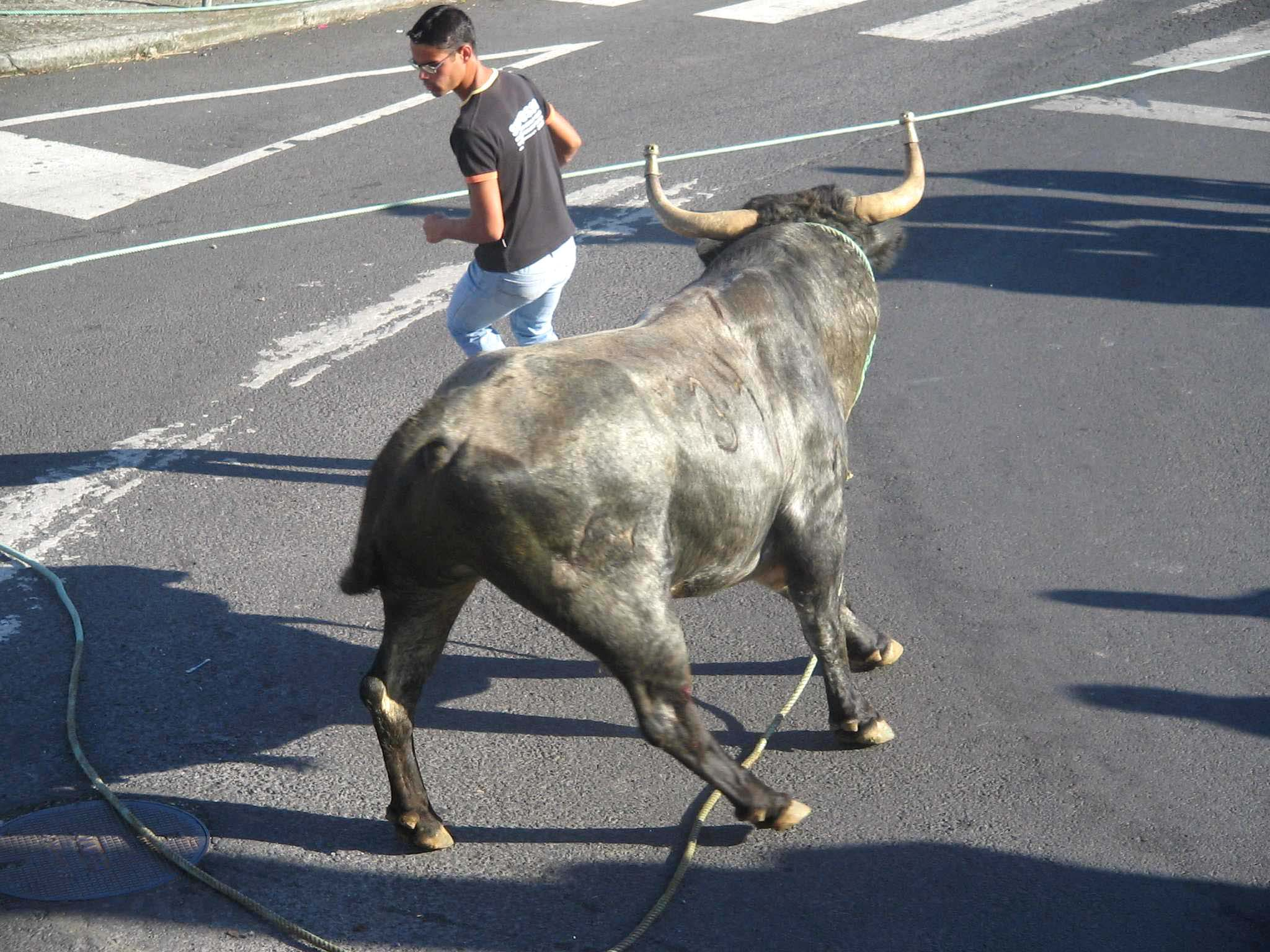
Tourada à corda on the island of Terceira, Azores Islands, Portugal

Tourada à corda (Portuguese pronunciation: [toˈɾaðaaˈkɔɾðɐ]; "bullfight by rope"), toirada à corda or corrida de touros à corda, is a type of bullfighting traditional to the Azores Islands, and particularly the island of Terceira, where it is believed to be one of the most ancient recreational traditions in the archipelago.

This type of bullfighting is peculiar to the Azores, and is composed of events with four adult bulls of the Brava dos Açores breed along a designated road or street around 500 metres in length. The bull is controlled by a rope around its neck, held by eight people (pastores) that direct the bull and prevent its leaving the field of play. The bull is led along the course of the road, and taunted and teased by players, but with no intent to kill the animal; the animal's horns are capped with balls or leather to diminish the risk to the players. All the bulls are released after each event in order to rest before the next event (at least three weeks).

Portuguese immigrants from the Azores also practice the tradition of touradas à corda in Ontario, Canada and California, United States.

== History ==
The first known tourada à corda was in 1622, organised by the Câmara de Angra during the celebrations in honour of the canonisation of saints Francis Xavier and Ignatius of Loyola. It is presumed by the inclusion of the touradas in the festivities that they were already a popular event.

== Sources ==
- Diário Insular, 5 February 2009.
