= Texas Longhorn Breeders Association of America =

TLBAA logo.

The Texas Longhorn Breeders Association of America (TLBAA) is a North American organization of ranchers who participate in the breeding and husbandry of Texas Longhorn cattle. Based in Fort Worth, Texas, the organization was founded in 1964 to serve as a registry for the longhorn breed. The Association was started by rancher Charles Schreiner III, grandson of the legendary cattle baron Captain Charles Armand Schreiner who sent approximately 150,00 head of longhorn to market after the Civil War. The Texas Longhorn became the foundation of the American cattle industry by claiming first rights in the untamed, newly discovered Americas more than 500 years ago. In 1690, the first herd of cattle was driven north from Mexico to land that would eventually become Texas. By the Civil War, millions of Longhorns ranged between the mesquite-dotted sandy banks of the Rio Bravo to the sand beds of the Sabine. Most of the Longhorns were unbranded, survivors of Indian raids, scattered by stampedes and weather, escaped from missions or abandoned after ranch failures.

Less than 40 years later, the Longhorn was closer to extinction than the buffalo. In 1927, the Federal government stepped in to help preserve the Texas Longhorn and a great part of our American heritage. Congress assigned forest service rangers, Will C. Barnes and John H. Hatton, to the task and these two men put the first herd together for Wichita Mountains Wildlife Refuge in Oklahoma. Charles Schreiner III, a.k.a. Charlie Three or Three, whose family had a long history with the Texas Longhorn, established the Texas Longhorn Breeders Association of America in 1964. It was another Longhorn enthusiast, Harry Pon of Oregon, who gave him the idea, but Schreiner believed that an organization created to honor the Texas Longhorn belonged in Texas. He filed for incorporation and the TLBAA held their first meeting in September 1964 with 30 members in attendance. It was at that initial meeting that officers were elected, by-laws were written, and Charles Schreiner III was elected as the organizations first President. As the Association grew, regional associations representing geographical sections of the U.S. were formed. In 1979, the TLBAA would be the first livestock organization to elect a woman, Norma Schreiner, to the South Texas Longhorn Board of Directors.

The association has grown into a promotional organization for the longhorn breed, to "protect the unique heritage of the Texas Longhorn, to preserve the purity of the breed, and to promote Texas Longhorns as a distinct breed while encouraging its future through promotion, education and research." As part of its efforts, the organization sponsors competitions among Texas Longhorn breeders in the United States and Canada, including a World Show each June in Fort Worth. Since its founding in 1964, its membership has grown from 12 members to over 5,000 throughout the United States. The organization also publishes a monthly magazine for breeders, "Texas Longhorn Trails Magazine."
