= Texas Silver Spurs =

Men's philanthropic service organization at UT Austin

The Texas Silver Spurs (often referred to as the Spurs) is an honorary men's service organization at the University of Texas at Austin, best known as the caretakers of Bevo. Founded in 1937, the Spurs were established with the mission to benefit the university through service and philanthropic efforts. The Spurs serve as ambassadors of the University of Texas.

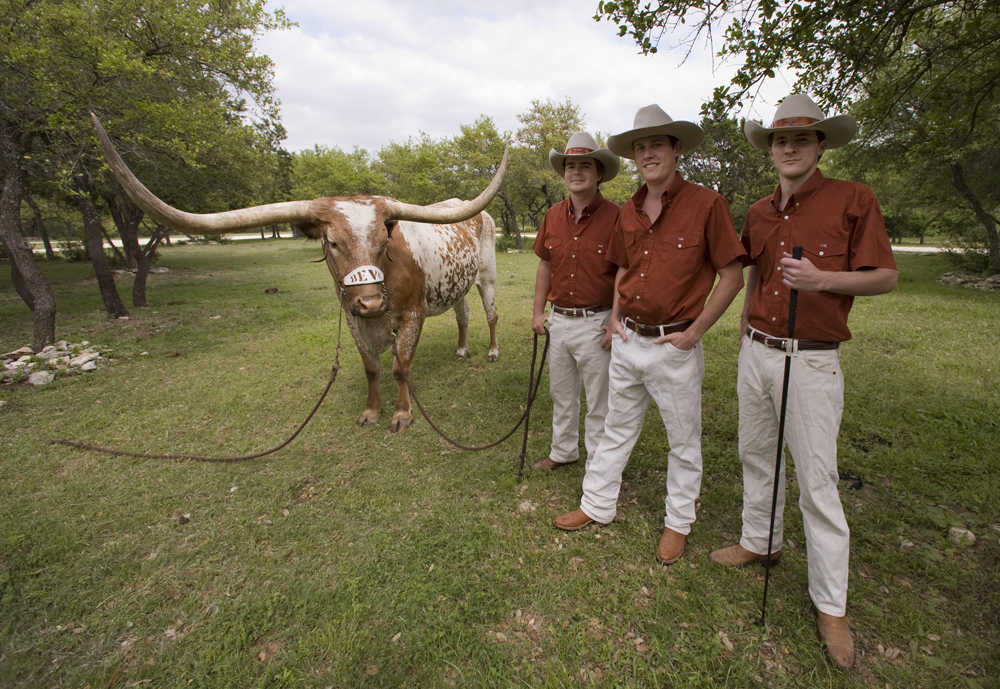
Bevo XIV with his handlers

== History ==
In 1937, the Spurs were founded at a time when few service or spirit organizations existed at the University of Texas campus. Their charter members sought out student leaders interested in service to the university and quickly gained prominent standing on campus.

In 1945, the Spurs officially overtook care-taking responsibilities for Bevo III. Given this responsibility, the Spurs became even more deeply involved in University spirit activities. They have managed the mascot ever since.

In 1950, the Spurs made the decision to raise Bevo V from calfhood after challenges handling Bevo III and IV. Previously, Bevo had escaped his handlers, charged people, and caused property damage. This new strategy allowed the handlers to better control the mascot, and he was able to travel with the football team on a consistent basis.

In 1963, the Spurs worked with the Texas Rangers to recover Bevo VII after his kidnapping by Texas A&M University students. This kidnapping came just days before the Longhorns were set to take on the Aggies in football, a game Texas eventually won 15–13. Bevo was unharmed.

In 1995, the Spurs took over responsibility of Smokey the Cannon after the cancellation of the Texas Cowboys as a student organization. Mike Perrin, a Cowboys alumnus, leased the cannon to the Spurs for five years at $1 annually with the hope to continue the tradition despite the Cowboys' removal. During this time, the Spurs fired Smokey and looked after Bevo at Longhorn football games. Upon the Cowboys' reinstatement in 2000, the Spurs returned Smokey.

In 2006, the Silver Spurs Alumni Association completed construction of the Silver Spurs Bevo Center. The museum commemorates Bevo throughout the history of the tradition and the organization's role in his handling. Located in Darrell K Royal–Texas Memorial Stadium, the center is one of the few structures on the university campus named for a student organization.

In 2019, the Spurs again took over responsibility of Smokey the Cannon after the second cancellation of the Texas Cowboys as a student organization. Members of the Cowboys Alumni Association came to an agreement with the university to allow this transition to occur for the duration of the suspension.

Over the years, the Spurs have escorted Bevo all over the country for football games, including the 2006 Rose Bowl. The Spurs have also brought Bevo to special events including George W. Bush's first and second presidential inaugural ball.

== Roles and responsibilities ==
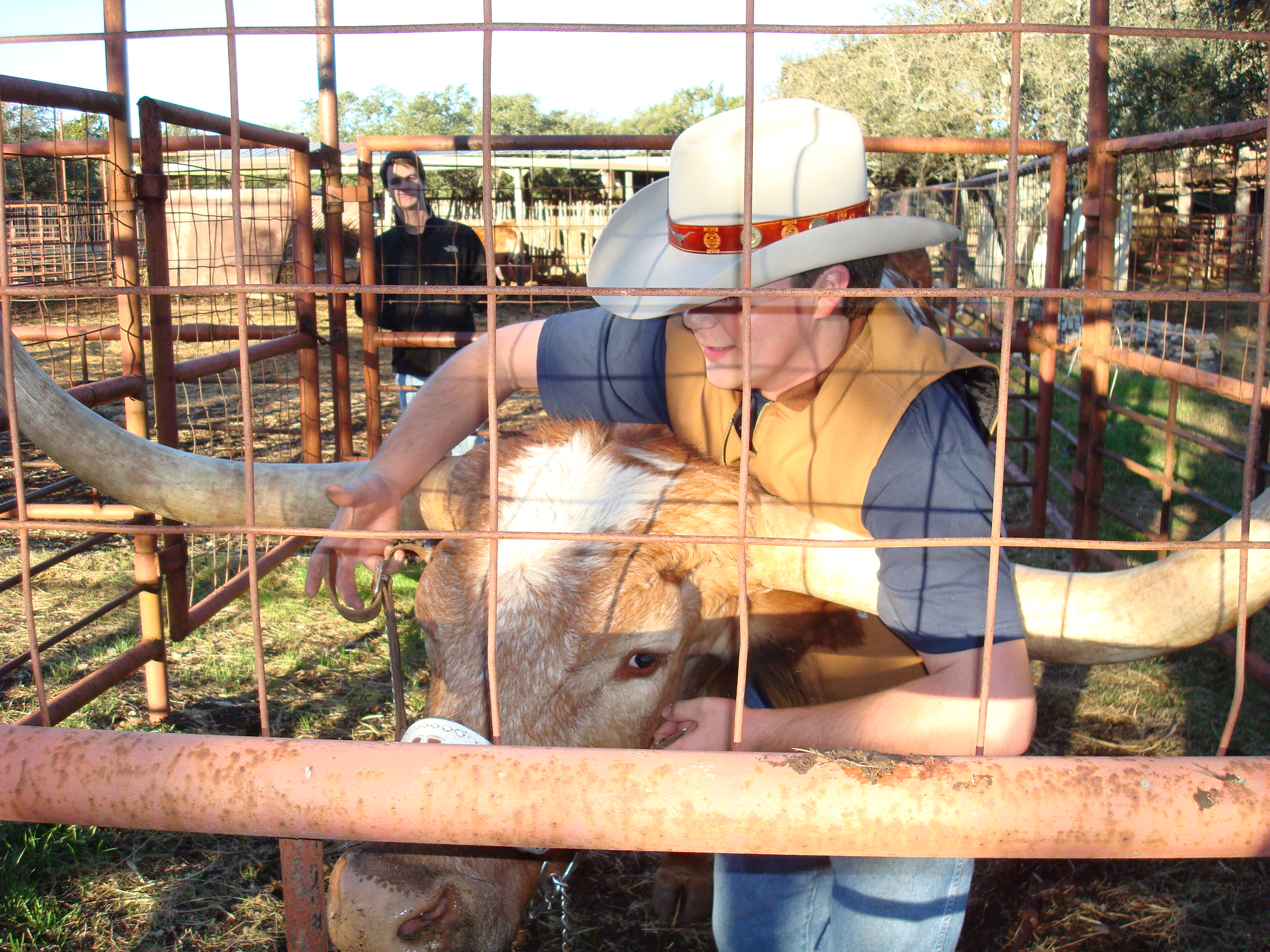
Bevo XIV being haltered by one of his handlers

The Spurs primary responsibilities stem from the management, care, and transportation of Bevo. Each year, a new group of student handlers is elected and trained to transport the school's mascot for all events. During this time, they must learn to halter Bevo and become familiar with the techniques required to direct and control him. In addition to appearances at all home football games, the Spurs are responsible for bringing Bevo to special events for the university and private parties.

Active Spurs are required to participate in service work in the Austin area. The Spurs primary philanthropic partner is the Neighborhood Longhorns Program, to which the organizations has donated over $250,000 all-time. To support these efforts, the Spurs host Spring Jam, an annual charity concert whose proceeds support the Neighborhood Longhorn Program. In addition to monetary contributions, active members are required to complete hours tutoring at local Title I Schools every semester.

In partnership with the Texas Exes, the Spurs established the Bevo Endowment. The Bevo Endowment's stated mission is to “benefit/support: The ongoing care and transportation of future BEVOs; Scholarships for exemplary students at The University of Texas; The University of Texas Neighborhood Longhorn’s Program; Other philanthropic endeavors associated with The University of Texas.”

== Notable alumni ==
- Craig Goldman - Real estate businessman, Member of the Texas House of Representatives from District 97
- Tom Hicks - Billionaire, private equity investor
- Steve Hicks - Businessman, member of the University of Texas System Board of Regents
- Gary Kusin - Entrepreneur, Founder of GameStop, Former CEO of Fedex Kinko's
- Greg Swindell - Former MLB Pitcher, World Series Champion
- Bill Zapalac - Architect, Former NFL linebacker and defensive end
- Diron Talbert - Former Pro Bowl defensive end
- Tom Harmon - Former MLB and Texas Longhorns baseball coach
