= Texas Longhorn =

American breed of cattle

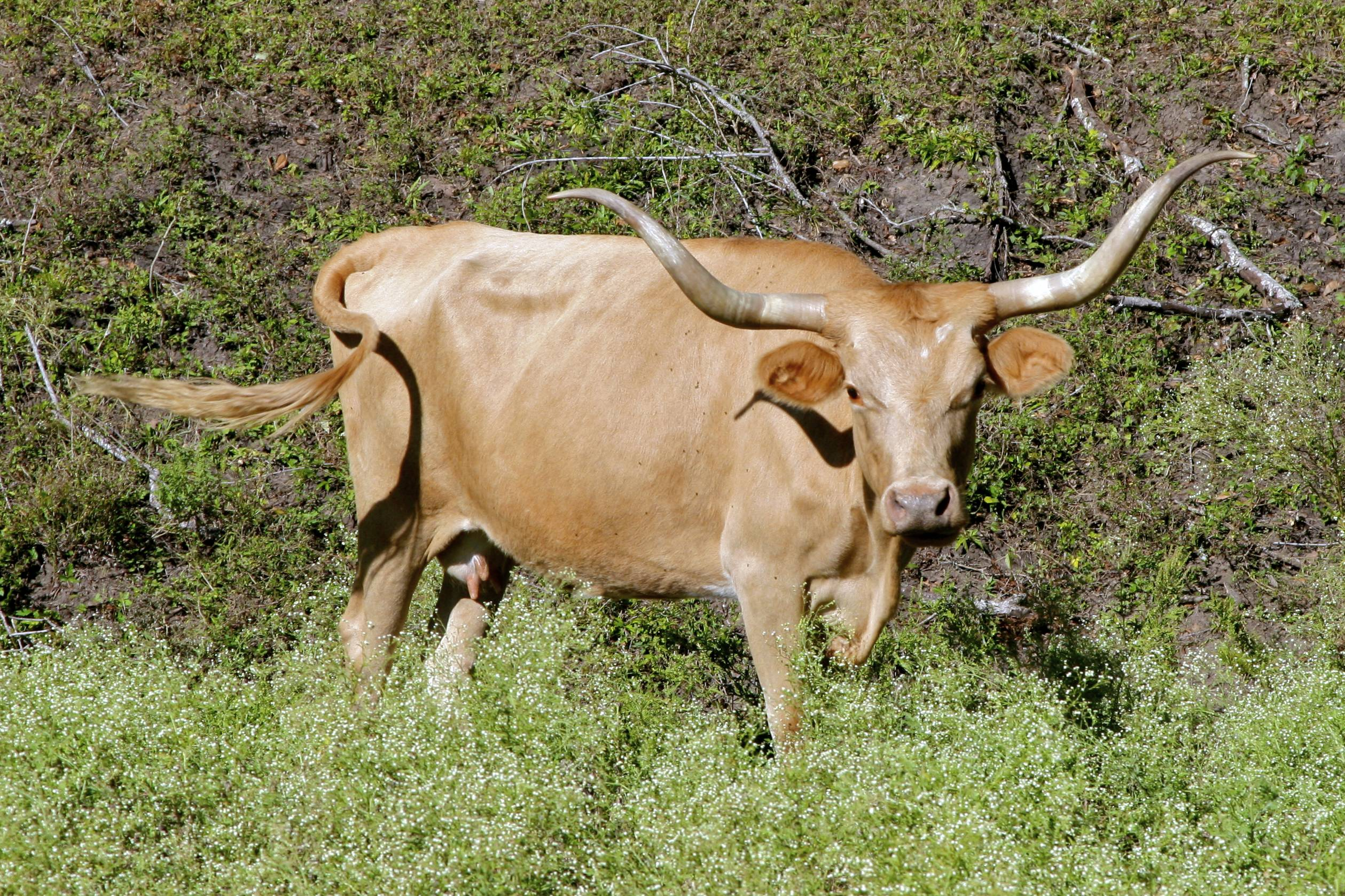
- Conservation status: FAO (2007): not at risk; Livestock Conservancy (2021): critical; DAD-IS (2022): at risk
- Country of origin: United States

Traits
- Coat: red, white, black, brown
- Horn status: horned, large thick horns
- Cattle; Bos (primigenius) taurus

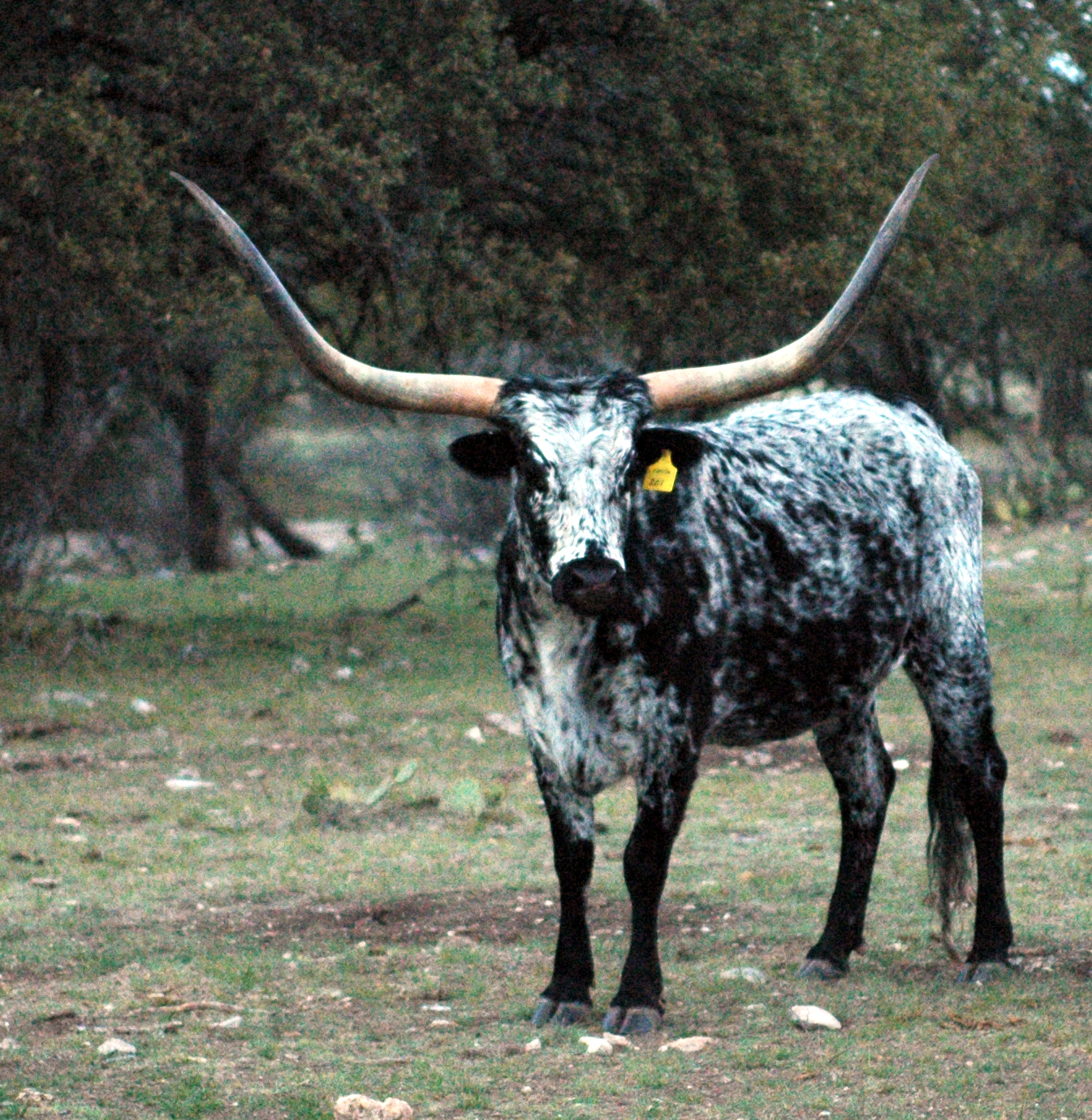
A steer

The Texas Longhorn is an American breed of beef cattle, characterized by its long horns, which can span more than 8 ft (2.4 m) from tip to tip. It derives from cattle brought from the Iberian Peninsula to the Americas by Spanish conquistadors from the time of the Second Voyage of Christopher Columbus until about 1512. For hundreds of years the cattle lived a semi-feral existence on the rangelands; they have a higher tolerance of heat and drought than most European breeds. The coat can be of any color or mix of colors; in some 40% of the cattle it is some shade of red, often a light red.

In the twenty-first century, the Longhorn is considered a part of the cultural heritage of Texas.

== History ==
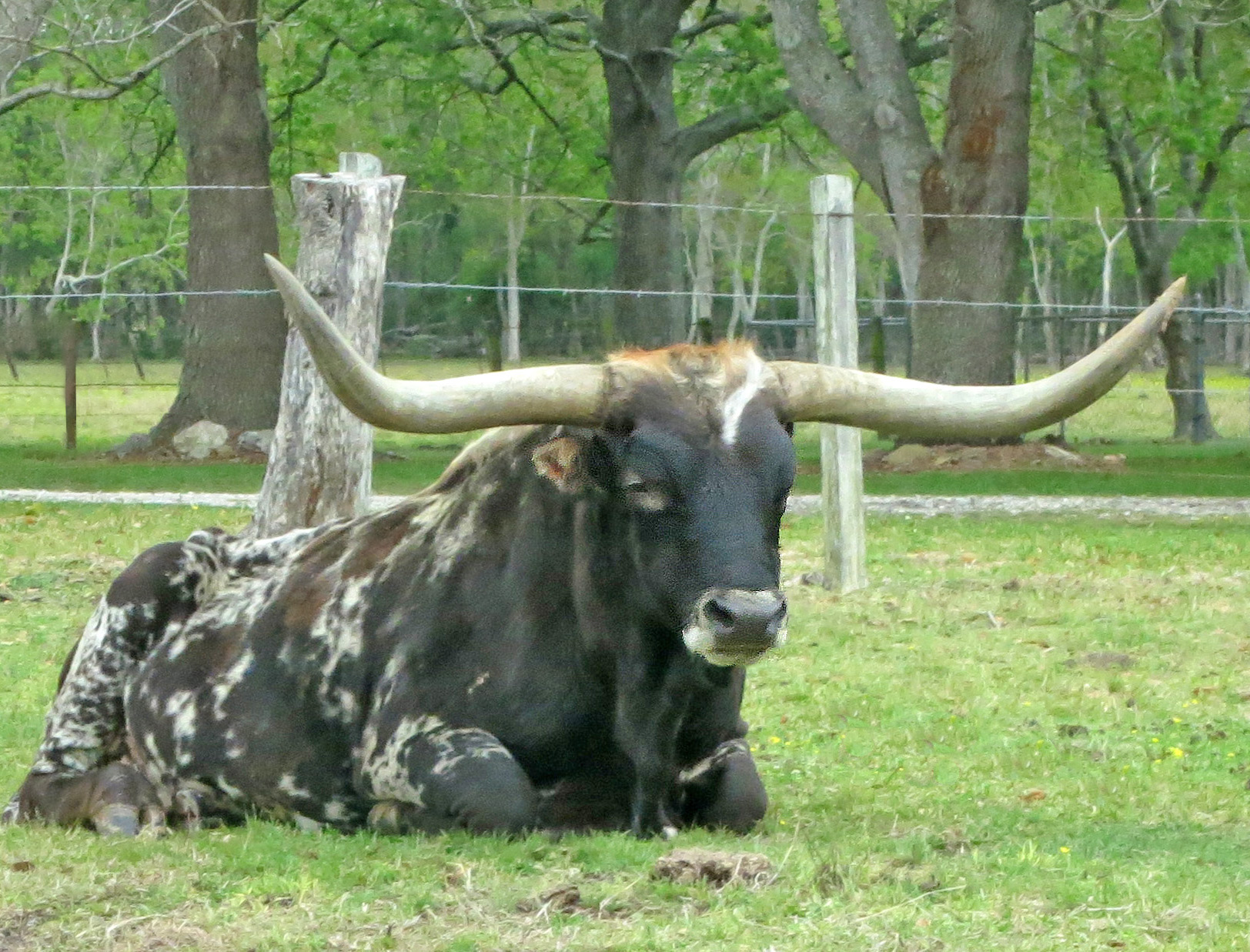
A Texas Longhorn in Alvin, Texas

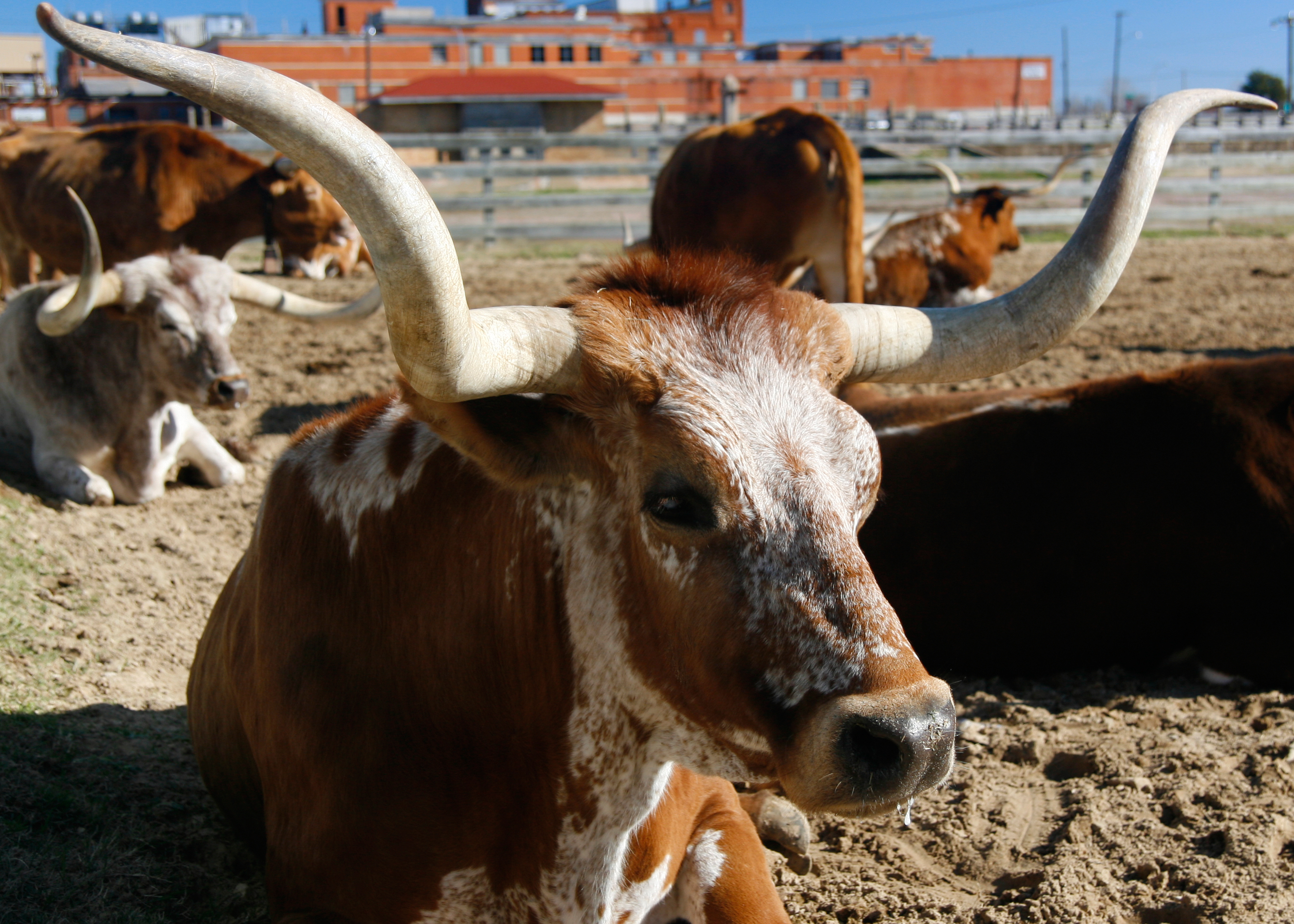
A Texas Longhorn in Fort Worth, Texas

The Texas Longhorn derives from cattle brought to the Americas by Spanish conquistadors from the time of the Second Voyage of Christopher Columbus until about 1512. The first cattle were landed in 1493 on the Caribbean island of La Isla Española (now known as Hispaniola) to provide food for the colonists.

Over the next two centuries, the Spaniards used the cattle in Mexico and gradually moved them north to accompany their expanding settlements. The Spaniards reached the area that became known as "Texas" near the end of the 17th century. Eventually, some cattle escaped or were turned loose on the open range, where they remained mostly feral for the next two centuries. Over several generations, descendants of these cattle developed to have high feed- and drought-stress tolerances and other "hardy" characteristics that have given Longhorns their reputation as livestock.

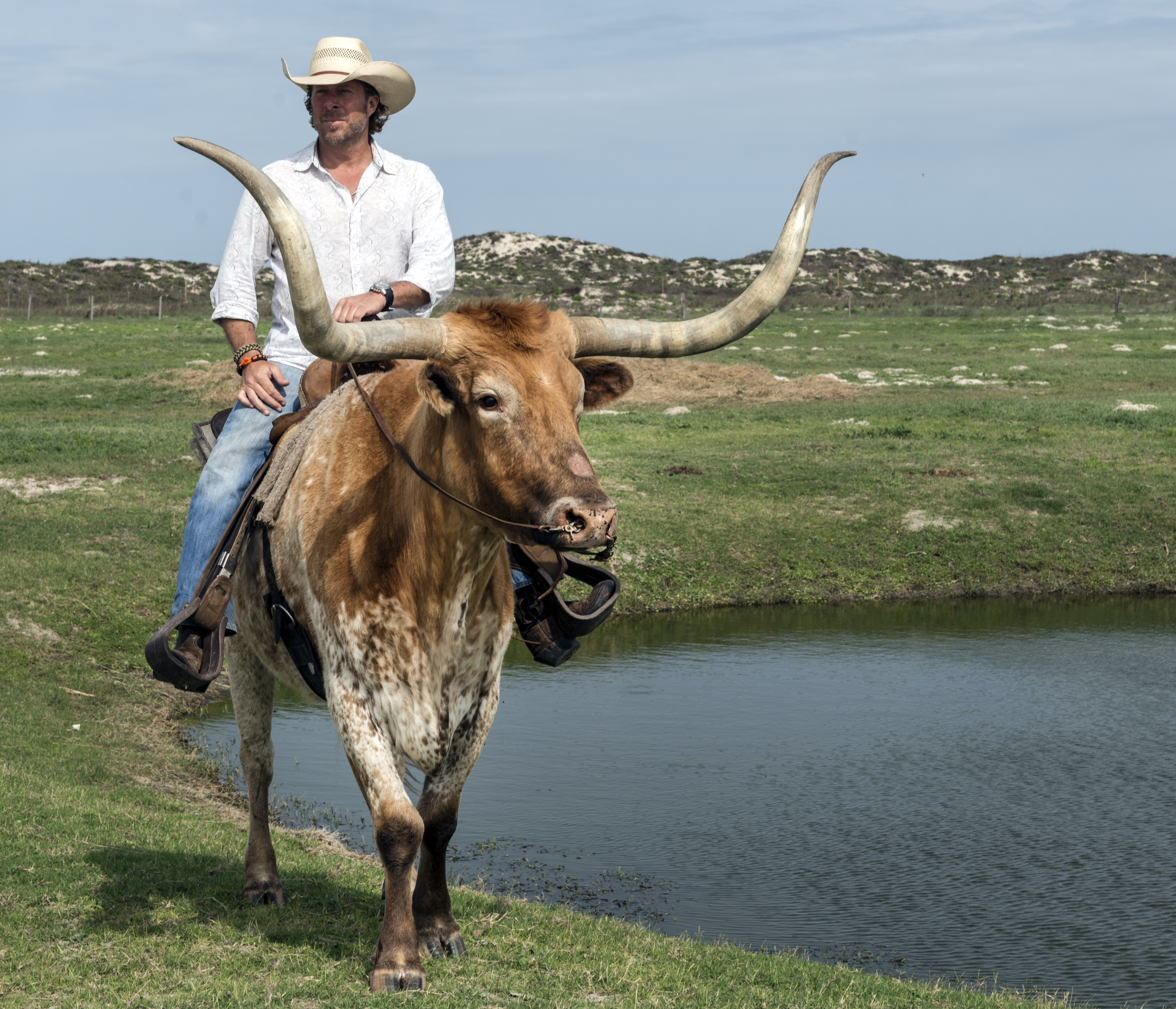
Steer riding on Padre Island, Texas

The Texas Longhorn stock slowly dwindled, but in 1927, the breed was saved from near extinction by enthusiasts from the United States Forest Service. They collected a small herd of stock to breed on the Wichita Mountains Wildlife Refuge in Lawton, Oklahoma. The breed also received significant attention after a Texas Longhorn named "Bevo" was adopted as the mascot of The University of Texas at Austin in 1917. The animal's image became commonly associated with the school's sports teams, known as the Texas Longhorns. A few years later, J. Frank Dobie and others gathered small herds to keep in Texas state parks. Oilman Sid W. Richardson helped finance the project. The Longhorns were cared for largely as curiosities, but the stock's longevity, resistance to disease, and ability to thrive on marginal pastures resulted in a revival of the breed as beef stock and for their link to Texas history.

In 1957, Charles Schreiner III began creating a Longhorn herd on his ranch, the Y O, in Mountain Home, Texas, as a tribute to the ranching legacy of his grandfather, Captain Charles Armand Schreiner, and the Longhorns he ran on his ranches. Schreiner purchased five heifers and one bull calf for $75 each from the Wichita Mountains Wildlife Refuge near Lawton. In 1964, Schreiner founded the Texas Longhorn Breeders Association of America. The YO herd were the first cattle registered with the association. To draw attention to the Longhorn and its new association, in 1966, Schreiner organized a cattle drive of Longhorn steers from San Antonio, Texas to Dodge City, Kansas. The drive was promoted as a centennial commemoration of the earlier Chisholm Trail drives. Schreiner arranged for local members of the Quanah sheriff's posse to stage a simulated “Indian attack” as the steers crossed the Red River at Doan's Crossing. The attack was so authentic that the steers stampeded with cowboys in close pursuit. Four hours were needed to reassemble the herd. In 1976, Texas Tech University in Lubbock persuaded Schreiner to stage a cattle trail drive to celebrate its new National Ranching Heritage Center.

In 1995, the Texas Legislature designated the Texas Longhorn as the state large mammal. In the 21st century, Texas Longhorns from elite bloodlines can sell for $40,000 or more at auction. The record of $380,000 on March 18, 2017, was for a cow, 3S Danica, and heifer calf at side, during the Legacy XIII sale in Fort Worth, Texas.

Registries for the breed include: the Texas Longhorn Breeders Association of America, founded in 1964 by the Kerr County rancher Charles Schreiner III; the International Texas Longhorn Association; and the Cattlemen's Texas Longhorn Registry. The online National Texas Longhorn Museum displays the diversity of horns found in the breed, stories about notable individual cattle of the breed, and a gallery of furniture made from cattle horns.

== Characteristics ==
The Longhorn is genetically close to Iberian cattle breeds such as the De Lidia and Retinta of Spain and the Alentejana and Mertolenga of Portugal. Like other Criollo cattle of the Americas and many breeds of southern Europe, it is principally of taurine (European) derivation, but has a small admixture of indicine genetic heritage; this may be a consequence of gene flow across the Strait of Gibraltar from cattle of African origin dating to before the time of the Spanish Conquest.

The horns are in some cases very long. In general, the horns of bulls are of moderate length, while those of steers may be much longer. In 2022 the Guinness Book of Records reported the longest spread of cattle horns (on a living animal) to be: 323.7 cm (127.4 in) for a steer called Poncho Via; 265.1 cm (104.4 in) for a cow named 3S Danica; and 262.5 cm (103.3 in) for a bull named Cowboy Tuff Chex. All three were Texas Longhorns.

Coat color is extremely variable. In some 40% of the cattle it is some shade of red, often a light red; the only shade of red not seen is the deep colour typical of the Hereford. The finching pattern is common; when the base color is black it is called zorillo, from the Spanish word for 'skunk'. Other colors include variations of black, blue, brown, cream, dun, grey, yellow or white, either with or without brindling (called gateada, from the Spanish word for 'cat'), speckling or spotting. Speckled and solid-coloured animals are in roughly equal proportion.

== Use ==
The Longhorn was traditionally reared for beef. In the 21st century it is considered part of the cultural heritage of Texas; it is the official large mammal of the state.

It may be kept for conservation reasons, or bred for greater horn length. It is occasionally used for steer riding.
