= Hook 'Em =

Costumed mascot of the University of Texas at Austin

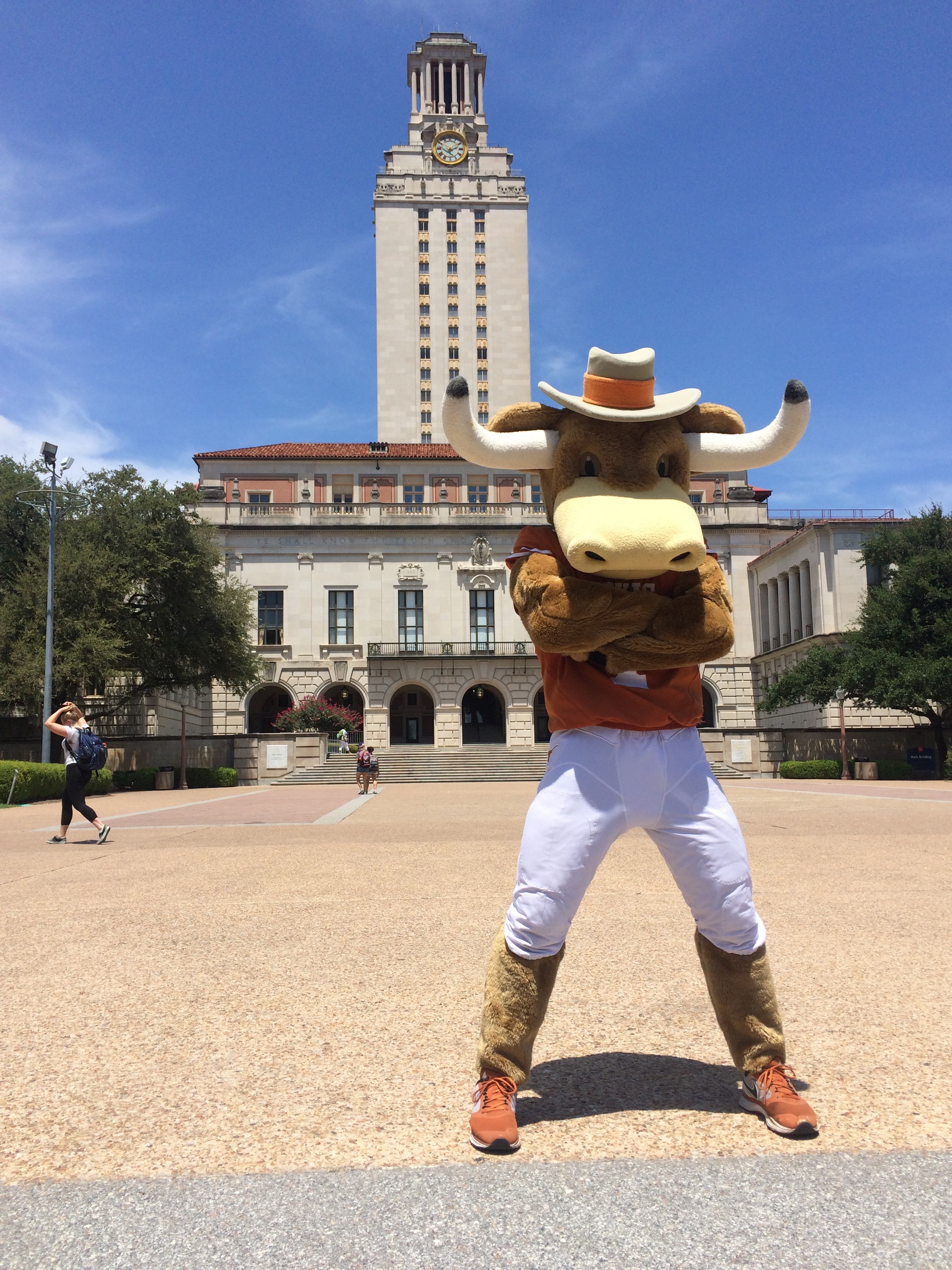
- Hook 'Em in front of the Tower
- University: The University of Texas at Austin
- Conference: SEC
- Description: Anthropomorphic longhorn
- Origin of name: Hook 'em Horns hand gesture
- First seen: The mascot costume was approved by the University Spirit Committee in September 1975 to only be used at Texas basketball games.
- Related mascot(s): Bevo

Hook 'Em, the official costumed mascot of the University of Texas at Austin athletic teams, is a prominent figure at various sports events. Hook 'Em is regularly seen on the sidelines of Darrell K Royal–Texas Memorial Stadium during football games, and at the Moody Center for basketball games, engaging fans and contributing to a lively atmosphere. Beyond these sporting events, Hook 'Em's presence can be requested through the Texas Athletics website, allowing the mascot to engage with the broader university community and its supporters.

== History ==
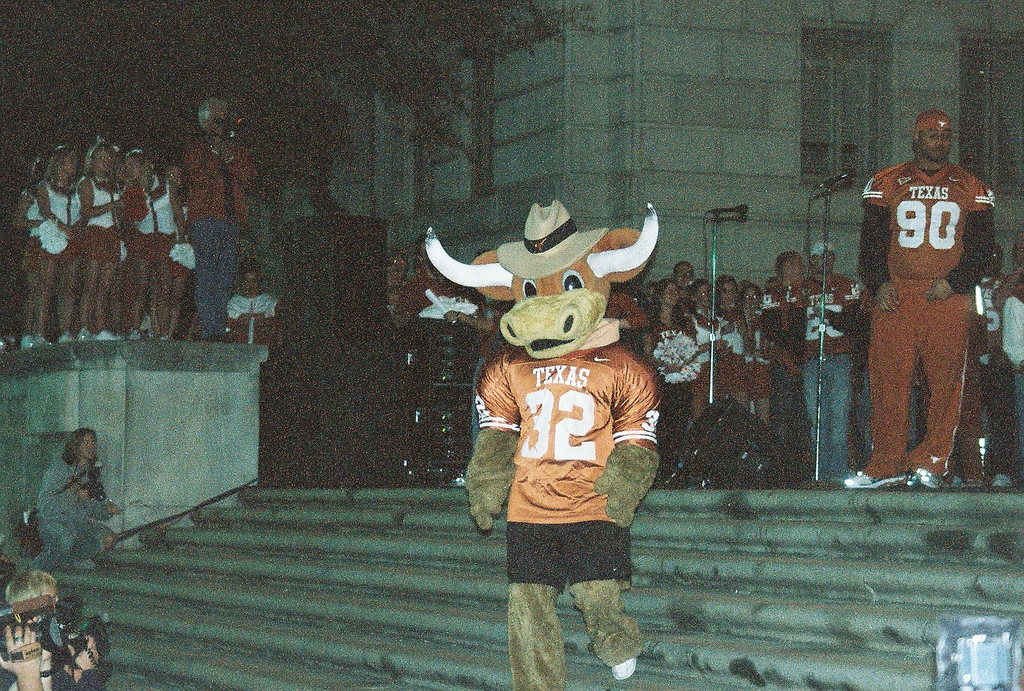
The mascot before the 2014 costume redesign

In January 1975, Steven “Sox” Sockler (BBA ‘76, MBA ‘78) attended a basketball game against the University of Houston at Gregory Gym. The Cougars brought their costume mascot. Sockler questioned why the Longhorns did not have their own costumed mascot, and his friends at the game challenged him to create one. In April 1975, Sockler proposed the idea to the University Spirit Committee chaired by Wally Pryor. The committee told Sockler to return the next fall semester with a completed costume and it would be considered.

In June 1975, Sockler enlisted the services of Hugh Head, an Art Professor at Lamar University, to create the headpiece. The foundation was made using a construction helmet, with welding rods in the crown of the helmet to create horns. The entire frame was enveloped in paper mâché and subsequently coated with fiberglass. The rest of the costume was handcrafted by Margaret Sockler, Steven's mother.

Upon his return in the autumn, Sockler submitted the costume to the Spirit Committee for their evaluation.

Wally Pryor expressed his approval with great enthusiasm, but specified that the mascot would solely be utilized during basketball games. Sockler recalled Pryor's statement, asserting that this adorned mascot is prohibited from making appearances at football games where Bevo holds absolute authority. The policy underwent modifications over the course of time.

The unnamed costume made its first appearance at the OU football pep rally held at Gregory Gym. The costume made its next appearance during the inaugural home basketball game in November 1975. At that moment, Sockler passed by the announcer's table and Wally Pryor inquired about the name of the costume. After Sockler declined, Pryor suggested, "Let's call it 'Hook'Em'."

Sockler consistently donned the Hook’Em mascot costume for every home basketball game during the 1975-76 season. Subsequently, Sockler contributed Hook'Em to the Spirit Committee, where it remained in use until 1980, when it was substituted for a newer design.

Hook 'Em has been part of game day events ever since. Hook 'Em attends more than 250 University of Texas at Austin events at home and across the country each season. In 2014 the Hook 'Em costume was updated to include lighter horns, more defined muscles, and custom made football, basketball, and baseball uniforms.

== Notable appearances ==
Hook 'Em attends nearly all Texas Longhorns games in all sports. In 2015 he appeared at the Texas men's basketball opener against the University of Washington in Shanghai, China. In 2016, he attended the East Lake Cup in Atlanta in support of Texas men's golf.

Hook 'Em is also a friend to San Antonio Spurs mascot, the Coyote, and appeared alongside him during the Spurs' University of Texas Spirit Night.

Hook 'Em has also appeared at many non-school affiliated events. Hook 'Em attended the Austin City Limits music festival in 2014 to perform with musician Trombone Shorty, and in 2016 to perform with electronic music group Major Lazer. Hook 'Em also attended the 2015 Country Music Awards. He was featured in Brad Paisley's music video for “Country Nation”.

== National competitions ==
=== Mascot National Championship ===
In 2016 Hook 'Em placed 4th in his first UCA Mascot National Championship, beating out his rival, Boomer, the mascot for the University of Oklahoma. Boomer placed 7th.

=== Steamboat Mascot Stampede ===
Hook 'Em has been invited to compete in Steamboat Mascot Stampede every year since 2015. The competition is sponsored by former Phillie Phanatic David Raymond. Competing mascots come from various conferences around the nation, including the Big 12 Conference, Southeastern Conference, Big Ten Conference, Pac-12 Conference, and several other smaller schools.
