= Charles Schreiner III =

American rancher

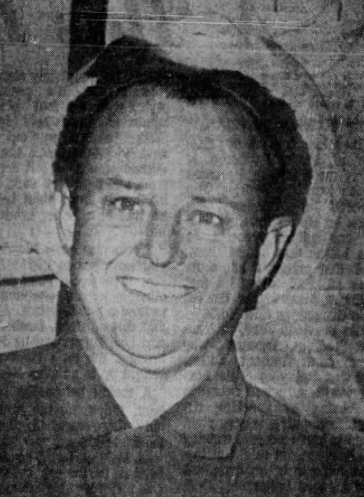
- Schreiner in 1968
- Born: January 6, 1927; San Antonio, Texas, U.S.
- Died: April 22, 2001 (aged 74); San Antonio, Texas, U.S.
- Education: University of Texas at Austin
- Occupation: Rancher
- Relatives: Charles Schreiner Sr. (grandfather)

Charles Schreiner III (January 6, 1927 – April 22, 2001) was an American rancher.

== Life and career ==
Schreiner was born in San Antonio, Texas, the son of Walter Richard Schreiner, a rancher, and Myrtle Viola Barton. He was the grandson of Charles Schreiner Sr., a Texas Ranger. He attended the University of Texas at Austin, earning his business degree. After earning his degree, he served as vice president of the Texas Sheep and Goat Raisers Association from 1959 to 1963.

In 1964, Schreiner founded the Texas Longhorn Breeders Association of America, an organization of ranchers who participate in the breeding and husbandry of Texas Longhorn cattle. In his role as founder, he expanded the organization's membership from 12 to over 100 members, and helped lead the movement in raising exotic animals on Texas ranches, establishing the Exotic Wildlife Association in 1967.

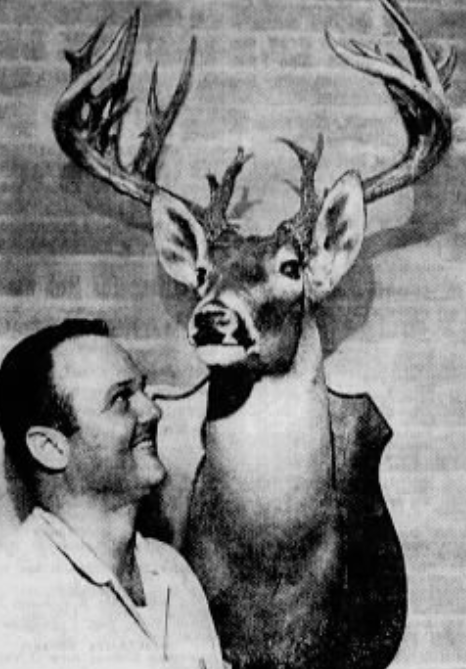
Schreiner in 1964

In 1968, Schreiner was named as Outdoorsman of the Year by the San Antonio Anglers Club.

Schreiner served on the board of directors of the Lower Colorado River Authority from 1974 to 1980.

== Death ==
Schreiner died of congestive heart failure at a hospital in San Antonio, Texas, on April 22, 2001, at the age of 74.
