= Jarmelista =

Portuguese breed of cattle

- Conservation status: FAO (2007): not listed; DAD-IS (2026): at risk/endangered-maintained
- Other names: Jarmella
- Country of origin: Portugal
- Distribution: former concelho of Jarmelo; concelho of Guarda
- Standard: Direção Geral de Alimentação e Veterinária (in Portuguese)

Traits
- Coat: pale brown or fawn-coloured
- Horn status: horned
- Cattle; Bos (primigenius) taurus

The Jarmelista is a rare Portuguese breed of cattle. It originated in – and is named for – the former concelho of Jarmelo, now within the concelho of Guarda. In the twentieth century it came close to extinction. A small number of surviving examples were identified in 2006, and in 2007 a breed society was formed and a herd-book started, in which 44 cows were registered the next year.

== History ==
The Jarmelista originated in the former concelho of Jarmelo, which in 1855 was merged into the concelho of Guarda and from which its name derives. It is documented from the second half of the nineteenth century. In 1870 the agronomist Silvestre Bernardo de Lima remarked on the good dairy qualities of the 'Jarmella' cattle of Jarmelo. He also tentatively suggested that the Jarmella might be considered to fall within the grouping of cattle of Mirandesa type of Beira, while also noting its similarities to the Raiano cattle of the area of the border of Beira with the Spanish province of Salamanca; this hypothesis was presented as definitive by some later authors. In 1904 João Tierno proposed that the Jarmelista should be considered a separate breed not closely related to any other.

By the mid-twentieth century it was considered extinct. A small number of surviving examples were identified in 2006,, and in 2007 a breed society – the Associação de Criadores de Ruminantes do Concelho da Guarda – was formed and a herd-book started, in which 44 cows were registered in the following year. In 2026 the total number of the cattle was estimated at 700–775 head, distributed in 42 herds, with 373 breeding cows and 60 active bulls; the conservation status of the breed was listed as 'at risk/endangered-maintained'.

== Characteristics ==
The Jarmelista is of medium to large size. It is usually pale brown or fawn-coloured, either with or without patches of white, and may have a pale ring round the muzzle; bulls may be darker than cows. The mucosae are usually unpigmented in cows but may be darker in bulls. The horns are long and curve forwards.

== Use ==
The cattle of Beira were formerly triple-purpose, used principally for draught work, but also as dairy animals and for meat.
