= Brava dos Açores =

Portuguese breed of cattle

- Conservation status: FAO (2007): not listed; DAD-IS (2026): at risk/endangered
- Other names: Raca Brava dos Açores
- Country of origin: Portugal
- Distribution: Faial; Flores; Graciosa; Pico; São Jorge; São Miguel; Terceira
- Standard: Direção Regional da Agricultura, Veterinária e Alimentação (in Portuguese)
- Use: tourada à corda (bull-running)

Traits
- Coat: usually black, many other colours also seen
- Horn status: long, thin, upward-pointing
- Cattle; Bos (primigenius) taurus

Tourada a corda (bull-running) in Terceira

The Brava dos Açores is a Portuguese breed of fighting cattle. It was formerly one of two such breeds in Portugal, the other being the Brava de Lide of continental Portugal; the two breeds were merged in 2010. On the island of Terceira the cattle are used in the tourada à corda, a local form of bull-running.

== History ==
The Brava dos Açores derives from the Brava de Lide of continental Portugal and from the Cabrera, Vazqueña and Vistahermosa strains of the related Spanish Toro de Lidia breed of fighting cattle. It originated on the island of Terceira, but in the twenty-first century is found also on Faial, Flores, Graciosa, Pico, São Jorge and São Miguel.

In 2010 the government of the autonomous region of the Azores resolved to register the local breed as a variant of the national Brava de Lide. Nevertheless it continued to be reported to the DAD-IS database as a distinct breed. There is no breed society; the entity responsible for the herd-book is the Direção Regional da Agricultura, Veterinária e Alimentação of the Government of the Azores.

In 2016 the total number of the cattle was estimated to be between 3328 and 3650, with 1339 breeding cows and 1005 bulls in service, in the hands of 35 breeders; in 2024 the breeding stock recorded in the herd-book consisted of 806 cows and 547 bulls in 38 herds. By 2026 the number of cattle had fallen to 1861–2012, with 753 breeding cows and 528 active bulls, while the number of breeders had risen to 54.

Its conservation status was not listed in 2007 by the Food and Agriculture Organization of the United Nations; in 2026 it was listed in DAD-IS as 'at risk/endangered'.

== Characteristics ==
The Brava dos Açores is most often black, but may also be of any other solid colour other than white; a wide variety of mixed coat colours and markings are seen. The cattle are generally smaller and of lighter build than in other breeds of fighting cattle. The horns are slender and usually point upwards; they are most often white as far as the tips, which are black.

== Use ==
The Brava dos Açores is used in bullfights. On the island of Terceira the cattle are used in the traditional tourada à corda form of bull-running through the streets, in which the bull is tethered on a long rope and young men perform acts of bravery near it. More than two hundred such events take place between May and October each year.
