= Minhota =

Portuguese breed of cattle

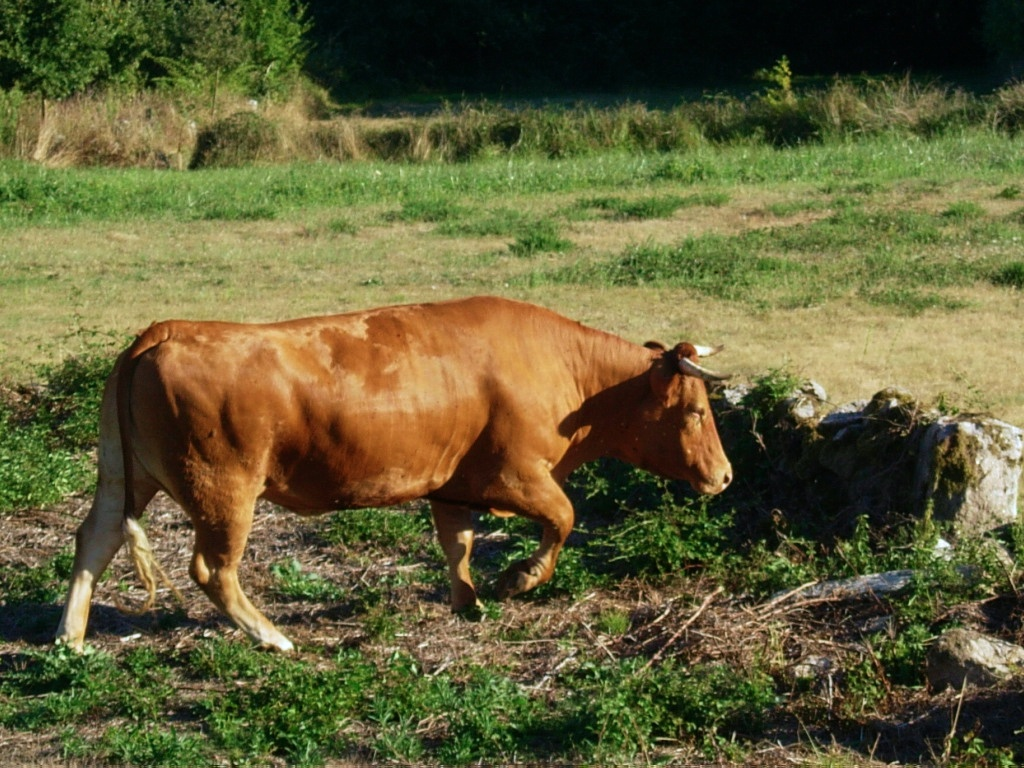
- Conservation status: FAO (2007): not at risk; DAD-IS (2021): at risk
- Other names: Galega
- Country of origin: Portugal
- Distribution: former province of Minho, principally Viana do Castelo
- Use: beef; draught; milk

Traits
- Height: Male: 145 cm; Female: 140 cm
- Cattle; Bos (primigenius) taurus

The Minhota or Galega is a Portuguese breed of cattle. It is reared principally for beef; in the past it was used also as a draught beast and for milk.

== History ==
The Minhota originated in the former Minho province of northern Portugal, from which its name derives, and particularly in the northern part thereof, now the Viana do Castelo District.

In the past it was variously known as the Minhota or as the Galega, or by both names. It was widespread and numerous; in the middle years of the nineteenth century it numbered about 65 000 head, and constituted some 50% of all cattle in Minho. By 1940 numbers had fallen to about 9500. The breed received formal recognition as the Galega in 1996; a breed society, the Associação Portuguesa dos Criadores de Bovinos da Raça Minhota, was formed in that year, and a herd-book established in 1997. In 2002 the name of the breed was changed to Minhota so as better to distinguish it from the Spanish Rubia Gallega breed of Galicia immediately to the north.

In 2007 the conservation status of the breed was listed by the FAO as "not at risk". In 2016 the population was reported to be about 13 000 head, with 120 bulls and over 7000 breeding cows. In 2021 its status was reported to DAD-IS as "at risk". In 2016 it was distributed mainly in the former province of Entre-Douro-e-Minho, the modern districts of Viana do Castelo and Braga; its range extends into the districts of Porto and Vila Real, in the former provinces of Douro Litoral and Trás-os-Montes e Alto Douro respectively.

The Minhota is genetically close to the Ramo Grande of the Azores, and may have contributed to the development of the Arouquesa and the Marinhoa of Portugal and the Caracu of Brazil.

== Use ==
The Minhota is reared principally for beef. In the past it was kept also as a draught beast and for its milk.
