= Garvonesa =

Portuguese breed of cattle

- Conservation status: FAO (2007): endangeredDAD-IS (2025): at risk
- Other names: Chamusca
- Country of origin: Portugal
- Distribution: Alentejo
- Cattle; Bos (primigenius) taurus

The Garvonesa or Chamusca is a Portuguese breed of draught cattle originating in the historic region of Alentejo, in southern Portugal. It is distributed principally in the concelhos or former concelhos of Alcáçovas (now part of Viana do Alentejo), Almodôvar, Barrancos, Castro Verde, Odemira, Ourique, Santiago do Cacém and Vila Nova de Sao Bento (now part of Serpa).

== History ==
The Garvonesa is a traditional draught breed of the valley of the Rio Mira in south-western Alentejo. It is believed to be intermediate between the Alentejana breed of Alentejo – to which microsatellite studies have shown it to be closely related – and the Algarvia of the Algarve region to the south.

It was reared principally for draught work, to which it was well suited. With the mechanisation of agriculture and transport in the years following the Second World War, it was no longer in demand for this purpose, and attention turned to other breeds with better aptitude for meat production. By the late twentieth century it had become gravely endangered. A conservation programme was initiated in the Parque Natural do Sudoeste Alentejano e Costa Vicentina in 1994, and a herd-book was established in the same year; since 2000 this has been held by the Associação de Agricultores do Campo Branco.

In the twenty-first century the Garvonesa is distributed principally in the concelhos of Almodôvar, Barrancos, Castro Verde, Odemira and Ourique, and the former concelho of Vila Nova de Sao Bento (now part of Serpa), all in Beja District; the former concelho of Alcáçovas – now part of Viana do Alentejo – in Evora District; and the concelho of Santiago do Cacém in Setúbal District. In 2004 the population was reported as 145 cows in 7 herds; in 2024 the total number was estimated to be 1160–1293 head, with a breeding stock of 665 cows and 27 active bulls.

== Characteristics ==
The coat is generally a dark reddish brown or deep chestnut in colour. In cows, the head and withers are black, as are the lower legs and the tail; it is from this that the name Chamusca derives, from chamuscar, 'scorch'. In bulls the black coloration is more extensive, but does not usually extend to the dorsal region.
