= Mirandesa =

Portuguese breed of cattle

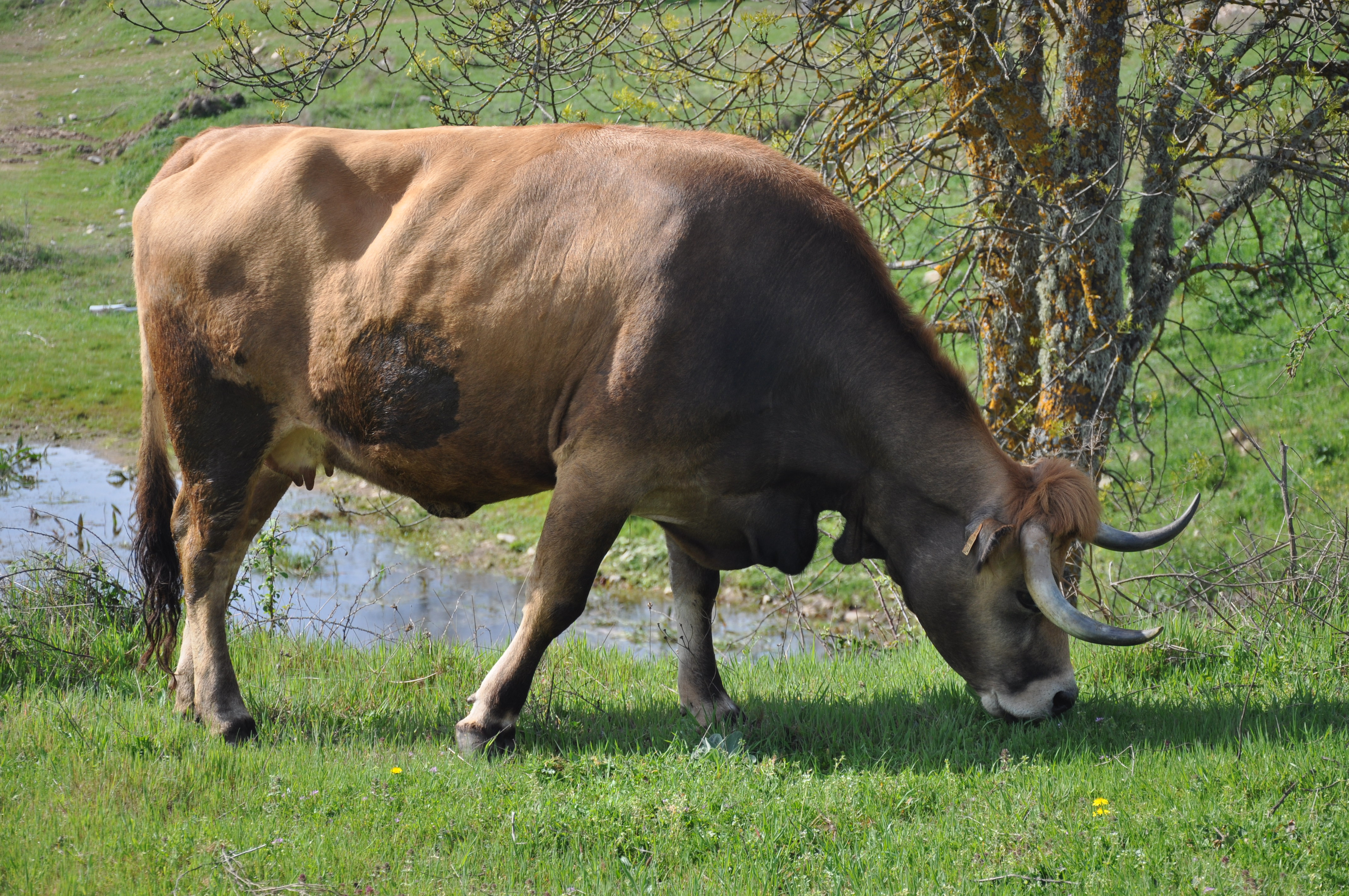

- Conservation status: FAO (2007): not at risk; DAD-IS (2023): at risk/vulnerable
- Other names: Barciana; Beirão; Bragancesa; Jarmelo; Mirandês Extremenho; Ratinho Serrano
- Country of origin: Portugal
- Standard: Direção Geral de Alimentação e Veterinária (in Portuguese)
- Use: formerly draught, now meat

Traits
- Weight: Male: average 1024 kg; Female: average 630 kg
- Height: Male: average 140 cm; Female: average 130 cm
- Coat: dark reddish-brown, darker at the extremities
- Cattle; Bos (primigenius) taurus

The Mirandesa is a Portuguese breed of beef cattle. It originates in – and is named for – the Terra de Miranda, the area of north-eastern Portugal where Mirandese is spoken, particularly the municipality of Miranda do Douro. It was formerly used as a draught animal, and was distributed throughout almost all of the country. It is now reared for beef; the meat may be marketed as Denominação de Origem Controlada ('Protected Designation of Origin').

== History ==
The Mirandesa is a traditional breed of draught cattle. It originates in – and is named for – the Terra de Miranda, the area of north-eastern Portugal where Mirandese is spoken, particularly the municipality of Miranda do Douro in the traditional district of Bragança in the Norte region.

Various sub-types were identified within the breed, among them the Bragancesa of Bragança, the Beirão of Beira, the Mirandês Extremenho or Ratinho Serrano, and the Jarmelo. This last was established as a separate breed in 2007, with the name Jarmelista.

A herd-book for the Mirandesa was established in 1959, the first in the country. Numbers in the 1960s and 1970s were some 150000–200000 head, and the breed was distributed throughout most of Portugal, with the exception only of the former province of Minho in the north-west (now consisting of the districts of Braga and Viana do Castelo) and the Algarve region in the south. In the later twentieth century the combined effects of the arrival in Portugal of more productive imported cattle and the mechanisation of agriculture, with its consequent reduction in demand for draught oxen, brought about a rapid fall in numbers; by the early 1990s the remaining stock was again mostly in the Terra de Miranda.

In 2007 the conservation status of the breed was listed by the FAO as 'not at risk'. In 2020 a population of 5535 head – 5230 cows and 305 bulls – was reported to DAD-IS, which in 2023 listed the conservation status of the breed as 'at risk/vulnerable'.

The larger Marinhoa cattle of the district of Aveiro derive principally from the Mirandesa, possibly with some intromission from Minhota stock.

== Characteristics ==
The Mirandesa is a dark red-brown in colour, with some darkening towards the extremities; cows are more variable in shade than bulls. Average weights are 1024 kg for bulls and 630 kg for cows; average heights at the withers are 140 cm and 130 cm respectively.

Like the Arouquesa, the Mirandesa is related to the five Spanish breeds that make up the Morena Galega or Morenas del Noroeste group – the Cachena, the Caldelana or Caldelá, the Frieiresa, the Limiana or Limiá, and the Vianesa.

== Use ==
The Mirandesa was traditionally used as a draught animal. It was the principal cattle breed of Portugal and was distributed in large numbers throughout most of the country.

It is now reared for beef; the meat may be marketed as Denominação de Origem Controlada ('Protected Designation of Origin').
