= Marinhoa =

Portuguese breed of cattle

- Conservation status: Relatório Nacional (2004): at risk; FAO (2007): not at risk; DAD-IS (2026): at risk/endangered-maintained
- Other names: Marinhão
- Country of origin: Portugal
- Distribution: former province of Beira Litoral; Aveiro District; Coimbra District
- Standard: Direção Geral de Alimentação e Veterinária (in Portuguese)
- Use: formerly draught, now meat

Traits
- Weight: Male: 800–950 kg; Female: 550–620 kg
- Height: Male: 150 cm; Female: 140 cm
- Skin colour: pigmented
- Coat: yellow or pale brown, from straw-coloured to chestnut
- Horn status: horned
- Cattle; Bos (primigenius) taurus

The Marinhoa is a Portuguese breed of cattle. It originated in coastal areas of the former province of Beira Litoral, and in the twenty-first century is distributed in approximately the same area, now within the districts of Aveiro and Coimbra. It is broadly similar to the Mirandesa of north-eastern Portugal, but is larger; it may also have been influenced by the Minhota of the former province of Minho in north-western Portugal. In the nineteenth century it was known as the Marinhão.

== History ==
The Marinhoa originated in coastal areas of the districts of Aveiro and Coimbra, which were formerly parts of the historic province of Beira Litoral; in the twenty-first century is distributed in approximately the same area. It is documented from the second half of the nineteenth century; an early description is that of the agronomist Silvestre Bernardo de Lima, published in 1870. He reports that it was found principally on two types of terrain: the gandra or scrubland; and the marinhas or coastal lowlands on the seaward side of the sand dunes – from which its name derives.

In the early twentieth century the cattle remained numerous; a census in the 1940s recorded a population of 24000 head. The breed had spread from its original area of distribution – the concelhos of Aveiro, Estarreja, Ílhavo, Murtosa, Ovar and Vagos – into those of Águeda, Albergaria-a-Velha, Cantanhede, Mealhada, Mira, Oliveira do Bairro and Sever do Vouga.

With the progressive mechanisation of agriculture in the years after the Second World War, the traditional uses of the cattle disappeared and numbers fell. A herd-book was started by the Direcção Geral de Pecuária in either 1986 or 1988. A breed society – the Associação de Criadores da Raça Marinhoa – was formed in 1992 and later that year was officially approved to manage the herd-book.

== Characteristics ==
The Marinhoa is broadly similar to the Mirandesa of north-eastern Portugal, but is larger. Body weights are normally in the range 550 to 620 kg for cows and 800 to 950 kg for bulls, with average heights at the withers of about 140 cm and 150 cm respectively. The coat is yellow or pale brown, varying from a pale straw-colour to a deep red or chestnut, with a pale ring round the muzzle; bulls are generally darker than cows. The hair round the eyes, on the tip of the tail, on the edges of the ears and on the dewlap is often black or dark brown. The hooves and mucosae are pigmented.

The average interval between calvings in cows is 472±133 days, and the average productive lifespan is 78.8±46.5 months.

== Use ==
The Marinhoa was formerly a draught animal, used for a wide variety of tasks in the coastal lowlands and in the fertile valleys and estuaries of the rivers of Aveiro – such as the Antuã, the Cértima and the Vouga. It was used to work and seed the ground in the rice fields, to haul the moliço (seaweed) used as agricultural fertiliser, to power water-wheels, to haul boats and to haul in the nets in the traditional arte xávega, shore-based fishing with nets.

In the twenty-first century it is reared for beef. The meat may be marketed as 'Carne Marinhoa', which has European Denominação de Origem Protegida status.
