= Algarvia (cattle) =

Portuguese breed of cattle

- Conservation status: FAO (2007): extinct; DAD-IS (2025): critical-maintained
- Country of origin: Portugal
- Distribution: Algarve
- Cattle; Bos (primigenius) taurus

The Algarvia is a Portuguese breed of triple-purpose cattle originating in the Algarve region of southern Portugal. It is a historic breed of the region, documented as such from 1868. After a period of cross-breeding with imported Charolaise and Limousine stock in the second half of the twentieth century, the original breed came to be considered extinct. It was re-established in the early twenty-first century from a small nucleus of surviving animals.

The breed society is the Associação de Criadores de Gado do Algarve. In 2024 the breeding stock consisted of 25 cows and 2 bulls, in two herds.

The coat is red or chestnut in colour, darker than the golden yellow of the original breed. Body weights are greater than in the original breed, at about 600 kg for cows and 800 kg for bulls.
