= Brava de Lide =

Portuguese breed of cattle

- Conservation status: Relatório Nacional (2004): not at risk; FAO (2007): not listed; DAD-IS (2026): not at risk
- Country of origin: Portugal
- Distribution: Alentejo; Azores; Beira Interior; Beira Litoral; Oeste; Ribatejo
- Standard: Direção Geral de Alimentação e Veterinária (in Portuguese)
- Use: bull-fighting

Traits
- Weight: Male: average 500 kg or 700 kg; Female: average 300 kg or 400 kg
- Height: Male: average 140 cm; Female: average 120 cm
- Skin colour: usually pigmented
- Coat: usually black or red; or any other colour
- Horn status: medium-long horns
- Cattle; Bos (primigenius) taurus

The Brava de Lide is the Portuguese breed of fighting cattle. It was formerly one of two such breeds in Portugal, the other being the Brava dos Açores of the Azores archipelago; the two were merged in 2010.

== History ==
The Brava de Lide originates in the populations of feral cattle that formerly roamed unpopulated areas of the mountains and moorlands of Portugal. In the Middle Ages these were hunted by mounted horsemen for sport or for food. In later centuries, when land was being brought under cultivation, oxen were needed to break and later to work the ground. Feral bulls were captured, castrated and broken to the yoke; at times there were spectators for these processes, which were sometimes performed in an enclosure or ring – the origin of bullfighting as a sport. Selective breeding of the cattle for aggression and fighting ability began in the eighteenth century. The oldest existing ganadaria ('breeding estate') in Portugal – Vaz Monteiro – was established in 1843. A breed society, the Associação Portuguesa de Criadores de Toiros de Lide, was formed in 1977, and a herd-book was started in 1986, at which time there were about 7000 cows and 190 breeding bulls.

The history, traditions and breeding practices of the Brava de Lide have many similarities to those of the Toro de Lidia; in particular, each population consists principally of a number of separate strains, lines or encastes, each maintained by a single breeder or ganadaria. This results in a population with high levels both of inbreeding and of genetic diversity.

In 2004 the conservation status of the breed was listed in Portugal as 'not at risk', the only breed of cattle not considered to be at risk at that time. In 2026 a population of between 18050 and 20139 head – with 10445 breeding cows and 267 bulls in service – was reported to DAD-IS, and its conservation status was again listed as 'not at risk'.

== Characteristics ==
The Brava de Lide is usually either solid black or solid red, but may also be of any other colour; the mucosae are usually, but not invariably, pigmented. The cattle are in general both taller and heavier than those of the Toro de Lidia of Spain: body weights average 400 kg for cows and 700 kg for bulls, and average heights at the withers are 120 cm and 140 cm respectively.

== Use ==
The Brava de Lide is bred principally for bullfighting. Portuguese bullfights follow the tourada à antiga portuguesa tradition, in which the protagonist is the cavaleiro – an expert rider mounted on a highly-schooled Lusitano horse – and in which the bull is not killed in the arena. Meat from cattle of the breed – if produced under specific conditions within an area consisting of the entire districts of Beja, Évora, Portalegre and Santarém; the concelhos of Alcácer do Sal, Alcochete, Grândola, Montijo, Palmela, Santiago do Cacém and Sines in the district of Setúbal, of Alenquer, Arruda dos Vinhos, Azambuja and Vila Franca de Xira in the district of Lisbon and of Idanha-a-Nova in the district of Castelo Branco, as well as the parish of Arazede in the concelho of Montemor-o-Velho in the district of Coimbra – may be marketed as Carne de Bravo do Ribatejo, which has European Denominação de Origem Controlada status.
