= Arouquesa =

Portuguese breed of cattle

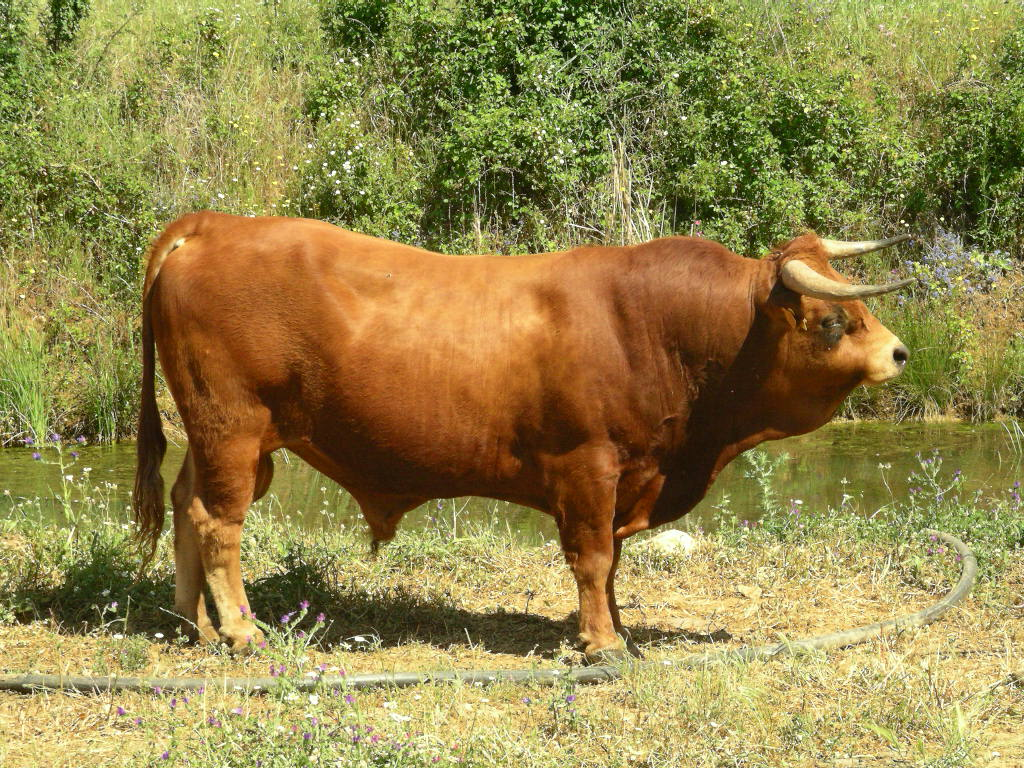
- A bull

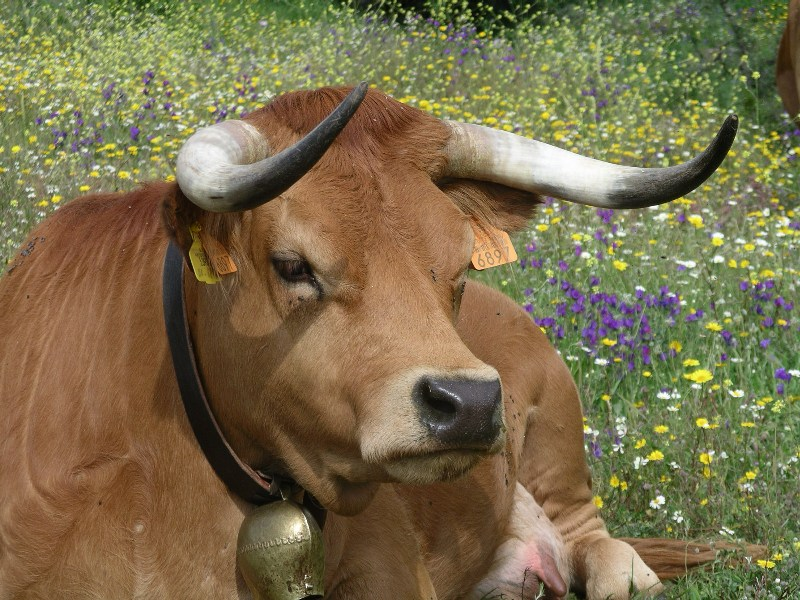
- A cow
- Conservation status: FAO (2007): not at risk; DAD-IS (2025): at risk/vulnerable
- Other names: Canavese; Caramuleiro; Paivoto; Serrano; Sulano
- Country of origin: Portugal
- Distribution: Aveiro; Braga; Porto; Viseu
- Cattle; Bos (primigenius) taurus

The Arouquesa is a Portuguese breed of triple-purpose cattle, distributed mainly in the districts of Aveiro, Braga, Porto and Viseu in northern Portugal. It is named for the town of Arouca in the district of Aveiro.

It is used for draught work – although less so than in the past – is reared for beef, and has some dairy qualities. Beef from cattle reared by traditional methods within a specified area of northern Portugal has Denominação de Origem Protegida status and may be marketed as Carne Arouquesa DOP.

== History ==
It is distributed in northern Portugal, mainly in the districts of Aveiro, Braga, Porto and Viseu. The largest numbers are in the concelhos of Arouca, Castelo de Paiva, Castro Daire, Cinfães, Resende, Sao Pedro do Sul and Vale de Cambra south of the Douro, and Amarante, Baião and Marco de Canaveses to the north.

== Characteristics ==
The cows reach a height of 1.23 m (4.0 ft), the bulls 1.36 m (4.5 ft), so the Arouquesas can be described as small. The breed's weight is around 360–430 kg (790–950 lb). Their hair colour is light brown although the males may become a little darker than females. Mucosa and claws are dark coloured. The wide horns are directed forward, first down and then up.

Arouquesas are adapted to the mountains - their hind legs are very muscular. In Portugal today they still work as draught cattle. In the past century oxen often were exported to Great Britain because of their beef. In 1902 Arouquesa beef was the winner of the "Award for the Best Beef" in Paris. The animals are very long-living; 16–18 calves per cow are not uncommon. Most times they practice mother cow husbandry. The animals are very affable but active.
