= Alentejana =

Cattle breed

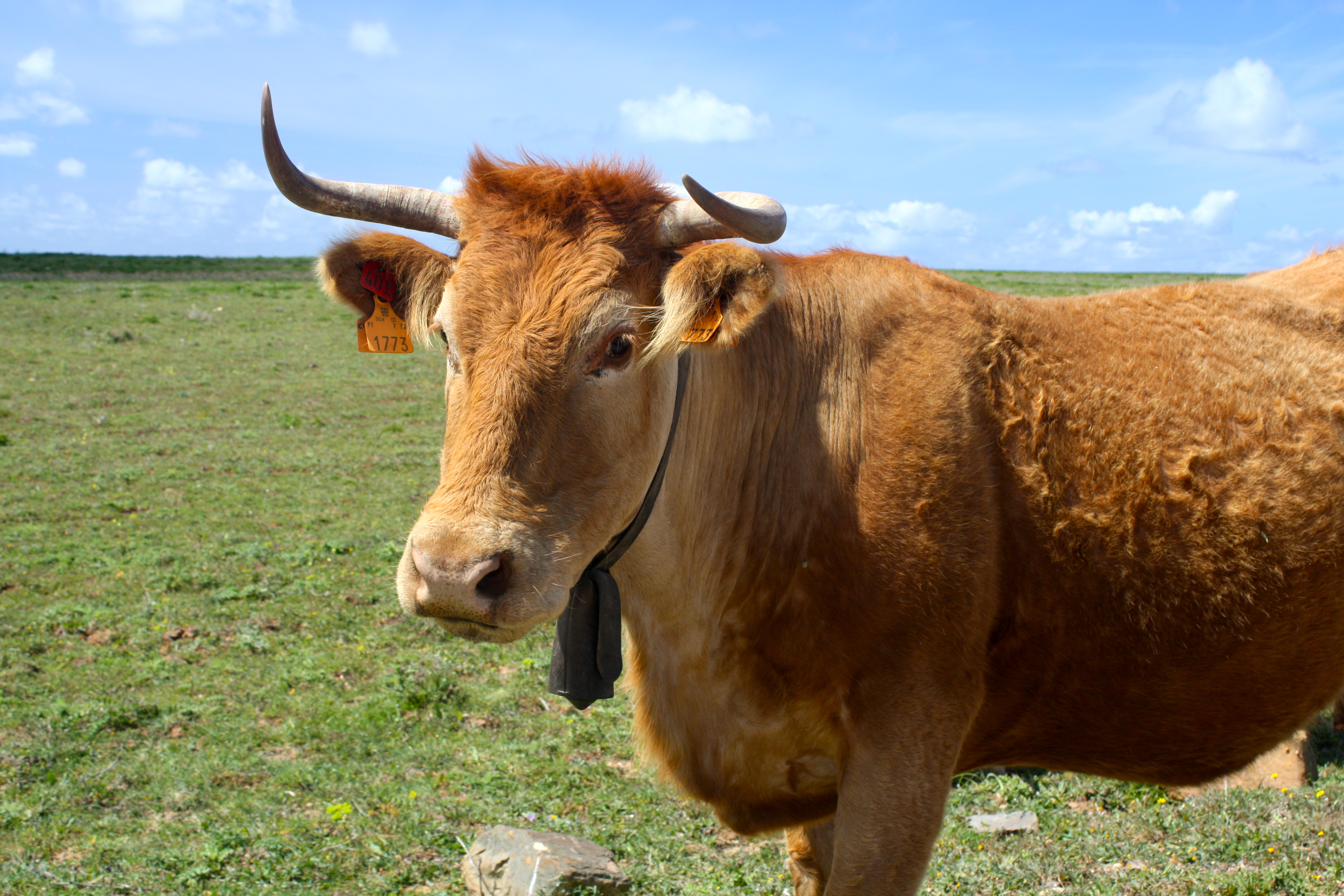
An Alentejana in the Algarve

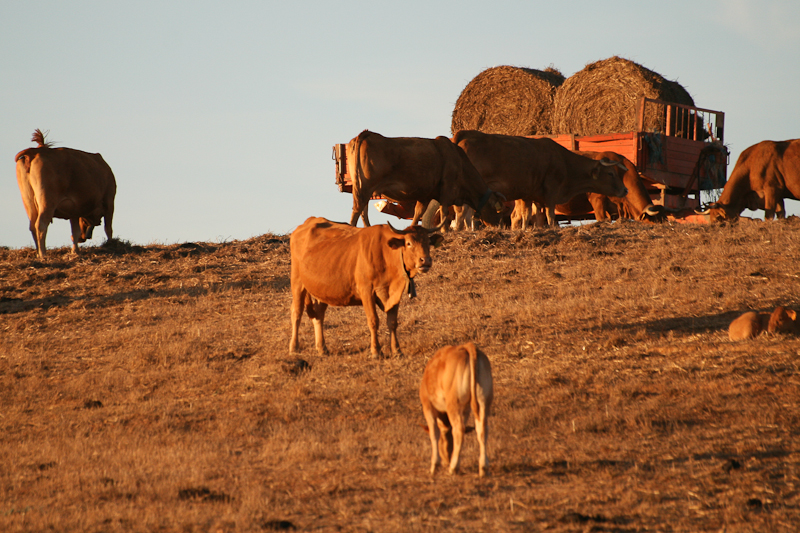
Herd in Cercal do Alentejo

The Alentejana is a cattle breed from Portugal that was the main breed raised for meat in Southern Portugal historically. The Alentejana breed has the protected geographical status of DOC (Denominação de Origem Controlada) from the European Commission. Genetics show that it contains DNA from Africa that may have arrived during the era the region was under Muslim control. It is closely related to the Spanish Retinta breed.

The breed region is circumscribed almost exclusively to the Southern Portuguese Region of Alentejo, in both, High and Low Alentejo.

The race is represented by rustic, energetic and gentle animals that in the recent past were used to work.
