= List of Spanish cattle breeds =

This is a list of the cattle breeds usually considered to have originated in Spain.

Local name	English name, if any	Notes	Image
Albera^{[1]}^{[2]}^{[4]}			
Alistana-Sanabresa^{[1]}^{[2]}^{[4]}^{[5]}			
Almanzoreña^{[1]}		extinct	
Asturiana de la Montaña^{[1]}^{[2]}^{[4]}^{[5]}	Asturian Mountain		
Asturiana de los Valles^{[1]}^{[2]}^{[3]}^{[5]}	Asturian Valley		
Avileña-Negra Ibérica^{[1]}^{[2]}^{[3]}^{[5]}			
Avileña-Negra Ibérica (variedad Bociblanca)^{[1]}^{[2]}^{[4]}			
Berrenda en Colorado^{[1]}^{[2]}^{[4]}^{[5]}			
Berrenda en Negro^{[1]}^{[2]}^{[4]}^{[5]}			
Betizu^{[1]}^{[2]}^{[4]}^{[5]}			
Blanca Cacereña^{[1]}^{[2]}^{[4]}			
Bruna dels Pirineus^{[1]}^{[2]}^{[4]}^{[5]}			
Cachena^{[1]}^{[2]}^{[4]}			
Calasparrena^{[1]}		extinct	
Caldelá^{[1]}^{[2]}^{[4]}			
Campurriana^{[1]}		extinct	
Canaria^{[1]}^{[2]}^{[4]}; Vaca Canaria^{[5]}			
Cárdena Andaluza^{[1]}^{[2]}^{[4]}			
Frieiresa^{[1]}^{[2]}^{[4]}			
Lebaniega^{[1]}		extinct	
Leonese^{[1]}		extinct	
Lidia^{[1]}^{[2]}^{[3]}; Toro de Lidia^{[5]}	Spanish Fighting Bull		
Limiá^{[1]}^{[2]}^{[4]}			
Lorquina^{[1]}		extinct	
Mallorquina^{[1]}^{[2]}^{[4]}^{[5]}			
Marinera^{[1]}		extinct	
Marismeña^{[1]}^{[2]}^{[4]}^{[5]}			
Menorquina^{[1]}^{[2]}^{[4]}^{[5]}			
Monchina^{[1]}^{[2]}^{[4]}^{[5]}			
Morucha^{[1]}^{[2]}^{[3]}^{[5]}			
Morucha (variedad Negra)^{[1]}^{[2]}^{[4]}			
Mostrenca^{[5]}			
Murciana-Levantina^{[1]}^{[2]}^{[4]}			
Negra Andaluza^{[1]}^{[2]}^{[4]}^{[5]}			
Pajuna^{[1]}^{[2]}^{[4]}^{[5]}			
Pallaresa^{[1]}^{[2]}			
Palmera^{[1]}^{[2]}^{[4]}; Vaca Palmera^{[5]}			
Parda de Montaña^{[1]}^{[3]}^{[5]}			
Pasiega^{[1]}^{[2]}^{[4]}^{[5]}			
Pirenaica^{[1]}^{[2]}^{[3]}^{[5]}			
Retinta^{[1]}^{[2]}^{[3]}^{[5]}			
Rubia Gallega^{[1]}^{[2]}^{[3]}^{[5]}			
Santander^{[1]}		extinct	
Sayaguesa^{[1]}^{[2]}^{[4]}^{[5]}			
Serrana de Teruel^{[1]}^{[2]}^{[4]}^{[5]}			
Serrana Negra^{[1]}^{[2]}^{[4]}			
Terreña^{[1]}^{[2]}^{[4]}			
Toro de Casta Navarra^{[1]}			
Tudanca^{[1]}^{[2]}^{[4]}^{[5]}			
Vianesa^{[1]}^{[2]}^{[4]}			
