= Vianesa =

Spanish breed of cattle

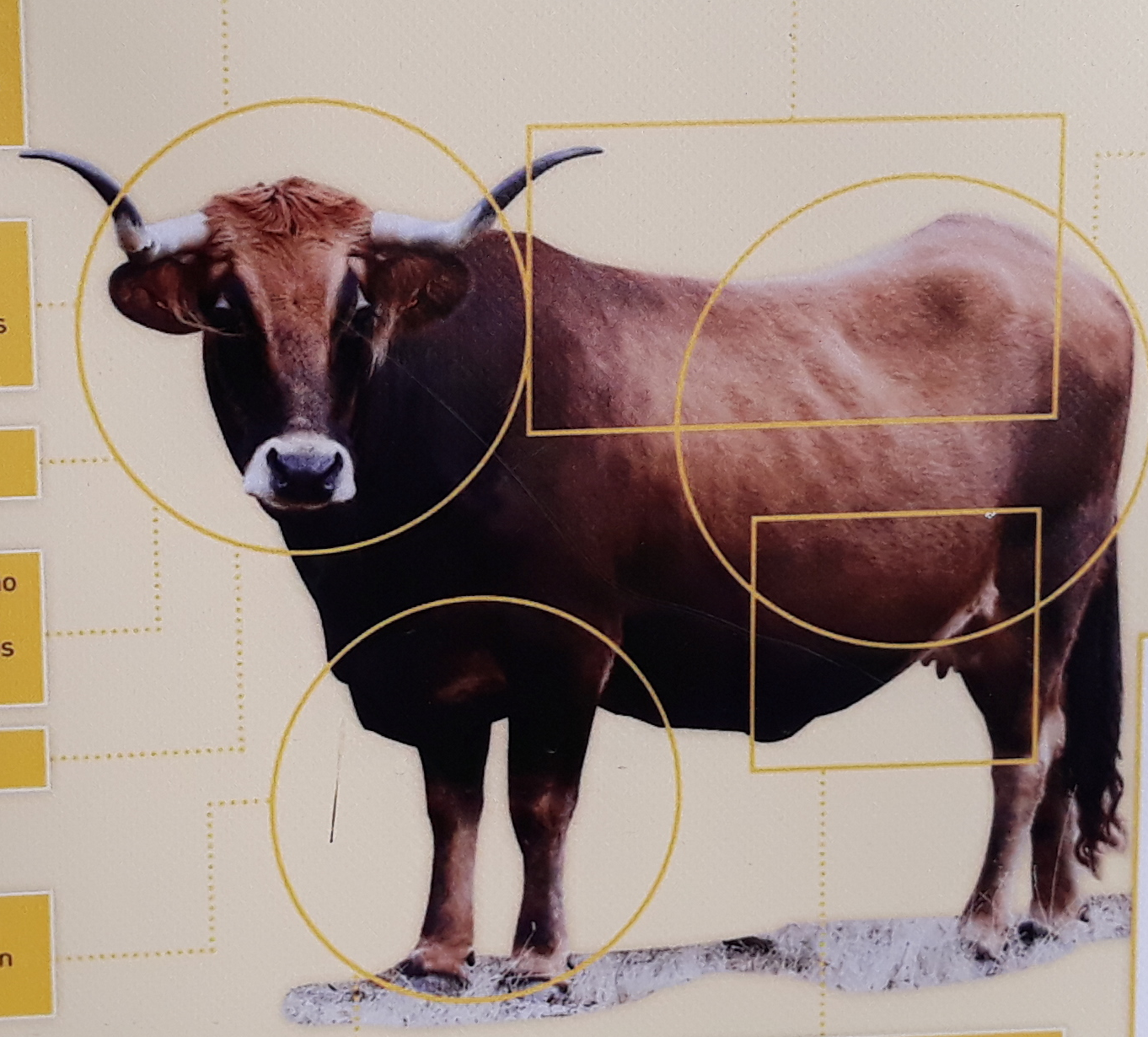
- Image from an information placard on the breed
- Conservation status: FAO (2007): endangered-maintained; DAD-IS (2023): at risk/endangered-maintained
- Country of origin: Spain
- Distribution: Galicia
- Standard: Ministerio de Agricultura, Pesca y Alimentación (page 12, in Spanish)
- Use: beef

Traits
- Weight: Male: 850 kg; Female: 560 kg
- Height: Male: 138 cm; Female: 132 cm
- Coat: dark chestnut brown, variable
- Horn status: horned
- Cattle; Bos (primigenius) taurus

The Vianesa is a traditional Spanish breed of cattle originating in the autonomous community of Galicia in north-western Spain. It is named either for the municipality of Viana do Bolo in the province of Ourense in south-eastern Galicia, close to the border with northern Portugal, or for the comarca of Viana in which that municipality lies. With the Cachena, the Caldelana or Caldelá, the Frieiresa and the Limiana or Limiá, it forms part of the grouping of dark brown cattle known as the Morena Galega or Morenas del Noroeste (roughly 'dark-browns of the north-west').

It is an endangered breed: in 2023 it was listed in DAD-IS as 'at risk/endangered-maintained'. The population in 2022 was just under 3000 head in 56 farms, almost all in Galicia; about 80 cattle were at a farm in Castilla y León.

== History ==
The Vianesa is a traditional breed of the autonomous community of Galicia in north-western Spain. It is named either for the municipality of Viana do Bolo in the province of Ourense in south-eastern Galicia, close to the border with northern Portugal, or for the comarca of Viana in which that municipality lies. With the Cachena, the Caldelana or Caldelá, the Frieiresa and the Limiana or Limiá, it forms part of the grouping of dark brown cattle known as the Morena Galega or Morenas del Noroeste (roughly 'dark-browns of the north-west'), for which a conservation programme was launched by the Xunta de Galicia in 1990.

In 2023 the conservation status of the breed was listed in DAD-IS as 'at risk/endangered-maintained'. The population in 2022 was just under 3000 head in 56 farms, almost all of them in Galicia; about 80 head were at a farm in Castilla y León.

== Characteristics ==
The coat is dark brown in colour, and darker at the extremities; bulls are darker than cows. Some cattle have patches of different shades of brown; these are names for some of the patterns that these form. Heights at the withers average 132 cm for cows and 138 cm for bulls. Average weights are variously given as 560 kg or 593 kg for cows and 850 kg or 913 kg for bulls.

== Use ==
The cattle are reared for beef.
