= Sebastián de Aparicio =

Beatified Franciscan

Blessed Sebastián de Aparicio y del Pardo O.F.M.
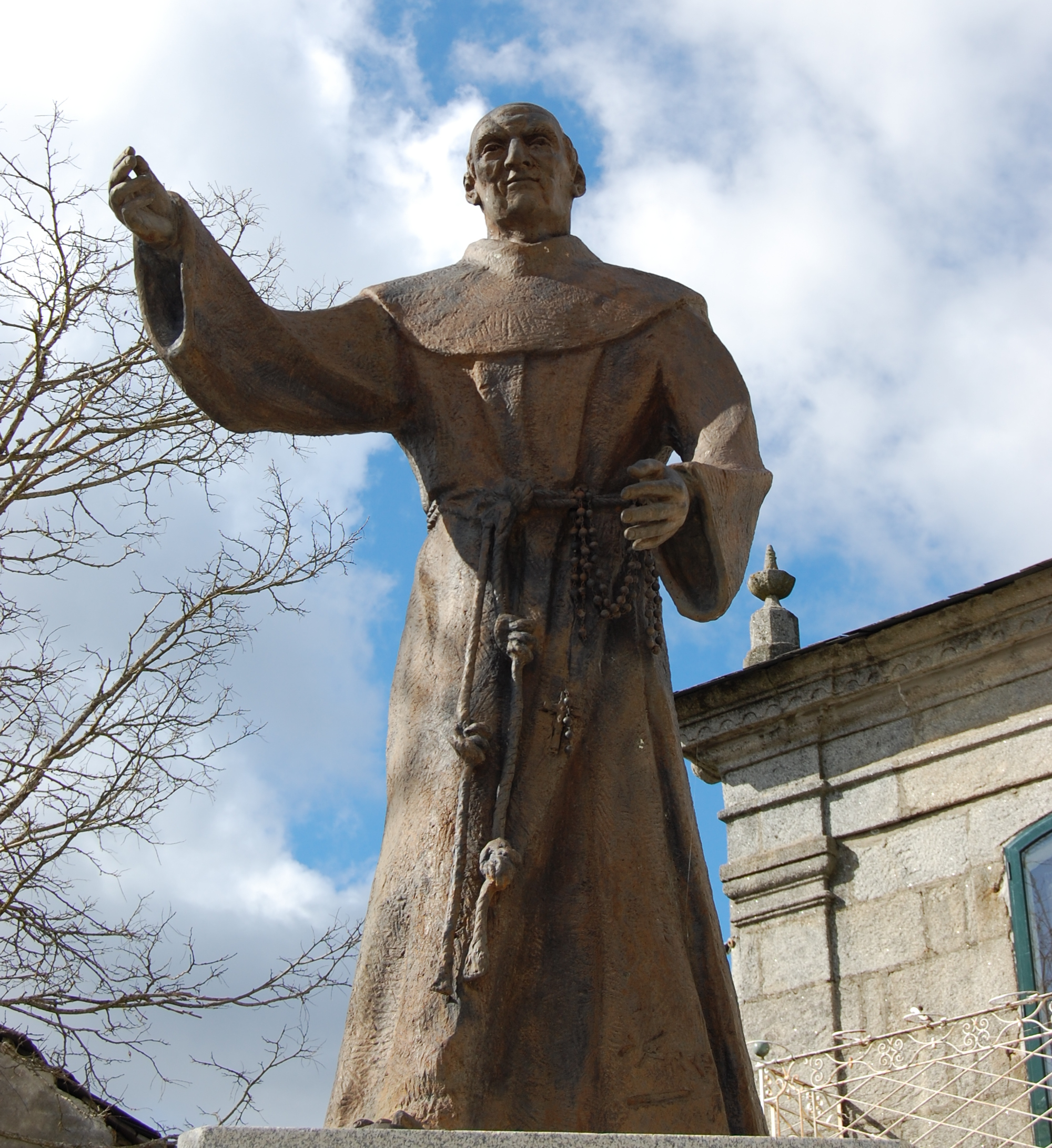
- A statue of the Blessed Sebastián outside the Franciscan church of Puebla where his incorrupt body is preserved for veneration

Widower, Religious and Confessor
- Born: 20 January 1502; A Gudiña, Ourense, Spain
- Died: 25 February 1600 (aged 98); Puebla de los Ángeles, Puebla, Mexico, New Spain
- Venerated in: Roman Catholic Church (Mexico and the Order of Friars Minor)
- Beatified: 17 May 1789 by Pope Pius VI
- Feast: 25 February
- Attributes: Oxcart with oxen
- Patronage: Transport industry (Mexico)

Sebastián de Aparicio y del Pardo (20 January 1502 – 25 February 1600) was a Spanish colonist in Mexico shortly after its conquest by Spain, who after a lifetime as a rancher and road builder entered the Order of Friars Minor as a lay brother. He spent the next 26 years of his long life as a beggar for the Order and died with a great reputation for holiness. He has been beatified by the Catholic Church.

== Early life ==
Aparicio was born in A Gudiña, Ourense, in the Galician region of Spain. He was the third child and only son of Juan de Aparicio and Teresa del Prado, who were poor, but pious peasants, and spent his childhood tending sheep and cattle and in service to those of means. He learned his prayers from his parents, but had no schooling, and was not able to read or write. Despite his illiteracy, he had absorbed how to lead a pious and holy life so that he could emulate models in hagiographic texts. According to his own account, his life was saved in a seemingly-miraculous way during an outbreak of the bubonic plague in his town in 1514. Forced to isolate him from the community in quarantine, his parents built a hidden shelter for him in the woods, where they left him. While lying there helpless, due to his illness, a she-wolf found the hiding spot and, poking her head into his hiding spot, sniffed and then bit and licked an infected site on his body, before running off. He began to heal from that moment.

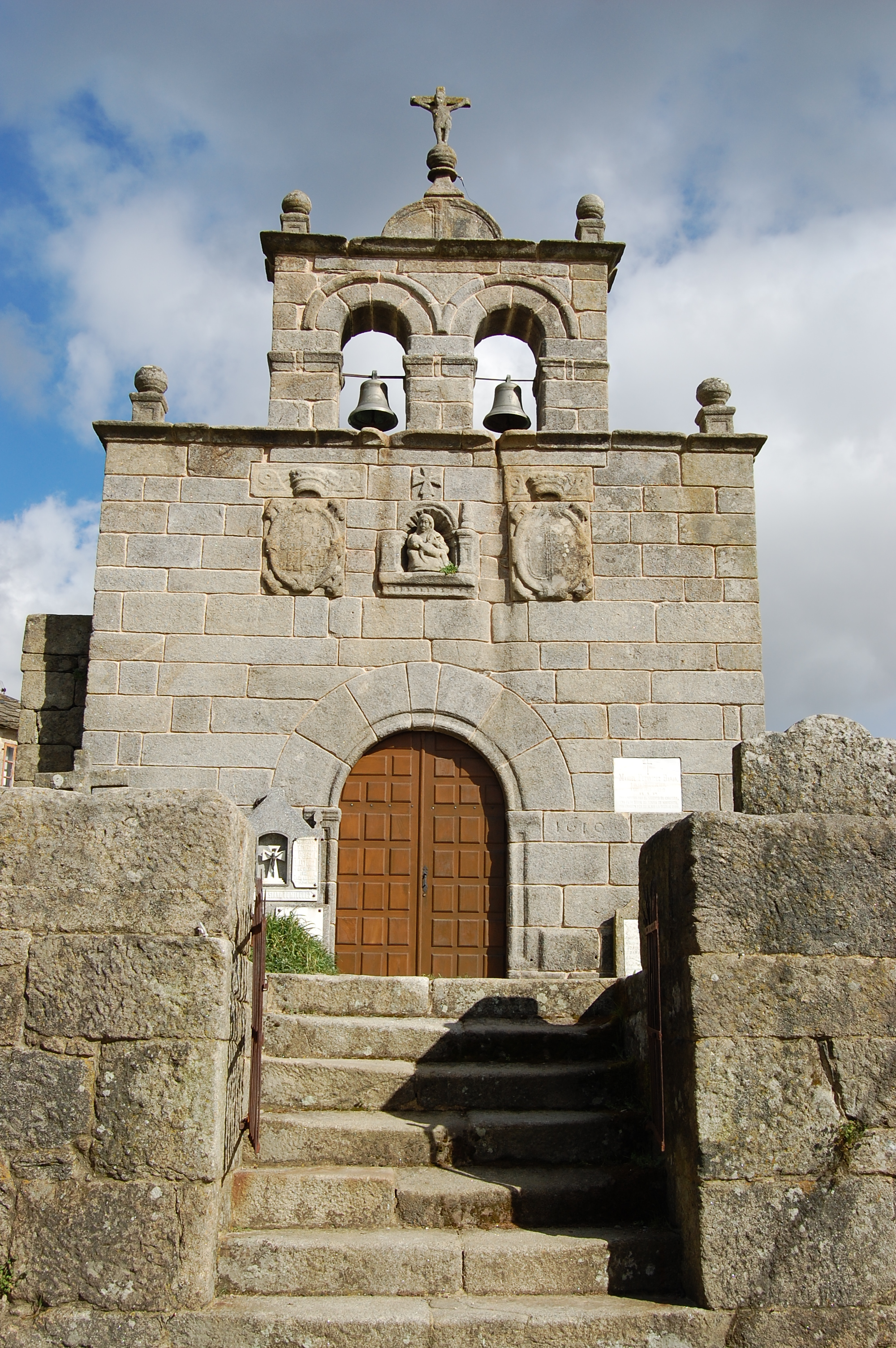
Parish church of Gudiña, where the Blessed Sebastián was baptized as a newborn

When Aparicio was older, he determined to seek work outside his region in order to help support his family and to provide dowries for his sisters. He traveled east to Salamanca and then as far south as Sanlúcar de Barrameda. He finally decided to improve his fortune by traveling to the Americas.

== Mexico ==
=== Successful Entrepreneur ===
Aparicio sailed from Spain in 1533, landing in Veracruz later that year. With the growth of the cattle trade introduced to the Americas by the Spanish and the land grants offered to colonists by the Spanish government, he decided to move farther inland to Puebla de los Ángeles, recently founded by the Franciscan friar, Toribio de Benavente Motolinia, one of the Twelve Apostles of Mexico who came to New Spain in 1524 to evangelize the Indians.

Once settled in Puebla, Aparicio began to cultivate indigenous maize but also European wheat. He was one of the first Spaniards who raised and trained cattle, another European import, to use in plow farming and transportation. He got permission to ride out into the brush and round up wild cattle which he then trained to pull a cart. As a result, he is considered to be the first Mexican “cowboy” or charro. He realized the difficulty of transporting supplies in Mexico, which before the conquest had no domesticated animals to move goods and difficult terrain, which meant that transport between growing Spanish settlements impeded economic expansion. The burden the lack of decent roads fell on both the native peoples and animals forced to bear the loads on poor and uneven surfaces through the mountains cutting the countryside. He then conceived the idea of building roads from Puebla to the port of Veracruz, Mexico's main link to Spain. He recruited a fellow Spaniard as a partner in the enterprise, and they approached the colonial authorities for a grant to undertake this construction. Successful in this, they began building the roads which began to connect Spanish communities of Mexico. After several years, he promoted the building of a highway to connect the silver mining city of Zacatecas with Mexico City. The discovery of silver in Mexico in the 1540s was a major event in the economic consolidation of the colony. Aparicio established the transport system which sent agricultural products to Spain and brought necessary items to the residents of New Spain.

Aparicio prospered, becoming a wealthy man, but he decided to sell his transport business in 1552. He then bought an expanse of land (hacienda de labor) near Zacatecas, where he farmed and ranched cattle. He began to teach the native people how to use a plow for their farms. He showed them how to domesticate horses and oxen, introduced by the Spanish and unfamiliar to the indigenous population, and how to build wagons for transporting their goods, as wheels had also previously been unknown. He, however, had never lost his commitment to a life of faith. He followed a very ascetic way of life. His charity extended to all, giving much of his wealth to those in need, and lending money without asking anything in return. Eventually feeling pressured to marry, at the age of 60 he became engaged to a young woman who had no hopes of finding a husband, due to her lack of a dowry. They agreed to practice a white marriage, not consummating the union. Though she was much younger, his wife died a year later. He married again two years after that, with one María Esteban, with the same arrangement, only to lose his second wife by the time he was 70.

=== Friar ===
Shortly after being widowed for the second time, Aparicio grew seriously ill and began to re-assess his life. He began to dress very simply and to spend long hours in church. Feeling a call to enter the consecrated life, he frequently visited the Franciscan friars in Tlalnepantla. Added to his own doubts were those of a number of the friars as to his ability to follow their life. Finally his confessor made a suggestion: Aparicio would donate his fortune to the first Monastery of Poor Clares in Mexico, founded a few years earlier, and would live as a volunteer on the grounds, serving the external needs of the nuns. He accepted this suggestion, and signed a deed to this effect on 20 December 1573.

The following year, despite considerable advice against this from his friends, given his advanced age, Aparicio finally decided to apply to the friars to be admitted as a lay brother. After a year of following the routine of service and prayer followed by nuns, the superiors of the friars decided to accept him, and he received the religious habit of a friar on 9 June 1574, aged 72, at the novitiate of the Order in Mexico City. During the following year of probation, he experienced continued trials, both with the difference in age between himself and his classmates, and in what he experienced as demonic attacks upon his resolve. These ended with his profession of religious vows on 13 June 1575. As he was still illiterate, his document of commitment had to be signed by a fellow friar, Alfonso Peinado.

After this, Aparicio was assigned to serve at the friary in Santiago, Tecali, near Puebla. He felt a blessing in this location, dedicated as it is to St. James the Great, the patron saint of his native Galicia, to whom he prayed constantly throughout his life. At the friary, over the course of the following year, he held a number of offices: cook, sacristan, gardener and porter. He was then assigned to the large community of friars in the city of Puebla, at that time consisting of about 100 friars, most of whom were doing their studies or were retired or recovering from illness. He was appointed to be the quaestor of the community, the one assigned to travel throughout the local community, seeking food and alms for the upkeep of the friars and those who came to them for help. The builder of Mexico's highway system had become a beggar on it. Despite his advanced age, he felt the vigor needed for the task.

Aparicio was given an oxcart with two oxen to travel through the city and the surrounding villages. He lived on the road for days, sleeping on the ground under the cart in bad weather. He would spend his time meditating on the Passion and on the teachings and example of St. Francis of Assisi. He would hold a rosary in one hand and the reins in the other. He soon became a familiar sight throughout Mexico, known for his cry, Guárdeos Dios, hermanos, ¿hay qué dar, por Dios, a San Francisco? (May God keep you, brothers. Do you have anything to give, for the love of God, to St. Francis?) He spent the last 26 years of his life in this way. He was seen to be a model friar and people declared that wherever Friar Sebastian went, "the angels accompanied him". From his many years of handling them, even animals followed his orders. Just by his slightest command, horses, oxen and mules would obey his words. The integrity of his life spoke of simplicity and of Christ to the people of the region.

Aparicio's level of health, even at the end of his life, was attested to in an incident which occurred while he was on the road. One time, as he was returning to the friary with the cart filled with donations, a wheel started to come off. The friar dismounted and unhooked the oxen from the cart. He then lifted it himself, while he repaired the wheel. The laborer who saw this swore that it would normally have taken four men to lift that cart. He was aged 95 at the time of the incident.

== Death ==
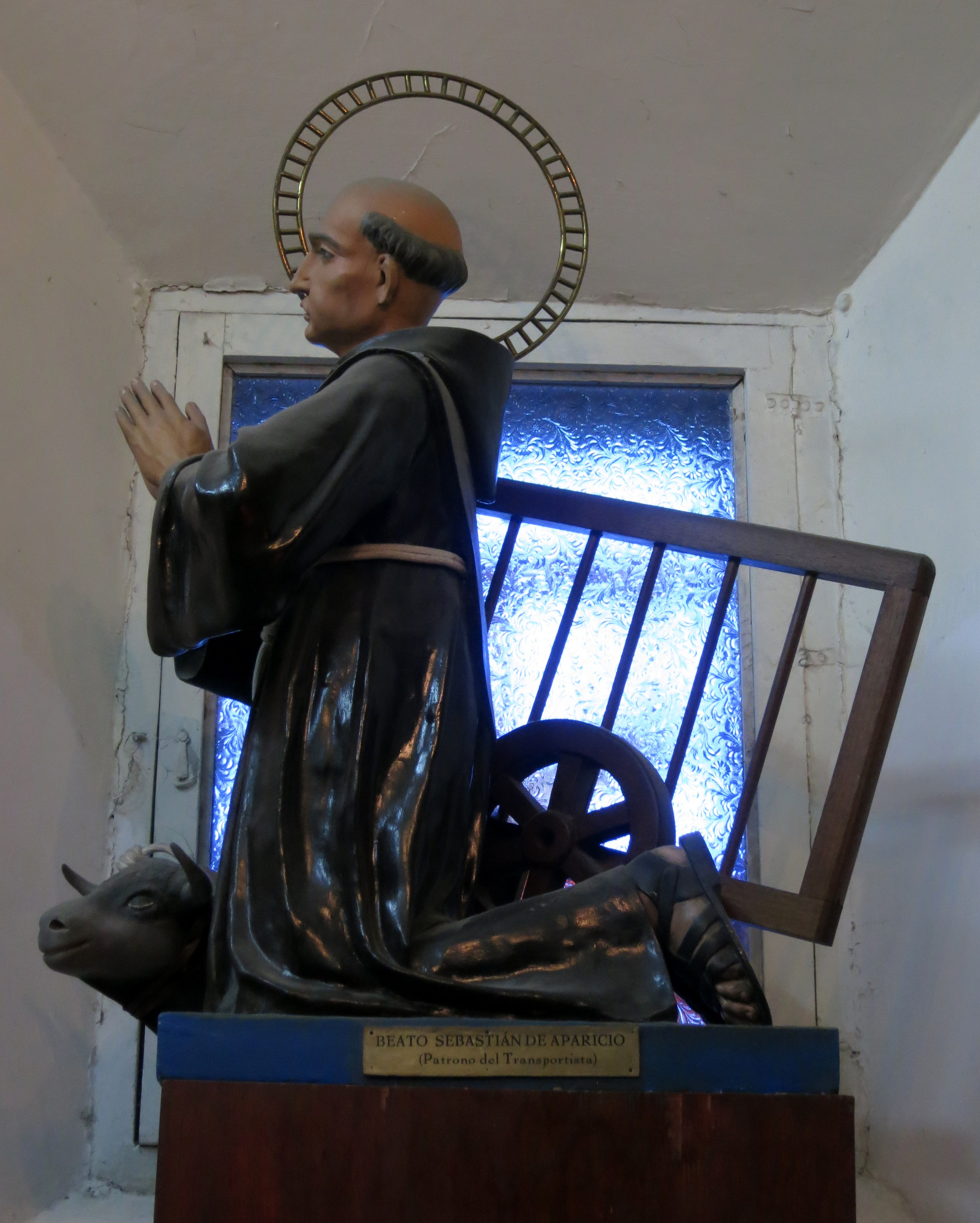
Statue of Sebastian de Aparicio in Basílica de Nuestra Señora de Zapopan.

Though he had long suffered from a hernia, Aparicio marked his 98th birthday on the road, apparently in good health. On the following 20 February, he developed what was to be his final illness, as the hernia became entangled. He began to feel pain and nausea, and, upon arrival at the friary, was immediately sent to the infirmary. It was the first time he had slept in a bed in 25 years. As his condition worsened, he became unable to swallow. His only regret was that, due to this, he was unable to receive Holy Communion. As he lay dying, he was consoled by the friars' fulfilling his request that they bring the Blessed Sacrament to his cell.

On the evening of 25 February, Aparicio asked to be laid on the ground to meet his death, in imitation of St. Francis. He soon died in the arms of a fellow Galician, Friar Juan de San Buenaventura, with his last word being "Jesus". When his body lay in state, the crowds that gathered were large, and the miracles wrought were so numerous, that he could not be buried for several days. His habit had to be replaced repeatedly, as mourners would snip a piece of it off to keep as the relic of a saint.

When authorities exhumed Aparicio's body six months later, they found that it had not decomposed. Two years later when they exhumed his body again, it still remained incorrupt. After an investigation by the Roman Catholic Archdiocese of Mexico City, in which nearly 1,000 miracles at his intercession were reported, Pope Pius VI beatified him in 1789 and today his incorrupt body can be seen at the Church of San Francisco in Puebla.

Blessed Sebastian of Aparicio is the Patron Saint of travelers.
