= Limiana =

Breed of cattle

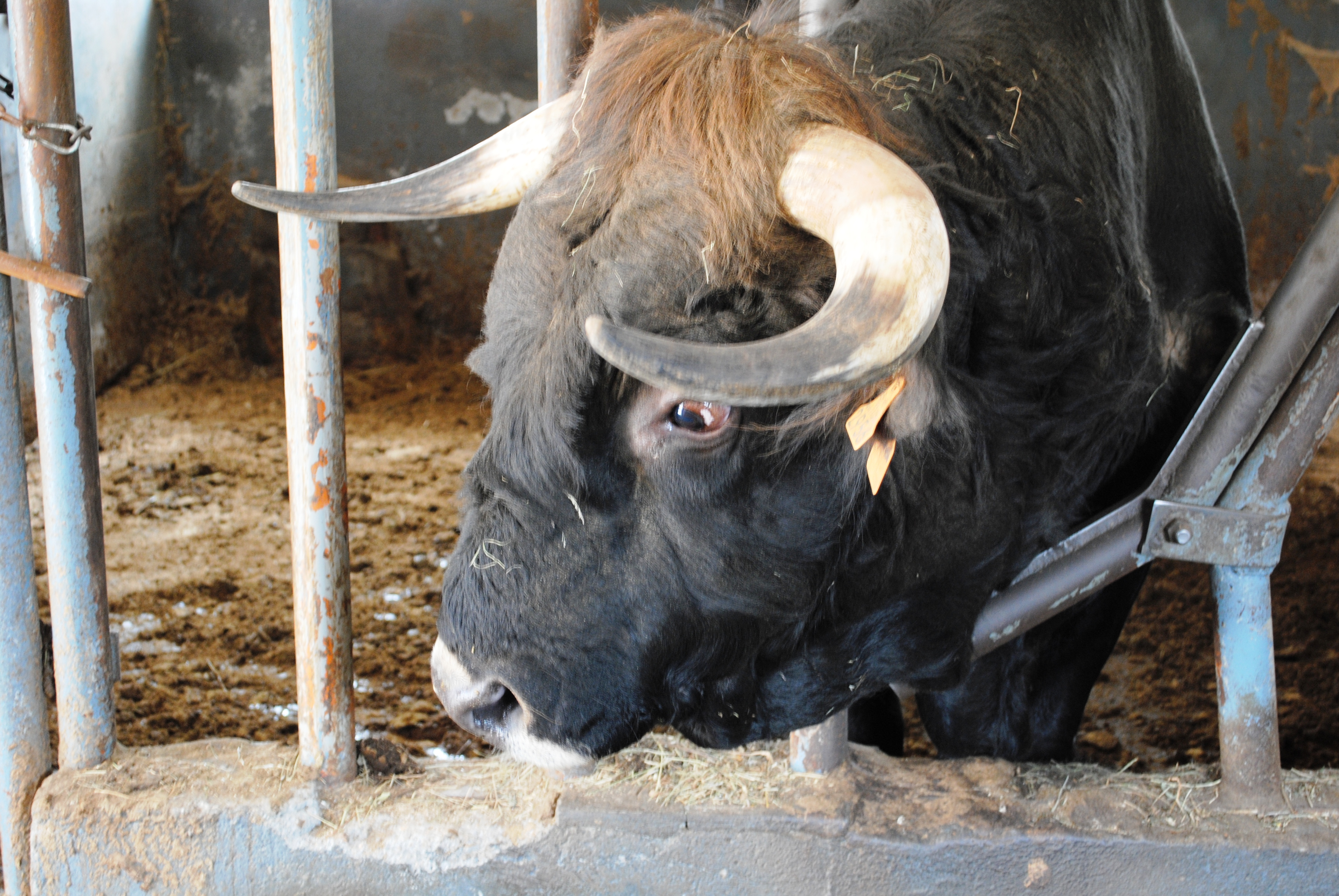
- Conservation status: FAO (2007): critical-maintained; DAD-IS (2025): at risk/endangered-maintained
- Other names: Limiá
- Country of origin: Spain
- Distribution: Galicia

Traits
- Weight: Male: Average: 900 kg; Female: Average: 490 kg
- Height: Male: Average: 143 cm; Range: 135–160 cm; Female: Average: 137 cm; Range: 133–155 cm
- Coat: chestnut, darker on the extremities and forward third of the body
- Horn status: horned
- Cattle; Bos (primigenius) taurus

The Limiana or Raza Limiá is a Spanish breed of domestic cattle. It is named for the comarca of A Limia, in the southern part of the Province of Ourense, in Galicia in north-west Spain. It is the largest of the cattle breeds of Galicia.

It is one of the five Galician breeds that together make up the Morena Gallega grouping of chestnut-coloured cattle, the others being the Cachena, the Caldelana, the Frieiresa and the Vianesa, which with the Alistana-Sanabresa and the Sayaguesa of Castile and León and the extinct Verinesa also form the broader Morenas del Noroeste grouping of similar cattle breeds.

== History ==
The total population reported for 1994 was 60 animals, 46 breeding cows and 14 bulls. At the end of 2023 the total population numbered 1698 head, with 1410 females and 288 males; the breeding stock consisted of 1035 cows and 52 active bulls.

== Characteristics ==
The Limiá is the largest of the cattle breeds of Galicia: heights at the withers are in the range 133 to 155 cm for cows, with an average of 137 cm, and 135 to 160 cm for bulls, with an average of 143 cm; average body weights are about 490 kg and 900 kg respectively. The coat is chestnut-coloured, darker on the forward third of the animal, the lower legs and the tip of the tail; there is a pale ring round the mouth. The eyelids and mucosae are black.

== Use ==
This was in the past a triple-purpose breed, reared for draught work, for milk and for meat. In the twenty-first century it is dual-purpose animal, reared for meat and draught – even if its draught use has been almost entirely abandoned.

In meat production, calves are commonly sold for slaughter as yearlings, at weights of 205 to 270 kg for heifer calves and 295 to 385 kg for bullocks.
