= Borja del Rosario =

Spanish footballer

Personal information
- Full name: Borja Rafael del Rosario Ramos
- Date of birth: 14 January 1985 (age 41)
- Place of birth: Las Palmas, Spain
- Height: 1.82 m (5 ft 11 1/2 in)
- Position: Attacking midfielder

Senior career*
Years	Team	Apps	(Gls)
2002–2005	Las Palmas B		
2003–2005	Las Palmas	2	(0)
2005–2006	Málaga B	28	(1)
2007	Rayo Vallecano B		
2007	Mallorca B		
2007–2008	Tijarafe		
2008–2009	Lemona	12	(0)
2009–2010	Montañeros	4	(0)
2010–2011	Mensajero		
2011	Villa Santa Brígida		
2011–2012	Tijarafe		
2012–2013	Unión Viera		

International career
2001	Spain U17	1	(0)
- * Club domestic league appearances and goals

Borja Rafael del Rosario Ramos (born 14 January 1985) is a Spanish former footballer who played as an attacking midfielder.
