= UD Tijarafe =

Tijarafe
- Full name: Unión Deportiva Tijarafe
- Founded: 1975
- Dissolved: 2018
- Ground: Estadio Municipal, Tijarafe, Canary Islands, Spain
- Capacity: 1,500
- Chairman: (Spain) Francisco David Martín
- Manager: (Spain) Adolfo Pérez
- 2017–18: Interinsular Preferente – Group 2, 7th of 9
Home colours	Away colours

Unión Deportiva Tijarafe was a football team based in Tijarafe, in the Canary Islands. Founded in 1975 and dissolved in 2018, it last played in the Interinsular Preferente – Group 2. Its stadium is Estadio Municipal with a capacity of 1,500 seats.

== Season to season ==
Season	Tier	Division	Place	Copa del Rey
1975–1985	—	Regional	—	
1985–86	7	2ª Terr.	3rd	
1986–87	7	2ª Terr.	5th	
1987–88	7	2ª Terr.	6th	
1988–89	7	2ª Terr.	9th	
1989–90	7	2ª Terr.	7th	
1990–91	7	2ª Terr.	6th	
1991–92	7	2ª Terr.	5th	
1992–93	7	2ª Terr.	6th	
1993–94	7	2ª Terr.	8th	
1994–95	7	2ª Terr.	3rd	
1995–96	7	2ª Terr.	5th	
1996–97	7	2ª Terr.	5th	
1997–98	7	2ª Terr.	6th	
1998–99	7	2ª Terr.	6th	
1999–2000	7	2ª Terr.	9th	
2000–01	7	2ª Terr.	4th	

Season	Tier	Division	Place	Copa del Rey
2001–02	7	2ª Terr.	1st	
2002–03	6	1ª Terr.	7th	
2003–04	6	1ª Terr.	2nd	
2004–05	5	Int. Pref.	7th	
2005–06	5	Int. Pref.	1st	
2006–07	4	3ª	7th	
2007–08	4	3ª	14th	
2008–09	4	3ª	14th	
2009–10	4	3ª	11th	
2010–11	4	3ª	10th	
2011–12	4	3ª	17th	
2012–13	4	3ª	18th	
2013–14	5	Int. Pref.	10th	
2014–15	5	Int. Pref.	10th	
2015–16	5	Int. Pref.	6th	
2016–17	5	Int. Pref.	9th	
2017–18	5	Int. Pref.	7th	

- 4 seasons in Tercera División
