= Vilariño de Conso =

- Municipality
- Coat of arms

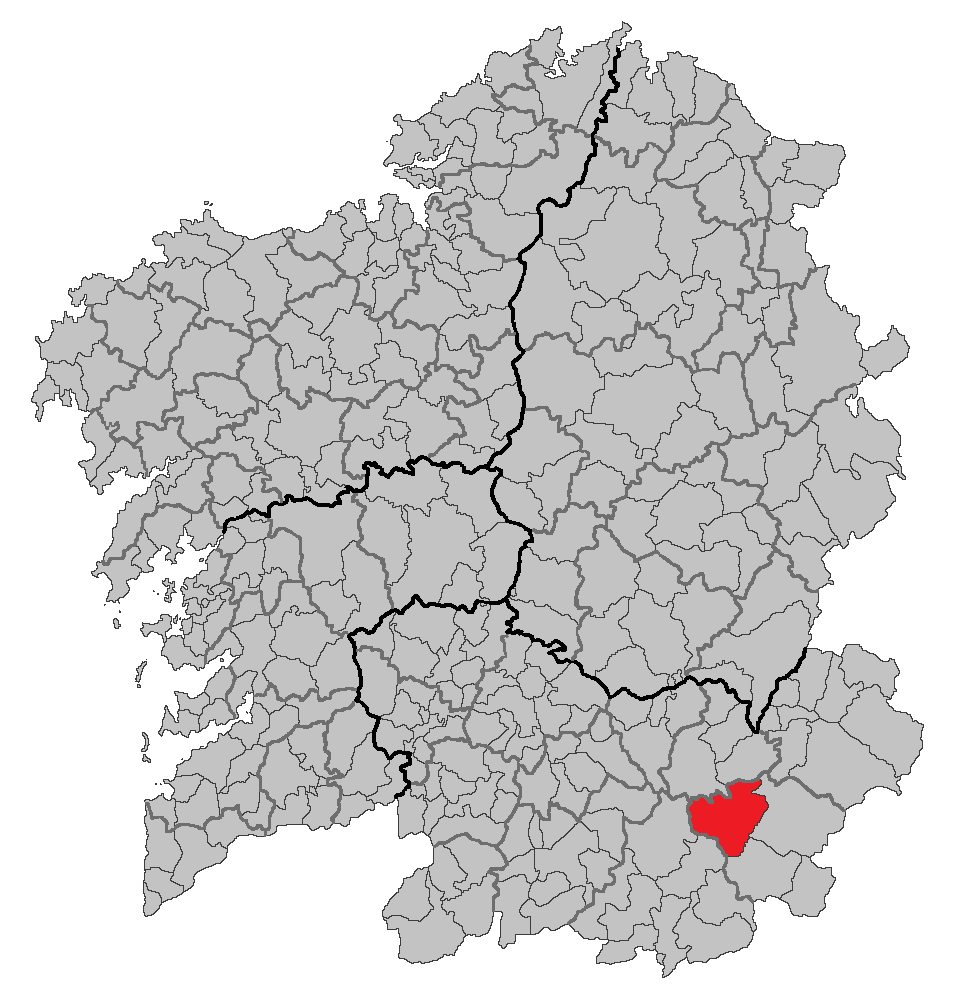
- Location in Galicia

- Location in Spain
- Coordinates: 42°10′37″N 7°10′16″W
- Country: Spain
- Autonomous community: Galicia
- Province: Ourense
- Comarca: Viana

Government
  - Mayor: Ventura Sierra Vázquez (PP)

Area
  - Total: 200.2 km^{2} (77.3 sq mi)
- Elevation: 726 m (2,382 ft)

Population (2025-01-01)
  - Total: 501
  - Density: 2.50/km^{2} (6.48/sq mi)
- Time zone: UTC+1 (CET)
  - Summer (DST): UTC+2 (CEST)
- Website: www.vilarinodeconso.es

Vilariño de Conso is a municipality in the province of Ourense, in the autonomous community of Galicia, Spain. It belongs to the comarca of Viana.
