= Palmera cattle =

Spanish breed of cattle

Palmera
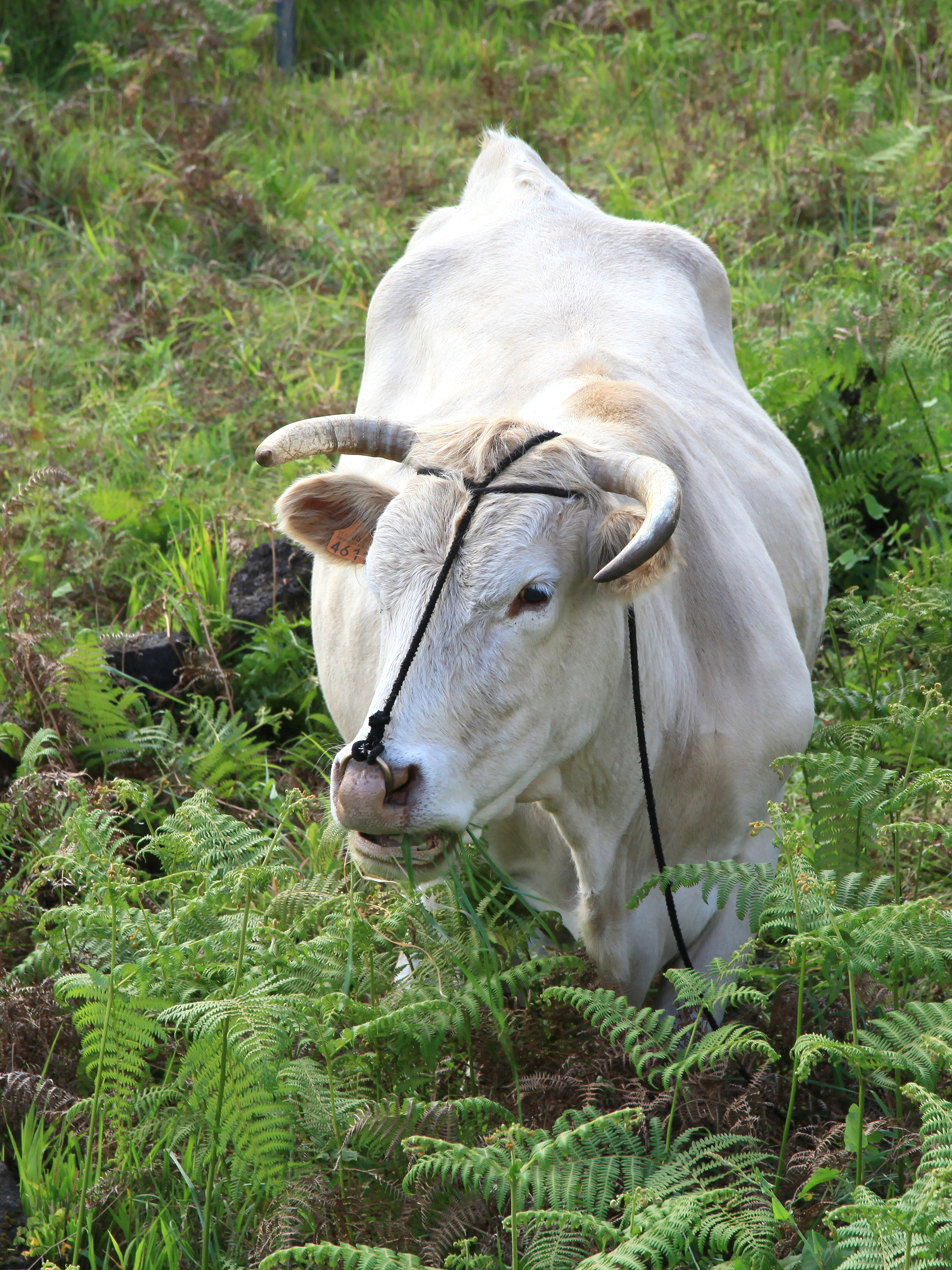
- Near Breña Alta, La Palma, Canary Islands
- Conservation status: FAO (2007): endangered-maintained
- Country of origin: Spain
- Distribution: La Palma, Canary Islands
- Standard: Consejería de Agricultura, Ganadería, Pesca y Aguas (in Spanish)
- Use: Formerly: triple-purpose, meat, milk and draught; Now: mainly meat

Traits
- Weight: Male: 600 kg; Female: 400 kg
- Height: Male: 126 cm; Female: 118 cm
- Coat: from creamy white to soft red
- Horn status: horned
- Cattle; Bos (primigenius) taurus

The Palmera is an endangered Spanish breed of cattle from the island of San Miguel de La Palma, in the autonomous community of the Canary Islands. The cattle are not indigenous to the island, but were brought by European settlers in the fifteenth century. The Palmera derives from the Rubia Gallega breed of Galicia. It is distributed mostly in the municipalities of Breña Alta, Breña Baja, El Paso, Garafía, Los Llanos de Aridane and Villa de Mazo, with small numbers in the municipalities of Puntagorda, Santa Cruz de La Palma and Tijarafe; a few may be found on the islands of Fuerteventura and Tenerife.

== History ==
The Palmera was brought to La Palma by European settlers in the fifteenth century. It is thought to derive from the Rubia Gallega breed of Galicia, in north-western Spain. It is a triple-purpose breed, well adapted to the mountainous conditions of the island. Following the mechanisation of agriculture in the second half of the twentieth century, demand for draught animals fell sharply; there was also competition from imported beef and dairy stock. In 1991 the population was reported to be 172 head.

The Palmera was classified among the breeds "at risk of extinction" by the Ministerio de Agricultura, Alimentación y Medio Ambiente, the Spanish ministry of agriculture, on 7 November 1997. A breeders' association, the Asociación Nacional de Criadores de Ganado Vacuno de Raza Palmera, was formed in 1999, and the Palmera breed received official recognition on 13 August 2001. At the end of 2014 the total population was recorded as 596, of which 417 were female and 179 male; the breeding stock consisted of 270 cows and 36 active bulls. By the end of 2025 the total number had fallen to 334, with 143 breeding cows and 23 bulls in service. A continuing threat to the survival of the breed is the progressive depopulation of rural areas and the movement, particularly of young people, to urban areas.

== Use and management ==
The Palmera is traditionally a triple-purpose breed, used as a draught animal and for milk and meat production; in the twenty-first century it is raised mainly for beef. Many are kept as show animals, either to be shown at agricultural fairs or to participate in the traditional rural sport of arrastre de piedra ('stone-dragging').
