= A Mezquita =

- Municipality
- Flag Coat of arms

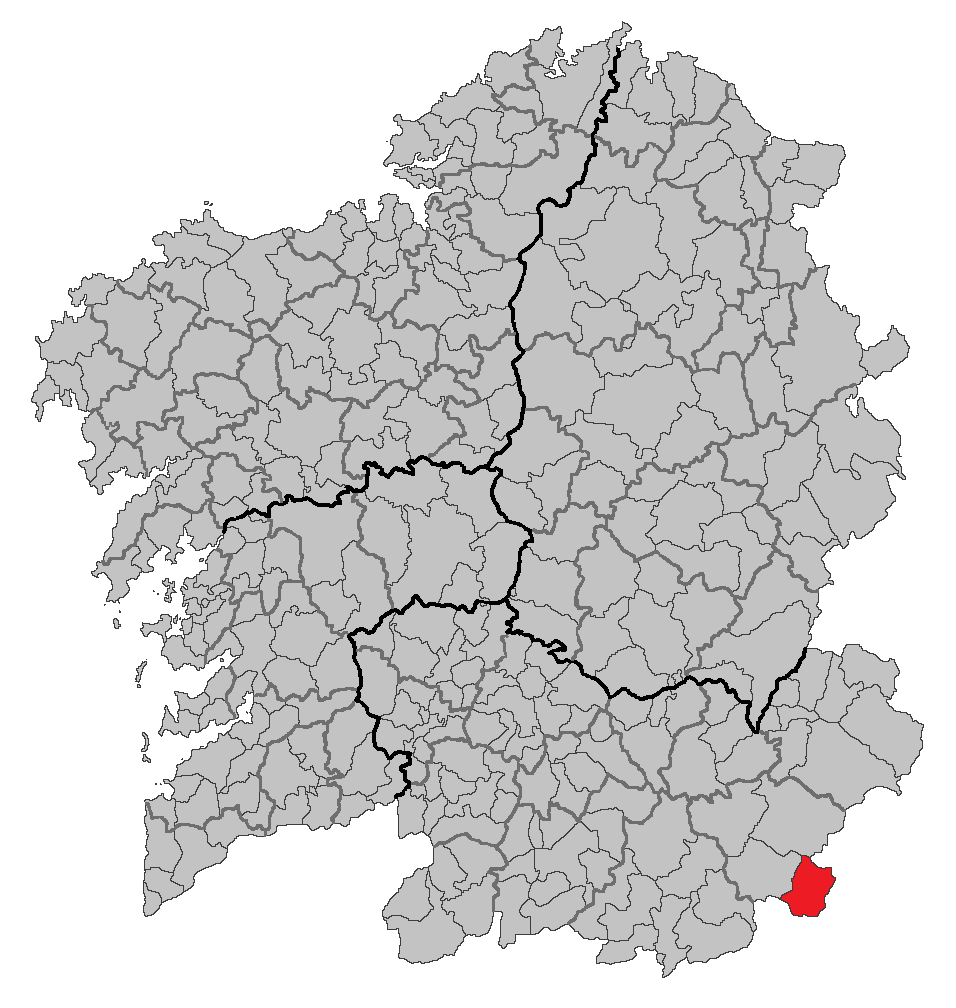
- Location in Galicia

- Location in Spain
- Coordinates: 42°00′41″N 7°02′43″W
- Country: Spain
- Autonomous community: Galicia
- Province: Ourense
- Comarca: Viana

Government
  - Mayor: Rafael Pérez Vázquez (BNG)

Area
  - Total: 104.3 km^{2} (40.3 sq mi)
- Elevation: 984 m (3,228 ft)

Population (2025-01-01)
  - Total: 996
  - Density: 9.55/km^{2} (24.7/sq mi)
- Time zone: UTC+1 (CET)
  - Summer (DST): UTC+2 (CEST)
- Website: www.amezquita.es

A Mezquita is the southeasternmost municipality in the province of Ourense, in the autonomous community of Galicia, Spain. It belongs to the comarca of Viana.
