= Statue of Sebastian de Aparicio =

Statue in Puebla, Mexico

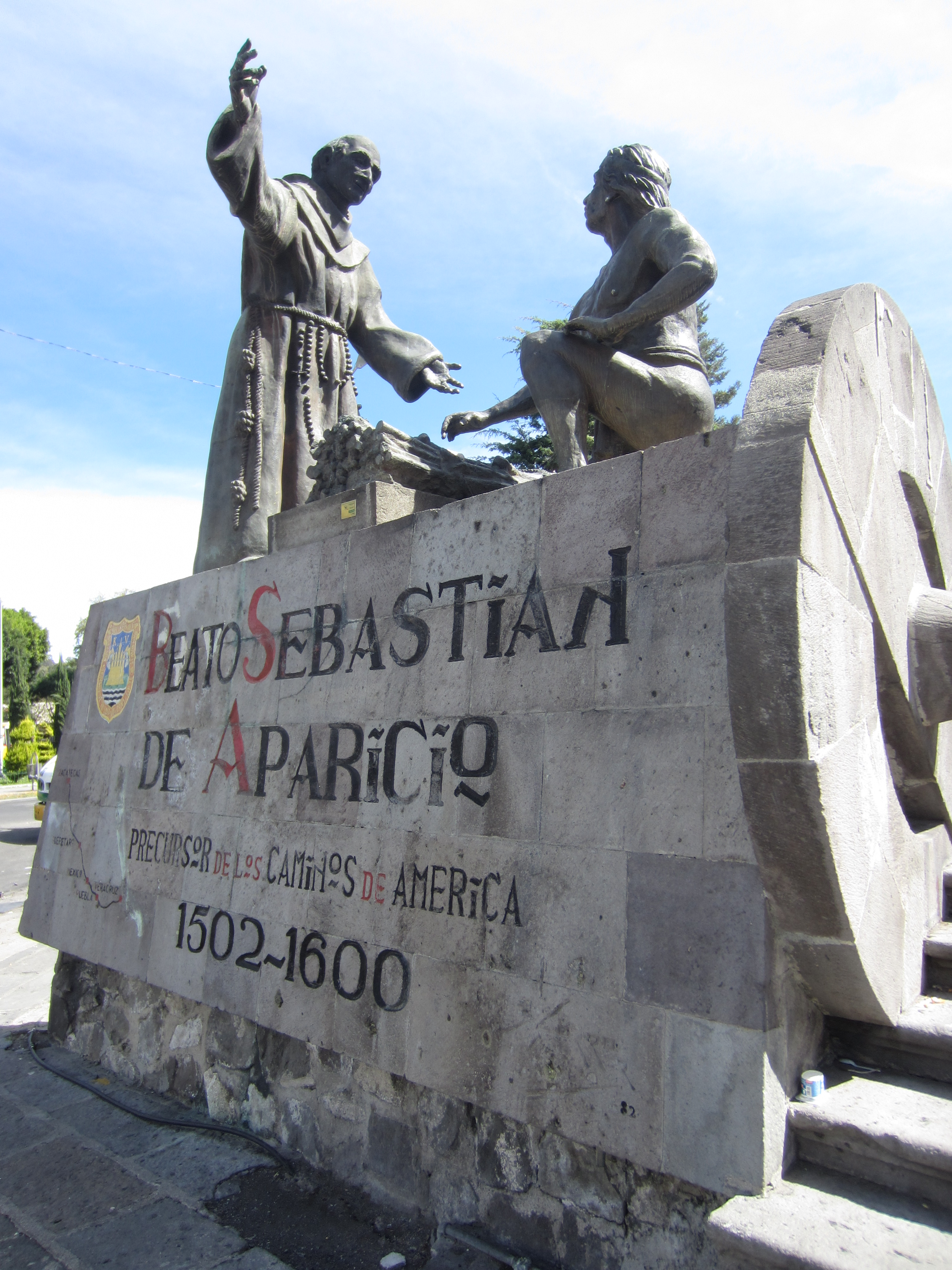
- The statue in 2018
- Subject: Sebastian de Aparicio
- Location: Puebla, Puebla, Mexico; 19°2′42.7″N 98°11′25.3″W

The statue of Sebastian de Aparicio (Blessed Sebastian de Aparicio) is installed outside Puebla's Convent Church of San Francisco, in the Mexican state of Puebla.
