= A Gudiña =

- Municipality
- Coat of arms

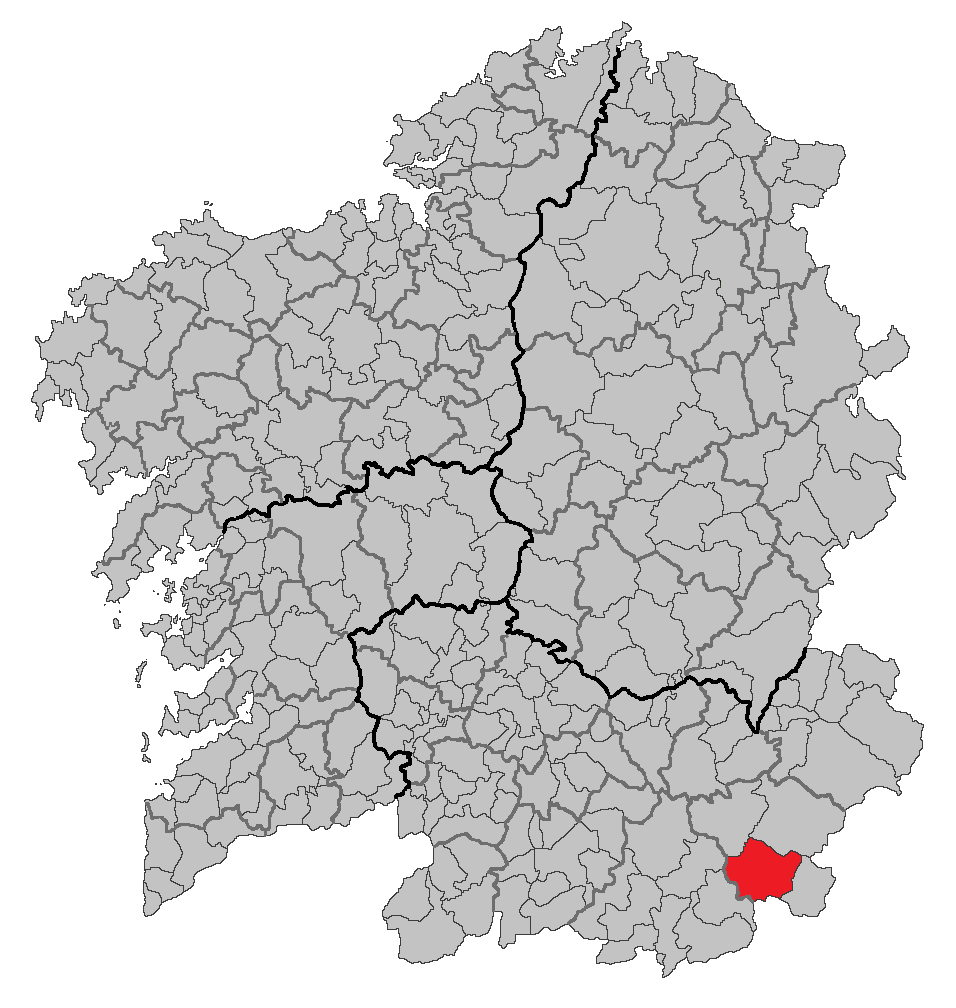
- Location in Galicia

- Location in Spain
- Coordinates: 42°03′39″N 7°08′17″W
- Country: Spain
- Autonomous community: Galicia
- Province: Ourense
- Comarca: Viana

Government
  - Mayor: Guillermo Lago Pérez (People's Party of Galicia)

Area
  - Total: 171.4 km^{2} (66.2 sq mi)
- Elevation: 974 m (3,196 ft)

Population (2025-01-01)
  - Total: 1,197
  - Density: 6.984/km^{2} (18.09/sq mi)
- Time zone: UTC+1 (CET)
  - Summer (DST): UTC+2 (CEST)
- Postal Code: 32540
- INE municipality code: 32034
- Website: agudina.com

A Gudiña (Galician pronunciation: [ɐ ɣuˈðiɲɐ]) is a municipality in the province of Ourense, in the autonomous community of Galicia, Spain. It belongs to the comarca of Viana.
