= Alistana-Sanabresa =

Spanish breed of beef cattle

The Alistana-Sanabresa is a Spanish cattle breed kept as beef cattle. It is named for its origin in Aliste and Sanabria in Castile and León. It is found in farms in Segovia, Burgos, León, Palencia, and Guipúzcoa. It is considered to be in danger of extinction.

An annual fair, the National Morphology contest, is held in Porto de Sanabria to celebrate the breed.

== Morphology and genetics ==
Its coat is colored reddish to chestnut, darker in the middle and with light fur around the eyes. Its horns are medium in size with a white base and black tips. The bulls of the breed weigh approximately 700 kilograms. The breed developed out of an earlier form kept as both draught and beef cattle and has origins in cattle kept in Cantabria. It is closely related to the Portuguese Marinhoa breed.
