= Viana (comarca) =

Coordinates: 42°06′26″N 7°06′59″W

- Comarca
- Flag Coat of arms
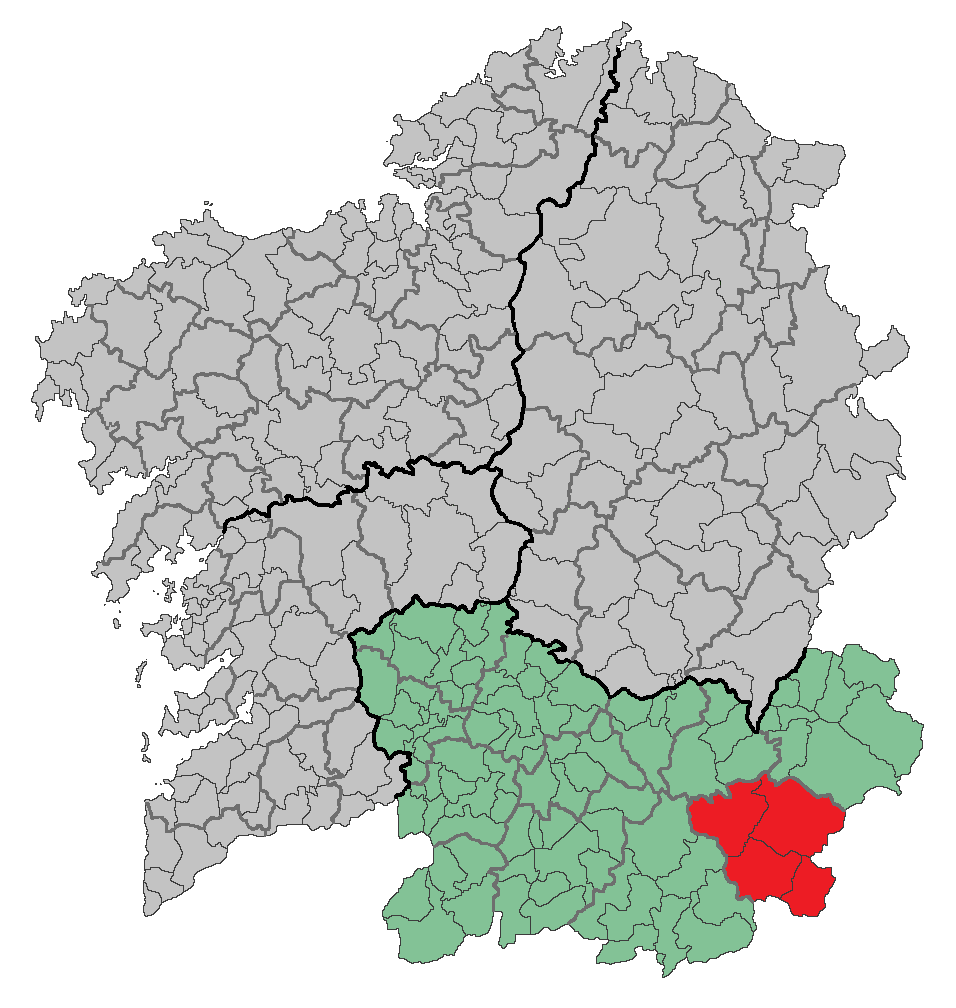
- Country: Spain
- Autonomous community: Galicia
- Province: Ourense
- Capital: Viana do Bolo
- Municipalities: List: A Gudiña, A Mezquita, Viana do Bolo, Vilariño de Conso

Area
  - Total: 746.32 km^{2} (288.16 sq mi)

Population (2019)
  - Total: 5,682
  - Density: 7.613/km^{2} (19.72/sq mi)
- Time zone: UTC+1 (CET)
  - Summer (DST): UTC+2 (CEST)

Viana is a comarca in the Galician Province of Ourense. The overall population of this local region was 5,682 in 2019.

== Municipalities ==
A Gudiña, A Mezquita, Viana do Bolo and Vilariño de Conso.
