= Bruna dels Pirineus =

Breed of cattle

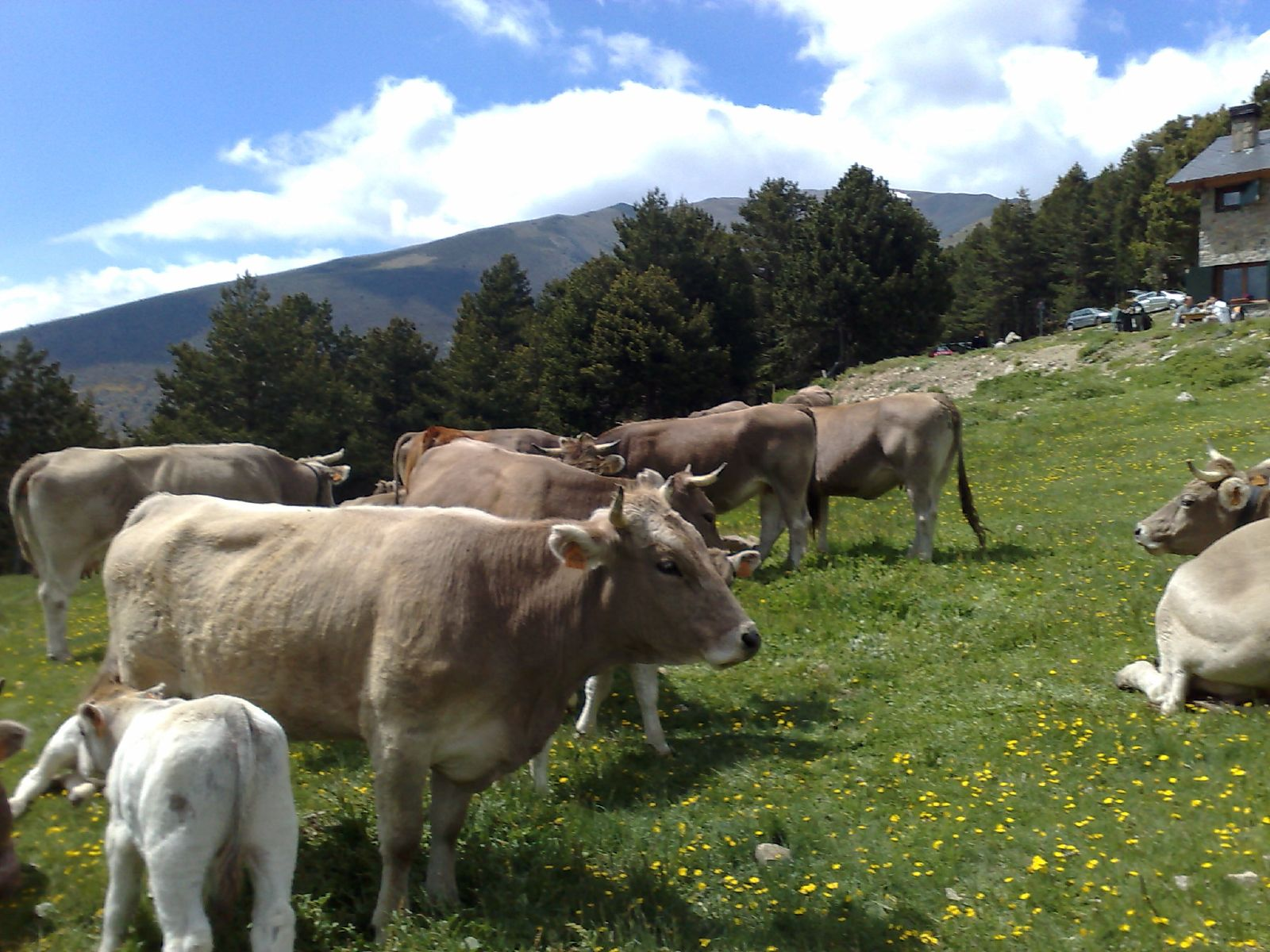
- Cows in the comarca of Ripollès
- Conservation status: FAO (2007): not at risk; DAD-IS (2024): not at risk
- Other names: Spanish: Bruna de los Pirineos
- Country of origin: Spain
- Distribution: northern Catalonia
- Standard: Departament d'Agricultura, Ramadería i Pesca (in Spanish)
- Use: Formerly: triple-purpose, meat, milk and draught; Now: mainly meat

Traits
- Weight: Male: 1050 kg; Female: 600 kg
- Height: Male: 142 cm; Female: 140 cm
- Coat: greyish-brown
- Horn status: horned
- Cattle; Bos (primigenius) taurus

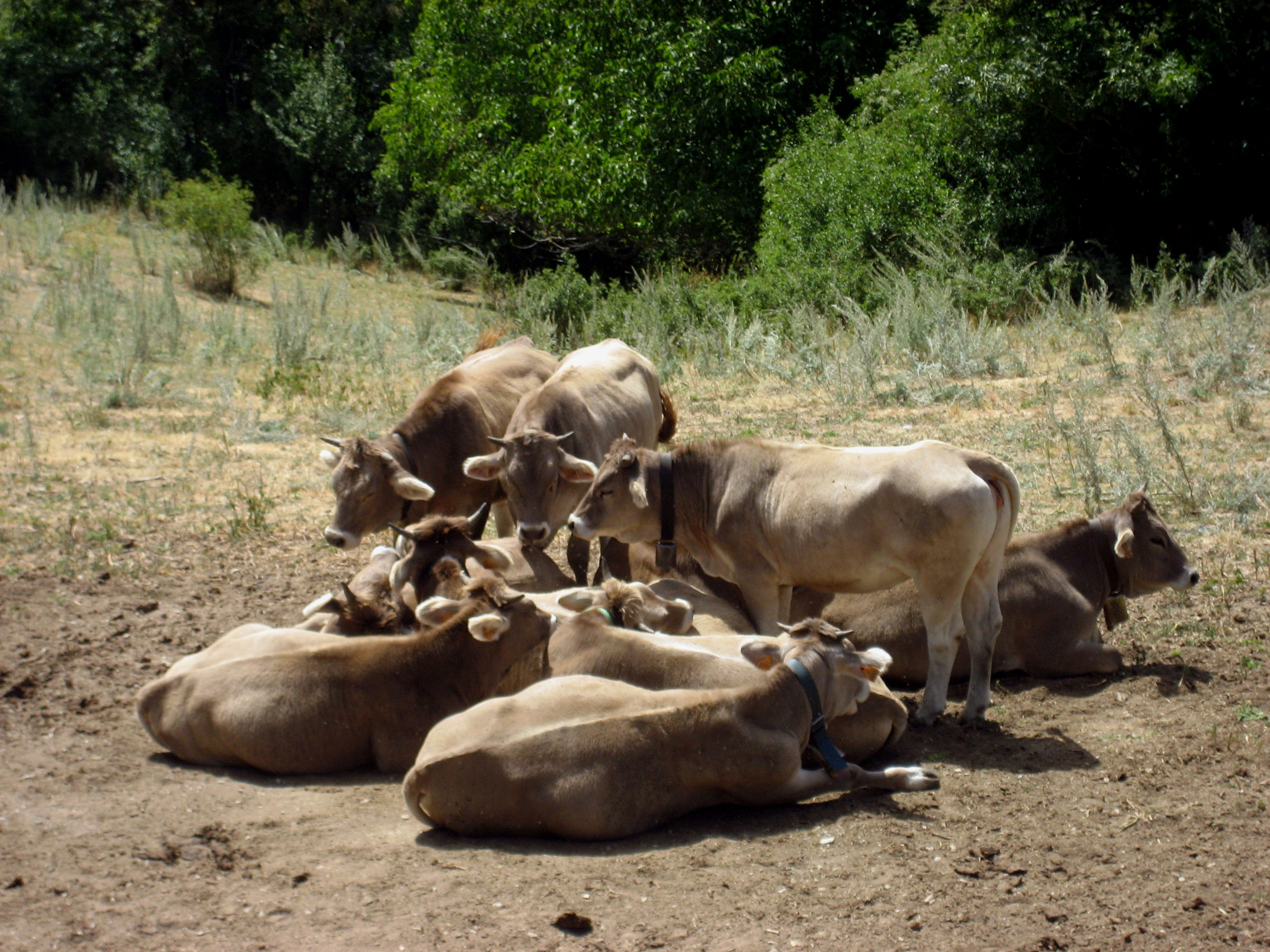
Cows near Bescaran in the comarca of Baixa Cerdanya

The Bruna dels Pirineus, Spanish: Bruna de los Pirineos, is a Spanish breed of cattle from the south-eastern Pyrenees, in the northern part of Catalonia. It derives from cross-breeding of local cattle with Swiss Braunvieh stock imported in the nineteenth century through France and through the Val d'Aran. It is distributed throughout the northern comarcas of Catalonia, Alta Ribagorça, Alt Urgell, Berguedà, Cerdanya, Pallars Jussà, Pallars Sobirà, Ripollès, Solsonès and Val d'Aran. The Bruna dels Pirineus constitutes about 80% of the beef herd of Catalonia.

== History ==
The Bruna dels Pirineus derives from cross-breeding of local cattle of the Catalana (now extinct), the Pallaresa and the Pirenaica breeds with Swiss Braunvieh stock imported in the nineteenth century through France and through the Val d'Aran. The first written documentation of these importations is from 1922, but there is evidence going back to 1880 of imports to help satisfy the demand for milk for butter manufacture in Cerdanya.

In the 1970s specialised meat breeds, Charolais and Limousin, were imported to Catalonia, but did not adapt successfully to the mountain environment. From the 1980s breeding of the Bruna dels Pirineus, which is well adapted to that environment, began to be oriented more towards meat production. A number of local breeders' associations were formed; a federation of these breeders' associations, the Federació Catalana de la Raça Bruna dels Pirineus, was formed in 1990. In the same year a breed standard was approved and a herd book was established by the Generalitat de Catalunya. The Bruna dels Pirineus breed received official national recognition on 7 November 1997, when it was classified among the breeds "at risk of extinction" by the Ministerio de Agricultura, Alimentación y Medio Ambiente, the Spanish ministry of agriculture.

At the end of 2014 the total population was recorded as 13542, of which 12421 were female and 1121 male.

== Use and management ==
The Bruna dels Pirineus, like the Braunvieh, was initially a triple-purpose breed, used as a draught animal and for milk and meat production. It later became dual-purpose, for meat and dairy use, and then became predominantly a meat breed. It constitutes about 80% of the beef herd of Catalonia.

Management is generally extensive, with transhumance from the valleys to higher mountain pasture in the summer months.
