= Viana do Bolo =

- Municipality
- Flag Coat of arms

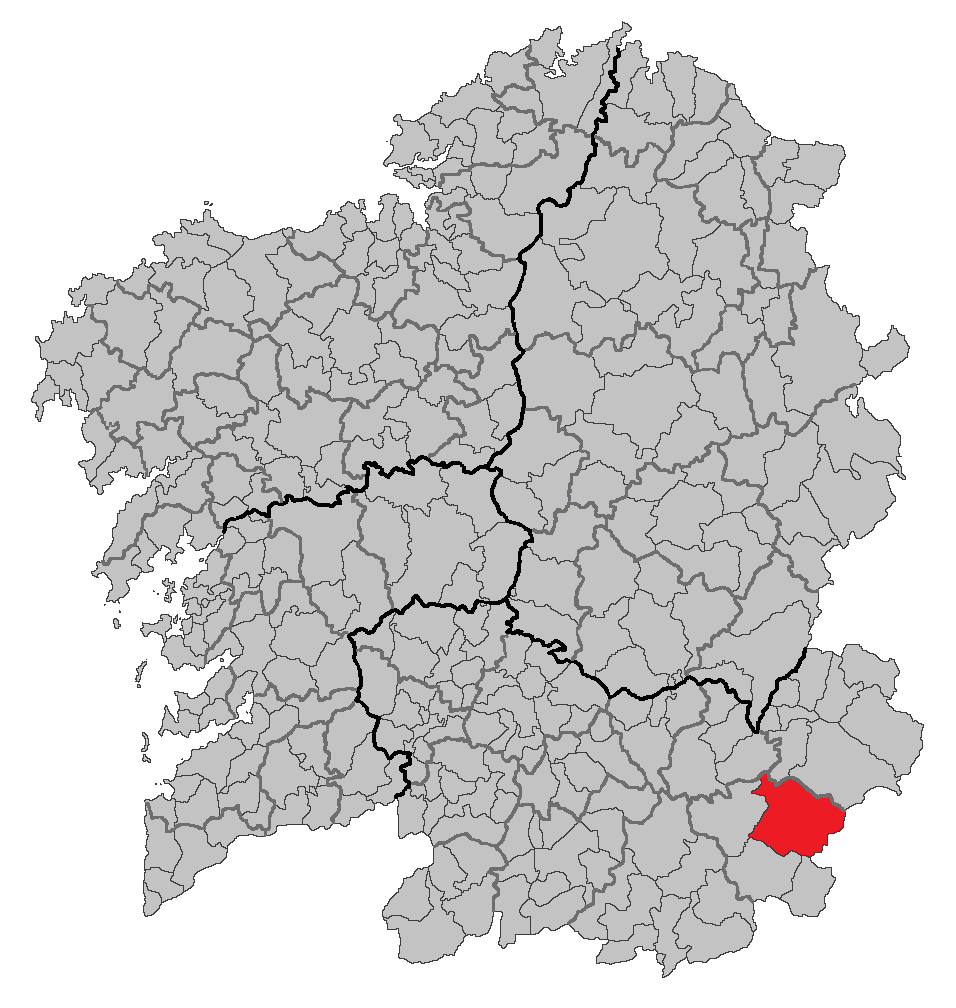
- Location in Galicia

- Location in Spain
- Coordinates: 42°10′46″N 7°06′40″W
- Country: Spain
- Autonomous community: Galicia
- Province: Ourense
- Comarca: Viana

Government
  - Mayor: Secundino Fernández Fernández (BNG)

Area
  - Total: 270.4 km^{2} (104.4 sq mi)
- Elevation: 701 m (2,300 ft)

Population (2025-01-01)
  - Total: 2,715
  - Density: 10.04/km^{2} (26.01/sq mi)
- Time zone: UTC+1 (CET)
  - Summer (DST): UTC+2 (CEST)
- Website: vianadobolo.gal/

Viana do Bolo is a municipality in the province of Ourense, in the autonomous community of Galicia, Spain. It belongs to the comarca of Viana.

The Entrudio (carnival) of Viana do Bolo is its most famous celebration. It features the character of the boteiro, the fulións from all over the territory and the comparsas, a traditional masquerade that travels through the small villages of the municipality performing humorous plays in verse and playing music.

In 2015 the ‘Mascarada Ibérica’ (‘Festival Internacional Mascarada Ibérica ViBoMask’ since 2020) has been held in Viana do Bolo and Vilariño de Conso. This festival, which acts as a prelude to the local Entrudio (carnival), is usually held in winter and has come to congregate in its last edition more than 45 winter masquerades from various parts of Spain, Portugal and even Italy, with about 700 participants, making it the largest concentration of masquerades in the entire Iberian Peninsula. The festival has been held in Viana do Bolo and Vilariño de Conso since 2015.

== Gallery ==
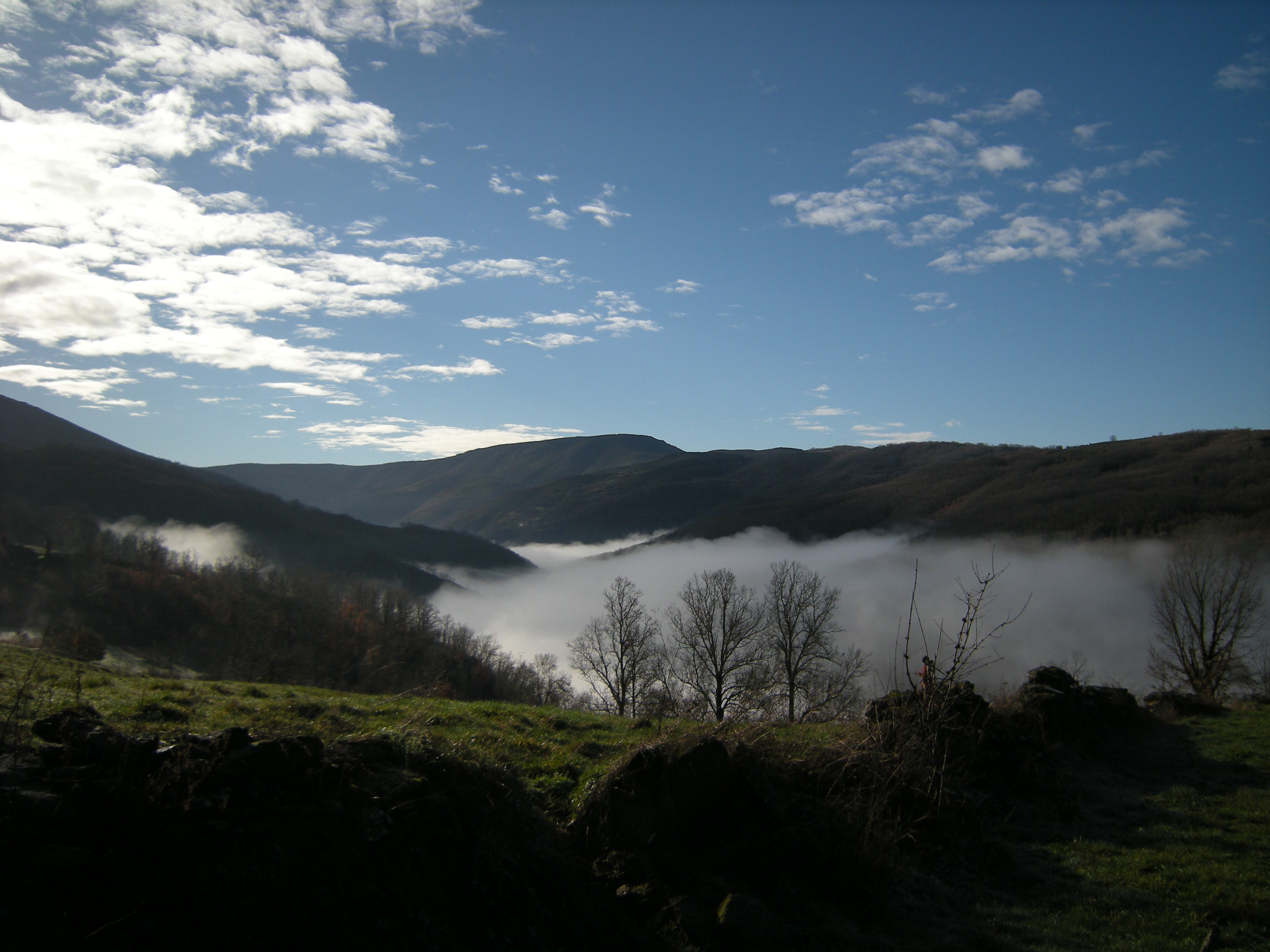

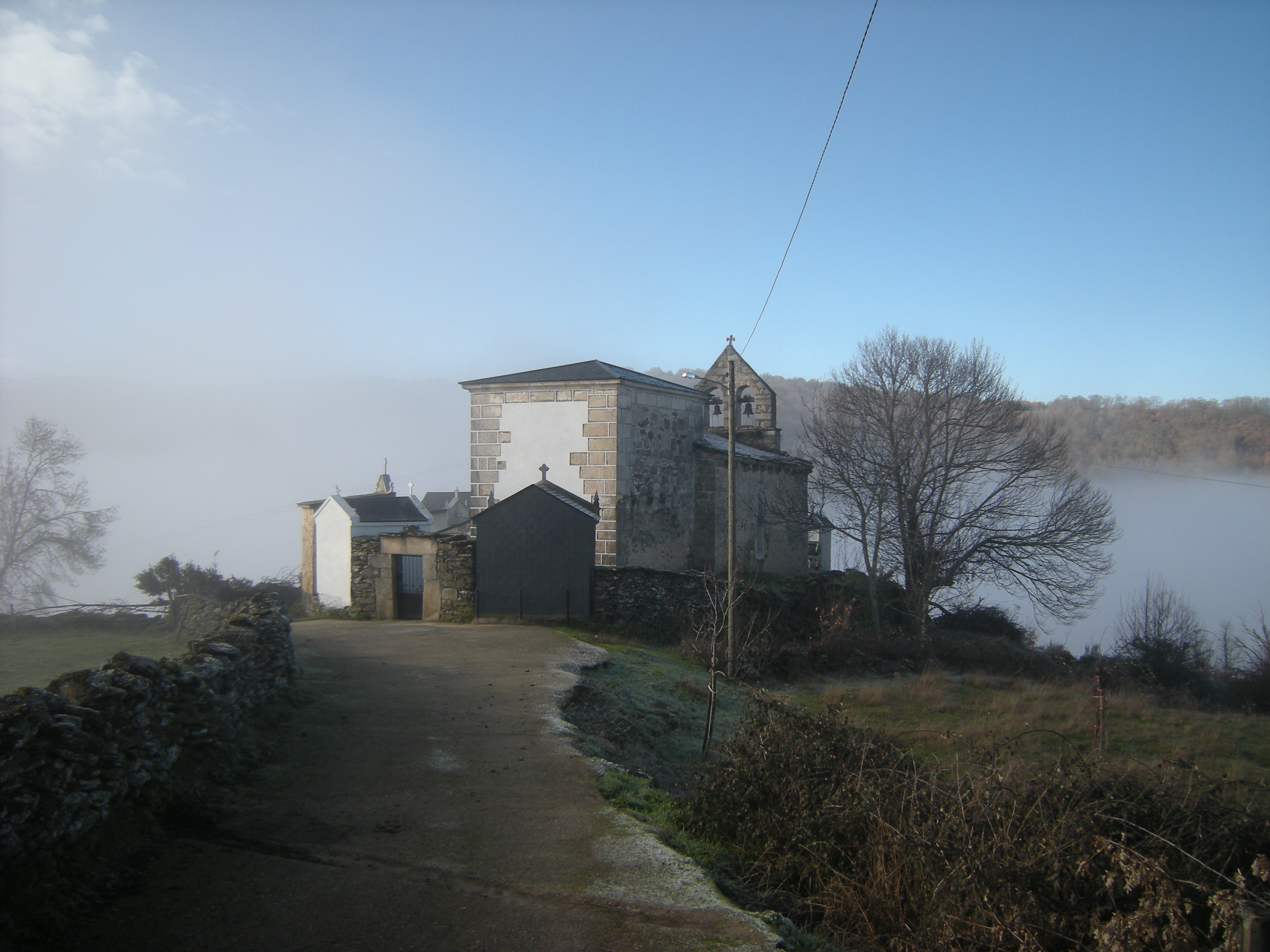

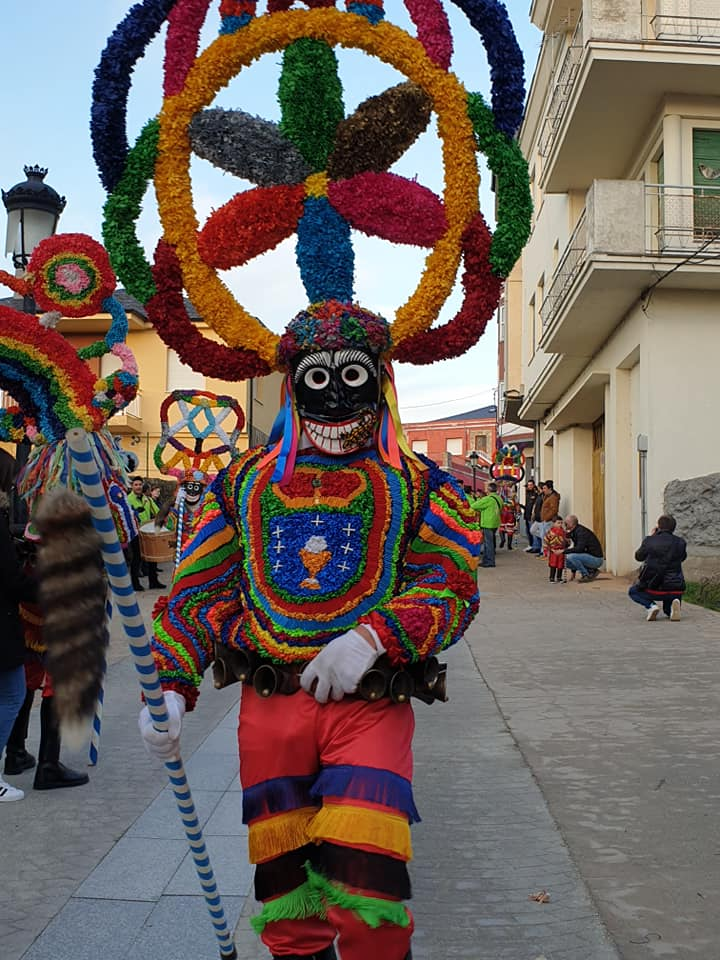
Boteiro

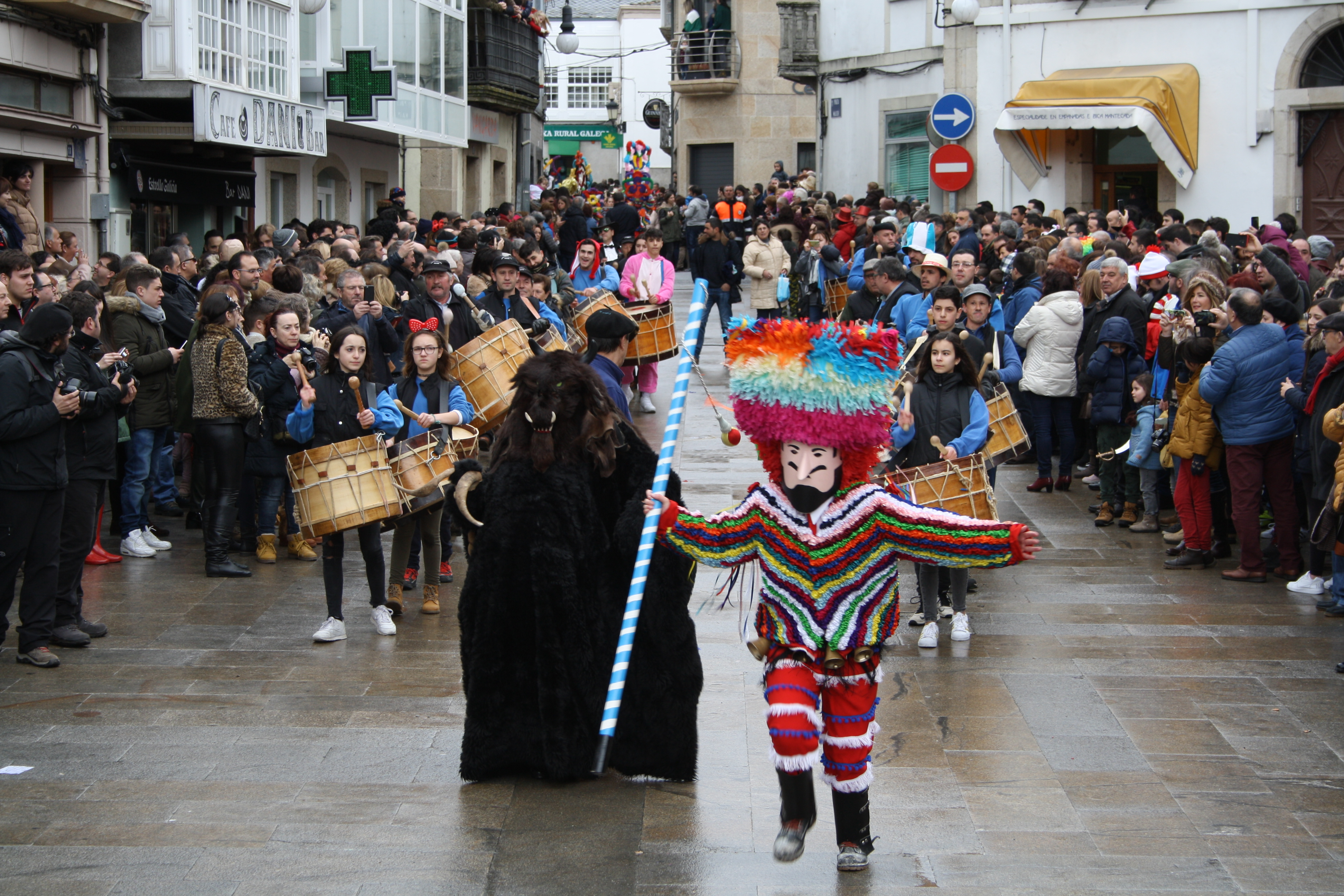
Fulión

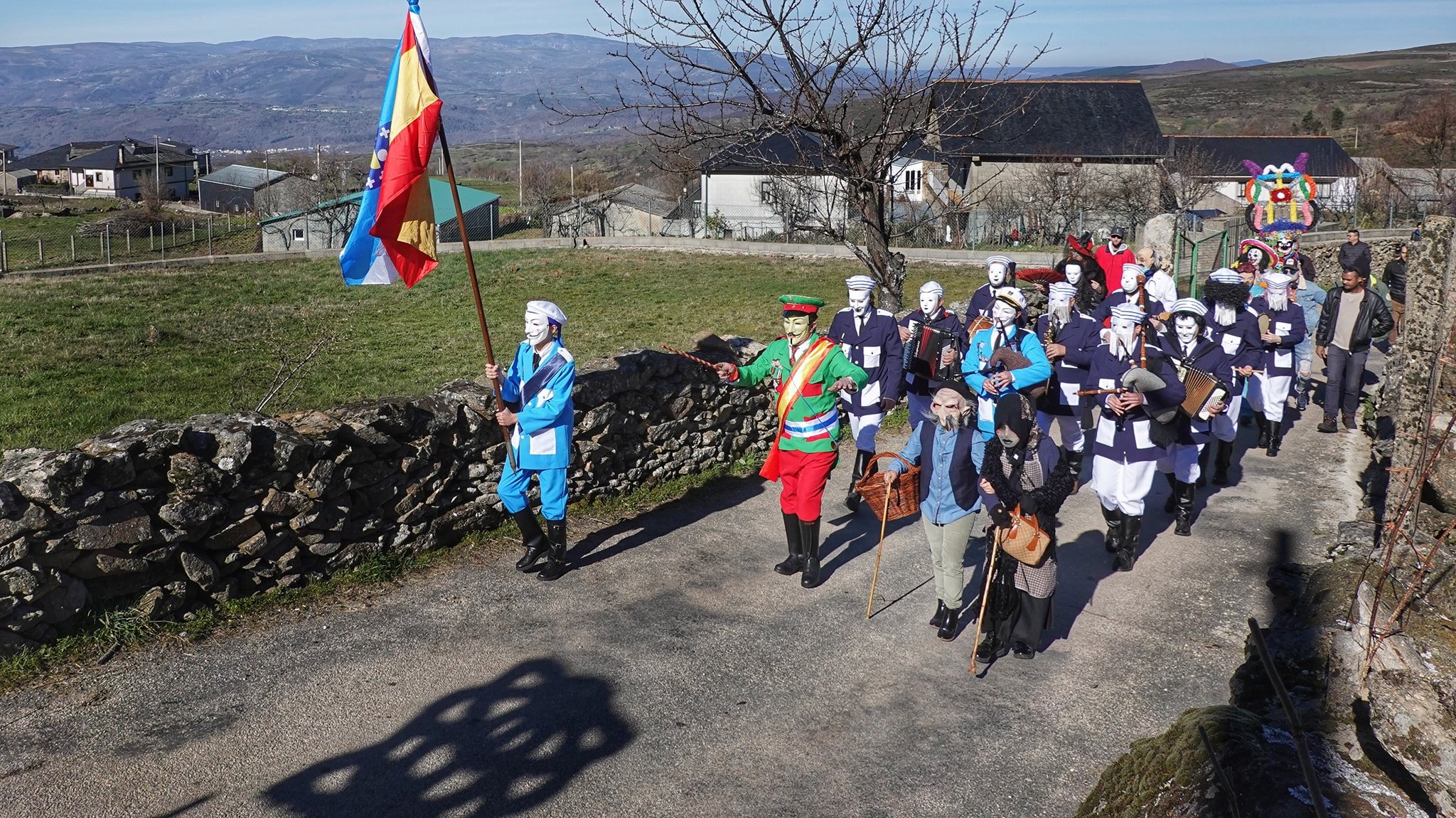
Comparsa
