= Convent Church of San Francisco, Puebla =

Church in Puebla, Mexico

Convent Church of San Francisco
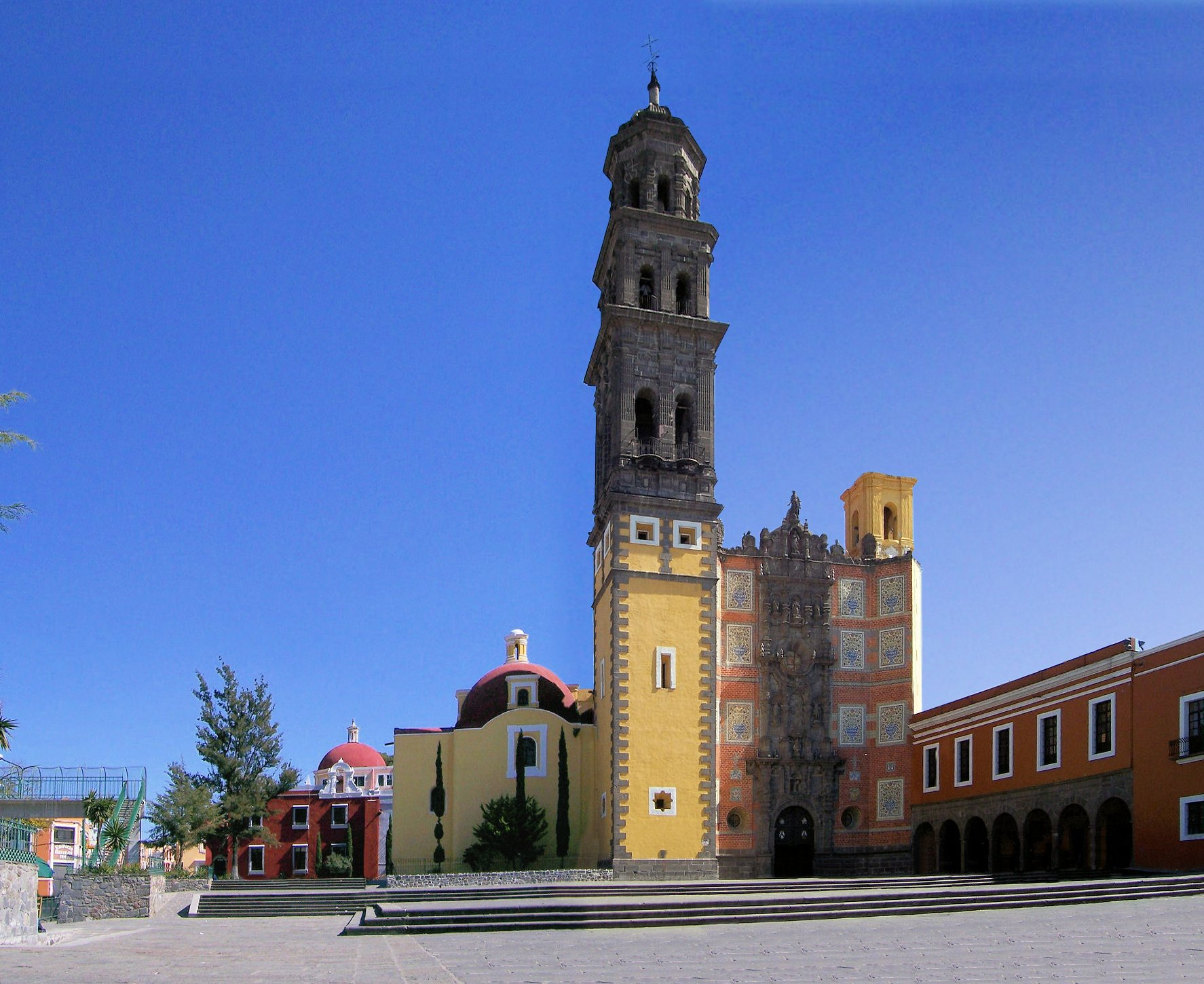
- The church's exterior, 2005

- Location within Mexico

Location
- Interactive map of Convent Church of San Francisco
- Coordinates: 19°2′41″N 98°11′22″W

The Convent Church of San Francisco is an historic church in the city of Puebla, in the Mexican state of Puebla.

== See also ==
- List of buildings in Puebla City
- Statue of Sebastian de Aparicio
