= Tijarafe =

- Municipality
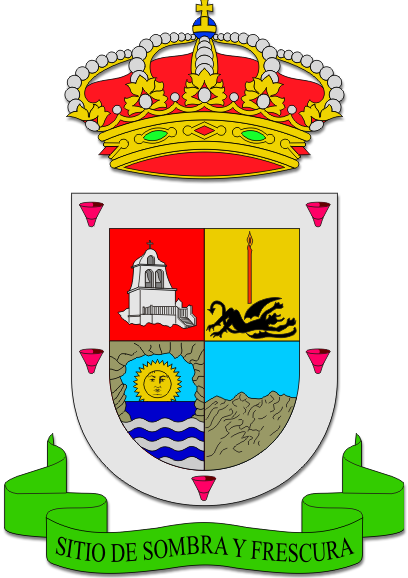
- Flag Coat of arms

- Location in Canary Islands
- Coordinates: 28°42′40″N 17°57′20″W
- Country: Spain
- Autonomous community: Canary Islands
- Province: Santa Cruz de Tenerife
- Island: La Palma

Area
  - Total: 53.76 km^{2} (20.76 sq mi)

Population (2025-01-01)
  - Total: 2,733
  - Density: 50.84/km^{2} (131.7/sq mi)

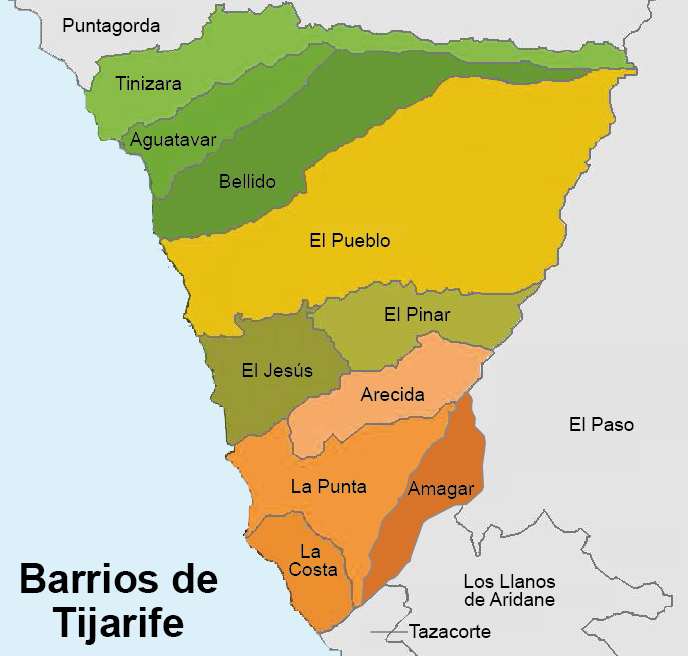

Tijarafe is a town and a municipality on the island of La Palma, Province of Santa Cruz de Tenerife, Canary Islands, Spain. It is situated in the northwestern part of the island. The population of the municipality is 2,776 (2013) and the area is 53.76 km². Tijarafe is 7 km northwest of Los Llanos de Aridane and 19 km west of the island capital Santa Cruz de La Palma.

The eastern border of the municipality is formed by the crater rim of the Caldera de Taburiente and its outflow, the Barranco de las Angustias.

Tijarafe was the name of one of the twelve old areas where the Guanches used to settle before the Spanish conquest. It corresponded with the present municipalities Tijarafe and Puntagorda.

== Historical population ==
Year	Population
1991	2,195
1996	2,658
2001	2,730
2002	2,765
2003	2,687
2004	2,666
2008	2,757
2009	2,768
2013	2,776

== See also ==
- List of municipalities in Santa Cruz de Tenerife
