= Cachena =

Iberian breed of cattle

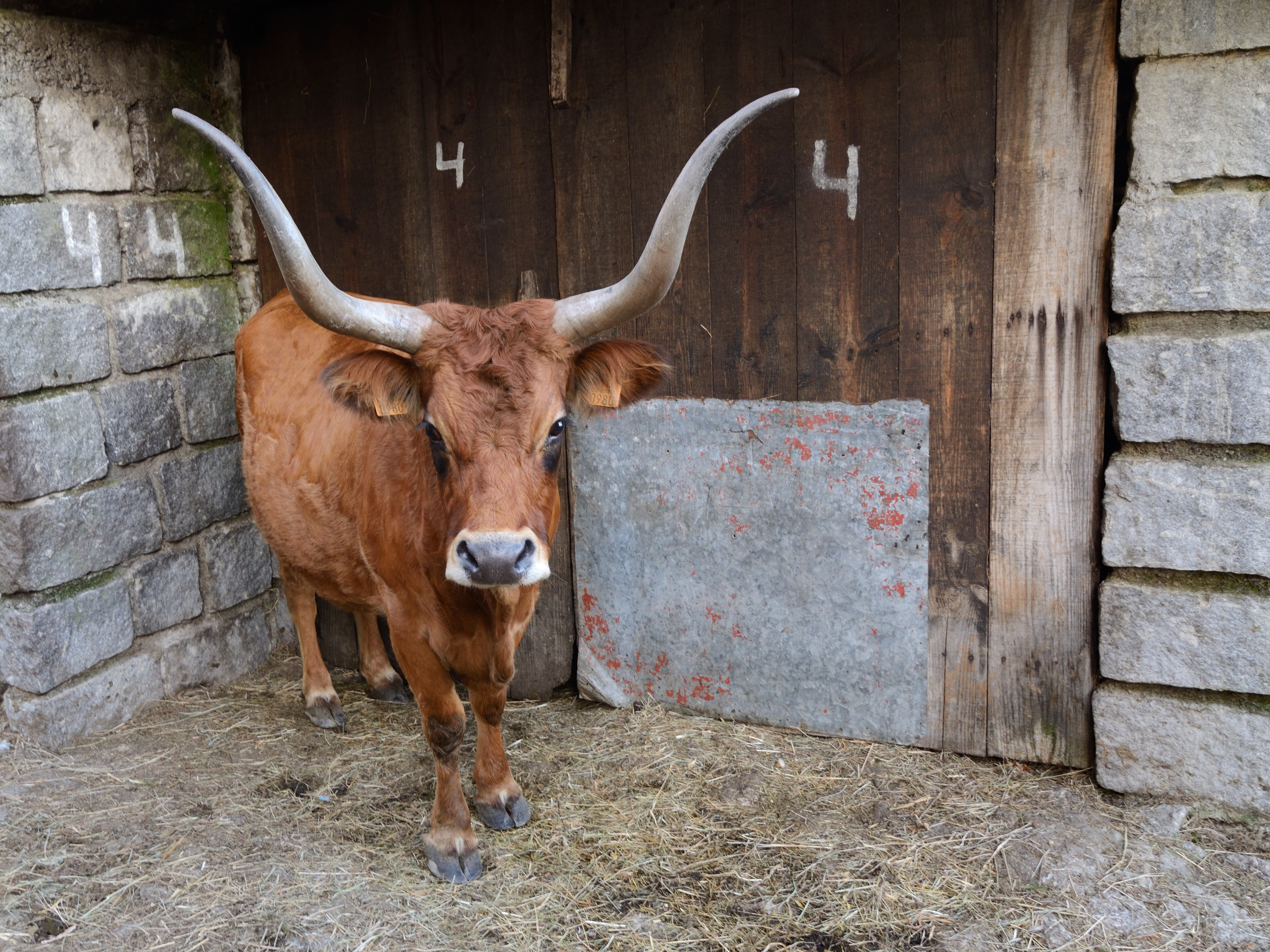
- Conservation status: FAO (2007): endangered; DAD-IS (2025): not at risk
- Country of origin: Portugal; Spain
- Distribution: northern Portugal; Galicia, Spain
- Use: formerly draught work, now beef

Traits
- Weight: Male: Portugal: average 550 kg; Spain: average 585 kg; Female: Portugal: average 350 kg; Spain: average 380 kg
- Height: Male: Portugal: average 115 cm; Spain: average 122 cm; Female: Portugal: average 105 cm; Spain: average 117 cm

The Cachena is an Iberian breed of small cattle, found both in northern Portugal and in the Spanish autonomous community of Galicia to the north. It was formerly kept principally for draught work; in the twenty-first century it is reared mostly for beef.

In Portugal, there is also the similar but larger cattle breed known by the name, Barrosão or Barrosã. Cachena and Barrosã are sometimes considered variants of the same race.

== History ==
Cachena cattle were bred from brown and yellow local cattle in Northern Portugal and Galicia (Spain). They are light brown to yellow with dark brown nuances around the withers. The mucosas are unpigmented, except of the dark muzzle. The wide and long horns are lyre-shaped.

Cachena cattle were originally bred in the Vila Real District, an agriculturally poor district in the extreme north of Portugal, and later were exported to Galicia (Spain). The climate is hot and dry in summer, cold and humid in winter. The grounds are arduous and little fertile. The Cachena cattle are distributed around the low mountain range regions of the communities in the Spanish natural park Baixa Limia-Serra do Xurés in the frontier region to Portugal. In addition, they are spread in the region around the Ourensic village Olelas and in the Portuguese Peneda-Gerês National Park.

== Characteristics ==
In Spain, average figures for bodyweight and height at the withers are 380 kg and 117 cm for cows, and 585 kg and 122 cm for bulls. The cattle in Portugal are considerably smaller, with average heights of 105 cm for cows and 115 cm for bulls, with bodyweights of 350 kg and 550 kg respectively.

== Use ==
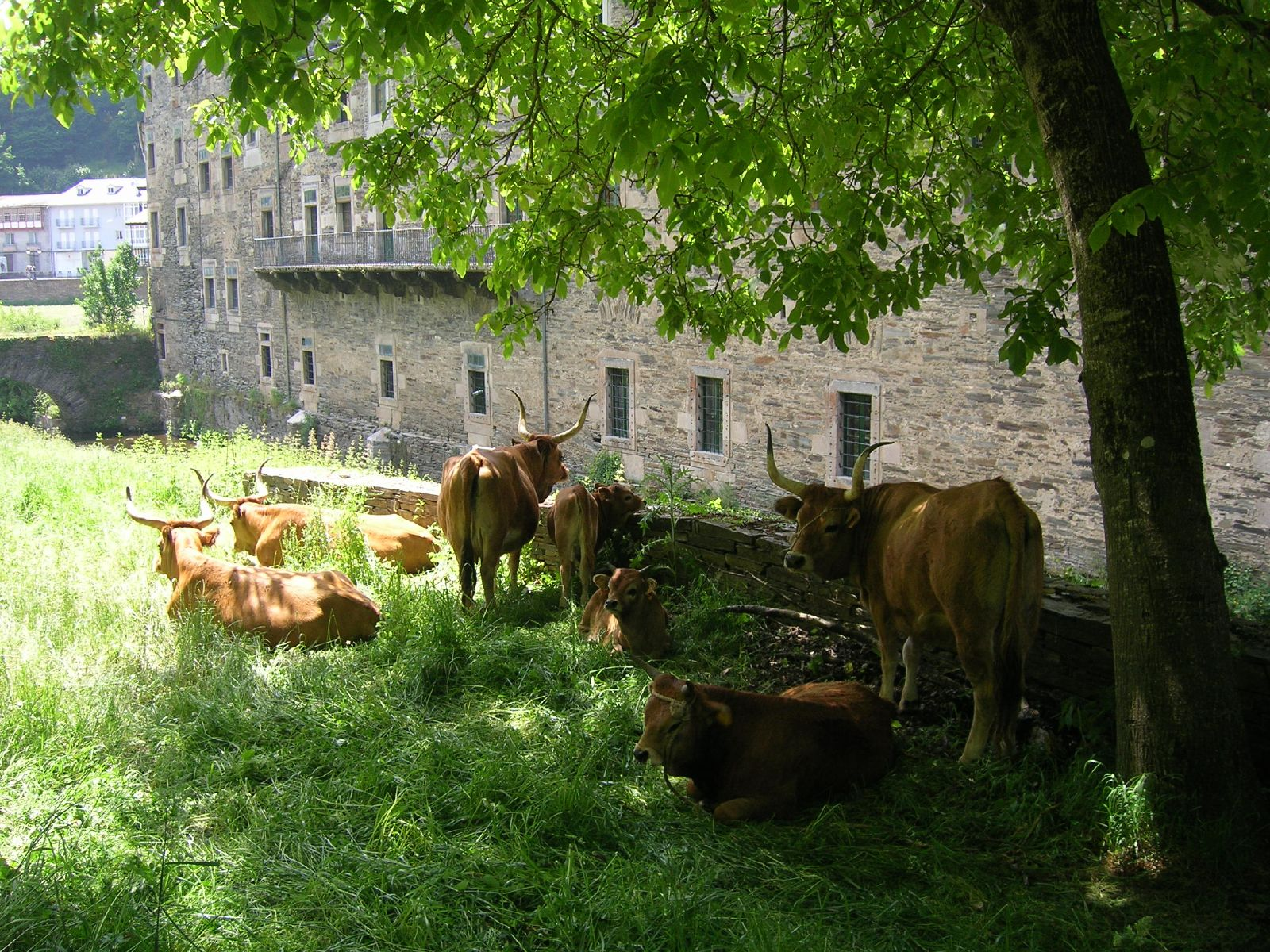
Cows near Samos Monastery

Nowadays they are only used for beef production. The beef is known for its excellent quality. The Cachena cow produces a little amount of milk that is of markedly good taste because of the wild herbs of the range, quasi-perfumed. It is refined to the cheese named "Brandas da Cachena". Some beef from the cattle may be marketed as "Carne Cachena da Peneda", which has Protected Designation of Origin status.

Cachena is a very rustic breed, excellently adapted to its environment. The Cachena cattle keep well when allowed to free range. Their good sense of smell helps them to search for rare herbs in the bushland. The cows are very good mothers and treat their calves exemplarily. Their small height may be an adaption to the hostile environment: a small cow needs less energy and survives famines.

== Protection ==
There were only 30 Cachena cattle extant in 1986. Five years later, there were 260 cattle. In Portugal, a plan for maintenance of domesticated animals in danger of extinction was made. By 2013, there were over 4700 cattle thriving in 165 herds. A Cachena cattle herdbook was founded in the year 2000.
